= Lists of shipwrecks =

This is an index of lists of shipwrecks, sorted by different criteria.

== By location ==
- List of shipwrecks of Africa
- List of shipwrecks of Asia
- List of shipwrecks of Europe
  - List of shipwrecks of France
  - List of shipwrecks of the United Kingdom
    - List of shipwrecks of England
- List of shipwrecks of North America
  - List of shipwrecks of Canada
  - List of shipwrecks of the United States
    - List of shipwrecks of California
    - List of shipwrecks of Florida
    - List of shipwrecks in the Great Lakes
      - List of shipwrecks in Lake Superior
    - List of shipwrecks of Massachusetts
    - List of shipwrecks of North Carolina
    - List of shipwrecks of Oregon
- List of shipwrecks of South America
- List of shipwrecks of Oceania
  - List of shipwrecks of Australia
  - List of shipwrecks of Southland
- List of shipwrecks in international waters
  - List of shipwrecks in the Atlantic Ocean
  - List of shipwrecks in the Pacific Ocean
  - List of shipwrecks in the Indian Ocean

== By date ==
=== Before 1914 ===
Before AD 1	AD 1 – 1000	1001–1100	1101–1200	1201–1300	1301–1400	1401–1500
1501–1600	1601–1699	1700–1709	1710–1719	1720–1729	1730–1739	1740–1746

							1747	1748	1749
1750	1751	1752	1753	1754	1755	1756	1757	1758	1759
1760	1761	1762	1763	1764	1765	1766	1767	1768	1769
1770	1771	1772	1773	1774	1775	1776	1777	1778	1779
1780	1781	1782	1783	1784	1785	1786	1787	1788	1789
1790	1791	1792	1793	1794	1795	1796	1797	1798	1799
1800	1801	1802	1803	1804	1805	1806	1807	1808	1809
1810	1811	1812	1813	1814	1815	1816	1817	1818	1819

1820	January	February	March	April	May	June	July	August	September	October	November	December
1821	January	February	March	April	May	June	July	August	September	October	November	December
1822	January	February	March	April	May	June	July	August	September	October	November	December
1823	January	February	March	April	May	June	July	August	September	October	November	December
1824	January	February	March	April	May	June	July	August	September	October	November	December
1825	January	February	March	April	May	June	July	August	September	October	November	December
1826	January	February	March	April	May	June	July	August	September	October	November	December
1827	January	February	March	April	May	June	July	August	September	October	November	December
1828	January	February	March	April	May	June	July	August	September	October	November	December
1829	January	February	March	April	May	June	July	August	September	October	November	December
1830	January	February	March	April	May	June	July	August	September	October	November	December
1831	January	February	March	April	May	June	July	August	September	October	November	December
1832	January	February	March	April	May	June	July	August	September	October	November	December
1833	January	February	March	April	May	June	July	August	September	October	November	December
1834	January	February	March	April	May	June	July	August	September	October	November	December
1835	January	February	March	April	May	June	July	August	September	October	November	December
1836	January	February	March	April	May	June	July	August	September	October	November	December
1837	January	February	March	April	May	June	July	August	September	October	November	December
1838	January	February	March	April	May	June	July	August	September	October	November	December
1839	January	February	March	April	May	June	July	August	September	October	November	December
1840	January	February	March	April	May	June	July	August	September	October	November	December
1841	January	February	March	April	May	June	July	August	September	October	November	December
1842	January	February	March	April	May	June	July	August	September	October	November	December
1843	January	February	March	April	May	June	July	August	September	October	November	December
1844	January	February	March	April	May	June	July	August	September	October	November	December
1845	January	February	March	April	May	June	July	August	September	October	November	December
1846	January	February	March	April	May	June	July	August	September	October	November	December
1847	January	February	March	April	May	June	July	August	September	October	November	December
1848	January	February	March	April	May	June	July	August	September	October	November	December
1849	January	February	March	April	May	June	July	August	September	October	November	December
1850	January	February	March	April	May	June	July	August	September	October	November	December
1851	January	February	March	April	May	June	July	August	September	October	November	December
1852	January	February	March	April	May	June	July	August	September	October	November	December
1853	January	February	March	April	May	June	July	August	September	October	November	December
1854	January	February	March	April	May	June	July	August	September	October	November	December
1855	January	February	March	April	May	June	July	August	September	October	November	December
1856	January	February	March	April	May	June	July	August	September	October	November	December
1857	January	February	March	April	May	June	July	August	September	October	November	December
1858	January	February	March	April	May	June	July	August	September	October	November	December
1859	January	February	March	April	May	June	July	August	September	October	November	December
1860	January	February	March	April	May	June	July	August	September	October	November	December
1861	January	February	March	April	May	June	July	August	September	October	November	December
1862	January	February	March	April	May	June	July	August	September	October	November	December
1863	January	February	March	April	May	June	July	August	September	October	November	December
1864	January	February	March	April	May	June	July	August	September	October	November	December
1865	January	February	March	April	May	June	July	August	September	October	November	December
1866	January	February	March	April	May	June	July	August	September	October	November	December
1867	January	February	March	April	May	June	July	August	September	October	November	December
1868	January	February	March	April	May	June	July	August	September	October	November	December
1869	January	February	March	April	May	June	July	August	September	October	November	December
1870	January	February	March	April	May	June	July	August	September	October	November	December
1871	January	February	March	April	May	June	July	August	September	October	November	December
1872	January	February	March	April	May	June	July	August	September	October	November	December
1873	January	February	March	April	May	June	July	August	September	October	November	December
1874	January	February	March	April	May	June	July	August	September	October	November	December
1875	January	February	March	April	May	June	July	August	September	October	November	December
1876	January	February	March	April	May	June	July	August	September	October	November	December
1877	January	February	March	April	May	June	July	August	September	October	November	December
1878	January	February	March	April	May	June	July	August	September	October	November	December
1879	January	February	March	April	May	June	July	August	September	October	November	December
1880	January	February	March	April	May	June	July	August	September	October	November	December
1881	January	February	March	April	May	June	July	August	September	October	November	December
1882	January	February	March	April	May	June	July	August	September	October	November	December
1883	January	February	March	April	May	June	July	August	September	October	November	December
1884	January	February	March	April	May	June	July	August	September	October	November	December
1885	January	February	March	April	May	June	July	August	September	October	November	December
1886	January	February	March	April	May	June	July	August	September	October	November	December
1887	January	February	March	April	May	June	July	August	September	October	November	December
1888	January	February	March	April	May	June	July	August	September	October	November	December
1889	January	February	March	April	May	June	July	August	September	October	November	December

1890	1891	1892	1893	1894	1895	1896	1897	1898	1899
1900	1901	1902	1903	1904	1905	1906	1907	1908	1909
1910	1911	1912	1913						

=== 1914 to 1938 ===
World War I was 1914–1918.

1914	January	February	March	April	May	June	July	August	September	October	November	December
1915	January	February	March	April	May	June	July	August	September	October	November	December
1916	January	February	March	April	May	June	July	August	September	October	November	December
1917	January	February	March	April	May	June	July	August	September	October	November	December
1918	January	February	March	April	May	June	July	August	September	October	November	December

									1919
1920	1921	1922	1923	1924	1925	1926	1927	1928	1929
1930	1931	1932	1933	1934	1935	1936	1937	1938	

=== 1939 to 1945 ===
World War II was 1939–1945.

1939	January	February	March	April	May	June	July	August	September	October	November	December
1940	January	February	March	April	May	June	July	August	September	October	November	December
1941	January	February	March	April	May	June	July	August	September	October	November	December
1942	January	February	March	April	May	June	July	August	September	October	November	December
1943	January	February	March	April	May	June	July	August	September	October	November	December
1944	January	February	March	April	May	June	July	August	September	October	November	December
1945	January	February	March	April	May	June	July	August	September	October	November	December

=== After 1945 ===
						1946	1947	1948	1949
1950	1951	1952	1953	1954	1955	1956	1957	1958	1959
1960	1961	1962	1963	1964	1965	1966	1967	1968	1969
1970	1971	1972	1973	1974	1975	1976	1977	1978	1979
1980	1981	1982	1983	1984	1985	1986	1987	1988	1989
1990	1991	1992	1993	1994	1995	1996	1997	1998	1999
2000	2001	2002	2003	2004	2005	2006	2007	2008	2009
2010	2011	2012	2013	2014	2015	2016	2017	2018	2019
2020	2021	2022	2023	2024	2025	2026			

== War and warships ==
=== By type of ship ===
- List of sunken aircraft carriers
- List of sunken battlecruisers
- List of sunken battleships
- List of sunken nuclear submarines

=== By war ===
- List of warships sunk during the Russo-Japanese War
- List of hospital ships sunk in World War I
- List of maritime disasters in World War I
- List of foreign ships wrecked or lost in the Spanish Civil War
- List of maritime disasters in World War II
- List of ships sunk by hostile action since World War II

=== By navy ===
- List of ships sunk by the Imperial Japanese Navy
- List of Allied ships lost to Italian surface vessels in the Mediterranean (1940–43)
- List of wrecked or lost ships of the Ottoman steam navy
- List of United States Navy losses in World War II

=== By method ===
- List of ships sunk by missiles

== See also ==
- Category: Lists of shipwrecks by year
- List of wreck diving sites
