= List of shipwrecks in the 12th century =

The list of shipwrecks in the 12th century includes some ships sunk, wrecked or otherwise lost between (and including) the years 1101 to 1200.

1120

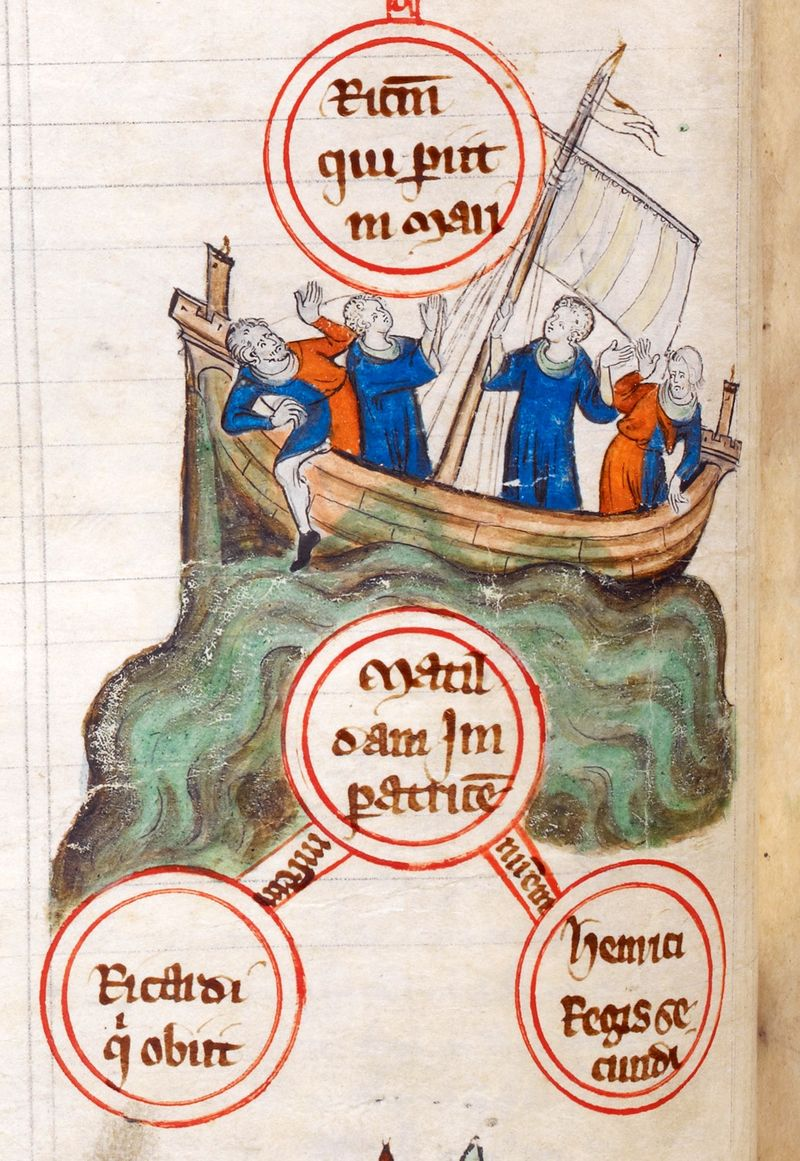
White Ship

- 25 November 1120 – White Ship or Blanche-Nef (England) sank off the Normandy coast just outside the harbour at Barfleur. The ship was carrying William Adelin, the son of Henry I of England, whose death caused a succession crisis and a period of civil war in England known as the Anarchy. There was one survivor of the 363 people on board.

1126

- Two unnamed ships (Uí Fiachrach): two coracles of the Ó Dubhda (O'Dowd) kingdom of north Connacht, Ireland sank; all crew members died, including the king, Domnall Find Ua Dubhda.

1191

- Two unnamed ships (England): Third Crusade: Two ships were wrecked on the coast of Cyprus. All on board were taken prisoner, leading to Richard the Lionheart to capture Cyprus.
