= List of shipwrecks in June 1820 =

The list of shipwrecks in June 1820 includes ships sunk, wrecked or otherwise lost during June 1820.

== 1 June ==
List of shipwrecks: 1 June 1820
Ship	State	Description
Henry	United Kingdom	The ship was run into by Lady Raffles ( British East India Company) in the River Thames and was severely damaged.
Vrow Catherina	Netherlands	The ship struck the pier at Ostend, West Flanders and was consequently beached. She was on a voyage from Liverpool, Lancashire, United Kingdom to Ostend.

== 2 June ==
List of shipwrecks: 2 June 1820
Ship	State	Description
Carolina	France	The ship foundered off Osmussaar, Russia. She was on a voyage from Saint Petersburg, Russia to Rouen, Seine-Inférieure.
Industry	(United Kingdom of Great Britain and Ireland) Bahamas	The ship was wrecked in the Bahamas. She was on a voyage from Nassau to Saint-Domingue.
Vrow Catherina	Netherlands	The ship struck the pier at Ostend, West Flanders and was beached. She was on a voyage from Liverpool, Lancashire, United Kingdom to Ostend.

== 4 June ==
List of shipwrecks: 4 June 1820
Ship	State	Description
Heros	(United Kingdom of Great Britain and Ireland) Saint Lucia	The drogher was lost at Saint Lucia.
Mary Ann	United Kingdom	The ship was wrecked on the Haisborough Sands, in the North Sea off the coast of Norfolk with the loss of all but one of her nine crew. The survivor was rescued by Irequois (United Kingdom).

== 6 June ==
List of shipwrecks: 6 June 1820
Ship	State	Description
Thalia	United Kingdom	The ship ran aground in the River Thames at Blackwall, Middlesex. She was on a voyage from London to Bombay, India.

== 7 June ==
List of shipwrecks: 7 June 1820
Ship	State	Description
Omnium	United Kingdom	The ship ran aground at Shoreham-by-Sea, Sussex. She was on a voyage from Memel, Prussia to Shoreham-by-Sea. She was refloated and taken in to Shoreham-by-Sea.

== 8 June ==
List of shipwrecks: 8 June 1820
Ship	State	Description
Esperance	France	The ship was run into by Anna Carolina (Norway at Ostend, Netherlands and sank.
London	United Kingdom	The ship was run down and sunk by Hope (United Kingdom) in the North Sea off Happisburgh, Norfolk. Her crew were rescued. London was on a voyage from London to Thorn

== 9 June ==
List of shipwrecks: 9 June 1820
Ship	State	Description
Enterprise	United Kingdom	The ship was wrecked on the French Keys. She was on a voyage from Jamaica to London.
John	United Kingdom	The sloop was wrecked off Brighton, Sussex.

== 14 June ==
List of shipwrecks: 14 June 1820
Ship	State	Description
John	United Kingdom	The ship was wrecked at "Gabbam". She was on a voyage from Saint Vincent to "Ristico", Prince Edward Island, British North America.

== 18 June ==
List of shipwrecks: 18 June 1820
Ship	State	Description
Patriot	United Kingdom	The ship struck a sunken wreck off Reculver, Kent and foundered. She was on a voyage from Swanage, Dorset to Maldon, Essex.

=== 22 June ===
List of shipwrecks: 22 June 1820
Ship	State	Description
Unnamed	United Kingdom	The East Indiaman ran aground on the Shivering Sand off the north Kent coast.

== 29 June ==
List of shipwrecks: 29 June 1820
Ship	State	Description
Brothers	United Kingdom	The whaler was lost in the Davis Straits. Her crew were rescued.

== Unknown date ==
List of shipwrecks: Unknown date in June 1820
Ship	State	Description
British Queen	United Kingdom	The ship foundered in Liverpool Bay.
Crown Prince	(United Kingdom of Great Britain and Ireland) Jamaica	The ship sank in the Rio de la Hacha, Colombia at the end of June. Her crew survived.
Emma	United Kingdom	The ship foundered off the Shetland Islands before 8 June.
Gustaff	Sweden	The ship was driven ashore and sank off Åland. She was on a voyage from Stockholm to Helsinki.
Hibernia	India	The brig was lost off Cape Remus with some loss of life.
Louise	France	The ship foundered in the Atlantic Ocean off Cape Ortegal, Spain before 23 June. Her crew were rescued. She was on a voyage from Havre de Grâce, Seine-Inférieure to Mauritius.
Mackerel	(United Kingdom of Great Britain and Ireland) Jamaica	The schooner was driven ashore and damaged in the Cayman Islands.
Mary	United Kingdom	The ship sprang a leak and foundered 10 nautical miles (19 km) off the Tuskar Rock on or before 15 June. Her crew survived. She was on a voyage from Glasgow, Renfrewshire to Gibraltar.
Mary	United Kingdom	The ship was wrecked at Cap Rozier, British North America.
Patrovinio	Portugal	The ship was wrecked 20 nautical miles (37 km) north of Bahía, United Kingdom of Portugal, Brazil and the Algarves. She was on a voyage from Oporto to Bahía.
