= List of shipwrecks in the 11th century =

The list of shipwrecks in the 11th century includes some ships sunk, wrecked or otherwise lost between (and including) the years 1001 to 1100.

1030

- Unnamed ship (Kingdom of Thomond): A ship of the Uí Briain (O'Brien) kingdom of western Ireland was sunk; three heirs of the Corcu Baiscind were drowned.

1084

- 10 October: Unnamed ship (Kingdom of Dublin): Gilla Pátraic (Patrick, Patricius), then Bishop of Dublin, is drowned along with his companions when their ship sinks in the Irish Sea.

1100

- A ship was wrecked on the Smalls Reef, off the Welsh coast.

Unknown date

- A ship was wrecked off Medan, Sumatra.
