= List of shipwrecks in April 1828 =

The list of shipwrecks in April 1828 includes all ships sunk, foundered, grounded, or otherwise lost during April 1828.

== 2 April ==
List of shipwrecks: 2 April 1828
Ship	State	Description
Margaret and Elizabeth	United Kingdom	The ship was destroyed by fire off the coast of County Antrim. Her crew were rescued by Town of Drogheda (United Kingdom). She was on a voyage from Liverpool, Lancashire, to Drogheda, County Louth.

== 3 April ==
List of shipwrecks: 3 April 1828
Ship	State	Description
British Oak	United Kingdom	The ketch was wrecked on The Skerries, in the Irish Sea off the coast of County Antrim. Her four crew were rescued. She was on a voyage from Liverpool, Lancashire, to Dublin.

== 4 April ==
List of shipwrecks: 4 April 1828
Ship	State	Description
Liberty	United Kingdom	The ship was abandoned off the coast of Iceland without loss of life.

== 5 April ==
List of shipwrecks: 5 April 1828
Ship	State	Description
Friendship	United Kingdom	The ship foundered in the North Sea off Nieupoort, West Flanders, Netherlands. She was on a voyage from Newcastle upon Tyne, Northumberland, to Dunkerque, Nord, France.

== 6 April ==
List of shipwrecks: 6 April 1828
Ship	State	Description
Roger and Barbara	United Kingdom	The ship was driven ashore and wrecked near Aberthaw, Glamorgan. She was on a voyage from Dublin to Bristol, Gloucestershire.

== 8 April ==
List of shipwrecks: 8 April 1828
Ship	State	Description
Paramaribo	Netherlands	The ship was wrecked on the Oster Bank.

== 15 April ==
List of shipwrecks: 15 April 1828
Ship	State	Description
Fides	United Kingdom	The ship was wrecked near Stornoway, Ayrshire. Her crew were rescued. She was on a voyage from Hull, Yorkshire, to Miramichi, New Brunswick, British North America.

== 16 April ==
List of shipwrecks: 16 April 1828
Ship	State	Description
HMS Acorn	Royal Navy	The sloop-of-war foundered. She was on a voyage from Bermuda to Halifax, Nova Scotia, British North America.
HMS Contest	Royal Navy	The brig foundered. She was on a voyage from Bermuda to Halifax.

== 18 April ==
List of shipwrecks: 18 April 1828
Ship	State	Description
Woodlark	United Kingdom	The brig was wrecked on a reef in the Torres Straits with the loss of six of the 24 people on board. She was on a voyage from Van Diemen's Land to the Cape of Good Hope.

== 20 April ==
List of shipwrecks: 20 April 1828
Ship	State	Description
Gertrude	United States	The ship was wrecked on the coast of New Jersey. She was on a voyage from Puerto Cabello, Gran Colombia, to New York City.

== 21 April ==
List of shipwrecks: 21 April 1828
Ship	State	Description
Catherine Maria	flag unknown	The ship was driven ashore at Dragør, Denmark. She was on a voyage from Libava, Courland Governorate to Amsterdam, North Holland, Netherlands.
Superb	United Kingdom	The schooner collided with an iceberg and sprang a leak. She was abandoned two days later and some of her crew were rescued by Catherine and Hannah (United Kingdom). Centurion took off others.

== 24 April ==
List of shipwrecks: 24 April 1828
Ship	State	Description
Betsey	United Kingdom	The ship was wrecked in Conception Bay.
Robert & Mary	United Kingdom	The ship was driven ashore and wrecked at Filey, Yorkshire.

== 26 April ==
List of shipwrecks: 26 April 1828
Ship	State	Description
Henry	United Kingdom	The ship was wrecked on the coast of Cuba. She was on a voyage from Barcelona, Spain, to Havana, Cuba.

== 27 April ==
List of shipwrecks: 27 April 1828
Ship	State	Description
Nancy	United Kingdom	The sloop was wrecked near Roanhead, Cumberland. Her crew survived. She was on a voyage from Whitehaven, Cumberland, to Ulverston, Lancashire.

== 29 April ==
List of shipwrecks: 29 April 1828
Ship	State	Description
Superb	United Kingdom	The ship was sunk by ice in Cape Cod Bay with the loss of all but five of her crew. She was on a voyage from Bristol, Gloucestershire, to Quebec, British North America.

== Unknown date ==
List of shipwrecks: Unknown date in April 1828
Ship	State	Description
Commerce	United Kingdom	The ship was lost on The Collins with the loss of all hands. She was on a voyage from Londonderry to London.
Fairfield	United Kingdom	The ship lost her rudder and was driven ashore in the Saltee Islands, County Donegal, where she was wrecked. She was on a voyage from St. John's, Newfoundland, British North America, to Liverpool, Lancashire.
Victory	United Kingdom	The ship was wrecked on a voyage from Plymouth, Devon, to Jersey, Channel Islands. All on board were rescued.
