= List of shipwrecks in April 1834 =

The list of shipwrecks in April 1834 includes ships sunk, foundered, wrecked, grounded or otherwise lost during April 1834.

== 1 April ==
List of shipwrecks: 1 April 1834
Ship	State	Description
Helens and Eleanora	United Kingdom	The ship was lost at Hook of Holland, South Holland, Netherlands. Her crew were rescued. She was on a voyage from Hull, Yorkshire to "Frazerburg".
Magdalene	Danzig	The ship was abandoned in the English Channel off the Isle of Wight. She was on a voyage from Danzig to Marseille, Bouches-du-Rhône France.
Talisman	United Kingdom	The sloop struck a rock off Girdleness, Aberdeenshire and was wrecked. Her crew were rescued. She was on a voyage from Aberdeen to Sunderland, County Durham.
Tartar	United Kingdom	The brig was driven ashore on Sand Island, Alabama, United States.

== 5 April ==
List of shipwrecks: 5 April 1834
Ship	State	Description
Cherub	United Kingdom	The brig was wrecked on Goose Island, British North America. All on board were rescued. She was on a voyage from the Clyde to Quebec City, Lower Canada, British North America.

== 6 April ==
List of shipwrecks: 6 April 1834
Ship	State	Description
Diana	Sweden	The ship was lost near Thisted, Denmark. She was on a voyage from Gothenburg to Antwerp, Belgium.
William Fawcett	United Kingdom	The steamship was destroyed by fire at Dublin.

== 8 April ==
List of shipwrecks: 8 April 1834
Ship	State	Description
Lord Gambier	United Kingdom	The brig was wrecked in Engleholm Bay, Sweden. Her crew were rescued, but three of the nine rescuers drowned. She was on a voyage from Sunderland, County Durham to Riga, Russia.
Rosetta	United Kingdom	The ship was driven ashore at Shoreham-by-Sea, Sussex. She was on a voyage from Sunderland to Shoreham-by-Sea.

== 9 April ==
List of shipwrecks: 9 April 1834
Ship	State	Description
Minerva	United Kingdom	The ship was driven ashore and wrecked at Rockaway, Long Island, New York, United States. All on board were rescued. She was on a voyage from Plymouth, Devon to New York City.
Princeza da Beira	Portugal	The ship was destroyed by fire at Lisbon.

== 10 April ==
List of shipwrecks: 10 April 1834
Ship	State	Description
Mary Anne	(United Kingdom of Great Britain and Ireland) British North America	The schooner was abandoned in the Atlantic Ocean 140 nautical miles (260 km) off Newfoundland after colliding with another vessel. Her crew were rescued.
Shenandoah	United States	The ship was wrecked at the mouth of the Weser. One hundred and sixty-one passengers and crew were rescued. She was on a voyage from Bremen to Baltimore, Maryland.

== 11 April ==
List of shipwrecks: 11 April 1834
Ship	State	Description
Caledonia	United Kingdom	The ship was wrecked at Rockaway, Long Island, New York, United States. All on board were rescued. She was on a voyage from Liverpool, Lancashire to New York City.

== 16 April ==
List of shipwrecks: 16 April 1834
Ship	State	Description
Anna Maria	Austrian Empire	The ship was wrecked on the Dry Tortugas. Her crew were rescued. She was on a voyage from Trieste to La Guaira, Venezuela.

== 18 April ==
List of shipwrecks: 18 April 1834
Ship	State	Description
Prince Regent	(United Kingdom of Great Britain and Ireland) New South Wales	The schooner was wrecked in the Bass Strait. All on board survived. She was on a voyage from Hobart to Launceston, Van Diemen's Land.

== 24 April ==
List of shipwrecks: 24 April 1834
Ship	State	Description
Caledonia	(United Kingdom of Great Britain and Ireland) British North America	The ship was abandoned in the Atlantic Ocean (40°N 50°W). Her crew were rescued.
Carrington	United Kingdom	The ship was sighted in the Atlantic Ocean (34°N 45°W) by Margaret (United Kingdom). No further trace, presumed to have subsequently foundered with the loss of all hands. She was on a voyage from Saint Vincent to London.
James	United Kingdom	The full-rigged ship was abandoned in the Grand Banks of Newfoundland with the loss of 254 of the 265 people on board. Survivors were rescued by Margaret (United Kingdom). James was on a voyage from Limerick to Quebec City, Lower Canada, British North America.

== 25 April ==
List of shipwrecks: 25 April 1834
Ship	State	Description
Robert William Harris	United Kingdom	The brig struck ice in the Atlantic Ocean (43°N 50°W) and sank. Her crew took to the boat and were rescued a few days later by Economy (United Kingdom). She was on a voyage from Liverpool, Lancashire to Newfoundland, British North America.

== 26 April ==
List of shipwrecks: 26 April 1834
Ship	State	Description
Ouse	United Kingdom	The ship was driven ashore on the south coast of Gotland, Sweden. She was refloated on 3 May and taken in to a port on the island for repairs. Ouse was on a voyage from King's Lynn, Norfolk to Saint Petersburg, Russia.
Redpole	(United Kingdom of Great Britain and Ireland) New South Wales	The coaster was wrecked at Newcastle with the loss of all handss.

== 27 April ==
List of shipwrecks: 27 April 1834
Ship	State	Description
Fanny	United Kingdom	The ship was wrecked on the coast of Newfoundland, British North America. Her crew were rescued.
Trafalgar	(United Kingdom of Great Britain and Ireland) British North America	The ship was sunk by ice in the Gut of Canso. Her crew were rescued. She was on a voyage from Saint John, New Brunswick to Quebec City, Lower Canada.
Water Witch	United Kingdom	The steamship sprang a leak in the North Sea 4 nautical miles (7.4 km) off Ryhope, County Durham. She was taken in tow by the South Shields pilot boat and beached at Hendon, where she subsequently became a wreck.

== 28 April ==
List of shipwrecks: 28 April 1834
Ship	State	Description
Glenlyon	United Kingdom	The ship was wrecked on the coast of the Isle of Man. She was on a voyage from Campbeltown, Argyllshire to Liverpool, Lancashire.
William Lees	United Kingdom	The brig was driven ashore at Seaham, County Durham.

== 29 April ==
List of shipwrecks: 29 April 1834
Ship	State	Description
Harriet	(United Kingdom of Great Britain and Ireland) New South Wales	The whaler, a barque, was wrecked on Cape Egmont, New Zealand. All 31 on board survived, but eleven were subsequently killed in skirmishes with the natives.

== 30 April ==
List of shipwrecks: 30 April 1834
Ship	State	Description
Scarborough Castle	United Kingdom	The sbrig was abandoned in the Atlantic Ocean. Her crew were rescued by Retreat (United Kingdom). Scarborough Castle was on a voyage from Hull to Quebec City, Lower Canada, British North America.

== Unknown date ==
List of shipwrecks: Unknown date 1834
Ship	State	Description
Adelaide	(United Kingdom of Great Britain and Ireland) New South Wales	The cutter was wrecked off Bird Island.
Alexandre	France	The ship was wrecked near Ténedos, Ottoman Empire. She was on a voyage from Marseille, Bouches-du-Rhône to Constantinople, Ottoman Empire.
Amelia	Spain	The ship was wrecked on São Miguel, Azores, Portugal before 20 April. Her crew were rescued. She was on a voyage from Puerto Rico to Cádiz.
Henrietta		Bremen: The ship was lost off Texel, North Holland, Netherlands with the loss of her captain. She was on a voyage from Liverpool, Lancashire, United Kingdom to Bremen.
Jeune Emelle	France	The ship was wrecked near Varna, Ottoman Empire. She was on a voyage from Constantinople to Odesa.
Linnet	(United Kingdom of Great Britain and Ireland) New South Wales	The cutter was wrecked in Broken Bay.
Rodney	United States	The brig sprang a leak and was abandoned in the Atlantic Ocean 60 nautical miles (110 km) off Cape Clear Island, County Cork, United Kingdom after 6 April. Her crew were rescued by the brig Douglas (United Kingdom). Rodney was on a voyage from Mobile, Alabama, to Liverpool.
Trimmer	United Kingdom	The ship was lost on the "Roquis" before 5 April. She was on a voyage from Saint Thomas, Virgin Islands to La Guaira, Venezuela.
Wanderer	United Kingdom	The ship was driven ashore and wrecked at "Carabowbow", near the entrance to the Bosphorus, before 12 April. Her crew were rescued. She was on a voyage from Odesa to Liverpool.
