= List of shipwrecks in August 1832 =

The list of shipwrecks in August 1832 includes ships sunk, foundered, grounded, or otherwise lost during August 1832.

== 2 August ==
List of shipwrecks: 2 August 1832
| Ship | State | Description |
|---|---|---|
| Centinelle | Portugal | The ship was driven ashore in a hurricane at Macao. |
| Cornwallis | United Kingdom | The ship was driven ashore in a hurricane at Canton, China. |
| Java | United States | The ship foundered in a hurricane off "Capshing Moon", China with the loss of eleven of the 55 people om board. Survivors were rescued by Spartan (United Kingdom). Java was on a voyage from "Capshing Moon" to Macao. |
| Gabrielle | Mexico | The brig was driven ashore in a hurricane at Canton. |
| Liffey | United Kingdom | The dispatch boat was lost in a hurricane at Lintin Island, China. |
| Petrel | United Kingdom | The dispatch boat was lost in a hurricane at Lintin Island. |

== 3 August ==
List of shipwrecks: 3 August 1832
| Ship | State | Description |
|---|---|---|
| Yarmouth | United Kingdom | The ship was wrecked on Grand Cayman. Her crew were rescued. She was on a voyage from Jamaica to New York, United States. |

== 4 August ==
List of shipwrecks: 4 August 1832
| Ship | State | Description |
|---|---|---|
| Delaford | United Kingdom | The ship was driven ashore and wrecked at Dundrum, Dublin. She was on a voyage from Liverpool, Lancashire to Quebec City, Lower Canada, British North America. |

== 8 August ==
List of shipwrecks: 8 August 1832
| Ship | State | Description |
|---|---|---|
| Alcyope | United Kingdom | The ship was wrecked off Dublin. Her crew were rescued. She was on a voyage from Dublin to Miramichi, New Brunswick, British North America. |

== 10 August ==
List of shipwrecks: 10 August 1832
| Ship | State | Description |
|---|---|---|
| Peggy | United Kingdom | The sloop foundered in the North Sea off Arbroath, Forfarshire. All on board were rescued. |
| Saint Patrick | United Kingdom | The smack capsized and sank off the Isle of Arran with the loss of all three crew. She was on a voyage from Ayr to Portrush, County Antrim. |

== 11 August ==
List of shipwrecks: 11 August 1832
| Ship | State | Description |
|---|---|---|
| Leonidas | United Kingdom | The transport ship was wrecked on Cape Breton Island, Nova Scotia, British North America. All on board were rescued. She was on a voyage from Halifax, Nova Scotia to Quebec City, Lower Canada. |

== 12 August ==
List of shipwrecks: 12 August 1832
| Ship | State | Description |
|---|---|---|
| Erato | United Kingdom | The ship was wrecked north of Cape St. Vincent, Portugal. Her crew were rescued. She was on a voyage from London to Livorno, Grand Duchy of Tuscany. |
| George and Thomas | United Kingdom | The ship was wrecked on Langley Island, Massachusetts, United States. She was on a voyage from Barbados, to Quebec City, Lower Canada, British North America. |

== 13 August ==
List of shipwrecks: 13 August 1832
| Ship | State | Description |
|---|---|---|
| Havanna | (United Kingdom of Great Britain and Ireland) British North America | The brig was destroyed by fire in the Atlantic Ocean (26°18′N 72°30′W). Her crew survived. She was on a voyage from Montego Bay, Jamaica to Quebec City, Lower Canada. |

== 14 August ==
List of shipwrecks: 14 August 1832
| Ship | State | Description |
|---|---|---|
| Elizabeth | United Kingdom | The ship was in collision with another vessel and foundered. Her crew were rescued. She was on a voyage from Montreal, Lower Canada, British North America to Halifax, Nova Scotia, British North America. |

== 15 August ==
List of shipwrecks: 15 August 1832
| Ship | State | Description |
|---|---|---|
| Cygnet | United Kingdom | The ship was driven ashore and wrecked at Whitehaven, Cumberland. |
| Hopewell | United Kingdom | The ship was wrecked on the Hansley Rocks, on the coast of Northumberland. |

== 16 August ==
List of shipwrecks: 16 August 1832
| Ship | State | Description |
|---|---|---|
| Agnes | United Kingdom | The ship was lost in Cockburn Sound. Her crew were rescued. She was on a voyage from London to the Swan River Colony. |

== 22 August ==
List of shipwrecks: 22 August 1832
| Ship | State | Description |
|---|---|---|
| Flora | United Kingdom | The ship was driven ashore on the south west coast of Anticosti Island, Lower Canada, British North America and wrecked. All on board were rescued. She was on a voyage from Quebec City, Lower Canada to Padstow, Cornwall. |

== 27 August ==
List of shipwrecks: 27 August 1832
| Ship | State | Description |
|---|---|---|
| Johanna | Stettin | The ship departed from Newcastle upon Tyne, Northumberland, United Kingdom for Stettin. No further trace, presumed foundered with the loss of all hands. |
| Vane | United Kingdom | The collier, a brig, was wrecked on the Corton Sand, in the North Sea off the coast of Suffolk. Her crew were rescued. She was on a voyage from Sunderland, County Durham to London. |

== 28 August ==
List of shipwrecks: 28 August 1832
| Ship | State | Description |
|---|---|---|
| Caledonia | United Kingdom | The ship sprang a leak and was abandoned by her crew. She was on a voyage from Bremen to Gaspé. |
| Dispatch | United Kingdom | The ship was wrecked at Newhaven, Sussex. Her crew were rescued. She was on a voyage from London to Bridport, Dorset. |
| Providence | United Kingdom | The ship ran aground on the Platter Rocks, in the Irish Sea off the coast of Anglesey and sank. Her crew were rescued. |

== 29 August ==
List of shipwrecks: 29 August 1832
| Ship | State | Description |
|---|---|---|
| Confidence | United Kingdom | The ship was wrecked near St. Ives, Cornwall with the loss of her captain. She was on a voyage from Liverpool, Lancashire to Charlestown, Cornwall. |
| Osiris | United Kingdom | The ship foundered in the English Channel off Dover, Kent. Her crew were rescued. She was on a voyage from Ostend, West Flanders, Belgium to Liverpool, Lancashire. |
| Ugie | United Kingdom | The ship was driven ashore at Ramsgate, Kent. She was on a voyage from Memel, Prussia to Swansea, Glamorgan. |
| Vane | United Kingdom | The ship was driven on to the Cherton Sand, in the North Sea and sank. Her crew were rescued. She was on a voyage from Sunderland, County Durham to London. |

== Unknown date ==
List of shipwrecks: Unknown date in August 1832
| Ship | State | Description |
|---|---|---|
| Little Primrose | United Kingdom | The ship was abandoned off Hamburg. She was on a voyage from Stettin, Prussia to London. |
| Susan | (United Kingdom of Great Britain and Ireland) British North America | The ship was driven ashore on Wreck Reef, off the coast of Jamaica between 28 and 31 August during a hurricane. |
