= List of shipwrecks in August 1827 =

The list of shipwrecks in August 1827 includes some ships sunk, wrecked or otherwise lost during August 1827.

== 4 August ==
List of shipwrecks: 4 August 1827
Ship	State	Description
Hoppet	France	The ship was wrecked on the Sarcelle/ She was on a voyage from Nantes, Loire-Inférieure to St. Ubes, Spain.

== 5 August ==
List of shipwrecks: 5 August 1827
Ship	State	Description
Dispatch	United Kingdom	The ship was wrecked on the coast of Jutland, Denmark. She was on a voyage from Neustadt in Holstein, Duchy of Schleswig to London.

== 7 August ==
List of shipwrecks: 7 August 1827
Ship	State	Description
Caravan	United Kingdom	The ship ran aground and was wrecked at Prapatingas, Empire of Brazil. Her crew were rescued.
Enigheten	Sweden	The ship was driven ashore and wrecked at Thisted, Denmark. Her crew were rescued. She was on a voyage from Gothenburg to a Dutch port.

== 8 August ==
List of shipwrecks: 8 August 1827
Ship	State	Description
Thaddeus	United Kingdom	The ship foundered in Croyde Bay. Her crew survived.

== 12 August ==
List of shipwrecks: 12 August 1827
Ship	State	Description
Harriet	United Kingdom	The ship departed from Aux Cayes, Haiti for Cowes, Isle of Wight. No further trace, presumed foundered with the loss of all hands.

== 15 August ==
List of shipwrecks: 15 August 1827
Ship	State	Description
Peter and Maria	Netherlands	The ship foundered in the Baltic Sea. She was on a voyage from Riga, Russia to the Maas.

== 17 August ==
List of shipwrecks: 17 August 1827
Ship	State	Description
Constantia	Denmark	The ship was driven ashore in a hurricane at St. Croix, Virgin Islands. She was later refloated.
Emelie	Denmark	The ship was driven ashore in a hurricane at St. Croix. She was later refloated.
Indian	United Kingdom	The ship was abandoned in the Atlantic Ocean off the coast of Nova Scotia, British North America.
Phœnix	Denmark	The ship was driven ashore and wrecked in a hurricane at St. Croix.
Sir James Kempt	(United Kingdom of Great Britain and Ireland) Grenada	The ship was driven ashore and wrecked in a hurricane at St. Croix. All on board were rescued. She was on a voyage from Trinidad to Antigua.
St. Bartholomew's	United Kingdom	The ship was driven ashore in a hurricane at St. Croix.
St. Croix	Flensburg	The ship was driven ashore in a hurricane at St. Croix. She was refloated the next day.

== 18 August ==
List of shipwrecks: 18 August 1827
Ship	State	Description
Alonzo	United Kingdom	The barque was driven ashore and wrecked in a hurricane at Santo Domingo, Dominican Republic with the loss of nine of her crew.
Julia	United Kingdom	The brig was driven ashore in a hurricane at Santo Domingo. There was one survivor.
Nikolay (Николай)	Imperial Russian Navy	The schooner ran aground at Okhotsk. She was wrecked by 21 August.
Samuel	United Kingdom	The brig was driven ashore in a hurricane at Santo Domingo with some loss of life.
St. Domingo	United Kingdom	The brig was driven ashore in a hurricane at Santo Domingo with the loss of a crew member.

== 19 August ==
List of shipwrecks: 19 August 1827
Ship	State	Description
Parker	United States	The brig was driven ashore and wrecked at Veracruz, Mexico.

== 20 August ==
List of shipwrecks: 20 August 1827
Ship	State	Description
Herald	United States	The brig was driven ashore and wrecked at Veracruz, Mexico. She was on a voyage from Marseille, Bouches-du-Rhône, France to Veracruz.
Joven Martha	Spain	The brig was driven ashore and wrecked at Veracruz.

== 21 August ==
List of shipwrecks: 21 August 1827
Ship	State	Description
Parker	United Kingdom	The ship was driven ashore at Veracruz, Mexico.

== 22 August ==
List of shipwrecks: 22 August 1827
Ship	State	Description
Cleopatra	United Kingdom	The ship was dismasted and subsequently capsized in the Atlantic Ocean Her crew were rescued. She was on a voyage from Barbados to Windsor, Nova Scotia, British North America.

== 23 August ==
List of shipwrecks: 23 August 1827
Ship	State	Description
Sovereign	United Kingdom	The ship was wrecked on the Rum Key. She was on a voyage from Jamaica to Saint John, New Brunswick, British North America.

== 24 August ==
List of shipwrecks: 24 August 1827
Ship	State	Description
Clarissa	United States	The ship was wrecked at Tolbøl near Thisted, Denmark. She was on a voyage from Providence, Rhode Island to Gothenburg, Sweden and Copenhagen, Denmark.
Hero	United Kingdom	The ship was driven ashore at Memel, Prussia. She was on a voyage from Sunderland, County Durham to Memel. Hero was refloated on 27 August and taken in to Memel.

== 25 August ==
List of shipwrecks: 25 August 1827
Ship	State	Description
Crawford	United Kingdom	The brig foundered in the Atlantic Ocean off Cape Finisterre, Spain. All on board were rescued by Mansfield (United Kingdom. She was on a voyage from London to Barcelona, Spain via Málaga and Valencia.
Familien	Sweden	The ship was run down and sunk off The Neddings. She was on a voyage from Stockholm to Gothenburg.

== 26 August ==
List of shipwrecks: 26 August 1827
Ship	State	Description
Deborah and Maria	Netherlands	The ship was run down and sunk off Anholt, Denmark. Her crew were rescued. She was on a voyage from Königsberg, Prussia to Amsterdam, North Holland.
Lady Burnaby	(United Kingdom of Great Britain and Ireland) Bermuda	The ship was wrecked on the Square Handkerchief Reef. She was on a voyage from the Turks Islands to Bermuda.

== 27 August ==
List of shipwrecks: 27 August 1827
Ship	State	Description
Glasgow	United Kingdom	The brig struck the Loather Rock in the Pentland Firth and foundered. Her crew were rescued.
William	United Kingdom	The ship was severely damaged by fire at Bridlington, Yorkshire. Temporary repairs were nade and she departed for Aberdeen on 15 October.

== 28 August ==
List of shipwrecks: 28 August 1827
Ship	State	Description
Fortitude Increased	United Kingdom	The ship was wrecked on the north coast of Skagen, Denmark. Her crew were rescued. She was on a voyage from St. Petersburg, Russia to London.
Henry Johnson	United States	The ship capsized in a hurricane with the loss of all but two of her crew. She was on a voyage from Saint-Barthélemy to Bridgeport, Connecticut.

== 29 August ==
List of shipwrecks: 29 August 1827
Ship	State	Description
Margaret	United Kingdom	The ship was lost between the Isle of Arran and Limerick.
William	United Kingdom	The ship was wrecked at Dunnet Head, Caithness. She was on a voyage from Liverpool, Lancashire to Peterhead, Aberdeenshire.

== 30 August ==
List of shipwrecks: 30 August 1827
Ship	State	Description
St. Antonius	United Kingdom	The ship ran aground on Stromness Point, Orkney Islands and was wrecked. Her crew were rescued.

== Unknown date ==
List of shipwrecks: Unknown date in August 1827
Ship	State	Description
Jane	United Kingdom	The ship foundered in the Mediterranean Sea west of Sicily before 31 August. She was on a voyage from Cardiff, Glamorgan to Naples, Kingdom of the Two Sicilies.
Thorns	United Kingdom	The ship was lost in Weld Cove, Scatarie Island, Nova Scotia, British North America. Her crew were rescued. She was on a voyage from Lisbon, Portugal to Newfoundland, British North America.
