= List of shipwrecks in March 1829 =

The list of shipwrecks in March 1829 includes some ships sunk, wrecked or otherwise lost during March 1829.

== 1 March ==
List of shipwrecks: 1 March 1829
Ship	State	Description
Chardavoine	Denmark	The ship was wrecked on Saona Island, Dominican Republic. Her crew were rescued by Durance (France).
Salacia	United Kingdom	The ship was wrecked on the Haisborough Sands with the loss of two of her seven crew.

== 3 March ==
List of shipwrecks: 3 March 1829
Ship	State	Description
Nantais	France	The ship was wrecked at the mouth of the Mississippi River. Her crew were rescued.

== 5 March ==
List of shipwrecks: 5 March 1829
Ship	State	Description
Persia	United States	The ship was lost near Cape Ann, Massachusetts. She was on a voyage from Palermo, Sicily to Salem, Massachusetts.

== 6 March ==
List of shipwrecks: 6 March 1829
Ship	State	Description
Crescent	United Kingdom	The ship was wrecked at Jersey, Channel Islands. She was on a voyage from London to Jersey.
Hope	United Kingdom	The ship was run down and sunk in the Irish Sea by Ariel (United Kingdom). Her crew were rescued. She was on a voyage from Maryport, Cumberland to Belfast, County Antrim.
Spring	United Kingdom	The ship was driven ashore and wrecked at Rattray Head, Aberdeenshire.

== 7 March ==
List of shipwrecks: 7 March 1829
Ship	State	Description
Corsair	United Kingdom	The ship struck the Whitby Rock and capsized with the loss of five lives. She was on a voyage from Aberdeen to London.
Fergus	United Kingdom	The ship was wrecked on the Haisborough Sands, in the North Sea off the coast of Norfolk.

== 10 March ==
List of shipwrecks: 10 March 1829
Ship	State	Description
William & Ann	United Kingdom	The brig was wrecked at the mouth of the Columbia River. All 26 people on board were murdered by natives. She was on a voyage from London to Fort Vancouver, Washington, United States.

== 14 March ==
List of shipwrecks: 14 March 1829
Ship	State	Description
Lord Melville	United Kingdom	The smack was in collision with Lord Nelson (United Kingdom) in the North Sea off the Farne Islands, Northumberland and sank with the loss of four lives.
Thomas	(United Kingdom of Great Britain and Ireland) British Cape Colony	The brig departed from Port Elizabeth. No further trace, presumed foundered with the loss of all hands.
Young John	United Kingdom	The ship struck a rock and foundered in the Firth of Forth. She was on a voyage from Wemyss, Fife to Aberdeen.

== 17 March ==
List of shipwrecks: 17 March 1829
Ship	State	Description
Louisa	United Kingdom	The ship was wrecked off Arbroath, Forfarshire. Her crew were rescued. She was on a voyage from South Shields, County Durham to Dundee, Forfarshire.

== 19 March ==
List of shipwrecks: 19 March 1829
Ship	State	Description
Jupiter	United Kingdom	The ship was wrecked at Sidmouth, Devon. She was on a voyage from South Shields, County Durham to Sidmouth.

== 22 March ==
List of shipwrecks: 22 March 1829
Ship	State	Description
Frau Cecelia	Hamburg	The ship was driven ashore at Cuxhaven, Kingdom of Hanover and wrecked. She was on a voyage from Altona to Hull, Yorkshire, United Kingdom.

== 23 March ==
List of shipwrecks: 23 March 1829
Ship	State	Description
Rocket	United Kingdom	The ship was wrecked at Torbay, Nova Scotia, British North America. She was on a voyage from Jamaica to the Saint Lawrence River.

== 24 March ==
List of shipwrecks: 24 March 1829
Ship	State	Description
Thomas	(United Kingdom of Great Britain and Ireland) Cape Colony	The brig departed from Port Elizabeth for Table Bay. No further trace, presumed foundered with the loss of all hands.

== 26 March ==
List of shipwrecks: 26 March 1829
Ship	State	Description
Ann	United Kingdom	The ship ran aground on the Haisborough Sands, in the North Sea off the coast of Norfolk and sank. Her crew were rescued.

== 31 March ==
List of shipwrecks: 31 March 1829
Ship	State	Description
Columbine	United Kingdom	The ship was wrecked in St. Helen's Bay, Cape of Good Hope. All on board were rescued. She was on a voyage from London to New South Wales.

== Unknown date ==
List of shipwrecks: Unknown date 1829
Ship	State	Description
Aurora	United Kingdom	The schooner was lost on "Chalonge Point". She was on a voyage from Bermuda to Windsor, Nova Scotia, British North America.
Doloresy	Spain	The ship was wrecked at San Lucar. Her crew were rescued. She was on a voyage from London, United Kingdom to San Lucar.
