= List of shipwrecks in 1874 =

The list of shipwrecks in 1874 includes ships sunk, foundered, grounded, or otherwise lost during 1874.

table of contents
1874
Jan	Feb	Mar	Apr
May	Jun	Jul	Aug
Sep	Oct	Nov	Dec
Unknown date

== Unknown date ==
List of shipwrecks: Unknown date 1874
Ship	State	Description
Aneroid	United Kingdom	The ship was driven ashore in the Schuylkill River after 23 February.
Capiolani	United Kingdom	The ship was wrecked at "Seno" in the Pacific Ocean. She was on a voyage from Brisbane, Queensland to San Francisco, California, United States.
Clotilde	United Kingdom	The ship caught fire and was abandoned at sea. Her crew were rescued. She was on a voyage from Cardiff, Glamorgan to Valparaíso, Chile.
Delfina	United Kingdom	The steamship struck a rock off the west coast of South America and was wrecked with loss of life. There were six survivors.
Dornkat	Russia	The ship sank in the Baltic Sea. She was raised by means of air bags.
Durham	United Kingdom	The ship was wrecked on the Vaivaata Reef, in the Society Islands.
Eliza Mory	New South Wales	The brig was wrecked in the Waitara River, New Zealand. She was on a voyage from Newcastle to the Waitara River.
Ella Morris	New South Wales	The ship was wrecked at Nouméa, New Caledonia. She was on a voyage from Sydney to New Caledonia.
François	France	The fishing vessel was wrecked on the coast of Iceland. Her crew survived.
George S. Wright	United Kingdom	The steamship was wrecked on the coast of South Australia. Her crew survived, but most of them were murdered by Kimgat Indians. Four survivors were rescued in 1877 by HMS Rocket (Royal Navy).
Hélène Burchard	United Kingdom	The steamship ran aground off Saaremaa, Russian Empire after 27 November. She was refloated and put back to Riga, Russia, where she arrived on 14 December.
Henri Joseph	France	The ship foundered in the Gulf of Mexico. Wreckage washed up at Tampico, Mexico on 27 July.
Jacna	Chile	The ship foundered off Pichidangui.
Medora	United Kingdom	The brig ran aground off Gibraltar. She was refloated on 6 April 1875 and taken in to Gibraltar, having been aground for "some months".
Monte Video	Uruguay	The steamship was lost whilst on a voyage from the River Plate to Rangoon, Burma. Her crew were rescued by Constance (Sweden).
Phemerin	France	The fishing vessel was wrecked on the coast of Iceland. Her crew survived.
Queen of the Colonies	United Kingdom	The extreme clipper was wrecked whilst on a voyage from Java, Netherlands East Indies to Falmouth, Cornwall.
HMS Renard	Royal Navy	The Beagle-class schooner ran aground on a reef in the Pacific Ocean.
Shasta	United Kingdom	The brig ran aground on the Salvore Shoal after 6 October. She was on a voyage from City Point , United States to Trieste.
HMS Thetis	Royal Navy	The Briton-class corvette was driven ashore East Indies. It was reported that she would be repaired at Bombay, India or Trincomalee, Ceylon.
Twins	South Australia	The schooner was wrecked on a reef off Timor, Netherlands East Indies.

Le Nil, French Ship, March 20, 1874, sank off the Izu Peninsula of Japan with 192 boxes of art returning from the 1873 Vienna World's Fair. Some items of art were later recovered.
