= List of shipwrecks in April 1820 =

The list of shipwrecks in April 1820 includes ships sunk, wrecked or otherwise lost during April 1820.

== 1 April ==
List of shipwrecks: 1 April 1820
| Ship | State | Description |
|---|---|---|
| Echo | United Kingdom | The whaler was wrecked on the Cato Reef, in the Coral Sea. Her crew were rescued. |

== 2 April ==
List of shipwrecks: 2 April 1820
| Ship | State | Description |
|---|---|---|
| Horatio | United States | The full-rigged ship was lost on the Diamond Shoals, off the coast of North Carolina with the loss of eight lives. |
| Ocean | United States | The ship foundered with the loss of a crew member. She was on a voyage from St. Ubes, Portugal, to Alexandria, Virginia. |
| Rose | United Kingdom | The ship was driven ashore at Margate, Kent. She was on a voyage from Madeira to London. She was refloated the next day and taken in to Margate. |

== 5 April ==
List of shipwrecks: 5 April 1820
| Ship | State | Description |
|---|---|---|
| Perseverance | United Kingdom | The ship ran aground on the Goodwin Sands, Kent. She was on a voyage from Vinaròs, Spain to Bremen. She was refloated with the assistance of two boats and taken in to Ramsgate, Kent. |

== 6 April ==
List of shipwrecks: 6 April 1820
| Ship | State | Description |
|---|---|---|
| Bellona | (United Kingdom of Great Britain and Ireland) Jamaica | The schooner was wrecked on the Mariguana Reef, Jamaica. All on board were rescued by Merlin (United Kingdom). |
| Dash | United Kingdom | The ship was driven ashore and severely damaged at Brighton, Sussex. |

== 7 April ==
List of shipwrecks: 7 April 1820
| Ship | State | Description |
|---|---|---|
| Rock | United Kingdom | The brig ran aground on the Shoals of Grado, in the Adriatic Sea. She was on a voyage from Saint Domingo to Trieste. Rock was refloated on 13 April and taken in to Trieste. |

== 8 April ==
List of shipwrecks: 8 April 1820
| Ship | State | Description |
|---|---|---|
| Equator | Portugal | The ship was beached at Lisbon. She was on a voyage from Barcelona, Spain, to Lisbon. |

== 10 April ==
List of shipwrecks: 10 April 1820
| Ship | State | Description |
|---|---|---|
| Carl Johan | Sweden | The ship foundered off Kalmar. Her crew were rescued. She was on a voyage from London, United Kingdom, to Kalmar. |
| Friendship | United Kingdom | The ship was destroyed by fire at Mauritius. Superior was later refloated and resumed her voyage. |

== 11 April ==
List of shipwrecks: 11 April 1820
| Ship | State | Description |
|---|---|---|
| Hope | United Kingdom | The ship was wrecked on St. Philip's Key, off Cape St. Antonio. Cuba. She was on a voyage from Cuba to Liverpool, Lancashire. |
| Telegraph | United States | The ship was driven ashore and wrecked at Gravesend, Long Island, New York. She was on a voyage from New Orleans, Louisiana, to New York City. |

== 12 April ==
List of shipwrecks: 12 April 1820
| Ship | State | Description |
|---|---|---|
| Maria | United Kingdom | The ship was driven ashore at Tynemouth Castle, Northumberland. She was on a voyage from "Longsound" to Sunderland, County Durham. She was refloated and taken in to Newcastle upon Tyne, Northumberland in a leaky condition. |

== 15 April ==
List of shipwrecks: 15 April 1820
| Ship | State | Description |
|---|---|---|
| Hibernia | United Kingdom | The ship was wrecked near Maldonado, Uruguay. Her crew were rescued. She was on a voyage from Greenock, Renfrewshire, to Buenos Aires, Argentina. |

== 16 April= ==
List of shipwrecks: 16 April 1820
| Ship | State | Description |
|---|---|---|
| Commerce | United Kingdom | The ship collided with ''Aboyne (United Kingdom) and was severely damaged. Commerce was on a voyage from Sheringham, Norfolk to Newcastle upon Tyne, Northumberland. She put in to Yorkshire. |

== 21 April ==
List of shipwrecks: 21 April 1820
| Ship | State | Description |
|---|---|---|
| Echo | United Kingdom | The whaler was wrecked on Cato's Shoal, in the Pacific Ocean. Her crew survived. |

== 25 April ==
List of shipwrecks: 25 April 1820
| Ship | State | Description |
|---|---|---|
| Albion | United Kingdom | The ship was driven ashore near Liverpool, Lancashire. She was on a voyage from Liverpool to New York, United States. She was refloated and resumed her voyage. |
| Neptune | United Kingdom | The ship ran aground on the Sizewell Bank, in the North Sea off the coast of Suffolk. She floated off and consequently foundered. Her crew were rescued. Neptune was on a voyage from South Shields, County Durham, to London. |
| Peggy | United Kingdom | The ship was driven ashore and wrecked at Whitehaven, Cumberland. Her crew were rescued. She was on a voyage from Killough, County Down, to Whitehaven. |

== 26 April ==
List of shipwrecks: 26 April 1820
| Ship | State | Description |
|---|---|---|
| New Society | United Kingdom | The ship sprang a leak and foundered in the Irish Sea off the Isle of Man. Her crew were rescued. She was on a voyage from Whitehaven, Cumberland, to Dublin. |

== 28 April ==
List of shipwrecks: 28 April 1820
| Ship | State | Description |
|---|---|---|
| Flirt | United Kingdom | The ship foundered in the Atlantic Ocean between Padstow and St. Ives, Cornwall. She was on a voyage from Bristol, Gloucestershire, to Portsmouth, Hampshire. |

== 30 April ==
List of shipwrecks: 30 April 1820
| Ship | State | Description |
|---|---|---|
| Staffa | United Kingdom | The schooner was driven ashore and wrecked at Gibraltar. She was on a voyage from Gibraltar to Alicante, Spain. |

== Unknown date ==
List of shipwrecks: Unknown date in April 1820
| Ship | State | Description |
|---|---|---|
| Ann | United Kingdom | The ship was wrecked on South Uist, Outer Hebrides. She was on a voyage from Saint John, New Brunswick, British North America, to Aberdeen. |
| Betsey | United Kingdom | The schooner was wrecked on the coast of Newfoundland, British North America. |
| Elizabeth | United Kingdom | The schooner was wrecked on the coast of Newfoundland. |
| Fortitude | United Kingdom | The ship foundered in British waters. |
| Four Brothers | United Kingdom | The schooner was wrecked on the coast of Newfoundland. |
| Hatt | United Kingdom | The brig was abandoned in the Atlantic Ocean (48°08′N 22°28′W) before 14 April.. Her crew were rescued by Hercules (United Kingdom. Hatt was on a voyage from Torquay, Devon, to Newfoundland, British North America. |
| Havre de Grâce | France | The ship struck a sandbank at the mouth of the Amazon in late April. No further trace, presumed foundered with the loss of all hands. She was on a voyage from Porto, Portugal, to Pará, Brazil. |
| Principe de Beira | Portugal | The schooner was attacked by an insurgent privateer and left in distress. Her crew were rescued by Peter and John (United Kingdom). Principe de Beira was on a voyage from São Miguel Island, Azores, to Figueira da Foz. |
| Quatre Sœurs | France | The ship was wrecked at La Tremblade, Seine-Inférieure, with the loss of all but two of her crew. She was on a voyage from London, United Kingdom, to Bordeaux, Gironde. |
| Sophia | United Kingdom | The schooner was wrecked on the coast of Newfoundland. |
| Star | United Kingdom | The schooner was wrecked on the coast of Newfoundland. |
| St. George | United Kingdom | The ship was driven ashore on Bermuda. |
