= List of shipwrecks in May 1827 =

The list of shipwrecks in May 1827 includes some ships sunk, wrecked or otherwise lost during May 1827.

== 1 May ==
List of shipwrecks: 1 May 1827
Ship	State	Description
Wakefield	United Kingdom	The ship was wrecked on Point-Peters, Gaspé Bay.
Whitby	United Kingdom	The ship was wrecked on Point-Peters. She was on a voyage from Plymouth, Devon to Quebec City, Lower Canada, British North America.

== 2 May ==
List of shipwrecks: 2 May 1827
Ship	State	Description
Belzoni	United Kingdom	The ship was wrecked on Prince Edward Island, British North America.
George Clinton	United States	The ship ran aground in the North East Passage, Belize.
Stockton	United Kingdom	The ship was wrecked on Prince Edward Island.

== 3 May ==
List of shipwrecks: 3 May 1827
Ship	State	Description
Margaret and Ann	United Kingdom	The ship was wrecked on Prince Edward Island, British North America with the loss of all hands.
Pilot	(United Kingdom of Great Britain and Ireland) Grenada	The sloop was wrecked at Bacolet, Grenada.

== 4 May ==
List of shipwrecks: 4 May 1827
Ship	State	Description
Agnes	United Kingdom	The sloop was driven ashore at Llanmadoc, Glamorgan. Her crew survived.

== 5 May ==
List of shipwrecks: 5 May 1827
Ship	State	Description
Harriet	United Kingdom	The ship was driven ashore on Basque Island, Lower Canada, British North America.

== 7 May ==
List of shipwrecks: 7 May 1827
Ship	State	Description
Annanziata	Kingdom of the Two Sicilies	The ship was wrecked on Lipari. She was on a voyage from Livorno, Grand Duchy of Tuscany to Palermo.

== 8 May ==
List of shipwrecks: 8 May 1827
Ship	State	Description
Watson	United Kingdom	The ship was wrecked at Nymindegab, Denmark. Her crew were rescued.

== 14 May ==
List of shipwrecks: 14 May 1827
Ship	State	Description
Universe	United Kingdom	The ship was wrecked on a reef off Dragør, Denmark. She was on a voyage from Memel, Prussia to Hull, Yorkshire.

== 15 May ==
List of shipwrecks: 15 May 1827
Ship	State	Description
George	United Kingdom	The ship was wrecked near Milford Haven, Pembrokeshire.
Roberts	United Kingdom	The ship was driven ashore and wrecked at Sunderland, County Durham. Her crew were rescued. She was on a voyage from Peterhead, Aberdeenshire to Sunderland.

== 17 May ==
List of shipwrecks: 17 May 1827
Ship	State	Description
Commerce	United Kingdom	The ship was wrecked on the Spanish Battery Rocks, North Shields, County Durham.
Dankbarkeit	Danzig	The ship was wrecked on Barra, Outer Hebrides, United Kingdom. Her crew were rescued. She was on a voyage from Danzig to Liverpool, Lancashire, United Kingdom.
Unity	United Kingdom	The ship was wrecked at North Shields.

== 18 May ==
List of shipwrecks: 18 May 1827
Ship	State	Description
Tees	United Kingdom	The ship ran aground on the Haisborough Sands, in the North Sea off the coast of Norfolk and sank.

== 23 May ==
List of shipwrecks: 23 May 1827
Ship	State	Description
Sybilla	United Kingdom	The ship was wrecked at Oban, Argyllshire.

== 26 May ==
List of shipwrecks: 26 May 1827
Ship	State	Description
Alfe	Hamburg	The ship was driven ashore and wrecked at Helsingborg, Sweden. She was on a voyage from Hamburg to Saint Petersburg, Russia.
Cumberland	United Kingdom	The merchant ship departed Hobart, Van Diemen's Land, bound for London and was never heard from again. In 1828, Lloyd's List and newspapers in Van Diemen's Land reported that pirates destroyed her during her voyage and murdered her crew and passengers.

== 27 May ==
List of shipwrecks: 27 May 1827
Ship	State	Description
Hercules	United Kingdom	The ship ran aground on a reef off Skagen, Denmark. She was on a voyage from Gothemburg, Sweden to London. Hercules was refloated on 30 May and taken into Aalborg, Denmark for repairs.
Melville Watson	United Kingdom	The ship was wrecked at Chale, Isle of Wight. Her crew were rescued. She was on a voyage from Jamaica to London.

== 29 May ==
List of shipwrecks: 29 May 1827
Ship	State	Description
Minerva	United Kingdom	The ship was driven ashore near Drogheda, County Louth and was abandoned by her crew. She was refloated on 10 June and taken in to Dundalk, County Louth.

== Unknown date ==
List of shipwrecks: Unknown date in May 1827
Ship	State	Description
Atlantio	Spain	The brig foundered 14 leagues (42 nautical miles (78 km)) off the coast of New York, United States. She was on a voyage from Havana, Cuba to Matanzas.
Carolina	United States	The ship was driven ashore and wrecked on Long Island, New York in early May. All on board were rescued. She was on a voyage from Belfast, County Antrim, United Kingdom to New York City.
