= List of shipwrecks in June 1830 =

The list of shipwrecks in June 1830 includes ships sunk, foundered, grounded, or otherwise lost during June 1830.

== 3 June ==
List of shipwrecks: 3 June 1830
Ship	State	Description
Bridport	United Kingdom	The ship ran aground on the Herd Sand, in the North Sea off North Shields, County Durham. She broke up on 7 June. Bridport was on a voyage from Inverness to North Shields.

== 4 June ==
List of shipwrecks: 4 June 1830
Ship	State	Description
Bridport	United Kingdom	The ship ran aground on the Herd Sand, in the North Sea off South Shields, County Durham. Her crew were rescued. She was on a voyage from Inverness to South Shields. Bridport broke up on 15 June.
Jonge Willem	Netherlands	The ship was sunk by ice at Arkhangelsk, Russia.
Sincerity	United Kingdom	The schooner was wrecked on the Goodwin Sands, Kent with the loss of all hands. She was on a voyage from Sunderland, County Durham to Lymington, Hampshire.

== 5 June ==
List of shipwrecks: 5 June 1830
Ship	State	Description
Louise Maria	Bremen	The ship ran aground on the Lanlutjen Sand, in the North Sea.

== 8 June ==
List of shipwrecks: 8 June 1830
Ship	State	Description
Jane	United Kingdom	The ship foundered in the North Sea off Aldeburgh, Suffolk with some loss of life. Four of her crew were rescued. She was on a voyage from Sunderland, County Durham to Rouen, Seine-Inférieure, France.

== 11 June ==
List of shipwrecks: 11 June 1830
Ship	State	Description
Minerva	United Kingdom	The schooner was driven ashore and wrecked at Ulverston, Lancashire. Her crew were rescued. She was on a voyage from Liverpool, Lancashire to Greenock, Renfrewshire.

== 22 June ==
List of shipwrecks: 22 June 1830
Ship	State	Description
Irish Miner	United Kingdom	The ship was wrecked near Winn's Head, Glamorgan. Her crew were rescued. She was on a voyage from Swansea, Glamorgan to Llanelli, Glamorgan.
John and Jane	United Kingdom	The ship was driven ashore and wrecked in Glenain Bay. She was on a voyage from Belfast, County Down to Glasgow, Renfrewshire.

== 25 June ==
List of shipwrecks: 28 June 1830
Ship	State	Description
Lætitia	United Kingdom	The whaler was lost in the Davis Strait.
Resolution	United Kingdom	The whaler was lost in the Davis Strait.
Rock	United Kingdom	The ship was driven ashore in the Sound of Islay. She was refloated on 29 June and taken in to Port Askaig, Islay.
Princess of Wales	United Kingdom	The whaler was lost in the Davis Strait with the loss of four of her crew.

== 28 June ==
List of shipwrecks: 28 June 1830
Ship	State	Description
Baffin	United Kingdom	The whaler, a full-rigged ship, was sunk by ice in the Davis Strait.
Diamond	United Kingdom	The ship capsized at Barbados.
Rattler	United Kingdom	The whaler was sunk by ice in the Davis Strait.
Ville de Dieppe	United Kingdom	The whaler was abandoned in the Davis Strait.

== 29 June ==
List of shipwrecks: 29 June 1830
Ship	State	Description
Andrew Edwards	(United Kingdom of Great Britain and Ireland) Barbados	The ship was wrecked on the north coast of Guadeloupe. She was on a voyage from St. Thomas, Virgin Islands to Barbados.
Luna	United Kingdom	The ship was abandoned off Knysna, Cape Colony.
Robert	United Kingdom	The ship was driven ashore in Long Bay, Barbados.

== Unknown date ==
List of shipwrecks: Unknown date 1830
Ship	State	Description
Friends	Bremen	The ship wrecked on the Gunfleet Sand, in the North Sea off the coast of Essex, United Kingdom before 11 June.
Jean	United Kingdom	The sloop was driven ashore and wrecked at Banff. She was on a voyage from Sunderland, County Durham to Portsoy, Aberdeenshire.
Sylph	(United Kingdom of Great Britain and Ireland) Tobago	The drogher was wrecked at Tobago before 9 June.
