= List of shipwrecks in June 1834 =

The list of shipwrecks in June 1834 includes ships sunk, foundered, wrecked, grounded or otherwise lost during June 1834.

== 1 June ==
List of shipwrecks: 1 June 1834
Ship	State	Description
Deucaleon	Prussia	The ship was wrecked at Porto, Portugal. Her crew were rescued. She was on a voyage from Memel to Porto.
Ophetting	Netherlands	The ship struck the Arklow Banks, in the Irish Sea and sank. Her crew were rescued. She was on a voyage from Liverpool, Lancashire, United Kingdom to Rotterdam, South Holland.

== 3 June ==
List of shipwrecks: 3 June 1834
Ship	State	Description
Henry Freeling	(United Kingdom of Great Britain and Ireland) Dominica	The drogher was wrecked at Dominica.

== 5 June ==
List of shipwrecks: 5 June 1834
Ship	State	Description
Earl of Liverpool	United Kingdom	The brig was wrecked in the Keeling Islands. Her crew were rescued. she was on a voyage from Singapore to London.

== 6 June ==
List of shipwrecks: 6 June 1834
Ship	State	Description
Providence	United Kingdom	The ship was wrecked on a reef off San Lucar, Spain. She was on a voyage from Porto, Portugal to Cádiz, Spain.

== 7 June ==
List of shipwrecks: 7 June 1834
Ship	State	Description
Akimfi Demidoff	Russia	The brig was wrecked at the mouth of the Somme River, France. Her crew were rescued by pilot boats from Cayeux-sur-Mer, Somme. she was on a voyage from Livorno, Grand Duchy of Tuscany to Amsterdam, North Holland.

== 10 June ==
List of shipwrecks: 10 June 1834
Ship	State	Description
Harriet	United Kingdom	The ship was lost in the Davis Strait. Her crew were rescued.

== 13 June ==
List of shipwrecks: 13 June 1834
Ship	State	Description
Emerald	United Kingdom	The barque ran aground on a reef off Heneaga, Bahamas whilst trying to avoid capture by a pirate schooner. Her crew were murdered and the ship was ransacked. Emerald was on a voyage from Port Morant, Jamaica to London.
Sarah	United Kingdom	The ship struck the breakwater at Plymouth, Devon and was wrecked. All on board were rescued. She was on a voyage from London to Quebec City, Lower Canada, British North America.
Wilhelmina	Hamburg	The ship foundered in the North Sea. Her crew were rescued. She was on a voyage from Sunderland, County Durham, United Kingdom to Hamburg.

== 14 June ==
List of shipwrecks: 14 June 1834
Ship	State	Description
Julia	United Kingdom	The barque was wrecked on the Goodwin Sands. Her crew were rescued. She was on a voyage from Sierra Leone to Sunderland, County Durham.
St. Patrick	United Kingdom	The sloop was wrecked on Carnsore Point, County Wexford with the loss of three of the five people on board.

=== 15 June ===
List of shipwrecks: 15 June 1834
Ship	State	Description
Lord Wellington	United Kingdom	The whaler was lost in Melville Bay, Greenland. Her crew were rescued.

== 19 June ==
List of shipwrecks: 19 June 1834
Ship	State	Description
Hayden	United States	The ship was wrecked on rocks at "Titmanan". She was on a voyage from Boston, Massachusetts to Eastport, Newfoundland, British North America.

== 20 June ==
List of shipwrecks: 20 June 1834
Ship	State	Description
Magdalena	United Kingdom	The ship was wrecked at "Grandress", on the African coast, with the loss of three of her crew.
Malcovia	Spain	The ship was wrecked at the mouth of the Maranhão River, Brazil.

== 23 June ==
List of shipwrecks: 23 June 1834
Ship	State	Description
Industry	United Kingdom	The ship was wrecked at Wilmington, Delaware, United States. She was on a voyage from Wilmington to Liverpool, Lancashire.

== 26 June ==
List of shipwrecks: 26 June 1834
Ship	State	Description
Henrietta	United Kingdom	The ship was driven ashore at Richibucto, New Brunswick, British North America. She was on a voyage from Richibucto to Holyhead, Anglesey.
Richard and Ann	United Kingdom	The ship was driven ashore near Brancaster, Norfolk. She was on a voyage from Waterford to King's Lynn, Norfolk.

== Unknown date ==
List of shipwrecks: Unknown date 1834
Ship	State	Description
Economy	United Kingdom	The ship foundered in the Grand Banks of Newfoundland. Her crew were rescued by Grace (United Kingdom). Economy was on a voyage from Liverpool, Lancashire to Newfoundland, British North America.
Hull	United Kingdom	The ship was destroyed by fire in the Atlantic Ocean. She was on a voyage from Savannah, Georgia, United States to Liverpool, Lancashire.
Jean Stewart	United Kingdom	The ship was wrecked off Barbuda before 23 June. She was on a voyage from Liverpool to Saint Thomas, Virgin Islands.
John and Margaret	United Kingdom	The schooner departed from Westport, County Mayo for London in early June. Presumed subsequently foundered in the Irish Sea with the loss of all hands.
Mary	United Kingdom	The ship was wrecked in St. Paul Island, Nova Scotia, British North America before 30 June with the loss of all but two of her crew. She was on a voyage from Liverpool to Miramichi, New Brunswick, British North America.
Naiad	France	The ship departed from Santiago, Cape Verde Islands, Portugal for Havre de Grâce, Seine-Inférieure in late June. No further trace, presumed foundered with the loss of all hands.
Victory	France	The ship was abandoned in the Grand Banks of Newfoundland. Her sixteen crew were rescued by Hannah (United Kingdom).
