= List of shipwrecks in June 1829 =

The list of shipwrecks in June 1829 includes some ships sunk, wrecked or otherwise lost during June 1829.

== 1 June ==
List of shipwrecks: 1 June 1829
Ship	State	Description
Oscar	India	The ship was on the Arabian Peninsula 10 nautical miles (19 km) south of Cape Rouse. (21°45′N 59°40′E). All on board survived but the ship was plundered by the local inhabitants.

== 2 June ==
List of shipwrecks: 2 June 1829
Ship	State	Description
Tibustina	Argentina	The ship was lost off "Colona".

== 4 June ==
List of shipwrecks: 4 June 1829
Ship	State	Description
USS Fulton	United States Navy	The barracks ship was destroyed by an explosion at Brooklyn Navy Yard, New York City with the loss of 24 lives.

== 6 June ==
List of shipwrecks: 6 June 1829
Ship	State	Description
Lady Monroe	United States	The ship was driven ashore and wrecked near Cape Henry, Virginia. She was on a voyage from Marseille, Bouches-du-Rhône, France to Baltimore, Maryland.
Nelson	United Kingdom	The ship was wrecked in the Andaman Islands. Her crew survived. She was on a voyage from Bengal, India to Mauritius.
Rookwood	United Kingdom	The whaler struck a rock in the Davis Straits north of "Disco" and was beached at "Willifiord", where she was deemed beyond repair. Her crew survived.

== 10 June ==
List of shipwrecks: 10 June 1829
Ship	State	Description
Anna	Prussia	The ship was driven ashore 6 nautical miles (11 km) east of Wells-next-the-Sea, Norfolk, United Kingdom.

== 13 June ==
List of shipwrecks: 13 June 1829
Ship	State	Description
Mermaid	United Kingdom	The ship struck the southeast portion of Flora Reef (17.19923333°S 146.28885°E) and was stranded in place.

== 14 June ==
List of shipwrecks: 14 June 1829
Ship	State	Description
John and Mary	(United Kingdom of Great Britain and Ireland) Jersey	The cutter sprang a leak and foundered off A Coruña, Spain. Her crew were rescued.

== 15 June ==
List of shipwrecks: 15 June 1829
Ship	State	Description
Cæsar	United Kingdom	The ship foundered off Point Cedros, Trinidad.

== 22 June ==
List of shipwrecks: 22 June 1829
Ship	State	Description
Rachel	United Kingdom	The brig ran aground in fog at Crail, Fife and was severely damaged. She was later refloated. Rachel was on a voyage from Leith, Lothian to Newcastle upon Tyne, Northumberland.

== 23 June ==
List of shipwrecks: 23 June 1829
Ship	State	Description
Ardebil (Ардебиль)	Imperial Russian Navy	The brig capsized at the bifurcation of the ru:Bakhtemir distributary in the Volga Delta and was carried about 21 kilometres (13 mi) downstream to Ikryanoye, with the loss of five lives (the captain's family). Subsequently refloated, repaired and returned to service.

== 24 June ==
List of shipwrecks: 24 June 1829
Ship	State	Description
Industry	United Kingdom	The ship was wrecked on "Bruis Island". All on board were rescued. She was on a voyage from Liverpool, Lancashire to Saint John, New Brunswick, British North America.

== 27 June ==
List of shipwrecks: 27 June 1829
Ship	State	Description
Fame	United Kingdom	The ship foundered off Padstow, Cornwall. Her crew were rescued.

== 28 June ==
List of shipwrecks: 28 June 1829
Ship	State	Description
Bellona	United Kingdom	The ship was driven ashore crewless and wrecked at St. Ives, Cornwall.
Peter Challoner	United Kingdom	The ship was lost off Cape Canso, Nova Scotia, British North America. Her crew were rescued.
Princess Royal	(United Kingdom of Great Britain and Ireland) Grenada	The ship capsized in a squall 600 nautical miles (1,100 km) south of Sable Island, Nova Scotia with the loss of two of her crew. Survivors were rescued twelve days later by Rolla (United States). Princess Royal was on a voyage from Quebec City, Lower Canada, British North America to Grenada.

== Unknown date ==
List of shipwrecks: Unknown date in June 1829
Ship	State	Description
Timandra	United Kingdom	The ship sailed from Batavia on 5 June 1829 with a cargo of rice for Antwerp. She was never heard of again.
