= List of shipwrecks in July 1832 =

The list of shipwrecks in July 1832 includes ships sunk, foundered, grounded, or otherwise lost during July 1832.

== 1 July ==
List of shipwrecks: 1 July 1832
Ship	State	Description
Ann	United Kingdom	The ship was wrecked at "St. Brendon's". She was on a voyage from Mauritius to Rangoon, Burma.
Anna	United Kingdom	The ship was wrecked on the Haisborough Sands, in the North Sea off the coast of Norfolk. She was on a voyage from Sunderland, County Durham to Caen, Calvados, France.

== 2 July ==
List of shipwrecks: 2 July 1832
Ship	State	Description
Enterprise	United States	The ship was wrecked on the French Keys. She was on a voyage from Saint Domingue to Boston, Massachusetts.
Isabella	United Kingdom	The ship was wrecked at Mayaguana, Bahamas. She was on a voyage from Halifax, Nova Scotia, British North America to Jamaica.
Marfa (Марфа, 'Martha')	Imperial Russian Navy	The yacht capsized in a squall in the Volga at Tsarevo. Subsequently refloated, repaired and returned to service.

== 4 July ==
List of shipwrecks: 4 July 1832
Ship	State	Description
Beaver	United Kingdom	The brig was run down by an American brig and consequently foundered. All on board were rescued by Quivedo (United Kingdom). Beaver was on a voyage from Saint John's, Newfoundland, British North America to Liverpool, Lancashire.

== 5 July ==
List of shipwrecks: 5 July 1832
Ship	State	Description
Paragon	United Kingdom	The ship was wrecked on the south coast of Barbados. Her crew were rescued. She was on a voyage from Demerara to the Clyde.

== 6 July ==
List of shipwrecks: 6 July 1832
Ship	State	Description
Fruit Preserver	United Kingdom	The schooner was driven ashore and wrecked at Trinidad, Cuba.
Octavo de Octubre	Spain	The brig was driven ashore and wrecked at Trinidad, Cuba.

== 8 July ==
List of shipwrecks: 8 July 1832
Ship	State	Description
Marian	United Kingdom	The ship capsized and sank in the North Sea off Saltfleet, Lincolnshire with the loss of a crew member. She was on a voyage from Hull, Yorkshire to London.

== 10 July ==
List of shipwrecks: 10 July 1832
Ship	State	Description
Susan	United States	The ship was destroyed by fire at North Island, South Carolina. Her crew survived. She was on a voyage from New York to New Orleans, Louisiana.

== 12 July ==
List of shipwrecks: 12 July 1832
Ship	State	Description
Wilton	United Kingdom	The ship was in collision with Perseverance (United Kingdom) and was consequently abandoned. She was on a voyage from Quebec City, Lower Canada, British North America to a port in County Clare.

== 13 July ==
List of shipwrecks: 13 July 1832
Ship	State	Description
Meredith	United Kingdom	The ship was wrecked on the bar at the mouth of the Hokianga Harbour, New Zealand, where it had arrived from the Sandwich Islands. All crew survived.

== 15 July ==
List of shipwrecks: 15 July 1832
Ship	State	Description
Ann	United Kingdom	The ship was wrecked on Bornholm, Denmark. Her crew were rescued. She was on a voyage from Hull, Yorkshire to Vyborg, Grand Duchy of Finland.

== 20 July ==
List of shipwrecks: 20 July 1832
Ship	State	Description
Princess Victoria	United Kingdom	The ship foundered in the Arctic Ocean off Cape Sweetnose, Russia with some loss of life.

== 22 July ==
List of shipwrecks: 22 July 1832
Ship	State	Description
Borneo	United Kingdom	The whaler was wrecked on a coral reef east of the Comoros Islands.
Julia	United Kingdom	The ship was wrecked on the Scorpion Bank. She was on a voyage from Havana, Cuba to "Laguira".

== 28 July ==
List of shipwrecks: 28 July 1832
Ship	State	Description
John Adams	United States	The whaler was attacked and sunk by a whale in the Atlantic Ocean off Faial, Azores, Portugal with the loss of seventeen of her 23 crew. The survivors were rescued by Orbita (United States).
Jumelles	France	The ship foundered whilst on a voyage from Marseille, Bouches-du-Rhône to Brest, Finistère.

== 31 July ==
List of shipwrecks: 31 July 1832
Ship	State	Description
Ferdinand	France	The ship was wrecked near Saint-Louis, Senegal.
Richard and Sibella	United Kingdom	The ship was driven ashore and wrecked at Falmouth, Jamaica.

== Unknown date ==
List of shipwrecks: Unknown date 1832
Ship	State	Description
Euprosine	France	The ship was wrecked on the coast of Newfoundland, British North America.
Isabella	United Kingdom	The brig foundered in the Grand Banks of Newfoundland. All on board, over 280 people, were rescued. She was on a voyage from Galway to New York, United States.
Restaurador	Portugal	The ship was in collision with Madeira (Spain off Madeira and foundered. She had been captured by Madeira the previous month.
Tartar	United Kingdom	The ship sprang a leak and was abandoned. Her crew were rescued by Margaret (United Kingdom). Tartar was on a voyage from Gothenburg, Sweden to London.
Uranus	(Denmark) Duchy of Schleswig	The ship was driven ashore and wrecked on Samsø, Denmark before 27 July. She was on a voyage from Liverpool, Lancashire, United Kingdom to Flensburg.
William the Fourth	United Kingdom	The ship was in collision with another vessel in the Atlantic Ocean (33°20′N 67°00′W) and foundered. Her crew survived. She was on a voyage from Havana, Cuba to Guernsey, Channel Islands.
