= List of shipwrecks in July 1827 =

The list of shipwrecks in July 1827 includes some ships sunk, wrecked or otherwise lost during July 1827.

== 2 July ==
List of shipwrecks: 2 July 1827
Ship	State	Description
Betsey	United Kingdom	The ship capsized and sank off Arendal, Norway. Her crew were rescued. She was on a voyage from Saint Petersburg, Russia to Dundee, Forfarshire.
Fancy	United Kingdom	The ship capsized and sank in the Baltic Sea 80 nautical miles (150 km) west of Memel, Prussia. Her crew were rescued. She was on a voyage from Memel to Hull, Yorkshire.

== 3 July ==
List of shipwrecks: 3 July 1827
Ship	State	Description
Vestovoy (Вестовой, 'Orderly')	Imperial Russian Navy	The 44-gun frigate ran aground on the et:Kuradimuna Bank in the Gulf of Finland, and became a wreck on 6 July. Her crew were rescued. She was on a voyage from Kronstadt to Reval. The wreck subsequently floated to Mohni and was dismantled there.

== 10 July ==
List of shipwrecks: 10 July 1827
Ship	State	Description
Mary	United Kingdom	The ship was wrecked on Læsø, Denmark. Her crew were rescued. She was on a voyage from Newcastle upon Tyne, Northumberland to "Cullendbay".
Pomona	United Kingdom	The ship capsized and sank off Domesnes, Norway with the loss of three of her crew. She was on a voyage from Riga, Russia to London.

== 11 July ==
List of shipwrecks: 11 July 1827
Ship	State	Description
Dorothea	Prussia	The ship capsized in the Baltic Sea. All on board were rescued. She was on a voyage from Memel to Lübeck.
Versuch	Prussia	The ship was driven ashore and wrecked at Memel. Her crew were rescued. She was on a voyage from Memel to Nantes, Loire-Inférieure, France.

== 12 July ==
List of shipwrecks: 12 July 1827
Ship	State	Description
Margaret	United Kingdom	The ship was driven ashore and wrecked at Memel, Prussia with the loss of four of her seven crew. She was on a voyage from Riga, Russia to Sunderland, County Durham.

== 14 July ==
List of shipwrecks: 14 July 1827
Ship	State	Description
Falcon	United States	The sloop was wrecked on the Cape Lookout Shoals, off the coast of North Carolina with the loss of ten of the 26 people on board.

== 16 July ==
List of shipwrecks: 16 July 1827
Ship	State	Description
Velona	United Kingdom	The ship sprang a leak in the Atlantic Ocean and was abandoned by her crew. They were rescued by Alert (United Kingdom).

== 23 July ==
List of shipwrecks: 23 July 1827
Ship	State	Description
Imperial	United Kingdom	The ship was wrecked on the French Keys. All on board were rescued. Imperial was the return leg of her maiden voyage, sailing from Kingston, Jamaica to Hull, Yorkshire.

== 26 July ==
List of shipwrecks: 26 July 1827
Ship	State	Description
Agnes	United Kingdom	The brig was driven ashore and wrecked at Brighton, Sussex. Her crew were rescued.
Dash	United Kingdom	The brig was driven ashore and wrecked at Brighton. Her crew were rescued.

== 28 July ==
List of shipwrecks: 28 July 1827
Ship	State	Description
Mercury	United Kingdom	The whaler was lost in the Davis Strait.

== 31 July ==
List of shipwrecks: 31 July 1827
Ship	State	Description
Seine	France	The ship departed from St. Jago de Cuba, Cuba for Bordeaux, Gironde. No further tace, presumed foundered in the Atlantic Ocean with the loss of all hands.
