= List of shipwrecks in April 1827 =

The list of shipwrecks in April 1827 includes some ships sunk, wrecked or otherwise lost during April 1827.

== 2 April ==
List of shipwrecks: 2 April 1827
Ship	State	Description
Catherine	United Kingdom	The ship was in collision with Catherine Eagdalena ( Rostock) in the North Sea and sank. Her crew were rescued. She was on a voyage from King's Lynn, Norfolk to Hull, Yorkshire.

== 13 April ==
List of shipwrecks: 13 April 1827
Ship	State	Description
Aries	United Kingdom	The ship was wrecked on Stroma, Caithness. Her crew were rescued.

== 19 April ==
List of shipwrecks: 19 April 1827
Ship	State	Description
Eclipse	United Kingdom	The ship capsized and sank in the Bristol Channel 6 nautical miles (11 km) east of Ilfracombe, Devon with the loss of two of her seven crew. Survivors were rescued by Betsey and Nancy (United Kingdom. Eclipse was on a voyage from London to Bristol, Gloucestershire.

== 21 April ==
List of shipwrecks: 21 April 1827
Ship	State	Description
Briton	United Kingdom	The ship was wrecked on Cabo Corrientes, Cuba. Her crew were rescued. She was on a voyage from Jamaica to London.
Hero	United Kingdom	The ship was wrecked at Kingstown, County Dublin. She was on a voyage from Dublin to Preston, Lancashire.

== 23 April ==
List of shipwrecks: 23 April 1827
Ship	State	Description
Pigott	United Kingdom	The ship was wrecked on the Bemina or Turtle Keys. Her crew were rescued. She was on a voyage from Jamaica to London.

== 24 April ==
List of shipwrecks: 24 April 1827
Ship	State	Description
Industry	United Kingdom	The ship was wrecked near Cushendall, County Antrim. She was on a voyage from Belfast, County Antrim to Liverpool, Lancashire.
Venus	United Kingdom	The collier, a brig, was driven ashore and wrecked at Brighton, Sussex.

== 25 April ==
List of shipwrecks: 25 April 1827
Ship	State	Description
Scorpion	United Kingdom	The ship was wrecked on the Memory Rock, Bermuda. Her crew were rescued. She was on a voyage from Jamaica to London.

== 26 April ==
List of shipwrecks: 26 April 1827
Ship	State	Description
Almira	United States	The schooner was run down and sunk in the Atlantic Ocean by Iris (United Kingdom). Her ten crew were rescued by Iris. She was on a voyage from Saint-Domingue to New York.

== 27 April ==
List of shipwrecks: 27 April 1827
Ship	State	Description
Pigot	United Kingdom	The ship was wrecked at Bimini. Her crew were rescued. She was on a voyage from Jamaica to London.

== 29 April ==
List of shipwrecks: 29 April 1827
Ship	State	Description
Hope	United Kingdom	The barque was lost in the River Derwent, Van Diemen's Land.
Resolution	United Kingdom	The ship struck the Orange Keys and was consequently abandoned by her crew. She was on a voyage from New Orleans, Louisiana, United States to Liverpool, Lancashire.

== 30 April ==
List of shipwrecks: 30 April 1827
Ship	State	Description
Perceval	United Kingdom	The ship was driven ashore and wrecked in the St. Lawrence River at L'Islet, Lower Canada, British North America, 30 nautical miles (56 km) downstream of Quebec City, Lower Canada with the loss of 23 lives. She was on a voyage from Belfast, County Antrim to Quebec City.
Rob Roy	United Kingdom	The ship was driven ashore in the Saint. Lawrence River 45 nautical miles (83 km) downstream of Quebec City.

== Unknown date ==
List of shipwrecks: Unknown date in April 1827
Ship	State	Description
Apollo	(United Kingdom of Great Britain and Ireland) New South Wales	The brig was wrecked on Maria Island, Van Diemen's Land. her crew were rescued, She was on a voyage from Hobart to Port Dalrymple.
Betsey	United Kingdom	The ship foundered in the South Atlantic off Cape St. Rocque, Brazil. She was on a voyage from Pernambuco to Maranhão, Brazil.
Charles	United Kingdom	The brig foundered in the English Channel off Portland Bill, Dorset before 7 April with the loss of all hands.
Crabb	Netherlands	The ship foundered in the North Sea off Ostend, West Flanders before 10 April with some loss of life.
Greyhound	Netherlands	The ship foundered in the North Sea off Ostend before 10 April with some loss of life.
L'Etoile	(United Kingdom of Great Britain and Ireland) Mauritius	The brig foundered in the Indian Ocean off Île Bourbon with the loss of all ut two of her crew.
Poula	Imperial Brazilian Navy	The frigate was lost on Point Laura before 17 April.
Senta or Sentor	United Kingdom	The ship was driven ashore and wrecked north of Cape St. Rocque. She was on a voyage from Liverpool, Lancashire to Pernambuco.
St. Antonio	Netherlands	The ship foundered in the North Sea off Ostend before 10 April with some loss of life.
