= List of shipwrecks in July 1831 =

The list of shipwrecks in July 1831 includes ships sunk, foundered, grounded, or otherwise lost during July 1831.

== 5 July ==
List of shipwrecks: 5 July 1831
Ship	State	Description
James	United Kingdom	The ship was wrecked on the Fish Key. Her crew were rescued. She was on a voyage from Savanilla, near Puerto Colombia, to Liverpool, Lancashire.

== 7 July ==
List of shipwrecks: 7 July 1831
Ship	State	Description
Sylvia	United Kingdom	The ship was wrecked on the Florida Reef. All on board were rescued. She was on a voyage from Jamaica to Boston, Massachusetts, United States.

== 11 July ==
List of shipwrecks: 11 July 1831
Ship	State	Description
Ann	United Kingdom	The ship was wrecked off the mouth of the Brass River, Africa.
George	United Kingdom	The ship was in collision with Pearl (United Kingdom) off "Dunlington" and sank. Her crew were rescued. George was on a voyage from South Shields, County Durham to London.

== 12 July ==
List of shipwrecks: 12 July 1831
Ship	State	Description
Cerus	United Kingdom	The ship ran aground on the Barber Sand, in the North Sea off the coast of Norfolk. She was consequently beached at Great Yarmouth.
William	United Kingdom	The ship ran aground off Goswick, Northumberland. She was on a voyage from Miramichi, New Brunswick, British North America to Newcastle upon Tyne, Northumberland.

== 13 July ==
List of shipwrecks: 13 July 1831
Ship	State	Description
Eden	United Kingdom	The ship ran aground in the Elbe and was severely damaged. She was on a voyage from London to Hamburg.

== 16 July ==
List of shipwrecks: 16 July 1831
Ship	State	Description
Conch	United Kingdom	The ship was driven ashore and wrecked in Table Bay. Her crew survived.
Gandian	United Kingdom	The ship was driven ashore and wrecked in Table Bay. Her crew survived.
Lord Whitworth	United Kingdom	The ship was wrecked on Bic Island, Lower Canada, British North America. She was on a voyage from London to Quebec City, Lower Canada.
Rambler	United Kingdom	The ship was driven ashore and wrecked in Table Bay. Her crew survived.
Sir J. Saumarez	United Kingdom	The ship was driven ashore and wrecked in Table Bay. Her crew survived.
Terra Nova	United Kingdom	The ship was driven ashore and wrecked in Table Bay. Her crew survived.
Thomas	(United Kingdom of Great Britain and Ireland) Saint Lucia	The drogher was lost off Point Michelle, Dominica with the loss of eight lives.
Usk	United Kingdom	The ship was driven ashore and wrecked in Table Bay.
Vine	United States	The brig was driven ashore and wrecked in Table Bay.

== 18 July ==
List of shipwrecks: 18 July 1831
Ship	State	Description
Caledonia	United Kingdom	The ship was wrecked on Hiiumaa, Russia. Her crew were rescued.

== 21 July ==
List of shipwrecks: 21 July 1831
Ship	State	Description
Friends	United Kingdom	The ship was driven ashore and wrecked at Liverpool, Lancashire. Her crew were rescued. She was on a voyage from Liverpool to Kirkcudbright.

== 26 July ==
List of shipwrecks: 26 July 1831
Ship	State	Description
Henry Clay	United States	The schooner capsized and sank in Lake Erie with the loss of six lives. She was on her maiden voyage from Oswego, New York to Cleveland, Ohio.

== 29 July ==
List of shipwrecks: 29 July 1831
Ship	State	Description
No. 2	Imperial Russian Navy	The transport ship ran aground coming out of the mouth of the Sulina branch of the Danube and was wrecked the next day. Her crew survived. She was on her way to Nikolayev.

== Unknown date ==
List of shipwrecks: Unknown date 1831
Ship	State	Description
Jean	United Kingdom	The ship was wrecked 20 nautical miles (37 km) north of Bombay, India. All on board were rescued.
Maria Theresa	Portugal	The ship was lost in the Quillimane River, Africa with the loss of all but three of her crew.
USS Sylph	United States Navy	The schooner departed from Pensacola, Florida in July and vanished, possibly lost in a severe storm in August. Lost with all 13 crew.
