= List of shipwrecks in June 1831 =

The list of shipwrecks in June 1831 includes ships sunk, foundered, grounded, or otherwise lost during June 1831.

== 4 June ==
List of shipwrecks: 4 June 1831
Ship	State	Description
Friends	United Kingdom	The ship capsized in the Atlantic Ocean with the loss of two of her crew. She was on a voyage from Quebec City, Lower Canada, British North America to Bridgwater, Somerset.
Home	United States	The steamboat was destroyed by fire at Beavertown, Pennsylvania. All on board were rescued.

== 7 June ==
List of shipwrecks: 7 June 1831
Ship	State	Description
General Jackson	United States	The steamboat suffered a boiler explosion and sank in Haverstraw Bay with the loss of at least two lives. She was on a voyage from New York City to Peekskill, New York.
Jane Young	United Kingdom	The ship was driven ashore and wrecked south of the Bassein Fort, India. She was on a voyage from London to Bombay, India.

== 12 June ==
List of shipwrecks: 12 June 1831
Ship	State	Description
Dee	United Kingdom	The ship was destroyed by fire at Bonny, Nigeria.

== 15 June ==
List of shipwrecks: 15 June 1831
Ship	State	Description
Superior	United States	The ship was wrecked off Crooked Island, Bahamas. Her crew were rescued. She was on a voyage from New York to Jamaica.

== 18 June ==
List of shipwrecks: 18 June 1831
Ship	State	Description
Amethyst	United Kingdom	The ship sank at Halifax, Nova Scotia, British North America.
Eliza	United Kingdom	The ship was driven ashore and wrecked at Halifax.
Supply	United Kingdom	The ship was driven ashore and wrecked at Halifax.

== 20 June ==
List of shipwrecks: 20 June 1831
Ship	State	Description
America	United Kingdom	The ship was wrecked on Wreck Island. Her crew survived. She was on a voyage from Hobart, Van Diemens Land to Batavia, Netherlands East Indies.

== 21 June ==
List of shipwrecks: 21 June 1831
Ship	State	Description
William and Elizabeth	United Kingdom	The ship sprang a leak and foundered in the Baltic Sea off Götaland, Sweden. Her crew were rescued. She was on a voyage from South Shields, County Durham to Saint Petersburg, Russia

== 23 June ==
List of shipwrecks: 23 June 1831
Ship	State	Description
Avon	United Kingdom	The ship was driven ashore and wrecked at Tobago.

== 25 June ==
List of shipwrecks: 25 June 1831
Ship	State	Description
St. Johannes	Denmark	The ship foundered in the North Sea off Mandahl, Norway. She was on a voyage from Copenhagen to Hull, Yorkshire, United Kingdom.

== 28 June ==
List of shipwrecks: 28 June 1831
Ship	State	Description
Eliza	United Kingdom	The ship was wrecked on Great Wass Island, Maine, United States. Her crew were rescued.
London	United Kingdom	The ship was wrecked on a reef off Port Medway, Nova Scotia, British North America. She was on a voyage from Port Medway to Liverpool, Lancashire.

== Unknown date ==
List of shipwrecks: Unknown date 1831
Ship	State	Description
Conceicão	Portugal	The ship was driven ashore and wrecked 20 leagues (60 nautical miles (110 km)) south west of Bahia, Brazil. Her crew were rescued. She was on a voyage from Macao to Bahia.
Fame	United Kingdom	The ship struck a rock and sank off South Uist, Outer Hebrides. She was subsequently declared a constructive total loss.
Frederick	(United Kingdom of Great Britain and Ireland) New South Wales	The ship foundered off Port Stephen with the loss of all hands. She was on a voyage from Sydney to Newcastle.
Shannon	United Kingdom	The ship was wrecked on Saaremaa, Russia. Her crew were rescued.
