= List of shipwrecks in August 1828 =

The list of shipwrecks in August 1828 includes all ships sunk, foundered, grounded, or otherwise lost during August 1828.

== 6 August ==
List of shipwrecks: 6 August 1828
Ship	State	Description
Henrietta	United Kingdom	The ship was in collision with Israel (United Kingdom) and was abandoned by her crew. She was on a voyage from Limerick to London.

== 8 August ==
List of shipwrecks: 8 August 1828
Ship	State	Description
Sarah	United Kingdom	The ship ran aground and sank at No Man's Land, Massachusetts, United States. She was on a voyage from New York, United States to Saint John, New Brunswick, British North America.

== 9 August ==
List of shipwrecks: 9 August 1828
Ship	State	Description
Alexander	United Kingdom	The ship was driven ashore in the River Thames at Gravesend, Kent. She was on a voyage from Ceylon to London.
Seaflower	United Kingdom	The sloop was driven ashore and wrecked at Rhosilli, Glamorgan. Her crew survived.
Speculator	United Kingdom	The sloop capsized and sank off The Mumbles, Glamorgan. Her crew were rescued by the steamship Palmerston (United Kingdom).

== 10 August ==
List of shipwrecks: 10 August 1828
Ship	State	Description
Despatch	United Kingdom	The ship was wrecked near "Cape Roan" with the loss of over 50 lives.

== 12 August ==
List of shipwrecks: 12 August 1828
Ship	State	Description
William and Mary	United Kingdom	The ship foundered in Oxwich Bay. Her crew survived. She was on a voyage from Plymouth, Devon to Neath, Glamorgan.

== 14 August ==
List of shipwrecks: 14 August 1828
Ship	State	Description
Alexander	United Kingdom	The ship was driven ashore and wrecked at Oye-Plage, Pas-de-Calais, France. Her crew were rescued.
Perseverance	United Kingdom	The ship was wrecked on the Buney Sand, in the North Sea. Her crew were rescued.
Unity	United Kingdom	The ship ran aground on the Shipwash Sand, in the North Sea off the coast of Essex and was abandoned by her crew.

== 15 August ==
List of shipwrecks: 15 August 1828
Ship	State	Description
Wilhelm	Norway	The ship was driven ashore and wrecked at Ostend, West Flanders, Netherlands.

== 16 August ==
List of shipwrecks: 16 August 1828
Ship	State	Description
Dee	United Kingdom	The ship sprang a leak and foundered in the North Sea off Heligoland with the loss of her captain.
Seaflower	United Kingdom	The sloop was driven ashore and wrecked near Rhossili, Glamorgan. Her crew survived.
Speculator	United Kingdom	The sloop capsized and sank in the Bristol Channel off Mumbles Head, Glamorgan. Her crew were rescued by the steamship Palmerston (United Kingdom).

== 19 August ==
List of shipwrecks: 19 August 1828
Ship	State	Description
Letitia	United Kingdom	The ship was wrecked on Santiago, Cape Verde Islands. All on board were rescued by Mary (United Kingdom). She was on a voyage from Cork to New South Wales.
Philip Dundas	(United Kingdom of Great Britain and Ireland) New South Wales	The ship was driven ashore and wrecked at Port Elizabeth, Cape Colony with the loss of two of her crew.

== 20 August ==
List of shipwrecks: 20 August 1828
Ship	State	Description
Huzzar	United States	Cisplatine War: The schooner brig was set afire and destroyed at Buenos Aires, Argentina, by the Brazilian Navy.
Lord Eldon	United Kingdom	Cisplatine War: The brig was set afire and destroyed at Buenos Aires, Argentina, by the Brazilian Navy.

== 22 August ==
List of shipwrecks: 22 August 1828
Ship	State	Description
Integrity	United Kingdom	The ship was run down and sunk in the North Sea off Orfordness, Suffolk by Juliana ( (United Kingdom of Great Britain and Ireland) Guernsey). Her crew were rescued.

== 23 August ==
List of shipwrecks: 23 August 1828
Ship	State	Description
Rosa	United Kingdom	The ship capsized and sank in a squall in the Kattegat with the loss of four of her five crew. Her captain survived and was rescued by Flora (Prussia). Rosa was on a voyage from Pillau, Prussia to London.

== 25 August ==
List of shipwrecks: 25 August 1828
Ship	State	Description
Edgar	United Kingdom	The ship was wrecked 5 nautical miles (9.3 km) south of Lough Garlock. She was on a voyage from Liverpool, Lancashire to Wick, Caithness.

== 26 August ==
List of shipwrecks: 26 August 1828
Ship	State	Description
Mangrove Bay	United Kingdom	The ship was destroyed by fire at Demerara.
William and Mary	United Kingdom	The ship foundered in Oxwich Bay. Her crew were rescued.

== 30 August ==
List of shipwrecks: 30 August 1828
Ship	State	Description
Skelton	United Kingdom	The ship struck a rock and foundered 10 nautical miles (19 km) off Antigua Her crew were rescued. She was on a voyage from Trinidad to London.

== 31 August ==
List of shipwrecks: 31 August 1828
Ship	State	Description
Prince Kutusoff	Russia	The ship caught fire in the King's Dock, Liverpool, Lancashire, United Kingdom and was scuttled.

== Unknown date ==
List of shipwrecks: Unknown date in August 1828
Ship	State	Description
Philip Dundas	United Kingdom	The ship was wrecked at the Cape of Good Hope before 28 August.
HMS Redpole	Royal Navy	The Cherokee-class brig-sloop was sunk in the Atlantic Ocean off Cabo Frio, Brazil by Congress ( Pirates).
