= List of shipwrecks in the 13th century =

The list of shipwrecks in the 13th century includes some ships sunk, wrecked or otherwise lost between (and including) the years 1201 to 1300.

1231

- Unidentified: The ship foundered off the Isle of Wight, England. She was on a voyage from Nantes (Kingdom of France) to London, England with a cargo of lampreys for King Henry III.

1280

- (First report) — Unidentified: Stranded and a total loss at Bridport, Dorset.

1281

- 15 – 17 August — A tempest struck the Tsushima Strait, lasting two full days and destroyed most of the Yuan fleet which was attempting to invade Japan. Contemporary Japanese reports estimated 4,000 ships were destroyed. The Battle of Kōan (also known as the Second Battle of Hakata Bay) was the second attempt by Kublai Khan to invade Japan.

1284

- (First report) — Unidentified: Two lives lost when a boat struck a rock near the tithing of Kelynack, St Just, Cornwall.
