= List of shipwrecks in July 1829 =

The list of shipwrecks in July 1829 includes some ships sunk, wrecked or otherwise lost during July 1829.

== 1 July ==
List of shipwrecks: 1 July 1829
Ship	State	Description
Adventure	United Kingdom	The ship was driven ashore and wrecked at Sidmouth, Devon.
Prince William	United Kingdom	The sloop was driven ashore and wrecked near Bridport, Dorset with the loss of her captain. Three crew members were rescued. She was on a voyage from Newry, County Antrim to Bridport.
Rose	United Kingdom	The ship was driven ashore and wrecked at Sidmouth with the loss of a crew member.
Union	United Kingdom	The ship was driven ashore in Whitsand Bay. Her crew were rescued.

== 2 July ==
List of shipwrecks: 2 July 1829
Ship	State	Description
Thomas	United Kingdom	The sloop was wrecked in the Bay of Largo. All on board were rescued.

== 4 July ==
List of shipwrecks: 4 July 1829
Ship	State	Description
Briton	United Kingdom	The ship was driven ashore and severely damaged at Mockbeggar, Cheshire.
Swiftsure	United Kingdom	The barque was wrecked at Cape Sidmouth, New South Wales (modern Queensland). Resource (United Kingdom) rescued all aboard. Swiftsure was on a voyage from New South Wales to Mauritius.
William	United Kingdom	The ship was wrecked on the Gunfleet Sand, in the North Sea off the coast of Essex. She was on a voyage from Riga, Russia to London.

== 5 July ==
List of shipwrecks: 5 July 1829
Ship	State	Description
Carn Brea Castle	United Kingdom	The East Indiaman struck rocks off Sudmore Point, Isle of Wight. She was refloated but came ashore at "Metteston" and was wrecked. All on board were rescued. "Cambria Castle" was on a voyage from Portsmouth, Hampshire to Calcutta, India.

== 11 July ==
List of shipwrecks: 11 July 1829
Ship	State	Description
Swallow	United Kingdom	The schooner was wrecked off Pico, Azores, Portugal with the loss of a crew member. She was on a voyage from Faial, Azores to Plymouth, Devon.
No. 10	Imperial Russian Navy	Russo-Turkish War: The ship sprang a severe leak and foundered in the Black Sea. All on board were rescued. She was transporting troops from Sevastopol to Sozopol.

== 14 July ==
List of shipwrecks: 14 July 1829
Ship	State	Description
Queen Caroline	United Kingdom	The ship foundered in the Irish Sea. Her crew were rescued by Friends (United Kingdom). She was on a voyage from Youghal, County Cork to Bristol, Gloucestershire.

== 16 July ==
List of shipwrecks: 16 July 1829
Ship	State	Description
Squirrel	United Kingdom	The ship ran aground on the Haisborough Sands, in the North Sea off the coast of Norfolk and foundered. Her crew survived.

== 18 July ==
List of shipwrecks: 18 July 1829
Ship	State	Description
Union	United Kingdom	The ship was driven ashore and wrecked at Dingle, county Kerry.

== 19 July ==
List of shipwrecks: 19 July 1829
Ship	State	Description
Émile	France	The ship foundered on this date.
William	United Kingdom	The ship capsized and sank at Bremen.
Phoenix	United Kingdom	The merchant ship was wrecked at Simon's Bay, South Africa, at 34°11.388′S 18°26.898′E. Her passengers survived.

== 22 July ==
List of shipwrecks: 22 July 1829
Ship	State	Description
Elizabeth Maria	Norway	The ship ran aground on the Lemon and Ower Sand, in the North Sea. Her crew were rescued.

== 23 July ==
List of shipwrecks: 23 July 1829
Ship	State	Description
Waldo	United Kingdom	The ship was wrecked near Bahia, Empire of Brazil. She was on a voyage from Liverpool, Lancashire to Bahia.

== 28 July ==
List of shipwrecks: 28 July 1829
Ship	State	Description
Hermes	United Kingdom	The ship capsized in the Gulf of Venice. Her crew were rescued.

== 29 July ==
List of shipwrecks: 29 July 1829
Ship	State	Description
Briton	United Kingdom	The ship was in collision with North Ash (United Kingdom) in the English Channel 8 nautical miles (15 km) off St. Alban's Head, Dorset and sank. There were no casualties amongst her seven crew.
Louisa	United Kingdom	The ship was wrecked on the Mizen Sand. She was on a voyage from Bengal, India to Singapore.

== 30 July ==
List of shipwrecks: 30 July 1829
Ship	State	Description
Onslow	United Kingdom	The ship sprang a leak and foundered. Her crew survived. She was on a voyage from Trinidad to Liverpool, Lancashire.

== Unknown date ==
List of shipwrecks: Unknown date in July 1829
Ship	State	Description
Corneille	France	The steamship was driven ashore and wrecked on Île Bourbon before 14 July.
Perseverance	Greece	The steamship was sunk at Volos by a Royal Navy ship.
