= List of shipwrecks in August 1821 =

The list of shipwrecks in August 1821 includes ships sunk, wrecked or otherwise lost during August 1821.

== 2 August ==
List of shipwrecks: 2 August 1821
Ship	State	Description
Adele and Marie	United Kingdom	The ship was wrecked on the coast of Patagonia. Her crew were rescued by Comete (France.
Carlton	United Kingdom	The ship was driven ashore on Faial, Azores, Portugal.
Mary Ann	United Kingdom	The ship was driven ashore and wrecked on Rathlin Island, County Antrim. She was on a voyage from Maryport, Cumberland to Londonderry.
Prince Leopold	United Kingdom	The ship was driven ashore in the Hampton Roads, Virginia, United States.

== 8 August ==
List of shipwrecks: 8 August 1821
Ship	State	Description
Diana	United Kingdom	The ship was driven ashore on Hillberry Island, in the River Dee. She was on a voyage from Miramichi, New Brunswick, British North America to Chester. Diana was later refloated and taken in to "Doxpool".

== 9 August ==
List of shipwrecks: 9 August 1821
Ship	State	Description
Earl of Moira	United Kingdom	The ship struck a rock and foundered in Liverpool Bay off Hoylake, Lancashire with great loss of life. The Hoylake Lifeboat rescued 50-60 people. Earl of Moira was reported to be carrying up to 200 passengers in addition to her crew. There were 120 survivors, but only one crew member was amongst them. She was on a voyage from Liverpool, Lancashire to Dublin Also reported wrecked on the Burbo Bank.

== 10 August ==
List of shipwrecks: 10 August 1821
Ship	State	Description
Isabella	United Kingdom	The sloop was destroyed by fire at Greenock, Renfrewshire.
Lady Lushington	United Kingdom	The East Indiaman was lost near Vizigapatam, India with the loss of fourteen lives. She was on a voyage from London to Madras and Bengal, India.
Leviathan	United Kingdom	The ship was driven ashore in the River Alt. She was on a voyage from Campeche, Mexico to Liverpool, Lancashire. She was later refloated and taken in to Liverpool.

== 11 August ==
List of shipwrecks: 11 August 1821
Ship	State	Description
Hope	United Kingdom	The ship capsized at St. Andrews, New Brunswick, British North America. She was declared a total loss.
Lady Lushington	United Kingdom	The ship was driven ashore and wrecked 30 nautical miles (56 km) north of the mouth of the Koringa River with the loss of seventeen lives. She was on a voyage from Colombo, Ceylon to Calcutta, India.

== 12 August ==
List of shipwrecks: 12 August 1821
Ship	State	Description
Mary	United Kingdom	The ship sprang a leak and was beached at Dunmore, Ireland. She was on a voyage from Dungarvan, County Antrim to Liverpool, Lancashire.

== 14 August ==
List of shipwrecks: 14 August 1821
Ship	State	Description
Blucher	United Kingdom	The ship departed from Jamaica for St. Thomas, Virgin Islands, Bermuda and New Brunswick, British North America. No further trace, presumed foundered with the loss of all hands.
Elizabeth	United Kingdom	The ship was wrecked in the Magdalen Islands, British North America. Her crew were rescued. She was on a voyage from North Shields, County Durham to Miramichi Bay.
General Brown	United States	The ship was wrecked on the Anegada Shoal, Virgin Islands.
Johanna	Prussia	The ship was driven ashore near Pillau. She was on a voyage from Hamburg to Memel.

== 15 August ==
List of shipwrecks: 15 August 1821
Ship	State	Description
Ann & Jane	United Kingdom	The ship foundered off North Foreland, Kent. Her crew survived. She was on a voyage from Blyth, Northumberland to Portsmouth, Hampshire.

== 16 August ==
List of shipwrecks: 16 August 1821
Ship	State	Description
Andromache	United Kingdom	The ship foundered whilst on a voyage from Liverpool, Lancashire to Tønsberg, Norway. Her crew were rescued.

== 19 August ==
List of shipwrecks: 19 August 1821
Ship	State	Description
Hannah	United Kingdom	The ship was driven ashore in the Mississippi River 60 nautical miles (110 km) from New Orleans, Louisiana, United States. She was refloated on 16 September.

== 21 August ==
List of shipwrecks: 21 August 1821
Ship	State	Description
Frederika	Hamburg	The ship departed from Port-au-Prince, Haiti for Hamburg. No further trace, presumed foundered with the loss of all hands.

== 23 August ==
List of shipwrecks: 23 August 1821
Ship	State	Description
Thomas Gilbert	United Kingdom	The ship sprang a leak and foundered in the Atlantic Ocean. Her crew were rescued by Caledonia (United Kingdom). She was on a voyage from the Clyde to Miramichi Bay.

== 26 August ==
List of shipwrecks: 26 August 1821
Ship	State	Description
Alligator	United Kingdom	The brig was captured off Jamaica by a pirate schooner. She was subsequently lost. Alligator was on a voyage from Jamaica to Saint John, New Brunswick, British North America.

== 27 August ==
List of shipwrecks: 27 August 1821
Ship	State	Description
Aurora	United Kingdom	The whaler was lost in the Davis Strait.
Carmarthen Packet	United Kingdom	The ship struck the Runnel Stone and foundered in the Atlantic Ocean off Land's End, Cornwall. Her crew were rescued by Regent (United Kingdom. She was on a voyage from Carmarthen to London.
Dexterity	United Kingdom	The whaler was lost in the Davis Strait.
Hero	United Kingdom	The ship foundered in the Atlantic Ocean 5 leagues (15 nautical miles (28 km)) west north west of St. Ives, Cornwall. All on board were rescued by Hope (United Kingdom). She was on a voyage from Swansea, Glamorgan to Plymouth, Devon.

== 28 August ==
List of shipwrecks: 28 August 1821
Ship	State	Description
Ceres	United Kingdom	The ship was wrecked on "Tanamiere Island", in the South Seas.

== 30 August ==
List of shipwrecks: 30 August 1821
Ship	State	Description
Eliza & James	United Kingdom	The ship was run down and sunk off Flamborough Head, Yorkshire by Good Design (United Kingdom. Her crew were rescued.

== Unknown date ==
List of shipwrecks: Unknown date 1821
Ship	State	Description
Rosalia	Russia	The ship was beached near Reval before 20 August. She was on a voyage from Saint Petersburg to Rouen, Seine-Inférieure, France.
Tentadora	Portugal	The ship was wrecked on the coast of Maranhão, Brazil. Her crew were rescued.
