= List of shipwrecks in February 1827 =

The list of shipwrecks in February 1827 includes some ships sunk, wrecked or otherwise lost during February 1827.

== 6 February ==
List of shipwrecks: 6 February 1827
Ship	State	Description
Independence	United States	The ship was abandoned in the Atlantic Ocean. She was on a voyage from Portland, Maine to Baltimore, Maryland.

== 7 February ==
List of shipwrecks: 7 February 1827
Ship	State	Description
Flora	United Kingdom	The barque sprang a leak in the Atlantic Ocean and was abandoned by her passengers and crew, thirteen in number. They were rescued on 15 February by Alexander (United Kingdom). Flora was on a voyage from Saint John, New Brunswick, British North America to Liverpool, Lancashire.

== 10 February ==
List of shipwrecks: 10 February 1827
Ship	State	Description
Mary	(United Kingdom of Great Britain and Ireland) Bermuda	The ship was wrecked at Bermuda. All on board were rescued. She was on a voyage from Demerara to Bermuda.

== 12 February ==
List of shipwrecks: 12 February 1827
Ship	State	Description
Sea Flower	United Kingdom	The ship was lost off São Miguel, Azores, Portugal. Her crew were rescued. She was on a voyage from Belfast, County Antrim to São Miguel.
William	United Kingdom	The ship was driven ashore and wrecked on São Miguel.

== 15 February ==
List of shipwrecks: 15 February 1827
Ship	State	Description
Marmion	United Kingdom	The ship sprang a leak and was abandoned in the Atlantic Ocean (42°00′N 11°00′W). All on board were rescued by Garland (United Kingdom). She was on a voyage from London to Calcutta, India.

== 16 February ==
List of shipwrecks: 16 February 1827
Ship	State	Description
Duke of Richmond	United Kingdom	The brig departed from Galway for the Clyde. No further trace, presumed foundered with the loss of all hands.

== 17 February ==
List of shipwrecks: 17 February 1827
Ship	State	Description
Betsey	United Kingdom	The ship was driven ashore and wrecked at North Shields, County Durham.
Clyde	United Kingdom	The ship was driven ashore and wrecked at Arbroath, Forfarshire. All on board were rescued by rocket apparatus.

== 19 February ==
List of shipwrecks: 19 February 1827
Ship	State	Description
Leander	United States	The ship was abandoned in the Atlantic Ocean with the loss of some life. Survivors were rescued by Comet (United Kingdom). Leander was on a voyage from Portland, Maine to São Miguel, Azores, Portugal.

== 21 February ==
List of shipwrecks: 21 February 1827
Ship	State	Description
Arab	United Kingdom	The ship sprang a leak in the Atlantic Ocean (49°50′N 12°00′W) and was abandoned. Her crew were rescued by Crown (United Kingdom).
Macduff	United Kingdom	The ship foundered in the North Sea off Sunderland, County Durham. Her crew were rescued. She was on a voyage from Leith, Lothian to Sunderland.

== 22 February ==
List of shipwrecks: 22 February 1827
Ship	State	Description
Apollo	United Kingdom	The ship ran aground off Neuwerk, Hamburg. She was on a voyage from Sunderland, County Durham to Hamburg.
Charlotte	Hamburg	The ship ran aground off Neuwerk. She was on a voyage from Sunderland to Hamburg.
Mercury	United Kingdom	The ship was driven ashore at Tarragona, Spain. She was on a voyage from Tarragona to Rio de Janeiro, Brazil.

== 24 February ==
List of shipwrecks: 24 February 1827
Ship	State	Description
Abeona	United Kingdom	The ship was wrecked near Rønne, Denmark. Her crew were rescued. She was on a voyage from Montrose, Forfarshire to Danzig, Prussia.
Duchess	United Kingdom	The ship foundered in the North Sea between the mouth of the Humber and North Shields, County Durham. Her crew were rescued. She was on a voyage from Stockton-on-Tees, County Durham to King's Lynn, Norfolk.
Isabella	United Kingdom	The ship was lost in the Azores, Portugal. Her crew were rescued. She was on a voyage from Demerara to Liverpool, Lancashire.

== 25 February ==
List of shipwrecks: 25 February 1827
Ship	State	Description
HMS Diamond	Royal Navy	The Leda-class frigate was destroyed by fire and sank at Portsmouth, Hampshire.
Hampshire	United Kingdom	The ship ran aground and sank on the Haisborough Sands. Her crew were rescued.

== 26 February ==
List of shipwrecks: 26 February 1827
Ship	State	Description
Atlantic	United Kingdom	The ship was driven ashore and wrecked in Cardigan Bay. Her crew were rescued. She was on a voyage from Marseille, Bouches-du-Rhône, France to Glasgow, Renfrewshire.
Elizabeth and Hannah	United Kingdom	The brig foundered in the North Sea off Warkworth, Northumberland. Her crew were rescued
Maria	France	The ship was wrecked on the Goodwin Sands, Kent, United Kingdom. Her crew were rescued. She was on a voyage from Marennes, Charente-Maritime to Antwerp, Netherlands.
Sociable Friends	United Kingdom	The ship was wrecked in the Bristol Channel. She was on a voyage from Watchet, Somerset to Bristol, Gloucestershire.
Two Johns	United Kingdom	The ship was driven ashore at Caister-on-Sea, Norfolk. She was on a voyage from London to Leeds, Yorkshire.

== 27 February ==
List of shipwrecks: 27 February 1827
Ship	State	Description
Apollo	United Kingdom	The ship was driven ashore at Liverpool, Lancashire. She was on a voyage from Alicante, Spain to Liverpool.
Comet	United Kingdom	The ship struck a sunken wreck in the North Sea off Happisburgh, Norfolk and foundered. All on board were rescued. She was on a voyage from London to Leith, Lothian.
Speculation	United Kingdom	The ship was driven ashore and wrecked on the south coast of the Isle of Wight. Her crew were rescued. She was on a voyage from Faro, Portugal to London.

== 28 February ==
List of shipwrecks: 28 February 1827
Ship	State	Description
Alice and Amelia	United Kingdom	The ship was driven ashore and wrecked on Cremtyne Point. She was on a voyage from Dublin to Liverpool, Lancashire.
Vrow Johanna	Netherlands	The ship was driven ashore and wrecked at the Birling Gap, Sussex, United Kingdom. Her crew were rescued. She was on a voyage from Bordeaux, Gironde, France to Amsterdam, North Holland.

== Unknown date ==
List of shipwrecks: Unknown date in February 1827
Ship	State	Description
Comet	United Kingdom	The ship foundered in the North Sea off Great Yarmouth, Norfolk.
Champion	United Kingdom	The ship was driven ashore at Barcelona, Spain. She was refloated on 21 February.
Fanny	United Kingdom	The ship foundered in the North Sea off the coast of Lincolnshire in late February.
James	United Kingdom	The ship ran aground and was severely damaged at Havana, Cuba. She was on a voyage from Havana to Cowes, Isle of Wight.
La Desiré	France	The ship was driven ashore and wrecked at Barcelona.
La Jenny	France	The ship was driven ashore and wrecked at Barcelona.
Oak	United Kingdom	The ship was driven ashore and wrecked at Whitby, Yorkshire.
Royal Arch	United States	The ship departed from New York for Gibraltar. No further trace, presumed foundered in the Atlantic Ocean with the loss of all hands.
