= List of shipwrecks in April 1831 =

The list of shipwrecks in April 1831 includes ships sunk, foundered, grounded, or otherwise lost during April 1831.

== 1 April ==
List of shipwrecks: 1 April 1831
Ship	State	Description
Dumfries	United Kingdom	The ship was wrecked on the Loggerhead Shoals, off the coast of Florida, United States. Her crew were rescued. She was on a voyage from Lisbon, Portugal to New Orleans, Louisiana, United States.

== 2 April ==
List of shipwrecks: 2 April 1831
Ship	State	Description
Rapid	United Kingdom	The paddle steamer was destroyed by fire at Kirkcaldy, Fife.

== 8 April ==
List of shipwrecks: 8 April 1831
Ship	State	Description
Maria	United Kingdom	The ship ran aground and sank in the River Tyne.
Neutraliten	Sweden	The ship was in collision with another vessel and sank in the English Channel off Beachy Head, Sussex, United Kingdom with the loss of six of her twelve crew.
Robert Fudge	United Kingdom	The ship was wrecked at Alvarado, Veracruz, Mexico with the loss of two lives.. She was on a voyage from Falmouth, Cornwall to Alvarado.

== 10 April ==
List of shipwrecks: 10 April 1831
Ship	State	Description
Helen	United States	The ship was wrecked at Ocracoke, North Carolina. She was on a voyage from Eastport, California to Saint John, New Brunswick, British North America.

== 12 April ==
List of shipwrecks: 12 April 1831
Ship	State	Description
John	United Kingdom	The ship was wrecked near Cádiz, Spain.
Pomerania	France	The ship ran aground at "Quellebourg".

== 13 April ==
List of shipwrecks: 13 April 1831
Ship	State	Description
HMS Pylades	Royal Navy	The sloop-of-war ran aground and capsized at Roona Point, County Mayo.

== 14 April ==
List of shipwrecks: 14 April 1831
Ship	State	Description
Liberty	United Kingdom	The ship struck a sunken rock and foundered whilst on a voyage from Milford Haven, Pembrokeshire to Bristol, Gloucestershire. Her crew were rescued.

== 15 April ==
List of shipwrecks: 15 April 1831
Ship	State	Description
Therese	United Kingdom	The ship foundered in the North Sea off Great Yarmouth, Norfolk. Her crew were rescued. She was on a voyage from Hull, Yorkshire to Hamburg.

== 18 April ==
List of shipwrecks: 18 April 1831
Ship	State	Description
Romulus	United Kingdom	The ship was wrecked 70 nautical miles (130 km) east of Halifax, Nova Scotia. Her crew were rescued. She was on a voyage from Greenock, Renfrewshire to Halifax.

== 19 April ==
List of shipwrecks: 19 April 1831
Ship	State	Description
Brailsford	United Kingdom	The ship struck on Langley Island as Brailsford was sailing from Plymouth to Quebec. Her crew abandoned her on 24 April after securing her sails and rigging. However, a gale sprang up and afterwards the wreck had disappeared; it was believed that she had sunk.

== 21 April ==
List of shipwrecks: 21 April 1831
Ship	State	Description
Castro Primeiro	Portugal	The ship was wrecked at Porto.
Swallow	United Kingdom	The ship was driven ashore at Great Yarmouth, Norfolk. Her crew were rescued. She was on a voyage from Great Yarmouth to Hull, Yorkshire. Swallow was refloated on 9 May and taken in to Great Yarmouth for repairs.

== 22 April ==
List of shipwrecks: 22 April 1831
Ship	State	Description
Carlisle	United Kingdom	The ship was driven ashore at Sunderland, County Durham. Her crew were rescued. She was refloated on 26 April.
Dauntless	United Kingdom	The ship ran aground on the Haisborough Sands, in the North Sea off the coast of Norfolk, and sank. Her crew were rescued. She was on a voyage from Sunderland, County Durham to a Dutch port.

== 25 April ==
List of shipwrecks: 25 April 1831
Ship	State	Description
Bee	United Kingdom	The ship ran aground on Scroby Sands and was abandoned by her crew.
Lord Nelson	United Kingdom	The ship ran aground on Scroby Sands and sank. Her crew were rescued.

== 30 April ==
List of shipwrecks: 30 April 1831
Ship	State	Description
Coquette	United Kingdom	The schooner was wrecked at Terceira, Azores, Portugal.
Juno	United Kingdom	The ship ran aground on the English Stones, in the River Severn and was consequently beached at Slimeroad Bay. She was on a voyage from Livorno, Grand Duchy of Tuscany to Gloucester. She was taken in to Gloucester on 11 May for repairs.

== Unknown date ==
List of shipwrecks: Unknown date 1831
Ship	State	Description
Caribbean	(United Kingdom of Great Britain and Ireland) New South Wales	The cutter was wrecked off Port Stephens. Her crew were rescued.
Jonge Arie	Netherlands	The ship capsized in the Tagus with the loss of three of her crew.
Mirables	United Kingdom	The ship was wrecked at "Skenoer", Sweden before 26 April. She was on a voyage from Pillau, Prussia to Newcastle upon Tyne, Northumberland.
Rockingham	United Kingdom	The ship sank at Garden Island, Swan River Colony.
Rover	(United Kingdom of Great Britain and Ireland) New South Wales	The cutter foundered whilst on a voyage from Sydney to Newcastle.
Waterloo	(United Kingdom of Great Britain and Ireland) British North America	The steamboat was sunk by ice in the St. Lawrence River. All on board survived. She was on a voyage between Montreal and Quebec City, Lower Canada.
