= List of shipwrecks in 1858 =

The list of shipwrecks in 1858 includes ships sunk, wrecked, foundered, grounded, or otherwise lost during 1858.

table of contents
1858
Jan	Feb	Mar	Apr
May	Jun	Jul	Aug
Sep	Oct	Nov	Dec
Unknown date

== Unknown date ==
List of shipwrecks: Unknown date 1858
Ship	State	Description
Boree	United Kingdom	The ship was driven ashore at Sfax, Beylik of Tunis. She was on a voyage from Alexandria, Egypt to Liverpool, Lancashire. She was refloated, repaired and resumed her voyage some time later.
Carrier	United States	The 345-ton sidewheel paddle steamer struck a snag and sank in the Missouri River. She was refloated, repaired, and returned to service.
Catherine	United Kingdom	The ship foundered off Ningpo, China. Her crew were rescued. She was on a voyage from Hong Kong to Shanghai.
Cyclops	Unknown	During a voyage from San Francisco, California, to Coquille, Oregon, the schooner was wrecked on the Coos Bay Bar in Coos Bay off the coast of Oregon either in 1858 or in the spring of 1862.
Dona Franziska	Hamburg	The brig was wrecked on the coast of Brazil between 24 July and 6 November with the loss of three lives.
Elizabeth	France	The whaler was wrecked in the Chatham Islands before 10 April. Her crew were rescued.
General Kushion	United States	The ship was destroyed by fire at San Francisco, California.
Genevieve	United Kingdom	The barque was wrecked on Matakong, Africa.
Hope	United Kingdom	The ship was wrecked on the Parague Flat. Her crew were rescued. She was on a voyage from Melbourne, Victoria to Rangoon, Burma.
Jane Black	United Kingdom	The ship departed from Limerick for Quebec City, Province of Canada, British North America in mid-July. Presumed to have foundered on the return voyage with the loss of all hands.
John E. Mayer	United States	The ship was destroyed by fire in the Gulf of California.
John Franklin	United States	The schooner was lost while coming from Prince Edward Island for Gloucester, Massachusetts in the winter of 1858—59. Lost with all 6 hands, plus passengers, up to 14 lives lost.
Kamchadal (Камчадал)	Imperial Russian Navy	The ship was wrecked near ru:Cape Puir in the Amur Estuary between 11 October and the end of November with the loss of all 14 people on board. She was on a voyage from Nikolayevsk-on-Amur to ru:Udskoye on the Uda.
Lucas	(United Kingdom of Great Britain and Ireland) Victoria	The ship was wrecked with the loss of fifteen lives. She was on a voyage from Victoria to Fraser Island, New South Wales.
Maria Isabel	Peru	The steamship was lost in the Straits of Magellan. Her crew were rescued.
Mary	United States	The clipper ran aground in the Bahamas. She was refloated.
Neophyte	United Kingdom	The brigantine was wrecked on a reef off Sierra Leone in late July or early August. She was on a voyage from Sierra Leone to Liverpool, Lancashire.
Panama	(United Kingdom of Great Britain and Ireland) New Zealand	The brig went missing while en route between the Chatham Islands and the New Zealand mainland early in 1858. Some wreckage believed to have been from the Panama was washed ashore near Cape Kidnappers in early September.
Queen of Clippers	United States	The fishing schooner was lost in the Newfoundland fishery in the winter of 1858—59. Lost with all 6 hands.
