= List of shipwrecks in May 1829 =

The list of shipwrecks in May 1829 includes some ships sunk, wrecked or otherwise lost during May 1829.

== 1 May ==
List of shipwrecks: 1 May 1829
Ship	State	Description
Flora	Prussia	The ship was driven ashore and wrecked at Memel with the loss of eleven lives.
Governor Arthur	(United Kingdom of Great Britain and Ireland) New South Wales	The ship was wrecked at Nobbys Island. All on board were rescued.
Henriette Auguste	Prussia	The ship was driven ashore and wrecked at Memel.
Nautilus	United Kingdom	The ship was driven ashore and wrecked at Memel. Her crew were rescued.
Ploughman	United Kingdom	The ship was driven ashore and wrecked at Memel. Her crew were rescued.

== 3 May ==
List of shipwrecks: 3 May 1829
Ship	State	Description
Eleanor	United Kingdom	The ship ran aground in the North Sea off South Shields, County Durham and capsized.

== 6 May ==
List of shipwrecks: 6 May 1829
Ship	State	Description
Comet	United Kingdom	The brig was wrecked in the Torres Strait. Her crew survived and was rescued by Fairfield three days later.

== 7 May ==
List of shipwrecks: 7 May 1829
Ship	State	Description
Dispatch	(United Kingdom of Great Britain and Ireland) Tobago	The ship was wrecked at Tobago.
Elizabeth	United Kingdom	The ship foundered in the Irish Sea. Her crew were rescued by Dee (United Kingdom). She was on a voyage from Youghal, County Cork to Cardiff, Glamorgan.

== 8 May ==
List of shipwrecks: 8 May 1829
Ship	State	Description
Batchelor	(United Kingdom of Great Britain and Ireland) Guernsey	The ship ran aground near Cape Spartel, Morocco and was wrecked. She was on a voyage from Rio de Janeiro, Brazil to Trieste.
Splendid	United States	The ship was driven ashore and wrecked at Gibraltar.

== 10 May ==
List of shipwrecks: 10 May 1829
Ship	State	Description
Clyde	United Kingdom	The ship was lost in the Magdalen Islands, British North America. She was on a voyage from Belfast, county Antrim to Miramichi, New Brunswick, British North America.

== 11 May ==
List of shipwrecks: 11 May 1829
Ship	State	Description
Theodosia	United Kingdom	The ship foundered in the Irish Sea off The Smalls Lighthouse. Her crew were rescued by Waterloo (United Kingdom).

== 13 May ==
List of shipwrecks: 13 May 1829
Ship	State	Description
John	United Kingdom	The ship sank at Reval, Russia.
Joseph	United Kingdom	The ship was wrecked on Bird Island. Her crew were rescued. She was on a voyage from Liverpool, Lancashire to Quebec City, Lower Canada, British North America.

== 16 May ==
List of shipwrecks: 16 May 1829
Ship	State	Description
Argo	United Kingdom	The ship was driven ashore and wrecked in Boston Bay, Jamaica. Her crew were rescued.
Jane	United Kingdom	The brigantine was sighted off Bermuda whilst on a voyage from Port-au-Prince, Haiti to Aberdeen. No further trace, presumed subsequently foundered with the loss of all hands.

== 18 May ==
List of shipwrecks: 18 May 1829
Ship	State	Description
Governor Ready	United Kingdom	Governor Ready. The ship was lost in the Torres Strait. The crew travelled in smaller boats until rescued by the Amity (flag unknown) on June 2.

== 21 May ==
List of shipwrecks: 21 May 1829
Ship	State	Description
Ann	United Kingdom	The schooner capsized off "Winga" with the loss of one of her six crew. Survivors were rescued by St. Andrew (United Kingdom). Ann was on a voyage from Kiel, Duchy of Holstein to Leith, Lothian.
Glory	United Kingdom	The ship was wrecked at Saint Lucia.

== 22 May ==
List of shipwrecks: 22 May 1829
Ship	State	Description
Pomoshchny (Помощный, 'Helpful')	Imperial Russian Navy	The frigate ran aground 5 nautical miles (9.3 km) east to northeast of the Osmussaar Lighthouse. Her crew survived. She was on a voyage from Kronstadt to Sveaborg, Grand Duchy of Finland. Helpful subsequently broke up.
John and Jane	United Kingdom	The ship was wrecked near Marsden, County Durham.

== 25 May ==
List of shipwrecks: 25 May 1829
Ship	State	Description
Janet	United Kingdom	The ship foundered in the North Sea off Cromer, Norfolk. Her crew were rescued.

== 27 May ==
List of shipwrecks: 27 May 1829
Ship	State	Description
Nelly	United Kingdom	The ship foundered in the North Sea off Great Yarmouth, Norfolk. Her crew were rescued.

== 31 May ==
List of shipwrecks: 31 May 1829
Ship	State	Description
Emulus	United Kingdom	The ship ran aground on the Haisborough Sands, in the North Sea off the coast of Norfolk and foundered. Her crew were rescued.
Oscar	United Kingdom	The ship was wrecked 10 nautical miles (19 km) south of Cape Rouse (21°45′N 59°40′E). She was on a voyage from Bombay to Bushehr, Iran.

== Unknown date ==
List of shipwrecks: Unknown date in May 1829
Ship	State	Description
Adolphine	France	The galiot was wrecked near Deal, Kent, United Kingdom. She was on a voyage from Malmö, Sweden to Havre de Grâce, Seine-Inférieure.
Betsey	United Kingdom	The schooner foundered in the North Sea off Great Yarmouth, Norfolk with the loss of all six crew.
Charlotte	United Kingdom	The ship was wrecked on the west coast of Grand Manan Island, New Brunswick, British North America.
Cuba Packet	(United Kingdom of Great Britain and Ireland) Jamaica	The schooner was wrecked on a reef off the mouth of the Bannada River. Her crew were rescued.
James Lucas	(United Kingdom of Great Britain and Ireland) New South Wales	The schooner-rigged lighter was wrecked on Bruny Island, Van Diemen's Land. She was on a voyage from Maquarie Harbour to Hobart, Van Diemen's Land.
Legatus	United Kingdom	The ship was driven ashore and wrecked in Chaleur Bay, Lower Canada, British North America before 23 May.
Thetis	United Kingdom	The ship was lost on Cape Breton Island, Nova Scotia, British North America before 9 May. She was on a voyage from the Clyde to Pictou, Nova Scotia.
