= List of shipwrecks in June 1821 =

The list of shipwrecks in June 1821 includes ships sunk, wrecked, or otherwise lost during June 1821.

== 2 June ==
List of shipwrecks: 2 June 1821
| Ship | State | Description |
|---|---|---|
| Flying Fish | United Kingdom | The ship was driven ashore and wrecked at Padstow, Cornwall. |

== 7 June ==
List of shipwrecks: 7 June 1821
| Ship | State | Description |
|---|---|---|
| Jane | United Kingdom | The ship's crew mutinied and murdered two of the crew. She was scuttled off Stornoway, Outer Hebrides. Jane was on a voyage from Gibraltar to Bahia, Brazil. |
| Thomas | United Kingdom | The transport ship was wrecked on the Stoney Binks, in the North Sea off the mouth of the Humber with the loss of one life. Survivors were rescued by a lifeboat. |

== 8 June ==
List of shipwrecks: 8 June 1821
| Ship | State | Description |
|---|---|---|
| Blenden Hall | United Kingdom | The ship was sighted off the Cape Verde Islands whilst on a voyage from London to Bombay, India. No further trace, presumed foundered with the loss of all hands. |

== 9 June ==
List of shipwrecks: 9 June 1821
| Ship | State | Description |
|---|---|---|
| Margaretta Catharina | Denmark | The ship was wrecked near Aalborg. She was on a voyage from Memel, Prussia to Copenhagen. |
| Neptune | United Kingdom | The sloop was driven ashore at "Hummersly", Yorkshire. |
| Perseverance | United States | The brig was driven ashore and wrecked in the Abaco Islands. Her crew were rescued. She was on a voyage from Charleston, South Carolina to Havana, Cuba. |
| Speculator | United Kingdom | The ship was driven ashore and wrecked at "Hummersly", Yorkshire. |
| Yarm | United Kingdom | The ship was driven ashore and wrecked at "Hummersly", Yorkshire. |

== 10 June ==
List of shipwrecks: 10 June 1821
| Ship | State | Description |
|---|---|---|
| Eendracht | Netherlands | The ship was wrecked on the coast of Pomerania, Prussia. She was on a voyage from Danzig to Amsterdam, North Holland. |
| Johanna | United Kingdom | The brig was severely damaged by fire in the English Channel. She was taken in to Portsmouth, Hampshire. |

== 12 June ==
List of shipwrecks: 12 June 1821
| Ship | State | Description |
|---|---|---|
| Hope | Norway | The schooner ran aground on the Goodwin Sands, Kent, United Kingdom. Her crew were rescued. She was refloated on 14 June and taken in to Deal, Kent. Hope was on a voyage from Molde to L'Orient, Morbihan, France. |
| Hope | (United Kingdom of Great Britain and Ireland) Guernsey | The ship capsized and sank whilst at anchor at Alicante, Spain. She was later refloated. |
| Jason | United Kingdom | Lloyd's List reported the ship had been driven ashore on the South Breakers of St. Simon's Bar off St. Simons, Georgia, United States, where she had bilged. She had been on a voyage from Falmouth, Cornwall, England, to Savannah, Georgia. |

== 17 June ==
List of shipwrecks: 17 June 1821
| Ship | State | Description |
|---|---|---|
| Pallas | United States | The ship was lost at Bermuda. |

== 18 June ==
List of shipwrecks: 18 June 1821
| Ship | State | Description |
|---|---|---|
| Twee Gebroeders | Netherlands | The ship was lost off Ameland, Friesland. |
| Ysselstroom | Netherlands | The ship was wrecked in the Vlie. Her crew were rescued. She was on a voyage from Newcastle upon Tyne, Northumberland, United Kingdom to Zwolle, Overijssel. |

== 27 June ==
List of shipwrecks: 27 June 1821
| Ship | State | Description |
|---|---|---|
| Philip and Emelie | Hamburg | The brig was wrecked on the Belfast Reef, off the north coast of Antigua. She was on a voyage from Hamburg to St. Thomas, Virgin Islands and Havana, Cuba. |
| Union Island | United Kingdom | The ship struck a rock and sank in the Dure River, Africa with the loss of three of her crew. |

== 28 June ==
List of shipwrecks: 28 June 1821
| Ship | State | Description |
|---|---|---|
| Eclipse | United Kingdom | The ship was lost on the Sand Heads. Her crew were rescued. She was on a voyage from Bengal, India to the Cape of Good Hope and London. |

== Unknown date ==
List of shipwrecks: Unknown date 1821
| Ship | State | Description |
|---|---|---|
| Princess of Wales | United Kingdom | The whaler departed from The Downs for the South Seas. No further trace, presumed foundered with the loss of all hands. |
| Royal Desiré | France | The ship was lost off the coast of East Florida before 14 June. Her crew were rescued. She was on a voyage from Havana, Cuba to Havre de Grâce, Seine-Inférieure. |
| Thomas | United Kingdom | The ship ran aground at Quaco, New Brunswick, British North America before 21 June. |
