= List of shipwrecks in July 1828 =

The list of shipwrecks in July 1828 includes all ships sunk, foundered, grounded, or otherwise lost during July 1828.

== 2 July ==
List of shipwrecks: 2 July 1828
Ship	State	Description
Maria	(United Kingdom of Great Britain and Ireland) British North America	The ship was wrecked on Prince Edward Island. She was on a voyage from Quebec City, Lower Canada to Pugwash, Nova Scotia.

== 9 July ==
List of shipwrecks: 9 July 1828
Ship	State	Description
Fair Trader	United Kingdom	The ship foundered in the North Sea off the mouth of the Humber. Her crew were rescued by Fox (United Kingdom).

== 10 July ==
List of shipwrecks: 10 July 1828
Ship	State	Description
Despatch	United Kingdom	The brig ran aground off the Isle aux Morts, Newfoundland, British North America with the loss of 51 of the 211 people on board. She was on a voyage from Londonderry to Quebec City, Lower Canada, British North America.

== 13 July ==
List of shipwrecks: 13 July 1828
Ship	State	Description
Barnsley	United Kingdom	The ship foundered in the North Sea off Cromer, Norfolk.
Diligence	United Kingdom	The ship foundered in the North Sea. Her crew were rescued by Enterprise (United Kingdom).
Nettle	United Kingdom	The ship foundered in the North Sea. Her crew were rescued. She was on a voyage from Sunderland, County Durham to Great Yarmouth, Norfolk.

== 14 July ==
List of shipwrecks: 14 July 1828
Ship	State	Description
Martha	United Kingdom	The brig was wrecked on the Haisborough Sands, in the North Sea off the coast of Norfolk. Her crew survived.

== 16 July ==
List of shipwrecks: 16 July 1828
Ship	State	Description
Emily	United Kingdom	The whaler, a brig, capsized in a squall in the Atlantic Ocean (29°39′N 79°00′W). Her fourteen crew were rescued by a British brig. She was on a voyage from New Bedford, Massachusetts to the South Seas.
Rose	United Kingdom	The ship sprang a leak and foundered in the Atlantic Ocean off Cape St. Vincent, Portugal. Her crew survived. She was on a voyage from Adra, Spain to London.

== 18 July ==
List of shipwrecks: 18 July 1828
Ship	State	Description
Velocity	France	The ship departed from Bordeaux, Gironde for New Orleans, Louisiana, United States. No further trace, presumed foundered with the loss of all hands.

== 19 July ==
List of shipwrecks: 19 July 1828
Ship	State	Description
Robert	United Kingdom	The ship departed from the Clyde for Demerara. No further trace, presumed foundered with the loss of all hands.

== 22 July ==
List of shipwrecks: 22 July 1828
Ship	State	Description
Little Family	United Kingdom	The schooner was wrecked on the Newcombe Sand, in the North Sea off Great Yarmouth, Norfolk. Her crew were rescued. She was on a voyage from Sunderland, County Durham to Exeter, Devon.

== 30 July ==
List of shipwrecks: 30 July 1828
Ship	State	Description
Skelton	United Kingdom	The ship was sailing from Trinidad to London when she struck a rock 13' under water, some 10 miles west of Anguila. Although she foundered, her crew was saved. They arrived at Tortola in a boat.

== Unknown date ==
List of shipwrecks: Unknown date in July 1828
Ship	State	Description
Defensor de Pedro	Argentina	The brig was wrecked near Cádiz, Spain.
Dolphin	United Kingdom	The ship foundered in the Irish Sea 12 nautical miles (22 km) off Strangford, County Down. Her crew were rescued. She was on a voyage from Bangor, Caernarfonshire to Belfast, County Down.
Teignmouth	India	The ship was wrecked in the Gulf of California. Her crew were rescued. She was on a voyage from Mazatlan to the Sandwich Islands.
Zephyr	United Kingdom	The ship foundered in the North Sea off the coast of Norway. Her crew were rescued. She was on a voyage from London to Memel, Prussia.
