= List of shipwrecks in July 1830 =

The list of shipwrecks in July 1830 includes ships sunk, foundered, grounded, or otherwise lost during July 1830.

== 2 July ==
List of shipwrecks: 2 July 1830
Ship	State	Description
William	United Kingdom	The whaler was lost in the Davis Strait.

== 3 July ==
List of shipwrecks: 3 July 1830
Ship	State	Description
Alexander	United Kingdom	The whaler was lost in the Davis Strait. Her crew were rescued.
Hope	United Kingdom	The whaler was lost in the Davis Strait. Her crew were rescued.
Liberty	United Kingdom	The ship was wrecked of a reef off Dunbar, Lothian. She was on a voyage from Rotterdam, South Holland, Netherlands to Leith, Lothian.
Middleton	United Kingdom	The whaler was lost in the Davis Strait. Her crew were rescued.

== 4 July ==
List of shipwrecks: 4 July 1830
Ship	State	Description
Commerce	United Kingdom	The ship was wrecked on Cape Breton Island, British North America with the loss of a crew member.

== 5 July ==
List of shipwrecks: 5 July 1830
Ship	State	Description
Neptune	United Kingdom	The ship was wrecked near Whitehaven, Cumberland with the loss of two lives. She was on a voyage from Dumfries to Maryport, Cumberland.

== 8 July ==
List of shipwrecks: 8 July 1830
Ship	State	Description
Mary Ann	United Kingdom	The ship foundered in the Bay of Fundy.

== 9 July ==
List of shipwrecks: 9 July 1830
Ship	State	Description
George III	United Kingdom	The ship was driven ashore at Gravesend, Kent.
Ringdove	United Kingdom	The ship was driven ashore at Chatham, Kent.
Triton	United Kingdom	The ship was driven ashore and wrecked at Gaspé, Lower Canada, British North America with the loss of about twenty lives.

== 10 July ==
List of shipwrecks: 10 July 1830
Ship	State	Description
Lady Coote	United Kingdom	The ship was wrecked on the Gunfleet Sand, in the North Sea off the coast of Essex. Her crew were rescued. She was on a voyage from Stockton-on-Tees, County Durham to Sheerness, Kent.

== 11 July ==
List of shipwrecks: 11 July 1830
Ship	State	Description
Charlotte	United Kingdom	The ship departed from Port-au-Prince, Haiti for Cowes, Isle of Wight. No further trace, presumed foundered with the loss of all hands.

== 13 July ==
List of shipwrecks: 13 July 1830
Ship	State	Description
James	United Kingdom	The ship was lost off Newfoundland, British North America. She was on a voyage from Charlottetown, Prince Edward Island, British North America to Plymouth, Devon.

== 14 July ==
List of shipwrecks: 14 July 1830
Ship	State	Description
Friendship	United Kingdom	The ship capsized in the Atlantic Ocean with the loss of one of her ten crew. The survivors were rescued on 1 August by Thomas (United Kingdom). Friendship was on a voyage from Richibucto, New Brunswick, British North America to Ulverston, Lancashire.
Julia and Maria	United Kingdom	The ship was wrecked off Seal Island, Nova Scotia, British North America. Her crew were rescued. She was on a voyage from Philadelphia, Pennsylvania, United States to Halifax, Nova Scotia.

== 18 July ==
List of shipwrecks: 18 July 1830
Ship	State	Description
Friends	United Kingdom	The ship foundered off Newfoundland, British North America. She was on a voyage from Pictou, Nova Scotia, British North America to Liverpool, Lancashire.

== 19 July ==
List of shipwrecks: 19 July 1830
Ship	State	Description
Crown	United Kingdom	The ship was driven ashore at Brook, Isle of Wight.

== 21 July ==
List of shipwrecks: 21 July 1830
Ship	State	Description
Carbonbear	United Kingdom	The ship was driven ashore and severely damaged in the River Thames at Blackwall, London.

== 23 July ==
List of shipwrecks: 23 July 1830
Ship	State	Description
Amity	United Kingdom	The ship departed from Laguna, Santa Catarina, Brazil for Cork. No further trace, presumed foundered with the loss of all hands.

== 24 July ==
List of shipwrecks: 24 July 1830
Ship	State	Description
Euphémie	France	The ship was wrecked on Lintin Island, China with the loss of a crew member. She was on a voyage from Singapore to Lintin Island.

== 25 July ==
List of shipwrecks: 25 July 1830
Ship	State	Description
Good Intent	United Kingdom	The sloop was run down and sunk in St. Andrew's Bay. Her crew survived.

== 29 July ==
List of shipwrecks: 29 July 1830
Ship	State	Description
Eliza	United Kingdom	The ship departed from Penzance, Cornwall for Cork. No further trace, presumed foundered with the loss of all hands.

== 30 July ==
List of shipwrecks: 30 July 1830
Ship	State	Description
Friendship	United Kingdom	The ship capsized in the Atlantic Ocean. 300 nautical miles (560 km) west of Cape Clear Island, County Cork Her crew were rescued the next day by Thomas Tyson. Friendship was on a voyage from Richibucto, New Brunswick, British North America to Ulverston, Lancashire.

== Unknown date ==
List of shipwrecks: Unknown date 1830
Ship	State	Description
Hero	United Kingdom	The ship foundered before 10 July. Her crew were rescued. She was on a voyage from Sunderland, County Durham to Quebec City, Lower Canada, British North America.
Moon	United Kingdom	The ship was abandoned in the Atlantic Ocean before 12 July. Her crew were rescued by Eliza and Jane (United Kingdom).
Nelson	United Kingdom	The ship was abandoned in the Atlantic Ocean (49°46′N 32°30′W) before 10 July with some loss of life.
Unity	United Kingdom	The ship foundered in the Atlantic Ocean. Her crew survived. She was on a voyage from Lisbon, Portugal to Newfoundland, British North America.
