= List of shipwrecks in July 1822 =

The list of shipwrecks in July 1822 includes some ships sunk, foundered, grounded, or otherwise lost during July 1822.

== 1 July ==
List of shipwrecks: 1 July 1822
Ship	State	Description
Industry	United Kingdom	The sloop was driven onto the Burbo Sandbank, in Liverpool Bay. Her crew were rescued.
Venus	United Kingdom	The ship sprang a leak and foundered in the Bristol Channel off Lundy Island, Devon. Her crew were rescued. She was on a voyage from Cardiff, Glamorgan to Hayle, Cornwall.

== 3 July ==
List of shipwrecks: 3 July 1822
Ship	State	Description
Titus	France	The ship was driven ashore and broke her back in the Gironde. She was on a voyage from Bengal, India to Bordeaux, Gironde. Titus was later refloated and taken in to Bordeaux.

== 6 July ==
List of shipwrecks: 6 July 1822
Ship	State	Description
Shamrock	United States	The ship was driven ashore at Aveiro, Portugal.

== 8 July ==
List of shipwrecks: 8 July 1822
Ship	State	Description
Don Juan	United Kingdom	The 24-foot (7.3-metre) open boat sank in a storm in the Ligurian Sea 10 nautical miles (19 km; 12 mi) off the coast of the Grand Duchy of Tuscany during a voyage from Livorno (Leghorn) to Lerici. All three people on board — the English writer and poet Percy Bysshe Shelley, the retired British Army officer Edward Ellerker Williams, and their boatman — drowned.

== 9 July ==
List of shipwrecks: 9 July 1822
Ship	State	Description
Catherine	United Kingdom	The ship ran aground in the Rock Channel. She was on a voyage from Cork to Liverpool, Lancashire.
Hero	United States	The brig was driven ashore and wrecked on Corn Island, Massachusetts.
Sampson	United States	The brig was driven ashore and wrecked on Corn Island.

== 10 July ==
List of shipwrecks: 10 July 1822
Ship	State	Description
Antelope	United Kingdom	The ship was driven ashore in Table Bay. She was refloated on 15 July. Antelope was on a voyage from the Cape of Good Hope to the "River Kysna".
Hector	Sweden	The ship was driven ashore at Thurso, Caithness, United Kingdom. She was on a voyage from Stockholm to Providence, Rhode Island, United States. Hector was refloated in late July.
Sarah	United Kingdom	The ship was driven ashore and wrecked at the Cape of Good Hope. She was on a voyage from Bombay, India to London.

== 11 July ==
List of shipwrecks: 11 July 1822
Ship	State	Description
Memel	Prussia	The ship was wrecked on Skagen, Denmark. Her crew were rescued.

== 12 July ==
List of shipwrecks: 12 July 1822
Ship	State	Description
Eliza	United Kingdom	The ship was wrecked on the Haisborough Sands, in the North Sea off the coast of Norfolk with the loss of all hands.
St. Antoine de Padua	Netherlands	The galiot foundered in the Atlantic Ocean (49°09′N 5°30′W). Her crew were rescued by Mary (United Kingdom). She was on a voyage from Rochefort, Charente-Maritime, France to Ghent.

== 13 July ==
List of shipwrecks: 13 July 1822
Ship	State	Description
Jane	United States	The schooner was wrecked near Castle Island, Bermuda. She was on a voyage from Boston, Massachusetts to Havana, Cuba.
Niagara	United States	The ship was driven ashore on the Hoyle Bank, in Liverpool Bay. All on board were rescued. She was on a voyage from Liverpool, Lancashire, United Kingdom to New York. Niagara was later refloated and taken in to Liverpool.
Washington	United States	The ship was wrecked in the Abaco Islands. She was on a voyage from New York to New Orleans, Louisiana.

== 14 July ==
List of shipwrecks: 14 July 1822
Ship	State	Description
Adriana Gereerda	Netherlands	The ship struck a sunken wreck and foundered. Her crew survived. She was on a voyage from Newcastle upon Tyne, Northumberland, United Kingdom to Bruges.

== 15 July ==
List of shipwrecks: 15 July 1822
Ship	State	Description
Lady Sherbrooke	(United Kingdom of Great Britain and Ireland) British North America	The schooner foundered in the Atlantic Ocean. Her crew were rescued by William (United Kingdom). She was on a voyage from Lisbon, Portugal to Newfoundland.

== 16 July ==
List of shipwrecks: 16 July 1822
Ship	State	Description
Spence	United Kingdom	The brig was wrecked near St. Shott's, Newfoundland, British North America. Her crew were rescued. She was on a voyage from Miramichi Bay to Liverpool, Lancashire.

== 17 July ==
List of shipwrecks: 17 July 1822
Ship	State	Description
Eliza	United Kingdom	The whaler was lost in the Davis Straits.
Invincible	United Kingdom	The whaler was lost in the Davis Straits.
Valiant	United Kingdom	The whaler was lost in the Davis Straits.

== 19 July ==
List of shipwrecks: 19 July 1822
Ship	State	Description
Tennessee	United States	The ship was lost in the River Plate. She was on a voyage from Philadelphia, Pennsylvania to Montevideo, Brazil.

== 20 July ==
List of shipwrecks: 20 July 1822
Ship	State	Description
Adriatic	United Kingdom	The brig was driven ashore at the Cape of Good Hope, Cape Colony with the loss of a crew member. She was consequently condemned.
Good Intent	(United Kingdom of Great Britain and Ireland) Cape Colony	The schooner was driven ashore at the Cape of Good Hope.
Lavinia	United Kingdom	The ship was driven ashore at the Cape of Good Hope. She was consequently condemned.
Leander	United Kingdom	The ship was driven ashore at the Cape of Good Hope with the loss of her master and one of her crew. She was subsequently condemned.
Royal George	United Kingdom	The ship was driven ashore at the Cape of Good Hope. She was on a voyage from Van Diemen's Land to London. Royal George was refloated on 20 August.
Sally	United Kingdom	The brig was wrecked at Sidmouth, Devon. Her crew were rescued.
Sun	United Kingdom	The ship was driven ashore at the Cape of Good Hope. She was consequently condemned.
Virginia	United States	The brig was lost on the Îles des Saintes. All on board were rescued by Impatience (France). She was on a voyage from Barbados to Antigua.

== 21 July ==
List of shipwrecks: 21 July 1822
Ship	State	Description
Active	United Kingdom	The ship struck a sandbank and sank in the River Tay with the loss of all three crew.
Adriatic	United Kingdom	The brig was driven ashore at Cape Town.
Goodintent	United Kingdom	The schooner was driven ashore at the Cape of Good Hope.
Lady Hamilton	United Kingdom	The ship was driven ashore at Portishead, Somerset. She was on a voyage from Newfoundland, British North America to Bristol, Gloucestershire. Lady Hamilton was later refloated and taken in to Pill, Somerset.
Lavinia	United Kingdom	The brig was driven ashore at Cape Colony with the los of a crew member.
Leander	United Kingdom	The brig was driven ashore at Cape Town.
Olive Branch	United Kingdom	The brig was driven ashore at Cape Town. Her cargo was unloaded and she was condemned.
Sun	United Kingdom	The brig was driven ashore at Cape Colony.

== 22 July ==
List of shipwrecks: 22 July 1822
Ship	State	Description
General Hamilton	United Kingdom	The ship was driven ashore at Étaples, Pas-de-Calais, France. Her crew were rescued. She was on a voyage from Gibraltar to Saint Petersburg, Russia.

== 25 July ==
List of shipwrecks: 25 July 1822
Ship	State	Description
Behaarlichkeit	Danzig	The ship was driven ashore near Wick, Caithness, United Kingdom. Her crew were rescued. She was on a voyage from Danzig to Liverpool, Lancashire, United Kingdom. Behaarlichkeit was wrecked on 8 October.
Brothers	United Kingdom	The ship was driven ashore at Leigh-on-Sea, Essex. She was on a voyage from Newfoundland, British North America to London. Brothers was refloated on 27 July and taken in to the River Thames.
Liverpool	United Kingdom	The ship was in collision with an iceberg in the Atlantic Ocean (43°50′N 48°00′W) and sank. All 36 people on board survived. She was on a voyage from New York, United States to Liverpool.
Nottingham	United Kingdom	The ship was driven ashore and wrecked near Hesselø, Denmark. She was on a voyage from London to Riga, Russia.
Providence	United Kingdom	The ship foundered in The Wash off King's Lynn, Norfolk. Her crew were rescued by Trebley (United Kingdom).
Queen Charlotte	United Kingdom	The ship was destroyed by fire at Buenos Aires, Argentina.

== 26 July ==
List of shipwrecks: 26 July 1822
Ship	State	Description
Herring	United Kingdom	The ship was wrecked on Shaggy Rock, in St. Mary's Bay, Newfoundland, British North America. Her crew survived. She was on a voyage from Quebec City, Lower Canada, British North America to Greenock, Renfrewshire.
Providence	United Kingdom	The ship foundered in The Wash off King's Lynn, Norfolk Her crew were rescued by Trebley(United Kingdom).

== 27 July ==
List of shipwrecks: 27 July 1822
Ship	State	Description
Calypso	United Kingdom	The whaler was lost in the Davis Straits. her crew were rescued.
Warden	United Kingdom	The ship was wrecked near Tynemouth, Northumberland. Her crew were rescued. She was on a voyage from South Shields, County Durham to a Scottish port.

== 30 July ==
List of shipwrecks: 30 July 1822
Ship	State	Description
Vrow Gerarda	Netherlands	The ship departed from Surinam for Antwerp. No further trace, presumed foundered with the loss of all hands.

== 31 July ==
List of shipwrecks: 31 July 1822
Ship	State	Description
Richmond	United Kingdom	The ship was wrecked on a coral reef off "Hog Island", in the Java Sea. Almorah United Kingdom rescued the crew and took them to Batavia. Richmond was on a voyage from Port Jackson, New South Wales to Batavia, Netherlands East Indies.

== Unknown date ==
List of shipwrecks: Unknown date in July 1822
Ship	State	Description
Antelope	United Kingdom	The ship was driven ashore at the Cape of Good Hope. She was refloated some months later.
Drie Gebroeders	Netherlands	The ship was lost near Stralsund, Norway. Her crew were rescued. She was on a voyage from Königsburg, Prussia to Amsterdam, North Holland.
John and Mary	United Kingdom	The ship was wrecked in Bonne Bay before 19 July. She was on a voyage from Liverpool, Lancashire to Labrador, British North America
Sophia Sarah	United Kingdom	The ship was wrecked on the Anegada Shoal, Virgin Islands. Her crew were rescued. She was on a voyage from Halifax, Nova Scotia, British North America to Jamaica.
