= ASN Hotel Building =

Heritage-listed building in Sydney, Australia

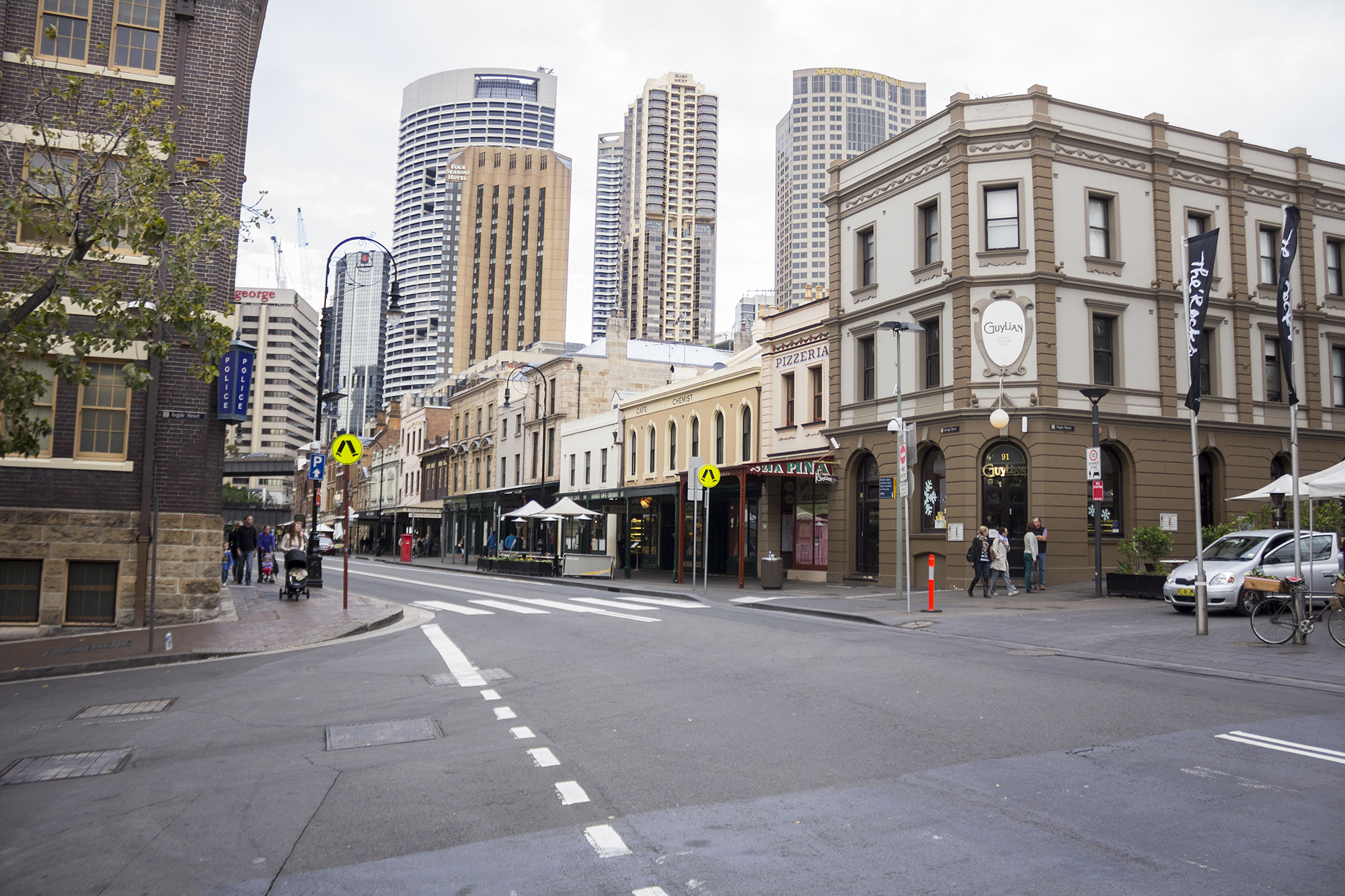
- George Street in 2014. The former ASN Hotel is on the street corner on the right side.

- Location within Sydney Location within Australia
- 33.8594°S 151.2086°E
- Location: 91 George Street, The Rocks, New South Wales, Australia

History
- Built: 1839

Site notes
- Architectural style: Victorian Italianate
- Owner: Property NSW

New South Wales Heritage Register
- Official name: ASN Hotel Building (former), Visa Offices; former Rocks Police Station; former ASN Co. Hotel
- Type: State heritage (built)
- Designated: 10 May 2002
- Reference no.: 1527
- Type: Hotel
- Category: Commercial

The ASN Hotel Building is a heritage-listed commercial building and former pub and police station located at 91 George Street, in the inner city Sydney suburb of The Rocks, New South Wales, Australia. It was built in 1839 and significantly rebuilt c. 1890-91. The property is owned by Property NSW. It was added to the New South Wales State Heritage Register on 10 May 2002.

== History ==
The site of 91 and 93 George Street was the site of the Assistant Surgeon's House, constructed shortly after the arrival of the First Fleet in 1788. The location of this residence relates to the location of the Colony's first hospital just to the south of the site. Once a more substantial hospital was constructed in Macquarie Street in 1816, the Assistant Surgeon no longer required the house.

=== Occupation by Francis Greenway ===
From about that time, the former Assistant Surgeon's house was occupied by Francis Greenway, a ticket-of-leave man who had been transported for forgery in 1814. Greenway was appointed to the position of civil architect and assistant engineer for the government in 1816, for which his salary included lodging quarters. This appointment ceased in 1822, however, Greenway refused to relinquish his government house. He produced a document (later claimed to be a forgery) purporting to give him title to the land. He appears to have continued to occupy the site until at least 1834, when the title was questioned and ownership reverted to the Crown. However, it was not until Greenway's death in 1837 that the Crown recovered the property, following action in London.

=== Acquisition by Frederic Unwin ===
Frederic Wright Unwin, solicitor and merchant, was subsequently granted the land in 1838. Unwin had extensive landholdings in the city, particularly along the western side of George Street.

==== Lease to Michael Gannon ====
On 1 July 1839, Unwin leased an area of land to Michael Gannon, carpenter, for a period of 21 years. Gannon had arrived in the colony as a convict on the Almorah in 1820 and was granted a conditional pardon in 1835. The terms of the lease required that Gannon: 'shall and will within a reasonable time and within two years at the furthest build and erect on the line of frontage to George Street as many houses as will occupy the said frontage of such dimensions as said Michael Gannon may think fit so as such houses are of three stories exclusive of cellars and built substantially and of good materials.'

It is unclear from the documentary evidence whether the Assistant Surgeon/Greenway's house had been demolished by the time Gannon took on the lease. However, by 1844, when the land was conveyed to R. A. A. Morehead and Matthew Young, Gannon had constructed a number of buildings on the land, including the New York Hotel at 91 George Street and a three-storey building at 93 George Street, as well as the terrace located at Nos. 95–99 George Street. Although Gannon was only required to erect buildings along the George Street frontage, the plan accompanying the conveyance in 1844 shows that the site also contained buildings along Argyle Street, and a workshop and stables accessible from the yard, all also presumed to be constructed by Gannon.

The resulting configuration of the block was typical of urban planning in other quarters in The Rocks, that of a central yard, accessed through a passageway, and surrounded by buildings open to the public fronting the adjacent streets, as well as workshops or factory buildings opening primarily to the yard. Gannon was also responsible for the creation of the laneway (now known as Greenway Lane) accessing the yard from Argyle Street.

===== Conversion as a hotel =====
The hotel at 91 George Street was constructed within 12 months of Gannon's acquiring the 21 year lease of the site, as he was granted a licence for the New York Hotel, George Street, in 1840. Later listings in the Sands Directory confirm that the New York Hotel was situated at the corner of George and Argyle Streets.

In 1845, the hotel was described as "stone and shingle three-storey hotel of 15 rooms" and the building then at 93 George Street was described as a "shop with 6 rooms." Sands Directory listings for the site show that the New York Hotel operated as such until 1861, while the building at 93 George Street was a seaman's boarding house. Michael Gannon died c. 1846, having been declared insolvent in 1845. The insolvency records list Gannon's address as Argyle Street, and his occupation as builder. In the early 1860s, the uses of both buildings changed. While 93 George Street became a green grocer, 91 George Street was used by Henry Fisher & Son, ship brokers, as a warehouse. By 1866, however, use of the building reverted to a hotel under John B. Bassetti, who operated the Italian Hotel.

In 1869, the name of the hotel was changed to the Liverpool Arms, as is evident in the earliest clear photographic evidence about the site. This 1875 photograph shows the building at 91 George Street in its original incarnation as a Georgian style hip-roofed building. The building on the site of 93 George Street is a three-storey building with a similar appearance to the hotel building adjacent. In 1870, the land containing 91 and 93 George Street was sold to William Yeoman, painter, and who, from the 1860s, owned the land at 95-101 George Street. After a period as the American Hotel, 91 George Street became the 'ASN Co's Hotel' in 1879. Yeoman occupied a store which was constructed by Gannon as a workshop in the yard behind George Street. In 1885, Yeoman sold the land to John Gill.

On 26 February 1890, the City Building Surveyor, George MacRae, wrote to the City of Sydney Improvement Board to alert the Board to the premises at 93 George Street which was 'in a ruinous condition and dangerous to the public.' The agent for the owner, John Lord, told the Committee:

'The house has been let on lease, in conjunction with the Tooth & Co, it is let with the hotel to Joseph Davis the Hotelkeeper at the corner, next door to No. 93, which he sublets. The lease of both the hotel and house No. 93 will expire about the 23rd or 24th of April next, or toward the end of that month; I have been in treaty with Tooth and Co. for a renewal of the lease, and for effecting all necessary repairs and alterations, but the matter is in abeyance for a while, owing to their not being able to find a suitable tenant; as soon as the matter is settled it is proposed to expend £300 or £400 upon the premises, that is both the hotel & the dwelling house. Coward & Bell, architects, have been employed to draw up specifications for necessary repairs etc.'

The Board resolved that the building be "taken down [condemned] forthwith". In so resolving, the Chairman of the Board asked the City Building Surveyor if the hotel adjoining the premises this day inspected was proposed to be dealt with, the Board having noticed that it appeared to be in a bad condition. The Surveyor responded that 'he had looked over the hotel building but it was not nearly in so bad a condition as the premises No. 93 George Street. He would, however, shortly make a more minute inspection as to its safety, when the building now condemned was taken down he would have a better opportunity of doing so.'

Although the documentary evidence does not indicate when the Board's order was carried out, the physical evidence suggests that 93 George Street was demolished and rebuilt as a two-storey with cellar shop, and that 91 George Street was substantially rebuilt at the same time, shortly after the Board's order in 1890. As both buildings were under one ownership, and both buildings were leased to Tooth & Co, it is likely that the rebuilding of the pair was carried out in a single event, resulting in the shared decorative features evident in early 20th century photographs of the buildings, including the garland decoration to the parapets. It appears that the upper floors of 91 George Street were extended toward the west and built over Greenway Lane during this substantial rebuilding.

The Sands Directory contains no listing for either building in 1891, possibly as both buildings were under construction at the time. When listed again in 1892, the ASN Hotel was under a new licensee, R. B. Goof, and 93 George Street housed O'Neill & Co, outfitters. O'Neill & Co remained in the building until 1907, when it became refreshment rooms. The ASN Hotel continued to operate as a hotel tied to Tooth & Co, under a number of different sub-leases, for most of the 20th century.

=== Resumption by the NSW Government ===
Following the outbreak of bubonic plague in Sydney's waterfront areas in 1900, the property was turned over to the Crown as part of the resumption of the entire Rocks area. Following this resumption, the Maritime Services Board administered leases of 91 and 93 George Street until 12 January 1970, when ownership was taken over by the Sydney Cove Redevelopment Authority.

Alterations to the hotel building at 93 George Street took place in 1912, 1922, and in 1928-9. During the latter 20th century, the Licensing Court and Police issued several notices to carry out repairs to the ASN Hotel. The hotel continued to accommodate a varying number of lodgers during this time. A 1955 internal Tooth & Co. report gives an understanding of the character of the Hotel and its lodgers:

'The Hotel is exceedingly old, the area is on the waterfront, and the lodgers are working men, and it is hard under these conditions to keep the rate of depreciation down the walls should be oiled in lieu of water painted or papered, so that they could be washed down.'

By the 1970s, the ASN Hotel was trading poorly in comparison to other hotels in The Rocks under Tooth & Co supervision. A 1974 report stated that the ASN Hotel sold "10 kilderkins [5 barrels] and 20 dozens of packaged beer" per week, while the other four Tooth's hotels in The Rocks (Fortune of War Hotel, Mercantile Hotel, Australian Hotel, and Glenmore Hotel) averaged 60 kilderkins (30 barrels) and 115 dozens of packaged beer on a weekly basis. In 1976, Tooth's terminated its head lease with the Sydney Cove Redevelopment Authority and hotelkeepers began to lease their premises directly from the Authority.

The ASN Hotel ceased trading on 26 January 1983 and the NSW Public Works Department subsequently commenced substantial renovations and refurbishment in order to convert the building into a police station. All traces of the 1920s renovations were removed, and the building was given a Victorian Italianate-style appearance, based on photographic evidence of its earlier appearance. The police station opened on 20 December 1983, and operated from the site until 1998 when it moved across George Street to the former NSW Department of Labour and Industry Building at 132-134 George Street. Since that time the hotel building has housed a range of tenants, the most recent as a chocolate shop.

== Description ==
The building is a three storied, brick built and cement rendered former hotel in the Victorian Italianate style. It has an unusual garland decoration below the parapet and a large cartouche (oval scrolled plaque) on the first floor splayed corner. The building was extensively altered by Tooth & Co.; in 1928. In 1983 the building was again extensively remodelled to function as a police station: the 1929 detailing was removed and the 1890s Italianate details reconstructed.

A considerable extent of the early (to 1928) fabric has been lost, but the existing fabric is in good condition.

=== Modifications and dates ===
Facade: c. 1891; 1928; 1983; Repainted 1999. There have been several internal modifications over time, including alterations to the bar configuration, and use of rooms and modifications to allow updating of services.

In 2007 it underwent refurbishment, painting and fitout for the chocolate shop.

== Heritage listing ==
The former ASN Co. Hotel and site at 91 George Street, The Rocks, is of State heritage significance for its aesthetic, historical and scientific cultural values, and its contribution to The Rocks area, which is of State Heritage significance in its own right. The building, originally designed as a hotel that spans a lane and addresses the two main thoroughfares of The Rocks (George and Argyle Streets), is a fine, rare, example of a Victorian Italianate-style corner building. The only Victorian Italianate-style hotel building in The Rocks, it contributes to the aesthetic diversity of The Rocks streetscape. The site is historically significant as a site continuously occupied by Europeans since 1788. It has associations with the first Assistant Surgeon Dr William Redfern as his house was the first structure on the site, later occupied by the first colonial architect Francis Greenway. The building is historically significant as the only extant Victorian Italianate-style hotel building in The Rocks.

The building is socially significant for its long history as a hotel, meeting place and residence for working men on the waterfront. The site is technically significant for the archaeological potential to reveal evidence of earlier configurations of the hotel structures and road surfaces and even the earlier building occupied by Greenway and the Assistant Surgeon. The site has scientific significance for the archaeological potential to reveal evidence of earlier configurations of the hotel structures, road surfaces and earlier buildings on the site. The building is socially significant for its long history, enjoyed as a pub for many decades up to 1983, and for its contribution to The Rocks area, Australia's premier heritage precinct.

ASN Hotel Building was listed on the New South Wales State Heritage Register on 10 May 2002 having satisfied the following criteria.

The place is important in demonstrating the course, or pattern, of cultural or natural history in New South Wales.

The site of 91 and 93 George Street is historically significant as a site continuously occupied by Europeans since 1788.

The configuration of the buildings and Greenway Lane is historically significant in demonstrating the approach to urban planning prevalent in The Rocks c. 1840. No. 91 George Street and the original building at 93 George Street were constructed contemporaneously, together with the buildings at 45-47 Argyle Street and 94-99 George Street, by Michael Gannon under the terms of his lease of the land, imparting this group of buildings with a shared origin and history. Further, 91 and 93 George Street are linked by their common subsequent ownership and operation (with 93 George Street functioning at times as a boarding house associated with the hotel at 91 George Street). Additionally, the construction of the current building at 93 George Street in 1890 was accompanied by the substantial rebuilding of the hotel at 91 George Street, resulting in a number of decorative features shared between the two buildings. The former ASN Hotel at 91 George Street is of historical significance as a company sponsored hotel, associated with the Australasian Steamship Navigation Company, which was a prominent transport company in 19th century NSW, operating transport between Sydney and the Hunter district from the 1851.

The former ASN Hotel at 91 George Street meets this criterion on a State level.

The place has a strong or special association with a person, or group of persons, of importance of cultural or natural history of New South Wales's history.

The site of 91 and 93 George Street is of significance for its association with the First Fleet, as the site of the house of the Assistant Surgeon from c. 1788. The Assistant Surgeon's residence is also associated with the first colonial architect, Francis Greenway, who lived in a house on the site between 1815 and c. 1834. The original buildings on the site, although demolished and rebuilt (no. 93) and substantially rebuilt (no. 91) in 1890, are associated with Michael Gannon, a ticket-of-leave convict who made a living as a builder in The Rocks, developing a substantial parcel of land, including the subject site, from 1839. Gannon is an interesting example of the mid-19th century class of pardoned convicts who remained in NSW and practiced trades or professions. The former ASN Hotel at 91 George Street meets this criterion on a State level.

The place is important in demonstrating aesthetic characteristics and/or a high degree of creative or technical achievement in New South Wales.

91 and 93 George Street, as a pair, are aesthetically significant as a fine example of the Victorian Italianate style, characterised by the unusual garland decoration below the parapet (both buildings) and the decorative cartouche located on the splayed corner of 91 George Street. 91 George Street is aesthetically significant for its prominent contribution to the streetscape at the intersection of the two main streets in The Rocks, George and Argyle Streets. Both 91 and 93 are significant as contributors to the visual diversity of the streetscape. Both buildings are aesthetically significant for their contribution to the streetscape of Greenway Lane, one of the pedestrian laneways in The Rocks area which are highly significant as evocations of the colonial townscape. The former ASN Hotel at 91 George Street meets this criterion on a State level.

The place has a strong or special association with a particular community or cultural group in New South Wales for social, cultural or spiritual reasons.

The buildings are socially significant for their long history and for their contribution to The Rocks area, Australia's premier heritage precinct, as evidenced by their inclusion on a number of lists of buildings of heritage significance formulated by community groups such as the National Trust of Australia (NSW), and representative bodies such as the City of Sydney Council and the Heritage Council of NSW.

The place has potential to yield information that will contribute to an understanding of the cultural or natural history of New South Wales.

The site is technically significant for the archaeological potential to reveal evidence of earlier configurations of the hotel structures and road surfaces as well as the c. 1788 structure occupied by the First Fleet's Assistant Surgeon and later by Francis Greenway. The former ASN Hotel at 91 George Street meets this criterion on a State level.

The place possesses uncommon, rare or endangered aspects of the cultural or natural history of New South Wales.

The building is a rare example of a Victorian Italianate-style hotel in The Rocks.

The place is important in demonstrating the principal characteristics of a class of cultural or natural places/environments in New South Wales.

The former ASN Hotel at 91 George Street is representative of hotel buildings in The Rocks in terms of its fabric, size, series of renovations, and historical uses.

== See also ==
- Australian non-residential architectural styles
- Gannon House
- 93 George Street
