= List of shipwrecks in July 1826 =

The list of shipwrecks in July 1826 includes some ships sunk, foundered, grounded, or otherwise lost during July 1826.

== 1 July ==
List of shipwrecks: 1 July 1826
Ship	State	Description
Cicero	United Kingdom	The whaler was lost in the Davis Strait. Her crew were rescued.
Venus	United Kingdom	The ship was lost on the Alerts Reef, in the Torres Strait. All on board survived. She was on a voyage from Sydney, New South Wales to Singapore. Security rescued the crew and passengers and delivered them to Batavia on 4 August.

== 7 July ==
List of shipwrecks: 7 July 1826
Ship	State	Description
Holly Lutchmy	United Kingdom	The ship was wrecked on Île Bourbon. Her crew were rescued. She was on a voyage from Madras, India to Colombo, Ceylon, then Mauritius and London.
Venus	France	The ship was run down and sunk in the Mediterranean Sea off Málaga, Spain by Fortroendt (Sweden). Her crew were rescued. Venus was on a voyage from Almería, Spain to Havre de Grâce, Seine-Inférieure.

== 8 July ==
List of shipwrecks: 8 July 1826
Ship	State	Description
Amos	United Kingdom	The ship foundered in the Atlantic Ocean. Her crew were rescued by Adeline (United Kingdom). Amos was on a voyage from Liverpool, Lancashire to Quebec City, Lower Canada, British North America.
John Gilpin	United States	The ship was lost near the Hole-in-the-Wall. She was on a voyage from Boston, Massachusetts, to Havana, Cuba.
Prince Regent	United Kingdom	The ship was on her way from Bristol to Quebec when she lost her mainmast and sails. On 18 July she had to put into Plymouth. While she was there she was found to be very leaky and had to discharge part of her cargo.

== 9 July ==
List of shipwrecks: 9 July 1826
Ship	State	Description
Maria Margarida	Denmark	The ship foundered in Cascaes Bay. She was on a voyage from Lisbon, Portugal to Aalborg.

== 14 July ==
List of shipwrecks: 14 July 1826
Ship	State	Description
Brothers	(United Kingdom of Great Britain and Ireland) British North America	The schooner was lost in White Bay.

== 16 July ==
List of shipwrecks: 16 July 1826
Ship	State	Description
Mariner	United Kingdom	The ship was abandoned in the Atlantic Ocean. Her crew were rescued by Harriet (United Kingdom). Mariner was on a voyage from the Cape of Good Hope to London.

== 18 July ==
List of shipwrecks: 18 July 1826
Ship	State	Description
Relief	United Kingdom	The ship was abandoned in the Atlantic Ocean. All on board were rescued. She was on a voyage from Saint John, New Brunswick, British North America to Belfast, County Antrim.

== 20 July ==
List of shipwrecks: 20 July 1826
Ship	State	Description
Bellgowen	United Kingdom	The ship struck the Bondicar Rocks, in the North Sea off Amble, Northumberland and was wrecked.
Thetis	United Kingdom	The ship struck rocks 3 nautical miles (5.6 km) off Jersey, Channel Islands and foundered. She was on a voyage from Newcastle upon Tyne, Northumberland to Jersey.

== 21 July ==
List of shipwrecks: 21 July 1826
Ship	State	Description
Adventure	United Kingdom	The sloop foundered in the Irish Sea 3 nautical miles (5.6 km) off Westport, County Mayo with the loss of a crew member. She was on a voyage from Liverpool, Lancashire to Coleraine, County Antrim.
Alexander	United Kingdom	The ship was driven ashore at Dunbar, Lothian. Her crew were rescued. She was on a voyage from Sunderland, County Durham to Inverness.
Friends	United Kingdom	The ship was driven ashore and wrecked at Aberdeen.
George and Agnes	United Kingdom	The ship capsized and sank off the Isle of Whithorn, Wigtownshire with the loss of all on board.
Patriot	United Kingdom	The ship was driven ashore at Dunbar. Her crew were rescued. She was on a voyage from North Shields, County Durham to Dundee, Forfarshire.
Salmon	France	The ship was discovered abandoned in the English Channel off South Foreland, United Kingdom. She was on a voyage from Saint-Valery-sur-Somme to Le Treport, Seine-Inférieure. Salmon was taken in to Ramsgate, Kent.
Speedwell	United Kingdom	The sloop was wrecked at Westport with the loss of one life.
Thomas & Isabella	United Kingdom	The ship was driven ashore at Dunbar. Her crew were rescued. She was on a voyage from North Shields to Perth.

== 22 July ==
List of shipwrecks: 22 July 1826
Ship	State	Description
Ben Jonson	United Kingdom	After the ship left Madras on 8 June 1826 she encountered several gales during which she had to throw some of her cargo overboard. She started making 2½ feet of water an hour in her hold and so put into Mauritius on 22 July to repair. Her remaining cargo was forwarded on Emulous.
Omega	United Kingdom	The ship was driven ashore in the River Mersey. She was on a voyage from Liverpool, Lancashire to Philadelphia, Pennsylvania. She was later refloated.
Union	United Kingdom	The ship was driven ashore at Seacombe Ferry, Cheshire. She was on a voyage from Liverpool to Boston, Massachusetts. She was later refloated.

== 23 July ==
List of shipwrecks: 23 July 1826
Ship	State	Description
Calista	United Kingdom	The ship was driven ashore at Wells-next-the-Sea, Norfolk. She was on a voyage from Saint Petersburg, Russia to Jersey, Channel Islands. Calista was refloated on 4 August and taken in to Wells-next-the-Sea.
John & Mary	United Kingdom	The ship was wrecked on the Knowle Sand, in the North Sea off the coast of Suffolk. She was on a voyage from Newcastle upon Tyne, Northumberland to London.

== 24 July ==
List of shipwrecks: 24 July 1826
Ship	State	Description
Celia	United Kingdom	The ship was driven ashore in the Straits of Banca. She was on a voyage from Manila, Spanish East Indies to Singapore and London. Celia was refloated with assistance from Orynthia ( (United Kingdom of the Netherlands) Netherlands East Indies) and put into Batavia, Netherlands East Indies for repairs.

== 25 July ==
List of shipwrecks: 25 July 1826
Ship	State	Description
John and Mary	United Kingdom	The ship was wrecked on the Knowle Sand, in the North Sea off Orfordness, Suffolk. She was on a voyage from Newcastle upon Tyne, Northumberland to London.

== 26 July ==
List of shipwrecks: 26 July 1826
Ship	State	Description
East Indian	United Kingdom	The transport ship was wrecked at Saugor, India with the loss of four of her crew. She was on a voyage from Rangoon, Burma to Bengal, India.
Miriam & Jane	United Kingdom	The ship capsized at Quebec City, Lower Canada, British North America and was wrecked. She was later reported as "to be repaired".

== 31 July ==
List of shipwrecks: 31 July 1826
Ship	State	Description
Martha	United Kingdom	The ship struck the Arklow Banks, in the Irish Sea off the coast of County Wicklow and sank. Her crew survived. She was on a voyage from Whitehaven, Cumberland to Cardiff, Glamorgan.

== Unknown date ==
List of shipwrecks: Unknown date in July 1826
Ship	State	Description
Balberook	(United Kingdom of Great Britain and Ireland) New South Wales	The sloop sprang a leak and foundered off Port Stephens in late July. All on board were rescued.
David Shaw	United Kingdom	The ship was abandoned in the Atlantic Ocean before 3 July. She was on a voyage from Saint John, New Brunswick, British North America to London.
Lark	(United Kingdom of Great Britain and Ireland) British North America	The schooner was lost off Cap-des-Rosiers. She was on a voyage from Saint John, New Brunswick to Quebec City, Lower Canada.
Sally	(United Kingdom of Great Britain and Ireland) New South Wales	The schooner foundered off Waterhouse Island with the loss of thirteen lives.
Victoire Agla	France	The ship was wrecked on the Domesness Reef, in the Baltic Sea before 7 July.
