= 93 George Street, The Rocks =

Heritage-listed building in Sydney, Australia

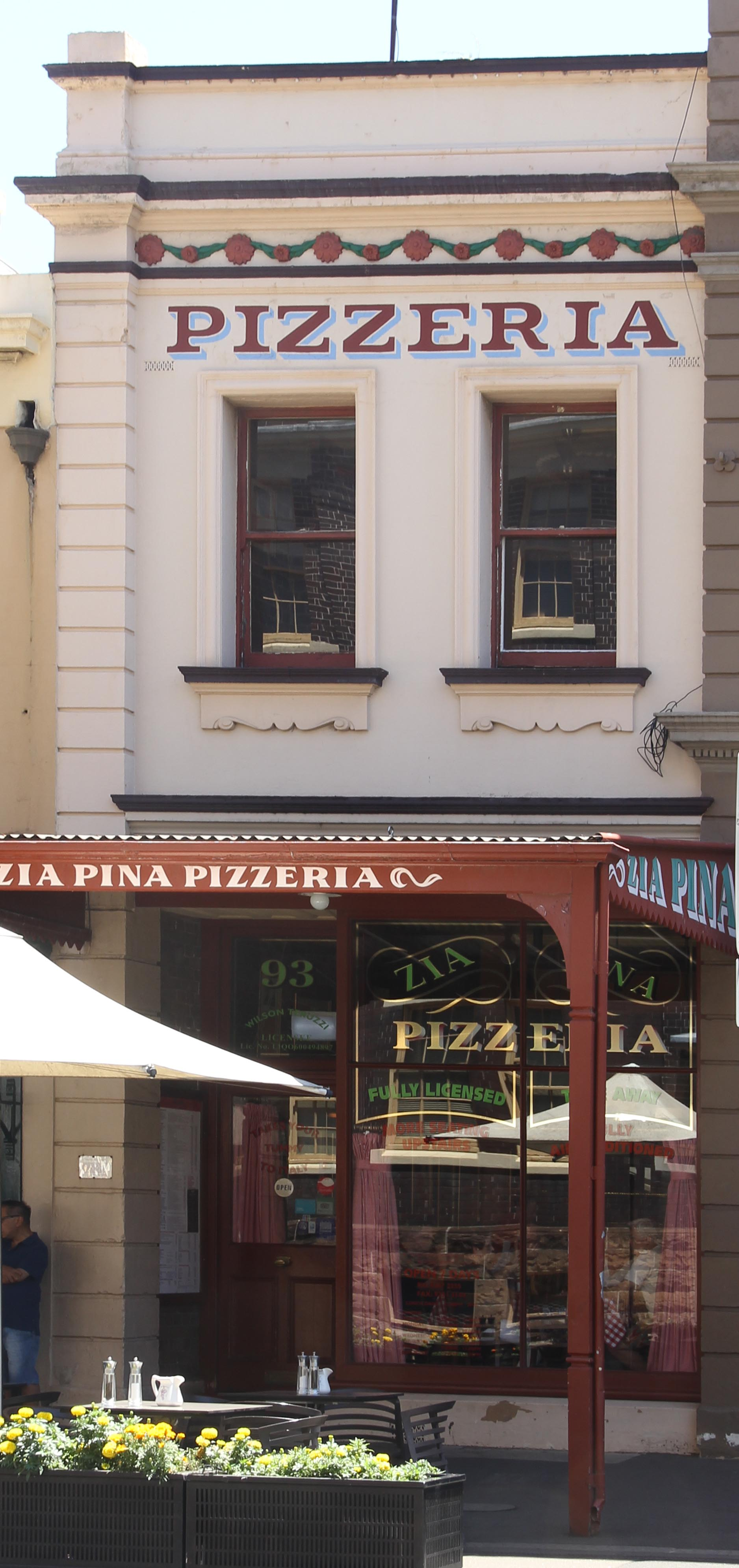
- The Zia Pina Pizzeria shop, pictured in 2019.

- Location within Sydney Location within Australia
- 33.8594°S 151.2086°E
- Location: 93 George Street, The Rocks, City of Sydney, New South Wales, Australia

History
- Built: 1891

Site notes
- Architectural style: Victorian Italianate
- Owner: Property NSW

New South Wales Heritage Register
- Official name: Shop, Zia Pina Pizzeria; Built as part of ASN Co Hotel; Zia Pina Pizzeria
- Type: State heritage (built)
- Designated: 10 May 2002
- Reference no.: 1591
- Type: Shop
- Category: Retail and Wholesale

93 George Street, The Rocks is a heritage-listed former dwelling and now retail building located at 93 George Street in the inner city Sydney suburb of The Rocks in the City of Sydney local government area of New South Wales, Australia. It was built in 1891. It is also known as Zia Pina Pizzeria. The property is owned by Property NSW, an agency of the Government of New South Wales. It was added to the New South Wales State Heritage Register on 10 May 2002.

== History ==
The site of 91 and 93 George Street was the site of the Assistant Surgeon's House, constructed shortly after the arrival of the First Fleet in 1788. The location of this residence relates to the location of the Colony's first hospital just to the south of the site.

Once a more substantial hospital was constructed in Macquarie Street in 1816, the Assistant Surgeon no longer required the house. From about that time, the former Assistant Surgeon's house was occupied by Francis Greenway, a ticket-of-leave man who had been transported for forgery in 1814. Greenway was appointed to the position of civil architect and assistant engineer for the government in 1816, for which his salary included lodging quarters. This appointment ceased in 1822, however, Greenway refused to relinquish his government house. He produced a document (later claimed to be a forgery) purporting to give him title to the land. He appears to have continued to occupy the site until at least 1834, when the title was questioned and ownership reverted to the Crown. However, it was not until Greenway's death in 1837 that the Crown recovered the property, following action in London.

Frederic Wright Unwin, solicitor and merchant, was subsequently granted the land in 1838. Unwin had extensive landholdings in the city, particularly along the western side of George Street. On 1 July 1839, Unwin leased an area of land to Michael Gannon, carpenter, for a period of 21 years. Gannon had arrived in the colony as a convict on the Almorah in 1820 and was granted a conditional pardon in 1835.

The terms of the lease required that Gannon:

'shall and will within a reasonable time and within two years at the furthest build and erect on the line of frontage to George Street as many houses as will occupy the said frontage of such dimensions as said Michael Gannon may think fit so as such houses are of three stories exclusive of cellars and built substantially and of good materials.'

It is unclear from the documentary evidence whether the Assistant Surgeon/Greenway's house had been demolished by the time Gannon took on the lease. However, by 1844, when the land was conveyed to R. A. A. Morehead and Matthew Young, Gannon had constructed a number of buildings on the land, including the New York Hotel at 91 George Street and a three-storey building at 93 George Street, as well as the terrace 95-99 George Street. Although Gannon was only required to erect buildings along the George Street frontage, the plan accompanying the conveyance in 1844 shows that the site also contained buildings along Argyle Street, and a workshop and stables accessible from the yard, all also presumed to be constructed by Gannon.

The resulting configuration of the block was typical of urban planning in other quarters in The Rocks, that of a central yard, accessed through a passageway, and surrounded by buildings open to the public fronting the adjacent streets, as well as workshops or factory buildings opening primarily to the yard. Gannon was also responsible for the creation of the laneway (now known as Greenway Lane) accessing the yard from Argyle Street.

In 1845, the hotel was described as "stone and shingle 3 storey hotel of 15 rooms" and the building then at 93 George Street was described as a "shop with 6 rooms." Sands Directory listings for the site show that the New York Hotel operated as such until 1861, while the building at 93 George Street was a seaman's boarding house. Michael Gannon died c. 1846, having been declared insolvent in 1845. The insolvency records list Gannon's address as Argyle Street, and his occupation as builder. In the early 1860s, the uses of both buildings changed. While 93 George Street became a green grocer, 91 George Street was used by Henry Fisher & Son, ship brokers, as a warehouse. By 1866, however, use of the building reverted to a hotel under John B. Bassetti, who operated the Italian Hotel.

In 1870, the land containing 91 and 93 George Street was sold to William Yeoman, painter, and who, from the 1860s, owned the land at 95-101 George Street. Yeoman occupied a store which was constructed by Gannon as a workshop in the yard behind George Street. In 1885, Yeoman sold the land to John Gill. Eliza Hirshan was the occupant for 1848-1850 and Robert Brickell occupied the shop between 1851-57. From 1863 Mrs Rosa O'Brian, a dealer and fruiterer occupied the shop and dwelling owned by Messrs. Moorehead & Young and in 1869 the Chinese Merchants, Sun Lee Kee & Co. were the tenants. The tenement was turned into a boarding house in 1870 and remained so until 1877 apparently annexed to the public house adjacent on the north side. However, in 1877 Mrs Honorah Lawrence re-established the premises as a green grocers shop. She remained as a tenant until 1888. In 1889 Mrs Ada Boyce managed refreshment rooms.

Although listed as a boarding house intermittently from 1859, the ground floor of 93 George Street was consistently occupied by a green grocer until 1889, when it was listed as a boarding house. It is possible that a boarding house operated in the upper floors even during years that a green grocer is recorded in the Sands Directory as the occupant of the building. Documentary evidence dating to 1890 shows that the building housed lodgers in association with the (now named) ASN Hotel Building at 91 George Street.

On 26 February 1890, the City Building Surveyor, George MacRae, wrote to the City of Sydney Improvement Board to alert the Board to the premises at 93 George Street which was "in a ruinous condition and dangerous to the public." The request was marked "Urgent" and was considered by the Board at a meeting two days later, during which the Board made a visit to the site. The same day, the Board heard received statements from the City Building Surveyor as well as John Lord, agent for the owner of the property, Robert Gill, grazier of Moonbi, who had inherited the land after John Gill's death in 1888. The City Building Surveyor's evidence before the Board provides a good account of the building:

'I noticed that the foundation of the back wall appeared to be of rubble, the inside portion had fallen completely away, & was lying on the floor of the cellar. I could see nothing supporting the wall above but a few rough stones which formed the outer portion of the wall. These stones are fretted away and very much decayed, so that daylight could be seen between the joints. I failed to see what is keeping up the wall. Portion of the flooring at the back is also extremely dangerous, the joists have quite rotted away, leaving no support. There are several cracks in the back wall extending upwards from the lintels to the sills of the first floor windows. These cracks appear to be of some age. The back premises and outhouses are also in a dangerous condition, the brickwork is decayed and has partially fallen. The middle pier of the front wall is bulged out to about the extent of about three or four inches. There are also cracks in the front wall. The roof appears to be leaking as some of the walls are damp.'

The agent for the owner, John Lord, told the Committee:

'The house has been let on lease, in conjunction with the Tooth & Co, it is let with the hotel to Joseph Davis the Hotelkeeper at the corner, next door to No. 93, which he sublets. The lease of both the hotel and house No. 93 will expire about the 23rd or 24th of April next, or toward the end of that month; I have been in treaty with Tooth & Co. for a renewal of the lease, and for effecting all necessary repairs and alterations, but the matter is in abeyance for a while, owing to their not being able to find a suitable tenant; as soon as the matter is settled it is proposed to expend £300 or £400 upon the premises, that is both the hotel & the dwelling house. Coward & Bell, architects, have been employed to draw up specifications for necessary repairs etc. I have not been down in the cellar, but I looked through the house No. 93 some time ago. I do not know whether the foundations are dangerous or not.'

In response to questions from the Board, Lord stated that he was not aware that there were 25 beds in five rooms and that in one room 19' x 17' there were nine beds. He said that his attention had been drawn only that day to some stones in the cellar having collapsed. The Board resolved that the building be "taken down [condemned] forthwith". In so resolving, the Chairman of the Board asked the City Building Surveyor if the "hotel adjoining the premises this day inspected was proposed to be dealt with, the Board having noticed that it appeared to be in a bad condition." The Surveyor responded that "he had looked over the hotel building but it was not nearly in so bad a condition as the premises No. 93 George Street". He would, however, shortly make a more minute inspection as to its safety, when the building now condemned was taken down he would have a better opportunity of doing so.

Although the documentary evidence does not indicate when the Board's order was carried out, the physical evidence suggests that 93 George Street was demolished and rebuilt as a two-storey with cellar shop, and that 91 George Street was substantially rebuilt at the same time, shortly after the Board's order in 1890. As both buildings were under one ownership, and both buildings were leased to Tooth & Co, it is likely that the rebuilding of the pair was carried out in a single event, resulting in the shared decorative features evident in early 20th century photographs of the buildings, including the garland decoration to the parapets. It appears that the upper floors of 91 George Street were extended toward the west and built over Greenway Lane during this substantial rebuilding.

The Sands Directory contains no listing for either building in 1891, possibly as both buildings were under construction at the time. When listed again in 1892, the ASN Hotel was under a new licensee, R. B. Goof, and 93 George Street housed O'Neill & Co, outfitters. O'Neill & Co remained in the building until 1907, when it became refreshment rooms.

Following the outbreak of plague in Sydney's waterfront areas in 1900, the property was turned over to the Crown as part of the resumption of the entire Rocks area. Following this resumption, the Maritime Services Board administered leases of 91 and 93 George Street until 12 January 1970, when ownership was taken over by the Sydney Cove Redevelopment Authority. In 1976, the shop at 93 George Street underwent substantial renovations and opened as the Zia Pina Pizzeria.

== Description ==
The Victorian Italianate style building is a two storied, brick built and cement rendered shop, constructed as part of the adjacent former ASN Hotel. It has an unusual garland decoration below the parapet. The shopfront was altered by Tooth & Co.; in 1928. In 1983, as part of the work to adapt the adjacent hotel to a police station, the shopfront (1928) was removed and an "1890s shopfront" constructed. The 1983 shopfront is not a reconstruction of the original shopfront, the details of which are unknown (2001).

Style: Victorian Italianate; Storeys: 2; Roof Cladding: Corrugated Iron; Floor Frame: Timber.

=== Condition ===
As at 3 May 2001, Archaeology Assessment Condition: Mostly disturbed. Assessment Basis: Floors level with George Street, but below that of Greenway Lane. Cellars below.

=== Modifications and dates ===
Facade: c. 1891; 1928; & 1983

== Heritage listing ==
As at 31 March 2011, the Zia Pina Pizza Shop and site is of State heritage significance for its aesthetic, historical and scientific cultural values and its contribution to The Rocks area, which is of State Heritage significance in its own right.

The shop at 93 George Street, built c. 1890 after a previous (c. 1840) building on the site was condemned by the City Improvement Board, provides an interesting reflection of the 19th century approach to town sanitation and improvements.

Although a modest two-storey shop building typical of its time, 93 George Street shares a number of decorative elements with the former ASN Hotel building at 91 George Street, and contributes to the aesthetic diversity of The Rocks streetscape. The site is historically significant as a place continuously occupied by Europeans since 1788, and for the associations of the site with the first colonial architect Francis Greenway. Together with other buildings in the immediate vicinity constructed by emancipist Michael Gannon, the site, including Greenway Lane, demonstrates an approach to town planning typical of the 1840s development of The Rocks.

The site has scientific significance for the archaeological potential to reveal evidence of road surfaces and earlier buildings on the site. The building is socially significant for its long history, and for its contribution to The Rocks area, Australia's premier heritage precinct.

Shop, Zia Pina Pizzeria was listed on the New South Wales State Heritage Register on 10 May 2002 having satisfied the following criteria.

The place is important in demonstrating the course, or pattern, of cultural or natural history in New South Wales.

The site of 91 and 93 George Street is historically significant as a site continuously occupied by Europeans since 1788.

The configuration of the buildings and Greenway Lane is historically significant in demonstrating the approach to urban planning prevalent in The Rocks c. 1840. No. 91 George Street and the original building at 93 George Street were constructed contemporaneously, together with the buildings at 45-47 Argyle Street and 94-99 George Street, by Michael Gannon under the terms of his lease of the land, imparting this group of buildings with a shared origin and history. Further, 91 and 93 George Street are linked by their common subsequent ownership and operation (with 93 George Street functioning at times as a boarding house associated with the hotel at 91 George Street). Additionally, the construction of the current building at 93 George Street in 1890 was accompanied by the substantial rebuilding of the hotel at 91 George Street, resulting in a number of decorative features shared between the two buildings.

The current building at 93 George Street was constructed in 1890 as a direct result of the condemnation of the previous building on the site by the City of Sydney Improvement Board, and is an interesting reflection of the 19th century approach to town sanitation and improvements.

The shop at 93 George Street meets this criterion on a State level.

The place has a strong or special association with a person, or group of persons, of importance of cultural or natural history of New South Wales's history.

The site of 91 and 93 George Street is of significance for its association with the First Fleet, as the site of the house of the Assistant Surgeon from c1788. The Assistant Surgeon's residence is also associated with the first colonial architect, Francis Greenway, who lived in a house on the site between 1815 and c. 1834.

The original buildings on the site, although demolished and rebuilt (no. 93) and substantially rebuilt (no. 91) in 1890, are associated with Michael Gannon, a ticket-of-leave convict who made a living as a builder in The Rocks, developing a substantial parcel of land, including the subject site, from 1839. Gannon is an interesting example of the mid-19th century class of pardoned convicts who remained in NSW and practiced trades or professions.

The shop at 93 George Street meets this criterion on a State level.

The place is important in demonstrating aesthetic characteristics and/or a high degree of creative or technical achievement in New South Wales.

91 and 93 George Street, as a pair, are aesthetically significant as a fine example of the Victorian Italianate style, characterised by the unusual garland decoration below the parapet (both buildings) and the decorative cartouche located on the splayed corner of 91 George Street.

91 George Street is aesthetically significant for its prominent contribution to the streetscape at the intersection of the two main streets in The Rocks, George and Argyle Streets. Although making a less prominent contribution to the streetscape, 93 George Street is of significance in continuing the uniform character of the smaller scale retail shop buildings with awnings found along George Street in The Rocks.

Both 91 and 93 are significant as contributors to the visual diversity of the streetscape. Both buildings are aesthetically significant for their contribution to the streetscape of Greenway Lane, one of the pedestrian laneways in The Rocks area which are highly significant as evocations of the colonial townscape. The shop at 93 George Street meets this criterion on a State level.

The place has a strong or special association with a particular community or cultural group in New South Wales for social, cultural or spiritual reasons.

The buildings are socially significant for their long history and for their contribution to The Rocks area, Australia's premier heritage precinct, as evidenced by their inclusion on a number of lists of buildings of heritage significance formulated by community groups such as the National Trust of Australia (NSW), and representative bodies such as the City of Sydney Council and the Heritage Council of NSW.

The place has potential to yield information that will contribute to an understanding of the cultural or natural history of New South Wales.

The site is technically significant for the archaeological potential to reveal evidence of earlier configurations of the hotel structures and road surfaces as well as the c1788 structure occupied by the First Fleet's Assistant Surgeon and later by Francis Greenway.

The place possesses uncommon, rare or endangered aspects of the cultural or natural history of New South Wales.

The building has rarity value being a component of the extant Victorian Italianate-style hotel and shop building in The Rocks.

The place is important in demonstrating the principal characteristics of a class of cultural or natural places/environments in New South Wales.

The former ASN Hotel at 91 George Street is representative of hotel buildings in The Rocks in terms of its fabric, size, series of renovations, and historical uses. Likewise, the shop at 93 George Street is an example of the large number Victorian period retail shops in The Rocks of similar fabric, size, periodic renovations, and uses.

The shop at 93 George Street meets this criterion on a local level.

== See also ==
- Australian residential architectural styles
- ASN Hotel Building, 91 George Street
- 95-99 George Street
