= Glenmore Hotel =

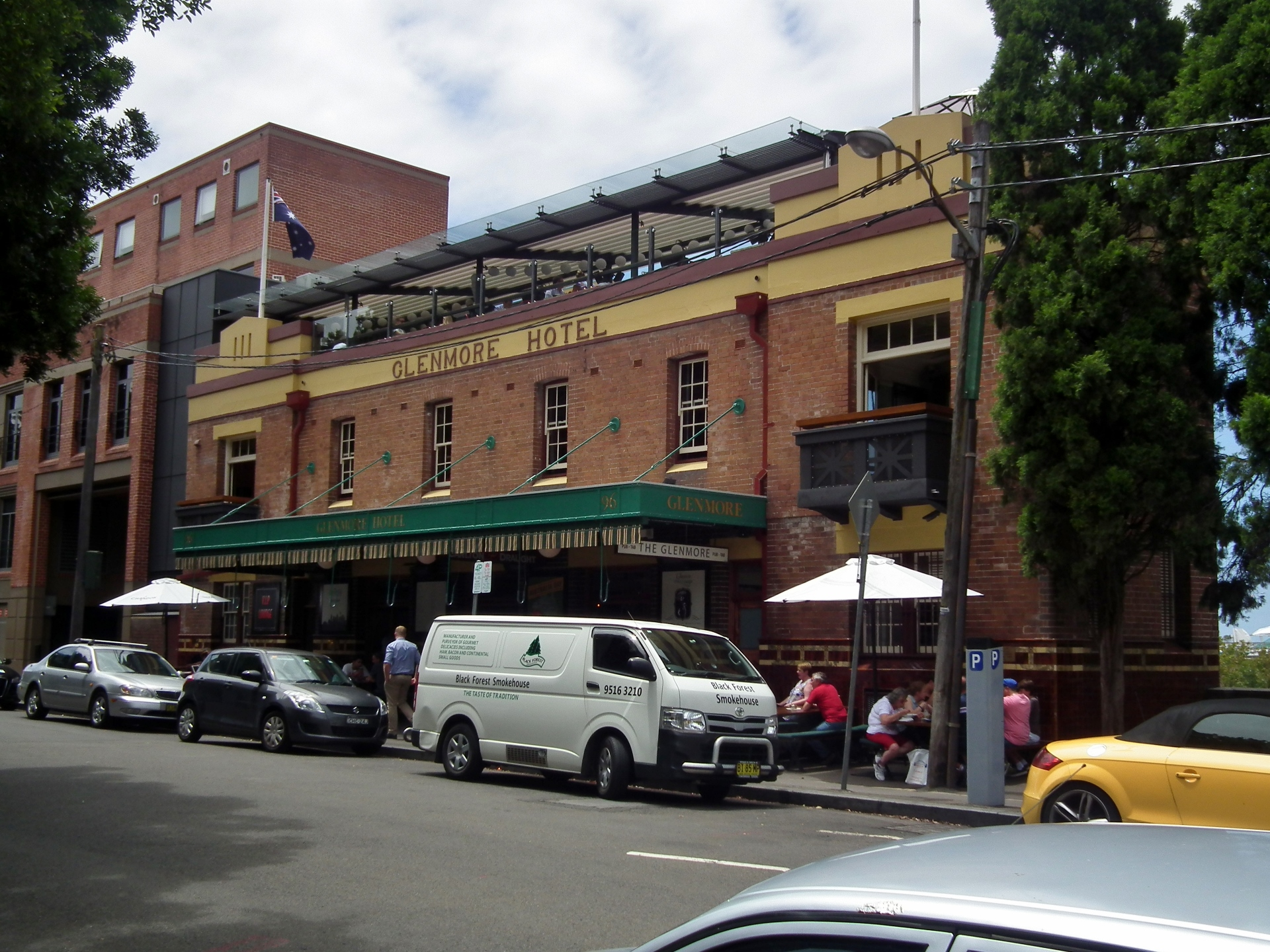
- The Glenmore Hotel in 2014

- Location within Sydney Location within Australia
- 33.8587°S 151.2074°E
- Location: 96–98 Cumberland Street, The Rocks, City of Sydney, New South Wales, Australia

History
- Built: 1921

Site notes
- Architect: Tooth and Co. resident architects
- Architectural style: Inter-war Georgian Revival
- Owner: Property NSW

New South Wales Heritage Register
- Official name: Glenmore Hotel
- Type: State heritage (built)
- Designated: 10 May 2002
- Reference no.: 1549
- Type: Hotel
- Category: Commercial
- Builders: D. M. Mitchell

The Glenmore Hotel is a heritage-listed pub located at 96–98 Cumberland Street, in the inner city Sydney suburb of The Rocks in the City of Sydney local government area of New South Wales, Australia. It was designed by the Tooth and Co. resident architects and built in 1921 by D. M. Mitchell. The property is owned by Property NSW, an agency of the Government of New South Wales. It was added to the New South Wales State Heritage Register on 10 May 2002.

== History ==
The subject site is known to have been occupied from the early years of 1800, although it is likely that, like the other ridges of The Rocks, it was occupied by the encampment of settlers in the first weeks of the arrival of the First Fleet in 1788. Originally a residential area for the wealthier people in the colony, away from and above the hospital and its gardens, Meehan's 1807 plan shows a schematic shaded area representing buildings, although these are very sparse in the area of the site. The 1835 Russell Survey of Section 87 Town of Sydney shows part of the site, specifically allotment number 12, was owned by Andrew Coss whose pub, The Punch Bowl, was within the site curtilage between 1832 and 1834. It is thought that a hotel may have been there as early as 1816. Previously Coss had been the proprietor of a pub of the same name in Cambridge Street and after 1834 the license was transferred to Argyle Street. To the north, number 11 is owned by James and Ann Curtis.

In 1864 The Sydney Sands Directory lists Peter Stanton, Grocer, James Harris and George Bainbridge, Master Mariner occupying the houses on the site and Doves plan of 1880 shows three houses, presumably the same ones, at 80-84 Cumberland Street. According to the Sands Directory, they were occupied by Charles William Heydon, Shipwright (80) and John Smith (84), number 82 being vacant. In the 1870s Belleek Terrace, which was mentioned in the Commission into Chinese gambling and corruption in the police force, occupied the site on Gloucester Walk and was not demolished until the beginning of World War I.

By 1900, Charles Crichton, Storekeeper and Frank Duncan, Boot Maker are listed at 80 Cumberland Street, while 84 was occupied by John Byrnes and Walter L. Whetton was at 86, both of whom lived in the terraces until 1910. The 1901 Darling Harbour Resumption Plan shows block 285 as part of the estate of Francis Smith, Trustees John Powell and Fred K. Smith. At this time the depth of the site at its centre line between Cumberland and Gloucester Streets was only 13 metres (43 ft).

=== Development as a hotel ===
The current Glenmore Hotel is the second hotel in Cumberland Street to bear that name. The first Glenmore Hotel was located to the north of the current hotel on the western side of the street and had been condemned principally because of the imminent construction of the southern approaches to the Harbour Bridge. In April 1919 the Housing Board wrote to Tooth & Co that the hotel was "ruinous and dilapidated" and "the Board will be glad to know whether you would be prepared to treat for a 50-years [sic] building lease of the site occupied by this Hotel, as, if so, then we will be prepared to consider the same." Tooth & Co accepted the offer of the new site next to the Argyle Cut and accepted the stipulation that the new building would cost more than £4,000.

It appears that a contract was let for £6,030 in late 1919 or early 1920 with a builder, D. M. Mitchell. By April 1920 the project had come to a halt due to the tardiness of the Water Board in relaying drains in the vicinity of the site. The Builder claimed £257 damages for the delay but the claim was waived after a restructured contract had been agreed to in which Mitchell would not claim his 7.5% fee on the amount that the contract exceeded £7,500. To counter the extreme topography of the site bisecting the ridge between Millers Point and The Rocks, the cellars for the new building were cut to the level of Gloucester Street, effectively destroying the bulk of the archaeological evidence of any previous subdivisions and earlier buildings.

By June 1921 the project was becoming sufficiently complete for Tooth & Co to accept a quotation from Bebarfald's Ltd for furnishing the hotel. It appears that the new hotel opened in July 1921 as the old Glenmore Hotel was handed over to the Housing Board on 5 July 1921. The final cost of the hotel is recorded as having been £7,905/7/4. Some of this information conflicts with that of the Sydney Cove Redevelopment Authority.

The subsequent history of the Glenmore Hotel has been fairly uneventful which is typical of other hotels in the Upper Rocks. A few licensees lost their license for in breach of legislation (e.g. trading after hours) and trade fell off during the depression, which coincided with the hotel's loss of clients when the houses opposite were demolished for construction of the Sydney Harbour Bridge. Trade was also badly affected for a few years around 1952 when Cumberland Street was blocked off due to the unsafe nature of the bridge over Argyle Street (the bridge bearing similar cracks to the Glenmore Hotel itself).

The fabric of the building remained remarkably intact until the 1950s when significant interior alterations were made, especially the removal of the canopy to the bar. The building suffered structural problems from the outset with a continual record of cracks to the walls and parapets which eventually led to the alterations made by the Sydney Cove Redevelopment Authority in 1973 when the tiled bar was shortened and in 1975 when the parapets were removed, the Cumberland Street balconies, the kitchen stairs and the roof top laundry were removed, and a reinforced concrete ring beam and metal handrail was installed to the top of the walls to restrain them. Another major exterior alteration is the painting of the south and east walls of the hotel, assumed to be done under SCRA. The hotel was refurbished in 2005.

== Description ==
The Glenmore Hotel is a three-storey building with a brick facade and exterior and a plastered interior with a tiled wall dado to the public bar.

== Heritage listing ==
The Glenmore Hotel and site are of State heritage significance for their historical and scientific cultural values. The site and building are also of State heritage significance for their contribution to The Rocks area which is of State Heritage significance in its own right. The Glenmore Hotel was constructed c. 1921 by prominent Sydney brewery Tooth & Co and was designed in the Inter-war Georgian Revival style of architecture by a Tooth & Co resident architect. The Hotel contributes to the historic, aesthetic and social values of the state significant precinct of The Rocks through its use, architectural style, building form, streetscape contribution and period of construction.

The Glenmore Hotel is significant to the local area for its historic and aesthetic values. It is historically representative of changing hotel operations during the 20th century due to shifting legislation and drinking habits. These changes are embodied in the fabric of the building and are evident in the continuation of the original accommodation uses; the provision of additional facilities such as bathrooms; and the altering of redundant spaces, such as the former parlour, for new uses. The Hotel is historically associated with the prominent Sydney brewery Tooth & Co and its form, fabric and architectural style is representative of Tooths attempt to improve the image of hotels and drinking during the Inter-war period. Aesthetically, the Glenmore Hotel is representative of the Georgian Revival style of architecture that was popular during the Inter-war period for the reconstruction or remodelling of earlier hotels. The characteristic features of the hotel include face brick walling, rendered and painted details, external tiling, regular fenestration, symmetrical facade, and multi-paned sash windows. As with most hotels, the Glenmore Hotel has been altered with the removal of the original facade balconies, parapet and bar although, the internal spaces have remained largely intact.

Glenmore Hotel was listed on the New South Wales State Heritage Register on 10 May 2002 having satisfied the following criteria.

The place is important in demonstrating the course, or pattern, of cultural or natural history in New South Wales.

Continuously occupied since it was built in 1921, the subject site offers a colourful and varied history of drinking and leisure activities of The Rocks during the 20th century. The changes in attitudes to drinking and the laws associated with it have been embodied in the very fabric of the building through the continuation of original uses such as accommodation; the provision of facilities such as additional bathrooms; and altering spaces for new uses as seen in the former parlour. The Glenmore Hotel, relocated and rebuilt during the Inter-war period, is associated with that phase of resumption and redevelopment in state significant The Rocks precinct. It is historically evident of the program of redevelopment taken to sanitise and improve living conditions in The Rocks.

The place has a strong or special association with a person, or group of persons, of importance of cultural or natural history of New South Wales's history.

Designed and later altered by Tooth & Co Brewers, the Glenmore Hotel is significant for its connection to one of Sydney's oldest brewing companies. Tooths was associated with numerous hotels in The Rocks including the Fortune of War Hotel, the ASN Hotels and the Australian Hotel. Consequently the company had a notable presence in The Rocks and contributed to the social and economic life of people in the area. The Glenmore Hotel is one of many hotels throughout NSW that were reconstructed or altered by Tooth & Co during the Inter-war period in an effort to present a more wholesome image of hotels, drinking and beer.

The place is important in demonstrating aesthetic characteristics and/or a high degree of creative or technical achievement in New South Wales.

Constructed c. 1921 and designed by an unknown Tooth & Co architect the Glenmore Hotel is a representative example of a largely intact Inter-war Georgian Revival style hotel. Along with the Art Deco, Functionalist, and Free Classical styles of the period the Georgian Revival style was popular for new and modified hotels. The stylistic features of the Hotel include the use of face brick, rendered and painted details, regular fenestration, symmetrical façade, multipaned sash windows, parapet and pediments. The load bearing wall and timber floor construction is typical of the period. The employment of details is relatively utilitarian in comparison to excellent examples of the style but comparable to that of other Tooth & Co Hotels. The aesthetic integrity of the hotel has been diminished through alterations including the removal of the parapet and the façade balconies. The Glenmore Hotel makes a strong contribution to the streetscape and the urban morphology of state significant precinct of The Rocks owing to its form, details and materials. It employs elements in its design characteristic of hotels in The Rocks that were constructed or altered in the Inter-war period by Tooth & Co.

The place has a strong or special association with a particular community or cultural group in New South Wales for social, cultural or spiritual reasons.

The Rocks is socially valuable for the esteem in which the place is held and the contribution to the identity of the wider Sydney community. As a place with a continuous and public use the Glenmore Hotel is considered to make a contribution to the social significance of the Rocks both for its built form as well as its use. The Glenmore Hotel is considered to have some social associations with local patrons and those who visit The Rocks for its public use and as a place of social interaction.

The place has potential to yield information that will contribute to an understanding of the cultural or natural history of New South Wales.

The site has moderate potential at the Gloucester Street frontage for the recovery of early housing and settlement remains especially deep features such as wells and cesspits. Excavations for four piers during the construction of the northern courtyard fire stairs exposed a section of the former Gloucester Street roadway and kerb. It was destroyed for the foundation of the stairs but it was presumed that further segments survive to the north and south. The site was significantly modified by excavating to the level of the Gloucester Street elevation for the construction of the existing hotel building and hence it is unlikely that significant archaeological deposits remain. Owing to the extent of disturbance of the site potential for indigenous archaeological artefacts at the site is considered to be low.

The place possesses uncommon, rare or endangered aspects of the cultural or natural history of New South Wales.

Together with the Australian Hotel and the Long's Lane complex of terraces the Glenmore Hotel is the last surviving pre-Harbour Bridge Building in Cumberland Street north of the Cahill Expressway and is therefore a remnant of the pre-1930 period of urban development in The Rocks.

The place is important in demonstrating the principal characteristics of a class of cultural or natural places/environments in New South Wales.

The Glenmore Hotel is historically representative of the phase of resumptions and redevelopment in The Rocks during the Inter-war period. The Hotel is historically representative of the period of Hotel redevelopment during the Inter-war period by major breweries to enhance the "ale-ing" public image of hotels and drinking. The Glenmore Hotel is typical of the program of major alterations or reconstruction of earlier hotels which has largely resulted in the hotel aesthetic surviving throughout NSW. The Glenmore Hotel is aesthetically representative of the Inter-war Georgian Revival style of commercial architecture which is common to hotels of the Inter-war period.

== See also ==
- Australian non-residential architectural styles
