= British Seamen's Hotel =

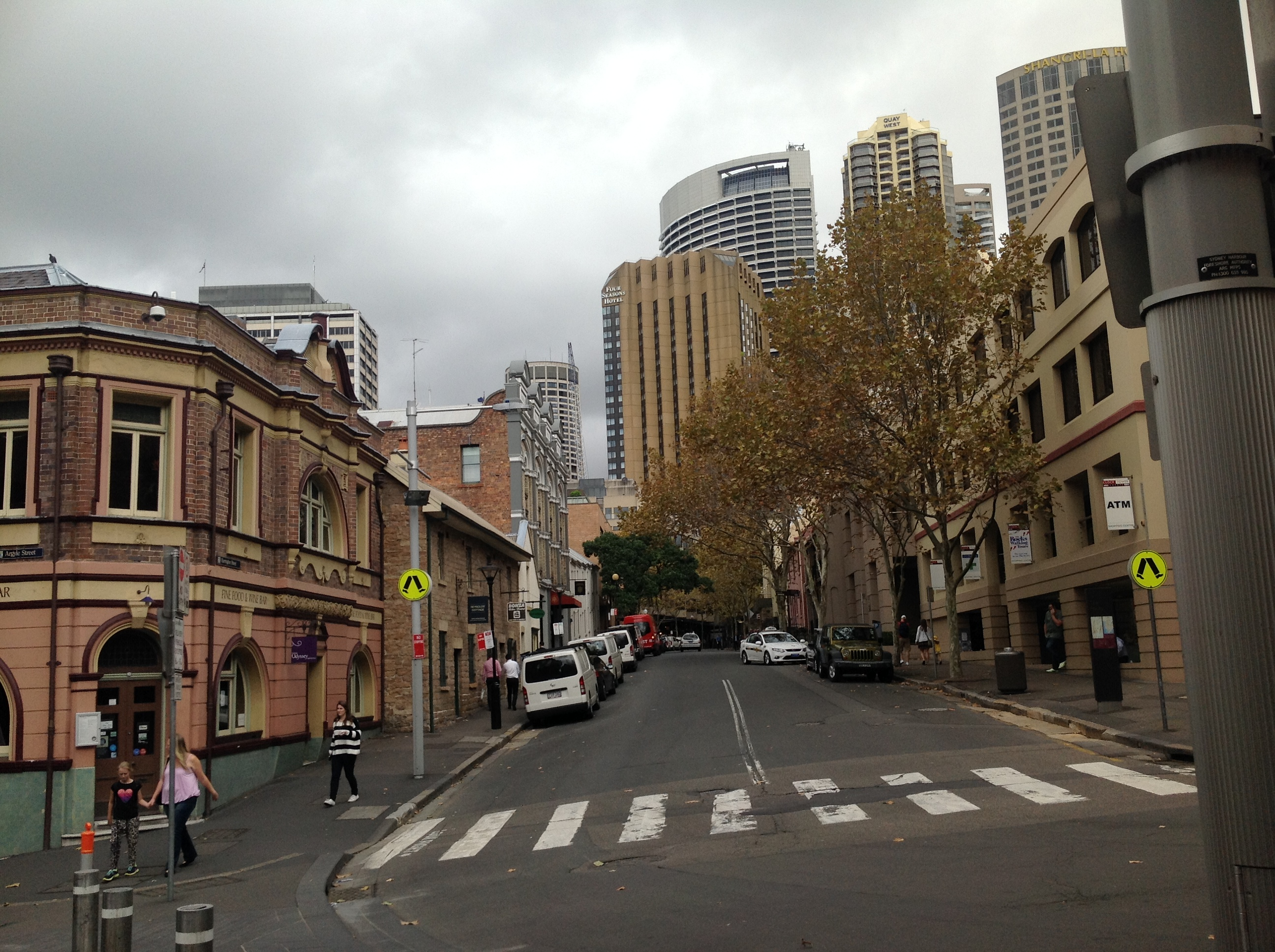
- Argyle Street in 2014; the former hotel is on the left on the street corner

- Location within Sydney Location within Australia
- 33.8594°S 151.2082°E
- Location: 39–43 Argyle Street, The Rocks, City of Sydney, New South Wales, Australia

History
- Built: 1886
- Built for: John Gill

Site notes
- Architectural style: Federation Free Classical
- Owner: Property NSW

New South Wales Heritage Register
- Official name: British Seamen's Hotel (former); Parker Gallery; Sydney Cove Providore; British Seamen's Hotel
- Type: State heritage (built)
- Designated: 10 May 2002
- Reference no.: 1532
- Type: Hotel
- Category: Commercial

The British Seamen's Hotel is a heritage-listed bar and former hotel, boarding house, office building located at 39–43 Argyle Street, in the inner city Sydney suburb of The Rocks in the City of Sydney local government area of New South Wales, Australia. John Gill built the property in 1886 and is owned by Property NSW, an agency of the Government of New South Wales. It was added to the New South Wales State Heritage Register on 10 May 2002.

== History ==
The site was at the rear of the Assistant Colonial Surgeon, Dr William Redfern's residence and formed part of the Hospital Garden between 1795–1816. Harrington Street was formed in 1810 as part of Macquarie's rationalisation of Sydney streets. During an archaeological excavation near the intersection of Harrington and Argyle Streets in 1989–90, architectural remains, including terracotta roof tiles, were associated with a building demolished by the early 1820s, possibly constructed before the creation of Harrington Street.

The Sydney Hospital was transferred to Macquarie Street in 1816, the Assistant Surgeon's residence being occupied by architect Francis Greenway until the 1830s. The exact nature of Greenway's occupation is contentious. When ordered to quit the property in 1822, he was building a new house. Greenway claimed that the Governor had promised him the land, however as soon as Macquarie left the colony, an eviction notice was served, and Macquarie couldn't substantiate Greenway's claim. Greenway was still living in the house in the 1830s, and it is unclear what the outcome of the eviction was. Plans of 1834 show Greenway as the sole claimant of the George Street side of the block and contesting ownership of the Harrington Street frontage, the subject site. However, by 1823 the corner of Harrington and Argyle Streets was occupied by someone other than Greenway and another round of claims began that lasted until at least 1837.

=== Contested ownership ===
The site's possession was hotly contested, the protagonists being James Rampling / William Hawkins and John Gleeson / Thomas Ryan. William Hawkins was said to have been granted the land by Macquarie on or before 1822. Rampling claimed to have paid Hawkins thirty pounds for the allotment transfer in 1822 and had built a two-storey house and fence on it. Rampling arrived in the colony as a convict under a 14-year sentence in 1814, his occupation described as a "plummer". By the 1820s, he described himself as a baker, and the house he built has a bakehouse attached and the possible remains of a bakehouse next door at the rear of 28 Harrington Street.

In 1824 Rampling was ordered by D'Arcy Wentworth, the Police Superintendent, to stop building, and in May, Rampling indicated to the Surveyor General that Thomas Ryan was endeavouring to have him removed from the property. He was ordered to quit in August. In 1825 the Surveyor John Oxley claimed that "Hawkins never had any claim to the allotment in Harrington Street but that it was unauthorizedly taken possession of by a convict named Rampling". It was said Rampling had made an application for the property but was refused because he was a prisoner of the Crown. Hawkins, "a mere instrument in the hands of Rampling," applied for the lease although, as Oxley points out, he had no claim for it. The legacy of Rampling's brief occupancy was the (uncompensated) construction of a two-storey stone house / shop with bakehouse attached.

In December 1825, Thomas Ryan, representing John Gleeson, brought a case against Rampling in the Supreme Court to have him removed from the property. The judge found in favour of Ryan. Writing 12 years later, Rampling stated that "it was proved that Gleeson had a lease for twenty-one years of the said allotment previous to the grant to Hawkins and I was subsequently ejected". The property title first records its lessee as John Gleeson, given a twenty-one-year lease for 3 June 1823 over the property bounded by Argyle and Harrington Streets, Harrington Lane (Suez Canal) and Greenway's property to the east. This, therefore, included the site of 28-32 Harrington Street.

Gleeson and Ryan were Tipperary men when they were transported as convicts, arriving in 1817. By the time of the case against Rampling, Gleeson had transferred the property to Ryan. Rampling wrote to the Colonial Secretary in 1827, questioning the leases, "How or in what manner these leases has been obtained is very mysterious".

In 1830 Ryan disposed of the Argyle / Harrington Street properties. Reynolds' Cottages' site was subdivided and sold to William Reynolds, a convict blacksmith also arriving in 1817. The corner block, including the house, was sold to Fredrick Unwin. Unwin leased the house on the site to Caleb Salter, who received a licence to operate the 'King's Head' in 1830. He held the licence to operate the hotel in what appears to be the same building built by Rampling until at least 1837. By 1834 Salter had acquired the freehold of the property and plans indicate it had been extended to the east, attaining a ground plan similar to the current structure; later plans indicate the extension to be a single storey.

=== Conversion as a hotel ===
Continuing the tradition of contesting the site's ownership, in 1841, it was awarded to Rosetta Terry, and it continued to be known as the 'King's Head'. In 1845 the Sydney Municipal Rate Books record the property being owned by Rosetta Terry and Matthew Brown as the tenant. The premises is recorded as a house, but a map of 1844 indicates the building was an inn called the "Kings Head Inn". The place is described as two storey with seven rooms, built from stone with a shingle roof. From 1845 until at least 1861, it was called the "Rose and Crown".

The Rate Book of 1856 indicates that the single-storey shops to 41 & 43 Argyle Street were built during this year. The shops were constructed of stone, brick and wooden walls with a timber shingled roof. The shop in the most easterly portion of the place pulled down and new ones erected by 1877. By 1865 in the Sands Directory, the place is called the Argyle Hotel, and in 1868 the name British Seamen's Hotel appears with Mary Wormleighten manageress. The proprietor William Reilly owned the property until c. 1885 when he sold it to graziers John and William Gill.

=== Ownership by the Gill family ===
The new proprietors were responsible in 1886 for creating the existing building. Interestingly the floor plans of the old hotel and the new building closely correspond. The new building included two shops built to the east along the Argyle Street frontage; this formalised an earlier arrangement of two timber shops previously constructed on the property in this area and let. In 1899, the Hotel's name was changed from British Seamen's Hotel to Hughes's Family Hotel and was also known as McCarthy's Hotel in the 1920s.

=== Resumption by the NSW Government ===
The property was released to the Crown in 1903. The former Hotel was used as a public house/hotel up until around 1925–27, and in 1928 the building was changed to a residential use, a boarding house. There appears to have been few changes to the building during this time. The former Hotel's use remained residential up to 1955 when it was converted into an office with staff amenities for Thomas Playfair Pty Ltd, a major meat export company at the time. In 1970, the control of the property passed to the Sydney Cove Redevelopment Authority. The property continued to be let for various uses until major conservation work was undertaken of the exterior and interior of the building in 1995.

In 1995–96, the Sydney Cove Authority undertook the full conservation of the exterior and the interior of the former hotel. Based on physical evidence, wallpapers, paint schemes, tiles, joinery and door and window hardware were reproduced for the building to interpret it as a hotel operating during the 1890s. In 1996 the refurbishment of the building won the National Trust Energy Australia Heritage Week Awards for the Interior. It has had a range of tenants since then and currently houses a boutique bar.

== Description ==
The north elevation faces Argyle Street and has been designed in the Federation Free Classical style. The elevations are highly decorative with rendered horizontal banding, stone detailing, arched windows with leadlight panels and parapet wall. The western elevation faces Harrington Street and is similar but narrower to the north elevation. The eastern elevation adjoins 45 Argyle Street (c. 1840s), and the southern elevation adjoins 30 Harrington Street (c. 1830s); both are in painted face brick.

The building is divided into two distinct parts. One is a single storey retail outlet on the ground floor and the other, the former hotel, is on two levels. The hotel consisted of 13 rooms, two WCs, a basement which is accessed from the ground floor street corner room and serviced from Argyle Street and a private rear courtyard. The interiors of the former hotel are highly ornate.

Extensive conservation work was undertaken on the building in 1995-96, and its condition is excellent.

== Heritage listing ==
The former British Seamens Hotel and site are of State heritage significance for their historical and scientific cultural values. The site and building are also of State heritage significance for their contribution to The Rocks area which is of State Heritage significance in its own right. Its listing on both the non-statutory heritage register of the National Trust of Australia and the (now defunct) Register of the National Estate demonstrate the esteem the building is held in by the wider community. Development on the site is representative of the historical phases from 1788 to the present day. Initially the site was located in the grounds of the Assistant Surgeon and Hospital gardens. Therefore, it has strong historical associations with the first hospital and especially the first Assistant Surgeon, Dr Redfern. It also has strong associations with other prominent people such as Francis Greenway, colonial architect (1816-1822) and later Rosetta Terry, wife of Samuel Terry.

It is the site of one of the earlier inns in the Rocks – dating from the 1830s. This use remained without interruption until the late 1920s. The place demonstrates various phases of hotel, residential and commercial related activities that formed a major component of the historical, social, cultural and architectural development of the Rocks. It is representative of a type of building traditionally associated with a meeting place and abode for working men within the traditional mixed residential, commercial, industrial and maritime uses of The Rocks area. The site's association with hotel activity lasted almost 100 years. This began with the early development of the Colony and reflected the social pastime of the local community and transient maritime workers. It is reasonable to assume that the former hotel had a strong social link with British Seamen due to its former name the British Seamen's Hotel, which first appeared in 1868 and continued until 1899. The changing social patterns and lifestyles are reflected in the change of use for the building. The residential and commercial activities changed in The Rocks reflecting the area's changing association with the wharves. In the late 1920s the building was converted for residential use as a boarding house. In the mid 1950s it was converted to commercial use.

The building allows social and cultural changes to be interpreted. It has historical significance in allowing the Rocks Resumption Act to be interpreted. It allows interpretation of earlier structures and architectural solutions to later alterations and additions. It is associated with the increased importance of Argyle Street with construction of the Argyle Cut. It is representative of early subdivision and development patterns and later consolidation patterns. Ownership of the site was contested by several people, illustrating the problems associated with the granting of land and leases and recording of such.

The place located on the corner of Argyle and Harrington Streets can be viewed from a distance and forms an important link between the earlier 19th century buildings on the adjoining boundaries. The building before its 1880s alterations was of a similar nature to the adjoining buildings which are of a Colonial Georgian style, providing a contrast with the ornate form of the site. The alterations reflect the changing architectural styles that were favoured at the time. The form, scale and detailing on the place contributes to the historical streetscape. - The well designed, street facades on the former hotel and shops are very good examples of Federation Free Classical Style. It allows interpretation of the operations of an early hotel and shop. The site has been the subject of a limited archaeological investigation. This identified the rich archaeological resource still remaining on site. Therefore, the site has significant research potential as an archaeological resource which can inform about the former buildings and usage of the site as well as the changing lifestyles of its inhabitants.

British Seamen's Hotel was listed on the New South Wales State Heritage Register on 10 May 2002 having satisfied the following criteria.

The place is important in demonstrating the course, or pattern, of cultural or natural history in New South Wales.

Historically the site has had a long association with the social, cultural and maritime development of The Rocks. Initially the site was located in the grounds of the Assistant Surveyor and Hospital gardens. Located on the corner of Argyle and Harrington Streets the site was near the wharves. The first record of an inn on the site dates from the 1830s (the Kings Head Inn). This use remained without interruption until the late 1920s. The site has strong historical associations with the first hospital and especially the first Assistant Surgeon Dr Redfern. It also has strong associations with other prominent people such as Francis Greenway, colonial architect (1816-1822) and later Rosetta Terry, wife of Samuel Terry. The Construction of the Argyle Cut in the mid 1840s allowed direct access between Millers Point and The Rocks, thus increasing the importance of Argyle Street. The site has strong associations with the early grants and subsequent developments on the site. Ownership of the site was contested by several people illustrating the problems associated with the granting of land and leases and recording of such.

It is the site of one of the earlier inns in the Rocks - dating from the 1830s. It is representative of commercial development in the Rocks. The site has an association with Dr Redfern, Francis Greenway and with early land holder Rosetta Terry. It allows social and cultural changes to be interpreted. It has historical significance in allowing the Rocks Resumption Act to be interpreted. It allows interpretation of earlier structures and architectural solutions to later alterations and additions. It is associated with the increased importance of Argyle Street with construction of the Argyle Cut. It is representative of early subdivision and development patterns and later consolidation patterns.

The place has a strong or special association with a person, or group of persons, of importance of cultural or natural history of New South Wales's history.

The site has strong associations with several prominent people, including Dr Redfern, the first Assistant Surgeon in the colony. Francis Greenway lived on part of the site and hotly contested ownership of the entire site. Rosetta Terry, wife of Samuel Terry owned the site when it became a hotel. The site has strong associations with the early grants and subsequent developments on the site. Ownership of the site was contested by several people illustrating the problems associated with the granting of land and leases and recording of such.

The place is important in demonstrating aesthetic characteristics and/or a high degree of creative or technical achievement in New South Wales.

The place located on the corner of Argyle and Harrington Streets can be viewed from a distance and forms an important link between the earlier 19th century buildings on the adjoining boundaries. The building before its 1880s alterations was of a similar nature to the adjoining buildings which are of a Colonial Georgian style, providing a contrast with the ornate form of the site. The alterations reflect the changing architectural styles that were favoured at the time. The form, scale and detailing on the place contributes to the historical streetscape. - The well designed, street facades on the Former Hotel and shops are very good examples of Federation Free Classical Style.

The place has a strong or special association with a particular community or cultural group in New South Wales for social, cultural or spiritual reasons.

The site's association with hotel activity lasted almost 100 years. This began with the early development of the Colony and reflected the social pastime of the local community and transient maritime workers. It is reasonable to assume that the former hotel had a strong social link with British Seamen due to its former name the British Seamen's Hotel, which first appeared in 1868 and continued until 1899. The changing social patterns and lifestyles are reflected in the change of use for the building. The residential and commercial activities changed in The Rocks reflecting the area's changing association with the wharves. In the late 1920s the building was converted for residential use of a boarding house. In the mid 1950s it was converted to commercial use.

The place has potential to yield information that will contribute to an understanding of the cultural or natural history of New South Wales.

The site has been the subject of a limited archaeological investigation. This identified the rich archaeological resource still remaining on site. Therefore, the site has significant research potential as an archaeological resource which can inform about the former buildings and usage of the site as well as the changing lifestyles of its inhabitants.

The place possesses uncommon, rare or endangered aspects of the cultural or natural history of New South Wales.

The subject place is a rare example of a Federation Free Classical style pub/hotel in The Rocks area.

The place is important in demonstrating the principal characteristics of a class of cultural or natural places/environments in New South Wales.

The former British Seamen's Hotel is the site of one of the earliest inns in The Rocks dating from the 1830s. It is representative of commercial development in The Rocks. It allows social and cultural changes to be interpreted. It has historical significance in allowing The Rocks Resumption Act to be interpreted. It allows interpretation of earlier structures and architectural solutions to later alterations and additions. It is representative of early subdivision and development patterns and later consolidation patterns. The former British Seamen's Hotel is representative of a type of building traditionally associated with a meeting place and abode for working men within the traditional mixed residential, commercial, industrial and maritime uses of The Rocks area. Development on the site is representative of the historical phases from 1788 to the present day. The former British Seamen's Hotel is a representative example of a prominent corner building design from the 1880s and is a fine example of its type. Aesthetically, the subject place is a significant variation to the other pubs/hotels of the same era built in The Rocks area.
