= Lavinia (1815 ship) =

UK merchant ship (1815–1822)

History

United Kingdom
- Name: Lavinia
- Launched: 1815, Sunderland
- Fate: Wrecked and condemned July 1822

General characteristics
- Tons burthen: 233 (bm)
- Sail plan: Snow

Lavinia was a merchant ship launched at Sunderland in 1815. She traded widely until a gale at the Cape of Good Hope in July 1822 wrecked her.

== Career ==
Lavinia first appeared in Lloyd's Register (LR) in 1815.

Year	Master	Owner	Trade	Source
1815	A.Keith	[At] Sunderland	Bristol–New York	LR
1818	A.Keith	J.Brown	London–Trieste	LR

On 5 April 1818 Lavinia, Keith, master, arrived in the Thames. She had been coming from Hamburg when she had temporarily grounded on the Mouse Sand and had to throw part of her cargo overboard to get free.

Year	Master	Owner	Trade	Source
1821	A.Keith	J.Brown	London–Rio de Janeiro	LR
1822	A.Keith	J.Brown	London–Rio de Janeiro; London–Cape of Good Hope	LR

== Fate ==
Lavinia, Keith, master, arrived at the Cape of Good Hope on 30 June 1822. She was one of several vessels caught there in a gale on 21 July, including Olive Branch, Adriatic, Leander, and Sun, and Royal George, most of which were lost.

Lavinia was driven ashore at Table Bay. She was condemned as a constructive total loss and sold for breaking up.
