= Sun (1819 ship) =

History

United Kingdom
- Name: Sun
- Builder: Oswald Partis, Sunderland
- Launched: 1819
- Fate: Condemned August 1822; Finally wrecked May 1826

General characteristics
- Tons burthen: 185 (bm)
- Sail plan: Brig

Sun was a brig built in 1819 at Sunderland and was condemned at the Cape of Good Hope (the Cape) in August 1822. She was repaired and began sailing east of the Cape. She was wrecked in May 1826 in the Torres Strait.

== Career ==
Sun first appeared in Lloyd's Register (LR) in the 1820 volume.

Year	Master	Owner	Trade	Source
1820	G.Murray	J.Hay	London-Riga	LR
1823	G.Murray	J.Hay	London-CGH	LR

On 21–22 July 1822 a tremendous gale drove Sun, mastered by Murray, ashore at the Cape of Good Hope. She had been nearly loaded for London. A letter dated 10 August stated that the greater part of Sun's cargo had been saved, but that she had been condemned. (Note: The same storm also resulted in the loss of other ships, including Adriatic, Leander, and Olive Branch, and damage to Royal George.)

The next report was that it was expected that Sun would be recovered from the shore. After being condemned, Sun was thus sold, repaired, and fitted out. She was expected to sail to Bengal under the name George Ballard. There is no further mention in online resources of the George Ballard.

Instead, Sun retained her name and continued to sail, but trading as a country ship, i.e., east of the Cape. She was registered at the Cape in 1823, and may later have transferred her registry to Calcutta, though she does not appear in an 1825 list of vessels registered there. (Note: LR continued to carry Sun for several years with details unchanged from 1823.)

Sun, with Anderson as master, arrived in Bengal on 2 March 1823 from the Cape of Good Hope. She returned to the Cape on 19 November. On 1 February 1824 Sun, under master Griffiths, sailed from the Cape for Bengal. She arrived there on 21 May.

She sailed with a cargo of tea from Canton, China on 28 November 1825 to Van Diemens Land. Leaving the River Derwent on 16 March 1826, she sailed to Sydney arriving on 24 March.

== Loss ==
Under the command of Captain W. Gillett, on 11 May 1826 Sun left on a voyage from Sydney to Batavia. On the way she struck a reef off Eastern Fields, north-east of Thursday Island, and was wrecked with the loss of 24 of the 36 people on board. (Note: The dead included the first and second officers, and 22 lascars. Captain Gillett and the survivors were in the ship's jolly boat. By another account the second officer was the only man to drown.) The survivors made for Murray Island, where the vessels John Munro and Industry rescued them. The brig was reported to be carrying 40,000 Spanish dollars.

One contemporary newspaper report had Sun in company with Venus, Killgour, master, and both being wrecked. The account states that Industry rescued the crews of both Venus and Sun. By other accounts, Venus was wrecked on 1 July 1826 on the Alerts Reef where Security rescued her crew.
