= 95–99 George Street, The Rocks =

95-99 George Street, The Rocks
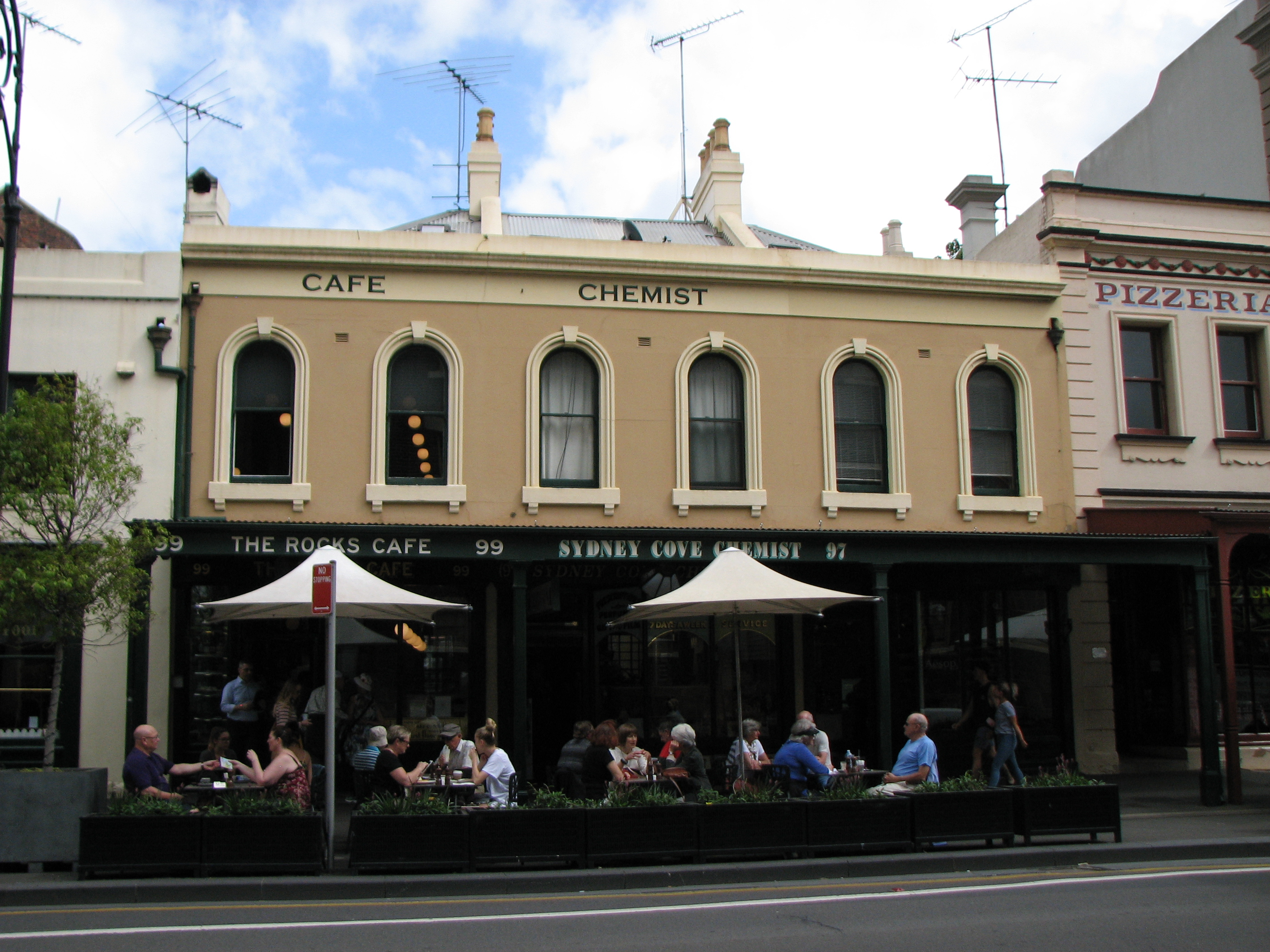
- 95-99 George Street, The Rocks

- Location within Sydney Location within Australia
- 33.8595°S 151.2085°E
- Location: 95-99 George Street, The Rocks, City of Sydney, New South Wales, Australia

History
- Built: 1868

Site notes
- Architectural style: Victorian Italianate
- Owner: Property NSW

New South Wales Heritage Register
- Official name: Shops and Residences, Terrace; residential above
- Type: State heritage (built)
- Designated: 10 May 2002
- Reference no.: 1596
- Type: Shop
- Category: Retail and Wholesale

95-99 George Street, The Rocks are heritage-listed shops and cafe and former dwellings located at 95-99 George Street in the inner city Sydney suburb of The Rocks in the City of Sydney local government area of New South Wales, Australia. It was built from 1868 to 1868. The property is owned by Property NSW, an agency of the Government of New South Wales. It was added to the New South Wales State Heritage Register on 10 May 2002.

== History ==
The subject site has been in continuous European usage since c. 1788 as it was part of the first hospital grounds. The hospital stood just to the south of the site and the residence and garden of the assistant surgeon covered part of the site. The hospital was relocated to Macquarie Street in 1816 when the Rum Hospital opened. The Assistant Surgeon's residence was occupied by Francis Greenway, the convict architect who had been transported for forging a building contract in 1814.

Greenway was appointed civil architect by Governor Macquarie in 1816, part of his salary included lodgings. After Macquarie left the colony and Governor Brisbane took over, Greenway was retained as a government employee, but was dismissed in 1822. When the appointment ceased, Greenway refused to relinquish the residence, saying that Macquarie had promised to grant him the land and buildings. The Government tried every legal means to remove Greenway, but he finally produced a document which gave him title to the house. This document has since been suspected to be a forgery.

Following the death of his wife, Mary, in 1832, Greenway sold portion of the property with the residence to Frederick Wright Unwin for £150. The right of The Crown to the land continued to be contested by the Government and Unwin settled the matter in 1835 by agreeing to pay the Crown £2,870 for the title. Greenway remained in the house until he was forcibly evicted in July 1836. Unwin was finally confirmed with title to the land in 1838.

In July 1839 Unwin leased the land to Michael Gannon on the express condition that he develop it, the lease agreement required that Gannon:

'shall and will within a reasonable time and within two years at the furthest build and erect on the line of frontage to George St as many houses as will occupy the said frontage of such dimensions as said Michael Gannon may think fit so as such houses are of three stories exclusive of cellars and built substantially and of good materials.'

A plan of Gannon's 1844 lease shows that by that time he had erected a number of buildings fronting George and Argyle Streets, including the New York Hotel at 91 George Street, his own business premises at 43-45 Argyle Street and three shops on the subject site. The rate assessments indicate the buildings were three storey shops with dwellings, brick or stone construction and of eight rooms. In the same year Gannon took out a mortgage with Joseph Samuel Hanson and was insolvent by 1847, forcing him to sell the leasehold to Hanson. Unwin, the holder of the freehold title was also in financial trouble and also declared insolvency in 1847. The title to the property was purchased by two investors, Robert Archibald Morehead and Mathew Young, in 1844 for £2,300.

In 1861, for an unknown reason, the buildings at 95-99 George Street were vacated and the buildings demolished. The land remained vacant until c. 1867 when the present building was constructed, possibly to a pattern book design, by William Bradridge. Bradridge placed an add for tenders from bricklayers for three shops and dwellings in George Street North in The Sydney Morning Herald in February 1867 which may relate to the construction of the subject buildings.

By 1868, Gannon's assignment of the lease to Hanson had expired and the subsequent lease arrangements have not been located. In 1870, Moorehead and Young sold the land to William Yeoman, a painter who already occupied the premises at 97 George Street. As a lengthy gap frequently occurred in the 19th century between effectively taking ownership of land and having the change of ownership registered with the Government, it is possible that Yeoman took over the land and caused the improvements to be carried out prior to officially having the land conveyed to him.

The council rates of 1871 describe the new terrace of shops and dwellings as each of two storeys of five rooms of brick construction with an iron roof. They were occupied by 1868, with a butcher in No. 95 and a grocer in No. 99, these buildings continued to be used for those businesses for the next 20 years. Yeoman remained in No. 97 until 1873. In 1885 Yeoman sold the property to grazier John Gill of Moonbi for £9,000, an amount inflated by the financial boom of the time. Gill also acquired most of the land in the block bounded by George, Argyle and Harrington Streets and Suez Canal.

Following the outbreak of the Bubonic plague in Sydney in 1900, the property, along with the rest of The Rocks and Millers Point was resumed by the Government. Following this resumption the Maritime Services Board administered the properties until ownership was taken over by the Sydney Cove Redevelopment Authority.

The shop at No. 95 was Thomas Claydon's butcher from 1868 until 1902, then Joseph Brigg's butchery until 1908. The cool room in the cellar from this early use of the building still remains. A clothier, initially Cohen Bros, then later Abraham Cliffe replaced the butchery and Cliffe continued to trade there until 1922. After this the shop became a grocer until the 1950s. Of the three shops No. 97 had the most varied occupation history, tenants including Yeoman, a painter, then a fishmonger, restaurant, hairdresser and bird dealer occupied the premises for almost 30 years until 1906. Between 1923 and 1931 the Empire Service Club had a reading room in No. 97. This club was formed by the ANZAC Fellowship of Women under Dr Mary Booth's leadership in 1923 as a welfare organisation for boys brought to Australia to train as farm labourers under the "Dreadnought scheme" between 1911 and 1939.

99 George Street was continually used as a grocers and run by a number of tenants until the 1970s. In 1970 control of the land was vested in the Sydney Cove Redevelopment Authority (SCRA). The commercial use of the buildings has continued, however they no longer have a residential component. In the late 1970s and early 1980s the SCRA undertook restoration and reconstruction works on the terrace of shops. As at 2008, the shops were occupied by The Rocks Café, the Sydney Cove Pharmacy and the Sydney Cove Newsagency.

Archaeology notes: Assistant Surgeon's residence from c. 1790-1815. The current structure was built in 1868, replacing a row of houses which occupied the site from c. 1845-1863. No. 95 has served as a newsagency since c. 1930s.

== Description ==
Nos. 95-99 George Street comprises a row of three two storey late Victorian shops in the Victorian Italianate style, with original shop fronts to the ground floor. The façade is stuccoed, with heavily moulded architraves around the first floor windows below a prominent but simple cornice and parapet. The timber windows have single pane sashes within arched openings. A cool room from the late 1800s still survives in the basement of No. 95. No. 99 has a stone basement which may be part of the earlier c.1840 building. In 1985, the timber framed street awnings were reconstructed and a pediment constructed with the date "1868" centred over No. 97 George Street. The rear of the buildings back onto a pedestrian laneway called Greenway Lane.

Style: Victorian Italianate; Storeys: 2; Facade: Stuccoed brick walls; Roof Cladding: Iron; Floor Frame: Timber

=== Condition ===
As at 3 May 2001, Archaeology Assessment Condition: Mostly disturbed. Assessment Basis: Cellars beneath. Floors lower than rear laneway. Investigation: Site survey

=== Modifications and dates ===
- By 1958 – Awnings to George Street removed, replaced by a removable canvas sun blind.
- Late 1970s & 1980s – Program of restoration and reconstruction undertaken by SCRA.
- 1985 – Reconstruction of awnings and construction of pediment with "1868" centred over No. 97.

== Heritage listing ==
As at 26 June 2002, the site and buildings at 95-99 George St, The Rocks, are of heritage significance for the State of NSW for their aesthetic, historical and scientific cultural values, and for its contribution to The Rocks area.

Nos. 95-99 George Street are excellent examples of 1860s terrace shops and residences in the Victorian Italianate style, located within the main commercial precinct of The Rocks. The extant structures, constructed c. 1867, retain a substantial degree of building fabric which demonstrates the architectural practice of the era, including timber framed glazed shop fronts and entrance doors. They are of historic significance as a site continuously used for retail and residential purposes since their construction in 1867. Nos. 95 and 97 contain highly intact shop interiors from the Victorian period, rare in NSW context. The near continuous occupation of No. 99 by grocers/fruiterers up to c.1980 is historically noteworthy.

The buildings form an integral part of what was the major commercial centre of the colony, which has continued in the same use to the present day. As a group, the shops along the western side of George street have a landmark streetscape value, providing a strong architectural statement on the major entry into The Rocks. While differing in style, the buildings are sympathetic in materials and scale and form a unified visual precinct, and make a major contribution to the significance of The Rocks Conservation Area.

The sites have strong associations with former uses and owners including the early penal hospital, the house inhabited by Francis Greenway, and stores erected c.1840 by local builder, Michael Gannon. The sites have archaeological potential to reveal evidence of the previous structures and uses of the site from the early days of the settlement. All have cellars, probably dating from the 1840s. This row of shops and residences are of State heritage significance for their historical and scientific cultural values. The site and buildings are also of State heritage significance for their contribution to The Rocks area which is of State Heritage significance in its own right.

The site has scientific significance for the archaeological potential to reveal evidence of earlier buildings on the site including the c. 1788 Assistant Surgeons residence and the 1840s shop buildings. The cool room in the cellar of No. 95 is a rare industrial archaeological resource for understanding early means of refrigeration.

Shops and Residences, Terrace was listed on the New South Wales State Heritage Register on 10 May 2002 having satisfied the following criteria.

The place is important in demonstrating the course, or pattern, of cultural or natural history in New South Wales.

The site of 95-99 George Street is historically significant as a site continuously occupied since 1788. The configuration of the building and Greenway Lane is historically significant is demonstrating the approach to urban planning prevalent in The Rocks c. 1840. The original building at 95-99 George Street was constructed contemporaneously with the buildings at 45-47 Argyle Street and 91-93 George Street, imparting this group of buildings with a shared origin and history. The present boundaries or the site relate to the 1840s development.

The current building at 95-99 George Street was constructed in 1867, and was one of the second generation of buildings to be built along George Street. It is an interesting reflection of the 19th century approach to town improvements in its quality of design and construction and the provision of shopkeepers' dwellings above individual shop fronts.

95 and 97 George Street are significant for their continual occupation and use as ordinary (non-tourist) shops, a type once dominant in The Rocks area.

95-99 George Street meets this criterion on a local level.

The place has a strong or special association with a person, or group of persons, of importance of cultural or natural history of New South Wales's history.

The site of 95-99 George Street is of significance for its association with the First Fleet, as the site of the house of the Assistant Surgeon from c. 1788. The Assistant Surgeon's residence is also associated with the first colonial architect, Francis Greenway who lived in the house between 1815 and c. 1834. The original building on the site, although demolished and rebuilt in 1867, is associated with Michael Gannon, a ticket of leave convict who made a living as a builder in The Rocks, developing a substantial parcel of land, including the subject site, from 1839. Gannon is an interesting example of the mid 19th century class of pardoned convicts who remained in NSW and practiced trades or professions The building is also associated with a number of former owners and occupants of note, including Fredric Wright Unwin, William Yeoman and long-term resident Thomas Claydon. 95-99 George Street meets this criterion on a State level.

The place is important in demonstrating aesthetic characteristics and/or a high degree of creative or technical achievement in New South Wales.

95-99 George Street is aesthetically significant as a find example of Victorian Italianate style, characterised by the moulded parapet and elaborate first floor window architraves and ground floor glazed timber shopfronts with recessed entrances. 95 and 97 George Street are aesthetically significant for containing some of the most intact Victorian period interiors for shops and residences in The Rocks area, including internal linings, joinery, some door and window furniture and an original plan form. 95-99 George Street makes an important contribution to the streetscape of George St, and is of significance in continuing the uniform character of the small scale retail shop buildings found in The Rocks. The building is aesthetically significant for its contribution to the streetscape of Greenway Lane, one of the pedestrian laneways in The Rocks area which are highly significant as evocation of the colonial townscape. 95-99 George Street meets this criterion on a State level.

The place has a strong or special association with a particular community or cultural group in New South Wales for social, cultural or spiritual reasons.

The site is socially significant for its long history of continues occupation and residential use. Live-in shopkeepers are increasingly rare in The Rocks and this use is representative of what was once dominant in the social fabric of the area. 95-99 George Street is socially significant for its long history and for its contribution to The Rocks area, Australia's premier heritage precinct, as evidenced by its inclusion on a number of lists of buildings of heritage significance formulated by community groups such as the National Trust and representative bodies such as the City of Sydney Council and the Heritage Council of NSW.

As part of The Rocks area, 95-99 George Street is likely to be held in some esteem by the individuals and groups who are interested in Sydney's history and heritage. 95-99 George Street, as part of The Rocks precinct, meets this criterion on a State level.

The place has potential to yield information that will contribute to an understanding of the cultural or natural history of New South Wales.

The site is technically significant for the archaeological potential to reveal evidence of earlier configurations of the hotel structures and road surfaces as well as the c. 1788 structure occupied by the First Fleet's Assistant Surgeon and later by Francis Greenway. The cool room, located in the basement of 95 George Street, built in 1867 for Thomas Claydon, the first lessee, is highly significant for it intactness. It demonstrates the early and long term use of the building as a butcher shop and has the potential to yield information regarding the history of refrigeration in Australia.

95-99 George Street meets this criterion on a State level.

The place possesses uncommon, rare or endangered aspects of the cultural or natural history of New South Wales.

95-99 George is an example of the large number of Victorian period retail shops in The Rocks with continued ordinary (i.e. non-tourist) retail and residential uses. 95-99 George Street is rare for the quantity of original fabric which is retained intact. Nos. 95 and 97 are among the most intact mid-Victorian shops in Sydney. The cool room in No. 95 George Street is rare as an intact example of 19th century refrigeration, built prior to the availability of mechanical means of cooling. 95-99 George Street meets this criterion on a State level.

The place is important in demonstrating the principal characteristics of a class of cultural or natural places/environments in New South Wales.

95-99 George Street is a rare example of a Victorian Italianate style terrace of three retail shops in The Rocks of similar fabric, size and use (with residences above the shops). 95-99 George Street meets this criterion on a local level.

== See also ==
- Australian residential architectural styles
- 93 George Street
- 101 George Street
