= Venus (1807 ship) =

History

United Kingdom
- Builder: Île de France, or India
- Launched: 1807, or 1804
- Fate: Wrecked 1 July 1826

General characteristics
- Tons burthen: 158, or 169, or 190 (bm)
- Sail plan: Snow
- Armament: 1809:2 × 4-pounder guns + 8 × 12-pounder carronades; 1815:2 × 4-pounder guns

Venus was built in Mauritius in 1807. She spent most of her career sailing between London and the Cape of Good Hope (CGH). She also sailed to Mauritius, sailing under a licence from the British East India Company (EIC). She wrecked in July 1826 while sailing from Sydney to Singapore.

== Career ==
Venus first appeared in the Register of Shipping (RS) and Lloyd's Register (LR) in 1809, with essentially the same information. LR gave her launch year as 1804 and her origin as India, while RS gave no launch year but gave her origin as Île de France (Mauritius). Some years later RS gave her launch year as 1807.

Year	Master	Owner	Trade	Source
1809	B.Bunn; C.Allen	H.Howten	London–Madeira; London–CGH	RS
1810	C.Allum; Allarlet	Houghton; H.Hart	London–CGH; London–Mediterranean	RS
1811	Alariot; Kilgour	Hart; H.Howton	London–Mediterranean; London–CGH	RS
1815	Kilgour	Atkinson	London–CGH	RS
1820	Kilgour	Captain & Co.	London–CGH	RS; large repair 1813

In 1813 the British EIC had lost its monopoly on the trade between India and Britain. British ships were then free to sail to India or the Indian Ocean under a licence from the EIC.

On 22 May 1824 Venus arrived at the Cape. She had left Mauritius on 19 April. She reported that while she was at Mauritius there were two hurricanes, one on 23 February and one on 10 April.

Year	Master	Owner	Trade	Source
1824	Kilgour; Sharp	Captain & Co.	London–CGH	RS; large repair 1813 & 1812
1825	Sharp; Kilgour	Captain & Co. Houghton	London–CGH	Register of Shipping; large repair 1813

On 1 January 1825 Captain G. Kilgower sailed from London for Ceylon.

In early 1826 she had arrived at Sydney from the Cape of Good Hope. She then traded between Sydney and Hobart.

== Fate ==
Venus, Kilgour, master, sailed from Sydney on 21 June 1826. She was wrecked on Alert Reef, about 400 miles east of Cairns. She was wrecked on 1 July 1826 in Torres Strait on her passage to Singapore. 'Lloyd's List reported that Venus had sailed from Sydney for Singapore and had wrecked on the Alerts Reef in the Torris Straits.

Venus was in company with Security, Ross, master, and Greenock, Miller, master. When Venus struck the reef Kilgour fired her guns, enabling the other two masters to avoid Venus's fate. Security rescued the crew and passengers from Venus and brought them to Batavia, where they arrived on 4 August.

One contemporary newspaper report had Venus in company with Sun, Gillett, master, and both being wrecked. Sun was reportedly carrying 40,000 dollars. The account states that Industry rescued the crews of both Venus and Sun. Sun was wrecked on Flinders' Eastern Field Reef in the approaches to Torres Strait, on 28 May 1826.
