= Richmond (1811 ship) =

History

United Kingdom
- Name: Richmond
- Owner: 1812:Sedgewick; 1822:D. Johnstone
- Builder: Itchenor, Chichester
- Launched: 1811
- Fate: Wrecked 31 July 1822

General characteristics
- Tons burthen: 46628/94, or 482, or 486 (bm)
- Length: 112 ft 6 in (34.3 m)
- Beam: 31 ft 6 in (9.6 m)
- Propulsion: Sail

Richmond was launched in 1811 as a West Indiaman. She made one voyage for the British East India Company (EIC). She wrecked in 1822 in the Sea of Java.

== Career ==
Richmond entered the Register of Shipping in 1812 with T. Hearn, master, Sedgewick, owner, and trade Portsmouth—West Indies.

Around 26 July 1816 Richmond, Hearn, master, arrived in England. She had left Old Harbour, Jamaica, on 28 May. On 24 June she had boarded the hull of Little Jane, of Baltimore.

On 19 April 1819 Richmond, "Horn", master, was in Colombo Roads when the SW monsoon arrived. She had chain cables and lost 70 fathoms of cable when her windlass broke.

Captain James Kay sailed Richmond from the Downs 25 June 1820, bound for St Helena and Bengal on a voyage as an "extra ship" for the EIC. She reached St Helena on 29 August and arrived at Calcutta on 11 December. Homeward bound, she was at Diamond Harbour on 31 January, Madras on 15 February, and Colombo on 8 March. She left Colombo on 9 April, reached the Cape of Good Hope on 14 June and St Helena on 9 July, and then arrived at her moorings on 28 September.

The Register of Shipping for 1822 carried Richmond with Kays, master, Johnstone, owner, and trade London—New South Wales.

== Fate ==
In July 1822 Richmond was in the Java Sea in company with Almorah, the vessels having sailed from Port Jackson, when Richmond wrecked on Hog Island on 31 July. Almorah picked up Richmond's crew and took them to Batavia, where they arrived on 5 August.
