= Olive Branch (1818 ship) =

British ship

History

United Kingdom
- Name: Olive Branch
- Namesake: Olive branch
- Builder: Thomas White, Cowes
- Launched: 2 May 1818, or 1816
- Fate: Wrecked 21 July 1822; Burnt 6 November 1843

General characteristics
- Tons burthen: 217, or 21758/94 (bm)
- Sail plan: Snow

Olive Branch was launched in 1818 at Cowes. She was one of several vessels that a gale wrecked at the Cape of Good Hope (CGH; the Cape), on 21 July 1822. She returned to service and on some or more of her voyages to the Cape she sailed to Mauritius under a licence from the British East India Company (EIC). She burnt in November 1843 while sailing between Quebec and London.

== Career ==
Olive Branch first entered Lloyd's Register (LR) in 1818.

| Year | Master | Owner | Trade | Source |
|---|---|---|---|---|
| 1818 | Artis; Kind | Brown; Mount | Cowes–Newcastle; London–Hayti | LR |
| 1820 | W.Kind | W.Kind | Cowes; London–CGH | LR |
| 1823 | W.Kind | W.Kind & Co. | London–CGH | LR |

On 1 May 1821 Olive Branch, Kidd, master, arrived at the Cape. On 3 March an unknown ship had run into her a 15°0′S 29°33′W causing damages and carrying away Olive Branch's foremast and bowsprit.

On 21–22 July 1822 a tremendous gale drove Olive Branch, Kind, master, ashore at the Cape of Good Hope. She had been nearly loaded for London. A letter dated 10 August stated that the greater part of Olive Branch's cargo had been saved, but that she had been condemned. The next report was that Olive Branch, Kind, master, had been condemned and sold.

The entry for Olive Branch in the 1823 volume of LR carried the annotation "condemned&sold". The same storm also resulted in the loss of other ships, including Adriatic, Lavinia, Leander, and Sun, and damage to Royal George.

In 1823 Captain James Anderson brought Olive Branch and repaired her.

| Year | Master | Owner | Trade | Source & notes |
|---|---|---|---|---|
| 1825 | Anderson | Captain | London–Cape of Good Hope (CGH) | Register of Sipping (RS) |
| 1826 | Anderson; Murray | Aikin & Co. | London–CGH | LR |
| Anderson | Aikin & Co. | London–CGH | LR | |
| 1832 | Anderson | Phillips | London–CGH | RS; |

Anderson remained master of Olive Branch until he died aboard the vessel on 26 August 1832, whilst on route to Cape Town. He had sailed from London on 25 June 1832, bound for Mauritius and sailing under a licence from the EIC.

| Year | Master | Owner | Trade | Source & notes |
|---|---|---|---|---|
| 1833 | Anderson; Spirling/Shirling | Phillips | London–CGH | RS; small repairs 1827, thorough repair 1832, & small repairs 1833 |
| 1838 | Cousins | Cousins | London–Riga | LR, small repairs 1833 |
| 1839 | Cousins | Cousins | Hull | LR, small repairs 1833 & 1839 |
| 1841 | Cousins | Cousins | Hull; London–Shields; London | LR, small repairs 1833, 1839, & 1842 |
| 1842 | Foster | Foster & Co. | London–Quebec | LR; small repairs 1843 |

== Fate ==
Olive Branch burnt on 6 November 1843 at the mouth of the Saguenay River. She was carrying a cargo of deals. Her crew were saved.
