= Leander (1813 ship) =

History

United Kingdom
- Name: Leander
- Builder: Whitehaven
- Launched: 1813
- Fate: Wrecked and condemned 1822

General characteristics
- Tons burthen: 202 (bm)

Leander was launched at Whitehaven in 1813. Initially she traded as a West Indiaman and then more widely. She was wrecked in July 1822 at the Cape of Good Hope.

== Career ==
Leander first appeared in Lloyd's Register (LR) in 1814 with Middleton, master and owner, and trade Whitehaven–West Indies.

Year	Master	Owner	Trade	Source
1815	Middleton	Middleton	Whitehaven–West Indies	LR
1820	Middleton	Dalgarne & Co.	Liverpool–Jamaica; Liverpool–Brazil	LR
1822	Middleton	Delgroy & Co.	London–Cape of Good Hope	LR

== Fate ==
Leander, Middleton, master, put into Cork on 17 March 1822. She was on her way from London to the Cape of Good Hope, but had sprung her mast.

On 21–22 July 1822 Leander was driven ashore at the Cape of Good Hope. Captain Middleton and a seaman were drowned when the boat they were in overturned as they were leaving the wreck of Leander. A letter dated 10 August reported that the greater part of Leander's cargo had been saved, but that she had been condemned.

The same storm also resulted in the loss of other ships, including Adriatic, Olive Branch, and Sun, and Lavinia, and damage to Royal George.
