= Adriatic (1810 ship) =

History

United Kingdom
- Name: Adriatic
- Namesake: Adriatic
- Builder: Sunderland
- Launched: 1810
- Fate: Wrecked 1822

General characteristics
- Tons burthen: 193 (bm)
- Armament: 1811:6 × 9-pounder carronades; 1815:8 × 9-pounder + 2 × 6-pounder guns

Adriatic was built at Sunderland in 1810. She sailed to the West Indies and the Cape of Good Hope (CGH, or the Cape). There is no evidence that she sailed to India. She was wrecked at the Cape in 1822.

== Career ==
Adriatic first appeared in Lloyd's Register (LR) in 1811 with R. Stamp, master, Moon & Co., owner, and trade London–Rio de Janeiro.

Lloyd's Register and the Register of Shipping (RS) were only as accurate as shipowners chose to keep them. Also, the registers did not publish at exactly the same time, even when publishing for the same year. Consequently, there are frequently discrepancies between them.

Year	Master	Owner	Trade	Source and notes
1811	R. Stamp	Moon & & Co.	London−Rio de Janeiro	LR
1811	R.Stamp	H.Moon	London–Senegal; London–CGH	RS
1815	R. Stamp; W Tremayne	Moon & Co.	Plymouth–CGH	LR; large repairs 1814
1815	Tremayne	R. Winlow	Southampton–Plymouth	RS
1820	Ruther	Capt. & Co.	London–Rio de Janeiro	LR; large repairs 1814 & small repairs 1819
1820	W. Rutter	Rutter	London–Rio de Janeiro	RS

== Fate ==
Adriatic, Rutter, master, sailed from Gravesend on 20 April, bound for the Cape, and arrived there on 14 July. On 21 July a storm drove Adriatic onshore with the loss of a crew member. She was condemned and sold.

The same storm also resulted in the loss of other ships, including Olive Branch, Sun, Lavinia, and Leander, and damage to Royal George.
