= Royal George (1820 ship) =

History

United Kingdom
- Name: Royal George
- Owner: 1820:Joseph Soames; 1830:Moates & Co., London; 1836:Jacob & Co., London.; 1838:Arnold & Co., London.; 1844:G. Marshall & Co., London.
- Builder: James Shepherd, Paul, Hull
- Launched: 11 July 1820

General characteristics
- Tons burthen: Old Act: 486, or 48634/94 (bm); New Act (post 1836): 583(bm)
- Length: 110 ft 4 in (33.6 m)
- Beam: 30 ft 5 in (9.3 m)
- Propulsion: Sail

Royal George was a 486-ton merchant ship built at Hull, England in 1820. Between 1823-4, she undertook one voyage for the British East India Company. Later, she made two voyages transporting convicts from England to Australia.

== Career ==
Initially, Royal George traded with India under a license from the EIC. Royal George first appeared in Lloyd's Register (LR) in 1821 with Bowditch, master, Somes & Co., owner, and trade London–India, changing to London–New South Wales.

On 21 May 1821 Royal George, Captain Bowditch, sailed from London for Fort William, India.

On 21–22 July 1822 a gale drove Royal George, Captain Powditch, coming from Van Diemen's Land, ashore at the Cape of Good Hope. (Note: The same storm also resulted in the loss of other ships, including Adriatic, Leander, Olive Branch, Lavinia, and Sun.) Royal George was refloated on 20 August.

EIC voyage (1823-4): Captain William Reynolds left the Downs on 17 June 1823, bound for Bengal and Madras. Royal George reached the Cape of Good Hope on 8 September, and Diamond Harbour on 11 November, before arriving at Calcutta on 20 November. Homeward bound, she was at Kedgeree on 7 January 1824. She then stopped at Vizagapatam (11 January), Masulipatam (18 January), and Madras (22 January). She reached Point de Galle on 11 February and St Helena on 16 April, before arriving at the Downs on 17 June.

First convict voyage (1828): Captain Robert Embledon and surgeon William Gregor departed Spithead on 26 August 1828 and arrived in Sydney on 24 December 1828. She embarked 160 male convicts; there were two convict deaths en route.

Second convict voyage (1830): Captain Embledon and surgeon Michael Goodsir departed Portsmouth on 27 June 1830 and arrived in Hobart Town on 18 October. She embarked 215 male convicts. She and had four convict deaths en route. She then sailed to Sydney with a number of convicts.

Between 1835 and 1860 Royal George was a general trader to India, the Far East, and Australia.

In 1844 she transported 21 exiles from HM Prison Pentonville, England, to Williamstown, Port Phillip. She arrived there on 11 November 1844.

Year	Master	Owner	Trade	Homeport	Source & notes
1845	T.Grieves	Marshall	London–Port Philip; London–Sydney	London	LR; thorough repair 1838 & small repair 1844
1850	T.Grieves	Marshall	London–Port Philip	London	LR; small repairs in 1847 & 1849
1855		Marshall	London	London	LR; small repairs in 1849 & 1853
1860	W.Tait	Wilson & Co.	Shields–Cape of Good Hope	Shields	LR; small repairs in 1853, 1857, & 1859

== Fate ==
In 1860 her owners sold her as a hulk or to be broken up. Royal George was no longer listed in the 1861 volume of LR.
