= Australian Hotel =

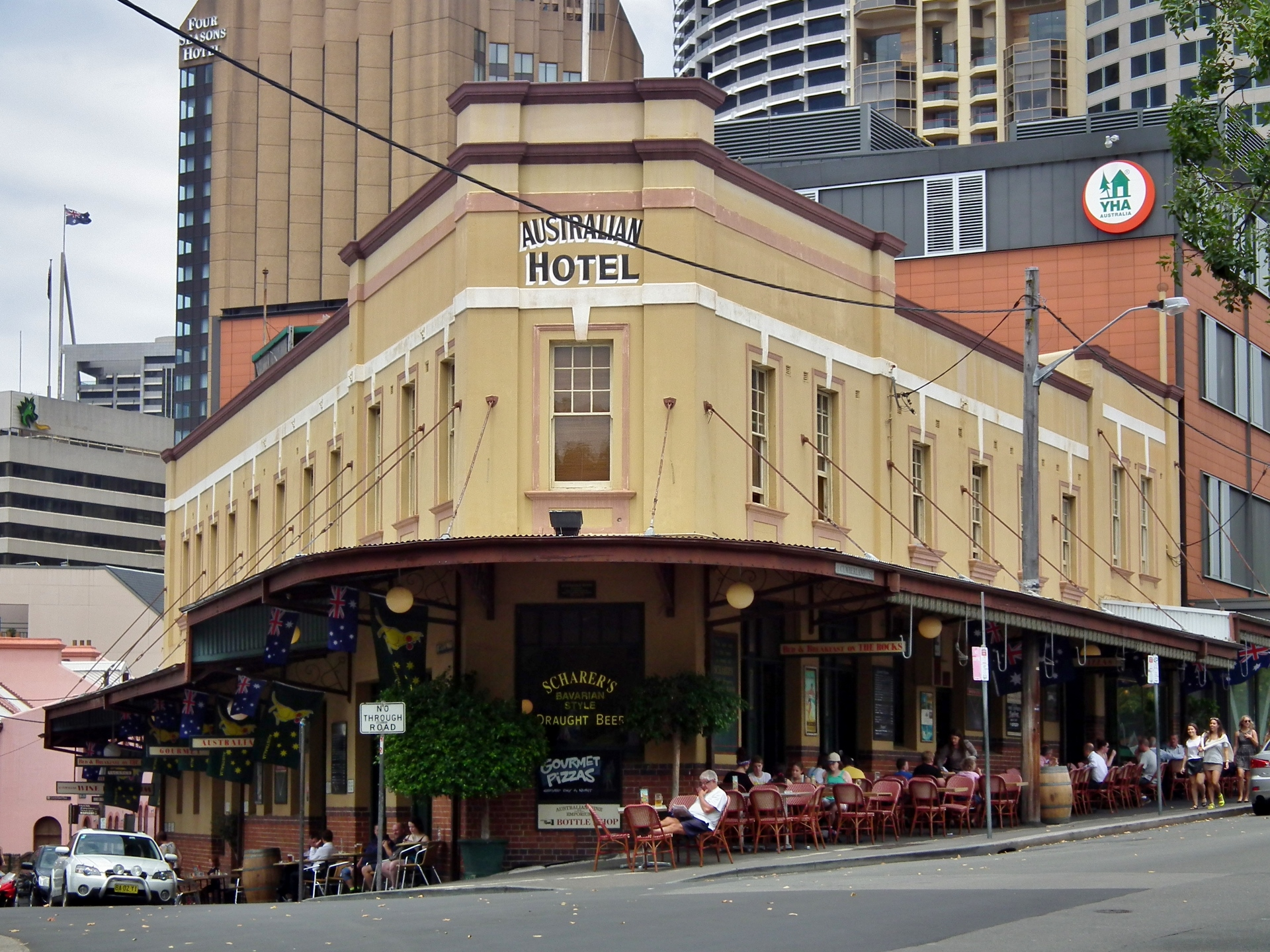
- The Australian Hotel in 2014

- Location within Sydney Location within Australia
- 33.8597°S 151.2070°E
- Location: 100–104 Cumberland Street, The Rocks, City of Sydney, New South Wales, Australia

History
- Built: 1914–1915

Site notes
- Owner: Property NSW

New South Wales Heritage Register
- Official name: Australian Hotel
- Type: state heritage (built)
- Designated: 10 May 2002
- Reference no.: 1528
- Type: Hotel
- Category: Commercial

The Australian Hotel is a heritage-listed hotel at 100–104 Cumberland Street, The Rocks, City of Sydney, New South Wales, Australia. The current structure was constructed from 1914 to 1915, and Property NSW owns the property, being added to the New South Wales State Heritage Register on 10 May 2002.

== History ==
The site is known to have been built upon by the 1820s. As per other ridges of The Rocks, it was likely occupied by the encampment of settlers in the first weeks of the First Fleet's arrival in 1788. Terrace houses occupied the site from the c. 1840s until the construction of the hotel complex in 1914.

The Australian Hotel is one of the oldest continually licensed pubs in Sydney. In 1824 it was licensed to George Morris and referenced in a Sydney Gazette article on 12 August 1824, describing the pub as ″Those noble and extensive premises... are now occupied by George Morris, late of the Greyhound-Inn, Castlereagh Street. Hence forth they will be known by the name of ′The Australian Hotel′″.

Later it was leased to John Murray, situated at 116 Cumberland Street on land contained in the Observatory Hill Resumed Area. In 1907 plans were made to realign Cumberland Street, which included the demolition of the hotel. In 1911, Murray made an application to build a new hotel, to be constructed either by the state government or himself. The corner of Cumberland Street and Gloucester Street was the chosen site.

In 1912, Murray was granted a lease for the new hotel, operative as of 1 January 1913. Before construction, however, the 50-year lease was transferred to Resch's Ltd. The residential buildings on the site were demolished by 1914, and construction of the new hotel completed towards the end of that same year. On 8 May 1914, the Municipal Council approved the construction of a two-storey hotel plus cellar and two shops adjoining (one in Cumberland Street and one in Gloucester Street), the plans having been prepared for and submitted to Council by Resch's Ltd. The structure was two storeys in height with brick walls and an iron roof. A basement, or cellar, was located beneath the split level saloon bar. Two shops were also built on the site, one of which (fronting Cumberland Street) was used as a grocery store.

In 1915, Resch's Ltd sublet the hotel to John Upjohn, who was later convicted of selling adulterated rum. Resch's Ltd merged with Tooth & Co. Ltd in 1931, and the lease was transferred to Tooth and Co. Ltd, with Upjohn remaining licensee until 1939. In 1948, the ground floor was renovated, and in 1955, the hotel was reroofed. Upon the expiration of the 50-year lease in 1963, Tooth & Co. Ltd stayed on as monthly tenants. Under the Sydney Cove Redevelopment Authority Act of 1968, the hotel and surrounding area came under the Authority's jurisdiction.

There were only minor structural changes to the building and minor changes in the building's use from 1929 to 1974.

In 1991–1992 an extensive program of conservation works was carried out. The Cumberland Street shop was rebuilt within the existing shell after fire damage, using evidence from the Gloucester Street shop. The hotel and Gloucester Street shop required structural and fire safety upgrading, and the hotel's ground floor public rooms were refurbished. The exterior was repainted in the original 1920s colour scheme.

In 2018, it operates as the "Australian Heritage Hotel".

== Description ==
The Australian Hotel is a two-storey building with a basement, designed in an Italianate style with a brick exterior and iron-clad roof.

The hotel still retains many of its original features, including the saloon bar, etched signage and pressed metal ceilings.

The archaeological condition of the site is partly disturbed but otherwise well preserved.

== Heritage listing ==
The Australian Hotel and site are of State heritage significance for their historical and scientific cultural values. The site and building are also of State heritage significance for their contribution to The Rocks area, which is of State Heritage significance in its own right. Its inclusion on the registers of the National Trust and National Estate demonstrate the esteem it is held in by the wider community. The Australian Hotel and shops have social significance in its traditional role as a meeting place and abode of working men within the Rocks area and continue to provide the service for which it was designed to the local residents and visitors to the area.

The Australian Hotel is significant as a largely intact example of the public houses built in The Rocks from the establishment of the Colony and part of a suite of buildings, which demonstrate changing social and drinking habits over time. It is also likely to have a high degree of social significance as a traditional meeting place and the abode of working men within The Rocks area, and it continues to provide the service for which it was designed.

Its form and siting reflect the 1903 Hickson, Davis and Vernon planning scheme, designed to improve the hygiene and amenity of The Rocks inhabitants following the 1900 plague outbreak. It has landmark qualities on a prominent site at the corner of Cumberland and Gloucester Streets.

The building is a characteristic example of Edwardian hotel architecture. The building has a high degree of historical preservation. The combination of Hotel and shops in one architectural treatment and the two-level bar demonstrates a response to the site's characteristics and the needs of the community at the time.

The archaeological resources within the site are also highly significant. Relating to the occupation of the site prior to changes for the 1903 planning scheme and construction of the hotel, they provide a rare opportunity in conjunction with other sites to study an early and significant community in the development of Sydney and the State.

Australian Hotel was listed on the New South Wales State Heritage Register on 10 May 2002, having satisfied the following criteria.

The place is important in demonstrating the course, or pattern, of cultural or natural history in New South Wales.

The Australian Hotel is historically significant because the complex and site followed the precepts of the 1903 Hickson, Davis and Vernon planning scheme, designed to improve the hygiene and amenity of The Rocks inhabitants following the 1900 plague outbreak. The relocation of the hotel and the whole development provides evidence of the town planning principles and the prevailing concepts of public health and amenity of the period. The Australian Hotel is also historically significant because it provides evidence of past and current leisure activities in NSW. It is one of the last purpose built hotels in The Rocks. The building is an important remaining example of the public houses built in The Rocks from the establishment of the Colony. The Australian Hotel, in conjunction with these earlier hotels, is part a suite of buildings that demonstrate changing social and drinking habits over time. Substantially intact purpose-built hotels of this period are rare, as most have been altered as a result of changing licensing laws and drinking habits. The site's changing use reflects the urban, economic and social development of the area. The site also reflects the lifestyles of the working and lower middle classes during the early twentieth century. The site also is indicative of the consistent two-storey scale of the area, which predominated in the vicinity prior to construction of the Sydney Harbour Bridge. The shop at 87 Gloucester Street is an almost intact example of an Edwardian shop. The whole building, designed in an Edwardian architectural idiom, remains highly intact and thus provides evidence of past tastes, customs and forms.

The place is important in demonstrating aesthetic characteristics and/or a high degree of creative or technical achievement in New South Wales.

The Australian Hotel is aesthetically significant because it has landmark qualities on a prominent site at the corner of Cumberland and Gloucester Streets. It makes a significant contribution to The Rocks precinct as a visual marker of post-resumption development along with the housing board terraces across the road. This is in contrast to earlier elements such as Susannah Place and the Cumberland/Gloucester Street Archaeological site. The building is an attractive and well-resolved example of Edwardian hotel architecture, with quality finishes, fabric and details. The building has a high degree of intact fabric and details and integrity and as such is relatively rare, as most hotels of this period have been altered as a result of revised licensing laws and changing drinking habits. In addition, the design of the building effectively solves the problems of its corner site and differing street levels.

The place has a strong or special association with a particular community or cultural group in New South Wales for social, cultural or spiritual reasons.

Although not formally assessed, it is likely that the Australian Hotel has a high degree of social significance. This relates to its traditional role as a meeting place and abode of working men within The Rocks area. It continues to provide the service for which it was designed to not only the local residents but also to visitors to the area. The Australian Hotel and shops have social significance as an important feature in The Rocks Conservation area, and contributes strongly to the character of The Rocks.

The place has potential to yield information that will contribute to an understanding of the cultural or natural history of New South Wales.

The Australian Hotel and site has technical/research significance because it demonstrates earlier forms of building practice. The site also contains highly significant archaeological remains from pre-Hotel occupation of the site. Rock-cut features and footings associated with the residential neighbourhood from settlement to c. 1910 have been found and retained beneath both the Hotel and shops. There is very high potential for further remains to be found. In conjunction with the adjoining Cumberland/ Gloucester Streets Archaeological Site, the remains add to an understanding of the community in this area and provide a rare opportunity for archaeological study of an early neighbourhood that is not possible in many other parts of Sydney and the State.

The place possesses uncommon, rare or endangered aspects of the cultural or natural history of New South Wales.

The combination of hotel and shops in one architectural treatment and the two level bar provided an innovative response to the characteristics of the site and the needs of the community at the time. The building has a high degree of intact fabric, details and integrity. Many hotels of this period have been altered as a result of revised licensing laws and changing drinking habits. The early archaeological resources within the site provide a rare opportunity, in conjunction with neighbouring sites, to study an early and significant community in the development of Sydney and the State.

The place is important in demonstrating the principal characteristics of a class of cultural or natural places/environments in New South Wales.

The Australian Hotel is representative of a type of building traditionally associated with a meeting place and abode for working men within the traditional mixed residential, industrial, commercial and maritime uses of The Rocks area.
