= Security (1824 ship) =

History

United Kingdom
- Name: Security
- Owner: 1824:Spencer; 1825:Johnstone & Co.
- Launched: 1824, Yarmouth, Nova Scotia
- Fate: Wrecked 5 December 1827

General characteristics
- Tons burthen: 261, or 263 (bm)

Security was launched at Yarmouth, Nova Scotia in 1824. She sailed to England and then traded with Australia and India. She was wrecked in December 1827.

== Career ==
Security was initially registered at Halifax, Nova Scotia. Security, Stewart, master, arrived on 14 September 1824 at Gravesend, Kent from Halifax. She was re-registered at London on 25 January 1825.

Security entered Lloyd's Register (LR) in 1824 with Stewart, master, and Spencer, owner.

In 1813 the British East India Company (EIC) had lost its monopoly on the trade between Britain and points east of the Cape of Good Hope. British ships were then free to sail to India or the Indian Ocean under a license from the EIC.

On 17 April 1825 Captain Andrew Ross sailed Security for Van Diemen's Land and Port Jackson. She arrived at Hobart Town on 1 September. On 5 September Ross was one of the captains that surveyed the ship Denmark Hill and found her unseaworthy.

On 5 March 1826 Security sailed from Mauritius for Sydney. She arrived on 5 May. Prior to 4 August she arrived at Batavia from New South Wales. On her way she rescued the crew and passengers on Venus, Kilgour, master. Venus had sailed from Sydney to Singapore and had wrecked on the Alerts Reef in the Torres Strait.

Security and Greenock, Miller, master, had been in company with Venus. When Venus struck, Captain Kilgour had warning shots fired from her guns, enabling the other two vessels to avoid Venus's fate.

On 3 June 1827 Security, A. Ross, master, sailed from London, bound for Mauritius and Ceylon, or Penang.

== Loss ==
On 5 December 1827 a gale or hurricane drove Security, Ross, master ashore at Madras and she became a total loss. She ended up on the strand at Fort St George, off San Thomé. Several other British ships were lost at the same time. The masters were all ashore and fortunately casualties among their crews were few.
