= Almorah (1817) =

Sailing ship built at Selby, England in 1817

History

United Kingdom
- Name: Almorah
- Namesake: Almora
- Owner: 1819-1828: Matthew Boyd; 1828-1832:Stephenson & Co.
- Builder: J Foster, Selby
- Launched: 15 March 1817
- Fate: Sank during storm in 1832

General characteristics
- Tons burthen: 415, or 416, or 41671/94 (bm)
- Length: 127 ft (39 m) (overall); 112 ft 0 in (34.1 m) (keel)
- Beam: 29 ft 2 in (8.9 m)
- Propulsion: Sail

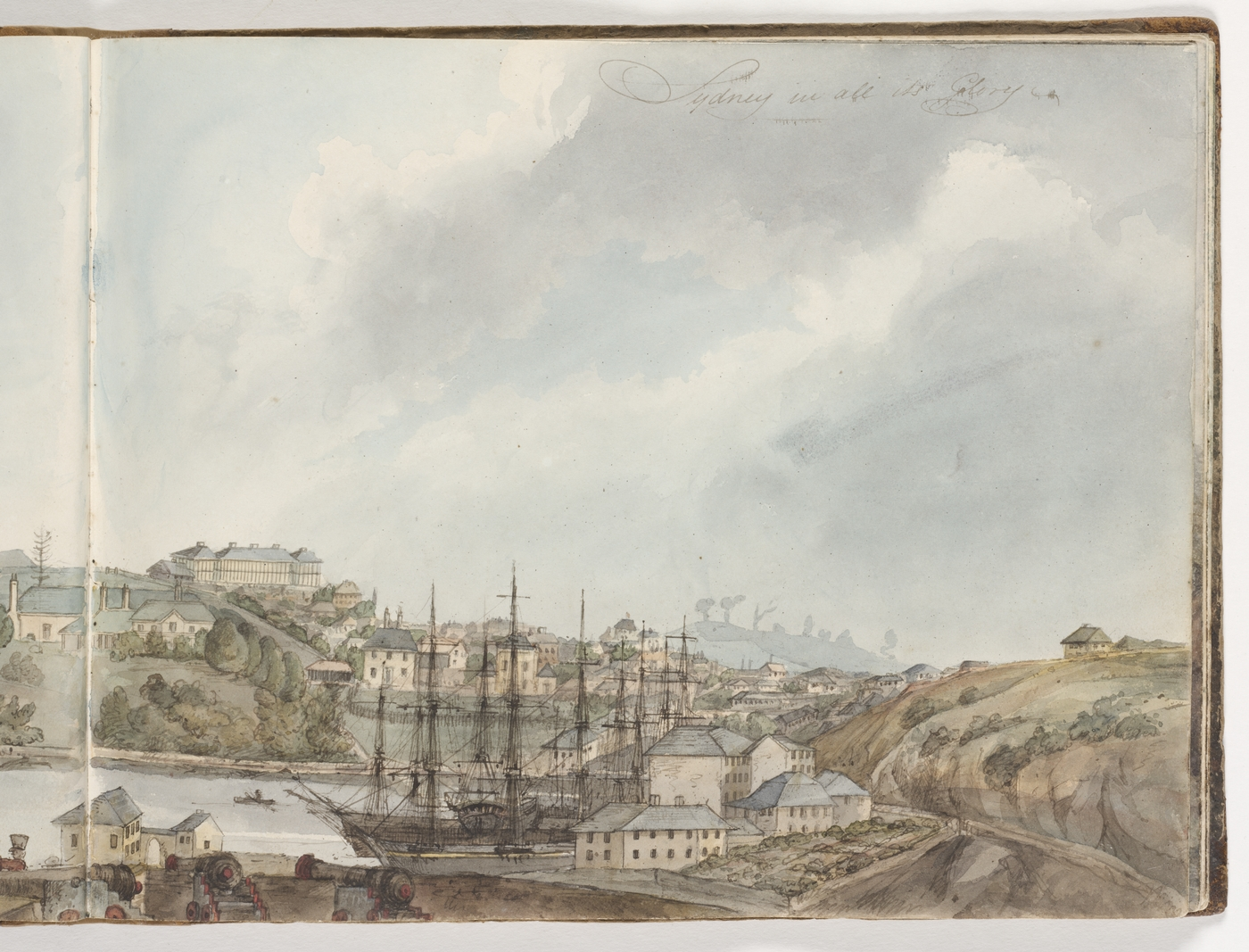
Edward Charles Close, Watercolour painting of Sydney Harbour c1817. State Library of New South Wales

Almorah was built at Selby, England in 1817. She made one voyage for the British East India Company (EIC), and three transporting convicts to Australia. She foundered in 1832 in the North Atlantic.

== Career ==
Her builders registered Almorah on 15 March 1817. Her first master was Captain Thomas McKissock.

=== EIC Voyage ===
Captain Thomas Winter sailed from the Downs on 27 May 1819, bound for Madras and Bengal. Almorah reached Madras on 17 September, and arrived at Fulta on 29 September. Homeward bound, she was at Diamond Harbour on 21 December, and Madras again on 3 January 1820. She reached the Cape of Good Hope on 12 March and arrived at Blackwall on 20 May.

=== Convict voyage #1 ===
On her first convict voyage, under the command on William McKissock, Almorah departed The Downs on 26 April 1817 and arrived in Sydney on 29 August. She transported 180 male convicts, none of whom died on the voyage. She left Port Jackson on 26 October bound for Batavia.

=== Convict voyage #2 ===
Almorah departed Waterford, Ireland, under the command of Thomas Wilson, on 22 August 1820, and arrived in Sydney on 22 December. She embarked 160 male convicts, one of whom died on the voyage.

In July 1822 Almorah was in the Java Sea in company with Richmond, the vessels having sailed from Port Jackson, when Richmond was wrecked on Hog Island on 31 July. Almorah picked up Richmond's crew and took them to Batavia, where they arrived on 5 August.

=== Convict voyage #3 ===
Almorah, under the command of George Hay, departed Cork, Ireland, on 6 April 1824 and arrived in Sydney on 20 August 1824. She carried 109 female convicts, one of whom died during the voyage.

=== The Almorah Affair ===
Thomas Brisbane, governor of the New South Wales colony, chartered Almorah to sail to Batavia and bring back supplies as the colony's food supplies were starting to run short. On 17 February 1825, Almorah returned to Sydney from Batavia. Captain Mitchell, of HMS Slaney, which was serving as a guardship at Port Jackson, seized Almorah for having on board 300 chests of tea. He was urged on by Sydney merchants who did not like Government imports. Probably more importantly, Mitchell would have been entitled to a quarter of the value of the vessel and her cargo if the court upheld his seizure. There was no Court of Admiralty at Sydney, so over Governor Brisbane's objections, Mitchell put a crew aboard Almorah that sailed her on 2 March to Calcutta for adjudication. There HMS Tamar seized Almorah and her cargo. The charge was that the tea violated the EIC's monopoly on the private trade in tea. Litigation lasted five years without any definitive result. One problem was that Brisbane had not specifically mentioned tea in his instructions. Had he done so, there would have been no issue as the EIC monopoly did not apply to government purchases. Eventually the British Government persuaded all concerned to give up their claims. It also paid Almorah's owners £5000 for their freight and losses.

== Later career ==
In 1828 Almorah was sold to Stephenson & Co., London, who placed her in the North Atlantic trade.

The Register of Shipping in 1832 showed Almorah with Ward, master, and trade Hull—Quebec.

== Fate ==
Almorah sailed from Quebec, bound for Hull, on 5 November 1831, and was last seen on 1 December, at longitude 20°W. Almorah foundered in the North Atlantic in 1832.
