= List of shipwrecks in June 1880 =

The list of shipwrecks in June 1880 includes ships sunk, foundered, grounded, or otherwise lost during June 1880.

== 1 June ==
List of shipwrecks: 1 June 1880
Ship	State	Description
Mary Ann	(United Kingdom of Great Britain and Ireland) Isle of Man	The fishing lugger collided with the steamship Rockabil (United Kingdom) and sank off the Seven Heads. Her crew were rescued by Rockabil.
Octave et Marie	France	The ship was driven ashore and wrecked at Viana do Castelo, Portugal. She was on a voyage from "Ligorne" to Bristol, Gloucestershire, United Kingdom.

== 2 June ==
List of shipwrecks: 2 June 1880
Ship	State	Description
Achilles	United Kingdom	The steamship ran aground in the Yangtze at Hankou, China. She was refloated with assistance from the paddle steamer Shanghai (China) and taken in to Wusong, China.
Banshee	United Kingdom	The brigantine ran aground at Schrape Point, Isle of Wight. She was on a voyage from Hartlepool, County Durham to Cowes, Isle of Wight.
Imperial	United Kingdom	The steam yacht sank in the River Ouse at Sandhall, Yorkshire. She was on a voyage from Selby to Goole.
Lady of the Forest	United Kingdom	The schooner foundered off South Rona, Inner Hebrides. Her four crew were rescued by the steamship Dunara Castle. Lady of the Forest was on a voyage from "Balinaes", Ireland to London.
Laura Gillies, and Rochefort	United Kingdom; France	The steamship collided at Penarth, Glamorgan. Laura Gillies was on a voyage from Cardiff, Glamorgan to Havre de Grâce, Seine-Inférieure, France. She was beached. Rochefort was on a voyage from Cardiff to Saint-Nazaire, Charente-Inférieure. She was taken in to Penarth for repairs.

== 3 June ==
List of shipwrecks: 3 June 1880
Ship	State	Description
Arrow	United States	The steamship was damaged by fire in Geneva Lake, Wisconsin. She was rebuilt in April 1881 and returned to service with the name Arthur Kaye.
Cramlington	United Kingdom	The steamship ran aground at Rouen, Seine-Inférieure, France. She was on a voyage from Newcastle upon Tyne, Northumberland to Rouen. She was refloated.
Festina Lente	Flag unknown	The ship was wrecked in the Magdalen Islands, Nova Scotia, Canada. Her crew were rescued.
Gondolier	Canada	The ship was lost off Cape Sable Island, Nova Scotia with the loss of three of her crew. She was on a voyage from Brouwershaven, Germany to New York, United States.
Le Wood	Canada	The barque ran aground at Rotherhithe, Surrey, United Kingdom. She was being towed from London to Gravesend, Kent, United Kingdom.
Miner	United Kingdom	The trow was run down and sunk at Bristol, Gloucestershire by the steamship Rhwindda (United Kingdom). Her crew were rescued. Miner was on a voyage from Bridgwater, Somerset to Bristol.
Rosalind	United Kingdom	The barque was driven ashore at Roche's Point, County Cork. She was on a voyage from the River Plate to Liverpool, Lancashire. Rosalind was refloated the next day and docked.
Vesta	Germany	The barque was wrecked on the coast of Patagonia. Her crew were rescued. She was on a voyage from Newcastle upon Tyne, Northumberland, United Kingdom to San Francisco, California, United States.

== 4 June ==
List of shipwrecks: 4 June 1880
Ship	State	Description
George Canning	United Kingdom	The Thames barge was run into by the steamship Avena (Sweden) and sank in the River Thames at Blackwall, Middlesex. Her crew were rescued.
Hawthorn	United Kingdom	The ship ran aground at Sunderland, County Durham. She was on a voyage from Riga, Russia to Sunderland.
Isabella	United Kingdom	The schooner ran aground on the Goodwin Sands, Kent. She was on a voyage from London to Dublin. She was refloated with assistance from the Ramsgate Lifeboat and assisted in to Ramsgate, Kent in a leaky condition.
Mary	United Kingdom	The schooner ran aground at Sunderland. She was on a voyage from Sunderland to Southampton, Hampshire. She was refloated and put back to Sunderland in a leaky condition.
Mermaid	United Kingdom	The smack was driven ashore at Lindisfarne, Northumberland. She was refloated.
Prinz Frederick Carl	Flag unknown	The steamship ran aground at Sunderland. She was on a voyage from Amsterdam, North Holland, Netherlands to Sunderland. She was refloated but ran aground again.

== 5 June ==
List of shipwrecks: 5 June 1880
Ship	State	Description
Birdstow	Canada	The barque collided with an iceberg and was abandoned in the Atlantic Ocean 41°40′N 51°15′W). Her crew were rescued by the full-rigged ship Liverpool (United Kingdom). Birdstow was on a voyage from Brooklyn, New York to Liverpool, Lancashire.
Ellen	Russia	The barque was driven ashore at "Holmetunge", Denmark. She was refloated the next day and resumed her voyage.
Kedar	United Kingdom	The steamship ran aground on the Meloria Bank, off Livorno, Italy. She was on a voyage from Liverpool to Livorno. She was refloated.
Loyal	United Kingdom	The brig was driven ashore and wrecked at Granville, Manche, France. She was on a voyage from Swansea, Glamorgan to Granville.

== 6 June ==
List of shipwrecks: 6 June 1880
Ship	State	Description
'HMS Flamingo	Royal Navy	The gunvessel collided with an iceberg off the coast of the Newfoundland Colony and was damaged. She put back to Saint John's, Newfoundland Colony for repairs.

== 7 June ==
List of shipwrecks: 7 June 1880
Ship	State	Description
Advance	United Kingdom	The barque sprang a leak and foundered in the Atlantic Ocean. Her crew were rescued by the barque Lorenzo (United Kingdom). Advance was on a voyage from Liverpool, Lancashire to Java, Netherlands East Indies.
Annie	United Kingdom	The schooner ran aground on the Doom Bar. She was on a voyage from Middlesbrough, Yorkshire to Swansea, Glamorgan.
Cape Sable	United Kingdom	The ship departed from Sunderland, County Durham for Singapore, Straits Settlements. No further trace, presumed foundered with the loss of all 40 crew.
Consett	United Kingdom	The ship was wrecked on the Suadiva Atoll, in the Maldive Islands. Her crew were rescued by a Maldivian brig. She was on a voyage from Bassein, India to Port Said, Egypt.
Una	United Kingdom	The steamship was driven ashore and wrecked at "Kallboden", Grand Duchy of Finland. She was on a voyage from Kronstadt, Russia to Hull, Yorkshire.

== 8 June ==
List of shipwrecks: 8 June 1880
Ship	State	Description
Covadonga	Chilean Navy	War of the Pacific: The schooner was damaged by shore based artillery and was beached at Arica, Peru.
BAP Manco Cápac	Peruvian Navy	War of the Pacific: The Canonicus-class monitor was scuttled at Arica to prevent capture by the Chileans. Her crew were taken as prisoners of war.
Orient	United Kingdom	The barque was abandoned in the Pacific Ocean off the Chiloé Archipelago, Peru (42°41′S 78°20′W). Her nineteen crew were rescued by the barque Explorer (United Kingdom). Orient was on a voyage from Cardiff, Glamorgan to Portland, Oregon, United States.

== 9 June ==
List of shipwrecks: 9 June 1880
Ship	State	Description
Anne Powor	United Kingdom	The fishing yawl was run down and sunk in Dungarvan Bay by the barque Florence Young (United States) with the loss of one of her five crew. Survivors were rescued by Florence Young.
Bertha	United States	The ship ran aground at Bermuda. She was on a voyage from Bermuda to New York. She was refloated and resumed her voyage.
Maria Sophia	United Kingdom	The ship was driven ashore 50 nautical miles (93 km) from Narva, Russia.

== 10 June ==
List of shipwrecks: 10 June 1880
Ship	State	Description
Anna Catherine	United Kingdom	The ship departed from Newcastle upon Tyne, Northumberland for Viana do Castelo, Portugal. No further trace, reported missing.
Bengal	United Kingdom	The ship collided with a ferryboat and ran aground at New York, United States. She was on a voyage from New York to London. She was refloated.
Rowland	United Kingdom	The steamship collided with the wreck of M. Moxham (United Kingdom) in the Danube and was beached.
Stranger	United Kingdom	The pilot boat was run down and sunk off Cardiff, Glamorgan by the steamship Cæsarea (United Kingdom). Her three crew were rescued by Cæsarea.

== 11 June ==
List of shipwrecks: 11 June 1880
Ship	State	Description
Bay of Biscay	United Kingdom	The vessel set sail from Tower Hill. She was subsequently wrecked with the loss of all on board.
Cuba Española	Spanish Navy	The gunboat suffered a boiler explosion at Santiago de Cuba, Cuba which killed twenty and injured 113 of her crew.
Hermann	Germany	The barque ran aground on the Finosca Rocks, off Rota, Spain and was severely damaged. She was on a voyage from Cádiz, Spain to Greenock, Renfrewshire, United Kingdom. She was refloated and towed in to Cádiz.
John McIntyre	United Kingdom	The steamship ran aground on the Corton Sand, in the North Sea off the coast of Suffolk. She was on a voyage from South Shields, County Durham to London. She was refloated.
Narragansett	United States	The paddle steamer collided with the steamship Stonington (United States) in Long Island Sound off Saybrook, Connecticut. She caught fire and ran aground with the loss of about 30 of the 300–350 people on board. Survivors were rescued by Stonington and City of New York (United States). Narragansett was later refloated, rebuilt, and returned to service.
Sarah Macdonald	United Kingdom	The ship collided with Perseverance (United Kingdom) in the River Mersey and was severely damaged.
Queen Victoria	United Kingdom	The steamship departed from Calcutta, India for London. No further trace, presumed foundered in the Indian Ocean with the loss of all hands.
Titania	United Kingdom	The brigantine collided with an iceberg and sank in the Atlantic Ocean 50 nautical miles (93 km) south east of Cape Spear, Newfoundland Colony with the loss of a crew member. She was on a voyage from Saint John's, Newfoundland Colony to Miramichi, New Brunswick, Canada.
Stanton, and Vendée	United Kingdom; France	The steamships ran aground and collided at Bilbao, Spain. Vendée was on a voyage from Bilbao to Newport, Monmouthshire, United Kingdom.
Vrouw Maria	BelgiumUnited Kingdom	The barge was run down and sunk in the Scheldt at Fort la Pirie by the steamship Ralph Creyke. Vrouw Maria was on a voyage from "Miel" to Lille, Nord, France.

== 12 June ==
List of shipwrecks: 12 June 1880
Ship	State	Description
HMS Flamingo	Royal Navy	The gunvessel collided with an iceberg in the Grand Banks of Newfoundland and was damaged at the bow. She put in to Saint John, New Brunswick, Canada.
Queen Victoria	United Kingdom	The steamship departed from Calcutta, India for London. No further trace, reported overdue.
Weaver	United Kingdom	The schooner ran aground at Caernarfon. She was refloated and taken in to the Menai Strait.
Wild Wood	United Kingdom	The barque was driven ashore at Horton Point, Long Island, New York. She was on a voyage from New York City to Buenos Aires, Argentina. She was refloated with the assistance of a steamship and resumed her voyage.

== 13 June ==
List of shipwrecks: 13 June 1880
Ship	State	Description
Anchoria	United Kingdom	The steamship collided with the steamship The Queen (United Kingdom) 300 nautical miles (560 km) off Sandy Hook, New Jersey, United States (40°39′N 67°42′W). All 180 passengers were taken off by The Queen. Anchoria was on a voyage from New York, United States to Glasgow, Renfrewshire. She put back to New York.
Cape Sable	United Kingdom	The ship was sighted whilst on a voyage from Sunderland, County Durham to Singapore, Straits Settlements. No further trace, presumed foundered with the loss of all 29 crew.

== 15 June ==
List of shipwrecks: 15 June 1880
Ship	State	Description
Glenavon	United Kingdom	The steamship ran aground at Villa Real, Spain. She was refloated.
Maha Buleshwar	United Kingdom	The barque was wrecked at Ancutta, Laccadive Islands. Six of her crew were rescued from a boat on 17 August by the steamship Madura (United Kingdom). Twelve of her crew were rescued from Bingaroo on 26 August by the steamship Ash (United Kingdom). Maha Buleshwar was on a voyage from Bombay, India to London.
Marbella	United Kingdom	The steamship ran aground at Villa Real. She was refloated.
Topaz	United Kingdom	The steam lighter was destroyed by a boiler explosion 10 nautical miles (19 km) west of Sanda Island with the loss of her captain. Three survivors were rescued by the steam lighter Glasgow (United Kingdom).

== 18 June ==
List of shipwrecks: 18 June 1880
Ship	State	Description
Albatross	United States	The ship was damaged by fire at New York. She was on a voyage from Cienfuegos, Cuba to New York.
Great Western	United Kingdom	The steamship was driven ashore at Cherbourg, Manche, France. She was refloated and taken in to Cherbourg.
Humboldt	United Kingdom	The steamship caught fire in the Atlantic Ocean. She was on a voyage from New York, United States to Liverpool, Lancashire. The fire was extinguished and she completed her voyage.
Paulus	Netherlands	The schooner was run into by a steamship and sank 20 nautical miles (37 km) south west of the Eddystone Rock, Cornwall, United Kingdom. Her five crew were rescued by the barque Harriet Williams (United Kingdom). Paulus was on a voyage from Briton Ferry, Glamorgan, United Kingdom to Saint Petersburg, Russia.
Quinto	Italy	The barque was wrecked near Castelo Branco, Azores with the loss of six of her sixteen crew. She was on a voyage from Rangoon, Burma to Falmouth, Cornwall, United Kingdom.
Sir Bevis	United Kingdom	The steamship ran ashore at Coverack, Cornwall. She was on a voyage from Southampton, Hampshire to Cardiff, Glamorgan. She was refloated and resumed her voyage.

== 19 June ==
List of shipwrecks: 19 June 1880
Ship	State	Description
Amethyst	United Kingdom	The steam yacht was driven ashore at Dartmouth, Devon and was damaged. She was on a voyage from Cowes, Isle of Wight to Queenstown, County Cork. She was refloated and taken in to Dartmouth.
Duke of Devonshire	United Kingdom	The steamship ran aground at Suez, Egypt. She was refloated with the assistance of a tug the next day.
Ellen	United Kingdom	The steamship struck a rock and sank off the coast of Manche, France. Her crew survived.
Marco Polo	United Kingdom	The smack sank off Norderney, Germany. Her crew were rescued.
Orestes	United Kingdom	The ship was driven ashore at Malmö, Sweden. She was on a voyage from Liverpool to Malmö. She was refloated.
Polynesian	United Kingdom	The steamship ran aground in Lake Saint Pierre. She was on a voyage from Liverpool, Lancashire to Quebec City, Canada, or from Montreal, Quebec, Canada to Liverpool. She was refloated.
Stirling	United Kingdom	The steamship struck the Gannet Rocks, in the Firth of Forth. She was on a voyage from Kronstadt, Russia to Leith, Lothian. She was refloated and completed her voyage.

== 20 June ==
List of shipwrecks: 20 June 1880
Ship	State	Description
Wanganui	New Zealand	The steamship grounded at the mouth of the Clarence River, New South Wales, floated off, was then abandoned and drifted to sea. All passengers and crew rescued with the exception of two lost from the rescuing pilot boat. She was on a coastal voyage from Sydney to Grafton, New South Wales via Newcastle. The derelict sank under tow of the tug Cyclops one mile outside the river bar.

== 21 June ==
List of shipwrecks: 21 June 1880
Ship	State	Description
Andean	United Kingdom	The steamship was driven ashore in Manger Bay, Jamaica. She was on a voyage from Kingston, Jamaica to Belize City, British Honduras. She was refloated and resumed her voyage.
Emma	United Kingdom	The yawl ran aground on the Whitburn Steel Rock. She was on a voyage from Blyth, Northumberland to Banff, Aberdeenshire. She was refloated and towed in to Blyth.
Hotspur	United Kingdom	The steamship ran aground on the Middle Scarp, in the River Tyne, whilst avoiding a collision with a fishing boat. She was on a voyage from South Shields, County Durham to Naples, Italy. She was refloated and resumed her voyage.
Poolscar	United Kingdom	The barque was driven ashore and wrecked at Holm, Orkney Islands. Her crew were rescued. She was on a voyage from Bremen, Germany to Quebec City, Canada.
Susan A. Blaisdell	United States	The barque was wrecked off the mouth of the Chimlicon River, Spanish Honduras.

== 22 June ==
List of shipwrecks: 22 June 1880
Ship	State	Description
Diomedea	Flag unknown	The steamship ran aground at Kertch, Russia. She was on a voyage from Kertch to Marseille, Bouches-du-Rhône, France. She was refloated on 24 June and resumed her voyage.
Obilie	Austria-Hungary	The barque was damaged by an onboard explosion at Newport, Monmouthshire, United Kingdom.
Stillwater	United Kingdom	The barque ran aground at Calais, France. She was on a voyage from New Orleans, Louisiana, United States to Calais.

== 24 June ==
List of shipwrecks: 24 June 1880
Ship	State	Description
City of New York	United States	The ship was destroyed by fire and sank in the East River at New York. She was on a voyage from Havana, Cuba to New York.
Harald Harfanger	Norway	The steamship ran aground in Seierø Bay. She was on a voyage from Newcastle upon Tyne, Northumberland, United Kingdom to Kronstadt, Russia.
Union	United Kingdom	The full=rigged ship was driven ashore at Rhoscolyn, Anglesey. She was on a voyage from New York, United States to Liverpool, Lancashire. She was refloated with assistance from the tug Great Britain (United Kingdom) and resumed her voyage in a leaky condition.

== 25 June ==
List of shipwrecks: 25 June 1880
Ship	State	Description
City of Chester	United Kingdom	The schooner ran aground at Queenstown, County Cork.
Dantzig	United Kingdom	The ship was driven ashore in the Pentland Firth. She was on a voyage from Porth Madoc, Caernarfonshire to Stettin, Germany. She was refloated and put in to Banff, Aberdeenshire.
Harvest Home	United Kingdom	The brig sprang a leak and foundered in the English Channel 4 nautical miles (7.4 km) south east of Beachy Head. Sussex. Her four crew survived. She was on a voyage from Sunderland, County Durham to Portsmouth, Hampshire and/or Jersey, Channel Islands.
Nancy Jones	United Kingdom	The schooner collided with the steamship Fire King (United Kingdom) and sank in the Irish Sea off the Morecambe Lightship ( Trinity House). Her crew were rescued by Fire King. Nancy Jones was on a voyage from Dublin to the River Duddon.

== 26 June ==
List of shipwrecks: 26 June 1880
Ship	State	Description
Eliza	United Kingdom	The Thames barge was run into by the steamship Solway (United Kingdom) at Rotherhithe, Surrey. She was beached and sank.
Enriqueta	United Kingdom	The yacht was driven ashore and severely damaged at Kingstown, County Dublin. She was refloated.
Johnny Smith	Canada	The barque sprang a leak and foundered in the North Sea 70 nautical miles (130 km) east north east of Kinnaird Head, Aberdeenshire, United Kingdom. Six of her crew were rescued by the lugger Dinnie (Netherlands). The captain of Dinnie and four crew of Johnny Smith landed at Peterhead, Aberdeenshire in a boat. Johnny Smith was on a voyage from Königsberg, Germany to New York.
Jylland	Denmark	The steamship collided with an Imperial Russian Navy ironclad in the Gulf of Finland and became severely leaky. She was on a voyage from Kronstadt, Russia to Rouen, Seine-Inférieure, France.
Quickstep	United Kingdom	The yacht was driven ashore and severely damaged at Kingstown. She was refloated.
Samuel Cawood	Cape Colony	The tug was driven ashore and wrecked at Port Alfred.

== 27 June ==
List of shipwrecks: 27 June 1880
Ship	State	Description
Helene	Norway	The schooner ran aground at Leith, Lothian, United Kingdom and was damaged. She was on a voyage from Holmestrand to Leith. She was refloated on 30 June and taken in to Leith.
John and Samuel	United Kingdom	The smack was driven ashore at Donaghadee, County Antrim. She was on a voyage from Harrington, Cumberland to Donaghadee.
Wilhelm Tell	Germany	The steamship ran aground off "Sundre". She was on a voyage from Lübeck to Saint Petersburg, Russia. She was refloated and with assistance from the steamship Neptun (Germany) and taken in to Ronehamn, Gotland, Sweden.

== 28 June ==
List of shipwrecks: 28 June 1880
Ship	State	Description
Alexandria	United States	The full-rigged ship ran aground at Penarth, Glamorgan, United Kingdom. She was on a voyage from Penarth to Aspinwall, United States of Colombia.
Circassian	United Kingdom	The brig was driven ashore on Dragør, Denmark. She was on a voyage from Newcastle upon Tyne, Northumberland to Port Kunda, Russia. She was refloated with the assistance of a steamship and taken in to Copenhagen, Denmark.
Colombo	UKGBI	The ship ran aground on the Goodwin Sands, Kent. She was on a voyage from Bassein, India to Bremen, Germany. She was refloated and towed in to The Downs by the brig Undaunted (United Kingdom).
Crighton	United Kingdom	The steamship ran aground at Denkam or Demkan, 16 nautical miles (30 km) south east of Sandhamn, Norway. Her crew were rescued. She was on a voyage from South Shields, County Durham to Stockholm, Sweden. She was refloated and taken in to Stockholm in a wrecked condition.
Gipsy	United Kingdom	The steam yacht was damaged by fire at Oban, Argyllshire.
Unnamed	Flag unknown	The brigantine ran aground on the Pennington Spit, off the Isle of Wight, United Kingdom.

== 29 June ==
List of shipwrecks: 29 June 1880
Ship	State	Description
Ardandhu	United Kingdom	The steamship ran aground at Kertch, Russia. She was on a voyage from the Clyde to Odesa, Russia.
Bohemian	Canada	The steamship collided with, and broke, lock gates and sank in the Lachine Canal at Montreal, Quebec. Several people were rumoured to have been drowned.
Humboldt	United Kingdom	The steamship caught fire at Liverpool, Lancashire.
J. B. Blanchard, W. H. Matthews, and Zeb Raymond	Canada	The barges were sunk in the Lachine Canal at Montreal by floodwater from the breaking of lock gates by the steamship Bohemian ( Canada).
Venetia	United Kingdom	The steamship ran ashore on Jebbel Zukur and was wrecked. She was on a voyage from Venice, Italy to Bombay, India. She was refloated and taken in to Aden, Aden Settlement.
Twenty unnamed vessels	Canada	The barges became stranded in the Lachine Canal at Montreal due to the draining of the canal after the steamship Bohemian ( (Canada) ) collided with, and broke, lock gates. Many vessels broke their backs and all were damaged.

== 30 June ==
List of shipwrecks: 30 June 1880
Ship	State	Description
Derbyshire	United Kingdom	The full-rigged ship was driven ashore at Brixton, Isle of Wight. She was on a voyage from Havre de Grâce, Seine-Inférieure, France to Montreal, Quebec, Canada. She was refloated with assistance from the tug Lightning (United Kingdom), which towed her in to Cowes, Isle of Wight.
Orpheus	United Kingdom	The brig ran aground on the Nore and broke her back. She was on a voyage from Hartlepool, County Durham to London. She was refloated.

== Unknown date ==
List of shipwrecks: Unknown date in June 1879
Ship	State	Description
Acelia Thurlow	United States	The ship was wrecked in the Caicos Islands. She was on a voyage from Baltimore, Maryland to Aspinwall, United States of Colombia.
Actif	Norway	The barque was wrecked at Parrsboro, Nova Scotia, Canada. She was on a voyage from Parrsboro to a British port.
Alianza	Peruvian Navy	War of the Pacific: The torpedo boat was scuttled by her crew to prevent her capture by advancing Chilean forces.
Arthur	Canada	The brigantine struck a rock off Gonâve Island, Haiti and foundered. Her crew survived. She was on a voyage from Port-au-Prince, Haiti to Boston, Massachusetts, United States.
Australian Sovereign	New South Wales	The ship was wrecked at Nouméa, New Caledonia before 16 June. Her crew were rescued.
Ayr	United Kingdom	The barque was wrecked at the mouth of the Magdalena River, United States of Colombia. Her crew were rescued. She was on a voyage from Cardiff, Glamorgan to Barranquilla, United States of Colombia.
Birchvale	United Kingdom	The ship was wrecked on the Alguada Reef after 20 June. She was on a voyage from Samarang to Surabaya, Netherlands East Indies.
Breconshire	United Kingdom	The ship collided with Moskwa (Flag unknown) at Hankou, China and was beached.
Cape Sable	United Kingdom	The ship departed from Sunderland, County Durham for Singapore, Straits Settlements. No further trace, foundered with the loss of all 28 crew.
Catharina	Germany	The schooner was wrecked in the Opobo River, Africa. Her crew were rescued.
Christine	Denmark	The schooner foundered in the Baltic Sea. Her crew were rescued. She was on a voyage from Saint Petersburg, Russia to Kiel, Germany.
City of Brooklyn	United States	The ship was driven ashore. She was on a voyage from Liverpool, Lancashire, United Kingdom to Saint John, New Brunswick, Canada. She was refloated with assistance and taken in to Saint John in a leaky condition.
Concordia	Norway	The full-rigged ship was wrecked on the Knavestone Rock, off the coast of Northumberland, United Kingdom. Her crew survived. She was on a voyage from Moss to Newcastle upon Tyne, Northumberland.
Condor	United Kingdom	The ship was driven ashore. She was refloated and taken in to Svartklubben, Swedem.
Congress	United Kingdom	The brig was wrecked in the Magdalen Islands, Nova Scotia. Her crew were rescued. She was on a voyage from Maryport, Cumberland to Quebec City, Canada
Cyril	United Kingdom	The schooner ran aground at Dungarvan, County Waterford. She was on a voyage from Cardiff to Carrigaline, County Cork.
Dapueto Padre	Flag unknown	The ship was driven ashore on Bermuda. She was on a voyage from the Cape Verde Islands to Baltimore, Maryland, United States. She was refloated.
Despatch	United Kingdom	The ship foundered in the North Sea off the mouth of the River Tyne. Wreckage from the ship washed up at Staithes, Yorkshire on 10 June and at South Shields, County Durham on 17 June.
Foreaz	United Kingdom	The steamship was destroyed at sea by a boiler explosion. At least three crew survived.
George W. Clyde	United States	The ship was damaged by fire at New York. She was on a voyage from Charleston, South Carolina to New York.
Govino	United Kingdom	The steamship was driven ashore on the Canadian coast opposite "Native river" on or before 19 June.
Hygea	Denmark	The brigantine was driven ashore and wrecked at Barranquilla, United States of Colombia. Her crew were rescued.
Idea	United Kingdom	The ship was driven ashore at Altenbruch, Germany. She was on a voyage from Hamburg Germany to Middlesbrough, Yorkshire. She was refloated and resumed her voyage.
Ideal	United Kingdom	The full-rigged ship was driven ashore. She was on a voyage from Gaspé, Quebec, Canada to Barbados. She was refloated and put in to Port Mulgrave, Nova Scotia in a leaky condition.
Ilen	France	The steamship was wrecked at Cap La Hougue, Manche.
Jacoba	United Kingdom	The ship was beached at Sketty, Glamorgan. She was on a voyage from Bridgwater, Somerset to Liverpool, Lancashire.
Lady of the Lake	United Kingdom	The ship ran aground in the Schuylkill River. She was on a voyage from Philadelphia, Pennsylvania, United States to Cork. She was refloated and resumed her voyage.
Nola	United Kingdom	The ship was driven ashore in Copapo Bay, Chile.
Octavie et Marie	France	The ship was driven ashore and wrecked at Viana do Castelo, Portugal. Her crew were rescued.
Pedersholm	Denmark	The ship sprang a leak and foundered in the Atlantic Ocean 200 nautical miles (370 km) west of Cape Finisterre, Spain with the loss of a crew member. Survivors were rescued by the barque Caman (Austria-Hungary). Pedersholm was on a voyage from St. Ubes, Portugal to Fredrikshavn.
Poneke	New Zealand	The schooner left Onehunga for Picton with six crew on 11 June. She was subsequently sighted off Greymouth but was not seen again.
Poolscar	United Kingdom	The ship was driven ashore at Roseness, Orkney Islands and broke in two.
Presto	Norway	The brig was driven ashore on the West Fingrund and was damaged. She was refloated and taken in to Söderhamn, Sweden.
Rokeby	United Kingdom	The steamship was driven ashore at the entrance to Bjorko Sound and was severely damaged. She was on a voyage from Kronstadt, Russia to Vyborg, Grand Duchy of Finland. She had been refloated by 14 June and put back to Kronstadt for repairs.
Salem	United States	The ship was driven ashore and wrecked on Anticosti Island, Nova Scotia. Her crew were rescued. She was on a voyage from Quebec City to Bristol, Gloucestershire, United Kingdom.
Seawanhaka	United States	The steamship caught fire and was beached with the loss of between 40 and 50 lives. She was carrying between 400 and 500 passengers on a voyage from New York to Glen Cove, New York.
Sicilian	United Kingdom	The steamship was driven ashore on Sherbro Island, Sierra Leone. She was on a voyage from Hamburg, Germany to the west coast of Africa. She was refloated on 8 June and resumed her voyage.
St. Clair	United Kingdom	The steamship was driven ashore in Castle Bay.
Tissa	United Kingdom	The steamship was severely damaged by fire at Liverpool, Lancashire.
Xanthus	United Kingdom	The whaler was reported to have been crushed by ice and sank in Melville Bay. Her crew survived. It was subsequently reported that four of her crew had been charged with setting her on fire and wilfully destroying her.
Twenty unnamed vessels	(Russian Empire) Grand Duchy of Finland	The ships were wrecked in the Bay of Kronstadt with loss of life.
