= William Quick =

William Quick may refer to:

- William Quick (water polo) (1902-1994), British Olympic water polo player
- William F. Quick (1885–1966), American machinist, lawyer, judge and Wisconsin State senator
- William Thomas Quick (born 1946), American conservative blogger, novelist and ghostwriter
- William Henry Quick (1843–1911), New Zealand businessman, politician, and solicitor
