= SS Wanganui =

Coordinates: 29.420502°S 153.382708°E

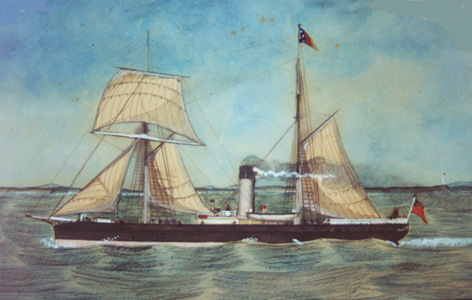

History
- Name: Wanganui
- Owner: Wanganui Steam Navigation Company 1863 – 1873; Messrs Henry Houghton and Co. 1873 – 1880; Messrs Nipper & See 1880
- Port of registry: Dunedin, NZ 47436
- Builder: Gourlay Brothers Dundee, Scotland
- Cost: £9000
- Yard number: Marine Parade 19
- Laid down: 8 May 1863
- Launched: 30 July 1863
- Maiden voyage: 20 October 1863
- Fate: Wrecked 20 June 1880

General characteristics
- Type: Brigantine screw steamer
- Tonnage: 207 GRT; 179 NRT
- Length: 144 ft 9 in (44.12 m)
- Beam: 20 ft 9 in (6.32 m)
- Draught: 9 ft 4 in (2.84 m)
- Installed power: 50hp
- Propulsion: Screw

The Wanganui was an iron Brigantine Twin Boiler Screw steamer built by Gourlay Brothers & Co and launched in July 1863 for the Wanganui Steam Navigation Company for trade around the Wanganui region of New Zealand. The vessel served in this region up to 1873 when its ownership was transferred to Messrs Henry Houghton and Co., of Dunedin. In 1880 the vessel was transferred in to the Australian East coast service where it sank whilst entering Clarence River on 20 June 1880.

== Ship description and construction ==
In September 1862 the Wanganui Steam Navigation Company was formed in the view of an increasing trade to Wanganui by the purchase a new screw steamer of approximately 200 tons burden, suitable, not only for ordinary requirements, in the conveyance of produce and goods between that place and Wellington, but also specially fitted up for the transit of cattle By December 1862 the vessel had begun construction with Captain Linklater (master of the local vessel Tyne) proceeding from New Zealand aboard the Asterope to bring the new vessel back out

By 30 July 1863 it was reported that, a fine new steamer was launched from the iron building yard of the Gourlay Brothers & Co with the vessel to be named by Miss Margeret Watt, eldest daughter of W. H. Watt, Esq., of Westmerethe the Wanganui, and is to be commanded by Captain Linklater for service in New Zealand coastal trade.

The vessel was an iron single deck and the bridge ship with 2 masts rigged as a Brigantine with dimensions

Length from foredeck of stem to sternpost was 144 feet 9 inches (44.12 m)
Length overall 154 feet 0 inches (46.94 m)
Main Breadth to outside plank 29 feet 0 inches (8.84 m)
Depth of Hold 9 feet 4 inches (2.84 m)

Draft @ 160 tons dead weight 8 feet 6 inches (2.59 m)
Draft forward 6 feet 0 inches (1.83 m) aft 7 feet 6 inches (2.29 m)

The vessel had a 206.72 gross register tons (GRT) and a 164.60 net register tons (NRT) when first manufactured

=== Propulsion ===
The Wanganui was powered by two steel boilers and this steam was fed into two 25 horsepower (19 kW) compound steam engine manufactured by the shipbuilder Gourlay Brothers & Co

The vessel was recorded as able to achieve a speed of 9 knots, but also recorded as capable of up to 10 knots by its single 3 blade screw

=== Externals and interior ===
When the vessel first arrived in New Zealand its appearance was described as a remarkably fine boat and by far the finest of her size that we have yet seen in New Zealand waters.

her lines being remarkably beautiful, and conveying the idea of great strength, as well as of perfect symmetry. On boarding her one has the idea of being in a gentleman's yacht, so complete is her equipment, and so well finished in every detail. From her poop deck you descend into her saloon by a commodious staircase. The saloon is elegantly fitted up, having carved oak and gilt cornices, and the walls ornamented with fine paintings in panels all round. The left hand as you enter is a commodious cabin for the captain, and besides 9 berths partitioned off for passengers, there is sleeping accommodation in the saloon for no fewer than 34. There is also a ladies' cabin fitted up with six berths. The forecabin is a plain but decent apartment with 9 berths and sleeping accommodation' for 20 in all. Here are the cabins of the engineers and mates

additionally described as handsome and complete a steamer as is to be found in Australian waters

The saloon of the Wanganui is roomy and tastefully fitted up with brilliant panels of stained glass and finely finished hand painting representing flowers and fruits. The couches are of crimson plush velvet, with ample sleeping room in the round stern and along the sides; and altogether, with the bright and variegated stained glass of the skylight

=== Maiden voyage ===
The Wanganui left Glasgow on 20 October 1863 and arrived at Wanganui on the Friday 4 March 1864 after a passage of 136 days under canvas the screw steamer had arrived off the river on the Wednesday, but had been prevented from coming in on that day and had to stood off as an easterly wind had come up, which prevented the vessel from making the land till the Friday evening before it could enter the river

Once the vessel reached its new home port it had its screw shipped and all of its machinery and rigging put in order before making a short trip down the Whanganui River on the afternoon of Wednesday 30 March 1864 to test the working of the machinery. Several of the directors of the Wanganui Steam Navigation Company and other residents were on board. The company was highly delighted with their short trip which extended merely to the Heads as the state of the tide preventing their going out to sea. The machinery worked admirably, and it was observed that the noise made by the shaft of the screw was much less than is usual in such vessels. Before starting, Captain Linklater entertained the Directors at dinner.

== Ship service history ==
=== Ownership by the Wanganui Steam Navigation Company 1864 to 1873 ===
==== Wanganui Steam Navigation Company 1864 to 1866 ====
One of the first voyages of the Wanganui in New Zealand on 12 April 1864 was from Wanganui to Nelson where while in charge of the harbours pilot, who ran the vessel up to the wharf with full steam on causing the vessel anchor to run foul of the Intercolonial Royal Mail Steam Packet Co SS Airedale's steering gear and carry away some of the Airedale's stanchions. The Wanganui suffered a broken iron plate in the bow. The damage done to both vessels was about £100.

The SS Wanganui, whist heading for Dunedin and having already arrived inside the Otago Heads got upon a bank on the seaward side of the cross channel. The vessel had previously shipped upwards of fifty passengers at Picton for Lyttelton and Dunedin. Having got on the bank at high water, there was some difficulty in re-floating the vessel until about fifteen tons of coals were taken out of the vessel via punts The vessel was not under charge of a pilot.

When arriving at Marlborough on Thursday 29 December 1864 the Wanganui fired its signal gun which then promptly burst and went literally in pieces. Some of the pieces of the gun and carriage went right through the bottom of one of the boats whist other pieces were lodged in the lower part of the bridge with the man who fired the gun having a narrow escape as a piece passed close to his head, striking the vessel below to the bridge, as he stepped behind a pillar. Three small pieces were carried clean through the steward's window, but without doing much damage.

In the 6 months between October 1864 and April 1865 the SS Wanganui completed 29 Trips between Wanganui consisting of

- 7 to Manukau
- 3 to Taranaki
- 15 to Wellington
- 1 to Dunedin
- 1 to Picton
- 2 to Waimate

In the following 6 months to December 1865 the SS Wanganui the trips consisting of

- 2 to New Plymouth (Taranaki)
- 18 to Wellington
- 1 to Nelson
- 1 to Picton

In May 1866 one of the crew members of the SS Wanganui was badly hurt whilst handling bullocks when they got very excited in the process of landing after having been carried by the steamer on a trip to Lyttelton.

In June 1866 at the half yearly meeting of the Wanganui Steam Navigation Company it was carried to reduce the insurance from the £8000 down to £5000.

==== 1866 Death of seaman William Mathers ====
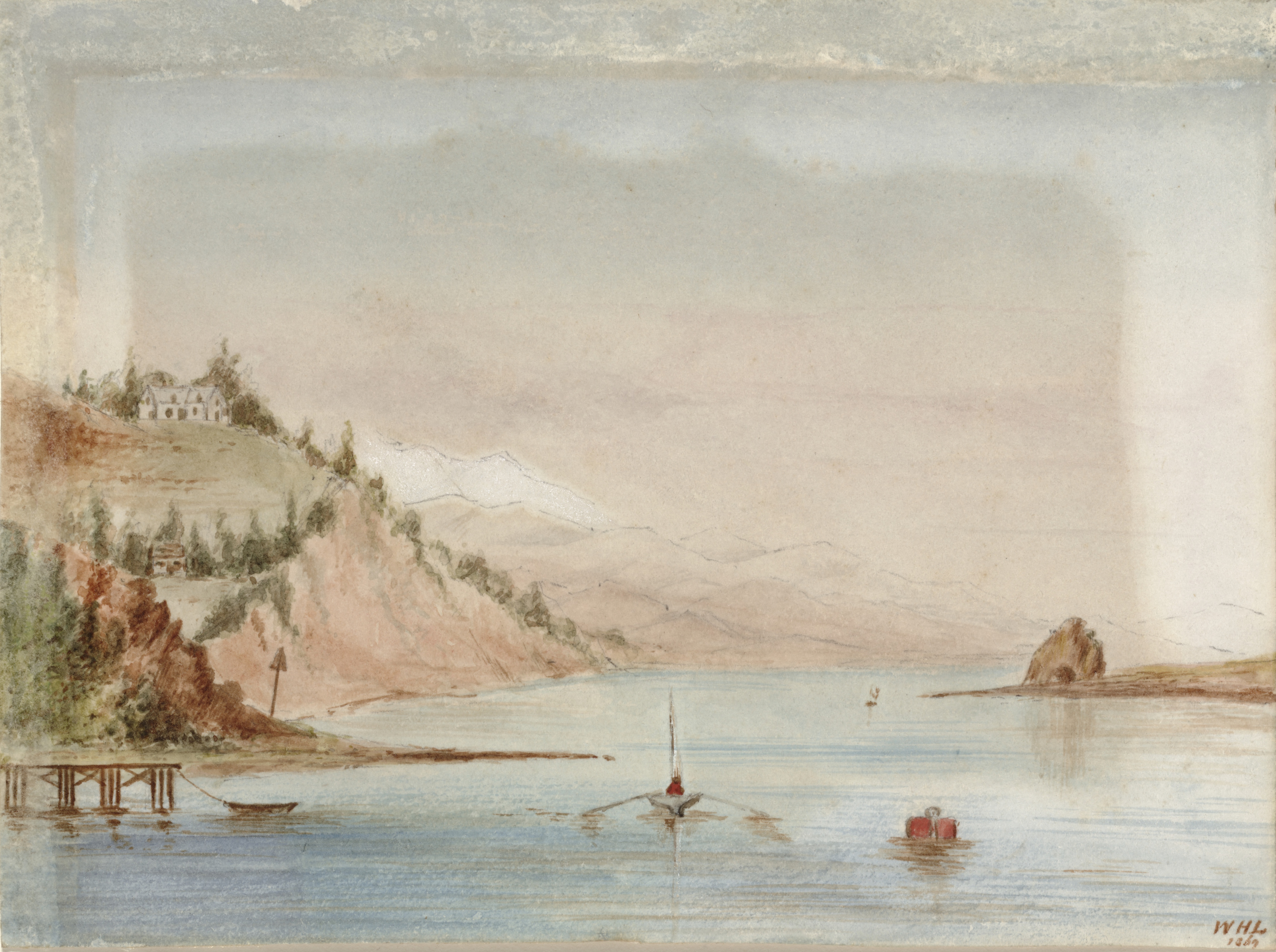
Port Nelson with Arrow Rock in 1867

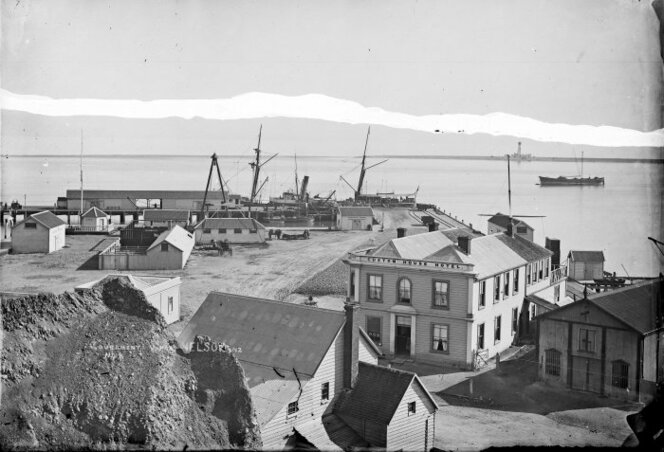
Government Wharf at Nelson, showing the Custom House Hotel Note considerable similarity of the sailing and steam rig of the rear ship with the Wanganui

At about four o'clock on the Saturday afternoon of 28 July 1866 Alexander Pinkerton, chief engineer, of the SS Otago found a body floating near the boat steps of the Government wharf at Nelson. Mr. Pinkerton pointed out the body to Alexander Lindsay, a waterman, who took his boat and dragged the body to the shore, whence it was carried to the lockup. An inquest was held at the Custom House Hotel with the Coroner, W. W. Squires, Esq. presiding during which William Hobbs said, that the last time the SS Wanganui had been in harbor, he saw a man run down the road by the Anchor Inn, and break a window there. The chief officer of the Wanganui inquired after him and was told he had run on towards the wharf the mate paid for the window. Witness went on board the Wanganui, but did not see the man Dr Francis Longbourne Vickerman a Member of the Royal College of Surgeons (M.R.C.S., London), described the appearance of the body, as having been immersed 14 or, 15 days and gave his impression was the man died from drowning. The Jury found, "That the deceased man, name unknown, was found drowned in the Nelson harbor, near the Government wharf. The evidence points to his being a seaman .belonging to the SS Wanganui steamship, supposed to have been missing since 10 July.

The inquest was later reconvened in mid-August when the SS Wanganui was back in Nelson where Robert Spark Low the Master of the SS Wanganui provided evidence. He indicated that the vessel had left at 6 o'clock on the morning of 10 July and that when he left port two men were missing from the vessel which had no right to go ashore. Their names were William Mathers and William Roach. Master Low said he had seen Roach in Wellington about three days later when he came back on board, but by then another man engaged and that he had never seen the other man (William Mathers) again On getting out to sea Master Low learnt from one of the firemen that he had heard a splash in the water as we lay at the wharf, and he told the ships pilot before he left the vessel. The fireman said he thought it might be either of the two men. He said he went with a light and looked but could not find if anyone was overboard. He heard no one cry out. He supposed it might be the man who was very drunk near the wharf the previous evening (Mathers). He was a short, dark man, with dark moustaches and beard

James Elliott the vessels fireman recounted that when they were at Akersten's wharf and that he saw Mathers going on shore about 8 o'clock in the evening of 9 July, and that he was very tipsy. He later saw Mathers in Nelson where he described him as “very drunk dancing in the bar of the Commercial Inn”. When coming down to the wharf at about 11 o'clock, he heard someone sing out someone has fallen overboard. He then got the ships lamp and searched, but saw no one and heard no splash. He looked over the side, but saw nothing. And had the mate get the lamps to look for the man. Elliott and the mate went up the road to Nelson, and not finding him gave information to the police, at the lockup, near the Government Wharf that they feared a man had fallen overboard and was drowned, and that we had searched for him in vain

==== 1866 Larceny of first steward John McKenzie ====
In early August 1866 John McKenzie (first steward) and Joseph Purcell (second steward), on board the SS Wanganui, were brought before the Resident Magistrate's Court at Wellington for Larceny. Having, on 30 July, stolen two loaves valued at two shillings. The result of the trial was that the second steward was discharged from custody before the case was concluded, and the first steward was reprimanded, as the company did not press for a conviction.

Just days later on 10 August 1866 John McKenzie alias John McDonald was again charged when Captain Robert Spark Low of the SS Wanganui alleged that he had stolen cheese of a value of £2 on or about the 27 July.

James Signall, a warehousemen in the employment of Messrs Taylor & Watt, deposed that a Port Cooper cheese weighing 29 lb was supplied for the steamer SS Wanganui. On being asked for an order (as usual) he replied that John McKenzie did not have one, but was told he would get one when the steamer returned from Wellington. In the meantime the article was entered against the Company.

George Purcell the second steward of the SS Wanganui, deposed that he had seen John McKenzie bring the cheese on board on 23 July, and put it in the ship's storeroom, where John McKenzie also kept articles of his own. On arrival at Wellington McKenzie weighed the cheese and put it in a waterman's boat and went ashore himself. McKenzie indicated that he had been in the habit of buying’ and selling goods for a large amount for himself. After having been charged for stealing loaves from the steamer in Wellington George Purcell considered it his duty to inform Captain Low of the circumstances of the cheese. John McKenzie was then sentenced to two calendar months imprisonment, with hard labour.

==== 1866 SS Wanganui race with the larger Panama, New Zealand, and Australian Royal Mail Company SS Claud Hamilton ====
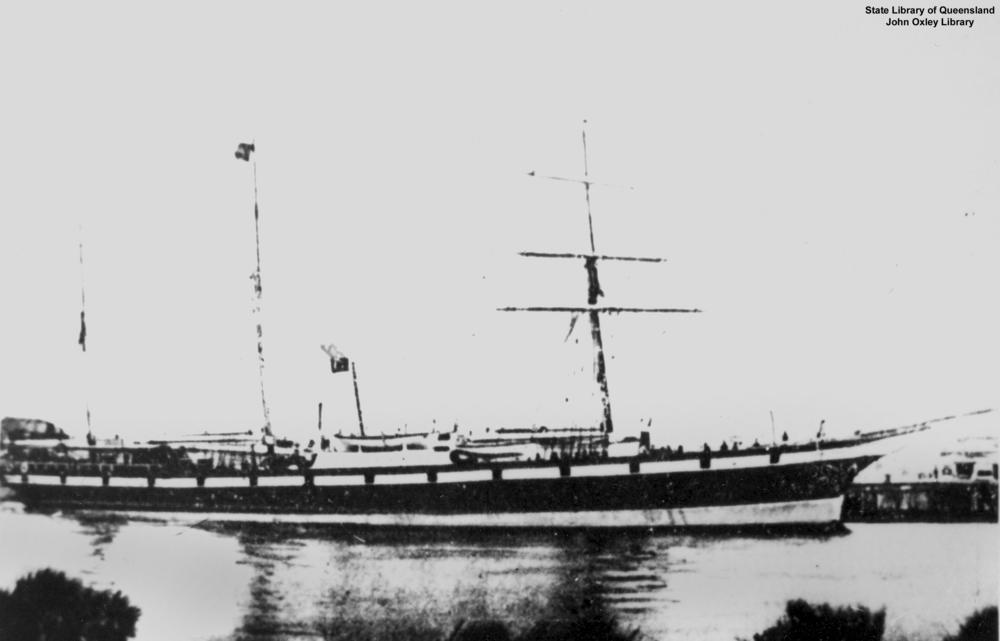
the larger Claud Hamilton which was soundly beat by the much smaller SS Wanganui

The speed of the smaller SS Wanganui 144 ft 9 in (44.12 m) 50 hp was on show when it took on the larger 200 ft 2 in (61.01 m) 100nhp Panama, New Zealand, and Australian Royal Mail Company SS Claud Hamilton on 30 October 1866. The contest had been pre-arranged between Captain Ponsonby, one of the most courteous and efficient officers in the Panama Company's service, and Captain Low, and precisely at twelve o’clock the Wanganui steamed away from the wharf at Nelson. Having cleared the Heads, the engines were stopped, and the vessel awaited her competitor. As the Claud steamed out of port, the Wanganui described a circle, and, meeting both vessels proceeded on their way, the understanding being that the race terminated at the French Pass. From the time the challenge whistle was responded to from the Wanganui until passing through the French Pass SS Wanganui amply sustained her reputation for speed, and her opponent fell an easy victim. At half-past one o’clock the Wanganui was about two miles a head of the Claud Hamilton, and when the vessels parted company at the Pass, the larger vessel was about seven miles astern. At the outset much interest was manifested by the passengers in the race, but as it became more and more apparent that the Wanganui was so easily the victor, little attention was paid to the matter even at the conclusion, and the giant Claud steamed off for Wellington after having sustained a most unmistakable defeat at the hands of her comparatively puny competitor

==== Wanganui Steam Navigation Company 1867 to 1868 ====
At the June 1867 extraordinary general meeting of Wanganui Steam Navigation Company it was reported that during the previous 6 months the SS Wanganui had made 21 trips to Wellington 21 as well as 2 trips to Nelson and an additional 2 trips to Canterbury and had recently undergone several minor repairs

On 29 November 1867 a serious accident occurred to the second mate of the SS Wanganui, while the steamer was loading at Wellington he was assisting to move a lot of corrugated iron by prizing it along with a lever, the mass sprang back and with its ragged edges inflicted a ghastly wound on the second mate's stomach and chest, almost tearing its way upwards. He was then conveyed in a litter by six of the seamen to the Wellington hospital.

During a voyage between Wanganui to Wellington on 9 December 1868 Mrs Quick, wife of Mr William Henry Quick, solicitor, of Wanganui gave birth to a son. The birth took place shortly before the steamer came alongside the Wellington wharf and was delivered by Dr Earle, of Wanganui who was by chance on board, and by last accounts both mother and child were doing well although 10 days later there was an announcement of birth of a daughter

==== Wanganui Steam Navigation Company 1869 to 1872 ====
During February 1869 The SS Wanganui made its way to Port Chalmers and remained in dock for nine days where during that time had her hull cleaned and painted, besides having one or two damaged plates replaced and a thorough overhaul executed as the vessels Sydney certificate of efficiency was due to expire on 15 March and it was necessary to have some few alterations made. On the return trip the engines worked smoothly and every satisfaction was expressed on the alterations made

On Saturday 29 May 1869 the SS Wanganui was coming into the Wanganui River and struck a sand bank opposite Putiki, during the thick fog on the night After remaining on this bank about eight days it was re floated and continued its journey. It succeeded in re floating after on the Monday and Tuesday the cargo of cattle and sheep destined for Westport, together with the ship's stores were landed to greatly reduce the load on the vessel but it reminded stranded as the tides had been at their lowest till the tides increased. This was the first mishap that has befallen Captain Linklater during the many years that he has commanded the SS Wanganui

In early July 1869 the SS Wanganui was laid up for a fortnight, for the purpose of having the boiler repaired by Mr E. W. Mills of Lion Foundry. This work consisted of an overhaul to the boiler, taking out two old plates and substituting two new ones in uptake putting in new stays in angle iron in boiler, and repairing engine and boiler

In late March 1870 a telegram was received by the ships owners, containing an account of an unfortunate accident which had happened to Mr Ryan the first engineer of the vessel, whist having some repairs done to her boiler at Port Chalmers. Mr Ryan was engaged in the repairs, and by some means not explained, was struck blind by iron getting into his eyes. He was at once removed to the hospital.

In November 1870 was once again being modified by having new coal bunkers fitted on deck and platforms in the hold for carrying cattle

In January 1872 John Fitzgerald was charged by Constable Ritchie at Wanganui with drunkenness and damaging the Constable's uniform. It was said that Fitzgerald had thrown himself off the SS Wanganui and with some difficulty managed to make it ashore where the Constable had tried to help him find lodgings for the night but failed as he crossed the bridge with the constable to try and find lodgings at the Red Lion Hotel he attempted to throw himself over and became very violent. Fitzgerald was fined £1 and costs 4s for the malicious injury to property, or one week's imprisonment.

In April 1872 Edward Smith a seaman aboard the SS Wanganui was charged with assaulting both John King, the second officer and W. H. Scoons, the acting first officer of the SS Wanganui whilst the vessel was lying at the Government Wharf at Wanganui. Smith had been working down the hold and was said to be "in liquor" and had a disagreement with John King about the cargo, King then beckoned Scoons who was on the wharf back on to the boat, Scoons when he looked down the hold saw the goods spread about. Edward Smith then left the hold and came up behind Scoons and struck him and then he rushed at King and struck him in the face with his fist, and kicked him in the side. Scoons then held him back and prevented him from continuing the assault which he said was very violent. Constable Ritchie arrested Edward Smith on board the SS Wanganui and indicated that he had been very violent and had also struck the Constable indicating he had never seen a more violent man. The magistrate said the officers of the steamer, and the police must be protected and he would deal with the prisoner severely. He Edward Smith sentenced to one month's imprisonment for assaulting John King, one month's imprisonment for assaulting W. H. Sccons and a fine of £5 or one month for assaulting the Constable.

At the half yearly meeting of the Wanganui Steam Navigation Company it revealed to the shareholders that it intended to do extensive repairs to the SS Wanganui which will necessitate her being laid up for at least two months and that in the previous 6 months between November 1871 and May 1872 the SS Wanganui completed 26 Trips between Wanganui consisting of

- 3 to Manakau
- 2 to Nelson
- 19 to Wellington
- 2 to Dunedin

==== 1872 repairs and upgrade of the SS Wanganui ====
The repairs and upgrade of the SS Wanganui were undertaken by Wanganui iron and brass foundry and engineering works Taupo Quay owned by Mr David Murray and described as of such a marked character that it much improved appearance of the steamer. The fore cabin which had formerly serviced the steerage passengers had been described as a poky closed hole after the repairs was transformed into two light, well ventilated, and comfortable cabins, capable of accommodating sixteen passengers, fitted up -with, every convenience. The bunks, lining, and floor were all new, clean, and oak grained, leaving nothing to be desired. One of the cabins can be kept separate for lady passengers if necessary

The Hold had gained extra space to give something like 29 tons additional general cargo carrying capacity, or 10 head cattle extra. One important improvement has been affected in the fore hold. Two ventilators leading from the hold through the bunkers to the Bridge have been fitted in, thus causing in the event of cattle being on board much needed ventilation.

The Bridge and Galley had received attention with new cement floors and the framing repainted and relined. The donkey engine and boiler has been lifted, repaired, and set in a new cement bed, with iron floor, thus preventing all possibility of leaking. The officers’ quarters have been shifted from below to room's cabins under the Bridge, having skylights looking on to the poop. The space occupied by them has been taken from the coal bunkers. The space under the Bridge has been so divided that if any sea was shipped forward that it cannot wash further aft than the division so the officer's berth and engine room could be kept perfectly dry. The exposed ladder that had needed to be descended from the Bridge was replaced steps leading down to the deck. The descent is now made from an opening in the fore part of the Bridge.

The after hold has been considerably extended by carrying the poop deck forward to the Bridge giving additional carrying capacity of about 33 tons. The extension caused an immense amount of work, new side plates having to be put in, with beams and angle irons, to carry the new deck. The winch was taken down and refitted on the upper deck. In addition to the large amount of extra space obtained in the hold. The length of the poop deck is increased to 60 feet straight walking.

Saloon and Ladies' Cabin was described as having “a lightness and elegance displayed in the fitting-up and decorating this portion of the vessel cannot be too highly eulogised. As far as practicable, in the gilding and painting, the original colouring and design has been adhered to. The cushions have been re-stuffed, re-corded, and re-buttoned. In the ladies' cabins, an improvement is noticeable, the old dismal dark colour of the wainscoting has been replaced by a light cheerful tint”.

The vessel was re-decked with about 7000 feet of 3-inch planking from stem to stern of splendid kauri timber and it was installed by Messrs Law and Gilmore.

Mr Murray was contracted for the boiler and engine he used the best quality of Lowmoor metal and the boiler received a complete set of new tubes, 166 in number. To enable this to be done, the boiler had to be lifted, and reset. The engines were thoroughly overhauled by the engineer Mr Cootes.

Upon completion of the works the Wanganui Steam Navigation Company invited shareholders of the company on an excursion. The Wanganui was crowded with passengers as it proceeded down to the Heads and after a trip of about 20 minutes reached the anchoring ground and luncheon was prepared by the new steward, Mr C Robinson.

It was later reported that the repairs to the SS Wanganui cost £2,073 18s. 7d

==== Winding up of the Wanganui Steam Navigation Company and subsequent Sail of the Vessel ====
In April 1872 with the SS St Kilda laid up as the Inspectors of Steamers failing to grant and extension of it Certificate until extensive repair were done. An extraordinary meeting of share holders in the Wanganui Steam Navigation Company was called at the companies offices to consider voluntarily winding up the company. With debts due to the Bank of New Zealand of £2076 7s 7d and repairs to the SS St Kilda estimated at £3100, the directors recommended winding up the company as soon as the sale of the SS Wanganui and SS St Kilda was completed. The adoption of the recommendation was carried 23 to 5 on 2 April 1872.

It was then reported that the Steamers of the Wanganui Steam Navigation Company were sold with the SS Wanganui being purchased for £8500 by Messrs Houghton and Co. of Dunedin and the SS St Kilda by Messrs John Davidson and Co for £1750. Of the 5 incompleted charters along the West Coast these were reduced to 2 where the first was to be undertaken W.S.N company whilst the final was to be undertaken by Messrs Houghton and Co. of Dunedin.

At a subsequent shareholders meeting when matters wound up after paying expenses of liquidation a sum of 7 or 8 shillings would be paid per share to the shareholders.

==== SS Wanganui involvement in the New Zealand Wars whilst owned by the W.S.N. Company ====
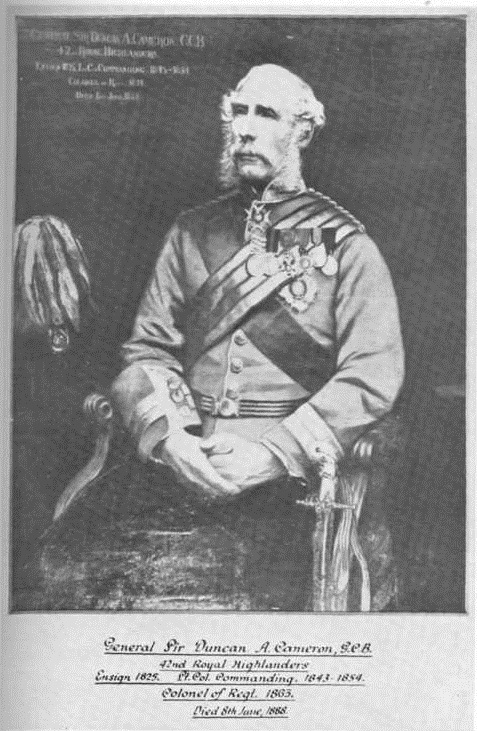
Lieut General Sir Duncan Cameron and his staff travelled aboard the Wanganui

The Wanganui was used extensively through the conflict from 1864 through to 1869 in conflicts ranging from

Second Taranaki War Cameron's West Coast campaign

Second Taranaki War Chute's forest campaign

East Cape War

Tītokowaru's War

- 29 December 1864 Military Movements – the SS Wanganui arrived in Wanganui bringing from Wellington two escorts of the 57th Regiment which had been down at that post with prisoners about to undergo sentence of Courts Martial.
- 12 January 1865 Military Movements – Lieut General Sir Duncan Cameron and staff departed from Auckland on the aboard the SS Wanganui to Wanganui
- 10 February 1865 Military Movements – Removal to Wanganui of Colonel Dwyer and all the officers and men belonging to the 14th regiment stationed at Wellington
- 23 February 1865 Military Movements Prisoners – The prisoners at Wellington were taken off to Wanganui in charge of Sergeant Mills and a guard of the 14th Regiment. They will join their respective corps there, and, probably, be tried by Court-Martial for their late mutinous conduct. Colonel Cole who has for some time been in the custody of the police as a deserter, was also taken in the steamer, as well as several soldiers of the 14th Regiment who have hitherto been on the sick-list. Ammunition. — A large quantity of ammunition was brought down from the Magazine, Mount Cook Barracks, and shipped in the SS Wanganui for conveyance to the front.
- 14 March 1865 General Charter -The Wanganui Steam Navigation Company's SS Wanganui has been chartered by the General Government, for two months, as a transport
- 22 March 1865 Military Movements – The SS Wanganui, which left the Manukau yesterday morning for Wanganui, took with her 30 horses, which were shipped on board from the Bluff on the previous day. Of the horses shipped 21 were for the Military Train, 7 for the Commissariat Transport Corps (CTC), 1 for Colonel Murant, and one for Captain Baker. The Wanganui also took as passengers Captain Spain, R.N., 2 officers, 40 privates of the Transport Corps, and 18 seamen.
- 13 October 1865 News -The SS Wanganui brings news to corroborate that "Mr. Broughton has either been most foully murdered, or he is in the hands of the fanatics. The last intelligence we received was to the effect that Mr. Broughton was missing, and there were many circumstances which led to the belief that he had fallen a victim to the treachery of the natives"
- 17 October 1865 Military Movements – Major General Chute and Staff intend proceeding to Wanganui in the SS Wanganui, to be able to give a better account of the murderers of the district.
- 30 October 1865 Military Movements – Major Von Tempsky, accompanied by some thirty men belonging to his corps, left last night in the SS Wanganui, for Wanganui where he will proceed to organise an irregular corps of Europeans and Maoris
- 29 November 1865 News -The Wanganui brought news concerning Mr. Broughton body which had been found by a party of soldiers cast up on the beach, about a mile and a half from the mouth of the Patea
- 8 March 1866 Military Movements Prisoners – The SS Wanganui was used to ship native prisoners captured on the East Coast, who are to be sent to the Chatham Islands "the Adamans of the South" under the command of Captain A. A. P. Pilmer, late lieutenant in Major Von Tempsky's corps of Rangers
- 21 April 1866 Military Movements – The SS Wanganui sailed for Auckland on Monday with two detachments of the 57th Regiment, under Sir Robert Douglas
- 28 May 1868 Military Movements – The SS Wanganui carried the remainder of the Constabulary Force, which had been stationed at Hokitika to Wanganui. The Constabulary Force were to be deployed to Patea
- 13 August 1868 Military Movements – The War Minister The Hon. Colonel Haultain arrived in Wanganui via the SS Wanganui
- 24 September 1868 Military Movements – The SS Wanganui carried twelve men who were returned from the conflict to Auckland after having stopped in Taranaki, and Wanganui the twelve men, had been part of Captain Page's company and whose term of service was up and who had refused to serve any longer stating they did not have the "having no stomach for further fighting"
- 30 September 1868 Military Movements – The SS Wanganui brought many of the wounded from Tītokowaru's War who belong to Taranaki from Wanganui
- 5 November 1868 Military Movements – About 127 men belonging to the Armed Constabulary arrived at Wellington in the SS Wellington from Auckland on Tuesday morning, under the command of Capt Roberts many of them show signs that they have seen service, and their commanding officer served under Von Tempsky at Waikato in the Forest Rangers and made way from Wellington to Wanganui aboard the SS Wanganui in charge of Major St John. They proceeded to the front at once, but before doing so, were paraded on Taupo Quay.
- 22 December 1868 Military Movements – An additional 147 men arrived by the SS Wanganui to join the Armed Constabulary, in charge of Major M’Barnet. They were principally from Melbourne, being part of the contingent now raising in Victoria by Capt. Stack. They came to Wellington in the Alhambra.
- 29 December 1868 News – James Black who was a Constabulary recruit was charged with assaulting Major M'Barnett on board the SS Wanganui. Major M'Barnett deposed that on the evening of 19 December, he saw the prisoner fighting with a knife in his hand on board the Wanganui, and the moment he saw the knife he seized the prisoner, and after a little scuffle, he threw the knife, overboard, and prisoner was taken to the lock-up. There was no other evidence brought against the prisoner, and as he produced excellent testimonials in his favor, and had already been in confinement for more than a week, the charge was dismissed with costs
- 16 January 1869 Military Movements – The SS Wanganui carried Colonel Whitmore and Captain Skeet with a cargo were two Cohorn mortars, 96 shells, 36 kegs of ammunition, 1 barrel of powder, and sundry military stores from Wellington to Wanganui
- 26 November 1869 The Hon. Mr Fox arrived in Wanganui via the SS Wanganui, and purposes attending the meeting of natives to he held at Pipiriki, at which the question of peace and the future relations between the races will he discussed. A friendly disposition seems to be growing up among the hitherto "neutral" natives, and the Government are leaving no stone unturned to arrive at a common agreement by which a permanent peace may be established.

=== Messrs Henry Houghton and Co., of Dunedin 1873 to 1880 ===
==== Fire in the Engine Room ====
Whist at anchor alongside the wharf at the Bluff on 18 December 1873 at about 9.30 p.m., a railway porter, who was acting as watchman over goods which had been landed on the wharf (through want of storage accommodation) for the Wanganui and Albion gave the alarm of fire. The bells on the ships began ringing as smoke was seen rising from the engine room of the Wanganui. Before the buckets and hands could be got to use the water, flames began issuing from the vessels skylight. After 20 minutes hard work, the flames were got under control. It was assessed that the damage is not serious, all the woodwork about the engine room, the officers' quarter, and the poop deck is charred. Whilst the engines are apparently not damaged as she got up stream at six the following morning, and sailed for Riverton at seven, the fire would have proved very serious had it happened an hour later, as most of the crews belonging to the vessels would have been in bed, they having rendered every assistance, which no doubt saved the vessel. The fire is said to have originated in the mate's room from a kerosene lamp. Captain Fraser and the chief mate worked like tigers to get the flames under control. Captain McLean, of the Albion, was quickly on the spot with his men and buckets, rendering valuable assistance, as also the men and officers of the ship Bebington.

==== Collision in Port Chalmers Harbour ====
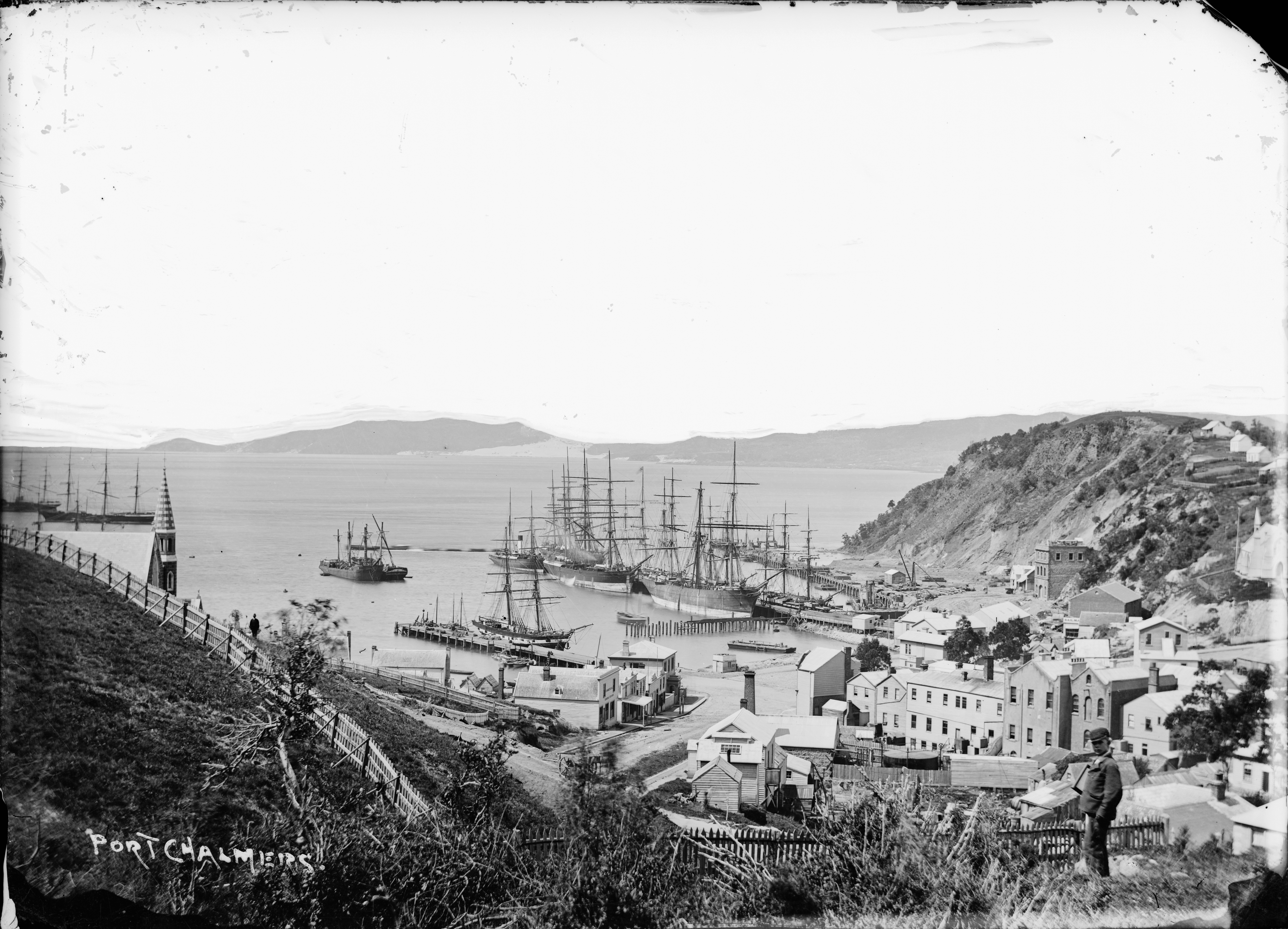
Port Chalmers in the 1870s. Note the steamer at the end of the wharf which looks remarkably similar to the SS Wanganui.

At about midnight on the night of 3 December 1877 the SS Wanganui was coming up the harbour to the Rattray street wharf when it suddenly saw the brigantine Ethel, which, was claimed to having no light up, the order to put the helm hard a starboard, but before it could clear the vessel the steamer collided with the Ethel. The steamer's bow hit the brigantine on the starboard side. The steamer's bow was right on towards the steamer with the Ethel's anchor fouling the Wanganui. The engines were stopped, and the foul cleared. The whole thing occupied only a few minutes. The steamer was considerably damaged. Her bulwarks were smashed, hawser pipe broken, the bow injured, three angle-irons carried away, and other damage done.

Edward Ohlson was the lamp trimmer on board the SS Wanganui and was at the steamer's helm at the time of the collision. He stated that about a minute before the collision witness received the order "Hard a-starboard," which order he obeyed. John Marks a seaman collaborated that there was no light on the brigantine at the time of the collision. When the mate sang out "Where's the light?" somebody brought a light and said "Here it is." It was probable the light was brought from the cabin. George Skidmore, steward, said there was no light on the vessel when the steamer struck her, but one was in the rigging about three minutes later.

Thomas King, master of the lighter Agnes, was also arriving near the wharf at midnight and observed the Ethel he passed it on the port side, and saw no light. In passing her about five minutes past 12, and when just past the vessel, saw a faint light, almost out; it appeared to be on the vessel's galley.

==== Mutiny on the barque Aline ====
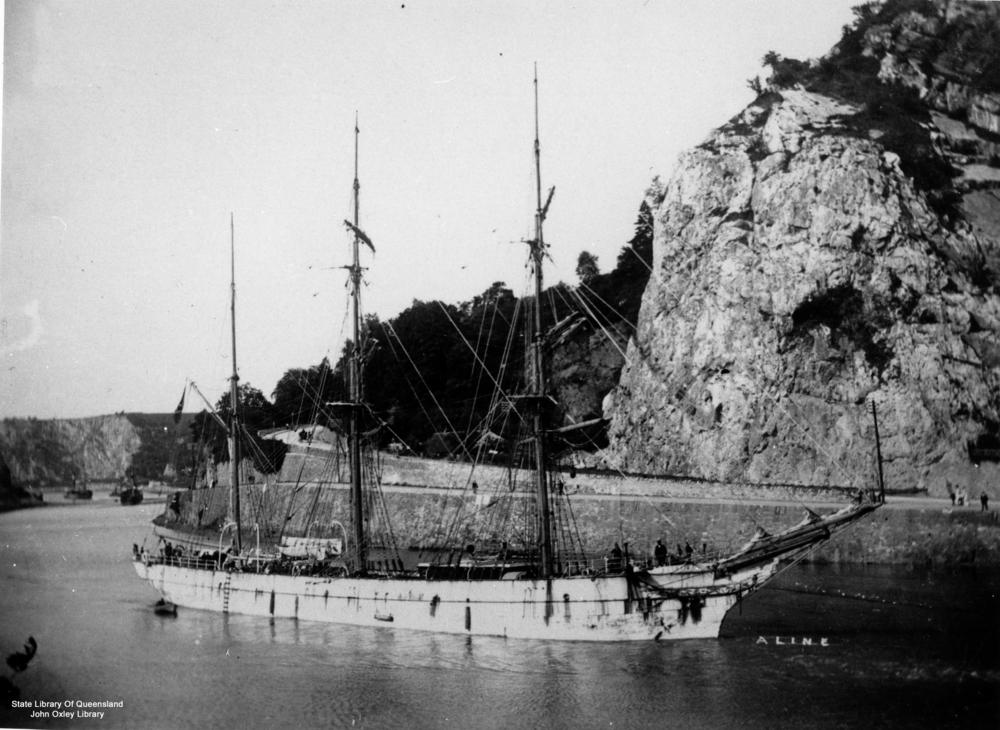
The barque Aline in the River Avon

On 25 September 1878 The SS Wanganui ran alongside the barque Aline to tow her to sea, when the crew of the Aline headed by the officers, took charge of the fore-castle head and mutinied, refusing to proceed to sea with the captain. The crew would not allow the anchor to be weighed. They have three times been before the Magistrate for refusing duty, and ordered on board or imprisonment at the Captain's option.

==== Transport of the Native contingent of Armed Constabulary February 1880 ====
The Native contingent of Armed Constabulary left Wellington on Monday 9 February 1880 aboard the SS Wanganui The detachment numbered 32 men, belonging to the Ngāti Porou iwi to be deployed a further reinforcement of the Constabulary in that district and to relieve the garrison at White Cliffs, so that the White Cliffs garrison would be free to begin road making on Waimate Plains from the northern end.

==== Henry Houghton shipowner insolvency ====
On 3 May 1880 a legal notice was bankruptcy appeared for the Supreme Court of New Zealand Otago and Southland district appeared that Henry Houghton, of Dunedin, steamship-owner, had filed a statement that he is unable to meet his engagements with his Creditors. The First Meeting of Creditors was held at the Supreme Courthouse, Dunedin, on the tenth day of May 1880. By 19 May 1880 the a debtor, Mr Sinclair applied for confirmation of a resolution of creditors passed at the first meeting to change the bankruptcy to a deed of assignment. The resolution was confirmed

=== Australian Agents Messrs Nipper & See 1880 to Sinking ===
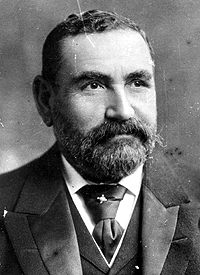
Sir John See part owner of Nipper & See and later Premier of New South Wales

The SS Wanganui arrived in Sydney on 5 April 1880 under Captain Thomas C. Bayldon the ship had left Dunedin on Tuesday, 16 March, calling at all coast ports to Greymouth, where after coaling it departed on the 30th at noon and then arriving in Neutral Bay In change of Pilot Cootts

The vessel had come over to Australia under offer to the Clarence and Richmond River Steam Navigation Company but negotiations for the vessels sale fell through.

The vessel was then placed into the Australian trade under Messrs Nipper & See who intended to run the vessel in conjunction with the Lubra on the Clarence River to Sydney trade at what was described as very low fares as there was now 5 ocean going vessels plying this route with the vessel first arriving from Sydney in Grafton on 17 May 1880 under command of Captain TC Bayldon who had up to then been running the vessel in New Zealand.

The Wanganui was described as having accommodation of a very comfortable character suitable for 40 gentlemen, and a separate cabin for eight ladies and carried both steward and stewardess with the saloon fare of £2 single and £3 return ticket whilst steerage was £1 and £1 15s for a return ticket

The steamer Wanganui was placed into service to leave Sydney every Friday night for Grafton and then depart Grafton on each Tuesday morning

By May 1880 the competition in the Clarence river steam trade was becoming particularly keen and a further reduction in the rate of passage to Sydney was announced by Messrs. Nipper and See at the following rates – Saloon single- fare £1 10s., return ticket £2 10s. – Steerage single fare 15s., return ticket 25s. The steerage fare is less than one penny per mile for the distance to Sydney.

== Shipwreck event 20 June 1880 ==
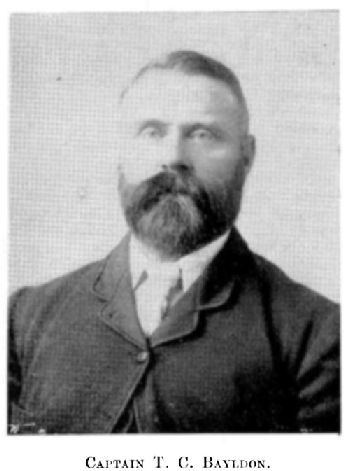
Thomas Cook Bayldon Captain of the Wanganui at the time of the sinking

The Wanganui left Sydney at 9pm Friday 18 June 1880. The vessel then called in at Newcastle en route at 6am Saturday, loading coal for her own consumption, as well as taking in some cargo for Grafton and left Newcastle at 6.30pm on Saturday afternoon.

She arrived off the Clarence at 10 o'clock on Sunday night 20 June 1880, and it being a fine night with a clear moon, and the captain seeing the beacons plainly, it was considered safe to enter. The steamer passed the reef buoy at a quarter to 11, when the ebb tide, which was making out strong, caught the steamer on the starboard bow, and before she could recover herself she went broadside on to the reef, where she remained about an hour.

In the meantime, the crew got the boats clear and ready for lowering, but the captain waited for half an hour, thinking his vessel would harden, and that at slack water he would be able to land the passengers and crew better than on a strong ebb tide. About 11 O'clock Mr Arthur Hood Pegus, Custom-house officer, came off and advised Captain Bayldon to land every one as soon as possible, as the steamer might tumble suddenly into deep water. At this time the engine-room was nearly full of water. The passengers, 13 in number, including Mr Pittman, of the Mines' Department, and the stewardess, who was asleep when the steamer struck, were then sent ashore in Mr Pegus's boat and the ship's starboard boat.

Mr Pegus returned to the steamer, and just then she commenced to slew head up west, and, the tide catching her port bow, she slid suddenly off the reef, when the cry was raised that she was going down head foremost. At this juncture every one remaining on board, including the captain, who exhibited much coolness throughout, got into Mr Pegus's boat, and the steamer, drifting fast with the tide, struck the reef buoy smashing the boat, containing 10 persons and what few ship's effects had been got together. Mr Pegus, the captain, Mr Woods, the chief officer, and four others saved their lives by jumping and catching hold of the steamer's rails.

Two of the crew and Mr. Freeburn, of the Customs' crew, were precipitated into the sea. The two former have not yet been found, and no doubt they are drowned. Young Freeburn was discovered on the beach, much exhausted. He had been three hours in the water, and the night was bitterly cold. He is now in a precarious state. As soon as he got on the steamer the captain let go the starboard anchor, but shortly afterwards the cable parted and the ship commenced drifting towards the north beach. The lifeboat was then got out, and everyone on board got into it, as they believed nothing could prevent the steamer going into the north rock breakers. The boat left, and was pulled to leeward of the breakwater, and while going ashore the steamer was found to have cleared the rocks. The ship's starboard boat returning from the shore was hailed by the captain, who, with Mr Woods and four of the crew, returned to the steamer and found the pilot on board. The captain immediately set sail and headed the Wanganui south, after which he inspected her below and found the engine-room full of water. There was no water in the cabin, but the floor of the fore cabin was slightly submerged. It was found that the after sluice valve was closed, and the fore one partially so. The latter was at once screwed tight, and the crew then started the forward bilge pump. The captain requested the pilot to proceed ashore to procure the assistance of the Government tug Cyclops, to tow the Wanganui in, but just before the pilot could start Mr Pittman and three of the crew came out in a spare pilot boat, in the hope of picking up the missing men. They went on board, and from this out the bilge pump was kept going. All on board longed for daylight and steam tug assistance.

At the break of day the steam tug Cyclops came out and picked up the Wanganui about two miles at sea, and had towed her in about a mile when she suddenly went down, head first, in eight fathoms of water. Nothing can be seen but her topmasts. The stern, when foundering, went clean into the air, showing fully 20 feet of keel. The captain was the last man to leave, and, with Mr Pittman and some of the crew, did so only a few minutes before the foundering. The Wanganui carried a large general cargo, but nothing except a case of gin, some casks of beer, and a few packages were saved up to 5 o'clock on Monday after noon. Search parties went out looking for the bodies of the drowned men, who were named respectively Henry Norton and Thomas Anderson, but nothing has been seen of them. It was fully six hours after the Wanganui struck before she foundered.

The vessel was insured in the National Insurance Company for £3500, of which £3000 is re-insured.

=== Marine Court of Enquiry into the Shipwreck ===
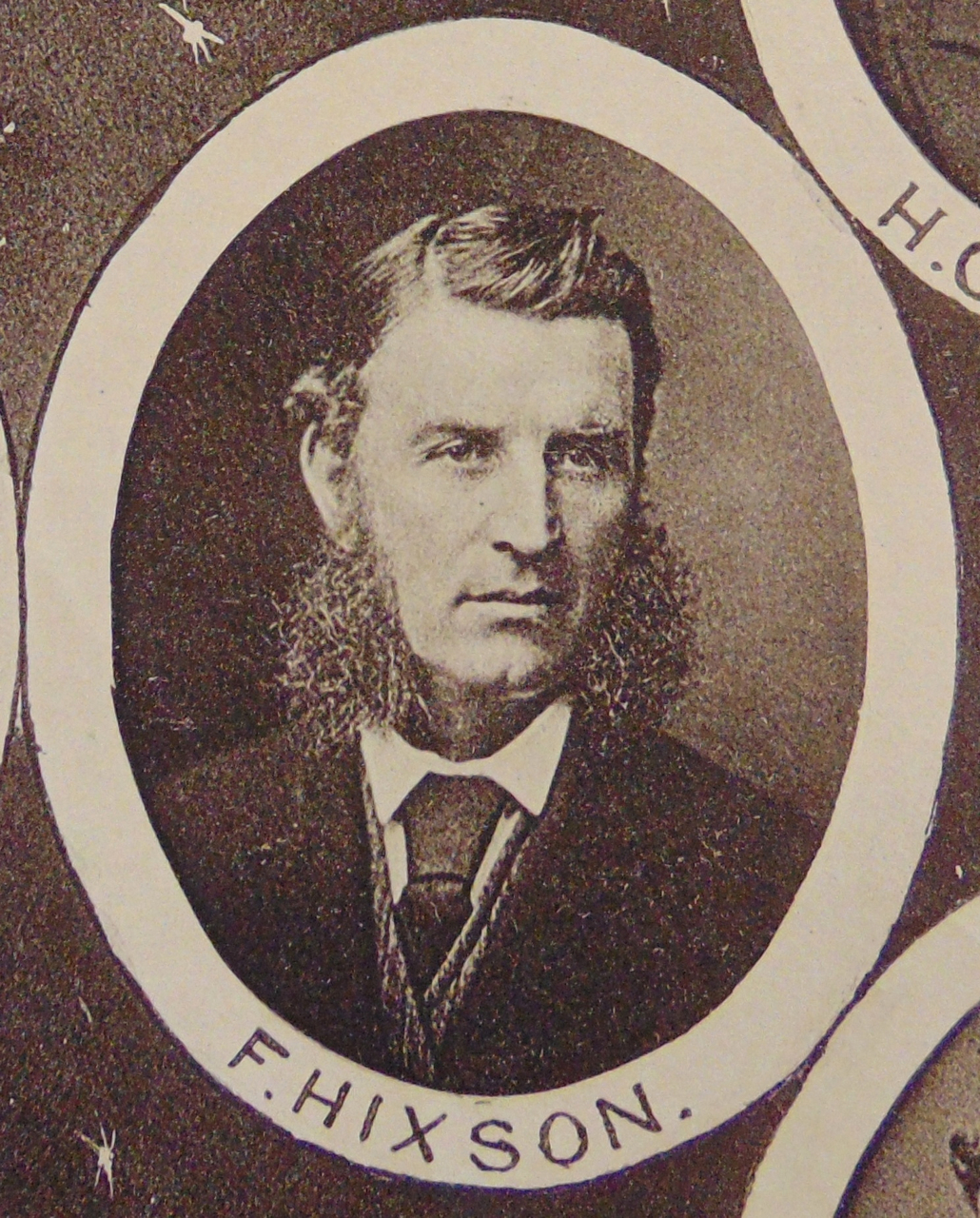
Captain Francis Hixson president the Sydney Marine Board

A Marine Court of Enquiry was conducted on Thursday morning 1 July 1880 at the Sydney Marine Board Office conducted by Captain Francis Hixson (president), Captain John Broomfield, Captain Benjamin Jenkins, Captain William Robertson, and Captain Fox, Lieutenant George Sidney Lindeman (secretary).

After hearing the evidence and deliberating it was found that the vessel was lost through the wrongful act or default of Thomas Cook Bayldon, the master, for attempting to enter the Clarence River at night time, and at an improper time of tide In connection with this they summoned him to appear before them at 2 p m that day to show cause win his certificate us master should not be suspended or cancelled At this subsequent meeting of the Board, Baylden's certificate was suspended for three months

=== Location of the Shipwreck ===
The location of the wreck site is variously described as

Captain Bayldon, in one of his boats, with a crew went after the steamer, and managed to sail the steamer clear of the breakers four miles and then held her with a kedge anchor. Then the tug was given in charge of the pilot, who went out at daylight and fastened on to the Wanganui, and towed her within a mile of the Heads, when she suddenly went down head first in eight fathoms of water leaving only part of her topmasts out of water.

Additionally

At the break of day the Cyclops came out and picked up the Wanganui about two miles at sea, and had towed her in about a mile when she suddenly went down, head first, in eight fathoms of water. Nothing can be seen but her topmasts. The stern, when foundering, went clean into the air, showing fully 20 feet of keel

As accounted by William Burghardy a member of the Yamba Pilot's crew

We reached the Wanganui at about daybreak, and at once got a line on hoard and towed her about two miles, when about three-quarters of a mile from the bar she began to settle down by the head and shortly afterwards foundered.

In November 1880 it was said that

a few feet above the ocean waters, may still be seen the masts of the ill-fated Wanganui
