= William Henry Quick =

New Zealand businessman and politician

William Henry Quick (15 October 1843 – 13 September 1911) was a New Zealand businessman, politician, and solicitor. He was born in Sierra Leone, and received education at Horton College in Ross, Tasmania. His father, Rev W. A. Quick, was afterwards president there. Quick became a solicitor in 1866, and then came immediately to New Zealand. He was a member of the Wellington City Council for the Lambton Ward from 1884–1887.

== Career ==
He practiced as a solicitor first in Whanganui before doing so in Wellington. From 1906 to 1911 he was a director of the Bank of New Zealand.

== Later life ==
Quick died on 13 September 1911 aged 67. He was outlived by his father who died later in 1915 as the oldest Methodist minister in the world.
