= Holy Island Waggonway =

C19 industrial transport system in Northumberland, England

Coordinates: 55.68154°N 1.78393°W

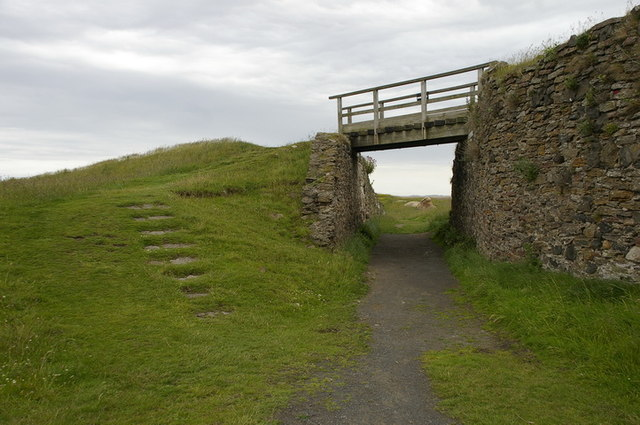
- Former tramway bridge, looking north. (Note: Nessend Quarry limestone arrived from the right, overhead. Product departed at ground level from behind the camera, bearing left beyond the bridge, passing the castle to the 1861–83 jetties.)

Overview
- Locale: Lindisfarne
- Dates of operation: 1846–1883

Technical
- Track gauge: 2 ft (610 mm)

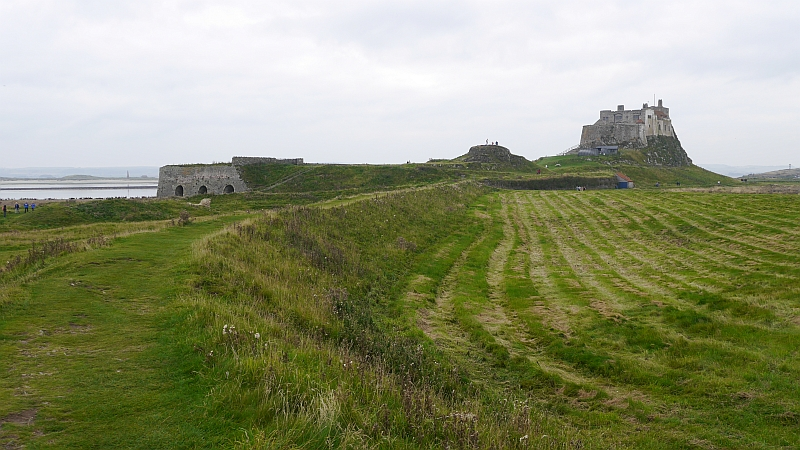
Eastern tramway embankment and Castle Point Limekilns

The Holy Island Waggonway (sometimes referred to as the Holy Island Tramway) was a network of waggonways across the island of Lindisfarne, Northumberland, England.

The earliest two lines connected limestone quarries at the northern end of the island with lime kilns and a tidal jetty in waters known as The Basin, northwest of Lindisfarne Priory. A third line down the eastern side of the island eventually replaced the earlier routes. It was built to connect the remaining quarry with new kilns and a pair of new jetties near Lindisfarne Castle.

The waggonways had all fallen into disuse by the middle of the 1880s.

== Early works ==
Lime burning on Lindisfarne was first recorded in 1344, though the process itself has been used for over four thousand years. The scale of the operation before the industrial revolution was small, with the product used locally. Geography and unenclosed land ownership inhibited ambition and opportunity, Lindisfarne was then and remains a semi-island remote from centres of population and industry. Limestone deposits extended to the neighbouring mainland, so the island had no natural advantage to exploit. The island in the 18th century was characterised by "grinding poverty, emigration, lawlessness and a decline in population."

== Industrialisation ==
In the process of enclosure on Lindisfarne in the 1790s "…the agricultural potential of the land was increased, and its value was estimated to have increased eightfold." This, the climate of the times and the presence on the island of industrialisation's key drivers – coal and iron – brought about radical change.

There are thin seams of poor quality coal to the north of the island which have been used over the years. Attempts were made to mine this on a significant scale in the early 19th century. Costs, quality and quantity meant this ultimately came to nothing as cheap, accessible coal became readily available elsewhere. Some coal used in the nineteenth century was brought in by ship from Scotland, but the majority was shipped in from further south in Northumberland.

Though dating before the island's waggonways, iron ore was mined on the island and shipped to Falkirk in the early 19th century. Like coal, this petered out as better ore became much more readily and cheaply available elsewhere.

These industrial activities acted as spurs to pursue the island's lime workings. The fact that Lindisfarne is an island had inhibited lime production when markets were small and local, but, conversely, with industrial scale processes and industrial scale markets in view, the island's natural south side harbour gave it the same advantage afforded by rivers and canals – a means of getting the product to customers on an industrial scale.

== St Cuthbert's Limeworks waggonway ==
The Lord of the Manor, John Selby, wrote to the Crown Commissioners on 21 December 1839 seeking their support to install steam-powered quarrying machinery, erect modern kilns, a sea jetty and a railway to connect them, with the intention of supplying local needs and pursuing "sea sale". Correspondence, inspections and reports passed back and forth until 31 May 1842, when the Commissioners recommended to the Treasury that the Crown pay for the pier and Mr Selby pay for the rest. An enthusiastic report in the Berwick and Kelso Warder newspaper on 25 July 1846 said that construction work had begun in 1845 and production had started at "St Cuthbert's Lime Works" earlier in the year, with several shiploads of lime already sent to Dundee and other Scottish destinations. The report also states that island coal was used. The scale of the operation was modest; the 1851 Census shows just eight men involved in lime works.

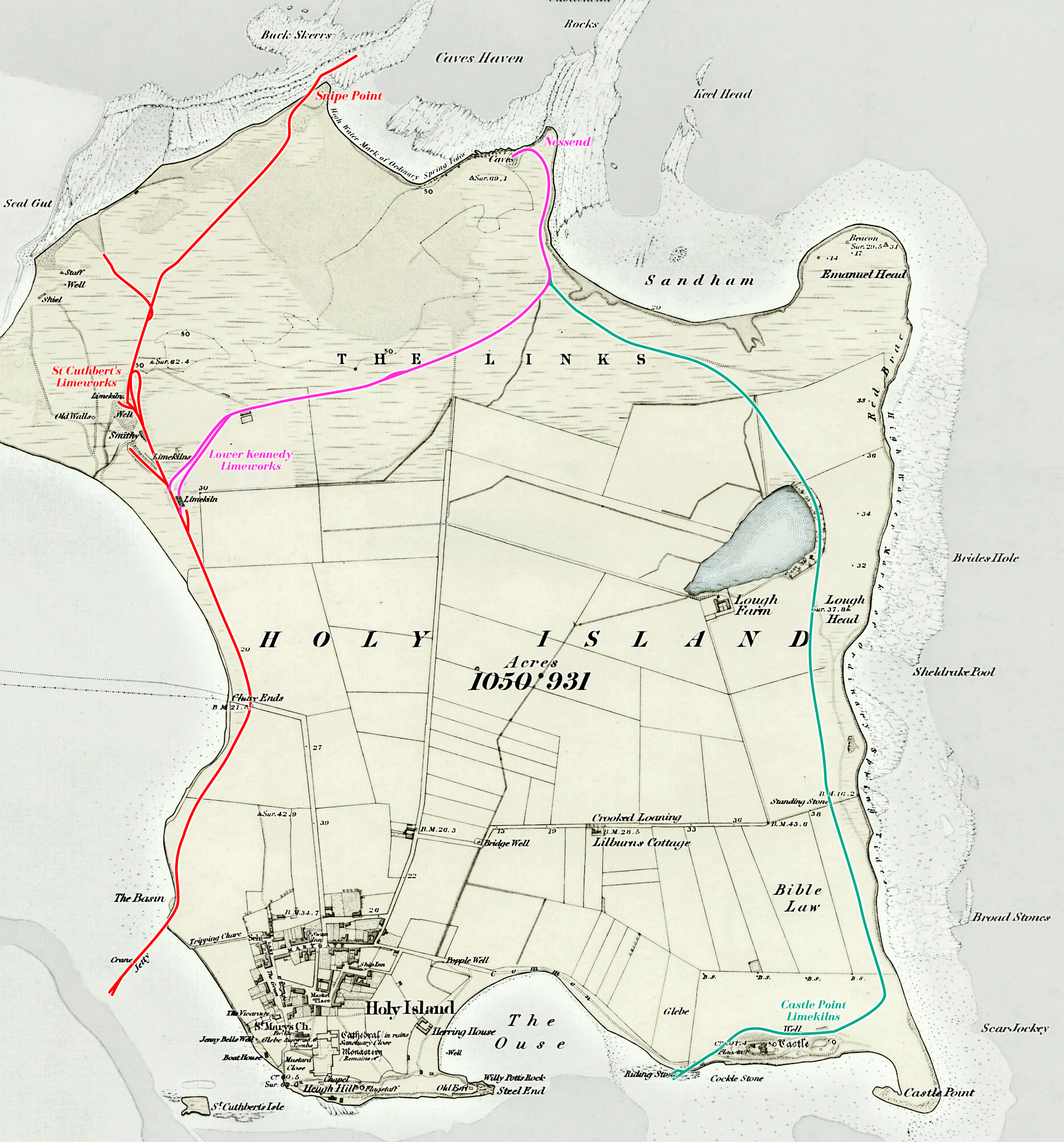
Map 1: The waggonways of St Cuthbert's Limeworks on the west coast (red), from Nessend Quarry to Lower Kennedy (pink) and from Nessend to Castle point on the east coast (cyan)

St Cuthbert's Limeworks are shown, but not named as such, on Map 1, the OS map surveyed in 1860. (Note: Map 1: St Cuthbert's Limeworks are shown immediately north west of the "H" in the largest superimposed letters of "Holy Island" on the 1860 6" OS map showing the earlier waggonways to a jetty on the SW of the island, via National Library of Scotland.) These works are collectively labelled "Lime Works" and are individually labelled as "Well", "Smithy", "Limekiln" and "Limekilns". The standard work on the waggonways argues that the zigzag structure labelled "Limekilns" were not kilns at all, but storage bays for finished and semi-finished product where lime could be slaked. The building labelled "Old Walls" was not part of the works. The active kilns consisted of the two "pots" labelled "Limekiln".

The lower building labelled "Limekiln" (Note: Map 1: The Limekiln is shown immediately south of the large letter H.) was not part of the St Cuthbert Limeworks, but was the later, short-lived Lower Kennedy works described below. The waggonway passing northeast was also a later addition connected with the Lower Kennedy scheme. (Note: Map 1: The Lower Kennedy Waggonway passes through the large letter H.)

Map 1 shows that by 1860, if not initially, the waggonway to St Cuthbert's works included a long approach ramp from the quarries to the north joined by an approach ramp from the jetty to the south which curved through 180 degrees to meet the former at the top of the kilns, enabling them to be gravity fed with limestone and coal. This implies that, by then if not earlier, locally won coal was insufficient for the task. Tracks heading south from the kilns show no embanking, implying that the product was emptied at ground level and taken away to the stores mentioned above or to the jetty.

Continuing south along the waggonway, it made a level crossing with the road from the village at Chare Ends, immediately east of where it crossed the High Water Mark and became the traditional causeway to the mainland at Beal. That traditional causeway is nowadays commonly referred to as the "Pilgrim's Path". In 1954 a second, much shorter metalled causeway was opened between Beal and the Snook. This, in turn, was joined to Chare Ends by a metalled road in 1966. By 2015 the waggonway trackbed northwards from the site of the level crossing was a public footpath.

Continuing south, the waggonway hugged the western coast until it reached a jetty just north of Tripping Chare, in an area known to seafarers as The Basin. The jetty was wooden and had a crane. It can be seen to fork to two tracks at its seaward end. Ships would only be able to berth or sail at high tide.

Two of the first waggonway's northern extremities can be seen on the north end of Map 1. The more westerly (which is the middle of the three shown on the southerly map) approaches "Seal Gut"; it and its western neighbour were known collectively as "Acre Quarries", though this name is not shown on the map. The right hand line continues beyond the Mean High Water mark at Snipe Point onto rocks which are submerged at some times, some even daily. This posed operational challenges and limited productivity. The workings here were known as Coves Quarry, though this name is not shown on the map. Confusingly, at least one official document later in the century refers to workings at Nessend Quarry as "Coves Head Quarry".

Clear dates when St Cuthbert's Limeworks, the quarries to its north and the joining waggonways closed have not been unearthed, but all limewinning at Coves and Acre quarries had passed to Nessend Quarry by 1861. Limeburning was, by inference, taking place at Lower Kennedy by 1860, but that does not preclude the possibility of work continuing at St Cuthbert's with lime brought from Nessend to Lower Kennedy then reversing. The closure period on evidence published thus far is therefore between 1859–61.

== Nessend Quarry to Lower Kennedy waggonway ==
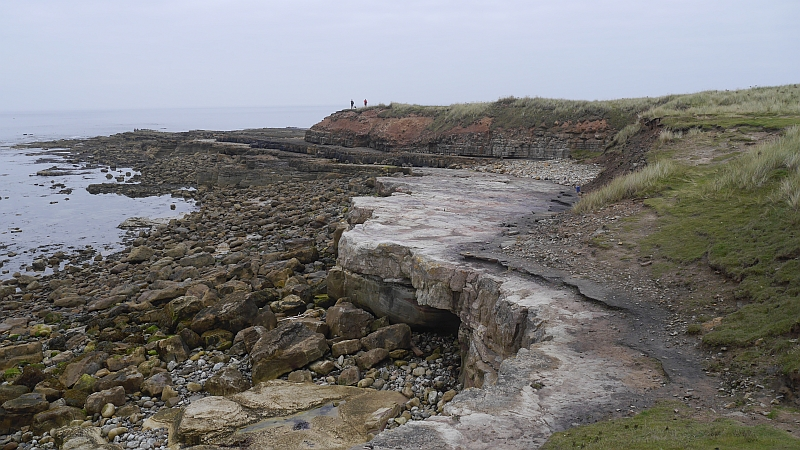
Lime stone layer at Nessend

The scale of operations and infrastructure associated with St Cuthbert's Limeworks represented a step change on centuries of practice; Nessend Quarry and Lower Kennedy represented a further leap, but also a business error. Nessend Quarry was safe from the sea and more economical to work than Coves and Acre Quarries, though the damage to the caves in the limestone was criticised by at least one writer. A waggonway connecting it to the 1846 jetty a short distance south of St Cuthbert's Limeworks was first shown on an Admiralty chart dated "c1855".

In 1856 John Selby applied to renew his Lordship of the Manor, which was due to expire in 1858. When this succeeded he agreed to lease land and permission to a lime merchant named John Nicholl, of Dundee. This lease was to last for 21 years from Michaelmas 1858. For this Nicholl was to pay an annual rent of £250 plus 2 pence per ton of lime "made and burnt" in excess of 5000 tons per year. The term "made and burnt" is unclear, but making one ton of quicklime usually requires two tons of limestone.

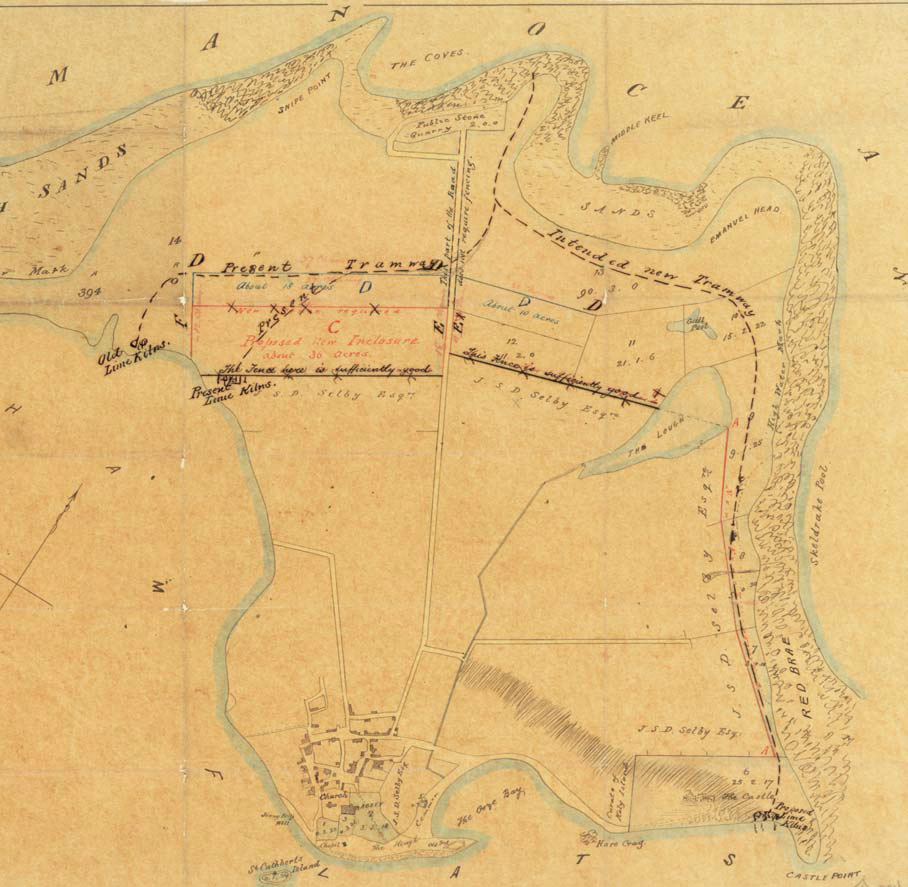
Map 2: Old and proposed new lime works on John Higgins’ map of 1860

Nicholl "would appear to have entered into his Holy Island enterprise with some alacrity but perhaps insufficient caution" as he was reported in March 1860 to have received permission from the Admiralty to build kilns near Castle Point in the south east of the island. This was an ambitious move to a good site, but he had already built a substantial three-pot kiln at Lower Kennedy at the cost of several hundred pounds. As with the St Cuthbert's operation, clear opening and closing dates may never be unearthed, but Map 2 dated 8 March 1860 shows the later Castle Point kilns as "proposed" and the Lower Kennedy kilns as "present." The Berwick Advertiser started to publish Holy Island sailings, starting with the 302-ton Brigantine Isabella, which left with a cargo of lime for Dundee on 14 April 1860, returning nine days later laden with coal for the kilns. This report does not indicate whether the ship used the older jetty near Tripping Chare or the new pair near the castle.

Allowing for the Lower Kennedy kilns and associated top feed waggonway embankment to be built after Michaelmas 1858 and for the Castlepoint kilns, the new jetties and the joining waggonway to be built after March 1860 the period over which the Lower Kennedy waggonway was worked was likely to have been 1855–61 as a through route and 1858–61 to serve the Lower Kennedy kilns. No photographs of operations at Lower Kennedy have been found, but an artist's impression has been drawn by Peter Westley.

The literature is unclear why Nicholl left the Lower Kennedy site so quickly. Two reasons are alluded to, firstly, that he acted hastily, and would have done better if he had done more research then gone for the superior Castle Point site straight away; or, secondly, that he built the Lower Kennedy kilns on land where he had no right to be.

Whatever the timing and sequence of events, only the censuses conducted in 1851, 1861, 1871 and 1881 show anyone clearly working in the lime trade on the island. The Spring 1861 census shows more than double the number of men of any other year. According to the 1861 census, 35 men worked at the lime kilns and the quarries and many of them lived in a new village, which had developed around the quarries. By 1871 the business had already declined, with 11 men employed at the quarries and 9 at the kiln. Looking at recorded occupations such as "Labourer – Limeworks" probably under-represents the numbers in the industry as, for example, there appears to be an unusually high number of carters for a small community. Dominant occupations in 1861 concerned the sea, with fishermen, pilots and herring workers to the fore. In 1861 a number of men, together with two families lived at "The Limeworks". It is unclear from maps or the census exactly where this accommodation was, but the sequence of enumeration visits suggests it was near the Castle Point works.

== Nessend Quarry to Castle Point tramway ==
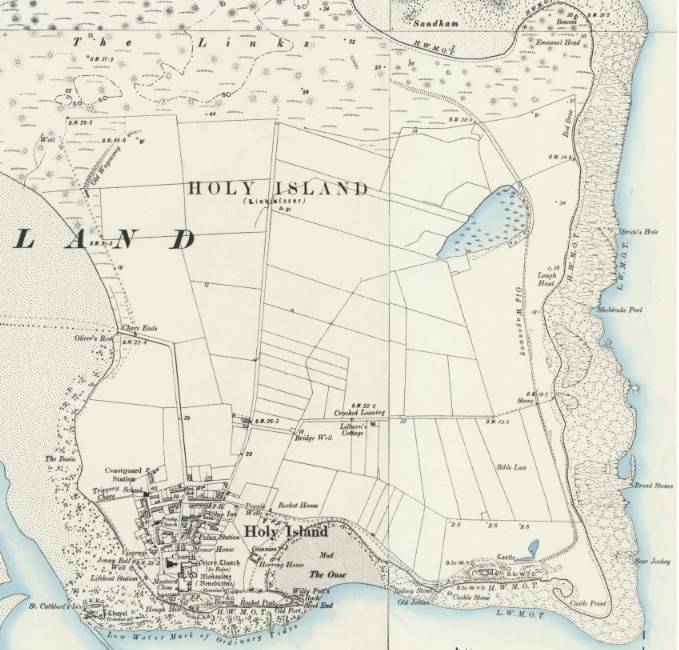
Map 3: Route of the eastern tramway

Castle Point lime kilns

The names for the railways evolved over time, with waggonway segueing into wagonway into tramway. The third and final tramway on the east coast was the longest lasting and left the clearest remains into the 21st century.

Nicholl's ambitions led him to build Lower Kennedy Limeworks and abandon the early quarries and St Cuthbert's Limeworks about 1858. After a brief, expensive period working Lower Kennedy he obtained Admiralty permission to build new kilns and two parallel jetties near the castle and to connect them to Nessend Quarry by a wholly new tramway down the east of the island, abandoning Lower Kennedy, the 1846 jetty and all trackwork, though he may have recycled some materials. This took place around 1861. Map 2 gives hints of his evolving aspirations at the time.

Standard Ordnance Survey (OS) maps were surveyed in 1860 then in 1898. 1860 maps predate the eastern tramway and the later maps were produced fifteen years after the line was closed and lifted. The OS County Series, Northumberland 1898 1:2,500 map gives a good idea of the layout around the kilns and castle, but does not clearly convey the "grade separated" nature of the tramways designed to feed coal and limestone to the top of the kilns and take end product away at ground level; this unclarity comes about because the tracks had long been lifted and the rock outcrop on which the castle stands confuses natural and man made slopes. The standard work includes a series of photographs and reproduces two maps, both devised for other purposes, which give the overall idea, but the maps either lack detail or make small errors.

Castle Point Limekilns had six pots, double those at Lower Kennedy. No contemporary photographs of any lime trade activities on the island are known to exist, but images of two paintings by Ralph Hedley are attached; one is of operations at the later jetties near the castle, the other, made from a different angle, appears to be of the same location. One photo of a ship at the later jetties (sometimes referred to as "Lime Jetties" or "Lime Jetty") appears in the standard work, but it gives no hint of cargo, working methods or staff.

The enterprise was uneconomic and suffered a steady decline. Reports to the Crown Commissioners in 1870 and 1874 repeated the opinion that Nicholl had not been successful and the business was unprofitable. An 1874 report concerning land transfer noted that even with the low rate of consumption, the quarry would be exhausted before long. Straightforward enterprise woes were compounded when the Lordship of the Manor was transferred to a Colonel Crossman in 1874; Crossman and Nicholl didn't get on.

The 1871 Census shows only half the number employed compared with 1861, by 1881 this had halved again. Six of Nicholl's ships sailed regularly between Holy Island and Dundee in the 1860s: Agnes, Belford, Isabella, Lancaster, Margaret Reid and Maria. They did not hold a monopoly, other vessels involved in the lime trade included Curlew, Mersey, Robert Hood and Superior. Curlew, William and Mersey all separately suffered an occupational hazard of carrying quicklime at sea – water came into contact with the cargo. The resulting reaction generated enough heat to set the vessels on fire. In the 1870s the number of ships plying the route declined and the work became seasonal. Agnes became the last recorded vessel carrying lime when she sailed for Dundee on 17 September 1883. Nicholl's vessels called in the following years, but none carried lime or coal.

== Operations at quarries, waggonways, kilns and jetties ==
Little hard evidence survives of quarrying and waggonway methods or equipment. The 1861 census lists an "Engine smith" and two blacksmiths. The only mechanical plant recorded at any site is the crane on the Tripping Chare jetty. Hedley's paintings show that ships were moored between the later jetties, which were dissimilar in height. Coal was craned off ships at the lower jetty using ropes attached to ships' mastwork. Lime was tipped into the hold of the ships from the higher jetty. A powder magazine survived until the 1950s, showing that blasting was used as the stone was not to be used for building, but no record of mechanical quarrying equipment has been found.

Hedley's paintings corroborate measurements taken from traces of sleepers that the tracks were approximately 2 feet (610 mm) gauge. The paintings both show horses being used to haul waggons, corroborating a general assumption. There is evidence that a steam engine was tried, but was found wanting as it left the tracks all too readily.

No waggon has survived, once again Hedley gives a good idea that they looked not dissimilar to many unsprung four-wheeled tippler trucks on Victorian industrial lines.

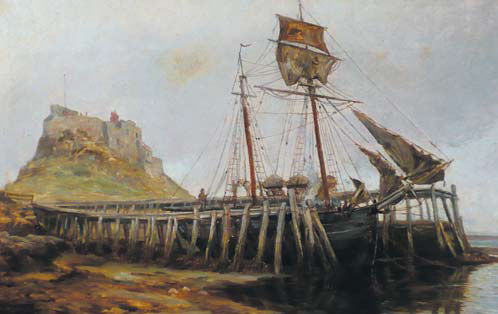
Lindisfarne from the West, showing how lime was tipped into a ship moored between the jetties, Ralph Hedley, 1883

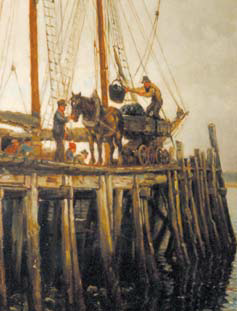
Unloading coal at a wood jetty – Holy Island by Ralph Hedley, 1883

== Afterlife ==
The first two waggonways were lifted and abandoned by about 1861. The only residual use for the infrastructure is the footpath north from Chare Ends. (Note: Satellite imagery and contemporary maps combined by the National Library of Scotland give a good idea of what remained in 2014 on the 1885–1900 1" OS map of Holy Island, via National Library of Scotland. To explore the software to best effect slide the blue circle at bottom left of the screen left to right and use the "2. Select a map..." drop down box to use different maps. The starting position provided shows the route of the waggonway to and on the 1846–61 jetty. Sliding the blue circle leftwards shows an underwater trace of the jetty, but no hint of the trackbed on the farmland north to Chare Ends.) (Note: Map 1 does not have the overlay facility, but by switching between images the user can identify several early structures at St Cuthbert's Limeworks and hints of the route to Snipe Point."Map 1: 1860 6" OS map of Holy Island". National Library of Scotland.) The ruin of at least one of St Cuthbert's pots was clearly identifiable in 2012.

Nessend Quarry and much of the eastern tramway are visible on navigable maps. (Note: Satellite imagery and contemporary maps combined by the National Library of Scotland give a good idea of what remained in 2014 on the Map 3: Edwardian 6" OS map of Holy Island, via National Library of Scotland. To explore the software to best effect slide the blue circle at bottom left of the screen left to right and use the "2. Select a map..." drop down box to use different maps. The starting position provided is Nessend Quarry. Sliding the blue circle leftwards shows a modern satellite view.) From Sandham southwards the third waggonway was on an embankment all the way to the castle, visible on satellite view, map view, on photographs and on the ground. In 2014 it formed the foundation of a well maintained public footpath. The lime kilns at the castle have been preserved and are maintained by the National Trust. The grade-separated trackbeds for bringing coal from the 1861–83 jetties and limestone from Nessend and taking finished product to the jetties can be inferred from the software and from images in the line's standard work, as well as on the ground. (Note: A second resource combining maps, satellite imagery and railway overlays is The 1861–83 Jetties via Rail Map Online. Users can change backgrounds by a drop-down menu at upper right of screen and navigate round the island at will.) In 2016 evidence of the jetties at the castle was still plain to see.

== Sources ==
- Jermy, Roger C. (1992). Lindisfarne's Limestone Past: Quarries, Tramways and Kilns. Morpeth, Northumberland: Northumberland County Library. ISBN 978-1-874020-04-2.
- Jermy, Roger C. (2012). Northern Northumberland's Minor Railways: Volume 4: Limestone Industry Lines. Catrine: The Oakwood Press. ISBN 978-0-85361-706-8. Locomotion Papers 234D.
- Magnusson, Magnus (1984). Lindisfarne: The Cradle Island. Stocksfield: Oriel Press. ISBN 978-0-85362-223-9.
- Census, England and Wales (1861). Holy Island. Vol. RG9/Piece 3884/Folio 48/Page 25 Murray, William aged 36.
- Tomlinson, William Weaver (2011) [1910]. Comprehensive Guide to the County of Northumberland (11th ed.). British Library, Historical Print Editions. ISBN 978-1-241-24400-2.
- Whipple, Tom (6 July 2016). "Crowdfunded dig discovers first signs of lost monastery". The Times. London. No 71955.
