= List of shipwrecks in 1839 =

The list of shipwrecks in 1839 includes ships sunk, foundered, wrecked, grounded, or otherwise lost during 1839.

table of contents
← 1838 / 1839 / 1840 →
Jan	Feb	Mar	Apr
May	Jun	Jul	Aug
Sep	Oct	Nov	Dec
Unknown date

== Unknown date ==
List of shipwrecks: Unknown date in 1839
Ship	State	Description
Achille	France	The ship was lost before 21 July. She was on a voyage from Marseille, Bouches-du-Rhône to Guadeloupe.
Attaran	United Kingdom	The schooner was wrecked near Nampang Island, China. Her crew were rescued but the ship was burnt by the Chinese.
Constance	France	The ship was driven ashore in the Ganges. She was on a voyage from Calcutta, India to a French port. Constance was later refloated and put back to Calcutta.
Elizabeth	United Kingdom	The ship was wrecked off Saugor, India. She was on a voyage from Greenock, Renfrewshire to Calcutta.
Elizabeth	United Kingdom	The ship was wrecked off the Cape of Good Hope. She was on a voyage from Madras, India to London.
Equitable	United Kingdom	The ship was lost in the Ganges with the loss of four lives. She was on a voyage from Bordeaux, Gironde, France to Calcutta.
Fame	United Kingdom	The ship was wrecked at Naples, Kingdom of the Two Sicilies. Her crew were rescued. She was on a voyage from Ancona, Papal States to Liverpool.
Gazelle	United Kingdom	The ship was wrecked at Bahia, Brazil. She was on a voyage from London to Hobart, Van Diemen's Land.
Governor Coddington	Unknown	The brig was lost on Island Beach on the coast of New Jersey.
Herald	United States	The ship was destroyed by fire with the loss of five lives. She was on a voyage from Calcutta to Boston, Massachusetts.
Industry	United Kingdom	The ship sank off Dale, Pembrokeshire. She was refloated in early May.
Jane	United Kingdom	The ship was wrecked whilst on a voyage from "Lumbuck" to China. Her crew were rescued.
Juno	United Kingdom	The whaler was wrecked in the Fiji Islands. All but three of those on board were murdered by the local inhabitants.
Pleiades	(United Kingdom of Great Britain and Ireland) New South Wales	The barque was wrecked on Lombok, Netherlands East Indies.
Sevo	United States	The schooner was run down in the night by steamer Huntress off Thacher Island and sank almost immediately. The Captain climbed aboard the steamer and a 12 year old crewmember was rescued by Huntress. 4 crew died.
Trazas	France	The ship was lost at Sierra Leone. She was on a voyage from Sierra Leone to Bordeaux, Gironde.
