= List of shipwrecks in 1843 =

The list of shipwrecks in 1843 includes ships sunk, foundered, wrecked, grounded, or otherwise lost during 1843.

table of contents
← 1842 / 1843 / 1844 →
Jan	Feb	Mar	Apr
May	Jun	Jul	Aug
Sep	Oct	Nov	Dec
Unknown date

== Unknown date ==
List of shipwrecks: Unknown date in 1843
Ship	State	Description
Akbar	United States	The ship ran aground on a reef off Borneo and was damaged. She was on a voyage from China to New York. She was refloated and completed her voyage.
Algarve	Portuguese Navy	The schooner foundered off the Cape Verde Islands between January and April.
Amédée Constance	France	The ship was destroyed by fire off the Antilles. Her crew were rescued. She was on a voyage from Veracruz, Mexico to Havre de Grâce.
Ann Johnson	United Kingdom	The ship was driven ashore whilst on a voyage from New Orleans, Louisiana, United States to Saint John, New Brunswick, British North America. She was refloated and put into Key West, Florida Territory where she was repaired. She resumed her voyage but was driven ashore and wrecked at "Cape Hueso" before 15 July.
Branch	United States	The schooner was lost in the Bay of St. Lawrence. Crew saved.
Bridget Timmin	United Kingdom	The brig was wrecked near Gibraltar.
Duoro	Portugal	The schooner foundered off the Isles of Scilly, United Kingdom.
Gannet	(United Kingdom of Great Britain and Ireland) New Zealand	The ship was wrecked off the east coast of New Zealand's North Island during the same storm that sank the Governor Hobson (qv) in late August or early September. All hands were saved.
Governor Hobson	(United Kingdom of Great Britain and Ireland) New Zealand	The schooner was wrecked in Poverty Bay, New Zealand during the same storm that sank the Gannet (qv) in late August or early September, with the loss of the crew of seven.
Harriet	United Kingdom	The whaler was burnt and scuttled at "Quallan" or "Strong's Island" (approx 6°N 162°E) and most of her crew were murdered by the local inhabitants.
John	(United Kingdom of Great Britain and Ireland) New South Wales	The cutter was wrecked on a reef 300 nautical miles (560 km) off Tahiti between 9 May and 13 October. Her crew survived.
Margaretha Maria	Hamburg	The ship foundered off Port-au-Prince, Haiti. Her crew were rescued. She was on a voyage from Port-au-Prince to Hamburg.
Plata	France	The ship was wrecked before 10 August. She was on a voyage from Montevideo, Uruguay to Buenos Aires, Argentina and Saint-Malo, Ille-et-Vilaine.
Rachel	United Kingdom	The sloop foundered off Cardigan with the loss of all hands.
Radford	United Kingdom	The ship was abandoned in the North Sea between 26 September and 3 October. Her crew were rescued by Sympathy (United Kingdom). Radford was on a voyage from Newcastle upon Tyne, Northumberland to Kronstadt, Russia.
Rebecca	United Kingdom	The schooner was wrecked in the Dry Tortugas. She was on a voyage from British Honduras to New Orleans, Louisiana, United States.
Susan Crisp	United Kingdom	The ship was driven ashore at the mouth of the Rangoon River.
Thomas Bold	United Kingdom	The ship was wrecked at Huasco, Chile.
Turner	United States	The ship foundered in the Atlantic Ocean in February or March. Her crew were rescued after 46 days on the wreck by Furit (flag unknown). Turner was on a voyage from an American port to Madeira.
NRP Vauga	Portuguese Navy	The brigantine foundered in the Atlantic Ocean between February and April.
William and Robert	United Kingdom	The ship sank off Saint Tudwal's Islands, Pembrokeshire. She was on a voyage from Liverpool, Lancashire to Pwllheli, Caernarvonshire. She was refloated in mid-August and taken into Pwllheli.
