= List of shipwrecks in 1845 =

The list of shipwrecks in 1845 includes ships sunk, foundered, wrecked, grounded, or otherwise lost during 1845.

table of contents
← 1844 / 1845 / 1846 →
Jan	Feb	Mar	Apr
May	Jun	Jul	Aug
Sep	Oct	Nov	Dec
Unknown date

== Unknown date ==
List of shipwrecks: Unknown date in 1845
Ship	State	Description
Auguste	France	The ship was wrecked in the River Plate.
Bonne Marie, or Bonne Sophia	France	The ship was wrecked near Castillos, Uruguay.
Countess of Wilton	United Kingdom	The schooner was wrecked at Papeete, Tahiti.
Dumont	France	The ship was wrecked at Ganjam, India before 6 November. She was on a voyage from Île Bourbon to Calcutta, India.
Fair Arcadian	United Kingdom	The ship was wrecked in the Bay of St. Brieve with the loss of twenty of the 25 people on board. She was on a voyage from Saint John, New Brunswick, British North America to London.
Force	France	The ship was wrecked on the coast of Portugal between 24 October and 27 November. She was on a voyage from Nantes, Loire-Inférieure to Cette, Hérault.
Frankland	United Kingdom	The ship was wrecked at Algiers, Algeria. Her crew were rescued. She was on a voyage from Bahia, Brazil to Liverpool, Lancashire.
Gardner	United Kingdom	The ship ran aground in the Yangtze 15 nautical miles (28 km) downstream of Woosung, China. She was later refloated.
Halifax Packet	United Kingdom	The ship was driven ashore at Fremantle, Swan River Colony. She was on a voyage from the Swan River to London.
Jeune Philomen	France	The ship was wrecked on the coast of Cuba. She was on a voyage from Havre de Grâce, Seine-Inférieure to Matanzas, Cuba.
Monte de Ville	France	The barque was driven ashore on the Indian coast.
Olive Branch	United Kingdom	The ship was wrecked on Sker Point, Glamorgan with the loss of three of her nine crew.
Royal Consort	United Kingdom	The ship was destroyed by fire at Calcutta.
Sir Henry Hardinge	United Kingdom	The ship was wrecked on an uncharted rock off Fårö, Sweden.
Vulcan	(United Kingdom of Great Britain and Ireland) South Australia	The schooner was wrecked on Flinders Island, Van Diemen's Land between 10 April and 23 June.
