= List of shipwrecks in 1846 =

The list of shipwrecks in 1846 includes ships sunk, foundered, wrecked, grounded, or otherwise lost during 1846.

table of contents
← 1845 / 1846 / 1847 →
Jan	Feb	Mar	Apr
May	Jun	Jul	Aug
Sep	Oct	Nov	Dec
Unknown date

== Unknown date ==
List of shipwrecks: Unknown date in 1846
Ship	State	Description
Allison	United Kingdom	Lloyd's Register for 1846 listed the ship as lost.
Bon Pasteur	France	The ship was driven ashore on Martinique.
Caïman	France	The steamship was wrecked on the coast of Africa.
Caroline	Bremen	The ship was lost in the Orinoco. She was on a voyage from New York, United States to Angostura, Venezuela.
George I	France	The ship was destroyed by fire on the coast of Peru.
La Colonne	France	The whaler was wrecked at "Paraki", New Zealand between 12 January and 23 September with the loss of three of her crew.
Lady of the Lake	(United Kingdom of Great Britain and Ireland) New Zealand	The sailing vessel was holed and grounded at Manukau, en route from Wellington to Auckland, in late February or early March.
Mithridate	Flag unknown	The ship was driven ashore at "Guanacoce", Puerto Rico.
Resource	United Kingdom	The ship foundered off the coast of Brazil. Her crew were rescued. She was on a voyage from Montevideo, Uruguay to Liverpool, Lancashire.
Severn	United Kingdom	The ship was wrecked at Aracati, Mexico. Her crew survived.
Stakesby	United Kingdom	The ship foundered without a trace while sailing from London to Quebec.
Susan	United Kingdom	The ship foundered on a voyage from London to the Cape Colony with the loss of all hands.
Terrier	United Kingdom	The ship was wrecked on the Isle of Pines, Cuba.
