= List of shipwrecks in July 1868 =

The list of shipwrecks in July 1868 includes ships sunk, foundered, grounded, or otherwise lost during July 1868.

== 1 July ==
List of shipwrecks: 1 July 1868
Ship	State	Description
Unnamed	United Kingdom	The paddle steamer ran aground off the Dutch coast. Her passengers were taken off by Sliedrecht (Netherlands).

== 2 July ==
List of shipwrecks: 2 July 1868
Ship	State	Description
Conflict	United Kingdom	The ship capsized at Millwall, Middlesex and was severely damaged.
Eugenie	United Kingdom	The ship collided with a pilot boat and ran onto the Old Harry Rocks. She was on a voyage from Salcombe, Devon to Madeira. She was refloated.
Florence	(United Kingdom of Great Britain and Ireland) New Zealand	The schooner was captured by Māori warriors in the Chatham Islands and set adrift unmanned with full rig. She grounded and became a total wreck.

== 3 July ==
List of shipwrecks: 3 July 1868
Ship	State	Description
City of Manchester	United Kingdom	The ship was driven ashore in the Traverne. She was on a voyage from Quebec City, Canada to Liverpool, Lancashire. She had been towed back to Quebec City in a waterlogged condition by 11 July and was placed under repair.
Peter Maxwell	United Kingdom	The ship was driven ashore near Crane Island. She was on a voyage from Quebec City to Liverpool. She was refloated the next day and resumed her voyage.

== 4 July ==
List of shipwrecks: 4 July 1868
Ship	State	Description
Countess of Elgin	United Kingdom	The ship foundered in the Atlantic Ocean. Her crew were rerscued by the barque Vestor (United Kingdom). Countess of Elgin was on a voyage from Hull, Yorkshire to Quebec City, Canada.
Pommer	Prussia	The ship ran aground on the Westra Finngrundet, in the Gulf of Bothnia. She was on a voyage from Långrör, Sweden to Sunderland, County Durham, United Kingdom. She was refloated and resumed her voyage.

== 5 July ==
List of shipwrecks: 5 July 1868
Ship	State	Description
Athelstan	United Kingdom	The barque foundered in the Pacific Ocean (42°00′S 81°30′W) with the loss of three of her crew. She was on a voyage from Liverpool, Lancashire to Coquimbo, Chile.
Mai-Blume	Flag unknown	The ship was destroyed by fire at Bombay, India.

== 6 July ==
List of shipwrecks: 6 July 1868
Ship	State	Description
Mary Boucher	United Kingdom	The brig was wrecked on Five Keys off Castle Island, Bahamas. Her crew were rescued. She was on a voyage from St. Jago de Cuba, Cuba to Trieste.

== 7 July ==
List of shipwrecks: 7 July 1868
Ship	State	Description
Valdivia	Chile	The ship departed from Carrizal Bajo for Constitución. No further trace, presumed foundered with the loss of all hands.

== 8 July ==
List of shipwrecks: 8 July 1868
Ship	State	Description
Therese Tietjens	Flag unknown	The ship was driven ashore near Akyab, Burma.

== 9 July ==
List of shipwrecks: 9 July 1868
Ship	State	Description
Alix	France	The barque was destroyed by fire in the Atlantic Ocean (5°42′N 28°24′W). All on board were rescued by the barque La Prime (France). Alix was on a voyage from Havre de Grâce, Seine-Inférieure to the River Plate.
Esperance	Norway	The barque ran aground at Great Yarmouth, Norfolk, United Kingdom. She was on a voyage from Nicolaieff, Russia to Great Yarmouth. She was refloated the next day and taken in to Great Yarmouth.
Powerful	United Kingdom	The tug collided with the steamship Fruiterer (United Kingdom) at Lowestoft, Suffolk and was severely damaged.
Salween	United Kingdom	The barque ran aground on a reef off Olinda, Brazil and was severely damaged. She was on a voyage from Sydney, New South Wales to London. She was refloated and taken in to Pernambuco, Brazil, where she was condemned.
USS Suwanee	United States Navy	The gunboat was wrecked in Shadwell Passage in Queen Charlotte Sound off the coast of the Colony of British Columbia.

== 10 July ==
List of shipwrecks: 10 July 1868
Ship	State	Description
Formby	United Kingdom	The ship was sighted in the Indian Ocean whilst on a voyage from Bassein, India to Liverpool, Lancashire. No further trace, presumed foundered with the loss of all hands.
Jubilee	United Kingdom	The steamship ran aground at Barber's Point, in the Dardanelles. She was on a voyage from Cardiff, Glamorgan to Constantinople, Ottoman Empire. She was refloated.
Wildfire	United Kingdom	The whaler was destroyed by fire in Cumberland Sound. Her crew were rescued.

== 11 July ==
List of shipwrecks: 11 July 1868
Ship	State	Description
Hylton Maid	United Kingdom	The brig ran aground on Scharhörn, Hamburg and was wrecked. Her crew survived. She was on a voyage from Seaham, County Durham to Hamburg. The wreck was refloated on 18 July and towed in to Cuxhaven.

== 14 July ==
List of shipwrecks: 14 July 1868
Ship	State	Description
Ann	United Kingdom	The ship sprang a leak and foundered 4 nautical miles (7.4 km) north east of Flamborough Head, Yorkshire. Her crew were rescued.
Elizabeth	United Kingdom	The ship was beached at Maldonado, Uruguay. She was on a voyage from Buenos Aires, Argentina to an English port. She was later refloated.
William Booking	United Kingdom	The ship ran aground on the Maplin Sand, in the North Sea off the coast of Essex, and sank.

== 15 July ==
List of shipwrecks: 15 July 1868
Ship	State	Description
Kunderund Treevan	India	The ship was wrecked in the Maldive Islands. Her crew were rescued.
Pat The Rover	(United Kingdom of Great Britain and Ireland) New Zealand	The 79-ton brig broke up after becoming stranded at the entrance to the Grey River during a storm. All hands were saved.
Torrent	United States	The 576-ton wooden bark struck a reef and foundered in a storm and went ashore in English Bay on the coast of the Department of Alaska. All on board survived.
Thora	Rostock	The ship was lost off Holmöarna, Sweden. Her crew were rescued. She was on a voyage from Strömstad, Sweden to Plymouth, Devon, United Kingdom.

== 16 July ==
List of shipwrecks: 16 July 1868
Ship	State	Description
Glide	United Kingdom	The barque was driven ashore at Placentia, Newfoundland Colony. She was on a voyage from Dalhousie, New Brunswick, Canada to Stockton-on-Tees, County Durham.
Ostsee	Flag unknown	The ship was driven ashore at Pachino, Sicily, Italy. She was on a voyage from Constantinople, Ottoman Empire to an English port.

== 17 July ==
List of shipwrecks: 17 July 1868
Ship	State	Description
Neptune	Rostock	The brig was run into by the steamship Danube (United Kingdom) and sank 5 nautical miles (9.3 km) north west of Tarifa, Spain. Her crew were rescued.
Peninsular	United Kingdom	The steamship ran aground in the River Thames at Blackwall, Middlesex. She was on a voyage from Gibraltar to London. She was refloated.

== 18 July ==
List of shipwrecks: 18 July 1868
Ship	State	Description
Ariro	Spain	The ship was driven onto the Pearl Rock. She was refloated and towed in to Gibraltar Bay in a severely leaky condition.
Germania	Flag unknown	The ship ran aground at Bassein, India and was consequently beached at "Henghei". She was on a voyage from Bassein to a European port.
India	United States	The ship was driven ashore on Martín García Island, Argentina. She was on a voyage from Fray Bentos, Uruguay to Queenstown, County Cork, United Kingdom. She was refloated and resumed her voyage, but put in to Pernambuco, Brazil on 21 August in a leaky condition.
My Choice	United Kingdom	The schooner ran aground and sank in the River Swilly. She was on a voyage from Maryport, Cumberland to Letterkenny, County Donegal.
Unnamed	France	The barque ran aground on the Poul Rock.

== 19 July ==
List of shipwrecks: 19 July 1868
Ship	State	Description
Coniston	United Kingdom	The steamship departed from Liverpool for Lancaster, Lancashire. Presumed foundered with the loss of all hands. Burnt wreckage from the ship washed up at Southport, Lancashire on 23 July. The bodies of two crew members subsequently washed ashore.
Maria Pauline	France	The schooner was run into by the steamship Bradford (United Kingdom) and sank off the Dutch coast (52°23′N 2°30′E). All on board were rescued by Bradford. Maria Pauline was on a voyage from Havre de Grâce, Seine-Inférieure to Gothenburg, Sweden.
Southampton	United States	The ship ran aground in the River Avon. She was on a voyage from Havana, Cuba to Bristol, Gloucestershire, United Kingdom. She was refloated and found to be leaky.

== 21 July ==
List of shipwrecks: 21 July 1868
Ship	State	Description
Euphemia	United Kingdom	The ship ran aground in the River Avon. She was on a voyage from Matanzas, Cuba to Bristol, Gloucestershire. She was refloated and found to be leaky.
Maha Lukshmi	United Kingdom	The ship caught fire in the Indian Ocean. She was abandoned on 23 July. Her crew were rescued by Catherine Rankin, Chinaman and Hyppolita (all United Kingdom). Maha Lukshmi was on a voyage from Bombay, India to Liverpool, Lancashire.
Queenstone	United Kingdom	The brig ran aground at Menawethan, Isles of Scilly. She was on a voyage from Cardiff, Glamorgan to a Mediterranean port. She was refloated and resumed her voyage.
Victory	United Kingdom	The ship ran aground in the River Avon. She was on a voyage from Africa to Bristol. She was refloated and found to be leaky.
Wild Wave	United Kingdom	The schooner ran aground on the Leigh Middle Sand, in the Thames Estuary.
Unnamed	China	The junk foundered off Shanghai. Five crew were rescued by City of Aberdeen (United Kingdom).

== 22 July ==
List of shipwrecks: 22 July 1868
Ship	State	Description
HMS Eclipse	Royal Navy	The Eclipse-class sloop was driven ashore. Subsequently refloated, repaired and returned to service.

== 23 July ==
List of shipwrecks: 23 July 1868
Ship	State	Description
Anniversary	United Kingdom	The ship ran aground off Gotland, Sweden. She was on a voyage from Kronstadt, Russia to London. She was refloated and resumed her voyage, but put in to Helsingør, Denmark in a leaky condition.
Castilian	Spain	The ship ran aground at Camden Point, County Cork, United Kingdom. She was on a voyage from Sagua La Grande, Cuba to Queenstown, County Cork.
Daniel Watson	(United Kingdom of Great Britain and Ireland) Tasmania	The brig was wrecked on a reef in Lyttelton Harbour, New Zealand. The crew were rescued by the steamer Gazelle.
Julia	United Kingdom	The brig was destroyed by fire off St. Ives, Cornwall. Her crew survived.
Lotus	United Kingdom	The brig was wrecked on a reef off West Caicos, Caicos Islands. Her crew were rescued. She was on a voyage from New York, United States to Truxillo, Mexico.
Margaret Cunnigham	United Kingdom	The schooner ran aground off Kettleness, Yorkshire. Both crew were rescued by the Scarborough Lifeboat Sheffield ( Royal National Lifeboat Institution). She subsequently drove ashore at Runswick Bay and was wrecked.

== 24 July ==
List of shipwrecks: 24 July 1868
Ship	State	Description
Star	(United Kingdom of Great Britain and Ireland) Jersey	The cutter ran aground off Whitstable, Kent. Her crew were rescued. She sank the next day. She was on a voyage from London to Barfleur, Manche, France.

== 25 July ==
List of shipwrecks: 25 July 1868
Ship	State	Description
Flying Childers, and Hibernia	United Kingdom	The paddle tug Flying Childers ran aground in the Clyde at Kilpatrick, Dunbartonshire and was run into by the steamship Hibernia, which she was towing, and was severely damaged. Her crew were rescued. She was refloated the next day. Hibernia also ran aground. She was on a voyage from New York, United States to Glasgow, Renfrewshire. she was refloated and put in to Bowling, Dunbartonshire.
Julia	United Kingdom	The brig exploded and sank off St. Ives, Cornwall. Her crew were rescued. She was on a voyage from Llanelly, Glamorgan to Dieppe, Seine-Inférieure, France.
Star	Denmark	The ship was driven ashore at Hooghly Point, India. She was on a voyage from Calcutta, India to London, United Kingdom. She was refloated on 30 July.
Swan	United Kingdom	The ship was wrecked in the Pentland Firth. Her crew were rescued. She was on a voyage from Peterhead, Aberdeenshire to Easdale, Argyllshire.

== 26 July ==
List of shipwrecks: 26 July 1868
Ship	State	Description
Hollandstrouw	Netherlands	The ship caught fire off Réunion and was abandoned with the loss of ten lives. Survivors were rescued by India (United Kingdom). Hollandstrouw was on a voyage from South Shields, County Durham, United Kingdom to Batavia, Netherlands East Indies.

== 27 July ==
List of shipwrecks: 27 July 1868
Ship	State	Description
HMS Basilisk	Royal Navy	The sloop of war was driven ashore on the coast of China. Subsequently refloated, repaired and returned to service.
Constantia	United Kingdom	The barque was wrecked at East London, Cape Colony. Her crew were rescued.
George Sarale	United Kingdom	The ship ran aground at Ballyness, County Donegal. She was on a voyage from Letterkenny, County Donegal to Liverpool, Lancashire.
Sea Rover	United Kingdom	The barque was wrecked at East London. Her crew were rescued.
Shantung	United Kingdom	The barque was wrecked at East London. Her crew were rescued.

== 28 July ==
List of shipwrecks: 28 July 1868
Ship	State	Description
Eliza Goddard	United Kingdom	The ship was abandoned in the Irish Sea off the Baily Lighthouse, County Dublin. Her crew were rescued by the steamship Duke of Sutherland (United Kingdom). Eliza Goddard was on a voyage from Bangor, Caernarfonshire to Dublin.

== 29 July ==
List of shipwrecks: 29 July 1868
Ship	State	Description
Hope	United Kingdom	The schooner struck rocks off the Île de Sein, Finistère, France. Her crew were rescued by a French vessel. She was on a voyage from Liverpool, Lancashire to Santander, Spain.

== 30 July ==
List of shipwrecks: 30 July 1868
Ship	State	Description
Rover's Bride	United Kingdom	The schooner ran aground off the Lapen. She was refloated and resumed her voyage.

== 31 July ==
List of shipwrecks: 31 July 1868
Ship	State	Description
HMS Beacon	Royal Navy	The Beacon-class gunvessel ran aground in the Uruguay River. She was refloated.
Columbia	United Kingdom	The whaler was crushed between two ice floes and sank in Cumberland Sound. Her 21 crew were rescued by Lord Saltoun (United Kingdom).
Curlew	United Kingdom	Carrying a cargo of lime she had taken on at the jetties of the Nessend Quarry to Castle Point tramway on Lindisfarne, the vessel was in the North Sea off the May Light on the coast of England when water came into contact with the cargo and the heat generated set fire to her. She sank, but her two-man crew was saved.

== Unknown date ==
List of shipwrecks: Unknown date in July 1868
Ship	State	Description
Anna	United Kingdom	The brig ran aground at Wilmington, North Carolina, United States. She was refloated on 9 July and found to be severely leaky.
Anna Catherine	United Kingdom	The barque was wrecked at Valparaíso, Chile.
Anna Metta	Bremen	The ship was wrecked. She was on a voyage from Bremen to Saint Petersburg, Russia.
Annie Laurie	United Kingdom	The barque was wrecked at Valparaíso.
Britannia	United Kingdom	The ship was lost before 16 July.
City of Boston	United States	The steamship collided with the steamship State of New York (United States) off the mouth of the Connecticut River and was severely damaged. Three passengers died.
Crapaud	(United Kingdom of Great Britain and Ireland) Jersey	The ship foundered in the English Channel off the coast of Seine-Inférieure, France on or before 20 July.
Danube	United Kingdom	The ship ran aground in the Dardanelles. She was on a voyage from London to Odesa, Russia. She was refloated and resumed her voyage.
Dunkeld	United Kingdom	The ship was wrecked on the coast of Labrador, Newfoundland Colony. She was on a voyage from Montreal, Quebec, Canada to Queenstown, County Cork.
Ella and Annie	United Kingdom	The ship ran aground in the River Plate.
Fiery Cross	India	The ship foundered in the Bay of Bengal. She was on a voyage from Calcutta to Muscat, Sultanate of Muscat and Oman.
Irene	United Kingdom	The steamship ran aground off Barbuda. She was on a voyage from Baltimore, Maryland, United States to Demerara, British Guiana. She was refloated, putting in to Antigua on 15 July for repairs.
Mary Kay	United Kingdom	The ship foundered in the Atlantic Ocean. Her crew were rescued by Clotilde (France).
Minden	United Kingdom	The ship was destroyed by fire. Her crew were rescued. She was on a voyage from Garrucha, Spain to the River Tyne.
Nueva Angelita	Chile	The barque foundered in the Pacific Ocean. Her crew were rescued. She was on a voyage from Pisagua, Chile to a European port.
Oryx	United Kingdom	The ship ran aground near Osaka, Japan. she was refloated.
Peru	Italy	The ship was wrecked in the Falkland Islands.
Pride of the West	United Kingdom	The ship ran aground in the Dardanelles. She was on a voyage from London to Constantinople, Ottoman Empire. She was refloated.
Reindeer	United Kingdom	The ship foundered off the Maldive Islands before 15 July. Her crew were rescued.
Russell	United Kingdom	The barque ran aground off the Tunara Battery, Spain. She was refloated and resumed her voyage.
Timor Shah	United Kingdom	The ship ran aground in the Hooghly River before 16 July.
Trevanion	United Kingdom	The ship foundered off the Maldive Islands before 15 July. Her crew were rescued.
Vaaren	Flag unknown	The ship was driven ashore. She was on a voyage from Brăila, Ottoman Empire to a British port. She was refloated and put in to Constantinople, where she arrived on 27 July.
