= List of shipwrecks in 1842 =

The list of shipwrecks in 1842 includes ships sunk, foundered, wrecked, grounded, or otherwise lost during 1842.

table of contents
← 1841 / 1842 / 1843 →
Jan	Feb	Mar	Apr
May	Jun	Jul	Aug
Sep	Oct	Nov	Dec
Unknown date

== Unknown date ==
List of shipwrecks: Unknown date in 1842
Ship	State	Description
Actæon	United Kingdom	The ship was wrecked in the Turks Island before 7 March.
Adolphe	France	The ship was lost in St. Lunaire Bay. Her crew were rescued.
Aguina	United Kingdom	The ship capsized in the North Sea off Scarborough, Yorkshire in late March or early April with the loss of all hands.
Allalevie	India	The ship was wrecked in Vanloos Bay, Ceylon. She was on a voyage from Calcutta to Ceylon.
Bayonnais	United Kingdom	The ship ran aground at "Tobasco" and was consequently condemned. She was on a voyage from "Tobasco" to Havre de Grâce, Seine-Inférieure.
Bellous	United States	The full-rigged ship sank in the Grand Banks of Newfoundland in the Autumn. She was refloated in 1843, repaired and returned to service.
Belvidera	India	The ship was destroyed at Singapore before 1 November.
Cadmus	United States	The whaler was wrecked on St. John the Baptist's Island, in the Pitcairn Islands.
Casinir	France	The ship was wrecked at Ciudad del Carmen, Mexico. Her crew were rescued.
Clyde	United Kingdom	The ship was wrecked on the north coast of Barbados before 9 March. Her crew were rescued by HMS Firefly, HMS Spitfire and HMS Tartarus (all Royal Navy).
Debon	France	The ship was lost in St. Lunaire Bay. Her crew were rescued.
Emma	United Kingdom	The ship was wrecked at Kedgeree, India.
Euphrates	France	The ship was wrecked whilst on a voyage from New Orleans, Louisiana to Cette, Hérault. Her crew were rescued by Rio Grande (United States).
Felicie	France	The ship was lost in St. Lunaire Bay. Her crew were rescued.
Fluminee	Empire of Brazil	The brig was wrecked. Three crew were rescued by Regent ( United Kingdom).
General Evans	United Kingdom	The ship was wrecked off the Rio Grande. All on board were rescued. She was on a voyage from London to Sierra Leone.
Herculaneum	United Kingdom	The transport ship was lost in the South China Sea.
Lady Stafford	United Kingdom	The brig capsized at Newfoundland before 4 June.
Martha	(United Kingdom of Great Britain and Ireland) Jersey	The ship was wrecked at "Bona Vista". Her fourteen crew were rescued by Elizabeth and Jane (United Kingdom.
North America	United States	The ship was driven ashore and wrecked at Key West, Florida Territory.
President	United Kingdom	The ship was abandoned in the Atlantic Ocean before 9 April. Her crew were rescued by Cameo (United States). President was on a voyage from Halifax, Nova Scotia, British North America to Barbados.
Robert	United Kingdom	The ship was abandoned in the Gulf of Mexico. Her crew were rescued. She was on a voyage from Savanilla, near Puerto Colombia, to Liverpool, Lancashire.
Singular	Spain	The brig was lost in the South China Sea. She was on a voyage from Manila, Spanish East Indies to Macao.
Sir Andrew Hammond	United Kingdom	The whaler was wrecked on the coast of Peru before 2 April.
Speculator	(United Kingdom of Great Britain and Ireland) New Zealand	The ship was lost en route between Mercury Bay (which she left on 12 August) and Wellington.
Strathfieldsaye	United Kingdom	The ship was wrecked at Kedgeree. She was on a voyage from Madras, India to Enmore, New South Wales and China.
Two Sisters	United Kingdom	The barque struck a rock and foundered off Wednesday Island, New South Wales. All on board were rescued by Malcolm ( United Kingdom), Arab, John Brewer and Kelso (all United Kingdom).
Union	France	The ship was lost in St. Lunaire Bay. Her crew were rescued.
Uxor	Flag unknown	The schooner was wrecked. Eight crew were rescued by Regent ( United Kingdom).
