= List of shipwrecks in 1840 =

foundered, wrecked, grounded, or otherwise lost during 1840.

table of contents
← 1839 / 1840 / 1841 →
Jan	Feb	Mar	Apr
May	Jun	Jul	Aug
Sep	Oct	Nov	Dec
Unknown date

== Unknown date ==
List of shipwrecks: Unknown date 1840
Ship	State	Description
Alert	United States	The steamboat sank in the Missouri River in Alert Bend, above Fisher's Landing near Hermann, Missouri.
Clio	France	The ship was lost in the Maldive Islands.
Egyptian	United Kingdom	The ship was wrecked on the Pratas Shoal. She was on a voyage from Liverpool, Lancashire to Sydney.
Falcon	United Kingdom	The ship was wrecked off Anegada, Virgin Islands. Her crew were rescued. She was on a voyage from London to Saint Domingo.
Guillardon	(United Kingdom of Great Britain and Ireland) New South Wales	The ship was wrecked at the mouth of the Hooghly River with the loss of a pilot. Her crew were rescued. She was on a voyage from Sydney to Calcutta, India.
Hermosa	United States	The schooner – a slave ship – ran aground in the Abaco Islands during a voyage from Richmond, Virginia, to New Orleans, Louisiana. She was refloated and sailed to Nassau in the Bahamas, where local authorities seized and removed her cargo of slaves.
Jenny	United Kingdom	The sloop foundered in the Irish Sea. She was on a voyage from Milford Haven, Pembrokeshire to Cardigan.
Jeune Lise	France	The ship ran aground on reefs off Guadeloupe. She was on a voyage from Guadeloupe to Bordeaux, Gironde. Jeune Lise was refloated and taken into Guadeloupe.
John Barry	(United Kingdom of Great Britain and Ireland) New South Wales	The ship was reported to have been wrecked in the Lombok Strait, but had merely run aground. She was refloated and taken to Surabaya, Netherlands East Indies for repairs.
John C. Jackson	Unknown	The schooner was lost in the vicinity of "Squan Inlet." The terms "Squan" and "Squan Beach" were used at the time for the coast of New Jersey near Manasquan and sometimes for the 7-mile (11 km) stretch of coast between Manasquan Inlet and Cranberry Inlet or for the entire coast of New Jersey between Sea Girt and Barnegat Inlet. "Squan Inlet" could refer to Manasquan Inlet or another inlet along the coast of New Jersey.
Lonach	United Kingdom	The barque was wrecked in the Nicobar Islands before 29 June. She was on a voyage from Calcutta to Port Adelaide, South Australia.
Mary	United Kingdom	The ship was wrecked on the east coast of what is now the Dominican Republic. She was on a voyage from Saint Croix, Virgin Islands to London.
Matilda	United Kingdom	The ship was wrecked in the Cayman Islands.
Potomac	Unknown	The schooner was lost on Island Beach on the coast of New Jersey.
Randolph	United States	The steamboat was destroyed by fire on the Mississippi River.
Senate	Unknown	The schooner was lost on Manasquan Beach near Manasquan, New Jersey.
Staulkner	United Kingdom	The brig was wrecked on the coast of Newfoundland, British North America.
Vermoil	United States	The steamboat sank in the Mississippi River at St. Louis, Missouri.
Vlarhandel	Netherlands	The ship was driven ashore in the Netherlands East Indies. She was on a voyage from Tjilatjap to Rotterdam, South Holland. Vlarhandel was refloated and put back to Tjilatjap.
