= List of shipwrecks in 1841 =

The list of shipwrecks in 1841 includes ships sunk, foundered, wrecked, grounded, or otherwise lost during 1841.

table of contents
← 1840 / 1841 / 1842 →
Jan	Feb	Mar	Apr
May	Jun	Jul	Aug
Sep	Oct	Nov	Dec
Unknown date

== Unknown date ==
List of shipwrecks: Unknown date in 1841
Ship	State	Description
Albion	United States	The ship was driven ashore on the coast of India before 9 September. She was on a voyage from Calcutta to New York.Albion was refloated and put back to Calcutta. She was consequently condemned.
Athalie	France	The ship was wrecked at Guadeloupe. She was on a voyage from Guadeloupe to Havre de Grâce.
Britannia	United Kingdom	The ship was wrecked in the Hooghly River. She was on a voyage from Calcutta to Mauritius.
Brunswick	United Kingdom	Lloyd's Register for 1841 lists the ship as "wrecked."
Detroit	United States	The derelict brig was purchased at Buffalo, New York in September by businessmen intending to put on a spectacle for people to watch by cutting her adrift in the Niagara River above Niagara Falls with the intention of the ship going over the Falls. When cast adrift on an unknown date she drifted aground on a shoal, eventually breaking up.
Ellen	United Kingdom	The schooner was wrecked on Portland Island, New Zealand. Her crew were rescued.
Gazelle	United Kingdom	The ship was lost at Castillas de Santa Theresa. Her crew were rescued. She was on a voyage from Lisbon, Portugal to Montevideo, Uruguay.
Henry	United Kingdom	The ship ran aground off Fremantle, Western Australia, in 1841, and in late 1841 disappeared after leaving Moulmein, Burma.
Isabella	(United Kingdom of Great Britain and Ireland) New South Wales	The ship was wrecked in the Caroline Islands. Her crew were rescued. She was on a voyage from Sydney to Manila, Spanish East Indies.
"Jack Downing"	United States	The boat was lost at Annisquam, Massachusetts. Crew saved.
Mary	(United Kingdom of Great Britain and Ireland) New South Wales	The whaling barque was last sighted at sea on 30 November 1840 in a typhoon. In November 1842 Mary's wreck was found on Lachlan Island, Van Diemen's Land. Captain and several crew had died there, and others were reported to have made a boat and eventually departed around April 1842.
Pekoe	United Kingdom	The barque sailed from Calcutta, India for London; she went ashore, put back and was condemned.
Perfect	United Kingdom	The ship was run ashore and abandoned at Kedgeree, India.
Robulla	(United Kingdom of Great Britain and Ireland) New South Wales	The sloop was wrecked.
Sir John Harvey	United Kingdom	The ship was wrecked on a reef off Socotra. She was on a voyage from Newcastle upon Tyne, Northumberland to Aden.
Sophia Pate	(United Kingdom of Great Britain and Ireland) New South Wales	The brig was wrecked at Kiapara, New Zealand before 2 October with the loss of 21 of her 32 crew. She was on a voyage from Auckland to the Bay of Islands and Kiapara.
Télémaque	France	The ship was in collision with Jeune Pauline (France) and foundered in the Atlantic Ocean.
Uncertain	United Kingdom	The ship sank in Broad Bay, Isle of Lewis. She was on a voyage from Sunderland, County Durham to Londonderry. Uncertain was refloated in 1843 and taken in to Stornoway, where she was repaired.
Vigaro	(United Kingdom of Great Britain and Ireland) Jamaica	The drogher was wrecked at Jamaica.
