= Crown commissioner =

Crown commissioner (Manx: Barrantagh y Chrooin) was a proposed new title to replace the title of lieutenant governor of the Isle of Man.

On 19 October 2005, the Isle of Man's parliament, Tynwald, approved a proposal to change the lieutenant governor's title to barrantagh y chrooin to reflect the new role which the governor plays in the government of the Isle of Man. The proposed change was then submitted to the Lord of Mann Elizabeth II for royal assent.

In April 2006, however, after much public disapproval, Tynwald rejected the previously approved proposal and withdrew their request for royal assent.
