= List of shipwrecks in 1838 =

This list of shipwrecks in 1838 includes ships sunk, foundered, wrecked, grounded, or otherwise lost during 1838.

table of contents
1838
Jan	Feb	Mar	Apr
May	Jun	Jul	Aug
Sep	Oct	Nov	Dec
Unknown date

== Unknown date ==
List of shipwrecks: Unknown date in 1838
Ship	State	Description
Abeona	(United Kingdom of Great Britain and Ireland) British North America	The ship sank at Saint Domingo.
Abeille	France	The barque was driven ashore in Diamond Creek whilst bound for Île Bourbon. She was later refloated.
African	United Kingdom	The ship struck a sunken rock off Trincomalee, Ceylon and foundered. All on board were rescued.
Ageneria	Flag unknown	The schooner was lost at Mantoloking, New Jersey.
Anna Maria	United Kingdom	The brig was abandoned in the Atlantic Ocean. She was discovered on 26 January 1839 by Elizabeth (United Kingdom). Five putrid bodies were discovered on board.
Belhaven	United Kingdom	The ship was abandoned off Cape Finisterre, Spain. Her crew were rescued. She was on a voyage from Liverpool, Lancashire, to Marseille, Bouches-du-Rhône, France.
Betsey	(United Kingdom of Great Britain and Ireland) Jersey	The ship was presumed to have foundered in the Atlantic Ocean whilst on a voyage from Newfoundland, British North America, to Jersey with the loss of 60 lives.
Yekaterina (Екатерина, 'Catherine')	Imperial Russian Navy	The brig was wrecked at the southern end of Simushir, Kuril Islands, with the loss of all on board. She had departed on 30 September from Okhotsk to Tigil.
Chandler	Flag unknown	The cruiser was lost at Kerch, Russia.
Elizabeth and Maria	(United Kingdom of Great Britain and Ireland) British North America	The ship foundered whilst on a voyage from Bridgeport, Connecticut, United States, to Newfoundland. Her crew were rescued.
Four Brothers	United Kingdom	The sealer was lost at Newfoundland.
Five Sisters	United Kingdom	The sloop was wrecked on the coast of Morayshire.
Frederika Maria	Denmark	The ship was sunk by ice whilst on a voyage from "Troense" to Greenland. Her crew were rescued.
Ganges	United Kingdom	The ship ran aground in the Mississippi River and was severely damaged. She was on a voyage from New Orleans, Louisiana, United States, to Havre de Grâce, Seine-Inférieure, France.
Happy Return	(United Kingdom of Great Britain and Ireland) Guernsey	The ship capsized in the Atlantic Ocean. Her crew were rescued by Flora (United Kingdom). Happy Return was on a voyage from Guernsey to the Azores.
Helmes	(United Kingdom of Great Britain and Ireland) Guernsey	The ship was wrecked on the Florida Reef. She was on a voyage from Havana, Cuba, to Guernsey.
Henry Clay	Unknown	The schooner was lost at Mantoloking, New Jersey.
John Duggen	United Kingdom	The ship departed from Newcastle upon Tyne, Northumberland, for Gibraltar some months before February 1839. No further trace, presumed foundered with the loss of all hands.
Lady Wellington	(United Kingdom of Great Britain and Ireland) New South Wales	The brig was wrecked at Adelaide, South Australia. She was subsequently used as a stores ship.
Laurel	United Kingdom	The ship was driven ashore at New Calabar.
Lord Nelson	(United Kingdom of Great Britain and Ireland) New South Wales	The whaling brig was wrecked on Macquarie Island. Surviving members of her crew were marooned on the island for two years.
Maid of the Mill	United States	The schooner was lost off the coast of Maine. Crew saved.
Mandarin	United States	The ship was wrecked near Batavia, Netherlands East Indies. She was on a voyage from Canton, China, to New York.
Martha	United States	The schooner, a new vessel, coming around from Essex, was capsized off Brace's Cove in a violent squall. The Owner and 2 crew killed.
Milo	United Kingdom	The ship was wrecked on the Hogsty Reef. She was on a voyage from St. Jago de Cuba, Cuba, to Swansea, Glamorgan.
Monticello	United States	The fishing schooner was lost fishing. Crew saved.
Neptune	United Kingdom	The ship was wrecked at the mouth of the River Plate. She was on a voyage from Barcelona, Spain, to Buenos Aires, Argentina.
St. Clair	United Kingdom	The schooner struck rocks and sank in Saldanha Bay.
Telegraph	United Kingdom	The ship was wrecked on Great Heneaga. Her crew were rescued She was on a voyage from Wilmington, Delaware, United States, to Jamaica.
Tinley	United Kingdom	The ship was lost at British Honduras.
Trial	United Kingdom	The ship was sunk by ice off the coast of Newfoundland.
William Salthouse	United Kingdom	The ship ran aground on the Anegada Reef. She was on a voyage from Trinidad to London. She was refloated and put into St. Thomas, Virgin Islands.
