= St. Lunaire Bay =

Natural bay in Newfoundland and Labrador, Canada

Coordinates: 51.500°N 55.497°W

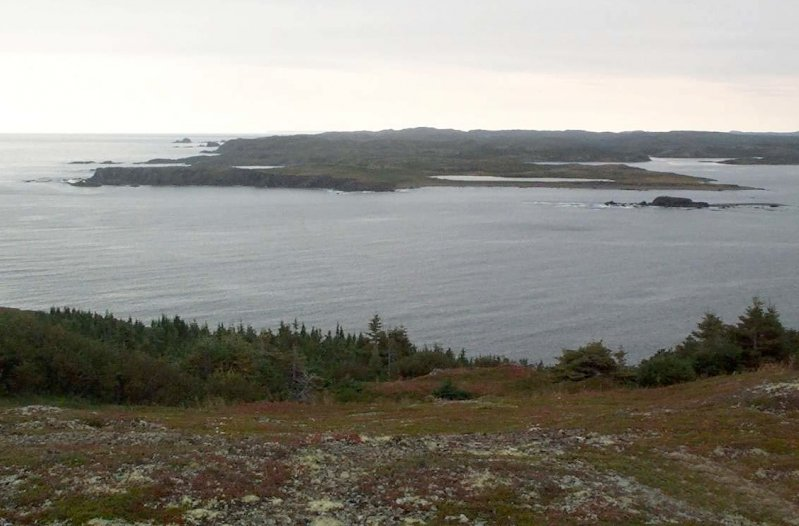
Granchain Island as seen from St Lunaire

St. Lunaire Bay is a natural bay off the island of Newfoundland in the province of Newfoundland and Labrador, Canada.
