= List of shipwrecks in 1868 =

The list of shipwrecks in 1868 includes ships sunk, foundered, grounded, or otherwise lost during 1868.

table of contents
1868
Jan	Feb	Mar	Apr
May	Jun	Jul	Aug
Sep	Oct	Nov	Dec
Unknown date

== Unknown date ==
List of shipwrecks: Unknown date 1868
Ship	State	Description
Ajax	United Kingdom	The steamship sank at Shanghai, China.
Aline	France	The steamship was severely damaged at King's Lynn, Norfolk, United Kingdom between 23 August and 19 September. She departed on the latter date for London, United Kingdom for repairs.
Amaranth	United States	The steamboat sank in the Missouri River at Smith's Bar in Kansas.
Confidence	Prussia	The brig foundered. Her crew were rescued by the smack Columbine (United Kingdom).
Cumberland	United Kingdom	The whaler was lost off the coast of Greenland.
Echunga	United Kingdom	The ship was wrecked at Napier, New Zealand.
Emeline	United States	The whaling schooner was lost in the Arctic.
Fairy Queen	United Kingdom	The schooner ran aground in the River Deben and was scuttled. She was raised in 1872, repaired and returned to service.
Fiery Cross	(United Kingdom of Great Britain and Ireland) India	The clipper foundered in the Bay of Bengal in April or May. She was on a voyage from Calcutta to Muscat, Sultanate of Muscat and Oman.
Galileo	Italy	The extreme clipper was destroyed by fire at sea.
Graf von Schliffen	Rostock	The barque was driven ashore and wrecked on Iona, Inner Hebrides, United Kingdom.
Granite State	United States	The clipper was wrecked.
Growler	United Kingdom	The schooner was wrecked on Vancouver Island, Colony of British Columbia before 11 July. Her crew were rescued. She was on a voyage from Victoria, British Columbia to Sitka, Department of Alaska.
Isablella	United Kingdom	The ship, which had departed from Rangoon, Burma for Queenstown, County Cork on 15 April, was sighted in the Atlantic Ocean on either 25 July or 15 August. No further trace, presumed foundered with the loss of all hands.
Murden	United Kingdom	The brig was destroyed by fire 60 nautical miles (110 km) off the Berlengas, Portugal. Her crew survived.
Schalun	Imperial Russian Navy	The gunboat was driven ashore and wrecked at Kronstadt with the loss of seven of her crew.
Vervisseling	Flag unknown	The ship was lost whilst on a voyage from Veracruz to Sagua La Grande, Mexico.
Vyecha	Imperial Russian Navy	The schooner was driven ashore and wrecked. Her crew were rescued.
W. A. Fisher	United Kingdom	The ship was wrecked. She was on a voyage from San Francisco, California, United States to Auckland, New Zealand.
Wildfire	United Kingdom	The whaler was lost off the coast of Greenland.
