= SS Huntress =

SS Huntress was a steamship which operated in Maine between 1838 and 1916. Built in New York in 1838, the Huntress's registered length, breadth and depth were 172 feet by 23 feet by 9 feet, 6 inches. She weighed 333 tons. It arrived in Bath, Maine, on June 11, 1838, commanded by Captain Kimball. It was owned by the New London & Norwich Steamboat Company.

The vessel resumed the Gardiner-to-Boston (via Portland) route formerly run by the SS New England, which was lost in a collision near Boon Island, Maine, in 1838. In 1840, due to increased business, a larger steamer, the John W. Richmond, was purchased to run the route.

Its initial schedule was to depart Gardiner at 3:00 PM every Monday and Thursday, then departing Bath at 5:00 PM. She would depart from Boston at 7:00 PM on Tuesdays and Fridays. It was berthed in Gardiner until Sunday. She later made three trips a week to Portland.

On July 4, 1838, while being chartered by Cornelius Vanderbilt's steamship company, it was reported that the Huntress carried around 700 passengers from Gardiner to Portland and back.

By 1848, the Huntress was running trips from Hallowell, Maine, to Portland, with the SS Charter Oak and SS Kennebec running alternately to Boston.

Huntress Street, in Portland's Libbytown neighborhood, is named for the vessel.
