= List of shipwrecks in 1844 =

The list of shipwrecks in 1844 includes ships sunk, foundered, wrecked, grounded, or otherwise lost during 1844.

table of contents
1844
Jan	Feb	Mar	Apr
May	Jun	Jul	Aug
Sep	Oct	Nov	Dec
Unknown date

== Unknown date ==
List of shipwrecks: March 1844
Ship	State	Description
Abigail and Eliza	United States	The cargo schooner was lost at St. Thomas, Danish West Indies. Crew saved.
Amelia	(United Kingdom of Great Britain and Ireland) New South Wales	The ship was wrecked whilst bound for an English port.
Amity	United States	The ship was wrecked on the Northern Triangles.
Ashanteo	Flag unknown	The ship capsized in a squall off the coast of Africa. She was subsequently driven ashore and wrecked near "Assurie".
Bilton	United Kingdom	The ship foundered 10 leagues (30 nautical miles (56 km)) west of Sisal, Mexico before 2 March. She was on a voyage from Comarca Lagunera, Mexico to Liverpool, Lancashire.
Cameo	United Kingdom	The East Indiaman was lost off Kedgeree, India. She was on a voyage from Liverpool to Calcutta, India.
Candahar	United Kingdom	The East Indiaman was wrecked near Bombay India.
Clyde	United Kingdom	The ship was wrecked on the Northern Triangles between 20 September and 11 November.
Clarendon	(United Kingdom of Great Britain and Ireland) Jamaica	The schooner was wrecked on the Mosquito Coast before 3 September.
Columbia	United Kingdom	The schooner was wrecked whilst bound for an English port.
Elise Eugenie	France	The ship was wrecked at "Joinville", in the West Indies.
Guilhelm Ludwig	Bremen	The ship was wrecked in the "Garsi Islands" in October or November.
Harmonie	Sweden	The ship was collided with another vessel and was abandoned in the Bay of Biscay before 5 November. Her crew were rescued.
Lady St. Kilda	France	The ship was wrecked on a reef off Tahiti.
Lucky Lass	United Kingdom	The brig was attacked by the local inhabitants in the Nicobar Islands and was scuttled before 27 June. Her crew were murdered.
Nativitas	France	The ship was wrecked at Martinique.
Ocean	United Kingdom	The ship ran aground on the Middle Bank, off the coast of Sierra Leone. She was on a voyage from Liverpool, Lancashire to Sierra Leone. She was consequently condemned.
Roberts	Spain	The brigantine was run ashore and wrecked near Black Point, Sierra Leone before 21 March. She was engaged in the slave trade and was being pursued by HMS Madagascar (Royal Navy).
Rubens	France	The whaler was wrecked in the Marquesas Islands. Her crew were rescued.
Samuel Winter	United Kingdom	The ship was wrecked on Ichaboe Island, Portuguese West Africa before 10 October. Her crew were rescued.
HNLMS "Slewa"	Royal Netherlands Navy	The Brig of War was wrecked on a reef north of "Poeloe-Karang", Netherlands East Indies before 17 April. Her crew were rescued.
HMS Soudan	United Kingdom	The paddle steamer ran aground in the Sierra Leone River and was wrecked.
Success	(United Kingdom of Great Britain and Ireland) New Zealand	The schooner was wrecked in Bluff Harbour, where she had arrived from Otago. The anchor cable fouled while the anchor was being raised, carrying the schooner onto the rocks.
Syrian	United Kingdom	The ship was wrecked at Ichaboe Island before 10 October Her crew were rescued.
Thomas Gelson	United Kingdom	The ship was abandoned in the Atlantic Ocean before 16 September. She was on a voyage from Belfast, County Antrim to Quebec City, Province of Canada, British North America.
Virginie	French Navy	The Artémise-class frigate was reported to have been wrecked whilst on a voyage from Rochefort, Charente-Maritime to Tahiti.
