= List of shipwrecks in 1847 =

The list of shipwrecks in 1847 includes ships sunk, foundered, wrecked, grounded, or otherwise lost during 1847.

table of contents
1847
Jan	Feb	Mar	Apr
May	Jun	Jul	Aug
Sep	Oct	Nov	Dec
Unknown date

== Unknown date ==
List of shipwrecks: Unknown date 1847
Ship	State	Description
Admiral	United States	The sidewheel paddle steamer sank in the Missouri River near Weston, Missouri, apparently in 1847.
Agenoria	United Kingdom	The ship was driven ashore at Kilrush, County Clare. She was refloated on 15 February.
Aristides	United Kingdom	The ship was abandoned in the Indian Ocean south of Madagascar. She was on a voyage from Calcutta, India to the Cape of Good Hope.
Elizabeth	United Kingdom	The ship was driven ashore at Kilrush. She was refloated on 15 February.
Glencoe	United Kingdom	The ship was driven ashore at Kilrush. She was refloated on 17 February.
Iris	Denmark	The ship was lost on the coast of Brazil. Her crew were rescued.
La Petite Ernestine	France	The ship was lost in the Bay of Biscay. Her crew were rescued by the schooner Harp (United Kingdom).
Lucretia	United Kingdom	The ship was wrecked off Point Spirito Santo, on the west coast of South America. Her crew were rescued. She was on a voyage from Liverpool to Punta Arenas, Chile and Guatemala City, Guatemala.
Malabar	France	The ship was wrecked whilst on a voyage from Coringa, India to the Île Bourbon.
Mars	United Kingdom	The ship was driven ashore at Kilrush. She was refloated on 15 February.
Mary Jane	(United Kingdom of Great Britain and Ireland) British North America	The brig was wrecked at Shelburne, Nova Scotia. She was on a voyage from Sydney, Nova Scotia to Boston, Massachusetts, United States.
Monmouth	United States	The ship ran aground on the Mosella Reef. She was refloated with assistance from Republican (United States) and taken in to Key West, Florida.
Socrates	Russia	The ship was wrecked at Marseille, Bouches-du-Rhône one Wednesday in January or February.
Sylphide	Belgium	The ship was wrecked on the coast of Africa. She was on a voyage from Bahia, Brazil to Antwerp.
