= Don de Dieu (disambiguation) =

Don de Dieu (French for 'the gift of God') primarily refers to the ship in which Samuel de Champlain reached present-day Quebec in 1608.

Don de Dieu may also refer to:

== Ships ==
- Don de Dieu, a French warship captured by the British in 1652
- Don de Dieu, a French ship wrecked in 1842 off the French coast
- Don de Dieu, a French ship wrecked in 1846 in the Bay of Biscay
- Don de Dieu, a French fishing smack involved in the rescue of the Eprieve in 1866 in the North Sea
- Don de Dieu, a French ship wrecked in 1870 in Saaremma, Russia

== Other uses ==
- Don de Dieu, a Canadian ale produced by Unibroue
- Don de Dieu, a 2009 album by DJ Arafat
