= DJ Arafat discography =

Ange Didier Houon (26 January 1986 – 12 August 2019), also known as DJ Arafat, or Arafat Muana and by various other stage names, was an Ivorian DJ and singer, who made music in the Coupé-Décalé genre. "Dosabado", "Kpangor", "Zoropoto", "Enfant Beni" and "Moto, Moto" were some of his major hits. He was popular among in French-speaking Africa. He was awarded the "best artist of the year" at the Coupé-Decalé Awards in the year 2016 and 2017.

== Discography ==
=== Albums ===
| Year | Title | Label |
|---|---|---|
| 2003 | Goudron noir | Obouo Music |
| 2005 | Femmes | Obouo Music |
| 2009 | Don de Dieu | Obouo Music |
| 2010 | Gladiator | Nouvelle Donne |
| 2011 | Faison la fete | Obouo Music |
| 2012 | Baisboula Areguede | World Music |
| 2012 | Kpankaka | Obouo Productions |
| 2013 | Chebeler | Obouo Music |
| 2013 | Yorogang Vol. 1 | Akwaba |
| 2013 | Yorogang Vol. 2 | Akwaba |
| 2017 | Yorogang | Monstre Marin Corporation |
| 2018 | Renaissance | Universal Music Africa |

=== Singles ===
- 2003 : "Hommage A Jonathan" (with Mulukuku DJ)
- 2008 : "African Tonik" with Mokobé, Mohamed Lamine and Mory Kante
- 2009 : "Gladiator"
- 2010 : "Sao Tao en Lil Wayne" (with Yvan Trésor)
- 2010 : "Hymne officiel des Elephants pour Orange foot"
- 2010 : "Digital"
- 2014 : "Gbinchin Pintin"
- 2014 : "2 Matin 3 le Soir"
- 2014 : "Yele Lele"
- 2016 : "Agbangnan"
- 2016 : "Mouvement Patata"
- 2016 : "Eto'o Fils"
- 2016 : "Je Gagne Temps"
- 2016 : "Maplorly"
- 2017 : "Enfant béni"
- 2017 : "Faut Chercher Pour Toi"
- 2018 : "Dosabado"
- 2018 : "Tapis Vélo Afro Trap"
- 2018 : "Ca Bouai"
- 2019 : "Moto Moto"
- 2020 : "Kong"

=== Musical collaborations ===
| Year | Title | Collaborators | Album |
|---|---|---|---|
| 2003 | "Atalaku" | DJ Jacob and DJ Arsenal and Gadji Celi | — |
| 2003 | "Boucan" | Molaré & DJ Lewis | Boucan |
| 2005 | "On va sauter" | — | Grand Maquis |
| 2006 | "Pipo" | DJ Caloudji DJ TV5 & Serpent noir DJ | Mister Black Hits |
| 2006 | "Mastiboulance" | Papa Ministre and DJ Lewis | — |
| 2006 | "Tu fais malin" | Erickson Le Zulu | Africa wanted Vol. 3 |
| 2007 | "Mon ami" | DJ Rodrigue | — |
| 2008 | "On aime trop ça" | Alibi Montana | Coupé Décalé Mania Volume 2 |
| 2008 | "Kpangor reload" | Vetcho Lolas | — |
| 2009 | "Reinta Fouinta" | Debordo Leekunfa & Claire Bailly | — |
| 2009 | "Lebede 2" | Debordo Leekunfa | — |
| 2009 | "Spot 2009 (-18 ans)" | DJ Karter | — |
| 2009 | "Madame Monsieur" | DJ TV3 | — |
| 2009 | "Spécial Sesegnon" | Debordo Leekunfa | — |
| 2007 | "25 25 Arachide reload" | Debordo Leekunfa | — |
| 2009 | "Guedjé wan houssa" | DJ K-Lamite | — |
| 2010 | "Kassamoulé" | Serges Beynaud | — |
| 2010 | "Sauterelle" | Doliziana Debordo | — |
| 2010 | "Zropoto 1" | Media la Fifa | Gladiator2555 |
| 2010 | "Zropoto 2" | DJ Arafat | Zropoto |
| 2010 | "Zropoto 3" | DJ Mix 1er | Zropoto |
| 2016 | "Approchez Regardez" | Kiff No Beat | — |
