= List of shipwrecks in September 1866 =

The list of shipwrecks in September 1866 includes ships sunk, foundered, grounded, or otherwise lost during September 1866.

== 1 September ==
List of shipwrecks: 1 September 1866
Ship	State	Description
Pearl	United Kingdom	The yacht capsized and sank in the Belfast Lough with the loss of all three people on board.
Stockton Packet	United Kingdom	The ship was driven ashore at Hartlepool, County Durham. She was refloated.

== 2 September ==
List of shipwrecks: 2 September 1866
Ship	State	Description
Esperanza	Spain	The ship departed from Newcastle upon Tyne, Northumberland, United Kingdom for Brest, Finistère, France. No further trace, presumed foundered with the loss of all hands.
Rio de Janeiro	Imperial Brazilian Navy	1869 illustration of Rio de Janeiro sinking. Paraguayan War, Battle of Curuzú: The ironclad warship sank immediately with the loss of 53 lives after striking a mine in the Apa River.

== 4 September ==
List of shipwrecks: 4 September 1866
Ship	State	Description
Ivy Green	United Kingdom	The barque foundered 15 nautical miles (28 km) off the Kentish Knock. Her eleven crew were rescued by Eliza (Norway). Ivy Green was on a voyage from South Shields, County Durham to Jamaica.
Majestic	United Kingdom	The ship ran aground at Bonny, Africa. She was on a voyage from Bonny to Liverpool Lancashire.
Tecumseh	United Kingdom	The barque was wrecked at "Auldstage", Sweden. She was on a voyage from South Shields to Kronstadt, Russia.
Tjerby	Norway	The ship ran aground on the Als Riff. She was on a voyage from Leith, Lothian, United Kingdom to Randers.

== 5 September ==
List of shipwrecks: 5 September 1866
Ship	State	Description
Elizabeth Mary Ann	United Kingdom	The ship foundered in the North Sea. Her crew were rescued by the brig George (Netherlands). Elizabeth Mary Ann was on a voyage from Antwerp, Belgium to Kronstadt, Russia.
General Sherman	United States	After several days under attack by Korean forces while stranded on Yanggak island in the Taedong River across from Pyongyang, Korea, the sidewheel paddle steamer was set ablaze by Korean fireboats. Those of her crew who survived to reach shore were massacred by the Koreans.
Isabella	United Kingdom	The ship was lost "on the coast of Clara.
Talisman	United Kingdom	The ship was wrecked on the English Bank, in the River Plate. Her crew survived. She was on a voyage from Cardiff, Glamorgan to Montevideo, Uruguay.

== 6 September ==
List of shipwrecks: 6 September 1866
Ship	State	Description
Arago	France	The lugger was wrecked on the Brake Sand, off the coast of Kent, United Kingdom. Her crew survived. She was on a voyage from Sunderland, County Durham, United Kingdom to L'Orient, Morbihan.
Dickey Sam	United Kingdom	The barque ran aground on the Shipwash Sand, in the North Sea off the coast of Suffolk. She sank the next day with the loss of five of her thirteen crew. Survivors were rescued by the steamship Heron (United Kingdom). Dickey Sam was on a voyage from South Shields, County Durham to Alexandria, Egypt.
Excavator	United Kingdom	The ship was damaged by an on-board explosion at Sunderland.
Hero	United Kingdom	The schooner ran aground on the Middle Sand, in the North Sea off the coast of Essex. She was refloated with the assistance of Louisa (United Kingdom) and taken in the River Colne.
Ross D. Mangles	United Kingdom	The steamship, a collier collided with the steam collier Ryhope (United Kingdom) and sank in the North Sea off Aldeburgh, Suffolk with the loss of a crew member. Ross D. Mangles was on a voyage from the River Thames to the River Tyne.

== 7 September ==
List of shipwrecks: 7 September 1866
Ship	State	Description
Annie Duthie	United Kingdom	The ship was sighted in distress in the Atlantic Ocean whilst on a voyage from South Shields, County Durham to Calcutta, India. Presumed foundered with the loss of all hands.
Bull Lightship	Trinity House	The lightship was run into by a Prussian barque and was severely damaged. She was towed in to Grimsby, Lincolnshire, where she sank.
Eprieve	Belgium	The fishing sloop was run into by a barque in the North Sea and was severely damaged, She was abandoned the next day. Her seven crew were rescued by the fishing smack Don de Dieu (France).

== 8 September ==
List of shipwrecks: 8 September 1866
Ship	State	Description
George	United Kingdom	The brig ran aground on the Newcombe Sand, in the North Sea off the coast of Suffolk. She was on a voyage from Sunderland, County Durham to Rouen, Seine-Inférieure, France. She was refloated and resumed her voyage.
Tina Forbes	United Kingdom	The ship departed from Montreal, Province of Canada, British North America for the Clyde. No further trace, presumed foundered with the loss of all hands.

== 9 September ==
List of shipwrecks: 9 September 1866
Ship	State	Description
T. E. Boyd	United Kingdom	The barque was wrecked on the Tortoise Rock, in the Pescadores and was attacked by pirates. All on board survived. She was on a voyage from Foo Chow Foo, China to Melbourne, Victoria.
Unnamed	Board of Customs	A revenue cruiser was driven ashore and wrecked at the Old Head of Kinsale, County Cork. Her crew were rescued.

== 10 September ==
List of shipwrecks: 10 September 1866
Ship	State	Description
Chasseur	France	The brig was wrecked on the Greengrounds, in the Bristol Channel. Her crew were rescued by the tug Tweed (United Kingdom). Chasseur was on a voyage from Swansea, Glamorgan, United Kingdom to Barcelona, Spain.
Maritzberg	United Kingdom	The barque foundered in the Atlantic Ocean more than 700 nautical miles (1,300 km) off Cape Clear Island, County Cork, United Kingdom. Her crew took to a skiff. They were rescued on 15 September by Cambrian (United Kingdom). Maritzburg was on a voyage from Montreal, Province of Canada, British North America to London, United Kingdom.
Nicholas Harvey	United Kingdom	The brigantine ran aground at Hayle, Cornwall. Her crew were rescued by the Hayle Lifeboat Isis ( Royal National Lifeboat Institution).
Rosabelle	United Kingdom	The sailing barge was run down by a brig and sank in the River Thames at Northfleet, Kent with the loss of two of the three people on board.
Will o' the Wisp	(United Kingdom) British North America	The ship was wrecked in Bay St Lawrence. She was on a voyage from Halifax, Nova Scotia to Quebec City, Province of Canada.

== 11 September ==
List of shipwrecks: 11 September 1866
Ship	State	Description
Akbar	United Kingdom	The reformatory ship was run into by the barque Isabella in the River Mersey and was severely damaged.
Alice Woods	United Kingdom	The ship was wrecked on the Dogger Bank, in the Irish Sea. She was on a voyage from Saint John, New Brunswick, British North America to Liverpool, Lancashire.
Bhima	(United Kingdom) India	The steamship collided with the steamship Nada (India) and sank in the Red Sea 180 nautical miles (330 km) from Suez, Egypt with the loss of 79 of the 101 people on board. She was on a voyage from Bombay to Suez.
G. A. Holt	United Kingdom	The barque ran against the pier at Birkenhead, Cheshire and was severely damaged. She was on a voyage from Liverpool to Aden.
George Douthwaite	United Kingdom	The barque ran aground on the Shipwash Sand, in the North Sea off the coast of Suffolk. She was on a voyage from South Shields, County Durham to Point De Galle, Ceylon. She was refloated and put in to Great Yarmouth, Norfolk.
I. Benjamin	United States	The ship struck a landing stage at Birkenhead and was severely damaged. She was on a voyage from Philadelphia, Pennsylvania to Liverpool.
John Bunyan	United Kingdom	The ship was run into by the steamship Ariel (United Kingdom) in the River Mersey and was severely damaged. John Bunyan was on a voyage from Liverpool to Bombay. She was taken in to Liverpool for repairs.
Mary Anne	United Kingdom	The barque was wrecked near Tralee, County Kerry with the loss of two of her fourteen crew. Survivors were rescued by the Coastguard. She was on a voyage from Quebec City, Province of Canada, British North America to Exmouth, Devon.

== 12 September ==
List of shipwrecks: 12 September 1866
Ship	State	Description
Culgoa	(United Kingdom) New Zealand	The barque went aground on a bar in Hokianga Harbour.
Duchess of Portland	United Kingdom	The brig was taken in to Ramsgate, Kent in a derelict condition. She had been on a voyage from Sunderland, County Durham to
Foyle	United Kingdom	The paddle steamer collided with the steamship Collingwood (United Kingdom) and was beached in the River Thames at Barking, Essex. Her 60 passengers were taken off by a sailing barge and she subsequently sank. She was on a voyage from Dublin to London.

== 13 September ==
List of shipwrecks: 13 September 1866
Ship	State	Description
Atlantic	United Kingdom	The brig sprang a leak and was abandoned off Heligoland. Her crew were rescued on 15 September by the schooner Johanna (Hamburg). Atlantic was on a voyage from Hamburg to West Hartlepool, County Durham.
Diana	United Kingdom	The ship was driven ashore near Caernarfon.
Scarlet Flower	United Kingdom	The ship was destroyed by fire at Antwerp, Belgium.

== 14 September ==
List of shipwrecks: 14 September 1866
Ship	State	Description
Burmah	United Kingdom	The ship departed from Manzanilla, Trinidad for Cuba. No further trace, presumed foundered with the loss of all hands.
East Cornwall	United Kingdom	The schooner collided with the steamship Cobden (United Kingdom) and foundered off Aldeburgh, Suffolk with the loss of three of her crew. Survivors were rescued by Cobden. East Cornwall was on a voyage from the River Tyne to Plymouth, Devon.
Louisa Braginton	United Kingdom	The ship departed from New York, United States for a British port. No further trace, presumed foundered with the loss of all hands.
Thalestris	United Kingdom	The ship departed from Puerto Rico for the Clyde. No further trace, presumed foundered with the loss of all hands.
Wallaby	(United Kingdom) New South Wales	The steamship was driven ashore at Cape Farewell, New Zealand. She was later refloated.

== 15 September ==
List of shipwrecks: 15 September 1866
Ship	State	Description
George T. Marsh	United States	The schooner foundered off the Magdalen Islands, Nova Scotia, British North America. All on board were rescued. She was on a voyage from Greenland to Philadelphia, Pennsylvania.
Jamaica Packet	United Kingdom	The ship ran aground near Egremont, Lancashire. She was on a voyage from Liverpool, Lancashire to London.
Marie Berthe	France	The ship ran aground and sank off "Normontiers". Her crew were rescued. She was on a voyage from Dinan, Côtes-du-Nord to Havre de Grâce, Seine-Inférieure.
Onward	United Kingdom	The barque was wrecked off the Isla Gorriti, Uruguay. Her crew were rescued by a pilot boat. She was on a voyage from Cardiff, Glamorgan to Rosario, Argentina.
Reliance	(United Kingdom) Guernsey	The brig ran aground on the Girdler Sand, in the Thames Estuary. She floated off but sank in the Prince's Channel with the loss of four of her seven crew. Survivors were rescued by the barque Kingdom of Fife (United Kingdom). Reliance was on a voyage from Guernsey to the River Thames.
Three Sisters	(United Kingdom) New Zealand	The schooner was en route from Dunedin to Greymouth when she was caught in a gale. The captain attempted to put her into Nelson Harbour for safety, but she hit Arrow Rock and foundered.

== 16 September ==
List of shipwrecks: 16 September 1866
Ship	State	Description
Daniel	United Kingdom	The schooner was driven ashore at Lowestoft, Suffolk. Her six crew were rescued by the Coastguard using rocket apparatus. She was on a voyage from Middlesbrough, Yorkshire to Paignton, Devon.
Eva	United Kingdom	The sloop was driven ashore at Lowestoft. Her crew were rescued. She was on a voyage from Goole, Yorkshire to Harwich, Essex.
Mouche	France	The steamboat suffered a boiler explosion in the Rhône. Six people were killed.

== 17 September ==
List of shipwrecks: 17 September 1866
Ship	State	Description
Caprice	United Kingdom	The ship was wrecked on the English Bank, in the River Plate. Her crew were rescued. She was on a voyage from Rio de Janeiro, Brazil to Montevideo, Uruguay.

== 18 September ==
List of shipwrecks: 18 September 1866
Ship	State	Description
Emilie	United Kingdom	The schooner sank in five minutes after hitting the Seven Stones reef, between the Isles of Scilly and Cornwall, England, in fog while bound from Poole for Runcorn, England. Her crew of five survived.
Rival	United Kingdom	The schooner foundered off Juist, Kingdom of Hanover with the loss of all hands. She was on a voyage from Leith, Lothian to Rotterdam, South Holland, Netherlands; or from St. Monance, Fife to Schiedam, South Holland
Toms	United Kingdom	The brig foundered in the North Sea 30 nautical miles (56 km) off the Newarp Sandbank. Her crew survived. She was on a voyage from South Shields, County Durham to Rotterdam, South Holland, Netherlands.
Xiste	France	The brig collided with the steamship Rota (Portugal) and foundered off the North Foreland, Kent, United Kingdom. Her crew survived. She was on a voyage from Sunderland, County Durham to Saint-Nazaire, Loire-Inférieure, France.

== 19 September ==
List of shipwrecks: 19 September 1866
Ship	State	Description
Emilie	Spain	The ship was wrecked on the Isla de Lobos, Uruguay. Her crew were rescued. She was on a voyage from Cádiz to Montevideo, Uruguay.
Helena	United Kingdom	The ship departed from St. Jago de Cuba, Cuba for the English Channel. No further trace, presumed foundered with the loss of all hands.
Mountaineer	United Kingdom	The brig ran aground on the Scroby Sands, Norfolk. She was on a voyage from South Shields, County Durham to London. She was refloated and beached at Great Yarmouth, Norfolk, where she was wrecked. Her nine crew were rescued.
Robert	France	The ship was driven ashore at Dinas Dinlle, Caernarfonshire, United Kingdom. Her crew were rescued. She was on a voyage from Saint-Malo, Ille-et-Vilaine to Swansea, Glamorgan, United Kingdom.
Sarah	United Kingdom	The ship departed from Blanc-Sablon, Province of Canada, British North America for Queenstown, County Cork. No further trace, presumed foundered with the loss of all hands.
Sardinian	United Kingdom	The ship was abandoned in the Atlantic Ocean (11°00′N 25°00′W), on a voyage from Rangoon, Burma to Liverpool, England, with rice. Captain, wife and all 22 crew rescued by Anne Kay and Royal Family (both United Kingdom).

== 20 September ==
List of shipwrecks: 20 September 1866
Ship	State	Description
Ellen Roger	United Kingdom	The ship was wrecked on the Belvidere Reef, in the Gaspar Strait. She was on a voyage from Foo Chow Foo, China to London.
Fanny	United Kingdom	The fishing smack collided with the steamship Colombia (United Kingdom) and sank in the River Mersey with the loss of four of her crew.
Fortuna	United Kingdom	The ship was driven ashore at the South Foreland, Kent. She was on a voyage from Middlesbrough, Yorkshire to Boston, Massachusetts, United States. She was refloated and taken in to Ramsgate, Kent.

== 21 September ==
List of shipwrecks: 21 September 1866
Ship	State	Description
Carmelite	United Kingdom	The brig foundered. Her crew were rescued.
Notre Dame	France	The ship foundered in a hurricane in the Atlantic Ocean with the loss of all but one of her crew. The survivor was rescued on 25 September by Esperanza (United States). Notre Dame was on a voyage from St. Jago de Cuba, Cuba to Bordeaux, Gironde.
Sceptre	United Kingdom	The brig was driven ashore at Redcar, Yorkshire. She was refloated and towed in to Sunderland, County Durham.
Thane	(United Kingdom) New South Wales	The steamer was wrecked when she stranded on the bar at the mouth of New Zealand's Grey River while leaving Greymouth for Sydney with a load of coal.

== 22 September ==
List of shipwrecks: 22 September 1866
Ship	State	Description
Abondance	French Navy	The transport ship was wrecked at St. Pierre and Miquelon with the loss of three of her crew.
Eliza	United Kingdom	The schooner sank off the Goodwin Sands, Kent. Her crew survived.
May Flower	United Kingdom	The brig was driven ashore and wrecked at Boulogne, Pas-de-Calais, France with the loss of four of her five crew. She was on a voyage from Sunderland, County Durham to Le Tréport, Seine-Inférieure.
Five unnamed vessels	France	Five merchant ships were wrecked at St. Pierre and Miquelon with the loss of 70 lives.

== 23 September ==
List of shipwrecks: 23 September 1866
Ship	State	Description
Duo	United Kingdom	The brig was driven ashore at Ness Point, Suffolk. She was on a voyage from South Shields, County Durham to Rouen, Seine-Inférieure, France. She was refloated and taken in to Lowestoft, Suffolk.
Marie Elizabeth	United Kingdom	The ship sprang a leak and was abandoned in the Atlantic Ocean. Her crew were rescued by Willebrand (United States). Marie Elizabeth was on a voyage from Hull, Yorkshire to Quebec City, Province of Canada, British North America.

== 24 September ==
List of shipwrecks: 24 September 1866
Ship	State	Description
Boaz	United Kingdom	The ship was driven ashore at Hornsea, Yorkshire. She was refloated and resumed her voyage.
Dove	United Kingdom	The brig foundered in the North Sea 14 nautical miles (26 km) off Hartlepool, County Durham. Her seven crew survived. She was on a voyage from the River Tyne to London.
Ellen	United Kingdom	The schooner ran aground at Lowestoft, Suffolk. She was refloated and taken in to Lowestoft in a leaky condition.
Jane and Mary	United Kingdom	The ship departed from "Launce-a-Loup" for Teignmouth, Devon. No further trace, presumed foundered with the loss of all hands.
Ladyburn	United Kingdom	The paddle steamer sprang a leak and foundered in the North Sea 50 nautical miles (93 km) east of Terschelling, Friesland, Netherlands. Her crew were rescued by Trident (United Kingdom). Ladyburn was on a voyage from Tønning, Duchy of Holstein to London.
Oscar	Austrian Empire	The brig was lost off Pernambuco, Brazil.
Sheridan	United States	The screw steamer was lost through stranding.
Thomas	United Kingdom	The ship was sunk at Stockton-on-Tees, County Durham when a load of iron rails was dropped, holing her. She was refloated and towed to Middlesbrough, Yorkshire for repair.
Warrior Queen	United Kingdom	The barque ran aground on the Droogden, in the Baltic Sea.

== 25 September ==
List of shipwrecks: 25 September 1866
Ship	State	Description
Minerva	United Kingdom	The schooner ran aground in the River Ribble. She was on a voyage from Wicklow to Lancaster, Lancashire.
Niger	United Kingdom	The ship ran aground on Neckman's Ground, in the Baltic Sea. She was on a voyage from the River Wear to Kronstadt, Russia. She was refloated and put in to Reval, Russia in a leaky condition.

== 26 September ==
List of shipwrecks: 26 September 1866
Ship	State	Description
Jeune Charles	France	The ship foundered in the North Sea off Happisburgh, Norfolk, United Kingdom. Her crew were rescued. She was on a voyage from Boulogne, Pas-de-Calais to Sunderland, County Durham, United Kingdom.
Maria Elizabeth	United Kingdom	The ship was abandoned in the Atlantic Ocean 600 nautical miles (1,100 km) east of the Grand Banks of Newfoundland. Her crew were rescued by the brig Willibrand (United States). Maria Elizabeth was on a voyage from Hull, Yorkshire to Quebec City, Province of Canada, British North America.

== 27 September ==
List of shipwrecks: 27 September 1866
Ship	State	Description
Ontario	United States	The 489-ton whaling bark was abandoned in the Chukchi Sea at 70 degrees 25 minutes North latitude after she collided with the whaling bark Helen Mar (United States). She floated through the Bering Strait as a derelict during the winter of 1866–1867, eventually washing ashore on the coast of the Russian Empire in Siberia, 9 nautical miles (17 km) north of Cape Chaplino in Chukotka.

== 29 September ==
List of shipwrecks: 29 September 1866
Ship	State	Description
Caroline	United Kingdom	The steamship ran ashore in the Dardanelles.
Delta	United Kingdom	The ship ran aground on Rotskar, Russia. She was refloated and taken in to Kronstadt, Russia.
Edward	Bremen	The schooner was wrecked near Taiwanfoo, Formosa. Her crew were rescued.

== 30 September ==
List of shipwrecks: 30 September 1866
Ship	State	Description
Kwang Foong	United Kingdom	The ship was wrecked off the coast of Formosa. Her crew were rescued. She was on a voyage from Niuzhuang to Whampoa, China.
M. A. Lewis	(United Kingdom) British North America	The barque was wrecked in the Turks Islands.
Morna	United Kingdom	The ship ran aground at Flamborough Head, East Riding of Yorkshire. She was on a voyage from London to Leith, Lothian. She was refloated and resumed her voyage.

== Unknown date ==
List of shipwrecks: Unknown date in September 1866
Ship	State	Description
Ada G. York	United States	The ship was wrecked on Cape Sable Island, Nova Scotia, British North America. She was on a voyage from New Orleans, Louisiana to Liverpool, Lancashire, United Kingdom.
Aurora	United Kingdom	The barque was abandoned in the Atlantic Ocean before 29 September. The drifting derelict was last seen on 13 October about 100 nautical miles (190 km) west of Cape St. Vincent, Portugal, in (37°00′N 11°00′W).
Cornelia	United Kingdom	The ship was destroyed by fire off St. Paul Island, Nova Scotia. Her crew were rescued. She was on a voyage from Leith, Lothian to Quebec City, Province of Canada, British North America.
Ellen	United Kingdom	The ship foundered in the North Sea. Her crew were rescued. She was on a voyage from Hartlepool, County Durham to Kronstadt.
Esperance	United Kingdom	The ship was abandoned in the Atlantic Ocean off the Azores. Her crew were rescued. She was on a voyage from Wilmington, Delaware to Liverpool.
Eunice	United Kingdom	The ship was abandoned at sea before 23 September. Her crew survived.
General Sale	United Kingdom	The ship was wrecked near "Beersimio", British North America before 27 September. She was on a voyage from Sunderland, County Durham to Quebec City.
George J. Marsh	United States	The schooner was lost near the Magdalen Islands while on the passage from Ivitgut, Greenland. Crew saved.
Hawthorn	United Kingdom	The ship foundered off the coast of Kent on or before 18 September. Her crew survived. She was on a voyage from Sunderland to Rotterdam, South Holland, Netherlands.
Hector	United Kingdom	The steamship ran aground on the Englishman's Shoal, in the Dardanelles. She was on a voyage from Malta to Odesa, Russia.
Humboldt	United States	The ship was lost whilst on a voyage from Cuxhaven to New York.
Huquay	United Kingdom	The steamship was destroyed by fire at Shanghai, China.
J. G. Marsh	United States	The ship was wrecked before 27 September. She was on a voyage from Greenland to Philadelphia, Pennsylvania.
Lavinia	United Kingdom	The ship was driven ashore near Wells-next-the-Sea, Norfolk before 23 September. She was on a voyage from Schiedam, South Holland, Netherlands to South Shields, County Durham. She was refloated on 25 September.
Margaret Elizabeth	United Kingdom	The brigantine sank on the West Hoyle Sandbank, in Liverpool Bay. She was refloated on 6 September.
Morielle	France	The brig was wrecked on the coast of Iceland. Her ten crew were rescued by the yacht Emanuel (Denmark).
Oyapock	United Kingdom	The ship was wrecked in the River Plate before 20 September.
Retriever	United Kingdom	The ship was driven ashore on Green Island, British North America before 28 September. She was on a voyage from Liverpool to Quebec City. She was refloated.
Rising Dawn	United States	The ship was wrecked before 27 September. She was on a voyage from Greenland to Philadelphia.
San Francisco	Brazil	The transport ship was destroyed by fire at Buenos Aires, Argentina.
Severn	United Kingdom	The ship foundered 1 nautical mile (1.9 km) off Cape Melazzo, Sicily, Italy. Her crew survived. She was on a voyage from Cardiff, Glamorgan to Messina, Sicily.
Tickler	United Kingdom	The ship was wrecked on Eleuthera, Bahamas in late September. Her crew were rescued. She was on a voyage from New York to Havana, Cuba.
Zoe	United Kingdom	The schooner was driven ashore and wrecked at Appledore, Devon.
