= List of shipwrecks in August 1842 =

The list of shipwrecks in August 1842 includes ships sunk, foundered, wrecked, grounded, or otherwise lost during August 1842.

== 1 August ==
List of shipwrecks: 1 August 1842
Ship	State	Description
Maria	United Kingdom	The ship was driven ashore west of Hayle, Cornwall. She was refloated on 8 August and taken into Hayle.
Maryborough	United Kingdom	The ship struck the Cabezat Rocks and was damaged. She was on a voyage from Kertch, Russia to Cork. She consequently put into Gibraltar on 5 August.

== 2 August ==
List of shipwrecks: 2 August 1842
Ship	State	Description
Autumn	United Kingdom	The brig ran aground on the Arklow Bank, in the Irish Sea off the coast of County Wicklow.
Margaret	United Kingdom	The ship ran aground in the Castletown River near Soldier's Point, County Louth. She was on a voyage from Swansea, Glamorgan to Dundalk, County Louth.
Oracle	United Kingdom	The ship was driven ashore at Dungarvan, County Antrim. She was on a voyage from Waterford to Caernarfon. Oracle was refloated and put back to Waterford.
Scipio	United Kingdom	The ship ran aground and was severely damaged in the River Severn. She was on a voyage from Marseille, Bouches-du-Rhône, France to Gloucester.
Sophia	Norway	The ship was driven ashore on Messing Island, in Christianafjord. She was on a voyage from Liverpool, Lancashire, United Kingdom to "Walloe". She was refloated and resumed her voyage.
Splendid	United States	The ship was in collision with the steamship Narrangasset (United Kingdom) and foundered in the Atlantic Ocean off New London, Connecticut. She was on a voyage from New York to Bangor, Maine.
Victoria	United Kingdom	The ship ran aground and was severely damaged in the River Usk at Newport, Monmouthshire.

== 3 August ==
List of shipwrecks: 3 August 1842
Ship	State	Description
Anne	United Kingdom	The ship was driven ashore near Marske-by-the-Sea, Yorkshire. She was on a voyage from South Shields, County Durham to Budleigh Salterton, Devon.
Marquis of Douro	United Kingdom	The ship was driven ashore on Knock John, in the White Sea. She was on a voyage from Arkhangelsk, Russia to London. She was refloated and beached on the coast of Lapland.

== 4 August ==
List of shipwrecks: 4 August 1842
Ship	State	Description
Amphitrite	United Kingdom	The ship was driven ashore at Flamborough Head, Yorkshire. She was refloated the next day and resumed her voyage.
Autumn	United Kingdom	The ship ran aground on the Arklow Bank, in the Irish Sea off the coast of County Wicklow. She was on a voyage from Susa, Beylik of Tunis to Dublin.
Phœnix	United Kingdom	The ship was driven ashore and sank in Loch Laxford. Her crew were rescued. She was on a voyage from Peterhead, Aberdeenshire to Liverpool, Lancashire.
Robert	United Kingdom	The ship ran aground at Dublin. She was on a voyage from Barletta, Kingdom of the Two Sicilies to Dublin. She was refloated on 6 August and taken into Dublin.
Swatara	United Kingdom	The ship ran aground in the Mississippi River. She was on a voyage from New Orleans, Louisiana, United States to Liverpool.

== 5 August ==
List of shipwrecks: 5 August 1842
Ship	State	Description
Louisa	United Kingdom	The sloop was driven ashore and wrecked at Arbroath, Forfarshire.

== 6 August ==
List of shipwrecks: 6 August 1842
Ship	State	Description
Liverpool	United Kingdom	The transport ship, a brig, ran aground in the Yangtze River. She was set afire and destroyed in September.
Sabina	Spain	The ship was wrecked on a reef off Cape Recife, Cape Colony with the loss of 20 lives.

== 7 August ==
List of shipwrecks: 7 August 1842
Ship	State	Description
Good Intent	United Kingdom	The ship ran aground and was damaged at Liverpool, Lancashire. She was on a voyage from Richibucto, New Brunswick, British North America to Liverpool. Good Intent was refloated and taken into Liverpool.
Greenwell	United Kingdom	The ship ran aground in the Swine Bottoms, off the coast of Denmark. She was on a voyage from Saint Petersburg, Russia to London. She was refloated and put into Helsingør, Denmark for repairs.
Sabina	Spain	The full-rigged ship foundered off Cape Recife, Africa with the loss of 22 of the 62 people on board. Survivors were rescued by Henry Hoyle (United Kingdom). Sabina was on a voyage from Manila, Spanish East Indies to Cádiz.
Supply	United Kingdom	The ship ran aground on the North Bank, in Liverpool Bay. She was on a voyage from Liverpool to Cuba. Supply was refloated and put back to Liverpool.

== 8 August ==
List of shipwrecks: 8 August 1842
Ship	State	Description
Hamilton	United Kingdom	The ship was driven ashore in Table Bay.

== 9 August ==
List of shipwrecks: 9 August 1842
Ship	State	Description
Kate	United States	The brig was wrecked on a reef south of Henequa, Bahamas. She was on a voyage from Port-au-Prince, Haiti to Boston, Massachusetts.
Pilot	United Kingdom	The sloop ran aground on the Chapel Rocks, in the River Severn and capsized. She was on a voyage from Cork to Gloucester.

== 10 August ==
List of shipwrecks: 10 August 1842
Ship	State	Description
Clifford	United Kingdom	The ship was wrecked on a reef in the Torres Straits. Her crew were rescued by Isabella and Tomatin (both United Kingdom). She was on a voyage from New Zealand to Singapore.
Duc d'Orleans	United States	The ship was driven ashore south of Philadelphia, Pennsylvania. She was on a voyage from Livorno, Grand Duchy of Tuscany to Philadelphia. She was refloated the next day and resumed her voyage.
Laurel	United Kingdom	The ship ran aground and was severely damaged at Liverpool, Lancashire. She was on a voyage from Quebec City, Province of Canada, British North America to Liverpool.
Maryta	United Kingdom	The ship was wrecked in the Torres Straits. Her crew were rescued by Gipsy (United Kingdom).

== 11 August ==
List of shipwrecks: 11 August 1842
Ship	State	Description
Comet	United Kingdom	The ship was driven ashore on Long Island, Nova Scotia, British North America. She was on a voyage from Saint John, New Brunswick, British North America to Cork. Comet was refloated and towed into Brier Island, Nova Scotia.
Coquette	United Kingdom	The ship ran aground on the Batten Reef, in the Cattewater. She was on a voyage from Plymouth, Devon to Newcastle upon Tyne, Northumberland. Coquette was refloated and resumed her voyage.
Kate	(United Kingdom of Great Britain and Ireland) New Zealand	The schooner was wrecked on a reef off Cape Terawhiti.
Maraboo	United Kingdom	The ship ran aground on the Bird Rock. She was on a voyage from Jamaica to London. She was refloated and put into Nassau, Bahamas.
Tynemouth Castle	United Kingdom	The ship ran aground on the Black Middens, in the North Sea off the coast of County Durham. She was on a voyage from Quebec City, Province of Canada, British North America to South Shields, County Durham. She was refloated and put into South Shields.

== 12 August ==
List of shipwrecks: 12 August 1842
Ship	State	Description
Eliza and Ellen	United Kingdom	The ship ran aground on the Newcombe Sand, in the English Channel. She was on a voyage from London to Gloucester. She was refloated.
Melona	United Kingdom	The ship ran aground off Torsari Island, Finland. She was on a voyage from Newcastle upon Tyne, Northumberland to Saint Petersburg, Russia. She was later refloated, and completed her voyage on 15 September.
Speculator	(United Kingdom of Great Britain and Ireland) New Zealand	The ship departed from Mercury Bay for Wellington. No further trace, presumed foundered with the loss of all on board.

== 13 August ==
List of shipwrecks: 13 August 1842
Ship	State	Description
Comet	United Kingdom	The ship struck a sunken wreck and was beached at Lowestoft, Suffolk. She was on a voyage from Colchester, Essex to South Shields, County Durham.

== 14 August ==
List of shipwrecks: 14 August 1842
Ship	State	Description
Duchess of Bucclech	United Kingdom	The ship was wrecked on the Jardanillos, in the Gulf of Florida. Her crew were rescued. She was on a voyage from Jamaica to Havana, Cuba.
Malvina	Duchy of Holstein	The ship ran aground at the mouth of the Eider and was severely damaged. She was towed into Tønning in a sinking condition.
Pearl	United Kingdom	The ship was driven ashore at Redcar, Yorkshire. She was on a voyage from London to South Shields, County Durham. She was refloated and resumed her voyage.

== 15 August ==
List of shipwrecks: 15 August 1842
Ship	State	Description
Concord	United Kingdom	The ship ran aground on the Cross Sand, in the North Sea off the coast of Norfolk. She was on a voyage from Gallipoli, Ottoman Empire to Hull, Yorkshire. Concord was refloated and resumed her voyage.
Lady Douglas	United Kingdom	The ship ran aground on the Barber Sand, in the North Sea off the coast of Norfolk. She was on a voyage from Newcastle upon Tyne, Northumberland to Southampton, Hampshire. She was refloated the next day and proceeded on her voyage.

== 16 August ==
List of shipwrecks: 16 August 1842
Ship	State	Description
Circe	French Navy	The corvette ran aground 3 nautical miles (5.6 km) off Port Royal, Jamaica. She was on a voyage from Port Royal to Port-au-Prince, Haiti. Circe was later refloated.
Garland	United Kingdom	The ship was wrecked at Bridgeport, Connecticut, United States.
Ipswich	(United Kingdom of Great Britain and Ireland) Jamaica	The steamship ran aground of a reef 3 nautical miles (5.6 km) off Port Royal whilst going to the assistance of Circe (French Navy). She was later refloated.

== 17 August ==
List of shipwrecks: 17 August 1842
Ship	State	Description
Albion	United Kingdom	The ship foundered off Banff, Aberdeenshire. Her crew were rescued. She was on a voyage from Kirkwall, Orkney Islands to Leith, Lothian.

== 18 August ==
List of shipwrecks: 18 August 1842
Ship	State	Description
George	United Kingdom	The schooner, which had sprung a leak in the Bay of Biscay, hoisted a distress signal. The crew of the brig Seabird (United Kingdom) refused to rescue her crew. They were rescued the next day by the barque Byron (United States) when the ship was off Cape Clear Island, County Donegal. George was on a voyage from Marseille, Bouches-du-Rhône, France to Glasgow, Renfrewshire.
John and Jean	United Kingdom	The ship ran aground on the Scroby Sands, Norfolk. She was on a voyage from Arbroath, Forfarshire to Dunkirk, Nord, France. She was refloated and resumed her voyage.
Minerva	(United Kingdom of Great Britain and Ireland) New South Wales	The schooner was wrecked on a reef in Open Bay, New Zealand. Her crew were rescued.
Robert Harret	United Kingdom	The ship sprang a leak and foundered in the North Sea 20 nautical miles (37 km) south of Lowestoft, Suffolk. Her crew were rescued. She was on a voyage from Caernarfon to Hamburg.

== 19 August ==
List of shipwrecks: 19 August 1842
Ship	State	Description
Friends	United Kingdom	The ship sprang a leak and was beached at Dartmouth, Devon.
Superior	United Kingdom	The ship sprang a leak and was beached at Dartmouth. She was on a voyage from Liverpool, Lancashire to London.

== 20 August ==
List of shipwrecks: 20 August 1842
Ship	State	Description
Eliza	United Kingdom	The smack sank off the north coast of Ireland. Her crew were rescued. She was on a voyage from Bangor to Galway.
Loyalist	United Kingdom	The ship was driven ashore and wrecked on "Langloes Island", British North America. Her crew were rescued. She was on a voyage from Pictou, Nova Scotia, British North America to Hull, Yorkshire.
Maria	United Kingdom	The ship was abandoned in the Atlantic Ocean (55°20′N 10°00′W). Her crew were rescued by Nancy Munro (United Kingdom). Maria was on a voyage from the Clyde to Havana, Cuba.

== 21 August ==
List of shipwrecks: 21 August 1842
Ship	State	Description
Anna	Denmark	The ship was driven ashore near "Sanderhoe". Two crew were rescued.
Lucy	United Kingdom	The ship was wrecked on the cost of Labrador, British North America. Her crew were rescued.
Maria	United Kingdom	The barque was abandoned in the Atlantic Ocean 120 nautical miles (220 km) south west of Ireland. Her fifteen crew were rescued by the schooner Jane (United Kingdom). Maria was on a voyage from the Clyde to Havana, Cuba.
Sable	United Kingdom	The ship was wrecked on the coast of Labrador. Her crew were rescued.
Watchful	United Kingdom	The ship was driven ashore near "Charduck", Ottoman Empire. She was on a voyage from Odesa to Cork. Watchful was refloated with assistance from HMS Stromboli (Royal Navy) and taken into Gallipoli.

== 22 August ==
List of shipwrecks: 22 August 1842
Ship	State	Description
Ashburton	United Kingdom	The ship was destroyed by fire in the Atlantic Ocean 90 nautical miles (170 km) off Lisbon Portugal. She was on a voyage from Vila Nova de Portimao, Portugal to London.
Coq	France	The ship was wrecked at the mouth of the Senegal River. Her crew were rescued.

== 23 August ==
List of shipwrecks: 23 August 1842
Ship	State	Description
Gleaner	United Kingdom	The ship ran aground in the Castletown River. She was on a voyage from Dundalk, County Louth to Glasgow, Renfrewshire.
Thomas Sparks	United Kingdom	The ship struck the Whale Rock, in Table Bay and was damaged. She was on a voyage from London to Sydney, New South Wales and New Zealand.

== 24 August ==
List of shipwrecks: 24 August 1842
Ship	State	Description
Angola	United States	The ship was driven ashore at Brigantine, New Jersey. She was on a voyage from Tarragona, Spain to New York.
Intrepid	United Kingdom	The ship was driven ashore in the Dardanelles. She was on a voyage from London to Constantinople, Ottoman Empire. she was later refloated and resumed her voyage, arriving at Constantinople on 14 September.
Margaret Elizabeth	United Kingdom	The ship ran aground on the Burbo Bank, in Liverpool Bay. She was on a voyage from Liverpool, Lancashire to Brazil. She was refloated and put back to Liverpool.
W. H. Harrison	United States	The ship was driven ashore at Ocracoke, North Carolina. She was later refloated and resumed her voyage to Nassau, Bahamas.

== 25 August ==
List of shipwrecks: 25 August 1842
Ship	State	Description
Oceanus	(United Kingdom of Great Britain and Ireland) British North America	The ship was driven ashore and wrecked on Dominica.

== 26 August ==
List of shipwrecks: 26 August 1842
Ship	State	Description
Elizabeth	(United Kingdom of Great Britain and Ireland) Tortola	The drogher was wrecked in Carroll Bay.

== 27 August ==
List of shipwrecks: 27 August 1842
Ship	State	Description
Jacques Charles	France	The ship departed from Marseille, Bouches-du-Rhône for Rouen, Seine-Inférieure. No further trace, presumed foundered with the loss of all hands.
Nikolay (Николай)	Imperial Russian Navy	The brig was driven ashore at the mouth of the Okhota while departing from Okhotsk. Her crew were rescued. She was dismantled in 1846.

== 28 August ==
List of shipwrecks: 28 August 1842
Ship	State	Description
Abercrombie Robinson	United Kingdom	Abercrombie Robinson. The troopship was wrecked in Table Bay. All on board, over 500 people, were rescued.
Albatross	United Kingdom	The cutter was driven ashore in Table Bay.
Ghika	United Kingdom	The schooner was driven ashore in Algoa Bay. She was on a voyage from London to Algoa Bay. She was consequently condemned, but was refloated on 2 October.
Fairfield	United States	The barque was driven ashore in Algoa Bay. She was consequently condemned.
Henry Hoyle	United Kingdom	The brig was driven ashore in Table Bay. All on board were rescued.
John Bagshaw	United Kingdom	The full-rigged ship was driven ashore in Algoa Bay. She was on a voyage from Calcutta, India to London. She was consequently condemned.
Reform	United Kingdom	The brig was driven ashore in Algoa Bay. She was on a voyage from Algoa Bay to the Breede River. She was consequently condemned.
Saldanha-bay Packet	United Kingdom	The ship was driven ashore at the Cape of Good Hope. She was on a voyage from Cape Town, Cape Colony to Saldanha Bay. She was refloated on 7 October and resumed her voyage.
Tanfield	United States	The ship was driven ashore in Algoa Bay. She was consequently condemned.
Union	Russia	The ship was driven ashore near Falsterbo, Sweden. She was on a voyage from Saint Petersburg to Granville, Manche France. she was refloated and put into Helsingør, Denmark for repairs.
Waterloo	United Kingdom	Waterloo. The convict transport was wrecked at Table Bay with the loss of 189 lives.
Zone	France	The ship departed from Veracruz, Mexico for Bordeaux, Gironde. No further trace, presumed foundered with the loss of all hands.

== 29 August ==
List of shipwrecks: 29 August 1842
Ship	State	Description
James Graham	United Kingdom	The schooner ran aground 2 nautical miles (3.7 km) from the Cabo da Roca, Portugal and was subsequently wrecked. Her crew survived.
Mary Jane	(United Kingdom of Great Britain and Ireland) British North America	The ship was wrecked on the coast of Labrador. Her crew were rescued.
Nancy	(United Kingdom of Great Britain and Ireland) British North America	The ship was wrecked on the coast of Labrador. Her crew were rescued.
Prebene	Denmark	The ship was driven ashore between Helsingborg and "Ra", Sweden. She was on a voyage from Copenhagen to Brazil.

== 30 August ==
List of shipwrecks: 31 August 1842
Ship	State	Description
Ann Maria	United States	The whaler was run down and sunk during a storm in mid Indian Ocean, near Île Saint-Paul, by the whaler Ajax (France). Her crew were rescued.
Avis	United States	The whaler was wrecked in Two Peoples Bay.
James Graham	United Kingdom	The ship was driven ashore north of Cape Razo, Portugal. She was on a voyage from Liverpool, Lancashire to Lisbon, Portugal.
Loyalist	(United Kingdom of Great Britain and Ireland) British North America	The ship was wrecked on "Langlois Island". Her crew were rescued.
Magdalena	Norway	The ship was in collision with Delphin (Prussia) off the Goodwin Sands, Kent, United Kingdom and was abandoned by her crew.
Middlesex	United Kingdom	The full-rigged ship was wrecked near Maceió, Brazil. All on board were rescued. She was on a voyage from Sydney, New South Wales to London.
Prebene	Denmark	The ship was driven ashore between Helsingborg and "Ra". She was on a voyage from Copenhagen to Brazil.
St. Louis	United States	The ship was destroyed by fire whilst on a voyage from Boston, Massachusetts to New Orleans, Louisiana. All on board were rescued by the brig Impulse (United Kingdom).

== 31 August ==
List of shipwrecks: 31 August 1842
Ship	State	Description
Anna Maria	United States	The whaler was in collision with the whaler Ajax (France) and foundered in the Atlantic Ocean off São Paulo, Brazil. Her crew were rescued by Ajax.
Hillgrove	United Kingdom	The ship was driven ashore and wrecked 50 nautical miles (93 km) south of Cape Henry, Virginia, United States. She was on a voyage from Trinidad to Baltimore, Maryland, United States.
Hope	United Kingdom	The ship struck the South Rock and was damaged. She was on a voyage from Newcastle upon Tyne, Northumberland to Swansea, Glamorgan. She put into Donaghadee, County Down in a severely leaky condition and was subsequently towed to Belfast, County Antrim for repairs.
HMS Victor	Royal Navy	The Cruizer-class brig-sloop departed from Veracruz, Mexico for Halifax, Nova Scotia, British North America. No further trace, presumed foundered with the loss of all hands.

== Unknown date ==
List of shipwrecks: Unknown date in August 1842
Ship	State	Description
Agenoria	United Kingdom	The schooner sank in Port Phillip Bay before 12 August.
Clorinde	France	The ship was lost south of "Cape Blanc", Ecuador before 15 August. She was on a voyage from Callao, Peru to Guayaquil, Ecuador.
Eleanor	United Kingdom	The ship was driven ashore in the Dardanelles before 23 August. She was on a voyage from Odesa to Falmouth, Cornwall or Cork. she was later refloated.
Frederick	United Kingdom	The ship was driven ashore and wrecked in the River Severn at Sharpness, Gloucestershire before 22 August. She was on a voyage from Odesa to Gloucester.
Jealous	United Kingdom	The ship was driven ashore and wrecked at Marshchapel, Lincolnshire before 7 August.
Minerva	(United Kingdom of Great Britain and Ireland) New Zealand	The ship was wrecked in Hawke Bay.
Philander	United Kingdom	The ship was abandoned in the Atlantic Ocean before 10 August.
Red Rover	United States	The ship was driven ashore at Lewes, Delaware. She was on a voyage from New York to Montevideo, Uruguay. She was refloated and put back to New York.
Robert	United Kingdom	The ship was driven ashore at Dublin. She was on a voyage from Barletta, Kingdom of the Two Sicilies to Dublin. She was refloated on 4 August.
Sarah and Mary	United Kingdom	The ship was abandoned before 1 September whilst on a voyage from Sligo to London. She was discovered in Mallinby Creek on that date.
Seagull	United Kingdom	The ship was driven ashore at Maldonado, Uruguay before 29 August. She was on a voyage from Liverpool to Montevideo, Uruguay.
Sylphe	France	The ship departed from Bordeaux, Gironde for Lima, Peru. No further trace, presumed foundered with the loss of all hands.
Tynemouth Castle	United Kingdom	The ship ran aground on the Black Middens, in the North Sea off the coast of County Durham. She was refloated on 11 August and taken into South Shields, County Durham.
Vesta	United Kingdom	The ship was driven ashore in the Dardanelles before 23 August. She was on a voyage from Odesa to Falmouth or Cork. She was later refloated.
