= Vetcho Lolas =

- Birth name: Hervé Bié
- Genres: World music, coupé-décalé, soukous, gospel, makossa
- Occupation: Singer
- Instrument(s): Vocals, multi-instrumentalist

Vetcho Lolas (birth name Hervé Bié) is an Ivorian singer, musician, attalakutiste and disc jockey of Guéré origin in the style Coupé-Décalé. He also did some rumba, the religious music and some makossa. Owner of three albums, in the summer 2008 he released through his third album a concept called "Shamakuana", which means "danse des bluffeurs"

== Biography ==
Vetcho Lolas, friend of Shaggy Sharufa and N'Guessan Amessan, said Bébi Philippe worked as a disc jockey in one of the biggest maquis Abidjanais. It was as a DJ that he for a long time silently contributed to a lot of artistes of the register coupé-décalé. Similarly to most Ivoirian disc-jockeys, he decide to produce in music, releasing his first song entitled "Couvre-feu" in 2002 with the dance group Lolas which he had joined in 1999. Afterwards he released a single named "la moulance". After this pièce he releases his second album entitled chipeur, arrête de chiper, which was a total flop. Then, in 2007, he produced for a young sound engineer named N'Guessan Amessan and released a fourth disco graphical piece where he debuts a new concept of dance entitled "La Gbèlèche".

Even though his four pieces, the disc jockey of multiple talents stayed in the shadows. He met success in summer 2008 when he released his third album which he recorded at N'Guessan Amessan house entitled La Shamakuana or Shamakoana, which means "la danse des bloffeurs", produced by Georgy the best and Jérôme Zoma. Since August 2008, this concept has stayed at the top of the hit list in the Côte d'Ivoire. This concept was in fact for Tous ceux qui aiment faire le malin et se distinguer selon son créateur même. Which means "for all of those how love doing the smartass and be distinguished".

== Discographie ==
=== Albums ===
- 2002 – Couvre-feu (with the groupe Lolas)
- 2007 – Chipeur, arrête de chiper
- 2008 – La Shamakuana

=== Single ===
- 2006 – La moulance
- 2007 – La Gbèlèche

== See also ==
- Coupé-Décalé
