= List of shipwrecks in August 1846 =

The list of shipwrecks in August 1846 includes ships sunk, foundered, wrecked, grounded, or otherwise lost during the month of August 1846.

== 1 August ==
List of shipwrecks: 1 August 1846
Ship	State	Description
Frederick VI	Denmark	The ship ran aground on a shoal off Bintary Island. She was on a voyage from London, United Kingdom to Singapore. She was abandoned on 15 August. Her crew were rescued.
Wiettgenstein	Stralsund	The schooner was driven ashore on the east coast of Coquet Island, Northumberland, United Kingdom. She was on a voyage from Belfast, County Antrim to Newcastle upon Tyne, Northumberland, She was refloated and towed in to Warkworth, Northumberland for repairs.

== 2 August ==
List of shipwrecks: 2 August 1846
Ship	State	Description
Sir F. B. Head	United Kingdom	The ship capsized at Plymouth, Devon. She was refloated the next day.

== 3 August ==
List of shipwrecks: 3 August 1846
Ship	State	Description
Blessing	United Kingdom	The ship was driven ashore on Anticosti Island, Province of Canada, British North America. She was on a voyage from Quebec City, Province of Canada to South Shields, County Durham. She was refloated and resumed her voyage.

== 4 August ==
List of shipwrecks: 4 August 1846
Ship	State	Description
Brazilian	United States	The ship was driven ashore in the Tusket Islands, Nova Scotia, British North America. She was on a voyage from a port in Maine to Pictou, Nova Scotia. She was refloated on 8 August and taken in to Yarmouth, Nova Scotia for repairs.
Donde Duis	France	The ship struck the Roche Anglaise and foundered. Her crew were rescued. She was on a voyage from Sunderland, County Durham, United Kingdom to Bordeaux, Gironde.
President	Bremen	The brig was wrecked at Guarico Point, Cuba. Her crew were rescued. She was on a voyage from Saint Thomas, Virgin Islands to "Xibara".

== 5 August ==
List of shipwrecks: 5 August 1846
Ship	State	Description
China	United Kingdom	The barque ran aground on the Manicougan Shoals, in the Saint Lawrence River.
Don de Dieu	France	The ship foundered in the Bay of Biscay off Rochefort, Charente-Maritime. Her crew were rescued She was on a voyage from Sunderland, County Durham, United Kingdom to Bordeaux, Gironde.
Mary Ann	United Kingdom	The ship was driven ashore at Port Talbot, Glamorgan.
William and Mary	United Kingdom	The ship caught fire in the Humber and was towed in to Hull, Yorkshire. She was on a voyage from Goole, Yorkshire to Maidstone, Kent.
William Neilson	United States	The ship was departed from Honolulu, Sandwich Islands for Manila, Spanish East Indies and Canton, China. No further trace, presumed foundered with the loss of all hands.

== 6 August ==
List of shipwrecks: 6 August 1846
Ship	State	Description
Actie	United Kingdom	The ship ran aground on the Goodwin Sands, Kent. She was on a voyage from London to Gloucester. She was refloated and put in to Margate, Kent in a leaky condition.
Derby	United Kingdom	The brig was wrecked at the mouth of the Brass River, Africa.
Eleanor Ann	United Kingdom	The schooner ran aground at Sheringham, Norfolk. She was refloated and resumed her voyage.
Iduna	Sweden	The brig was driven ashore at "Mark", Wigtownshire, United Kingdom. She was on a voyage from Christianstad to Liverpool, Lancashire, United Kingdom and was abandoned by her crew. She was refloated with assistance of HMS Pike (Royal Navy)and taken in to Loch Ryan in a waterlogged condition.
Mary and Ann	United Kingdom	The ship was driven ashore at Weybourne, Norfolk. She was on a voyage from Hull, Yorkshire to Bristol, Gloucestershire. She was refloated the next day and put in to Great Yarmouth, Norfolk in a leaky condition.
Robert and John	United Kingdom	The ship was driven ashore on "Filly Sail". She was on a voyage from Seaham, County Durham to Wisbech, Cambridgeshire. She was refloated and resumed her voyage.
Sultana	(United Kingdom of Great Britain and Ireland) Jersey	The ship was driven ashore north of Whitby, Yorkshire. She was refloated.
Vibelia	United Kingdom	The ship ran aground at Saint John, New Brunswick, British North America. She was on a voyage from Saint John to Sunderland, County Durham. She was refloated.

== 7 August ==
List of shipwrecks: 7 August 1846
Ship	State	Description
Eleanor and Ann	United Kingdom	The ship was driven ashore at Sheringham, Norfolk. She was refloated.
Flora	United Kingdom	The ship was wrecked on the coast of Patagonia, Argentina.
Foigh-a-Ballagh	United Kingdom	The ship ran aground at Saint John, New Brunswick, British North America. She was on a voyage from Saint John to Dublin. She was refloated.

== 8 August ==
List of shipwrecks: 8 August 1846
Ship	State	Description
Alster	United Kingdom	The ship ran aground on the Newcombe Sand, in the North Sea off the coast of Norfolk. She was on a voyage from Seaham, County Durham to London. She was refloated and taken in to Great Yarmouth in a leaky condition.
Atalanta	United Kingdom	The ship was driven ashore at Saint John, New Brunswick, British North America. She was on a voyage from Saint John to London.
Betsey	United Kingdom	The ship ran aground on the Scroby Sands, Norfolk. She was refloated the next day.
Falcon	United Kingdom	The paddle steamer ran aground in Clanyard Bay and was severely damaged. All on board, between 150 and 300 people, were rescued. She was on a voyage from Londonderry to Liverpool, Lancashire. Falcon was refloated the next day with assistance of HMS Asp (Royal Navy) and taken in to Ardrossan, Ayrshire. Subsequently repaired and returned to service.
Mary Kimball	United States	The ship was abandoned in the Atlantic Ocean. Her crew were rescued by the barque Valeria (Sweden). Mary Kimball was on a voyage from Cádiz, Spain to Marblehead, Massachusetts.

== 9 August ==
List of shipwrecks: 9 August 1846
Ship	State	Description
Britain	United Kingdom	The ship ran aground on the Formby Bank, in Liverpool Bay. She was on a voyage from Liverpool, Lancashire to Whitehaven, Cumberland. She was refloated and resumed her voyage.
Margaretha	Netherlands	The ship departed from Arkhangelsk, Russia for Amsterdam, North Holland. No further trace, presumed foundered with the loss of all hands.

== 11 August ==
List of shipwrecks: 11 August 1846
Ship	State	Description
Only Daughter	United Kingdom	The schooner was abandoned in the Atlantic Ocean. Two crew were rescued by Cremona (United Kingdom).
Vixen	United Kingdom	The ship ran aground at Poole, Dorset. She was refloated.
Waterwitch	(United Kingdom of Great Britain and Ireland) Van Diemen's Land	The schooner departed from Mauritius for Launceston. No further trace, presumed foundered with the loss of all hands.

== 12 August ==
List of shipwrecks: 12 August 1846
Ship	State	Description
Elizabeth	United Kingdom	The ship ran aground on the Cove Sea Skerrie Rocks, off the coast of Lothian.

== 13 August ==
List of shipwrecks: 13 August 1846
Ship	State	Description
Amelia	(United Kingdom of Great Britain and Ireland) New Zealand	The schooner's anchor chain gave way and she was driven onto rocks at Worser Bay, Wellington, becoming a total wreck. There were no deaths.
Ann	United Kingdom	The sloop foundered in the North Sea off the coast of Northumberland with the loss of all hands.
Brunswick Packet	United Kingdom	The ship was driven ashore and wrecked on Mouse Isle, Shetland Islands. Her crew were rescued. She was on a voyage from Arkhangelsk, Russia to Newcastle upon Tyne, Northumberland and Liverpool, Lancashire.
Clara	Sweden	The ship was driven ashore 25 nautical miles (46 km) south of Cape Spartel, Morocco. Her crew survived. She was on a voyage from Stockholm to Marseille, Bouches-du-Rhône, France. She subsequently broke up.
Iron Queen	United Kingdom	The steamship ship was driven ashore whilst on a voyage from Moulmein, Burma to Calcutta, India.

== 14 August ==
List of shipwrecks: 14 August 1846
Ship	State	Description
Active	United Kingdom	The ship was wrecked on Læsø, Denmark. She was on a voyage from Memel, Prussia to Leith, Lothian.
Proven	Norway	The ship sprang a leak and was beached at Kleve, Duchy of Schleswig. She was on a voyage from Ålesund to Bilbao, Spain.
Waterwitch	United Kingdom	The ship departed from Mauritius for Adelaide, South Australia. No further trace presumed foundered with the loss of all hands.

== 15 August ==
List of shipwrecks: 15 August 1846
Ship	State	Description
Auguste Etienne	France	The ship ran aground near Algeciras, Spain. She was refloated the next day and taken in to Gibraltar, where she was scuttled, capsized and was severely damaged by fire, having been on fire for three or four days previously. She was on a voyage from Marseille, Bouches-du-Rhône to Île Bourbon. Auguste Etienne was refloated on 21 August.
Port Fleetwood	United Kingdom	The ship was driven ashore and wrecked in Struys Bay.
Britannia	United Kingdom	The ship was abandoned in the Atlantic Ocean. Her crew survived. She was on a voyage from Parrsboro, Nova Scotia, British North America to a Welsh port.
Centurion	United Kingdom	The barque was driven ashore at New Romney, Kent. She was refloated on 18 August and resumed her voyage.
St. Antonio	Grand Duchy of Tuscany	The ship was in collision with Elizabeth Saunders (United Kingdom) and was consequently beached at Hastings, Sussex, United Kingdom She was on a voyage from Newcastle upon Tyne, Northumberland, United Kingdom to Genoa. She floated off in a waterlogged condition.
USS Truxtun	United States Navy	Mexican–American War: The brig of war ran aground at the mouth of the Tuxpan River and was abandoned by her crew. She was plundered by the Mexicans then set afire and burnt on 22 May by USS Princeton (United States Navy).

== 16 August ==
List of shipwrecks: 16 August 1846
Ship	State	Description
Adventure	United Kingdom	The ship was abandoned in the Atlantic Ocean. Her crew were rescued. She was on a voyage from Dublin to Lisbon, Portugal.
Mark Palmer	United Kingdom	The barque was wrecked off Western Head, Newfoundland, British North America. Her crew were rescued. She was on a voyage from Quebec City, Province of Canada, British North America to Cork.
Maine	United States	The schooner was in collision with the steamship Hibernia (United Kingdom) and sank. Five crew were rescued.

== 17 August ==
List of shipwrecks: 17 August 1846
Ship	State	Description
Ann	United Kingdom	The ship was driven ashore at Southsea Castle, Hampshire. she was on a voyage from London to Cork. She was refloated and taken in to Portsmouth.
Onderneming	Netherlands	The ship was driven ashore. She was on a voyage from Rotterdam, South Holland to Newcastle upon Tyne, Northumberland, United Kingdom. She was refloated and put back to Rotterdam.
Zephyr	United Kingdom	The ship ran aground on the Amrum Bank, in the North Sea. She was on a voyage from Hull, Yorkshire to Cuxhaven. She was refloated.

== 18 August ==
List of shipwrecks: 18 August 1846
Ship	State	Description
Ann	United Kingdom	The steamship ran aground at Southsea Castle, Hampshire. She was on a voyage from London to Cork. She was refloated and taken in to Portsmouth, Hampshire.
John Baring	United States	The ship was driven ashore at St. Ubes, Portugal. She was on a voyage from London, United Kingdom to St. Ubes.
Mary	United Kingdom	The ship was driven ashore near Donaghadee, County Antrim. She was on a voyage from the Clyde to Lisbon, Portugal. She was refloated on 20 August and towed in to Belfast, County Antrim.
Reliance	United Kingdom	The ship was driven ashore near Helsingør, Denmark. She was on a voyage from Pillau, Prussia to London. She was refloated and resumed her voyage.

== 19 August ==
List of shipwrecks: 19 August 1846
Ship	State	Description
Ann and Jane	United Kingdom	The ship was driven ashore at Aden. She was refloated.
Louisa Maria	Netherlands	The ship ran aground on the Goodwin Sands, Kent, United Kingdom. She was on a voyage from Amsterdam, North Holland to Batavia, Netherlands East Indies. She was refloated.
Retrieve	United Kingdom	The brig was run down and sunk in the North Sea 15 nautical miles (28 km) off the Spurn Lighthouse, Yorkshire by the barque Charlotte (United Kingdom) with the loss of six of her ten crew. Survivors were rescued by Charlotte. Retrieve was on a voyage from South Shields, County Durham to London.

== 20 August ==
List of shipwrecks: 20 August 1846
Ship	State	Description
Emerentine	(United Kingdom of Great Britain and Ireland) British North America	The ship was wrecked off Country Harbour, Nova Scotia. She was on a voyage from Pictou, Nova Scotia to New York, United States.
Helen	United Kingdom	The ship was wrecked on the Vanguard Sand, in the North Sea. Her crew were rescued. She was on a voyage from Liverpool, Lancashire to Dordrecht, South Holland.
Londonderry	United Kingdom	The paddle steamer ran aground at Keill, Argyllshire. All on board were rescued. She was on a voyage from Londonderry to the Clyde.
Noormahul	United Kingdom	The ship was abandoned in the Atlantic Ocean off the coast of Newfoundland, British North America. Her crew were rescued.

== 21 August ==
List of shipwrecks: 21 August 1846
Ship	State	Description
Colon	France	The ship ran aground off Paimbœuf, Loire-Inférieure. She was on a voyage from Paimbœuf to Java, Netherlands East Indies. She was refloated and put back to Paimbœuf.
Jeune Aglae	France	The ship was driven ashore near Staithes, Yorkshire, United Kingdom. She was on a voyage from Middlesbrough, Yorkshire to Nantes, Loire-Inférieure. She was refloated and taken in to Whitby, Yorkshire.
Londonderry	United Kingdom	The ship ran aground at "Keill", Argyllshire. All on board were rescued. She was on a voyage from Londonderry to Campbeltown, Argyllshire.
Louise	France	The schooner ran aground on the East Barrow Sand, in the North Sea off the coast of Essex, United Kingdom. She was on a voyage from Sunderland, County Durham, United Kingdom to Morlaix, Finistère. She was refloated with assistance from the smack Good Agreement (United Kingdom) and taken in to Wivenhoe, Essex in a leaky condition.

== 23 August ==
List of shipwrecks: 23 August 1846
Ship	State	Description
Elizabeth	United Kingdom	The ship departed from Liverpool, Lancashire for Harbour Grace, Newfoundland, British North America. No further trace, presumed foundered with the loss of all hands.
Oriental	Flag unknown	The ship was wrecked on the Santa Rosa Shoals. Her crew were resccued. She was on a voyage from Pará, Brazil to Lisbon, Portugal.

== 24 August ==
List of shipwrecks: 24 August 1846
Ship	State	Description
George Canning	United Kingdom	The brig was wrecked off Kingston, Jamaica. Her crew were rescued.
Jeune Leon	France	The ship was wrecked at Jérémie, Haiti. She was on a voyage from Jérémie to Havre de Grâce, Seine-Inférieure.
Lübeck	United Kingdom	The steamship ran aground in the Elbe near Stade, Kingdom of Hanover.

== 25 August ==
List of shipwrecks: 25 August 1846
Ship	State	Description
Anne	United Kingdom	The ship capsized in a squall with the loss of all but three of her crew. She was on a voyage from Pondicherry, India to Martinique.
Brian Boru	United Kingdom	The steamship ran aground on the Red Noses, in Liverpool Bay. Her passengers were taken off. She was on a voyage from Liverpool, Lancashire to Drogheda, County Louth. She was refloated and put back to Liverpool.
Harvey	United Kingdom	The ship ran aground on the Beauport Shoals. She was on a voyage from Newport, Monmouthshire to Quebec City, Province of Canada, British North America. She was refloated on 27 September and taken in to "Cul de Sac".

== 26 August ==
List of shipwrecks: 26 August 1846
Ship	State	Description
Rosebud	United Kingdom	The brig was wrecked on the Ox Car Rocks, off Inchcolm. She was on a voyage from Inverkeithing, Fife to Hamburg.
South Esk	United Kingdom	The schooner ran aground off Hamra, Gotland, Sweden. She was on a voyage from Riga, Russia to Dundee, Forfarshire.

== 27 August ==
List of shipwrecks: 27 August 1846
Ship	State	Description
Courier	France	The ship was driven ashore on the coast of Natal. She was on a voyage from Natal to Mauritius. She had become a wreck by 8 October.
Eben	United Kingdom	The ship ran aground on the Double Headed Shot Keys. She was refloated on 29 August and taken in to "Key Trevanier". She was on a voyage from Liverpool, Lancashire to New Orleans, Louisiana, United States.
Peru	United Kingdom	The ship departed from Bristol, Gloucestershire for Saint John's, Newfoundland, British North America. No further trace, presumed foundered with the loss of all hands.
Petrus	United Kingdom	The ship ran aground and capsized at Grimsby, Lincolnshire. she was on a voyage from Sundsvall, Sweden to Grimsby.
San Domingos Eneas	Portugal	The coal hulk was destroyed by fire at Lisbon.

== 28 August ==
List of shipwrecks: 28 August 1846
Ship	State	Description
Eridan	French Navy	The paddle aviso struck a rock and sank in the Oyapock.
Jeune Leon	France	The ship was lost at Jérémie, Haiti.
Louise	Netherlands	The ship was driven ashore and damaged near "Besveke", Netherlands East Indies.
Sportsman	United Kingdom	The ship was driven ashore near the Morup Beacon, Sweden. She was on a voyage from Saint Petersburg, Russia to Guernsey, Channel Islands.
Warner	United Kingdom	The ship ran aground at Staxigoe, Caithness. She was on a voyage from Quebec City, Province of Canada, British North America to the River Spey. She was refloated.

== 29 August ==
List of shipwrecks: 29 August 1846
Ship	State	Description
Clarion	Hawaii	The coasting schooner Clarion, under Captain Pali, went ashore and was wrecked about 3/4 mile south of Keaukou in the Hawaiian Islands. The captain and his watch were reported to be asleep below at the time. Her crew made it ashore without loss of life.
Phya	United Kingdom	The ship was driven ashore on the north coast of Hogland, Russia. She was on a voyage from Sunderland, County Durham to Saint Petersburg, Russia. She was refloated.
HMS Rattler	Royal Navy	The steam sloop ran aground at Lisbon, Portugal. She was refloated.
Silksworth	United Kingdom	The ship departed from Dublin for a port in British North America. No further trace, presumed foundered with the loss of all hands.

== 30 August ==
List of shipwrecks: 30 August 1846
Ship	State	Description
Dundalk	United Kingdom	The paddle steamer ran ashore in Bootle Bay. She was on a voyage from Dundalk, County Louth to Liverpool, Lancashire. She was refloated.
Hebe	United Kingdom	The ship ran aground on the Manicougan Shoal. Her passengers were taken off. Sh was on a voyage from Liverpool, Lancashire to Quebec City, Province of Canada, British North America.

== Unknown date ==
List of shipwrecks: Unknown date in August 1846
Ship	State	Description
Alexandre	France	The chasse-marée was abandoned in the North Sea before 26 August.
Ariel	(United Kingdom of Great Britain and Ireland) New South Wales	The ship ran aground and was wrecked at Port Albert before 14 August. Her crew were rescued.
Blandford	United Kingdom	The ship was lost off Harbour Grace, Newfoundland, British North America.
Commodore Napier	United Kingdom	The ship was driven ashore on Skagen, Denmark. She was on a voyage from St Davids, Pembrokeshire to Kronstadt, Russia. She was refloated and completed her voyage, arriving at Kronstadt on 2 September.
Eden	United Kingdom	The ship ran aground on the Double Headed Shot Keys. She was on a voyage from Liverpool, Lancashire to New Orleans, Louisiana, United States. She was refloated after 29 August and taken in to Key West, Florida, United States.
Empire	United Kingdom	The ship was wrecked on the Carysfort Reef before 9 August.
Iron Queen	United Kingdom	The ship ran aground on the Rabbit and Coney before 20 August. She was on a voyage from Penang, Malaya to Singapore. She was refloated and taken in to Singapore.
Mary Campbell	United Kingdom	The ship was driven ashore at Sandy Cove, Nova Scotia, British North America between 7 and 12 August. She was on a voyage from Saint John, New Brunswick, British North America to Dublin. She was refloated and put back to Saint John in a leaky condition.
Mayflower	(United Kingdom of Great Britain and Ireland) British North America	The ship was driven ashore on Tangier Island, Virginia, United States. She was refloated.
Oriental	United Kingdom	The ship was lost near "Juggernaut" before 3 August. She was on a voyage from Calcutta, India to London.
Sarah Elizabeth	(United Kingdom of Great Britain and Ireland) British North America	The ship departed from Ragged Island, Bahamas for Alexandria, Egypt in late August. No further trace, presumed foundered with the loss of all hands.
Stephen Wright	United Kingdom	The brig was wrecked on the Cattaros Rocks, in the River Plate at Flores, Buenos Aires, Argentina before 21 August with the loss of six of the sixteen people on board.
Woodland Castle	United Kingdom	The brig was abandoned in the Atlantic Ocean before 7 August. Her crew were rescued by Briton (United Kingdom).
