= Madagascar (disambiguation) =

Madagascar is an island country located off the eastern coast of Africa.

Madagascar may also refer to:

== Places ==
- Geography of Madagascar
- Madagascar Plate

== Entertainment ==
- Madagascar (1994 film), a Cuban film by Fernando Pérez
- Madagascar (franchise), a film franchise by DreamWorks Animation
  - Madagascar (2005 film), an American animated comedy film
  - Madagascar: Escape 2 Africa, the 2008 sequel to the 2005 film
  - Madagascar (soundtrack), a soundtrack to the 2005 film
  - Madagascar (video game), a video game based on the 2005 film
  - Madagascar: Escape 2 Africa (video game), a video game based on the film
- Madagascar (TV series), a 2011 documentary series narrated by David Attenborough
- "Madagascar" (song), a 2008 song by Guns N' Roses from their album Chinese Democracy
- "Madagascar", a song by Art of Trance

== Ships ==
- List of ships named Madagascar
- HMS Madagascar, two vessels of the British Royal Navy

== Other uses ==
- Madagascar (software), a software package for multidimensional data analysis

== See also ==
- Madagascar national football team
- Madagascar national rugby union team
- Madagascar Davis Cup team
- Madagascar Fed Cup team
- Madagascar Plan
- Madagascar women's national basketball team
- Malagasy (disambiguation)
