= List of shipwrecks in April 1850 =

The list of shipwrecks in April 1850 includes ships sunk, foundered, wrecked, grounded, or otherwise lost during April 1850.

== 1 April ==
List of shipwrecks: 1 April 1850
Ship	State	Description
Busy	United Kingdom	The ship struck a rock and was beached at Rutland, County Donegal. She was on a voyage from Liverpool, Lancashire to Sligo.
Conrad	United Kingdom	The ship ran aground at Mazatlan, Cuba. She was on a voyage from Mazatlan to Liverpool. She was refloated and taken in to Mazatlan for repairs.
Eliza	United Kingdom	The ship was driven ashore and capsized in South Bay, County Wexford. She was on a voyage from Liverpool to Youghal, County Cork.
Elliots	United Kingdom	The brig foundered in the Dogger Bank. Her crew were rescued by the schooner Mercurius (Hamburg). Elliots was on a voyage from Newcastle upon Tyne, Northumberland to Hamburg.
Esther	France	The schooner sank at Sunderland, County Durham, United Kingdom.
Herrings	United Kingdom	The ship was driven ashore at Durness, Sutherland. Her crew were rescued. She was on a voyage from Quebec City, Province of Canada, British North America to South Shields, County Durham. She subsequently became a wreck.
John R. Skiddy	United Kingdom	The ship was driven ashore and wrecked at Glascarrig Point, County Wexford. Her passengers and some of her crew were landed, the rest remaining on board. She was on a voyage from Liverpool to New York, United States. Those remaining on board were later rescued.
Juffrow Henriette	Bremen	The ship was abandoned in the North Sea. Her crew were rescued. She was on a voyage from Cardiff, Glamorgan, United Kingdom to Bremerhaven.
L'Hiver	France	The full-rigged ship was driven ashore on the Isle of Arran, Inner Hebrides, United Kingdom. She was on a voyage from Saint-Malo, Ille-et-Vilaine to Glasgow, Renfrewshire, United Kingdom.
Lord Brougham	United Kingdom	The ship was driven ashore on Eday, Orkney Islands. She was refloated on 10 April and taken in to Stromness for repairs.
Otto	United Kingdom	The ship was driven ashore near Wexford. She was on a voyage from Dunkirk, Nord, France to Liverpool, Lancashire.
Pursuit	United Kingdom	The ship was driven ashore at Grimsby, Lincolnshire. She was on a voyage from Dordrecht, South Holland, Netherlands to Grimsby. She was refloated on 12 April and taken in to Grimsby.
Susan	United Kingdom	The ship ran aground and sank off Isleornsay, Isle of Skye, Outer Hebrides. She was on a voyage from Liverpool to Königsberg, Prussia.
Transit	(United Kingdom of Great Britain and Ireland) British North America	The ship was wrecked on Cape Sable Island, Nova Scotia. She was on a voyage from Saint John's, Newfoundland to Boston, Massachusetts, United States.

== 2 April ==
List of shipwrecks: April 1850
Ship	State	Description
Commerce	United Kingdom	The ship was abandoned in the Atlantic Ocean. Her crew were rescued. She was on a voyage from Bonny, Africa to Liverpool, Lancashire. Commerce came ashore in the Blasket Islands, County Kerry on 4 April and was wrecked.
Eliza Taylor	United Kingdom	The sloop struck the Hore Rock and sank off Ballygeary, County Wexford. Her crew survived. She was on a voyage from Liverpool to Youghal, County Cork.
Ida	Prussia	The ship was driven ashore at Nidingen, Denmark. Her crew were rescued. She was on a voyage from Swinemünde or Stettin to Liverpool.
Isabella	United Kingdom	The schooner was destroyed by fire at Stromness, Orkney Islands. She was on a voyage from Sunderland, County Durham to Stromness.
Minna	United Kingdom	The ship ran aground on the Gunfleet Sand, in the North Sea off the coast of Essex. She was on a voyage from Hamburg to London. She was refloated and taken in to Harwich, Essex in a leaky condition.

== 3 April ==
List of shipwrecks: 3 April 1850
Ship	State	Description
Isabella	United Kingdom	The brig was driven ashore and wrecked near the Lizard Lighthouse, Cornwall. Her twelve crew survived. She was on a voyage from Odesa to Falmouth, Cornwall.
James Trail	United Kingdom	The ship ran aground on the Herd Sand, in the North Sea off the coast of County Durham. She was refloated and put back to South Shields, County Durham.
Wilson	United Kingdom	The brig departed from Matanzas, Cuba for Montreal, Province of Canada, British North America. She subsequently foundered with the loss of all hands.

== 4 April ==
List of shipwrecks: 4 April 1850
Ship	State	Description
Fortitude	United Kingdom	The schooner was wrecked on the Burbo Bank, in Liverpool Bay. She was on a voyage from Exeter, Devon to Liverpool, Lancashire.
Gebroeders	Netherlands	The brig foundered in the Atlantic Ocean (50°30′N 8°00′W). Her crew were rescued by the brig Malherbe (France). Gebroeders was on a voyage from the Nickerie River, Suriname to Amsterdam, North Holland.
Indian	(United Kingdom of Great Britain and Ireland) Jersey	The East Indiaman was wrecked on St. Brandon's Reef, off Mauritius with the loss of six of the 21 people on board. Nine others were initially reported missing, but were later thought to have survived. She was on a voyage from London to Bombay, India.
Isabella	United Kingdom	The ship ran aground on the Lights Shoal, off the Manacles. Her twelve crew were rescued. She broke up the next day. Isabella was on a voyage from Odesa to South Shields, County Durham.
James	United Kingdom	The ship capsized in the North Sea with the loss of a crew member. Survivors were rescued the next day by the schooner Maria (France). James was on a voyage from Hartlepool, County Durham to Königsberg, Prussia.
Marmion	United Kingdom	The ship foundered off the coast of County Antrim.
Ranger	United Kingdom	The ship ran aground in Dunmanus Bay, County Cork. Her crew were rescued. She was on a voyage from Malta to Queenstown, County Cork.
Venus	United Kingdom	The ship was driven ashore in Deadman Bay.

== 5 April ==
List of shipwrecks: 5 April 1850
Ship	State	Description
Albion	United Kingdom	The barque was wrecked on rocks west of Tarifa, Spain. Her crew were rescued by Australasian (United Kingdom). Albion was on a voyage from Gibraltar to Cádiz, Spain.
Allison	United Kingdom	The ship ran aground on the Kratzsand, in the North Sea. She was on a voyage from Hartlepool, County Durham to Hamburg. She was refloated on 9 April and taken in to the Elbe.
Eliza Taylor	United Kingdom	The ship was wrecked in South Bay. She was on a voyage from Liverpool, Lancashire to Youghal, County Cork.
John and Mary	United Kingdom	The ship struck the pier and sank at Whitby, Yorkshire.

== 6 April ==
List of shipwrecks: 6 April 1850
Ship	State	Description
Albion	United Kingdom	The barque struck the Thisbery Rock and sank. Her crew were rescued by Australian (United Kingdom). Albion was on a voyage from Gibraltar to Cádiz, Spain.
Brazilian	United Kingdom	The brig was wrecked on Saint Domingo with the loss of all but three of her crew. She was on a voyage from Porto Caballo, Venezuela to New York, United States.
Pioneer	United Kingdom	The ship ran aground on the Scroby Sands, Norfolk. She was on a voyage from South Shields, County Durham to Rotterdam, South Holland, Netherlands. She was refloated and resumed her voyage.
Port of Spain	(United Kingdom of Great Britain and Ireland) British North America	The ship was driven ashore near the Assateague Lighthouse, Virginia, United States. She was on a voyage from Trinidad to Philadelphia, Pennsylvania, United States.

== 7 April ==
List of shipwrecks: 7 April 1850
Ship	State	Description
Bravo	United Kingdom	The brig was driven ashore and wrecked at Bamburgh Castle, Northumberland. All eleven people on board were rescued by a coble. She was on a voyage from Newcastle upon Tyne, Northumberland to London.
Emilie	Stettin	The ship ran aground off Saltholm, Denmark. She was on a voyage from Stettin to Liverpool, Lancashire, United Kingdom. She was refloated and put in to Copenhagen, Denmark for repairs.

== 8 April ==
List of shipwrecks: 8 April 1850
Ship	State	Description
Chusan	United Kingdom	The ship departed from Newport, Monmouthshire for Norfolk, Virginia, United States. No further trace, presumed foundered with the loss of all hands.
James Munro	United Kingdom	The ship was wrecked at Cape Pillar, Van Diemen's Land. She was on a voyage from Alta California to Van Diemen's Land.
Velocity	(United Kingdom of Great Britain and Ireland) British North America	The ship was destroyed by fire off Cape Hatteras, North Carolina, United States. Her crew were rescued. She was on a voyage from Wilmington, North Carolina to Prince Edward Island.

== 9 April ==
List of shipwrecks: 9 April 1850
Ship	State	Description
Efion	United Kingdom	The ship ran aground and capsized at Caernarfon. Her crew were rescued. She was on a voyage from Pembrey, Carmarthenshire to Caernarfon.
Harlequin	United Kingdom	The ship ran aground off Carlisle Point, County Cork. She was on a voyage from Barbados to Limerick. She was refloated the next day and towed in to Cork.
James	United Kingdom	The derelict schooner was driven ashore and wrecked in the Shetland Islands.
Mr. Cornelius Haga	Netherlands	The ship struck a sunken rock and sank in the Gaspar Strait. Her crew were rescued. She was on a voyage from Whampoa, China to Amsterdam, North Holland.
Portly	United Kingdom	The barque foundered in the Mediterranean Sea (35°50′N 20°21′E). Her crew were rescued. She was on a voyage from Alexandria, Egypt Eyalet to a British port.
Speculation	United Kingdom	The ship was driven ashore near Skerries, County Dublin.
Speculator	United Kingdom	The ship was wrecked on the Harry Furlong Rock, off the coast of Anglesey. Her crew were rescued. She was on a voyage from Wicklow to Runcorn, Cheshire.

== 10 April ==
List of shipwrecks: 10 April 1850
Ship	State	Description
Armonia	United Kingdom	The ship was lost near Mazara del Vallo, Sicily. Her crew were rescued. She was on a voyage from Galaţi, Ottoman Empire to Cork.
Collier	United Kingdom	The steamship was driven through London Bridge and was severely damaged. She was on a voyage from London to Guernsey and Jersey, Channel Islands.
Pallas	Prussia	The barque was abandoned in the Atlantic Ocean (40°56′N 35°13′W). Her crew were rescued by the brig Henriette (Bremen). Pallas was on a voyage from Cardiff, Glamorgan, United Kingdom to New York, United States.
Washington	United Kingdom	The barque was abandoned in the Atlantic Ocean off the Isles of Scilly. Her crew were rescued by the mackerel boat Eugénie (France), which towed Washington into St, Mary's, Isles of Scilly the next day. Washington was on a voyage from Mauritius to London.

== 11 April ==
List of shipwrecks: 11 April 1850
Ship	State	Description
Enterprise	United Kingdom	The ship was driven ashore and wrecked at "Kjiel", Denmark. Her crew were rescued.
Essai	France	The ship was driven ashore at Nantucket, Massachusetts, United States. She was on a voyage from La Rochelle, Charente-Maritime to Boston, Massachusetts. She was later refloated and towed in to Boston.
Jeune Aglae	France	The ship ran aground on the Haisborough Sands, in the North Sea off the coast of Norfolk, United Kingdom. She was on a voyage from Hamburg to Dunkirk, Nord. She was refloated and put in to Great Yarmouth, Norfolk in a leaky condition.
William and Henry	United Kingdom	The ship ran aground on the Ness of Queys. She was on a voyage from Liverpool, Lancashire to Hartlepool, County Durham. She was refloated on 15 April and put in to Longhope, Orkney Islands.
Zoe	(United Kingdom of Great Britain and Ireland) Saint Vincent	The ship was wrecked on the Weather Reef.

== 12 April ==
List of shipwrecks: April 1850
Ship	State	Description
Alexander	Lübeck	The brig capsized west of Heligoland with the loss of all hands. She was on a voyage from Cuxhaven to Lübeck.
Ganges	United Kingdom	The brig foundered in the Atlantic Ocean. Her ten crew were rescued by the barque Onderneming (Netherlands). Ganges was on a voyage from Sunderland, County Durham to New York.
Grantham	United Kingdom	The ship struck a sunken rock and was damaged. She put in to Gothenburg, Sweden in a leaky condition. She was on a voyage from Swinemünde, Prussia to Hartlepool, County Durham.

== 13 April ==
List of shipwrecks: 13 April 1850
Ship	State	Description
Border Chieftain	United Kingdom	The ship was driven ashore on the Île-d'Aix, Charente-Maritime, France. She was on a voyage from Sunderland, County Durham to the Charente. She was refloated the next day and taken in to the Charente.
Crown	United Kingdom	The schooner was wrecked at West Quoddy, Nova Scotia, British North America with the loss of all hands.
Nelson	United Kingdom	The ship foundered in the North Sea off the coast of Aberdeenshire with the loss of one of her five crew.
Planet	United Kingdom	The ship ran aground on the Goodwin Sands, Kent. She was on a voyage from Hamburg to Plymouth, Devon. She was refloated.
Ranger	United Kingdom	The ship was wrecked at Anamaboe, Gold Coast. Her crew were rescued.

== 14 April ==
List of shipwrecks: 14 April 1850
Ship	State	Description
Elizabeth	United Kingdom	The ship departed from Rotterdam, South Holland, Netherlands for Bristol, Gloucestershire. No further trace, presumed foundered with the loss of all hands.
Harbinger	United Kingdom	The ship sprang a leak and was abandoned north of Vigo, Spain. Her six crew survived. She was on a voyage from Pernambuco, Brazil to Falmouth, Cornwall.
Lion	United Kingdom	The schooner was wrecked on the Galibia Shoals, off the coast of the Beylik of Tunis. Her crew were rescued. She was on a voyage from Agrigento, Sicily to Hamburg.
Patriot	(United Kingdom of Great Britain and Ireland) British North America	The schooner was wrecked at Métis-sur-Mer, Province of Canada. Her crew were rescued. She was on a voyage from Newfoundland to Quebec City, Province of Canada.

== 15 April ==
List of shipwrecks: 15 April 1850
Ship	State	Description
Amphitrite	United Kingdom	The barque was in collision with Tanjore (United Kingdom) and was abandoned in the Atlantic Ocean. Her crew were rescued by Tanjore. Amphitrite was on a voyage from London to Saint Lucia. She was discovered on 19 April by the steamship Levantine (United Kingdom) which put three crew aboard. She was taken in to Belém, Portugal.
Ann McKay	United Kingdom	The ship struck the pier and sank at Whitby, Yorkshire.
Cushla Macree	United Kingdom	The ship, which had capsized on 30 March, was abandoned in the Atlantic Ocean with the loss of one of her ten crew. Her surviving crew and 160 passengers were rescued by Infanta ( (United Kingdom of Great Britain and Ireland) British North America). Cushla Macree was on a voyage from Galway to New York, United States.
Elizabeth	United Kingdom	The ship struck the pier and was wrecked at Seaham, County Durham. Her crew were rescued.
Leon	United Kingdom	The schooner was wrecked at Galibia, Beylik of Tunis. She was on a voyage from Agrigento, Sicily to Hamburg.
Maria and Fanny	United Kingdom	The ship ran aground on the Goodwin Sands, Kent. She was on a voyage from Amsterdam, North Holland, Netherlands to Genoa, Kingdom of Sardinia. She was refloated and put in to Ramsgate, Kent in a leaky condition.
Mary Ann	United Kingdom	The ship ran aground on the Sheringham Shoal, in the North Sea off the coast of Norfolk. She was on a voyage from Seaham to Le Tréport, Seine-Inférieure, France. She was refloated and taken in to Great Yarmouth, Norfolk in a leaky condition.
Poliseni	Ottoman Empire	The ship was wrecked on the coast of Caramania.

== 16 April ==
List of shipwrecks: 16 April 1850
Ship	State	Description
Leonidas	France	The ship was in collision with an American vessel and was abandoned in the English Channel off Dungeness, Kent. Her crew were rescued. She was on a voyage from Stettin to Havre de Grâce, Seine-Inférieure. Leonidas was taken in to Ramsgate, Kent on 18 April in a derelict condition.
Scandinavian	Sweden	The barque was driven ashore in the Dardanelles. She was on a voyage from Hartlepool, County Durham, United Kingdom to Odesa.
Troubador	Bremen	The ship ran aground on the Lunerplatte, in the North Sea. She was on a voyage from Middlesbrough, Yorkshire, United Kingdom to Bremen. She was refloated and taken in to Bremen.

== 17 April ==
List of shipwrecks: 17 April 1850
Ship	State	Description
Frithiof	Russia	The full-rigged ship ran aground at Galatario Point, Ottoman Empire. She was on a voyage from Hartlepool, County Durham, United Kingdom to Constantinople, Ottoman Empire.
Lady Denison	(United Kingdom of Great Britain and Ireland) South Australia	The ship departed from Port Adelaide for Hobart, Van Diemen's Land. No further trace, presumed foundered with the loss of all 42 people on board.
Prospect	United Kingdom	The tug foundered in the Bristol Channel. She was on a voyage from Cardiff, Glamorgan to Bristol, Gloucestershire. She was refloated on 18 April.
Providenza	Spain	The ship was wrecked at Marseille, Bouches-du-Rhône, France. She was on a voyage from Barcelona to Marseille.

== 18 April ==
List of shipwrecks: 18 April 1850
Ship	State	Description
Amicitiæ	United Kingdom	The brig ran aground at Barber's Point, in the Dardanelles. She was refloated and resumed her voyage.
Arab	United Kingdom	The ship was driven ashore at Ness Point, Suffolk. She was on a voyage from London to Hartlepool, County Durham. She was refloated the next day and resumed her voyage.
British Queen	United Kingdom	The ship struck The Skerries, off Anglesey and was damaged. She was on a voyage from Liverpool, Lancashire to Galaţi, Ottoman Empire. She consequently put in to Milford Haven, Pembrokeshire for repairs, being leaky.
Catherine	United States	The full-rigged ship was driven ashore at New Romney, Kent, United Kingdom. She was on a voyage from Amsterdam, North Holland, Netherlands to New York. She was refloated the next day and resumed her voyage.
Frederikke	Prussia	The ship was driven ashore at the Agger Canal, Denmark. she was on a voyage from Lisbon, Portugal to Memel. She was refloated on 2 May.
Harmony	United Kingdom	The ship sprang a leak and was beached at Torretta, Sicily. Her crew were rescued. She was on a voyage from Galaţi, Ottoman Empire to Cork or Falmouth, Cornwall. She had become a wreck by 30 April.
Radians	United Kingdom	The ship ran aground in the Dardanelles. She was refloated the next day and resumed her voyage.

== 19 April ==
List of shipwrecks: 19 April 1850
Ship	State	Description
Cervantes	United Kingdom	The ship ran aground on the Holm Sand, in the North Sea off the coast of Suffolk. She was on a voyage from South Shields, County Durham to London. She was refloated the next day and taken in to Lowestoft, Suffolk in a leaky condition.
Deolinda	(United Kingdom of Great Britain and Ireland) Guernsey	The ship ran aground on the Newcombe Sand, in the North Sea off the coast of Suffolk. She was refloated and resumed her voyage.
Elizabeth	(United Kingdom of Great Britain and Ireland) British North America	The ship was abandoned in the Atlantic Ocean. Her crew were rescued by Sunny Eye (United Kingdom). Elizabeth was on a voyage from Saint Stephen, New Brunswick to Montevideo, Uruguay. She was still afloat on 2 July.
Midge	United Kingdom	The schooner ran aground on the Whitby Rock. She was refloated and resumed her voyage.
Mungo Park	United Kingdom	The barque foundered in the North Sea 12 nautical miles (22 km) off the Farne Islands, Northumberland. Her crew were rescued. She was on a voyage from Newcastle upon Tyne, Northumberland to Copenhagen, Denmark.
Themis	France	The barque ran aground on the Red Bank, off the coast of the Gambia Colony and Protectorate. She broke up the next day.

== 20 April ==
List of shipwrecks: 20 April 1850
Ship	State	Description
Anna	France	The ship ran aground on the Coserow Reef, in the Baltic Sea off the coast of Prussia.
Constituzione	Kingdom of Sardinia	The ship was driven ashore near Marbella, Spain. She was on a voyage from Genoa to Saint Thomas, Virgin Islands. She was refloated with assistance from HMS Janus (Royal Navy) and taken in to Gibraltar.
Iris	Duchy of Holstein	The ship ran aground at Memel, Prussia. She was on a voyage from Memel to Flensburg. She was refloated and towed in to Memel.
Titania	Prussia	The ship ran aground on the Dragoe Reef, in the Baltic Sea. She was on a voyage from Rügenwalde to Christiania, Norway. She was refloated and taken in to Copenhagen, Denmark.

== 21 April ==
List of shipwrecks: 21 April 1850
Ship	State	Description
Intrepide	France	The ship foundered off "Point d'Areachon". Her crew were rescued. She was on a voyage from Bayonne, Basses-Pyrénées to Rouen, Seine-Inférieure.
Philadelphia	United Kingdom	The ship ran aground on the Boulmer Rocks, Northumberland and wa severely damaged. She was on a voyage from the River Tyne to Perth.
Reine de Hollande	Netherlands	The ship sank in the Atlantic Ocean (36°00′N 20°30′W). A message in a bottle to that effect washed up at Audierne, Finistère, France in late March 1851.

== 22 April ==
List of shipwrecks: 22 April 1850
Ship	State	Description
Armistead	United Kingdom	The brig ran aground on the Herd Sand, in the North Sea off the coast of County Durham. Her crew were rescued by the North Shields Lifeboat. She was on a voyage from Aberdeen to South Shields, County Durham. Armistead was refloated and taken in to South Shields.
Hebe	United Kingdom	The ship sprang a leak and was beached at Savanilla, Mexico. Her crew were rescued. She was on a voyage from Savanilla to London.

== 23 April ==
List of shipwrecks: 23 April 1850
Ship	State	Description
Busy	United Kingdom	The sloop ran aground at Coleraine, County Antrim. She was on a voyage from Liverpool, Lancashire to Coleraine.
Hebe	United Kingdom	The ship was wrecked on the coast of the Republic of New Granada. Her crew were rescued.
Jenny	United Kingdom	The ship ran aground on the Pearl Rock, off the coast of Spain. She was on a voyage from Torrevieja, Spain to New York, United States.
Jeune Seraphine	France	The ship struck a sunken wreck off the Pasquettes and foundered. She was on a voyage from Rouen, Seine-Inférieure to Bordeaux, Gironde.
Julmer	Kingdom of Hanover	The ship sprang a leak and was beached in the Nieuw Diep. She was on a voyage from Emden to Irvine, Ayrshire, United Kingdom.
Ocean	United Kingdom	The ship foundered in the Atlantic Ocean. Her crew were rescued by Wolfville (United States). Ocean was on a voyage from Glasgow, Renfrewshire to Boston, Massachusetts, United States.
Rainbow	United Kingdom	The brig was abandoned in the Atlantic Ocean (45°00′N 33°30′W). Her crew were rescued by the barque Marion (United Kingdom). She foundered the next day.
Snowden	United Kingdom	The ship was abandoned in the Mediterranean Sea 100 nautical miles (190 km) off Catania, Sicily. Her crew were rescued and she then foundered.

== 24 April ==
List of shipwrecks: 24 April 1850
Ship	State	Description
Ellen	United Kingdom	The ship ran aground at Viana do Castelo, Portugal. She was on a voyage from Viana do Castelano to Dungarvan, County Waterford. She was refloated and put back to Viana do Castelo in a leaky condition.
Gazelle	Sweden	The schooner was in collision with a British schooner and foundered in the Atlantic Ocean. Her eight crew were rescued by the brig Rosina (United Kingdom). Gazelle was on a voyage from Hull, Yorkshire, United Kingdom to Havana, Cuba.
Jewess	United Kingdom	The ship was wrecked on the Cavalle Blanco Reef, Virgin Islands. She was on a voyage from Málaga, Spain to New Orleans, Louisiana.
Seraphine	United Kingdom	The ship was abandoned in the Atlantic Ocean (53°17′N 31°16′W). All on board were rescued by Alderado, Garland and Woodman (all United Kingdom). Seraphine was on a voyage from Newry, County Antrim to New York, United States.

== 25 April ==
List of shipwrecks: 25 June 1850
Ship	State	Description
Ashley	United Kingdom	The ship was driven ashore and damaged east of Nairn. She was on a voyage from Newcastle upon Tyne, Northumberland to New York, United States.
Charles Dean	United Kingdom	The sailing barge sank off Walton-on-the-Naze, Essex.
Lily	United Kingdom	The ship was driven ashore at Ingoldmells, Lincolnshire. She was on a voyage from Seville, Spain to Grimsby, Lincolnshire of Hull, Yorkshire.
Louise	United Kingdom	The ship was driven ashore at Tenedos, Ottoman Empire. She was on a voyage from Liverpool, Lancashire to Constantinople, Ottoman Empire. She was refloated on 5 May and taken in to Tenedos.
Pageant	United Kingdom	The brig struck a sunken rock and was damaged off Taboguilla Island, Panama.
Susanna	United Kingdom	The ship was driven ashore near the mouth of the Benito River and was abandoned by her crew.

== 26 April ==
List of shipwrecks: 26 April 1850
Ship	State	Description
Active	United Kingdom	The ship was driven ashore and wrecked at Deal, Kent. Her crew were rescued.
Columbus	United Kingdom	The ship ran aground at Egremont, Lancashire. She was on a voyage from New York, United States to Liverpool, Lancashire.
Frithiof	Flag unknown	The ship ran aground near Gallipoli, Ottoman Empire. She was on a voyage from Hartlepool, County Durham, United Kingdom to Constantinople, Ottoman Empire. She was refloated.
Lady Maxwell	United Kingdom	The ship foundered in the Irish Sea 10 nautical miles (19 km) off Teeling Head, County Donegal. Her crew were rescued. She was on a voyage from Liverpool, Lancashire to Belmullet, County Mayo.
Majestic	United Kingdom	The ship ran aground near Gallipoli. She was on a voyage from Liverpool to Constantinople. She was refloated.
Nancy and Catherine	United Kingdom	The ship was driven ashore on Sanda Island, Argyllshire. She was on a voyage from Greenock, Renfrewshire to Londonderry.
Vision	United Kingdom	The ship ran aground at Gallipoli. She was on a voyage from Troon, Ayrshire to Constantinople. She was refloated.

== 27 April ==
List of shipwrecks: 27 April 1850
Ship	State	Description
Esperance	Spain	The ship was wrecked near Heneagua, Bahamas. Her crew were rescued. She was on a voyage from St. Jago de Cuba, Cuba to Barcelona.
Fanny	Stettin	The ship was abandoned in the Atlantic Ocean. Her crew were rescued by Johanna Frederika (Flag unknown). Fanny was on a voyage from Newcastle upon Tyne, Northumberland, United Kingdom to New York, United States.

== 28 April ==
List of shipwrecks: 28 April 1850
Ship	State	Description
Anthony Wayne	United States	The paddle steamer suffered a boiler explosion and sank in Lake Erie with the loss of about 50 to 70 lives.
Fairy	(United Kingdom of Great Britain and Ireland) Jersey	The smack was blown out to sea from São Miguel Island, Azores. No further trace.
Hamoody	India	The ship was driven ashore at Black Point, near Saugor.

== 29 April ==
List of shipwrecks: 29 April 1850
Ship	State	Description
Euphrates	United Kingdom	The ship was wrecked on Grand Manan, Nova Scotia, British North America with the loss of a crew member. She was on a voyage from Saint John, New Brunswick, British North America to Puerto Rico.
Oriental	United Kingdom	The ship was sunk by ice in the Atlantic Ocean with the loss of all on board, between 80 and 100 people. She was on a voyage from Londonderry to Quebec City, Province of Canada, British North America.
Theckla	Hamburg	The ship was driven ashore near "Ideren", Norway. She was on a voyage from Hamburg to a Norwegian port.

== 30 April ==
List of shipwrecks: 30 April 1850
Ship	State	Description
Ann	United Kingdom	The ship ran aground on the Middle Sand, in the River Tees and was severely damaged. She was on a voyage from Fowey, Cornwall to Middlesbrough, Yorkshire. She was refloated the next day and taken in to Middlesbrough.
Dorothy	United Kingdom	The ship ran aground on the Mouse Sand, in the North Sea off the coast of Essex.

== Unknown date ==
List of shipwrecks: Unknown date in April 1850
Ship	State	Description
Edmund Castle	United Kingdom	The ship foundered before 21 April. She was on a voyage from South Shields, County Durham to Galway and British North America.
Favourite	United Kingdom	The whaler was wrecked on Navigation Island before 16 April. Her crew were rescued.
Flora	Stettin	The ship was wrecked on the coast of Norway. Her crew were rescued. She was on a voyage from Maranhão, Brazil to Stettin.
Galway Castle	United Kingdom	The ship was presumed to have foundered before 21 April. She was on a voyage from South Shields, County Durham to Galway and North America.
Grecian	United Kingdom	The barque was wrecked on The Triangles, off Belize City, British Honduras before 10 April. She was on a voyage from Belize City to London.
John Hill	United Kingdom	The brig was abandoned in the Atlantic Ocean before 27 April.
Kate and Jane	United Kingdom	The ship ran aground in the "Kaltoseheeren", off the coast of Sweden before 11 April. She was refloated.
Nanine	France	The ship ran aground and was damaged at the mouth of the Somme in late April.
Specie	United States	The fishing schooner left Gloucester, Massachusetts for Georges Bank. Debris from the fishing schooner was found on the Georges Bank in mid April. Lost with all 7 crewmen.
Susannah	United Kingdom	The ship capsized 6 nautical miles (11 km) off Straithie Head, Scotland on or before 7 April.
Victoria	United Kingdom	The schooner was lost on the coast of Newfoundland, British North America.
Walter Scott	United States	The fishing schooner was lost on the Georges Bank with all 8 hands.
