= List of shipwrecks in September 1841 =

The list of shipwrecks in September 1841 includes ships sunk, foundered, wrecked, grounded, or otherwise lost during September 1841.

== 1 September ==
List of shipwrecks: 1 September 1841
Ship	State	Description
Experience	United Kingdom	The schooner was driven ashore and wrecked at Ayr.
Theresa	United Kingdom	The ship foundered in the English Channel off Dungeness, Kent. Her crew were rescued. She was on a voyage from London to Rio de Janeiro, Brazil.
Quiz	United Kingdom	The ship was driven ashore at Crea Nero Point, United States of the Ionian Islands. She was on a voyage from Malta to Zante, United States of the Ionian Islands. Quiz was refloated and taken into Zante.

== 2 September ==
List of shipwrecks: 2 September 1841
Ship	State	Description
Emperor	United Kingdom	The brig was wrecked on the Pollock Rip Shoal, off the coast of Massachusetts, United States. She was on a voyage from Windsor, Province of Canada, British North America to New York, United States.
Iris	United Kingdom	The ship struck the Longships, off the coast of Cornwall and was abandoned by her crew. She was on a voyage from Dartmouth, Devon to Newcastle upon Tyne, Northumberland. Iris subsequently came ashore in Whitesand Bay and was wrecked.

== 3 September ==
List of shipwrecks: 3 September 1841
Ship	State	Description
Ann and Eliza	(United Kingdom of Great Britain and Ireland) Jersey	The ship ran aground at Padstow, Cornwall and was damaged. She was on a voyage from Padstow to Jersey. Ann and Eliza was later refloated.
David	(United Kingdom of Great Britain and Ireland) New Zealand	The whaling barque ran aground in Palliser Bay and was driven on shore with the loss of three of her 29 crew.
Dorothy	United Kingdom	The steam tug sprang a leak and sank at the mouth of the Ythan.
Paul Pry	(United Kingdom of Great Britain and Ireland) New South Wales	The ship capsized and sank 6 nautical miles (11 km) south west of Cape Schanck with the loss of one of the fourteen people on board.

== 4 September ==
List of shipwrecks: 4 September 1841
Ship	State	Description
Ann	United Kingdom	The ship was driven ashore at Limerick. She was on a voyage from Miramichi, New Brunswick, British North America to Limerick.
Huzza	United Kingdom	The ship was driven ashore and wrecked at Hartlepool, County Durham. Her crew were rescued.
Josephine	United Kingdom	The ship departed from Rouen, Seine-Inférieure, France for Gloucester. No further trace, presumed foundered with the loss of all hands.
Prince Rupert	United Kingdom	The ship was driven ashore and wrecked in Table Bay with the loss of one life on the ship and also of four rescuers from Bucophalus (United Kingdom). She was on a voyage from London to New Zealand.
Surprise	(United Kingdom of Great Britain and Ireland) Jersey	The lugger was wrecked on Scroby Sands, Norfolk.
Romp	United Kingdom	The brig ran aground on the Haisborough Sands, in the North Sea off the coast of Norfolk. She was on a voyage from Hull, Yorkshire to Hamburg. Romp was refloated on 8 September and towed into Great Yarmouth, Norfolk.

== 5 September ==
List of shipwrecks: 5 September 1841
Ship	State	Description
Deux Charles	France	The schooner was wrecked on the coast of Madagascar.
Paulinus	United Kingdom	The ship foundered in the Atlantic Ocean off Land's End, Cornwall. Her crew were rescued. She was on a voyage from Swansea, Glamorgan to London.

== 8 September ==
List of shipwrecks: 8 September 1841
Ship	State	Description
Hebe	(United Kingdom of Great Britain and Ireland) Tobago	The cutter was driven ashore at Tobago.
Kelso	United Kingdom	The full-rigged ship caught fire and was scuttled in the West India Docks, London. She had been refloated by 17 September.

== 10 September ==
List of shipwrecks: 10 September 1841
Ship	State	Description
Scandinavian	United Kingdom	The ship ran aground in the Straits of Magellan and was severely damaged. Her crew were rescued. She was on a voyage from Chile to Swansea, Glamorgan.

== 11 September ==
List of shipwrecks: 11 September 1841
Ship	State	Description
Hercule	France	The ship was wrecked at Saint Domingo. Her crew were rescued.
Lord Nelson	United Kingdom	The ship departed from Marseille, Bouches-du-Rhône, France for Falmouth, Cornwall. No further trace, presumed foundered with the loss of all hands.
Swift	United Kingdom	The schooner ran aground on Stroma, Orkney Islands. She was later refloated.
Twey Gebruder	Flag unknown	The ship struck the Cramstone Rock and consequently foundered in the North Sea off the Farne Island, Northumberland, United Kingdom. She was on a voyage from "Kholbrandt" to Leith, Lothian, United Kingdom.

== 12 September ==
List of shipwrecks: 12 September 1841
Ship	State	Description
Magnet Packet	United Kingdom	The ship departed from Plymouth, Devon for Santander, Spain. No further trace, presumed foundered with the loss of all hands.

== 13 September ==
List of shipwrecks: 13 September 1841
Ship	State	Description
Betty	United Kingdom	The full-rigged ship collided with another vessel and sank in the River Thames near Gravesend, Kent. She was on a voyage from Bremen to London. Betty was refloated on 21 September and taken into Rotherhithe, Kent.
Rebecca	United Kingdom	The ship struck the Blackwater Bank, in the Irish Sea off the coast of County Wexford and sank. Her crew were rescued.
Swift	United Kingdom	The ship ran aground off Stroma, Caithness. She was on a voyage from Peterhead, Aberdeenshire to Cork. Swift was refloated and put into Stromness, Orkney Islands.
Union	United Kingdom	The ship was abandoned in the Atlantic Ocean. Four crew were rescued by Josephine (United Kingdom). Union was on a voyage from Liverpool, Nova Scotia, British North America to Maryport, Cumberland.

== 14 September ==
List of shipwrecks: 13 September 1841
Ship	State	Description
Persian	United Kingdom	The collier, a brig, ran aground off Cromer, Norfolk and was damaged. She was assisted into Great Yarmouth, Norfolk with assistance from the fishing smacks Ann and Francis and Ditchburn (both United Kingdom).

== 15 September ==
List of shipwrecks: 15 September 1841
Ship	State	Description
Aquilla	Kingdom of Sardinia	The ship was wrecked at Fernando de Noronha, Brazil. All on board were rescued. She was on a voyage from Montevideo, Uruguay to Genoa.
Anna Margaretha	Flag unknown	The ship was driven ashore on "Stjorsand". She was refloated and put into "Hoyrand".
Asph	United Kingdom	The paddle steamer ran ashore on the Calf of Man, Isle of Man and was damaged. She consequently put into Port Erin. Asph was on a voyage from Holyhead to Donaghadee, County Antrim.
Neptune	Prussia	The barque ran aground on the Shipwash Sand, in the North Sea off the coast of Essex, United Kingdom. She was refloated the next day and taken into Harwich, Essex. Neptune was on a voyage from Danzig to London, United Kingdom.
Pelican	United Kingdom	The ship struck the pier and sank at Lyme, Dorset. She was on a voyage from Antwerp, Belgium to Axmouth, Devon.
St. Patrick	United Kingdom	The ship was driven ashore and wrecked in the Mud Islands, Nova Scotia, British North America. She was on a voyage from Saint John, New Brunswick, British North America to Bristol, Gloucestershire.

== 16 September ==
List of shipwrecks: 16 September 1841
Ship	State	Description
Cockermouth Castle	United Kingdom	The ship was driven ashore at Calais, France. She was on a voyage from Saint Petersburg, Russia to Plymouth, Devon.
Liberty	United Kingdom	The ship was driven ashore in the Sound of Hoy. She was refloated the next day.

== 17 September ==
List of shipwrecks: 17 September 1841
Ship	State	Description
Despatch	United Kingdom	The ship was struck rocks off Dunbar, Lothian and sank. Her crew were rescued. She was on a voyage from "St. Davids" to Plymouth, Devon.
Mangerton	United Kingdom	The schooner was driven ashore and wrecked on Copinsay, Orkney Islands. Her crew were rescued.
Marys	United Kingdom	The ship ran aground on the Liskar. She was refloated and resumed her voyage from Saint Petersburg, Russia to Rochester, Kent but consequently foundered off "Lavenskar" on 21 September. Her crew were rescued.

== 18 September ==
List of shipwrecks: 18 September 1841
Ship	State	Description
Clarence	United Kingdom	The ship was in collision with Andrew (United Kingdom) in the Baltic Sea. She was abandoned the next day. Her crew were rescued. Clarence was on a voyage from Hull, Yorkshire to Turku, Grand Duchy of Finland. She was subsequently towed into Katthammersvik, Sweden.
Criterion	United Kingdom	The ship departed from Marseille, Bouches-du-Rhône for Liverpool, Lancashire. No further trace, presumed foundered with the loss of all hands.
Despatch	United Kingdom	The schooner foundered off Dunbar, Lothian. Her six crew survived.
Experiment	United Kingdom	The ship sprang a leak and foundered in the Irish Sea off Point of Ayre, Isle of Man. Both crew were rescued by James (United Kingdom). Experiment was on a voyage from Carlisle, Cumberland to Douglas, Isle of Man.
Governor James	United Kingdom	The barque ran aground off Jamaica.
Marsden	United Kingdom	The ship caught fire in the North Sea. She put into Wainfleet, Lincolnshire, where she was scuttled. Marsden was on a voyage from Goole, Yorkshire to Maidstone, Kent.
Spitfire	United Kingdom	The schooner was run into by the barque Warrior and sank at Calcutta, India.

== 19 September ==
List of shipwrecks: 19 September 1841
Ship	State	Description
Eden	United Kingdom	The schooner sank at Great Yarmouth, Norfolk.
James	United Kingdom	The sloop was driven ashore at "Billowness". She was on a voyage from Leith, Lothian to Anstruther, Fife.
Madagascar	United Kingdom	Madagascar The paddle steamer was destroyed by fire on the coast of Fo-kien, China.
Surprise	(United Kingdom of Great Britain and Ireland) Jersey	The schooner was in collision with the collier brig Robert and Ann (United Kingdom) and was abandoned. She was subsequently wrecked on the Cross Sand.

== 20 September ==
List of shipwrecks: 20 September 1841
Ship	State	Description
Alfred	United Kingdom	The brig ran aground and sank on Scroby Sands, Norfolk.
Eden	United Kingdom	The schooner ran aground and sank on Scroby Sands. She was on a voyage from South Shields, County Durham to Maldon, Essex.
Hugh Taylor	United Kingdom	The brig ran aground and sank on Scroby Sands.
Keeper	United Kingdom	The ship was driven ashore and wrecked at Flamborough Head, Yorkshire. She was on a voyage from London to Sunderland, County Durham.
Margaret	United Kingdom	The brig was wrecked on Egg Island, British North America.
Sir Robert Peel	United Kingdom	The schooner was wrecked on Scroby Sands. She was on a voyage from Danzig to London.

== 21 September ==
List of shipwrecks: 21 September 1841
Ship	State	Description
Canton	United Kingdom	The ship was in collision with Henry and Harriet and capsized at Hull, Yorkshire.
Dorothea	Bremen	The ship was driven ashore near "Baltum". She was on a voyage from Christiansand, Norway to Bremen.
Emulous	United Kingdom	The brig was wrecked on Spurn Point, Yorkshire. Her crew were rescued. She was on a voyage from South Shields, County Durham to London.
Orient	United Kingdom	The ship struck rocks at South Shields, County Durham and was damaged. She put back to South Shields.
Pollock	United Kingdom	The ship ran aground on the Sheringham Shoal, in the North Sea off the coast of Norfolk. She was refloated but consequently foundered off the Inner Dowsing Lightship ( Trinity House). Her crew were rescued by Warwick (United Kingdom). Pollock was on a voyage from South Shields, County Durham, to London.
William	Sweden	The ship was driven ashore and wrecked in the Pentland Firth. She was on a voyage from Stockholm to Paraíba, Brazil. She was refloated on 23 September and taken into Stromness, Orkney Islands, United Kingdom.
William and Mary	United Kingdom	The ship was wrecked on Camden Point, Cornwall. Her crew were rescued. She was on a voyage from a Welsh port to Penzance, Cornwall.

== 22 September ==
List of shipwrecks: 22 September 1841
Ship	State	Description
Active	United Kingdom	The brig ran aground on the Gunfleet Sand, in the North Sea off the coast of Essex. She was on a voyage from Danzig to London. Active was refloated the next day with assistance from the smacks Good Agreement, Joseph, Moore and Prosperous (all United Kingdom) and taken into Harwich, Essex.
Aurora	United Kingdom	The ship ran aground at Topsham, Devon. She was on a voyage from Topsham to Riga, Russia.
Canton	United Kingdom	The full-rigged ship was in collision with the brig Henry and Harriet and capsized off Hartlepool, County Durham.
Clementine	United Kingdom	The ship was wrecked off Saltfleet, Lincolnshire. Her crew were rescued. She was on a voyage from Sunderland, County Durham to "Porbal".
Florida	United States	The barque was wrecked on the Brigantine Shoals, south west of Great Egg Harbour, New Jersey. She was on a voyage from Canton, China to New York.
John Pirie	(United Kingdom of Great Britain and Ireland) New South Wales	The ship was driven ashore and wrecked in Aldinga Bay. She was on a voyage from Port Phillip, South Australia to Sydney.
Prince of Wales	United Kingdom	The collier ran aground on the Gunfleet Sand. She was refloated the next day with assistance from the smacks Beulah, Fanny, Friend's Goodwill and another (all United Kingdom).
Themis	United Kingdom	The ship struck the Woolpack Sand, in the North Sea off the coast of Lincolnshire and foundered. Her crew were rescued. She was on a voyage from Stockton-on-Tees, County Durham to Saint-Brieuc, Côtes-du-Nord, France.

== 23 September ==
List of shipwrecks: 23 September 1841
Ship	State	Description
Talent	United States	The barque was driven ashore on George Island, Massachusetts.
William	Stettin	The ship was struck rocks in the Rutland Firth and was severely damaged. She was on a voyage from Stockholm to Paraíba, Brazil. William put into Stromness, Orkney Islands, United Kingdom.

== 24 September ==
List of shipwrecks: 24 September 1841
Ship	State	Description
Bridget	United Kingdom	The ship foundered in the Atlantic Ocean 25 nautical miles (46 km) north north west of Land's End, Cornwall. Her crew were rescued by a Dutch galiot. She was on a voyage from Llanelly, Glamorgan to Woolwich, Kent.
Clyde	United Kingdom	The ship was wrecked near Long Point, Nova Scotia, British North America. Her crew were rescued.
Dolphin	United Kingdom	The ship was driven ashore at Saltfleet, Lincolnshire. She was on a voyage from Stockton-on-Tees, County Durham to Great Yarmouth, Norfolk.
Eleanor	United Kingdom	The brig was wrecked at Cape North, Nova Scotia. Her crew were rescued.
Elisa	Denmark	The ship was driven ashore and wrecked near Travemünde, Prussia. Her crew were rescued.
Helen	United Kingdom	The ship was wrecked in the Saint Lawrence River. Her crew were rescued. She was on a voyage from Quebec City, Province of Canada, British North America to Limerick.
Mangerton	United Kingdom	The ship was wrecked on Copinsay, Orkney Islands. Her crew survived. She was on a voyage from Saint Petersburg, Russia to Cork.
Marie Emilie	France	The ship was wrecked on Grand Inagua, Bahamas. Her crew were rescued. She was on a voyage from Cuba to Marseille, Bouches-du-Rhône.

== 25 September ==
List of shipwrecks: 25 September 1841
Ship	State	Description
Argyle	United Kingdom	The schooner was wrecked on a reef in the Virgin Islands.
Charming Molly	United Kingdom	The ship was wrecked at Jersey, Channel Islands.
Devonport	United Kingdom	The ship sprang a leak and was abandoned off Placentia, Newfoundland, British North America. She was on a voyage from Pictou, Nova Scotia, British North America to Liverpool, Lancashire. Devonport was subsequently taken into Placentia.

== 26 September ==
List of shipwrecks: 26 September 1841
Ship	State	Description
Allendale	United Kingdom	The ship ran aground on the Black Middens, in the North Sea off the coast of County Durham. Her crew were rescued.
Alonzo	United Kingdom	The ship was driven ashore near Gothem, Sweden with the loss of three of her crew. She was on a voyage from Saint Petersburg, Russia to London, United Kingdom. She was refloated and taken into "Slitehamn".
Amanda	United Kingdom	The barque was wrecked on Little Metis Point, Province of Canada, British North America with the loss of 43 of the 58 people on board.

== 27 September ==
List of shipwrecks: 27 September 1841
Ship	State	Description
Abel Gower	United Kingdom	The ship was driven ashore at Rocky Point, Jamaica. She was on a voyage from Old Harbour, Jamaica to London. Abel Gower was later refloated.
Sisters	United Kingdom	The ship foundered in the Bristol Channel off Flat Holm and Steep Holm with the loss of a crew member.

== 28 September ==
List of shipwrecks: 28 September 1841
Ship	State	Description
Active	United Kingdom	The ship sank in Studland Bay.
Adelaide	United Kingdom	The ship was driven ashore near Girvan, Ayrshire. She was on a voyage from Drogheda, County Louth to Irvine, Ayrshire.
Eliza	United Kingdom	The ship ran aground on No Man's Land, in the Solent. She was on a voyage from Newport, Monmouthshire to Southampton, Hampshire. She was refloated and completed her voyage.
Helen Stuart	United Kingdom	The ship was driven ashore on Crane Island. She was on a voyage from Quebec City, Province of Canada, British North America to Limerick.

== 29 September ==
List of shipwrecks: 29 September 1841
Ship	State	Description
Brothers	United Kingdom	The ship was driven ashore at the mouth of the Great Rias d'Or, British North America.
Elizabeth	United Kingdom	The ship sprang a leak and sank at Ramsgate, Kent.
Freundschaft	Danzig	The ship foundered. Her crew were rescued. She was on a voyage from Leith, Lothian, United Kingdom to Danzig.
Normanby	United Kingdom	The ship ran aground on the Cutler Sand, in the North Sea off the coast of Suffolk. She was on a voyage from Stockton-on-Tees, County Durham to Chatham, Kent. Normanby was refloated and towed into Harwich, Essex by Aurora's Increase and Hero (both United Kingdom).

== 30 September ==
List of shipwrecks: 30 September 1841
Ship	State	Description
Dee	United Kingdom	The ship was wrecked in St. George's Bay, Newfoundland, British North America). Her crew were rescued.

== Unknown date ==
List of shipwrecks: Unknown date in September 1841
Ship	State	Description
Amanda	United Kingdom	The ship was wrecked near Nantes, Loire-Inférieure, France. She was on a voyage from Nantes to Southampton, Hampshire.
Annandale	United Kingdom	The ship ran aground on the Black Middens, in the North Sea off the coast of County Durham and was severely damaged. She was refloated on 30 September and beached at South Shields.
Briton	United Kingdom	The ship was wrecked on Gotland, Sweden. Her crew were rescued. She was on a voyage from Kronstadt, Russia to Rochester, Kent.
Helen Mar	United States	The ship was wrecked on the Silver Key before 8 September. She was on a voyage from Saint Thomas, Virgin Islands to the Turks Islands.
Indus	United Kingdom	The ship ran aground on the James and Mary Sand. She was on a voyage from Calcutta, India to China. Indus was refloated and put back to Calcutta for repairs.
Lapwing	(United Kingdom of Great Britain and Ireland) New Zealand	The schooner was wrecked in Hawke Bay, driven ashore during a heavy gale early in the month.
Neptune	United Kingdom	The ship was driven ashore at Aberdyfi, Merionethshire. She was on a voyage from Quebec City, Province of Canada, British North America to Aberdyfi. Neptune was refloated on 14 September and taken into Aberdyfi.
Nerbudda	United Kingdom	The transport ship struck a rock off Formosa and was abandoned with the loss of about 60 of the 237 people on board. Survivors were taken prisoner by the Chinese and were mistreated. They were subsequently executed about 18 August 1842.
Romp	Hamburg	The ship ran aground on the Haisborough Sands, in the North Sea off the coast of Norfolk, United Kingdom. She was on a voyage from Hull, Yorkshire, United Kingdom to Hull. Romp was refloated on 8 September and taken into Great Yarmouth, Norfolk.
Sophia Pate	(United Kingdom of Great Britain and Ireland) New Zealand	The brig was stranded and wrecked on a sandbank at the mouth of the Kaipara Harbour, en route from Auckland to the Wairoa River, with the loss of 21 lives.
Triton	Russia	The barque ran aground on the Shipwash Sand. She was refloated and taken into Harwich with assistance from Aurora's Increase and Sarah (both United Kingdom).
