= Lady Denison =

1850 shipwreck off Tasmania

History

United Kingdom
- Name: Lady Denison
- Namesake: Spouse of William Denison
- Owner: Nathan Moses & Co.
- Laid down: Port Arthur, Tasmania
- Launched: 1847
- Fate: Wrecked 1850

General characteristics
- Tons burthen: 158 (bm)
- Sail plan: Barque

Lady Denison was launched in 1847 at Port Arthur, Tasmania. She went missing in 1850 while sailing between Port Adelaide and Hobart, Tasmania. At the time there were strong allegations that convicts being carried on board murdered the other passengers and crew and headed for San Francisco, but all contemporary evidence supports the assertion that she sank off the far north-western tip of Tasmania.

== Transferring convicts ==
South Australia prided itself as a colony not founded by convict transportation, and felons who found their way there from the convict colonies were deported to Van Diemen's Land, secured below decks on commercial sailing vessels. Lady Denison was fulfilling such a contract when she sailed from Port Adelaide for Hobart on 17 April 1850 under Captain Edwin Hammond with a crew of 12, 16 paying passengers, 11 convicts, and three prison guards: mounted constable Hill and metropolitan policemen Ward and Freebody. She failed to arrive and dark rumours of her fate spread rapidly. Several months later a large quantity of wreckage positively identified as coming from the vessel was found on the Tasmanian coast south of Cape Grim. The anti-transportation press asserted that the convicts had thrown the articles overboard to hide their crime. During the Australian gold rush there were reports that John Byett alias James Coyle, one of the convicts by the ship had been seen in Victoria and rumours that another had sent letters to Australia from California.

== Analysis ==
The alleged mutiny and massacre on Lady Denison was part of the Australasian Anti-Transportation League's campaign against the transportation of convicts to Van Diemen's Land, which it largely carried out by means of public rallies and press reports in papers owned by its supporters, all aiming at vilifying the convict population. Similar baseless allegations were made four years later after the ship Madagascar went missing between Melbourne and London.

Weather conditions at the time Lady Denison approached the Tasmanian coastline were extreme, two other vessels being lost in Bass Strait around the time. There is circumstantial evidence that wreckage including bodies were found by sealers in the vicinity of Arthur River, Tasmania, the bodies plundered of valuables and disposed of, and the circumstances not reported so their thefts were hidden. In addition, one or more convicts may have managed to struggle ashore alive. James Coyle, in particular, had himself been a convict escapee from Van Diemen's Land, had worked in the Circular Head area, and probably still had friends willing to help him.

== Sources ==
- Broxam, Graeme, (1993) Shipwrecks of Tasmania's Wild West Coast, Navarine Publishing, Canberra, ISBN 0-646-16381-7 Roebuck Society publication; no. 44.
- Villiers, Alan J., (1931) Vanished Fleets: Ships and Men of Old Van Diemens Land, Garden City Publishing Co. Inc., New York.
