= Malagasy =

Malagasy may refer to:

- Someone or something from Madagascar
- Malagasy people
- Malagasy language
- Malagasy Republic
- Related to the culture of Madagascar

== See also ==
- Madagascar (disambiguation)
