= HMS Madagascar =

Two ships of the Royal Navy have been named HMS Madagascar after the island of Madagascar off the coast of Africa:

- HMS Madagascar (1811) was 38-gun fifth rate formerly the French ship Nereide. She was captured in 1811 and was broken up in 1819.
- HMS Madagascar (1822) was a 46-gun fifth rate launched in 1822. She was placed on harbour service from 1853 and was sold in 1863.

== See also ==
- PS Madagascar (1841 ship) served as a transport during the First Opium War but was NOT part of the British Navy; she was burnt by accident in September 1841.
- List of ships named Madagascar
