= List of ships named Madagascar =

Several ships have been named Madagascar, for the island of Madagascar:

- Madagascar (1837 ship) was a large British merchant ship built for the trade to India and China that disappeared on a voyage from Melbourne to London in 1853.
- PS Madagascar (1838 ship) was a paddle steamer that served the British Empire as a troop transport in the First Opium War, during which conflict an accidental fire destroyed her.

== See also ==
- HMS Madagascar
