= PS Madagascar =

19th century British militar paddle steamer

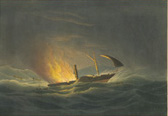
- Paddle steamer Madagascar consumed by fire during a typhoon at the entrance to the Formosa Channel. From an engraving by E. Duncan, based on a painting by W. J. Huggins after an original sketch by Capt. Dicey.

History

United Kingdom
- Builder: Blyth and Sons, London
- Launched: 1838
- Home port: Mauritius
- Fate: Burned and sunk, September 1841

General characteristics
- Type: Paddle steamer
- Tons burthen: 201
- Installed power: Coal
- Propulsion: Paddle wheels

Madagascar was a 19th-century paddle steamer that served the British Empire as a troop transport in the First Opium War, during which conflict an accidental fire destroyed her.

== History ==
Blyth and Sons built Madagascar as a wooden paddle steamer of 201 tons (bm) in 1838. By 1840 her homeport was Mauritius.

Following the decision of the British Parliament to send an expeditionary force to China, Foreign Secretary Lord Palmerston began to muster soldiers and ships for the upcoming war (which later became known as the First Opium War) with the Qing Dynasty. In preparation for the China campaign, the British Government purchased the Madagascar as part of the Royal Navy's efforts to consolidate and strengthen its forces in the Far East.

In the spring of 1840, the Madagascar was ordered to Singapore, where the expedition was gathering. The steamer quickly departed Bengal, but due to its high consumption of coal on her voyage to Penang, the crew had to burn her yards and sail booms.

The steamer was attached to the China Squadron, in which she served as a troop transport and supply ship. When the British fleet approached Peking to negotiate with the Chinese government, the shallow-drafted (a feature that allowed the ship to cross sandbars in the shallow Yellow Sea) Madagascar was used as a meeting site between British and Qing officials. The steamer continued to follow the main British fleet, and participated extensively in the Pearl River campaign. After the Second Battle of Canton the steamer departed China to make repairs in India. On her return trip to China in September 1841, she caught fire around 80 miles off the coast of the newly acquired British base at Hong Kong. The lascars and British crew evacuated the ship after it was discovered that the fire had spread to Madagascar's coal stores. The men in the boats were 10 miles away when they later saw her blow up when her ammunition detonated. The Chinese captured the crew, but the crew were able to pass themselves off as American merchants and were later released at Macau.
