= Convict ships to New South Wales =

Ships transporting British convicts

The use of convict ships to New South Wales began on 18 August 1786, when the decision was made to send a colonisation party of convicts, military, and civilian personnel to Botany Bay. Transportation to the Colony of New South Wales was finally officially abolished on 1 October 1850. This list reflects vessels that transported convicts to New South Wales as currently represented, it does not include transportations to colonies or ports that were once part of New South Wales.

== A ==
Name	Date of arrival	Sailed from	Notes
Active (1764 ship)	26 September 1791	Plymouth	Part of Third Fleet
Adamant (1811 ship)	8 September 1821	England	
Adelaide	24 December 1849	London	
Admiral Barrington (1781 ship)	16 October 1791	Portsmouth	Part of Third Fleet
Admiral Gambier (1807 ship)	20 December 1808	Portsmouth	First convict voyage to NSW
Admiral Gambier	29 September 1811	England	Second convict voyage to NSW
Adrian (1819 ship)	20 August 1830	Portsmouth	
Aeolus	26 January 1809	London	
Agamemnon (1811 ship)	22 September 1820	Portsmouth	
Albemarle	13 October 1791	Portsmouth	Part of Third Fleet
Albion (1813 ship)	14 February 1827	Plymouth	First convict voyage to NSW
Albion	3 November 1828	Sheerness	Second convict voyage to NSW
Alexander (1783 ship)	26 January 1788	Spithead	Part of First Fleet
Alexander (1801 ship)	20 August 1806	Portsmouth	
Alexander (1811)	4 April 1816	Ireland	
Alice	1 March 1835	Hobart Town	
Almorah (1817)	29 August 1817	Downs	First convict voyage to NSW
Almorah	22 December 1820	Waterford	Second convict voyage to NSW
Almorah	20 August 1824	Cork	Third convict voyage to NSW
Amboyna (1807 ship)	1 January 1822	India	
America	18 August 1829	Woolwich	
Amphitrite (1802 ship)	Wrecked at outset of voyage	Woolwich	108 female convicts and 12 children drowned
Andromeda	18 December 1830	Cork	First convict voyage to NSW
Andromeda	11 March 1833	Portsmouth	Second convict voyage to NSW
Andromeda	17 September 1834	Cork	Third convict voyage to NSW
Ann and Amelia (1816 ship)	2 January 1825	Cork	
Ann	30 June 1825	Mauritius	
Anne (1799 ship)	21 February 1801	Cork	
Ann (1797 ship)	27 February 1810	Spithead	
Arab	15 August 1834	Hobart Town	
Archduke Charles (1809 ship)	16 February 1813	Cork	
Asia (1818 ship)	28 December 1820	England	First convict voyage to NSW
Asia	24 July 1822	England	Second convict voyage to NSW
Asia	22 February 1825	Cork	Third convict voyage to NSW
Asia	13 March 1828	London	Fourth convict voyage to NSW
Asia	13 January 1830	Cork	Fifth convict voyage to NSW
Asia	13 February 1832	Portsmouth	Sixth convict voyage to NSW
Asia	27 June 1833	Downs	Seventh convict voyage to NSW
Asia	22 March 1836	Hobart Town	Eighth convict voyage to NSW
Asia (1815 ship)	29 April 1825	Portsmouth	First convict voyage to NSW
Asia	7 December 1827	Portsmouth	Second convict voyage to NSW
Asia	2 December 1831	Cork	Third convict voyage to NSW
Asia	2 December 1836	Torbay	Fourth convict voyage to NSW
Atlantic (1783 ship)	20 August 1791	Plymouth	Part of Third Fleet
Atlas (1801 South Shields ship)	7 July 1802	Ireland	First convict voyage to NSW
Atlas	19 October 1819	Gravesend	Second convict voyage to NSW.
Atlas (December 1801 ship)	30 October 1802	Cork	
Atlas (1811 ship)	22 July 1816	Portsmouth	
Aurora (1816 ship)	3 November 1833	Portsmouth	

== B ==
Name	Date of arrival	Sailed from	Notes
Bardaster	3 February 1836	Hobart Town	One convict transported from Hobart.
Baring	7 September 1815	England	First convict voyage to NSW
Baring	26 June 1819	Downs	Second convict voyage to NSW
Barrosa	8 December 1839	Sheerness	
Barwell	18 May 1798	Portsmouth	
Batavia	5 April 1818	Plymouth	
Bellona	16 January 1793	Gravesend	
Bencoolen	25 August 1819	Cork	
Bengal Merchant	30 January 1835	London	First convict voyage to NSW
Bengal Merchant	9 December 1836	Downs	Second convict voyage to NSW
Bengal Merchant	21 July 1838	Sheerness	Third convict voyage to NSW
Blackwell	29 September 1835	Cork	
Blenheim	14 November 1834	Cork	First convict voyage to NSW
Blenheim	5 August 1837	Hobart Town	Second convict voyage to NSW
Blenhiem	27 September 1839	Dublin	Third convict voyage to NSW
Boddington	7 August 1793	Cork	
Boddingtons	22 April 1828	Hobart Town	Not clear that she actually carried convicts
Borodino	12 July 1828	Cork	
Bombay	26 July 1830	Calcutta	10 prisoners from Calcutta
Boyd	14 August 1809	Cork	
Boyne	28 October 1826	Cork	
Brampton	22 April 1823	Cork	
Bridgewater	11 May 1816	Bengal	
Britannia	14 February 1814	Bengal	First convict voyage to NSW
Britannia (1783 whaler)	14 October 1791	Portsmouth	First convict voyage to NSW. Part of Third Fleet
Britannia	18 July 1798	Portsmouth	Second convict voyage to NSW
Britannia (1774 ship)	27 May 1797	Cork	First convict voyage to NSW
Brothers	7 May 1824	Downs	First convict voyage to NSW
Brothers	2 February 1827	Cork	Second convict voyage to NSW
Broxbornebury	28 July 1814	England	
Buffalo	5 October 1833	Portsmouth	First convict voyage to NSW
Buffalo	27 June 1837	Adelaide	Second convict voyage to NSW
Buffalo	25 February 1840	Quebec	Third convict voyage to NSW
Burrell	19 December 1830	Plymouth	First convict voyage to NSW
Burrell	20 May 1832	Woolwich	Second convict voyage to NSW
Bussorah Merchant	26 July 1828	London	First convict voyage to NSW
Bussorah Merchant	14 December 1831	Dublin	Second convict voyage to NSW

== C ==
Name	Date of arrival	Sailed from	Notes
Calcutta	5 August 1837	Dublin	
Calder	20 November 1822	Calcutta	
Caledonia	17 December 1838	Madras	First convict voyage to NSW
Caledonia	30 April 1840	Swan River	Second convict voyage to NSW
Calista	13 April 1828	Hobart Town	
Cambridge	17 September 1827	Dublin	
Camden	25 July 1831	London	First convict voyage to NSW
Camden	18 February 1833	Sheerness	Second convict voyage to NSW
Campbell Macquarie	17 January 1812	Calcutta	
Canada	14 December 1801	Spithead	First convict voyage to NSW
Canada	8 September 1810	England	Second convict voyage to NSW
Canada	5 August 1815	Cork	Third convict voyage to NSW
Canada	6 August 1817	Cork	Fourth convict voyage to NSW
Canada	1 September 1819	London	Fifth convict voyage to NSW
Captain Cook	2 April 1832	Dublin	First convict voyage to NSW
Captain Cook	26 August 1833	Portsmouth	Second convict voyage to NSW
Captain Cook	13 November 1836	Cork	Third convict voyage to NSW
Caroline	31 July 1831	Madras & Calcutta	
Caroline	6 August 1833	Cork	
Castle Forbes	27 January 1820	Cork	First convict voyage to NSW
Castle Forbes	15 January 1824	Cork	Second convict voyage to NSW
Catherine	4 May 1814	Falmouth	
Cawdry	1 January 1826	India & Ceylon	
Celia	14 October 1828	Mauritius	First convict voyage to NSW
Celia	11 March 1831	Mauritius	Second convict voyage to NSW
Ceylon	21 August 1830	Ceylon	
Champion	17 October 1827	London	
Chapman	26 July 1817	Cork	First convict voyage to NSW
Chapman	3 November 1826	Hobart Town	Second convict voyage to NSW
Charles Dumergue	16 July 1837	Madras	
Charles Kerr	9 October 1837	Spithead	
Charlotte	26 January 1788	Spithead	Part of First Fleet
Christina	29 August 1840	Adelaide	
City of Edinburgh	12 November 1828	Cork	First convict voyage to NSW
City of Edinburgh	27 June 1832	Cork	Second convict voyage to NSW
Claudine	6 December 1829	London	
Clorinda	12 May 1835	Ceylon	
Clyde	27 August 1832	Portsmouth	First convict voyage to NSW
Clyde	10 September 1838	Dublin	Second convict voyage to NSW
Competitor	10 October 1828	London	
Coromandel	13 June 1802	Spithead	First convict voyage to NSW
Coromandel	7 May 1804	England	Second convict voyage to NSW
HMS Coromandel	4 April 1820	Spithead	
Countess of Harcourt	21 December 1823	Cork	First convict voyage to NSW
Countess of Harcourt	12 July 1824	Downs	Second convict voyage to NSW
Countess of Harcourt	28 June 1827	Dublin	Third convict voyage to NSW
Countess of Harcourt	8 September 1828	London	Fourth convict voyage to NSW
Courier	23 March 1833	Port Louis	
Currency Lass	11 October 1834	Hobart Town	First convict voyage to NSW
Currency Lass	29 July 1835	Hobart Town	Second convict voyage to NSW

== D ==
Name	Date of arrival	Sailed from	Notes
HMS Daphne (1806)	21 September 1819	Cork	
Dart (1818 ship)	26 June 1831	Mauritius	First convict voyage to NSW - Transported 1 military convict
Dart	31 December 1833	Mauritius	Second convict voyage to NSW - Transported a number of military convicts
Dart	9 July 1834	Mauritius	Third convict voyage to NSW - Transported a number of military convicts
Diamond (1835 ship)	28 March 1838	Cork	
Diana (1824 ship)	25 May 1833	Woolwich	
Dick (1788 ship)	12 March 1821	England	
Dorothy (1815 ship)	19 September 1820	Cork	
Dorset	1 December 1840	Adelaide	Transported 9 male convicts
HMS Dromedary	28 January 1820	England	
Drummore (1830 ship)	12 September 1831	Mauritius	Transported 1 military convict
HMS Duchess of York (1801)	4 April 1807	India	Transported 2 military convicts
Duke of Portland (1794 ship)	27 July 1807	England	First convict voyage to NSW
Duke of Portland	25 January 1809	Portsmouth	Second convict voyage to NSW
Dunvegan Castle (1819 ship)	30 March 1830	Sherness	First convict voyage to NSW
Dunvegan Castle	16 October 1832	Dublin	Second convict voyage to NSW

== E ==
Name	Date of arrival	Sailed from	Notes
Eagle	17 February 1811	Calcutta	Transported military convicts
Earl Cornwallis	12 June 1801	England	
Earl Grey	31 December 1836	Cork	First convict voyage to NSW
Earl Grey	21 November 1838	Portsmouth	Second convict voyage to NSW
Earl of Liverpool	5 April 1831	London	
Earl Spencer	9 October 1813	England	
Earl St. Vincent	16 December 1818	Cork	First convict voyage to NSW
Earl St. Vincent	16 August 1820	Portsmouth	Second convict voyage to NSW
Earl St. Vincent	9 September 1823	Cork	Third convict voyage to NSW
Eden	14 January 1837	Hobart Town	First convict voyage to NSW
Eden	18 November 1840	Sheerness	Second convict voyage to NSW
Edward	26 April 1829	Cork	First convict voyage to NSW
Edward	22 February 1831	Cork	Second convict voyage to NSW
Edward Lombes	6 January 1833	India	Transported military convicts
Eleanor (1821 ship)	25 June 1831	Portsmouth	
Eliza (1811 ship)	5 July 1813	Calcutta	First convict voyage to NSW
Eliza	16 May 1815	Calcutta	Second convict voyage to NSW
Eliza	16 May 1828	Hobart	
Eliza (1804 ship)	21 January 1820	England	First convict voyage to NSW
Eliza	22 November 1822	Sheerness	Second convict voyage to NSW
Eliza	8 November 1827	Cork	Third convict voyage to NSW
Eliza	20 June 1829	Cork	Fourth convict voyage to NSW
Eliza	6 September 1832	Cork	Fifth convict voyage to NSW
Eliza (1815 ship)	18 November 1828	London	
Elizabeth (1825 Yarmouth brig)	20 December 1830	Hobart	
Elizabeth (1825 New Brunswick barque)	20 May 1833	Singapore	
Elizabeth (1830 ship)	17 December 1838	Singapore & Swan River	Transported military convicts
Elizabeth (1809 ship)	5 October 1816	England	First convict voyage to NSW
Elizabeth	19 November 1818	Cork	Second convict voyage to NSW
Elizabeth	31 December 1820	The Downs	Third convict voyage to NSW
Elizabeth	12 January 1828	Cork	
Elizabeth (1805 ship)	12 October 1836	London	
Ellen	5 January 1837	Mauritius	
Elphinstone	29 December 1838	Dublin	
Emma Eugenia	9 February 1838	Portsmouth	
Enchantress	16 January 1834	Mauritius	Transported a military convict
England	18 September 1826	Downs	First convict voyage to NSW
England	1835	Portsmouth	Second convict voyage to NSW
Eudora	22 November 1840	Bombay	Transported military convicts
Exmouth	28 July 1831	Woolwich	
Experiment	24 June 1804	Cowes	
Experiment	25 June 1809	Cork	

== F ==
Name	Date of arrival	Sailed from	Notes
Fairlie	15 February 1834	England	
Fame	8 March 1817	Spithead	
Fanny	18 January 1816	The Downs	
Fanny	2 February 1833	The Downs	
Fergusson	26 March 1829	Spithead	
Flora	8 November 1829	Spithead	
Florentia	3 January 1828	England	First convict voyage to NSW
Florentia	15 December 1830	Ireland	Second convict voyage to NSW
Forth	26 April 1830	Cork	
Forth	12 October 1830	Cork	First convict voyage to NSW
Forth	3 February 1835	Cork	Second convict voyage to NSW
Fortune	12 July 1806	England	First convict voyage to NSW
Fortune	11 June 1813	England	Second convict voyage to NSW
Francis & Eliza	8 August 1815	Cork	
Freak	23 June 1839	Mauritius	
Frederick	18 June 1814	Calcutta	First convict voyage to NSW
Frederick	24 April 1815	Calcutta	Second convict voyage to NSW
Frederick	22 November 1817	Calcutta	Third convict voyage to NSW
Frederick & Maria	19 June 1811	Calcutta	Transported a number of military convicts from Bengal
Friends	10 October 1811	England	
Friendship	26 January 1788	Spithead	Part of First Fleet
Friendship	16 February 1800	Cork	First convict voyage to NSW
Friendship	14 January 1818	England	Second convict voyage to NSW

== G ==
Name	Date of arrival	Sailed from	Notes
Gaillardon	30 March 1838	Calcutta	First convict voyage to NSW
Gaillardon	27 December 1838	Madras	Second convict voyage to NSW
Gaillardon	22 October 1839	Calcutta	Third convict voyage to NSW
Ganges	2 June 1797	Portsmouth	
General Hewett	7 February 1814	England	
General Stuart (or General Stewart)	31 December 1818	Portsmouth	
George Hibbert	1 December 1834	Downs	
Georgiana	12 June 1829	Hobart Town	First convict voyage to NSW
Georgiana	27 July 1831	London	Second convict voyage to NSW
Gilmore	21 April 1832	Hobart Town	First convict voyage to NSW
Gilmore	4 March 1839	Hobart Town	Second convict voyage to NSW
Giraffe	24 February 1836	Swan River	
HMS Glatton	11 March 1803	England	
Globe	8 January 1819	Portsmouth	
Glory	14 September 1818	Sheerness	
HMS Gorgon	21 September 1791	England	Part of Third Fleet
Governor Bourke	21 February 1833	Swan River	
Governor Phillip	4 July 1826	Mauritius	
Governor Ready	16 January 1829	Cork	
Grenada	21 October 1819	Sheerness	First convict voyage to NSW
Grenada	16 September 1821	Portsmouth	Second convict voyage to NSW
Grenada	23 January 1825	London	Third convict voyage to NSW
Grenada	23 January 1827	Downs	Fourth convict voyage to NSW
Greyhound	14 April 1819	Calcutta	
HMS Guardian		Spithead	Hit iceberg and was beached at Cape of Good Hope
Guide	9 November 1818	Calcutta	
Guildford	18 January 1812	London	First convict voyage to NSW
Guildford	8 April 1816	Ireland	Second convict voyage to NSW
Guildford	1 April 1818	Cork	Third convict voyage to NSW
Guildford	30 September 1820	Portsmouth	Fourth convict voyage to NSW
Guildford	15 July 1822	London	Fifth convict voyage to NSW
Guildford	5 March 1824	Portsmouth	Sixth convict voyage to NSW
Guildford	25 July 1827	Plymouth	Seventh convict voyage to NSW
Guildford	4 November 1829	Dublin	Eight convict voyage to NSW

== H ==
Name	Date of arrival	Sailed from	Notes
Hadlow	24 December 1818	England	First convict voyage to NSW
Hadlow	5 August 1820	Cork	Second convict voyage to NSW
Haldane	18 December 1820	Calcutta	
Harmony	27 September 1827	London	
Harvey	27 August 1827	Hobart	
Hashemy	9 June 1849	Portsmouth	
Havering	8 November 1849	Dublin	
Hayeston	13 March 1816	Madras	
Hebe	31 December 1820	England	
Heber	12 July 1837	Dublin	
Helen	13 October 1832	Mauritius	
Henry	26 August 1823	London	First convict voyage to NSW
Henry	27 February 1825	London	Second convict voyage to NSW
Henry	26 February 1839	Mauritius	
Henry Porcher	3 December 1825	Dublin	First convict voyage to NSW
Henry Porcher	1 January 1835	Downs	Second convict voyage to NSW
Henry Tanner	26 October 1834	London	
Henry Wellesley	7 February 1836	Portsmouth	First convict voyage to NSW
Henry Wellesley	22 December 1837	Woolwich	Second convict voyage to NSW
Hercules	26 June 1801	Ireland	
Hercules	7 May 1825	Portsmouth	First convict voyage to NSW
Hercules	1 November 1830	Dublin	Second convict voyage to NSW
Hercules	16 October 1832	Downs	Third convict voyage to NSW
Hero	31 August 1835	Dublin	
Heroine	19 September 1833	Portsmouth	
Hillsborough	26 July 1799	Portsmouth	Death toll among her convicts of almost one-third
Hind	16 October 1838	Mauritius	
Hindostan	24 November 1821	Portsmouth	
Hive	11 June 1834	Portsmouth	First convict voyage to NSW
Hive	10 December 1835	Ireland	Second convict voyage to NSW, Wrecked south of Jervis Bay
Hooghly	22 April 1825	Cork	First convict voyage to NSW
Hooghly	24 February 1828	London	Second convict voyage to NSW
Hooghly	27 September 1831	Cork	Third convict voyage to NSW
Hooghly	18 November 1834	Portsmouth	Fourth convict voyage to NSW
Hunter	20 August 1810	India	
Hunter	14 April 1817	Bengal	

== I ==
Name	Date of arrival	Sailed from	Notes
Indefatigable (1799 ship)	26 April 1815	England	
Indian (1810 ship)	16 December 1810	England	
Indispensable (1791 ship)	30 April 1796	England	First convict voyage to NSW
Indispensable	18 August 1809	England	Second convict voyage to NSW
Integrity (1824 ship)	17 August 1837	Mauritius	First convict voyage to NSW
Integrity	5 July 1838	Mauritius	Second convict voyage to NSW
Isabella (1818 ship)	14 September 1818	Spithead	First convict voyage to NSW
Isabella	9 March 1822	Cork	Second convict voyage to NSW
Isabella	16 December 1823	Ireland	Third convict voyage to NSW
Isabella	15 March 1832	Plymouth	Fourth convict voyage to NSW
Isabella (1823 ship)	6 May 1837	Mauritius	First convict voyage to NSW
Isabella (1827 ship)	24 July 1840	Dublin	First convict voyage to NSW

== J ==
Name	Date of arrival	Sailed from	Notes
James Laing	29 June 1834	Dublin	
James Pattison	20 January 1830	Dublin	First convict voyage to NSW
James Pattison	25 October 1837	Sheerness	Second convict voyage to NSW
Jane	5 November 1831	Cork	
Janus	3 May 1820	Cork	
Java	18 November 1833	Cork	
Jeune Ferdinand	17 December 1816	Isle de France	
John	25 November 1827	London	First convict voyage to NSW
John	13 September 1829	Sheerness	Second convict voyage to NSW
John	8 June 1832	Downs	Third convict voyage to NSW
John	7 February 1837	Sheerness	
John Barry	26 September 1819	Portsmouth	First convict voyage to NSW
John Barry	7 November 1821	Cork	Second convict voyage to NSW
John Barry	16 September 1834	Hobart Town	Third convict voyage to NSW
John Barry	17 January 1836	Torbay	Fourth convict voyage to NSW
John Barry	22 March 1839	Sheerness	Fifth convict voyage to NSW
John Bull	18 December 1821	Cork	
John Bull	5 December 1822	Calcutta	
John Denniston	16 July 1835		
John Renwick	27 August 1838	Downs	
Jolly Rambler	19 May 1833	Swan River	Transported one convict

== K ==
Name	Date of arrival	Sailed from	Notes
Kains	11 March 1831	London	
Kangaroo	5 February 1816	Ceylon	
Kate	2 December 1839	Adelaide	
Katherine Stewart Forbes (1818 ship)	18 February 1830	Spithead	
Killmours	18 August 1838	Mauritius	
King William	17 August 1840	Dublin	
Kitty (1787 ship)	18 November 1792	England	

== L ==
Name	Date of arrival	Sailed from	Notes
Lady Castlereagh	30 April 1818	England	
Lady Feversham	29 July 1830	Portsmouth	
Lady Harewood	4 March 1831	Sheerness	First convict voyage to NSW
Lady Harewood	5 August 1832	Portsmouth	Second convict voyage to NSW
Lady Juliana	3 June 1790	Plymouth	Part of Second Fleet
Lady Kennaway	4 March 1835	Portsmouth and Cork	First convict voyage to NSW
Lady Kennaway	12 October 1836	The Downs	Second convict voyage to NSW
Lady Macnaghten	26 October 1835	Dublin	
Lady Nugent	9 April 1835	Sheerness	
Lady Nugent	2 December 1836	London	
Lady Penrhyn	26 January 1788	Spithead	Part of First Fleet
Lady Rowena	17 May 1826	Cork	
Larkins	22 November 1817	Portsmouth	First convict voyage to NSW
Larkins	12 December 1829	Cork	Second convict voyage to NSW
Larkins	24 November 1831		Convict voyage to Van Dieman's Land
Layton	8 November 1829	London	Also made three convict voyages to Van Diemen's Land
Layton	27 January 1840	Mauritius	
Little Mary	13 May 1819	Isle de France	
Lloyds	18 December 1833	The Downs	First convict voyage to NSW
Lloyds	17 July 1837	The Downs	Second convict voyage to NSW
Lochiel	4 May 1835		
Lonarch	4 September 1825	Cork	
Lord Eldon (1802 EIC ship)	30 September 1817	England	
Lord Lyndoch (1814 ship)	18 October 1833	Sheerness	First convict voyage to NSW
Lord Lyndoch	8 August 1838	England	Second convict voyage to NSW
Lord Melville	24 February 1817	England	
Lord Melville	6 May 1829	London	First convict voyage to NSW
Lord Melville	21 October 1830	The Downs	Second convict voyage to NSW
Lord Sidmouth	11 March 1819	Sheerness	First convict voyage to NSW
Lord Sidmouth	19 February 1821	Cork	Second convict voyage to NSW
Lord Sidmouth	27 February 1823	Woolwich	Third convict voyage to NSW
Lord Wellington	20 January 1820	England and Ireland	
Louisa	3 December 1827	Woolwich	
Lucy Davidson	2 November 1829	London	

== M ==
Name	Date of arrival	Sailed from	Notes
Maitland (1811 ship)	14 July 1840	Sheerness	
Malabar (1804 ship)	30 October 1819	Spithead	
Mangalore (1811 ship)	2 November 1811	Calcutta	
Mangles (1803 ship)	7 August 1820	Falmouth	First convict voyage to NSW
Mangles	8 November 1822	Cork	Second convict voyage to NSW
Mangles	27 October 1824	Portsmouth	Third convict voyage to NSW
Mangles	18 February 1826	Cork	Fourth convict voyage to NSW
Mangles	2 June 1828	Dublin	Fifth convict voyage to NSW
Mangles	19 April 1833	London	Sixth convict voyage to NSW
Mangles	10 July 1837	Portsmouth	Seventh convict voyage to NSW
Mangles	27 April 1840	Portsmouth	Eighth convict voyage to NSW
Manlius (1826 ship)	11 August 1827	The Downs	
Margaret	30 May 1837	Cork	First convict voyage to NSW
Margaret	5 January 1839	Dublin	Second convict voyage to NSW
Margaret	17 August 1840	Dublin	Third convict voyage to NSW
Maria (1798 ship)	17 September 1818	Deptford	
Mariner (1807 ship)	11 October 1816	England	First convict voyage to NSW
Mariner	10 July 1825	Cork	Second convict voyage to NSW
Mariner	23 May 1827	Cork	Third convict voyage to NSW
Marquis Cornwallis (1789 ship)	12 February 1796	Cork	
Marquis of Hastings	3 January 1826	Portsmouth	First convict voyage to NSW
Marquis of Hastings	31 July 1827	Portsmouth	Second convict voyage to NSW
Marquis of Hastings	12 October 1828	London	Third convict voyage to NSW
Marquis of Hastings	20 August 1839	Hobart Town	Fourth convict voyage to NSW
Marquis of Huntley (1804 ship)	13 September 1826	Sheerness	First convict voyage to NSW
Marquis of Huntley	30 January 1828	Cork	Second convict voyage to NSW
Marquis of Huntley	21 August 1830	Sheerness	Third convict voyage to NSW
Marquis of Huntley	5 July 1835	The Downs	Fourth convict voyage to NSW
Marquis of Lansdown	12 January 1827	Calcutta	Two runaway convicts and four military prisoners from Calcutta
Marquis of Wellington (1801 ship)	27 January 1815	Portsmouth	
Martha (1810 ship)	24 December 1818	Cork	
Mary	6 June 1817	Calcutta	
Mary	29 May 1819	Calcutta	
Mary	4 June 1836	Calcutta	
Mary (1811 Bideford ship)	26 August 1819	Cork	
Mary	23 January 1822	Portsmouth	
Mary (1811 Ipswich ship)	18 October 1823	London	First convict voyage to NSW
Mary	5 January 1833	London	Second convict voyage to NSW
Mary	6 September 1835	London	Third convict voyage to NSW
Mary Ann (1772)	2 July 1791	England	
Mary Ann (1808 Batavia ship) (or Mary Anne)	19 January 1816		First convict voyage
Mary Anne (or Mary Ann)	20 May 1821	Portsmouth	Second convict voyage
Mary Anne	26 October 1835	Sheerness	
Mary Anne	10 November 1839	Woolwich	
Mary Ridgeway	19 April 1840	Adelaide	
Matilda (1790 ship)	1 August 1791	Portsmouth	Part of Third Fleet
Medina (1811 ship)	29 December 1823	Cork	
Medway	24 May 1822	Calcutta	
Mellish (1819 ship)	18 April 1829	Falmouth	
Mermaid	6 May 1830	Sheerness	
Midas	17 December 1825	London	
Midas	15 February 1825	Plymouth	
Middlesex	25 January 1840	Dublin	
Minerva (1773 ship)	11 January 1800	the Downs, & Cork	
Minerva (1805 ship)	30 April 1818	Ireland	First convict voyage to NSW
Minerva	17 December 1819	Cork	Second convict voyage to NSW
Minerva	16 December 1821	Sheerness	Third convict voyage to NSW
Minerva	19 November 1824	London	Fourth convict voyage to NSW
Minerva (1824 ship)	26 December 1839	Dublin	
Minorca (1799 ship)	14 December 1801	Spithead	
Minstrel (1811 ship)	25 October 1812	England	
Minstrel	22 August 1825	Portsmouth	Second convict voyage to NSW
Moffat	31 August 1836	Portsmouth	First convict voyage to NSW
Moffat	25 April 1838	Hobart	Second convict voyage to NSW
Morley (1811 ship)	10 April 1817	England	First convict voyage to NSW
Morley	7 November 1818	Downs	Second convict voyage to NSW
Morley	30 September 1820	London	Third convict voyage to NSW
Morley	3 March 1828	Dublin	Fourth convict voyage to NSW
Morley	3 December 1829	London	Fifth convict voyage to NSW

== N ==
Name	Date of arrival	Sailed from	Notes
Nautilus	9 February 1840	Dublin	
Neptune	28 June 1790	Portsmouth	Part of Second Fleet
Neptune	5 May 1818	The Downs	First convict voyage to NSW
Neptune	16 July 1820	The Downs	Second voyage to NSW
Neptune	2 January 1838	Dublin	
Neva	21 November 1833	Plymouth	First convict voyage to NSW
Neva	Wrecked in Bass Sraits with the loss of 224 lives	Cork	Second convict voyage to NSW
New York Packet	20 August 1835	Hobart Town	
Nile	14 December 1801	Spithead	
Nithsdale	12 May 1830	Sheerness	
Norfolk	18 August 1825	Portsmouth	First convict voyage to NSW
Norfolk	27 August 1829	Spithead	Second convict voyage to NSW
Norfolk	9 February 1832	Cork	Third convict voyage to NSW
Norfolk	30 December 1832	Madras & Mauritius	Fourth convict voyage to NSW
Norfolk	12 February 1837	Portsmouth	Fifth convict voyage to NSW
Northampton	18 June 1815	Portsmouth	
Numa	13 June 1834	Portsmouth	

== O ==
Name	Date of arrival	Sailed from	Notes
Ocean	30 January 1816	England	
Ocean	10 January 1818	Spithead	First convict voyage to NSW
Ocean	27 August 1823	Portsmouth	Second convict voyage to NSW

== P ==
Name	Date of arrival	Sailed from	Notes
Palambam	31 July 1831	Cork	
Parkfield	1 September 1839	Sheerness	
Parmelia	16 November 1832	Sheerness	First convict voyage to NSW
Parmelia	2 March 1834	Cork	Second convict voyage to NSW
Patriot	5 March 1835	Mauritius	First convict voyage to NSW
Patriot	1 February 1838	Madras & Mauritius	Second convict voyage to NSW
Pegasus	26 April 1833	Bombay	
Pekoe	6 November 1840	Dublin	
Perseus	4 August 1802	Spithead	
Perseverance	22 December 1838	Mauritius	
Phoenix	25 December 1826	Dublin	First convict voyage to NSW
Phoenix	14 July 1828	Spithead	Second convict voyage to NSW
Phoenix Union	14 April 1815	Calcutta	
Pilot	29 July 1817	Cork	
Pitt	14 February 1792	Yarmouth Roads	
Planter	15 October 1832	Portsmouth	First convict voyage to NSW
Planter	9 March 1839	Portland	Second convict voyage to NSW
Portland	11 September 1826		
Portland	26 March 1832	Portsmouth	First convict voyage to NSW
Portland	26 June 1833	Cork	Second convict voyage to NSW
Portsea	18 December 1838	Portsmouth	
Prentice	20 September 1834	Bombay & Mauritius	
Prince George	8 May 1837	Torbay	
Prince of Orange	12 February 1821	The Downs	
Prince Regent	21 January 1820	Cork	First convict voyage to NSW
Prince Regent	15 July 1824	Cork	Second convict voyage to NSW
Prince Regent	27 September 1827		Third convict voyage to NSW
Prince Regent	9 January 1821	Cork	
Princess Charlotte	6 August 1827	Woolwich	
Princess Royal	9 February 1823	England	First convict voyage to NSW
Princess Royal	9 May 1829	London	Second convict voyage to NSW
Princess Victoria	28 November 1834	Calcutta	
Providence	2 July 1811	Falmouth	
Providence	7 January 1822	England	
Pyramus	5 March 1832	Cork	First convict voyage to NSW
Pyramus	14 December	Cork	Second convict voyage to NSW

== Q ==
Name	Date of arrival	Sailed from	Notes
Queen	26 September 1791	Cork	Part of Third Fleet
Queen Charlotte	17 April 1829	Calcutta	First convict voyage to NSW - Transported 1 military convict
Queen Charlotte	26 April 1830	Mauritius	Second convict voyage to NSW - Transported 1 military convict

== R ==
Name	Date of arrival	Sailed from	Notes
Randolph	20 August 1849	London	
Recovery	18 December 1819	Woolwich	First convict voyage to New South Wales
Recovery	30 July 1823	Cork	Second convict voyage to New South Wales
Recovery	25 February 1836	London	Third convict voyage to New South Wales
Red Rover	28 April 1831	Hobart Town	
Regalia	5 August 1826	Dublin	
Regia	13 September 1838	Singapore	
Reliance	22 January 1829	Calcutta	First convict voyage to New South Wales
Reliance	27 March 1829	Île de France (Mauritius)	Second convict voyage to New South Wales
Research	10 January 1832	Calcutta & Mauritius	
Resource	21 May 1835	Hobart Town	
Rolla	12 May 1803	Cork	
Roslin Castle	29 June 1830	The Downs	First convict voyage to New South Wales
Roslin Castle	5 February 1833	Cork	Second convict voyage to New South Wales
Roslin Castle	15 September 1834	London	Third convict voyage to New South Wales
Roslin Castle	25 February 1836	Cork	Fourth convict voyage to New South Wales
Royal Admiral	7 October 1792	England	First convict voyage to New South Wales
Royal Admiral	20 November 1800	England	Second convict voyage to New South Wales
Royal Admiral	8 November 1830	Portsmouth	First convict voyage to New South Wales
Royal Admiral	26 October 1833	Dublin	Second convict voyage to New South Wales
Royal Admiral	22 January 1835	Dublin	Third convict voyage to New South Wales
Royal Charlotte	29 April 1825	Portsmouth	
Royal George	24 December 1828	Spithead	First convict voyage to New South Wales
Royal George	19 April 1835	Hobart Town	Second convict voyage to New South Wales
Royal Sovereign	19 January 1834	Dublin	First convict voyage to New South Wales
Royal Sovereign	12 December 1835	England	Second convict voyage to New South Wales
Ruby	28 September 1811	Calcutta	

== S ==
Name	Date of arrival	Sailed from	Notes
Salamander	21 August 1791	Plymouth	
Sarah	7 December 1829	London	
Sarah & Elizabeth	23 April 1837	Woolwich	
Scarborough	26 January 1788	Spithead	Part of First Fleet – First voyage to New South Wales
Scarborough	28 June 1790	Portsmouth	Part of Second Fleet – Second voyage to New South Wales
Sea Flower	30 April 1820	Calcutta	
Seppings	22 April 1840	Calcutta & Port Phillip	
Sesostris	21 March 1826	Portsmouth	
Shipley	24 April 1817	England	First convict voyage to New South Wales
Shipley	18 November 1818	Woolwich	Second convict voyage to New South Wales
Shipley	26 September 1820	The Downs	Third convict voyage to New South Wales
Shipley	11 March 1822	London	Fourth convict voyage to New South Wales
Sir Charles Forbes	25 December 1837	Dublin	
Sir Godfrey Webster	3 January 1826	Cork	
Sir John Byng	21 January 1842	Cape of Good Hope	
Sir William Bensley	10 March 1817	England	
Siren	9 April 1835		
Siren	14 October 1836	Bengal	
Somersetshire	16 October 1813	Spithead	
Sophia	17 January 1829	Dublin	
Southworth	9 March 1822	Cork	
Southworth	14 June 1832	Cork	
Sovereign	5 November 1795	The Downs	
Sovereign	3 August 1829	The Downs	
Sovereign	20 January 1833	Mauritius	
Sovereign	20 November 1834	Mauritius	
Speedy	15 April 1800	London	
Speke	16 November 1808	Falmouth	First convict voyage to NSW
Speke	18 May 1821	England	Second convict voyage to NSW
Speke	26 November 1826	Sheerness	Third convict voyage to NSW
Spence	21 June 1835		
St. Michael	29 November 1819	Calcutta	
St. Michael	30 October 1820	Calcutta	
St. Vincent	5 January 1837	Cork	
Stirling Castle	21 March 1836		
Strathfieldsay	19 December 1831		
Strathfieldsay	15 June 1836	Portsmouth	
Strathisla	16 May 1837	Calcutta	
Success	28 November 1826	Mauritius	
Sugar Cane	17 September 1793	Cork	
Surprize	26 June 1790	Portsmouth England	Part of Second Fleet
Surprize	25 November 1794	England	Second convict voyage to New South Wales
Surry (Surrey)	28 July 1814	England	First convict voyage to New South Wales
Surrey	20 December 1816	Cork	Second convict voyage to New South Wales
Surrey	4 March 1819	Sheerness	Third convict voyage to New South Wales
Surrey	4 March 1823	Portsmouth	Fourth convict voyage to New South Wales
Surrey	26 November 1831	Portsmouth	Fifth convict voyage to New South Wales
Surrey	17 August 1834	Plymouth	Sixth convict voyage to New South Wales
Surrey	17 May 1836	Cork	Seventh convict voyage to New South Wales
Surrey	13 July 1840	The Downs	Eighth convict voyage to New South Wales
Surrey	9 March 1833	Cork	
Susan	8 July 1834	London	First convict voyage to New South Wales
Susan	7 February 1836	Portsmouth	Second convict voyage to New South Wales
Susannah	7 September 1837	Mauritius	
Susannah	10 January 1839	Mauritius	
Swallow	23 October 1836	India	
Sydney Cove	18 June 1807	Falmouth	
Symmetry	28 May 1838	Mauritius	

== T ==
Name	Date of arrival	Sailed from	Notes
Tellicherry	15 February 1806	Cork	
Theresa	31 January 1839	Sheerness	
Thomas Harrison	9 June 1836	Cork	
Three Bees	6 May 1814	Falmouth	
Tottenham	14 October 1818	Spithead	
Tranmere	19 December 1829	London	No evidence that Tranmere carried convicts
Tyne	4 January 1819	Ireland	

== U ==
Name	Date of arrival	Sailed from	Notes
Union	14 April 1815	Madras	Transported 1 military convict

== V ==
Name	Date of arrival	Sailed from	Notes
Vittoria	17 January 1829	Devonport	

== W ==
Name	Date of arrival	Sailed from	Notes
Wanstead	9 January 1814	Spithead	
Warrior	20 November 1835	Calcutta	
Waterloo	9 July 1829	London	First convict voyage to NSW
Waterloo	30 April 1831	Dublin	Second convict voyage to NSW
Waterloo	3 August 1833	Sheerness	Third convict voyage to NSW
Waterloo	6 September 1836	London	Fourth convict voyage to NSW
Waterloo	8 February 1838	Sheerness	Fifth convict voyage to NSW
Wave	2 April 1832	Hobart Town	
Waverley	17 June 1839	Dublin	
Westbrook	12 February 1840	Mauritius	
Westmoreland	15 July 1835	London	First convict voyage to NSW
Westmoreland	22 August 1838	Dublin	Second convict voyage to NSW
Whitby	23 June 1839	Dublin	
William and Ann	28 August 1791	Plymouth	
William Jardine	11 April 1838	Dublin	
William Pitt	11 April 1806	Cork	
William Young	31 October 1829	Calcutta	
Woodbridge	26 February 1840	London	
Woodman	25 June 1823	Cork	

== Y ==
Name	Date of arrival	Sailed from	Notes
York	7 February 1831	Sheerness	

== See also ==
- Convict ships to Norfolk Island
- Convict ships to Tasmania
