= List of ships named Fanny =

A number of vessels have borne the name Fanny:

- Fanny was launched in 1774 and was renamed Vere (1781 ship) in 1781. She spent much of her career, under either name, as a West Indiaman. She was last listed in 1796.
- Fanny (1810 ship) was a merchant ship built on the River Thames, England in 1810. She was a West Indiaman but made one voyage transporting convicts from England to Australia. On her return she reverted to trading with the West Indies. She apparently burnt in 1817, but may have been salvaged. She was last listed in 1822.
- Fanny (1811 ship) was launched in Norway in 1807 under an unknown name and was captured around 1810 during the Gunboat War. She entered English records in 1811 as an armed merchantman that sailed between Liverpool and South America. On 19 April 1814, the American privateer schooner General Armstrong captured her, though shortly thereafter the British Royal Navy recaptured her. The insurance and marine salvage issues involved gave rise to three notable court cases. Fanny returned to the West Indies trade in 1815 under new owners. She was last listed in 1833.
- Fanny (1829 ship) was a merchant ship built at Calcutta, British India, in 1829. She made one voyage transporting convicts from England to Australia. She was still sailing in 1839.
- CSS Fanny was a small propeller-driven steam tug that the Confederate States Navy used to defend the sounds of northeastern North Carolina in the American Civil War. Originally armed as a gunboat and operated by the Union, she was captured in October 1861 by the Confederate Navy, and later lost at the Battle of Elizabeth City in February 1862. Due to being used as an observation balloon platform, Fanny is sometimes credited with being the first self-propelled aircraft carrier.<

== See also ==
- Fannie (pilot boat), built in 1860 for the New York City and Sandy Hook pilots
- Fanny Nicholson, an Australian sailing ship that sank in 1872
