= Forth (1826 ship) =

History

United Kingdom
- Name: Forth
- Builder: Robert Menzies & Sons, Leith
- Launched: 25 February 1826
- Fate: Foundered without a trace in 1835

General characteristics
- Tons burthen: 369 (bm)
- Propulsion: Sail

Forth was built in 1826 at Leith, Scotland. She made two voyages transporting convicts to New South Wales. After disembarking the convicts from her second voyage she sailed to Manila. She sailed from Manila in July 1835 and subsequently foundered without a trace.

== Career ==
Forth first appeared in Lloyd's List (LR), in the issue for 1826.

Year	Master	Owner	Trade	Source
1826	Robertson	Duncanson	Lieth–Merimac	LR

In 1813 the British East India Company (EIC) had lost its monopoly on the trade between India and Britain. British ships were then free to sail to India or the Indian Ocean under a licence from the EIC. In the late 1820s, Forth, master, sailed between Great Britain and Mauritius.

On her first convict voyage, under the command of J. Robertson and surgeon J. Cook, she sailed from Cork, Ireland on 3 June 1830, and arrived at Port Jackson on 12 October 1830. She had embarked 120 female convicts, all of whom survived the voyage. Forth left Port Jackson on 20 February 1831 bound for London with a cargo of merchandise. She arrived back at England on 13 July 1831.

Forth left London on 31 November 1831 and arrived in Launceston on 6 April 1832. She left Launceston 22 September and arrived back at Dover on 15 February 1833. In 1833–34 she made a second voyage to Van Diemen's Land, returning 24 July 1834.

In December 1834 it was reported in Tasmania that Captain Robertson had resigned the command of Forth to his first officer, Mr. Hutton. (Note: This and some other press items, are important in that they establish that it was this Forth, and not another convict transport Forth, that made the convict voyage below. Bateson, who has the most complete record of convict voyages, left the issue open. Lloyd's Register was undergoing difficulties at the time and had not been updated.)

During her second convict voyage, under the command of Henry Hutton and surgeon Thomas Robertson, she sailed from Cork, Ireland on 21 October 1834, and arrived at Port Jackson on 3 February 1835. She had embarked 196 male convicts, one of whom died on the voyage. One officer and 29 other ranks from the 50th Regiment of Foot, plus a junior officer from another regiment, provided the guard. Forth left Port Jackson on 28 February 1835 bound for Manila in ballast.

== Fate ==
Forth departed from Manila on 17 July 1835 for London. She disappeared without a trace and was presumed to have foundered with the loss of all hands.

== See also ==
- List of people who disappeared mysteriously at sea
