= Dart (1818 ship) =

History

United Kingdom
- Name: Dart
- Builder: Sunderland
- Launched: 1818
- Fate: Wrecked in March 1838

General characteristics
- Type: Brig
- Tons burthen: 108 (bm)
- Propulsion: Sail

Dart was a merchant ship built at Sunderland, England, in 1818. She made three voyages from Mauritius to Australia during which she also transported convicts. She was wrecked in 1838.

== Career ==
Captain George Griffin commanded Dart between 1833 and 1837 voyaging to Newcastle, Mauritius, Swan River, King George Sound, Moreton Bay, and Norfolk Island, with cargoes of coal, wool, wheat, barley, hides, and opossum skins.

She transported one convict, Daniel Mitchell, from Mauritius in 1831, and one or more convicts in 1833. Lastly, Dart left Mauritius with two female convicts and arrived in Sydney on 9 July 1834.

== Fate ==
While on a voyage for King George Sound, under the command of Captain Patton, sailing from Holdfast Bay, South Australia, on 29 March 1838, Dart went ashore on the Troubridge Shoals in Gulf St Vincent and was wrecked. There was no loss of life.
