= Maria (1798 ship) =

Great Britain
- Name: Maria
- Owner: Various
- Builder: John Smith, Gainsborough, Lincolnshire,
- Launched: 26 March 1798
- Fate: Last listed in 1833

General characteristics
- Tons burthen: 413, or 424, or 427, or 430 (bm)
- Armament: 1798: 4 × 6-pounder guns; later 6; 1815: 18 guns

Maria was launched in 1798 at Gainsborough, upstream from Hull. She spent the first half of her career or so as a West Indiaman. She then made two voyages to Australia transporting convicts. On the first of these voyages she transported women convicts to Port Jackson; on the second she transported men to Hobart. On her second voyage she returned via Bombay. She is last listed in 1833.

== Career ==
Convict voyage #1: (1818): Captain Henry Williams sailed from England on 3 April 1818. Maria sailed via Rio de Janeiro and arrived at Port Jackson on 17 September. She had embarked 126 women convicts and suffered two deaths en route. In October she departed for England.

Lloyd's Register shows her departing on 31 July 1820 for Bombay under a license from the EIC. There is a discrepancy between the name of the owner cited her and the name of the owner cited elsewhere in the volume (see Table below). Furthermore, Maria was first sailing to Hobart, and presumably from there sailing to Bombay before returning to England.

Convict voyage #2: (1820): Captain Harris Walker sailed from England on 28 July 1820 and arrived at Hobart on 1 December 1820. Maria had embarked 156 male convicts and she suffered no convict deaths en route.

Year	Master	Owner	Trade	Source & notes
1798	S. Stark; J. Foot	Smith & Co. Dale & Co.	Hull-St Petersburg; London–Jamaica	Lloyd's Register (LR)LR
1800	J. Foot	Dale & Co.	London–Jamaica	LR
1805	Gardner; McMasters	Moulton	London–Jamaica	LR
1810	Taylor	Moulton	London–Jamaica	LR
1815	J.Weller	Gale & Co.	London transport	LR; Gainsborough origin
1819	Williams	Soames & Co.	London–New South Wales	LR; thorough repair 1817
1821	Walker	Soames & Co.	London–New South Wales	LR
1825	H. Williams	J. Taylor	London–Quebec	LR
1830	W. Taylor	J. Taylor	Bristol-Liverpool	LR
1833	W. Taylor	J. Taylor	Bristol-Liverpool	LR; last listing
