= Henry (1826 ship) =

History

United Kingdom
- Name: Henry
- Builder: Edward Adams, Buckler's Hard
- Launched: 1826
- Fate: Lost in 1841

General characteristics
- Type: Barque
- Tons burthen: 252, or 260 (bm)
- Length: 96.1 feet (29.3 m)
- Beam: 23.94 feet (7.30 m)
- Draught: 5.9 feet (1.8 m)
- Propulsion: Sail

Henry was a merchant ship built in Buckler's Hard, England, in 1826. She made one voyage transporting convicts from Mauritius to Australia. She grounded off Fremantle in 1841 and was refloated, only to disappear after leaving Moulmein.

== Career ==
Henry' first appeared in Lloyd's Register ('LR) in 1826 with H.Bunney, master, Row, owner, and trade London–New south Wales.

Year	Master	Owner	Trade	Source
1830	H.Bunney	Rowe & Co.	London–Cape of Good Hope	LR
1835	H.Bunney	Bunney & Co.	London–Cape of Good Hope	LR

Under the command of Captain Bunney, she left Cape of Good Hope on 4 February 1838 with passengers and cargo and arrived at Sydney on 5 May. She left Port Jackson on 15 July bound for Mauritius. After having difficulty getting a cargo, Henry returned to Sydney with two convicts, passengers and cargo, arriving on 26 February 1839. Henry left Port Jackson on 10 May 1839 bound for London with passengers and cargo.

Year	Master	Owner	Trade	Source
1840	H.Bunney; Todd	Bunney & Co. Francis & Co.	London–Swan River; London–Sydney	LR; damages repaired 1840

Changing owners, she sailed under the command of Captain Todd, arriving at Perth on 20 April 1841.

== Fate ==
She went aground off Fremantle in 1841 and was refloated shortly after. Henry was last seen after leaving Moulmein in late 1841.
