= Gaillardon (1833 ship) =

History

United Kingdom
- Name: Gaillardon
- Port of registry: Calcutta
- Builder: J. Thomas, Howrah
- Launched: 8 May 1833
- Fate: Wrecked in February 1840

General characteristics
- Type: Barque
- Tons burthen: 391 (bm)
- Propulsion: Sail

Gaillardon was a merchant ship built in Calcutta, British India in 1833. She made three voyages transporting convicts from India to Australia and was wrecked upon the Coromandel Coast in 1840.

== Career ==
Under the command of James Rapson, she left Calcutta 20 December 1837 for Australia. She was the first ship to sail under the auspices of the Australian Association of Bengal (aka Bengal-Australia Association). She arrived at the Swan River Colony on 13 February 1838, bringing the first Indian hill coolies to arrive at the colony. A more detailed reckoning states that she landed 13 British men, one Chinese, and 37 lascars. She also landed Indian buffaloes, building supplies, 20 bags of rice, and barrels of ghee. She then sailed via King Georges's Sound and Adelaide, and reached Hobart Town on 22 March; she arrived at Sydney on 30 March 1838 with passengers, eighteen convicts, and sundry items.

On her second convict voyage under the command of James Rapson, she left Calcutta and sailed via Madras and Hobart Town. She arrived at Sydney on 27 December 1838 with passengers, one convict, and cargo.

For her third convict voyage again under the command of James Rapson, she left Calcutta on 16 June 1839. She reached Hobart Town on 11 October and arrived at Sydney on 22 October 1839, with passengers, sixteen convicts, and cargo.

== Fate ==
On her return voyage to India, Gaillardon was wrecked on 17 February 1840 on the northern of False Point at the mouth of the Hooghly River. Her crew was saved, however the mate pilot was lost. Another report puts the date of wrecking as 25 February. It further states that the hull was later sold for 13,000 rupees.
