= Janus (1810 ship) =

History

United Kingdom
- Name: Janus
- Namesake: Janus
- Owner: A&J.Gale (1820)
- Builder: New York
- Launched: 1810
- Fate: Last listed 1832

General characteristics
- Tons burthen: 308, (bm)
- Propulsion: Sails
- Sail plan: Full-rigged ship

Janus was launched at New York in 1810. Between 1819 and 1820 she transported female convicts to Port Jackson. Thereafter, she went on a whaling voyage. She later spent some years sailing between Falmouth and Quebec, and was last listed in 1832.

| Year | Master | Owner | Trade | Source |
|---|---|---|---|---|
| 1819 | T.Watson; Mowat | J. & A.Gale | London transport London–South Seas | LR |
| 1820 | Mowat | J.&A.Gale | London–South Seas | LR |

Captain Thomas J. Mowat sailed from the Cove of Cork on 18 December 1819 for Hobart. She stopped at Rio de Janeiro and then arrived at Port Jackson on 3 May 1820. she had embarked 105 female prisoners and disembarked 104. After James Creagh, the surgeon-superintendent, died on the voyage, Mowat sailed for Port Jackson. A later inquiry determined that a great deal of prostitution had occurred on board Janus and that Mowat and his officers had done nothing to prevent it. Among other passengers were the first two official Catholic chaplains allowed to minister to the colony, Fr Therry and Fr Conolly.

Janus commenced whaling on 25 June 1820. The whaler Indian arrived at New South Wales on 15 March and reported on the vessels that she knew to have been still at the fishery. One was Janus, with 600 barrels of whale oil. Janus returned to Sydney from the south seas on 29 July. She was still, or again, there at the end of September. On 15 February 1822 Janus was at 2°0′N 24°0′W, i.e., in the North Atlantic on a latitude that passes through Colombia and the Gulf of Guinea.

| Year | Master | Owner | Trade | Source &notes |
|---|---|---|---|---|
| 1823 | Mowat; Deighton | J. & A.Gale; Deighton | London–South Seas; London–Quebec | LR; repairs 1823 |

Janus was last listed in Lloyd's Register in 1832 with Richards, master, Vivian & Co., owner, and trade Falmouth-Quebec.
