= Elizabeth (1825 New Brunswick barque) =

Canadian-Built Barque

History

United Kingdom
- Name: Elizabeth
- Builder: Great Yarmouth
- Launched: 1825

General characteristics
- Type: Barque
- Tons burthen: 427 (bm)
- Propulsion: Sail

Elizabeth was a merchant ship built at New Brunswick, Nova Scotia in 1825. She made one voyage transporting convicts from Singapore to Australia.

== Career ==
The Register of Shipping for 1830 shows Elizabeth with Phillips, master, Brooks, owner, and trade London-Madras. This information continues unchanged to 1833.

While at Canton, Captain Phillips of Elizabeth died. Captain Anlaby replaced him. She left Canton on 19 January 1833 and sailed via Singapore where she picked up two convicts for transportation to Sydney. Elizabeth arrived in Sydney on 20 May 1833. Elizabeth departed Port Jackson bound for London.
