= England (1813 ship) =

History

United Kingdom
- Name: England
- Owner: Thomas Ward
- Builder: Buckle & Davies, Chepstow
- Launched: 14 July 1813
- Fate: Foundered 1843

General characteristics
- Tons burthen: 420, or 425, or 42529/94, or 426 (bm)
- Length: 116 ft 0 in (35.4 m)
- Beam: 28 ft 8 in (8.7 m)
- Propulsion: Sail
- Complement: 21 (at loss)
- Armament: 8 × 18-pounder guns ("of the New Construction")

England was built at Chepstow, Wales in 1813. She made three voyages transporting convicts from England to Australia. On the first she was under charter to the British East India Company (EIC) and, after delivering her convicts, sailed to Canton where she picked up a cargo for the EIC. She foundered in 1843 in the Channel while on a voyage to Sierra Leone.

== Career ==
England first appeared in Lloyd's Register (LR) in 1813 with E. Reay, master, T.Ward, owner, and trade London transport. Later she sailed to Jamaica.

In 1813 the EIC had lost its monopoly on the trade between India and Britain. British ships were then free to sail to India or the Indian Ocean under a license from the EIC.

On 16 December 1818 Captain Reay sailed England for Bombay. On 3 June 1820 England, Reay, master, was in the Downs when she and Mary, Draper, master, ran into each other. England was returning from Bengal and Mary was sailing for Sierra Leone. Both vessels put into Ramsgate for refitting.

On 18 February 1824, as England, Reay, master, was sailing from Bombay for England, she encountered a hurricane that cost her her rudder. She put into the Cape of Good Hope on 1 April to effect repairs.

Under the command of Captain John Reay and surgeon George Thomson, she left the Downs, England, on 6 May 1826, and arrived in Sydney on 18 September. She embarked 148 male convicts and had no convict deaths en route. A detachment of the 39th (Dorsetshire) Regiment of Foot provided the guard.

England departed Port Jackson 21 October bound for Canton. She arrived at Whampoa Anchorage on 31 December, and left on 8 February 1827. Her voyage ended on 25 June.

On her second convict voyage she sailed under the command of Captain James Blyth and surgeon Thomas Wilson. She left Sheerness, on 4 April 1832 and arrived in Hobart Town on 18 July. She embarked 200 male convicts and had two deaths en route.

On her third convict voyage, Captain Dalrymple Dowson and surgeon Jn. Love sailed from Cork on 12 June 1835. England arrived at Sydney on 28 September. She had embarked 230 convicts and suffered no losses on the voyage.

== Fate ==
Lloyd's Register for 1842 shows England with Lewis, master, T. Ward, owner, and trade London, changing to London–Sierra Leone. The entry also has the notation "Foundered".

She foundered on 15 January 1843 off Ostend on passage from London for Sierra Leone. She had left London 7 January for Africa. After leaving The Downs, she encountered a hurricane that caused her ballast to shift, which put her on her beam ends. She foundered in the North Sea 3 leagues (9 nautical miles (17 km)) off Ostend, West Flanders, Belgium. A Dutch pilot boat rescued her 21 crew.
