= Camden (1799 ship) =

History

Great Britain
- Name: Camden
- Owner: 1799: Lushington & Co.; 1836: J. Marshall
- Builder: Randall & Brent, Rotherhithe, River Thames
- Launched: 19 August 1799
- Fate: Wrecked August 1836

General characteristics
- Tons burthen: 298, or 309, or 423, or 429, or 432, or 4329/94 or 450 (bm)
- Propulsion: Sail
- Armament: 1800:8 × 18-pounder carronades; 1809:2 × 4-pounder guns + 8 × 18-pounder carronades; 1810:2 × 4-pounder guns + 12 × 18-pounder carronades

Camden was a merchant ship built upon the River Thames in 1799 as a West Indiaman. Between 1832 and 1833 she made two voyages transporting convicts from England to Australia. She was wrecked in 1836.

== Career ==
Camden began her career as a West Indiaman. She entered Lloyd's Register (LR) in 1799.

Year	Master	Owner	Trade	Source & notes
1799	H.Meek	Lushington	London–Grenada	LR
1801	H.Meek; R.Hill	Lushington; Wederburn	London–Grenada; London–Jamaica	LR
1809	Tyler	Wederburn	London–Grenada; London–Jamaica	LR
1812	Tyler; Billinghurst	Wederburn	London–Jamaica	LR
1814	Billinghurst	Captain & Co.	London–Antigua	LR
1816	Billinghurst	Captain & Co.	London–Antigua	LR; copper repaired 1816, sev. repair 1816, topsides 1816
1821	Billinghurst; Morton	Billinghurst	London–Antigua	LR; large repair 1816
1823	Morton; Bollinbroke	Manning	London–Antigua	LR; large repair 1816 & 1823
1824	Billinghurst	Billinghurst	London–Antigua	LR; large repair 1816 & 1823
1826	Billinghurst; Tate	Billinghurst	London–Antigua	LR; large repair 1823
1831	Noyes	J.Marshall	London–Calcutta	LR; rebuilt 1822
1832	Fulcher; Clay	J.Marshall	London–New South Wales	LR; large repair 1831

=== First convict voyage (1831) ===
On her first convict voyage, under the command of William Fulcher and surgeon David Boyter, she departed London on 28 March 1831 and arrived in Sydney, New South Wales, on 25 July. She embarked 198 male convicts and had no convict deaths en route.

=== Second convict voyage (1832–1833) ===
On her second convict voyage, under the command of George Clayton and surgeon Joseph Steret, she departed Sheerness on 22 September 1832 and arrived in Sydney on 18 February 1833. She embarked 200 male convicts, two of whom died en route.

Year	Master	Owner	Trade	Source & notes
1834	G.Clayton; M'Kinnon	J.Marshall	Gls (Goole?)–London	LR;

Lloyd's Register for 1836 showed Camden's master as Ryan, and her trade as London—Sydney. Captain Valentine Ryan sailed from the Downs on 22 February 1836 and arrived at Sydney on 2 June. Camden was carrying passengers.

== Fate ==
Camden was wrecked in the Strait of Madura, Dutch East Indies. She was on a voyage from Sydney to Soarabaga when she wrecked on 10 August 1836. Her crew were rescued.
