= Diana (1824 ship) =

Merchant ship built at Whitby, England in 1824

History

United Kingdom
- Name: Diana
- Owner: 1824:Robt. and John Braithwaite and J. Frankland
- Builder: T.Broderick, Whitby
- Launched: 1824
- Fate: Last listed 1856

General characteristics
- Tons burthen: 320, or 321 (bm)
- Propulsion: Sail

Diana was a merchant ship built at Whitby, England, in 1824. She made a number of voyages between England, India and Quebec with cargo and undertook one voyage transporting convicts to New South Wales. She was last listed in 1856.

== Career ==
Diana first appeared in Lloyd's Register (LR) in 1824 with Braithwaite as owner and master, and trade London–Malta.

| Year | Master | Owner | Trade | Source & notes |
|---|---|---|---|---|
| 1825 | Braithwaite | Braithwaite | London–Malta | LR |
| 1830 | Braithwaite | Braithwaite | Liverpool–Quebec | LR |

Under the command of George Braithwaite and surgeon James Ellis, she sailed from Woolwich, England on 11 December 1832, stopped at Cape Colony and arrived at Sydney on 26 May 1833. She embarked 100 female convicts and had no deaths en route. While at the Cape she picked up the convict Mina Magerman for transportation. A number of women and children passengers accompanied the voyage.

Diana departed Port Jackson on 3 August 1833, bound for Batavia in ballast but with passengers.

| Year | Master | Owner | Trade | Source & notes |
|---|---|---|---|---|
| 1834 | Braithwaite; Traill | Braithwaite | London–Quebec | LR; small repairs 1833 |
| 1840 | Lane | Braithwaite | London–Mauritius | LR; small repair 1835 & 1837, & thorough repair 1837 |
| 1845 | J.Raw | Braithwaite | Whitby–Naples; Whitby–Malta | LR; thorough repair 1837, & small repairs 1844 & 1846 |

Diana changed her registry to Hull in 1851.

| Year | Master | Owner | Trade | Source & notes |
|---|---|---|---|---|
| 1851 | J.Toogood | Brown & Co. | Hull–Quebec | LR; small repairs 1846, 1847, and 1851 |
| 1856 | Storer | F.Story | Hartpool–America | LR; homeport Hartlepool; small repairs 1851 and 1852, and damages repaired 1855 |
