= Earl St. Vincent (1800 ship) =

Merchant ship built at Topsham, England in 1800

History

Great Britain
- Name: Earl St. Vincent
- Namesake: John Jervis, 1st Earl of St Vincent
- Owner: T. Hayman; Buckle
- Builder: Robert Davy, Topsham
- Launched: 29 September 1800
- Fate: Last listed 1833

General characteristics
- Tons burthen: 412, or 423, or 42313/94 or 432 (bm)
- Length: 112 ft 6 in (34.3 m) (keel)
- Beam: 28 ft 9 in (8.8 m)
- Propulsion: Sail

Earl St. Vincent was a merchant ship built at Topsham, England in 1800. Between 1818 and 1823 she made three voyages transporting convicts from England and Ireland to Australia.

== Career ==
Earl St Vincent enters Lloyd's Register in 1800 with Gottberry, master.

Under the command of Samuel Simpson and surgeon John Johnson, she left Cork, Ireland on 7 August 1818, and arrived in Sydney on 16 December 1818. She embarked 160 male convicts and had three deaths en route. Earl St. Vincent departed Port Jackson on 2 February 1819, bound for Calcutta.

On her second convict voyage under the command of Samuel Simpson and surgeon Patrick Hill, she left Portsmouth, England on 12 April 1820, and arrived in Sydney on 16 August. She embarked 160 male convicts and no deaths en route. Earl St. Vincent departed Port Jackson on 21 September 1820, bound for Calcutta.

Under the command of Peter Reeves and surgeon Robert Tainsh on her third convict voyage, she left Cork, Ireland on 29 April and arrived in Sydney on 9 September 1823. She embarked 157 male convicts and one convict died during the voyage. Earl St. Vincent departed Port Jackson on 16 October 1823, bound for Batavia.

Year	Master	Owner	Trade
1825	Reeves	Buckle & Co.	London — New South Wales
1830	Middleton	Mount & Co.	London — Sierra Leone
1833	Middleton	Mount & Co.	Liverpool — Saint Petersburg
