= Princess Charlotte (1813 Sunderland ship) =

East Indiaman and convict transport that foundered in 1828

History

United Kingdom
- Name: Princess Charlotte
- Builder: Hylton Ferry, Sunderland
- Launched: 6 July 1813
- Fate: Foundered 23 September 1828

General characteristics
- Tons burthen: 400, or 40051/94, or 401, or 405, or 406 (bm)
- Length: 103 ft 0 in (31.4 m)
- Beam: 30 ft 1 in (9.2 m)
- Armament: 12 × 9 pdr (4.1 kg) carronades

Princess Charlotte was a ship launched in Sunderland, England, in 1813. She immediately started trading with the Indian Ocean and India under a license from the British East India Company (EIC). She made one voyage for the EIC, and she made two voyages transporting convicts to Australia, one to Hobart Town, Van Diemen's Land, and one to Port Jackson, New South Wales. She foundered in 1828 in the Bay of Bengal.

== Career ==
In 1813 the EIC had lost its monopoly on the trade between India and Britain. British ships were then free to sail to India or the Indian Ocean under a license from the EIC.

Year	Master	Owner	Trade	Source
1814			London	LR
1814	Turnbull	Mitchell & Co.	London–Île de France	Register of Shipping (RS)
1816	Turnbull; Vaughn	Mitchell & Co. [John W.] Buckle & Co.	London–FSGeo	LR
1820	R.Vaughn	Buckle & Co.	London–India	LR

EIC voyage (1819–1820): Captain William Vaughn sailed from the Downs on 12 July 1819, bound for Bengal. Princess Charlotte was at São Tiago on 22 August and arrived at Calcutta on 18 November. Homeward bound, she was at Culpee on 20 March 1820 and the Cape on 8 June. She reached Saint Helena on 25 June, and arrived back at the Downs on 14 August.

Year	Master	Owner	Trade	Source
1825	Blythe	Buckle & Co.	London–Van Diemen's Land	LR

Convict voyage (1824): On 15 July 1824 Captain Joseph Blyth sailed from London, bound for Hobart Town. Princess Charlotte stopped at Falmouth on 16 July and Rio de Janeiro on 7 September,. and arrived at Hobart Town on 8 November. She had embarked 140 male convicts, none of whom died on the voyage. Thirty-nine officers and men from the 40th Regiment of Foot provided the guard.

Year	Master	Owner	Trade	Source
1828	Stephenson	Howden & Co.	London–New South Wales	LR

Convict voyage (1827): Princess Charlotte, Captain Daniel Stephenson, departed Woolwich on 31 March 1827 and anchored in the Downs on 3 April. Many of the women became sea sick on the way to the Downs. Princess Charlotte arrived in Port Jackson on 6 August. She had embarked 80 female convicts, one of whom died on the journey.

== Fate ==
Princess Charlotte, Stephenson, master, foundered on 23 September 1828 in the Bay of Bengal as she was sailing from Calcutta to Mauritius and London. Her crew was saved.
