= Globe (1810 ship) =

History

United Kingdom
- Name: Globe
- Owner: 1812:T. Taylor; 1816:Newhandling; 1817:J. Robertson
- Builder: G. W. Porrett, Scarborough
- Launched: 27 June 1810
- Fate: Wrecked December 1824

General characteristics
- Tons burthen: 360, or 361, or 362, or 363, or 36339/94, or 370 (bm)
- Propulsion: Sail
- Armament: 8 × 18-pounder + 2 × 9-pounder carronades

Globe was launched in 1810. Privateers captured and released her in 1817, and in 1818-1819 she transported convicts to New South Wales. She was wrecked in 1824.

== Career ==
Globe first appeared in the Register of Shipping in 1812 with Robinson, master, Taylor, owner, and trade London transport. The Register of Shipping for 1816 showed her master changing to G. Ocley, her owner to Newhandling, and her trade to London—Quebec. Globe, Oxley, master, was reported to have been at 42°47′N 11°30′W on 29 May 1816 while on her way from Liverpool to Quebec.

Globe was on her way from London and Madeira to Jamaica when, on 28 May 1817, two 18-gun privateers from Buenos Aires, via Cadiz, detained her for several hours before releasing her. They wished to purchase provisions but Captain Blyth refused to sell them any. In 1818 Globe underwent a large repair.

The Register of Shipping for 1818 showed Globe's master as Blythe, her owner as Robinson, and her trade changing from London—Jamaica to London—New South Wales.

Captain Joseph Blyth left Portsmouth on 9 September 1818, bound for Port Jackson. Globe arrived there on 8 January 1819. She had embarked 140 male convicts, one of whom died en route. Lieutenant O'Brien, of the 48th Regiment of Foot, and 30 men from the 17th and 48th Regiments of Foot provided the guard.

After transporting convicts to Australia, Globe proceeded to trade with India under license from the British East India Company. Lloyd's List reported on 21 August 1821 that Globe, Cuzens, master, had arrived in the Thames from Bengal and Saint Helena. Between end-April and early May she had experienced 13 days of heavy gale while off the Cape of Good Hope. She was next reported to have been at the Equator on 9 February while sailing to Mauritius.

The Register of Shipping for 1824 showed Globe's master changing from Couzens to Brydon, and her trade from London—Ceylon to London—Quebec.

== Fate ==
In November 1824 Globe was wrecked on Nickman's Ground, off Dagerort, Russia with the loss of Brydon, who drowned. She was on a voyage from St. Petersburg, Russia, to London. The vessel parted and her cargo of tallow and part of the wreck drifted towards shore. Of the cargo, 125 barrels of tallow were saved in good condition, 25 were half-filled, and 200-250 were mixed with sand. Upward of 3000 deals (sawn coniferous wood) were saved. The copper she was carrying went down with her.
