= Elizabeth (1825 Yarmouth brig) =

History

United Kingdom
- Name: Elizabeth
- Builder: Great Yarmouth
- Launched: 1825, or 1826

General characteristics
- Type: Brig
- Tons burthen: 223, or 224 or 236 (bm)
- Propulsion: Sail

Elizabeth was a merchant ship built at Great Yarmouth, England in 1825. She made one voyage transporting convicts from Hobart Town to Sydney, Australia.

== Career ==
The Register of Shipping for 1830 shows Elizabeth with Swan, master, Ridley, owner, and trade Plymouth—New South Wales.

Under the command of Captain Swan, she left Hobart Town on 15 December 1830, with cargo, passengers and twelve convicts. She arrived in Sydney on 20 December 1830. Elizabeth departed Port Jackson bound for Launceston and London.
