= Amboyna (1807 ship) =

History

United Kingdom
- Name: Amboyna
- Namesake: Ambon Island
- Builder: Rangoon
- Launched: 1807
- Fate: Wrecked in 1825

General characteristics
- Type: Brig
- Tons burthen: 232 ton (bm)
- Propulsion: Sail

Amboyna was a 232-ton merchant ship built at Rangoon, British Burma in 1807. She made several voyages to Australia with cargo from the East Indies and China. She also carried some military convicts to Australia. She was wrecked in the China Seas in 1825.

== Design ==
Amboyna was built at Rangoon, British Burma. She was rebuilt in 1813 on the Hooghly River, British India.

== Career ==
On 26 June 1825, Amboyna, David Wilson, master, sailed from Sydney, bound for Calcutta.

Amboyna was wrecked in the China Seas in 1825, while on a voyage to China from Australia and under the command of David Wilson.
