= Earl Grey (1835 ship) =

History

United Kingdom
- Name: Earl Grey
- Builder: Newcastle upon Tyne
- Launched: 1835

General characteristics
- Tons burthen: 571 (bm)
- Propulsion: Sail

Earl Grey was a merchant ship built in Newcastle upon Tyne, England in 1835. She made four voyages transporting convicts from Great Britain to Australia.

== Career ==
Under the command of James Talbert and surgeon William Evans, she left Cork, Ireland on 27 August 1836, with 297 male convicts. She arrived in Sydney on 31 December 1836 and had nine deaths en route.

On her second convict voyage under the command of James Talbert and surgeon Alex Nisbet, she left Portsmouth, England on 8 August 1838, with 290 male convicts. She arrived in Sydney on 21 November and had two deaths en route.

Under the command of Alexander Moleston and surgeon Colin Browning on her third convict voyage, she left Plymouth, England on 5 October 1842 with 264 male convicts. She arrived in Hobart Town on 14 January 1843, three convicts died during the voyage.

In 1848 it transported to Sydney free immigrants including the first shipment of female Irish famine orphans.

On her fourth convict voyage under the command of Henry Landsdowne and surgeon John Ferrier, she left Dublin, Ireland on 17 December 1849 with 240 female convicts. She arrived in Hobart on 9 May 1850 and had four deaths en route.
