= Prince George (1830 ship) =

History

United Kingdom
- Name: Prince George
- Builder: John Green, ship builder, Bristol
- Launched: 1830
- Fate: Last listed 1847

General characteristics
- Tons burthen: 482, or 48217/94, or 490 (bm)
- Length: 118 ft (36 m)
- Beam: 30 ft 3 in (9.22 m)
- Notes: Three masts & two decks

Prince George was launched in 1830 at Bristol. In 1837 she made one voyage transporting convicts to New South Wales, and one the next year transporting settlers to South Australia. She was last listed in 1847.

== Career ==
Prince George first appeared in Lloyd's Register (LR) in 1830. She was re-registered in London on 12 December 1833.

Year	Master	Owner	Trade	Source & notes
1830	Simkin (Thomas Allen Simkin)	Green (John Green)	Bristol–Barbados	LR
1836	T.Shaw (Francis Shaw)	Francis; Somes	London–Bombay; London	LR; small repairs 1836

Convict transport: Captain Adolphus Colton sailed from Torbay on 27 January 1837. Prince George arrived at Sydney on 8 May. She had embarked 250 male convicts, six of whom died on the voyage.

Immigrant transport: Prince George sailed from London on 8 September 1838, bound for South Australia. She arrived at Port Adelaide on 26 December 1838. She brought 199 passengers (126 adults and 73 children).

Year	Master	Owner	Trade	Source & notes
1839	J.Young	Waddell & Co.	London–South Australia; London transport	LR; small repairs 1836 & damages repaired 1838
1840	J.Young; Grant		London transport	LR; small repairs 1836 & damages repaired 1838
1845	Marshall; W.Tate	J.Somes; Bell & Co.	London; Shields–Mediterranean	LR; Homeport London, changing to South Shields; small repairs 1836 & 1845, damages repaired 1838

== Fate ==
Prince George was last listed in Lloyd's Register in 1847 with W.Tate, master, Bell & Co., owner, and trade Shields–Mediterranean.
