= Royal Sovereign (1829 ship) =

Ship, built 1829

History

United Kingdom
- Name: Royal Sovereign
- Builder: Whitby
- Launched: 1829

General characteristics
- Type: Barque
- Tons burthen: 336 ton (bm)
- Propulsion: Sail

Royal Sovereign was a 336-ton merchant ship built at Whitby, England in 1829. She made one voyage transporting convicts from England to Australia and one voyage from Ireland to Australia.

== Career ==
On her first convict voyage, under the command of John Henderson and surgeon Peter Leonard, she departed Dublin, Ireland on 6 September 1833, with 170 male convicts. She arrived in Sydney on 19 January 1834. There were two convict deaths en route. The second convict voyage, under the command of John Moncrief and surgeon Francis Logan, she departed England on 29 July 1835 with 170 male convicts. She arrived in Sydney on 12 December 1835 and had one convict death en route.
