= Elizabeth (1805 ship) =

History

United Kingdom
- Name: Elizabeth
- Builder: Dartmouth
- Launched: 1805
- Fate: Condemned 1838.

General characteristics
- Type: Barque
- Tons burthen: 392 (bm)
- Propulsion: Sail

Elizabeth was a merchant ship built at Dartmouth, England in 1805. She made one voyage in 1836, transporting convicts from England to Australia. She was condemned in 1838.

== Career ==
Elizabeth is listed in the 1836 volume of Lloyd's Register with Austin, master, Somes, owner, and trade London—South Seas, having undergone some repairs in 1836. The designation of her trade as London—South Seas has resulted in some conflation of this Elizabeth with an Elizabeth, of 416 tons (bm), launched at Topsham in 1805, that was whaling in the South Seas whale fishery between 1835 and 1841.

Under the command of John Austin and surgeon Robert Espie, she left London, England on 26 June 1836, arrived in Sydney on 12 October 1836. She had embarked 161 female convicts and had no convict deaths en route. Elizabeth departed Port Jackson on 21 November 1836 bound for Valparaíso, Chile with passengers and sundries.

Lloyd's List reported on 13 July 1837 that Elizabeth, Austin, master, had arrived off Newhaven. She is last listed in the 1839 volume of Lloyd's Register, still with Austin, master and J. Somes, owner. However, now her trade is simply "London transport". More critically, there is a notation "condemned" by her name.
