= Marquis of Huntley (1804 ship) =

History

United Kingdom
- Name: Marquis of Huntley
- Builder: Duthie, Aberdeen
- Launched: 1804
- Fate: Last listed in 1843; possibly wrecked 24 June 1844

General characteristics
- Tons burthen: 547, or 560, or 564, or 56457/94 (bm)
- Length: 128 ft 4 in (39.1 m)
- Beam: 31 ft 11 in (9.7 m)
- Armament: 6 × 6-pounder + 2 × 4-pounder guns (1813)
- Notes: Made in part of old materials

Marquis of Huntley was launched at Aberdeen in 1804 as a West Indiaman. She disappeared from the registers between 1814 and 1824. She then made four voyages transporting convicts to New South Wales. She was a transport for much of her career, carrying cargoes and troops for the British government. She suffered a maritime incident in November 1834. She was last listed in 1843, possibly having been wrecked 24 June 1844.

== Career ==
Marquis of Huntley first appeared in Lloyd's Register (LR) in 1804.

| Year | Master | Owner | Trade | Source & notes |
|---|---|---|---|---|
| 1804 | Hart | Latham & Co. | London–Nevis | LR |
| 1807 | Hart | Fraser & Co. | London–Nevis | LR |
| 1813 | J.Hart | Frazer and Co. | London–Nevis | LR & Register of Shipping |

Marquis of Huntley disappeared from both LR and the Register of Shipping, after the 1813 issues, and did not reappear until 1824.

| Year | Master | Owner | Trade | Source & notes |
|---|---|---|---|---|
| 1824 | A.Jameson | Somes | London transport | LR; thorough repair 1824 |
| 1825 | A.Jameson | Somes | Cowes transport | LR; thorough repair 1824 |
| 1826 | A.Jameson; Ascough | J.Somes | Cowes transport | LR; thorough repair 1824 |

1st convict voyage (1826): Captain William Ascough departed Sheerness on 16 May 1826 and arrived in Sydney on 13 September. Marquis of Huntley had embarked 200 male convicts and suffered two convict deaths en route. She sailed from New South Wales on 11 February 1827 and from Bahia on 5 May, and arrived in Portsmouth in mid-June. She carried a cargo that included cedar, blue gum plats, tree nails, Zealand spars, spokes, oil, wool, salted hides, and three half-pipes of colonial wine.

2nd convict voyage (1827–1828): Captain Ascough departed Cork, Ireland on 27 September 1827 and arrived in Sydney on 30 January 1828. Marquis of Huntley had embarked 160 male convicts and had suffered no convict deaths en route. She was off Portsmouth in mid-June 1829, having sailed from Mauritius on 19 March.

| Year | Master | Owner | Trade | Source & notes |
|---|---|---|---|---|
| 1829 | Ascough | J.Somes | Cork transport | LR; thorough repair 1824 |

3rd convict voyage (1830): Captain Ascough had departed Sheerness on 9 April 1830 and arrived in Sydney on 21 August. Marquis of Huntley had embarked 228 male convicts and had suffered one convict death en route. She left on 24 December and was off Portsmouth on 23 May.

| Year | Master | Owner | Trade | Source & notes |
|---|---|---|---|---|
| 1831 | Ascough; J.Austin | J.Somes | London transport | LR; thorough repair 1824, large repair 1829, & damages repaired 1830 |
| 1833 | Austin; Mollison | Somes | London–Belleisle; London transport | Register of Shipping; almost rebuilt 1824, large repair 1829, & small repairs 1833 |

By one account the ex-Emperor of Brazil, Dom Pedro, Duke of Braganza, hired Marquis of Huntley on 26 June 1832. The Portuguese converted her into the warship Madeira, of 10 guns, with a crew of 50. They returned her to J.Somes in 1834, who returned her to her original name. (Note: The most complete listing of Portuguese warships of the period has no vessel named Madeira. Although the listing shows various vessels acquired from England during this period, none appears to be Marquis of Huntley.)

However, a list of vessels arriving at Quebec shows Marquis of Huntley, arriving at Quebec in ballast on 14 September 1832, having left Oporto on 5 August.

A source stated that Marquis of Huntley's registration was cancelled on 23 July 1834, demolition having been completed, This is incorrect as she continued to sail for about a decade.

| Year | Master | Owner | Trade | Source & notes |
|---|---|---|---|---|
| 1834 | Mollison | J.Somes | London transport | LR; small repairs 1835 |

On 10 November 1834 Marquis of Huntley, of 564 tons burthen and 33 crew, ran aground on the Middle Sand. The British government had chartered her to carry ordnance and admiralty stores, and 11 invalids from Leith to London. Eight smacks came out from Colchester and helped her to get off. The issue of an appropriate salvage resulted in a court case. The owners put a value of £1500 on their vessel, but had insured her for £3000 and stated that her sale value was £2500. The owners had also just chartered Marquis of Huntley to the government for £4000 a year to carry convicts to New South Wales. The owners offered £400 to the salvors, three of whom had died when their boat overturned during salvage efforts. The judge awarded the salvors £1300, £150 for each of the smacks and £100 to be apportioned to the families of the three men who had drowned.

4th convict voyage (1835): Captain A.L.Molison departed the Downs on 27 March 1835 and arrived in Sydney on 5 July. Marquis of Huntley had embarked 320 male convicts and had suffered one convict death en route.

| Year | Master | Owner | Trade | Source & notes |
|---|---|---|---|---|
| 1836 | Mollison; Motley | J.Somes; Chapman | London transport London–Quebec; London–Malta | LR; small repairs 1835 |
| 1843 | Motley | Chapman | London–Quebec | LR; small repairs 1835 |

== Fate ==
Marquis of Huntley was last listed in LR in 1843. She may have been the vessel that was wrecked on 24 June 1844 on "Briton Island" or "Brier Island". Her crew were rescued. She was on a voyage from Quebec City to Cork with cargo of deals.
