= Grenada (1810 ship) =

Merchant ship and convict transport (1810–1827)

History

United Kingdom
- Name: Grenada
- Owner: J. Blackett & Co.
- Builder: Thomas Steemson, Paull, Kingston upon Hull
- Launched: 15 September 1810
- Fate: Condemned 1827

General characteristics
- Type: Barque
- Tons burthen: 408, or 413 (bm)
- Propulsion: Sail
- Armament: 2 × 6-pounder guns, later 6

Grenada was a merchant ship built at Kingston upon Hull, England in 1810. She made four voyages transporting convicts from England to Australia. In 1827, while returning to England from Australia via Batavia, she arrived at Mauritius in a damaged state and was condemned.

== Career ==
Grenada appears in the Register of Shipping for 1811 with T. Curzens, master, J. Blackett, owner, and trade Hull–Grenada. Grenada was sheathed in copper in 1816.

Grenada appears in the Register of Shipping for 1820 with A. Donald, master, Blackett & Son, owner, and trade London–Bombay.

=== First convict voyage ===
Under the command of Andrew Donald and surgeon Emanuel Lazzaretto, she left Sheerness, England on 8 May 1819 with 152 male convicts, passengers, and cargo. She arrived at Sydney on 21 October. No convicts died on the voyage. Grenada sailed from Port Jackson on 27 December, bound for Calcutta.

=== Second convict voyage ===
Grenada left Portsmouth, England under the command of Andrew Donald and surgeon Peter Cunningham on 9 May 1821 with 152 male convicts, passengers, and cargo. She arrived at Sydney on 16 September. No convicts died on the voyage. She left Port Jackson in December with cargo and passengers for Batavia.

In 1823 Grenada, Anderson, master, sailed for Calcutta under a license from the British East India Company (EIC).

=== Third convict voyage ===
Under the command of Alexander Anderson and surgeon Peter Cunningham, she left London, England on 2 October 1824 with 81 female convicts, passengers, and cargo. She arrived at Sydney on 23 January 1825. No convicts died on the voyage. Grenada sailed from Port Jackson on 27 March, bound for Madras.

=== Fourth convict voyage ===
Grenada left Portsmouth, England under the command of John Tracy and surgeon Alexander Nisbet on 8 September 1826 with 88 female convicts, passengers, and cargo. She arrived at Hobart Town on 9 January 1827. Four convicts, and two children died on the voyage. She left Hobart Town on 13 January with cargo and passengers for Sydney, arriving on 23 January. Grenada left Port Jackson on 1 March with cargo and passengers for Batavia.

== Fate ==
Grenada arrived at Mauritius from Batavia in a damaged state. She was condemned there.
