= Westmoreland (1832 ship) =

History

United Kingdom
- Name: Westmoreland
- Builder: Lynn
- Launched: 1832
- Fate: Last listed in 1847

General characteristics
- Tons burthen: 405 (bm)
- Propulsion: Sail

Westmoreland was built in 1832 at Lynn. She made three voyages transporting convicts to New South Wales. She was last listed in 1847.

== Career ==
First convict voyage (1835): Captain John Brigstock, with surgeon Charles Inches, sailed from London, England on 9 March 1835, and arrived at Port Jackson on 15 July 1835. Westmoreland had embarked 220 male convicts and landed 218; two convicts died on the voyage.

Westmoreland left Port Jackson on 20 August 1835 bound for Portland Bay with a cargo of oil and stores.

Second convict voyage (1836): Captain Brigstock, with surgeon J. Ellis, sailed from Woolwich, England on 12 August 1836, arrived at Hobart Town on 3 December 1836. Westmoreland had embarked 155 female convicts; one convict died on the voyage.

Westmoreland left Hobart Town on 10 January 1837 bound for Launcestown with a cargo of stores.

Third convict voyage (1838): Captain Brigstock, with surgeon George McLure, sailed from Dublin, Ireland on 27 April 1838, and arrived at Port Jackson on 22 August 1838. Westmoreland had embarked 254 male convicts; four convicts died on the voyage.

Westmoreland left Port Jackson on 10 January 1837 bound for Launcestown with a cargo of stores.

== Fate ==
Westmoreland was last listed in Lloyd's Register in 1847 with Appleton, master, Bottomly, owner, and trade Shields–India.
