= Experiment (1802 ship) =

History

United States
- Launched: 1802, Georgia, United States of America (Note: The Register of Shipping for 1818 carries Experiment as a Spanish prize, and gives no launch year.)
- Fate: Sold c.1806

United Kingdom
- Name: Experiment
- Owner: 1806:Peter Evret Mestears
- Acquired: 1806
- Fate: Last listed in 1818

General characteristics
- Tons burthen: 146, or 186 (bm)
- Propulsion: Sail
- Complement: 12
- Armament: 8 guns

Experiment was built in 1802 in Georgia, United States of America. She came into British ownership circa 1806. She made one voyage to New South Wales in 1809–1810 transporting female convicts. She was last listed in 1818.

== Career ==
Experiment entered Lloyd's Register (LR) in 1806 with W.Bisset, master, Maester, owner, and trade London–Cape of Good Hope. LR for 1808 showed Experiment with W.Bisset, master, changing to J.Dodds, Maester, owner, and trade London–Cape of Good Hope.

Convict transport (1809–10): Under the command of Joseph Dodds (or Dodd), she sailed from Cork, Ireland on 21 January 1809, and arrived at Port Jackson on 25 June 1809. She embarked 60 female convicts, all of whom survived the voyage.

Experiment left Port Jackson on 11 July bound for Bengal, where she was to purchase provisions for the Colony in New South Wales. She returned to Port Jackson on 17 January 1810 with a cargo of wheat and rice. She then left for England on 17 March. On 28 June she was at Rio de Janeiro.

LR for 1811 showed Experiment as being at Cork, still with Dodds, master, and Maester, owner.

== Fate ==
Experiment was last listed in the Register of Shipping in 1818 with J. Dodds, master, Mestaers, owner, and sailing as a London-based transport.
