= Enchantress (1825 ship) =

Ship launched 1825, wrecked 1835

History

United Kingdom
- Name: Enchantress
- Launched: 1825, or 1826, Bristol,
- Fate: Wrecked 16 July 1835

General characteristics
- Tons burthen: 375, or 376 (bm)

Enchantress was launched at Bristol in 1825. She was wrecked on 16 July 1835 at Tasmania.

== Career ==
Enchantress first appeared in Lloyd's Register (LR) in 1826 with Taylor, master, Drews, owners, and trade London–Rio de Janeiro.

Year	Master	Owner	Trade	Source
1827	Taylor; Roxburgh	Drews	London–Rio de Janeiro	LR
1830	Roxburg	Innes & Co.	London–Trinidad	LR

On 23 November 1832 Captain D. Roxburg sailed from England for Van Diemen's Land and New South Wales. She arrived at Hobart on 30 March 1833 and at Sydney on 24 April 1833. She brought seven assisted immigrants. One of her passengers was Isaac Friedman, the first Hungarian to settle in Australia. (Note: Friedman went on to play a leading role in the establishment of the Hobart Synagogue, the oldest synagogue in Australia.)

Enchantress, Captain Roxburgh, sailed for Mauritius on 11 July 1833. Enchantress, Captain David Roxborough, arrived in Port Jackson from Mauritius on 16 January 1834. She was transporting one military prisoner who had been convicted of mutiny at Port Louis, Mauritius.

Year	Master	Owner	Trade	Source
1835	Roxburgh	Roxburgh & Co.	London–Sydney	LR

== Fate ==
Enchantress, Roxburgh, master, was lost on 16 or 17 July 1835. She was coming from England when she hit some rocks and sank off the south-west coast of Bruny Island in the D'Entrecasteaux Channel, at the mouth of the Derwent River, Van Diemens Land.

By some accounts, all on board survived. Alternatively, estimates of the number of lives lost range between 17 and perhaps 50. Captain David Roxburgh was among the survivors.

An Australian government website reports that as Enchantress started to sink, her captain and owner David Roxburgh, all the boys, and all but one of the passengers took to the quarter boats and reached Partridge Island. The second officer, 15 crew members, and one passenger took the longboat. The longboat became tangled in the rigging, and all aboard drowned. Next day the cutter Friends took the passengers to Hobart. Captain Roxburgh and four crew members followed in a gig.

A gale on 27 February 1836, pushed wreckage from Enchantress ashore at Bruny Island. There bay-whalers recovered a few items.
