= Elizabeth (1830 ship) =

History

United Kingdom
- Name: Elizabeth
- Owner: Joseph Grose (1837-1839)
- Port of registry: 18/1837 (Sydney)
- Builder: Singapore
- Launched: 1830
- Fate: Wrecked in September 1839

General characteristics
- Type: Brig
- Tons burthen: 194, or 19443/94 (bm)
- Length: 77 ft 2 in (23.5 m)
- Beam: 20 ft 0 in (6.1 m)
- Draught: 6 ft 0 in (1.8 m)
- Propulsion: Sail

Elizabeth was a merchant ship built at Singapore, British India in 1830. She made one voyage transporting convicts from the Swan River Colony to Sydney, Australia. She wrecked in 1839.

== Career ==
Under the command of Charles Pritchard, she left Singapore on 16 July 1838, with cargo and passengers. She called in at King George's Sound, then the Swan River Colony, where she offloaded some cargo and transported three prisoners, then sailed to Port Adelaide where she offloaded her passengers, called in at Port Phillip and then arrived in Sydney on 16 December 1838, where she offloaded the three prisoners and the rest of her cargo. Elizabeth departed Port Jackson in January 1829, under the command of Roberts Garrett bound for Guam and Manila in ballast.

== Fate ==
After returning from Singapore with a cargo of goods, she was driven ashore during a gale on 21/22 September 1839, along Cottesloe Beach, Western Australia.
