= Frederick and Maria (1810 ship) =

History

United Kingdom
- Name: Harriett Shakespeare
- Owner: R. Richardson & Co. or Alexander & Co.
- Builder: John Macrae
- Launched: 10 October 1810, Chittagong
- Renamed: Frederick and Maria
- Fate: Last listed 1825

General characteristics
- Tons burthen: 360, or 37193/94 (bm)
- Length: 105 ft 6 in (32.2 m)
- Beam: 28 ft 9 in (8.8 m)
- Propulsion: Sail
- Complement: 50

Frederick and Maria was launched in 1810 at Chittagong as the country ship Harriett Shakespeare, and quickly renamed. She visited Port Jackson in 1811, and otherwise traded in the Far East. She was reported to have disappeared in a hurricane in 1817. However, the report was in error and she continued to trade with India. Her last voyage appears to have occurred in 1819, though she is listed for some years after that.

== Career ==
Frederick and Maria, Captain M'Neelance, arrived at Port Jackson on 19 June 1811 from Bengal, with merchandise. She left on 28 October. She also brought some convicts from Bengal. The merchant and agent John C. Burton reported that the property he had shipped on her was worth 81,348 rupees 15 anna 2 pice (approx. £10,170).

Captain A. Acres, master of Frederick and Maria, was one of seven captains of country ships that signed a letter to the British government urging it to do something about their detention at Chuanpee as a consequence of a dispute between the government at Canton and the British East India Company.

Lloyd's List reported that Frederick and Maria had been at about 56°S 6°E on 26 July 1816 and on her way to Madras and Bengal.

Frederick and Mariawas reported to have foundered off Mauritius in March 1817 during a hurricane, with the loss of all aboard. She was on her way from Calcutta for London. Lloyd's List reported that the ship Frederick Maria, Fish, master, and the ship Eliza, M'Lardie, master, from Calcutta and bound to Île de France with rice, "are supposed to have foundered at sea."

However, Frederick and Maria apparently was not lost, and continued to trade with India. The Register of Shipping lists her among the ships licensed to trade with India, and having sailed in 1819 for Bengal with E. Harrison, master, and Richardson, owner. She continued to be listed among the licensed ships until through 1822, but with no more recent voyage. She is last listed, with stale data, in 1825.
