= New York Packet (1823 ship) =

History

United Kingdom
- Name: New York Packet
- Builder: Bristol
- Launched: 1825
- Fate: Last listed 1852

General characteristics
- Type: Barque
- Tons burthen: 270 ton (bm)
- Propulsion: Sail

New York Packet was a 270-ton merchant ship built at Bristol, England in 1823. She made one voyage transporting convicts from Tasmania to Sydney.

== Design ==
New York Packet was built at Bristol, England. She had a new deck, a partial new top sides and other repairs in 1837, and was sheathed in yellow metal in 1841.

== Career ==
Under the command of J. Gregory, she left Hobart Town on 11 August 1835, transporting six convicts, passengers, and stores and arrived at Sydney on 19 August 1835. She departed Sydney bound for Timor in ballast.

She was last listed in 1852, after she was on a voyage from Sydney to London. She was laid up for repairs in Adelaide in June 1852.
