= Florentia (1821 ship) =

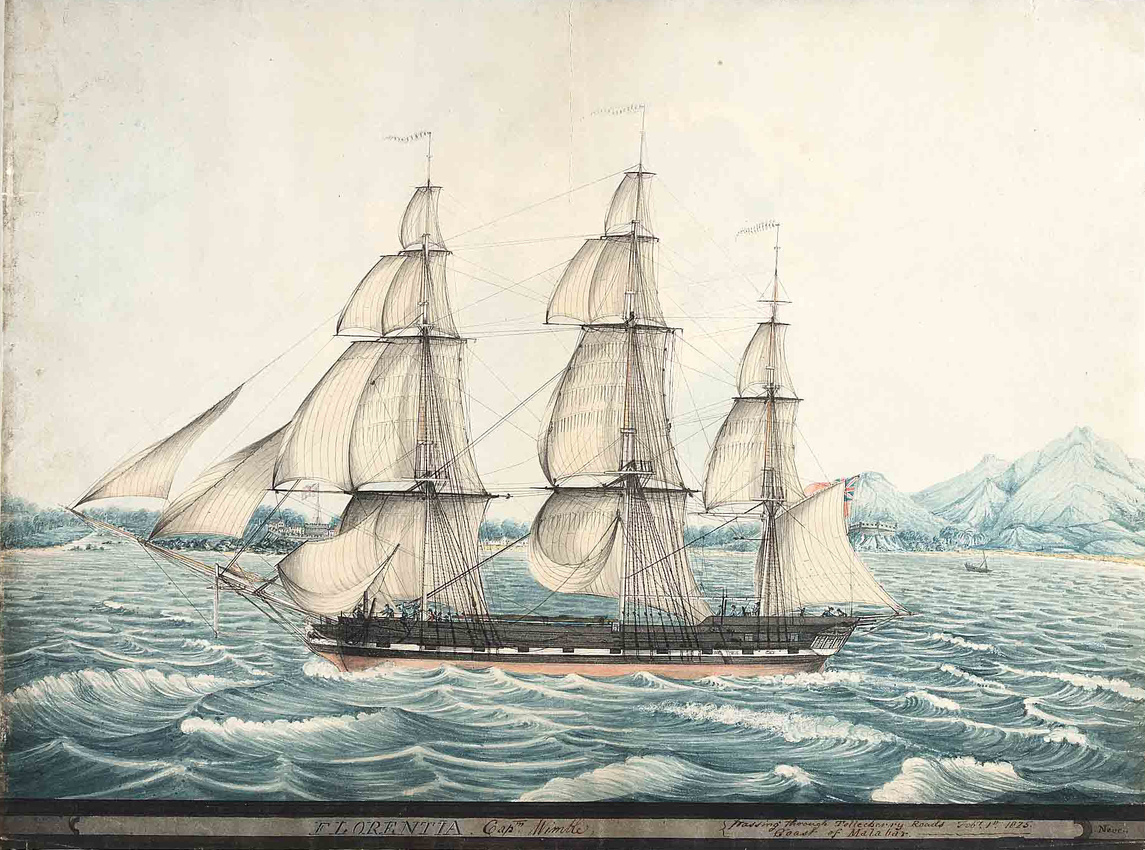
- Florentia, Captn Wimble. Passing through Telleberry Roads, off the coast of Malabar 1 February 1825

History

United Kingdom
- Name: Florentia
- Builder: Newcastle upon Tyne
- Launched: 1821

General characteristics
- Tons burthen: 453 ton (bm)
- Propulsion: Sail

Florentia was a 453-ton merchant ship built at Newcastle upon Tyne, England in 1821. She made one voyage transporting convicts from England to Australia and one voyage from Ireland to Australia. She made three voyages for the British East India Company (EIC).

== Career ==
On her first convict voyage, under the command of Horatio Billett and surgeon James Dickson, she departed England on 15 September 1827, with 165 male convicts. She arrived in Sydney on 3 January 1828. There was one convict death en route. The second convict voyage, under the command of Jeffery Drake and surgeon Andrew Henderson, she departed Ireland on 16 August 1830 with 200 male convicts. She arrived in Sydney on 15 December 1830 and had four convict deaths en route.
