= Burrell (1825 ship) =

British merchant ship

History

United Kingdom
- Name: Burrell
- Builder: Newcastle upon Tyne
- Launched: 1825

General characteristics
- Type: Barque
- Tons burthen: 402 ton (bm)
- Propulsion: Sail

The Burrell was a merchant ship built at Newcastle in 1825. She made two voyages transporting convicts from England to Australia.

== Career ==
On her first convict voyage, under the command of John Metcalf and surgeon William West, she departed Plymouth on 27 July 1830, with 192 male convicts. She arrived in Sydney on 10 December 1830. There was three convict deaths en route.

The second convict voyage, under the command of John Metcalf and surgeon George Williams, she departed Woolwich on 8 January 1832 with 101 female convicts. She arrived in Sydney on 20 May 1832 and had no deaths en route.

She plied the London/Liverpool-Quebec route and was last listed in 1854.

Peter Rowsthorn of Australia's television series Kath and Kim traced his history to the Burrel on Who Do You Think You Are? series 7.
