= Currency Lass (1826 schooner) =

History

United Kingdom
- Name: Currency Lass
- Owner: Thomas Winder
- Launched: 16 October 1826
- Fate: Sold foreign in 1839

General characteristics
- Type: Schooner
- Tons burthen: 90 ton (bm)
- Length: 58’ 8”
- Beam: 19’ 11”
- Draught: 10’ 1”
- Propulsion: Sail

Currency Lass was a 90-ton schooner, built in 1826 at Paterson Plains, New South Wales, Australia for Thomas Winder & others.

== Career ==
Built on the Paterson River at Branxton she was built by convict labour and launched in October 1826. She plied the East Australian Coast, New Zealand and Hobart Town routes with cargo and passengers.

She transported convicts from Hobart Town to Sydney in 1834 and 1835 and transported convicts in Hobart Town in 1834.

The vessel was “sold foreign” in 1839.
