= Queen Charlotte (1813 ship) =

History

United Kingdom
- Name: Queen Charlotte
- Owner: 1813:Robert Campbell and James Birnie; 1820:Robert Campbell and Emmett
- Builder: Robert Campbell, Sydney
- Launched: 1813, or 1819, or 1820
- Fate: Disappeared 1832–1833

General characteristics
- Type: Brig
- Tons burthen: 10236/94 or 121, or 136 (bm)
- Propulsion: Sail

Queen Charlotte was a merchant ship built at Sydney, New South Wales in 1813. She made two voyages transporting convicts from Bengal and Mauritius to Australia. She disappeared c.1832 while on a whaling voyage.

== Career ==
Queen Charlotte was built by Robert Campbell in Sydney, New South Wales. Captain James Birnie facilitated the completion of Queen Charlotte, which had been on the stocks. She was launched at the end of January 1813. Birnie fitted her out and she sailed for the fisheries.

Towards autumn Queen Charlotte was under the command of Captain Shelly (or Shelley), a former missionary at Tongatapu and Matavai. When she reached Eimeo he took on board several men from Raiatea and Tahiti to fish for pearls in the Paumoto Islands. Shortly after she reached the islands and started pearl fishing, the divers attacked the British crew, killing the first and second mates. At this the other crew members jumped overboard and reached shore. Two of the Tahitians onboard protected Shelley, arguing that they wished to return to Tahiti and that they would need him to navigate. When Queen Charlotte reached Tahiti the local chief restored her to Mr. Shelly, as well as most of what the Raiateans had plundered. Shelly then sailed her back to Port Jackson. Queen Charlotte returned in February 1814 with 70 tons of pearl shell.

As late as 1819 James Birnie refused to hire Queen Charlotte out to Campbell until Campbell settled his accounts. In 1820 Birnie sold Queen Charlotte to Messrs. Campbell, Jr. and Emmett.

Queen Charlotte entered Lloyd's Register (LR) in 1827 with J. Maughan, master, Campbell, owner, and trade London–New South Wales. It also gave her build year as 1819.

She transported one convict (John Jones), from Fort William, Bengal in 1829 and one convict (Robert Cunningham), from Mauritius, arriving at Sydney on 26 April 1830.

On 27 May 1831, as Queen Charlotte was arriving at Norfolk Island, her master, Captain Rennoldson accidentally set off a musket belonging to a guard escorting the prisoners she was carrying. The musket sent a ball through Rennoldson's thigh, shattering a bone. He was got on shore, but died some days later. On 17 June Queen Charlotte sailed on to New Zealand.

In late 1831 Campbell & Co. advertised Queen Charlotte for sale, apparently unsuccessfully.

== Fate ==
Queen Charlotte, of 120 tons, Turpin, master, was cleared to leave Port Jackson in mid-March 1832 to go on a whaling voyage. The last mention of a sighting of Queen Charlotte occurred on 26 April 1832 when she was reported to have been out six weeks from Sydney and to have 50 barrels of oil. The Sydney Gazette and New South Wales Advertiser reported on 7 March 1833 that the whalers Queen Charlotte and Dragon, of Port Jackson, had not been heard from for a "great length of time" and fears were entertained for their safety. Lloyd's List reported on 12 November 1833 that the whaler Queen Charlotte was believed to have been lost. Queen Charlotte was last listed in Lloyd's Register and the Register of Shipping in 1833.
