= Mary Ann (1808 Batavia ship) =

History

United Kingdom
- Name: Mary Ann
- Launched: 1808, Batavia
- Fate: Last listed in 1830

General characteristics
- Tons burthen: 474, or 479 (bm)
- Armament: 1813: 6 × 6-pounder guns; 1815: 6 × 6-pounder guns + 10 × 12-pounder carronades
- Notes: Teak-built

Mary Ann (or Mary Anne) was launched at Batavia in 1807. In 1815-1816 she transported convicts from London to Port Jackson. She then started trading with India under a licence from the British East India Company (EIC). She made a second voyage transporting convicts, carrying some to Tasmania and some on to Port Jackson. After this voyage Mary Ann returned to being an East Indiaman. She was last listed in 1830.

== Career ==
Mary Ann first appeared in Lloyd's Register (LR) in 1812.

Year	Master	Owner	Trade	Source
1812	J.Daggett; W.Curry	Newmarch	London transport	LR

In October 1812 Lloyd's List reported that Mary Ann, Curry, master, was believed to have foundered. However, on 22 October she arrived at Portsmouth from Jamaica. On 27 August a gale had caused her cargo to shift and had caused considerable damage. She had to put into Bermuda to repair. She sailed from there in the middle of September with two other vessels and under escort by HMS Ardent.

Year	Master	Owner	Trade	Source
1814	W.Curry	Newmarch	London–Grenada	LR
1815	W.Curry; Todd; C.Edwards	Newmarch	Liverpool–Pensacola	LR
Year	Master	Owner	Trade	Source
1816	C.Edwards	Parker & Co.	London−Cape of Good Hope	LR

Mary Anne, John R. Arbuthnot, master, sailed from Deal on 24 July 1815. She arrived at Port Jackson on 19 January 1816. She had embarked 103 female convicts and had suffered one convict death en route.

In 1813 the EIC had lost its monopoly on the trade between India and Britain. British ships were then free to sail to India or the Indian Ocean under a licence from the EIC.

Year	Master	Owner	Trade	Sources & notes
1818	M'Clure; Comfort; Warrington	Parker & Co.	London–Fort William, India	LR; thorough repair 1818
1819	Warrington	Parker & Co.	London–India	LR; thorough repair 1818
1821	Warrington	Parker & Co.	Cork; London–Bombay	LR; thorough repair 1818
1822	Warrington	Parker & Co.	London–Botany Bay	LR; thorough repair 1818

On 25 December 1821 Captain Henry Warrington sailed from Dartmouth. Mary Ann stopped at Rio de Janeiro 16 February 1822 before sailing on to Van Diemen's Land on the 26th. She arrived at Hobart Town on 2 May 1822. She had embarked 108 female convicts, one of whom had died on route. She landed 45 at Hobart. She then sailed on to Sydney where she landed 62.

She was at Batavia on 5 August. On her way from Sydney she spent 36 hours aground on the south-east side of "Gooning" Island in the Banda Sea. She sustained damage, including the loss of anchors and cables, and became leaky.

Year	Master	Owner	Trade	Sources & notes
1823	Warrington; Craigie	Parker & Co.	London–Botany Bay	LR; thorough repair 1818
1825	Cragie; O'Brien	Parker; Ferguson	London–Bombay	Register of Shipping (RS)
1826	O'Brien	Ferguson	London–Calcutta	RS
1830	O'Brien; Hornblow	Ferguson	London–Madras	RS

== Fate ==
Mary Ann was last listed in 1830.
