= Eleanor (1821 ship) =

History

United Kingdom
- Builder: J.Montgomery, Sulkea, Calcutta
- Launched: 4 May 1821
- Fate: Burnt 29 September 1842

General characteristics
- Tons burthen: Originally:282, or 301, or 305, or 329(bm); 1841 (post lengthening):511 (bm)

Eleanor was launched at Calcutta in 1821. She was a country ship, trading between India and South East Asia until she sailed to England in 1829. She then traded between England and India. In 1831 she transported convicts to New South Wales. A cargo fire on 29 September 1842 destroyed her.

== Career ==
Eleanor was still registered in Calcutta in 1829. Her master was C.Tabor and her managing owner was Gilmour & Co.

Eleanor first appeared in Lloyd's Register (LR) in 1829 with Edmonds, owner and master, and trade London–Bombay.

Year	Master	Owner	Trade	Source & notes
1831	Edmonds; Cock	Edmonds & Co.	London–Bengal; London–Bombay; London–New South Wales	Register of Shipping

Captain Robert Cock sailed from Portsmouth on 19 February 1831, bound to New South Wales with convicts. Eleanor arrived at Sydney on 25 June. She had embarked 193 male convicts, none of whom died on the voyage.

Year	Master	Owner	Trade	Source & notes
1834	Hyen	Edmonds & Co.	London	LR
1835	Havelock	Edmonds; Godwin & Co.	London	LR
1840	Holderness	Godwin & Co.	London–Sydney	LR; damages repaired 1838 & thorough repair and lengthening 1841

== Fate ==
A fire in her cargo of cotton on 29 September 1842 destroyed Eleanor off Aleppee.

The loss gave rise to a suit, "Jussuff Balladina vs Holderness", decided at Bombay on 20 June 1843. Mr. Balladina chartered Eleanor, Holdernesss, master, to carry a cargo of cotton from Bombay to Calcutta, and then to return to Bombay. He gave Captain Holderness a sum of Ruppees 3900 before the voyage. The issue was whether this was a payment of freight in advance, or a loan at no interest for costs attendant on preparing the vessel for the voyage, to be repaid after the vessel's return. The court declared the amount a loan, not freight in advance, and ordered Holderness to reimburse Balladina.
