= Integrity (1824 ship) =

History

United Kingdom
- Name: Integrity
- Builder: Redbridge, Southampton
- Launched: 1824
- Fate: Wrecked in August 1841

General characteristics
- Type: Brig
- Tons burthen: 220 ton (bm)
- Propulsion: Sail

Integrity was a 220-ton merchant ship built at Redbridge, Southampton, England in 1824. She made two voyages transporting convicts from Mauritius to Australia. She was wrecked in the Torres Strait in August 1841.

== Career ==
Under the command of John Pearson, she left Mauritius on 4 June 1837 with five military convicts, passengers and cargo. She sailed via Hobart Town on 9 August and arrived at Sydney on 17 August. One convict died on the voyage. Integrity sailed from Port Jackson, after refitting, on 12 January 1838, bound for Calcutta in ballast.

On her second convict voyage under the command of John Pearson, she left Mauritius on 18 April 1838 with three male convicts, passengers and cargo. She sailed via Hobart Town on 20 June arrived at Sydney on 5 July. No convicts died on the voyage. Integrity left Port Jackson on 20 November for New Zealand.

== Fate ==
Integrity was lost in the Torres Strait on 22 August 1841 while on a voyage from Sydney to Singapore, under the command of John Pearson. The crew left in her long boat and were picked up by the ships John Knox and Thomas Crisp.
