= Eliza (1815 ship) =

History

United Kingdom
- Name: Eliza
- Owner: 1817:Kyd & Co.; 1829:J. Ward
- Builder: Java
- Launched: 1815
- Fate: Last listed in 1846

General characteristics
- Tons burthen: 373, or 391, or 392 (bm)
- Propulsion: Sail

Eliza was a merchant ship built in Java, Netherlands East Indies, in 1815. She was registered at Calcutta in 1818. She made two voyages transporting convicts from England to Australia. She was last listed in Lloyd's Register in 1848.

== Career ==
Under the command of William Doutty and surgeon J. Patterson, she left London, England, on 29 June 1828, and arrived in Sydney on 18 November. She had embarked 158 male convicts and had eight deaths en route. Seven of the eight deaths were due to dysentery. It appeared while Eliza was becalmed for a while in the Doldrums, and disappeared after she left the tropics (Note: Bateson reports the death rate as one per every 18.7 convicts embarked; actually, the rate was one per 19.75, or 5 percent.) Eliza departed Port Jackson on 19 March 1829 bound for London with produce.

On her second convict voyage Eliza was under the command of William Doutty and surgeon David Thompson. She left London on 7 November 1829, arrived in Hobart Town on 24 February 1830. She had embarked 117 female convicts and had two deaths en route. Eliza departed Hobart Town in June 1830, bound for Singapore.

== Notes, citation, and references ==
Notes

Citations

References

- Bateson, Charles (1959). The Convict Ships. Brown, Son & Ferguson. OCLC 3778075.
- Phipps, John (1840). A Collection of Papers Relative to Ship Building in India ...: Also a Register Comprehending All the Ships ... Built in India to the Present Time ... Scott.
