= Lord Wellington (1810 ship) =

1810-1822 British ship

History

United Kingdom
- Name: Lord Wellington
- Namesake: Arthur Wellesley, 1st Duke of Wellington
- Owner: 1810:F.(or P.) &G. Clay.
- Builder: John King, Frindsbury, Rochester, Kent
- Launched: 24 November 1810
- Fate: Wrecked 17 December 1822

General characteristics
- Tons burthen: 399, or 39922/94 (bm)
- Length: 111 ft 8 in (34.0 m)
- Beam: 28 ft 3 in (8.6 m)
- Propulsion: Sail
- Armament: 14 × 12-pounder carronades

Lord Wellington was launched in 1810 at Rochester, or equally, Chatham, as a West Indiaman. She made at least one voyage to India under a license from the British East India Company (EIC). She then made a voyage to New South Wales transporting female convicts from England and Ireland. She was lost in December 1822 off Denmark while sailing from Saint Petersburg to London.

== Career ==
Lord Wellington first appeared in Lloyd's Register (LR) in 1811 with R.(or B.) Byron, master, P&G Clay, owners, and trade London–Jamaica.

In late 1815 Captain Ramsay replaced Byron as captain of Lord Wellington. On 8 February 1816 Lord Wellington ran on shore between Deal and Sandwich during a snow squall. She had been sailing from London to Jamaica. She was got off after much of her cargo had been discharged and taken to Ramsgate. She herself was expected to return to the Thames to undergo repairs. She was refloated on the 11th and arrived back at Gravesend on the 16th. She sailed for Jamaica again on 27 March. She arrived in Jamaica on 10 May.

In 1813 the EIC had lost its monopoly on the trade between India and Britain. British ships were then free to sail to India or the Indian Ocean under a license from the EIC.

Captain Hill sailed Lord Wellington to Bombay in August 1816.

LR for 1818 showed Lord Wellington with L[ew] (or L[aurence]) Hill, master, F&G Clay, owners, and trade London–India.

On 28 May 1819 Captain Lew Hill sailed from Deptford with female convicts for New South Wales. Lord Wellington gathered more female convicts at Cork, and sailed from there on 6 July. She sailed via Rio de Janeiro and arrived at Port Jackson on 20 January 1820. She landed 121 female convicts with 35 children, and 10 free women with 10 children. There were no convict deaths on the voyage. (Note: Lloyd's Register for 1820 also showed Lord Wellington sailing (or intending to sail) for Bombay on 4 April 1819.)

Year	Master	Owner	Trade	Source & notes
1820	L. Hill	Blakely	Cork–London	LR; damages repaired 1816
1823	J.Everitt	Blakely	Liverpool–Elsinor	Register of Shipping
1825	T.Edwards	Blakely	Liverpool–"Hlsnfd"	LR; damages repaired 1816

== Fate ==
A letter dated Elsinor 23 December 1822 reported that Lord Wellington, Everard, master, of and for London, had wrecked on 17 December on Anholt Reef in the Kattegat as she was sailing from Saint Petersburg. Her crew and her stores had been saved and it was expected that her cargo would be saved too. A letter from Elsinor dated 4 March 1823 reported that the wreck of Lord Wellington had been thrown on to the shore of Sweden. Captain Everard had therefore come to Elsinor from Anhold.

Lord Wellington was last listed in the Register of Shipping in 1823 and in LR in 1825.
