= Agamemnon (1811 ship) =

History

United Kingdom
- Name: Agamemnon
- Namesake: Agamemnon
- Builder: Sunderland
- Launched: 1811
- Fate: Wrecked 2 June 1826

General characteristics
- Tons burthen: 540, or 542, or 543 (bm)
- Propulsion: Sail

Agamemnon was launched at Sunderland in 1811. She traded with India and made one voyage in 1820 transporting convicts to New South Wales. She was wrecked in 1826.

== Career ==
Agamemnon appeared in Lloyd's Register (LR) in the supplemental pages to the 1811 volume with owner Nicholson.

In 1813, the EIC had lost its monopoly on the trade between India and Britain. British ships were then free to sail to India or the Indian Ocean under a license from the EIC. Agamemnon's owners applied for a licence on 6 October 1814, and received the licence on 8 October.

Lloyd's Register (1816), listed Agamemnon, with J. Jackson, master, and Nicholson, owner, as traveling between London and Bombay. Lloyd's List reported on 25 March 1817, that Agamemnon, while sailing from Bengal to London, had been required to put into Isle of France for repairs to damage that she had sustained.

Agamemnon, Robert Surtees, master, left Portsmouth on 3 May 1820. She sailed via Rio de Janeiro and arrived at Port Jackson on 22 September. She had embarked 179 male convicts, one of whom died on the voyage. The 47th Regiment of Foot provided a guard detachment of 31 men, which were under the command of Lieutenant Keays of the 48th Regiment.

Agamemnon returned to England via Madras and Bombay. On 21 November 1820, she left for Madras carrying the various detachments of troops that had come out as guards on convict transports. The troops were to rejoin their regiments. She was reported to have been at 30°20′N 32°45′E on 4 September 1821, and short of provisions, having been out five months. On 28 September, Agamemnon, Surees, master, arrived at Dover, despite having been reported to have been condemned at the Cape of Good Hope.

On 17 March 1825, Agamemnon, Walker, master, put back into Greenock after having run aground on Tuskar Rock, Ireland. She had been on a voyage to St John, New Brunswick.

== Fate ==
Lloyd's Register (1826), listed Agamemnon with J. Jackson, master, changing to J. Crole, Pollock & Co., owner, and trade Greenock — "Mrmc". Lloyd's List reported that Agamemnon, of Port Glasgow, Crowell, master, had wrecked on Cape Sable Island, Nova Scotia, on 2 June 1826, while sailing from St John, New Brunswick. The crew were taken to Halifax.
