= Neptune (1836 ship) =

History

United Kingdom
- Name: Neptune
- Builder: Chepstow
- Launched: 1836
- Fate: Last listed 1845

General characteristics
- Tons burthen: Old Act: 368 (bm); New Act (post 1836): 499 (bm)
- Length: 104 ft (32 m)
- Beam: 24 ft 6 in (7.5 m)
- Depth: 20 ft (6 m)
- Propulsion: Sail
- Notes: One main deck and a poop deck, 3 masts, ship rig, square stern, quarter galleries, and a male bust head.

Neptune was a merchant ship built at Chepstow, Wales in 1836. She made one voyage transporting convicts from Ireland to Australia.

== Career ==
Neptune first appeared in Lloyd's Register (LR) in 1836.

Year	Master	Owner	Trade	Homeport	Source & notes
1836		J[ohn] Irving	Liverpool	Bristol	LR

Her first voyage, in early 1837, was to Barbados. She was under the command of J. Nagle, and she arrived back in May.

On her only convict voyage, under the command of Joseph (or Jeremiah) Nagle and surgeon Patrick Martyn, she departed Dublin, Ireland on 27 August 1837, and arrived in Sydney on 2 January 1838. She had embarked 200 male convicts; there were three convict deaths en route. From Sydney she sailed to New Zealand, and then to Callao and Valparaiso. She arrived back at Liverpool on 21 May 1839. Her cargo consisted of 47 tons of copper ore, 725 bales of cotton, 79 tons of Nicaragua wood, 19 bales of wool, 132 pieces of copper, and eight seal skins.

Year	Master	Owner	Trade	Hoomeport	Source
1839	J.Nagle	Lockett	Liverpool–Valparaiso	Liverpool	LR; large repair 1839
1840	Nagle; McDonald	Lockett	Liverpool–Valparaiso	Liverpool	LR; large repair 1839
1845		Lockett	Liverpool–Bombay	Liverpool	LR; large repair 1839

She is last listed in 1845.
