= Jolly Rambler (1813 sloop) =

History

United Kingdom
- Name: Jolly Rambler
- Owner: 1833 - Harris & Co.
- Port of registry: Sydney, 16/1835; Sydney, 29/1836
- Builder: Broadstairs
- Launched: 1813
- Fate: Wrecked in 1836

General characteristics
- Tons burthen: 58 (bm)
- Length: 46.7 feet (14.2 m)
- Beam: 15.4 feet (4.7 m)
- Draught: 8.6 feet (2.6 m)
- Propulsion: Sail

Jolly Rambler was a merchant sloop built at Broadstairs, England in 1813. She made a number of voyages between Swan River, Launceston, Port Jackson, Java and New Zealand with cargo and undertook one voyage transporting one convict to New South Wales.

== Career ==
Under the command of Joseph Brignall, she sailed via Cape of Good Hope and arrived at the Swan River Colony on 21 December 1832. She arrived at Sydney on 19 May 1833, from Swan Bay with passengers and the convict Benjamin Hinks.

Jolly Rambler plied the Launceston to Sydney route before sailing to Java and returning with goods to Swan Bay on 25 January 1835. Under the command of George Griffin, she ran ashore at Poverty Bay, New Zealand during a gale. She was refloated, repaired and returned to Sydney on 5 April 1836.

== Fate ==
She struck the Macleay River bar on 11 December 1836 and was a total loss. There were no deaths.
