= Hindostan (1819 ship) =

History

United Kingdom
- Name: Hindostan
- Namesake: Hindustan
- Owner: Christian Richardson and Co.
- Builder: Holt and Richardson, Whitby
- Launched: 1819
- Fate: Foundered in 1851

General characteristics
- Tons burthen: 1819:424, or 425, (bm); 1836: 544 (bm)
- Length: 109 ft 10 in (33.5 m)
- Beam: 29 ft 10 in (9.1 m)
- Propulsion: Sail

Hindostan was launched at Whitby in 1819. She made one voyage, in 1821, transporting convicts to New South Wales. Later, she made two voyages transporting convicts to Van Diemen's Land, one with female convicts (1839), and one with male convicts (1840–1841). When not transporting convicts Hindostan was a general trader, sailing across the Atlantic, to India, and perhaps elsewhere as well. She was lost in 1841.

== Career ==
Hindostan appeared in Lloyd's Register (LR) in 1820 with Williamson, master, Herring, owner, and trade London–Calcutta. She sailed to Calcutta on 25 January 1820 under a license from the British East India Company (EIC).

Next, the British government chartered Hindostan to carry convicts to New South Wales. Captain William Williamson sailed from Portsmouth on 29 July 1821 and arrived at Port Jackson on 24 November. She had embarked 152 male convicts, none of whom died during the voyage. She left for Madras in December.

In 1839 Hindostan carried convicts to Van Diemen's Land. Captain George Lamb sailed from London on 9 May 1839 and arrived at Hobart Town on 7 December. Hindostan had embarked 179 female convicts and she landed 178, having suffered one convict death en route.

In 1840–1841 Hindostan again carried convicts to Hobart Town. Captain Lamb sailed from London on 7 October 1840 and arrived at Port Jackson on 19 January 1841. Hindostan had embarked 209 male convicts, all of whom survived the voyage.

Year	Master	Owner	Trade	Source & notes
1825	Lamb	Herring	London–Quebec	LR
1830	G. Lamb	Richardson	London–Quebec	LR
1835	G. Lamb			LR
1840	G. Lamb	Richardson	London–Hobart Town	LR: thorough repair 1836
1845	G. Lamb	Richardson	London–Bombay	LR: thorough repair 1836 & small repairs 1844
1850	G. Lamb	Richardson	Bristol–New York	LR; small repairs 1848

== Fate ==
Hindostan foundered in the Atlantic Ocean on 27 August 1851. Nine of her sixteen crew went down with the ship. Survivors took to a boat and were rescued on 27 September by the schooner Martha Greenow. Hindostan was on a voyage from Whitby to Quebec City, Province of Canada, British North America.
