= Numa (1811 ship) =

History

United Kingdom
- Name: Numa
- Owner: 1812:Goodson; 1834:Somes & Co.
- Builder: John White, Thomas Young, & Edward Potts, Sunderland
- Launched: 1 January 1811
- Fate: Last listed 1854

General characteristics
- Tons burthen: 326, or 32611/94 (bm)
- Propulsion: Sail
- Armament: 2 × 6-pounder guns + 12 × 9-pounder carronades

Numa was launched at Sunderland in 1811. She made one voyage as a whaler and one voyage transporting convicts to New South Wales. She spent the last part of her career trading between Sunderland and Quebec, and was last listed in 1854.

== Career ==
Numa first appears (somewhat illegibly) in Lloyd's Register in 1811. She first appears in the Register of Shipping in 1812 with Hawkins, master, Goodson, owner, and trade London—Greenland. The London—Greenland trade suggests that she was a whaler.

In 1919, under the command of Captain House, Numa sailed on 22 October for the South Seas Fishery. She returned on 11 May 1821 with 600 casks of whale oil, and fins (baleen).

Numa, Captain Wade, arrived at Sydney on 5 July 1828. She had sailed from London on 8 January and the Cape of Good Hope on 11 May. She brought general merchandise and passengers. She also brought 18 sheep and two blood horses.

In 1829 Numa was still under Captain James Wade's command. She was on her way from Java to England when in October she stopped at Simon's Town. There customs officers seized her "on the plea of having five slaves on board".

On 29 January 1834, Captain John Barker sailed from Portsmouth for Sydney. Numa arrived on 13 June, having sailed via Saint Helena and the Cape of Good Hope. She had embarked 140 female convicts, two of whom died en route.
