= Vittoria (1813 Gainsborough ship) =

History

United Kingdom
- Name: Vittoria
- Launched: 1813, Gainsborough
- Fate: Last listed 1854

General characteristics
- Tons burthen: 395, or 400 (bm)
- Propulsion: Sail

Vittoria was a sailing ship built in 1813 at Gainsborough. She made one voyage transporting convicts to Australia. She was last listed in 1854.

== Career ==
Lloyd's Register for 1813 shows Vittoria, of Hull, with Woodhouse, master, Smith, owner, and trade Hull—London. (At the time, Gainsborough was an important port with trade downstream to Hull, and was the most inland port in England, located more than 55 miles (90 km) from the North Sea.)

Year	Master	Owner	Trade	Source
1815	C.Brady; Gilchrist; H.Watson	Todd & Co.	London-Petersburg; London–Antigua	LR
1818	P.Carlisle	Mitchell	London–Havana	LR
1819	Carlisle; Tate; Bennington	Mitchell	London–Havana	LR
1821	Bennington; Lacey; Elliot	Mitchell	London–Petersburg; London–Jamaica	LR
1822	Elliot; Tate	Mitchell	London–Jamaica; London–Trinidad	LR
1823	Tate; Birmington	Mitchell	London–Trinidad	LR; small repairs 1821
1824	Birmington; Tate	Mitchell	London–Elsinor; London–Trinidad	LR; small repairs 1821 & 1824
1826	Sisk	Hill & Co.	London–Jamaica	LR; small repairs 1821 & 1824
1827	Sisk; J.Ranking	Hill & Co.	London–Jamaica	LR; small repairs 1821 & 1824
1828	J.Ranking; J.Smith	Hill & Co.	London transport	LR; small repairs 1821 & 1824

Under the command of John Smith, with the surgeon James Dickson, Vittoria sailed from Devonport, England on 1 September 1828, and arrived at Port Jackson on 17 January 1829 Vittoria embarked 160 male convicts and had nine deaths en route. Lieutenant Aubyn and 30 men of the 63rd Regiment of Foot provided the guard.

Vittoria left Port Jackson on 24 February 1829 bound for Batavia.

Vittoria, late Smith, master, put into Mauritius on 25 November 1829. On her way from Manila to London she had an encounter in which Malays had killed her master, second mate, boatswain, carpenter, and part of the crew. She was in want of a foremast and extensive repairs. A letter from Mauritius dated 28 November 1829 reported that the killers were four Manila men, taken on there. After they had killed the captain, second mate, boatswain, and a woman, and wounded several crew members, they took command of the vessel. They were able to maintain control for a week before the Chief Mate, whom they had spared to navigate Vittoria to California, was able to regain control of her, after having killed two of the four Manila men. The remaining two were secured and turned over to the authorities when Vittoria reached Mauritius. Vittoria, Andrews, master, arrived at Cowes on 21 May 1830 from Manila.

Further details emerged when she reached Cowes. The murders had taken place on 7 September 1829 at 9°17′N 127°00′E. The mutineers had killed the master, second mate, boatswain, carpenter, and a crew man. Vittoria was heavily laden and to lighten her the mutineers had jettisoned part of the cargo and the deckraft. Mr. Andrews, the Chief Mate, had started to plan the vessel's recapture on 9 September, together with the rest of the surviving crew, and succeeded in his plans on 12 September. The two surviving mutineers were tried at Mauritius and one was hanged on Vittoria. The other was reprieved on the scaffold and shipped back to Manila. Vittoria left Mauritius on 2 January 1830 and Saint Helena on 20 March.

Year	Master	Owner	Trade	Source
1830	J.Smith; H.Andrews	Hill & Co.	London–New South Wales	LR
1831	H.Andrews; Foster	Bolcott & Co.	Cowes	LR; small repairs 1821 & 1824

In December 1831 it was reported that Vittoria, Foster, master, was dismasted on her way back from Miramichi to Cowes and that 10 crew members had bees swept overboard. She was in Bantry Bay and was expected to put into Beerhaven. When she got to Bearhaven, the gales prevented her from getting into harbour. Foster, the mate, and six crew were taken out, but two men were left behind. Nine men had been killed by falling masts or being swept overboard. When she was finally brought into harbour only the master, mate, and seven seamen had survived. The steamer Superb towed Vittoria from Bearhaven to Cork.

Year	Master	Owner	Trade	Source & notes
1832	Foster; Mitchell	Rogers & Co.	London–Miramichi	LR; small repairs 1821 & 1824, & thorough repair 1832
1835	J.Napier; N.Mitchell	Mitchell & Co.	London–Quebec	LR; large repair 1832

Year	Master	Owner	Trade	Source & notes
1854	G.Dunning	Rogers & Co.	Plymouth–Sierra Leone	LR; small repairs 1849 & 1853

== Fate ==
Vittoria was last listed in Lloyd's Register in 1854.

== Sources ==
- Bateson, Charles (1959). The Convict Ships, 1787-1868. Brown, Son & Ferguson. OCLC 3778075.
