= Mangalore (1811 ship) =

Country ship, probably launched in 1811 in India

History

United Kingdom
- Name: Mangalore
- Namesake: Mangalore
- Launched: c.1811
- Fate: Wrecked 1812

General characteristics
- Tons burthen: 300 (bm)

Mangalore was a country ship, probably launched in 1811 in India. She made one voyage from Calcutta to Port Jackson and was lost in 1812 off Sumatra while on a second voyage from Calcutta to Port Jackson.

== Origins ==
Mangalore's origins are currently obscure. She does not appear in an 1809 list of vessels belonging to Bombay or Calcutta. She does not appear in Bulley's (2000) book of the Bombay country ships. Nor does her year or place of launch appear in Phipp's (1840) book, which has the most complete list of vessels launched at the various ship-building sites in the Bay of Bengal. Currently the best estimate is that she was built circa 1811 on the west coast of India, possibly at Mangalore.

== Voyage to Port Jackson ==
Mangalore, Patrick, master, first appears in online resources with her arrival at Port Jackson on 1 November 1811 from Bengal. She left Port Jackson on 28 November with destination Bengal. She brought "Bengal sugar, fine Hyion tea, calicoes, blue bastas, wax and tallow candles, canvas sacks, shirts and trowsers of a superior quality, indigo; bandanna handkerchiefs, taffities of various colours, long cloth and punjum, salt-petre, pepper, spice, mirzapore and patna chintz, a small quantity of striped, and checked dureas, sugar candy, rice, table cloths and towels, fine chinlz Europe patterns. Madeira wine, window glass, which will be sold by the bag, chest, bale, or package". She sailed for Bengal on 12 December. She arrived at Calcutta on 15 March after a tedious voyage. She had called at Bencoolen, where she taken on board troops for Bengal.

== Loss ==
Mangalore, John Earl, master, sailed from Saugor on 10 September 1812, bound for Port Jackson. She wrecked, circa 10 October, off Manna. (Note: Manna Point or Town, southeast of Fort Marlborough, on the west coast of Sumatra; now Mana (4.484947°S 102.899207°E). Phipps mistakenly locates the wreck off the Malabar coast.) The sole survivor, a lascar, estimated that there had been 110 persons aboard, including passengers and a havildar and 12 sepoys. The value of her cargo was 1,70,000 rupees.

According to the sole survivor, a tremendous water spout hit Mangalore, dismasting her, the falling masts killing the captain and both mates and destroying her boats. She then started to sink. The survivor clung to wreckage until he drifted ashore.

The news reached Calcutta around 24 January 1813. Lloyd's List reported the fact of the loss on 18 June 1813.
