= Isabella (1823 ship) =

History

United Kingdom
- Name: Isabella
- Owner: Maughan (1823)
- Launched: 1823, Redbridge
- Fate: Last listed in 1856

General characteristics
- Type: Brig
- Tons burthen: 178, or 179 (bm)
- Propulsion: Sail

Isabella was a 179-ton merchant ship built in Redbridge, England, in 1823. She made one voyage transporting convicts from Mauritius to Australia.

== Career ==
Isabella appears in the Register of Shipping with Maughan as master and owner, and with trade London to Hamburg.

Year	Master	Owner	Trade	Source & notes
1825	Maughan	Maughan	London–Vigo	Lloyd's Register (LR)
1830	Maughan	Maughan	London–Hamburg	LR; small repairs 1829

Isabella, under the command of George Maughan left Cowes, Isle of Wight on 21 February 1833 with a general cargo and arrived at Cockburn Sound, Western Australia, on 24 July 1833.

Year	Master	Owner	Trade	Source & notes
1835	Maughan			LR

She left Mauritius on 25 February 1837 with two military convicts and cargo. She sailed via Hobart Town on 22 April arriving at Sydney on 6 May. No convicts died on the voyage.

Isabella sailed from Sydney for London, under the command of Captain Ryan, on 6 March 1838, with passengers and cargo. A "piratical brig" under a Spanish flag boarded her on 4 July and took a new main-top-sail, a cask of beef, and various other articles. Isabella then arrived safely at Torbay.

Year	Master	Owner	Trade	Source & notes
1840	Maughan; L.Neve	Taylor & Co.	London–Hamburg	LR; damages repaired 1838
1845	Le Neve	Taylor & Co.	London–Hamburg	LR; thorough repair 1841 and damages repaired 1845
1850	Le Neve	Taylor & Co.		LR
1855	E.Lyle	T.S.Atkins		LR

She is last listed in Lloyds Register in 1856 with E.S. Lyle, master, and T.S.Atkins, owner, and no trade.
