= Diamond (1835 ship) =

History

United Kingdom
- Name: Diamond
- Owner: 1838: Elder & Co.
- Builder: Isle of Man
- Launched: 1835
- Fate: Last listed 1853

General characteristics
- Tons burthen: 573 (bm)
- Propulsion: Sail

Diamond was a merchant ship built on Isle of Man in 1835. She made a number of voyages between England and India with cargo and undertook one voyage transporting convicts to New South Wales.

== Career ==
Under the command of James Bissett and surgeon William McDowell, she sailed from Cork, Ireland on 29 November 1837 and arrived at Sydney on 28 March 1838. She embarked 161 female convicts and had one death en route. A number of women, children and one male passenger accompanied the voyage.

Diamond departed Port Jackson on 16 May 1838, bound for Java.

She is last listed in Lloyd's Register of Shipping in 1853.
