= Recovery (1811 ship) =

UK merchant ship and convict transport 1811–1847

History

1799: Batavian Republic; 1806: Kingdom of Holland; 1811: France
- Launched: 1799, Batavia
- Captured: c.1811

United Kingdom
- Name: Recovery
- Owner: John Chapman & Co.
- Acquired: 1811 by purchase of a prize
- Fate: Removed from Lloyd's Register in 1848

General characteristics
- Tons burthen: At capture:470, Post 1817:493, or 494, or 499 (bm)
- Propulsion: Sail
- Armament: 8 × 18-pounder guns "of the New Construction"
- Notes: Teak built

Recovery was a merchant ship built at Batavia in 1799 and taken in prize circa 1811. She made two voyages transporting convicts from England to Australia and one from Ireland to Australia. She also made two voyages for the British East India Company (EIC). She was last listed in 1847.

== Career ==
Recovery was built at Batavia in 1799. She was taken in prize and sold to John Chapman, who renamed her. She entered Lloyd's Register in 1811 with Hindmarsh, master, Chapman, owner, and trade London transport. She underwent rebuilding in 1811, but it is not clear whether before or after her capture.

Recovery underwent lengthening in 1817.

On her first convict voyage, under the command of William Fotherly and surgeon Peter Cunningham, she departed Woolwich on 31 July 1819, and arrived in Sydney on 18 December 1819. She embarked 188 male convicts and there were no convict deaths en route.

On her second convict voyage, under the command of William Fotherly and surgeon Peter Cunningham, she departed Cork, Ireland on 5 April 1823 and arrived in Sydney on 30 July 1823. She embarked 131 male convicts and had one convict death en route.

On Recovery's first voyage for the EIC, Captain Henry Cleaver Chapman sailed from The Downs on 7 June 1830, bound for Madras and Bengal. She reached Madras on 17 September, and arrived at Calcutta on 12 October. Homeward bound, she was at Kedgeree on 4 January 1831, reached St Helena on 8 March, and arrived at The Downs on 12 May.

Captain Thomas Wellbank sailed Recovery from Falmouth on 9 July 1832, bound for Bengal, again for the EIC. She reached Calcutta on 3 December. Homeward bound, she was at Saugor on 24 January 1833 and the Cape of Good Hope on 27 March. She reached St Helena on 9 April and arrived at The Downs on 30 May.

On her third convict voyage, under the command of Thomas Johnson and surgeon Alexander Neill, Recovery departed London on 30 October 1835 and arrived in Sydney on 25 February 1836. She embarked 280 male convicts and there were five convict deaths en route.

Recovery underwent large repairs in 1837 and 1842.

Year	Master	Owner	Trade	Source
1839	Johnson	Chapman	London	LR; lengthened 1817, & large repairs 1837
1845	Johnson	Chapman	London	LR; lengthened 1817, & damages repaired 1837, & large repair 1842

== Fate ==
Recovery was last listed in Lloyd's Register in 1847 with Johnson, master, Chapman, owner, homeport London, and trade London.
