= Georgiana (1826 ship) =

History

United Kingdom
- Name: Georgiana
- Builder: William Newton, Quebec
- Launched: 1826
- Fate: Last listed in 1841

General characteristics
- Type: Barque
- Tons burthen: 404, or 483 (bm)
- Length: 109 ft (33 m)
- Beam: 29 ft (8.8 m)
- Propulsion: Sail

Georgiana was a merchant ship built in Quebec, Canada in 1826. She made three voyages transporting convicts from England to Australia. Georgiana was last listed in 1841.

== Career ==
Georgiana first appeared in Lloyd's Register (LR) in 1828. Her master was J.Barley, changing to J. Thompson, her owner was Thompson, and her trade was London—Quebec.

Under the command of John Thompson and surgeon Coleman, who was replaced by David Conway, she left Plymouth, England on 15 December 1828 with convicts, passengers, and cargo. She sailed via Cape of Good Hope, where she stayed between 27 February 1829 and 3 March, and arrived at Hobart Town on 20 April. She had embarked 170 male convicts, three of whom died on the voyage. The guard consisted of a lieutenant and 29 men from the 40th Regiment of Foot. Georgiana sailed from Hobart with passengers, cargo and two convicts and arrived at Sydney on 12 June 1829. She left Port Jackson on 12 July bound for Bombay via Hobart Town.

On her second convict voyage under the command of John Thompson, and surgeon John Tarn, she left London, England, on 1 April 1831 with convicts, passengers, and cargo, and arrived at Sydney on 27 July 1831. She embarked 182 male convicts; two convicts died on the voyage. Georgiana left Port Jackson on 4 October, bound for Mauritius.

For her third convict voyage Georgiana was again under the command of John Thompson and surgeon James Hall. She left Portsmouth, England on 16 October 1832 and arrived at Hobart Town on 1 February 1833. (Note: Bateson mis-attributes this voyage to Georgiana. That Georgiana, however, was engaged in a voyage from England to Bengal and back for the British East India Company.) She embarked with 184 male convicts, and also carried passengers and cargo; no convicts died on the voyage. Georgiana left Hobart Town on 5 March, bound for Batavia.

Year	Master	Owner	Trade	Source
1835	Thompson	Thompson	Liverpool–Charleston	LR
1840	Stable	NA	London–Sierra Leone	LR

== Fate ==
Gerogiana was last listed in Lloyd's Register in 1841.
