= Fame (1812 ship) =

UK merchant ship and convict transport 1812–1817

History

United Kingdom
- Name: Fame
- Owner: 1812:Linthorne; 1813:J. R. Bell & Co.
- Builder: Quebec
- Fate: Wrecked 1817

General characteristics
- Tons burthen: 464, or 475, or 480, or 489 (bm)
- Propulsion: Sail
- Armament: 2 × 6-pounder guns + 10 × 18-pounder carronades

Fame was built at Quebec in 1812 and was lost in 1817 after transporting convicts to New South Wales.

== Career ==
Fame entered the Register of Shipping in 1813 with Shivewright, master, changing to Gardner, Linthorn, owner, changing to Bell & Co., burthen 475 tons, changing to 489 tons, and trade "London", changing to "London transport". Lloyd's Register had Gardner, master, Linthorne, owner, burthen 489 tons, and trade London.

The Register of Shipping for 1816 had Gardner, master, changing to Dale, and trade "London transport" changing to London—Botany Bay.

Fame, under the command of Captain Henry Dale, and with John Mortimer as surgeon, left Spithead 9 October 1816. She arrived at Port Jackson on 8 March 1817. She embarked with 200 male convicts, two of whom died on the way. Lieutenant Orange commanded 30 other ranks from the 48th Regiment of Foot, who provided the guard.

== Fate ==
There is some ambiguity about Fame's fate. Fame left Sydney on 1 May, bound for Batavia and Calcutta. One highly credible source reports that Fame was wrecked in the Torres Strait about the middle of 1817, probably in May.

However, Lloyd's Register and the Register of Shipping continued to carry Fame well into the 1820s with information that was contradictory and stale. Both registers were only as accurate as owners of vessels chose to keep them.

Year	Master	Owner	Trade	Notes	Source
1818	Dale	Bell	London—Botany Bay		Register of Shipping
1818	Dale	Wilkinson	London—Botany Bay	Licensed ships	Register of Shipping
1818	Dale	Wilkinson	London—Botany Bay		Lloyd's Register
1818	H. Dale	J.R. Bell	London—Fort William	Licensed ships (sailed 3 March 1817)	Lloyd's Register
1819	Dale	Wilkinson	London—Petersburg		Register of Shipping
1819	Dale	Wilkinson	London—Botany Bay		Lloyd's Register
1820	Dale	Wilkinson	London—Petersburg		Register of Shipping
1820	Dale	Wilkinson	London—Botany Bay		Lloyd's Register
1821	Dale	Bell & Co.	London—Petersburg		Register of Shipping
1821	Dale	Wilkinson	London—Botany Bay		Lloyd's Register
1822	Dale	Bell & Co.	London—Petersburg		Register of Shipping
1822	Dale	Wilkinson	London—Botany Bay		Lloyd's Register
1823	Dale	Bell & Co.	London—Petersburg		Register of Shipping
1823	Dale	Wilkinson	London—Botany Bay		Lloyd's Register
1824	Dale	Bell & Co.	London—Petersburg		Register of Shipping
1824				No longer listed	Lloyd's Register
1825	Dale	Bell & Co.	London—Petersburg	Last surveyed 1818	Register of Shipping
1826				No longer listed	Register of Shipping
