= Drummore (1830 ship) =

History

United Kingdom
- Name: Drummore
- Owner: 1839: Aitchison
- Builder: Leith
- Launched: 1830

General characteristics
- Tons burthen: 298 (bm)
- Propulsion: Sail

Drummore was a merchant ship built at Leith, Scotland in 1830. She transported a military convict to New South Wales.

== Career ==
Under the command of Peter Petrie from Mauritius, she arrived at Sydney on 12 September 1831, with a military convict Michael Costello.

== Citations ==
Citations
