= Manlius (1826 ship) =

History

United Kingdom
- Name: Manlius
- Builder: Quebec
- Launched: 26 April 1826 at Quebec
- Fate: Wrecked 9 December 1834

General characteristics
- Tons burthen: 479, or 4797/94 (bm)
- Length: 121 ft 0 in (36.88 m)
- Beam: 29 ft 8 in (9.04 m)

Manlius was launched at Quebec in 1826. She made three voyages transporting convicts: one to Port Jackson and two to Van Dieman's Land. She then started trading between Britain and Canada. She was wrecked, with loss of life, on 9 December 1834.

== Career ==
Manlius first entered Lloyd's Register (LR) in 1827. She had arrived at Gravesend from Quebec on 30 August 1826; she had cleared customs in Quebec on 8 July.

Year	Master	Owner	Trade	Source
1827	Wood; W.Johnson	Captain & Co. Somes & Co.	London	LR

=== 1st convict voyage (1827) ===
Captain William Johnson sailed from the Downs on 11 April 1827, bound for Port Jackson. On 15 May her First Mate drowned. Manlius arrived on 11 August. She had embarked 176 male convicts and she suffered two convict deaths on her voyage. On 14 September she sailed for Batavia.

=== 2nd convict voyage (1828) ===
Captain William Johnson sailed from London on 16 July 1828, bound for Van Dieman's Land. Manlius arrived on 9 November. She had embarked 176 male convicts and she suffered one convict death on the voyage. A detachment from the 63 Regiment of Foot provided the guard. On 12 December Manlius sailed for Sydney. On 4 June she was at St Helena on her way to London, having come via Batavia.

=== 3rd convict voyage (1830) ===
Captain Johnson sailed from Sheerness on 23 April 1830, bound for Van Dieman's Land. Manlius arrived on 12 August. She had embarked 200 convicts and had suffered no convict deaths on the voyage.

Year	Master	Owner	Trade	Source
1831	W.Johnson; N.Lyons	Somes	London–New South Wales	LR
1833	N.Lyons	Somes Bros.	Cork–Quebec	LR
1834	J.Lemon	Dunn & Co.	Liverpool	LR; homeport Belfast

== Fate ==
Manlius, of Belfast, Lemon, master, was wrecked on 9 December 1834 in Placentia Bay. Lemon, eight crew members, and four passengers were lost. Ten men survived; Emma took four to Portsmouth, but six remained at Newfoundland due to severe frostbite. Manlius had been on a voyage from Quebec City to the Clyde.
