= Fanny (1810 ship) =

History

United Kingdom
- Name: Fanny
- Owner: F. Chalmers & Co.
- Builder: Samuel & Daniel Brent, Rotherhithe
- Launched: 1 March 1810
- Fate: Last listed 1822

General characteristics
- Tons burthen: 43172/94, or 432 (bm)
- Length: 114 ft 2 in (34.8 m)
- Beam: 29 ft 2 in (8.9 m)
- Propulsion: Sail
- Armament: 1810:2 × 9-pounder guns + 14 × 12-pounder carronades; 1816:12 × 6-pounder guns + 8 × 18-pounder carronades

Fanny was a merchant ship built on the River Thames, England in 1810. She was a West Indiaman but made one voyage transporting convicts from England to Australia. On her return she reverted to trading with the West Indies. She apparently burnt in 1817, but may have been salvaged. She was last listed in 1822.

== Career ==
Fanny appears in Lloyd's Register in 1810 with Blackburn, master, Chalmers, owner, and trade London–Martinique.

Under the command of John Wallis and surgeon William McDonald, she departed the Downs on 25 August 1815 and arrived in Sydney on 18 January 1816. She had embarked 174 male convicts and there were three convict deaths en route.

Year	Master	Owner	Trade	Source & notes
1816	Wallace	Buckle	London–New South Wales	Lloyd's Register
1816	Wallace	Chalmers	London–Martinique	Register of Shipping

Fanny sailed from Port Jackson on 2 March 1816, bound for Batavia. She must have returned because she sailed from Port Jackson for the last time on 30 March 1817, bound for Batavia.

Neither Lloyd's Register nor the Register of Shipping published in 1817. Fanny reappeared in the 1818 volume of the Register of Shipping with Campbell, master, Chalmers, owner, and trade London–Jamaica. She was not in the 1818 or subsequent volumes of Lloyd's Register.

== Fate ==
There is ambiguity about Fanny's subsequent career.

Fanny sailed from Gravesend on 30 March 1817, bound for Jamaica. On 10 May she was at Madeira. On 11 July 1817, Lloyd's List reported that Fanny, Campbell, master, had been sailing from London to Jamaica, when she caught fire off Cape Tiberoon (Cape Tiburon). She was totally burnt, but her crew and passengers had been saved and had arrived at Kingston.

However, Fanny, Campbell, master, was next reported on her way from Trinidad to Liverpool when she put into St Thomas's on 3 June 1818 in a leaky condition. She unloaded her cargo but reportedly only required re-caulking and was expected to resume her voyage around 26 June. She arrived at Liverpool on 30 August.

Although the Register of Shipping carried Fanny, Campbell, master, into the 1822 volume, there was no further listing of Fanny, Campbell, master, in Lloyd's List in 1819 or 1820.
