= Forth (1814 ship) =

History
- Name: New Carmo
- Builder: M.Smith, Howrah, Calcutta
- Launched: 1814
- Renamed: Forth (1829)
- Fate: Still sailing 1839

General characteristics
- Tons burthen: 395, or 397, or 401, or 430 (bm)
- Propulsion: Sail

Forth was a 397-ton sailing ship built in 1814 at Calcutta, British India under the name New Carmo. She was sold at Manila, but then repurchased at Calcutta and renamed Forth. In 1830 she made one voyage transporting convicts to New South Wales. Forth was still operating out of Calcutta in 1839.

== Career ==
A letter dated 24 December 1824, at San Blas, reported that New Carmo, Proudfoot, master, from Bengal, had been seized on suspicion of having taken on board Spanish property at Panama. New Carmo had been on her way from Calcutta to Mazatlán and put in at San Bias to repair damages. The Commandant there initially gave Proudfoot permission to effect the repairs, but two days later attempted to seize her. His excuse for his action was suspicion of contraband.

In 1828 New Carmo was registered at Calcutta with D.Proudfoot, master, and Mendietta & Co., owners. She was not listed in 1829.

Forth first appeared in Lloyd's Register (LR) in the issue for 1829.

Year	Master	Owner	Trade	Source
1829	Proodfoot	Palmer	London–New South Wales	LR

Under the command of David Proudfoot, master, and William Clifford, surgeon, Forth sailed from Cork, Ireland on 1 January 1830, and arrived at Port Jackson on 20 April 1830. She had embarked 118 male convicts; three convicts died on the voyage. Two officers and 20 other ranks of the 17th Regiment of Foot provided the guard. (Note: The 17th Foot was later involved in two documented massacres of Aboriginal people. These were reprisals for attacks on Europeans.)

Forth left Port Jackson on 13 June 1830 bound for Singapore and Calcutta.

Year	Master	Owner	Trade	Source
1831	Proodfoot	Palmer	Cork	LR

On 24 September 1831 Forth was at Calcutta, loading for China.

Forth was last listed in Lloyd's Register in 1833, with data unchanged from 1831. She apparently had returned to Calcutta as she was sailing from Calcutta in 1839.
