= Fanny (1829 ship) =

History

United Kingdom
- Name: Fanny
- Builder: J.A. Currie, Sulkea, Calcutta
- Launched: 26 August 1829
- Fate: Still sailing out of Calcutta in 1839

General characteristics
- Type: Barque
- Tons burthen: 275, or 280 (bm)
- Propulsion: Sail

Fanny was a merchant ship built at Calcutta, British India, in 1829. She made one voyage transporting convicts from England to Australia. She was still sailing in 1839.

== Career ==
Fanny first appeared in Lloyd's Register (LR) in 1832 with Currie, master, M'Killop, owner, and trade London–New South Wales.

Under the command of Henry Sherwood and surgeons Francis Logan and William Marshall, she departed The Downs on 29 July 1832 and arrived in Sydney on 2 February 1833. She embarked 106 female convicts, eight of whom died en route.
