= Convict ships to Tasmania =

Ships transporting British convicts

Indefatigable arrived at Hobart Town in 1812 and was the first vessel to transport convicts to Van Diemen's Land (now Tasmania). There was a break until 1818 when Minerva arrived. Thereafter one or more vessels arrived each year until 26 May 1853 when St Vincent became the last to arrive. In some cases the vessels concerned simply transferred convicts from Port Jackson.

== A ==
Name	Date of arrival	Sailed from	Notes
Admiral Cockburn (1814 ship)		Port Jackson	
Albion (1813 ship)	21 October 1823	England	
Andromeda (1819)	28 February 1827	London	
Asia (1813 ship)	30 November 1827	London	
Asia (1815 ship)	17 August 1827	Portsmouth	
Asia (1817 ship)	19 January 1824	The Downs	
Asia (1818 ship)	21 February 1836	Sheerness	
Aurora (1816 ship)	7 October 1835	The Downs	
Augusta Jessie (1834 ship)	27 September 1834	Portsmouth	First convict voyage to Van Diemen's Land (VDL)
Augusta Jessie	6 December 1838		Second convict voyage to VDL

== B ==
Name	Date of arrival	Sailed from	Notes
Bardaster (1833 ship)	13 January 1836	Portsmouth	
Barrosa (1811 ship)	13 January 1842	Sheerness	Her first convict voyage to Van Diemen's Land
Barrosa (1811 ship)	5 September 1844	Dublin	Her second convict voyage to Van Diemen's Land
Bengal Merchant (1812 ship)	10 August 1828	Plymouth	
Bheemoolah (1808 ship)	23 December 1843	London	
Blenheim (1834 ship)	16 July 1837	Woolwich	
Borneo (1817 ship)	8 October 1828		
Brothers (1815 ship)	15 April 1824	The Downs	
Bussorah Merchant (1818 ship)	18 January 1830	The Downs	

== C ==
Name	Date of arrival	Sailed from	Notes
Caledonia (1815 ship)	17 November 1820	Portsmouth	Her first convict voyage to Van Diemen's Land
Caledonia	6 November 1822	Portsmouth	Her second convict voyage to Van Diemen's Land
Castle Forbes (1818 ship)	29 February 1820	Port Jackson	
Chapman (1777 ship)	27 July 1824	England	Her first convict voyage to Van Diemen's Land
Chapman	7 October 1826	London	Her second convict voyage to Van Diemen's Land
Claudine (1811 ship)	15 December 1821	Woolwich	
Clyde (1820 ship)	18 December 1830	Portsmouth	
Competitor (1813 ship)	3 August 1823	England	
Cornwall (1810 ship)	11 June 1851	Ireland	
HMS Coromandel (1815)	12 March 1823	England	
Coromandel (1820 ship)	26 October 1838		
Countess of Harcourt (1811 ship)	27 July 1821	Portsmouth	
Currency Lass (1826 schooner)			Moved convicts between Hobart and Sydney in the 1830s

== D ==
Name	Date of arrival	Sailed from	Notes
David Clark (1816 ship)	4 October 1841	Plymouth	
HMS Dromedary (1806)	10 January 1820		

== E ==
Name	Date of arrival	Sailed from	Notes
Earl Grey (1835 ship)	14 January 1843	Plymouth	Her first convict voyage to Van Diemen's Land
Earl Grey	9 May 1850	Dublin	Her second convict voyage to Van Diemen's Land
Eden (1826 ship)	22 December 1836	Portsmouth	
Egyptian	24 August 1839	Sheerness	Her first convict voyage to Van Diemen's Land
Egyptian	12 December 1840	Dublin	Her second convict voyage to Van Diemen's Land
Eliza (1804 ship)	29 May 1831	Portsmouth	
Eliza (1815 ship)	24 February 1830	London	
Emperor Alexander (1813 Chepstow ship)	12 August 1833	Sheerness	
Emu (1812 ship)			Captured on way to Van Diemen's Land before she could land her convicts
Enchantress (1828 ship)	31 July 1833	Portsmouth	
England (1813 ship)	18 July 1832	Sheerness	

== F ==
Name	Date of arrival	Sailed from	Notes
Fairlie (1810 ship)	3 July 1852	Dublin, via the Cape	

== G ==
Name	Date of arrival	Sailed from	Notes
George III (ship)	12 March 1835	Woolwich	Wrecked with heavy loss of live before she could disembark her convicts
George Hibbert (1803 ship)	1 December 1834	The Downs	
Georgiana (1826 ship)	20 April 1829	Plymouth	Her first convict voyage to Van Diemen's Land
Georgiana	1 February 1833	Portsmouth	Her second convict voyage to Van Diemen's Land
Gilmore (1824 ship)	22 March 1832	London	Her first convict voyage to Van Diemen's Land
Gilmore	24 January 1839	Spithead	Her second convict voyage to Van Diemen's Land
Governor Ready (1825 ship)	31 March 1827	Plymouth	
Grenada (1810 ship)	9 January 1827	Portsmouth	
Guildford (1810 ship)	28 October 1820	Portsmouth	

== H ==
Name	Date of arrival	Sailed from	Notes
Henry (1819 ship)	9 February 1825	London	
Henry Porcher (1817 ship)	24 April 1833	London	Her first convict voyage to Van Diemen's Land
Henry Porcher	15 November 1836	Portsmouth	Her second convict voyage to Van Diemen's Land
Hibernia (1810 ship)	11 May 1819	Portsmouth	
Hooghly (1819 ship)			
Hindostan (1819 ship)	7 December 1839	London	Her first convict voyage to Van Diemen's Land
Hindostan	19 January 1841	London	Her second convict voyage to Van Diemen's Land
HMS Howe	10 January 1820	England	

== I, J, & K ==
Name	Date of arrival	Sailed from	Notes
Indefatigable (1799 ship)	19 October 1812	England	First ship to bring convicts to VDL
Isabella (1818 ship)	14 November 1833	Plymouth	
John (1809 ship)	28 January 1831	London	First voyage to VDL
John	1 December 1833	Spithead	Second voyage to VDL
John Barry (1814 ship)	11 August 1834	England	
Katherine Stewart Forbes (1818 ship)	16 July 1832	England	

== L ==
Name	Date of arrival	Sailed from	Notes
Lady Castlereagh (1803 EIC ship)	11 June 1818	England via Port Jackson	Landed some convicts at Port Jackson and took the bulk of them on to Hobart
Lady Denison			Transferred convicts between Australian penal colonies
Lady Harewood (1791 ship)	28 July 1829	London	
Lady Kennaway (1816 ship)	13 February 1835	Portsmouth & Cork	First convict voyage to Tasmania
Lady Kennaway	28 May 1851	Portsmouth	Second convict voyage to Tasmania
HMS Lady Nelson (1798)			Transferred convicts and former convicts between Australian ports
Lady Nugent (1814 ship)	11 November 1836	Sheerness	
Lady Ridley (1813 ship)	27 June 1821	England	
Larkins (1808 ship)	19 October 1831	The Downs	
Layton	9 October 1827	Plymouth	First convict voyage to VDL
Layton	10 December 1835	Sheerness	Second convict voyage to VDL
Layton	1 September 1841	Lonson	Third convict voyage to VDL
London (1832 ship)	1 May 1842	London	First convict voyage
London	10 March 1851	Dublin	Second convict voyage to Tasmania
Lord Melville	17 December 1818		
Lord Hungerford (1814 ship)	26 December 1821	England	
Lord Lyndoch (1814 ship)	18 November 1831	Sheerness	First convict voyage to Tasmania
Lord Lyndoch	20 August 1836	London	Second convict voyage to Tasmania
Lord Lyndoch	5 February 1841	London	Third convict voyage to Tasmania
Lord William Bentinck (1828 Bristol ship)	26 August 1838	Portsmouth	
Lord William Bentinck (1828 Yarmouth ship)	28 August 1832	Portsmouth	
Lotus (1826 ship)	16 May 1833	London	

== M ==
Name	Date of arrival	Sailed from	Notes
Maitland (1811 ship)	3 March 1844	Norfolk Island	Her first convict voyage to Tasmania
Maitland	27 October 1846	London	Her second convict voyage to Tasmania
Majestic (1829 ship)	22 January 1829	London	
Malabar (1804 ship)	21 October 1821	Gravesend	
Mangles (1803 ship)	2 August 1835	Portsmouth	
Manlius (1826 ship)	9 November 1828	London	Her first convict voyage to Tasmania
Manlius	12 August 1830	Sheerness	Her second convict voyage to Tasmania
Maria (1798 ship)	1 December 1820	London	
Mary (1811 Ipswich ship)	5 October 1823	London	Her first convict voyage to Tasmania
Mary	10 April 1830	London	Her second convict voyage to Tasmania
Mary	19 October 1831	London	Her third convict voyage to Tasmania
Mary Ann (1807 Batavia ship)	2 May 1822	Dartmouth	
Medina (1811 ship)	14 September 1825	The Downs	
Medway (1810 ship)	21 October 1821	Land's End	
Mellish (1819 ship)	22 September 1830	Spithead	
Minerva (1805 ship)	7 June 1818	Cork	Second ship to bring convicts to VDL
Moffat	9 May 1834	Plymouth	Her first convict voyage to Tasmania
Moffat	1 April 1838	Portsmouth	Her second convict voyage to Tasmania
Moffat	20 November 1842	Portsmouth	Her third convict voyage to Tasmania
Morley (1811 ship)	28 August 1820	London	

== N, O, & P ==
Name	Date of arrival	Sailed from	Notes
Neptune (1815 ship)	18 January 1838	Sheerness	Her first convict voyage to Tasmania
Neptune	5 April 1850	England & Bermuda	Her second convict voyage to Tasmania
Norfolk (1814 ship)	28 August 1835	Sheerness	
Ocean (1794 ship)	1804	Port Phillip	
Phoenix (1810 ship)	20 May 1822	Portsmouth	
Phoenix (1798 ship)	21 July 1824	England	
Princess Charlotte (1813 Sunderland ship)	8 November 1824	London	
Prince Regent (1811 Shields ship)	10 January 1830	Sheerness	
Prince Regent (1811 Rochester ship)	2 January 1842	Kingstown (Dublin)	

== R ==
Name	Date of arrival	Sailed from	Notes
Roslin Castle (1819 ship)	16 December 1828	The Downs	
Royal George (1820 ship)	18 October 1830	Portsmouth	
Ruby (1800 ship)	c.March 1812	Port Jackson	
Runnymede (1825 ship)	28 March 1840	London	

== S ==
Name	Date of arrival	Sailed from	Notes
Sarah (1819 ship)	29 March 1837	London	
Sir Charles Forbes	18 April 1825	Portsmouth	First convict voyage to Tasmania
Sir Charles Forbes	3 January 1827	London	Second convict voyage to Tasmania
Sir Charles Forbes	27 July 1830	Plymouth	Third convict voyage to Tasmania
Sir Godfrey Webster (1799 ship)	30 December 1823	London	
Sir Robert Seppings (ship)	8 July 1852	Woolwich	220 female convicts (1 died at sea)
Somersetshire (1810 ship)	30 May 1842	Plymouth	
Stakesby (1814 ship)	4 September 1833	Spithead	
Surry (1811 ship)	14 December 1829	London	Her first convict voyage to Van Diemen's Land
Surrey	17 May 1836	Cork	Her second convict voyage to Van Diemen's Land
Surrey	11 August 1842	The Downs	Her third convict voyage to Van Diemen's Land
Susan (1813 ship)	21 November 1837	London	Her first convict voyage to Van Diemen's Land
Susan	25 July 1842	Plymouth	Her second convict voyage to Van Diemen's Land

== T, W, & Y ==
Name	Date of arrival	Sailed from	Notes
Thames (1818 ship)	1 November 1829	London	
HMS Tortoise (1807)	19 February 1842	Plymouth	
Waterloo (1815 ship)	20 November 1834	Portsmouth	
Westmoreland (1832 ship)	3 December 1836	Woolwich	
William Miles (1808 ship)	29 July 1828	The Downs	
Woodford (1819 ship)	22 November 1826	London	Her first convict voyage to Van Diemen's Land
Woodford	25 August 1828	Portsmouth	Her second convict voyage to Van Diemen's Land
Woodman (1808 ship)	29 April 1826	Sheerness	
York (1819 ship)	28 August 1829	London	Her first convict voyage to Van Diemen's Land
York	29 December 1832	Plymouth	Her second convict voyage to Van Diemen's Land
