= Brixton (ship) =

Several ships have been named Brixton for Brixton:

- Brixton was built in the United States of America in 1802 under a different name, with sources disagreeing on where. The British Royal Navy seized her in 1805 and she was sold in prize. She then traded widely, sailing to the West Indies, Canada, Bengal, Australia, and Russia. Between 1835 and 1842 she made two voyages to the British Southern Whale Fishery as a whaling ship, and was last listed in 1842.
- Brixton (1827 ship), of 1,157 GRT, was built by SP Austin and Sons, as a collier for the Southern Metropolitan Gas Co., of London. She was sunk on 15 August 1840 off Orford Ness by a mine.
- Brixton (1946 ship), of 1,635 GRT, was launched by SP Austin, Ltd., Sunderland, as a collier for the Southern Metropolitan Gas Co., of London. In 1954 she survived a collision in the Thames with Planter. She became successively Brunetto (1962), Ignia Zeta (1978), and Piero M. She arrived at La Spezia in 1978 for breaking up.
