= List of ships named Bussorah =

Several ships have been named Bussorah for Basra:

- Bussorah Merchant (1818 ship) was a merchant ship built at Calcutta. She made three voyages transporting convicts from England and Ireland to Australia and later carried emigrants and other passengers to Australia. she was last listed in 1865.
- Bussorah Packet, of 237 or 300 tons (bm), was built at Pegu. She appeared on a list of vessels registered at Calcutta in January 1811; at the time her master and owner was John Clements. She was lost in 1812. John Clements died on 10 August 1812.
- SS Bussorah (1862) of 622 tons (bm), was a screw iron steamer launched at Glasgow in 1862 for the British India Steam Navigation Company. She was lost in 1863 early into her maiden voyage, bound for Madras. She was presumed foundered off Islay, Inner Hebrides with the loss of all hands.
- Bussorah (1867 ship), of 395 NRT, was a sailing barque launched at Sunderland. On 14 November 1885 she stranded off Calais while carrying coal from Newcastle to Bahia.
- SS Bussorah (1881), of 1,292 NRT, was an iron screw steamer launched at Sunderland for the Persian Gulf Steam Ship Company. Between 1895 and 1900 her name was Josip Brailli. Bussorah wrecked on 6 May 1903 in the Baltic while carrying timber and pig iron from Sundsvall to Manchester.
