= Boddingtons (ship) =

A number of sailing ships have been named Boddingtons or Boddington:

- Boddington (1781 ship), a 331-ton ship built upon the River Thames in 1781, that transported convicts to Sydney in 1793. She wrecked on the Thames in 1805.
- Boddingtons (1793), a 301-ton ship built upon the River Thames in 1793, that transported convicts to Sydney in 1828.
