= Doncaster (ship) =

Several vessels have been named Doncaster, for Doncaster'

- Doncaster (1792 ship) was launched in 1792 at South Shields. She spent many years as a transport. It was during this period that she became, during an experimental trial, the first British ship to be propelled by a propeller. Later, she traded across the North Atlantic with Quebec and north. She was wrecked in ice in 1835 off Cape North, Cape Breton Island.
- Doncaster (1825 ship) was launched on the River Thames in 1825. Early in her career she carried emigrants to Australia. She made other voyages to Van Diemen's Land and New South Wales, but also traded as a West Indiaman. She was wrecked on 17 July 1836 on the coast of south Africa while sailing from Île de France (Mauritius) to London under a license from the British East India Company (EIC).

== See also ==
- HMS Doncaster (1916), a Racecourse-class minesweeper, sold in 1922.
