= List of shipwrecks in February 1837 =

The list of shipwrecks in February 1837 includes ships sunk, foundered, wrecked, grounded, or otherwise lost during February 1837.

== 1 February ==
List of shipwrecks: 1 February 1837
Ship	State	Description
Nova	Belgium	The ship was wrecked on Money Key, off the Berry Islands. Her crew were rescued. She was on a voyage from Antwerp to New York and New Orleans, Louisiana, United States.
Rimsdalshorn	Hamburg	The ship capsized at Cuxhaven. She was on a voyage from Hamburg to Jersey, Channel Islands.

== 2 February ==
List of shipwrecks: 2 February 1837
Ship	State	Description
Gratitude	United Kingdom	The brigantine was wrecked at Liscomb, Nova Scotia, British North America with the loss of all but her captain. She was on a voyage from St. John's, Newfoundland to Halifax, Nova Scotia.
Truckford	United Kingdom	The ship was driven ashore and wrecked north of the Happisburgh Lighthouse, Norfolk. Her crew were rescued. She was on a voyage from Newcastle upon Tyne, Northumberland to Ipswich, Suffolk.

== 3 February ==
List of shipwrecks: 3 February 1837
Ship	State	Description
Margaret and Peggy	United Kingdom	The ship ran aground in the River Vartry at Wicklow and was wrecked.
Walter	United Kingdom	The ship was driven ashore in the Delaware River.
William	United Kingdom	The ship was wrecked at Langness, near Castletown, Isle of Man. Her crew were rescued. She was on a voyage from Bangor to Newcastle upon Tyne, Northumberland.

== 4 February ==
List of shipwrecks: 4 February 1837
Ship	State	Description
Betty	United Kingdom	The ship was wrecked at Killala, County Louth.
Frankfort	United Kingdom	The ship was driven ashore nearMundesley, Norfolk.Her crew were rescued. She was on a voyage from Newcastle upon Tyne, Northumberland, to Ipswich, Suffolk.

== 5 February ==
List of shipwrecks: 5 February 1837
Ship	State	Description
Alessandro	Kingdom of the Two Sicilies	The brig was driven ashore and wrecked about 1 nautical mile (1.9 km) east of Roche's Point Lighthouse, County Cork, United Kingdom. She was on a voyage from Palermo to Glasgow, Renfrewshire, United Kingdom.
Bessy	United Kingdom	The ship collided with Sarah (United Kingdom) and foundered in the North Sea off Scarborough, Yorkshire. Her crew were rescued.
Enchantress	United Kingdom	The ship was struck a reef off Bermuda and sank. All on board were rescued. She was on a voyage from Liverpool, Lancashire to New York.
Maria	United Kingdom	The ship was driven ashore and wrecked in Ballyteague Bay. She was on a voyage from the Cape of Good Hope to Dublin.
Orme	United Kingdom	The ship foundered in the North Sea off Whitby, Yorkshire. She was on a voyage from Newcastle upon Tyne, Northumberland to London.
St. Michael	United Kingdom	The ship was wrecked on the Shipwash Sand, in the North Sea off the coast of Essex with the loss of her captain. She was on a voyage from Leer, Kingdom of Hanover to London.
Vine	United Kingdom	The ship was wrecked on the Upgang Rock, off Whitby, Yorkshire. She was on a voyage from Newcastle upon Tyne to London.

== 6 February ==
List of shipwrecks: 6 February 1837
Ship	State	Description
Betsey	United Kingdom	The ship was driven ashore and wrecked at Ballyteague, County Galway. She was on a voyage from Catania, Sicily to Glasgow, Renfrewshire.
Margaret and Peggy	United Kingdom	The ship was driven ashore and sank at Wicklow.
Victory	United States	The ship was driven ashore and wrecked on Bodie Island, North Carolina. Her crew were rescued. She was on a voyage from Jamaica to Norfolk, Virginia.
Vine	United Kingdom	The ship struck the Upgang Rock, off Whitby, Yorkshire and sank. Her crew were rescued. She was on a voyage from Newcastle upon Tyne, Northumberland to London.

== 7 February ==
List of shipwrecks: 7 February 1837
Ship	State	Description
Cartha	United Kingdom	The ship was abandoned in the Atlantic Ocean (35°25′N 53°20′W). Her crew were rescued by Elizabeth (United Kingdom). Cartha was on a voyage from the Clyde to New York.
Cossack	United Kingdom	The ship ran aground on the Margate Sand and sank. Her crew were rescued. She was on a voyage from Cardiff, Glamorgan to London.
Harriett	United States	The ship was driven ashore at Delfzijl, Groningen, Netherlands. She was on a voyage from Emden, Kingdom of Hanover to an American port.
Johannesberg	Kingdom of Hanover	The ship was driven ashore at Delfzijl. She was on a voyage from Emden to an American port.
Katherine Jackson	United Kingdom	The ship sprang a leak and was beached at New Orleans, Louisiana, United States. She was on a voyage from New Orleans to Liverpool, Lancashire.
Leith and Liverpool Packet	United Kingdom	The ship was driven ashore in Sligo Bay. She was on a voyage from Sligo to Glasgow, Renfrewshire.
St. Michael	Kingdom of Hanover	The ship was lost on the Shipwash Sand, in the North Sea off the coast of Essex with the loss of all but two of her crew. She was on a voyage from Leer to London, United Kingdom.

== 8 February ==
List of shipwrecks: 8 February 1837
Ship	State	Description
Bon Père	France	The ship was driven ashore and wrecked on Fire Island, New York, United States. She was on a voyage from Marseille, Bouches-du-Rhône to New York City.
Bristol	United Kingdom	The ship ran aground and capsized in the River Towy at Blackpool, Carmarthen. She was later righted and put back to Carmarthen.
Jane	United Kingdom	The ship was driven ashore and wrecked at Dungarvan, County Waterford. She was on a voyage from Newport, Monmouthshire to Waterford.
Mary	United Kingdom	The ship was driven ashore at Cádiz, Spain. She was later refloated and taken in to Cadiz.
Roncalesa	Spanish Navy	The warship was run into by Harriet ( (United Kingdom of Great Britain and Ireland) New South Wales) and sank at Cádiz. No crew were on board.
Volant	(United Kingdom of Great Britain and Ireland) Gibraltar	The ship was sunk at Cádiz by another vessel being driven into her.

== 9 February ==
List of shipwrecks: 9 February 1837
Ship	State	Description
Autumn	United Kingdom	The ship was driven ashore south of Workington, Cumberland. She was refloated in March and taken into Workington in a severely damaged condition.
Eliza	United Kingdom	The ship ran aground on the Herd Sand, in the North Sea off the coast of County Durham and was damaged. She was refloated.
Jubilee	United Kingdom	The ship was driven ashore and severely damaged at Whitburn, County Durham. She was refloated on 18 February and taken into Sunderland, County Durham.
Laurency	France	The ship foundered off the Isle of May, Cape Verde Islands. Her crew were rescued.
Sir H. Davy	United Kingdom	The ship struck Crimston Rock, off Lindisfarne, Northumberland and sank. Her crew were rescued She was on a voyage from Newcastle upon Tyne, Northumberland to "Warren".
Spanish Packet	United Kingdom	The ship was wrecked on the Black Rock, off the coast of County Wexford with the loss of all but two of her crew. She was on a voyage from Genoa, Kingdom of Sardinia to Liverpool, Lancashire.
St. Sebastian	United Kingdom	The ship was driven ashore and wrecked at Swansea, Glamorgan. She was on a voyage from Gloucester to Swansea.

== 10 February ==
List of shipwrecks: 10 February 1837
Ship	State	Description
Alice	United Kingdom	The ship was wrecked on a reef in the Turks Islands. Her crew were rescued. She was on a voyage from Grenada to the Turks Islands and Virginia, United States.
Amelia	(United Kingdom of Great Britain and Ireland) British North America	The schooner was abandoned in the Atlantic Ocean (37°27′N 72°48′W). She was on a voyage from Wilmington, Delaware, United States to Saint Vincent.
Bon Accord	United Kingdom	The brig was driven ashore in Dunwordy Bay. She was on a voyage from Marseille, Bouches-du-Rhône, France to Glasgow, Renfrewshire.
Collins	United Kingdom	The ship collided with Hero (United Kingdom) and was driven ashore at Harwich, Essex. She was later refloated and taken into Harwich.
Enterprise	United Kingdom	The brig ran aground and sank off Sheringham, Norfolk. Her crew survived.
Irwell	United Kingdom	The ship was driven ashore at Harwich, Essex. She was on a voyage from Ipswich, Suffolk to Leith, Lothian. Irwell was later refloated and taken in to Harwich.
Juno	United Kingdom	The sloop was wrecked in the River Tay with the loss of all hands. She was on a voyage from Dundee, Forfarshire to London.
Mersey	United Kingdom	The ship foundered in the Irish Sea off the coast of County Wicklow with the loss of all hands. She was on a voyage from Liverpool, Lancashire to London. Her stern came ashore at Holyhead, Anglesey on 21 February.
Providence	United Kingdom	The ship was driven ashore and wrecked in the Bay of Dunaverty. She was on a voyage from Sligo to Glasgow, Renfrewshire.
Sir William Starner	United Kingdom	The ship was driven ashore at Harrington, Cumberland. She was on a voyage from Dublin to Harrington.
St. George	United Kingdom	The ship was driven ashore at Maryport, Cumberland. She was on a voyage from Dublin to Maryport. St George was refloated the next day and taken in to Maryport.
Venus	United Kingdom	The ship collided with another vessel and was abandoned in the North Sea off the mouth of the Humber.

== 11 February ==
List of shipwrecks: 11 February 1837
Ship	State	Description
Catherine	United Kingdom	The ship was driven ashore at Arvert, Charente-Maritime, France. Her crew were rescued. She was on a voyage from Viana do Castelo, Portugal to Bordeaux, Gironde, France.
Iduna	Denmark	The schooner was abandoned off the coast of Vendée, France. She was on a voyage from Cowes, Isle of Wight, United Kingdom to Porto, Portugal.
Jean Maria	France	The ship was wrecked in Chale Bay with the loss of two of her five crew. She was on a voyage from "Pouilley" to Abbeville, Somme.
Lady Catherine	United Kingdom	The ship was driven ashore and wrecked on the Isle of Whithorn, Wigtownshire. Her crew were rescued. She was on a voyage from Belfast, County Antrim to Dumfries.
Progress	United Kingdom	The brig collided with Eliza (United Kingdom) and sank off Grimsby, Lincolnshire. She was on a voyage from Stockton-on-Tees, County Durham to London. Progress was refloated on 20 February and taken in to Grimsby.
Resolution	France	The ship was wrecked near Saint-Martin-de-Ré, Charente-Maritime. She was on a voyage from Stettin to Bordeaux, Gironde.
Robert and Hannah	United Kingdom	The sloop was driven ashore and severely damaged at Goswick, Northumberland. She was on a voyage from Berwick upon Tweed, Northumberland to Grangemouth, Stirlingshire. Robert and Hannah was refloated the next day with assistance from HMRC Mermaid ( Board of Customs) and taken into Berwick upon Tweed.
Stamper	United Kingdom	The ship was driven ashore at Maryport, Cumberland.
St. Jacques	France	The sloop was driven ashore and wrecked at Arvert with the loss of two of her crew. She was on a voyage from Newcastle upon Tyne, Northumberland, United Kingdom to Bordeaux.
The Deft	United Kingdom	The schooner foundered off South Shields, County Durham. She was refloated on 23 February and taken into North Shields.

== 12 February ==
List of shipwrecks: 12 February 1837
Ship	State	Description
Pomona	United Kingdom	The ship was driven ashore at South Shields, County Durham.
Skimmer	United Kingdom	The barque was wrecked near Judda, Habesh Eyalet. She was on a voyage from Suez, Egypt to Calcutta, India.

== 13 February ==
List of shipwrecks: 13 February 1837
Ship	State	Description
Countryman	United Kingdom	The ship was wrecked in Dromore Bay. Her crew were rescued.
Estelle	France	The ship was wrecked on the Bahamas Bank. Her crew were rescued. She was on a voyage from Havre de Grâce, Seine-Inférieure to Veracruz, Mexico.

== 14 February ==
List of shipwrecks: 14 February 1837
Ship	State	Description
Adeona	United Kingdom	The ship was driven ashore and damaged at King's Lynn, Norfolk. She was on a voyage from Hartlepool, County Durham to King's Lynn.

== 15 February ==
List of shipwrecks: 15 February 1837
Ship	State	Description
Glasgow	United States	The ship struck the Barrels Rocks, off the coast of County Wicklow, United Kingdom with the loss of about eighteen of the 113 people on board. She was on a voyage from Liverpool, Lancashire to New York. Eighty-eight people were rescued by Alicia (United Kingdom).
Harbinger	United Kingdom	The ship was wrecked at São Pedro, Portugal. Her crew were rescued. She was on a voyage from Falmouth, Cornwall to Livorno, Grand Duchy of Tuscany.
Ocean	United Kingdom	The ship was abandoned whilst on a voyage from Cardiff, Glamorgan to Waterford. Her crew were rescued by the steamship Ocean (United Kingdom). She was later towed in to Dundalk, County Louth by the steamship City of Liverpool (United Kingdom).
Tobias and Helena	Netherlands	The ship was wrecked on Texel, North Holland. She wason a voyage from Stettin to Amsterdam, North Holland.
William and Mary	United Kingdom	The ship was driven ashore and severely damaged at Maryport, Cumberland.

== 16 February ==
List of shipwrecks: 16 February 1837
Ship	State	Description
Constantia	Hamburg	The ship was wrecked on the Horas Reef, off Veracruz, Mexico. All on board were rescued.
Jenny	United Kingdom	The ship capsized and sank off Allonby, Cumberland. Her crew were rescued.
Loughborough	United Kingdom	The schooner struck the Coulson Rock, off Lindisfarne, Northumberland and was consequently beached at Berwick upon Tweed, Northumberland. She was on a voyage from Newcastle upon Tyne, Northumberland to Dundee, Forfarshire. Loughborough was later refloated and taken into Berwick upon Tweed.
William Kelson	United Kingdom	The ship ran ashore at Swanage, Dorset. She was on a voyage from Newfoundland, British North America to Poole, Dorset. William Kelson was refloated on 17 February by HMRC Tartar ( Board of Customs) and taken into Poole.

== 17 February ==
List of shipwrecks: 17 February 1837
Ship	State	Description
Amity	(United Kingdom of Great Britain and Ireland) Jersey	The ship was wrecked on the Coswick Sand Rig. She was on a voyage from Dundee, Forfarshire to Jersey.
Eliza	United Kingdom	The ship sank in the River Ribble. Her crew were rescued. She was on a voyage from Dublin to Workington, Cumberland.
Midas	United Kingdom	The schooner was driven ashore at Buenos Aires, Argentina.
Newburgh	United Kingdom	The schooner struck the Goulstone Rock and was consequently beached at Berwick upon Tweed, Northumberland.

== 18 February ==
List of shipwrecks: 18 February 1837
Ship	State	Description
Amity	United Kingdom	The brig was wrecked on the Kentish Knock. Her crew were rescued. She was on a voyage from Newcastle upon Tyne, Northumberland to Abbeville, Somme, France.
Bognor	United Kingdom	The ship ran aground on the Cork Sand, in the North Sea off the coast of Essex. She was later refloated and taken into Harwich, Essex.
Caroline Therese	Denmark	The ship was wrecked on the coast of Jutland. Her crew were rescued She was on a voyage from Newcastle upon Tyne to Aarhus.
Nancy	United Kingdom	The ship was driven ashore at Howdon, County Durham. She was later refloated but had to be beached.

== 19 February ==
List of shipwrecks: 19 February 1837
Ship	State	Description
Ann	United Kingdom	The schooner was severely damaged at Dundee, Forfarshire.
Ann and Mary	United Kingdom	The ship was driven ashore in Loch Indaal. She was on a voyage from Londonderry to Lough Swilly.
Ann and Resolution	United Kingdom	The brig was severely damaged at Dundee.
Commerce de Boulogne	France	The ship was driven ashore near Calais. She was on a voyage from Newcastle upon Tyne, Northumberland, United Kingdom to Boulogne, Pas-de-Calais.
Corsair	United Kingdom	The ship was wrecked on the Morant Cays. All on board were rescued. She was on a voyage from Port Morant to Port Royal, Jamaica.
Favourite	United Kingdom	The ship was driven ashore at Allonby, Cumberland.
Glasgow	United Kingdom	The ship was driven ashore and wrecked at Peterhead, Aberdeenshire. Her crew survived. She was on a voyage from Glasgow, Renfrewshire to Aberdeen.
Gratitude	United Kingdom	The brig collided with Tay (United Kingdom) and was driven ashore at Dundee.
Hebe	United Kingdom	The sloop was severely damaged at Dundee.
Laurel	United Kingdom	The sloop was driven into Margaret (United Kingdom) and was damaged at Dundee.
Lively	United Kingdom	The ship was driven ashore and severely damaged on the Cevensidan Sands, Carmarthenshire. She was on a voyage from Newport, Monmouthshire to Fowey, Cornwall. Lively was later refloated.
Margaret	United Kingdom	The schooner was damaged at Dundee.
Mischief	United Kingdom	The ship foundered off Maryport, Cumberland.
Orient	United Kingdom	The schooner was driven ashore and wrecked at Peterhead.
Perthshire	United Kingdom	The schooner collided with Tay (United Kingdom) and was driven ashore and damaged at Dundee.
Ranger	United Kingdom	The ship was driven ashore at Maryport, Cumberland. She was refloated in late February and taken in to Workington, Cumberland.
Union	United Kingdom	The sloop was driven into Gratitude and Perthshire (both United Kingdom) and was damaged at Dundee.
William Wallis	United Kingdom	The ship was driven ashore at Aldeburgh, Suffolk. She was on a voyage from South Shields, County Durham to Bordeaux, Gironde, France. William Wallis was later refloated and taken into Harwich, Essex.

== 20 February ==
List of shipwrecks: 20 February 1837
Ship	State	Description
Anne	United Kingdom	The ship was driven ashore and wrecked at Maryport, Cumberland.
Brutus	United Kingdom	The ship was driven ashore in Dowing's Bay.
Favourite	United Kingdom	The ship was driven ashore at Allonby, Cumberland.
Hebe	United Kingdom	The brig sprang a leak and was beached east of Shoreham-by-Sea, Sussex, where she was wrecked. Her crew were rescued. She was on a voyage from Sunderland, County Durham to Shoreham-by-Sea.
Hoffnung	(Denmark) Duchy of Schleswig	The ship was driven ashore on the coast of Jutland. Her crew were rescued. She was on a voyage from Newcastle upon Tyne, Northumberland, United Kingdom to a Schleswig port.
Jupiter	United Kingdom	The ship was driven ashore and damaged at Porthmadog, Caernarfonshire. She was subsequently refloated and put under repair.

== 21 February ==
List of shipwrecks: 21 February 1837
Ship	State	Description
Avon	United Kingdom	The brig was driven ashore near Portsmouth, Hampshire. She was on a voyage from Hartlepool, County Durham to Weymouth, Dorset. She later broke up.
Brutus	United Kingdom	The ship was driven ashore at "Ballyconnell".
Paul Pry	United Kingdom	The brig was wrecked on the Kentish Knock. Her six crew were rescued by Modeste Eugene (France). She was on a voyage from Great Yarmouth, Norfolk to Liverpool, Lancashire.

== 22 February ==
List of shipwrecks: 22 February 1837
Ship	State	Description
Belfast	United Kingdom	The ship struck the Tuskar Rock and sank with the loss of about 25 lives. Survivors were rescued by a fishing smack. Belfast was on a voyage from Liverpool, Lancashire to New York, United States.
Hoffnung	Denmark	The ship sprang a leak and was beached at Nyborg, where she sank.
Jane	United Kingdom	The ship was severely damaged by fire at Bristol, Gloucestershire.
Tagus	United Kingdom	The ship caught fire and sank at New Orleans, Louisiana, United States.

== 23 February ==
List of shipwrecks: 23 February 1837
Ship	State	Description
Cynthia	United Kingdom	The ship was driven ashore on Spurn Point, Yorkshire. She was on a voyage from Hull, Yorkshire to Stockton-on-Tees, County Durham.
Dortenaar	Netherlands	The ship was driven ashore near Dordrecht, South Holland. She was on a voyage from Dordrect to Batavia, Netherlands East Indies.
Emancipation	United Kingdom	The ship struck a sunken wreck in The Swin and foundered. Her crew were rescued. She was on a voyage from Newcastle upon Tyne, Northumberland to London.
Harvey	United Kingdom	The ship was driven ashore at Aberavon, Glamorgan with the loss of a crew member.
Hussey	United Kingdom	The ship foundered in Caernarfon Bay with the loss of all five crew. She was on a voyage from Youghal, County Cork to Swansea, Glamorgan.
John	United Kingdom	The ship was driven ashore and wrecked near Whitby, Yorkshire with the loss of all hands. She was on a voyage from Newcastle upon Tyne to London.
John Leslie	United Kingdom	The barque was driven ashore and wrecked at Horsey, Norfolk. Her crew were rescued. She was on a voyage from London to South Shields, County Durham.
Johns	United Kingdom	The ship was driven ashore in Loch Indaal. She was on a voyage from Londonderry to Dromore, County Down.
Mercury	United States	The ship was wrecked at Cape Cod, Massachusetts, United States. She was on a voyage from Valparaíso, Chile to Boston, Massachusetts.
Swallow	United Kingdom	The ship was driven ashore and wrecked near Kilnsea, Yorkshire. Her crew were rescued. She was on a voyage from Middelburg, Zeeland, Netherlands to Boston, Lincolnshire.
Tagus	United Kingdom	The ship caught fire and sank at New Orleans, Louisiana, United States. She was a total loss.
Thomas Hunter	United Kingdom	The barque capsized at Sunderland, County Durham and was severely damaged.

== 24 February ==
List of shipwrecks: 24 February 1837
Ship	State	Description
Albion	United Kingdom	The ship was driven ashore and wrecked at Cromer, Norfolk. Her crew were rescued.
Andorinha	Portugal	The ship was wrecked in the Vlie. Her crew were rescued. She was on a voyage from Lisbon to Hamburg.
Atlantic	United Kingdom	The ship was driven ashore and wrecked at Mundesley, Norfolk.
Dantzic	Danzig	The ship was driven ashore at Bremen. She was on a voyage from Danzig to New York, United States.
Dove	United Kingdom	The ship sprang a leak whilst on a voyage from Dover, Kent to London. She put into Margate, Kent, where she sank.
Duke of Wellington or Lord Wellington	United Kingdom	The ship foundered in the North Sea off Southwold, Suffolk. Her crew were rescued by Union (United Kingdom). She was on a voyage from Newcastle upon Tyne, Northumberland to London.
Helena	United Kingdom	The ship was driven ashore at the mouth of the Spui. She was on a voyage from Dordrecht, South Holland, Netherlands to Liverpool, Lancashire.
Jane and Mary	United Kingdom	The ship was driven ashore north of Fécamp, Seine-Inférieure, France with the loss of a crew member. She was on a voyage from an Irish port to Great Yarmouth, Norfolk.
John	United Kingdom	The ship was driven ashore near Whitby, Yorkshire with the loss of all hands.
Raby Castle	United Kingdom	The ship was wrecked at Salthouse, Norfolk. Her crew were rescued. She was on a voyage from London to Stockton-on-Tees, County Durham.
Rosehill	United Kingdom	The ship foundered off Southwold. Her crew were rescued by Fala ( Danzig). Rosehill was on a voyage from Newcastle upon Tyne to London.
Rover	United Kingdom	The ship was driven ashore at Dublin. She was refloated on 19 March.
Six Brothers	United Kingdom	The ship capsized in the Humber.
St. Lawrence	United Kingdom	The collier was wrecked on the Middle Sand, in the North Sea off the coast of Essex. Her crew were rescued by Orval (United Kingdom). St. Lawrence was on a voyage from Newcastle upon Tyne, Northumberland to London. She was refloated and taken into Sheerness, Kent.
Supply	United Kingdom	The ship was driven ashore at Swinemünde, Prussia. She was on a voyage from Odesa to Danzig.
Swallow	United Kingdom	The ship was driven ashore and wrecked near Easington, County Durham. Her crew were rescued. She was on a voyage from Stockton-on-Tees, County Durham to Boston, Lincolnshire.
Thomas	United Kingdom	The ship was wrecked near Peterhead, Aberdeenshire. Her crew were rescued. She was on a voyage from Thurso, Caithness to Newcastle upon Tyne.
Zeluco	United Kingdom	The ship was abandoned in the North Sea off Texel, North Holland, Netherlands. She was on a voyage from Sunderland to Middelburg, Zeeland, Netherlands.

== 25 February ==
List of shipwrecks: 25 February 1837
Ship	State	Description
Alendale	United Kingdom	The ship was abandoned off Borkum, Kingdom of Hanover with the loss of her captain. She was on a voyage from Sunderland, County Durham to Hamburg.
Ariadne	United Kingdom	The ship was lost near Scarborough, North Riding of Yorkshire.
Mary	United Kingdom	The ship ran aground on the West Burrows Sand, in the North Sea off the coast of Essex. She was on a voyage from Sunderland, County Durham to London. Mary was refloated and consequently beached at Sheerness, Kent.
Ranger	United Kingdom	The barque ran aground on the West Burrows Sand. She was on a voyage from Peterhead, Aberdeenshire to London. Ranger was refloated and taken in to Sheerness.
Reward	United Kingdom	The ship was wrecked on Heneaga. She was on a voyage from Jamaica to Halifax, Nova Scotia, British North America.
Seaport	United Kingdom	The schooner was driven ashore at Sunderland, County Durham. She was on a voyage from Inverness to Sunderland.
St. Patrick	United Kingdom	The ship was wrecked on Breaksea Point, Glamorgan. She was on a voyage from Courtmacsherry, County Cork to Cardiff, Glamorgan.

== 26 February ==
List of shipwrecks: 26 February 1837
Ship	State	Description
Cove	United Kingdom	The ship was damaged by ice and was abandoned in the Atlantic Ocean. She was on a voyage from Newfoundland to Cork.
Fremling	United Kingdom	The ship was driven ashore at Wells-next-the-Sea, Norfolk. She was on a voyage from Newcastle upon Tyne, Northumberland to Toulon, Var, France.

== 27 February ==
List of shipwrecks: 27 February 1837
Ship	State	Description
Arthur	Prussia	The galiot was driven ashore at Zouteland, Zeeland, Netherlands.
Fremling	United Kingdom	The ship was driven ashore and wrecked east of Wells-next-the-Sea, Norfolk. She was on a voyage from Newcastle upon Tyne, Northumberland to Toulon, Var, France.
John Hunter	United Kingdom	The ship was wrecked on the East Barrow Sand with the loss of a crew member. Survivors were rescued by Elizabeth J and Robert (both United Kingdom). She was on a voyage from Newcastle upon Tyne to London.
Phœnix	United Kingdom	The ship was wrecked at Guadeloupe. She was on a voyage from Liverpool, Lancashire to Barbados.

== Unknown date ==
List of shipwrecks: Unknown date in February 1837
Ship	State	Description
Ann	United Kingdom	The ship was driven ashore near Carrickfergus, County Antrim. She was refloated on 2 March and taken into Maryport, Cumberland.
Aurora	Brazil	The ship was abandoned off the mouth of the Pará River. She was on a voyage from Pernambuco to Maranhão.
Dispatch	United Kingdom	The brig was abandoned in the Atlantic Ocean.
Elizabeth	United Kingdom	The ship was abandoned in the Atlantic Ocean before 15 February. She was on a voyage from Saint John, New Brunswick, British North America to Liverpool, Lancashire.
Euphemia	United KingdomUnited Kingdom	The ship foundered off the Shetland Islands in mid-February.
Genii	United Kingdom	The ship was driven ashore at Great Yarmouth, Norfolk. She was refloated on 18 February.
Hamper	United Kingdom	The ship was driven ashore at Maryport before 19 February.
James Grant	United Kingdom	The ship was abandoned in the Atlantic Ocean. She was towed into Black Sod Bay in a waterlogged condition on 6 April by HMRC Neptune ( Board of Customs).
Jane and Margaret	United States	The ship foundered in the Irish Sea 20 nautical miles (37 km) off Wicklow between 6 and 10 February with the loss of all on board, over 200 lives. She was on a voyage from Liverpool to New York. Her stern came ashore on the Calf of Man, Isle of Man on 17 February. Part of the wreck was towed into the River Mersey by Shamrock (United Kingdom) on 25 February and beached near the Clarence Dock. part of the vessel's port side was washed up on the Isle of Walney, Lancashire in March.
Maria	United Kingdom	The ship was driven ashore and wrecked at Ballyteague, County Galway before 7 February.
Maria	United Kingdom	The ship ran aground on the Cross Sand, in the North Sea. She was on a voyage from Smyrna, Ottoman Empire to Hull, Yorkshire. She was refloated on 11 February and resumed her voyage.
Maria Angelique	France	The ship was wrecked at La Tremblade, Charente-Maritime. She was on a voyage from Málaga to Bordeaux, Gironde.
Ocean	United Kingdom	The ship was driven ashore near Skinburness, Cumberland. She was refloated on 25 February and taken into Maryport.
Rose in Bloom	United States	The ship departed from Plymouth, North Carolina for Barbados. No further trace, presumed foundered with the loss of all hands.
Sarah	United Kingdom	The ship was driven ashore and severely damaged at Lowestoft, Suffolk. She was on a voyage from Portsmouth, Hampshire to Grangemouth, Stirlingshire. Sarah was refloated on 20 February and taken in to Lowestoft.
St. Niel	Russia	The barque was wrecked on the Abbey Tay Sands.
Water Witch	United Kingdom	The ship was driven ashore on Scharhörn. She was on a voyage from Sunderland, County Durham to Hamburg. Water Witch was refloated on 17 February and put in to Hamburg.
HMS Wolverine	Royal Navy	The Racer-class brig-sloop was driven ashore near Barcelona, Spain. She was later refloated and taken into Malta.
