= Skelton (1818 ship) =

History

United Kingdom
- Name: Skelton
- Owner: 1818:Dixon & Co.; 1825:Dixon & Co.
- Builder: Holt and Richardson
- Launched: 1818
- Fate: Wrecked July 1828

General characteristics
- Tons burthen: 260, or 261 (bm)
- Length: 93 ft 10 in (28.6 m)
- Beam: 28 ft 5 in (8.7 m)
- Crew: 1820:17
- Notes: Three-masted ship

Skelton was launched in 1818 at Whitby. She made one notable voyage in 1820 to Australia, notable because her captain later published a detailed account with extensive economic, commercial, and other observational information about the Cape of Good Hope, Hobart Town (Van Diemen's Land), Port Jackson, and Rio de Janeiro. She later became a West Indiaman and was wrecked in 1828.

== Career ==
Skelton first appeared in Lloyd's Register (LR) in 1819 with Dixon, master and owner, and trade "L"–Quebec. LR for 1820 showed Skelton's trade changing from London–Quebec to London–New South Wales.

The state of the British economy in 1820 not being strong, and the demand for vessels likewise being weak, a number of shipowners sought to transport emigrants to the Cape and Australia. Captain James Dixon sailed Skelton from Leith on 20 June with 57 passengers and 17 crew. She was bound for the Cape, Hobart Town, and Port Jackson. She was the first vessel to sail direct from Scotland to Australia.

Skelton arrived at Table Bay on 28 September. The colony's medical officer limited the number of people that might land as she had an outbreak of measles on board. Still, three of four passengers who had booked passage to the Cape disembarked. (Note: A website dedicated to documenting the immigrants to South Africa who arrived under the British Government's 1820 Settlers scheme lists Skelton among the vessels bringing migrants. She was not part of the scheme.)

Skelton sailed from South Africa on 14 October, and the pilot brought her into port at Hobart Town on 27 November. Dixon sailed from Hobart on 5 January 1821 and arrived in Port Jackson on 17 January.

Dixon sailed from Sydney for Hull, via Rio de Janeiro, on 10 June. Skelton was carrying 181 bales of wool, 40 tons of timber and plank, 1680 kangaroo skins, a little wattle bark, and 2800 ox horns. Skelton sailed via Cape Horn, which she reached on 3 August. She arrived at Sugarloaf Mountain and Rio on 23 August. She was the first vessel in five years to arrive at Rio from Port Jackson.

Dixon and Skelton sailed from Rio on 24 September. Three days later, at 21°49′S 39°20′W a sloop and a schooner approached in a suspicious manner. They would not identify themselves and Dixon made preparations to resist if they attempted to attack Skelton, but eventually they left.

Skelton arrived at the Isle of Wight on 24 November where she landed some passengers, and the Downs the next day, where she landed some more. She reached the Humber on 27 November, and arrived at Leith on 5 December.

Dixon’s voyage was a commercial success. Between 1820 and 1824 ten vessels sailed from Lieth to Australia. Among them were Westmoreland (1820), Castle Forbes (1821), Minerva (1822), Urania (1822), Skelton (1822), Andromeda (1822), Greenock (1823), Triton (1823), Portland (1824), and City of Edinburgh (1824).

LR for 1828 showed Skelton's master changing from Tait to Percy. Her trade was London–Trinidad.

== Fate ==
On 30 July 1828 Skelton, Percy, master, was sailing from Trinidad to London when she struck a rock 13' under water, some 10 miles west of Anguila. Although she foundered, her crew was saved. Lloyd's List reported on 23 September 1828 that they had arrived at Tortola in a boat.
