= Edward (1804 ship) =

History

United Kingdom
- Name: Edward
- Builder: Bristol
- Launched: 1804, or 1806
- Fate: Last listed 1841

General characteristics
- Type: Barque
- Tons burthen: Old Act: 335, or 385, or 38520/94 or 406, or 407, or 416 (bm); New Act (post 1836): 568 (bm)
- Length: 103 ft 6 in (31.5 m)
- Beam: 29 ft 7 in (9.0 m)
- Propulsion: Sail

Edward was built at Bristol, England, in 1806. She was a West Indiaman until from 1829, she made two voyages transporting convicts from Ireland to Australia. She was last listed in 1841, sailing between London and Madras.

== Career ==
There is some confusion concerning Edward's origins. The most specialized source gives a launch year of 1804. Lloyd's Register (LR) and the Register of Shipping gave launch years of 1804. Then in 1829, LR gave a launch year of 1806, though RS continued with the 1804 year. Two important sources drew on the later information from LR to give a launch year of 1806.

Edward entered LR in 1805 with T. Powell, master, Protheroe, owner, and trade Bristol-Jamaica. She remained a West Indiaman under a series of owners, and masters, until circa. 1829.

The information from the registers is only as accurate at the owners chose to keep it. Furthermore, the registers published at different times of the year and some discrepancies between them arise from that.

| Year | Master | Owner | Trade | Source |
|---|---|---|---|---|
| 1810 | T.Powell; T.Smith | R.Claxton | Bristol–Nevis | LR |
| 1815 | T.Smith | R.Claxton | Bristol–Nevis | LR |
| 1820 | Wytock; Pell | Captain & Co. | London–St Vincent | LR; thorough repair 1812 |
| 1820 | F.Pell; Douglas | Brookes | London–St Vincent | RS; good repair 1810 |
| 1825 | W.Drew | Brock & Co. | London–St Vincent | LR; thorough repair 1814 |
| 1825 | Drewe; Marshall | Captain & Co. | London–St Vincent; London transport | RS; damages repaired 1821 |
| 1829 | Gilbert | Somes | London–New South Wales | LR; thorough repair 1828 |

Under the command of J. Gilbert and with surgeon William Watt, Edward left Cork, Ireland on 1 January 1829, and arrived in Sydney on 26 April 1829. She embarked 177 female convicts; three died en route. Edward departed Port Jackson on 27 May 1829 bound for Bombay in ballast.

On her second convict voyage under the command of J. Gilbert and surgeon Thomas Bell, Edward left Cork, Ireland on 17 October 1830, and arrived in Sydney on 22 February 1831. She had embarked 158 male convicts and had five deaths en route. Edward departed Port Jackson on 26 March 1831, bound for Batavia, in company with York bound for Madras.

Edward returned to Sydney on 3 April after Captain Gilbert believed that York had been seized by the soldiers sailing aboard her. York too returned to Port Jackson due to adverse winds. The fear of a mutiny turned out to be a misunderstanding.

Edward left Port Jackson on 5 April bound for Batavia and arrived at Batavia on 16 May 1831. She then returned to London.

The British East India Company gave up its shipping side in 1835. Thereafter all British ships were free to trade with India and China.

| Year | Master | Owner | Trade | Source and notes |
|---|---|---|---|---|
| 1835 | J. Martin | | London | Lloyd's Register |
| 1840 | S.Morton | Waddell & Co. | London–Madras | Lloyd's Register; large repair 1837 |
| 1841 | S.Morton | Waddell & Co. | London–Madras | Lloyd's Register; large repair 1837 |
