= Layton (1814 ship) =

UK merchant, convict, and migrant ship (1814–1847

History

United Kingdom
- Name: Layton
- Owner: 1st EIC voyage: Brocklebank & Nephew; 2nd EIC voyage: John Dawson; 3rd EIC voyage: Joseph Somes
- Builder: Brocklebank, Lancaster
- Launched: 29 October 1814
- Fate: Lost at sea 1847

General characteristics
- Tons burthen: 49063/94, 498, 499, 513, or 518 (bm)
- Length: 118 ft 2 in (36.0 m)
- Beam: 31 ft 2 in (9.5 m)

Layton was launched in 1814 at Lancaster, possibly as a West Indiaman. She twice sailed to India under a licence from the British East India Company (EIC), once as a troopship. The EIC later chartered Layton three times for single voyages to India and Java. She made four voyages transporting convicts to Australia (three voyages to Van Diemen's Land, and one to New South Wales). She also made two voyages carrying emigrants from the United Kingdom to New South Wales. She was lost in 1847.

== Career ==
By one account, Layton sailed as a West Indiaman between her launch in 1814 and 1822. Lloyd's List's ship arrival and departure data shows her sailing between London and Jamaica, first under Atkinson (or Arkinson), master, and then under Hawthornthwaite (or Harthornthwaite).

In 1813 the EIC had lost its monopoly on the trade between India and Britain. British ships were then free to sail to India or the Indian Ocean under a licence from the EIC. By 1817 Layton was sailing to India under an EIC licence.

She first appeared in Lloyd's Register (LR), in 1818.

Year	Master	Owner	Trade	Source & notes
1818	Taylor	Wildman	London–Île de France	LR

On 8 April 1817 Captain T.Taylor sailed for Bombay under a license from the EIC. On 9 November Layton had arrived in Bengal. On 13 March 1818 Layton had to put back into dock at Calcutta to repair damage that she had sustained when she had grounded while going down the river. She sailed for London on 5 April. She arrived at St Helena on 23 July and left on 27 July. She arrived at Gravesend on 19 September.

On 21 December, Layton, Morgan, master, sailed for Madras, or Ceylon and Bengal. She stopped in Cork, where she picked up part of the 45th Regiment of Foot to carry them to Ceylon. She arrived at Porto Praya on 23 February 1819. On 22 July she was at Bengal, having come via Ceylon and Madras. She sailed from the Sandheads on 2 November, and from the Cape on 14 January 1820. She arrived at Deal on 30 March. On 14 March Layton, Morgan, master, she endured a heavy gale that sprung her mainmast and cost her her boats and bulwarks as she came to England from Bengal. She arrived at Gravesend on 2 April.

On 17 December 1820 Layton, Leveque, master, arrived back at Gravesend from Jamaica.

Year	Master	Owner	Trade	Source & notes
1822	Leveque; D.Miller	Wildman; Brocklebank	London–Jamaica; London–India	LR

1st EIC voyage (1822–1823): On 13 March 1822 the EIC chartered Layton, of 499 tons, for one voyage to Bencoolen at a rate of £8 13s per ton. Captain David Miller sailed from Portsmouth on 29 April. Layton arrived at Bencoolen on 13 August. Homeward bound, she was at the Cape on 3 October. She arrived back in the Downs on 5 January 1823.

2nd EIC voyage (1824–1825): On 6 April 1824 the EIC chartered Layton, of 498 tons, for one voyage to Bencoolen at a rate of £11 8s per ton. Captain Miller sailed from the Downs on 23 June, bound for Bengal and Bencoolen. Layton arrived at Calcutta on 10 November. She was at Diamond Harbour on 8 January 1825, and arrived at Benkulen on 24 February. Homeward bound, she reached St Helena on 25 May, and arrived at the Downs on 16 July.

Year	Master	Owner	Trade	Source & notes
1827	D.Miller; Campbell; Lanscombe	Brookbank; Somes	London–Bengal; London–Botany Bay	LR; small repairs 1824

1st convict voyage to Van Diemen's Land (1827): Captain John H. Lunscombe sailed from Plymouth on 4 June 1827. She arrived at Hobart Town on 9 October, having come via Santiago, Cape Verde. She had embarked 160 male convicts and arrived with 159, having suffered one convict death on her way.

Year	Master	Owner	Trade	Source & notes
1829	Luscomb; Hurst	Somes	London transport	LR; small repairs 1824

1st convict voyage to New South Wales (1829): Captain John W. Hurst sailed from London on 19 June 1829 and arrived at Port Jackson on 8 November 1829. Layton had embarked 190 male convicts and had suffered two convict deaths on route.

Year	Master	Owner	Trade	Source & notes
1830	Hurst	Somes	London–New South Wales	LR; small repairs 1824
1832	Hurst; R.Sanders	J.Somes	Cork–Halifax	LR; small repairs 1824
1833	R.Sanders	J.Somes	London–India	LR; small repairs 1824

3rd EIC voyage (1832–1833): On 18 April 1832 the EIC chartered Layton, of 513 tons, for one voyage to and from Bengal at a rate of £9 6s per ton. Captain William Campbell sailed from the Downs on 25 June. She reached Madras on 11 October. She arrived at Calcutta on 3 November. Homeward bound, she was at Culpee on 13 January 1833. She reached St Helena on 1 April, and arrived back at the Downs on 29 May.

Year	Master	Owner	Trade	Source & notes
1834	G.Wade		London	LR

Captain Giles Wade sailed from London on 19 August 1833 with 11 male emigrants and 284 female migrants to New south Wales, sailing under the auspices of the London Emigration Committee. Layton arrived at Port Jackson on 19 December. (Note: This was the second such voyage; Bussorah Merchant was the first.) Other reports state that Layton carried 28 male and 276 female free settlers, for a total of 304 settlers. She left for China around the end of January 1834.

2nd convict voyage to Van Diemen's Land (1835): Captain Wade sailed from Sheerness on 29 August 1835. Layton arrived at Hobart Town on 10 December 1835. She had embarked 270 male convicts, two of whom died on the voyage. On 12 February 1836 Layton sailed to Manila in ballast. She arrived at Singapore on 7 May. She sailed from Canton for Java on 23 June.

Layton made a second voyage carrying emigrants to Australia. Captain John Austin sailed on 8 September 1837 from Bristol and arrived in Sydney on 20 January 1838. She had embarked 138 emigrants and 162 children. Two adults and 70 children, all under the age of four, died on the voyage. Another account had her arriving with 122 adult immigrants and 110 children, with 70 children having died of measles after leaving Bristol. As no new cases had occurred within the six weeks before she arrived she was not put into quarantine. Yet another tally gave the number of adults as 61 men and 64 women, for a total of 125. Layton sailed on 26 February for Batavia, sailing in ballast.

Year	Master	Owner	Trade	Source & notes
1839	G.Wade; Austin	J.Somes	London	LR; new wales and topsides 1833, and small repairs 1837 & 1839
1842	Austin	J.Somes; Coleman	London transport	LR; new wales and topsides 1833, and small repairs 1837, 1839, & 1842

3rd convict voyage to Van Diemen's Land (1841): Captain Daniel W. Stephens sailed from London on 9 April 1841, and arrived at Hobart on 1 September. Layton had embarked 250 male convicts for Australia, five of whom died on the voyage. Two officers and 40 other ranks of the 96th Regiment of Foot provided the guard. They bought some dependents with them.

Year	Master	Owner	Trade	Source & notes
1844	Coleman; J.New	J.Somes; C.G.Ive	London transport London–Icheboe	LR; new wales and topsides 1833, & small repairs 1842 & 1845
1845	J.New	C.G.Ive	London–Icheboe	LR; new wales and topsides 1833, & small repairs 1842 & 1845
1846	J.New	C.G.Ive	London–Icheboe	LR; new wales and topsides 1833, & small repairs 1842 & 1845

From around 1845 Layton carried guano from Ichaboe Island, off what is now Namibia. On 9 December 1845 Layton arrived at Barbados from Icheboe and St Helena, leaky. Earlier, on 7 September, she had been reported to have arrived leaky at St Helena while on her way from Icheboe to London. She had been surveyed, ordered lightened, and had discharged cargo.

== Fate ==
Layton was reportedly lost at sea in 1847.
