= Boddingtons (1793 ship) =

Historical merchant ship

History

Great Britain
- Name: Boddingtons
- Owner: Boddingtons (1793-1815)
- Builder: William Mellish, Limehouse, River Thames
- Launched: 19 November 1793
- Fate: Abandoned at sea November 1840

General characteristics
- Tons burthen: 298, or 301, or 305 (bm)
- Armament: 1795:6 × 4-pounder guns; 1805:6 × 4-pounder guns; 1815:2 × 18-pounder + 2 × 12-pounder carronades

Boddingtons, or Boddington, was a merchantman that was launched in 1793, on the Thames River for Boddingtons. She spent most of her career as a West Indiaman. She did make one voyage to Australia carrying passengers. Her crew abandoned her at sea in November 1840.

== Career ==
Boddingtons enters Lloyd's Register in 1794 with P. Scallon, master, Boddingtons, owner, and trade London—Nevis.

Year	Master	Owner	Trade
1795	J. Clarke	Boddingtons	London—Nevis
1800	P. Seale	Boddingtons	London—Nevis

Boddington, Soal, master, bound for St Vincent, put into Plymouth on 1 February 1804. She was part of a fleet of 43 sail under the escort of the 74-gun HMS Courageaux that had left Portsmouth on 2 January, bound for the West Indies. For some reason, the whole fleet put back into Plymouth. Still, Boddington reportedly put into Cork, Ireland, on 3 February. The West Indies fleet left Cork the next day under the escort of the frigates HMS Galatea and HMS Topaze.

Year	Master	Owner	Trade
1805	P. Soal	Boddingtons	London—St Vincent
1807	S.Soal; Clark	Boddingtons	London—St Vincent

On 17 February 1807, Boddingtons was driven ashore between Deal and South Foreland, Kent.

Year	Master	Owner	Trade	Source & notes
1808	Clark	Boddingtons	London—St Kitts	LR
1810	Soal	Boddingtons	London—St Vincent	LR
1812	J.Stranchan; J.Stranach (or Stranich)	Boddingtons	London—St Vincent	LR
1816	J.Stranich; J.Parent	Boddingtons; Neal	London—St Vincent	LR; small repairs 1813
1819	J.Parent; J.Findlay	Neil & Co.	London–Bermuda	LR; good repairs 1817 & small repairs 1818
1821	J.Findlay; Brooks	Neil & Co.	London–Bermuda	LR; good repairs 1817, small repairs 1818, & repairs 1821

On the morning of 16 December 1821, Boddingtons was in ballast when she caught fire at St. Catherine's Stairs, Wapping. Her crew scuttled her and afterwards her main and mizzen masts were cut away. Lloyd's Register for 1823, carries the notation that Boddingtons was rebuilt in 1822.

Year	Master	Owner	Trade	Source & notes
1823	Sayre; Ford	M'Ghie & Co.	London—Antigua	LR; rebuilt 1823
1825	Timm; Brown	M'Ghe & Co. Marshall	London—St Lucia	

Her owner, John Marshall, of 26 Birchin Lane, Cornhill, was the most active colonial emigration agent before the formation in 1840, of the Colonial Land and Emigration Commission. He arranged for passengers and emigrants to travel on vessels he owned, such as Boddingtons or Doncaster, or had chartered, such as Bussorah Merchant.

Under the command of J. Taylor, Boddingtons sailed from London on 1 October 1827, stopping at the Cape of Good Hope and arrived at Hobart Town on 14 March 1828, with cargo and passengers. She left Hobart Town and arrived at Sydney on 22 April, carrying cargo, passengers and a number of convicts. (Note: Bateson does not list Boddingtons among the vessels delivering convicts to either Hobart or Sydney in 1827-29. She may simply have transferred some convicts.) She left Port Jackson on 2 September, bound for London.

Year	Master	Owner	Trade
1830	Taylor; Noyes	Marshall	London—Demerara
1835	S. Ellis		Belonging to Liverpool
1840	P. Vinnes	J. Terry	Liverpool-Quebec

== Fate ==
Lloyd's Register for 1840, shows Boddingtons, now with homeport of Whitby, as having been "Abandoned". The Naval Journal reported that the barque Boddingtons, of Whitby, was abandoned at sea on 14 November 1840. Her crew of 14 was taken off.
