= Doncaster (1825 ship) =

UK merchant ship (1825–1836)

History

United Kingdom
- Name: Doncaster
- Namesake: Doncaster
- Builder: Wigram's & Green, Blackwall
- Launched: 9 February 1825
- Fate: Wrecked 17 July 1836

General characteristics
- Tons burthen: 234 (bm)
- Length: 94 ft 7 in (28.8 m)
- Beam: 23 ft 8 in (7.2 m)
- Sail plan: Barque

Doncaster was launched on the River Thames in 1825. Early in her career she carried emigrants to Australia. She made other voyages to Van Diemen's Land and New South Wales, but also traded as a West Indiaman. She was wrecked on 17 July 1836, on the coast of South Africa while sailing from Île de France (Mauritius) to London.

== Career ==
Doncaster was built at Blackwall Yard by Wigram and Green. She first appeared in the volume of the Register of Shipping (RS), in 1825.

Year	Master	Owner	Trade	Source
1825	Brown	Marshall	London–Demerara; London–New South Wales	RS

Doncaster, Brown, master, sailed to Cork, and then on to Demerara, where she arrived on 19 April 1825. She arrived back at Gravesend on 15 August. She first appeared in Lloyd's Register (LR), in 1826.

Year	Master	Owner	Trade	Source
1826	Church	J. Marshall	London–Van Diemen's Land	LR

Doncaster, S.Brown, master was listed in Lloyd's Register as sailing for Van Diemen's Land (VDL) or New South Wales (NSW) on 5 December 1825. Lloyd's List's ship arrival and departure (SAD) data showed Doncaster, Church, master, at Deal on 20 November, bound for New South Wales. Doncaster, Church, master, on her way to Van Diemen's Land, arrived at Cowes on 30 November with a broken rudder. She sailed for VDL on 5 December, or NSW on 6 December. On 28 December she sailed for VDL from Plymouth. (Note: Her owner, John Marshall, of 26 Birchin Lane, Cornhill, was the most active colonial emigration agent before the formation in 1840 of the Colonial Land and Emigration Commission. He arranged for passengers and emigrants to travel on vessels he owned, such as Doncaster or Boddingtons, or had chartered, such as Bussorah Merchant.)

Doncaster, John Foster Church, master, arrived at Hobart on 5 May 1826, with merchandise and 20 passengers. On 23 May, Doncaster, Church, master, sailed from Hobart; she arrived at Port Jackson/Sydney on 29 May. One of her passengers was a distressed British subject that the British Consul at Santiago, Cape Verde had put on board when Doncaster had stopped there in January.

On 12 July, Doncaster, Church, master, sailed for London, stopping at Hobart to take on cargo. She left Hobart on 10 October, Mrs. Church having given birth to a son while at Hobart. Doncaster arrived back at Gravesend. Captain Church then took command of Jessie Lawson, another vessel owned by John Marshall.

Year	Master	Owner	Trade	Source
1827	Church; Muller	J. Marshall	London–Van Diemen's Land	LR
1828	Muller; Ireland	J. Marshall	London–Jamaica	LR; small repairs 1826
1829	Ireland	J. Marshall	London–New South Wales	LR; small repairs 1826
1830	Ireland; Surflen	J. Marshall	London–New South Wales	LR; repairs 1830
1831	E.Surflen	J. Marshall	London–Île de France	LR

In 1813 the EIC had lost its monopoly on the trade between India and Britain. British ships were then free to sail to India or the Indian Ocean under a licence from the EIC. Doncaster, Surflen, master, sailed from London on 3 February 1831, bound for Île de France and Ceylon.

Year	Master	Owner	Trade	Source
1834	E.Surflen; G.Pritchard	Blythe & Co.	London–Mauritius	LR

== Fate ==
Doncaster, Pritchard, master, was wrecked on 17 July 1836, at the mouth of the Kleine River, South Africa. Another report stated that bodies and part of the wreckage had drifted ashore at Cape Agulhas. All 64 people on board were lost. She was on a voyage from Mauritius to London.

A later report had a casualty list. Passengers included civilians and troops being invalided home.
