= Admiral Cockburn (1814 ship) =

British merchant ship 1814–1839

History

United States
- Name: Unknown (Note: The BSWF database gives Admiral Cockburn's origin as Halifax in 1814, suggesting that their records show that she was condemned as a prize in the Vice admiralty court there. However, a perusal of a list of vessels adjudicated there reveals no obvious candidate.)
- Builder: New York, or Philadelphia
- Launched: 1808, or 1809
- Captured: 1814

United Kingdom
- Name: Admiral Cockburn
- Namesake: Sir George Cockburn, 10th Baronet
- Owner: 1815:Corney & Co.; 1829:Blyth & Co. (Note: Thomas Blyth, Limehouse, and Francis Whitney, Barge Yar.); 1832:Somes (Note: Joseph Somes, Ratcliff, and T. N. Oldfield, Cumberland.)
- Builder: Liverpool
- Acquired: 1814 by purchase of a prize
- Fate: Wrecked 1839

General characteristics
- Tons burthen: 338, or 350, or 351 (bm)
- Length: 105 ft 8 in (32.2 m)
- Beam: 27 ft 5 in (8.4 m)
- Propulsion: Sail
- Armament: 8 × 18-pounder carronades
- Notes: Built of live oak, cedar, and pitch pine

Admiral Cockburn was a ship launched in New York in 1808 or Philadelphia in 1809, almost certainly under a different name. The British captured the American ship in 1814 and she was sold as a prize. Corney & Co. purchased and renamed her; originally she served as a London-based transport. In 1829 she became a whaler in the southern whale fishery . She was wrecked at Muizenberg Beach, False Bay, Cape of Good Hope, South Africa in July 1839 while returning to London from her third whaling voyage.

== Career ==
Admiral Cockburn first appeared in Lloyd's Register (LR) in 1815.

Year	Master	Owner	Trade	Source
1815	M.Corney	Corney	London transport	LR

On 28 January 1819, Admiral Cockburn, J. Briggs, master, sailed for Bombay under a license from the British East India Company. This was not her first voyage to India and Australasia. From 1818 on she had travelled there, first under Corney, and then under Briggs. In June 1819, Briggs and Admiral Cockburn stopped at Île Saint-Paul. She arrived at Sydney on 6 September, and then sailed to Tasmania on 10 days later. She returned to Sydney, before leaving again on 21 November, again for Tasmania. This time she was carrying 130 convicts, ten old hands, and 120 convicts that had arrived on Bencoolen. On 1 February 1820 she sailed from Sydney for London. She was carrying a cargo of locally-produced wool.

On 29 November 1824 Admiral Cockburn stopped at Tristan da Cunha. There she picked up the artist Augustus Earle, who had been inadvertently marooned there earlier in the year on 29 March. He left Admiral Cockburn on 18 January 1825 when she stopped at Hobart Town, Van Dieman's Land. On 16 February 1829 Captain Peter Kemp sailed Admiral Cockburn to Timor and New Zealand on a whaling voyage. She was reported to have been at Timor in July with 200 barrels of sperm oil. Then she and the whaler Ranger were reported to have been off Japan in May 1830. In October Admiral Cockburn was at Guam with 1200 barrels. In August 1831 she was at the Bay of Islands with 1700 barrels. Lastly, on 12 January 1832 she was at the Bay of Islands with 2200 barrels. She returned to England on 3 June 1832 with 2200 barrels of sperm oil.

In 1832 ownership of Admiral Cockburn changed, as did command. On 11 October Captain William Hingston (or Kingston), sailed from England on Admiral Cockburn's second whaling voyage. On 4 March 1833 she was at the Bay of Islands with 210 barrels. On 29 October she was at Honolulu with 1900 barrels. In December she was at Tahiti. She returned to England on 23 May 1835 with 202 tuns of oil.

For her third (and last) whaling voyage Admiral Cockburn had a new master, Captain James Lawrence. He sailed her from England on 14 September 1835. On 29 October 1836 she was at Oahu, having come from the seas around Japan, with 310 barrels. She sailed from Oahu on 1 December. On 9 August 1837 Admiral Cockburn was at Port Lloyd in the Bonin Islands. There one of her crew deserted. He left about 10 days later on the whaler Mellish. Three months later, on 7 November 1837, Admiral Cockburn was in the bay at Hilo, Hawaii, when a tsunami hit at 7pm. As the waves subsided, Lawrence launched his boats. Apparently they were able to rescue a dozen people that the waves had pulled out to sea. About an equal number of Hilo's inhabitants lost their lives. From 21 November to 1 December she was at Honolulu with 800 barrels. Reportedly Admiral Cockburn put into Oahu after her crew refused to do any more duty. Clearly the crew returned to work because she was reported to have been at Honolulu between 1 and 29 October 1838 with 1100 barrels. (Another report had her with 1500 barrels already by 30 June.) Coronet encountered Admiral Cockburn on 24 April at Geby (Pulau Gebe in the Central Halmahera Regency; 0.092236°S 129.492635°E), at which time she had 1600 barrels. On 5 July Admiral Cockburn was at Timor.

== Fate ==
On 19 October 1839 The Times reported that Admiral Cockburn had gone onshore at Muizenberg Beach on 26 July 1839 while returning to London from a whaling voyage in the South Seas. Her crew, except for one man, was saved, as were 1100 barrels of oil. (Note: The whaling voyages' database gives a date of 26 September for the loss, and the report appearing at the Cape of Good Hope gives a date of 18 October. This is inconsistent with the news appearing in London on 19 October.)

== See also ==
- Shipwrecks of Cape Town
