= George Hibbert (1803 ship) =

History

United Kingdom
- Name: George Hibbert
- Namesake: George Hibbert
- Builder: William Leslie, Newcastle-upon-Tyne
- Launched: 23 April 1803
- Fate: Condemned 1835

General characteristics
- Tons burthen: 328, or 32879/94 (bm)
- Armament: 6 × 12-pounder cannons "of the New Construction"

George Hibbert was launched in 1803 at Newcastle-upon-Tyne. In 1815 and 1822 she rescued the crews of sinking vessels. In 1834 she made one voyage transporting female convicts to New South Wales. She was condemned as unseaworthy at Coringa on her way back to England via India.

== Career ==
George Hibbert first appeared in Lloyd's Register (LR) in the volume for 1803.

Year	Master	Owner	Trade	Source
1803	J.Thompson	Captain & Co.	London–Jamaica	LR
1806	Trew; T.Head	Blackman	London–Antigua	

On 28 November 1810, George Hibbert, Head, master, was on her way from London to Antigua when she ran on shore near the North Forelands. A boat's crew from Broad Stairs got her off with only the loss of an anchor and cable.

The Swedish ship Charlotta was wrecked on the Long Sand, in the North Sea. George Hibbert rescued her crew and landed them at Deal. Charlotta was on a voyage from Gothenburg to Lisbon.

On 19 August 1822 George Hibbert fell in with Anna Dorothea, of Kiel, Harder, master. Anna Dorothea was on her way from St Ubes to New York when she started to sink. George Hibbert took off the crew and brought them into the Downs.

Year	Master	Owner	Trade	Source & notes
1834	G.Livesay	Head & Co.	London–New South Wales	LR; new top sides 1823, new wales 1825, & new deck 1829

Convict transport: Captain George N. Livesay sailed from the Downs on 27 July 1834. George Hibbert arrived at Port Jackson, New South Wales, on 1 December 1834. She had embarked 144 female convicts and had suffered no convict deaths on her voyage. Vessels with all-female prisoners did not have a guard, though due to the efforts of Elizabeth Fry, George Hibbert was the first convict transport with women to have a matron. The matron was a Mrs. Saunders, the wife of a missionary named John Saunders. The government paid for their passages on condition that John Saunders served a chaplain to all on board.

== Fate ==
George Hibbert sailed from Port Jackson on 13 May 1835, bound for India. She reached Madras, where the second officer died. At Madras Captain Livesay was able to secure both a cargo and passengers for England. She sailed on 25 June. Three crew members were on the sick list, but the surgeon assured Livesay that they would recover on the voyage. On 28 June she encountered a gale and became leaky. The gale continued for several days and the three sick sailors, rather than recovering, died. This left George Hibbert with only four men and two boys to man the pumps and work the ship, consequently the still able crew members became exhausted. Livesay decided to make for port. When she arrived at Coringa the passengers complained that she was unseaworthy. George Hibbert underwent several expensive repairs and surveys, but to no avail.

On 18 August 1835, George Hibbert was condemned as unseaworthy. She was then sold for breaking up.

Captain Livesay transhipped George Hibbert's cargo into the Duchess of Northumberland. He then returned to London as a passenger in her.
