= Malabar (1804 ship) =

History

United Kingdom
- Name: Malabar
- Owner: 1804:Brown & Co.; 1816:Johnson & Co.
- Builder: Temple shipbuilders, South Shields, or Jarrow
- Launched: 24 May 1804

General characteristics
- Tons burthen: 520, or 525, or 528, or 52861/94 (bm)
- Propulsion: Sail
- Sail plan: Brig
- Armament: 10 × 18-pounder carronades

Malabar was launched at Shields in 1804. She sailed primarily as a London-based transport. After the British East India Company (EIC) in 1814 lost its monopoly on the trade with India, Malabar made several voyages to India under a licence from the EIC. Then in 1819 she made a voyage transporting convicts to Port Jackson, Australia, followed by one in 1821 where she transported convicts to Van Diemen's Land. She is last listed in 1824.

== Career ==
Malabar appeared in the supplemental pages of the 1804 volume of Lloyd's Register with C. Wilson, master, and T. Brown, owner.

Year	Master	Owner	Trade	Source
1805	C. Wilson	T&R Brown	London transport	Register of Shipping
1810	C. Wilson	Brown & Co.	London transport	Lloyd's Register
1815	Ascough	T&R. Brown	London transport	Register of shipping

Lloyd's List reported on 28 December 1813 that on 25 November the "Malabar transport", Ashew, master, had been sailing from Quebec to England when she had had to put into Halifax, Nova Scotia, having lost her rudder and otherwise being much damaged.

On 14 April 1816 Malabar sailed from Bengal but almost immediately grounded and had to put back the same day.

On 7 April 1817, Malabar, Ascough, master, sailed for Bombay. On 1 October Malabar sailed from the Cape of Good Hope for England.

Malabar returned to Gravesend on 24 March 1819. She had left Bengal on 27 October 1818, and Saint Helena on 19 January 1819.

Convict voyage to Port Jackson (1819): Captain William Ascough sailed from Spithead on 17 June 1819 and arrived at Port Jackson on 29 October. Malabar embarked 173 male convicts and landed 170. The three missing men are not recorded as having died on the voyage. They may have been re-landed, or they may have escaped en route. On 10 December she sailed from New South Wales, bound for Batavia and Bengal.

On 24 December 1820 Malabar arrived back at Gravesend, having left Batavia on 20 August.

Convict voyage to Van Diemen's Land (1821): Captain Ascough sailed from Gravesend on 22 June 1821. Malabar arrived at Hobart Town on 21 October. She had embarked 171 male convicts and she disembarked 171. The 46th Regiment of Foot provided the guard. Malabar, Ascough, master, arrived at Deal on 11 October 1822, from Batavia.

== Fate ==
Malabar is last listed in Lloyd's Register and the Register of Shipping in 1824 with Ascough as master and with trade London–Van Diemen's Land. Captain Ascough sailed Competitor on 18 March 1823 with convicts for Van Diemen's Land.
