= Mellish (1819 ship) =

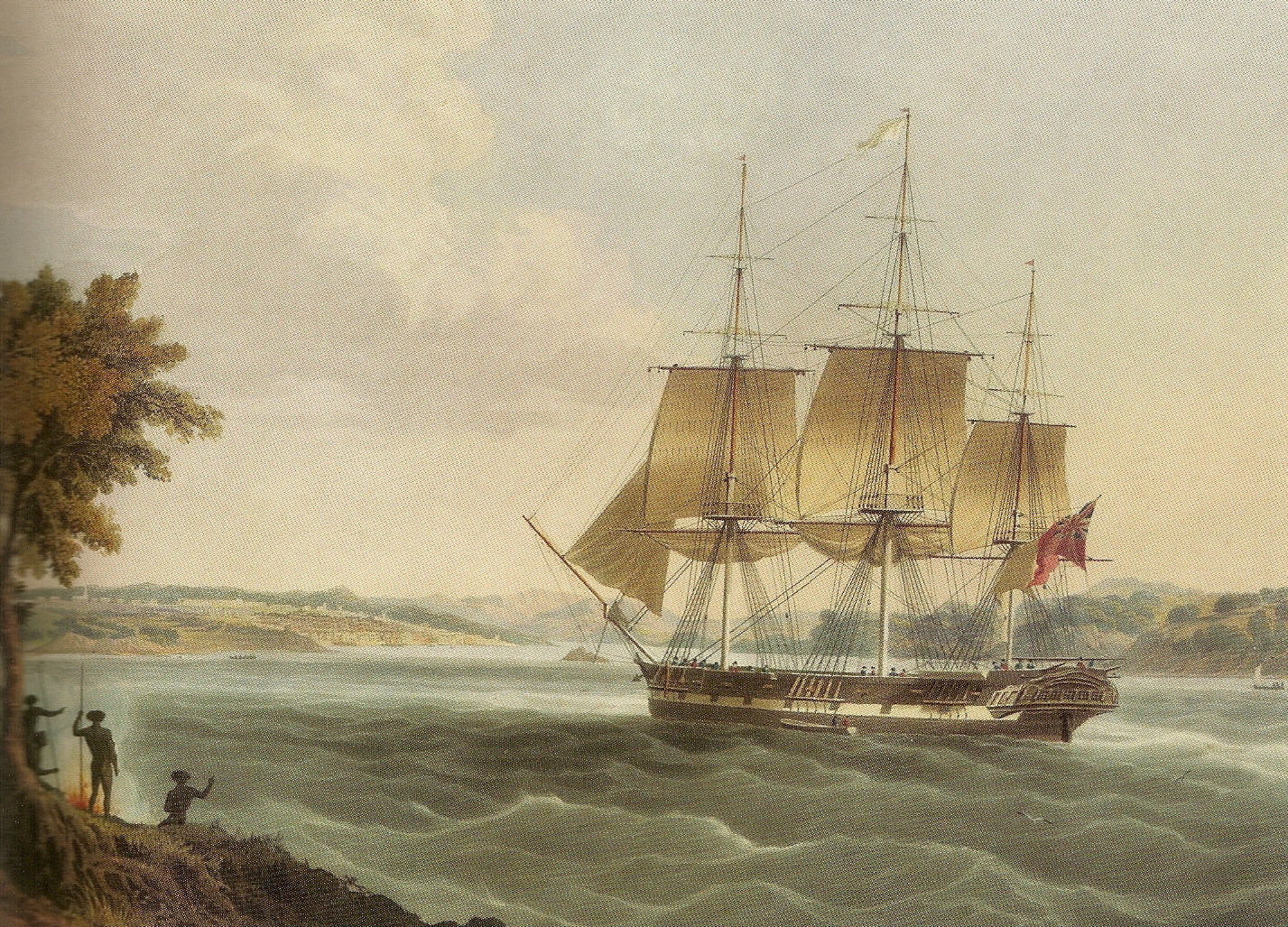
- Mellish in Sydney Harbour, c. 1830, by William John Huggins

History

United Kingdom
- Name: Chichley Plowden
- Builder: Kyd, Co., Kidderpore
- Launched: April 1819, or 5 October 1819
- Renamed: Mellish (1819)
- Fate: Wrecked on 5 October 1844

General characteristics
- Tons burthen: 423, or 42438/94 (bm)
- Length: 112 ft 3 in (34.2 m)
- Beam: 29 ft 9 in (9.1 m)

Mellish was launched in 1819 at Kidderpore, Calcutta as Chicheley Plowden but renamed within the year and sold for a "free trader", i.e., a ship trading between England and India sailing under a license from the British East India Company (EIC). She then made two voyages transporting convicts, the first to New South Wales, and the second to Van Diemen's Land (VDL). She next made two voyages as a South Seas whaler between 1831 and 1838. She was wrecked on 5 October 1844.

== Career ==
In 1813 the EIC had lost its monopoly on the trade between India and Britain. British ships were then free to sail to India or the Indian Ocean under a license from the EIC. Mellish sailed to England and first appeared in Lloyd's Register (LR) in 1821. She then spent several years trading with India.

Year	Master	Owner	Trade	Source
1821	A.Christie	Marjoribanks	London–India	LR
1825	Cole	Marjoribanks	London–India	LR
1829	Vincent	Marjoribanks	London–New South Wales	LR

=== Convict transport ===
1st convict voyage (1829): Captain Arthur Vincent sailed from London on 1 January 1829 and arrived at Sydney on 18 April 1829. She had embarked 170 male convicts and landed 168. One convict was returned to hospital before she sailed; one escaped but drowned. The 63rd Regiment of Foot provided an officer and 30 men for the guard. The troops brought some wives and children with them. In May Mellish sailed for Singapore.

2nd convict voyage (1830): Captain Colin G. Cowley sailed from Spithead on 6 June 1830 and arrived at Hobart on 22 September. She had embarked 118 female convicts and landed 115, three having died on the voyage. She also brought 14 wives of convicts previously transported to VDL, and their 45 children.

=== South Seas whaler ===
1st whaling voyage (1831–1835): Captain G.Cowley sailed from London in 1831. Mellish returned to London on 17 January 1835 with 230 casks of whale oil.

2nd whaling voyage (1835–1838): Captain G.Cowley sailed from West India Dock, London on 26 May 1835, bound for Timor. In August 1837 Mellish was at the Bonin Islands. There she took on board a seaman who had deserted from Admiral Cockburn. Mellish returned to London on 18 September 1838 with 270 casks or 1800 barrels of whale oil.

Year	Master	Owner	Trade	Source
1839	J.Jones	G.Bishop	London–Sydney	LR

Mellish ran aground on 28 June 1840 at Port Phillip. She was on a voyage from an English port to Port Phillip.

On 1 April 1842 the ship Santa Barbara foundered in the Atlantic Ocean off Cape Finisterre.Mellish rescued the crew. Santa Barbara was on a voyage from Santa Cruz de Tenerife, Canary Islands to London.

Year	Master	Owner	Trade	Source
1845	Fawcett	Gladstanes	London-Madras	LR

== Fate ==
Mellish, Fawcett, master, was wrecked in the Paracel Islands on 5 October 1844 with some loss of life. She was three days into a voyage from China to London when a storm drove her on a reef. There were ultimately eleven survivors; some crew men had drowned and three men died of starvation after the survivors took to her boat. Her cargo was worth £100,000.
