= Lord William Bentinck (1828 Yarmouth ship) =

1828 Yarmouth ship

History

United Kingdom
- Name: Lord William Bentinck
- Namesake: Lord William Bentinck
- Builder: Yarmouth
- Launched: 1828
- Fate: Wrecked c.1859

General characteristics
- Tons burthen: 443 (bm)
- Propulsion: Sail
- Notes: Copper sheathing; later yellow metal sheathing

Lord William Bentink was launched in 1828 at Yarmouth. She made one voyage transporting convicts to Tasmania, and three carrying settlers to New Zealand for the New Zealand Company. She was wrecked between 1858 and 1859.

== Career ==
Two ships named Lord William Bentinck were launched in 1828. Lord William Bentinck launched at Yarmouth had R. Miller, master, and F.Preston, owner. Her first voyage was from Yarmouth to London.

In 1830 her master was R. Holman, changing to Allison, and her owner was Fltecher & Co. Her trade was London — Straits.

She made one voyage in 1832, carrying convicts to Tasmania. Captain William Doutty sailed from Portsmouth on 7 May 1832, and arrived at Hobart Town on 28 August. She had embarked 186 male convicts, one of whom died on the voyage.

She made three voyages to New Zealand. The first was to Wellington under Captain James Crow, arriving on 24 May 1841.

Lord William Bentinck also brought settlers to Australia in 1844.

In 1845 Lord William Bentinck's master was Sainthill, and her owner was still J. Fletcher. Her trade was London — Jamaica, changing to London — Madeira.

However, on 28 February 1846, she left Madras with 221 coolies (labourers) for Trinidad.

In 1850 Lloyd's Register named her master as J. Allan, and her owner as J. Fletcher. She had damages repaired that year, and her trade was London — New Zealand. Her second voyage to New Zealand was to Auckland under Captain Allen. She arrived on 26 August 1850. On this voyage, in addition to civilian passengers, she also she brought 48 Sappers and Miners and four gunners of the Royal Artillery.

Her third voyage to New Zealand was again to Auckland, this time under Captain Edward Canney. She reached Auckland on 12 December 1851. From Auckland she sailed to New Plymouth, arriving there on 6 January 1852. She then sailed to Australia and back to London.

While sailing to Hobart via Manila in 1853, she encountered a storm that carried away her fore-yard, and her top-sail was blown out of the bolt-ropes. After repairs she sailed to London.

== Fate ==
Lord William Bentinck was last listed in Lloyd's Register in 1855 with J. Allan, master, and Essery, owner. Her homeport now was Swansea, and her trade London–Valparaiso. One source reports that she foundered on a voyage from London to Valparaiso and gives a year of 1859. Another source reports that Sir William Bentinck foundered on 29 September 1857, in the Atlantic Ocean. Her crew were rescued by the brig Lucilla.
