= Majestic (1829 ship) =

History

United Kingdom
- Name: Majestic
- Owner: 1829:J. Catto & Co.; c.1840:Bell & Marshall, South Shields
- Builder: Nicol, Reid & Co., Aberdeen
- Launched: 1829
- Fate: Last listed, with stale data, in 1843

General characteristics
- Tons burthen: 344, or 345 (bm)
- Length: 100 ft 7 in (30.7 m)
- Beam: 28 ft 4 in (8.6 m)
- Depth: 19 ft 6 in (5.9 m)

Majestic was launched at Aberdeen in 1829. She made several voyages from England to India, and one voyage transporting female convicts to Van Diemen's Land.

== Career ==
Majestic entered the Register of Shipping (RS) in 1830 with Lawson, master, Catto, owner, and trade Aberdeen–Dundee. She only entered Lloyd's Register (LR) in 1832.

Majestic made at least two voyages to India while sailing under a license from the British East India Company (EIC). In 1813 the EIC had lost its monopoly on the trade between India and Britain. British ships were then free to sail to India or the Indian Ocean under a license from the EIC. In 1833–4 the EIC gave up its shipping business, after which any British ship could trade with India and China without a license from the EIC.

Majestic, Lawson, master, sailed to Bombay twice under a license. The first time she left on 3 May 1831. The second time she left on 5 April 1832. Majestic continued to sail to Bombay after the total expiration of the EIC's monopoly.

Convict voyage: Captain G. Williamson sailed Majestic from London on 1 October 1838; she arrived 22 January 1839 at Van Diemen's Land. She embarked 126 female convicts, and re-landed three before she departed. She landed 123 convict women at Hobart.

== Fate ==
Majestic was last listed in 1843. The listings since 1840 had no owner, showed her trade as Liverpool–Aberdeen, and carried the remark "wants repair". The 1843 issue available online at the citation has her name struck out.
