= Competitor (ship) =

Convict ship to Australia

History

United Kingdom
- Name: Competitor
- Owner: 1813:Smales & Co.; 1821:G.Langster
- Builder: Smales & Co.
- Launched: 1 January 1813
- Fate: Last listed 1833

General characteristics
- Tons burthen: 423, or 42530/94 (bm)
- Length: 113 ft 6 in (34.6 m)
- Beam: 29 ft 5 in (9.0 m)
- Propulsion: Sail
- Sail plan: Brig
- Armament: 1814:10 × 4-pounder guns; 1815:2 × 6-pounder guns

Competitor was launched at Whitby in 1813. She was initially a West Indiaman and then traded with India. She made two voyages transporting convicts to Australia, one to Van Diemen's Land and one to Port Jackson. She is last listed in 1833.

== Career ==
Competitor cost £10,396 19s 4d. She entered the Register of Shipping in 1814 with Anthony Buck, master, G. Smales, owner, and trade Whitby–West Indies. Competitor only entered Lloyd's Register in the volume for 1815. She entered with trade Portsmouth–London.

On 10 June 1816 Orpheus, Bathgate, master, was sailing from New Orleans to Liverpool when she foundered at 31°N 81°W. Competitor was coming from Jamaica when she saved the crew. Competitor then brought them into London. (Note: Orpheus, of 300 tons (bm), had been launched in America in 1809 but was owned in Liverpool.)

In 1820 Competitor's registry shifted to London. On 6 September Captain G. Low sailed Competitor to Bombay under a license from the British East India Company. Her owner was now Longster.

Convict voyage to Van Dieman's Land (1823): Captain William Ascough sailed from England on 18 March 1823, bound for Van Diemen's Land. (Note: Captain Ascough had just returned on Malabar from a voyage transporting convicts to Van Diemen's Land.) She sailed via the Cape of Good Hope and arrived at Hobart Town on 3 August. Competitor had embarked 160 male convicts and she landed 157. On 24 August she sailed for Sydney with the guard. She also became the first ship to sail up the Hawkesbury River, traveling 30 miles beyond Broken Bay. On 4 February 1824 Competitor sailed for England with a full aro of colonial products, consisting of various kinds of colonial timber, seal skins, elephant seal oil, and two hundred and eighty bales of wool. She reached England by sailing through Cook's Straits, New Zealand, and by way of Cape Horn. She had to stop at San Salvador for water and refreshments.

On 6 December 1824 Competitor was at Portsmouth when her crew refused to put to sea because the wind was blowing so strongly. All the other outward-bound vessels left.

Convict voyage to Port Jackson (1828): Captain John Steward (or Stewart), sailed from England on 13 June 1828, bound for Port Jackson. Competitor arrived there on 10 October. She had embarked 99 female convicts and suffered no convict deaths en route. From Sydney Competitor sailed for Manila.

== Fate ==
Competitor is last listed in both Lloyd's Register and the Register of Shipping in 1833. However the data is stale. She last appeared in Lloyd's List in 1830.
