= York (1819 ship) =

History

United Kingdom
- Name: York
- Owner: 1819: Henry Blanshard; 1823:S. Moates
- Builder: Philip Laing, Monkwearmouth, Southwick
- Launched: 13 February 1819
- Fate: Condemned and sold for breaking up in 1833

General characteristics
- Tons burthen: 429, or 475, or 47630/94 (bm)
- Length: 113 ft 4 1/2 in (34.6 m)
- Beam: 30 ft 6 in (9.3 m)
- Propulsion: Sail

York was a sailing ship built in 1819 at Southwick. She made one voyage to Bombay for the British East India Company (EIC) in 1820. She made three voyages transporting convicts to Australia between 1829 and 1832. She was condemned and sold for breaking up in 1833 at Mauritius.

== Career ==
York entered Lloyd's Register in the supplemental pages for 1819. Her master was Talbart, her owner Blanshard, and her trade London—India.

EIC voyage (1819–1820): The EIC chartered York for one voyage to Bombay. Captain James Talbert (or Talbot) sailed from the Downs on 6 May 1819 and arrived at Bombay on 15 August. York left Bombay on 17 October, reached the Cape of Good Hope on 25 December and Saint Helena on 15 January 1820, and arrived back at the Downs on 23 March.

In 1823 Blanshard sold York to S. Moates. She then traded with India under license from the EIC.

AAC voyage (1825): The newly founded Australian Agricultural Company chartered two ships, York and Brothers, to bring skilled workmen and farm animals to New South Wales. As well as carpenters, masons, bricklayers, woolsorters, shepherds, millers, ploughmen, and their families, York also brought assorted merchandise, 333 sheep, and 8 horned cattle. York, under Captain John Moncrief's command, sailed on 18 June 1825 in company with Brothers from Cowes, Isle of Wight. En route, York called at Rio de Janeiro, and arrived in Port Jackson on Sunday 13 November 1825, beating Brothers by two days.

Convict voyage #1 (1829): Under the command of John Moncreif and surgeon Andrew Henderson, York left London on 11 May 1829 and arrived at Hobart Town on 28 August. She had embarked 192 male convicts and had no deaths en route.

Convict voyage #2 (1830–1831): Under the command of Daniel Leary and surgeon Campbell France, York left Sheerness on 4 September 1830 and arrived at Port Jackson on 7 February 1831. She had embarked 200 male convicts and had two deaths en route.

York departed Port Jackson on 26 March 1831, bound for Batavia, in company with Edward bound for Madras.

Edward returned to Sydney on 3 April after her master, Captain Gilbert, believed that York had been seized by the soldiers sailing aboard her. York too returned to Port Jackson due to adverse winds. The fear of a mutiny turned out to be a misunderstanding.

Convict voyage #3 (1832): Under the command of Richard Spratly and surgeon James McTernan York departed Plymouth on 1 September 1832, and arrived at Hobart Town on 29 December. She had embarked 200 male convicts and had no deaths en route.

== Fate ==
York was last listed in Lloyd's Register in 1833. Her master was Spratley, her owner S. Moates, and her trade London.

York was put into Mauritius in distress on 3 October 1833 as she was sailing from Singapore to London. On 11 November she was surveyed and condemned as a constructive total loss. The next day she was abandoned to the underwriters and sold for breaking up.
