= Brixton (1805 ship) =

History

United States
- Builder: Baltimore, or New York, or North Carolina
- Launched: 1802
- Captured: c.1805

United Kingdom
- Name: Brixton
- Namesake: Brixton
- Acquired: By purchase of a prize
- Fate: Last listed 1842
- Notes: Built of red oak with pitch pine sides

General characteristics
- Tons burthen: 310, or 3103/94, or 317, or 318, or 319 (bm)
- Armament: 14 × 12-pounder carronades

Brixton was built in the United States of America in 1802, with sources disagreeing on where, and under a different name. The British Royal Navy seized her in 1805 and she was sold in prize. She then traded widely, sailing to the West Indies, Canada, Bengal, Australia, and Russia. Between 1835 and 1842 she made two voyages to the southern whale fishery as a whaling ship, and was last listed in 1842.

== Career ==
The Royal Navy seized the vessel that would become Brixton for trading with the French. A prize court condemned her on 26 April 1805 and new owners named her Brixton.

Year	Master	Owner	Trade	Source & notes
1805	J.Venner	Hull & Co.	London–Jamaica	Lloyd's Register (LR)
1806	J.Vener	C.Hall	London–Halifax, Nova Scotia	RS
1810	Ford	Hall & Co.	London transport	LR
1816	C.London	Wilton & Co.	London–Antigua	LR
1818	C.London	Wilton & Co.	London–Cape of Good Hope	LR

Early in May 1819 Brixton, London, master, had to put back into Bengal two days after sailing as she had spring a leak. By 17 August she was at the Cape of Good Hope. She did not sail from the Cape until 23 December.

Year	Master	Owner	Trade	Source & notes
1821	C.London; Sherbrook; Lusk	Wilton & Co. Andrews	London–Cape of Good Hope; Van Diemen's Land	LR

Brixton, Captain Lusk, sailed on 24 April 1821, from London for Australia, She reached Hobart in August and then arrived on 16 September at Sydney. She was not a convict transport per se, but she apparently carried convicts between colonies in both 1821 and on a second voyage in 1823. Most of the passengers aboard Brixton were free passengers, and on this first visit to Australia she brought missionaries. She sailed from Port Jackson on 26 November and Hobart on 29 December for London, via the Cape of Good Hope.

On 19 January 1823 Brixton arrived at Hobart with passengers. She sailed to Sydney from Hobart with a notable passenger, John Dunmore Lang, who had come out to Hobart aboard Andromeda. Lang intended to establish a Presbyterian Church in Sydney.

On 24 May Brixton was at anchor at Sydney during a thunderstorm. A lightning bolt struck her mainmast, destroying it. Later she transported seven convicts to Port Macquarie.

Year	Master	Owner	Trade	Source & notes
1824	J/Lusk; J.Stevens	Andreas	London–Newfoundland; London–Quebec	LR; small repairs 1821 & damages repaired 1824

A report dated Plymouth 30 June 1824 stated that Brixton, Stevens, master, would have to unload to effect repairs. She had been on her way from London to Quebec when she became leaky.

Year	Master	Owner	Trade	Source & notes
1826	J.Stevens	Flinn	London	LR; small repairs 1821 & damages repaired 1824
1827	J.Stevens; Peters	Flinn	London	LR; small repairs 1821 & damages repaired 1824, & good repair 1825

LL printed a letter dated Archangel, 8 September 1826, that reported that Brixton, Peters, master, had arrived there from Newcastle, but had run aground on the bar. Peters had thought it necessary to heave her down, although he did not believe that she had sustained damage.

Year	Master	Owner	Trade	Source & notes
1829	J. Pearson	Burdes	Liverpool–Quebec	LR; good repair 1825
1835	Sparrow; Album	Brown; T.Ward	Newcastle–Quebec; London–South Seas	LR; large repair 1834

=== Whaler ===
1st whaling voyage (1835–1838): Captain J.Elbourn sailed from London in 1835. Brixton returned with 450 casks of whale oil on 14 March 1838.

2nd whaling voyage (1838–1842): Captain John Elbourn sailed from London on 4 July 1838. Brixton returned to London on 2 August 1842 with 300 casks of whale oil.

== Fate ==
Year	Master	Owner	Trade	Source
1842	Album	T.Ward	London–South Seas	LR; large repair 1834

Brixton was last listed in 1842.
