= Coromandel (1820 ship) =

History

United Kingdom
- Builder: George Gooch, executor of the late Peter Everitt Mestaer, King and Queen Dock, Rotherhithe
- Launched: 3 January 1820
- Fate: Broken up 1857

General characteristics
- Tons burthen: 639, or 643, or 645, or 654, or 660 (bm)

Coromandel was launched on the Thames in 1820. Notable voyages include two for the British East India Company, and one transporting convicts to Tasmania. For the first 15 years of her career she primarily sailed to India. Thereafter, she primarily sailed to Australia and New Zealand. She was broken up in 1857.

== Career ==
Coromandel first appeared in Lloyd's Register (LR) in 1820 with Hunter, master, Scott & Co., owners, and trade London–India.

1st EIC voyage (1820–1821): Under the command of Captain William Hunter, she left The Downs on 24 April 1820, bound for Madras. She stopped in at Madeira on 5 May, and reached Madras on 3 August. On her return leg she left Madras on 14 October and stopped at the Cape of Good Hope on 17 December; she arrived at Gravesend, Kent on 6 March 1821.

2nd EIC voyage (1826–1829): The second voyage for the EIC was a one-way voyage to Bengal. Under the command of Captain Thomas Boyes, she left Portsmouth on 12 July 1826. She stopped at Colombo on 19 November, and reached Calcutta on 24 January 1829.

Year	Master	Owner	Trade	Source & notes
1830	Boyes	Plummer & Co.	London–India	LR
1835	T. Boyes	Joad & Co.	London–Madras	LR; thorough repair 1835

Convict voyage (1838): Captain William Loader sailed from London on 14 August 1838. Coromandel arrived at Hobart 26 October. She had embarked 340 male convicts, of whom 338 disembarked at Hobart.

Year	Master	Owner	Trade	Source & notes
1840	W. Loader	T. Oldfield	London–New Zealand	LR; thorough repair 1835
1845	Lobbin; Fraser	T. Oldfield	London	LR; thorough repair 1835 & large repair 1844
1850		Ingram & Co.	London–Port Phillip	LR; large repair 1844
1856	J. Byron	Ingram & Co.	London–Australia	LR; large repair 1844, & keelson and repairs 1853

== Fate ==
Coromandel was last listed in 1856.

A Coromandel of 660 tons burthen, Anderson, master was wrecked on 28 September 1856, on the Ridge Sand, in the North Sea off the coast of Winterton-on-Sea, Norfolk whilst on a voyage from Arkhangelsk to London. Her crew were rescued by the schooner Falcon and a fishing smack. Coromandel was subsequently beached at Great Yarmouth, Norfolk.

By another report she was broken up in 1857.
