= Medway (1810 ship) =

History

United Kingdom
- Name: Medway
- Namesake: River Medway
- Builder: John King, Frindsbury, (or Upnor)
- Launched: 23 June 1810
- Fate: Condemned 1840

General characteristics
- Tons burthen: 435, or 449 (bm)
- Armament: 2 × 9-pounder guns + 8 × 12-pounder carronades

Medway was launched at Frindsbury in 1810. She made two voyages between 1820 and 1825 transporting convicts to Van Diemen's Land. Medway was ondemned at Calcutta in late 1840.

== Career ==
Medway enters Lloyd's Register in 1810 with Peterson, master, Taylor & Co., owner, and trade London–Jamaica.

Year	Master	Owner	Trade	Source
1815	J. Mackie; W. Graves	Irwin	London–Tobago	Lloyd's Register (LR)
1820	B. Wight	Irwin	London–Calcutta	Register of Shipping (RS)

Convict voyage #1 (1820–1821): Captain Borthwick Wight sailed Medway from on 13 November 1820. She arrived at Hobart Town on 13 March 1821. She had embarked 156 convicts, none of whom died en route. The 53rd Regiment of Foot provided the guard. Medway sailed on to Sydney, arriving there on 27 March; she carried a number of prisoners being transferred from Hobart to Newcastle, New South Wales. Newcastle had become a place where the most dangerous convicts were sent to dig in the coal mines as punishment for their crimes.

Convict voyage #2 (1825): Captain Wight sailed Medway from Land's End on 22 August 1825 and arrived in Hobart on 9 December 1825. She had embarked 172 male convicts. One source states that she had no deaths en route; another source states that she had four. The 57th Regiment of Foot provided the guard.

Year	Master	Owner	Trade	Source
1830	B. Wright	J. Pirie	Cork–New South Wales	LR
1835	B. Weight	Weight & Co.	London	LR
1840	B. Weight	Weight & Co.	London	LR

== Fate ==
Medway, Griffith, master, from Sydney, was condemned at Calcutta in 1840. Her hull was sold at auction for Rupees 4,500. Medway was last listed in Lloyd's Register in 1841.
