= Brothers (1815 ship) =

British East Indiaman, convict transport, and merchant ship (1815–1837)

History

United Kingdom
- Name: Brothers
- Owner: 1815: W. and E. Chapman; 1820: Aaron Chapman
- Builder: W. S. Chapman and Co.
- Launched: 1815
- Fate: Last listed 1837.

General characteristics
- Tons burthen: 425, or 42554/94, or 431 (bm)
- Propulsion: Sail

Brothers was built in Whitby, England in 1815. She made one voyage for the British East India Company (EIC), and two transporting convicts to Australia. Afterwards she traded across the Atlantic, primarily to Quebec, and was last listed in 1837.

== Career ==
Her registration transferred to London in 1817.

EIC voyage (1820–1821): Captain Ralph Stamp sailed from The Downs on 2 May 1820, bound for Bombay. Brothers reached Bombay on 10 August. Homeward bound, she was at the Cape of Good Hope on 25 December. She reached Saint Helena on 17 January 1821 and arrived at Gravesend on 22 March.

She was repaired in 1823.

First convict voyage (1823–1824): Under the command of Captain Charles Motley she sailed from The Downs, England to Hobart and Sydney. She departed on 6 December 1823 and arrived at Hobart on 15 April 1824. She then arrived at Sydney on 7 May 1824. She had embarked 90 female convicts. She landed 50 convicts at Hobart and 39 convicts at Sydney. One convict had died on the voyage.

AAC voyage (1825): The newly-founded Australian Agricultural Company chartered two ships, Brothers and York, to bring skilled workmen and farm animals to New South Wales. Brothers, under the command of Captain Moseley [sic] and with 370 sheep and 11 horses aboard, sailed in company with York from Cowes, Isle of Wight, on 18 June 1825. It arrived in Port Jackson on Tuesday 15 November 1825, having been beaten there by York by two days.

Second convict voyage (1826–1827): Captain Motley sailed from Cork, Ireland, on 3 October 1826, bound for Sydney. Brothers arrived in Sydney on 2 February 1827. She had embarked 161 female convicts; three convicts died on the voyage. She sailed on to Sydney, and then on 17 April 1827 for Batavia in company with Andromeda.

Year	Master	Owner	Trade	Source & notes
1830	Motley	Chapman	London–Quebec	Register of Shipping; repairs: small (1826), large (1828), & damages (1829)
1835	C. Motley	Chapman	Liverpool–Mobile; Liverpool–Quebec	Lloyd's Register; large repair (1835)

== Fate ==
Brothers was last listed in Lloyd's Register in 1837 as being at London with Bartholomew, master, and Chapman, owner.
