= Andromeda (1819) =

1819 408-ton English ship

History

United Kingdom
- Name: Andromeda
- Namesake: Andromeda
- Launched: 17 March 1819, Sunderland
- Fate: Last listed 1847

General characteristics
- Tons burthen: 383, or 400, or 408, or 418 (bm)
- Length: 107 ft 10 in (32.9 m)
- Beam: 29 ft 2 in (8.9 m)
- Propulsion: Sail
- Notes: Two decks & three masts

Andromeda was built in Sunderland, England in 1819. Initially she made one voyage to India, sailing under a licence from the British East India Company. She then started sailing to Australia, carrying voluntary and involuntary migrants. She made four voyages transporting convicts: one voyage to Van Diemen's Land and three to New South Wales. She continued to trade, primarily to Australia. Her last voyage was to Ichaboe Island. She was last listed in 1847.

== Career ==
Andromeda first appeared in the Register of Shipping (RS), in 1820.

Year	Master	Owner	Trade	Source
1820	R.Crosby	R.Reay	Sunderland–London	RS
1821	R.Crosby; Stewart	R.Reay; Stoveld	Sunderland–London; London–Bengal	RS

In 1813, the British East India Company (EIC) had lost its monopoly on the trade between India and Britain. British ships were then free to sail to India or the Indian Ocean under a licence from the EIC. On 3 June 1821, she sailed from Gravesend, Kent to Madras, arriving there on 3 October. On 8 November, she arrived at Bengal. On 6 June 1822, she arrived back at Gravesend, having come from Bengal, Madras, and St Helena.

Year	Master	Owner	Trade	Source
1822	Stewart; Muddle	R.Reay	London–Bengal; London–New South Wales	RS

On 26 October 1822, Andromeda, [James] Muddle, master, arrived at Deal from Leith, and sailed for Van Diemen's Land (VDL). She arrived at Hobart Town on 7 May 1823, with cargo and passengers, having left England in December and having touched at Rio de Janeiro. She was the sixth vessel to sail to Van Diemen's Land from Leith, following Skelton's commercially successful voyage in 1820, when Skelton was the first vessel to sail directly from Scotland for VDL. Andromeda also brought a dozen merino sheep that had been brought to Leith from Hamburg for re-export. A notable passenger was John Dunmore Lang, who then sailed from Hobart to Sydney aboard Brixton, with the intent to form a Presbyterian Church. Most of Lang's fellow travellers to Hobart were settlers with grants and some were already agriculturalists. (Note: One of the passengers, who had come out with his family and servants, successfully sued Muddle for ill-treatment on the voyage out. John Dunmore Lang too objected to Muddle's behaviour on the way to VDL.) On 3 July Andromeda sailed for Sydney, and on 5 September she sailed from Sydney for Calcutta.

Andromeda proceeded to make other voyages to Australia. On one voyage, on 27 May 1825, near Cape Verde, a pirate vessel flying American colours chased Andromeda for some hours.

1st convict voyage (1826–1827): Captain James Muddle sailed from London on 14 October 1826, and arrived at Hobart on 28 February 1827. She had embarked 146 male convicts, three of whom died on the voyage. One officer and 30 other ranks from the 39th regiment of Foot provided the guard. On 19 March, she sailed for Sydney with the guard, five prisoners to be transferred to Norfolk Island, and three deserters from HMS Rainbow. She arrived at Sydney on 29 March. She sailed on 17 April 1827, for Batavia in company with Brothers.

2nd convict voyage (1830): Captain Robert Parkin sailed from Cork, Ireland on 28 August 1830. Andromeda arrived at Sydney, Australia on 18 December 1830. She had embarked 180 male convicts, eight of whom died on the voyage. One officer and 28 other ranks from the 17th Regiment of Foot provided the guard. (Note: The 17th Foot was later involved in two documented massacres of Aboriginal people. The massacres were reprisals for attacks on Europeans.)

In January 1831, the whaler Elizabeth came into Sydney Harbour with 361 tons of whale oil, which was estimated to have been worth £21,600, the most valuable cargo brought to harbour to that point. Elizabeth belonged to the merchant Robert Campbell. Campbell engaged Andromeda to carry Elizabeth's oil back to England. She also took, as passengers for London, his wife Margaret and daughter Margaret-Jane. On 3 April, Andromeda sailed for England. At end-August, she ran aground on the Tongue Sand in the Thames estuary. Three smacks came to assist her while other vessels took off cargo; she was refloated a few days later. The smacks sued for salvage, but the Admiralty Court rejected their claim after two Court-appointed masters from Trinity House testified that the smacks had not performed services that would warrant their receiving salvage. On appeal, the court reversed the first judgement, awarding £500 to be shared between the three smacks, and £500 to seven other vessels that had lightened Andromeda.

3rd convict voyage (1832–1833): Captain Benjamin Gales departed Portsmouth on 17 November 1832, and arrived in Sydney on 11 March 1833. Andromeda had embarked 186 male convicts; four convicts died on the voyage. (Note: Press reports stated that Andromeda had arrived with 183 male prisoners.) Two officers and 29 other ranks of the 21st Regiment of Foot provided the guard. Andromeda also brought £10,000 in specie. On 26 April Andromeda sailed for Sincapore, in ballast.

4th convict voyage (1834): Under the command of Benjamin Gales, Andromeda departed from Cork on 25 May 1834, and arrived in Sydney on 17 September 1834. She had embarked 175 female convicts; two convicts died during the voyage. Andromeda sailed on 29 December, with sundries. She was going to Western Port to load bark for the London market. She returned to Port Jackson with 200 tons of mimosa bark. In May, Andromeda, from Launceston, for London, put back to Sydney, leaky. She had been out 500 miles when she had to put back. She was surveyed and had to unload her cargo of wool and bark. At Launceston her crew had a small altercation with some Aborigines that resulted in some minor injuries on both sides, but no deaths. Her leakiness was attributed to her having laid on the ground at every ebb tide, and having twice grounded as she left the Tamar River. By 5 August repairs had been effected and Andromeda was reloading. On 13 September she sailed for London. She entered inbound at customs in London 7 March 1836.

Year	Master	Owner	Trade	Source & notes
1836	Willis; Ford	Ward	London–New York; Hull–Sierra Leone	LR; new wales and topsides 1829, new topsides and large repair 1836

After her return from Australia a new owner acquired Andromeda and her homeport became Hull. On 14 February 1837, Andromeda was in the Downs, on her way from Hull to Sierra Leone. Her crew refused to sail further. Magistrates sentenced the seven men to 21 days of hard labour at the House of Corrections.

Year	Master	Owner	Trade	Source & notes
1839	W.Coltish	W.Ward	Liverpool–Hobart town	LR; new wales and topsides 1829, new topsides and large repair 1836

Andromeda, Coltish, master, made two voyages to Tasmania, each time returning via Calcutta, the Cape, and St Helena.

Year	Master	Owner	Trade	Source & notes
1842	W.Coltish; Pearson	W.Ward	Liverpool–Hobart Town; London	LR; new wales and topsides 1829, new topsides and large repair 1836, & large repair 1839
1845	Pearson; Sutton	W.Ward	London	LR; new wales and topsides 1829, large repair 1836, large repair 1839, some repairs 1843

Andromeda, Sutton, master, returned to England from Sydney 28 July 1844. She was next reported to have returned to England on 24 April 1845, from Ichaboe. She had arrived at Table Bay on 18 September 1844, and sailed on to Ichaboe on 29 November.

Andromeda was at Ichaboe to participate in the guano "gold rush". In the early 1840s the Peruvian government had raised its royalty demands on Peruvian guano, the main source of the fertilizer for the United Kingdom. Andrew Livingstone, was a retired master-mariner, living in Liverpool, where he had a school of navigation. In 1842 he read an account published in New York in 1832, by Benjamin Morrell, an American sealing captain, who wrote about having landed at Ichaboe in 1828, and seen massive deposits of guano. Livingstone was eventually able to convince some Liverpool investors to send out a small exploration expedition of three vessels. By 1844, 286 British vessels had visited Ichaboe, and in 1845, 679 vessels. The guano deposits were quickly exhausted.

== Fate ==
Andromeda was last listed in Lloyd's Register in 1847, but with no homeport and no next voyage.
