= Phoenix (1810 ship) =

History

United Kingdom
- Name: Phoenix
- Namesake: Phoenix
- Owner: John Blankett
- Builder: Robert Davy, Topsham, Devon
- Launched: 12 November 1810
- Fate: Wrecked 19 July 1829

General characteristics
- Tons burthen: 493, or 49324/94, or 495, or 500 (bm)
- Armament: 1813-15: 9 × 18-pounder guns + 2 × 9-pounder carronades (Note: The guns are unconventional in size, and the number is uneven, something that is unusual. The two carronades are of a dimension that is unusual for carronades. This would suggest that someone in filling out the form, or transcribing it, exchanged guns for carronades.); 1829:2 guns

Phoenix was a merchant vessel launched in 1810. The British East India Company (EIC) chartered her to make one voyage to Madras and Bengal between 1820 and 1821. She then made one voyage transporting convicts to Tasmania in 1822, and two to New South Wales, one in 1826 and one in 1828. She was wrecked in 1829.

== Career ==
The supplement to Lloyd's Register for 1811, lists Phoenix as one-year-old, with Wilson, master, and Blacket & Co., owner. It gives her trade as London transport, amended to London-West Indies.

By 1813, Phoenix had switched from the London-West Indies trade to simply being a general transport out of London. She also became quite heavily armed.

=== EIC voyage (1820-21) ===
The EIC chartered Phoenix for one voyage. Captain William Gordon sailed Phoenix from Falmouth on 12 June 1820, bound for Bengal and Madras. She reached São Tiago on 28 June, and arrived at Calcutta on 14 October. Homeward bound, she was at Diamond Harbour on 29 December, and Kedgeree on 21 January 1821. She reached Madras on 3 February, and arrived at The Downs on 14 July.

=== Convict transport to Van Diemen's Land (1822) ===
Captain Thomas Weatherhead and surgeon Evan Evans sailed Phoenix from Portsmouth on 5 January 1822. She sailed via Rio de Janeiro, and arrived at Hobart, Van Diemen's Land (Tasmania), on 20 May, after a voyage of 135 days. She transported 184 male convicts, of whom two died on the voyage. A detachment of the 3rd Regiment of Foot provided the guard. Brevet Lieutenant-Colonel Cameron commanded the detachment, assisted by Ensign Pigot. The guard brought with them ten women and ten children. After landing the prisoners on 25 May, Phoenix sailed to Sydney, where she landed the guards and their families.

=== First convict voyage to New South Wales (1826) ===
Captain Alexander Anderson sailed from Dublin and arrived at Port Jackson on 25 December 1826. Phoenix had embarked 190 male convicts and she disembarked 189, one convict having died on the way.

=== Second convict voyage to New South Wales (1828) ===
Captain Thomas Curzens sailed from Spithead on 28 March 1828, and arrived at Port Jackson on 14 July. Phoenix had embarked 190 convicts and she landed all of them.

== Fate ==
Phoenix was wrecked at Simon's Bay, South Africa, on 19 July 1829. Her master's name was Couzens, and she had sailed from Ceylon carrying passengers, none of whom were lost, and a cargo of sundries, part of which was saved. She wrecked on the seaward side of what is now known as Phoenix Shoal, in the bay (34°11.388′S 18°26.898′E).

== See also ==
- Shipwrecks of Cape Town
