= London (1832 ship) =

History

United Kingdom
- Name: London
- Builder: Wigram's, Blackwall
- Launched: 14 May 1832
- Fate: Last listed 1869

General characteristics
- Tons burthen: Pre-1836 law: 61184/94, or 612, or 650, or 700 (bm); New law:568 (bm)
- Length: Originally: 133 ft 2 in (40.6 m); Later: 136 ft 2 in (41.5 m)
- Beam: Originally: 31 ft 9 in (9.7 m); Later: 31 ft 8 in (9.7 m)
- Depth of hold: Originally: 21 ft 6 in (6.6 m); Later: 21 ft 6 in (6.6 m)
- Complement: 30
- Notes: Sheathed with yellow metal 1839.

London was launched in 1832 by Wigrams for Money and H. L. Wigram to carry passengers to India. From 1840 she made two voyages from the United Kingdom carrying immigrants to New Zealand for the New Zealand Company. She also made two voyages transporting convicts from the United Kingdom to Tasmania. She then became a transport for several years before returning to trading between Newcastle and Spain. She ran into a barque in 1866 with the result that the barque's crew had to abandon their vessel. London was last listed in 1869.

== Career ==
London first appeared in Lloyd's Register (LR) in 1832.

Year	Master	Owner	Trade	Source
1832	Wimble	Wigrams	London–Madras	LR

On 4 June 1832 London, Captain John Wimble, was due to sail to Madras and Calcutta. London sailed on 19 June, left Madras on 25 September, and arrived at Calcutta on 3 October. On this voyage London carried 300 tons of coal that she had loaded in London. While she was at Calcutta a portion of this cargo ignited spontaneously; the burning cargo was removed. London sustained some damage. This was the first of several voyages to Calcutta and return that London and Wimble made.

1st immigrant voyage to New Zealand (1840): London sailed under Captain Henry Shuttleworth for Wellington, leaving the Downs on 19 August 1840 and arriving at Wellington on 12 December. She arrived with 193 immigrants and 43 cabin passengers. She had left with some 228 immigrants and passengers. She sailed to Calcutta, and left there for London on 27 May 1841. She reached the Cape of Good Hope on 3 August and arrived back in London on 11 October.

2nd immigrant voyage to New Zealand (1842): London, Captain Joseph Thomas Attwood, master, left Gravesend in January 1842. She arrived in Wellington on 1 May 1842 with 182 immigrants.

1st convict voyage (1844): On 23 March 1844 London, under Captain John T. Attwood, brought 250 male convicts from Plymouth to Tasmania, arriving on 9 July. She suffered no convict deaths on the voyage.

Year	Master	Owner	Trade	Source & notes
1845	Attwood; Shuttleworth	Shuttleworth	London–Madras; London–Calcutta; London–Trinidad	LR; damages repaired 1843
1846	Shuttleworth	Shuttleworth	London–Trinidad; London–Madras	LR; damages repaired 1843 & thorough repair 1846

In 1847 London was sold for £5,900 to Teighe & Co. The owners were Thomas Dominick James Teighe (32/64), Charles Teighe (8/64), Robert Dyet (8/64), William Dix (8/64), and Frederick Leachey (8/64). LR did not catch up with the change of ownership and a change in destination until the 1851 issue.

2nd convict voyage (1850–1851): Captain J. Sceales sailed from Dublin on 20 December 1850. London arrived in Hobart on 10 March 1851. she had embarked 288 male convicts and suffered three convict deaths on the voyage.

Year	Master	Owner	Trade	Source & notes
1851	J.Sceales; H.Tillman	Shuttleworth; Teighe & Co.	London–Port Phillip	LR
1854	H.Tillman	Teighe & Co.	London transport	LR; small repairs 1852
1857	J.Young	Teighe & Co.	London–India	LR; small repairs 1852 & 1856

New owners in 1858–1859 transferred London's registry to Newcastle.

Year	Master	Owner	Trade	Source & notes
1859	W.Ramsey	J.Carr	Shields–Mediterranean	LR; small repairs 1856 & 1859
1861	W.Ramsey	J.Carr	Shields–Spain	LR; small repairs 1856, 1859, & 1862
1866	W.Ramsey	J.Carr	Shields–Spain	LR; small repairs 1856, 1859, & 1862

In late 1866 London, Ramsey, master, of Newcastle, was sailing to Newcastle from Cartagena, Spain, when she ran into Palmen, Hendrickson, master. Palman's crew abandoned Palman in a sinking state. On 14 December the Norwegian barque Nanna, Hansen, master, rescued Captain Hendrickson and eight crewmembers at 40°N 12°W.

== Fate ==
London was last listed in LR in 1869 (the online copy of LR for 1870 is missing pages), with data unchanged from 1866. She does not appear in the 1871 volume.
