= Enchantress (1828 ship) =

History

United Kingdom
- Name: Enchantress
- Builder: Joseph Tippitt, Bristol
- Launched: 18 September 1828
- Fate: Wrecked

General characteristics
- Tons burthen: 401 (bm)
- Length: 112 ft 6 in (34.3 m)
- Beam: 28 ft 1 in (8.6 m)

Enchantress was launched in 1828 at Bristol as a West Indiaman. She then traded with India as an East Indiaman, sailing under a license issued by the British East India Company (EIC). She next transported convicts to Van Diemen's Land. She was wrecked in February 1837 at Bermuda.

== Career ==
Enchantress first appeared in Lloyd's Register (LR) in 1829 with W.Drew, master and owner, and trade Bristol-Saint Vincent.

In 1813, the EIC had lost its monopoly over all trade between India and Britain. British ships were then free to sail to India or the Indian Ocean under a license from the EIC.

On 9 April 1830, Captain Drew sailed for Calcutta under a license from the EIC.

| Year | Master | Owner | Trade | Source |
|---|---|---|---|---|
| 1833 | Drew; Canney | W.Drew | London–New South Wales | Register of Shipping |

On 13 April 1833, Captain Thomas Canney sailed from Portsmouth, bound for Van Diemen's Land, carrying convicts. Enchantress arrived at Hobart Town on 31 July. She had embarked 200 male convicts and arrived with 199, one having died on the voyage.

== Fate ==
Enchantress was on a voyage from Liverpool, to New York when she struck a reef on 5 February 1837 off Bermuda and sank. All on board were rescued.

Her master was Captain George Donaldson, and she was carrying 66 or 74 Irish emigrants, two of whom died on the voyage. Her destination was New York but bad weather and damage to the vessel had led Donaldson to make for Bermuda.
