= List of ship launches in 1825 =

The list of ship launches in 1825 includes a chronological list of some ships launched in 1825.

Date	Ship	Class	Builder	Location	Country	Notes
8 January	Trinacria	Paddle steamer	Scott & Sons	Greenock	United Kingdom	For John Scott.
20 January	Unnamed	Brig	Robert Wigram	Blackwall	United Kingdom	For Colombian Pearl Fishery Association.
22 January	Enterprise	Paddle steamer	Gordons & Co.	Deptford	United Kingdom	For private owner.
January	Caesar	Merchantman		River Thames	United Kingdom	For Johnson & Maeburn.
5 February	Crocodile	Steamship	Graham	Harwich	United Kingdom	For Post Office Packet Service.
9 February	Doncaster	Barque	Wigram & Green	Blackwall	United Kingdom	For Mr. Marshall.
19 February	Childe Harold	East Indiaman	Jabez Bayley	Ipswich	United Kingdom	For Robert Granger.
19 February	Leveret	Cherokee-class brig-sloop		Portsmouth Dockyard	United Kingdom	For Royal Navy.
19 February	Mosquito	Cherokee-class brig-sloop		Portsmouth Dockyard	United Kingdom	For Royal Navy.
19 February	Volage	Sixth rate		Portsmouth Dockyard	United Kingdom	For Royal Navy.
20 February	Lapwing	Cherokee-class brig-sloop		Chatham Dockyard	United Kingdom	For Royal Navy.
8 March	Manchester	Merchantman		New York	United States	For private owner.
17 March	Lalla Rookh	Snow	Thomas Metcalfe & Son	South Shields	United Kingdom	For Thomas & John Fenwick.
19 March	Fairfield	Snow		Aberdeen	United Kingdom	For John Lumsden.
2 April	Atalante	Vestale-class frigate		Lorient	France	For French Navy.
5 April	The Liverpool	Schooner	William Bailey	Woodbridge	United Kingdom	For private owner.
6 April	Frances	Steamship	Lomax and Wilson	Tranmere	United Kingdom	For Mr. Williams.
9 April	Volage	Gazelle-class schooner		Toulon	France	For French Navy.
19 April	Mary	Schooner	Cordingley	Ipswich	United Kingdom	For Mr. Cobbold.
22 April	Surprise	Gazelle-class schooner		Toulon	France	For French Navy.
22 April	Roxburgh Castle	East Indiaman	Wigram & Green	Blackwall	United Kingdom	For Wigram & Green.
25 April	Dryade	Merchantman	William Scott & Sons	Bristol	United Kingdom	For Mr. Davi(d)son.
25 April	Alacrity	Cygne-class brig		Toulon	France	For French Navy.
April	Elizabeth	Full-rigged ship	John Crookenden	Cochin	India	For Mr. Chapman.
2 May	Rossia	Malyi-class frigate	B. F. Stoke	Saint Petersburg	Russia	For Imperial Russian Navy.
3 May	Parmelia	Barque	Shepherd, Campbell & Jeffrey	Wolfe's Cove	(United Kingdom of Great Britain and Ireland) Upper Canada	For private owner.
4 May	Calpe	Steamship	James Duke	Dover	United Kingdom	For private owner.
5 May	Ranger	Sloop	William Bailey	Woodbridge	United Kingdom	For private owner.
9 May	Palinure	Cygne-class brig		Toulon	France	For French Navy.
19 May	Formidable	Canopus-class ship of the line	George Parkin	Chatham Dockyard	United Kingdom	For Royal Navy.
19 May	Mutine	Cherokee-class brig-sloop		Plymouth	United Kingdom	For Royal Navy.
19 May	Pendarves	Smack	Tredwin	Padstow	United Kingdom	For private owner.
19 May	Powerful	Canopus-class ship of the line		Chatham Dockyard	United Kingdom	For Royal Navy.
19 May	Sheldrake	Cherokee-class brig-sloop		Pembroke Dockyard	United Kingdom	For Royal Navy.
19 May	The Howard	Cutter	Sainty	Mistley	United Kingdom	For private owner.
21 May	Elena	Provornyi-class frigate	A. M. Kurochkin	Arkhangelsk	Russia	For Imperial Russian Navy.
21 May	Tsar Konstantin	Selafail-class ship of the line	A. M. Kurochkin	Arkhangelsk	Russia	For Imperial Russian Navy.
22 May	Lord Melville	Merchantman	George Taylor	Quebec	(United Kingdom of Great Britain and Ireland) Lower Canada	For private owner.
May	Romulus	Barque			United Kingdom	For private owner.
1 June	Flèche	Gazelle-class schooner		Rochefort	France	For French Navy.
1 June	Railleuse	Gazelle-class schooner		Rochefort	France	For French Navy.
4 June	Singapore	Schooner	Swinton	Singapore	(United Kingdom of Great Britain and Ireland) Singapore	For private owner.
16 June	Nautilus	Yacht	Ratsey	Cowes	United Kingdom	For Lord Grantham.
16 June	Susquehanna	Frigate		Washington Navy Yard	United States	For United States Navy.
17 June	Aeolus	Modified Leda-class frigate		Deptford Dockyard	United Kingdom	For Royal Navy.
18 June	Lee	Steamship	Wilson	Chester	United Kingdom	For St George Steam Packet Company.
18 June	Lord Blayney	Steamship	James Rathbone	Liverpool	United Kingdom	For St George Steam Packet Company.
30 June	Alcyone	Gazelle-class schooner		Bayonne	France	For French Navy.
30 June	Glenburnie	Schooner	Adamson	Aberdeen	United Kingdom	For Mr Johnstone.
30 June	Baucis	Gazelle-class schooner		Bayonne	France	For French Navy.
1 July	Druid	Seringapatam-class frigate	Sydenham Teast	Pembroke Dockyard	United Kingdom	For Royal Navy.
2 July	Unnamed	Steamship	John Watson	Liverpool	United Kingdom	For private owner.
4 July	Ellen	Merchantman	Farrington	Newcastle upon Tyne	United Kingdom	For private owner.
16 July	Harpy	Cherokee-class brig-sloop		Chatham Dockyard	United Kingdom	For Royal Navy.
18 July	Amherst	Sloop		Bombay	India	For British East Indian Company.
18 July	Arabian	Merchantman	Mottershed and Hayes	Liverpool	United Kingdom	For John & Robert Mather.
18 July	Commerce	Steam yacht	Grayson and Leadley	Liverpool	United Kingdom	For Liverpool and Dublin Steam Navigation Company.
19 July	Britannia	Steamship	Dawson and Pearson	Liverpool	United Kingdom	For City of Dublin Steam Packet Company.
19 July	Comet	Paddle steamer	Humble and Hurry	Liverpool	United Kingdom	For private owner.
19 July	Etna	Paddle steamer	Humble and Hurry	Liverpool	United Kingdom	For private owner.
19 July	Roman	Merchantman		New York	United States	For private owner
21 July	Bolivar	Steamship	Grayson and Leadley	Liverpool	United Kingdom	For private owner.
28 July	Cygne	Cygne-class brig		Lorient	France	For French Navy.
28 July	Vésuve	Vésuve-class bomb vessel		Bayonne	France	For French Navy.
30 July	Mermaid	Leda-class frigate		Chatham Dockyard	United Kingdom	For Royal Navy.
July	Bee	Merchantman			United Kingdom	For private owner.
July	Pomona	Brig		Montrose	United Kingdom	For private owner.
July	Sir Francis Burton	Merchantman		Quebec	(United Kingdom of Great Britain and Ireland) Upper Canada	For private owner.
1 August	Huskisson	Barque		Pictou	(United Kingdom of Great Britain and Ireland) Upper Canada	For private owner.
12 August	Surveillante	Surveillante-class frigate	Aimé Jean Louis Nicholas René Le Dean	Lorient	France	For French Navy.
12 August	Paragon	Brig		Saint John	(United Kingdom of Great Britain and Ireland) Upper Canada	For private owner.
13 August	Faucon	Cygne-class brig		Rochefort	France	For French Navy.
13 August	Grenadier	Cygne-class brig		Rochefort	France	For French Navy.
16 August	Alerte	Cygne-class brig		Lorient	France	For French Navy.
16 August	St. Patrick	Paddle steamer	Clarke & Nicholson	Liverpool	United Kingdom	For St George Steam Packet Company.
16 August	Zeeuw	Third rate		Vlissingen	Netherlands	For Royal Netherlands Navy.
17 August	Thetis	Steamship	Graham	Harwich	United Kingdom	For Post Office Packet Service.
21 August	David	Brig			United Kingdom	For private owner.
30 August	African	Alban-class paddle steamer	Sir Robert Seppings	Woolwich Dockyard	United Kingdom	For Royal Navy.
30 August	Morning Star	Barque	Tindall	Scarborough	United Kingdom	For Mr. Tindall.
30 August	Success	Atholl-class corvette		Pembroke Dockyard	United Kingdom	For Royal Navy.
31 August	The Ceres	Steamship	George Bayley	Ipswich	United Kingdom	For private owner.
August	Ariel	Cutter yacht	Ratsey & Sons	Cowes	United Kingdom	For private owner.
August	De Rijn	Paddle steamer	Hoogendijk	Capelle aan den IJssel	Netherlands	For Nederlandsche Stoomboot Maatschappij.
August	Midas	Pilot boat	Miller, Hanson, and White	Cowes	United Kingdom	For James Caws.
August	Pursuit	Pilot boat	Miller, Hanson, and White	Cowes	United Kingdom	For William Burridge.
August	Hound	Cutter	Miller, Hanson, and White	Cowes	United Kingdom	For Board of Customs.
7 September	Ioann Zlatoust	Third rate	A. K. Kaverznev	Kherson	Russia	For Imperial Russian Navy.
12 September	Dolphin	Yacht	Charles Miller	Cowes	United Kingdom	For Cowes Yacht Club.
14 September	Myrtle	Cherokee-class brig-sloop		Portsmouth Dockyard	United Kingdom	For Royal Navy.
14 September	Princess Charlotte	Princess Charlotte-class ship of the line	Nicholas Diddams	Portsmouth Dockyard	United Kingdom	For Royal Navy.
19 September	Gangut	Ship of the line		Saint Petersburg	Russia	For Imperial Russian Navy.
28 September	Montague	Brig	Morrice	Eling	United Kingdom	For private owner.
September	Fancy	Sloop		Gainsborough	United Kingdom	For private owner.
September	Lady Clifton	Brig	Henry Tucker	Bideford	United Kingdom	For Mr. Day.
1 October	Hango-udd	Ship of the line		Saint Petersburg	Russia	For Imperial Russian Navy.
5 October	Havfruen	Frigate		Holmen Naval Base	Denmark	For Royal Danish Navy.
7 October	Janet	Brig	John Duncanson	Alloa	United Kingdom	For private owner.
11 October	Commerce	Sloop	Paton	Anstruther	United Kingdom	For private owner.
13 October	Runnymede	Barque	William Wallis	Blackwall, London	United Kingdom	For J. Krieg.
13 October	West Indian	West Indiaman		Newcastle upon Tyne	United Kingdom	For John Renwick.
15 October	Boston	Sloop of war		Boston Navy Yard	United States	For United States Navy.
26 October	Sambre	Frigate		Amsterdam	Netherlands	For Royal Netherlands Navy.
28 October	Crocodile	Atholl-class corvette		Chatham Dockyard	United Kingdom	For Royal Navy.
29 October	Lord Lowther	East Indiaman	Barnard	Deptford	United Kingdom	For British East India Company.
31 October	City	Merchantman		Carlisle	United Kingdom	For private owner.
October	Canadian	Full-rigged ship		Quebec City	(United Kingdom of Great Britain and Ireland) Upper Canada	For private owner.
October	Mary	Barque		Saint John	(United Kingdom of Great Britain and Ireland) Colony of New Brunswick	For private owner.
October	Sir Francis N. Burton	Merchantman	Finch	Quebec	(United Kingdom of Great Britain and Ireland) Upper Canada	For private owner.
October	Victory	Brig		Miramichi	(United Kingdom of Great Britain and Ireland) Colony of New Brunswick	For private owner.
9 November	Edinburgh	East Indiaman	Wigram & Green	Blackwall	United Kingdom	For Fairlie, Bonham & Co.
10 November	Suffolk	Paddle steamer	George Bayley and Co.	Ipswich	United Kingdom	For private owner.
11 November	Eudora	Brig	G. H. Anderson	Leith	United Kingdom	For private owner.
12 November	Abercrombie Robinson	East Indiaman	Wigram & Green	Blackwall	United Kingdom	For British East India Company.
24 November	Maria	Smack	Brown	Montrose	United Kingdom	For Arbroath and London Shipping Company.
25 November	James M'Inroy	West Indiaman	Steele & Son	Greenock	United Kingdom	For M'Inroy, Parker & Co.
26 November	George the Fourth	East Indiaman	Thomas Pitcher	Northfleet	United Kingdom	For British East India Company.
12 December	Superior	Brig	T. & J. Brocklebank	Whitehaven	United Kingdom	For private owner.
December	Tantivy	Schooner	Hocking	Stonehouse	United Kingdom	For Messrs. Fox and Son.
Spring	Enterprise	Brig		Londonderry	(United Kingdom of Great Britain and Ireland) Upper Canada	For private owner.
Unknown date	Advance	Snow	Tiffin	Sunderland	United Kingdom	For R. Scurfield.
Unknown date	Agincourt	West Indiaman		Monmouth	United Kingdom	For Charles Pinney and Robert Edward Case.
Unknown date	Alert	Snow	J. Brunton	Sunderland	United Kingdom	For W. Herring.
Unknown date	Amaranth	Snow	J. Allison	Sunderland	United Kingdom	For M. Robson Jr.
Unknown date	Amethyst	Merchantman		Monkwearmouth	United Kingdom	For private owner.
Unknown date	Ann	Merchantman	John M. & William Gales	Sunderland	United Kingdom	For Joseph Parkin.
Unknown date	Avon	Paddle steamer	Mr. Graham		United Kingdom	For General Post Office.
Unknown date	Baron of Renfrew	Disposable ship	Charles Wood	Quebec	(United Kingdom of Great Britain and Ireland) Upper Canada	For private owner.
Unknown date	Bonavista	Snow		Sunderlands	United Kingdom	For R. Towns & Co.
Unknown date	Brocklebank	Paddle steamer	T. Brocklebank	Deptford	United Kingdom	For General Steam Navigation Company.
Unknown date	Burrell	Barque		Newcastle upon Tyne	United Kingdom	For private owner.
Unknown date	Bywell	Snow	John M. & William Gales	Sunderland	United Kingdom	For John M. % William Gales.
Unknown date	Cambridge	Full-rigged ship		Three Rivers	(United Kingdom of Great Britain and Ireland) Colony of Prince Edward Island	For private owner.
Unknown date	Detector	Wasp-class schooner	Fisher & Webster	North Yarmouth, Maine	United States	For United States Revenue Cutter Service.
Unknown date	Egyptian	Merchantman	Thomas Metcalf & Son	South Shields	United Kingdom	For John Fenwick & William Lilburn.
Unknown date	Elizabeth	Barque			(United Kingdom of Great Britain and Ireland) Colony of New Brunswick	For private owner.
Unknown date	Elizabeth	Brig		Great Yarmouth	United Kingdom	For private owner.
Unknown date	Elizabeth	Merchantman		Hylton	United Kingdom	For private owner.
Unknown date	Enchantress	Merchantman		Bristol	United Kingdom	For private owner.
Unknown date	Endeavour	Yacht			(England) Guernsey	For private owner.
Unknown date	Ganges	Merchantman	G. H. Boulby	Sunderland	United Kingdom	For private owner.
Unknown date	George Canning	Merchantman	John M. & William Gales	Sunderland	United Kingdom	For Thomas Young.
Unknown date	Glory	Snow	John M. & William Gales	Sunderland	United Kingdom	For John M. & William Gales
Unknown date	Governor Ready	Barque			(United Kingdom of Great Britain and Ireland) Colony of Prince Edward Island	For private owner.
Unknown date	Henry & Harriott	Snow		Monkwearmouth	United Kingdom	For private owner.
Unknown date	Humility	Brig	John M. & William Gales	Sunderland	United Kingdom	For John M. & William Gales.
Unknown date	Il Re Galantuomo	Ship of the line			Kingdom of Sardinia	For Royal Sardinian Navy.
Unknown date	Ipswich	Paddle steamer	William Bayley	Ipswich	United Kingdom	For Ipswich Steam Navigation Company.
Unknown date	Irlam	Merchantman		Liverpool	United Kingdom	For Barton, Irlam and Higginson.
Unknown date	Isabella	Merchantman		Shoreham-by-Sea	United Kingdom	For Gilmour & Richardson.
Unknown date	James	Brig	Philip Laing	Sunderland	United Kingdom	For private owner.
Unknown date	Kartería	Paddle Steamer	Daniel Brent	Rotherhithe	United Kingdom	For Hellenic Navy.
Unknown date	Kortenaer	Third rate			Netherlands	For Royal Netherlands Navy.
Unknown date	Lady Macnaghten	Barque			United Kingdom	For private owner.
Unknown date	Lord Gambier	Barque		Monkwearmouth	United Kingdom	For T. Bateson.
Unknown date	Mermaid	Brig		Bombay	India	For Bombay Pilot Service.
Unknown date	Mexico	Merchantman	Kirkbride & partners	Sunderland	United Kingdom	For R. Webster.
Unknown date	Neptunus	Third rate		Vlissingen	Netherlands	For Royal Netherlands Navy.
Unknown date	Ocean	Merchantman		Sunderland	United Kingdom	For private owner.
Unknown date	Pembroke	Merchantman	John M. & William Gales	Sunderland	United Kingdom	For Thomas Craig.
Unknown date	Perseverance	Merchantman	Philip Laing	Sunderland	United Kingdom	For private owner.
Unknown date	Pilgrim	Brig	Sprague & James	Medford, Massachusetts	United States	For Blake, Stanton & Hallett.
Unknown date	Rosella	Merchantman		Newcastle upon Tyne	United Kingdom	For Mr. Noble.
Unknown date	Sea Horse	Brig		Bombay	India	For Bombay Pilot Service.
Unknown date	Sir Francis N. Burton	Snow		Quebec	(United Kingdom of Great Britain and Ireland) Upper Canada	For private owner.
Unknown date	Spring Flower	Brigantine	Lumsden	Sunderland	United Kingdom	For private owner.
Unknown date	Talbot	Merchantman	Philip Laing	Sunderland	United Kingdom	For Mr. Rutherford.
Unknown date	Three Sisters	Sloop	William Bonker & James Vivian	Salcombe	United Kingdom	For John F. Anniss.
Unknown date	Triton	Sixth rate		Dunkirk	France	For Royal Netherlands Navy.
Unknown date	Tweed	Merchantman	Philip Laing	Sunderland	United Kingdom	For Philip Laing.
Unknown date	Utility	Merchantman	John M. & William Gales	Sunderland	United Kingdom	For John M. Gales.
Unknown date	Valiant	Snow		Sunderland	United Kingdom	For T. Walker & Co.
Unknown date	Wansbeck	Merchantman		Newcastle upon Tyne	United Kingdom	For private owner.
