= List of shipwrecks in August 1835 =

The list of shipwrecks in August 1835 includes ships sunk, foundered, wrecked, grounded or otherwise lost during August 1835.

== 1 August ==
List of shipwrecks: 1 August 1835
Ship	State	Description
Sarah	United States	The ship was driven ashore and wrecked at Green's Harbour, Newfoundland, British North America. She was on a voyage from New York to Halifax, Nova Scotia.

== 4 August ==
List of shipwrecks: 4 August 1835
Ship	State	Description
Lord Lynedoch	United Kingdom	The East Indiaman was wrecked on rocks north of Ouessant, Finistère, France. All on board, over 500 people, survived. She was on a voyage from London to Santander, Spain.
Neptunus	Sweden	The ship sprang a leak and was abandoned in the North Sea. Her crew were rescued. She was later taken in to Grimstad, Norway. Neptunus was on a voyage from Stockholm to Saint-Brieuc, Côtes-du-Nord, France.

== 5 August ==
List of shipwrecks: 5 August 1835
Ship	State	Description
Cœur de Lion	United Kingdom	The ship was beached at Macau, China. She was refloated on 5 September.
Donna Maria	Spain	The ship was lost at Macao.
Kent	United States	The barque was driven ashore at Canton, China.
Maria	Denmark	The brig was driven ashore and wrecked at Canton with the loss of ten or twelve of her crew. There were three survivors.
Matilda	United Kingdom	The brig was wrecked on the Reefs Guive, off Saint Domingo with the loss of three of her crew.
HMS Raleigh	Royal Navy	The Cruizer-class brig-sloop capsized in a typhoon 150 nautical miles (280 km) off Formosa (21°18′N 118°38′E) with the loss of two of her crew. She was subsequently righted and put into Macao for repairs.
Silas	United States	The ship was driven ashore in a typhoon at "Argien".
St. George	United Kingdom	The ship foundered at Macau. Her crew were rescued. She was later refloated.
Watkins	United Kingdom	The brig was wrecked at Canton.

== 7 August ==
List of shipwrecks: 7 August 1835
Ship	State	Description
Harmonie	France	The ship was driven ashore on Læsø, Denmark. She was on a voyage from Stettin, Prussia to Saint Malo, Ille-et-Vilaine.
Kloppenburg	Stettin	The ship was driven ashore on Læsø. Her crew were rescued. She was on a voyage from Stettin to Saint-Malo.
Missouri	United States	The ship was lost in the Bahamas. She was on a voyage from New Orleans, Louisiana to Marseille, Bouches-du-Rhône, France.

== 8 August ==
List of shipwrecks: 8 August 1835
Ship	State	Description
Flora	United Kingdom	The ship struck the pier and sank at Great Yarmouth, Norfolk. She was on a voyage from Newcastle upon Tyne, Northumberland to Great Yarmouth.
Hopewell	United Kingdom	The ship was wrecked on the Acaster Shoal, in the River Ouse, Yorkshire. Her crew were rescued.
Mangalore	United Kingdom	The brig was wrecked at "Lemwigh", on the coast of Jutland. Her crew were rescued. She was on a voyage from Liverpool, Lancashire to Saint Petersburg, Russia.
Margaretha Benjamin	Norway	The ship was wrecked at Thisted, Denmark. She was on a voyage from a French port to Christiansand.
Royal George	United Kingdom	The ship was wrecked on the coast of Jutland near "Robsnout". Her fifteen crew survived. She was on a voyage from Kristianstad, Sweden to Liverpool, Lancashire.

== 10 August ==
List of shipwrecks: 10 August 1835
Ship	State	Description
Diamond	United Kingdom	The ship was wrecked on Sylt, Duchy of Schleswig with the loss of a crew member. She was on a voyage from Matanzas, Cuba to Saint Petersburg, Russia.

== 11 August ==
List of shipwrecks: 11 August 1835
Ship	State	Description
Sarah Jane	United Kingdom	The schooner was driven ashore and wrecked at "Carnel", Pas-de-Calais, France. Her crew were rescued. She was on a voyage from Sierra Leone to London.

== 12 August ==
List of shipwrecks: 12 August 1835
Ship	State	Description
Esperanza	Spain	The ship departed from Veracruz, Republic of New Granada for Havana, Cuba and Gibraltar. No further trace, presumed foundered with the loss of all hands.
Lord Kinnaird	United Kingdom	The ship was wrecked at Arbroath, Forfarshire.
Mary	United Kingdom	The ship was driven ashore on Antigua. She was refloated on 27 August.
Paragon	United Kingdom	The ship was driven ashore on Antigua. She was refloated on 28 August.
Redwing	United Kingdom	The ship was run down and sunk in the Atlantic Ocean (47°N 47°W) by Oxford (United Kingdom). Her crew were rescued by Oxford.

== 13 August ==
List of shipwrecks: 13 August 1835
Ship	State	Description
Eagle	United Kingdom	The ship's crew mutinied and she was deliberately wrecked on the south coast of Cape Sable Island, Nova Scotia, British North America. Her crew survived, some of them making off in a schooner with £20,000 worth of specie. They reached Boston, Massachusetts, United States, where they were arrested. Eagle was on a voyage from Liverpool, Lancashire to New York, United States.

== 14 August ==
List of shipwrecks: 14 August 1835
Ship	State	Description
Henry	United States	The ship was wrecked in a hurricane at "Port-au-Plat".

== 15 August ==
List of shipwrecks: 15 August 1835
Ship	State	Description
Helen	United States	The ship was lost at Saint Kitts.

== 17 August ==
List of shipwrecks: 17 August 1835
Ship	State	Description
Friendship	(United Kingdom of Great Britain and Ireland) New South Wales	The whaler was lost off Norfolk Island. Her crew were rescued.
Jacmel	United Kingdom	The ship was abandoned in the Irish Sea off Ardglass, County Down. She was on a voyage from Ayr to Dundalk, County Louth.

== 19 August ==
List of shipwrecks: 19 August 1835
Ship	State	Description
Happy Jack	United Kingdom	The ship was driven ashore near Vera, Almería, Spain. She was on a voyage from London to Alicante, Spain.

== 22 August ==
List of shipwrecks: 22 August 1835
Ship	State	Description
Adolph Wilhelmina	Stettin	The brig was wrecked on the north east coast of Fair Isle, United Kingdom. Her eight crew survived. She was on a voyage from Stettin to Liverpool, Lancashire, United Kingdom.
Anne Caroline	(Russian Empire) Grand Duchy of Finland	The brig was wrecked on the east coast of Fair Isle. Her thirteen crew survived. She was on a voyage from Kokkola to Liverpool.
Sarah	United States	The schooner was destroyed by the explosion of her cargo of lime and saltpetre at Boston, Massachusetts.

== 23 August ==
List of shipwrecks: 23 August 1835
Ship	State	Description
Glenburnie	United Kingdom	Glenburnie collided with Pitt (United Kingdom), off Carlingford, County Louth, Ireland, and sank in the Irish Sea off the Calf of Man, Isle of Man. Four hours after she sank the steamship Solway (United Kingdom) providentially rescued the crew. Glenburnie, of Dundee, was on a voyage from Saint Petersburg to Liverpool.

== 24 August ==
List of shipwrecks: 24 August 1835
Ship	State	Description
Asia	United Kingdom	The ship was wrecked at Saugor with the loss of her captain. She was on a voyage from Calcutta, India to London.
Rapid	United Kingdom	The ship foundered in the Bristol Channel off Lundy Island, Devon. Her crew were rescued. She was on a voyage from Llanelli, Glamorgan to London.
Susan	United Kingdom	The ship was run down and sunk in the Bristol Channel off the Tusker Rock by Chester (United Kingdom). Her crew were rescued. She was on a voyage from Newport, Monmouthshire to Waterford.

== 25 August ==
List of shipwrecks: 25 August 1835
Ship	State	Description
Chance It	United Kingdom	The schooner was wrecked off Lossiemouth, Morayshire. Her crew were rescued. She was on a voyage from Newcastle upon Tyne, Northumberland to Campbeltown, Argyllshire.
Curlew	United Kingdom	The ship was wrecked on the east coast of Mauritius. Her crew were rescued.
Martin	United Kingdom	The sloop was wrecked on Islay, Inner Hebrides. She was on a voyage from Liverpool, Lancashire to Dundee, Forfarshire.
Michael Millar	United Kingdom	The ship was wrecked on the Brazil Bank, in Liverpool Bay. Her crew were rescued. She was on a voyage from Liverpool to Portmadoc, Caernarvonshire.
Wallace	United Kingdom	The ship was wrecked in the D'Entrecasteaux Channel. All on board were rescued. She was on her maiden voyage, from Leith, Lothian to Hobart Town, Van Diemen's Land.

== 26 August ==
List of shipwrecks: 26 August 1835
Ship	State	Description
Armenia	United Kingdom	The ship foundered in the English Channel off Portland Bill, Dorset. Her crew were rescued. She was on a voyage from Yarmouth, Isle of Wight to Gloucester.
Euphemia	Hamburg	The ship was wrecked on the Bondicar Rocks, in the North Sea off the coast of Northumberland, United Kingdom. She was on a voyage from Hamburg to the West Indies.
Sally	United Kingdom	The oyster boat was run down and sunk in the River Thames at Woolwich, Kent by the steamship Columbine. (United Kingdom) with the loss of one of her three crew. She was on a voyage from Queenborough, Kent to London.

== 27 August ==
List of shipwrecks: 27 August 1835
Ship	State	Description
Mary	United Kingdom	The ship was lost in the Davis Strait. Her crew were rescued.

== 28 August ==
List of shipwrecks: 28 August 1835
Ship	State	Description
Harlingen	Netherlands	The whaler was wrecked in the Davis Strait. Her 46 crew were rescued by Dundee (United Kingdom).
Nancy	(United Kingdom of Great Britain and Ireland) British North America	The schooner was lost near Catalina, Newfoundland with the loss of all but one of her crew.
Sylph	United Kingdom	The ship was lost off the Norwegian coast. She was on a voyage from Arkhangelsk, Russia to Arbroath, Forfarshire.

== 29 August ==
List of shipwrecks: 29 August 1835
Ship	State	Description
Severn	United Kingdom	The steamship was driven ashore at Hull, Yorkshire. She was on a voyage from Hull to Hamburg.

== Unknown date ==
List of shipwrecks: Unknown date 1835
Ship	State	Description
Brisk	(United Kingdom of Great Britain and Ireland) Antigua	The drogher was driven ashore and wrecked on Antigua.
Ellen	Hamburg	The ship was wrecked at Nevis before 29 August.
Julie Marguerite	(United Kingdom of Great Britain and Ireland) British North America	The ship was wrecked at Country Harbour, Nova Scotia before 10 August. She was on a voyage from Quebec City, Lower Canada to Halifax, Nova Scotia.
Maria	United Kingdom	The ship foundered in late August. She was on a voyage from Newport, Monmouthshire to Saint John's, Newfoundland, British North America.
Miriam and Jane	United Kingdom	The ship was lost at British Honduras before 1 September.
Seaflower	(United Kingdom of Great Britain and Ireland) British North America	The ship was wrecked on Prince Edward Island before 3 August. She was on a voyage from Quebec City to Saint John, New Brunswick.
Spitfire	United Kingdom	The cutter was wrecked at Cape Kili, on the Black Sea coast of the Ottoman Empire. Her crew were rescued.
