= List of shipwrecks in February 1832 =

The list of shipwrecks in February 1832 includes ships sunk, foundered, grounded, or otherwise lost during February 1832.

== 1 February ==
List of shipwrecks: 1 February 1832
Ship	State	Description
Altgiras	Spain	The schooner was captured off Matanzas, Cuba by a Colombian Navy cruiser. She was set afire and destroyed.
Ceres	France	The ship was wrecked at Stavanger, Norway. She was on a voyage from Stavanger to Sète, Hérault.
Felicity	United Kingdom	The ship struck the Clipera Rock, in the Irish Sea and foundered. Her crew were rescued. She was on a voyage from Flint to Holyhead, Anglesey.
Sally	United Kingdom	The ship foundered in the Atlantic Ocean between the Longships Lighthouse and the Runnel Stone. Her crew were rescued by Good Intent (United Kingdom). Sally was on a voyage from London to Bristol, Gloucestershire.

== 2 February ==
List of shipwrecks: 2 February 1832
Ship	State	Description
Cleopatra	United Kingdom	The ship was wrecked in Loch Indaal. Her crew were rescued. She was on a voyage from Sligo to London.
Portland	United Kingdom	The sloop foundered off the coast of Jamaica. Her crew were rescued.

== 3 February ==
List of shipwrecks: 3 February 1832
Ship	State	Description
Brothers	United Kingdom	The ship was wrecked at Dublin. Her crew were rescued. She was on a voyage from Dublin to Whitehaven, Cumberland.
Hibernia	United Kingdom	The ship was wrecked on the "East Breaker". She was on a voyage from Liverpool, Lancashire to Mobile, Alabama, United States.
Shark	United Kingdom	The ship was wrecked at Dublin. Her crew were rescued. She was on a voyage from Dublin to Wexford.

== 4 February ==
List of shipwrecks: 4 February 1832
Ship	State	Description
Albion	United Kingdom	The ship foundered in the Atlantic Ocean off the coast of County Donegal. She was on a voyage from the Clyde to Sligo.
Huntley	United Kingdom	The ship was wrecked in the Atlantic Ocean (49°50′N 21°00′W). She was abandoned on 7 February with the ultimate loss of three of her seventeen crew.
Sovereign	United Kingdom	The ship was in collision with a collier and sank in the River Thames at Greenhithe, Kent. She was later refloated and beached at Grays Thurrock, Essex.
Zetes	United Kingdom	The barque sprang a leak and was abandoned in the Gulf of Mexico off the coast of Louisiana, United States. Her crew survived.

== 5 February ==
List of shipwrecks: 5 February 1832
Ship	State	Description
Ann and Catherine	United Kingdom	The sloop foundered in the North Sea off Eastbarns, Lothian. Her crew were rescued. She was on a voyage from South Shields, County Durham to Dundee, Forfarshire.
Betsey	United Kingdom	The ship was driven ashore and sank at Cayenne, French Guiana. Her crew were rescued. She was on a voyage from Liverpool to Cayenne.
Crown	United Kingdom	The ship was driven ashore at Eastore Point, County Wexford with the loss of ten of her nineteen crew. She was on a voyage from Liverpool, Lancashire to Charleston, South Carolina, United States.
Dolphin	United Kingdom	The ship was destroyed by fire at Tralee, County Cork.
Elizabeth	United Kingdom	The ship was lost on the Caucassus Reef. She was on a voyage from Halifax, Nova Scotia, British North America to Jamaica.
Herald	United States	The ship was wrecked at "Ivica". Her crew were rescued.
St. Thomas	United Kingdom	The ship foundered in the North Sea with the loss of all hands.

== 6 February ==
List of shipwrecks: 6 February 1832
Ship	State	Description
Pirate	United Kingdom	The ship was driven ashore and wrecked at Aberdeen. She was on a voyage from Sunderland, County Durham to Banff, Aberdeenshire.

== 7 February ==
List of shipwrecks: 7 February 1832
Ship	State	Description
Endraght	Netherlands	The ship was lost in the Abaco Islands. Her crew were rescued. She was on a voyage from Amsterdam, North Holland to Havana, Cuba.
Samuel	United Kingdom	The ship was run down and sunk off Bridport, Dorset. She was on a voyage from Falmouth, Cornwall to London.

== 8 February ==
List of shipwrecks: 8 February 1832
Ship	State	Description
Eliza	United Kingdom	The ship was wrecked on the Horse Shoe Reef, off the coast of Antigua. All on board were rescued. She was on a voyage from Liverpool, Lancashire to Saint Thomas, Virgin Islands.

== 9 February ==
List of shipwrecks: 9 February 1832
Ship	State	Description
Friendsbury	United Kingdom	The whaler was wrecked on a coral reef in the Pacific Ocean (5°01′S 159°19′E) with the loss of 24 of her 35 crew.

== 10 February ==
List of shipwrecks: 10 February 1832
Ship	State	Description
Sophia	(United Kingdom of Great Britain and Ireland) Antigua	The schooner was wrecked on Anegada. She was on a voyage from Curaçao to Antigua.

== 12 February ==
List of shipwrecks: 12 February 1832
Ship	State	Description
Adventure	United Kingdom	The ship ran aground on the Gunfleet Sand, in the North Sea off the coast of Essex and sank. Her crew were rescued by Princess Royal (United Kingdom). She was on a voyage from Goole, Yorkshire to London.
Orb	United Kingdom	The ship was wrecked on the Whiting Sand, in the North Sea off the coast of Suffolk. Her crew were rescued.

== 14 February ==
List of shipwrecks: 14 February 1832
Ship	State	Description
Apparance	(Russian Empire) Grand Duchy of Finland	The ship ran aground on the Haisborough Sands, in the North Sea off the coast of Norfolk, United Kingdom and was consequently beached at Winterton-on-Sea. She was on a voyage from Jakobstadt to London, United Kingdom.

== 16 February ==
List of shipwrecks: 16 February 1832
Ship	State	Description
Lavinia	United States	The ship was wrecked on the Colorado Reef. Her crew were rescued. She was on a voyage from Veracruz, Mexico to New York.

== 18 February ==
List of shipwrecks: 18 February 1832
Ship	State	Description
Editha	United Kingdom	The ship was driven ashore on Terceira, Azores, Portugal. She was on a voyage from Quebec City, Lower Canada, British North America to Liverpool, Lancashire.
Naren	Portugal	The schooner was driven ashore and wrecked on Terceira.
Prudencia	Portugal	The brig was driven ashore and wrecked on Terceira.
Souvenir	United States	The schooner was driven ashore on Terceira.

== 19 February ==
List of shipwrecks: 19 February 1832
Ship	State	Description
Betsey	United Kingdom	The ship was in collision with a smack off Padstow, Cornwall and foundered. Her crew were rescued. She was on a voyage from London to Bristol, Gloucestershire.
Union	United Kingdom	The sloop sprang a leak and was beached near Mundesley, Norfolk. Her crew were rescued by the Mundesley Lifeboat. She was on a voyage from Hull, Yorkshire to Great Yarmouth, Norfolk.
Venus	United Kingdom	The ship was wrecked at "Uaber". Her crew were rescued. She was on a voyage from Söderhamn, Sweden to a British port.

== 20 February ==
List of shipwrecks: 20 February 1832
Ship	State	Description
Batavier	Netherlands	The steamship was driven ashore at Reculver, Kent, United Kingdom. She was on a voyage from Rotterdam, South Holland to London, United Kingdom.

== 21 February ==
List of shipwrecks: 21 February 1832
Ship	State	Description
Agnes	United Kingdom	The ship was lost off Itamaracá, Brazil. She was on a voyage from Liverpool, Lancashire to Pernambuco, Brazil.

== 22 February ==
List of shipwrecks: 22 February 1832
Ship	State	Description
Morning Star	United Kingdom	The ship was driven out to sea from Madeira, Portugal. she did not return.
Sabeto	Ottoman Empire	The ship was driven ashore and wrecked at Beirut.
Vigilancia	Brazil	The schooner was driven ashore and wrecked at Madeira.

== 24 February ==
List of shipwrecks: 24 February 1832
Ship	State	Description
Eliza	United Kingdom	The ship foundered in the Atlantic Ocean whilst bound for Havana, Cuba. Three of her crew were subsequently rescued by Treaty (United States).

== 25 February ==
List of shipwrecks: 25 February 1832
Ship	State	Description
Venus	Sweden	The ship was wrecked at Xàbia, Spain. Her crew were rescued. She was on a voyage from Söderhamn to Alicante, Spain.

== 26 February ==
List of shipwrecks: 26 February 1832
Ship	State	Description
Mercure	France	The ship sprang a leak and was beached at Bayonne, Gironde.

== 29 February ==
List of shipwrecks: 29 February 1832
Ship	State	Description
Caledonia		The ship was scuttled at Davi, near Tofua, Tonga. She had been taken over by seven convicts whilst at anchor at Moreton Bay, Queensland in December 1831.

== Unknown date ==
List of shipwrecks: Unknown date 1832
Ship	State	Description
Auguste	France	The ship was wrecked near Tunis before 22 February. She was on a voyage from Algiers, Algeria to Marseille, Bouches-du-Rhône.
General Putnam	United States	The ship was driven ashore at Barnegat, New Jersey and broke in two. She was on a voyage from Liverpool, Lancashire, United Kingdom to New York.
Madeira Paket	(United Kingdom of Great Britain and Ireland) New South Wales	The ship was wrecked on the Brampton Shoal. At least thirteen of her crew survived.
Phœnix	United Kingdom	The ship foundered whilst on a voyage from Kalmar, Sweden to Sète, Hérault, France.
San Christ del Grao	Spain	The ship was driven ashore at "Nouvelle", France. She was on a voyage from Valencia to Marseille, Bouches-du-Rhône, France.
Sarah and Sophia	(United Kingdom of Great Britain and Ireland) British North America	The drogher was wrecked on Cape Sable Island, Nova Scotia.
William Little	United Kingdom	The crew mutinied and murdered her captain. The ship was cubseqently scuttled off Fanning Island.
