= List of shipwrecks in March 1828 =

The list of shipwrecks in March 1828 includes some ships sunk, foundered, grounded, or otherwise lost during March 1828.

== 4 March ==
List of shipwrecks: 4 March 1828
Ship	State	Description
Finchett	United Kingdom	The brig ran aground in the River Mersey. She refloated herself the next day but consequently foundered. Her crew were rescued. She was on a voyage from Savannah, Georgia, United States to Liverpool, Lancashire.
Friends	United Kingdom	The ship was wrecked on Dragør, Denmark. She was on a voyage from Memel, Prussia to Montrose, Forfarshire.

== 5 March ==
List of shipwrecks: 5 March 1828
Ship	State	Description
Ann and Elizabeth	United Kingdom	The ship was driven ashore and wrecked at Katwijk, North Holland, Netherlands. Her crew were rescued. She was on a voyage from Newcastle upon Tyne, Northumberland to Bremen.
Commerce	United Kingdom	The brig was driven ashore and wrecked at Mockbeggar, Cheshire. She was on a voyage from Macao to Liverpool, Lancashire.
Daniel IV	United Kingdom	The ship was destroyed by fire whilst on a voyage from Otaheite to London.
Elizabeth and Sarah	United Kingdom	The collier was driven ashore at Whitstable, Kent.
Enigheden	(Sweden) Norway	The ship foundered in the North Sea. Her crew were rescued. She was on a voyage from Bergen to Barcelona, Spain.
Euphemia	United Kingdom	The ship was driven ashore and wrecked at Sandhale, Lincolnshire with the loss of all hands.
Fame	United Kingdom	The sloop was driven ashore at Liverpool.
Laconia	United States	The ship foundered in the North Sea off Hook of Holland, South Holland, Netherlands with the loss of all hands. She was on a voyage from Charleston, South Carolina to Hamburg.
Liberty's Increase	United Kingdom	The ship was driven ashore near Scarborough, Yorkshire. She was on a voyage from Stockton on Tees to Sunderland, County Durham. Liberty's Increase became a total wreck the next day.
Young Man's Endeavour	United Kingdom	The ship was driven ashore and wrecked at Saltfleet, Lincolnshire. Her crew were rescued. She was on a voyage from Wisbech, Cambridgeshire to Hull, Yorkshire.

== 6 March ==
List of shipwrecks: 6 March 1828
Ship	State	Description
George	United Kingdom	The brigantine ran aground and was wrecked at Swansea, Glamorgan. Her crew were rescued.
George Canning	United Kingdom	The ship was wrecked at Mauritius with the loss of eighteen of her 40 crew. She was on a voyage from Bengal, India to Mauritius.
Industry	United Kingdom	The ship ran aground on the Heaps Sand, in the North Sea off the coast of Essex. She was refloated but consequently foundered. Her crew were rescued. Industry was on a voyage from Sunderland, County Durham to London.
Lalla Rookh	India	The ship was wrecked at Pondicherry. She was on a voyage from Madras to Penang, China.
Marmion	United Kingdom	The brig was driven ashore on Mauritius.

== 8 March ==
List of shipwrecks: 8 March 1828
Ship	State	Description
Clarence	United Kingdom	The ship was wrecked in the Scheldt near Terneuzen, Zeeland, Netherlands. She was on a voyage from Rio de Janeiro, Brazil to Antwerp, Netherlands

== 9 March ==
List of shipwrecks: 9 March 1828
Ship	State	Description
Emerald	United Kingdom	The ship sank at Beaumaris, Anglesey.
Mary	United Kingdom	The ship was wrecked near Ilfracombe, Devon. Her crew were rescued. She was on a voyage from Cork to Bristol, Gloucestershire.
Saltoun	United Kingdom	The ship was wrecked on the Scrub Rock, off the coast of Anguilla. There were four survivors. She was on a voyage from Dominica to London.

== 10 March ==
List of shipwrecks: 10 March 1828
Ship	State	Description
Venerable	United Kingdom	The brig was driven ashore and wrecked near Ballygreen, County Galway with the loss of all but her captain. She was on a voyage from Cork to Galway.

== 11 March ==
List of shipwrecks: 11 March 1828
Ship	State	Description
Charles Jamieson	United Kingdom	The ship struck a rock and was wrecked in the Cape Verde Islands, Portugal. All on board were rescued. She was on a voyage from London to the Cape of Good Hope.
Orpheus	United Kingdom	Lloyd's List reported that the merchant ship had arrived at Antwerp, Belgium, after running aground on the Van Warden Bank.
Venus	United Kingdom	The paddle steamer sprang a leak and foundered in the Irish Sea off "Courtoun", County Wexford with the loss of seven lives. She was on a voyage from Waterford to Dublin.

== 12 March ==
List of shipwrecks: 12 March 1828
Ship	State	Description
Rio	United Kingdom	The ship was wrecked near Pernambuco, Brazil.

== 14 March ==
List of shipwrecks: 14 March 1828
Ship	State	Description
Town of Liverpool	United Kingdom	The steamship ran aground and was wrecked in the River Suir. All on board were rescued. She was on a voyage from Waterford to Liverpool.

== 15 March ==
List of shipwrecks: 15 March 1828
Ship	State	Description
Jolly Bachelor	United Kingdom	The ship capsized at Eyemouth, Berwickshire.

== 18 March ==
List of shipwrecks: 18 March 1828
Ship	State	Description
Bee	United Kingdom	The ship was driven ashore and wrecked at Troon, Ayrshire.
Bonavista	United Kingdom	The brig was wrecked on the King Reef, in the Pacific Ocean. Her crew survived. She was on a voyage from Sydney, New South Wales to Mauritius.
Eliza Ann	United Kingdom	The sloop was driven ashore and wrecked on the coast of County Donegal with the loss of all hands.
Irishman	United Kingdom	The schooner was driven ashore at Killala, County Mayo. She was on a voyage from Carlisle, Cumberland to Ballina, County Mayo.
Mary Ann	United Kingdom	The ship was driven ashore in Strangford Lough. She was on a voyage from Strangford, County Down to Liverpool, Lancashire.
Mary Ann	United Kingdom	The sloop was driven ashore near the Black Rock, Ayrshire. Her crew were rescued. She was on a voyage from Ballyraine, County Donegal to Dublin.
Peter and Elizabeth	United Kingdom	The ship was driven ashore near Ravenglass, Cumberland. She was on a voyage from Liverpool to Killough, County Down.

== 19 March ==
List of shipwrecks: 19 March 1828
Ship	State	Description
Nelly and Margaret	United Kingdom	The ship was driven ashore and wrecked at Kirkcudbright. Her crew survived.
Speedwell	United Kingdom	The ship was driven ashore and wrecked at Lamlash, Isle of Arran. Her crew were rescued.
Tyne	United Kingdom	The ship was destroyed by fire at Bombay, India.

== 20 March ==
List of shipwrecks: 20 March 1828
Ship	State	Description
Sarah Morrell	United States	The ship was driven ashore and wrecked at Broadhaven Bay, County Mayo, United Kingdom. She was on a voyage from New Orleans, Louisiana to Liverpool, Lancashire, United Kingdom.
William	United Kingdom	The schooner ship was wrecked on the Banjaard Sand, in the North Sea off Schouwen-Duiveland, South Holland. Netherlands. She was on a voyage from Newcastle upon Tyne, Northumberland to Rotterdam, South Holland.

== 21 March ==
List of shipwrecks: 21 March 1828
Ship	State	Description
Mary	United Kingdom	The ship was wrecked on the Shipwash Sand, in the North Sea off the coast of Suffolk. Her crew were rescued.
Saracen	United Kingdom	The ship was wrecked on the coast of Chile. All on board were rescued. She was on a voyage from New South Wales to Valparaíso, Chile.
HMS Union	Royal Navy	The schooner was wrecked near Nassau, Bahamas with the loss of seven of her crew.

== 23 March ==
List of shipwrecks: 23 March 1828
Ship	State	Description
Arrow	United Kingdom	The ship foundered in the Irish Sea off Small Ord Point, Caernarfonshire with the loss of one of her three crew. Survivors were rescued by Venus (United Kingdom).
James	United Kingdom	The ship was wrecked on the Garraway Rock, in the Irish Sea off Ballywalter, County Down. She was on a voyage from Glasgow, Renfrewshire to the West Indies.

== 26 March ==
List of shipwrecks: 26 March 1828
Ship	State	Description
Eliza	United Kingdom	The sloop was driven ashore at Peterhead, Aberdeenshire, where she became a wreck the next day. She was on a voyage from Aberdeen to Inverness.

== 28 March ==
List of shipwrecks: 28 March 1828
Ship	State	Description
Navarino	United Kingdom	The ship was wrecked at São Miguel, Azores, Portugal. Her crew were rescued.

== 30 March ==
List of shipwrecks: 30 March 1828
Ship	State	Description
Air	United Kingdom	The ship was driven ashore at Lossiemouth, Morayshire. Her crew were rescued. She was on a voyage from Sunderland, County Durham to Liverpool, Lancashire.

== Unknown date ==
List of shipwrecks: Unknown date in March 1828
Ship	State	Description
Britannia	United Kingdom	The ship was wrecked in Praya Bay, Madeira, Portugal.
Hannah	United Kingdom	The ship foundered in the North Sea with the loss of all hands. She was on a voyage from Sunderland, County Durham to Hamburg.
Hortense	France	The schooner foundered at Cádiz, Spain before 7 March.
London	United Kingdom	The ship struck a rock and foundered in the Atlantic Ocean off Caldas da Rainha, Portugal with the loss of all but three of her crew. She was on a voyage from London to Lisbon, Portugal.
