= Glenburnie (ship) =

Several ships have been named Glenburnie:

- Glenburnie (1825 ship) was a schooner launched at Aberdeen. She traded with the West Indies and Russia. A ship ran into her in the Irish Sea on 23 August 1835 and she sank within hours.
- Glenburnie (1840 ship) was launched in Prince Edward Island. She first appeared in Lloyd's Register (LR) in 1841. She traded between England and Quebec and was lost in 1843.
- Glenburnie (1864 ship), of 1,172 GRT, was launched by Union Shipbuilding, Glasgow. In 1865 her name changed to British Viceroy. In August 1875 she collided with another vessel in the Hooghly River at Calcutta and sank.
- Glenburnie (1923 ship), of 1,905 GRT, was a single-screw, steel, Great Lakes bulk carrier, launched by Barclay, Curie, of Glasgow. In 1926 her name changed to Waterloo. She was at the Dunkirk evacuation. In July 1940 the German Luftwaffe bombed and sank her as she was sailing from London for Tyne in ballast.
