= List of shipwrecks in March 1841 =

The list of shipwrecks in March 1841 includes ships sunk, foundered, wrecked, grounded, or otherwise lost during March 1841.

== 1 March ==
List of shipwrecks: 1 March 1841
Ship	State	Description
Louisa Maria	Hamburg	The ship was wrecked off Anjer, Netherlands East Indies. Her crew were rescued. She was on a voyage from Hamburg to Batavia, Netherlands East Indies.
Mary Hamilton	United Kingdom	The ship was driven ashore at the entrance to Lough Swilly. She was on a voyage from Donegal to Liverpool, Lancashire.

== 2 March ==
List of shipwrecks: 2 March 1841
Ship	State	Description
Flamer	United Kingdom	The ship was driven ashore and wrecked at Noirmont Point, Jersey, Channel Islands. She was on a voyage from Jersey to Guernsey, Channel Islands and Liverpool, Lancashire.
Harriet	United Kingdom	The ship was driven ashore at the Leasowe Lighthouse, Cheshire.

== 3 March ==
List of shipwrecks: 3 March 1841
Ship	State	Description
Caspian	United States	The ship was driven ashore in the Mississippi River downstream of New Orleans, Louisiana.
Swan	United Kingdom	The ship was abandoned off Barbuda. Her crew were rescued. She was on a voyage from Philadelphia, Pennsylvania, United States to Gibraltar.

== 4 March ==
List of shipwrecks: 4 March 1841
Ship	State	Description
Union	France	The ship was wrecked on the Hafoie Rock, off Aux Cayes, Haiti. She was on a voyage from Aux Cayes to Marseille, Bouches-du-Rhône.

== 5 March ==
List of shipwrecks: 5 March 1841
Ship	State	Description
Brilliant	United Kingdom	The smack was driven ashore and sank at Watergate, Cornwall with the loss of all five of her crew. She was on a voyage from Boscastle to Penzance.
Mary	United Kingdom	The brig was wrecked at Newhaven, Sussex. She was on a voyage from Alderney, Channel Islands to London.
Una	United States	The ship was wrecked at Veracruz, Mexico with the loss of a crew member. She was on a voyage from Veracruz to New York.
William	United Kingdom	The barge sank in the Bristol Channel. She was on a voyage from Bristol, Gloucestershire to Gloucester.

== 7 March ==
List of shipwrecks: 7 March 1841
Ship	State	Description
Europa	Bremen	The ship ran aground in the Weser and was abandoned by her crew. She floated off but grounded again on the Wurstener Wat. Europa was on a voyage from Baltimore, Maryland, United States to Bremen. Europa was refloated on 10 March and taken into Bremen.
Nicholas	United Kingdom	The ship was wrecked on Scharhörn with the loss of a crew member. Survivors were rescued by the steamship Neptune (flag unknown). Nicholas was on a voyage from Newcastle upon Tyne, Northumberland to Hamburg.

== 8 March ==
List of shipwrecks: 8 March 1841
Ship	State	Description
Beehive	United Kingdom	The sloop was driven ashore and damaged at Lindisfarne, Northumberland. She was on a voyage from Newcastle upon Tyne, Northumberland to Peterhead, Aberdeenshire. Beehive was refloated on 19 March with assistance from a steamship and towed into Berwick upon Tweed for repairs.
George Washington	Sweden	The ship was run aground and was wrecked at "Fultning" or "Tipelring", Denmark. She was on a voyage from Gothenburg to Antwerp, Belgium.
Mary Ann	United Kingdom	The ship ran ashore in Carnarvon Bay. She was on a voyage from Cork to Liverpool, Lancashire. Mary Ann was refloated the next day and taken into Holyhead, Anglesey.
New Volunteer	United Kingdom	The ship was driven ashore at The Mumbles, Glamorgan. She was on a voyage from Newport, Monmouthshire to Baltimore, Maryland, United States. She was refloated and taken into Swansea, Glamorgan.
Rosa	United Kingdom	The ship was struck a submerged object and foundered east of "Cepede Gatt". Her crew were rescued. She was on a voyage from Plymouth, Devon to Malta.
Uranus	Hamburg	The ship ran aground on the Sand Reef. She was on a voyage from Rio de Janeiro, Brazil to Hamburg.

== 9 March ==
List of shipwrecks: 9 March 1841
Ship	State	Description
Elizabeth	United Kingdom	The ship ran aground on Scroby Sands, Norfolk. She was on a voyage from Caernarfon to Stockton-on-Tees, County Durham. Elizabeth was refloated the next day.
Hirondelle	United Kingdom	The steamship was in collision with another vessel and sank in the River Ouse at Howden, Yorkshire. All on board were rescued. She was on a voyage from Hull to Selby.
Leander	United Kingdom	The ship ran aground in Torbay. She was on a voyage from Newcastle upon Tyne, Northumberland to Alexandria, Egypt.
Lord Ernest	United Kingdom	The ship ran aground on the Maplin Sand, in the North Sea off the coast of Essex. She was on a voyage from Seaham, County Durham to London. Lord Ernest was refloated and taken into Sheerness, Kent.
Zephyr	France	The ship was wrecked on the Warrington Reef, off Antigua. Her crew were rescued.

== 10 March ==
List of shipwrecks: 10 March 1841
Ship	State	Description
Aurore	France	The ship ran aground on the Brake Sand, in the North Sea off the coast of Essex, United Kingdom. She was on a voyage from Sunderland, County Durham to Bordeaux, Gironde.
Ceres	United Kingdom	The ship was driven ashore and damaged by ice at Gothenburg, Sweden. She was on a voyage from Sunderland to Malmö, Sweden. She was later refloated.
Tiger	United Kingdom	The ship was driven ashore and wrecked at Helford, Cornwall. She was on a voyage from Stockton-on-Tees, County Durham to Bordeaux.

== 12 March ==
List of shipwrecks: 12 March 1841
Ship	State	Description
Abbott	United Kingdom	The schooner collided with the barque Royal Saxon (United Kingdom) and foundered off Ballycotton, County Cork. Her crew were rescued. She was on a voyage from Swansea, Glamorgan to Cork.
Lucy	United Kingdom	The ship was wrecked whilst on a voyage from Portsmouth, Hampshire to Guernsey, Channel Islands. All on board were rescued.
Matthew Bell	United Kingdom	The ship ran ashore on Rathlin Island, County Donegal. She was on a voyage from New Orleans, Louisiana, United States to Liverpool, Lancashire.
Osprey	United States	The ship was driven ashore at Ramsgate, Kent, United Kingdom. She was on a voyage from the James River to Bremen. Osprey was refloated the next day and proceeded on her voyage.
Phœbe	United Kingdom	The ship struck rocks off the east coast of Rathlin Island, County Antrim. She was on a voyage from Liverpool, Lancashire to Londonderry.
President	United Kingdom	During a voyage from New York City, United States, to Liverpool, England, the paddle steamer was last sighted on this date between Nantucket Shoals and Georges Bank during a gale. She subsequently disappeared in the North Atlantic Ocean with the loss of all 136 people on board, presumably having sunk during the storm.
Shannon	United Kingdom	The ship was driven ashore near Donaghadee, County Down. She was on a voyage from Cardiff, Glamorgan to Belfast, County Antrim. Shannon was refloated and resumed her voyage.
Two Sisters	United Kingdom	The ship was driven ashore at Arklow, County Wicklow. She was on a voyage from London to Dublin. Two Sisters was refloated on 14 March and taken into Dublin.

== 13 March ==
List of shipwrecks: 13 March 1841
Ship	State	Description
Charles	(United Kingdom of Great Britain and Ireland) British North America	The ship was wrecked at Keel's Head, Newfoundland. Her crew were rescued.
Cressinus	United Kingdom	The ship ran aground off Hemsby, Norfolk. She was on a voyage from Middlesbrough, Yorkshire to London. Cressinus was refloated and resumed her voyage.
Dunnottar Castle	United Kingdom	The ship ran aground off Cardiff, Glamorgan. She was on a voyage from Newport, Monmouthshire to London.
Enterprize	United Kingdom	The ship ran ashore at Groomsport, County Down. She was on a voyage from Troon, Ayrshire to Belfast, County Antrim. Enterprize was refloated.
Exchange	United Kingdom	The ship ran aground off Aldeburgh, Suffolk. She was on a voyage from Bridlington, Yorkshire to London. She was refloated the next day with assistance from HMRC Desmond ( Board of Customs).
Harriet	United Kingdom	The ship ran aground on the Spyker Plaat, in the North Sea off the coast of Zeeland, Netherlands. She was on a voyage from Antwerp, Belgium to Liverpool, Lancashire. She was refloated and taken into Vlissingen, Zeeland.
Nancy	United Kingdom	The ship ran aground on the Long Rock of Ballywater. She was on a voyage from Liverpool to Tobermory, Mull.
Sotthoff	Hamburg	The ship ran aground near Algeciras, Spain. She was on a voyage from Cette, Hérault, France to Hamburg. Sotthoff was refloated the next day.
Thistle	United Kingdom	The ship ran aground and was damaged on the Herd Sand, in the North Sea off the coast of County Durham. She was on a voyage from Montrose, Forfarshire to South Shields, County Durham. Thistle was refloated with assistance from Conquest (United Kingdom) and towed into South Shields.
Two Brothers	United Kingdom	The ship was run aground off the Isle of Grain, Kent. She was on a voyage from Harwich, Essex to London. She was refloated on 20 March.
Weltreveden	Netherlands	The ship ran aground on the Pampas, in the North Sea off the coast of Zeeland. She was on a voyage from Batavia, Netherlands East Indies to Hellevoetsluis, Zeeland. Westreveden was refloated the next day.

== 14 March ==
List of shipwrecks: 14 March 1841
Ship	State	Description
Bernard	Netherlands	The ship ran aground on the Newcombe Sand, in the North Sea off the coast of Norfolk, United Kingdom. She was on a voyage from Rotterdam, South Holland to Batavia, Netherlands East Indies. She was refloated and resumed her voyage.
Earl Percy	United Kingdom	The ship was destroyed by fire at Maranhão, Empire of Brazil.
Jonge Hero	Netherlands	The ship ran aground on the Goodwin Sands, Kent, United Kingdom. She was on a voyage from Rotterdam, South Holland to Newhaven, Sussex, United Kingdom. Jong Hero was refloated and taken into Ramsgate, Kent.
Margaret Brown	United Kingdom	The ship was wrecked on the east coast of Rathlin Island, County Antrim. She was on a voyage from Irvine, Ayrshire to Ballina, County Mayo.
Mary Jane	United Kingdom	The ship ran aground on the Meers Rocks, off the coast of Cornwall. She was on a voyage from Poole, Dorset to Liverpool, Lancashire. Mary Jane was refloated and taken into Coverack, Cornwall.
Ocean	United Kingdom	The ship was driven ashore 10 nautical miles (19 km) east of Calais, France. She was on a voyage from London to Dunkirk, Nord, France.
Orestes	United Kingdom	The ship was driven ashore in Table Bay. She was on a voyage from London to Sydney, New South Wales. Orestes was refloated on 18 March.
Queen Victoria	United Kingdom	The ship ran aground off the coast of Suffolk. She was on a voyage from South Shields, County Durham to London. She was refloated and resumed her voyage.
Tiger	United Kingdom	The ship ran ashore at the Point of Ayre, Isle of Man. She was on a voyage from Liverpool to Glasgow, Renfrewshire.
Vigilant	United Kingdom	The ship was run aground on the Bondicar Rocks, off the coast of Northumberland. She was refloated and put into the River Tyne in a leaky condition.

== 15 March ==
List of shipwrecks: 15 March 1841
Ship	State	Description
Ann	United Kingdom	The schooner was severely damaged by fire at Rotherhithe, Surrey.
Don Pedro	United Kingdom	The ship was driven ashore near St Alban's Head, Dorset. She was on a voyage from Honfleur, Calvados, France to Belfast, County Antrim.
Enterprise	United Kingdom	The ship ran aground at Donaghadee, County Down. She was refloated.
Friends of Liberty	United Kingdom	The schooner was wrecked in Rocky Bay, County Cork. Her crew were rescued.
Good Intent	United Kingdom	The ship ran ashore at Ballyferris Point, County Down. She was refloated.
Matthew Bell	United Kingdom	The ship was driven ashore on Rathlin Island, County Antrim.
Pictou	(United Kingdom of Great Britain and Ireland) British North America	The ship was wrecked at Portugal Cove, Newfoundland. Her crew were rescued. She was on a voyage from Halifax, Nova Scotia to Saint John, New Brunswick.

== 16 March ==
List of shipwrecks: 16 March 1841
Ship	State	Description
Albert	France	The ship was wrecked on the Mew Stone. She was on a voyage from Saint-Valery-sur-Somme to Plymouth, Devon, United Kingdom.
Jajaden or Najada	(Russian Empire) Grand Duchy of Finland	The ship ran aground on the Swinebottoms Reef, off Helsingør, Denmark. She was on a voyage from Newcastle upon Tyne to Copenhagen, Denmark. The vessel was refloated on 30 March.
Mary	United Kingdom	The sloop was wrecked on the Carr Rock, in the Firth of Forth. Her crew were rescued. She was on a voyage from Newcastle upon Tyne, Northumberland to Perth, Scotland.
Syren	United Kingdom	The ship was severely damaged by fire at Sunderland, County Durham.
Victory	(United Kingdom of Great Britain and Ireland) British North America	The ship was abandoned in the Atlantic Ocean. Her four crew were rescued by Alexander Toussin (France). Victory was on a voyage from Halifax, Nova Scotia to Antigua.

== 17 March ==
List of shipwrecks: 17 March 1841
Ship	State	Description
Glasgow Merchant	United Kingdom	The schooner was wrecked on the Hauxley Rocks, Northumberland. She was on a voyage from Rotterdam, South Holland, Netherlands to Glasgow, Renfrewshire.
Rising Sun	United Kingdom	The ship was wrecked near "Carabourtron", on the coast of the Black Sea with the loss of a crew member.

== 18 March ==
List of shipwrecks: 18 March 1841
Ship	State	Description
Globe	United States	The ship foundered off the Bahamas. All on board were rescued. She was on a voyage from Bath, Maine to New York.
Rinaldo	United Kingdom	The brig was lost off the Bahamas. Her crew were rescued. She was on a voyage from Gloucester to New York.
Thompson	United Kingdom	The ship was driven ashore at Portsmouth, Hampshire. She was on a voyage from Portsmouth to Seaham, County Durham.

== 19 March ==
List of shipwrecks: 19 March 1841
Ship	State	Description
Claudine	France	The ship was wrecked on the Conch Reef. She was on a voyage from Veracruz, Mexico to Havre de Grâce, Seine-Inférieure.
Forth	United Kingdom	The brig ran aground on the Pan Sand, off the coast of Kent.
Perseverance	France	The whaler was wrecked on the "Île Arboque", in the "Bay of Sea Dogs", New Holland. All on board survived the shipwreck; they set off two months later in four boats. Those surviving in the boat commanded by the third mate were rescued after 27 days by Eliza (United Kingdom), one person having died previously.

== 20 March ==
List of shipwrecks: 20 March 1841
Ship	State	Description
Allegro	United Kingdom	The ship was wrecked near Boyne, Haiti. Her crew were rescued. She was on a voyage from Saint Andrews, New Brunswick, British North America to Jamaica.
Donnington	United Kingdom	The ship ran aground on the Gunfleet Sand, in the North Sea off the coast of Essex. She was refloated and taken into Rochester, Kent.
Louisa and Rachael	United Kingdom	The ship was driven ashore at Steel Point, Cornwall. She floated off and sank. Her crew were rescued.

== 22 March ==
List of shipwrecks: 22 March 1841
Ship	State	Description
Eliza	United Kingdom	The ship departed from San Domingo for Liverpool, Lancashire. No further trace, presumed foundered with the loss of all hands.
Mary Ann Belton	United Kingdom	The schooner was wrecked at São Miguel Island, Azores. Her crew were rescued.
Mary Stuart	United Kingdom	The ship was abandoned off Penzance, Cornwall. Six would-be rescuers were drowned when their boat was swamped. Her crew were subsequently rescued by HMRC Sylva ( Board of Customs).
Swift	United Kingdom	The ship was in collision with Perseverance (United Kingdom) and was beached on the Cork Sand, in the North Sea off the coast of Essex. Perseverance was towed into Harwich, Essex in a sinking condition.

== 23 March ==
List of shipwrecks: 23 March 1841
Ship	State	Description
Falcon	United Kingdom	The ship was driven ashore and wrecked at Thisted, Denmark. She was on a voyage from Messina, Sicily to Saint Petersburg, Russia.
Myrtle	(United Kingdom of Great Britain and Ireland) British North America	The ship was driven ashore crewless on Faial Island, Azores.
Prince of Waterloo	United Kingdom	The ship ran aground at Savannah, Georgia, United States. She was on a voyage from Liverpool, Lancashire to Savannah. Prince of Waterloo was refloated and taken into Savannah in a leaky condition.

== 25 March ==
List of shipwrecks: 25 March 1841
Ship	State	Description
Napoleon	United Kingdom	The ship was driven ashore on Sand Island, Alabama, United States. She was on a voyage from Mobile, Alabama to Liverpool, Lancashire.

== 26 March ==
List of shipwrecks: 26 March 1841
Ship	State	Description
Calista	United Kingdom	The ship sprang a leak and was abandoned in the Atlantic Ocean off the coast of Sierra Leone. She was on a voyage from Sierra Leone to London. Her crew reboarded her the next day; she ran aground on the Scarles Bank on 28 March.
Manchester	United Kingdom	The ship ran aground on the Carysfort Reef. She was on a voyage from Havre de Grâce, Seine-Inférieure, France to New Orleans, Louisiana.
Xanthus	United Kingdom	The ship was wrecked on the Stag Rocks, off the coast of Cornwall. She was on a voyage from London to Liverpool, Lancashire.

== 27 March ==
List of shipwrecks: 27 March 1841
Ship	State	Description
Albion	United Kingdom	The ship was driven ashore at Dundee, Forfarshire. She was on a voyage from Newcastle upon Tyne, Northumberland to Perth. She was refloated and taken into Dundee.
Betsey	United Kingdom	The ship departed from Stockton-on-Tees, County Durham for Scarborough, Yorkshire or Bridlington, Yorkshire. No further trace, presumed foundered with the loss of all hands.
Heureuse Julienne	France	The ship was wrecked at Loc'h, Finistère with the loss of three of her crew.

== 28 March ==
List of shipwrecks: 28 March 1841
Ship	State	Description
Harvest Home	United Kingdom	The ship ran ashore at Porth Neigwl, Caernarfonshire. She was on a voyage from Saint John, New Brunswick, British North America to Liverpool, Lancashire. She was refloated on 8 April and taken into St. Tudwal's Islands.

== 30 March ==
List of shipwrecks: 30 March 1841
Ship	State	Description
Lion	United Kingdom	The ship was wrecked on Glover's Reef, in the Atlantic Ocean 60 nautical miles (110 km) off Belize City, British Honduras. Her crew were rescued. She was on a voyage from the Clyde to British Honduras.

== 31 March ==
List of shipwrecks: 31 March 1841
Ship	State	Description
Britannia	United Kingdom	The schooner was driven onto the Treverthick Rocks, Cornwall. Her seven crew were rescued by the Coast Guard using rocket apparatus. She was on a voyage from Llanelly, Glamorgan to Hayle, Cornwall. Britannia had broken up by 6 April .
Lady Sondes	United Kingdom	The ship was driven ashore at Swinemünde, Prussia. She was on a voyage from Liverpool, Lancashire to Swinemünde. Lady Sondes was later refloated.
Strathmore	United Kingdom	The brig was driven ashore and wrecked in Carnarvon Bay. All on board were rescued. She was on a voyage from Bahia, Brazil to Liverpool. Strathmore was refloated on 27 May and taken into Pwllheli, Caernarfonshire.
Swallow	United Kingdom	The ship ran aground on the Shoeburyness Knock Sande in the North Sea off the coast of Essex. She was on a voyage from Portland, Dorset to London. Swallow was refloated and taken into Sheerness, Kent.
Traveller	United Kingdom	The ship was wrecked on the Gunfleet Sand, in the North Sea off the coast of Essex. Her crew were rescued. She was on a voyage from Stockton-on-Tees, County Durham to Rochester, Kent.

== Unknown date ==
List of shipwrecks: Unknown date in March 1841
Ship	State	Description
Agenoria	United Kingdom	The ship was holed by her anchor and sank at South Shields, County Durham in late March. She was on a voyage from South Shields to Dunkirk, Nord, France. Agenoria was refloated on 3 April and beached.
Bonne Mere	France	The ship was abandoned in the Atlantic Ocean. All on board were rescued by Helen Mar (United Kingdom). Bonne Mere was on a voyage from Saint John, New Brunswick, British North America to Cork, United Kingdom.
Buoyant	United Kingdom	The ship ran aground in the Dardanelles. She had been refloated by 17 March.
Chabor	United Kingdom	The ship foundered in a typhoon in the Palawang Passage.
Dryade	United Kingdom	The ship departed from Mauritius for London on 24 February. Initially reported as no further trace, presumed foundered with the loss of all hands. She had developed a leak on 28 February and soon after crew and passengers abandoned her at sea. They reached Madagascar in her boats.
Elizabeth	United Kingdom	The ship was driven ashore on Alderney, Channel Islands. She was on a voyage from London to Sydney, New South Wales. Elizabeth was refloated and put into Portsmouth, Hampshire, where she arrived on 16 March.
Elizabeth	Netherlands	The ship foundered in a typhoon in the Palawang Passage with the loss of all hands.
Havannah	United Kingdom	The ship foundered in the Atlantic Ocean. Her crew were rescued.
Hayle	United Kingdom	The ship was driven ashore at Wicklow. She was on a voyage from Runcorn, Cheshire to Wicklow. Hayle was refloated on 5 March and taken into Wicklow.
Ionia	United Kingdom	The ship ran aground in the Dardanelles. She was refloated and taken into Buscia Bay.
Jeune Annette	France	The ship was abandoned in the English Channel. She was on a voyage from Bordeaux, Gironde to Rouen, Seine-Inférieure. Jeune Annette was taken into Guernsey, Channel Islands by the steamship Transit (United Kingdom). She arrived on 15 March.
Lady Grant	United Kingdom	The ship foundered in a typhoon in the Palawang Passage with the loss of all hands.
Leo	United Kingdom	The brig foundered in the Atlantic Ocean.
Magicienne	France	The barque was driven ashore in a typhoon in the Palawang Passage. Her crew were rescued.
Mary Ann	United Kingdom	The ship capsized in the Atlantic Ocean 200 nautical miles (370 km) west of the Azores between 22 and 25 March. Her crew were rescued.
Moses	United Kingdom	The ship ran aground on the Blacktail Bank, in the North Sea off the coast of Essex. She was refloated with assistance from Britannia, New Dart and Perseverance (all United Kingdom).
Napoleon	United Kingdom	The ship was wrecked on Sand Island, Alabama, United States before 22 March. She was on a voyage from Liverpool, Lancashire to Mobile, Alabama.
Persevere	United Kingdom	The ship ran aground on the Cork Sand, in the North Sea off the coast of Essex. She was refloated with assistance from Agenoria, Aurora's Increase and Romney (all United Kingdom) and taken into Harwich.
Prince Cobourg	United Kingdom	The brig sprang a leak and was abandoned in the Atlantic Ocean before 14 March. She came ashore between Hondarribia and Pasaia, Spain in mid-April.
Samaritan	United Kingdom	The brig foundered in the Atlantic Ocean. Her crew were rescued.
Tamerlane	United Kingdom	The ship was abandoned on the coast 15 nautical miles (28 km) south west of Campbeltown, Argyllshire before 16 March. She was taken into Campbeltown on that day.
Trouvadore	Spain	The slave ship was wrecked off East Caicos with the loss of about 100 lives. There were 213 survivors.
William Pitt	United Kingdom	The ship was driven ashore at Whitburn, County Durham. She was refloated on 11 March and taken into South Shields for repairs.
