= Roxburgh Castle (ship) =

Several ships have been named Roxburgh Castle for Roxburgh Castle:

- Roxburgh Castle (1809 ship) was launched in Spain in 1803 under another name. She was taken in prize in 1809 and her new owners renamed her. She was wrecked in 1814.
- Roxburgh Castle (1825 ship) was launched by Wigrams & Green, Blackwall. She made two voyages for the British East India Company, during the first of which she captured a slave schooner with 125 slaves that she delivered to Sierra Leone. She was condemned as unseaworthy after survey in 1842 and sold for breaking up.
- Roxburgh Castle (1852 ship) was launched at Sunderland. She was sold to a Danish company in 1870. She was wrecked in 1872.
- Roxburgh Castle (1880 ship) was an iron screw-steamer launched at Sunderland. She was sunk in a collision with British Peer in 1891.
- Roxburgh Castle (1937 ship), of 7,801 GRT, was launched by Harland and Wolff, Belfast, as a refrigerated cargo ship. She sustained some bomb damage on 21 December 1940 and again on 4 May 1941. U-107 torpedoed and sank her in the Atlantic Ocean on 22 February 1943 at (38°12′N 26°22′W), north of the Azores, Portugal.
- Roxburgh Castle (1945), of 8,003 GRT, was built by Harland and Wolff. She was broken up in 1971.
