= Benito de Soto =

Spanish pirate

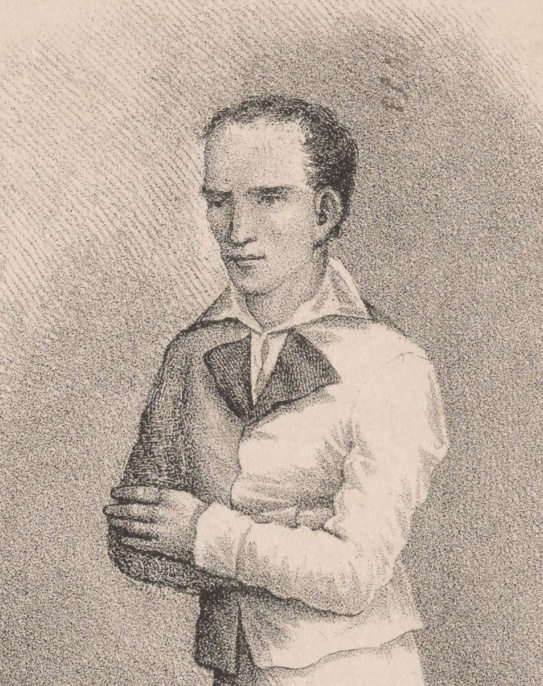
1830 lithograph of Soto

Benito de Soto Aboal (22 March 1805 – 25 January 1830) was a Spanish pirate who operated in the Atlantic during the early 19th century. He was the captain of the pirate ship Defensor de Pedro, sometimes incorrectly named as the Burla Negra ("Black Joke"), that was responsible for several piracies in the Atlantic in 1828, in a period of increased piracy following the independence of the new states of South America.

The most notable attacks were on the British Indiaman Morning Star and the American ship Topaz, which involved great violence. De Soto was captured and tried in Gibraltar on 20 January 1830 and he was hanged on 25 January. Other members of his crew were captured in Spain. Their trial there began on 19 November 1829 and ten men were executed on 11 and 12 January 1830.

== Early life ==
Benito de Soto was born on 22 March 1805 in the hamlet of Moureira (now a suburb of Pontevedra), Spain.

== Turn to piracy ==
Defensor de Pedro was a Brazilian brig, commanded by a naval officer Mariz de Sousa Sarmento. In 1827 the Brazilian government gave Sarmento a licence to trade in slaves and as privateer, participating in the irregular warfare between Brazil and its neighbour the United Provinces of Buenos Aires (later Argentina). Sarmento assembled a multinational crew of around forty men, mostly from Brazil itself but also from Galicia, in north-western Spain, Portugal and France. Benito de Soto was engaged as the second mate. The Defensor de Pedro left Rio de Janeiro on 22 November 1827 arrived off Elmina, on the Gold Coast (modern Ghana), around 3 January 1828.

On 26 January, Sarmento went ashore with around eight members of the crew, and a Galician named Miguel Ferreira led a mutiny. Not all the crew joined in and the successful rebels forced ten of those who refused to join them into a boat and forced another ten to stay on board to man the ship. It seems that no slaves had yet been loaded, so the Defensor de Pedro sailed away into the South Atlantic as a pirate. There was now a crew of twenty-three men on board. There is no evidence either at this or any other stage that the crew changed the name of the ship to Burla Negra.

== Atrocities ==
He proved to be one of the most bloodthirsty pirates of any age, murdering crews who fell into his hands and sinking their ships.

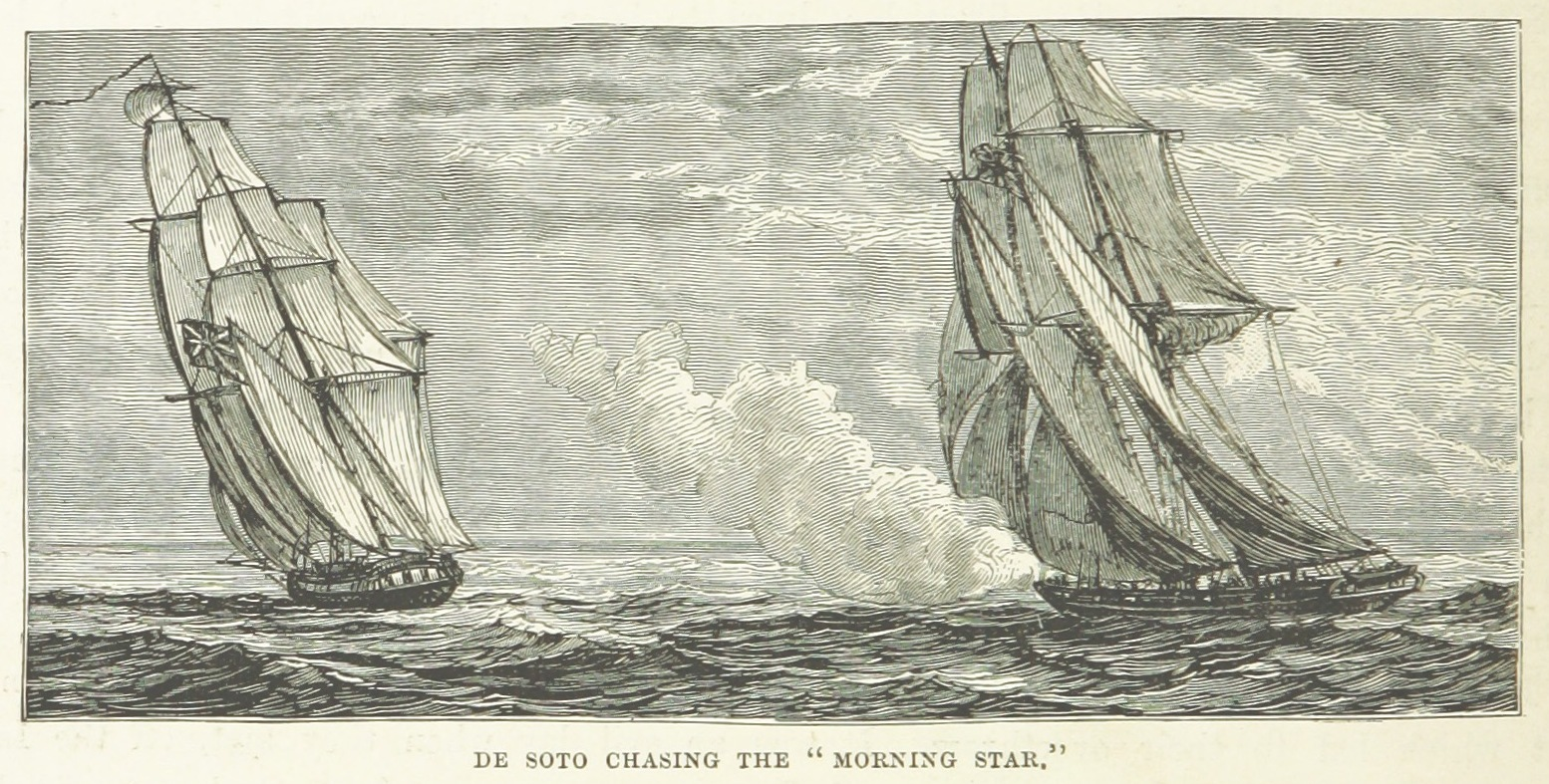
An illustration of Defensor de Pedro chasing Morning Star

The most infamous episode in de Soto's career came on 19 February 1828, when the Burla Negra happened upon the Morning Star en route from Ceylon to England. After killing some of the passengers and crew with cannon fire, de Soto murdered the captain and took possession of the ship.

Many of the captured crew were killed, while women passengers were raped before de Soto's men locked them in the hold with the rest of the survivors. When de Soto heard that the survivors had been locked away and not murdered, he was furious, turned them around to try to find the sinking Morning Star to finish the job. He did not want any evidence of his guilt in the attack to reach the ears of the court. However, de Soto could not find the drifting Morning Star. Meanwhile, the imprisoned survivors had managed to escape and prevent the Morning Star from sinking. A passing merchant vessel rescued them the following day.

According to Defensor de Pedro crew member Nicholas Fernandez, "A few days after the capture and destruction of the English ship [Morning Star], we fell in with a richly laden American ship (the Topaz) bound from Calcutta to Boston, to the crew of which no more mercy was shewn than to that of the Morning Star - having laden our brig with a portion of the most valuable part of her cargo, the crew (with the exception of the captain and three hands, who were taken on board the brig) were all put to death, and the ship set on fire! and in a few days after, the captain and two of the three hands shared the fate of their companions! - we had now indeed from repeated instances, become so familiarized with the shedding of human blood, that the shrieks and groans of the devoted victims were about music to our ears! and the work of human butchery was performed as deliberately and with as much unconcern as the butcher would dispatch one of the brute animals of his flock!"

By August 1828 news spread in American papers about the murder of the Topaz crew. "The following is a list of the officers and crew of the ship Topaz of Boston, which vessel was taken by pirates, and destroyed, and the whole crew murdered. Martin Brewster, born in Kingston, Mass., aged 32, master, Arnold S. Manchester, Little Compton, R.I., aged 30, first mate; Edward Smith, Ipswich, Mass., 21, second mate; John Barber (black), New York, 28, steward; Samuel Gulliver (black) New York, 36, cook; T. J. Yates, Boston, 27; William S. Burton, do. 40; Adam S. Huger, do. 18, Israel Smith, do 18; John Drew, Halifax N.S., 24; William Appley, Barnstable, 19; Edward Keyser, Philadelphia, 34; Albert Richmond, Dighton, 24; Henry Williams, New York, 23 - all seaman."

De Soto then sailed for Corunna. On the way he encountered a small brig; he attacked and sank it, killing all the crew but one. De Soto forced the remaining sailor to steer the Burla Negra to Corunna; when they arrived at the port, de Soto blew the man's brains out.

== Capture and death ==
De Soto's crimes caught up with him after the Burla Negra struck a reef and was wrecked off Cádiz. He and his men headed for Gibraltar, but they were recognized and taken for trial in Cádiz. De Soto was hanged with his remaining crew. When the hangman discovered that he had set the rope at the wrong height, De Soto calmly stood on his own coffin and obligingly placed his head inside the noose.

He died on 25 January 1830. Adeus todos ("goodbye, everyone") were his last words. His head was then stuck on a pike as a warning to others.
