= Bonavista (1825 ship) =

UK merchant ship 1825–1828

History

United Kingdom
- Name: Bonavista
- Launched: 1825, Sunderland
- Fate: Wrecked 18 March 1828

General characteristics
- Type: Snow
- Tons burthen: 237 (bm)
- Propulsion: Sail

Bonavista, also known as Bona Vista, was a sailing ship built in 1825 at Sunderland. She was wrecked while on a voyage from Port Jackson to Isle of France (now Mauritius) upon Kenn Reef on 18 March 1828.

== Career ==
Bonavista first appeared in Lloyd's Register (LR) in the volume for 1826.

Year	Master	Owner	Trade	Source
1826	R.Towns	Captain & Co.	Exmouth–Madeira; London–Mauritius	LR

On 30 April 1826 Bonavista, Towns, master, sailed from Gravesend, bound for Mauritius, Penang, and Sincapore. She arrived at the Cape of Good Hope on 27 July, and sailed for Mauritius on 30 July. She arrived at Mauritius on 31 August.

Bonavista, Towns, master, left Batavia on 19 December 1826 and arrived at Port Jackson on 18 February 1827. She left Port Jackson on 7 April for Isle of France (Mauritius). She arrived back in Port Jackson on 1 November from the Cape of Good Hope. At the Cape of Good Hope Towns petitioned the Lieutenant Governor to permit Towns to sell 520 casks of flour that he had brought with the intention of using the proceeds to buy local wines to take back to Australia. At the time there were restrictions on the importation of wheat and flour to the Cape. The Council decided that it would permit Towns to sell his wheat after payment of a 3% ad valorem duty, and on his posting bond that he would export an equal value of local produce.

On 9 March 1828 she sailed in company with Denmark Hill on a voyage from Port Jackson to Mauritius. The two vessels separated that night. Bonavista was wrecked upon Kenn Reef on 18 March, at 21°S 156°E. Captain Robert Towns, and his crew and passengers, spent eight weeks and six days on the reef before Asia, Thomas Stead, master, rescued them. Three crew men died, one when Bonavista wrecked and two during the rescue.

Captain Towns produced detailed instructions for sailing from Port Jackson to Torres Strait that later appeared in directories.
