= Denmark Hill (1814 ship) =

UK merchant ship 1825–1829

History

United Kingdom
- Name: Denmark Hill
- Namesake: Denmark Hill
- Launched: 1809, Boston Massachusetts
- Fate: Wrecked 26 April 1939

General characteristics
- Tons burthen: 250, or 252, or 25260/94, or 257 (bm)
- Armament: 6 × 9-pounder guns

Denmark Hill was launched at Boston, Massachusetts, in 1809, under another name. She was taken in prize and in 1814 her new owners renamed her. She then spent another 25 years as a merchant ship. She transferred her registry to New South Wales and was lost there in 1839. During this time she also made some voyages as a whaler in the waters off New Zealand.

== Career ==
The Vice admiralty court at Halifax, Nova Scotia condemned the prize on 6 January 1814. (Note: There are two vessels listed among the prizes with a burthen close to that of Denmark Hill. One was the brig Monk, J.P.Felt master, that HMS Colibri captured on 23 August 1812. Monk, of 253 tons (bm), had been sailing from Rio de Janeiro to Salem with a cargo of sugar, hides, and horns when captured. The second was the brig Sarah, R.Pendergrast master, which had been sailing from New York to Amsterdam when HMS Tenedos captured her on 19 February 1813. She had been carrying a cargo of 425 bales of cotton, 186 barrels of post ashes, and 3000 pipe staves.)

Denmark Hill sailed from Halifax on 9 April, bound for Jamaica. She arrived at Barbados on 9 May and Kingston, Jamaica on 8 May. She sailed from Kingston on 30 June, and arrived at Gravesend on 30 August.

Denmark Hill first appeared in Lloyd's Register (LR) in 1815.

| Year | Master | Owner | Trade | Source |
|---|---|---|---|---|
| 1815 | Coultson | H.Gibson | London; London transport | LR |

On 29 May 1815 Denmark Hill was serving as a transport, carrying troops, when she ran aground on Margate Sands. She was gotten off and proceeded to the Downs. Later, Denmark Hill sailed to Leghorn, Archangel, and Rio de Janeiro.

| Year | Master | Owner | Trade | Source & notes |
|---|---|---|---|---|
| 1816 | Coultson; J.Stoker | H.Gibson | London transport London–Rio de Janeiro | LR |
| 1818 | J.Stoker; C.Palin | H.Gibson; Shearman | London–Rio de Janeiro | LR |
| 1821 | C.Pallin; Foreman | Shearman | Plymouth–Pernambuco; London–New South Wales | LR; small repairs 1821 |

Denmark Hill, Foreman, master, left London on 6 January 1822, Madeira on 20 January, and the Derwent on 13 June. She arrived in Sydney on 19 June with cargo and passengers. One of the passengers she brought was Ebenezer Shoobridge. Denmark Hill left Sydney on 9 May 1823 with a full cargo of colonial produce, and arrived back at Gravesend on 21 September.

On 8 April 1824 Denmark Hill sailed from London, for Madeira and New South Wales. She arrived at Van Diemen's Land on 31 August and Sydney on 1 October. Se had brought 38 passengers. She sailed for Rio de Janeiro on 26 January 185 and arrived there on 15 March 1825. On 15 August Denmark Hill arrived at Hobart from Rio de Janeiro with 600 barrels of flour, 400 casks of wine, 190 rolls of tobacco, 50 tons of sugar, as well as burgundy, raisins, almonds, etc. She had sustained extensive damage on her voyage.

A survey on 26 August found Denmark Hill seaworthy for her onward voyage to Sydney. A second survey on, 5 September five captains, among them Andrew Ross of Security, surveyed Denmark Hill and condemned her as unseaworthy. On 18 September Denmark Hill sailed for Sydney to undergo repairs that were not possible at Hobart. On 25 September an advertisement appeared in a Hobart newspaper that she would return to Hobart after undergoing a thorough repair in Sydney and that she would then sail for the UK on or about 25 December. Denmark Hill finally sailed for Hobart on 6 December and arrived there on 13 December. She sailed on 13 January 1826 with 50 tons of blue gum plank, 7500 treenails for ships, made of blue gum, 100 tons of mimosa bark, 10 tons mimosa extract, 30 tons of wool, three bundles of whalebone, 27 hogsheads of seal skins, and 330 kangaroo skins. She arrived at London prior to 16 July.

| Year | Master | Owner | Trade | Source & notes |
|---|---|---|---|---|
| 1826 | J.Foreman | Captain | London–New South Wales | LR; small repairs 1821 & part new wales & new deck 1826 |

On 25 October 1826 Denmark Hill, Foreman, master, sailed from England for Van Diemen's Land and New South Wales.

Denmark Hill arrived at Sydney on 1 July 1827, having left on 6 February. On 22 August she left for Mauritius, sailing via Hobart. She arrived at Hobart on 30 August. She was carrying 600 bags of sugar, 14 cases of crockery, 828 cedar boards, five cases of Sydney-made cheese, 20 bundle of gags, cases of cotton, and 84 tons of coal as ballast. The 30 tons of sugar were for Hobart. On 6 September Denmark Hill, Foreman, master, sailed for Mauritius to bring back more sugar, which was in short supply in Sydney. She returned on 14 January 1828 with 200 tons of sugar, plus some other merchandise. She had sailed from Mauritius on 28 November. From Hobart she sailed to Sydney. She sailed from Sydney on 6 March, bound for Mauritius for more sugar. She had to put back because of adverse winds, but sailed again on 17 March. She arrived back at Sydney from Mauritius on 4 August. She had left Mauritius on 14 June and brought 300 tons of sugar, wine, and two Arab horses that belonged to R.C.Princeps, of Calcutta, that would be offered at auction. On 5 October Denmark Hill, Foreman, master, sailed for the Cape of Good Hope, via Hobart, with a cargo of cedar and coal. She was at Table Bay by 15 April 1829. She had sailed via Cape Horn and on her way had to stop at Rio de Janeiro for water. On 7 May she sailed from Cape Town, bound for Mauritius. She left Mauritius on 38 June, and arrived at Hobart on 13 August with sugar, wine, raisins, and tobacco. She sailed for Sydney on 5 September and arrived there on 14 September. Her cargo included whale oil from the Derwent that she offered for sale in Sydney. On 19 November Denmark Hill sailed for Mauritius via Hobart. She arrived at Mauritius on 8 January 1830. She arrived back at Sydney on 1 April with sugar.

After Denmark Hill's return from this last voyage a Sydney newspaper reported that she had made three voyages between the UK and Sydney, four to Mauritius and back to Sydney, and one to Brazil and Cape Town. It estimated that these voyages had resulted in a cumulative 200,000 miles sailed. It also mentioned that Mrs. Foreman had accompanied her husband, Captain John Foreman, on these voyages and had made four circumnavigations of the world. In addition to his commercial cargo, Foreman had brought plants and seeds from Mauritius for the Colonial Botanical garden.

Denmark Hill was hove down to undergo refitting. The newspaper account suggested that she would be employed as a whaler in the sperm whale fishery. Captain Foreman was reported to be seeking a buyer.

On 3 August 1830 Denmark Hill again sailed for Mauritius. She left Mauritius on 3 October and arrived back at Sydney on 6 December with 3,000 bags of sugar. On his voyage back to Sydney Captain Foreman suffered an eye illness that it was expected would render him blind. He offered Denmark Hill for sale on 7 January 1831 as he wished to retire from the sea.

On 8 February 1831 she was reported to have been sold for £2,700 to a Mr.T[homas] H[orton] James. The same report stated the Captain Foreman had regained his sight.

Mr. James had intended to sail Denmark Hill to New Zealand on a missionary voyage, but instead chartered her to a Mr. Pitman for a voyage to the Society and Sandwich Islands. On 15 May she sailed for the Sandwich Islands with Harrison, master, and several passengers, including Mrs. Harrison and T.J.Pitman. Denmark Hill's consisted of 26 cases and two casks of wine, two casks and two cases of beer, four cases of paper, one case of beads, fur hogsheads of brandy, 35 cases of rum, 21 cases of gin, one keg of tobacco, 270 cedar planks, 3,384 cedar boards, 128 planks of hard wood, 354 pieces and 33,027 feet scantling, 132 pieces hard wood, 58 pieces of Huon pine, and stores. Denmark Hill sailed via New Zealand. She reached "Whoahoa" (possibly Oahu). She was to have gone on to Canton, but two men chartered her for a whaling voyage.

The next report was that the American Consul at "Whahoa" had purchased Denmark Hill and had equipped and sent her on a whaling voyage. (Note: The first United States Consular Agent to the Kingdom of Hawaii was John Coffin Jones Jr.)

On 8 July 1832, Denmark Hill, M'Auliffe, master, was eight months out of Wahoa and had gathered 450 barrels of whale oil. On 3 March 1833 Denmark Hill, Mc'Auliffe, master, arrived at Sydney with 190 (or 192) tons of sperm oil. She had sailed from the Sandwich Islands on 31 October 1831. She unloaded her oil, which was to go to London on Nelson, together with that from Cadmus. Actually, the oil from Denmark Hill was shipped on Dryade, together with 40 tons from Tamar. Denmark Hill then underwent a survey to determine what refitting she would need for another whaling voyage.

Denmark Hill was put up for sale. The notice gave her owner's name as H.G. Pitman, suggesting that she had not been sold in the Sandwich Islands, but only chartered. She sold on 18 May 1833 for £440 to Messrs. Dawes, Gore, & Co.

On 16 July Denmark Hill, Finlay, master, sailed for New Zealand with stores. She served as a storeship for whalers in Cloudy Bay. A report in September stated that she had put into the Bay in a leaky condition and with 90 tons of oil on board, and that she would put to sea again. She arrived back at Sydney on 18 March 1834 with 830 barrels of black oil. Customs recorded 105 tons of black oil and five tons of whale bone. She also carried three cases of apparel and two rolls of charts.

On 13 June 1834 Denmark Hill sailed for the sperm fishery with stores. She sailed from Cloudy Bay on 9 November and arrived at Sydney on 18 November. She was carrying 190 tons of black oil and 1244 bundles of whale bone. She also brought some passengers, the captain and five seamen from the schooner Shamrock, and three seamen from Harriet, which had been wrecked at New Zealand. (Note: Shamrock had capsized in Queen Charlotte Sound, New Zealand, during August or September.) Red Rover conveyed Denmark Hill's oil to England.

On 16 March 1835 Denmark Hill, Finlay, master, sailed with whaling stores for the New Zealand whaling grounds. On 6 July New Zealander arrived at Sydney from Cloudy Bay. She carried oil from Denmark Hill and Cornwallis. When New Zealander left Cloudy Bay she left Denmark Hill there with 60 tons of oil. Denmark Hill left New Zealand on 17 September and arrived at Sydney on 8 October with 200 tuns of black oil, 10 tons of whalebone, and one keg of tobacco. She discharged her cargo into Hercules to take to London.

On 6 December 1835 Denmark Hill sailed for the South Seas. On 13 March 1836, she returned to Sydney with 110 barrels of oil. She had returned to refit and be ready for the New Zealand whaling season.

On 7 April Denmark Hill, Finlay, master, sailed for the sperm fishery, with stores. On 30 July she was at Old Man's Bluff with 100 tons of oil. She returned to Sydney on 1 November with 160 tons. Her relative success was attributed to Captain Finlay having avoided Cloudy Bay and having instead gone whaling in the less-frequented Favaux's Straait. She discharged her oil into Richard Reynolds, which would carry it, as well as oil from a number of other whalers, to London.

On her return Denmark Hill was laid up for some months and Captain Finlay transferred to command of another vessel. She finally sailed, under Captain Cole, on 15 May 1837, bound for the whale fishery. She only got as far as Watson's Bay before stopping. She proceeded on 22 May. In June she was at Cloudy Bay, clean, i.e., not yet having taken any whales. On 11 March 1838 she returned to Sydney from Bay of Islands with a cargo of 29,199 New Zealand pipe staves, six spars, seven "rickars", and 300 iron poles. Her master was Captain Halliday.

On 19 June Denmark Hill, Brown, master, sailed for Newcastle, New South Wales in ballast, intending to load coal there. By 6 July she was back at Sydney, discharging her cargo of coals. She was to undergo an overhaul and caulking before proceeding to Port Phillip.

On 28 September Denmark Hill, Dawbeney, master, sailed for Port Phillip. She was carrying two tons, 83 casks, 120 bags of flour, one cask and on case slops, one keg of tobacco, six chests and six half-chests of tea, one bale of woolpacks, 43 bags of sugar, five puncheons rum, one pipe and five hogsheads of brandy, on hogshead and five cases of gin, five pipes and 24 half-pipes of wine, 48 tons of coals, 83 cwt, 18 casks, and 27 bags of salt, 114 bags of bran, 17 pieces, 58 boards, and 34 logs of cedar, 246 pieces of scantling, 17 casks of bottled ale, six casks of ale, 129 bags of maize, one cask of corks, 10 casks of beer, two pianofortes, and two casks of porter. She arrived at Port Phillip on 12 October.

While she was there a newspaper article stated that she was intended to be used as a floating store at William's Town. she would take on goods from vessels with too deep a draught to proceed up the Yarra Yarra to Melbourne. Denmark Hill also brought with her a small paddle-steamer named Firefly, that would travel up and down between Gellibrand Point (William's Town), and Melbourne. (Note: Firefly was broken up in January 1840; her engine was transferred to a sawmill.)

Instead, on 27 December, Denmark Hill, Brown, master, sailed for South Australia with 915 sheep, and two hundred cows. In going out she grounded in the eastern channel. She was gotten off with the loss of only one sheep. She proceeded on her journey on 8 January 1839. Bad weather then forced her to return to unload her sheep, of which she had lost 25.

She left Port Phillip on 25 February with wool, and arrived at Sydney on 2 March.

On 7 April she sailed for Newcastle, but had to return to Watson's Bay because of contrary winds. She sailed the next day. She arrived at Newcastle and by 9 April was loading coal for Port Phillip. While loading coal she fell on her side. After she was righted she sailed for Sydney.

== Loss ==
Denmark Hill, which had sprung a leak following a recent capsize at Newcastle, was beached in Broken Bay on 26 April 1839. Sophia Jane rescued her crew. Before Denmark Hill was beached Sophia Jane had taken her into tow. While doing so, Sophia Jane ran into Denmark Hill. Sophia Jane's mate and two men fell overboard; the mate was rescued but the two seamen were drowned.

== Post-script ==
On 3 November 1842, the cutter Rover struck the wreck of Denmark Hill and foundered off Pitt Water. Rover was on a voyage from Pitt Water to Sydney.
