= Lalla Rookh (1825 ship) =

Brig built in 1825

History

United Kingdom of Great Britain and Ireland
- Name: Lalla Rookh
- Owner: Thomas & John Fenwick
- Route: Transatlantic (UK / British North America & United States)
- Builder: Thomas Metcalfe & Son, South Shields
- Launched: 17 March 1825
- Fate: Wrecked on rocks off Wick, Scotland, 11/12 April 1836

General characteristics
- Class & type: Brig (Note: "rigged as a Snow")
- Tons burthen: 333 tons
- Length: 98.3 feet (30.0 m)

Lalla Rookh was a wooden sailing vessel, 333 tons, built by Thomas Metcalfe & Son in South Shields, "rigged as a Snow", meaning that, unlike a normal brig, she had an extra lower square sail on the main mast, which provided additional power. She was completed in March 1825 and owned by Thomas & John Fenwick of North Shields.

On 12 August 1825 Lalla Rookh, under Captain B. R. Jones arrived at Liverpool from Quebec with cargo of timber and wheat. In early October, she was bound for Miramichi, and on 24 December arrived back at Liverpool, under Jones, from Miramichi, described as "of North Shields".

On 19 April 1826 she sailed for Miramichi under Jones, and on 19 July 1826 arrived back in Liverpool.

From November 1826 to August 1827 there were further trips between Liverpool and Quebec under Jones.

In 1828 she trades at Malta and Smyrna under Captain Jones, carrying goods such as berries, currants and cotton.

On 23 October 1829 she sailed from Trieste under Green.

On 9 April 1831 she was at sea en route from Mobile to Liverpool.

On 15 May 1832 Lalla Rookh "of Newcastle" arrives in Liverpool from Alexandria, Virginia(?), under Captain Green. (Note: Assuming this is the Alexandria referred to, as this ship appeared to be travelling to the Americas, and as per info in The Maritime Heritage Project source.)

On 8 April 1833, she returns to Liverpool from New Orleans under Green. On 26 April she is loaded for a voyage to Charleston. On 13 November 1833 she sails for Mobile under Green. On 8 February 1834 "the brig Lalla Rookh", under Green, anchored at Port Antonio, Jamaica, for a few days en route to Mobile, 57 days after leaving Liverpool. She had picked up passengers from an American brig, who had rescued them from the wreck of the Sneaton Castle.

On 14 May 1835 Lalla Rookh under Captain Green was reported to be "from Mobile at the Clyde". On 21 September 1835 she arrived at Kingston upon Hull from Quebec under Captain Green, having sustained damage after striking the pier, with "ten feet water in her hold".

Lalla Rookh was wrecked near Wick, near the northern tip of mainland Scotland, around midnight on 11 or 12 April 1836. She was sailing from Newcastle-upon-Tyne to Quebec in ballast under the command of Captain Green, during a severe easterly gale, and was driven onto rocks at Elzy, a couple of miles east of Wick. The ship was described as "of and from Newcastle". The crew were all saved.
