= USRC Detector =

Ship of the U.S. Revenue Cutter Service

History

United States
- Ordered: 7 July 1825
- Awarded: 27 August 1815
- Builder: Fisher & Webster, North Yarmouth, Maine
- Commissioned: 1825
- Home port: Portland, Maine
- Fate: Sold 1832

General characteristics
- Class & type: Wasp-class schooner
- Displacement: 62 tons
- Length: 52 ft (16 m)
- Beam: 18 ft 3 in (5.56 m)
- Draft: 6 ft 2 in (1.88 m)
- Propulsion: sail
- Sail plan: Baltimore Clipper
- Crew: 13

USRC Detector was a Wasp-class schooner built for and operated by the United States Revenue Cutter Service from 1825 to 1832. She is the second ship of the Revenue Cutter Service to bear the name.

== Design and construction ==
On 7 July 1825, the Revenue Cutter Service authorized the construction of two 55-ton cutters. These ships, later named Detector and Wasp, would differ in design as the Wasp weighed 5 tons lighter. The ships were designed by naval constructor William Doughty in 1815, after he was asked to design three new classes of cutters for the service to recuperate the fleet from losses suffered during the War of 1812. The future Detector was the second largest design in the batch, designed after the Baltimore Clipper model.

Both ships were designed with a keel made of rock maple wood, planking from oak, a billet head, and a squared stern. She was 52 feet long (15.8 meters), had a beam of 18 feet, 3 inches (5.6 meters), and a draft of 6 feet, 2 inches (1.8 meters). Detector appears to have not been armed, compared to the two four-pounder cannons on the Wasp. She was manned by a crew of 13.

A contract for the two ships' construction was authorized on 27 August 1815 to Fisher and Webster of North Yarmouth, Maine. The ship's construction in Portland, Maine was overseen by a captain in the Revenue Cutter Service.

== Service history ==
Detector was stationed out of Portland for her entire career after she was commissioned in 1825. A previous USRC Detector (1812), built in 1812, was stationed in Portland and sold the same year she entered service. On 1 January 1832 she was relieved by USRC Morris, followed by being sold at Portland the same year.
