= Dryade (1825 ship) =

UK merchant ship 1825–1841

History

United Kingdom
- Name: Dryade
- Namesake: Dryad
- Builder: William Scott & Sons, Bristol
- Launched: 25 April 1825
- Fate: Abandoned circa March 1841

General characteristics
- Tons burthen: 266, or 26620/94 (bm)
- Length: 95 ft 11 in (29.2 m)
- Beam: 25 ft 3 in (7.7 m)25'3

Dryade was launched at Bristol in 1825. She traded between England and Peru or the Indian Ocean, and then spent most of her career trading between England and New South Wales. Her crew and passengers abandoned her circa March 1841 when she developed a leak while sailing from Mauritius to London.

== Career ==
Although Dryade was built at Bristol, she does not appear in the most comprehensive work on ships built in Bristol between 1800 and 1838. (Note: Farr was aware of Dryade, of 266 tons, launched in 1825, as he mentioned her in correspondence.) This suggests that she was immediately sold to London and never registered at Bristol.

Dryade first appeared in the Register of Shipping (RS) in 1825, and in Lloyd's Register (LR) in 1826

Year	Master	Owner	Trade	Source & notes
1825	Davison	Davison	London–Lima	RS
1826	Davidson	Davidson	Falmouth–Lima	LR

On 31 August 1825, Dryade, Davidson, master, sailed from Deal for Valparaiso and Lima. She sailed via Falmouth, where she waited for almost a month, and then via Madeira.

Year	Master	Owner	Trade	Source & notes
1827	Davidson; Killock	Davidson	Falmouth–Lima	LR
1828	Killock	Richardson	London–CGH	RS

In 1813 the EIC had lost its monopoly on the trade between India and Britain. British ships were then free to sail to India or the Indian Ocean under a licence from the EIC.

On 27 September 1827 Dryade, Killock, master, sailed for Mauritius.

Year	Master	Owner	Trade	Source & notes
1829	Kellock	Richardson	London–Mauritius	LR; damages repaired 1828
1830	Kellock; Heard	Richardson	Plymouth–Calcutta	LR; damages repaired 1828

After her voyages to Mauritius and India, Dryade traded with Sydney. On 15 June 1830 Dryade, Robert Heard, master, sailed from Portsmouth, bound for Van Diemen's Land. On 22 September 1830, Dryade, of 260 tons, Heard, master, arrived at Hobart. On 29 December she arrived at Sydney. While she was on her way an unidentified swift-sailing and armed vessel hung around Dryade for several hours. Captain Heard feared that the vessel was a pirate and made preparations. The vessel sailed off after she got close enough to see that Dryade's crew and passengers were well-armed and prepared to resist. On 16 March 1831 she sailed for England with a cargo of wool.

On 11 October 1831, Dryade was at Torbay, on her way to Sydney. She arrived at Sydney on 21 February 1832. She sailed for London on 12 April, with 312 casks of sperm oil (from Elizabeth and Mary Jane), 131 bales of flax, 72 bales of wool, one cedar log, 180 wheel spokes, 12,546 treenails, and stores. She arrived in England on 28 August 1832.

Dryade, Heard, master, sailed from Britain of 4 December, and on 2 April 1833, arrived at Sydney. For her back–haul cargo she took on the whale oil that Tamar had gathered in the New South Wales fishery and brought into Sydney. Dryade also transshipped the oil from Denmark Hill, together with 40 tons from Tamar. Dryade sailed for London on 26 May with 270 tuns of whale oil and 23 bales of wool, among other cargo. Alternatively, she carried 448 casks of sperm oil, 28 bundles of whalebone, 25 bales of wool, 42 cedar planks, 281 hides, 14,231 tree nails, and stores.

Dryade, Heard, master, left Falmouth on 9 February 1834 and arrived at Sydney on 2 June. She sailed on 12 July for Batavia and Singapore, sailing in ballast. The British East India Company (EIC) had given up its maritime activities in 1833 and so British vessels now could trade between Asia and the Britain without the need to acquire a license from the EIC.

From Singapore Dryade may have returned to Sydney before sailing for England on 3 December. He sailed with a cargo of sheep. After passing New Zealand he slaughtered 2 sheep. The cold kept the meat "sweet" until it had been completely consumed by the time she reached Trinidad.

On 26 November 1835, Dryade arrived at Hobart, Van Diemen's Land. She had left London on 26 July. She left Hobart on 10 December and arrived at Sydney on 22 December. On 16 January 1836 she sailed for Newcastle, New South Wales, to load wool. She returned to Sydney on 28 February. She left for England on 1 April. She was carrying 647 bales of wool, one case of tea, 212 bundles of rattans, one bale of waistcoatings, six cases of curios, and stores. She arrived at Gravesend on 28 August.

Dryade left England on 27 April 1838, and arrived at Sydney on 28 August. In Sydney she loaded oil from William Stoveld. (Note: William Stoveld, of 188 tons (bm), had engaged in whaling after having come out to New South Wales with general cargo. She had arrived at Sydney on 28 August, with 1000 barrels of oil.) Pocklington and Merope too transshipped oil on Dryade. (Note: Pocklington, of 208 tons (bm), had been launched at Hull in 1810. She made one whaling voyage to New South Wales waters between 1823 and 1826. She may have relocated to Sydney on a subsequent voyage. In 1818 Merope, of 320 tons (bm), was launched at Fort Gloster (Calcutta). She was sold to New South Wales.) The brig Martha brought oil from New Zealand and also transferred it to Dryade. Dryade stowed the oil in her lower hold and reserved the tweendecks for wool. She left Sydney on 2 December, with 95 bales of wool, 471 bundles of whalebone, 221 casks of sperm oil, 105 casks of black whale oil, 387 salted hides, one cased pianoforte, three cases of stationary, one box of papers, and one case of specimens of natural history. She also carried 13,000 letters. She was at Portsmouth on 4 May 1839 and arrived at London on 10 May.

Dryade left Gravesend for Sydney on 16 July. She put in at the Cape of Good Hope for water on 22 October, and sailed from the Cape on 26 October. She arrived at Sydney on 3 January 1840.

Year	Master	Owner	Trade	Source & notes
1840	R.Heard	Richardson	London–New South Wales	LR; small repairs 1835 & 1838

On 15 February 1840, Dryade sailed for Guam in ballast. In August Dryade was reported to have been at Manila, loading for Sydney. Dryade was next reported at Port Phillip, having sailed from Manila on 7 July. Her cargo consisted of 6002 bags sugar, 145 casks of brewer's sugar, 49 cases sugar, 22 casks of rum, 82 boxes of tea, 547 coils of rope, 11 cases hats and cigar pouches, three trunks ditto, 1000 empty bags, three bundles of rattans, 15 of cases cigars, five jars of biscuits, three sets of baskets, 62 chests of pekoe, 168 chests of souchong, 42 chests of pouchong, 50 chests of hyson, 33 chests of imperial, 27 chests of gunpowder tea, 15 boxes of cigars, 50 pairs of shoes, 400 Manilla hats, and 129 of pounds bees' wax. She left Port Phillip on 30 September, and arrived at Sydney on 4 October.

On 26 November Dryade sailed for Mauritius with 200 tons of rice. On 20 January 1841, Dryade arrived at Mauritius from Sydney.

== Fate ==
On 24 February 1841, Dryade departed from Mauritius for London. The initial report was that there had been no further trace of her since her departure; she was presumed to have foundered with the loss of all hands.

Dryade was not lost without a trace. Four days out of Port Louis she sprang a leak that the pumps could not manage. Captain Heard then attempted to sail to Madagascar. Eventually the passengers and crew were forced to take to her boats in a heavy sea while about 200 miles from Port Dauphin, at the southern end of Madagascar. All reached Port Dauphin and remained there for 80 days, during which time the inhabitants treated them with great hospitality. Eventually a small schooner carried Dryade's passengers and crew back to Mauritius, where they arrived on 3 June. The handful of passengers included Captain Heard's wife, and son and daughter.
