= Roxburgh Castle (1825 ship) =

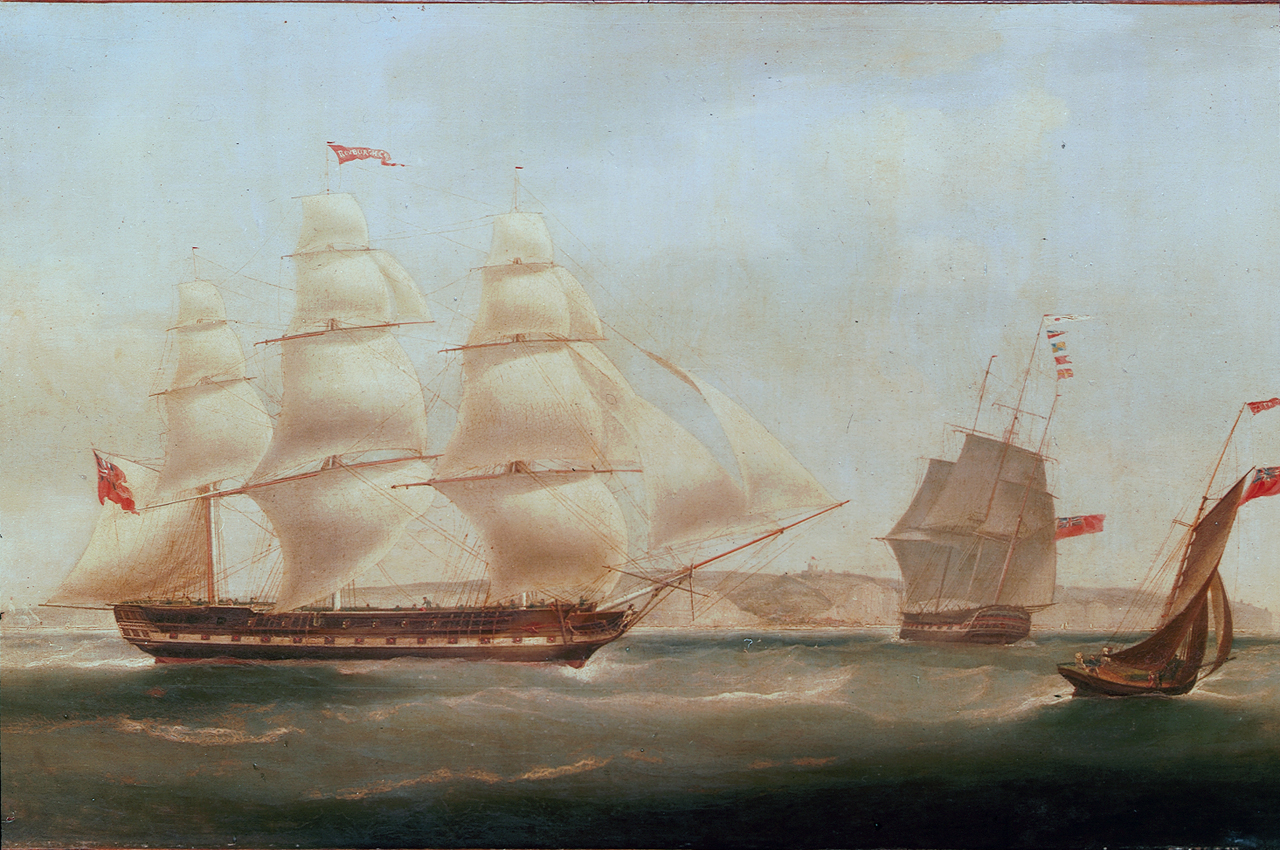
- The East Indiaman Roxburgh Castle (left), with the ship Sir Edward Paget off Dover, by William John Huggins (1781–1845); National Maritime Museum, Greenwich

History

United Kingdom
- Name: Roxburgh Castle
- Namesake: Roxburgh Castle
- Owner: Wigrams & Green
- Builder: 1825:Wigrams & Green, Blackwall; 1835:Green & Co.; 1839:J.Somes
- Launched: 22 April 1825
- Fate: Condemned c.1841

General characteristics
- Tons burthen: 56581/94, or 599, or 59990/94 or 600 (bm)
- Length: 134 ft 3 in (40.9 m)
- Beam: 31 ft 3 in (9.5 m)

Roxburgh Castle was launched by Wigrams & Green, Blackwall, in 1825. She made two voyages for the British East India Company (EIC), during the first of which she captured a slave schooner with 125 slaves that she delivered to Sierra Leone. She carried immigrants to New South Wales in 1838–1839. She was condemned as unseaworthy after survey at Mauritius and in 1842 was sold for breaking up.

== Career ==
Roxborough Castle first appeared in Lloyd's Register (LR) with G.Denny, master, Wigram, owner, and trade London–China.

=== EIC voyage #1 (1825–1826) ===
Captain George Denny sailed from the Downs on 12 June 1825, bound for China and Quebec.

On 7 July Roxburgh Castle captured a French slaver. The two vessels then arrived at Sierra Leone on 15 July (or 16 July) Denny handed the captured schooner and her 125 slaves over to the authorities before proceeding on her voyage. (Note: The slave schooner was Eleanor, of about 60 tons (bm). By one report she had 135 slaves crammed into a space that could only house 30 lying down. The reason Roxburgh Castle had been able to take control of Eleanor was that Eleanor had requested assistance from Roxburgh Castle as due to illness Eleanor had no one aboard who could navigate the schooner.)

Roxburgh Castle arrived at Whampoa anchorage on 1 November. She continued on her journey, crossing the Second Bar on 19 January 1826. She reached St Helena on 22 March, and arrived at Quebec on 8 May. She left Quebec on 23 June. She returned to her moorings in England on 8 August.

After her return from her voyage for the EIC, Roxburgh Castle continued to trade with India under a license from the EIC. LR for 183- showed her master changing from G.Denny to Battenshaw.

=== EIC voyage #2 (1830–1831) ===
Captain Thomas Buttenshaw (or Battenshaw), sailed from the Downs on 21 June 1830, bound for Bengal. She arrived at Calcutta on 9 October. Homeward bound, she was at Kedgeree on 1 January 1831. She reached St Helena on 4 March and arrived at the Downs on 1 May.

=== Later voyages ===
On 5 December 1832 Roxburgh Castle had a fire on board that was quickly extinguished.

Roxburgh Castle sailed from London on 29 December 1838, bound for New South Wales. She arrived at Sydney on 26 May 1839 and there discharged immigrants. She had sailed with 308 assisted immigrants. Fifteen (10 of them children), died on the voyage; three children were born during the voyage.

LR for 1841 showed Roxburgh Castle with Bouchier, master, J.Somes, owner, and trade London-Madras.

== Fate ==
On 7 October 1840 Roxburgh Castle. Bourchier, master, put into Mauritius, leaky. she discharged her cargo on 25 October, but was still leaky. She had been on her way to Madras and Calcutta from London. She was condemned as unseaworthy. LR for 1841 carried the annotation Condemned by her name.

Two sources simply describe her as having been lost in 1841. One of these sources separately reports that in 1842 she was condemned as unseaworthy after survey and sold for breaking up.
