= Morning Star (1825 ship) =

1825 English ship

History

United Kingdom
- Builder: Tindall, Scarborough
- Launched: 30 August 1825
- Fate: Last listed 1857

General characteristics
- Tons burthen: 245, or 300, or 345 (bm)
- Sail plan: Barque

Morning Star was launched at Scarborough in 1825. She spent her entire career sailing to Ceylon (later via Australia).

On 19 February 1828, Morning Star was attacked by pirates on the return journey to England from Ceylon. Fortuitously, she and the survivors on board were rescued, and she returned to Gravesend. British and Spanish authorities in 1830 and 1829 convicted and hanged Benito de Soto and several men of his crew on Defensor de Pedro for the attack.

Until the British East India Company (EIC) gave up its shipping activities in 1834, Morning Star sailed under a licence from the EIC. She was last listed in 1857, but had disappeared from ship arrival and departure data after 1853.

== Career ==
Morning Star first appeared in LR in 1826.

In 1813 the EIC had lost its monopoly on the trade between India and Britain. British ships were then free to sail to India or the Indian Ocean under a licence from the EIC. Morning Star immediately began trading with Ceylon under such a license.

Year	Master	Owner	Trade	Source & notes
1826	Buckham	Tindall	London–Ceylon	LR

=== Piracy incident ===
Morning Star departed Colombo on 13 December 1827 with a cargo of ebony, pepper, cinnamon and coffee; and a mixed selection of 52 British crew, passengers, invalid soldiers, wives and children. Like all Tindall ships, Morning Star did not carry arms.

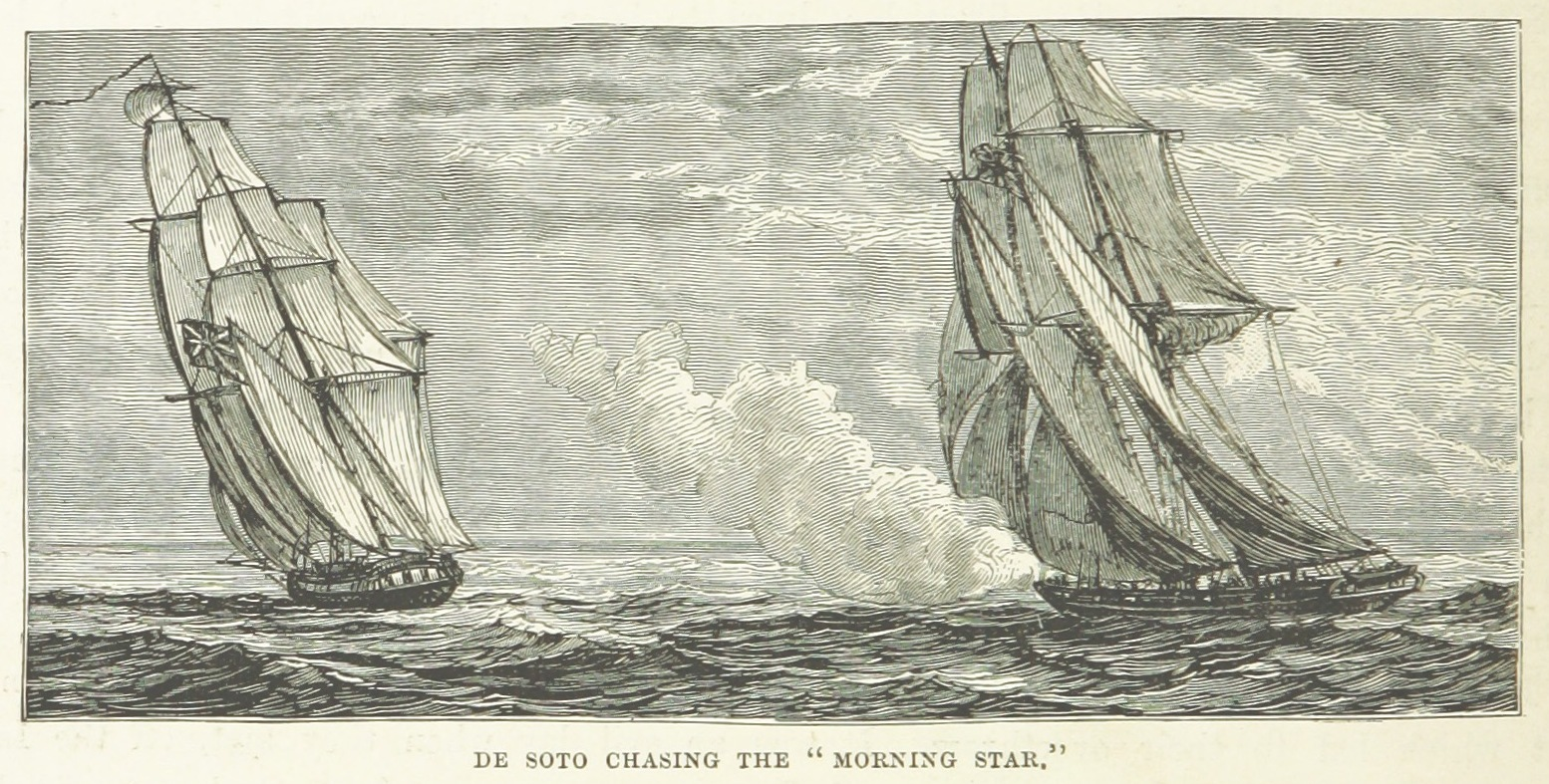
An illustration of Defensor de Pedro chasing Morning Star

Around 8 am on 19 February 1828, off Ascension Island, a swift, square-rigged brig began to pursue Morning Star. The ship was later revealed to be Defensor de Pedro, captained by the Galician pirate, Benito de Soto.

Defensor de Pedro soon caught up with Morning Star and, after firing grapeshot across the deck, damaging the ship and injuring several people, Captain Thomas Gibbs heaved to. Captain Gibbs and his second mate, Alexander Mowatt boarded Defensor de Pedro to negotiate. They were detained by Benito de Soto and later murdered along with two other Morning Star seamen.

In the meantime, a group of Benito de Soto's crew quickly boarded Morning Star. They violently robbed the passengers, stole money, food, clothing, wine, sails, navigational equipment, silks and precious stones. After executing the raid, the pirates locked the men in the hold and sexually assaulted the women in the cabins.

Before disembarking Morning Star, the pirates drilled holes in the hull to induce the ship to sink. The women escaped their confinement, tracked down the men and released them from the hold.

The survivors managed to repair the ship and keep it afloat. About one month after the attack, Morning Star encountered Captain Magnus Johnson onboard Guildford. He rendered as much assistance as he could and raised the alarm about the pirate attack. After briefly docking in Kent on 14 April 1828, Morning Star made it to Gravesend on 18 April 1828.

Year	Master	Owner	Trade	Source & notes
1833	C.Adler	Tindall & Co.	London–Bombay	LR
1833	Brown; Lintin	Tindall & Co.	London–Madeira; London–Malaga	RS
1834	W.Linton	Tindall & Co.	London–Ceylon	LR
1840	W.Linton; Harrison	Tindall	London–Ceylon	LR; thorough repair 1840
1845	Harrison; Heyward	Tindall	London; London–Ceylon	LR; thorough repair 1840 & new deck 1844
1848		Tindall	London; London–Ceylon	LR; thorough repair 1840, new deck 1844, & small repairs 1848
1850	Heyward	Tindall	London–Ceylon	LR; thorough repair 1840, new deck 1844, & small repairs 1848
1851		Tindall	London–Swan river	LR; thorough repair 1840, new deck 1844, & small repairs 1850 & 1851

From 1851 Morning star started sailing to Australia. Ship arrival and departure data showed her returning to England from Australia, sailing via Ceylon.

On 19 October 1851 the barque, Morning star, Clark(e), master, arrived at Perth with cargo and passengers. On 13 November she sailed for Champion Bay. From there she sailed on to Hobart.

Year	Master	Owner	Trade	Source & notes
1853	J.Clark	Tindall	London	LR; thorough repair 1840, new deck 1844, & small repairs 1850 & 1851
1854	J.Clark	Tindall	London–Ceylon	LR; thorough repair 1840, new deck 1844, & small repairs 1851 & 1854
1857	J.Clark	Tindall		LR;

== Fate ==
Morning Star was last listed in 1857, with minimal data, unchanged since 1854.
