= Glenburnie (1825 ship) =

History

United Kingdom
- Name: Glenburnie
- Builder: Adamson, Aberdeen
- Launched: 30 June 1825
- Fate: Foundered 23 August 1835

General characteristics
- Tons burthen: 170 (bm)
- Length: 77 ft (23 m)
- Beam: 22 ft 4 in (6.8 m)
- Draught: 14 ft 6 in (4.4 m)
- Sail plan: Schooner
- Notes: Three masts

Glenburnie was a schooner launched at Aberdeen in 1825. She traded with the West Indies and Russia. A ship ran into her in the Irish Sea on 23 August 1835 and she sank within hours.

== Career ==
Glenburnie first appeared in Lloyd's Register (LR) in 1826.

Year	Master	Owner	Trade	Source
1826	Wood	Johnstone	London–Hamburg	LR
1830	R.Allen	Knight & Co.	Liverpool–Saint Thomas	LR
1835	S.Patrick	J.Berrie	Dundee–Newcastle	LR

== Fate ==
Glenburnie, Patrick, master, collided with Pitt, off Carlingford, County Louth, on 23 August 1835 and sank in the Irish Sea off the Calf of Man, Isle of Man. Four hours after Glenburnie sank, the steamship Solway providentially rescued the crew. Glenburnie, of Dundee, was on a voyage from Saint Petersburg to Liverpool.
