= List of ship launches in 1824 =

The list of ship launches in 1824 includes a chronological list of some ships launched in 1824.

Date	Ship	Class	Builder	Location	Country	Notes
16 January	Spitfire	Steamship		Harwich	United Kingdom	For private owner.
19 January	Asia	Canopus-class ship of the line		Bombay Dockyard	India	For Royal Navy.
January	Addison	Snow		Sunderland	United Kingdom	For Addison Brown.
Unknown date	Bon Accord	Brigantine	Richard Bussell	Lyme Regis	United Kingdom	For Aberdeen & London Shipping Co.
3 February	Lord Amherst	Passenger ship	Wigram & Green	Blackwall	United Kingdom	For private owner.
7 February	North Star	Atholl-class corvette		Woolwich Dockyard	United Kingdom	For Royal Navy.
16 February	Unnamed	State barge	Thomas Courthorpe	London	United Kingdom	For Worshipful Company of Goldsmiths.
17 February	Meteor	Lightning-class paddle steamer	Oliver Lang	Deptford or Woolwich	United Kingdom	For Royal Navy.
26 February	Eleanor	Merchantman	Green	Bristol	United Kingdom	For private owner.
February	Brack	Merchantman	James Crown	Sunderland	United Kingdom	For John Cropton.
13 March	Fauvette	Iris-class schooner		Bayonne	France	For French Navy.
13 March	Aigrette	Gazelle-class schooner		Bayonne	France	For French Navy.
16 March	Turquoise	Iris-class schooner		Bayonne	France	For French Navy.
30 March	Marquis of Lansdown	Merchantman	John Scott & Co.	Calcutta	India	For private owner.
30 March	Unicorn	Modified Leda-class frigate		Chatham Dockyard	United Kingdom	For Royal Navy.
March	Gilmore	Barque	Gilmore & Co.	Sulkea	India	For Gilmore & Co.
March	Perfection	Merchantman	J. Burdon	Sunderland	United Kingdom	For Butcher & Co.
14 April	Formidable	Océan-class ship of the line	Jean Charles Antoine Barrallier	Toulon	United Kingdom	For French Navy.
5 May	Carn Brea Castle	East Indiaman	Wigram & Green	Blackwall Yard	United Kingdom	For Messrs. Huddart Brothers.
14 May	Smirnyi	Sixth rate		Saint Petersburg	Russia	For Imperial Russian Navy.
24 May	al-Ihsaniyya	Fourth rate		Rhodes	Greece	For Egyptian Navy.
27 May	Kniaz Vladimir	Selafail-class ship of the line	A. M. Kurochkin	Arkhangelsk	Russia	For Imperial Russian Navy.
27 May	Konstantin	Fifth rate	A. M. Kurochkin	Arkhangelsk	Russia	For Imperial Russian Navy.
31 May	Champion	Champion-class ship-sloop		Portsmouth Dockyard	United Kingdom	For Royal Navy.
31 May	Emma	Merchantman	Farrington & Co.	Newcastle upon Tyne	United Kingdom	For private owner.
31 May	Orestes	Orestes-class ship-sloop		Portsmouth Dockyard	United Kingdom	For Royal Navy.
31 May	Shtandart	Fourth rate	A. K. Kaverznev	Kherson	Russia	For Imperial Russian Navy.
19 June	Bordelaise	Alsacienne-class gun-brig		Cherbourg	France	For French Navy.
19 June	Champenoise	Alsacienne-class gun-brig		Cherbourg	France	For French Navy.
29 June	Pylades	Sloop		Woolwich Dockyard	United Kingdom	For Royal Navy.
30 June	Shamrock	Paddle steamer	Bland & Challoner	Liverpool	United Kingdom	For Liverpool & Belfast Steam Packet Co.
June	Hellespont	Brig		Liverpool	United Kingdom	For private owner.
June	Sir Charles Forbes	Barque	A. Hall & Co.	Aberdeen	United Kingdom	For Mr M'Innes.
June	Return	Merchantman	John M. & William Gales	Sunderland	United Kingdom	For H. Magee.
19 July	Queen of the Netherlands	Steamship	Wigram & Green	Blackwall Yard	United Kingdom	For Rotterdam Steam Packet Company.
26 July	Cybele			Lisbon	Portugal	For Portuguese Navy.
26 July	Endymion	Brig		Lorient	France	For French Navy.
27 July	Vengeance	Canopus-class ship of the line		Pembroke Dockyard	United Kingdom	For Royal Navy.
28 July	Columbus	Disposable ship	Charles Wood	Quebec	(United Kingdom of Great Britain and Ireland) Lower Canada	For private owner.
29 July	Emmanuil	Third rate	B. F. Stoke	Saint Petersburg	Russia	For Imperial Russian Navy.
9 August	Daphné	Iris-class schooner		Lorient	France	For French Navy.
25 August	Duperré	Téméraire-class ship of the line		Brest	France	For French Navy.
26 August	The City of Rochester	East Indiaman	Brindley & Co.	Rochester	United Kingdom	For Macqueen and Palmer.
9 September	Thisbe	Modified Leda-class frigate		Pembroke Dockyard	United Kingdom	For Royal Navy.
13 September	Astrakhan	Brig		Astrakhan	Russia	For Imperial Russian Navy.
13 September	Revel	Sloop	B. F. Stoke	Saint Petersburg	Russia	For Imperial Russian Navy.
16 September	Dronning Marie	Ship of the line		Holmen Naval Base	Denmark	For Royal Danish Navy.
9 October	Talbot	Atholl-class corvette		Pembroke Dockyard	United Kingdom	For Royal Navy.
22 October	Hearty	Cherokee-class brig-sloop		Chatham Dockyard	United Kingdom	For Royal Navy.
October	Cynthia	Merchantman	J. Allison	Sunderland	United Kingdom	For Allison & Co.
8 November	Surat Castle	Full-rigged ship	Wigram's & Green	Blackwall	United Kingdom	For Johnson & Meaburn.
10 November	Karl XIV Johan	Ship of the line		Karlskrona Naval Shipyard	Sweden	For Royal Swedish Navy.
22 November	Royal Charlotte	Yacht		Woolwich	United Kingdom	For Royal Navy.
30 November	Panteleimon	Third rate	I. S. Razumov	Nicholaieff	Russia	For Imperial Russian Navy.
November	Helen	Sloop		Arbroath	United Kingdom	For private owner.
November	Providence	Schooner	George Hudson	Sunderland	United Kingdom	For George Hudson.
2 December	Vesuvio	Bucentaure-class ship of the line		Castellamare di Stabia	United Kingdom	For Royal Sicilian Navy.
8 December	Hope	Cherokee-class brig-sloop		Plymouth Dockyard	United Kingdom	For Royal Navy.
Unknown date	Agenoria	Brig		North Hylton	United Kingdom	For private owner.
Unknown date	Brak	Full-rigged ship		Rotterdam	Netherlands	For Royal Netherlands Navy.
Unknown date	British Tar	Barque		Hylton Ferry	United Kingdom	For T. Forest.
Unknown date	Cadboro	Schooner		Rye	United Kingdom	For C. Hicks.
Unknown date	Caledonia	Full-rigged ship		Bombay	India	For private owner.
Unknown date	Carl Johan	Ship of the Line			Sweden	For Royal Swedish Navy.
Unknown date	City of London	Paddle steamer	T. Brocklebank	Deptford	United Kingdom	For T. Brocklebank.
Unknown date	Clairmont	Full-rigged ship		Bombay	India	For private owner.
Unknown date	Columbus	Merchantman		Sunderland	United Kingdom	For G. Wood.
Unknown date	Daphne	Merchantman	John M. & William Gales	Sunderland	United Kingdom	For John M. & William Gales.
Unknown date	Darius	Merchantman		Newcastle upon Tyne	United Kingdom	For private owner.
Unknown date	Diana	Merchantman	T. Broderick	Whitby	United Kingdom	For John Braithwaite, Robert Braithwaite and J. Frankland.
Unknown date	Dronning Lovisa	Third rate			Denmark	For Royal Danish Navy.
Unknown date	Duke of York	Paddle steamer	Benjamin Wallis	Blackwall	United Kingdom	For private owner.
Unknown date	Eliza	Barque			(United Kingdom of Great Britain and Ireland) Colony of Prince Edward Island	For private owner.
Unknown date	Ellice	West Indiaman	Philip Laing	Sunderland	United Kingdom	For Ellice & Co.
Unknown date	Elphinstone	Sloop		Bombay	India	For British East India Company.
Unknown date	Försigtigheten	Man of war			Sweden	For Royal Swedish Navy.
Unknown date	Gratitude	Snow	John M. & William Gales	Sunderland	United Kingdom	For John M. & William Gales.
Unknown date	Grecian	Brig			United Kingdom	For private owner.
Unknown date	Hendon	Merchantman	G. Kirkbride & Co.	Sunderland	United Kingdom	For Mr. Scurfield.
Unknown date	Henry Eckford	Paddle steamer	Lawrence & Sneden	New York	United States	For Mowatt Brothers & Co.
Unknown date	Hurrell	Schooner	William Bonker & James Vivian	Salcombe	United Kingdom	For Robert Hurrell and others.
Unknown date	Integrity	Brig		Redbridge	United Kingdom	For private owner.
Unknown date	Jane	Merchantman		Sunderland	United Kingdom	For private owner.
Unknown date	Jane	Merchantmen	J. Hall	Sunderland	United Kingdom	For private owner.
Unknown date	Jane	Merchantman	Philip Laing	Sunderland	United Kingdom	For G. Smith.
Unknown date	Javaan	Frigate			Netherlands	For Royal Netherlands Navy.
Unknown date	Juliana	East Indiaman			United Kingdom	For British East India Company.
Unknown date	Liffey	Paddle steamer			United Kingdom	For City of Dublin Steam Packet Company.
Unknown date	Lord Eldon	Merchantman		Sunderland, County Durham	United Kingdom	For J. Noble.
Unknown date	Mandalena	Merchantman	John M. & William Gales	Sunderland	United Kingdom	For Thomas Cockerill.
Unknown date	Mersey	Paddle steamer			United Kingdom	For City of Dublin Steam Packet Company.
Unknown date	Nereus	Merchantman	Philip Laing	Sunderland	United Kingdom	For Philip Laing.
Unknown date	Nimrod	Brig	R. & A. Carsewell	Greenock	United Kingdom	For private owner.
Unknown date	Ocean	Snow		Sunderland	United Kingdom	For Skee & Co.
Unknown date	Pollux	Sixth rate		Rotterdam	Netherlands	For Royal Netherlands Navy.
Unknown date	Osprey	Snow		Sunderland	United Kingdom	For T. B. Simey.
Unknown date	Security	Merchantman		Yarmouth	(United Kingdom of Great Britain and Ireland) Upper Canada	For Mr. Spencer.
Unknown date	Simon Taylor	Barque		Blackwall Yard	United Kingdom	For S. Taylor.
Unknown date	Sisters	Barque	John M. & William Gales	Sunderland	United Kingdom	For William Gales.
Unknown date	Tamerlane	Merchantman		St. Martins	(United Kingdom of Great Britain and Ireland) Upper Canada	For Stewart & Co.
Unknown date	Triton	Merchantman	L. Crown	Sunderland	United Kingdom	For private owner.
Unknown date	Valk	Full-rigged ship		Rotterdam	Netherlands	For Royal Netherlands Navy.
Unknown date	Waterloo	Third rate			Netherlands	For Royal Netherlands Navy.
Unknown date	William Salthouse	Barque	Salthouse & Co.	Liverpool	United Kingdom	For Salthouse & Co.
Unknown date	Zephyr	Schooner	Frederick Baddeley	Brixham	United Kingdom	For John C. Baddeley & Frederick Baddeley.
