= Marquis of Lansdown (ship) =

Several vessels have been named Marquis of Lansdown for the Marquess of Lansdowne:

- Marquis of Lansdown (1787 ship) was launched in 1787 as an East Indiaman. She made six voyages as an "extra" ship for the British East India Company (EIC) before the EIC declared her worn out. Her owners sold her in 1800 and she became a West Indiaman. The French captured her in 1805 when they captured Dominica.
- Marquis of Lansdown (1824 ship) was launched at Calcutta in 1824. She was initially a "country ship", trading east of the Cape of Good Hope. She then sailed to Port Jackson, but plans to establish a packet service between Australia and Calcutta, including taking tea from India to Australia under a licence from the British East India Company (EIC), did not work out. She then sailed to England and became a whaler, making four voyages to the British southern whale fishery between 1829 and 1845. She was last listed in 1847.
