= Nyhavn 6 =

Listed building in Copenhagen

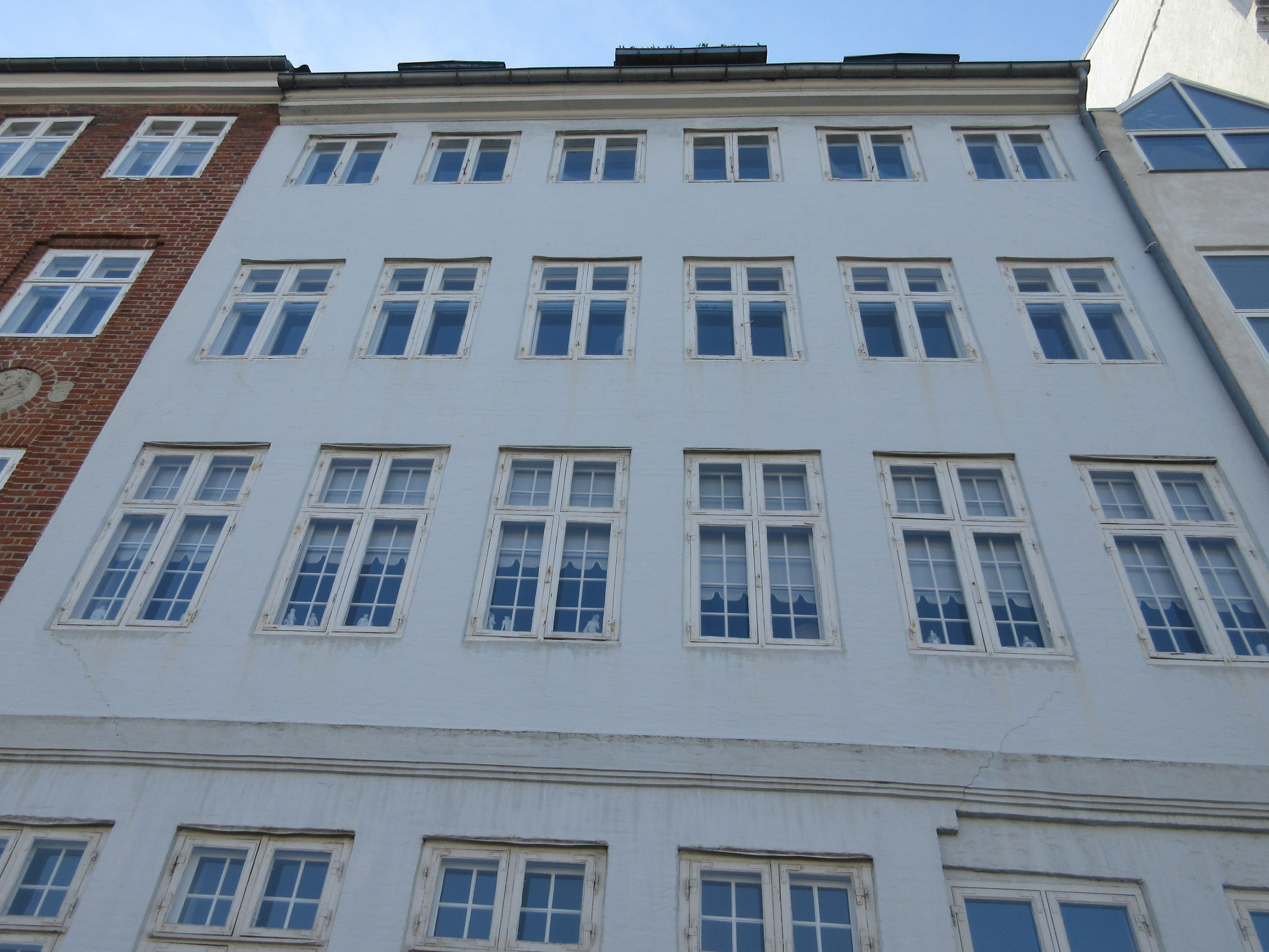
- Interactive map of the Nyhavn 6 area

General information
- Location: Copenhagen, Denmark
- Coordinates: 55°40′47.42″N 12°35′21.55″E
- Completed: 1762
- Renovated: 1728/1849 (heightened), 1963

Nyhavn 6 is a Neoclassical building situated on the quiet southern side of the Nyhavn canal in central Copenhagen, Denmark. It was listed in the Danish registry of protected buildings and places in 1950. Composer Carl Nielsen and sculptor Anne Marie Carl-Nielsen had their first home together in the garret in the 1890s.

== History ==
=== Early history ===
The site was originally part of Ulrik Frederik Gyldenløve's large property at the corner of Kongens Nytorv and Nyhavn. In Copenhagen's first cadastre from 1689 it was listed as No. 54 in St. Ann's East Quarter. The property was later ceded to dowager queen Charlotte Amalie. A narrow strip of land along the canal, from Charlottenborg to Møntgade (now part of Holbergsgade), was used for the construction of a row of very small, identical houses for low-ranking officials at the dowager queen's court. The houses were given numbers from 3 to 21.

House No. 5 (now Nyhavn 6) was listed in the new cadastre of 1756 as No. 277 in St. Ann's East Quarter.

=== Jacob Christensen and the new building ===
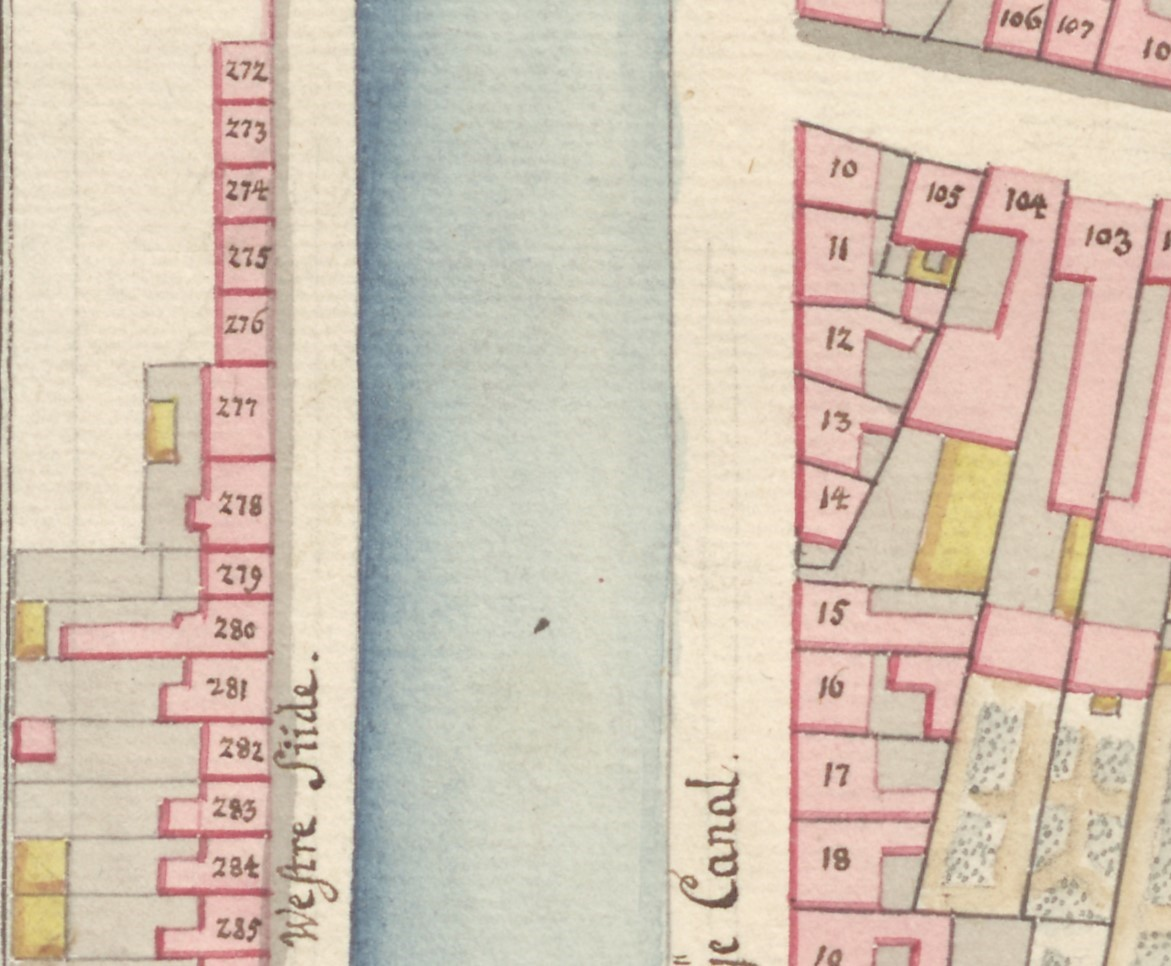
No. 278 seen in a detail from Christian Gedde's map of St. Ann's East Quarter, 1757

In 1770, it was decided to sell the houses at auction. The aim was to have them replaced by taller buildings that matched the houses on the other side of the canal and were more suitable for a location next to Kongens Nytorv.

Already before the auction took place, by royal deed of 7 January 1771 (registered 21 May), No. 277 (aka House No. 5) was sold for 292 rigsdaler and 48 skilling to distiller Jacob Christensen. The present building on the site was constructed for him in 1774–76.

Jacob Christensen was the father of bookseller, writer and publisher Kristen Kristensen (née Christensen Christensen, 1777–1849). He is best known for publishing the popular weekly magazine Politibennen (1816–1842).

=== 1800–1880 ===
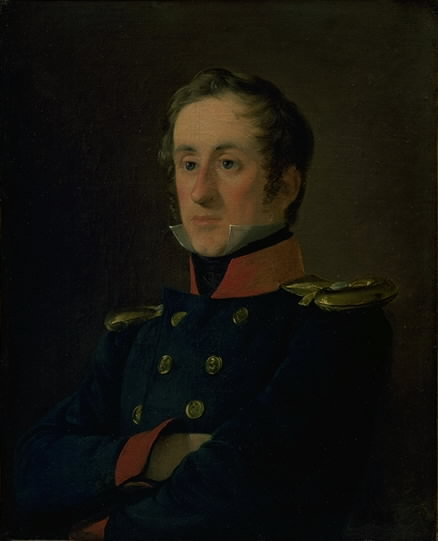
Emil Normann, painted by Jørgen Roed in 1830

The property was listed in the new cadastre of 1806 as No. 273 in the Eastern Quarter. It belonged to distiller Niels Møller at that time.

The naval officer and painter Emil Normann resided in one of the apartments in the building in the mid-1830s. He had just returned to Copenhagen after being stationed at Christiansø. He had now been transferred to service on the guardship Møn in Øresund. Normann was a student of C. W. Rckersberg. in 1834, he and Rckersberg sailed around Zealand on the maiden voyage of the Dronning Marie. Normann and his family left Nyhavn No. 273 in January 1838 after being appointed as enrolment officer in Tönning, Schleswig.

=== 1880 census ===
The property was home to 52 residents in nine households at the 1880 census. Charles Chr Theodor Falkenberg, a retailer, resided on the ground floor with his wife Lovisa Dorothea Falkenberg, their five children (aged zero to six) and one maid. Hans Petersen, a haulier, resided on the first floor with his wife Ane Petersen and their three children (aged 17 to 23). The son Peter Gans Petersen was a student at the Royal Danish Academy of Fine Arts, located less than a hundred metres away at Charlottenborg. Carl Vilhelm Auener, a typographer, resided on the second floor with his wife Marie Kirstine Auener, two daughters (aged 24 and 26), typographer Holger Cark Edvard Auener and the latter's two sons (aged 12 and 15). Maren Jensen, an unmarried woman with a pension, resided on the third floor with six lodgers (three shoemakers, two workmen and a clerk). Svend Olsen, a barkeeper, resided in the basement with his wife Julie Olsen, their two sons (aged seven and 11) and one maid. Morten Jørgensen, a favnsætter, resided on the ground floor of the cross wing with his wife Ulrika Jørgensen (née Rasmussen), their two children (aged eight and 11) and the 17-year-old lithographer's apprentice Jems Albert Andersen. Peter Andersen, another favnsætter, resided on the same floor with his wife Karen Marie Andersen (née Nielsen). Christiane Louise Rasmussen, a laundry woman (widow), resided on the first floor of the cross wing with two daughters (aged 32 and 37), a son (aged 30), a daughter-in-law (aged 20), a maid and a lodger (tailor). Adam Sinjen, an engineer (maskinbygger), resided on the second floor of the cross wing with his wife Inger Sinjen, their two daughters (aged 12 and 20) and two elderly women.

=== Later history ===
The composer Carl Nielsen and sculptor Anne Marie Carl-Nielsen resided in the fourth-floor apartment from 1891 to 1896.

The architect Nils Fagerholt (born 1933) undertook a comprehensive renovation of the building in 1992. The renovation received a diploma from Copenhagen Municipality in 1993.

== Architecture ==
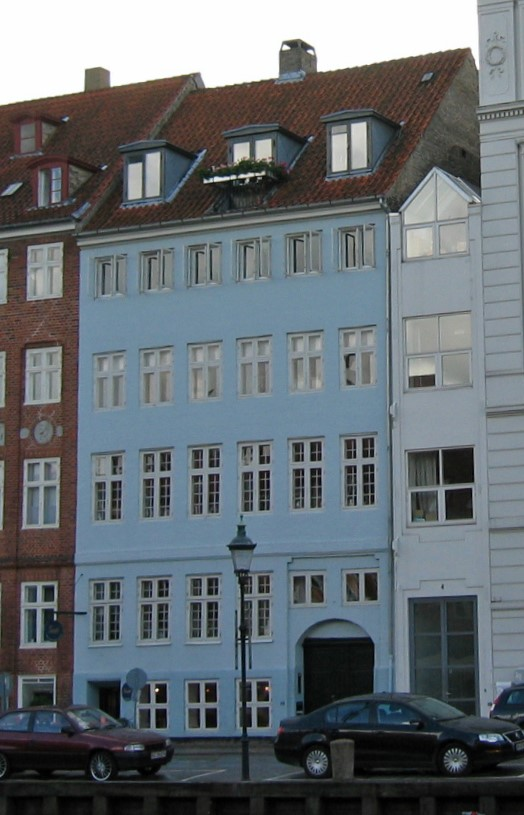
Nyhavn 6, viewed from the other side of the canal

Nyhavn 6 is a six-bays-wide building constructed with four storeys over a walk-out basement. The fourth floor was added in two stages, first towards the street in 1829 and then towards the courtyard in 1849. A gateway is located in the two bays fzrthest to the west (right). The building has a pitched roof clad in black tiles. The roof ridge is pierced by a chimney. A long side wing extends from the rear side of the building along the east side of the first of two narrow, consecutive courtyards. A four-storey cross wing separates the two courtyards from each other. A rear wing is located at the far end of the second courtyard. The front wing was listed on the Danish registry of protected buildings and places in 1979. The side wing, cross wing and rear wing are not part of the heritage listing.

== Today ==
Nyhavn 5 is divided into condominiums. It is jointly owned by the owners via E/F Nyhavn 6 A-B.
