= List of shipwrecks in March 1827 =

The list of shipwrecks in March 1827 includes some ships sunk, wrecked or otherwise lost during March 1827.

== 1 March ==
List of shipwrecks: 1 March 1827
Ship	State	Description
Comet	United Kingdom	The ship struck the Haisborough Sands or a sunken wreck off them and foundered in the North Sea off the coast of Norfolk. All on board were rescued, She was on a voyage from London to Leith, Lothian.
Constantine	United Kingdom	The ship was wrecked on the Trinity Sand, in the North Sea. Her crew were rescued. She was on a voyage from North Shields, County Durham to London.
Flora	France	The ship was driven ashore at Dymchurch, Kent, United Kingdom.
Hampshire	United Kingdom	The ship ran aground on the Haisborough Sands She was refloated but consequently foundered. Her crew survived.
Hythe	United Kingdom	The ship was wrecked on the Trinity Sand. her crew were rescued. She was on a voyage from Sunderland, County Durham to London.
Industria	Spain	The ship was wrecked on Sal, Cape Verde Islands, Portugal. All on board were rescued. She was on a voyage from Lanzarote to Maldonado, Uruguay.
Industry	United Kingdom	The ship was wrecked on the Goswick Sands, in the North Sea off the coast of Northumberland. She was on a voyage from Inverkeithing, Fife to London.
Prosperity	United Kingdom	The ship was wrecked at Blyth, Northumberland with the loss of seven of her eight crew. The survivor was rescued by the Blyth Lifeboat. She was on a voyage from Sunderland to London.
Speculation	United Kingdom	The ship was wrecked on the coast of the Isle of Wight. She was on a voyage from Faro, Portugal to London.

== 2 March ==
List of shipwrecks: 2 March 1827
Ship	State	Description
Bélisaire	France	The ship was driven ashore and wrecked near Rye, Sussex, United Kingdom. She was on a voyage from Sète, Hérault to Dunkirk, Nord.
Comet	United Kingdom	The ship was wrecked at Carmarthen. Her crew were rescued.
Jamaica	United Kingdom	The ship was driven ashore and wrecked at Goswick, Northumberland.
Manchester	United Kingdom	The transport ship was driven ashore and wrecked north of Viana do Castelo, Portugal. All on board survived

== 3 March ==
List of shipwrecks: 3 March 1827
Ship	State	Description
Ann	United Kingdom	The schooner was wrecked in Belfast Lough with the loss of all five people on board. She was on a voyage from Dundalk, County Louth to Irvine, Ayrshire.
Acorn	United Kingdom	The brig was driven ashore and wrecked at Eyemouth, Berwickshire. Her crew were rescued. She was on a voyage from Southampton, Hampshire to Montrose, Forfarshire.
Betsy	United Kingdom	The brig was driven ashore and wrecked on the Isle of Arran. Her crew were rescued.
Diana	United Kingdom	The sloop was driven ashore and wrecked on the Isle of Arran. Her crew were rescued.
Eliza	United Kingdom	The sloop was wrecked on the coast of County Antrim with the loss of all hands.
Fame	United Kingdom	The ship was driven ashore at Eyemouth. Her crew were rescued.
Glasgow	United Kingdom	The ship was wrecked on the Clachan Rocks, off the Isle of Arran. Her crew were rescued.
Hero	United Kingdom	The sloop was driven ashore and wrecked in Loch Ryan, near Newton. Her crew were rescued. She was on a voyage from Stranraer, Wigtownshire to Ayr.
Jabez	United Kingdom	The ship was driven ashore at North Berwick, Berwickshire. Her crew were rescued.
John Joyce	United Kingdom	The ship was wrecked in Belfast Lough.
Marcellus or Marseilles	United Kingdom	The schooner was driven ashore and wrecked on the coast of County Antrim with the loss of a crew member. She was on a voyage from Belfast, County Antrim to Irvine.
Margaret	United Kingdom	The ship was wrecked in Belfast Lough.
Sarah	United Kingdom	The ship was driven ashore and wrecked at St Abb's Head, Berwickshire with the loss of all hands.
Union	United Kingdom	The ship was driven ashore at Eyemouth. Her crew were rescued. She was on a voyage from Banff, Aberdeenshire to London.
Woods	United Kingdom	The ship was wrecked at Larne, County Antrim with the loss of all hands.

== 4 March ==
List of shipwrecks: 4 March 1827
Ship	State	Description
Ann	United Kingdom	The smack was driven ashore and wrecked on Lindisfarne, Northumberland with the loss of three of the six people on board. The survivors were rescued by rocket apparatus.
Britain	United Kingdom	The ship sprang a leak and foundered in the North Sea off Hartlepool, County Durham. Her crew survived.
Eliza	United Kingdom	The ship was driven ashore and wrecked at Larne, County Antrim.
Henry	United Kingdom	The ship was wrecked on The Mewstone, in the English Channel off the coast of Devon with the loss of a crew member. She was on a voyage from Livorno, Kingdom of Sardinia to London.
Janet	United Kingdom	The ship was driven ashore and wrecked at Crawfordsburn, County Antrim with the loss of all hands.
Liberty	United Kingdom	The ship was lost in the North Sea off the coast of Essex whilst assinting in the salvage of cargo from Samaritan (United Kingdom).
Luna	United Kingdom	The sloop was driven ashore near Bangor, County Down. Her crew survived. She was on a voyage from Liverpool, Lancashire to Leith, Lothian.
Mary	United Kingdom	The ship was driven ashore and severely damaged at Thorntonloch, Lothian. Her crew were rescued.
Manilla	United Kingdom	The brig was driven ashore at Glenarm, County Antrim. She was on a voyage from Belfast, County Antrim to Ayr.
Pursuit	United Kingdom	The brig was driven ashore and wrecked at Warkworth, Northumberland. Her crew were rescued. She was on a voyage from Great Yarmouth, Norfolk to Leith, Lothian.
Samaritan	United Kingdom	The ship was wrecked on the Gunfleet Sand, in the North Sea off the coast of Essex. Her crew were rescued.
Sarah Ann	(United Kingdom of Great Britain and Ireland) British North America	The brig was driven ashore and wrecked near Girvan, Ayrshire. She was on a voyage from Saint John, New Brunswick to the Clyde.

== 6 March ==
List of shipwrecks: 6 March 1827
Ship	State	Description
Airthy Castle	United Kingdom	The ship was driven ashore at Kilrush, County Antrim.
Hope	United Kingdom	The schooner was wrecked on the Goodwin Sands, Kent with the loss of one of her five crew. Survivors were rescued by the Deal boat Mariner (United Kingdom).
Soho	United Kingdom	The ship ran aground on the Cross Sand, off the coast of Norfolk and was abandoned by her crew. She was on a voyage from New York, United States to London.
Zeno	United Kingdom	The ship was driven ashore at "Malby".

== 7 March ==
List of shipwrecks: 7 March 1827
Ship	State	Description
Amelia	United Kingdom	The ship was driven ashore on the Mull of Galloway, Wigtownshire whilst on a voyage from Campbeltown, Argyllshire to Lancaster, Lancashire. She had been refloated by 31 March.
Duquesa de Goyas	Imperial Brazilian Navy	Cisplatine War: The corvette was wrecked in the River Plate at Carmen de Patagones, Argentina with the loss of 35–40 of her crew.
Elizabeth and Hannah	United Kingdom	The ship ran aground and was wrecked on the Crow Rock, in the Irish Sea off Milford Haven, Pembrokeshire. Her crew were rescued. She was on a voyage from Hayle, Cornwall to Llanelli, Glamorgan.
Fame	United Kingdom	The sloop was driven ashore and wrecked at Walberswick, Suffolk. Her crew were rescued.
Hope	United Kingdom	The ship was wrecked in St Brides Bay. Her crew were rescued. She was on a voyage from Newport, Monmouthshire to Pembroke.
ARA Independencia	Argentine Navy	Cisplatine War: The brig ran aground in the River Plate at Ensenada, Buenos Aires. She was subsequently burnt to prevent her capture by the Brazilian Navy. Her crew were rescued by the schooner ARA Sarandí (Argentine Navy).
James	United Kingdom	The ship was wrecked at Cullercoats, Northumberland with the loss of a crew member. She was on a voyage from Dunbar, Lothian to Newcastle upon Tyne, Northumberland.
ARA República	Argentine Navy	Cisplatine War: The brig ran aground in the River Plate near Ensenada. She was subsequently destroyed by Brazilian Navy ships with the loss of 63 of her crew.
Sisters	United Kingdom	The brig was wrecked on the Whitaker Spit, in the North Sea. Her crew were rescued.
Union	United Kingdom	The ship foundered in the North Sea off the mouth of the Humber. Her crew were rescued. She was on a voyage from King's Lynn, Norfolk to Newcastle upon Tyne, Northumberland.
William	United Kingdom	The ship was driven ashore near Ramsey, Isle of Man. She was on a voyage from Ulverston, Lancashire to Glasgow, Renfrewshire.

== 8 March ==
List of shipwrecks: 8 March 1827
Ship	State	Description
Alert	United Kingdom	The brig was driven ashore at Berwick-upon-Tweed, Northumberland. Her crew were rescued. She was on a voyage from Sunderland, County Durham to Aberdeen.
Alexander	United Kingdom	The schooner was driven ashore and wrecked at Coldingham, Berwickshire with the loss of two of her four crew. She was on a voyage from Newcastle upon Tyne, Northumberland to Perth.
Allice	United Kingdom	The sloop was driven ashore and wrecked at Elliot, Forfarshire with the loss of two of her three crew. She was on a voyage from Sunderland to Perth.
Anne	United Kingdom	The ship was driven ashore at Sunderland, County Durham. Her crew were rescued. She was on a voyage from Leith, Lothian to Rotterdam, South Holland, Netherlands.
Betsy and Mary	United Kingdom	The brig was wrecked on the Boulmer Rocks, in the North Sea off the coast of Northumberland. Her crew were rescued.
Bermuda	United Kingdom	The ship was driven ashore at Spittal, Northumberland. Her crew were rescued by rocket apparatus. She was on a voyage from South Shields, County Durham to London. Bermuda was subsequently destroyed by fire.
Brothers	United Kingdom	The ship was driven ashore near Dunbar, Lothian with the loss of all but her captain.
Eliza	United Kingdom	The schooner was driven ashore and wrecked. Her crew were rescued. She was on a voyage from Sunderland to Portsoy, Aberdeenshire.
Fame	United Kingdom	The sloop was driven ashore at Eyemouth. Her crew were rescued.
Fly	United Kingdom	The brig was wrecked on the Boulmer Rocks. Her crew were rescued.
Industry	United Kingdom	The sloop was driven ashore and wrecked at East Wemyss, Fife with the loss of two of her five crew. She was on a voyage from Montrose, Forfarshire to Newcastle upon Tyne, Northumberland.
Jamaica	United Kingdom	The sloop was driven ashore and wrecked at Spittal with the loss of three of the five people on board. She was on a voyage from Stockton-on-Tees, County Durham to Aberdeen.
James	United Kingdom	The ship was wrecked at Cullercoats, Northumberland with the loss of a crew member. She was on a voyage from Warren, Pembrokeshire to Sunderland.
Janet	United Kingdom	The sloop was driven ashore on the Peffer Sands, Lothian. Her crew were rescued. She was on a voyage from Sunderland to Banff, Aberdeenshire. Janet was refloated on 10 March and taken in to Dunbar.
Major	United Kingdom	The ship was wrecked on the Newton Rocks, in the North Sea off the coast of Northumberland. There were no survivors.
Maria	United Kingdom	The ship was driven ashore at North Sunderland, County Durham. Her crew were rescued. She was on a voyage from Leith to Rotterdam.
Mary	United Kingdom	The ship was driven ashore and wrecked. Her crew were rescued.
Oporto	United Kingdom	The ship foundered in the Atlantic Ocean off Viana do Castelo, Portugal with the loss of nine lives. She was on a voyage from London to Porto, Portugal.
Ossian	United Kingdom	The schooner was wrecked on the Bondicar Rocks, in the North Sea off the coast of Northumberland. Her crew were rescued.
Sarah	United Kingdom	The ship was driven ashore near Belfast, County Antrim. Her crew were rescued. She was on a voyage from Messina, Sicily to Belfast.
Stag	United Kingdom	The sloop was driven ashore and wrecked at Gullane Point, Lothian with the loss of all hands. She was on a voyage from Portsoy, Aberdeenshire to Leith, Lothian.
Thomas and Nancy	United Kingdom	The sloop was driven ashore and wrecked at East Wemyss with the loss of all three crew. She was on a voyage from West Wemyss, Fife to the Moray Firth.
Totness	United Kingdom	The ship was driven ashore at Figuera, Portugal. She was burnt on 25 March.
Union	United Kingdom	The ship was driven ashore at Eyemouth. Her crew were rescued. She was on a voyage from Banff, Aberdeenshire to London. Union was later refloated.
William Tell	United Kingdom	The ship was driven ashore and wrecked south of St Abb's Head, Berwickshire with the loss of two of her crew.
Zealous	United Kingdom	The sloop was driven ashore and wrecked near Dunbar. Her crew were rescued. She was on a voyage from Dunbar to Berwick-upon-Tweed.

== 9 March ==
List of shipwrecks: 9 March 1827
Ship	State	Description
Farmer	United Kingdom	The ship was driven ashore and wrecked between Aberdour and Burntisland, Fife. Her crew were rescued.
Helen	United Kingdom	The sloop was in collision with another sloop off Dunbar, Lothian. She was subsequently driven ashore at Aberdour. All six of her crew survived. Helen was on a voyage from "Eisdale" to Newcastle upon Tyne, Northumberland.

== 10 March ==
List of shipwrecks: 10 March 1827
Ship	State	Description
Betsey	United Kingdom	The ship was wrecked at Dublin. Her crew were rescued.
Enterprise	United Kingdom	The ship was wrecked at Glenarm, County Antrim with the loss of all hands. She was on a voyage from Rio de Janeiro, Brazil to Liverpool, Lancashire.

== 11 March ==
List of shipwrecks: 11 March 1827
Ship	State	Description
Revnitel (Ревнитель, 'Zealot')	Imperial Russian Navy	The transport ship was driven ashore 15 nautical miles (28 km) north of Anapa. Her crew abandoned ship on 13 March. She was on a voyage from Sevastopol to Kerch. Subsequently refloated and repaired.
Pelican	United Kingdom	The ship foundered in the Irish Sea off Holyhead, Anglesey. Her crew were rescued. She was on a voyage from Bengal, India to London.
Three Sisters	United Kingdom	The brig was wrecked in Belfast Lough with the loss of a crew member.

== 13 March ==
List of shipwrecks: 13 March 1827
Ship	State	Description
Ebrington	United Kingdom	The ship foundered in the Irish Sea 10 leagues (30 nautical miles (56 km) north of the Smalls Lighthouse. Her crew were rescued by Ann and Margaret (United Kingdom). She was on a voyage from Dublin to Swansea, Glamorgan.

== 14 March ==
List of shipwrecks: 14 March 1827
Ship	State	Description
Elizabeth and Anne	United Kingdom	The schooner struck the Crow Rock, in the Irish Sea off Milford Haven, Pembrokeshire and foundered. Her crew were rescued. She was on a voyage from Hayle, Cornwall to Llanelli, Glamorgan.
Martha	United Kingdom	The ship ran aground on the Kentish Knock, in the North Sea off the coast of Kent. She was refloated but consequently foundered. Her crew were rescued. She was on a voyage from Newhaven, Sussex to Sunderland, County Durham.

== 15 March ==
List of shipwrecks: 15 March 1827
Ship	State	Description
Anne	United Kingdom	The schooner was driven ashore and wrecked near Dunstanburgh Castle, Northumberland. Her crew survived.
Dapper	United Kingdom	The ship was driven ashore at Bamburgh, Northumberland.
Dispatch	United Kingdom	The ship was driven ashore and wrecked near Dunstanburgh Castle. Her crew were rescued.
Goodwill	United Kingdom	The ship was driven ashore and wrecked near Boulogne, Pas-de-Calais, France. She was on a voyage from London to Falmouth, Cornwall.
Nancy	United Kingdom	The ship foundered in The Wash off King's Lynn, Norfolk. Her crew were rescued. She was on a voyage from Goole, Yorkshire to Sheerness, Kent.
Thomas	United Kingdom	The sloop was wrecked on the Culver Sands, in the Bristol Channel with the loss of all five people on board.
Wellington	United Kingdom	The ship was driven ashore at Formby, Lancashire. She was on a voyage from Limerick to Liverpool, Lancashire.

== 16 March ==
List of shipwrecks: 16 March 1827
Ship	State	Description
Lyre	United Kingdom	The ship was driven ashore and wrecked near Rosarno, Kingdom of the Two Sicilies with the loss of all but three of her crew. She was on a voyage from Naples, Kingdom of the Two Sicilies to Constantinople, Ottoman Empire.

== 17 March ==
List of shipwrecks: 17 March 1827
Ship	State	Description
Hirman	United Kingdom	The ship was driven ashore at Whitstable, Kent. She was on a voyage from Demerara to London.
Lord Nelson	United Kingdom	The ship was driven ashore and wrecked at Padstow, Cornwall. She was on a voyage from Neath, Glamorgan to Dartmouth, Devon.
Neptune	United Kingdom	The ship was driven ashore at Blakeney, Norfolk.
Palmyra	United States	The ship was wrecked off the mouth of the Scheldt. She was on a voyage from Charleston, South Carolina to Antwerp, Netherlands.
Vigilant	United Kingdom	The ship was driven ashore at Whitstable.
Westburn	United Kingdom	The ship foundered in the English Channel off Dungeness, Kent with the loss of all but one of her crew. The survivor was rescued by Vittoria (United Kingdom). Westburn was on a voyage from Sunderland, County Durham to Portsmouth, Hampshire.

== 18 March ==
List of shipwrecks: 18 March 1827
Ship	State	Description
George	Portugal	The ship was lost near Neuwerk, Hamburg. She was on a voyage from Lisbon to Hamburg.
George Corrna	Portugal	The ship was lost near Neuwerk. She was on a voyage from Lisbon to Hamburg.
Mary	United Kingdom	The ship was wrecked on South Uist, Outer Hebrides. Her crew were rescued.
Philip	United States	The ship was driven ashore on the coast of Friesland, Netherlands. She was on a voyage from Baltimore, Maryland to Amsterdam, North Holland, Netherlands.
Sappho	United Kingdom	The ship was driven ashore and severely damaged in the Dardanelles. She was on a voyage from London to Constantinople, Ottoman Empire.
William	United Kingdom	The ship foundered in the North Sea off North Somercotes, Lincolnshire. Her crew were rescued. She was on a voyage from London to Selby, Yorkshire.

== 19 March ==
List of shipwrecks: 19 March 1827
Ship	State	Description
Fair Hibernian	United Kingdom	The ship was driven ashore on Borkum, Kingdom of Hanover. Her crew were rescued. She was on a voyage from Newcastle upon Tyne, Northumberland to Hamburg.

== 20 March ==
List of shipwrecks: 20 March 1827
Ship	State	Description
Three Brothers	United Kingdom	The ship was driven ashore and wrecked at Oxwich Point, Glamorgan. Her crew were rescued. She was on a voyage from Hayle, Cornwall to Swansea, Glamorgan
Woodbine	United Kingdom	The ship was wrecked near Goree Island. Her crew were rescued. She was on a voyage from Teignmouth, Devon to Hamburg.

== 23 March ==
List of shipwrecks: 23 March 1827
Ship	State	Description
Commerce	United Kingdom	The ship caught fire at Peel, Isle of Man and was abandoned by her crew. She was obliterated when her cargo of gunpowder exploded.
Indian	United States	The ship was driven ashore near Saltcoats, Ayrshire, United Kingdom. She was on a voyage from Savannah, Georgia to the Clyde.

== 24 March ==
List of shipwrecks: 24 March 1827
Ship	State	Description
Ambiona	United Kingdom	The ship was driven ashore and wrecked on Bornholm, Denmark. Her crew ==were rescued. She was om a voyage from Montrose, Forfarshire to Memel, Prussia.
Brothers	United Kingdom	The ship was wrecked on the North Ground, in the North Sea. Her crew were rescued.
Eliza	United Kingdom	The ship foundered in the North Sea off Hogenes, Norway. Her crew were rescued. She was on a voyage from South Shields, County Durham to Memel, Prussia.
William and Mary	United Kingdom	The ship was lost on the West Hoyle Bank, in Liverpool Bay. She was on a voyage from Aberdyfi, Merionethshire to Liverpool, Lancashire.

== 27 March ==
List of shipwrecks: 27 March 1827
Ship	State	Description
Agnes	United Kingdom	The ship was driven ashore and wrecked near Galway. She was on a voyage from Galway to London.
Three Brothers	United Kingdom	The sloop ran aground near Oxwich Point, Glamorgan and was wrecked. her crew survived. She was on a voyage from Hayle, Cornwall to Swansea, Glamorgan.

== 29 March ==
List of shipwrecks: 29 March 1827
Ship	State	Description
Allies	United Kingdom	The ship was lodt on the Kentish Knock, in the North Sea. Her crew were rescued.
Baltic	United Kingdom	The ship foundered in the Irish Sea off Santon Head, Isle of Man with the loss of all hands. She was on a voyage from Workington, Cumberland to Dublin.
Union	United Kingdom	The ship was wrecked on the Trinity Sand, in the North Sea in late March. She was on a voyage from Great Yarmouth, Norfolk to Gainsborough, Lincolnshire.

== 30 March ==
List of shipwrecks: 30 March 1827
Ship	State	Description
Anna Dorothea	Hamburg	The ship was wrecked near Bayonne, Basses-Pyrénées, France. She was on a voyage from Bayonne to Altona, Hamburg.
Urania	United Kingdom	The ship ran aground on the Haisborough Sands and sank. Her crew were rescued.

== 31 March ==
List of shipwrecks: 31 March 1827
Ship	State	Description
Catherine	United Kingdom	The ship was wrecked near the Cordouan Lighthouse, Gironde, France. She was on a voyage from Newcastle upon Tyne, Northumberland to Bordeaux, Gironde.
Renown	United Kingdom	The ship foundered in the North Sea off Scarborough, Yorkshire. Her crew were rescued. Her crew were rescued. She was on a voyage from South Shields, County Durham to Whitby, Yorkshire.

== Unknown date ==
List of shipwrecks: Unknown date in March 1827
Ship	State	Description
Barbara and Ann	United Kingdom	The ship was beached near Holyhead, Anglesey after her cargo shifted. She was on a voyage from Youghal, County Cork to Liverpool, Lancashire.
Barnett	United States	The ship was driven ashore near Belfast, County Antrim, United Kingdom before 6 March. She was on a voyage from New Orleans, Louisiana to Liverpool.
Carl Kendrick	Kingdom of Hanover	The ship was driven ashore at Cuxhaven before 20 March. She was on a voyage from Rio de Janeiro, Brazil to Cuxhaven.
Clematis	United Kingdom	The ship was driven ashore at Tranmere, Cheshire.
Clyde	United Kingdom	The ship was wrecked on the Seven Brothers Reef, off Saint-Domingue.
Curlew	United States	The ship was driven ashore at Cuxhaven before 20 March. She was on a voyage from Boston, Massachusetts to Cuxhaven.
Defence	United Kingdom	The ship foundered in the Irish Sea off Ravenglass, Cumberland with the loss of all six crew.
Dotterel	United Kingdom New South Wales	The brig was wrecked in the Tamar River at Launceston, Van Diemen's Land.
Elizabeth	United Kingdom	The ship was wrecked near Belfast before 16 March. She was on a voyage from Dublin to Glasgow, Renfrewshire.
Enterprize	United States	The ship was driven ashore near Belfast before 6 March. She was on a voyage from New York to Liverpool.
Forêt	France	The ship was wrecked at Saint-Nicolas. She was on a voyage from Bordeaux, Gironde to Port-au-Prince, Haiti.
Isabella	United Kingdom	The sloop was lost in Carradale Bay. Her crew were rescued. She was on a voyage from Newry, County Antrim to Campbeltown, Argyllshire.
Java	Netherlands	The ship was wrecked on Walcheren, Zeeland with the loss of all eight passengers and 22 crew.
Jersey	United Kingdom	The brig was wrecked at Punta Sal, Spain. she was on a voyage from London to British Honduras.
Lovely Nelly	United Kingdom	The ship was driven ashore and wrecked at Black Comb, Cumberland with the loss of two of her crew. She was on a voyage from Campbeltown, Argyllshire to Preston, Lancashire.
Margery	United Kingdom	The ship foundered at sea before 17 March with the loss of all fourteen or fifteen crew.
Mary	United Kingdom	The ship was wrecked in the Bay of Strabragg. Her crew were rescued. She was on a voyage from Killala, County Mayo to Liverpool.
Navy	United Kingdom	The ship was driven ashore at "Knott's Hole".
Newport	United Kingdom	The ship was wrecked at Bristol, Gloucestershire in mid-March. She was on a voyage from Chepstow, Monmouthshire to Bristol.
Ocean	UKGBI	The ship was driven ashore and wrecked near Donaghadee, County Antrim. Her crew were rescued. She was on a voyage from Charleston, South Carolina, United States to Belfast.
Rosetta	United Kingdom	The ship was driven ashore at Cuxhaven before 20 March. She was on a voyage from Arica, Chile to Cuxhaven.
Sarah	United Kingdom	The brig was driven ashore and wrecked at "Petty Cove" with the loss of all hands.
Scotia	United Kingdom	The brig was driven ashore and wrecked at Carleton, Carlisle, Cumberland with the loss of all hands.
Trio	United Kingdom	The ship foundered in the Atlantic Ocean off Mizen Head, County Cork. She was on a voyage from Palermo, Sicily to Londonderry.
Wooda	United Kingdom	The brig was wrecked off Maryport, Cumberland with some loss of life.
