= Diana (1799 Topsham ship) =

History

Great Britain
- Name: Diana
- Launched: 1799, Topsham
- Fate: Wrecked 1802

General characteristics
- Tons burthen: 183 (bm)
- Armament: 16 × 6-pounder guns

Diana was launched in 1799 at Topsham as a West Indiaman. She was wrecked in 1802.

== Career ==
She was first listed in Lloyd's Register (LR) in 1799.

Year	Master	Owner	Trade	Source
1799	Backhouse	Dare&Co.	Exmouth–Liverpool	LR
1801	Backhouse; J.Williams	Dare&Co.	Liverpool–Demerara	LR

== Fate ==
Diana was wrecked in 1802.

As Marquis of Lansdown was returning to England from Jamaica, on 23 June 1802 she sighted a large vessel wrecked on the west end of the Isle of Pines. A sloop from the Grand Caymanes reported that the wrecked vessel was Diana, Williams, master, which had been sailing from Jamaica to Liverpool. A wrecker had visited Diana and salvaged 100 pipes of Madeira wine, which she had taken to Caymanes. Captain Williams had died after leaving Jamaica.
