= List of shipwrecks in February 1829 =

The list of shipwrecks in February 1829 includes some ships sunk, wrecked or otherwise lost during February 1829.

== 2 February ==
List of shipwrecks: 2 February 1829
Ship	State	Description
Lucies	Austrian Empire	The ship was wrecked at Brindisi, Kingdom of the Two Sicilies with the loss of five of her crew. She was on a voyage from Trieste to Hamburg.

== 3 February ==
List of shipwrecks: 3 February 1829
Ship	State	Description
Delight	(United Kingdom of Great Britain and Ireland) British North America	The ship was driven ashore at Belmullet, County Mayo, United Kingdom.

== 5 February ==
List of shipwrecks: 5 February 1829
Ship	State	Description
Standard	United Kingdom	The ship ran aground on the Goodwin Sands, Kent and was abandoned by her crew. She was later refloated and taken in to The Downs. Standard was on a voyage from Dundee, Forfarshire to New York, United States.
Wellington	(United Kingdom of Great Britain and Ireland) Tobago	The ship was wrecked on a reef north of "Taxardo". Her crew were rescued. She was on a voyage from Tobago to Puerto Rico

== 7 February ==
List of shipwrecks: 7 February 1829
Ship	State	Description
Janus	United States	The ship was abandoned in the Atlantic Ocean. She was on a voyage from Boston, Massachusetts to Rotterdam, South Holland, Netherlands.

== 8 February ==
List of shipwrecks: 8 February 1829
Ship	State	Description
Christopher Scott	United States	The ship was lost on Grand Cayman Island. She was on a voyage from London, United Kingdom to Mobile, Alabama.
Darius	United Kingdom	The ship departed from Mauritius for London. No further trace, presumed foundered with the loss of all hands.
Strenshall	United Kingdom	The ship departed from Mauritius for London. No further trace, presumed foundered with the loss of all hands.

== 9 February ==
List of shipwrecks: 9 February 1829
Ship	State	Description
Lese	France	The ship foundered off Île Bourbon.
Reparateur	France	The ship foundered off Île Bourbon.

== 11 February ==
List of shipwrecks: 11 February 1829
Ship	State	Description
Ann	United Kingdom	The ship was driven ashore and wrecked near Cardiff, Glamorgan. She was on a voyage from Newport, Monmouthshire to an Irish port.
Industry	United Kingdom	The ship was wrecked on Isla Aves, Dominica. Her crew were rescued. She was on a voyage from Greenock, Renfrewshire to Maracaibo, Venezuela.

== 13 February ==
List of shipwrecks: 13 February 1829
Ship	State	Description
Deux Auguste	France	The ship foundered in the Atlantic Ocean off Lisbon, Portugal with the loss of a crew member. Survivors were rescued by a Portuguese vessel.
Woodford	United Kingdom	The ship foundered off Madagascar with the loss of four lives. Survivors took to the boats and were rescued on 16 February by Scipio (United Kingdom) Woodford was on a voyage from Calcutta, India to Saint Helena.

== 15 February ==
List of shipwrecks: 15 February 1829
Ship	State	Description
HMS Nightingale	Royal Navy	The schooner was wrecked on The Shingles, in The Solent off Yarmouth, Isle of Wight.
Nancy	United Kingdom	The sloop collided with Ruby (United Kingdom) in the North Sea off Tynemouth Castle, County Durham and foundered. Her crew were rescued by Ruby. Nancy was on a voyage from Sunderland to South Shields, County Durham.

== 17 February ==
List of shipwrecks: 17 February 1829
Ship	State	Description
New Venus	United Kingdom	The ship was in collision with Duke of York (United Kingdom) and foundered in the English Channel off Portland, Dorset with the loss of three of her crew.

== 21 February ==
List of shipwrecks: 21 February 1829
Ship	State	Description
John & William	United Kingdom	The ship was in collision with another vessel in the North Sea and was consequently beached at Grimsby, Lincolnshire. She was on a voyage from Sunderland, County Durham to Poole, Dorset.
Ringdove	United Kingdom	The ship struck The Manacles, Cornwall and foundered with the loss of eleven of her fourteen crew. She was on a voyage from Falmouth, Cornwall to Swansea, Glamorgan.

== 22 February ==
List of shipwrecks: 22 February 1829
Ship	State	Description
Atlantic	United States	A pirate schooner captured the brig off Point Yaco; the pirates murdered all but one of her crew. She subsequently foundered 3 nautical miles (5.6 km) off Point Yaco. Atlantic was on a voyage from Havana, Cuba to Boston, Massachusetts.

== 23 February ==
List of shipwrecks: 23 February 1829
Ship	State	Description
Eliza	United Kingdom	The ship was driven ashore and wrecked. She was on a voyage from London to Ostend, West Flanders, Netherlands.

== 25 February ==
List of shipwrecks: 25 February 1829
Ship	State	Description
Helen McGregor	United States	During a voyage from New Orleans, Louisiana, to Nashville, Tennessee, the steamboat was destroyed on the Mississippi River at Memphis, Tennessee, when her boilers exploded. Between 50 and 100 people on board were killed or injured.

== 26 February ==
List of shipwrecks: 26 February 1829
Ship	State	Description
Eliza Ann	United States	The ship was wrecked on Nantucket Island, Massachusetts. She was on a voyage from Palermo, Sicily to Boston, Massachusetts.

== 27 February ==
List of shipwrecks: 27 February 1829
Ship	State	Description
Dart	United Kingdom	The ship was wrecked near Blyth, Northumberland. Her crew were rescued. She was on a voyage from Newcastle upon Tyne, Northumberland to Kristiansand, Norway.
Egide	France	The ship foundered in the Atlantic Ocean. Her crew were rescued by Montano (France). She was on a voyage from Charleston, South Carolina, United States to Havre de Grâce, Seine Maritime.
Industry	(United Kingdom of Great Britain and Ireland) Jamaica	The ship was driven ashore and wrecked at Saint Andrews, Fife.
Industry	United Kingdom	The snow was wrecked at Campo Bello, New Brunswick, British North America.

== 28 February ==
List of shipwrecks: 28 February 1829
Ship	State	Description
Endymion	United Kingdom	The ship was driven ashore and sank at Sea Palling, Norfolk. Her crew were rescued.
Perseverance	United Kingdom	The ship was wrecked on Narsapoer Point. Her crew were rescued. She was on a voyage from Calcutta, India to London.

== Unknown date ==
List of shipwrecks: Unknown date 1829
Ship	State	Description
Armonia	United Kingdom	The ship was wrecked in the Dardanelles before 25 February. She was on a voyage from Smyrna to Constantinople, Ottoman Empire.
Finisterre	France)	The ship was wrecked at Brest, Finistère before 3 February.
George	United Kingdom	The trow was lost on the Dun Sand, in the River Severn with the loss of four lives.
Good Intent	(United Kingdom of Great Britain and Ireland) Cape Colony	The ship was wrecked near Deloga Bay.
Julia	United Kingdom	The ship was wrecked near "Point Demont". She was on a voyage from Quebec City, Lower Canada, British North America to Jamaica.
L'Aurore	France	The ship was wrecked near L'Orient, Morbihan. Her crew were rescued. She was on a voyage from Bordeaux, Gironde to Liverpool, Lancashire, United Kingdom.
Little Cherub	United States	The ship foundered in the Atlantic Ocean (44°00′N 39°30′W). Her crew were rescued by Plato (United States).
Maria Charlotte	United Kingdom	The ship was driven ashore and wrecked at Scarborough, Yorkshire. Her crew were rescued.
