= Emil Normann =

Danish painter and naval officer

Emil Wilhelm Normann
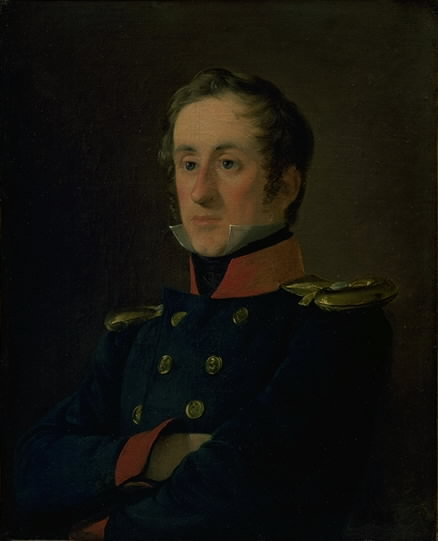
- Emil Wilhelm Normann', portrait by Jørgen Roed (1830)
- Born: 18 December 1798; Copenhagen, Denmark
- Died: 21 June 1881 (aged 91); Copenhagen, Denmark
- Education: Royal Danish Academy of Fine Arts
- Known for: Painting

Emil Wilhelm Normann (18 December 1798 – 21 June 1881) was a Danish painter and naval officer.

== Biography ==
Normann, who initially developed his painting abilities through his own resources, became a student in Christoffer Wilhelm Eckersberg's private school in 1825. Despite numerous interruptions including two voyages to the West Indies in 1823 and 1830, Normann and Eckersberg kept in touch. Indeed, it was Normann's corvette that Eckersberg painted in 1827 and in 1834, as they were sailing around Zealand on the maiden voyage of the "Dronning Marie", the two went off in a rowing boat to paint the vessel in the Great Belt. Normann continued to study marine painting as a component of his education as an officer, learning to distinguish between the manoeuvres of the various types of ship. Thanks to his friendship with Eckersberg, he established close contacts with Martinus Rørbye, Fritz Petzholdt and Adam Müller. Rørbye painted his portrait in 1830. Normann did not sell his paintings but either gave them away or kept them for himself. Eckersberg had ten of Normann's paintings in his home.

== Selected works ==
- Udsigt på Elben ved Altona (1829)
- Slaget på Rheden den 2. April 1801 (1830)
- Sejlskibe udenfor en havn, i forgrunden fæstningsværk med kanoner (1832)
- Kanonbåden Delphinens ankomst til Christiansø (1834)
- Linieskibet Skjold sejler ud i renden, hvor korvetten Najaden ligger til ankers (1837)
- Slaget ved Øland den 1ste Juni 1676 (1840)
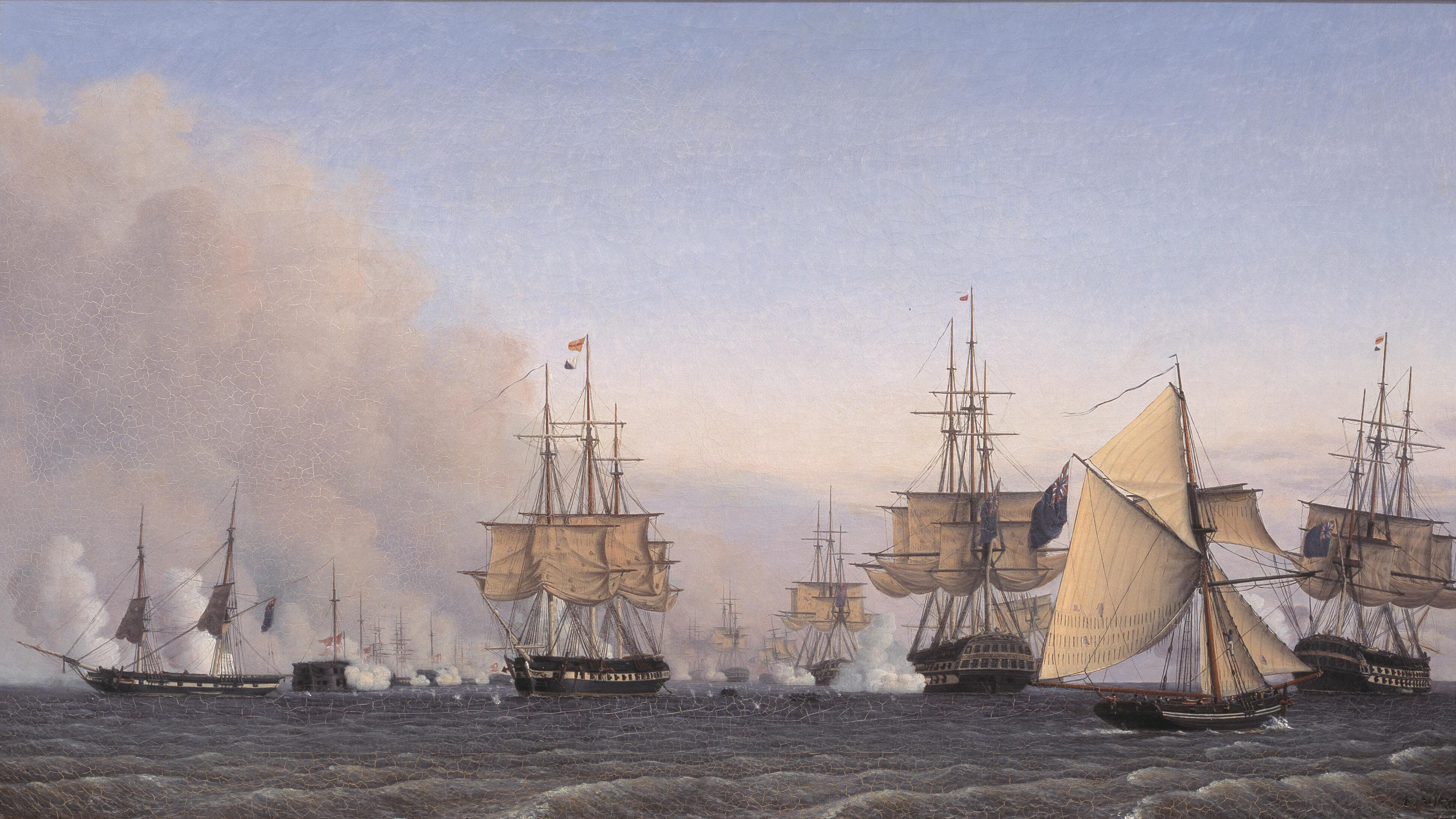
Slaget på Rheden (c. 1830)

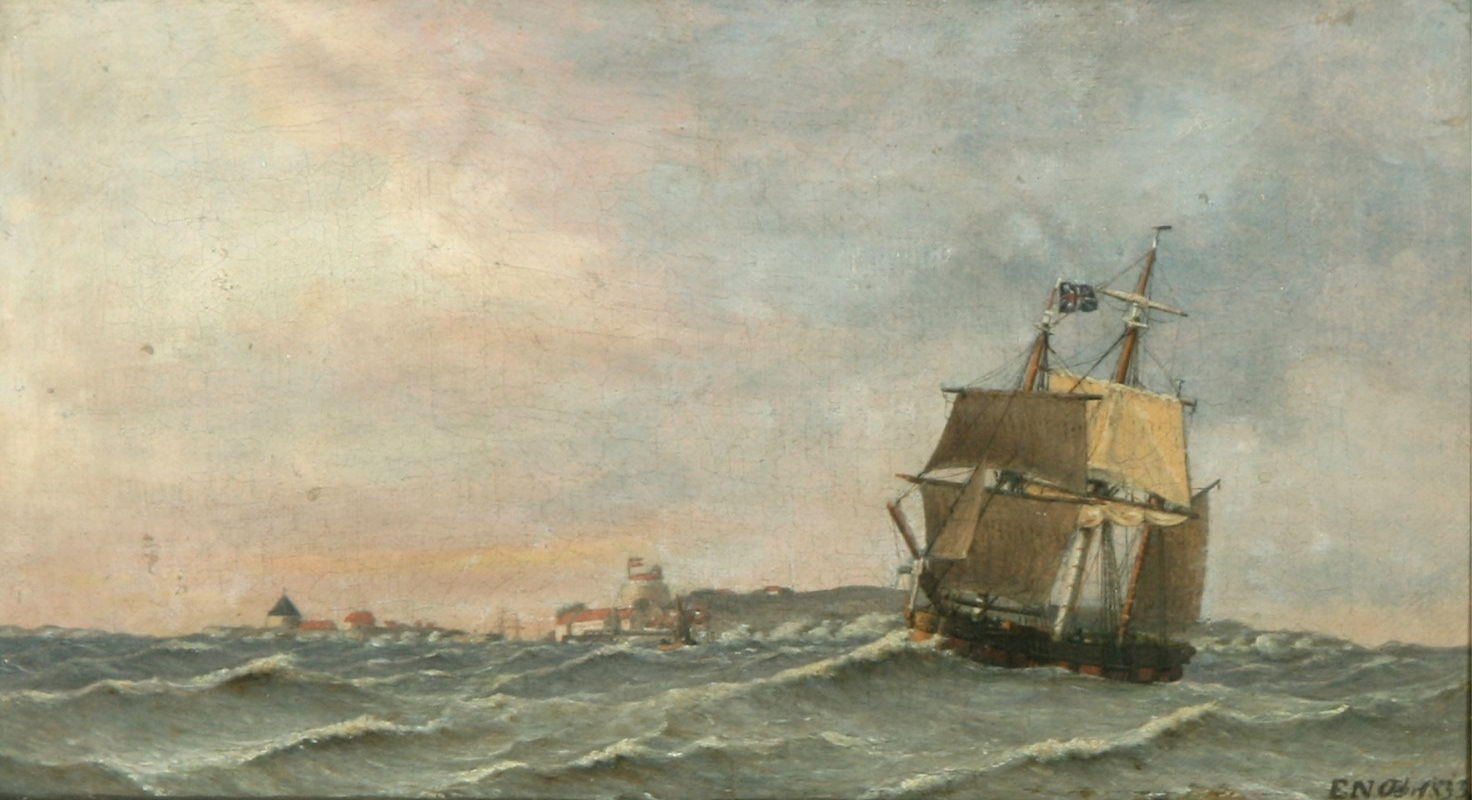
En engelsk bark langs kysten af Christians ø
