= Tamerlane (1824 ship) =

British merchant vessel

History

United Kingdom
- Name: Tamerlane
- Namesake: Tamerlane
- Builder: St. Martins, New Brunswick
- Launched: 1824
- Fate: Abandoned 26 February 1848

General characteristics
- Tons burthen: 384, or 390 (bm)

Tamerlane was launched in New Brunswick in 1824. She transferred her registry to Liverpool. She sailed between Scotland and Canada and then in 1828 sailed to India under a license from the British East India Company (EIC). After two voyages to India she returned to trading in the Western hemisphere. Her crew abandoned her in the Channel on 26 February 1848.

== Career ==
Tamerlane, Corfield, from St John, New Brunswick, arrived at Cork on 22 October 1824. She was driven on shore on 26 October at Jackson's Dam, Liverpool during a gale. She was got off on the morning of 7 November, and was taken into the Brunswick Dock.

A letter from Belfast dated 30 November 1825 reported that Tamerlane, M'Killop, master, had been sailing from Quebec to the Clyde when she dragged her anchors the night before and had gone on shore at Gray's Point in Belfast Loch. She had lost her rudder and had become waterlogged. She was gotten off on 3 December and was bought up to near Gamoyle, where she remained waterlogged. She arrived at Greenock, Renfrewshire on 12 January 1826, still waterlogged. Earlier, on 10 December she had passed the wreck of a brig of about 200 tons (bm) at 43°N 55°W.

Tamerlane first appeared in Lloyd's Register (LR) in the volume for 1826.

Year	Master	Owner	Trade	Source & notes
1825	M'Killock	Stewart & Co.	Greenock–Quebec	LR; damages repaired 1824 & 1826
1827	M'Killock; R.Miller	Stewart & Co.	Greenock–Quebec	LR; damages repaired 1824 & 1826
1828	B.Miller	Stewart & Co.	Greenock–Bombay	LR; damages repaired 1824 & 1826

In 1813, the EIC had lost its monopoly on the trade between India and Britain. British ships were then free to sail to India or the Indian Ocean under a license from the EIC.

On 28 July 1828, Captain Miller sailed Tamarlane to Bombay.

Then on 28 September 1829, Captain Miller again sailed Tamarlane to Bombay.

Year	Master	Owner	Trade	Source & notes
1831	J.Miller; W.Black	Stewart & Co.	Greenock–Bombay	LR; damages repaired 1824 & 1826
1832	Black; Martin	Stewart & Co.	Greenock–Quebec	LR; damages repaired 1824 & 1826
1833	Martin	Stewart & Co.	Greenock–Sierra Leone	LR; damages 1826 & small repairs 1832
1834	T.Martin	Rodgers	Glasgow–Christiania	LR; homeport Glasgow
1836	J.Smith	Rodgers	Clyde–Quebec	LR; small repairs 1836
1839	G.Fisher	Froste	Liverpool–Quebec	LR; homeport Liverpool; small & damage repairs 1840
1842	G.Fisher; Bennett	Froste	Liverpool–Quebec	LR; homeport Liverpool; small & damage repairs 1840
1844	Thompson	Froste	Liverpool–Quebec	LR; homeport Liverpool; small & damage repairs 1840
1846	McKenney; R.James	Froste	Aberystwith–Quebec	LR; homeport Aberystwith; small repairs 1847
1846	McKenney; R.James	Froste	Aberystwith–Quebec	LR; homeport Aberystwith; small repairs 1847

== Fate ==
On 26 February 1848 her crew abandoned Tamarlane, James, master, in the Channel. She had lost her rudder and been dismasted. Her crew, except for four men who had drowned, were brought into Cherbourg. A later report stated that a fifth man had been crushed to death and that she had been on a voyage returning from taking 500 emigrants to Carthagena from Aberystwyth.
