= Darius (1824 ship) =

UK merchant ship 1824–1829

History

United Kingdom
- Name: Darius
- Launched: 1824, Newcastle-upon-Tyne
- Fate: Foundered circa February 1829

General characteristics
- Tons burthen: 335, or 355 (bm)

Darius was reportedly launched at Newcastle on Tyne in 1824. She foundered without a trace in February 1829.

== Career ==
Darius first appeared in the Register of Shipping (RS) in 1825.

Year	Master	Owner	Trade	Source
1825	Clark	Mickle & Co.	London–Alexandria; London–Batavia	RS

In 1813 the British East India Company (EIC), had lost its monopoly on the trade between India and Britain. British ships were then free to sail to India or the Indian Ocean under a licence from the EIC.

Darius, Bowen, master, sailed from London for Bombay on 9 March 1825, sailing under a licence from the EIC.

Darius, T. Blair, master, sailed from London on 11 April 1827, bound for Mauritius.

Darius, J. Hunter, master, sailed from London on 7 May 1828, bound for Ceylon and Bengal.

== Loss ==
On 8 February 1829, Darius, Hunter, master, sailed from Mauritius for London and was not heard from again. A hurricane that occurred or 12 February was believed to have been the cause of the loss. The same hurricane resulted in the loss of Strenshall.
