= Marquis of Lansdown (1787 ship) =

History

Great Britain
- Owner: 1787:Anthony Brough; 1800:Horncastle & Co.
- Builder: Hill & Mellish, Limehouse
- Launched: 20 January 1787
- Captured: 1 March 1805

General characteristics
- Tons burthen: 647, or 64726/94 (bm)
- Length: Overall:132 ft 6 in (40.4 m); Keel:106 ft 2 in (32.4 m)
- Beam: 33 ft 9 in (10.3 m)
- Depth of hold: 14 ft 1 in (4.3 m)
- Complement: 1793:81; 1799:81
- Armament: 1793:24 × 3&6&9-pounder guns; 1799:24 × 3&6&9-pounder guns; 1800:12 × 9-pounder guns

Marquis of Lansdown was launched in 1787 as an East Indiaman. She made six voyages as an "extra" ship for the British East India Company (EIC) before the EIC declared her worn out. Her owners sold her in 1800 and she became a West Indiaman. The French captured her in 1805 when they captured Dominica.

== Career ==
1st EIC voyage (1787–1788): Captain David Tolmé sailed from the Downs on 12 March 1787, bound for China. Marquis of Lansdown arrived at Whampoa Anchorage on 28 August. Homeward bound, she crossed the Second Bar on 10 January 1788, reached St Helena on 22 April, and arrived back at the Downs on 10 July.

2nd EIC voyage (1790–1791): Captain Tolmé sailed from Plymouth on 3 March 1790, bound for St Helena and China. Marquis of Lansdown reached St Helena on 12 May and arrived at Whampoa on 23 August. Homeward bound, she crossed the Second Bar on 17 November, reached the Cape on 10 April 1791 and St Helena on 27 April, and arrived back at the Downs on 30 June.

3rd EIC voyage (1793–1794): War with France had broken out shortly before Marquis of Lansdown sailed on her third voyage. Captain Joseph Boulderson acquired a letter of marque on 2 April 1793. He sailed from Portsmouth on 22 May, bound for Madras and Bengal. Marquis of Lansdown reached Madras on 16 September and arrived at Diamond Harbour on 4 November. Homeward bound, she was at Saugor on 11 January 1794, reached St Helena on 18 June, and arrived at the Downs on 7 September.

4th EIC voyage (1795–1796): Captain Boulderson sailed from Portsmouth on 18 June 1795, bound for Bengal. Marquis of Lansdown arrived at Diamond Harbour on 27 October. Homeward bound, she was at Saugor on 9 January 1796, reached the Cape on 18 April and St Helena on 5 May, and arrived at the Downs on 2 August.

5th EIC voyage (1797–1798): Captain Boulderson sailed from Portsmouth on 6 April 1797, bound for Madras. Marquis of Lansdown reached Madras on 27 July. From there she arrived at Negapatam on 26 August and Pondicherry on 29 August, before returning to Madras on 2 September. Homeward bound, she was at the Cape on 24 December, and reached St Helena on 5 February 1798. She stopped at Cork on 24 July and arrived at Long Reach 11 July.

6th EIC voyage (1799–1800): Captain William Tryon White acquired a letter of marque on 19 February 1799. He sailed from Portsmouth on 2 April, bound for Madras and Bengal. Marquis of Lansdown reached Madras on 31 July and arrived at Diamond Harbour on 23 August. Homeward bound, she was at Saugor on 5 December and Madras again on 15 January 1800. She reached Point de Galle on 2 February, St Helena on 27 April, and Cork on 29 June. She arrived back at the Downs on 5 July.

When Marquis of Lansdown returned from this voyage the EIC viewed her as worn out, so her owners sold her.

Marquis of Lansdown appeared in Lloyd's Register (LR) in 1800.

Year	Master	Owner	Trade	Source
1800	Atkinson	Horncastle	London–Suriname	LR

As Marquis of Lansdown was returning to England from Jamaica, on 23 June 1802 she sighted a large vessel wrecked on the west end of the Isle of Pines. A sloop from the Grand Caymanes reported that the wrecked vessel was Diana, Williams, master, which had been sailing from Jamaica to Liverpool. A wrecker had visited Diana and salvaged 100 pipes of Madeira wine, which she had taken to Caymanes. Captain Williams had died after leaving Jamaica. Marquis of Lansdown arrived at Gravesend on 9 August.

Marquis of Lansdown did make one voyage to the Baltic. In November 1803 Lloyd's List reported that Marquis of Lansdown, Atkinson, master, had grounded on the Skaw on her way back from Petersburg. On 20 October she was reported to be safe at Obesure, some 40 miles from Gothenburg.

== Fate ==
The French captured Marquis of Lansdown on 1 March 1805 when they captured the island of Dominica. They took her and their other prizes into Guadeloupe, where they arrived on 1 March.
