= Dotterel (1817 ship) =

India-built UK merchant ship 1817–1827

History

United Kingdom
- Name: Dotterel
- Namesake: Eurasian dotterel
- Builder: Coringa
- Launched: 1817
- Fate: Wrecked 1827

General characteristics
- Tons burthen: 150 (bm)
- Sail plan: Brig

Dotterel was a brig launched at Coringa in 1817. A report from Coringa dated 22 September 1817 stated that a heavy gale had occurred on the 18th and that the next day the brig Dotterel, from Bengal, had arrived at the Roads flying a flag of distress. She had shipped a heavy sea and immediately went down. A report dated Calcutta November 1818 reported the arrival at Bengal of the brig Dotterel from Masulipatnam, without her mainmast. The report stated that she had earlier been reported lost in "Coreland Roads".

Dotterel was wrecked in 1827 in the Tamar River at Launceston, Van Diemen's Land, soon after leaving the river on 18 March 1827. One crewman drowned. She was under the command of Captain Charles Bell and was carrying a cargo of wheat and wool to Sydney. She gave her name to Dotterel Reef (41°3′S 146°47′E) and the nearby Dotterel Point (41°3′S 146°47′E). Some of her gear and fittings were recovered. The wreck was burned to recover her iron work. The cutter Speedwell, Captain James Corlette, then took the ironwork to Launceston.

Dotterel, and Marquis of Lansdown, which also had been built in India, had each obtained a license from the British East India Company to trade in tea for two years, with any port eastward of the Cape of Good Hope.
