= French brig Endymion =

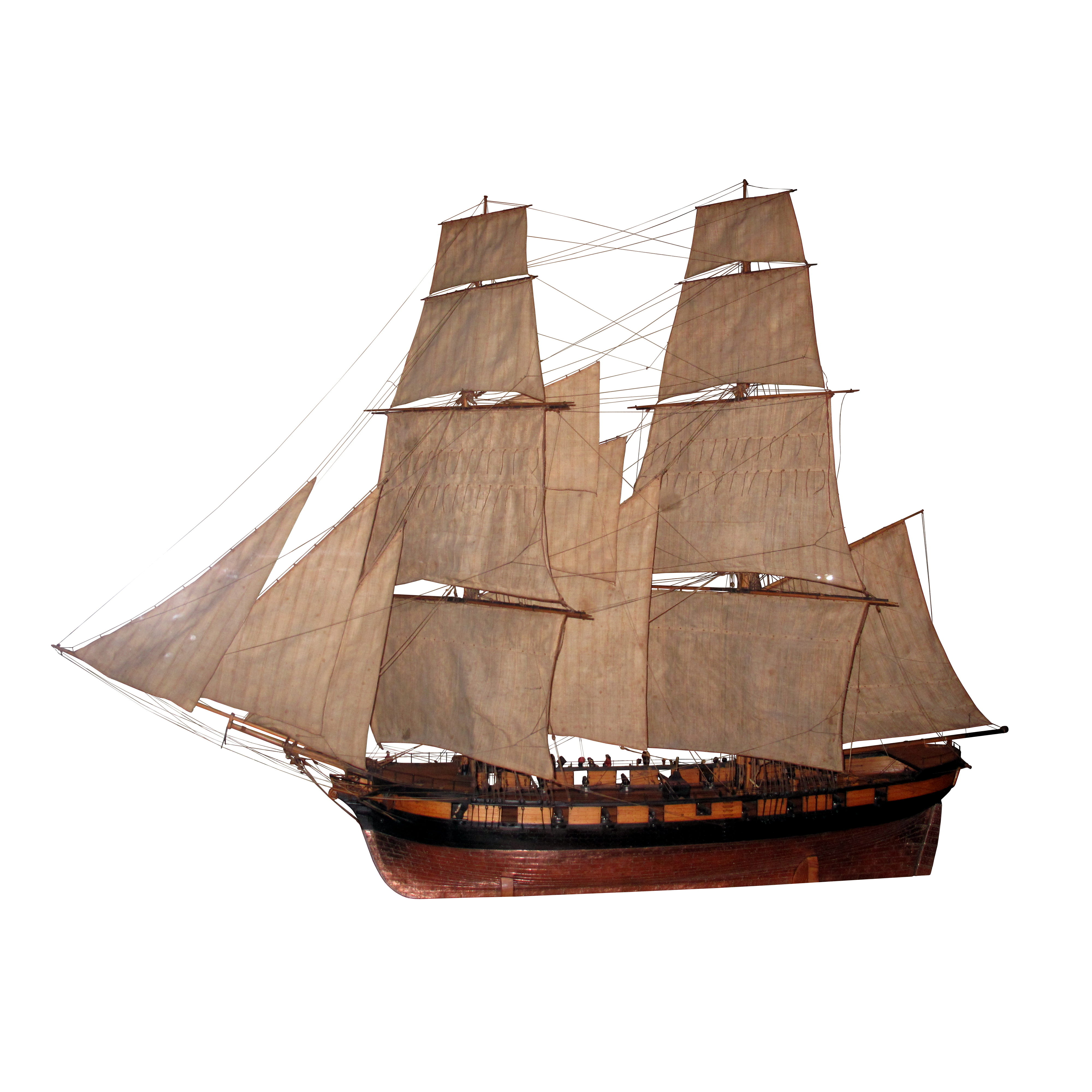
- Generic 20-gun brig of the 1830s, possibly Endymion. On display at Toulon naval museum.

History

France
- Name: Endymion
- Namesake: Endymion
- Ordered: 27 August 1822
- Builder: Lorient
- Laid down: 21 January 1823
- Launched: 26 July 1824
- Commissioned: 17 May 1825
- Stricken: 7 October 1840
- Fate: Broken up 1840

General characteristics
- Sail plan: Brig
- Armament: 18 guns

Endymion was a 20-gun brig of the French Navy, designed by Barallier.

== Career ==
Commissioned under Captain Crespel, she sailed in the Caribbean and off Brazil. She took part in the Didon took part in the Invasion of Algiers in 1830 under Lieutenant Nonay, landing troops at the attack on fort Mers-el-Kebir, and in the Battle of the Tagus the next year. On the Tagus, she ferried the last diplomatic demarches before the French assault on Lisbon.

The ship was broken up in December 1840.
