= Marquis of Lansdown (1824 ship) =

History

United Kingdom
- Builder: John Scott & Co., Fort Gloucester, Calcutta
- Launched: 30 March 1824
- Fate: Last listed in 1847

General characteristics
- Tons burthen: 208, or 225, or 22578/94, or 226, or 233 (bm)
- Length: 92 ft 5 in (28.2 m)
- Beam: 22 ft 10 in (7.0 m)

Marquis/Marquess of Lansdown/Lansdowne was launched at Calcutta in 1824. She was initially a "country ship", trading east of the Cape of Good Hope. She then sailed to Port Jackson, but plans to establish a packet service between Australia and Calcutta, including taking tea from India to Australia under a licence from the British East India Company (EIC), did not work out. She then sailed to England and became a whaler, making four voyages to the British southern whale fishery between 1829 and 1845. She was last listed in 1847.

== Career ==
Marquis of Lansdown was lasted in the 1827 volume of the East-India register and directory. 1827 with W.Heathorne, master, and Palmer and Co., owners. The volume for the next year showed her with R.Royes, master, and John Lord, owner.

Marquis of Lansdown, G.Noyes, master, arrived at Hobart on 8 January 1827 from Calcutta, Sincapore, and Batavia, the last of which she had left on 12 November 1826. She was carrying two runaway convicts from Sydney, and four soldiers being transported to New South Wales as punishment. She also carried cargo and passengers. On 30 January she sailed for Sydney, and arrived there on 12 February, together with her six prisoners. On 10 March she sailed back to Hobart; from there she sailed back to Calcutta. Her owner, Mr. John Lord, who had come out from Calcutta on her, intended for her to re-establish trade between Australia and Calcutta, with Marquis of Lansdown being able to carry Indian products, such as tea, by virtue of sailing under a licence from the British East India Company. She arrived at Hobart on 20 March with a cargo of tea. (Note: Marquis of Lansdown and Dotterel, which also had been built in India, had each obtained a license to trade in tea for two years, with any port eastward of the Cape of Good Hope. Dotterel, however, was wrecked in March 1827.) On 6 April Marquis of Lansdown sailed for Sydney and Calcutta, and she arrived there on 16 April. On 19 May she sailed for Calcutta.

John Lord's plans appear not to have come to fruition. The 1829 volume of East-India register and directory showed her with R.Royce, master, but Palmer & CO., owners. In March 1829 she had sailed to England from Australia. She then appeared in Lloyd's Register (LR) for 1829.

Year	Master	Owner	Trade	Source
1829	Plant	Templer & Co.	London–South Seas	LR

Although LR carried her owner as H.Templer, Templer & Co. were her ship's husband. Her owner was Somes & Co.

1st whaling voyage (1829–1832): Captain W. Plant sailed on 29 October 1829. LR showed her as having sailed on 1 November for Japan and Timor. Marquis of Lansdown returned on 2 November 1832 with 100 casks of whale oil that she had gathered in the Pacific near Guam and the Japan grounds.

2nd whaling voyage (1833–1836): Captain Plant sailed on 1 February 1833. Marquis of Lansdown returned on 20 December 1836 with 500 casks of whale oil that she had gathered in the waters around Timor. On 18 June 1835 she had been of Battogada.

3rd whaling voyage (1837–1841): Captain Plant sailed on 15 August 1837. Marquis of Lansdown returned on 27 April 1841 with 143 tuns of whale oil that she had gathered in the waters around Timor.

4th whaling voyage (1841–1845): Captain Plant sailed on 27 September 1841. Marquis of Lansdown returned on 26 August 1845 with 400 casks (126 tuns) of whale oil that she had gathered in the waters around Timor.

Marquis of Lansdown underwent a change of master and owner, as well as repairs on her return from her last whaling voyage.

Year	Master	Owner	Trade	Source & notes
1845	R.White	Trapp & Co.	London	LR; small repairs 1846
1847	R.Waite	Trapp & Co.	London	LR; small repairs 1846

== Fate ==
Marquis of Lansdown was last listed in 1847.
