= HDMS Dronning Marie =

Ship of the Royal Danish Navy

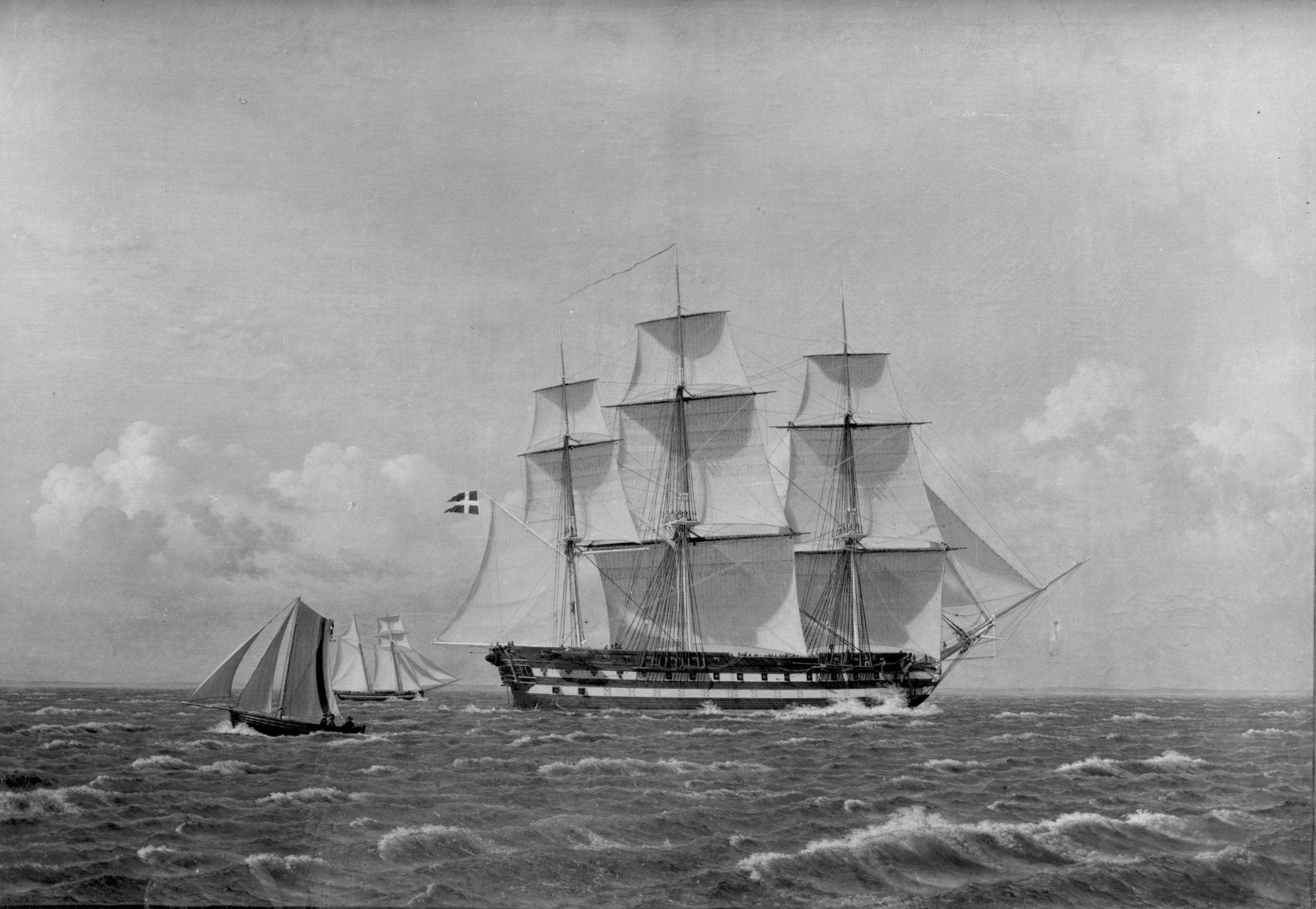
- Dronning Marie painted by Christoffer Wilhelm Eckersberg in 1835

History

Denmark
- Name: Dronning Marie(Dronning Maria'
- Owner: Royal Danish Navy
- Builder: Royal Danish Naval Dockyard
- Launched: 16 September 1824
- Decommissioned: 1862

General characteristics
- Class & type: Ship of the line
- Length: 180 ft
- Beam: 46 ft
- Complement: 771
- Armament: 84 x 30-pounder guns

HDMS Dronning Marie was a ship of the line of the Royal Danish Navy.

== Construction and design ==
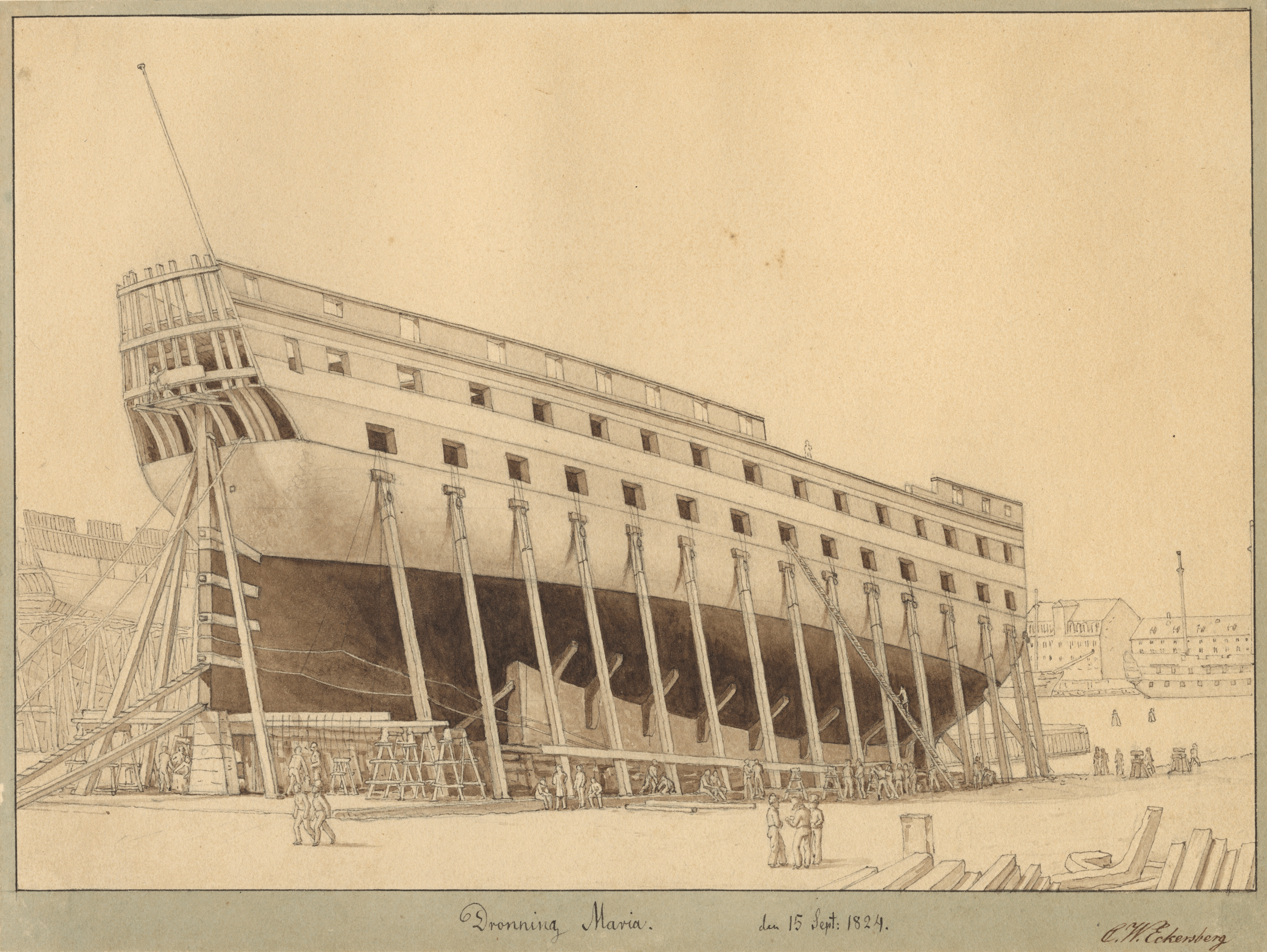
C. F. Eckersberg: Dronning Marie under construction at Nyholm, 1824

She was named in honour of Wieen Marie.

Dronning Marie was built at Nyholm to a design by Andreas Schifter. Construction started in 1821 and was not completed until 1827. She was launched in 1824.

Dronning Marie was 180 feet long, with a beam of 46 feet and a draught of 19 feet. Her complement was 771 men. Her initial gun armament was 84 30-pounder guns.

== Naval career and fate ==
Dronning Marie was under the command of Ulrich Anthon Schønheyder on her maiden journey in 1934. Eckersberg asked Harbour Master at Nyholm Søren Ludvig Tuxen for permission to participate on the ship's maiden voyage around Zealand. He and his friend Emil Normann boarded the ship on 5 July. On 7 July, in the Bay of Sejrø, the two went off in a rowing boat to paint the vessel in the Great Belt. Eckersberg got off in Nyborg. Dronning Marie grounded south of Sprogø in 1834. The locality is now known as Dronning Marias Puller.

Later the same year, Dronning Marie took Crown Prince Frederik (VII) to Iceland and the Faroe Islands. Other passengers of the ship on that voyage was the painter Theodor Kloss-

In 1849, she was converted into a 60-gun frigate.

After the Battle of Bov, in 1848, Dronning Marie was for a while used as a prison ship in Copenhagen. In 1858, Dronning Marie was put into use as an accommodation ship at Nyholm. She was decommissioned in 1862. She existed until at least 1888.

== Legacy ==
Christoffer Wilhelm Eckersberg has created an 1834 painting of Dronning Merie as well as an 1824 drawing of her under construction. She is also known from a number of other drawings and lithographs. Her figurehead was for many years installed as a monument at Holmen in Copenhagen. It has later been moved to Frederikshavn Naval Base in Frederikshavn.

== Gallery ==
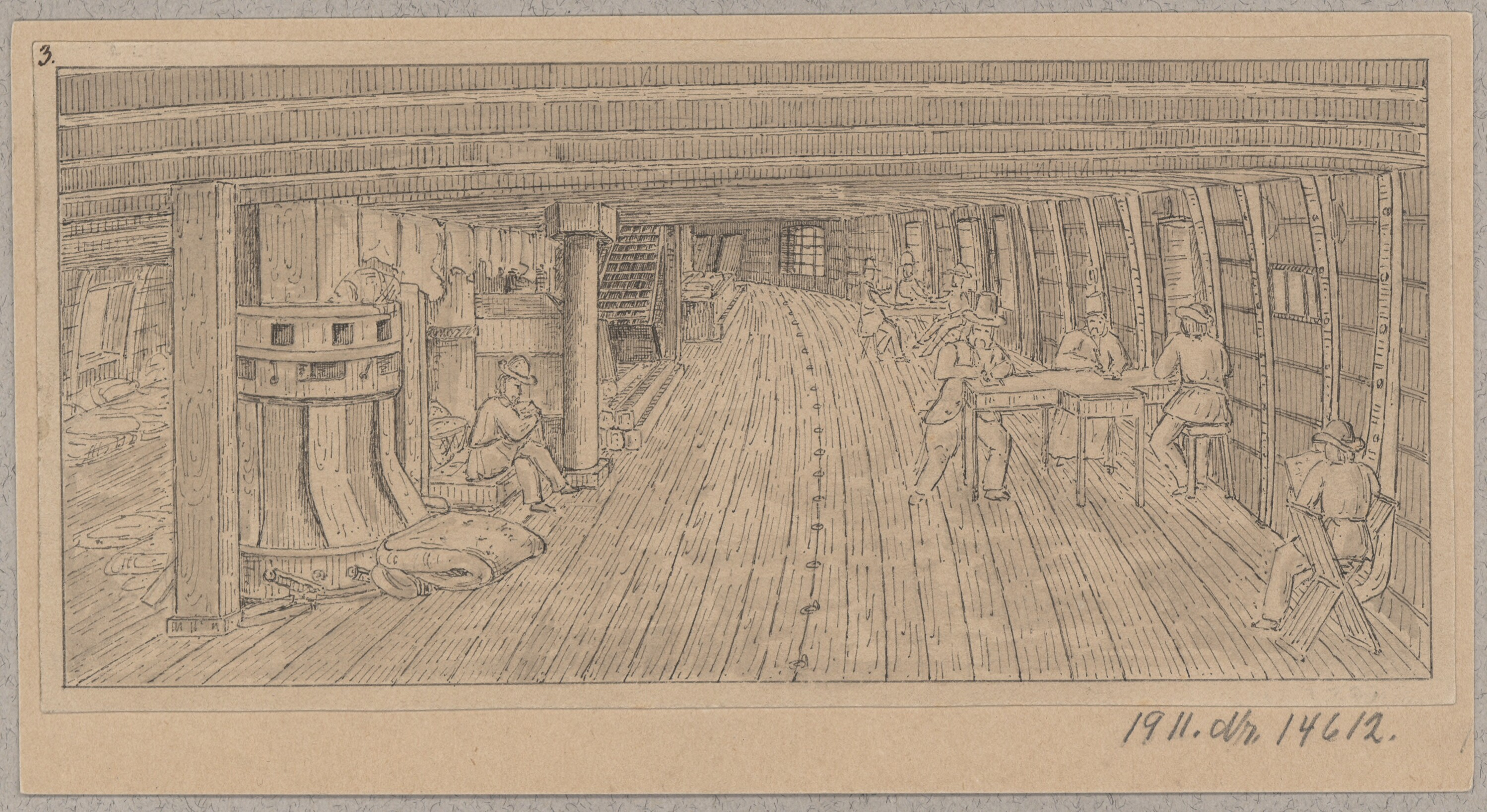
Dronning Marie, 1848.

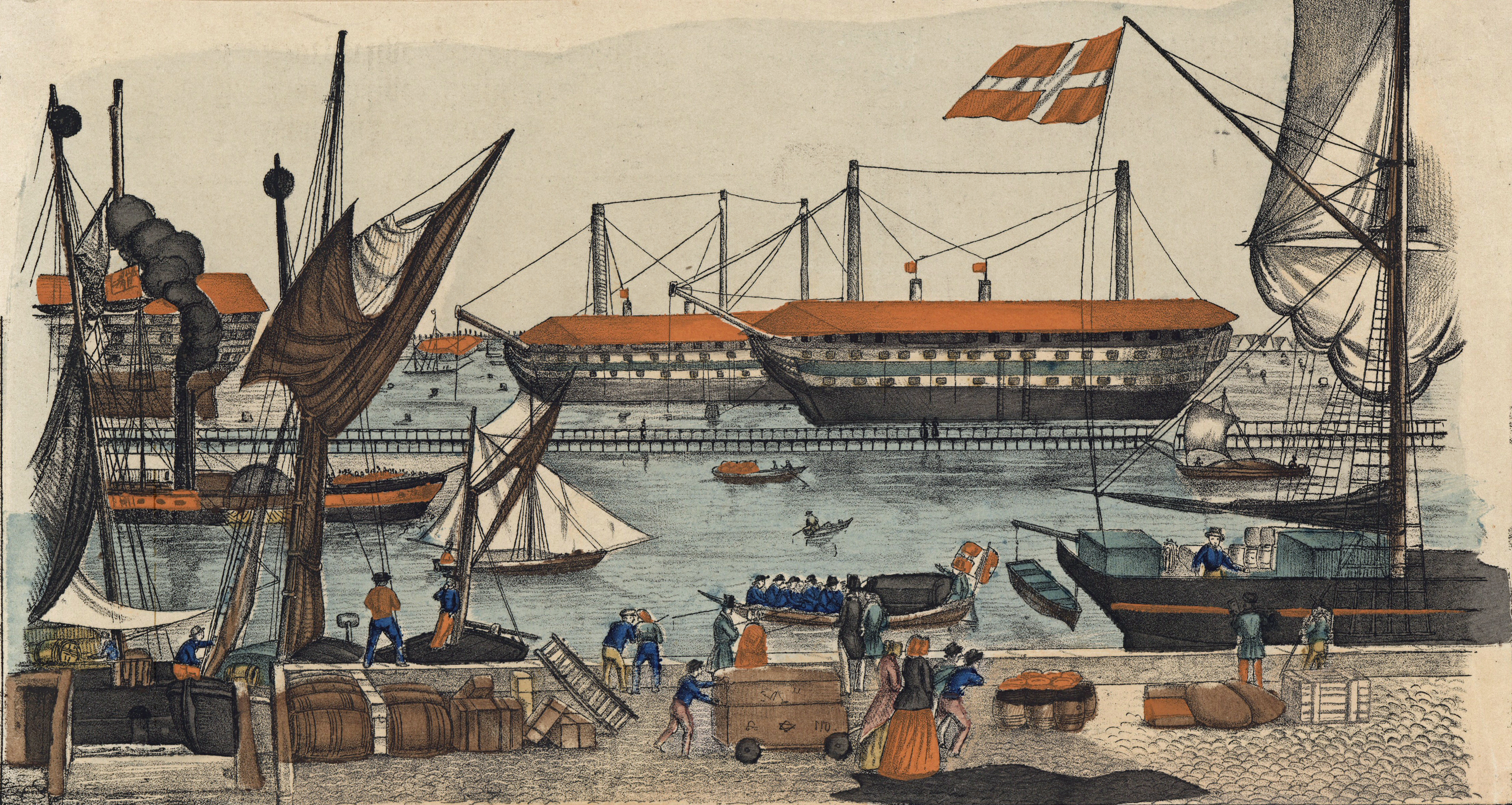
The hulks of the "Dronning Marie" and "Valdemar" used as prison ships in the harbor of Copenhagen after the battle of Bov 1848.

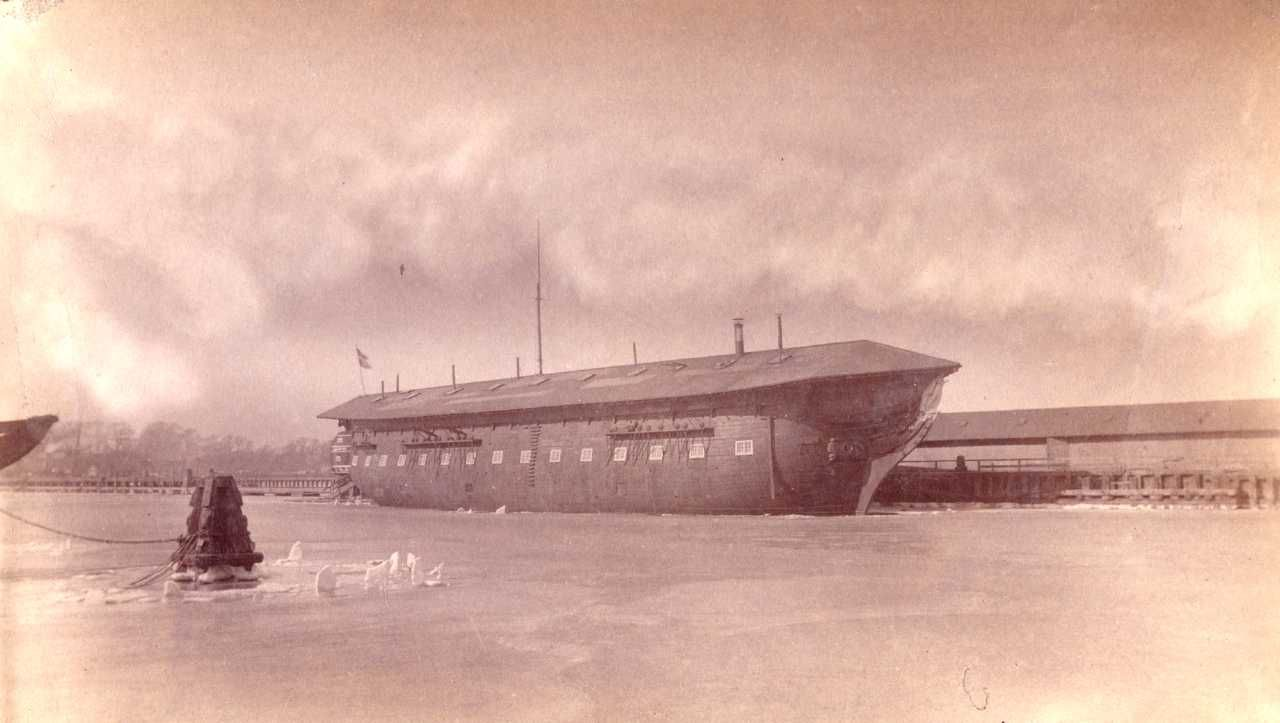
Dronning Marie as accommodation ship.

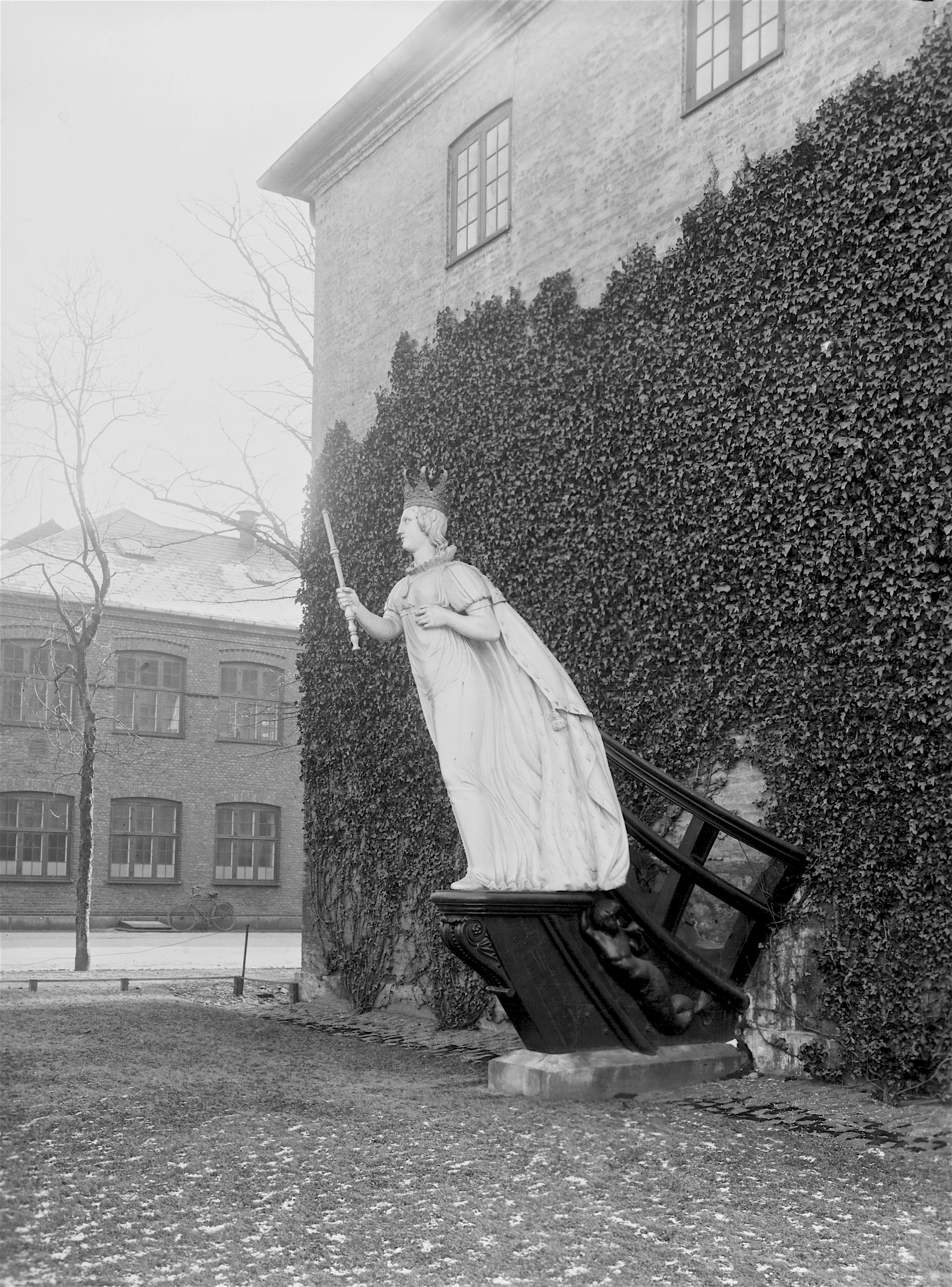
The ship's figurehead at Holmen.

== Works cited ==
- Smidt, Wolbert G. C. (2014). "Ein Afroamerikaner im Kampf gegen die Kolonialmacht Der Sklaven-Nachkomme und dänische Untertan Reed im Aufstand gegen Dänemark 1848-51" (PDF). Ethnorêma (in German) (14): 71–98. doi:10.23814/ethn.14.18.smi. Archived from the original (PDF) on February 9, 2019.
