= Atlas (disambiguation) =

An atlas is a collection of maps.

Atlas may also refer to:

== Arts, entertainment and media ==
=== Fictional characters ===
- Atlas (DC Comics), several fictional characters
- Atlas (Teen Titans)
- Atlas, an Astro Boy (1980) character
- Atlas (BioShock)
- Atlas, a BattleMech in the BattleTech universe
- Atlas, an antagonist in Mega Man ZX Advent
- Atlas, a Portal 2 character
- Atlas, a PS238 character
- Erik Josten, a.k.a. Atlas, a Marvel Comics supervillain
- The Atlas, a strong driving force from No Man's Sky

=== Literature ===
- Atlas, a photography book by Gerhard Richter
- The Atlas (novel), by William T. Vollmann
- Atlas (magazine)
- The Atlas (newspaper), published in England from 1826 to 1869

=== Music ===
==== Bands ====
- Atlas (New Zealand band), a New Zealand rock band
- Atlas (Thai band), a Thai boy band

==== Albums ====
- Atlas (Kinky album)
- Atlas (Laurel Halo album)
- Atlas (Parkway Drive album)
- Atlas (Real Estate album)
- Atlas (RÜFÜS album)
- Atlas (The Score album)

==== Opera ====
- Atlas (opera), 1991, by Meredith Monk
  - Atlas: An Opera in Three Parts, a 1993 recording of Monk's opera

==== Songs ====
- "Atlas" (Battles song), 2007
- "Atlas" (Bicep song), 2020
- "Atlas" (Coldplay song), 2013
- "Atlas" (Guns N' Roses song), 2025
- "Atlas", from The Tide, the Thief & River's End by Caligula's Horse
- "Atlas", from Man Overboard by Man Overboard
- "Atlas", from The Amanuensis by Monuments
- "Atlas[t]", from Divided By by Structures
- "Atlas", by Coheed and Cambria
- "Atlas", by Delphic
- "Atlas", by Good Kid
- "Atlas", by Jake Chudnow, used as the main theme in the YouTube series Mind Field
- "Atlas, Rise!", from Hardwired... to Self-Destruct by Metallica

=== Gaming ===
- The Atlas (video game), a 1991 multiplatform strategy video game
- Atlas (video game), a massively-multiplayer online video game released for early access in 2018
- Atlas Corporation, an arms manufacturer in the video game series Borderlands
- Atlas Corporation, a private military company in the video game Call of Duty: Advanced Warfare
- The Atlas, an omnipresent cosmic entity that plays a central role in the lore of the video game No Man's Sky

=== Other uses in arts, entertainment and media ===
- Atlas (1961 film), an action-adventure film
- Atlas (2024 film), an American science fiction thriller film
- Atlas (comic book series), by Dylan Horrocks
- Atlas (statue), by Lee Lawrie in Rockefeller Center

== Businesses and organizations ==
- Atlas Air, an American cargo airline
- Atlas Aircraft, a 1940s aircraft manufacturer
- Atlas Aviation, an aircraft maintenance firm
- Atlas Blue, a Moroccan low-cost airline
- Atlas (appliance company), in Belarus
- Atlas Car and Manufacturing Company, a locomotive manufacturer
- Atlas Comics (1950s), a publisher
- Atlas/Seaboard Comics, a 1970s line of comics
- Atlas Consortium, a group of technology companies
- Atlas Copco, a Swedish company founded in 1873
- Atlas Corporation, an investment company
- Atlas Drop Forge Company, a parts subsidiary of REO Motor Car Company
- Atlas Elektronik, a German naval/marine electronics and systems business
- Atlas Entertainment, a film production company
- Atlas Group, a Pakistani business group
- Atlas Media Corp., a non-fiction entertainment company
- Atlas Aircraft Corporation, a South African military aircraft manufacturer
- Atlas Model Railroad, American maker of model trains and accessories
- Atlas Network, formerly Atlas Economic Research Foundation
- Atlas Powder Company, an American explosives and chemicals company
- Atlas Press, a UK publisher
- Atlas Press (tool company)
- Atlas (restaurant), a Michelin-starred restaurant in Atlanta
- Atlas Solutions, an online advertising subsidiary of Meta Platforms
- Atlas Van Lines, a moving company
- Atlas Werke, a defunct German shipbuilding company
- RTV Atlas, a broadcaster in Montenegro

== Military ==
- Airbus A400M Atlas, a military aircraft produced since 2007
- Armstrong Whitworth Atlas, a British military aircraft produced 1927–1933
- ATLAS (simulation) (Army Tactical Level Advanced Simulation), a Thai military system
- Atlas Aircraft Corporation, a South African military aircraft manufacturer
- French ship Atlas, several French Navy ships
- HMLAT-303, a US Marine Corps helicopter training squadron
- HMS Atlas, several Royal Navy ships
- SM-65 Atlas intercontinental ballistic missile (ICBM)
- USS Atlas, several U.S. Navy ships

== Mythological and legendary figures ==
- Atlas (mythology), a Titan in ancient Greek mythology
- Atlas of Atlantis, the first legendary king of Atlantis
- Atlas of Mauretania, a legendary king

== People ==
- Atlas (name), including lists of people with the given name or surname

== Places ==
=== United States ===
- Atlas, Illinois
- Atlas, Texas
- Atlas, Wisconsin
- Atlas District, in Washington, D.C.
- Atlas Peak AVA, a California wine region
- Atlas Township, Michigan

=== Other places ===
- Atlas Cinema, a historic movie theatre in Istanbul, Turkey
- Atlas Mountains, a set of mountain ranges in northwestern Africa
- Atlas, Nilüfer, a village in Bursa Province, Turkey

== Science and technology ==
=== Astronomy ===
- Advanced Topographic Laser Altimeter System (ATLAS), a space-based lidar instrument on ICESat-2
- Atlas (crater), on the near side of the Moon
- Atlas (moon), a moon of Saturn
- Atlas (star), a triple star system in the constellation of Taurus and a member of the Pleiades
- Asteroid Terrestrial-impact Last Alert System (ATLAS)
- Comet ATLAS, any of several comets discovered by ATLAS
  - 3I/ATLAS, an interstellar comet discovered by ATLAS

=== Computing and robotics ===
- Atlas (computer), a 1960s supercomputer
  - Atlas Supervisor, its operating system
- Atlas (robot)
- ATLAS (software), a tool to scan American citizenship records for candidates for denaturalization
- Atlas, a computer used at the Lawrence Livermore National Laboratory in 2006
- Abbreviated Test Language for All Systems (ATLAS), a computer language for equipment testing
- Advanced Technology Leisure Application Simulator (ATLAS), a hydraulic motion simulator used in theme parks
- ASP.NET AJAX (formerly "Atlas"), a set of ASP.NET extensions
- ATLAS Transformation Language, a programming language for model transformation
- Atlas.ti, a qualitative analysis program
- Automatically Tuned Linear Algebra Software (ATLAS)
- ChatGPT Atlas, an AI web browser
- MongoDB Atlas, a cloud database offering from MongoDB
- ERA Atlas, a version of the UNIVAC 1101, a 1950s American computer

=== Mathematics ===
- Atlas (topology), a set of charts
  - A set of charts which covers a manifold
- A smooth structure, a maximal smooth atlas for a topological manifold

=== Physics ===
- Argonne Tandem Linear Accelerator System (ATLAS), at the Argonne National Laboratory
- ATLAS experiment, a particle detector for the Large Hadron Collider at CERN
- Atomic-terrace low-angle shadowing (ATLAS), a nanofabrication technique

=== Biology and healthcare ===
==== Animals and plants ====
- Atlas bear
- Atlas beetle
- Atlas cedar
- Atlas moth
- Atlas pied flycatcher, a bird
- Atlas turtle
- Atlas deer
- Atlas lion
- Atlas, a book about flora and/or fauna of a region, such as atlases of the flora and fauna of Britain and Ireland

==== Other uses in biology and healthcare ====
- Atlas (anatomy), a vertebra in the cervical spine
- Atlas personality, the personality of someone whose childhood was characterized by excessive responsibilities

== Sport ==
- Atlas Delmenhorst, a German association football club
- Atlas F.C., a Mexican professional football club
- Club Atlético Atlas, an Argentine amateur football club
- KK Atlas, a former Serbian men's professional basketball club

== Transport ==
=== Aerospace ===
- Atlas (rocket family)
- AeroVelo Atlas, a human-powered helicopter
- Birdman Atlas, an ultralight aircraft
- La Mouette Atlas, a French hang glider design

=== Automotive ===
- Atlas (1951 automobile), a French mini-car
- Atlas (light trucks), a Greek motor vehicle manufacturer
- Atlas (Pittsburgh automobile), produced 1906–1907
- Atlas (Springfield automobile), produced 1907–1913
- Atlas, a British van by the Standard Motor Company produced 1958–1962
- Atlas Motor Buggy, an American highwheeler produced in 1909
- Ford Atlas, a concept pickup truck that previewed the then-new 2015 F-150
- Geely Atlas, a sport utility vehicle
- General Motors Atlas engine
- Honda Atlas Cars Pakistan, a car manufacturer
- Nissan Atlas, a Japanese light truck
- Volkswagen Atlas, a sport utility vehicle

=== Ships and boats ===
- Atlas (ship), various merchant ships
- ST Atlas, a Swedish tugboat

=== Trains ===
- Atlas, an 1863–1885 South Devon Railway Dido class locomotive
- Atlas, a 1927–1962 LMS Royal Scot Class locomotive

== Other uses ==
- Atlas (architecture)
- Atlas (storm), which hit the Midwestern US in October 2013
- Agrupación de Trabajadores Latinoamericanos Sindicalistas (ATLAS), a 1950s Latin American trade union confederation
- Atlas languages, Berber languages spoken in the Atlas Mountains of Morocco
- ATLAS Network, a network of European special police units
- Atlas power station, İskenderun, Hatay Province, Turkey
- Atlas Uranium Mill, Moab, Utah, US
- Atlas folio, a book size

== See also ==
- Altas (disambiguation)
- AtlasGlobal, a former Turkish airline
- Atlas-Imperial, an American diesel engine manufacturer
- Atlas Mara Limited, formerly Atlas Mara Co-Nvest Limited, a financial holding company that owns banks in Africa
- Dresser Atlas, a provider of oilfield and factory automation services
- Tele Atlas, a Dutch mapping company
- Western Atlas, an oilfield services company
- Brain atlas, a neuroanatomical map of the brain of a human or other animal
- Black Atlass, a Canadian musician
- Advanced Technology Large-Aperture Space Telescope (ATLAST)
