= Atlas Motor Buggy =

Early automobile

The Atlas Motor Buggy was a prototype highwheeler produced by the Atlas Motor Buggy firm of Indianapolis in 1909. After the sole prototype was built, the firm returned to its two-stroke gasoline and diesel stationary engine production. Later, the Atlas factory was used for the Lyons-Knight, after the Lyons brothers bought the company.
