= Atlas (Pittsburgh automobile) =

Defunct American motor vehicle manufacturer

Atlas Automobile Company
- Industry: Automobile
- Founded: 1906
- Defunct: 1907
- Fate: closed
- Successor: none
- Headquarters: College Ave., East End, Pittsburgh, Pennsylvania
- Key people: W.H. La Fountain; William G. Hughes; Alfred F. Bennett
- Products: automobiles trucks Taxicabs
- Parent: none
- Subsidiaries: none

The Atlas car was built in Pittsburgh, Pennsylvania, in 1906–1907. The Atlas Automobile Company was established on College Avenue in the East End of Pittsburgh, Pennsylvania in late 1906 in a "fireproof garage." It was a four-cylinder car rated at 25/30 hp with shaft drive and a 3-speed sliding gear transmission. It was offered as a touring car or runabout. The firm was out of business by the next year.
