= HMS Atlas =

Two ships of the British Royal Navy have been named HMS Atlas:

- HMS Atlas (1782), a second-rate ship of the line launched in 1782 and broken up in 1821.
- HMS Atlas (1860), a 91-gun, second-rate ship launched at Chatham Dockyard on 21 July 1860 but kept in reserve after her steam trials, and never commissioned. Lent to the Metropolitan Asylums Board in July 1881 and broken up in 1904.
