= Atlas Press (tool company) =

Atlas Press Co. was a tool company that manufactured popular brands of metalworking tools from 1920 to the mid-1970s. Many of their products received wide coverage in Popular Mechanics and Popular Science at the time.

== History ==
In 1911, the inventor Gardner T. Eames of Kalamazoo, Michigan filed for a patent on a new type of arbor press, but was unable to secure funding for production. Eames partnered with Herbert H. Everard to create the G.T. Eames Company, under the agreement that the rights to the patent were to be shared between both men. The company started producing the press under the "Eames Presses" brand with some success. In 1913, Everard died, leaving his controlling share of the firm to his daughter and her husband, John Penniman. Eames eventually became disillusioned with the Pennimans' handling of the company and sold his shares to them for $5,000. Penniman subsequently moved the company to another location in Kalamazoo, renaming it to Atlas Press Company. Eames opened a machine shop and continued to build and sell presses under the old trademark, which eventually led to conflict between the two parties, both of whom claimed exclusivity over the patent, as well as additional improvements made by Eames.

=== Patent dispute ===
In 1919 the Pennimans filed an unfair trade lawsuit against Eames (Atlas Press Co. v. Eames), claiming rights over the trademark, patent and improved design. The case was argued in front of the Michigan Supreme Court, which ruled that Eames had to cease use of the trademark, but refusing the transfer of the improved press to the Atlas company.

=== Later years ===
In 1920 the company began making and selling small machine tools, including drill presses and lathes, as well as woodworking tools, such as jointers and table saws. They were sold through the Sears catalog, some of them re-branded under the Craftsman name. In 1965, the company changed its name to Clausing Industrial, Inc. and divested its woodworking product lines to focus on industrial machinery. In 1985, the 600 Group acquired parts of Clausing. The Clausing brand is still used today. The 600 Group, which had earlier also acquired the British Colchester and T.S. Harrison lathe brands (in 1954 and 1971, respectively), also recombined the branding to include the Clausing Colchester (North America only) and Colchester Harrison names.
