= Geely Boyue =

Compact SUV

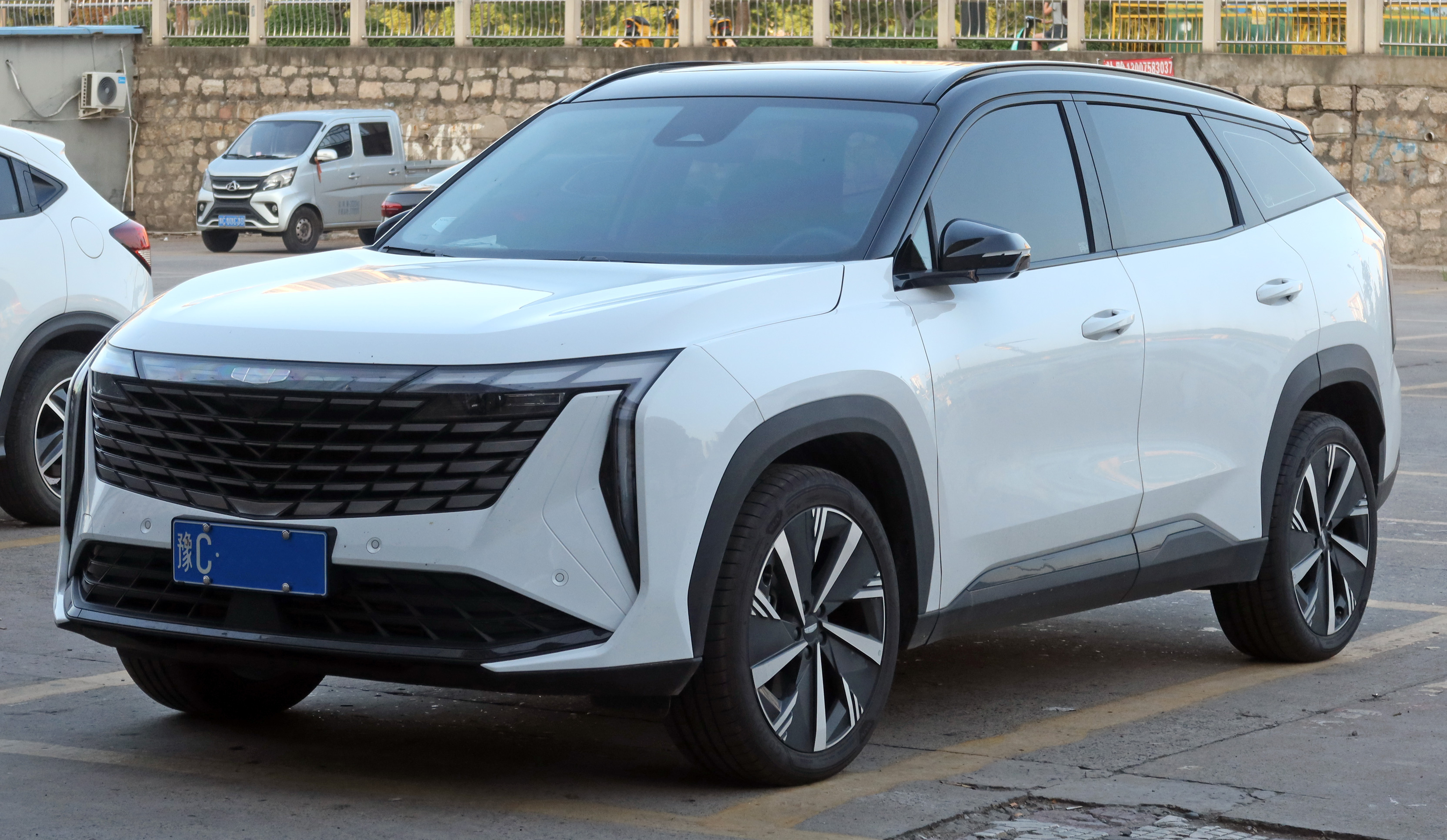
- Geely Boyue L

Overview
- Manufacturer: Geely Auto
- Production: 2016–present

Body and chassis
- Class: Compact SUV
- Body style: 5-door SUV
- Layout: Front-engine, front-wheel-drive or all-wheel-drive

The Geely Boyue (Chinese: 吉利博越; pinyin: Jílì Bóyuè) is a compact SUV produced by the Chinese automaker Geely Auto.

The first generation model (sold as the Geely Atlas overseas) was launched in 2016 and rebadged as the Proton X70 for Malaysia.

In 2019, the second generation marketed as Boyue Pro in 2019 for the domestic market (as the Geely Azkarra overseas) was launched. The Boyue Pro later spawned a pickup variant called the Farizon FX in 2020. An addition sports appearance update replaced the Boyue Pro in 2021 and was called the Boyue X. The Boyue received a facelift in 2022 and was sold alongside the Boyue X.

In October 2022, the third generation Boyue called Boyue L was launched using the CMA platform. It is exported as the Geely Starray and Geely Atlas. Another smaller version was introduced as the Geely Boyue Cool, which is built on BMA platform, later renamed to simply Geely Boyue.

In May 2025, the fourth generation was launched, upgraded with GEEA 3.0 electronic/electrical architecture and new infotainment system.

Timeline of Boyue
2016	Boyue (NL-3, first generation)
2017	Proton X70 (rebadged first generation)
2018	Boyue (first gen facelift)
2019	Boyue Pro/Azkarra (NL-3B, second generation)
2020	Farizon FX (pickup truck variant)
2021	Boyue X (second generation facelift)
2022	Boyue (second gen facelift)
2022	Boyue L (FX11, third generation)
2023	Galaxy L7 (FX12, PHEV variant)
2023	Boyue Cool (G246)
2024	Boyue (G246 renamed)
2024	Proton X70 (rebadged second generation)
2025	Boyue L (fourth generation)
2025	Boyue (third generation facelift)
2026	Galaxy M7 (fourth gen PHEV variant)
2026	Boyue REV (Livan 7 EREV variant)

== First generation (NL-3; 2016) ==
First generation
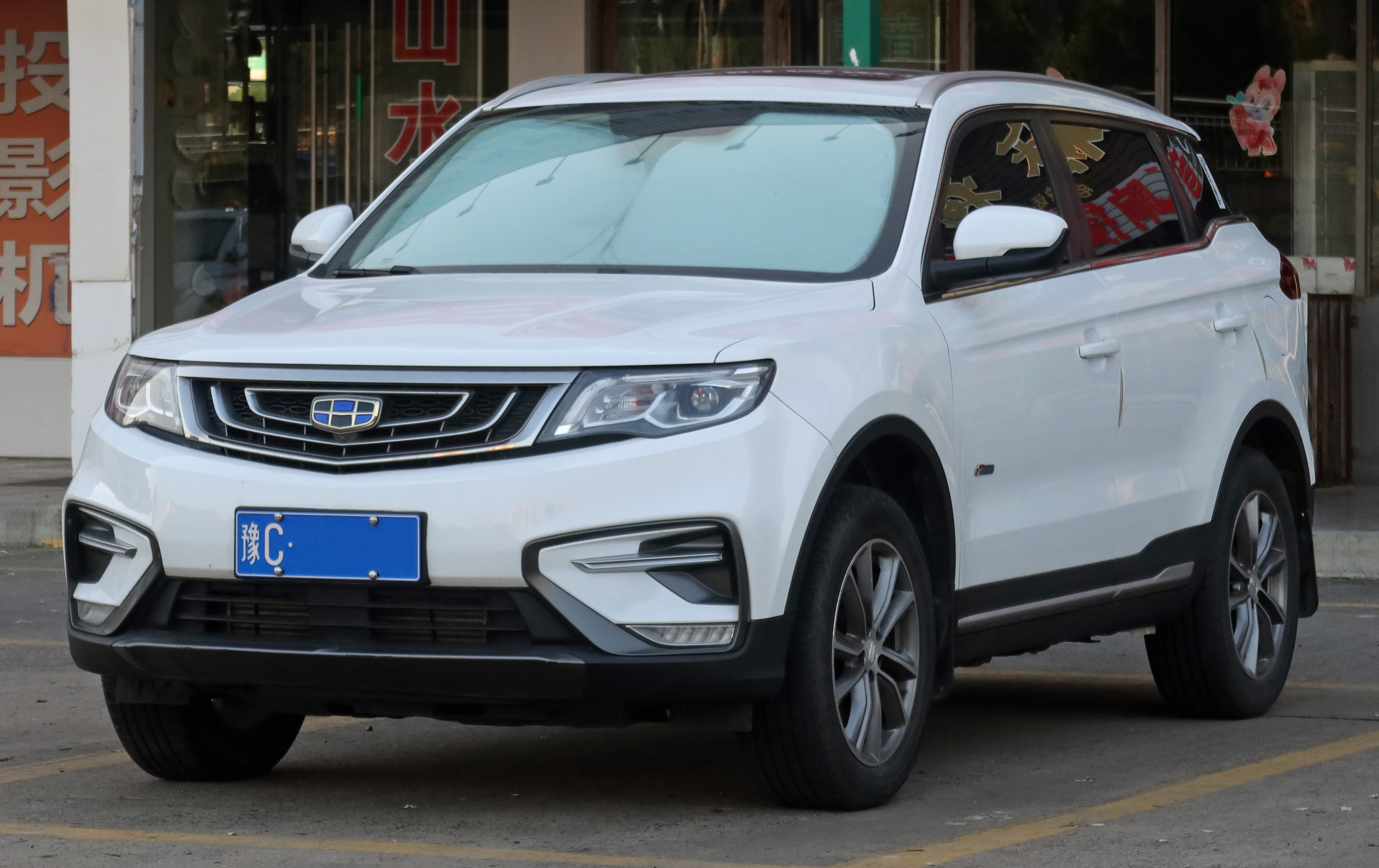
- 2019 Geely Boyue (first facelift)

Overview
- Model code: NL-3
- Also called: Geely Atlas; Geely Emgrand X7 Sport; Proton X70 (Malaysia, Brunei, Pakistan, South Africa)
- Production: 2016–2020; 2018–2024 (Proton X70)
- Assembly: China: Baoji, Shaanxi; Ningbo, Zhejiang; Malaysia: Tanjung Malim, Proton City, Perak (PTMSB, X70); Pakistan: Karachi (Al-Haj Group, X70)

Body and chassis
- Platform: Geely NL
- Related: Geely Borui

Powertrain
- Engine: Petrol: 1.5 L 3G15TDB G-Power turbo I3; 1.8 L 4G18TDB G-Power turbo I4; 2.0 L 4G20 I4; 2.4 L JLD-4G24 I4 (Middle East)
- Transmission: 6-speed manual 6-speed automatic 7-speed dual-clutch

Dimensions
- Wheelbase: 2,670 mm (105.1 in)
- Length: 4,519 mm (177.9 in)
- Width: 1,831 mm (72.1 in)
- Height: 1,694 mm (66.7 in)
- Curb weight: 1,565–1,690 kg (3,450–3,726 lb)

Originally planned to be launched as part of the Emgrand series during development, the Boyue was launched as an independent product under the Geely brand on 26 March 2016. In the South American market, this SUV was offered under the name Geely Emgrand X7 Sport, being integrated into the Geely Emgrand product subdivision.

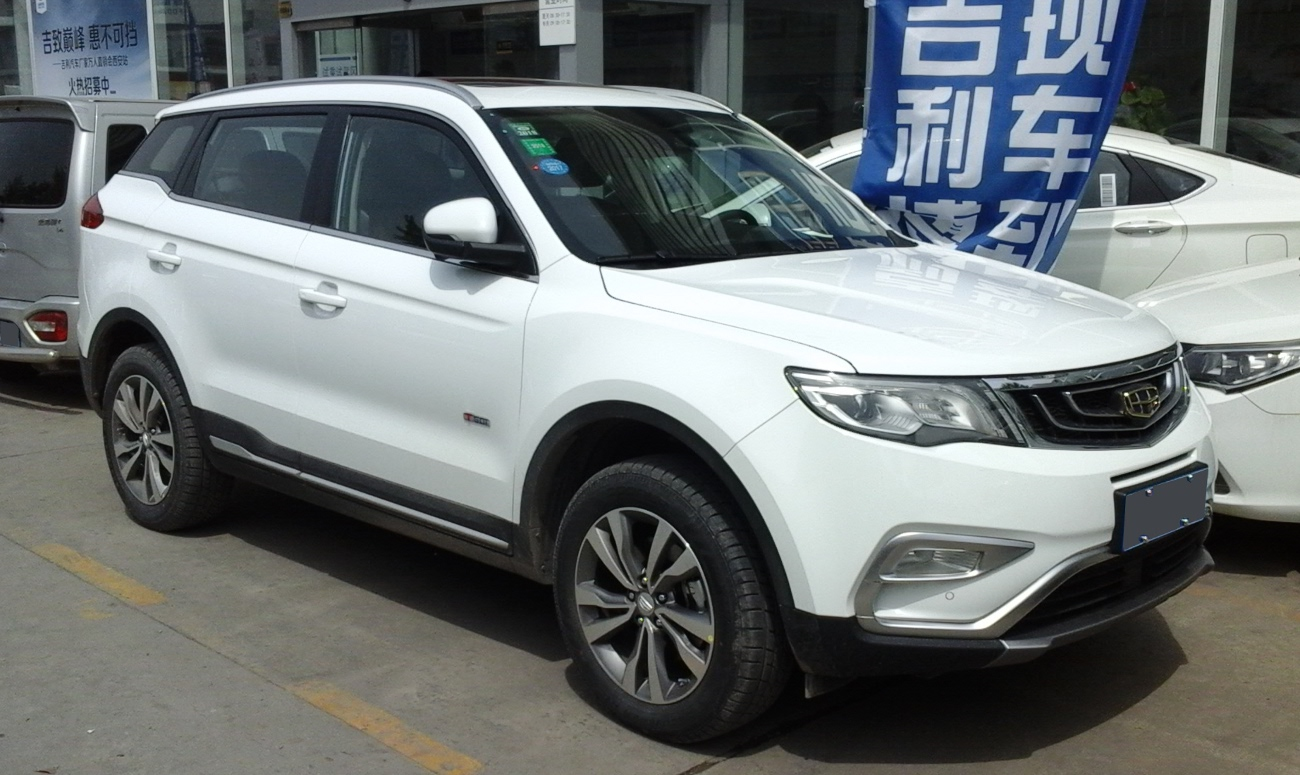
2016 Geely Boyue (pre-facelift)

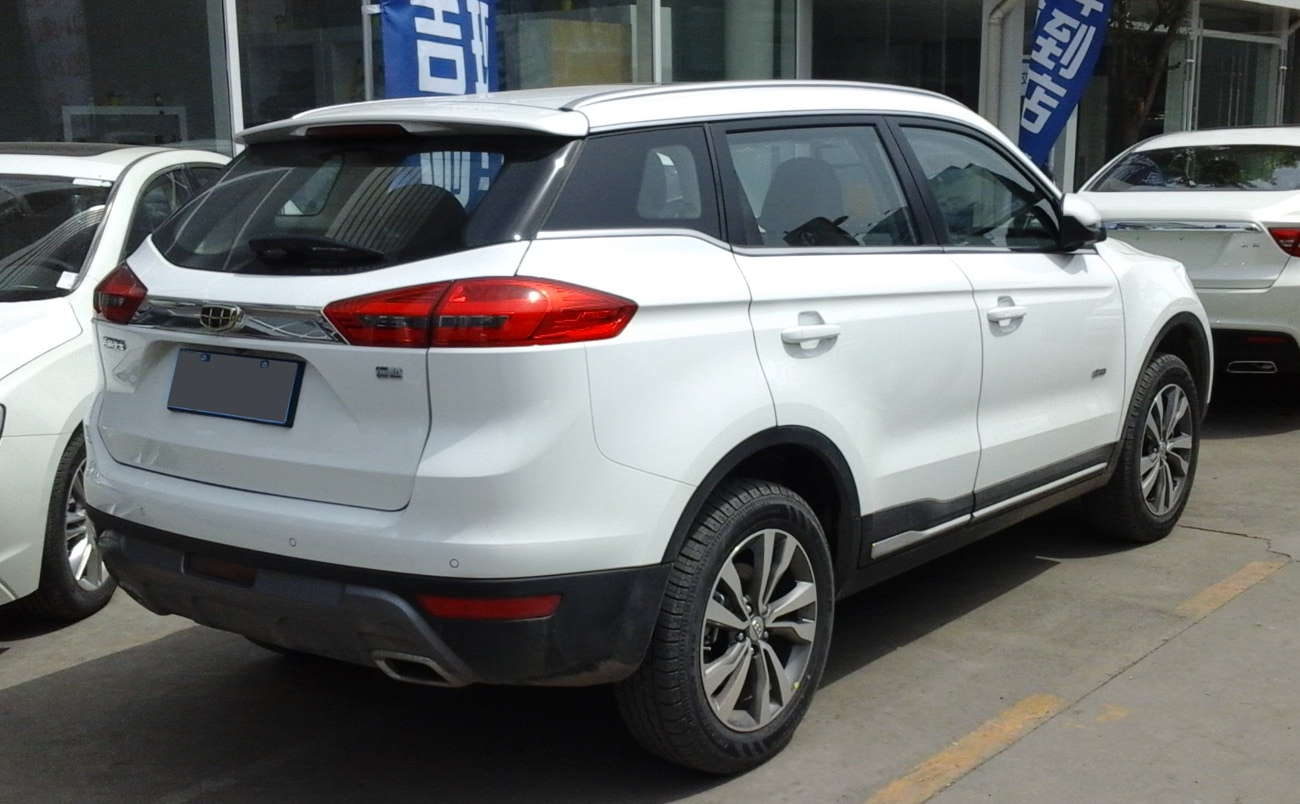
Rear view (pre-facelift)

The Boyue was designed by a team led by Peter Horbury, the vehicle's exterior design combines traditional Chinese cultural elements with modern languages of fashion. Since its launch, the Boyue has received much attention in the Chinese automobile market. The Boyue was facelifted in 2018. After 36 months, the total production number was 700,000.

=== Running changes ===
==== 2018 facelift ====
The original Geely Boyue received an update in January 2018 featuring restyled front bumper, slightly revised rear and new color options.

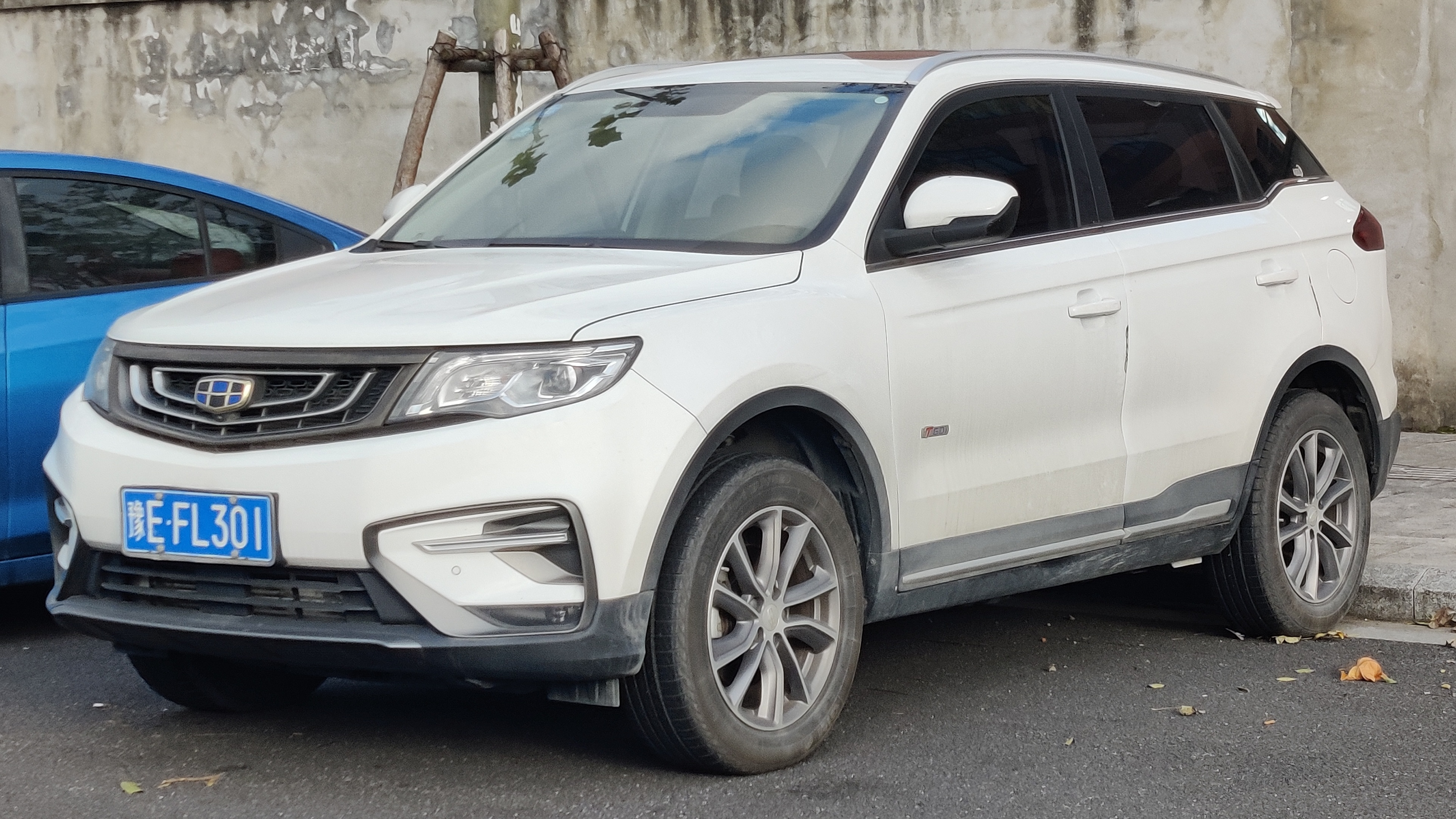
2018 Geely Boyue (first facelift)

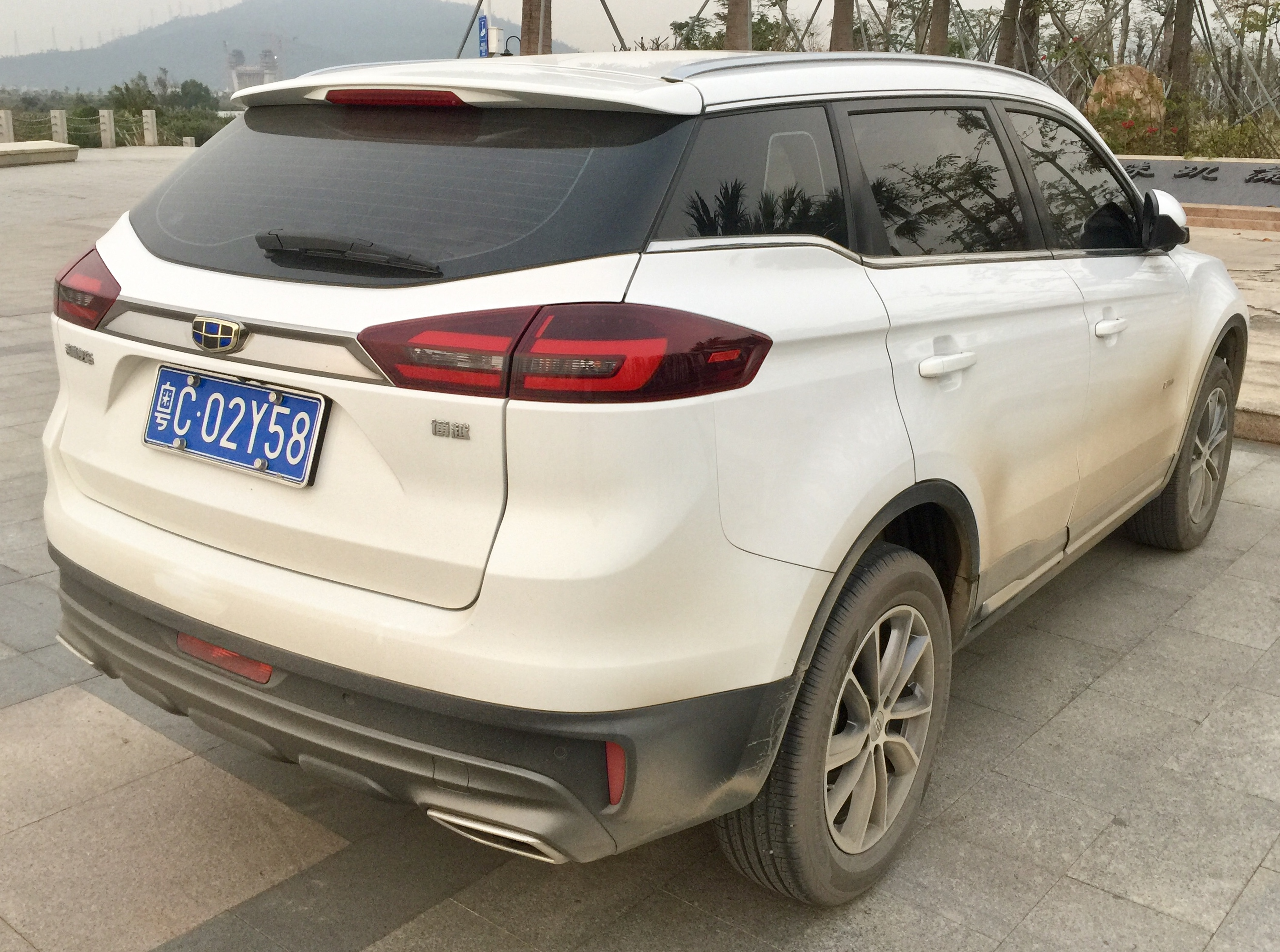
Rear view (first facelift)

=== Proton X70 ===
On 24 May 2017, Proton Holdings parent company DRB-HICOM announced plans to sell a 49.9% stake in Proton to Zhejiang Geely Automobile Holdings. Alongside the sale of stake, it was announced that Proton's first SUV would be based on the Geely Boyue. The Proton X70 launched in Malaysia in December 2018.

It was fully imported from China and featured only minor cosmetic changes inside and out. The most apparent change is that the Proton X70 is right-hand drive while the Geely Boyue is a left-hand drive vehicle. Proton started the local assembly of the X70 in December 2019 with the launch in February 2020. The Proton X70 was launched in Pakistan in December 2020.

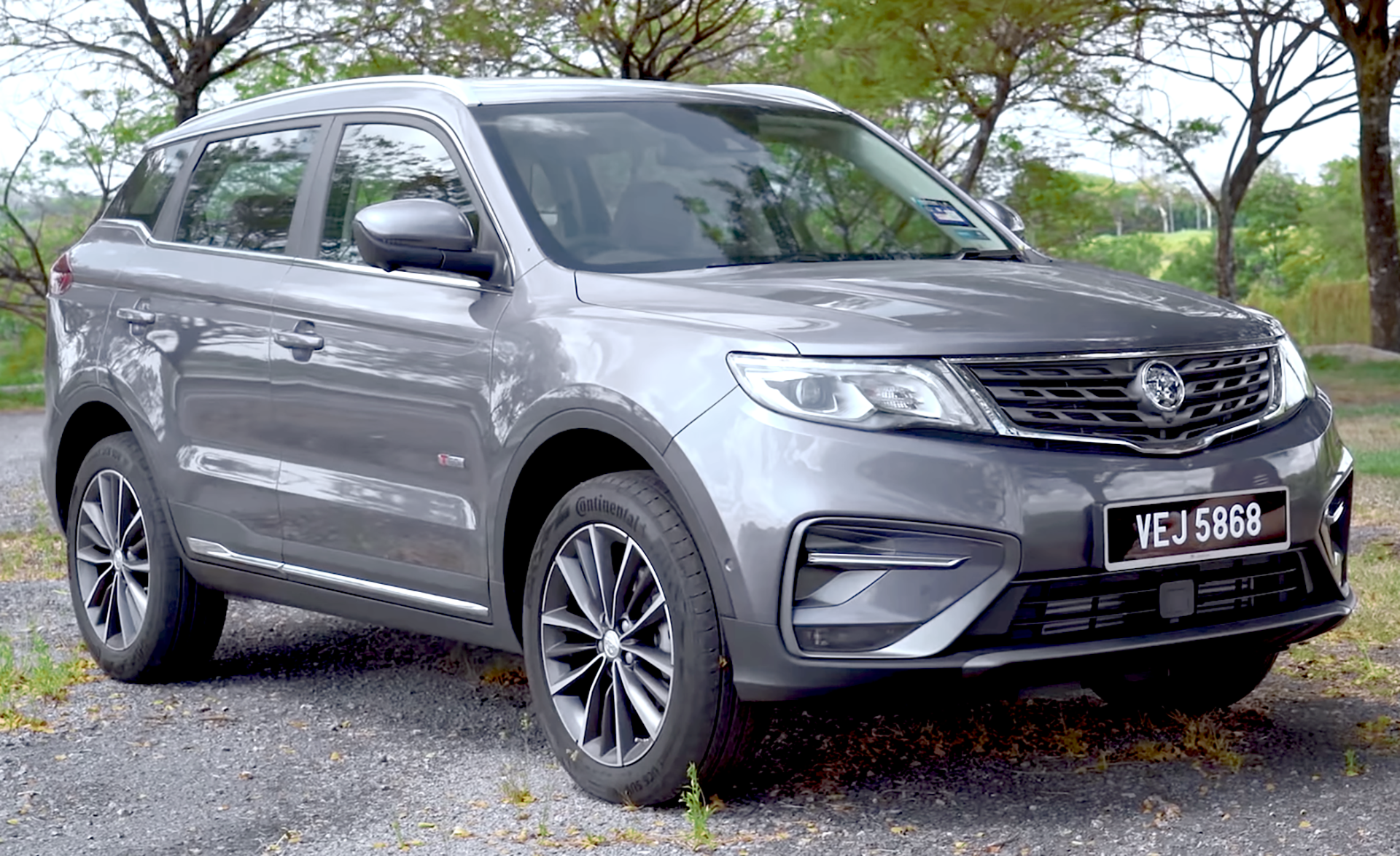
Front view

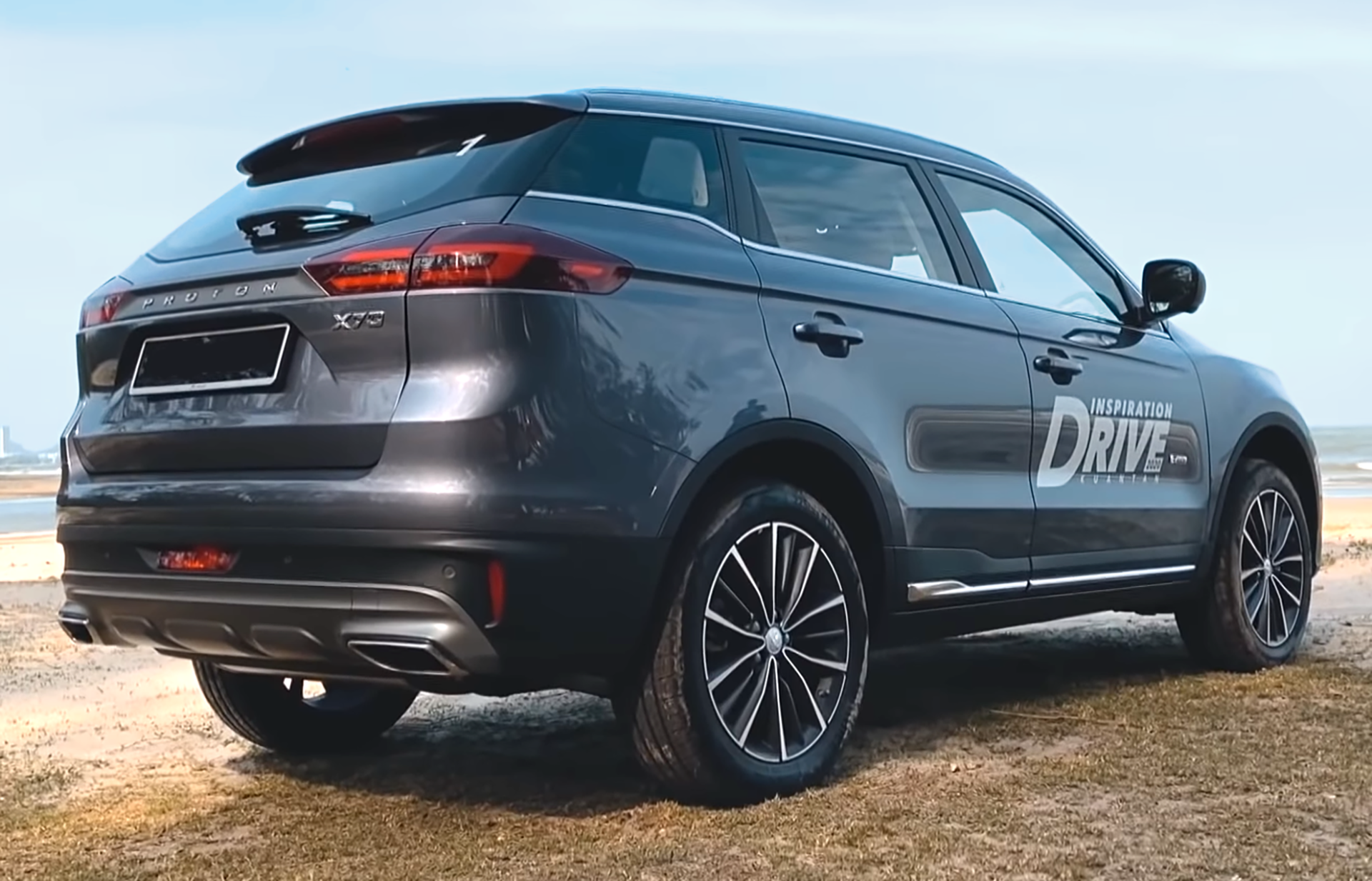
Rear view

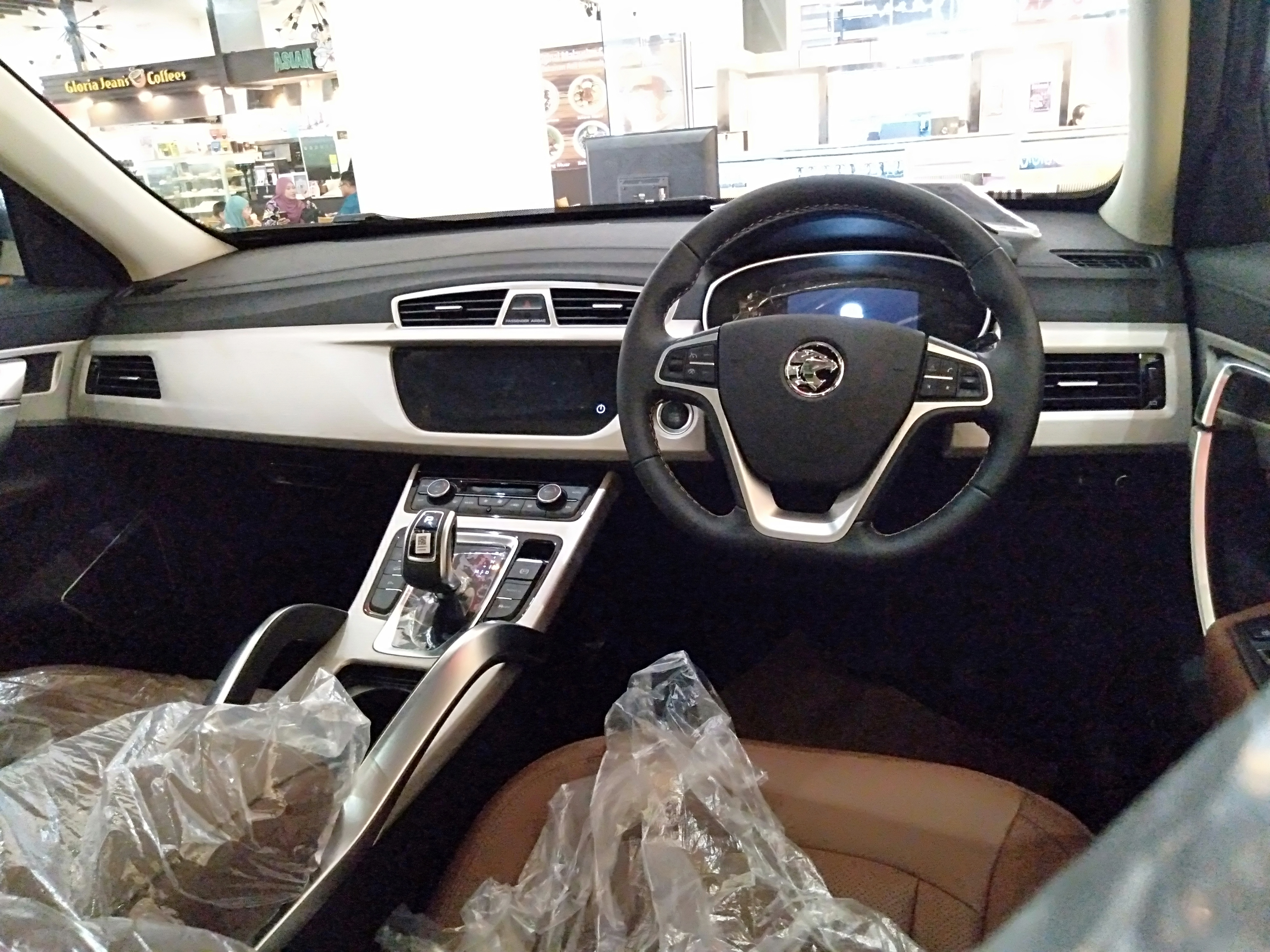
Interior

== Second generation (NL-3B; 2019) ==
Second generation
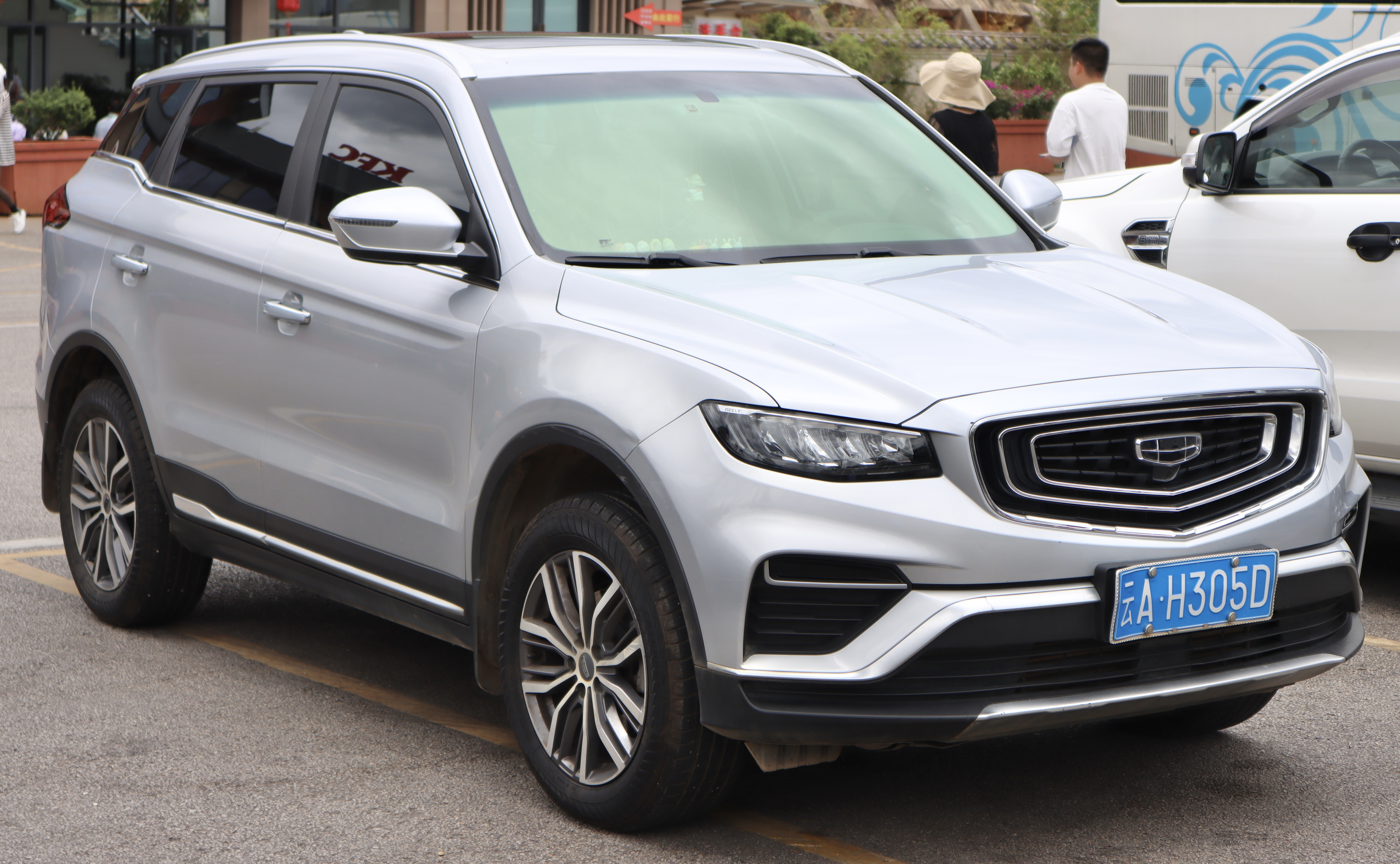
- Geely Boyue Pro (second generation)

Overview
- Model code: NL-3B
- Also called: Geely Atlas Pro; Geely Azkarra (Boyue Pro, global, Atlas Pro); Farizon FX (pickup version); BelGee X70 (Belarus); Proton X70 (Malaysia)
- Production: 2019–2025; 2019–2022 (China); 2024–present (BelGee X70); 2024–present (Proton X70)
- Assembly: China: Baoji, Shaanxi; Ningbo, Zhejiang; Belarus: Zhodzina (BelGee); Malaysia: Tanjung Malim, Proton City, Perak (PTMSB, X70)

Body and chassis
- Platform: Geely NL
- Related: Geely Borui

Powertrain
- Engine: Petrol: 1.5 L 3G15TDB G-Power turbo I3; 1.8 L 4G18TDB G-Power turbo I4; 2.0 L 4G20 I4; 2.4 L JLD-4G24 I4 (Middle East)
- Transmission: 6-speed manual 6-speed automatic 7-speed dual-clutch

Dimensions
- Wheelbase: 2,670 mm (105.1 in)
- Length: 4,544 mm (178.9 in)
- Width: 1,831 mm (72.1 in)
- Height: 1,694 mm (66.7 in)
- Curb weight: 1,685–1,745 kg (3,715–3,847 lb)

Chronology
- Successor: Geely Boyue Cool; Geely Boyue L Radar RD6 (for Farizon FX)

=== Boyue Pro / Azkarra (2019, NL-3B) ===
In July 2019, Geely launched the second generation Boyue dubbed as Boyue Pro, debuting in China and exported to some overseas markets as the Geely Azkarra. Model code NL-3B, the Boyue Pro updated design features restyled front and rear end designs. The Boyue Pro interior features the GKUI19 infotainment system, updated cabin design and a new 1.8-litre turbocharged four-cylinder engine updated to meet new emission standards with a new option of 1.5-litre turbo three-cylinder engine that co-developed with Volvo which is shared with the Geely Binyue.

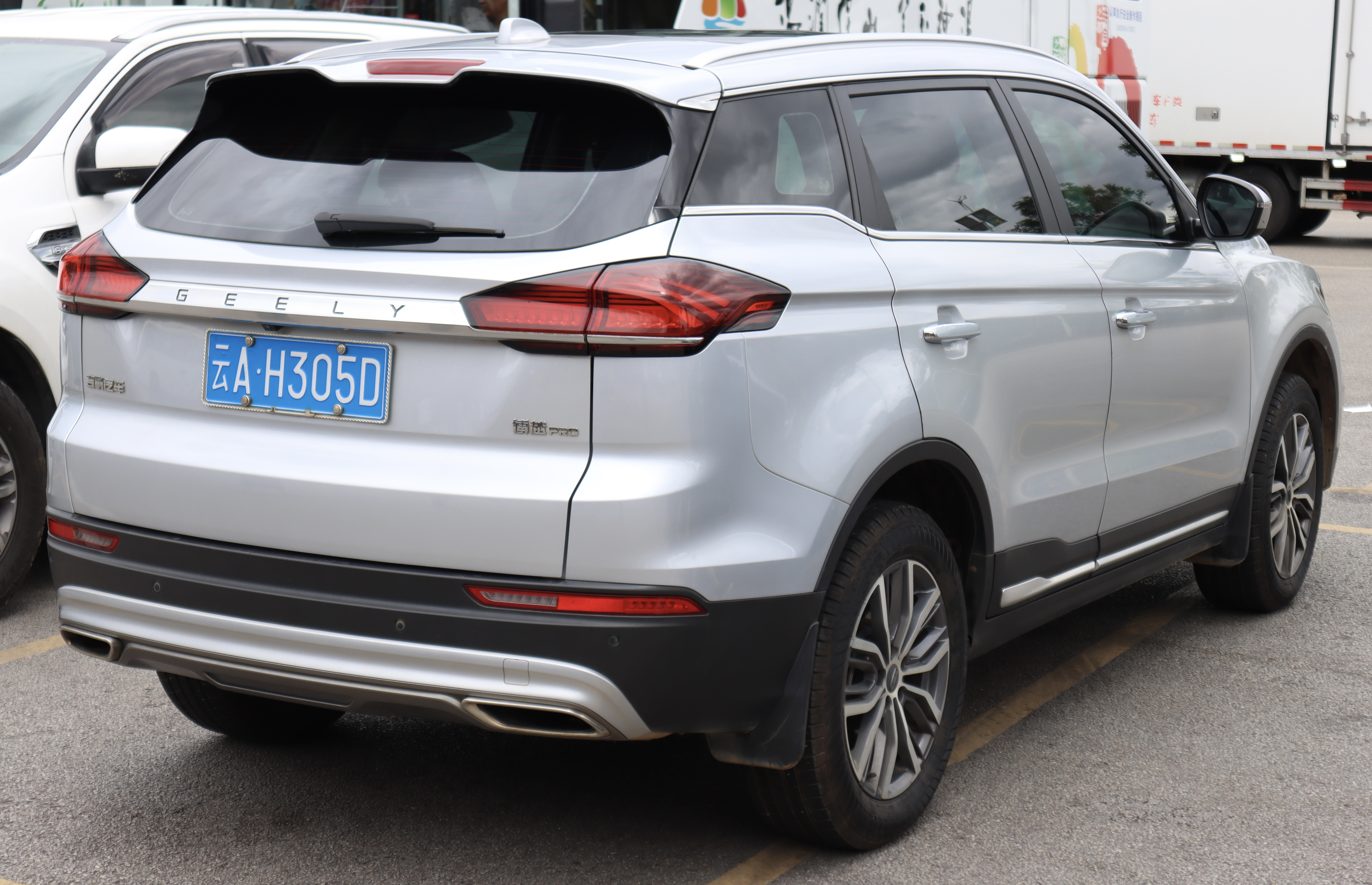
Rear view

=== Boyue X (2021) ===
The Boyue X was unveiled at the 2021 Chengdu Auto Show as an updated version of the Boyue Pro introduced over two years ago. The Boyue X is equipped with the same powertrain as the Boyue Pro while the front and rear end received redesigns as the first model introduced with Geely's Vision Starburst design language. In October 2021, Geely launched the Boyue X in China with two engine options and a substantial amount of kit.

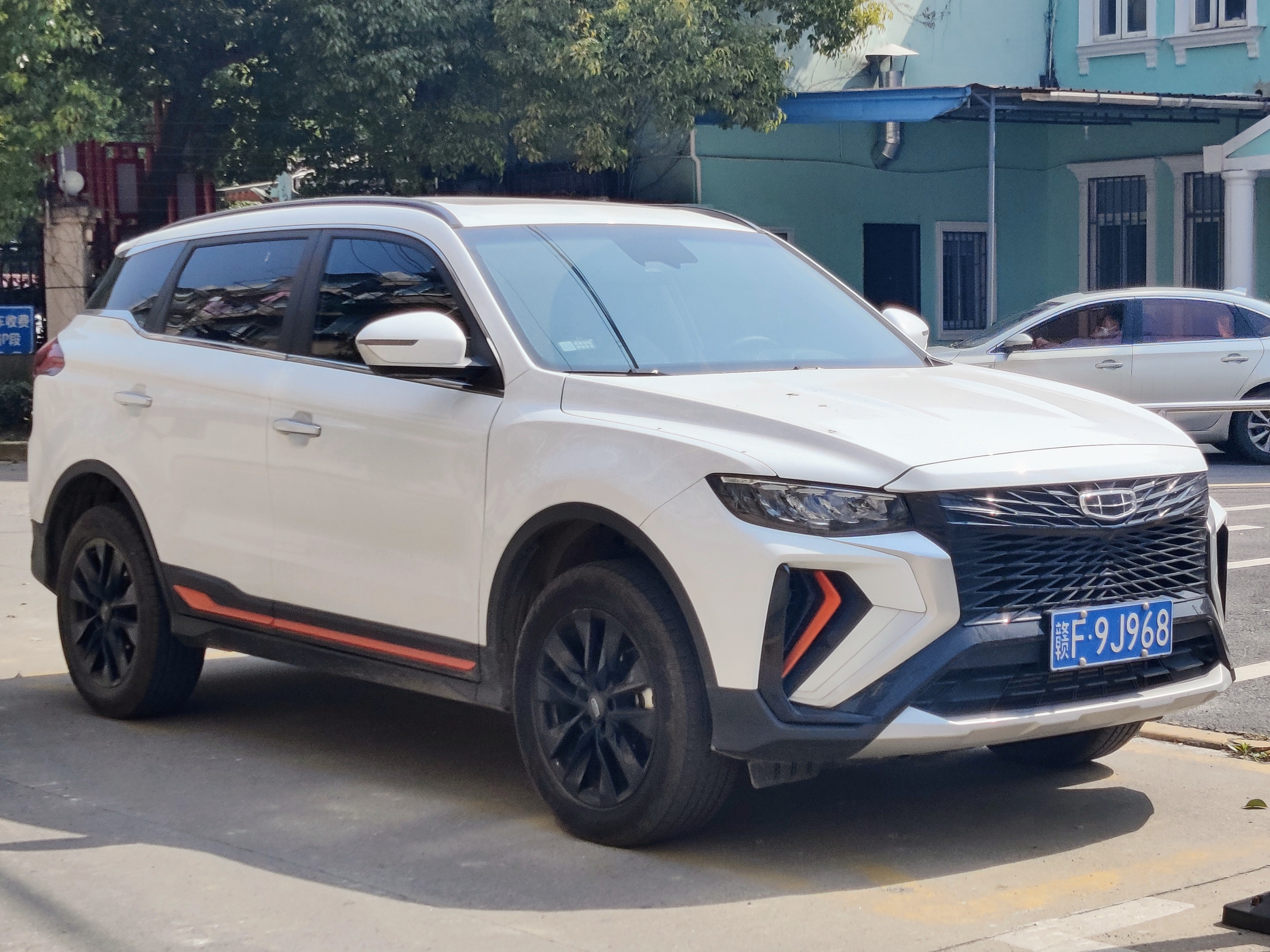
Front view

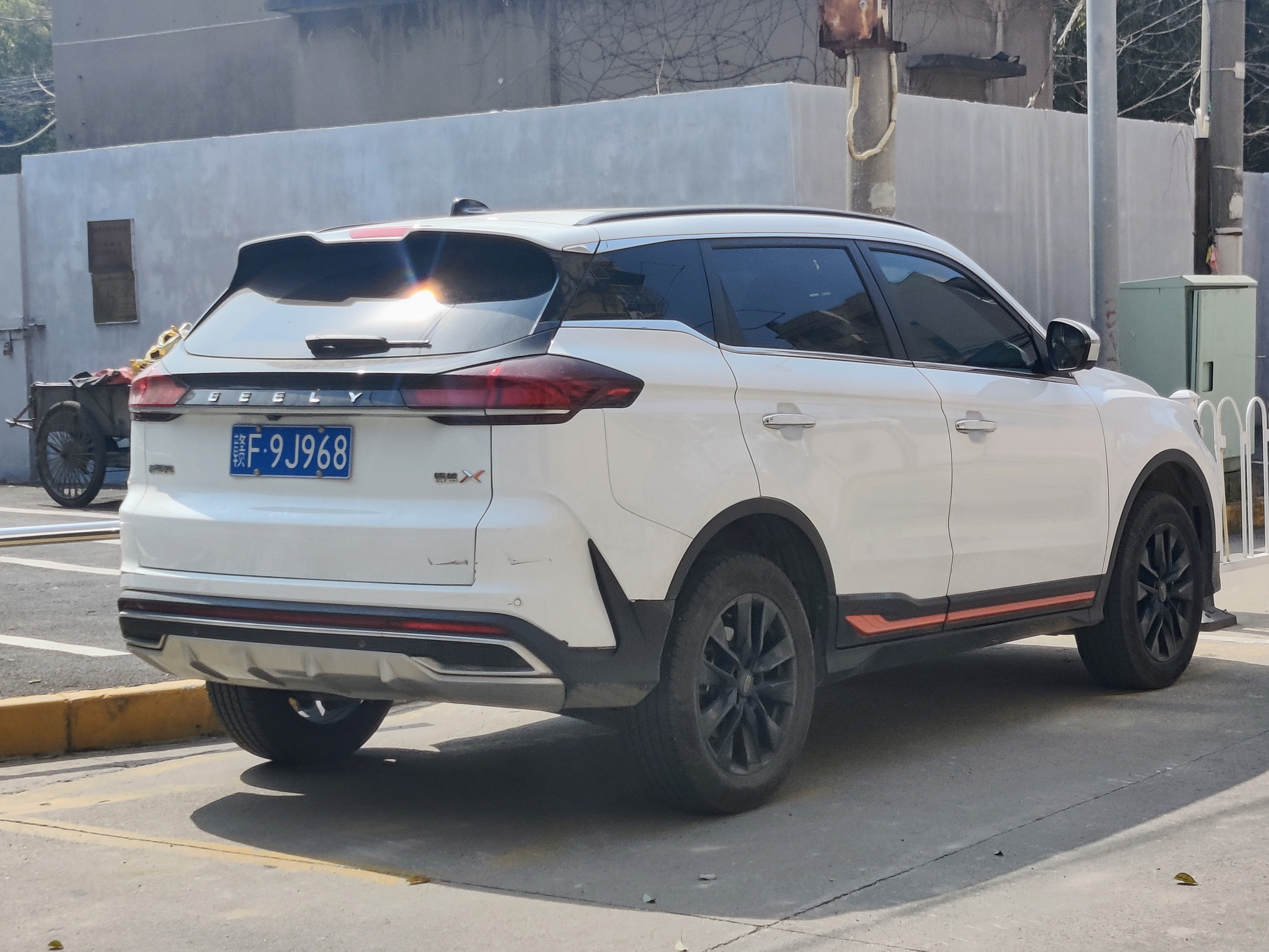
Rear view

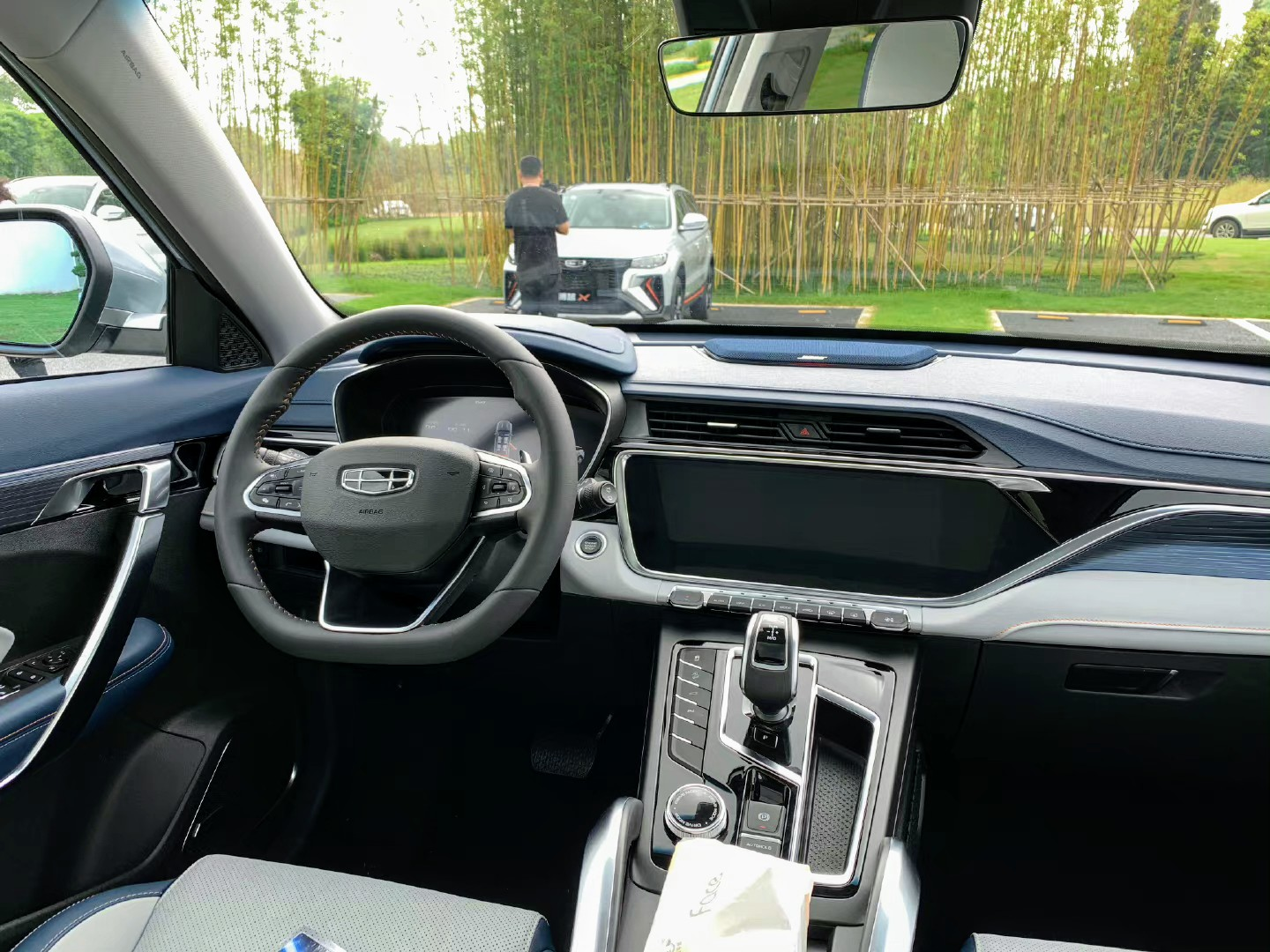
Interior

=== 2021 Asian Games Edition ===
Despite the introduction of the Boyue Pro in 2019 and the Boyue X in 2021 replacing the Pro, a special edition of the original Boyue remains to be available on the market as the Asian Games Edition as of 2021.

=== 2022 facelift ===
In April 2022, the original Boyue received a facelift for the 2022 model year featuring the same front fascia as the Boyue Pro with an updated vertical slotted grille insert and updated interior while the rear end remains to be the same as the previous version. The 2022 model year Boyue was sold alongside the Boyue X from the end of April 2022.

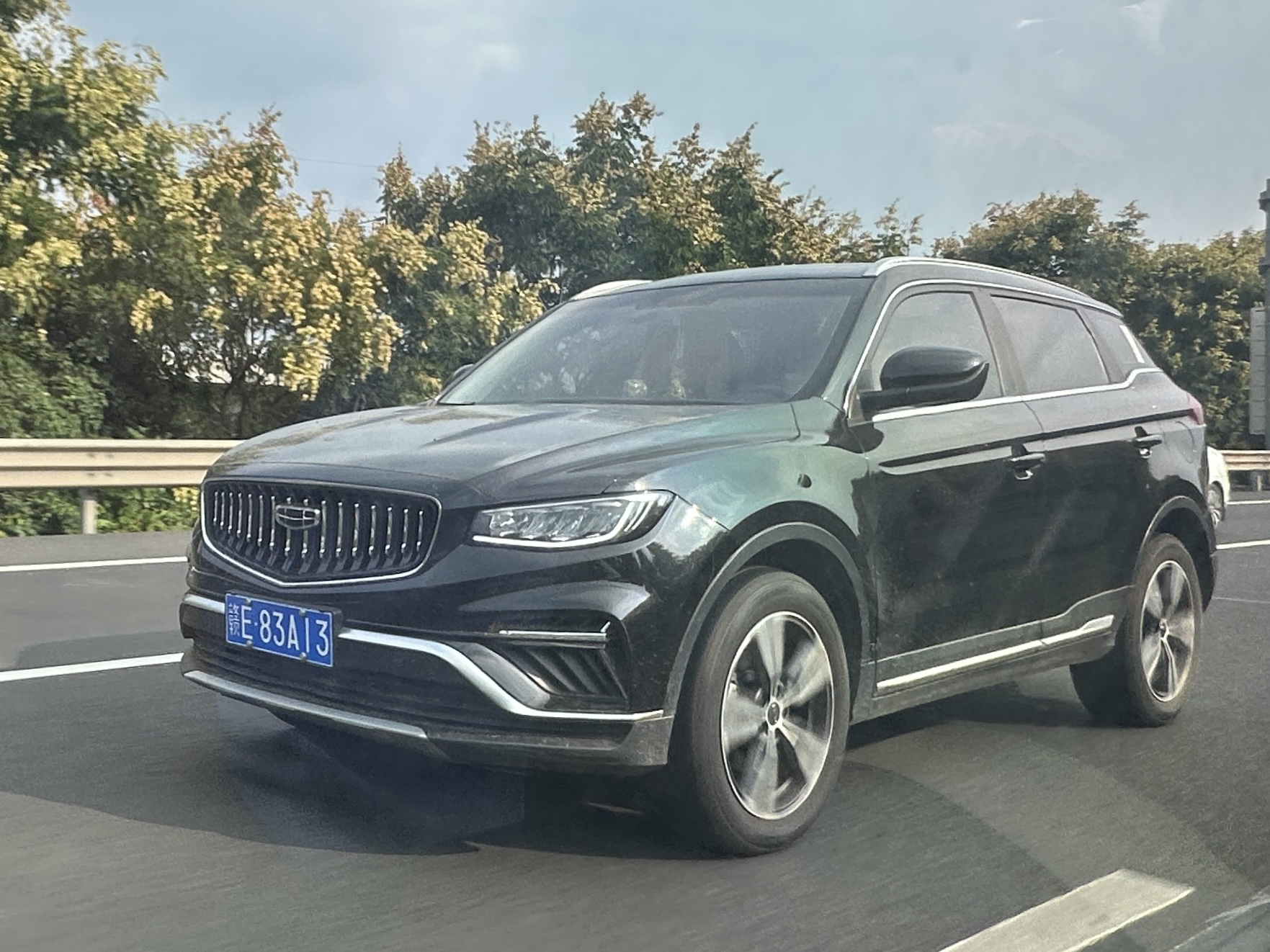
2022 Geely Boyue (second facelift)

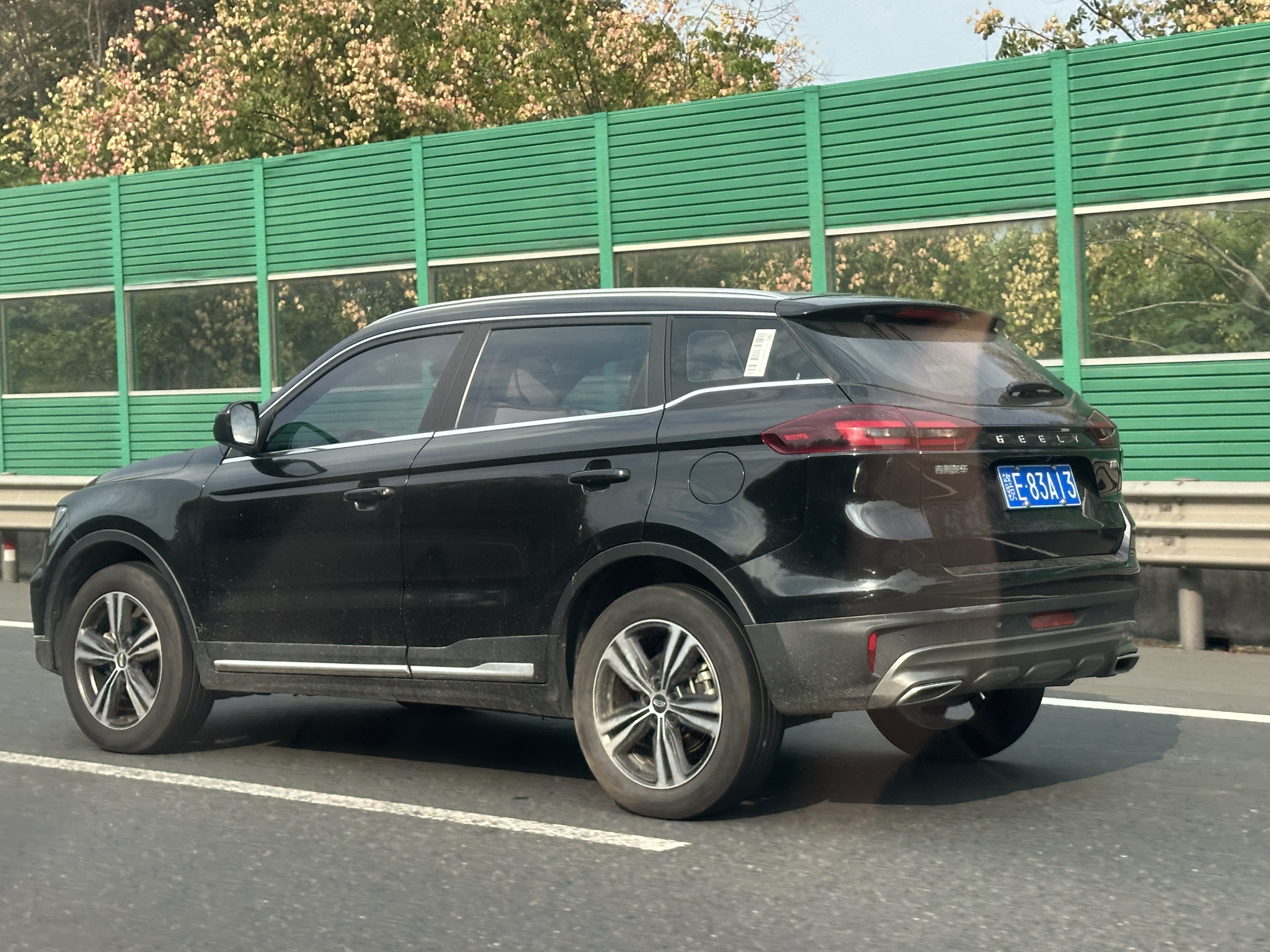
Rear view (second facelift)

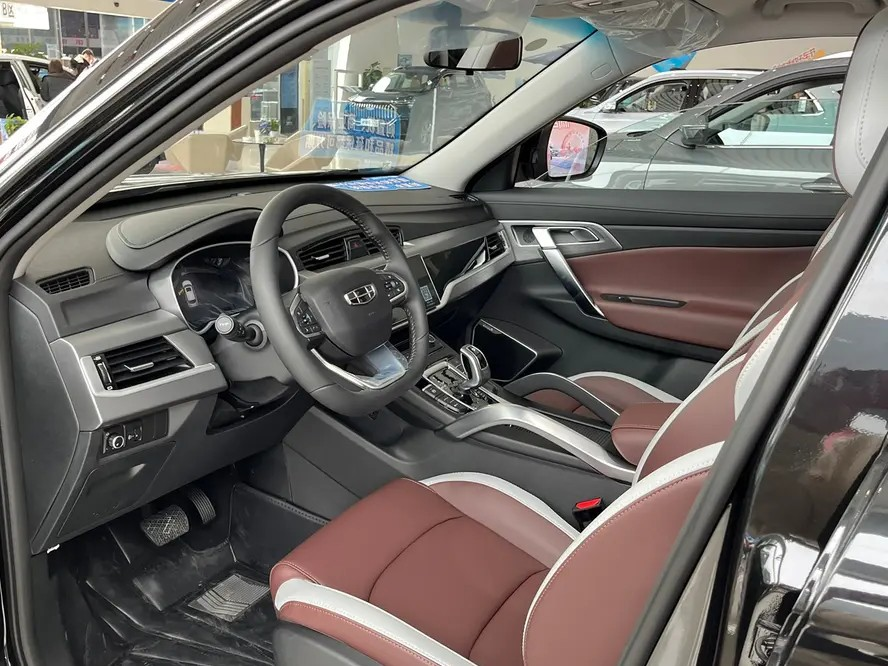
Interior

=== Farizon FX ===
The Farizon FX is a 4-door pickup truck based on the Boyue Pro sold from 2020. It features a monocoque design instead of a traditional ladder frame layout like most pickup trucks. It is powered by the same 1.8-litre turbo engine for the Boyue Pro. The truck is claimed to be the first car-based truck in China.

The design of the Farizon FX retains the Boyue Pro's front fascia except the Expanding Cosmos grille. The rear is replaced by a truck bed with an integrated sport bar, wood flooring and a tonneau cover. The interior is largely different from its counterpart, as it has a larger centre console and a slightly different dashboard layout.

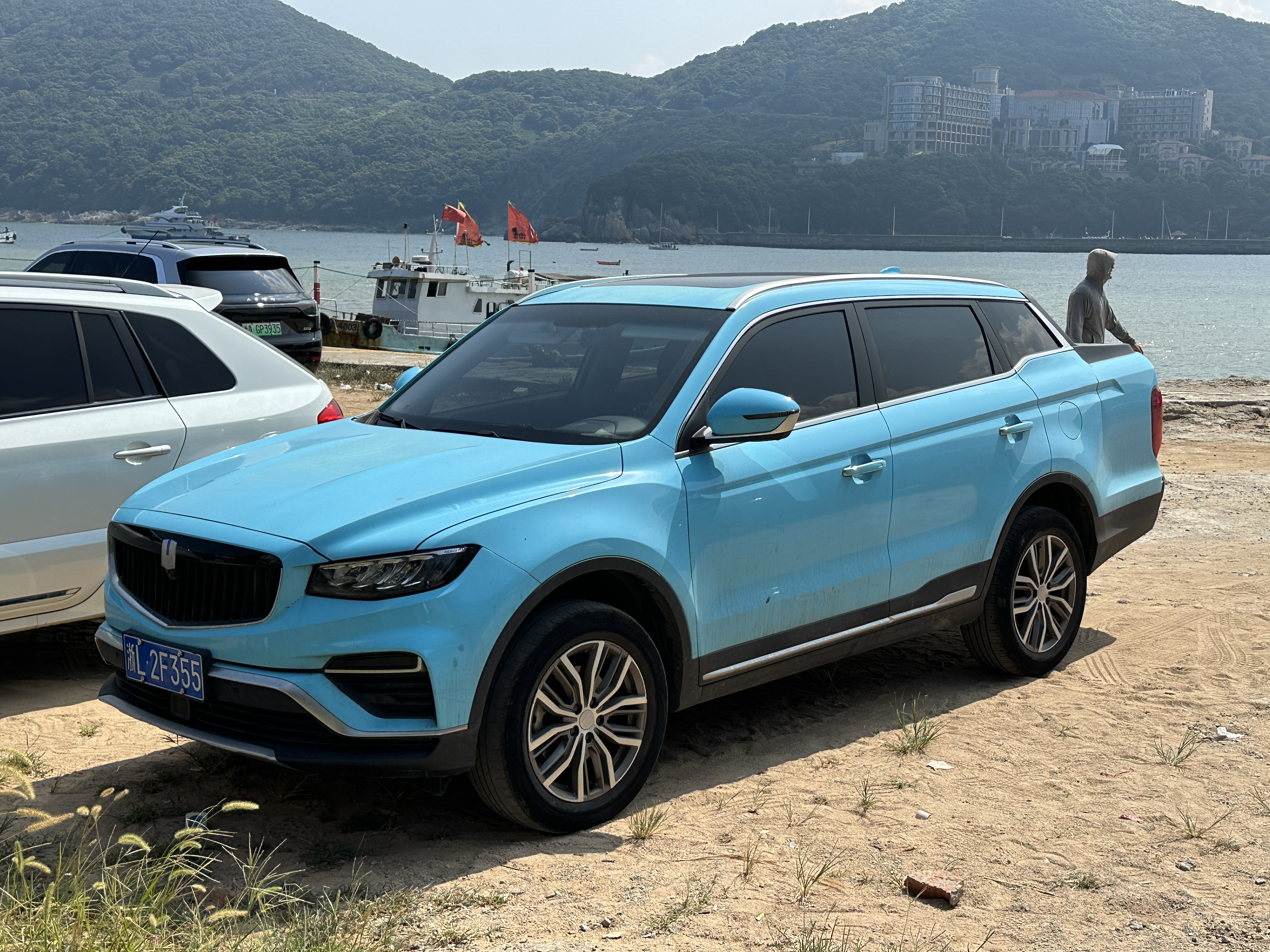
Front view

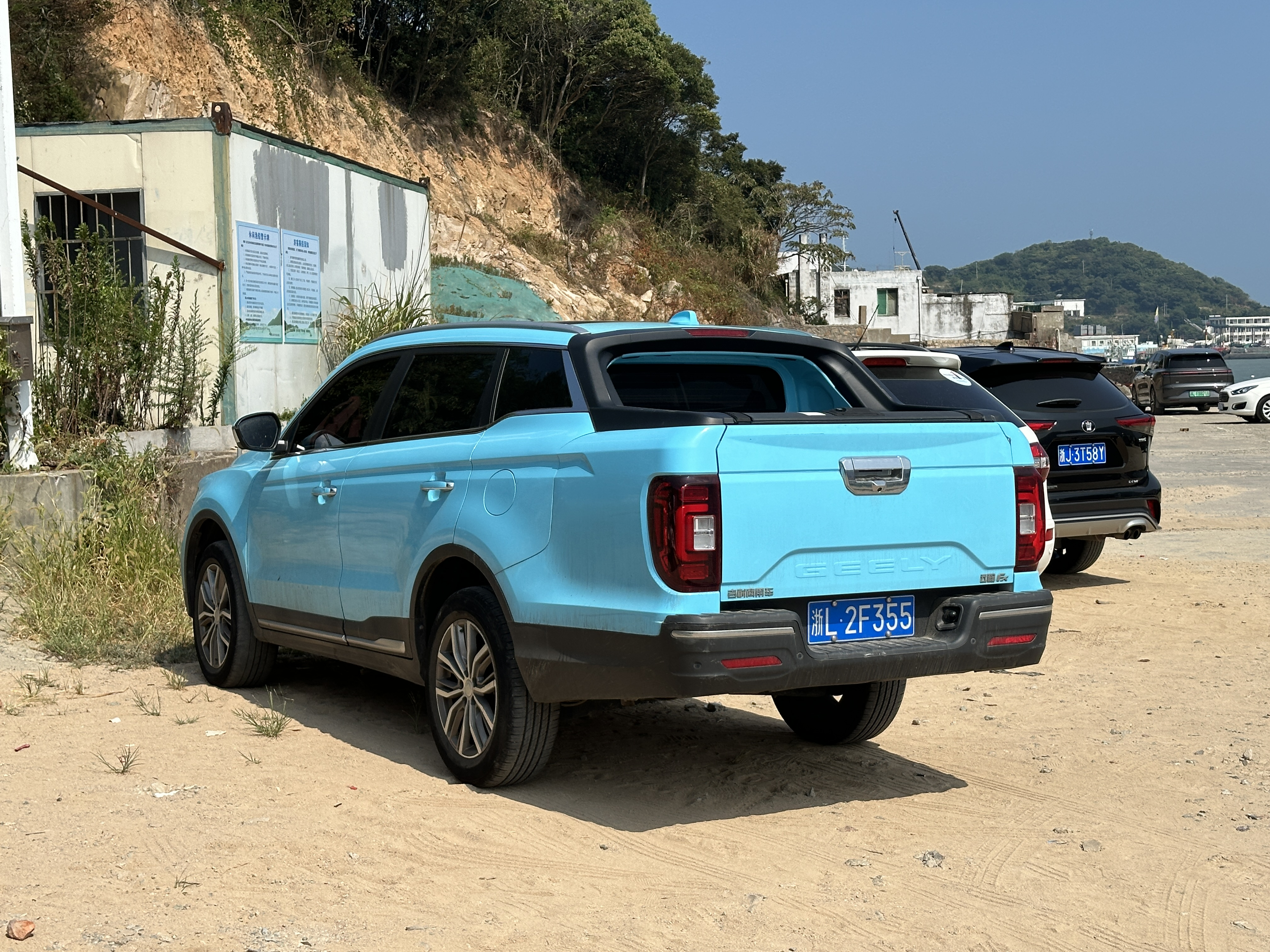
Rear view

== Third generation (FX11; 2022) ==
In August 2022, Geely introduced the Boyue L, a larger vehicle within the Boyue lineup.

In January 2023, a smaller model called the Boyue Cool followed.

In June 2024, following the discontinuation of the first-generation Boyue in the Chinese market, the Boyue Cool was renamed back to Boyue.

=== Boyue L (FX11; 2022) ===
Third generation
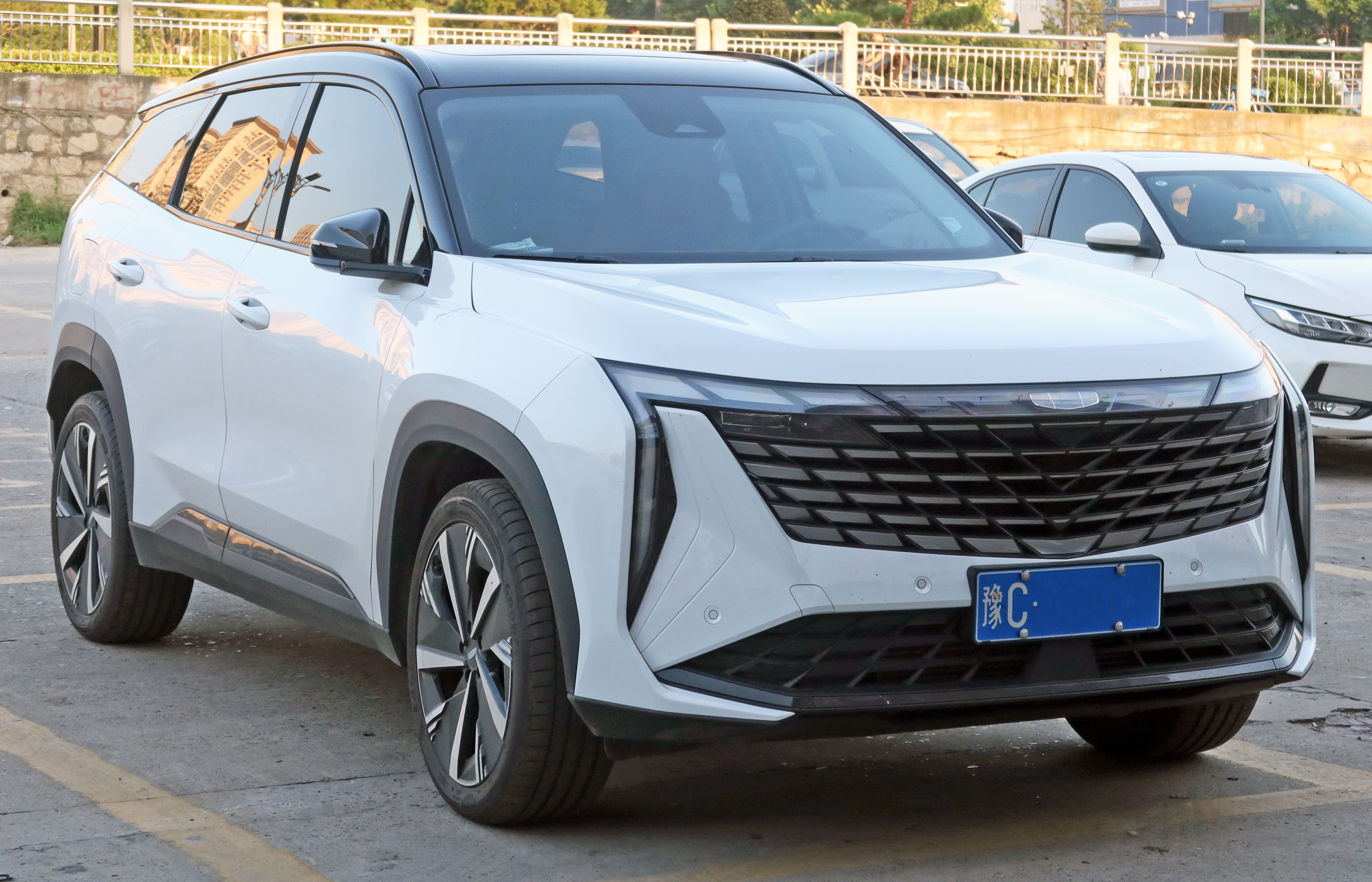
- Third generation of Boyue L

Overview
- Model code: FX11
- Also called: Geely Starray; Geely Atlas (Russia)
- Production: September 2022 – present; 2022–2025 (China)
- Assembly: China: Baoji, Shaanxi

Body and chassis
- Platform: Compact Modular Architecture
- Related: Geely Galaxy L7; Geely Galaxy M7

Powertrain
- Engine: Petrol: 2.0 L JLH-4G20TDJ turbo I4; 1.5 L BHE15-EFZ turbo I4; Petrol hybrid: 1.5 L DHE15-ESZ turbo I3; Petrol plug-in hybrid: 1.5 L BHE15-BFZ turbo I4
- Transmission: 6-speed manual; 6-speed automatic; 3-speed DHT (HEV/PHEV); 7-speed dual-clutch

Dimensions
- Wheelbase: 2,777 mm (109.3 in)
- Length: 4,670 mm (183.9 in)
- Width: 1,900 mm (74.8 in)
- Height: 1,705–1,710 mm (67.1–67.3 in)
- Curb weight: 1,565–1,745 kg (3,450–3,847 lb)

The Boyue L was unveiled in August 2022, codenamed FX11 during development and rides on the CMA platform shared with the Xingyue and Xingyue L. When the vehicle was introduced, the Boyue L is positioned between the first-generation Boyue and Xingyue L. In 2023, the Boyue Cool takes the position below the Boyue L. In 2024, the first-generation Boyue was discontinued in China, and the Boyue Cool was renamed to simply Boyue. In export markets, the Boyue L is marketed as the Geely Starray or Geely Atlas.

The power of the Boyue L is a 2.0-litre turbo engine with 218 hp (163 kW; 221 PS) and 325 N⋅m (240 lb⋅ft; 33 kg⋅m), a 1.5-litre turbo engine with 181 hp (135 kW; 184 PS) and 290 N⋅m (214 lb⋅ft; 30 kg⋅m), a 1.5-litre turbo engine plus 3DHT Hybrid Electric drivetrain, and a 1.5-litre turbo engine plus 3DHT Plug-in Hybrid Electric drivetrain. The 2.0-litre turbo engines and 1.5-litre turbo engines are matched to a 7-speed DCT gearbox, the hybrid powertrains are mated to Geely's DHT three-speed hybrid electric drive transmission.

The dashboard of the Boyue L features a 13.2-inch horizontal central touch screen, a 10.25-inch digital instrument cluster, and a four-spoke squared steering wheel. The operating system is Geely Galaxy OS Air and enables OTA updates with computing power comes from a Qualcomm Snapdragon 8155 chip.

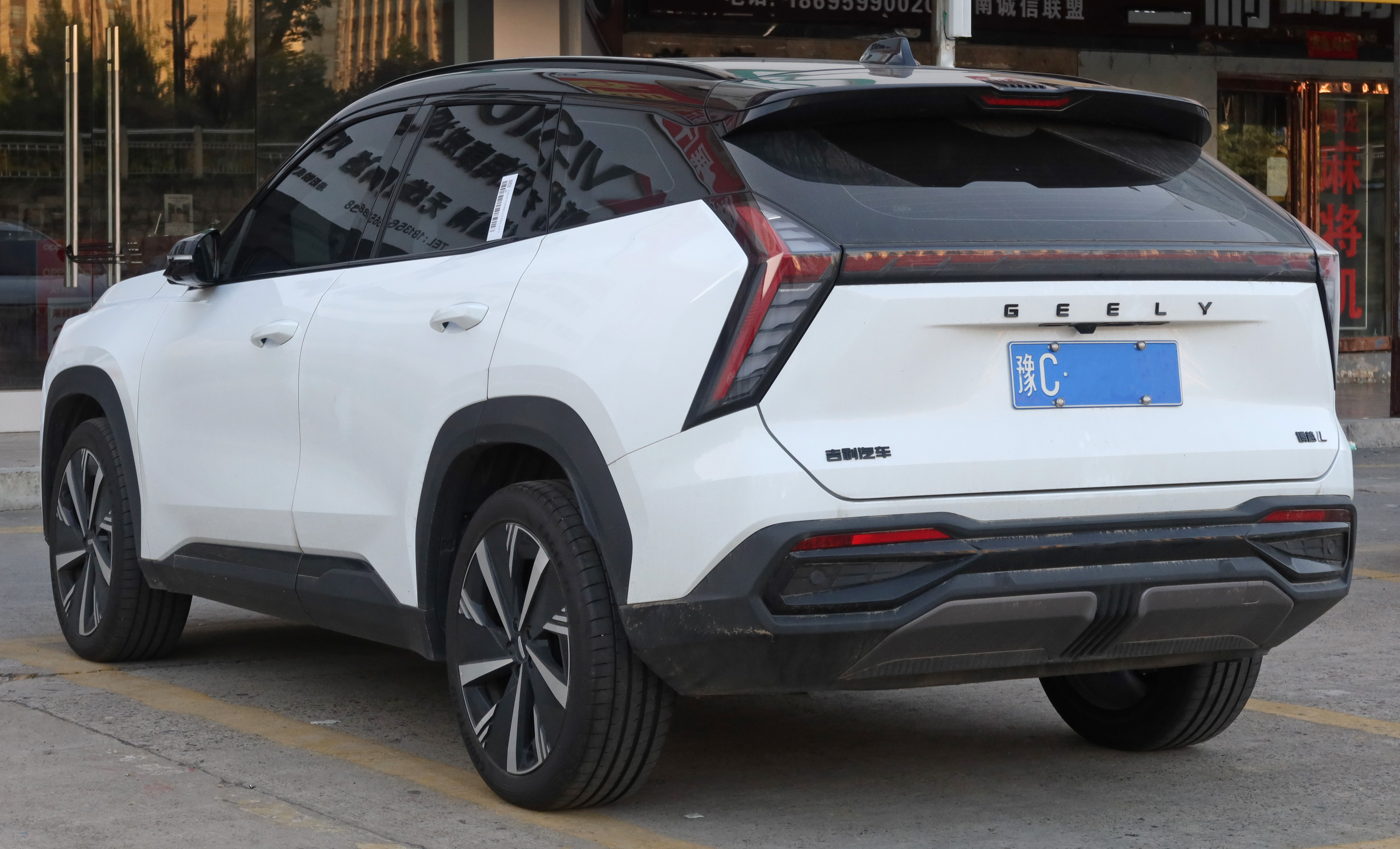
Rear view

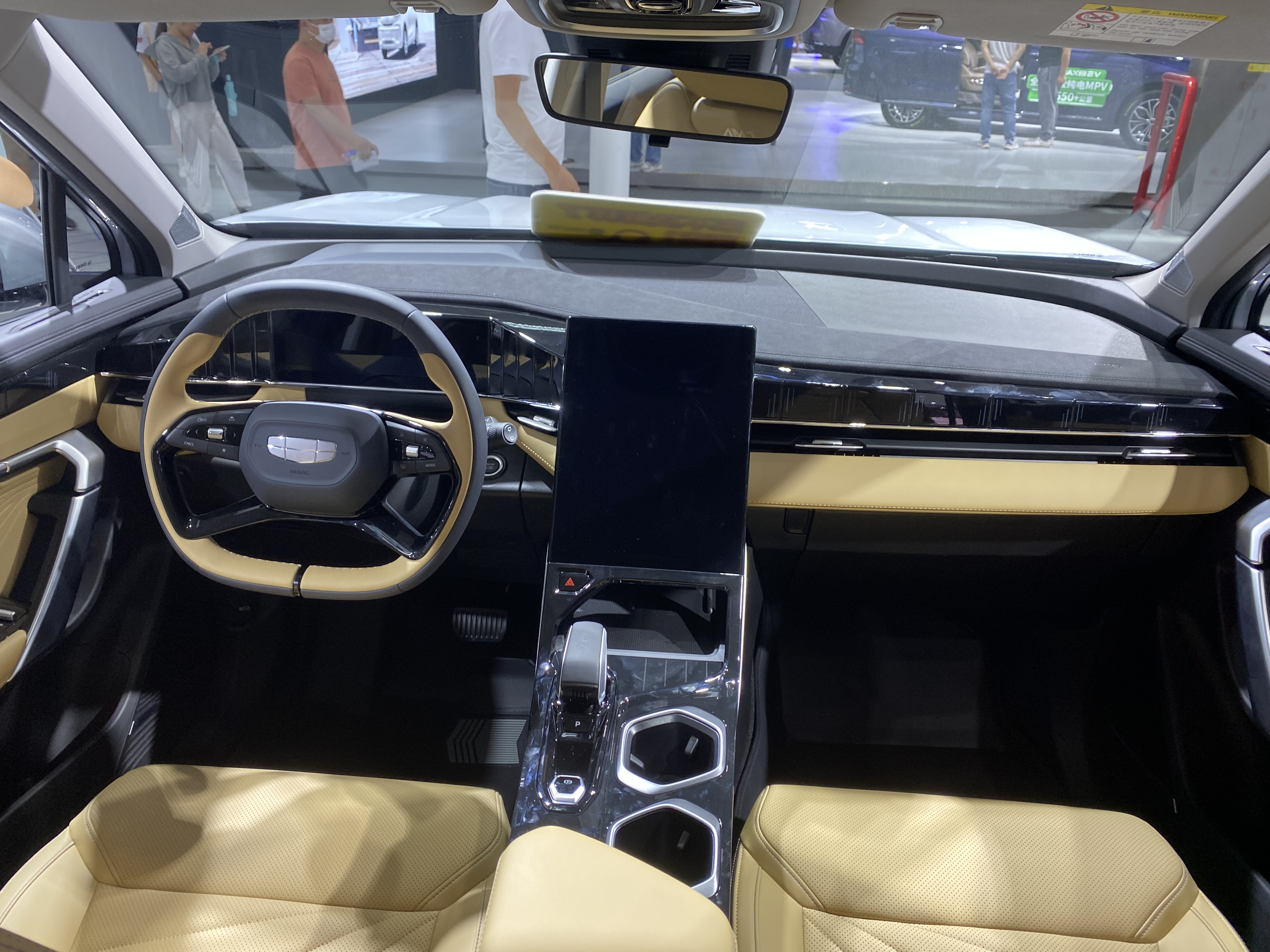
Interior

==== Geely Galaxy L7 & M7 ====
The Geely Galaxy L7 and M7 are the plug-in hybrid variants of the Geely Boyue L that is marketed through Geely Galaxy dealership network.

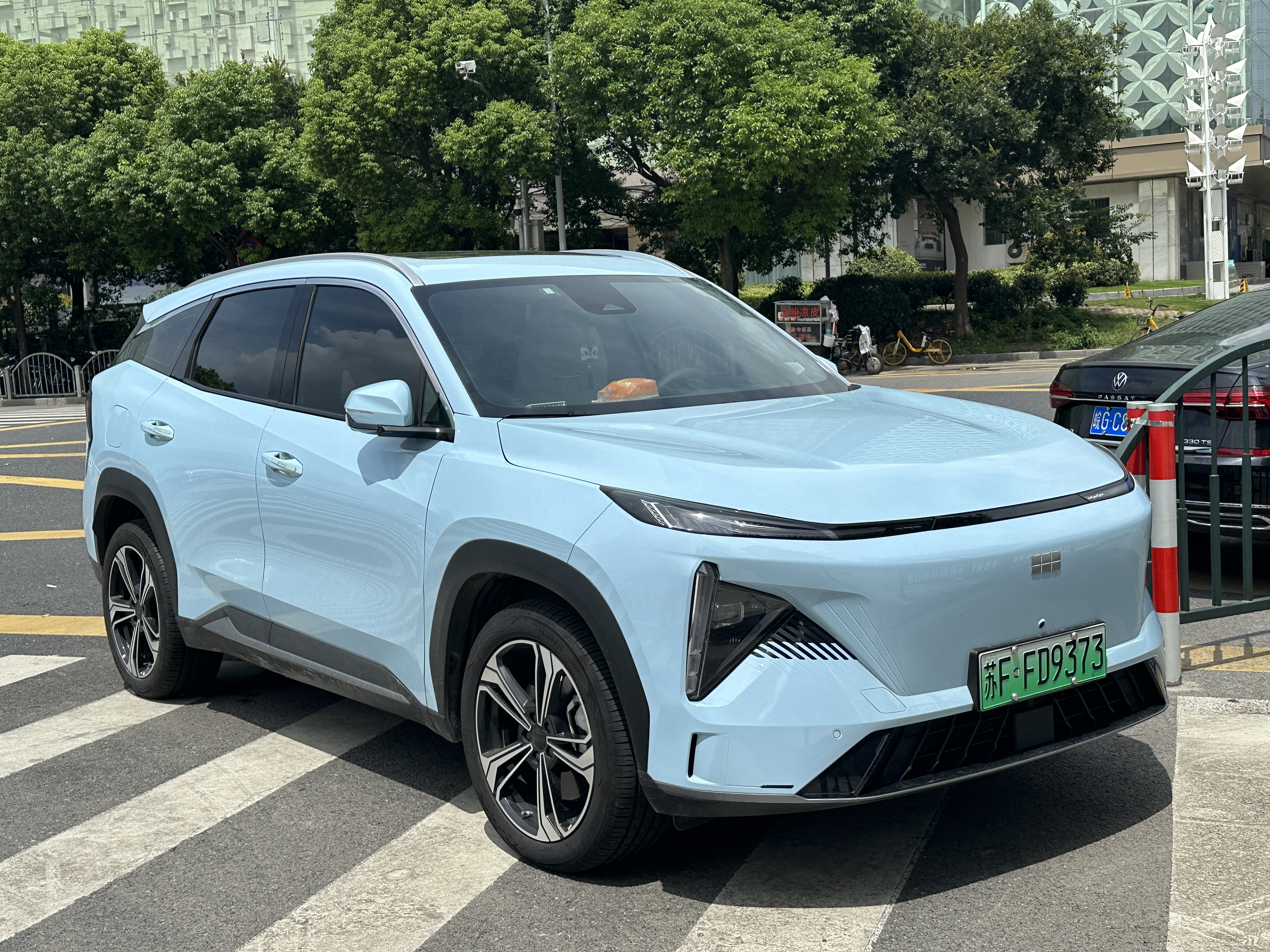
Geely Galaxy L7

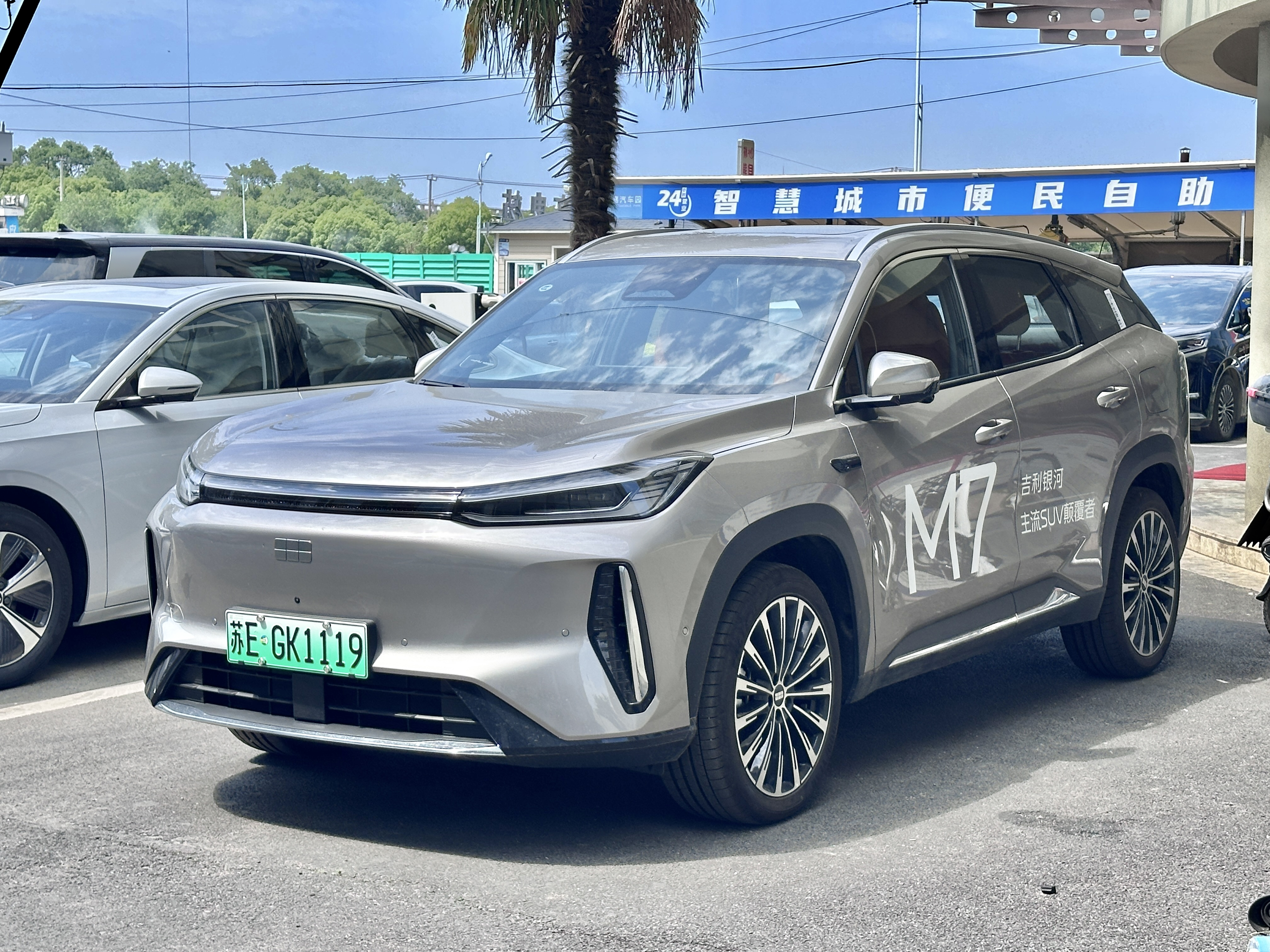
Geely Galaxy M7

== Fourth generation (2025) ==
Fourth generation
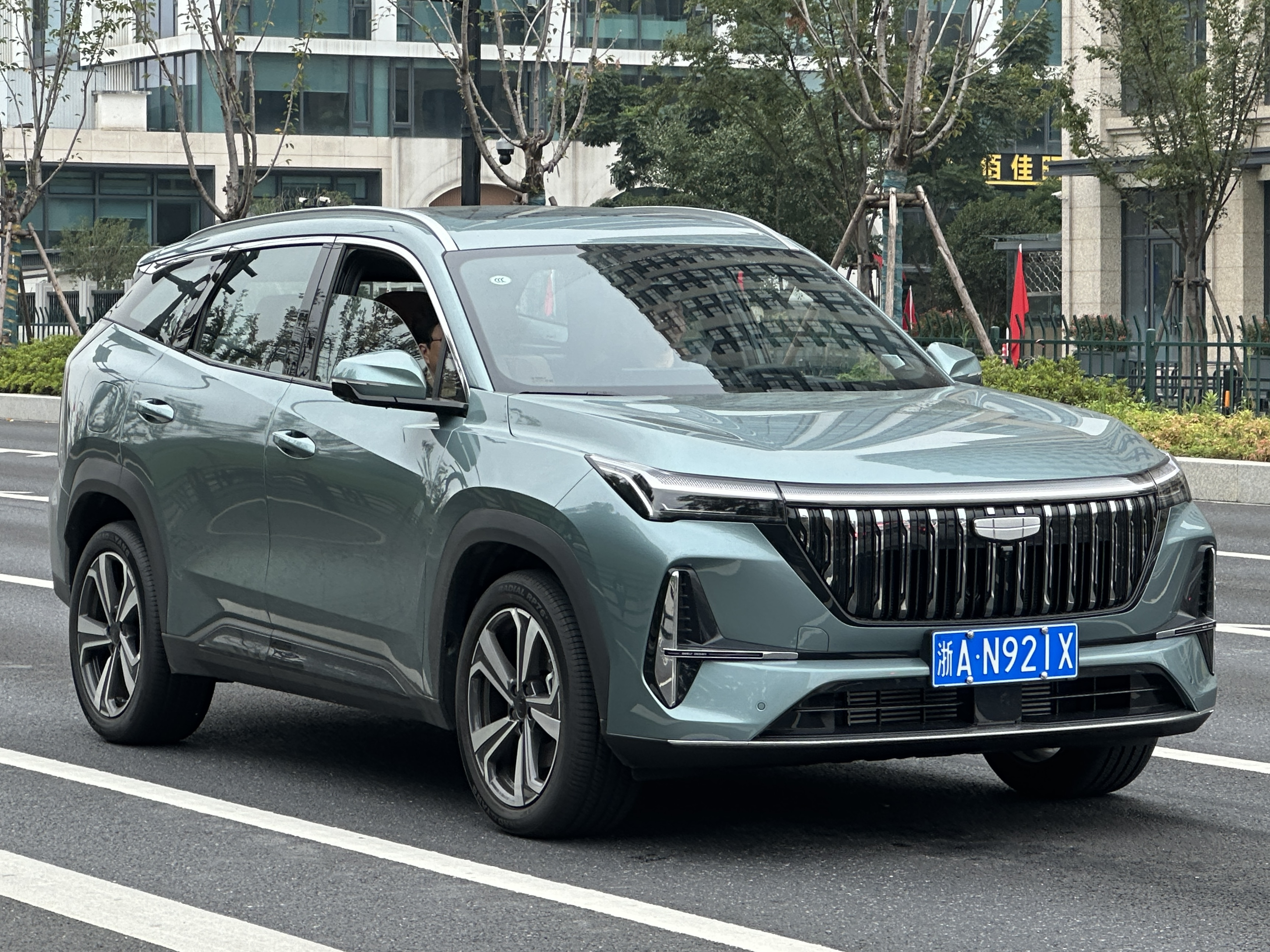

Overview
- Also called: Volga K40 (Russia)
- Production: 2025–present
- Assembly: China: Baoji, Shaanxi

Body and chassis
- Platform: Compact Modular Architecture
- Related: Geely Galaxy L7; Geely Galaxy M7

Powertrain
- Engine: Petrol: 2.0 L JLH-4G20TDJ turbo I4; 1.5 L BHE15-BFZ turbo I4
- Transmission: 7-speed dual-clutch

Dimensions
- Wheelbase: 2,785 mm (109.6 in)
- Length: 4,730 mm (186.2 in)
- Width: 1,910 mm (75.2 in)
- Height: 1,710 mm (67.3 in)
- Curb weight: 1,571–1,645 kg (3,463–3,627 lb)

The fourth generation Boyue L was released in April 2025 with revised front and rear end, which led to slightly longer dimensions, as well as redesigned interior. It adopts a newer GEEA 3.0 electronic and electrical architecture, achieving gigabit-level data transmission speeds. The dashboard received a horizontally oriented 10.25-inch digital instrument cluster display, a 15.4-inch 2.5K center infotainment display, and a 25.6-inch AR-HUD, all powered by a SiEngine Dragon Eagle-1 system on a chip. It is equipped with the Flyme Auto cockpit and Flyme OS, which is a deeply customized version of Android, as standard. It also has a 16-speaker Flyme Sound system in a 7.1.2 surround sound configuration.

It is available with the choice of either a 1.5-liter or 2.0-liter turbocharged four-cylinder petrol engines, the former outputting 133 kW (178 hp; 181 PS) and 290 N⋅m (214 lb⋅ft) of torque, and the latter of which outputs 160 kW (215 hp; 218 PS) and 325 N⋅m (240 lb⋅ft) of torque, both paired with a 7-speed wet-clutch DCT. It uses a MacPherson strut front suspension, and multilink rear suspension.

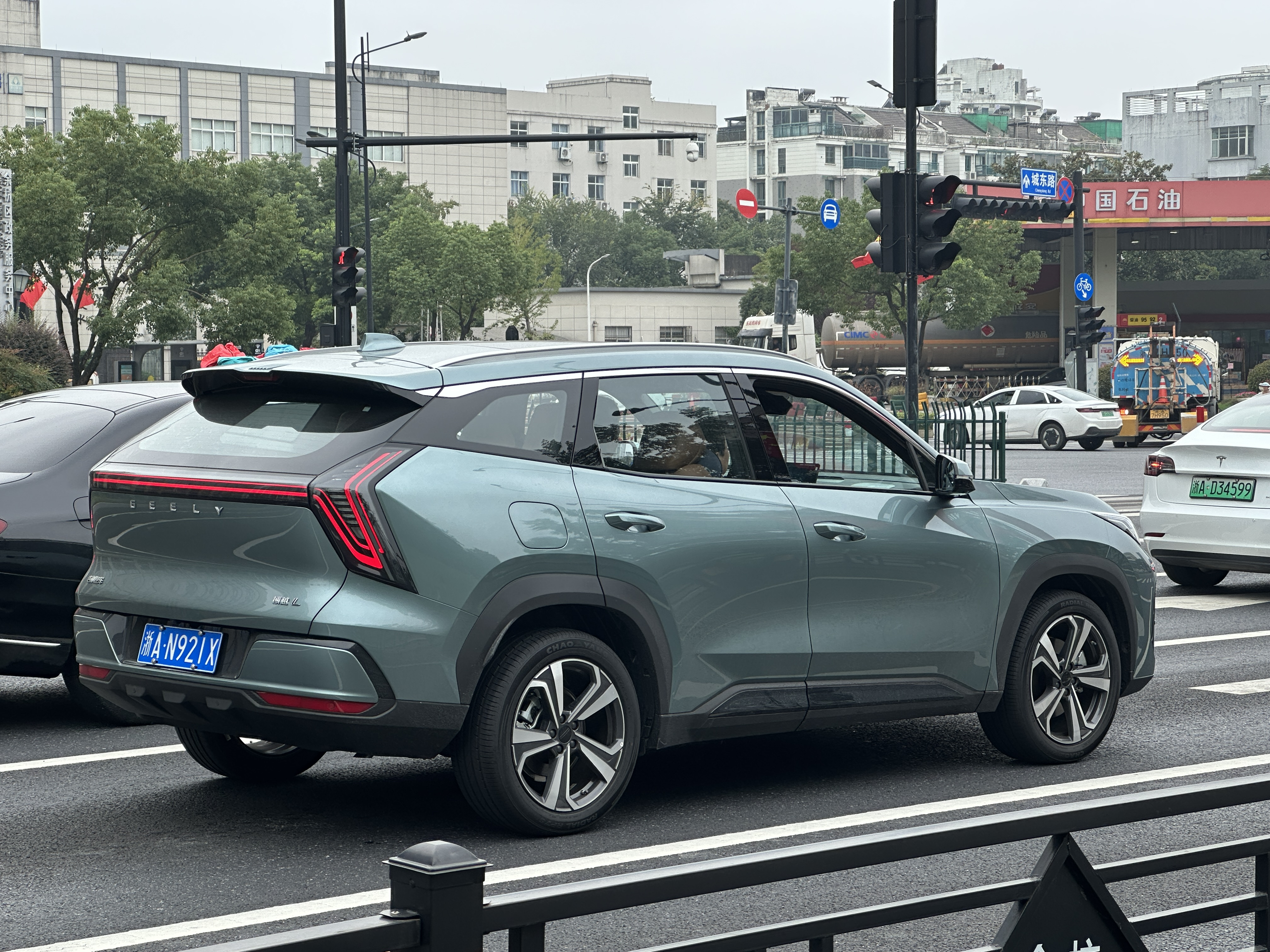
Rear view

== Boyue / Boyue Cool (G426; 2023) ==
Boyue Cool / Boyue
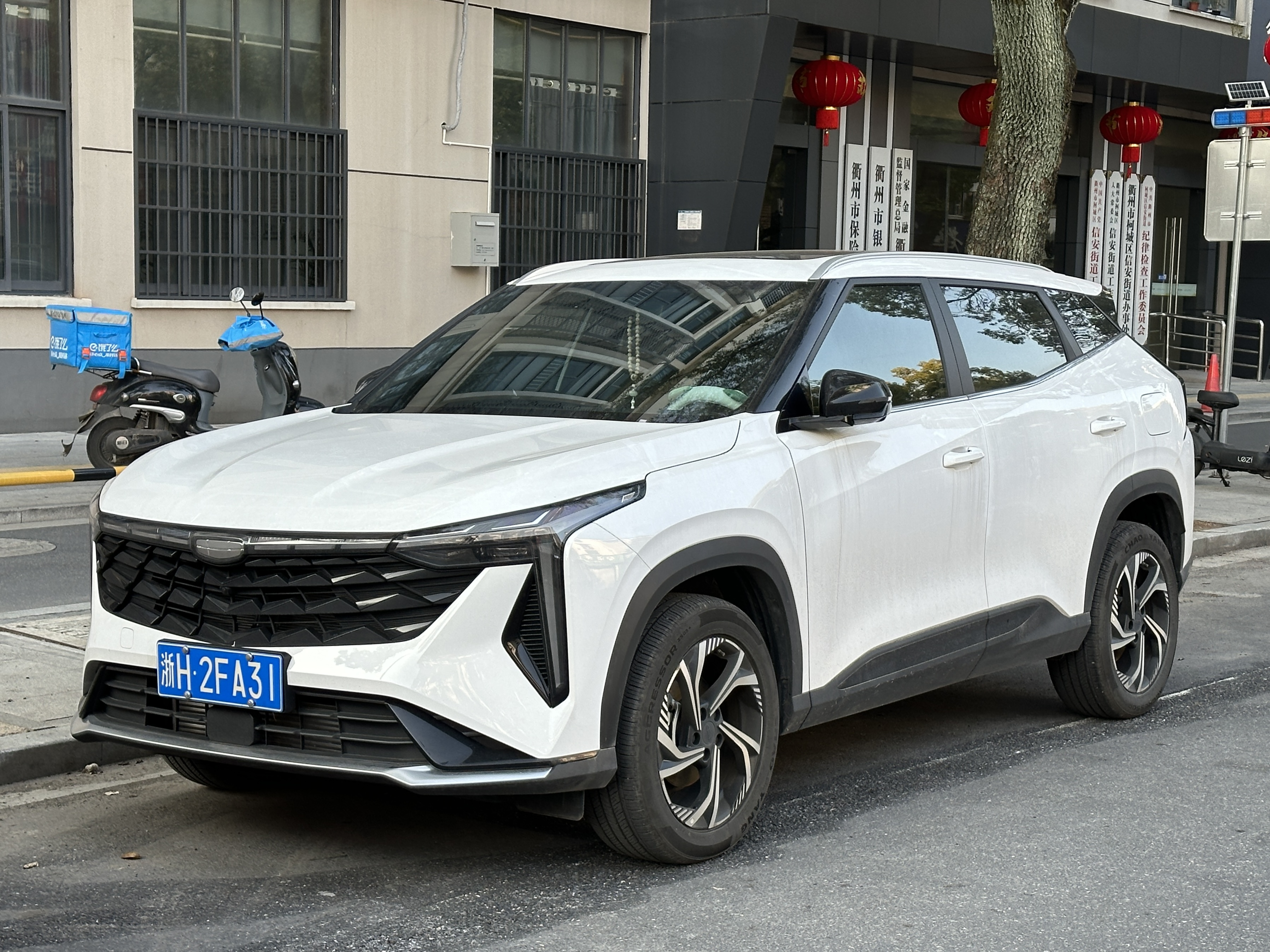
- 2023 Geely Boyue Cool

Overview
- Model code: G426
- Also called: Geely Boyue Cool (2023–2024); Geely Cityray; Geely Galaxy Cityray (Kazakhstan)
- Production: 2023–present
- Assembly: China: Xiangtan, Hunan

Body and chassis
- Platform: B-segment Modular Architecture (BMA)
- Related: Geely Binyue; Geely Icon

Powertrain
- Engine: Petrol: 1.5 L BHE15-EFZ turbo I4
- Transmission: 6-speed manual; 6-speed automatic; 3-speed DHT (Hi-F PHEV); 7-speed dual-clutch

Dimensions
- Wheelbase: 2,701 mm (106.3 in); 2,707 mm (106.6 in) (2025 facelift)
- Length: 4,510 mm (177.6 in); 4,549 mm (179.1 in) (2025 facelift); 4,570 mm (179.9 in) (2027 facelift)
- Width: 1,865 mm (73.4 in)
- Height: 1,650 mm (65.0 in); 1,635 mm (64.4 in) (2027 facelift)
- Curb weight: 1,455–1,475 kg (3,208–3,252 lb)

In January 2023, Boyue Cool (Chinese: 吉利博越Cool; pinyin: Jílì Bóyuè Cool) was launched as the smaller version of the Boyue. In June 2024, Geely renamed the vehicle to Boyue. During the development, codenamed G426, the Boyue Cool was originally developed as the Geely Binyue L, positioned below the Boyue L. Unlike the third generation of Boyue L which is built on CMA platform, the Boyue Cool was built on BMA platform.

The interior features a 10.25-inch digital instrument cluster and a 13.2-inch 2K-resolution infotainment touchscreen powered by a Qualcomm Snapdragon 8155.

The Boyue Cool / New Boyue is powered by the BHE15-EFZ 1.5-litre turbo 4-cylinder engine used in the Geely Binyue, producing 172 hp (128 kW; 174 PS) (179 hp (133 kW; 181 PS) gross output) at 5,500 rpm and 290 N⋅m (214 lb⋅ft) of torque at 2,000–3,500 rpm, and is paired with a 7-speed wet-clutch DCT EVO transmission. It is capable of a claimed 0–100 km/h (62 mph) acceleration time of 7.9 seconds and top speed of 198 km/h (123 mph).

It is exported as the Geely Cityray.

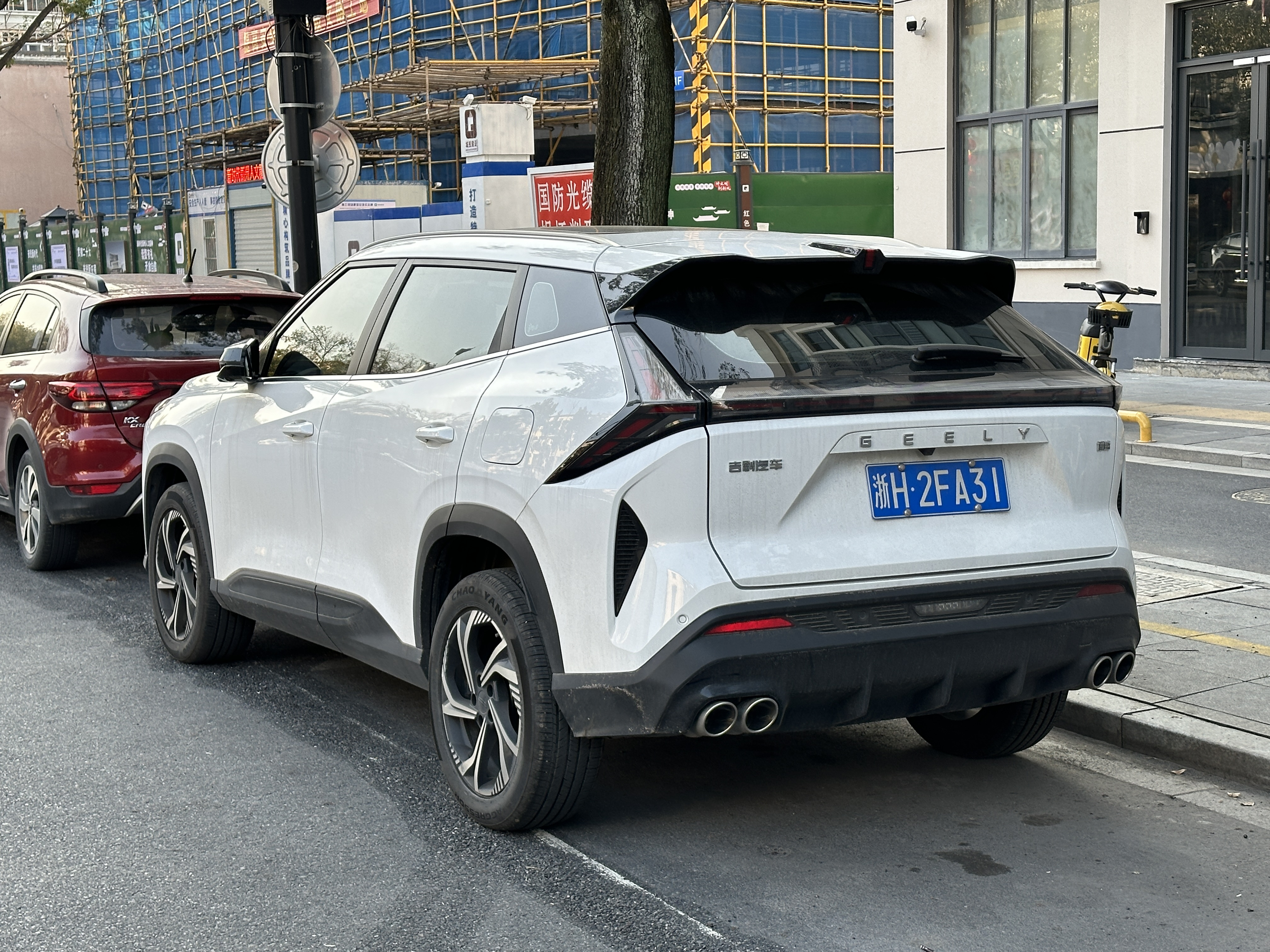
Rear view

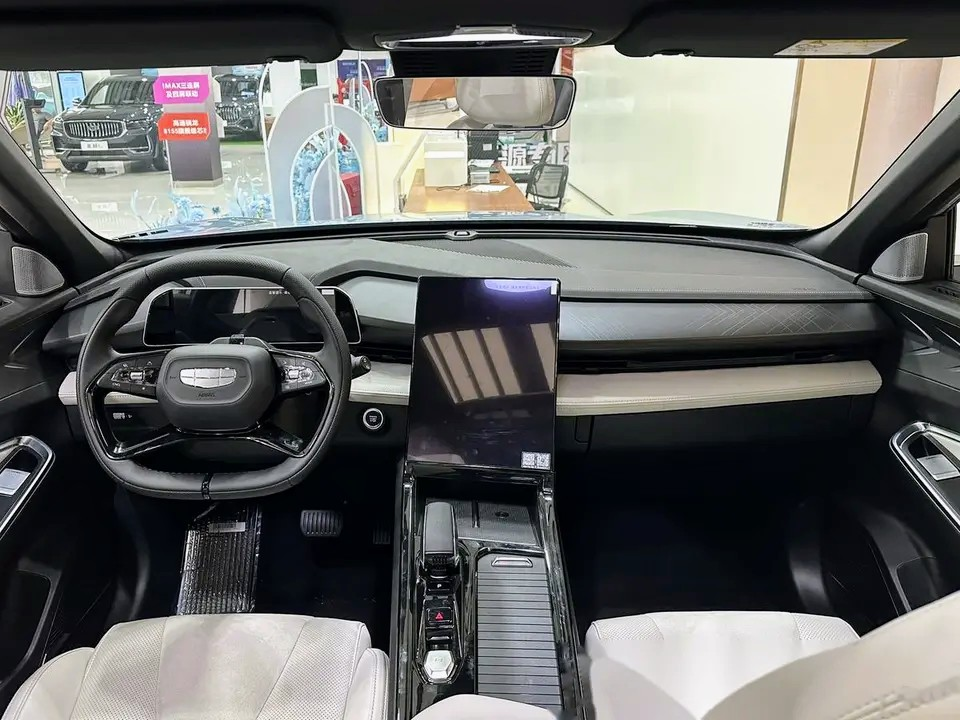
Interior

=== 2025 facelift ===
The G426 Boyue received a facelift in August 2025 featuring a restyled front end with new bumper and headlamps. The interior is updated with a 14.6-inch central infotainment touchscreen.

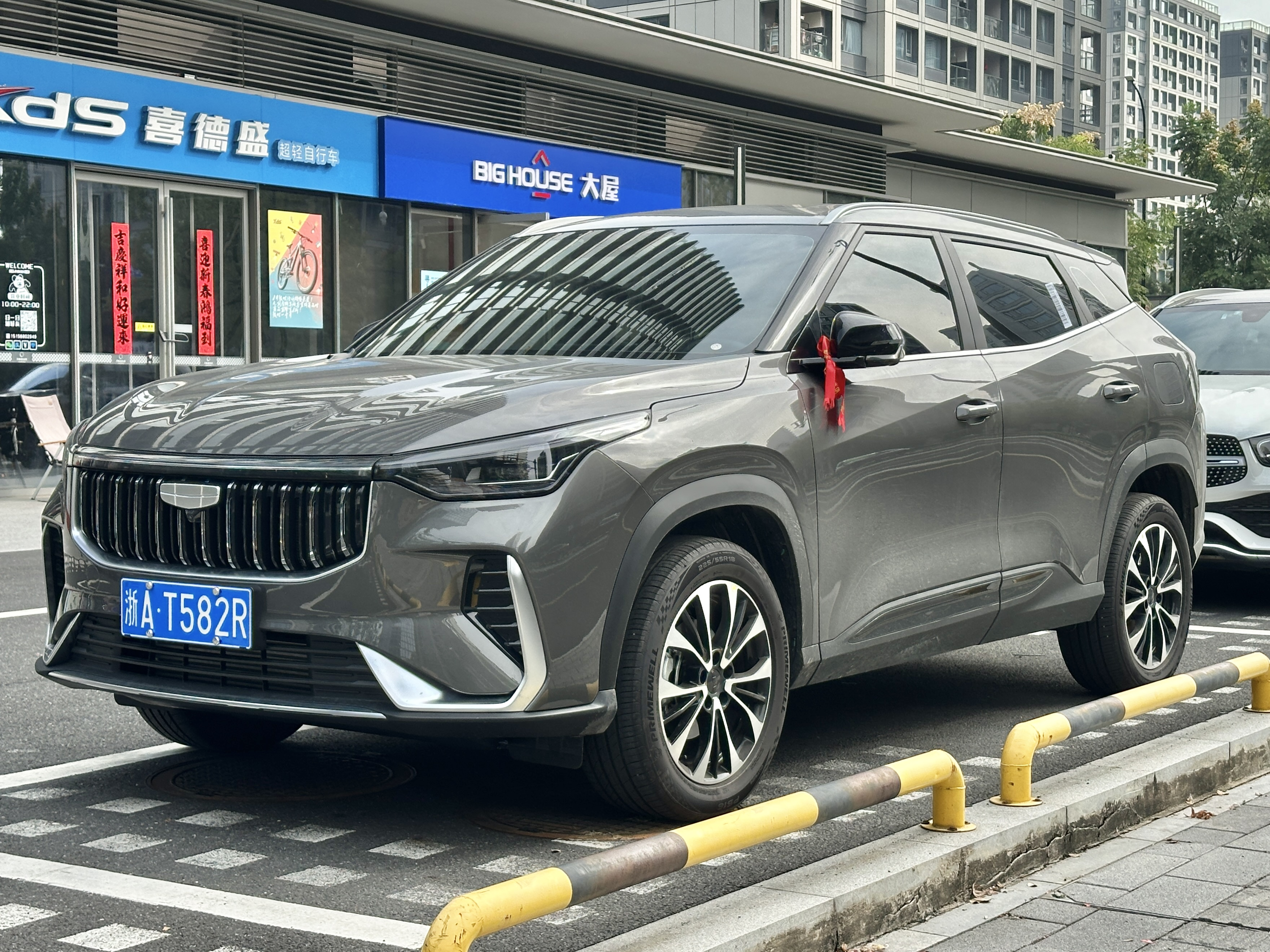
2025 facelift

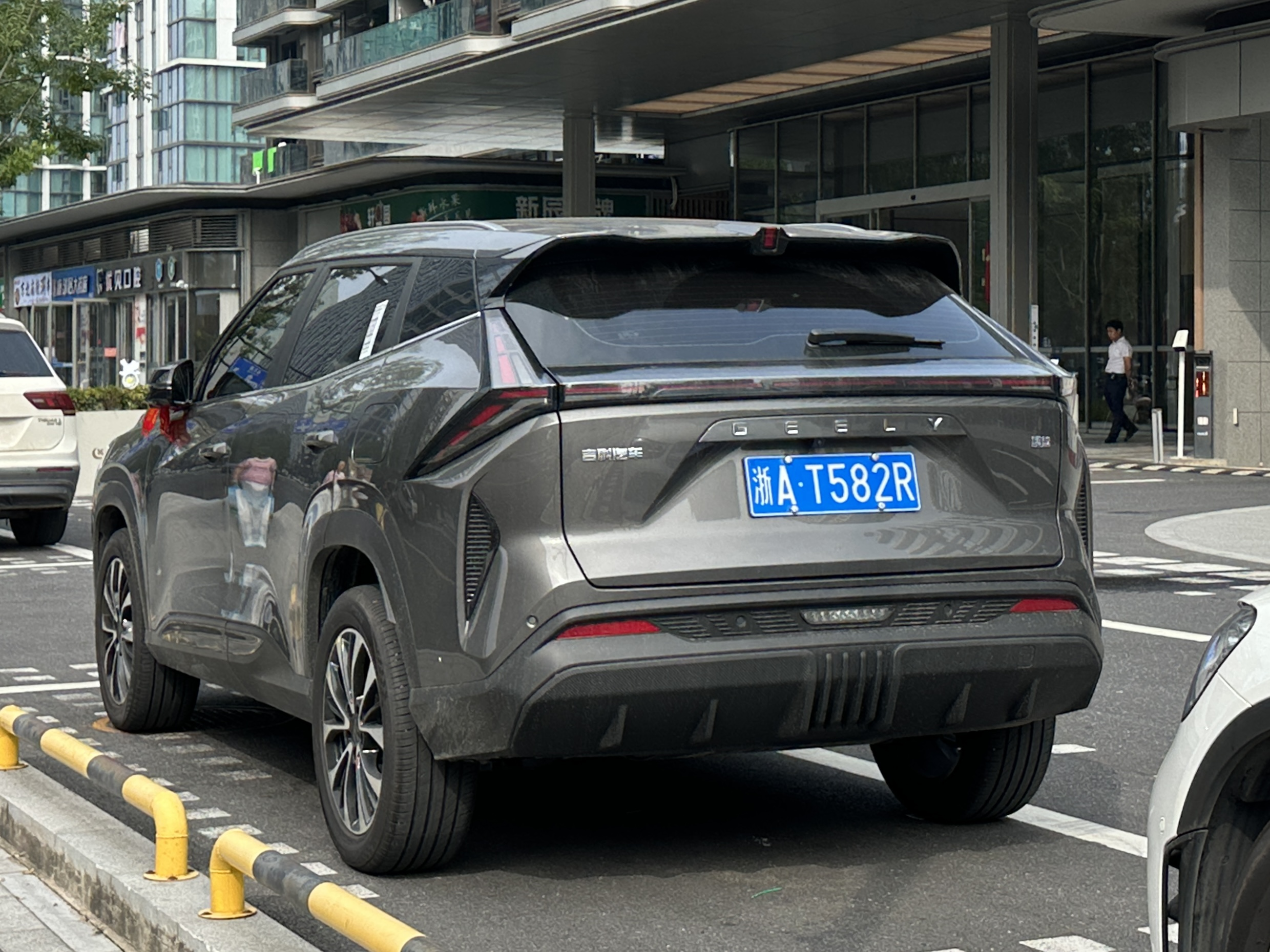
Rear view

=== 2027 facelift ===
The G426 Boyue received another facelift in October 2026 on the base of the previous facelift for the 2027 model year. The front bumper and grilles is restyled again while the rear end is completely redesigned with updated horizontal tail lamps, new tailgate, and restyled rear bumper. The updated interior features a 14.6-inch center console screen running on Flyme Auto 2.5 OS which is now compatible with Huawei HiCar. Geely says the Boyue features a 1500 MPa boron steel doorframe ring, resulting in a torsional rigidity of 27,000 N·m/°.

== Boyue REV (2026) ==
Based on the Livan 7 EREV variant, the Boyue REV was revealed in China on 9 February 2026.

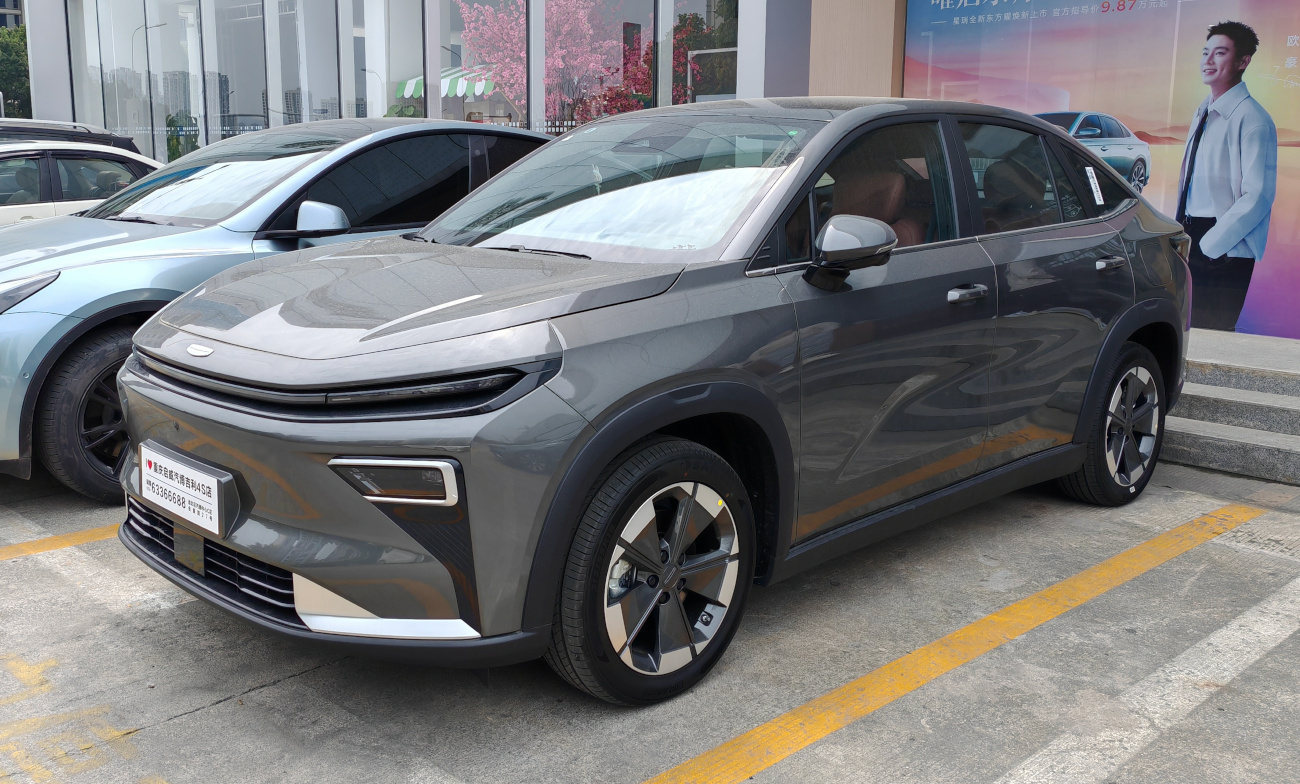
Geely Boyue REV

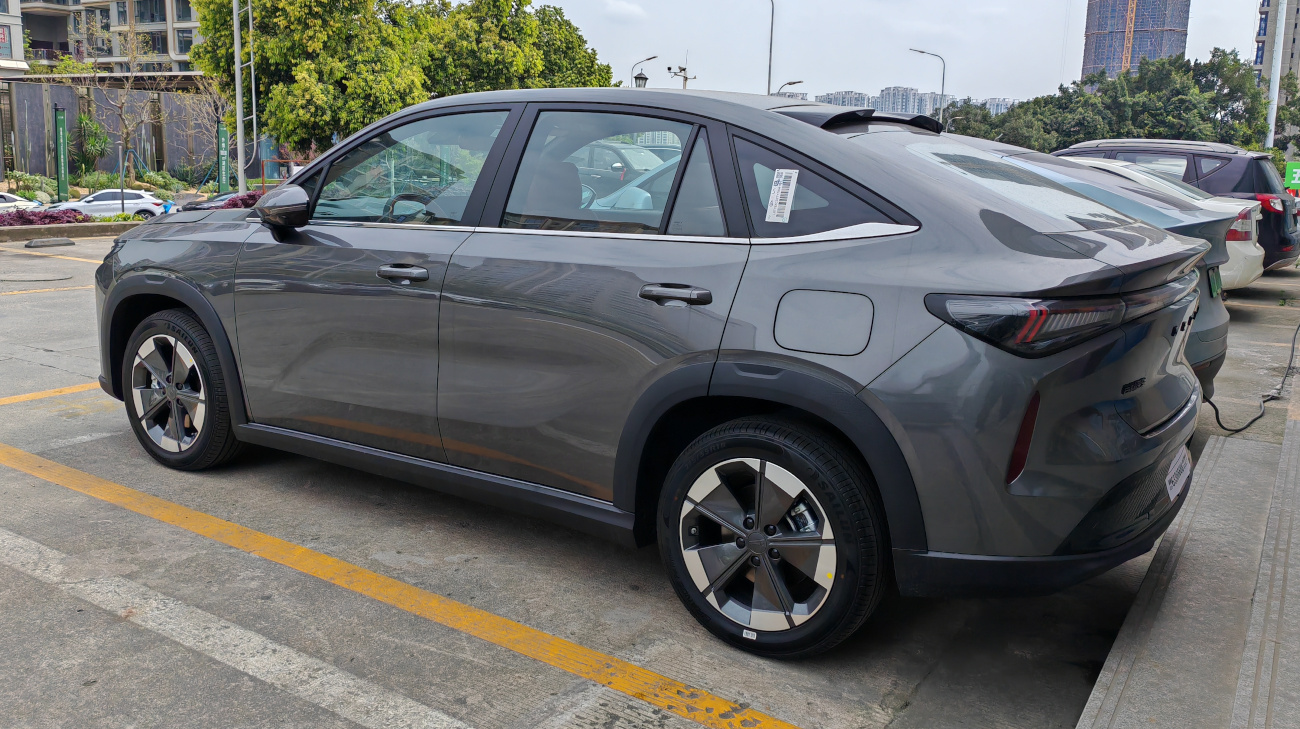
Rear view

== Sales ==
Year	China		Malaysia (X70)	Mexico	
Year	Boyue	Boyue L	Malaysia (X70)	Cityray	Starray
2016	109,209	—	—	—	—
2017	286,163	—	—	—	—
2018	255,695	—		—	—
2019	232,327	—	26,331	—	—
2020	240,811	—	21,944	—	—
2021	224,895	—	16,375	—	—
2022	149,683		18,533	—	—
2023	53,695	112,608	11,200	—	—
2024	59,312	101,806		—	1,556
2025	61,006	148,307		1,813	1,167
