= USS Atlas =

Three ships of the United States Navy have been named Atlas, after Atlas, whose name means bearer or endurer.

- USS Atlas (1869), held that name only briefly before being renamed Nahant on 10 August 1869.
- USS Atlas (SP-2171), was a schooner seized by United States Customs officials at San Francisco from her German owners in 1917.
- USS Atlas (ARL-7), was laid down on 3 June 1943 and launched on 19 October 1943.
