= Atlas (light trucks) =

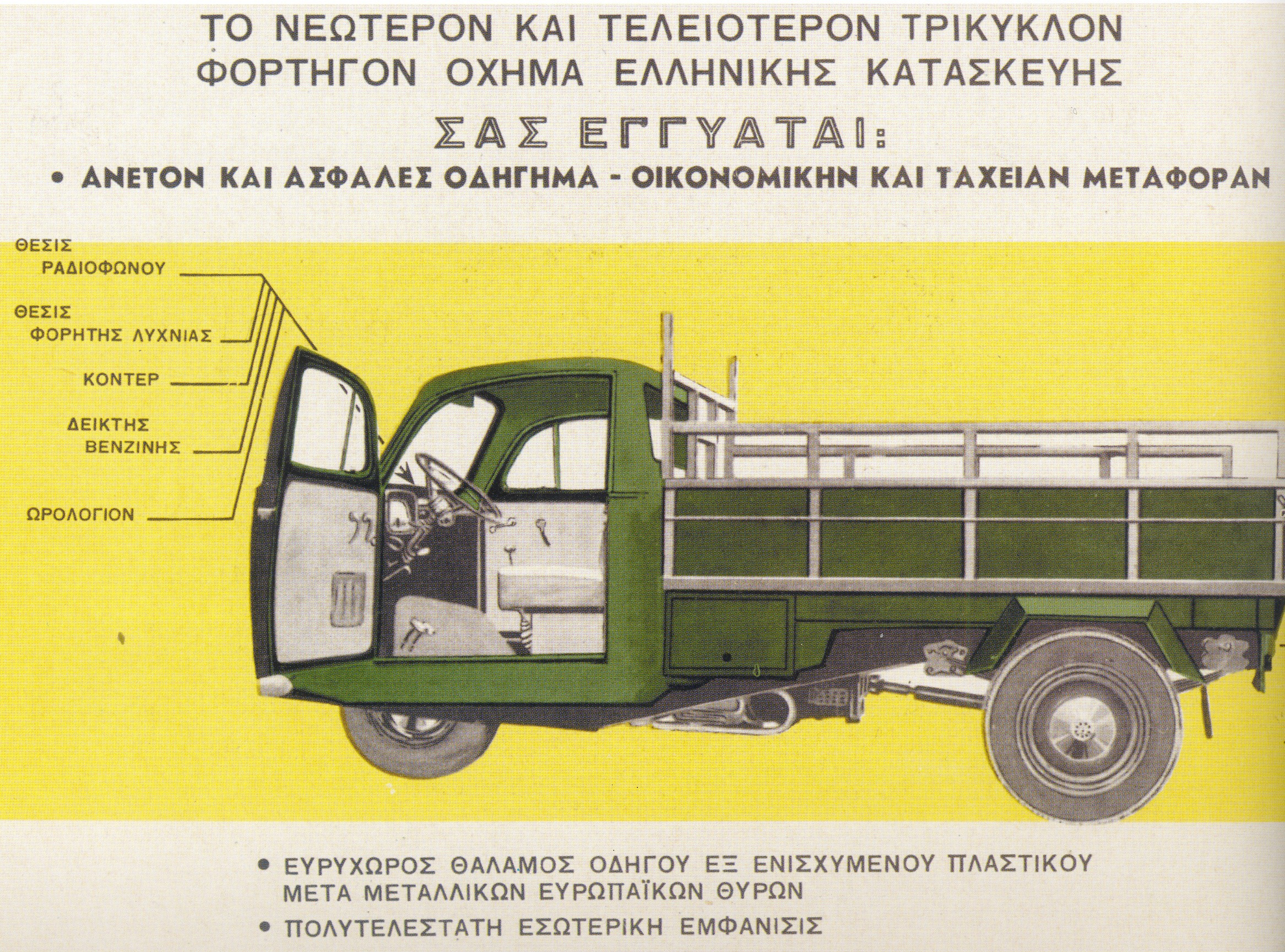
Part of an advertising brochure for the Atlas 1200 P/3. Several details of a typical Greek three-wheel truck can be seen.

Atlas (not to be confused with several other companies who used the same name) was a Greek company based in Rentis that produced three-wheel trucks and other metal structures. In business between 1967 and 1972, it used (often rebuilt) Volkswagen engines, as well as German Ford axles. Cabs were made of glass-fiber reinforced composite. Two different models were produced.
