= Atlas (magazine) =

Atlas is a monthly Turkish magazine. The magazine covers a range of subjects including geography, the environment, history, and culture.

Atlas has been published since April 1993. The magazine is part of Doğan Media Group (Doğan Holding). The publisher is Doğan Burda Rizzoli. The headquarters is in Istanbul.
