= Atlas (ship) =

Atlas may refer to a large number of ships;

- HMS Northumberland (1705), renamed Atlas before sinking in 1781
- Atlas (1801 South Shields ship), a 435-ton merchant ship built in South Shields in 1801, that transported convicts to Port Jackson in 1802 and 1819. She was wrecked outside Pulicat, India on 9 May 1820.
- Atlas (1801 Quebec City ship), a 547-ton merchant ship built in Quebec in 1801, that transported convicts to Port Jackson in 1802.
- Atlas (1811 ship), a 501-ton merchant ship built in Whitby in 1811, that transported convicts to Port Jackson in 1816 and disappeared in 1817.
- Atlas (1812 ship), was launched at Kingston upon Hull as an East Indiaman. She made nine voyages to India or China for the British East India Company (EIC) before she was sold in 1831 for breaking up.
- Atlas, sunk in Hoogly River 1824
- Atlas, wrecked on the Appo Shoal 24 July 1834
- Atlas, whaler wrecked in the Crozet Islands 1837
- Atlas, ran aground on the Burbo Bank, in Liverpool Bay. She was refloated but consequently sank 6 June 1841
- Atlas den Adra, Spanish ship wrecked on Neckman's Ground 14 November 1847
- Atlas, brig driven ashore on Skagen, Denmark 22 Oct 1841
- Atlas, a schooner that was wrecked at Liverpool on December 3, 1863
- Atlas, an English steamship that was wrecked at Damietta, Egypt also on December 3, 1863
- Atlas, British schooner wrecked on Middle Mouse, Anglesey on 9 July 1854
- Atlas, steamship ran aground and wrecked at Gothenburg, Sweden 5 Oct 1975
- Atlas, holed and sunk February 1904
- Atlas, a barge lost after a collision with the screw steamer Katahdin in February 1905
- Atlas (shipentine), a kerosene clipper launched in 1902 and eventually scrapped in 1936
- Atlas, wrecked on Blouberg Beach in Table Bay on October 9, 1896 wrecked on Blouberg Beach in Table Bay on October 9, 1896
- Atlas, cargo ship torpedoed 14 February 1918

== French ==
- French ship Atlas

== See also ==
- HMS Atlas
- USS Atlas
