= List of shipwrecks in November 1837 =

The list of shipwrecks in November 1837 includes ships sunk, foundered, wrecked, grounded, or otherwise lost during November 1837.

== 1 November ==
List of shipwrecks: 1 November 1837
Ship	State	Description
Albion	United Kingdom	The schooner was wrecked and destroyed by fire at Plymouth, Devon. She was on a voyage from "Cape Series" to Newcastle upon Tyne, Northumberland.
Bywell	United Kingdom	The ship was wrecked on the Newcombe Sand, in the North Sea off the coast of Suffolk. All on board were rescued by the Lowestoft Lifeboat. She was on a voyage from London to Newcastle upon Tyne, Northumberland. The wreck was beached at Pakefield, Suffolk on 6 December.
Elizabeth Augusta	Hamburg	The ship was wrecked on the Putgar Reef. She was on a voyage from Hamburg to Stettin.
George Washington	Hamburg	The ship was driven ashore at "Kanso". She was on a voyage from Hamburg to Gothenburg, Sweden. She was later refloated.
Henrica	Sweden	The ship was driven ashore near Kungsbacka. She was on a voyage from Stockholm to Venice, Kingdom of Lombardy–Venetia.
Ingarborg Karitine	Hamburg	The ship was driven ashore between Strandby and "Hjensting", Denmark. She was on a voyage from Hartlepool, County Durham, United Kingdom to Hamburg.
Margaret Ogilvie	United Kingdom	The ship was driven ashore north of Workington, Cumberland. She was on a voyage from Bangor, Caernarfonshire to Belfast, County Antrim.
Providentia	Sweden	The ship was driven ashore at "Kjallo". She was on a voyage from St. Ubes, Portugal to Gothenburg.
Robert	United States	The ship was driven ashore on Vargö, Sweden. She was on a voyage from Gävle, Sweden to New York
Robert Thomas	United Kingdom	The ship was lost off Waterford. Her crew were rescued. She was on a voyage from Quebec City, Lower Canada, British North America to Waterford.
Sisters	United Kingdom	The ship capsized and sank in the English Channel off Swanage, Dorset with the loss of seven crew. She was on a voyage from Newcastle upon Tyne to Exeter, Devon. She was raised on 23 September 1838 and taken into Poole, Dorset.
Trio	Sweden	The ship was driven ashore on Skagen, Denmark. She was refloated in late November and taken into Gothenburg.
Vasco da Gama	Portugal	The galley was wrecked on the Este Till, at the mouth of the Elbe. She was on a voyage from Lisbon to Hamburg.

== 2 November ==
List of shipwrecks: 2 November 1837
Ship	State	Description
Anna	Prussia	The ship was driven ashore at Strömstad, Sweden. She was on a voyage from Amsterdam, North Holland, Netherlands to Königsberg.
Antelope	United States	The ship ran aground off "Cronenburgh", Denmark. She was on a voyage from Saint Petersburg, Russia to New York. She was refloated on 11 November and taken into Copenhagen, where she was condemned.
Clitus	United Kingdom	The ship was driven ashore at Ayr. She was on a voyage from Bathurst, Africa to Ayr.
Leda	United Kingdom	The ship was driven ashore and wrecked at Ambleteuse, Pas-de-Calais, France with the loss of five of her eight crew. She was on a voyage from Cádiz, Spain to London. Her captain had mistaken the Cap Griz Nez Lighthouse, which had been lit for the first time on 1 November, for the Dungeness Lighthouse, Kent.
Packet	United Kingdom	The ship was driven ashore at Helsingør, Denmark. She was on a voyage from Danzig to Kingston upon Hull, Yorkshire.
Times	United Kingdom	The brig was lost in the Black Sea.

== 3 November ==
List of shipwrecks: 3 November 1837
Ship	State	Description
Eliza	United Kingdom	The ship was wrecked on the Petipat Shoal. She was on a voyage from Halifax, Nova Scotia to Miramichi, New Brunswick, British North America.
Mary	Hamburg	The brig departed from Helsingør, Denmark for Aberdeen, United Kingdom. Presumed to have subsequently foundered off Christiania, Norway.
Mercury	United Kingdom	The ship departed from Helsingør for Aberdeen. Presumed to have subsequently foundered off Christiania.
Tredegar	United Kingdom	The ship was driven ashore at Clevedon, Somerset. She was on a voyage from Waterford to Bristol, Gloucestershire.
Trow Tow	United Kingdom	The ship sank in the Bristol Channel off Cardiff, Glamorgan.
Water Witch	United Kingdom	The ship was run into by Surrey (United Kingdom) and sank in the River Thames at Gravesend, Kent whilst engaged in raising Apollo (United Kingdom), which had sunk on 5 September following a collision.

== 4 November ==
List of shipwrecks: 4 November 1837
Ship	State	Description
Agenoria	United Kingdom	The ship was driven ashore on Faial Island, Azores. Her crew were rescued.
Vierge Marie	Belgium	The ship was driven ashore at Rammekins Castle, Vlissingen, Zeeland, Netherlands. She was on a voyage from Marseille, Bouches-du-Rhône to Antwerp, Belgium. Vierge Marie was refloated on 11 November and taken into Vlissingen, Zeeland.

== 5 November ==
List of shipwrecks: 5 November 1837
Ship	State	Description
Five Gebruders	Netherlands	The ship was wrecked near Tönningen, Duchy of Holstein. She was on a voyage from Amsterdam, North Holland to Stettin.
Maria	United Kingdom	The ship was driven ashore near Tönningen. Her crew were rescued. She was on a voyage from England to Altona.
Pensher	United Kingdom	The ship was driven ashore near Tönningen. Her crew were rescued. She was on a voyage from Hamburg to Sunderland, County Durham. Pensherwas later refloated and taken into Tönningen.
Spring	United Kingdom	The ship struck a rock and sank off Jersey, Channel Islands. She was on a voyage from Jersey to London. Spring was refloated on 9 November and taken into Jersey.

== 6 November ==
List of shipwrecks: 6 November 1837
Ship	State	Description
Consecacoa Dentenora	Portugal	The ship was driven ashore and wrecked at Thisted, Denmark. Her crew were rescued. She was on a voyage from Porto to Hamburg.
Thalia	United Kingdom	The ship was driven ashore at Madras, India.

== 7 November ==
List of shipwrecks: 7 November 1837
Ship	State	Description
Elizabeth	United Kingdom	The ship was abandoned in the Atlantic Ocean. Her seven crew were rescued by Everton (United Kingdom). Elizabeth was on a voyage from Bathurst, Africa to Exeter, Devon. She came ashore at Pont-l'Abbé, Finistère, France on 27 November. Elizabeth was refloated on 30 November.
Garnet	United Kingdom	The ship was driven ashore at Kungsbacka, Sweden. She was on a voyage from Hull, Yorkshire to Saint Petersburg, Russia. Garnet had been refloated by 22 November and was subsequently taken into Gothenburg.
Helen Mar	United Kingdom	The ship was driven ashore and severely damaged at Formby, Lancashire. She was on a voyage from Liverpool, Lancashire to New Orleans, Louisiana, United States. Helen Mar was refloated the next day and put back to Liverpool.
Johanna	Hamburg	The ship sprang a leak and sank at Cardiff, Glamorgan, United Kingdom. She was on a voyage from Cardiff to Hamburg. Johanna was later refloated and taken into Cardiff.
Maria Crowther	United Kingdom	The ship was driven ashore and wrecked at Laxey, Isle of Man.
Orontes	United Kingdom	The ship was driven ashore near Liverpool. She was on a voyage from Liverpool to London.

== 8 November ==
List of shipwrecks: 8 November 1837
Ship	State	Description
Anna	Russia	The ship sank at Kongshavn, Norway with the loss of all hands. She was on a voyage from Lisbon, Portugal to Riga.

== 9 November ==
List of shipwrecks: 9 November 1837
Ship	State	Description
Isabella	United Kingdom	The ship was wrecked on the Hauxley Rocks, Northumberland. Her crew were rescued.
Mary	United Kingdom	The ship was sighted off Skagen, Denmark in a capsized state.
Nancy	United Kingdom	The ship was wrecked on Isle Martin, Summer Isles. She was on a voyage from Liverpool, Lancashire to Ullapool, Ross-shire.

== 10 November ==
List of shipwrecks: 10 November 1837
Ship	State	Description
Cordelia	United Kingdom	The ship was driven ashore on Cape Sable Island, Nova Scotia, British North America. All on board were rescued. She was on a voyage from Boston, Massachusetts, United States to Halifax, Nova Scotia.
Fortitude	United Kingdom	The brig was wrecked 5 nautical miles (9.3 km) north of Aveiro, Portugal with the loss of two of her crew. She was on a voyage from Newcastle upon Tyne, Northumberland to Porto, Portugal.
Lord Selkirk	United Kingdom	The ship was driven ashore and wrecked at Richibucto, New Brunswick, British North America. She was on a voyage from Richibucto to Liverpool, Lancashire.
Maria	United Kingdom	The ship was driven ashore near Blyth, Northumberland. She was on a voyage from Seaham, County Durham to London.
Mary and Elizabeth	United Kingdom	The ship was driven ashore at Wells-next-the-Sea, Norfolk. She was later refloated.

== 11 November ==
List of shipwrecks: 11 November 1837
Ship	State	Description
Bartley	United Kingdom	The ship was driven ashore at Larne, County Antrim. She was on a voyage from Saint John, New Brunswick, British North America to Larne.
Echo	United Kingdom	The ship struck rocks and sank at Saint Helier, Jersey, Channel Islands with the loss of two lives. She was on a voyage from Plymouth, Devon to Saint Helier.
Edward	United Kingdom	The ship was wrecked near Wells-next-the-Sea, Norfolk. She was on a voyage from Seaham, County Durham to London.
Factor	United Kingdom	The ship was driven ashore on Green Island. She was on a voyage from Madeira to Quebec City, Lower Canada, British North America.
Luiza	Portugal	The ship struck a sandbank off Fort St. Mark, Maranhão, Brazil and was wrecked. All on board were rescued. She was on a voyage from Lisbon to Maranhão.
Mary Elizabeth	United Kingdom	The ship was driven ashore and severely damaged at Wells-next-the-Sea. She was on a voyage from London to Wells-next-the-Sea.
South Australian	(United Kingdom of Great Britain and Ireland) South Australia	The whaler, a barque, was driven ashore and wrecked in Encounter Bay.

== 12 November ==
List of shipwrecks: 12 November 1837
Ship	State	Description
Tortola	United Kingdom	The ship was driven ashore and wrecked at Blakeney, Norfolk with the loss of two of her crew.
Vrow Helena	Netherlands	The ship was wrecked on Juist, Kingdom of Hanover. She was on a voyage from Rotterdam, South Holland to Bremen.

== 13 November ==
List of shipwrecks: 13 November 1837
Ship	State	Description
Eleanor	United Kingdom	The ship was driven ashore at Helsingør, Denmark. She was on a voyage from Saint Petersburg, Russia to London. Eleanor was later refloated and taken into Copenhagen, Denmark.
Orestes	United Kingdom	The ship was driven ashore at Helsingør. She was on a voyage from Riga, Russia to Chatham, Kent.

== 14 November ==
List of shipwrecks: 14 November 1837
Ship	State	Description
Canton	United Kingdom	The ship was wrecked on the west end of "Brian Island", British North America with the loss of seven of the thirteen people on board. She was on a voyage from Gaspé, Lower Canada, British North America to a British port.
David	United Kingdom	The ship was driven ashore near Katwijk, North Holland, Netherlands. Her crew were rescued. She was on a voyage from "Pelwarn" to Hull, Yorkshire.
Jane	United Kingdom	The ship was driven ashore and wrecked on the Île de Ré, Charente-Maritime, France. Her crew were rescued.
Martha	United Kingdom	The ship was driven ashore and wrecked on the Île de Ré. Her crew were rescued.
Nautilus	United Kingdom	The ship was abandoned in the Mediterranean Sea 40 leagues (120 nautical miles (220 km)) east of Cape Passero, Sicily. Her crew were rescued Bougainville (French Navy). Nautilus was on a voyage from Licata, Sicily to Newcastle upon Tyne, Northumberland.
Thetis	United Kingdom	The ship ran aground on the Whelps and Scarlet Rocks, in the River Shannon. She was on a voyage from Quebec City, Lower Canada, British North America to Limerick.
Vrow Johanna	Netherlands	The ship was driven ashore near Egmond aan Zee, North Holland. She was on a voyage from a port in east Friesland to Antwerp, Belgium.

== 15 November ==
List of shipwrecks: 15 November 1837
Ship	State	Description
Anders	Sweden	The ship was driven ashore at Thisted, Denmark. Her crew were rescued. She was on a voyage from Gothenburg to Guernsey, Channel Islands.
Auguste Julia	Belgium	The ship was holed by her anchor and partly sank in Tor Bay. She was on a voyage from Ostend, West Flanders to Liverpool, Lancashire, United Kingdom. Auguste Julia was subsequently repaired.
Greyhound	United Kingdom	The schooner was wrecked on Prince Edward Island, British North America. Her crew were rescued. She was on a voyage from Quebec City, Lower Canada to Richibucto, New Brunswick.
Jubilee	United Kingdom	The ship struck the wreck of Bywell (United Kingdom) and sank off Lowestoft, Suffolk. Her crew were rescued. She was on a voyage from South Shields, County Durham to Plymouth, Devon.
Junius	United Kingdom	The brig was driven ashore at Blakeney, Norfolk. Her crew were rescued by the Wells Lifeboat.
Sieben Sodskende	Hamburg	The ship was wrecked south of Hårup, Denmark. Her crew were rescued. She was on a voyage from Laurwig, Norway to Hamburg.

== 16 November ==
List of shipwrecks: 16 November 1837
Ship	State	Description
Athena	Belgium	The ship departed from Antwerp for Boston, Massachusetts, United States. No further trace, presumed foundered with the loss of all hands.
Seven Sodskende	Norway	The ship was wrecked south of Hurup, Duchy of Holstein. Her crew were rescued.
William Giles	United Kingdom	The ship was driven ashore on Dragør, Denmark. She was on a voyage from Saint Petersburg to London. She was later refloated and put into Copenhagen.

== 17 November ==
List of shipwrecks: 17 November 1837
Ship	State	Description
Aurora	Belgium	The ship was driven ashore on the Lilleground. She was on a voyage from Riga, Russia to Antwerp. Aurora was later refloated.
Dee	United Kingdom	The barque was driven ashore and damaged on the south coast of Gotland, Sweden. She was on a voyage from Saint Petersburgh, Russia to Hull, Yorkshire. She was later refloated and taken into "Ronhamer".
Genoa Packet	United Kingdom	The ship ran aground at Blyth, Northumberland. She was refloated the next day and taken into Blyth in a leaky condition.
Wilhelm	Bremen	The ship was driven ashore on Terschelling, Friesland, Netherlands. Her crew were rescued. She was on a voyage from Bremen to Tenerife, Canary Islands.

== 18 November ==
List of shipwrecks: 18 November 1837
Ship	State	Description
Antonius	Elbing	The ship was driven ashore at Burnham Overy Staithe, Norfolk, United Kingdom. She was on a voyage from Elbing to Burnham Overy Staithe. She was later refloated.
Athabaska	United Kingdom	The ship was driven ashore at Richibucto, New Brunswick, British North America.
Augusta Signora	Grand Duchy of Tuscany	The ship was driven ashore at Naples, Kingdom of the Two Sicilies. She was on a voyage from "Ismail" to Livorno.
Betsey Black	United Kingdom	The ship was driven ashore at Stromness, Orkney Islands. She was on a voyage from Saint Petersburg, Russia to Lancaster, Lancashire. Betsey Black was refloated on 1 December and taken into Stromness.
Eleanor	United Kingdom	The ship was driven ashore on the Lilleyrund, Denmark. She was on a voyage from Saint Petersburg to London. Eleanor was refloated in late November and taken in to Copenhagen, Denmark.
Indian Chief	United Kingdom	The ship stuck the Rusk Bank, in the Irish Sea and was abandoned by her crew. She was consequently wrecked on the coast of County Wexford. She was on a voyage from Liverpool, Lancashire, to Mauritius.
Lynx	(United Kingdom of Great Britain and Ireland) New South Wales	The barque was wrecked in the New River, New Zealand. Her crew survived. She was on a voyage from the New River to Sydney.
Mary	United Kingdom	The ship was beached in Dublin Bay. She was on a voyage from Liverpool, Lancashire to Calcutta, India. Mary was refloated on 30 November and taken into Dublin.
Palmer	United Kingdom	The ship sprang a leak and was beached near Workington, Cumberland. She was on a voyage from Workington to an Irish port. Palmer was later refloated and taken into Workington.
St. Anna	Grand Duchy of Tuscany	The ship was driven ashore at Naples. She was on a voyage from Taganrog, Russia to Livorno.
William	United Kingdom	The ship was driven ashore at Sunderland, County Durham.

== 19 November ==
List of shipwrecks: 19 November 1837
Ship	State	Description
Ardogowan	United Kingdom	The ship was driven ashore at Ballyferris Point, County Down. She was on a voyage from Whitehaven, Cumberland to Limerick. Ardogowan was later refloated and taken into Drogheda, County Louth.
Blue Eyed Lass	United Kingdom	The ship was wrecked on the Bondicar Rocks, Northumberland. Her crew were rescued.
Camilla	United Kingdom	The ship was driven ashore on the Gaar Sands, at the mouth of the River Tay. She was on a voyage from Newcastle upon Tyne, Northumberland to Dundee, Forfarshire. Camilla was later refloated.
Chance	United Kingdom	The ship ran aground off "Hornbeck". She was on a voyage from Peterhead, Aberdeenshire to Stettin.
Clara	United Kingdom	The ship was driven ashore in St. Georges's Bay, Newfoundland. Her crew were rescued. She was on a voyage from Berbice, British Guiana to Quebec City, Lower Canada, British North America. She was refloated on 2 August 1838 and taken into Quebec City.
Fly	United Kingdom	The ship was driven ashore east of Wells-next-the-Sea, Norfolk.
Lynx	(United Kingdom of Great Britain and Ireland) New South Wales	The whaler, a barque, foundered whilst on a voyage from Sydney to New Zealand. Her crew were rescued.
Union	United Kingdom	The schooner was wrecked on the West Hoyle Bank, in Liverpool Bay with the loss of all hands. She was on a voyage from Londonderry to Liverpool, Lancashire.

== 20 November ==
List of shipwrecks: 20 November 1837
Ship	State	Description
Eagle	United Kingdom	The ship was driven ashore on Læsø, Denmark. She was later refloated.
Gesina Hermina	Netherlands	The ship ran aground on the Goodwin Sands, Kent, United Kingdom. She was on a voyage from Liverpool, Lancashire, United Kingdom to Alkmaar, North Holland. Gesina Hermina was refloated and put in to Texel, North Holland in a leaky condition.
Jordonsjold	Norway	The ship was driven ashore at Dunkirk, Nord, France.
Juno	United Kingdom	The ship ran aground off the Bahamas, where she was destroyed by fire on 24 November. She was on a voyage from Laguna to Liverpool.
Mary Cummings	United Kingdom	The ship was lost off Yell, Shetland Islands.

== 21 November ==
List of shipwrecks: 21 November 1837
Ship	State	Description
Darling	United Kingdom	The ship was driven ashore at Maryport, Cumberland.
Deux Frères	United Kingdom	The ship was driven ashore at Ostend, West Flanders, Belgium. She was on a voyage from Havre de Grâce, Seine-Inférieure to Ostend.
Elizabeth	Heligoland	The ship was driven ashore at Ostend. She was on a voyage from Rüstersiel to Ostend.
Latona	United Kingdom	The ship departed from St. Jago de Cuba, Cuba for Swansea, Glamorgan. No further trace, presumed foundered with the loss of all hands.
Margaret	United Kingdom	The ship was driven ashore at the Point of Carra, Orkney Islands. She was on a voyage from St. Margaret's Hope, Orkney Islands to Leith, Lothian.

== 22 November ==
List of shipwrecks: 22 November 1837
Ship	State	Description
Elizabeth	United Kingdom	The brig was wrecked on the coast of Finistère, France with the loss of all hands.
Excellent	United Kingdom	The ship was driven ashore and wrecked on Læsø, Denmark. Her crew were rescued. She was on a voyage from Saint Petersburg, Russia to London.
Neptune	(United Kingdom of Great Britain and Ireland) British North America	The ship struck a rock off Petit-Rocher, New Brunswick and was wrecked. She was on a voyage from Halifax, Nova Scotia to the Chaleur Bay.
Penasse	Denmark	The ship was wrecked on the coast of Jutland with the loss of several lives. She was on a voyage from London to Copenhagen.
Sophia	United Kingdom	The brig was wrecked off the Port Neuf River, Lower Canada with loss of master and 13 crew; four survivors. She was on a voyage from Montreal, Lower Canada to Greenock, Renfrewshire.
Woodford	United Kingdom	The ship was driven ashore and wrecked on Læsø. Her crew were rescued. She was on a voyage from Riga, Russia to Plymouth, Devon.

== 23 November ==
List of shipwrecks: 23 November 1837
Ship	State	Description
Diana	United Kingdom	The ship was driven ashore at Peterhead, Aberdeenshire. She was on a voyage from Saint Petersburg, Russia to Glasgow, Renfrewshire. Diana was later refloated and taken into Peterhead.
George	United Kingdom	The ship ran aground in the River Colne.
Isabella	United Kingdom	The schooner was driven ashore on the Abertay Sands and sank with the loss of a crew member. She was on a voyage from Rotterdam, South Holland, Netherlands to Perth. Isabella was refloated on 2 December and taken into Perth in a wrecked condition.
Mail	United Kingdom	The brig was driven ashore and wrecked on the Isle of Arran. She was on a voyage from Glasgow to Trinidad.
Reform	United Kingdom	The ship was wrecked on Brier Island, Nova Scotia, British North America. Her crew were rescued. She was on a voyage from Saint Vincent to Digby, Nova Scotia.
Systaire	Sweden	The brig was in collision with a British brig off Bridport, Dorset, United Kingdom and was beached at Burton Bradstock, Dorset. She was on a voyage from Stockholm to Batavia, Netherlands East Indies.

== 24 November ==
List of shipwrecks: 24 November 1837
Ship	State	Description
Albatross	Denmark	The ship was wrecked on Skagen. She was on a voyage from Rio de Janeiro, Brazil to Copenhagen.
Cecilia	United Kingdom	The ship foundered in the North Sea 60 nautical miles (110 km) off Domesnes, Norway. Her crew were rescued. She was on a voyage from Liverpool, Lancashire to Danzig.
Globe	United Kingdom	The ship was wrecked near Alicante, Spain with the loss of all but four of her crew. She was on a voyage from Boston, Lincolnshire to Livorno, Grand Duchy of Tuscany.
Marie	Rostock	The ship was lost off the coast of Nordland, Norway.

== 25 November ==
List of shipwrecks: 25 November 1837
Ship	State	Description
Anne	United Kingdom	The ship was driven ashore at Lytham St. Annes, Lancashire. She was on a voyage from Limerick to Glasson Dock, Lancashire. Anne was later refloated.
Emerald	United Kingdom	The ship was driven ashore in Downing Bay.
Eliza Warwick	United Kingdom	The ship was driven ashore at New Orleans, Louisiana, United States. She was on a voyage from Liverpool, Lancashire to New Orleans. Eliza Warwick was refloated on 9 December.
Hoppet	Sweden	The ship was wrecked on the Swedish coast with the loss of all but one of her crew. She was on a voyage from Havre de Grâce, Seine-Inférieure, France to Strömstad.
Jane	United Kingdom	The ship was driven ashore and wrecked on the Île de Ré, Charente-Maritime, France.
Jane	United Kingdom	The sloop foundered in Dundrum Bay with the loss of two of the five people on board.
Martha	United Kingdom	The ship was driven ashore and wrecked on the Île de Ré.
Neptune	United Kingdom	The ship was driven ashore on Pembrey Sands, Carmarthenshire. She was on a voyage from Bristol, Gloucestershire to Carmarthen.
Niagara	United States	The ship was driven ashore at New Orleans. She was on a voyage from New Orleans to Singapore. Niagara was refloated on 9 December.
Theodore	United States	The ship was wrecked on the Luconia Shoals. Her crew were rescued. She was on a voyage from Singapore to Canton, China.

== 26 November ==
List of shipwrecks: 26 November 1837
Ship	State	Description
Black Boy	United Kingdom	The brig was driven ashore at Winterton-on-Sea, Norfolk. She was later refloated.
Colosseum	United Kingdom	The ship was wrecked on the Kentish Knock with the loss of twelve of the seventeen people on board. She was on a voyage from Saint Petersburg, Russia to St. Ubes, Portugal.
Friends	(United Kingdom of Great Britain and Ireland) Jersey	The ship was last sighted on this date whilst on a voyage from Copenhagen, Denmark to Fortune Bay. No further trace, presumed foundered with the loss of all hands.
Juno	United Kingdom	The ship was driven ashore in the Bahamas. She was on a voyage from British Honduras to London.
Neptune	United Kingdom	The ship was driven ashore at Pembrey, Carmarthenshire. She was on a voyage from Bristol, Gloucestershire to Carmarthen.
Royal Oak	United Kingdom	The ship was driven ashore and wrecked near Blackpool, Lancashire. Her five crew were rescued. She was on a voyage from Liverpool, Lancashire to Carrickfergus, County Antrim.

== 27 November ==
List of shipwrecks: 27 November 1837
Ship	State	Description
Chalco	Mexico	The ship was driven ashore near "Laguna". She was on a voyage from Veracruz to "Laguna". Chalco was later refloated.
Gloucester	United Kingdom	The ship ran aground in the Mississippi River downstream of New Orleans, Louisiana, United States. She was on a voyage from Liverpool, Lancashire to New Orleans.
Harmony	United Kingdom	The ship was driven ashore on Caldy Island, Pembrokeshire. She was later refloated.

== 28 November ==
List of shipwrecks: 28 November 1837
Ship	State	Description
Benjamin	United Kingdom	The ship departed from Liverpool, Lancashire to Newcastle upon Tyne, Northumberland. No further trace, presumed foundered with the loss of all hands.
Colisseum	Portugal	The ship was wrecked on the Goodwin Sands, Kent, United Kingdom with the loss of twelve of the seventeen people on board. She was on a voyage from Saint Petersburg, Russia to St. Ubes.
Conselsan Feliz	Portugal	The ship departed from Faial Island, Azores for Liverpool, Lancashire, United Kingdom. No further trace, presumed foundered with the loss of all hands.
Greenock	United Kingdom	The ship was driven ashore on Inishtrahull, County Donegal, where she was subsequently wrecked. Her crew were rescued. She was on a voyage from Quebec City, Lower Canada to Hull, Yorkshire.
Johanna	Hamburg	The ship ran aground and sank at Cardiff, Glamorgan, United Kingdom. She was on a voyage from Cardiff to Hamburg. Johanna was refloated on 2 December.

== 29 November ==
List of shipwrecks: 29 November 1837
Ship	State	Description
General Coffin	United Kingdom	The ship was wrecked in the Turks Islands. She was on a voyage from Saint John, New Brunswick to Saint Domingo.
Joanna	United Kingdom	The ship was driven ashore near Smyrna, Ottoman Empire. She was on a voyage from London to Malta. Joanna was refloated with assistance from HMS Sapphire (Royal Navy). She arrived as Smyrna on 13 December.
John	United Kingdom	The ship ran aground and sank at Cowes, Isle of Wight. She was on a voyage from London to Newport, Isle of Wight.
Manuel	Spain	The ship was destroyed by fire at Málaga.
Rochdale	United Kingdom	The ship was holed by her anchor and sank at the George Dock, Liverpool, Lancashire.

== 30 November ==
List of shipwrecks: 30 November 1837
Ship	State	Description
Albion	United Kingdom	The ship was driven ashore at Dunbar, Lothian. She was later refloated.
Ann	United Kingdom	The sloop was wrecked on the Polls Bank, in the English Channel off the coast of Sussex. Her crew were rescued by the coastguard.
Foster	United Kingdom	The ship was driven ashore near Hull, Yorkshire. She was on a voyage from Saint Petersburg, Russia to Hull.
James Patterson	United Kingdom	The ship struck the Hutt and Lowth Rock and sank. Her crew were rescued. She was on a voyage from Troon, Ayrshire to Dublin.
Margaret	United Kingdom	The ship was in collision with a fishing boat and sank in the Irish Sea off The Skerries. She was on a voyage from Dundalk, County Louth to Bristol, Gloucestershire.
Mercur	Denmark	The brig was driven ashore at Dover, Kent, United Kingdom. She was on a voyage from Memel to Bordeaux, Gironde, France. Mercur was refloated and taken into Dover.
Mercury	United Kingdom	The ship was driven ashore at Dover. She was on a voyage from Memel to Dover. Mercury was later refloated and taken into Dover.
Oak	United Kingdom	The ship was holed by her anchor and sank at King's Lynn, Norfolk.
Pilot	United Kingdom	The ship was driven ashore at Burnham Overy Staithe, Norfolk.

== Unknown date ==
List of shipwrecks: Unknown date in November 1837
Ship	State	Description
Active	France	The ship was driven ashore and wrecked on Utsira, Norway before 7 November. Her crew were rescued. She was on a voyage from Le Croisic, Loire-Inférieure to Molde, Norway.
Anecdote	United Kingdom	The ship foundered off County Galway.
Anne	United Kingdom	The schooner was lost whilst on a voyage from Prince Edward Island to Miramichi, New Brunswick, British North America. Her crew were rescued.
Belle Isle	United Kingdom	The ship was damaged by ice and driven ashore in the Saint Lawrence River downstream of Madras Island before 19 November.
Briton	United Kingdom	The brig ran aground on the Manicougan Shoal and was damaged.
Campo Bello	United Kingdom	The ship was driven ashore and wrecked at Richibucto, New Brunswick, British North America before 1 December.
Canton	United Kingdom	The ship was wrecked on Brier Island, Nova Scotia, British North America before 14 November.
Frances	United Kingdom	The ship was driven ashore and damaged at Margate, Kent. She was on a voyage from London to Sligo. Frances was later refloated and taken into Whitstable, Kent.
Fame	United Kingdom	The schooner was lost whilst on a voyage from Prince Edwar Island to Miramichi. Her crew were rescued.
Gledstone	United Kingdom	The whaler was wrecked on Hawaii, Sandwich Islands before 18 November. She had been deliberately set afire by the cook, who subsequently committed suicide.
Gode Hensigt	Norway	The ship was abandoned in the Norwegian Sea. She was taken into Stavanger on 17 November.
James Colvin	United Kingdom	The whaler was set afire by the ship's cook, who subsequently committed suicide. Her crew were rescued by Catawbu (United States). James Colvin was driven ashore and wrecked on Hawaii before 18 November.
Jane	United Kingdom	The ship was driven ashore on Cape Breton Island, Nova Scotia. She was on a voyage from Barbados to Prince Edward Island. Jane was refloated in June 1837 and completed her voyage on 30 June.
Johanna	Netherlands	The ship was lost on the coast of Norway before 11 November.
Jonge Catharina	Netherlands	The ship was driven ashore near Tönningen, Duchy of Holstein and severely damaged. She was on a voyage from Stralsund to Zaandam, North Holland. Jonge Catharina was later refloated and taken in to Tönningen.
Juno	United Kingdom	The ship was driven ashore in the Bahamas on or before 26 November.
Liverpool	(United Kingdom of Great Britain and Ireland) British North America	The ship was abandoned in the Atlantic Ocean before 5 November.
Margaretha	Duchy of Holstein	The ship was lost on the Vogel Sand, in the North Sea. Her crew were rescued by Caroline ( Duchy of Holstein). Margaretha was on a voyage from Glückstadt to Hull, Yorkshire, United Kingdom.
Maria	Netherlands	The ship was driven ashore at Frederikshavn, Denmark before 23 November. She was on a voyage from Amsterdam, North Holland to Stralsund and/or Rostock.
Mercury	United Kingdom	The ship capsized off Skagen, Denmark on or before 9 November. She was on a voyage from Danzig to Aberdeen.
Trio	United Kingdom	The brig was driven ashore in the Dardanelles before 13 November. She was refloated with assistance from HMS Carysfort (Royal Navy).
Watson	United Kingdom	The ship was driven ashore on the coast of Denmark. She was on a voyage from Saint Petersburg, Russia to Hull, Yorkshire. Watson was later refloated and taken into Copenhagen.
