= French ship Atlas =

Several ships of the French Navy have borne the name Atlas:

- Atlas (1738), a 50-gun ship, wrecked in 1739.
- Atlas (1766), the refitted prize known as Northumberland until 1766, sunk off Ushant in 1781
- Atlas (1801), a 74-gun ship, formerly the Spanish Atlante of 1754 transferred to France in 1801, was captured in 1808 and taken into service resuming her original name of Atlante by the Spanish Navy. Broken up in 1817.
- Ville de Berlin (1807), a 74-gun ship, was renamed Atlas at the end of the Empire. She became a hulk in 1819.

== Also see ==
- Atlas (ship)
