= James Dempsey (builder) =

- Born: 1768/9; Ireland
- Died: 12 February 1838; Sydney, Australia
- Occupation: Builder
- Years active: 1814 - 1838
- Known for: Organising the first Roman Catholic community in Australia

James Dempsey, transported from Ireland following the 1798 rebellion, was the founder of the first Roman Catholic community in Australia and was a major contributor to the building of the first Catholic cathedral in Australia.

== In Ireland ==
The life of James Dempsey fell into two almost equal parts. The last 36 of his 69 years were based in New South Wales as a respected builder and a dedicated member of the Catholic community, while his first 33 years, much less well documented, had been spent in Ireland.

Dempsey hailed from County Wexford, on the south-east corner of the island. His Australian gravemarker claimed that he was 69 years of age when he died on 10 February 1838, so he is likely to have been born in 1768 or very early in 1769. The only other information currently available about his years in Ireland comes from the record of his criminal trial in Wicklow in 1799.

Dempsey had been among those who had risen with United Irishmen against the British Crown and the Protestant Ascendancy in the early summer of 1798. He had taken part in the Battle of Vinegar Hill and had suffered a severe shoulder wound at Hacketstown. In 1799 he stood trial on three counts: the murder of two loyalists, killed after Vinegar Hill; the murder of two soldiers in the British army at Ballyellis; and rebellion in general. After an outstandingly scrupulous hearing at Wicklow (north of Wexford), Dempsey was found not guilty of both murder charges but was sentenced to transportation for life as a rebel.

Dempsey sailed for Australia on the transport ship ‘Atlas’, which left Cork in southern Ireland on 6 July 1802 and reached Sydney in October. He was not accompanied by any of his family.

== Rehabilitation and prosperity in Sydney, 1814 to 1825 ==
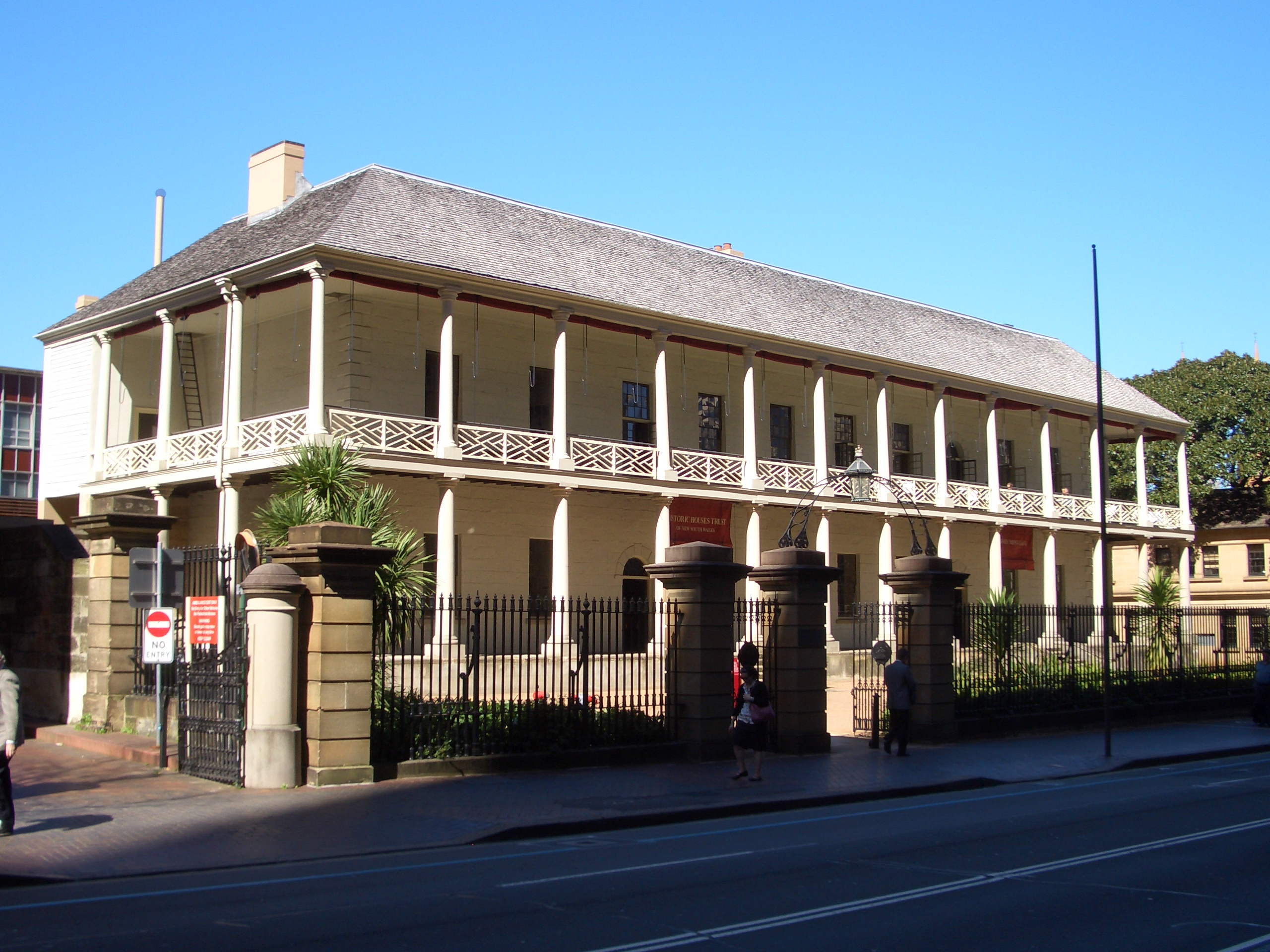
A surviving portion of the Rum Hospital Sydney Mint.

The muster of 1806 shows him working, still a prisoner, at Dawes Point Battery in Sydney.

Since by 1810, perhaps as early as 1806, Dempsey was overseer of the government stonemasons and claimed to have given satisfaction to ‘the Governor, his Engineers And Officers in Command’, it can be assumed that he had brought building skills to the colony from Ireland. He worked on the stone bridge over the Tank Stream in 1811 and was in charge of the builders erecting the Rum Hospital (surviving portions now used as Parliament House and the Sydney Mint) from 1812 until 1815.

Governor Macquarie confirmed the pardon which Colonel Foveaux had conferred on Dempsey during the interregnum in 1809, and from 1814 onwards Dempsey became a private builder and speculator in real estate.

There are contemporary glimpses of Dempsey's circle of acquaintances in Sydney. He acted as executor for a number of Irishmen.

He diversified his entrepreneurial activities from time to time. He was dealing in imported rum in 1816, tendering for the government contract for salt pork at Windsor in 1823 and retailing Catholic books in 1824. He continued to practise his own skills in carving stone and in 1815 was paid the large sum of £29 for preparing the inscription for the new Military Barracks near his home.

== Dempsey, the Catholic community and St Mary’s Cathedral ==
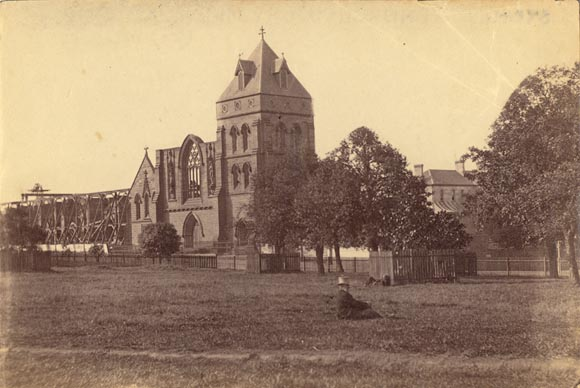
The former St Mary's Cathedral, Sydney, ca. 1870 (built 1843, destroyed by fire 1865) showing surviving belltower built to designs by A W N Pugin. St Mary's Cathedral.

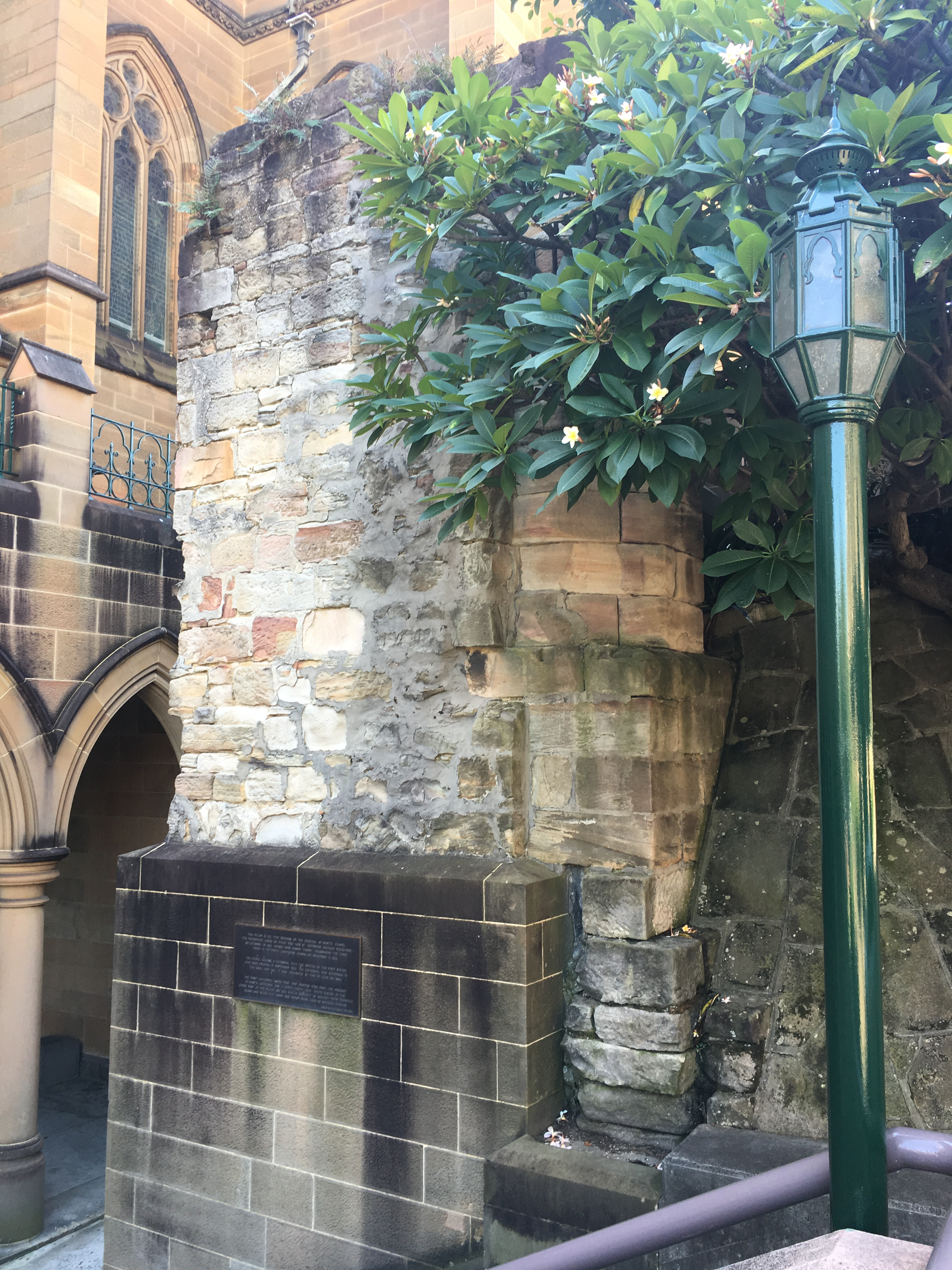
Stone pillar in the grounds of St Mary's Cathedral in Sydney. The only surviving portion of the First St Mary's Cathedral, Sydney. Photographed 2016.

James Dempsey was a prominent and devout member of the Catholic community in Sydney. Before Father Jeremiah Francis O'Flynn arrived in the colony in 1817, a group of Catholic men and women met regularly at Dempsey's house in Kent Street to recite the rosary and to sing Vespers. Paul Chandler believes ‘that Dempsey had some confraternity members residing with him in Kent Street; if so, this must have been Australia’s first Christian community.’

The brief appearance in Sydney of an unauthorised Catholic priest, Father O’Flynn, for just over six months in 1817-1818 led to a consecrated host being left behind when O’Flynn was deported. It has become a heated issue whether this host was protected by James Dempsey or by another prominent Catholic William Davis, who donated the site of St Patrick's Church near his home on Church Hill. The much later letters and speeches of three Fitzpatrick brothers who had been around Dempsey's house as children in Macquarie's time give powerful testimony, claiming that before Father Therry arrived in 1820 the host was kept inside the Kent Street house, in a private room watched over reverently by a group of Catholic men. It is in fact likely that the host was consumed in 1819 by a visiting French priest. (15)

After 1820 Dempsey worked closely with Father Therry on the construction of a suitable chapel for Catholic worship. The site of what became St Mary's Cathedral near Hyde Park Barracks had been chosen by James Meehan, the deputy surveyor-general who had also been transported from Ireland for his support to the 1798 rebellion.

Dempsey was a prominent member of the committee raising funds for the chapel. Therry was not a good businessman and when there was no money to pay the labourers in 1823 Dempsey paid the men out of his own pocket for a while. Dr Waldersee, a leading authority on Father Therry, concluded that without Dempsey, the first St Mary's would not have been completed.

In an unsuccessful attempt to raise funds, Dempsey travelled to Calcutta in India in October 1825 and did not return until the following May. The expenses incurred on the trip exceeded the meagre donations raised in India.

Eventually, Dempsey returned to Sydney, sailing from Liverpool in 1831. He had the satisfaction of seeing the completion of St. Mary's and attending the first mass there on Christmas Day 1833. He remained on the committee raising funds for the interior decoration and furnishing of the church and saw the arrival of Bishop Polding in 1835.

But he was now in his mid-60s. He gave up his Kent Street house and moved to a small plot in Clarence Street which he was granted in October 1836. In failing health, he made his will on 5 January 1838.

Dempsey's funeral service was held at St Mary's and he was buried in the Devonshire Street cemetery on 12 February. The funeral notice described him as ‘for many years a Builder in this Town’. The gravemarker was removed to Botany Cemetery when Devonshire Street was closed to allow for the construction of Central railway station in 1901 and its text was transcribed before it was destroyed in the 1980s.

== Bibliography ==
- Chandler, Paul (2002). James Dempsey and John Butler: Lay Pioneers of Australian Catholicism. Middle Park Vic: Carmelite Communications. ISBN 1876717238.
- Dempsey, Dennis. "Where first I took two small steps; The Dempsey Story, 1802-2002" Goanna Print, Canberra, 2002 ISBN 0646419439.
- Flannery, Tim, 1999, "The Birth of Sydney", Grove Press, New York.
- Hyland, Patricia. "A Dempsey family story: Sydney Cove to Narooma: mill whistles, blucher boots & bugattis" Sydney: Seamist Press, 1990 ISBN 0731689380
- Kee, Robert, 1980, "Ireland a History", Wenfield and Nicholson Ltd, London.
- Kerridge, Veronica, 1991, "High Country Heritage", self-published, Sydney.
- Northwood, Ted, and Speer, "Albert Charker Otherwise Chalker -His History"
- Waldersee, James; O'Farrell, Patrick; "Duffy, Monsignor C J and others", 1971, St Mary's Cathedral Sydney 1821–1971, Devonshire Press, Sydney.
- Walker, Veronica, 1971, "The James Dempsey Story",.self- published, Sydney.
- Whitaker, Anne-Maree. "Unfinished Revolution: United Irishmen in NSW 1800-1810" ISBN 0 646 17951 9 Published in 1994 by Crossing Press
- related page- St. James' Forest Lodge,1877-1977, a parish chronicle, by John Fletcher.
- related page- Correspondence received relating to the Dempsey story.
- related page- 2004 Reflections on Kent Street, by Dennis Dempsey.
