= Atlas (1811 ship) =

UK merchant ship and convict transport 1811–1817

History

United Kingdom
- Name: Atlas
- Owner: T. Barrick
- Builder: T. Barrick, Whitby
- Launched: 1811, or 1812
- Fate: Disappeared, believed to have foundered in 1817

General characteristics
- Tons burthen: 501, or 502(bm)
- Length: 115 ft 6 in (35.2 m) (keel)
- Beam: 32 ft 2 in (9.8 m)
- Propulsion: Sail
- Armament: 1812:10 × 18-pounder guns "of the New Construction"; 1816:10 × 18-pounder carronades

Atlas was a 501-ton sailing ship that was built at Whitby and launched in 1811. In 1814 she successfully defended herself in a single-ship action with an American privateer. In 1816 she transported convicts to New South Wales, and afterwards disappeared off the coast of India in 1817.

== Career ==
Atlas entered Lloyd's Register in 1812 with W. Parker, master, changing to Fairclough, T. Barrick, owner, and trade London transport.

On 9 January 1813 Atlas was at Lisbon when she lost an anchor in a gale. A number of other transports were either lost or seriously damaged in the same gale. The number of transports involved suggests that they were their in connection with the Peninsular War.

The transport Atlas, Fairclough, master, arrived at Cork on 19 August 1814. She had on 17 August repelled an attack by the American privateer York, of 14 guns and 150 men. Atlas had only 10 guns and 27 men and boys on board, including three passengers.

Convict voyage (1816): Under the command of Walter Meriton, she sailed from Portsmouth, England on 23 January 1816, and arrived at Port Jackson on 22 July. She embarked 194 male convicts, seven of whom died on the voyage. (Note: The numbers in Bateson clearly exhibit some typographical errors. He has Atlas embarking 294 convicts, and landing 187, with only one convict having died on the voyage.) A detachment of 34 men of the 89th Regiment of Foot provided the guard.

Atlas left Port Jackson on 12 September bound for Batavia.

== Loss ==
On 29 July 1817, Atlas dropped the pilot at Sandheads, at the mouth of the River Ganges, as she sailed from Calcutta to London. (Note: Hackman confuses the fate of this Atlas with that of a different Atlas.) She was not heard from again. (Note: Lloyd's List gives the master's name as Moncur, but all other sources give it as Meriton.)

Lloyd's Register continued to carry Atlas, with Meriton, master, and trade London—Botany Bay, to the 1821 volume. The Register of Shipping carried the same information to the 1822 volume.
