= List of shipwrecks in 1824 =

The list of shipwrecks in 1824 includes some ships sunk, wrecked or otherwise lost during 1824.

table of contents
1824
Jan	Feb	Mar	Apr
May	Jun	Jul	Aug
Sep	Oct	Nov	Dec
Unknown date

== Unknown date ==
List of shipwrecks: Unknown date in 1824
Ship	State	Description
Aimwell	United Kingdom	The whaler was lost in the Davis Strait. Her crew were rescued.
Albion	United Kingdom	The ship was wrecked on St. Catherine's Island, south of Savannah, Georgia, United States, before 9 November. She was on a voyage from British Honduras to London.
Angelica	flag unknown	The ship was wrecked on Buck Island, Virgin Islands.
Atlas	United Kingdom	The ship sank in the Hooghly River. She was on a voyage from London to Calcutta, India.
Chace	United States	The ship was wrecked in the Abaco Islands before 9 July. Her crew were rescued. She was on a voyage from Charleston, South Carolina, to Havana, Cuba.
Columbian	United Kingdom	The ship was lost in the Straits of Gaspar. Her crew survived.
Deux Eugenies	France	The ship was wrecked at Newburn, North Carolina, United States. Her crew were rescued. She was on a voyage from Newburn to Guadeloupe.
Disinganno	Russia	The ship was lost in the Mediterranean Sea near Corfu, She was on a voyage from Smyrna to Trieste.
Dorset	United Kingdom	The ship was wrecked on the Barnard Sand, in the North Sea off the coast of Suffolk.
Edward	United States	The East Indiaman suffered an explosion in her magazine, was set afire and sank in the South Atlantic off the coast of Africa. All on board survived. She was on a voyage from Pondicherry, India, to Boston, Massachusetts.
Esperanza	United Kingdom	The ship was lost at Maracaibo, Gran Colombia.
Fanny	United Kingdom	The ship was driven ashore on the coast of Brazil. She was later refloated and taken in to Maranhão, where she was declared unworthy of repair.
Fortune	Bremen	The ship was driven ashore in the Mississippi River. She was on a voyage from New Orleans, Louisiana, United States, to Bremen.
France	France	The ship was wrecked at Guadeloupe. She was on a voyage from Guadeloupe to Savannah, Georgia, United States, and Havre de Grâce, Seine-Inférieure.
Franklin	United States	The schooner was wrecked in the Caicos Islands before 31 July.
George	United Kingdom	The ship was lost at "Rio Grande".
Georgiana	United Kingdom	The ship was lost at the Cape of Good Hope.
Hercules	United Kingdom	The brig was wrecked on Fox Island, Lower Canada, British North America.
Jane	United Kingdom	The brig was wrecked on the Isla de Sacrificios. She was on a voyage from Alvarado, Veracruz, Mexico, to Havana, Cuba.
Janus	United Kingdom	The ship departed from Tönning, Kingdom of Hanover, for Hull, Yorkshire, in September or October. No further trace, presumed foundered in the North Sea with the loss of all hands.
King David	United Kingdom	The ship capsized at Prince Edward Island, British North America and was a total loss.
Mary	(United Kingdom of Great Britain and Ireland) British North America	The sealer was lost in ice off the coast of Newfoundland. Her crew were rescued.
Petit Louis	France	The ship was wrecked at Guadeloupe. Her crew were rescued. She was on a voyage from Bordeaux, Gironde t Guadeloupe.
Pilgrim	United Kingdom	The ship was captured by pirates. Her crew were murdered and the vessel was destroyed.
Sir John Cameron	United Kingdom	The ship departed from Chaleur Bay in late October or early November. No further trace, presumed foundered with the loss of all hands.
Sophie Antonio	France	The ship was lost at St. Domingo.
Spring	United Kingdom	The ship was wrecked at Wabasso, Florida, United States.
Utka (Утка, 'Duck')	Imperial Russian Navy	The transport ship ran aground near the Dniester Estuary and was later wrecked at the Danube Delta.
Voyageur	France	The ship was lost whilst on a voyage from Île Bourbon to Mauritius. Her crew were rescued.
