= List of shipwrecks in November 1847 =

List of shipwrecks in November 1847 includes ships sunk, foundered, wrecked, grounded, or otherwise lost during November 1847.

== 1 November ==
List of shipwrecks: 1 November 1847
| Ship | State | Description |
|---|---|---|
| Fanny | France | The ship was driven ashore at Gibraltar. She was on a voyage from Gijón to Málaga, Spain. Fanny was refloated on 3 November. |
| Harmonie | Prussia | The brig was driven ashore at Ventava, Courland Governorate. Her crew were rescued. She was on a voyage from Stettin to Ventava. |

== 2 November ==
List of shipwrecks: 2 November 1847
| Ship | State | Description |
|---|---|---|
| Emily | (United Kingdom of Great Britain and Ireland) South Australia | The ship ran aground on a reef off Trou-aux-Biches, Mauritius. She was on a voyage from Adelaide to Mauritius. She was refloated and taken in to Mauritius. |
| Regent | United Kingdom | The schooner ran aground on the Long Sand, in the North Sea off the coast of Essex. She was on a voyage from East Wemyss, Fife to the Charente. She was refloated and taken in to Harwich, Essex for repairs. |
| Unique | United Kingdom | The ship was wrecked off Plymouth, Devon. She was on a voyage from Alexandria, Egypt to Gloucester. |

== 3 November ==
List of shipwrecks: 3 November 1847
| Ship | State | Description |
|---|---|---|
| Betsey | United Kingdom | The sloop was driven ashore and wrecked at Breakness, Orkney Islands. Her crew were rescued. She was on a voyage from Wick, Caithness to Liverpool, Lancashire. |
| Gee | United Kingdom | The ship ran aground on the Anholt Reef. She was on a voyage from Hull, Yorkshire to Ventava, Courland Governorate. She was refloated and resumed her voyage. |
| Medora | United Kingdom | The brigantine ran aground on the Red Buoy Shoal, off Halifax, Nova Scotia, British North America. |
| Poseidon | Grand Duchy of Mecklenburg-Schwerin | The brig was wrecked at Syra, Greece. |
| Rose | United Kingdom | The schooner was driven ashore and wrecked near Cape Caraborneau, Ottoman Empire. Her crew survived. |

== 4 November ==
List of shipwrecks: 4 November 1847
| Ship | State | Description |
|---|---|---|
| Achilles | United Kingdom | The ship was damaged by fire and beached at Memel, Prussia. |
| Ann | United Kingdom | The ship departed from Hartlepool, County Durham for the Charente. No further trace, presumed foundered with the loss of all hands. |
| Britannia | United Kingdom | The ship was sighted on this date whilst on a voyage from Hartlepool to Manila, Spanish East Indies. No further trace, presumed foundered with the loss of all hands. |
| Pelado | Brazil | The brigantine was driven ashore at Buenos Aires, Argentina. |
| Venus | United Kingdom | The ship departed from Limerick for the Bristol Channel. No further trace, presumed foundered with the loss of all hands. |

== 5 November ==
List of shipwrecks: 5 November 1847
| Ship | State | Description |
|---|---|---|
| Frankea | Kingdom of Hanover | The ship was driven ashore at "Bredfjed", Denmark. She was on a voyage from Antwerp, Belgium to Rostock. She was refloated the next day and resumed her voyage. |
| Heinrich | Stralsund | The ship sank of "Ancona". Her crew were rescued. She was on a voyage from Rügenwalde, Prussia to King's Lynn, Norfolk, United Kingdom. |
| Jane and Susan | United Kingdom | The schooner was severely damaged by fire at Saint John's, Newfoundland, British North America. |
| Jem Bunt | United Kingdom | The ship was driven ashore at New Abbey, Dumfriesshire. She was on a voyage from Lincolnshire to Newport Pratt, County Mayo. She was refloated the next day but drove ashore and sank. Her crew were rescued. |

== 6 November ==
List of shipwrecks: 6 November 1847
| Ship | State | Description |
|---|---|---|
| Amazon | United Kingdom | The ship was driven ashore at Boulmer, Northumberland. She was refloated. |
| Anna Maria | Netherlands | The ship departed from Amsterdam, North Holland for Marseille, Bouches-du-Rhône, France. No further trace, presumed foundered with the loss of all hands. |

== 7 November ==
List of shipwrecks: 7 November 1847
| Ship | State | Description |
|---|---|---|
| Brothers | United Kingdom | The sloop sprang a leak and sank off Dunbar, Lothian. Her crew survived. She was on a voyage from Berwick upon Tweed, Northumberland to Port Dundas, Renfrewshire. |
| Conch | (United Kingdom of Great Britain and Ireland) Cape Colony | The schooner was wrecked at the mouth of the Umzimvubu River. Her crew were rescued. |
| Eliza Liddle | United Kingdom | The ship was driven ashore and wrecked at Mothecombe, Devon. |
| Jeune Dauphin | France | The ship was wrecked near "Altrach", Finistère. She was on a voyage from Rouen, Seine-Inférieure to Bordeaux, Gironde. |
| Constitution | Haiti | The sloop of war exploded at approximately 2pm. A report published in the New York Tribune on Dec 6, 1847 suggested approximately twenty killed. |

== 8 November ==
List of shipwrecks: 8 November 1847
| Ship | State | Description |
|---|---|---|
| Albion | United Kingdom | The ship was driven ashore in Broadhaven Bay. |
| Amistad | Spain | The barque was driven ashore and damaged at Manila, Spanish East Indies. She was later refloated. |
| Ann and Jane | United Kingdom | The ship was wrecked on Labuan Island, Malaya with the loss of two lives. She was on a voyage from London to Hong Kong. |
| Aristide Marie | France | The full-rigged ship was driven ashore at Manila. She was later refloated. |
| Calpe | United Kingdom | The ship was driven ashore and damaged at Kilrush, County Clare. She was on a voyage from Kilrush to London. |
| Camelia | France | The brig was wrecked near Ballinskelligs, County Cork, United Kingdom with the loss of all but one of her crew. |
| HMRC Chance | Board of Customs | The cutter was driven out to sea from Peel, Isle of Man. No further trace, presumed foundered with the loss of all hands. |
| Crescent | United Kingdom | The ship was driven ashore at Sligo. She was later refloated and taken in to Sligo. |
| Daddon | United Kingdom | The brigantine foundered in the Bristol Channel 10 nautical miles (19 km) west of Milford Haven, Pembrokeshire with the loss of all but two of her five crew. Survivors were rescued by the full-rigged ship Fanny (United Kingdom). Daddon was on a voyage from Faro, Portugal to London. |
| Dewdrop | United Kingdom | The ship capsized and was driven ashore at Sligo. She was later righted and taken in to Sligo. |
| Eliza | United Kingdom | The ship was driven ashore in Westport Bay. She was on a voyage from Ballyshannon, County Donegal to Youghal, County Cork. |
| Erin | United Kingdom | The ship was driven ashore and wrecked at Spray Point, Prince Edward Island, British North America. She was on a voyage from Trois-Rivières, Province of Canada, British North America to London. |
| Estanislae | Spain | The ship was lost off Ferrol. All on board were rescued. She was on a voyage from Gijón to Havana, Cuba. |
| Lady Margaret | United Kingdom | The brig was driven ashore and damaged at Manila. She was later refloated. |
| Meteora | Spain | The schooner was driven ashore at Manila. She was later refloated. |
| Nicolai I | Russia | The ship was driven ashore and wrecked near Karlskrona, Sweden. She was on a voyage from Gamla Carleby, Grand Duchy of Finland to an English port. |

== 9 November ==
List of shipwrecks: 9 November 1847
| Ship | State | Description |
|---|---|---|
| Ana | Spain | The ship was abandoned in the Atlantic Ocean. Her crew were rescued by Helen Hamilton (United Kingdom) and she was set afire. Ana was on a voyage from Cádiz to New York, United States. |
| Dispatch | United Kingdom | The ship was driven ashore and wrecked on Canna, Inner Hebrides. Her crew were rescued. She was on a voyage from the Isle of Skye to the Clyde. |
| Erin | United Kingdom | The ship was driven ashore at Little Pond, Prince Edward Island, British North America. She was on a voyage from Georgetown, Prince Edward Island to London. |
| Lord Dalmeny | United Kingdom | The brig capsized in the Bay of Biscay. Her crew were rescued by Avenir (France). Lord Dalmeny was on a voyage from Newcastle upon Tyne, Northumberland to Porto, Portugal. |
| Mary Eleanor | United Kingdom | The ship was driven ashore at Westport, County Mayo. |
| Sampson | United Kingdom | The ship was driven ashore west of Tramore, County Waterford and abandoned by her crew. She was refloated and towed in to Waterford by the steamship Duncannon. |
| William | United Kingdom | The ship was driven ashore on the coast of County Durham. She was on a voyage from London to Leith, Lothian. She was refloated and put in to Hartlepool, County Durham in a leaky condition. |

== 10 November ==
List of shipwrecks: 10 November 1847
| Ship | State | Description |
|---|---|---|
| Eleanor | France | The ship ran aground on the Cross Sand, in the North Sea off the coast of Norfolk, United Kingdom. She was on a voyage from Newcastle upon Tyne, Northumberland, United Kingdom to Algiers, Algeria. She was refloated and taken in to Great Yarmouth, Norfolk |
| Elizabeth | United Kingdom | The ship was driven ashore near King's Lynn, Norfolk. She was on a voyage from Hartlepool, County Durham to King's Lynn. |
| Fire Fly | United Kingdom | The paddle steamer ran aground at Ardrossan, Ayrshire. She was on a voyage from Belfast, County Antrim to Ardrossan. She was refloated, but a crew member was killed when he was struck by a capstan during the refloating operation. |
| Helena and Jacoba | Netherlands | The ship was driven ashore at "Trefadog", Wales. She was on a voyage from Liverpool, Lancashire, United Kingdom to Dordrecht, South Holland. |
| Hero | United Kingdom | The ship struck rocks off the South Lighthouse, County Antrim and sank. Her crew survived. She was on a voyage from Belfast, County Antrim to Newport, Monmouthshire. |
| Industry | United Kingdom | The sloop was wrecked at St. Abbs Head, Berwickshire. Her crew were rescued. She was on a voyage from Borrowstoness, Lothian to Newcastle upon Tyne, Northumberland. |
| John and Mary | United Kingdom | The ship ran aground and was damaged at Whitby, Yorkshire. |
| Louise Emelie | United Kingdom | The schooner ran aground on the East Barrow Sand, in the North Sea off the coast of Essex, United Kingdom. She was on a voyage from Sunderland, County Durham to Bordeaux, Gironde. Louise Emelie was refloated with assistance from the smacks Atalanta and Lord Howe (both United Kingdom and taken in to Harwich, Essex. |
| Margaret | United Kingdom | The ship was driven ashore near Worthington, Dumfriesshire. |
| Nautilus | United Kingdom | The ship was wrecked on the coast of Labrador, British North America. |
| Oriental | United Kingdom | The ship was wrecked at Cape Passero, Sicily with the loss of a cew member. She was on a voyage from Smyrna, Ottoman Empire to Liverpool. |
| Ostsee | Kolberg | The ship ran aground off Skagen, Denmark and was abandoned by all bar her captain. She was on a voyage from London, United Kingdom to Danzig. She floated off the next day and drifted out to sea. |
| Prince Albert | United Kingdom | The ship ran aground in the River Tyne at Stanhope, County Durham. She was on a voyage from the River Tyne to Cartagena, Spain. She was refloated. |
| Stephen Whitney | United States | The ship was wrecked on West Calf Island, County Cork with the loss of 92 of the 110 people on board. She was on a voyage from New York, United States to Liverpool, Lancashire. |
| Venus | United Kingdom | The schooner was driven ashore near Worthington. |

== 11 November ==
List of shipwrecks: 11 November 1847
| Ship | State | Description |
|---|---|---|
| Ballina Lass | United Kingdom | The schooner was in collision with Arethusa (United Kingdom) and sank off Ailsa Craig. Her crew were rescued. |
| Dorothy | United Kingdom | The barque was driven ashore and wrecked at Dumessness, North Ronaldsay, Orkney Islands. Her crew were rescued. She was on a voyage from Newcastle upon Tyne, Northumberland to Hong Kong. |
| Lady Kennaway | United Kingdom | The East Indiaman, a barque, was abandoned in the Atlantic Ocean 200 nautical miles (370 km) west of the Isles of Scilly. All on board were rescued by La Meuse ( (Belgium) Belgian Navy) and a Guernsey vessel. Lady Kennaway was on a voyage from Bombay, India to London. She was discovered on 19 November by the brig Industrie and barque Naiaden (both Denmark) which attempted to take her in tow. The tow was abandoned on 22 November and Industrie made for Falmouth, Cornwall, United Kingdom. Lady Kennaway was towed in to Falmouth on 2 December by HMS Confiance (Royal Navy). |
| Maria | Danzig | The sloop was driven ashore near Büsum, Duchy of Schleswig with the loss of a crew member. She was on a voyage from Amsterdam, North Holland, Netherlands to Danzig. She was refloated. |
| Sapphire | United Kingdom | The ship was driven ashore on the east coast of Öland, Sweden. She was on a voyage from Saint Petersburg, Russia to the Clyde. She was refloated on 15 November and resumed her voyage. |
| Swan | (United Kingdom of Great Britain and Ireland) Jersey | The ship was wrecked on Buck Point, Cornwall. Her crew were rescued. She was on a voyage from Jersey to the Clyde. |
| Vanskappen | Sweden | The ship was driven ashore near Vaasa, Grand Duchy of Finland. Her crew were rescued. |

== 12 November ==
List of shipwrecks: 12 November 1847
| Ship | State | Description |
|---|---|---|
| Alert | United Kingdom | The schooner was in collision with the brig Devon (United Kingdom) and was abandoned in the North Sea off Yorkshire. Her crew were rescued by a boat from Devon, which was subsequently retrieved by Tamerlane (United Kingdom). Alert was on a voyage from Newcastle upon Tyne, Northumberland to London. |
| Augusta | United Kingdom | The ship ran aground on the Scarp, off the coast of County Durham. She was refloated. |
| Bee | (United Kingdom of Great Britain and Ireland) Antigua | The droghing sloop was driven ashore and wrecked on Slippery Rock, Antigua. |
| Francis | United Kingdom | The schooner was driven ashore and sank at Hartlepool, County Durham. |
| Northumbria | United Kingdom | The ship was driven ashore at East Newton, Yorkshire. Her crew were rescued. She was on a voyage from an American port to Newcastle upon Tyne, Northumberland. |

== 13 November ==
List of shipwrecks: 13 November 1847
| Ship | State | Description |
|---|---|---|
| Economy | United Kingdom | The ship was run aground on the Long Sand, in the North Sea off the coast of Essex. She was on a voyage from Hull, Yorkshire to Harwich, Essex. She was refloated and taken in to King's Lynn, Norfolk in a severely damaged condition. |
| Elise | (Denmark) Duchy of Schleswig | The ship sank in the Cattegat with the loss of all but her captain. She was on a voyage from Stettin to Hull. |
| Perkins | United Kingdom | The brig was wrecked on the Lemon Sand, in the North Sea off the coast of Norfolk. Her crew took to the boats; they were rescued by a French Brid. Perkins was on a voyage from Newcastle upon Tyne, Northumberland to London. |
| Skjold | Denmark | The barque was driven ashore and severely damaged at Manila, Spanish East Indies. |
| Volontaire | France | The ship was driven ashore and wrecked east of Calais. She was on a voyage from Newcastle upon Tyne, Northumberland, United Kingdom to Marseille, Bouches-du-Rhône. |

== 14 November ==
List of shipwrecks: 14 November 1847
| Ship | State | Description |
|---|---|---|
| Ann | United States | The schooner ran aground on the Whistle Rock, near Porthdinllaen, Caernarfonshire, United Kingdom. She later capsized, but was subsequently taken in to Pwllheli, Caernarfonshire in a severely damaged condition. |
| Atlas den Adra | Spain | The ship was wrecked on Neckman's Ground, in the Baltic Sea off the coast of Denmark. Her crew were rescued. She was on a voyage from Cádiz to Vyborg Sweden. |
| Champion | United Kingdom | The brig ran aground on the Seesand, in the North Sea. She was on a voyage from Newport, Monmouthshire to Hamburg. She was refloated and taken in to Amrum, Duchy of Schleswig in a leaky condition. |
| Colonna | United Kingdom | The ship was wrecked on the Caico Bank, in the River Plate. Her crew were rescued. She was on a voyage from Valparaíso, Chile to Buenos Aires, Argentina and Liverpool, Lancashire. |
| Lucretia | United States | The barque was wrecked near Cape George, Nova Scotia, British North America. She was on a voyage from Providence, Rhode Island to Pictou, Nova Scotia. |
| Rapid | United Kingdom | The ship ran aground off Skagen, Denmark. Her crew were rescued. She was on a voyage from Liverpool, Lancashire to Saint Petersburg, Russia. |
| Wanskappen | Prussia | The brig ran aground on the Goodwin Sands, Kent, United Kingdom. She was on a voyage from Newcastle upon Tyne, Northumberland, United Kingdom to Lisbon, Portugal. She was refloated with the assistance of boats from Deal and Ramsgate and taken in to The Downs, then Ramsgate. |

== 15 November ==
List of shipwrecks: 15 November 1847
| Ship | State | Description |
|---|---|---|
| Amalia | Prussia | The ship was driven ashore and wrecked on Bornholm, Denmark. Her crew were rescued. She was on a voyage from Memel to Grimsby, Lincolnshire, United Kingdom. |
| Anne and Sarah | United Kingdom | The ship ran aground and sank at Port Talbot, Glamorgan. Shew as on a voyage from Port Talbot to Bristol, Gloucestershire. She was refloated on 19 November and taken in to Port Talbot in a severely damaged condition. |
| Britannia | United Kingdom | The schooner was driven ashore at Gloucester, Massachusetts, United States. She was refloated. |
| Brothers | United Kingdom | The sloop was driven ashore near Thurso, Caithness. She was on a voyage from Macduff, Aberdeenshire to Stornoway, Isle of Lewis, Outer Hebrides. She was refloated on 4 December. |
| I Don't Know | (United Kingdom of Great Britain and Ireland) South Australia | The schooner was driven ashore near Port Phillip. |
| John | United Kingdom | The ship was wrecked on the Culver Sand, in the Bristol Channel. Her crew were rescued. She was on a voyage from Waterford to Bristol, Gloucestershire. |
| Maggy Lauder | United Kingdom | The smack was driven ashore and wrecked at East Hope, Orkney Islands. Her crew were rescued. She was on a voyage from Wick, Caithness to Longhope, Orkney Islands. |
| Neptune | Bremen | The ship was driven ashore near Baltimore, Maryland, United States. She was on a voyage from Bremen to Laguna, Texas, United States. |
| Ocean Queen | United Kingdom | The ship was driven ashore at Buenos Aires, Argentina. |
| Saville | Kingdom of the Two Sicilies | The ship was driven ashore at Terranova di Sicilia. She was on a voyage from Naples to Licata. She was later refloated and taken in to Malta, where she arrived on 31 December. |

== 16 November ==
List of shipwrecks: 16 November 1847
| Ship | State | Description |
|---|---|---|
| Earl Grey | United Kingdom | The ship was wrecked on the Hever. Her crew were rescued. she was on a voyage from the Clyde to Hamburg. |
| Harwich | United Kingdom | The sloop departed from Warkworth, Northumberland for Aberdeen. No further trace, presumed foundered with the loss of all hands. |
| Henry | United Kingdom | The barque was wrecked on the Tusker Rock, in the Bristol Channel with the loss of one of her nineteen crew. Survivors were rescued by William and Jane (United Kingdom). Henry was on a voyage from Liverpool, Lancashire to Cardiff, Glamorgan. Part of the wreck came ashore at the Mumbles, Glamorgan on 21 November and part at Minehead, Somerset on 24 November. |
| Louis Philippe | France | The ship was wrecked on the Nantucket Shoals, in the Atlantic Ocean off the coast of Massachusetts, United States. All on board, more than 175 people, were rescued by the steamships Massachusetts and Telegraph (both United States). Louis Philippe was on a voyage from Havre de Grâce, Seine-Inférieure to New York. |
| Pearl of Nairn | United Kingdom | The schooner was driven ashore and wrecked near Banff, Aberdeenshire with the loss of one of her eleven crew and one of six rescuers. She was on a voyage from Sunderland, County Durham to Campbelltown of Ardersier, Inverness-shire. |
| St. Niel | Russia | The ship was driven ashore at Ossinoca Cape. She was on a voyage from Saint Petersburg to Rouen, Seine-Inférieure, France. |
| Tweedside | United Kingdom | The ship ran aground and was wrecked between Benbecula and South Uist, Outer Hebrides. She was on a voyage from Hartlepool, County Durham to Malta. |

== 17 November ==
List of shipwrecks: 17 November 1847
| Ship | State | Description |
|---|---|---|
| Anna Elizabeth | Sweden | The ship was wrecked off Storjungfrun. Her crew were rescued. |
| Flora | Sweden | The ship capsized in the Mediterranean Sea and was driven ashore on Mallorca. Four of her crew were rescued. |
| Freundschaft | Prussia | The ship foundered in the English Channel off Cap Gris Nez, Pas-de-Calais, France. She was on a voyage from Memel to Nantes, Loire-Inférieure, France. |
| Harvest Home | United Kingdom | The ship was wrecked at Sydney, Nova Scotia, British North America. Her crew were rescued. She was on a voyage from Newcastle upon Tyne, Northumberland to Sydney. |
| Hope | United Kingdom | The schooner foundered at Margate, Kent. Her crew were rescued by the luggers Hero and Rugby (both United Kingdom). Hope was on a voyage from Hull, Yorkshire to Margate. |
| Ingeborg | Norway | The ship was driven ashore near Harboøre, Denmark. Her crew were rescued. She was on a voyage from Lillesand to Waarde, Zeeland, Netherlands. |
| James | United Kingdom | The ship was wrecked on the Banjaard Sand, in the North Sea off the coast of Zeeland, Netherlands. Her crew were rescued. She was on a voyage from Charlestown, Cornwall to Rotterdam, South Holland, Netherlands. |
| Le Protégé de Marie | France | The sloop collided with another vessel and foundered in the English Channel off Dungeness, Kent. Her four crew were rescued. She was on a voyage from Blyth, Northumberland, United Kingdom to Rouen, Seine-Inférieure. |
| Margaret | United Kingdom | The ship was driven ashore and wrecked at the West Quoddy Head Lighthouse, Maine, United States. She was on a voyage from London to Saint John, New Brunswick, British North America. |
| Pet | United Kingdom | The ship was sighted off Cape San Antonio, Spain whilst on a voyage from Constantinople, Ottoman Empire to Cork. No further trace, presumed foundered with the loss of all hands. |
| Regent | United Kingdom | The abandoned ship sank in the North Sea off Great Yarmouth, Norfolk. |
| Richard | United Kingdom | The sloop was beached at Sea Palling, Norfolk. She was refloated on 11 January 1848 and taken in to Great Yarmouth. |
| Vigilant | United Kingdom | The schooner sprang a leak and was wrecked on the Herd Sand, in the North Sea off the coast of County Durham. Her crew were rescued by the North Shields Lifeboat. She was on a voyage from Sunderland, County Durham to Portsoy, Aberdeenshire. |

== 18 November ==
List of shipwrecks: 18 November 1847
| Ship | State | Description |
|---|---|---|
| Anns | United Kingdom | The schooner was abandoned in the North Sea off Great Yarmouth, Norfolk. Her crew were rescued by a brig. She was on a voyage from Newcastle upon Tyne, Northumberland to London. |
| Helme | United Kingdom | The ship was driven ashore at King's Lynn, Norfolk. She was on a voyage from Hartlepool, County Durham to King's Lynn. |
| Hermann Louis | Bremen | The ship ran aground on the Robben Platte, in the North Sea. |
| Samuel Smith | United Kingdom | The ship was wrecked on Rodrigues, Mauritius. All on board were rescued. She was on a voyage from Penang, Malaya to London. |
| Sarepta | United Kingdom | The ship was driven ashore near King's Lynn. She was on a voyage from Hartlepool to King's Lynn. |
| Smaland | Sweden | The ship was driven ashore on the south coast of Formentera, Spain. She was on a voyage from Stockholm to Marseille, Bouches-du-Rhône, France. |
| Universe | United Kingdom | The ship was abandoned in the Atlantic Ocean. Her crew were rescued by Athens and Merchant (both United States). Universe was on a voyage from London to Saint Andrews, New Brunswick. |

== 19 November ==
List of shipwrecks: 19 November 1847
| Ship | State | Description |
|---|---|---|
| Catherina Maria | Netherlands | The ship was driven ashore on Ameland, Friesland. Her crew were rescued. She was on a voyage from Rostock to Amsterdam, North Holland. |
| Concord | United Kingdom | The ship capsized and sank at Portsmouth, Hampshire. She was righted and refloated. |
| Fortuna | Argentina | The ship was wrecked on the Camarones Bank. |
| Lawson | United Kingdom | The ship was driven ashore near Trapani, Sicily. She was on a voyage from Taganrog, Russia to Cork or Falmouth, Cornwall. She was refloated and taken in to Trapani. |
| Narcissa | United States of the Ionian Islands | The brig was wrecked on the coast of Calabria, Kingdom of the Two Sicilies with the loss of five of her crew. She was on a voyage from Berdiansk, Russia to Marseille, Bouches-du-Rhône, France. |
| Pentadelfo | Greece | The ship capsized at Cork, United Kingdom. |
| Planet | (United Kingdom of Great Britain and Ireland) British North America | The ship was driven ashore at Sand Point, Nova Scotia. She was on a voyage from Montreal, Province of Canada to Halifax, Nova Scotia. |
| Saville | Kingdom of the Two Sicilies | The ship was driven ashore near Terranova di Sicilia, Sicily. Her crew were rescued. She was on a voyage from Naples to Licata, Sicily. She was refloated in late December and taken in to Malta, where she arrived on 31 December. |
| Veronica | (United Kingdom of Great Britain and Ireland) British North America | The ship was wrecked on Rossiter Point. She was on a voyage from Colville Bay to Trois-Rivières, Province of Canada. |
| 15 de Maio | Spain | The barque sank off Gibraltar. She was refloated and taken in to Ceuta. |

== 20 November ==
List of shipwrecks: 20 November 1847
| Ship | State | Description |
|---|---|---|
| Asie | France | The ship ran aground off Dunkirk, Nord. She was on a voyage from Dunkirk to Martinique. |
| Brothers | United Kingdom | The sloop sprang a leak and foundered off Cove Bay, Aberdeenshire. Her crew survived. She was on a voyage from Berwick upon Tweed, Northumberland to Port Dundas, Renfrewshire. |
| Enterprise | United States | The ship was driven ashore at Sambro, Nova Scotia, British North America. She was on a voyage from New York to Halifax, Nova Scotia. She became a wreck the next day. |
| Favourite | Bremen | The ship ran aground on the Shipwash Sand, in the North Sea off the coast of Essex, United Kingdom. She was on a voyage from London to Bremen. She was refloated and resumed her voyage in a leaky condition. |
| Utility | United Kingdom | The ship was driven ashore north of Drogheda, County Louth. Her crew were rescued. She was on a voyage from Whitehaven, Cumberland to Dublin. She was refloated on 24 November and taken in to Drogheda. |

== 21 November ==
List of shipwrecks: 21 November 1847
| Ship | State | Description |
|---|---|---|
| Atlas | United Kingdom | The full-rigged ship foundered in the Atlantic Ocean 150 nautical miles (280 km) south west of the Isles of Scilly with the loss of all but four of her crew. Survivors were rescued by the barque Baronet (United Kingdom). Atlas was on a voyage from Cardiff, Glamorgan to Bombay, India. |
| Castries | United Kingdom | The barque was driven ashore at Beaumaris, Anglesey. |
| Catharina | Danzig | The ship was abandoned in the Norwegian Sea. Her crew were rescued. She was on a voyage from Danzig to Newcastle upon Tyne, Northumberland, United Kingdom. |
| Dandy | United Kingdom | The sloop was driven ashore on the coast of Lothian. She was refloated but consequently foundered. She was on a voyage from South Shields, County Durham to Leith, Lothian. |
| Deveron | United Kingdom | The schooner ran aground on the Whitburn Steel, in the North Sea off the coast of County Durham. She was on a voyage from Sunderland, County Durham to a Scottish port. She was refloated and resumed her voyage. |
| Kneebone | United Kingdom | The ship was driven ashore and wrecked at Alnwick, Northumberland. Her crew were rescued. |
| Oak | United Kingdom | The ship was lost at the mouth of the Loire. Her crew were rescued. She was on a voyage from the Clyde to Nantes, Loire-Inférieure, France. |
| Phoenix | United States | Phoenix The screw-driven passenger ship was destroyed by fire on Lake Michigan with the loss of at least 190 lives. |
| Spokesman | United Kingdom | The schooner was abandoned off the entrance to Lough Foyle. Her crew were rescued. She was presumed to have foundered. Spokesman was on a voyage from Liverpool to Londonderry. |
| Venus | United Kingdom | The ship was driven ashore at Saltfleet, Lincolnshire. She was on a voyage from Riga, Russia to Hull, Yorkshire. Venus was refloated on 27 November and was towed in to Hull. |

== 22 November ==
List of shipwrecks: 22 November 1847
| Ship | State | Description |
|---|---|---|
| Carthaginian | United Kingdom | The ship departed from Quebec City, Province of Canada, British North America for Liverpool, Lancashire. No further trace, presumed foundered with the loss of all hands. |
| Castor | United Kingdom | The brig was driven ashore and wrecked in the Bay of Luce. Her crew were rescued. |
| Eagle | United Kingdom | The ship was driven ashore and severely damaged at Port Talbot, Glamorgan. She was on a voyage from Aberystwyth, Cardiganshire to Port Talbot. |
| Emma | United Kingdom | The ship struck rocks in the Strait of Gibraltar and was damaged. She was on a voyage from Marseille, Bouches-du-Rhône, France to Falmouth, Cornwall. She put in to Gibraltar. |
| Fanny | United Kingdom | The barque ran aground on the Burbo Bank, in Liverpool Bay and was subsequently driven ashore at Crosby, Lancashire. Her crew were rescued by a lifeboat. She was on a voyage from Alexandria, Egypt to Liverpool, Lancashire. Fanny was subsequently reboarded by her crew. |
| Hopewell | United Kingdom | The ship was driven ashore at Porthdinllaen, Caernarfonshire. She was refloated. |
| Hunter | United Kingdom | The ship was run down and sunk. She was on a voyage from Lerwick, Shetland Islands to "Mydell". |
| Jane | United Kingdom | The schooner was wrecked on the West Hoyle Bank, in Liverpool Bay. Her four crew were rescued. She was on a voyage from Glandore, County Cork to Liverpool. |
| Leith Packet | United Kingdom | The ship struck the Tusker Rock and was abandoned off Bardsey Island, Pembrokeshire. Her crew were rescued by Norman (United Kingdom). Leith Packet was on a voyage from Newport, Monmouthshire to Stirling. She subsequently came ashore at Porthdinllaen, Caernarfonshire. |
| Maggy Lauder | United Kingdom | The schooner was driven ashore and wrecked on Stroma, Orkney Islands. Her crew were rescued. She was on a voyage from Bristol, Gloucestershire to Wick, Caithness. |
| Majestic | United Kingdom | The ship struck a sunken rock in Loch Don and was beached at Tobermory, Isle of Mull, Outer Hebrides. |
| Mary Jane | United Kingdom | The brig was driven ashore and wrecked at Sunderland, County Durham. She was on a voyage from Antwerp, Belgium to Sunderland. |
| Olive Branch | United Kingdom | The ship was driven ashore at Port Talbot, Glamorgan. She was refloated on 24 November. |
| Sisters | United Kingdom | The ship was driven ashore at Port Talbot. She was refloated on 24 November. |
| Triumph | United Kingdom | The ship was wrecked off Hermetray, Outer Hebrides. Her crew were rescued. She was on a voyage from the Clyde to Fraserburgh, Aberdeenshire. |

== 23 November ==
List of shipwrecks: 23 November 1847
| Ship | State | Description |
|---|---|---|
| Agitator | United Kingdom | The ship ran aground at the entrance to the Sharpness Canal. She was on a voyage from Alexandria, Egypt to Gloucester. She was refloated the next day. |
| Caroline Emilie | Prussia | The ship was wrecked at the Surophead Lighthouse, Russia. She was on a voyage from Saint Petersburg, Russia to Liebau. |
| Expedition | United Kingdom | The ship ran aground at the mouth of the Seine. She was on a voyage from Gloucester to Rouen, Seine-Inférieure, France. She was refloated and taken in to Havre de Grâce in a leaky condition. |
| Jane and Sarah | United Kingdom | The ship was wrecked near Amlwch, Anglesey. Her crew were rescued. She was on a voyage from Liverpool, Lancashire to Truro, Cornwall. |
| Janet | United Kingdom | The ship was wrecked on "Begnes Island". County Kerry. She was on a voyage from Cork to Cahersiveen, County Kerry. |
| Lavinia | United Kingdom | The ship was driven ashore at Port Talbot, Glamorgan. She was on a voyage from Fowey, Cornwall to Port Talbot. |
| Magnet | (United Kingdom of Great Britain and Ireland) British North America | The steamship struck a rock and sank at the entrance to the Beauharnois Canal. She was on a voyage from Montreal to Hamilton, Province of Canada. |
| Olive Branch | United Kingdom | The ship was driven ashore and severely damaged at Port Talbot. She was on a voyage from Fowey to Port Talbot. She was refloated on 26 November. |
| Two Sisters | United Kingdom | The ship was driven ashore at Port Talbot. She was on a voyage from Fowey to Port Talbot. |
| Underwood | United Kingdom | The ship was driven ashore at Odesa. |

== 24 November ==
List of shipwrecks: 24 November 1847
| Ship | State | Description |
|---|---|---|
| Ashley | United Kingdom | The ship ran aground on the Musgodobit Ledges. She was on a voyage from London to Saint John, New Brunswick, British North America. She was refloated and put in to Halifax, Nova Scotia, British North America. She arrived on 30 November. |
| Ellen and Mary | United Kingdom | The ship was driven ashore near Pwllheli, Caernarfonshire. She was on a voyage from Poole, Dorset to Runcorn, Cheshire. She was later refloated. |

== 25 November ==
List of shipwrecks: 25 November 1847
| Ship | State | Description |
|---|---|---|
| Alabama | United States | The ship ran aground on Minots Ledge, off Boston, Massachusetts and sank. All on board were rescued. She was on a voyage from Liverpool, Lancashire, United Kingdom to Boston. |
| Dolphin | United Kingdom | The ship was departed from Seville, Spain for Lisbon, Portugal. No further trace, presumed foundered with the loss of all hands. |
| Haidee | United Kingdom | The ship was wrecked at "Ullua", British Honduras. |
| Leopold I | Belgium | The ship capsized and sank off Haiti with the loss of seven of her eight crew. The survivor was rescued by Tricolor (France). Leopold I was on a voyage from Jacmel, Haiti to Falmouth, Cornwall, United Kingdom. |
| Mary Jane | United Kingdom | The sloop was driven ashore and wrecked at Sunderland, County Durham. She was on a voyage from Antwerp, Belgium to Sunderland. |
| Massema | France | The ship ran aground on the Scroby Sands, Norfolk, United Kingdom and was abandoned by her crew. She was on a voyage from Nantes, Loire-Inférieure to Sunderland. |
| Tronderen | Norway | The ship was driven ashore at Kvalsund. She was on a voyage from Tromsø to Venice, Kingdom of Lombardy–Venetia. |

== 26 November ==
List of shipwrecks: 26 November 1847
| Ship | State | Description |
|---|---|---|
| Athens | United Kingdom | The ship was driven ashore by ice at Brielle, South Holland. She had been refloated by 27 December and taken in to Rozenburg. |
| George | United Kingdom | The ship was driven ashore and wrecked at Dungarvan, County Waterford. She was on a voyage from Cardiff, Glamorgan to Cork. |
| Jean and Jessy | United Kingdom | The ship was driven ashore at Cullercoats, County Durham. She was on a voyage from South Shields to Dundee, Forfarshire. She was refloated with assistance from Anne and Jane (United Kingdom and towed back to South Shields. |
| Mary Bull | United Kingdom | The ship was wrecked at Narva, Russia. Her crew were rescued. She was on a voyage from Saint Petersburg, Russia to London. |
| Penrith | United Kingdom | The ship was wrecked on the Goodwin Sands, Kent with the loss of her captain. She was on a voyage from Rio de Janeiro, Brazil to Hamburg. |
| Planet | United Kingdom | The ship struck the Newcombe Sand, in the North Sea. A tug towed her in to Lowestoft, Suffolk, where she sank. |

== 27 November ==
List of shipwrecks: 27 November 1847
| Ship | State | Description |
|---|---|---|
| Admiral Jervis | United Kingdom | The ship was driven ashore at Theddlethorpe, Lincolnshire. She was on a voyage from Hartlepool, County Durham to London. She was refloated and resumed her voyage. |
| Alcedo | United Kingdom | The ship was driven ashore at Kingstown, County Dublin. She was on a voyage from Liverpool, Lancashire to Cork. She was refloated and taken in to Dublin. |
| Dawson | United Kingdom | The brig struck the Whiting Sand in the North Sea off the coast of Suffolk and was damaged. She was on a voyage from Stockton-on-Tees, County Durham to London. |
| Emma | United Kingdom | The ship was driven ashore at Hanko, Grand Duchy of Finland with the loss of two of her nine crew. She was on a voyage from Saint Petersburg, Russia to London. |
| Stirling | (United Kingdom of Great Britain and Ireland) New South Wales | The barque was wrecked in the San Bernardino Strait. Her crew were rescued She was on a voyage from Sydney to Manila, Spanish East Indies. |
| Viscountess Canning | United Kingdom | The ship was driven ashore at Dymchurch, Kent. She was on a voyage from London to the Cape Coast Castle. She was refloated on 22 December and towed in to Folkestone, Kent. |

== 28 November ==
List of shipwrecks: 28 November 1847
| Ship | State | Description |
|---|---|---|
| Sisters | United Kingdom | The sloop was driven ashore and wrecked at Pulteneytown, Caithness. Her four crew were rescued. She was on a voyage from Dundee, Forfarshire to Pulteneytown. |

== 29 November ==
List of shipwrecks: 29 November 1847
| Ship | State | Description |
|---|---|---|
| Anne and Mary | United Kingdom | The sloop was driven ashore at Southport, Lancashire. Her crew were rescued. She was on a voyage from Annan, Dumfriesshire to Liverpool, Lancashire. Anne and Mary was refloated on 6 December and taken in to Liverpool. |
| Aurora | United States | The ship was driven ashore 7 nautical miles (13 km) north of Barnegat, New Jersey. She was on a voyage from Liverpool to Philadelphia, Pennsylvania. |
| Jan Willem | Netherlands | The barque foundered in the Atlantic Ocean (46°45′N 11°04′W). Her crew were rescued by Charbruker (United Kingdom). Jan Willen was on a voyage from Amsterdam, North Holland to Constantinople, Ottoman Empire. |
| Paul Martyz | Wismar | The ship ran aground off Dragør, Denmark. She was on a voyage from Wismar to London, United Kingdom. She was refloated and put in to Copenhagen, Denmark in a leaky condition. |
| Try Again | United Kingdom | The ship ran aground off Pictou, Nova Scotia, British North America. She was on a voyage from Miramichi, New Brunswick, British North America to Cork. She was refloated and taken in to Pictou. |
| Wilson Rothery | United Kingdom | The ship was driven ashore near Maryport, Cumberland. She was on a voyage from Dumfries to Maryport. |

== 30 November ==
List of shipwrecks: 30 November 1847
| Ship | State | Description |
|---|---|---|
| Astley | United Kingdom | The collier, a brig, caught fire and was scuttled in the River Thames at Greenwich, Kent. |
| Chapman | United Kingdom | The ship ran aground on Helsingør, Denmark. She was refloated and taken in to Helsingør. |
| Eva | United Kingdom | The ship ran aground on the Skagen Reef. She was on a voyage from Belfast, County Antrim to Copenhagen, Denmark. |
| Mermaid | United Kingdom | The smack foundered in Aberdaron Bay. Her crew were rescued. |
| Pilot | United Kingdom | The schooner struck the Whitby Rock and sank. Her crew were rescued. |
| Smi | Imperial Russian Navy | The frigate was driven ashore at Novorossiysk. |
| Struya | Imperial Russian Navy | The tender was driven ashore at Novorossiysk. |
| Wannan | United Kingdom | The ship ran aground on the Seven Stones Reef off the coast of Cornwall. she was on a voyage from Liverpool, Lancashire to the Rio Grande. She was refloated and put in to Falmouth, Cornwall in a leaky condition. |

== Unknown date ==
List of shipwrecks: Unknown date 1847
| Ship | State | Description |
|---|---|---|
| Acton | United Kingdom | The ship was abandoned in the Atlantic Ocean before 10 November. her crew were rescued by Caroline (United Kingdom). She was on a voyage from the Clyde to New York. |
| Amelia | United Kingdom | The ship was sighted off Ouessant, Finistère, France in early November whilst on a voyage from Alexandria, Egypt of Falmouth, Cornwall. No further trace, presumed foundered with the loss of all hands. |
| Ann | Spain | The ship was abandoned in the Atlantic Ocean before 13 November. All on board were rescued by Ellen Hamilton (United Kingdom). Ann was on a voyage from Havana, Cuba to New York. |
| Ann | United Kingdom | The ship was driven ashore whilst on a voyage from Odesa to Cork or Falmouth. She was refloated and put in to Malta in a leaky condition. She arrived at Malta on 25 November. |
| Antonio | Spain | The steamship was abandoned in the Mediterranean Sea off Algiers, Algeria before 20 November. |
| Atlantic | United Kingdom | The ship was wrecked on the Goodwin Sands, Kent with the loss of four lives. Survivors were rescued by several vessels, including the lugger Prince of Wales (United Kingdom). |
| Burgundy | United States | The ship was wrecked on the Longsand, in the North Sea off the coast of Essex, United Kingdom. Ninety-nine of her 300 passengers were landed at Harwich, Essed. Sixty-eight passengers were rescued by Tryal (United Kingdom). Burgundy was on a voyage from Bremen to New Orleans, Louisiana. |
| Charles Saunders | United Kingdom | The ship ran aground at Miramichi, New Brunswick, British North America before 11 November. She was refloated on 12 November and resumed her voyage to Hull, Yorkshire. |
| Cotton | (United Kingdom of Great Britain and Ireland) British North America | The brigantine was abandoned in the Atlantic Ocean before 4 November. |
| Deux Amis | France | The ship was wrecked on the Île de Riou, Bouches-du-Rhône before 20 November. |
| Diamant | France | The brig was lost in the Black Sea before 9 November with the loss of all but one of her crew. |
| Elizabeth | United Kingdom | The brig was abandoned in the Atlantic Ocean before 12 November. Her crew were rescued by Peter and John. |
| Emilius | Denmark | The jacht sank off Anholt in early November. Her crew were rescued. |
| Frithiof | Russia | The ship departed from Hull for South Shields, County Durham, United Kingdom. No further trace, presumed foundered with the loss of all hands. |
| Gange, or Guage | France | The whaler was struck by lightning and severely damaged off Hanalie, Sandwich Islands before 6 November. |
| Hebe | Netherlands | The ship foundered in the Black Sea before 30 November. She was on a voyage from Odesa to Amsterdam, North Holland. |
| Hebe | United Kingdom | The ship was driven ashore in the Bosphorus opposite Therapia, Ottoman Empire. |
| Hendric | Prussia | The ship sank off "Ancona" before 5 November. She was on a voyage from Rügenwalde to King's Lynn, Norfolk, United Kingdom. |
| Hope | United Kingdom | The ship was wrecked on the Essex coast. |
| Juan | Danzig | The ship was driven ashore on Gotland, Sweden before 4 November. her crew were rescued. |
| Lady Seton | United Kingdom | The barque was wrecked on Île Brion, Magdalen Islands, Nova Scotia, British North America in late November with the loss of two of her crew. She was on a voyage from Quebec City, Province of Canada, British North America to an English port. |
| Lord David | (United Kingdom of Great Britain and Ireland) British North America | The schooner was driven ashore at St. Thomas's between 16 and 23 November. She was on a voyage from Quebec City to Montreal, Province of Canada. Lord David was refloated on 26 November and completed her voyage. |
| Miquelonneau | (United Kingdom of Great Britain and Ireland) Jersey | The ship was wrecked on the coast of Labrador, British North America before 19 November. Her crew were rescued by Swift ( (United Kingdom of Great Britain and Ireland) ) Jersey). |
| Miscau | (United Kingdom of Great Britain and Ireland) British North America | The schooner was driven ashore near Point Escuminac, New Brunswick before 23 December. |
| Narderda | Russia | The brig was wrecked at Tenedos, Ottoman Empire before 29 November. She was on a voyage from a Russian port to Livorno, Grand Duchy of Tuscany and Marseille, Bouches-du-Rhône, France. |
| Oratava | (United Kingdom of Great Britain and Ireland) New South Wales | The ship, a brigantine or schooner, was wrecked on the Ontong Java Atoll. Her crew were rescued. |
| Paul Murty | Wismar | The schooner ran aground off Dragør, Denmark. She was on a voyage from Wismar to an English port. She was refloated on 29 November. |
| Petrel | (United Kingdom of Great Britain and Ireland) New South Wales | The schooner was driven ashore near the mouth of the Richmond River. She was refloated. |
| Portugencia | Portugal | The ship was wrecked before 8 November. She was on a voyage from the Isla do Sul to San Antonion Island. |
| Primis | France | The ship was driven ashore at "Silvi Bonru" before 29 November. She was on a voyage from Taganrog, Russia to Marseille. |
| Racer | United Kingdom | The ship was abandoned in the Atlantic Ocean. Her crew were rescued by Mary Jane (United Kingdom). Racer was on a voyage from Liverpool to Richibucto, New Brunswick. |
| Robinson | United Kingdom | The brig was abandoned in the Atlantic Ocean by all but two of her crew. They were rescued on 17 November by the barque British Isles (United Kingdom), which put four of her own crew on board. Robinson was on a voyage from Berbice, British Guiana to Glasgow, Renfrewshire. She was taken in to Falmouth in mid-December. |
| Saldanha Bay Packet | (United Kingdom of Great Britain and Ireland) Cape Colony | The ship was wrecked in Three Anchor Bay before 22 November. her crew were rescued. |
| Sons of Commerce | United Kingdom | The ship was driven ashore near Alexandria. She was on a voyage from Alexandria to Cork. She was refloated and put in to Malta in a leaky condition. She arrived at Malta on 26 November. |
| Surrey | United Kingdom | The ship was wrecked on Prince Edward Island, British North America. She was on a voyage from Quebec City to Hull. |
| Swift | United Kingdom | The sloop was wrecked on the Shambles, in the English Channel off the coast of Dorset with the loss of all on board. She was on a voyage from Falmouth to London. |
