= List of shipwrecks in July 1834 =

The list of shipwrecks in July 1834 includes ships sunk, foundered, wrecked, grounded or otherwise lost during July 1834.

== 1 July ==
List of shipwrecks: 1 July 1834
Ship	State	Description
Vesta	Belgium	The ship struck rocks off Plouguerneau, Finistère, France and was beached. She was on a voyage from Antwerp to St. Ubes, Spain.

== 2 July ==
List of shipwrecks: 2 July 1834
Ship	State	Description
Rapid	United Kingdom	The ship was lost in the Bonny River, Nigeria. Her crew were rescued.

== 3 July ==
List of shipwrecks: 3 July 1834
Ship	State	Description
Earl of Liverpool	United Kingdom	The ship was driven ashore on the east coast of Cocos Island. Her crew were rescued. She was on a voyage from Singapore to London.
Mars	United Kingdom	The brig was wrecked on East Falkland, Falkland Islands. Her crew took to the boat and were rescued 45 days later by HMS Sparrowhawk (Royal Navy). Mars was on a voyage from Launceston, Van Diemen's Land to London.
Reform	United Kingdom	The ship departed from Saint Domingue for a British port. No further trace, presumed foundered with the loss of all hands.

== 4 July ==
List of shipwrecks: 4 July 1834
Ship	State	Description
Georgetown	United Kingdom	The ship was destroyed by fire at Demerara.
Jenny	France	The ship was driven ashore near Calais.

== 5 July ==
List of shipwrecks: 5 July 1834
Ship	State	Description
Huskisson	United Kingdom	The ship was wrecked on the Isla de Flores, Uruguay. Her crew were rescued. She was on a voyage from Liverpool, Lancashire to Buenos Aires, Argentina.

== 7 July ==
List of shipwrecks: 7 July 1834
Ship	State	Description
Aurora	United Kingdom	The ship was wrecked on the Marquis Key. Her crew were rescued. She was on a voyage from Jamaica to Liverpool, Lancashire.

== 8 July ==
List of shipwrecks: 8 July 1834
Ship	State	Description
Harmonia	Portugal	The ship was wrecked near Porto. She was on a voyage from Pernambuco, Brazil to Porto.

== 9 July ==
List of shipwrecks: 9 July 1834
Ship	State	Description
Trajano	Spain	The ship was driven ashore near Marbella. She was on a voyage from Sète, Hérault, France to New York, United States.

== 11 July ==
List of shipwrecks: 11 July 1834
Ship	State	Description
Emelie	United Kingdom	The ship was wrecked on the Black Rock Sand, Dundalk, County Louth. Her crew were rescued.
Susan	United States	The ship was wrecked on Scaterie Island, Nova Scotia, British North America. Her crew were rescued. She was on a voyage from Boston, Massachusetts to Miramichi, New Brunswick, British North America.
Susannah	United States	The ship was wrecked on Scaterie Island. Her crew were rescued. She was on a voyage from New York to Richibucto, New Brunswick, British North America.

== 12 July ==
List of shipwrecks: 12 July 1834
Ship	State	Description
Amizade	Brazil	The brig capsized at Lisbon, Portugal.

== 13 July ==
List of shipwrecks: 13 July 1834
Ship	State	Description
Alexander	United Kingdom	The ship was wrecked near Cape St Vincent, Spain. Her crew were rescued. She was on a voyage from Cardiff, Glamorgan to Marseille, Bouches-du-Rhône, France.

== 15 July ==
List of shipwrecks: 15 July 1834
Ship	State	Description
Downe Castle	United Kingdom	The ship was driven ashore on Texel, North Holland, Netherlands. She was on a voyage from Amsterdam, North Holland to Newcastle upon Tyne, Northumberland.

== 18 July ==
List of shipwrecks: 18 July 1834
Ship	State	Description
Jabley	United Kingdom	The flat was wrecked in the Menai Strait. She was on a voyage from Chester, Cheshire to Beaumaris, Anglesey.
Sarah	United Kingdom	The ship was abandoned in the North Sea off the mouth of the Humber. She was on a voyage from Goole, Yorkshire to London.

== 19 July ==
List of shipwrecks: 19 July 1834
Ship	State	Description
Avon	United Kingdom	The ship was driven ashore at Portreath, Cornwall. She was on a voyage from Newport, Monmouthshire to the Isles of Scilly.
Henry Grattan	United Kingdom	The ship was wrecked at Long Beach, New Jersey, United States. All on board were rescued. She was on a voyage from Londonderry to Philadelphia, Pennsylvania, United States.
John	United Kingdom	The ship foundered off the Gore Sands, in the Bristol Channel.
Lambton	United Kingdom	The ship was wrecked at Staithes, Yorkshire. Her crew were rescued.
Nimrod	United States	The steamboat ran aground on the Quick-run-bar, in the Ohio River 90 miles (140 km) above Cincinnati, Ohio. Her steam pipe burst, causing the death of eight people.
Prosperous	United Kingdom	The ship was driven ashore at Portreath. Her crew were rescued. She was on a voyage from Swansea, Glamorgan to Newhaven, Sussex.
Retrieve	(United Kingdom of Great Britain and Ireland) Saint Vincent	The drogher foundered in a squall. Her crew were rescued.
Robert	United Kingdom	The ship was wrecked at Staithes. Her crew were rescued.
Union	United Kingdom	The ship was driven ashore at Portreath. her crew were rescued. She was on a voyage from Newport, Monmouthshire to the Isles of Scilly.

== 22 July ==
List of shipwrecks: 22 July 1834
Ship	State	Description
Ugonia	France	The ship was abandoned in the Atlantic Ocean 100 nautical miles (190 km) west of Cape St Vincent, Portugal. Her crew were rescued by Margaret (United Kingdom). Ugonia was on a voyage from Marseille, Bouches-du-Rhône to Liverpool, Lancashire, United Kingdom.

== 23 July ==
List of shipwrecks: 23 July 1834
Ship	State	Description
Industry	United Kingdom	The ship was wrecked at Wilmington, Delaware, United States.

== 24 July ==
List of shipwrecks: 24 July 1834
Ship	State	Description
Atlas	United Kingdom	The ship was wrecked on the Appo Shoal. She was on a voyage from China to Batavia, Netherlands East Indies.

== 25 July ==
List of shipwrecks: 25 July 1834
Ship	State	Description
Ewell	United Kingdom	The ship was wrecked on a reef whilst on a voyage from Port Morant to Carlisle Bay, Jamaica.

== 26 July ==
List of shipwrecks: 26 July 1834
Ship	State	Description
Esk	United Kingdom	The ship was wrecked on Muckle Skerry, Orkney Islands. She was on a voyage from Brora, Sutherland to Tongue, Sutherland.

== 27 July ==
List of shipwrecks: 27 July 1834
Ship	State	Description
Duchess of Richmond	United Kingdom	The ship was lost off "Bauffo Island". Her crew were rescued. She was on a voyage from Sierra Leone to the Clyde.
Schnelheit en Jonge	Netherlands	The ship was wrecked on the Haisborough Sands, in the North Sea off the coast of Norfolk, United Kingdom. Her crew were rescued. She was on a voyage from Libava, Courland Governorate to Schiedam, South Holland.

== 28 July ==
List of shipwrecks: 28 July 1834
Ship	State	Description
Sicilian	United Kingdom	The ship ran aground on the Cross Sand, in the North Sea off the coast of Norfolk, and sank. Her crew were rescued. She was on a voyage from Newcastle upon Tyne, Northumberland to London.

== 29 July ==
List of shipwrecks: 29 July 1834
Ship	State	Description
Jean Stuart	United Kingdom	The ship was wrecked on Barbuda. She was on a voyage from Liverpool, Lancashire to Saint Thomas, Virgin Islands.

== 30 July ==
List of shipwrecks: 30 July 1834
Ship	State	Description
Hebe	United Kingdom	The ship was driven ashore at Brancaster, Norfolk.

== Unknown date ==
List of shipwrecks: Unknown date 1834
Ship	State	Description
Caroline	France	The ship foundered in the Gulf of Mexico before 18 July. She was on a voyage from Tuxpan, Mexico to Marseille, Bouches-du-Rhône.
Edward and Eliza	United Kingdom	The ship was wrecked at Moulmein, Burma before 26 July. She was on a voyage from "Akyale" to Madras, India.
Helen	(United Kingdom of Great Britain and Ireland) Jamaica	The drogher was lost in Innis Bay, Jamaica before 23 July.
Isabella Simpson	United Kingdom	The ship was wrecked on Cape Chat, Lower Canada, British North America. She was on a voyage from Kirkcaldy Kirkcudbrightshire to Quebec City, Lower Canada.
Leonidas	United States	The ship was lost at Pernambuco, Brazil before 30 July.
Six Sisters	United Kingdom	The ship sprang a leak and foundered before 5 July. She was on a voyage from Gallipoli, Ottoman Empire to Liverpool, Lancashire.
