= List of shipwrecks in June 1841 =

The list of shipwrecks in June 1841 includes ships sunk, foundered, wrecked, grounded, or otherwise lost during June 1841.

== 1 June ==
List of shipwrecks: 1 June 1841
Ship	State	Description
Jane	United Kingdom	The ship ran aground at Bridport, Dorset. She was on a voyage from South Shields, County Durham to Bridport.
Margaret	United Kingdom	The ship sprang a leak and foundered off Kinnaird Head, Aberdeenshire. Her crew were rescued. She was on a voyage from Easdale, Argyllshire to Berwick upon Tweed, Northumberland.

== 2 June ==
List of shipwrecks: 2 June 1841
Ship	State	Description
Eliza & Nancy	United Kingdom	The ship was driven ashore near the Filsand Lighthouse, Russia. She was on a voyage from Madeira to Saint Petersburg. Eliza & Nancy was refloated and taken into Saint Petersburg.
HMS Skipjack	Royal Navy	The schooner was wrecked on Grand Cayman. Her crew survived.

== 3 June ==
List of shipwrecks: 3 June 1841
Ship	State	Description
Ellen Jane	United Kingdom	The ship was wrecked on the Goodwin Sands, Kent with the loss of five of the fourteen people on board. She was on a voyage from Saint Kitts to London.
Frederic	Spain	The brig was capsized by a waterspout in the Atlantic Ocean. She was on a voyage from New Orleans, Louisiana, United States to San Juan, Puerto Rico.

== 4 June ==
List of shipwrecks: 4 June 1841
Ship	State	Description
Constantia	Portugal	The ship was struck by lightning and was abandoned by her crew in the Dogger Bank. She drove ashore on Juist, Kingdom of Hanover on 19 June.
Louise	United Kingdom	The ship sprang a leak and was abandoned off "Steenberg", Denmark. Her crew were rescued. She was on a voyage from London to Stettin. Louise was driven ashore and wrecked near Frederikshavn on 9 June.
Wilhelmine	Danzig	The ship departed from Newcastle upon Tyne, Northumberland, United Kingdom for Danzig. No further trace, presumed foundered with the loss of all hands.

== 6 June ==
List of shipwrecks: 6 June 1841
Ship	State	Description
Atlas	United Kingdom	The ship ran aground on the Burbo Bank, in Liverpool Bay. She was refloated but consequently sank. Atlas was on a voyage from Liverpool, Lancashire to Antwerp, Belgium.
Forrest	United Kingdom	The ship was driven ashore and wrecked at Peterhead, Aberdeenshire. She was on a voyage from Sunderland, County Durham to Findhorn, Elginshire.
Hudson	United Kingdom	The ship ran aground near Kuressaare, Russia. She was on a voyage from Matanzas, Cuba to Saint Petersburg, Russia.

== 7 June ==
List of shipwrecks: 7 June 1841
Ship	State	Description
Charles	United States	The ship was abandoned whilst on a voyage from New Orleans, Louisiana to Havre de Grâce, Seine-Inférieure, France. Her crew were rescued by Louis XIV (France).
Elizabeth	United Kingdom	The steamship was wrecked on the Herd Sand, in the North Sea off the coast of County Durham.

== 8 June ==
List of shipwrecks: 8 June 1841
Ship	State	Description
Concord	United Kingdom	The ship struck the lock at Cardiff, Glamorgan and was damaged. She was on a voyage from Cardiff to Porto, Portugal. Concord put back to Cardiff for repairs.
Elizabeth	United Kingdom	The ship was wrecked at Baadsted, Sweden with the loss of all hands. She was on a voyage from Danzig to Perth.
Godefroy	Netherlands	The ship was driven ashore on the coast of Delaware, United States. She was refloated.
Mary and Jean	United Kingdom	The ship caught fire at Orchardnook, Perthshire and was scuttled.
Pilot	United States	The barque was driven ashore on the coast of Delaware. She was later refloated.
Preciosa	France	The ship was driven ashore and wrecked near Swinemünde, Prussia. Her crew were rescued.

== 10 June ==
List of shipwrecks: 10 June 1841
Ship	State	Description
Millman	United Kingdom	The ship ran aground and was severely damaged at St. Ubes, Portugal. She was on a voyage from London to St. Ubes. Millman was later refloated.
Oswen	United Kingdom	The ship was driven ashore on Green Island, British North America. She was on a voyage from Sunderland, County Durham to Quebec City, Province of Canada, British North America. Oswen was refloated on 30 July and taken into Quebec City for repairs.
Trinity	United Kingdom	The yacht was driven ashore at Gibraltar. She was on a voyage from Liverpool, Lancashire to Gibraltar. Trinity was refloated on 28 June.
William Pitt	United Kingdom	The ship ran aground in the River Tyne near Wallsend, Northumberland. She was on a voyage from Riga, Russia to Newcastle upon Tyne.

== 11 June ==
List of shipwrecks: 11 June 1841
Ship	State	Description
Experiment	United Kingdom	The schooner was wrecked near the mouth of the Setary River, Burma. Her crew were rescued.
Memnon	United Kingdom	The brig was wrecked at Calcutta, India. Her crew survived. She was on a voyage from Canton, China to Liverpool, Lancashire.

== 12 June ==
List of shipwrecks: 12 June 1841n
Ship	State	Description
David Scott	United Kingdom	The East Indiaman was destroyed by fire at Mauritius. Her crew survived. She was on a voyage from Calcutta, India to London.

== 13 June ==
List of shipwrecks: 13 June 1841
Ship	State	Description
Theresa	Stettin	The ship was wrecked off Bornholm, Denmark. Her crew were rescued. She was on a voyage from Saint Petersburg, Russia to Stettin.

== 14 June ==
List of shipwrecks: 14 June 1841
Ship	State	Description
Wilhelmine	Elbing	The ship was driven ashore and wrecked at Thornham, Norfolk, United Kingdom. She was on a voyage from Elbing to Thornham.

== 16 June ==
List of shipwrecks: 16 June 1841
Ship	State	Description
Aristede	France	The ship, which had caught fire on 5 June, put into San Juan, Puerto Rico and was scuttled. She was on a voyage from Cayenne, French Guiana to Havre de Grâce, Seine-Inférieure.
North Star	United Kingdom	The paddle steamer ran ashore and was damaged 10 nautical miles (19 km) north of Montrose, Forfarshire. She was on a voyage from Hull, Yorkshire to Aberdeen. She was refloated on 18 June and taken into Aberdeen.
Pleiades	United Kingdom	The brig sprang a leak and sank in the North Sea 15 nautical miles (28 km) off Sunderland, County Durham. Her crew survived.

== 17 June ==
List of shipwrecks: 17 June 1841
Ship	State	Description
Colina	United Kingdom	The brig foundered in the North Sea (52°55′N 3°00′E). Her crew survived. She was on a voyage from Newcastle upon Tyne, Northumberland to Rotterdam, South Holland, Netherlands. Barratry was suspected. A crew member pleaded guilty and was sentenced to transportation for life.
St. George	United Kingdom	The ship was wrecked Cats Keys, off the coast of the Florida Territory with the loss of seventeen of her crew.

== 18 June ==
List of shipwrecks: 18 June 1841
Ship	State	Description
Ann and Maria	United Kingdom	The ship ran aground and capsized near "Whitford", Glamorgan. She was on a voyage from Llanelly to Swansea. She was later righted.

== 20 June ==
List of shipwrecks: 20 June 1841
Ship	State	Description
Flirt	United Kingdom	The ship ran aground on the Warrington Reef, off Antigua. She was later refloated.
Maria	United Kingdom	The ship ran aground on the Barber Sand, in the North Sea off the coast of Essex. She was on a voyage from Hartlepool, County Durham to London. She was later refloated.

== 21 June ==
List of shipwrecks: 21 June 1841
Ship	State	Description
Republic	United Kingdom	The ship was destroyed by fire at Mauritius.

== 22 June ==
List of shipwrecks: 22 June 1841
Ship	State	Description
Rivals	United Kingdom	The ship was wrecked on the Conflict Reef. She was on a voyage from Liverpool, Lancashire to Rio Nuñez.

== 23 June ==
List of shipwrecks: 23 June 1841
Ship	State	Description
Sydney and Jane	United Kingdom	The ship ran aground near Brouwershaven, Zeeland, Netherlands. She was on a voyage from Liverpool, Lancashire to Dordrecht, South Holland, Netherlands.

== 24 June ==
List of shipwrecks: 24 June 1841
Ship	State	Description
Æneas	United Kingdom	The ship capsized at Cork.
Belle	United States	The ship was wrecked on Long Island, New York. She was on a voyage from New York City to Madeira.
Gleaner	United Kingdom	The ship sank at Shoreham-by-Sea, Sussex.
Henry Hoyle	(United Kingdom of Great Britain and Ireland) South Australia	The ship struck the Whirlpool Rock and foundered off Point Rapid. She was refloated in August and taken into Launceston, Van Diemen's Land, arriving on 6 August.
Isabella	(United Kingdom of Great Britain and Ireland) Grenada	The sloop was driven ashore and wrecked at Telescope Point.
Magog	United Kingdom	The ship was holed by her anchor and sank at Dalhousie, New Brunswick, British North America. She was refloated, beached and repaired.

== 25 June ==
List of shipwrecks: 25 June 1841
Ship	State	Description
George Dean	United Kingdom	The ship ran aground on the Haaks Bank, in the North Sea off the Dutch coast. She was on a voyage from Rio de Janeiro, Brazil to Bremen. George Dean was refloated and taken into the Vlie.
Reliance	United Kingdom	The ship was driven ashore and wrecked near Mizen Head, County Cork. She was on a voyage from Wicklow to Newcastle upon Tyne, Northumberland.
Yeoman	United States	The ship was driven ashore west of the Fire Island Lighthouse, New York. She was on a voyage from New York City to Dunkirk, Nord, France. Yeoman was refloated and taken into New York City for repairs.

== 26 June ==
List of shipwrecks: 26 June 1841
Ship	State	Description
McNeil	United Kingdom	The ship was wrecked on the Jardanillos. Her crew were rescued. She was on a voyage from Cuba to Quebec City, Province of Canada, British North America.

== 27 June ==
List of shipwrecks: 27 June 1841
Ship	State	Description
Montreal	(United Kingdom of Great Britain and Ireland) British North America	The ship was wrecked on Cross Island, Maine, United States. She was on a voyage from New York, United States to Saint John, New Brunswick.

== 28 June ==
List of shipwrecks: 28 June 1841
Ship	State	Description
Joseph Hume	United Kingdom	The smack ran aground on the Whiting Sand, in the North Sea off the coast of Suffolk. She was on a voyage from Aberdeen to London. Joseph Hume was refloated and towed into Aldeburgh, Suffolk by the pilot cutter Salisbury (United Kingdom).
Rosalind	United Kingdom	The ship was wrecked on the Shipwash Sand, in the North Sea off the coast of Suffolk. Her crew were rescued. She was on a voyage from South Shields, County Durham to Teignmouth, Devon.
Three Brothers	United Kingdom	The ship was wrecked on St. Paul Island, Nova Scotia, British North America. Her crew were rescued.

== 30 June ==
List of shipwrecks: 30 June 1841
Ship	State	Description
Olive	United States	The ship was destroyed by fire at New York. She was on a voyage from Apalachicola, Florida Territory to New York.

== Unknown date ==
List of shipwrecks: Unknown date in June 1841
Ship	State	Description
Belle Guise	France	The ship ran aground on the French Key. She was on a voyage from Grenada to Marseille, Bouches-du-Rhône. Belle Guise was refloated and put into Nassau, Bahamas, where she was condemned.
Charles	(United Kingdom of Great Britain and Ireland) British North America	The schooner was abandoned in the Atlantic Ocean.
Connecine von Lambert or Constantin Frau Weaborg	Flag unknown	The barque was abandoned in the North Sea on or before 5 June.
Cornwallis	United Kingdom	In June 1841 Cornwallis was in Bombay harbour, India, loading a cargo of cotton for China when she caught fire. There was "a strong impression that this fine old ship was wilfully set on fire."
George Clark	United Kingdom	The brig ran aground on the Maplin Sand, in the North Sea off the coast of Essex. She was refloated on 9 June.
Invoice	United Kingdom	The ship ran aground in the Dardanelles. She was on a voyage from London to Constantinople, Ottoman Empire. Invoice was refloated with assistance from Hannah and taken into Constantinople.
Laybrook	United States	The schooner was wrecked in Pensacola Bay.
Pollux	Grand Duchy of Tuscany	The paddle steamer was run down and sunk off Elba by Mongebello ( Kingdom of the Two Sicilies) with the loss of a passenger. She was on a voyage from Civitavecchia, Papal States to Livorno.
Wilsons	United Kingdom	The ship ran aground on the Blacktail Bank, in the North Sea off the coast of Essex. She was on a voyage from Newcastle upon Tyne, Northumberland to London. Wilsons was refloated and taken into Wivenhoe, Essex.
