= Atlas (1801 Quebec City ship) =

History

United Kingdom
- Name: Atlas
- Owner: W. Beatson & Company, London
- Builder: William Baldwin, Quebec
- Launched: 15 December 1801
- Fate: Last listed 1815-16

General characteristics
- Tons burthen: 547, or 553, or 554 (bm)
- Length: 119 ft (36 m)
- Beam: 33 ft (10 m)
- Depth of hold: 6 ft (1.8 m)
- Propulsion: Sail
- Armament: 1805:6 guns; 1813:12 × 12-pounder carronades

Atlas was a sailing ship built in Quebec by William Baldwin and launched in 1801 for W. Beateson & Company, London.

A letter dated 17 August 1801 cancelled her registration in Quebec.

She made her first voyage for the East India Company, sailing to New South Wales and China. On the outward leg of this voyage she carried convicts from Ireland to Australia.

Under the command of Thomas Musgrave, (Note: Earlier, Musgrave had been captain of Sugar Cane when she transported convicts from Ireland to Port Jackson in 1793. In her, he went on to discover Pingelap atoll.) She sailed from the Downs 20 February 1802. She reached Cork on 6 March, and left on 30 May carrying 194 male convicts. She reached Rio de Janeiro on 30 July, and Sydney Cove (Port Jackson), on 30 October. She landed 190 convicts fit and ready for work, having suffered four or no deaths (accounts differ), and thus demonstrating that the death toll on Atlas (1) was not inevitable. Musgrave reportedly stated that 190 of the men he transported had been United Irishmen and political prisoners, not criminals. They included James Dempsey, later prominent in the Sydney Catholic community.

Lightning struck Atlas on 5 November, damaging her. Atlas left Port Jackson on 3 January 1803 bound for China. Sometime after she left stowaways, escaped prisoners from the penal colony of Port Jackson, were discovered. Atlas ultimately returned them to England.

On 14 March she arrived at Whampoa. On her return voyage to England she arrived at Macao on 11 April, and St Helena on 1 August. She reached Cork on 30 November, and Deptford on 16 December.

Lloyd's Register continued to report Musgrave as Atlas's captain and her trade as China until the issue for 1810, when she is no longer listed. However, in 1811 she returns under the ownership of A. Tomson, with T. Hillier, master, and trading as a transport out of Cowes. Then in 1812 she was listed under the ownership of "Cockshut", R. Hall, master, and trading between London and Quebec.

Atlas was last listed in the Register of Shipping in 1815 and in Lloyd's Register in 1816.
