= List of shipwrecks in 1837 =

The list of shipwrecks in 1837 includes ships sunk, foundered, wrecked, grounded, or otherwise lost during 1837.

== Unknown date ==
List of shipwrecks: Unknown date in 1837
Ship	State	Description
Adolphe	France	The ship was wrecked at "St. Elena", Patagonia.
Amelie	France	The ship was wrecked at Saint Pierre and Miquelon.
Atlas	United States	The whaler was wrecked in the Crozet Islands. Her crew were rescued by Héroine (French Navy).
Belleisle	United Kingdom	The brig was wrecked by ice off New Brunswick, British North America.
Benjamin Franklin	United States	The schooner was lost in a gale in August or April. Lost with all 7 hands.
Brazilian Patriot	United Kingdom	The ship was lost at Newfoundland, British North America.
Briton	United Kingdom	The ship was wrecked on Christmas Island. Her crew were rescued six months later by Charles Frederick (United Kingdom) and taken to the Sandwich Islands.
Caroline	United States	The ship was lost in Chaleur Bay.
Emmée	France	The ship was wrecked on the coast of Madagascar.
Europa	United States	The whaler was wrecked in a typhoon at Vavou.
Fair America	United States	The schooner was lost in a gale in August or April. Lost with all 7 hands.
Falcon	(United Kingdom of Great Britain and Ireland) New South Wales	The whaler was wrecked on Ascension Island.
George IV	United Kingdom	The whaler was wrecked.
Helen Marr	United Kingdom	The ship was driven ashore at Pernambuco, Brazil. She was on a voyage from Pernambuco to Bahia, Brazil. Helen Marr was consequently condemned.
Independence	United States	The whaler was wrecked at Vavaʻu before 14 August.
Indien	France	The ship was wrecked at Saint Pierre and Miquelon.
Jemima	United Kingdom	The ship was wrecked at Veracruz, Mexico. She was on a voyage from Cádiz, Spain to Veracruz.
Margaret	United Kingdom	The ship was wrecked on the coast of Madagascar. Her crew were rescued.
Martha	United Kingdom	The ship was wrecked in the Paracel Islands. She was on a voyage from Liverpool to Canton, China.
Napoleon	United States	The brig was abandoned in the Atlantic Ocean between 29 July and 13 October. Her crew were rescued by Ferax (United States). She was on a voyage from Newport, Monmouthshire, United Kingdom to Charleston, South Carolina.
Petit Joseph	France	The ship was wrecked on the coast of Iceland.
Portia	United Kingdom	The ship was lost in the Gulf of Venice. Her crew were rescued.She was on a voyage from Trieste to Sicily.
Renown	United Kingdom	The ship was lost at Newfoundland.
Sea Horse	United Kingdom	The ship was wrecked on Anclote Key, Florida Territory. Her crew were rescued. She was on a voyage from Manzanilla, Trinidad to Dublin.
Sept Frères	France	The whaler foundered in the Atlantic Ocean with the loss of all hands, over 150 people. She was on a voyage from Granville, Manche to Newfoundland.
Sir R. H. Dick	United Kingdom	The ship was lost on the coast of Nova Scotia, British North America. She was on a voyage from London to Saint John, New Brunswick, British North America.
Thomas	United Kingdom	The whaler was lost in the Davis Strait. Twelve crew were rescued by Advice (United Kingdom) but ten of them died before she arrived at Sligo on 14 June.
Tiberius	Brazil	The ship foundered between 12 August and 7 September. She was on a voyage from Bahia to Africa.
Union	(United Kingdom of Great Britain and Ireland) British North America	The schooner foundered in Lake Ontario with the loss of all hands.
Vesta	United States	The schooner was lost in a gale in August or April. Lost with all 7 hands.
William I	Netherlands	The steamship was wrecked on the Lucipa Reef, Netherlands East Indies before 13 August. All 140 people on board were rescued after 35 days by HNLMS Nautilus (Royal Netherlands Navy).
