= List of shipwrecks in December 1863 =

The list of shipwrecks in December 1863 includes ships sunk, foundered, grounded, or otherwise lost during December 1863.

== 1 December ==
List of shipwrecks: 1 December 1863
Ship	State	Description
Boadicea	United Kingdom	The ship was abandoned in the Atlantic Ocean (43°58′N 36°47′W) with the loss of a crew member. Survivors took to a boat; they were rescued on 4 December by the barque Victoria (United Kingdom). Boadicea was on a voyage from Cardiff, Glamorgan to Portland.
Chebucto	United Kingdom	The brig sank at Falmouth, Cornwall. She was on a voyage from Liverpool, Lancashire to Rio de Janeiro, Brazil. She was refloated on 29 December.
Colonna	United States	The 102-ton sternwheel paddle steamer burned on the Ohio River at Indiana.
Diana	United Kingdom	The brig was driven ashore on Rat Island, Isles of Scilly. She was on a voyage from Quebec City, Province of Canada, British North America to Southampton, Hampshire. She was dismantled in situ and refloated on 8 December.
Eagle	United Kingdom	The sloop was driven ashore at Dulas, Anglesey. Her crew were rescued. She was on a voyage from Liverpool to Holyhead, Anglesey.
Gleaner	United Kingdom	The ship was last sighted on this date whilst on a voyage from a Baltic port to Grangemouth, Stirlingshire. Presumed foundered with the loss of all hands.
Hunsingo	Netherlands	The ship departed from Dover, Kent, United Kingdom for Syros, Greece and Smyrna, Ottoman Empire. She subsequently foundered in the English Channel; wreckage from the ship washed up on the cost of Somme, France in January 1864.
Lavinia	United Kingdom	The ship was driven ashore on Rat Island, Isles of Scilly. She was on a voyage from Newport, Monmouthshire to Poole, Dorset. She was dismantled in situ.
Magicienne	United Kingdom	The brig was driven onto rocks near St. Anthony's Lighthouse, Cornwall and sank. Her crew were rescued by rocket apparatus. She was on a voyage from Liverpool to Veracruz, Mexico. Magicienne was refloated on 19 December and beached at Flushing, Cornwall.
Tecumseh	United States	American Civil War: The 418-ton sidewheel paddle steamer was lost in West Baton Rouge Parish, Louisiana, Confederate States of America.
Triflin	United Kingdom	The schooner was wrecked at the Dunaverty Castle, Argyllshire. Her crew were rescued. She was on a voyage from Ayr to Liverpool.
Unnamed	United Kingdom	The schooner was driven ashore at "Ballyhaigh", County Kerry.
Unnamed	France	The schooner ran aground and sank at São Miguel Island, Azores. Her crew were rescued.

== 2 December ==
List of shipwrecks: 2 December 1863
Ship	State	Description
Aimable Julie	France	The schooner was wrecked at the Godrevy Lighthouse, Cornwall, United Kingdom with the loss of three of her six crew. She was on a voyage from Bourgneuf, Charente-Inférieure to Gloucester.
Bedascoa	Spain	The steamship struck the pier at Ramsgate, Kent, United Kingdom and was severely damaged. She was on a voyage from Vigo to Hamburg.
Beehive	United Kingdom	The schooner was driven ashore near Leasowe, Cheshire.
Bon Père	France	The ship was driven ashore at Landunvez, Finistère. She was on a voyage from Cardiff, Glamorgan, United Kingdom to Nantes, Loire-Inférieure.
Bulwark	United Kingdom	The schooner foundered off Holy Island, Anglesey. Her five crew survived. She was on a voyage from Ardrossan, Ayrshire to Belfast, County Antrim.
Demerara	United Kingdom	The full-rigged ship ran aground on the Girdler Sand, off the north Kent coast. She floated off and came ashore. Her nineteen crew were rescued the next day by the Ramsgate Lifeboat. Demerara was on a voyage from London to Greenock, Renfrewshire.
Eagle	United Kingdom	The Mersey Flat was driven ashore near Leasowe.
Factory Girl	United Kingdom	The full-rigged ship foundered in the Atlantic Ocean 150 nautical miles (280 km) west of the Isles of Scilly (50°20′N 7°00′W) with the loss of seven of her crew. Survivors were rescued by the brig Albatross (Norway). Factory Girl was on a voyage from Swansea, Glamorgan to Valparaíso, Chile.
Gaston	France	The brigantine was driven ashore and wrecked on Ouessant, Finistère. Her crew were rescued. She was on a voyage from Dieppe to Havre de Grâce, Seine-Inférieure.
Généreux	France	The ship parted from her anchors and was driven out to sea from Penmarc'h, Finistère. No further trace.
Gratitude	United Kingdom	The full-rigged ship was wrecked at Le Saint, Morbihan, France. Her crew were rescued. She was on a voyage from Bordeaux, Gironde, France to Sunderland, County Durham.
Guiding Star	United Kingdom	The ship was lost in the Atlantic Ocean.
Herald	United Kingdom	The brig ran aground on the Mouse Sand, in the North Sea off the coast of Essex and sank. Her crew seven were rescued by the schooner Pilot (United Kingdom). Herald was on a voyage from London to Hartlepool and/or South Shields, County Durham.
Hotson	United Kingdom	The schooner was driven ashore at Parkgate, Cheshire. Her crew were rescued.
Oscar	United Kingdom	The schooner was driven ashore at Plymouth, Devon. She was on a voyage from Sydney to Falmouth, Cornwall.
Providence	United Kingdom	The smack foundered off the Gore Sand, in the Bristol Channel with the loss of all hands.
Quatre Frères	France	The ship was driven ashore and wrecked at Newhaven, Sussex, United Kingdom. She was on a voyage from Calais to Bordeaux, Gironde.
Roberto Peel	Italy	The ship was run into by Secundus (Malta) and was driven ashore at Falmouth. She was on a voyage from Berdyansk, Russia to Falmouth. She was refloated with the assistance of a steamship.
Sarah	United Kingdom	The brig ran aground on the Barrows Sand. She was on a voyage from London to Sunderland. She was refloated but then driven ashore near Herne Bay, Kent. Sarah was refloated and resumed her voyage, but put in to Great Yarmouth, Norfolk in a leaky condition on 20 December.
Secundus	Malta	The barque drove into Robert Peel (United Kingdom) and was driven ashore at St Just in Roseland, Cornwall. She was on a voyage from Berdyansk to Falmouth.
Star	United Kingdom	The brigantine was abandoned off Whitstable, Kent. Her six crew were rescued by the lugger. Lively (United Kingdom). Star was on a voyage from Sunderland, County Durham to Dieppe, Seine-Inférieure, France. She was subsequently beached at Margate, Kent.
Tredegar	United Kingdom	The sloop capsized and sank off Clevedon, Somerset with the loss of four of her five crew. She was on a voyage from Newport, Monmouthshire to Bristol, Gloucestershire.
William Stoveld	United Kingdom	The brig was driven ashore and wrecked at Clovelly, Devon. Her crew were rescued. She was on a voyage from Newport, Monmouthshire to Dieppe, Seine-Inférieure, France with coal.
Unnamed	United Kingdom	The collier was driven ashore near Gwithian, Cornwall.
Unnamed	United Kingdom	The schooner was driven ashore at Cherbourg, Seine-Inférieure, France.
Four unnamed vessels	France	The ships drove ashore in the Isles of Scilly.

== 3 December ==
List of shipwrecks: 3 December 1863
Ship	State	Description
Adjutant	United Kingdom	The tug was driven from her moorings, collided with the steamship Iona (United Kingdom) and then drove ashore at the Potteries, Toxteth, Lancashire.
Adorna	United Kingdom	The collier departed from Texel, North Holland, Netherlands for the River Tyne. No further trace, presumed foundered in the North Sea with the loss of all hands.
Agenoria	United Kingdom	The fishing boat was lost in the North Sea off Terschelling, Friesland, Netherlands. Her crew were rescued.
HMS Ajax	Royal Navy	The Vengeur-class ship of the line was driven ashore at Kingstown, County Dublin. She was refloated.
Albanian	United Kingdom	The steamship collided with Scottish Belle (United Kingdom) and was then driven ashore in the River Mersey. She was on a voyage from Liverpool, Lancashire to Constantinople, Ottoman Empire. She was refloated with the assistance of three tugs and taken in to the Sloyne.
Ariel	United Kingdom	The schooner was wrecked on the Peniel Rocks, Anglesey. She was on a voyage from Belfast, County Antrim to Portmadoc, Caernarfonshire.
Argus	France	The ship was driven ashore on Île-Pelée, Manche. She was refloated with assistance from a boat sent from the ironclad Couronne (French Navy). The boat was then swamped with the loss of all sixteen people on board - two others having remained on board Argus, which then drove ashore and was wrecked with the loss of her captain.
Atlas	United Kingdom	The schooner was wrecked at Liverpool. Her crew were rescued.
Atlas	United Kingdom	The steamship departed from Marseille, Bouches-du-Rhône for Algiers, Algeria. She was subsequently wrecked at Damietta, Egypt. A notable passenger was Christine Roux.
Bardsey	United Kingdom	The ship was driven ashore and wrecked at Porthdinllaen, Caernarfonshire with the loss of a crew member. She was on a voyage from Bangor, Caernarfonshire to Llanelly, Glamorgan.
Belle	United Kingdom	The brigantine was driven into a steamship in The Downs with the loss of four or five of the ten people on board. Survivors got aboard the steamship. She was on a voyage from London to Algoa Bay. Belle was assisted in to Ramsgate, Kent by the lugger Buffalo and the tug Napoleon (both United Kingdom). She was severely damaged.
Betsey	United Kingdom	The brig was wrecked on the Trinity Sand, in the North Sea off the coast of Lincolnshire. Her crew were rescued. She was on a voyage from South Shields, County Durham to Calais, France. She was refloated on 27 December and taken in to Grimsby, Lincolnshire.
Bœotia	United Kingdom	The steamship collided with the full-rigged ship John Bunyan (United Kingdom) and then drove against the quayside at New Brighton, Cheshire and was severely damaged. She was on a voyage from Saint Thomas, Virgin Islands to Liverpool. She was refloated and taken in to Liverpool.
Breeze	United Kingdom	The schooner was driven ashore at Crosby, Lancashire. Her four crew survived. She was on a voyage from Belfast to Liverpool.
British Lion	United Kingdom	The full-rigged ship was driven ashore and heeled over in the River Thames at Blackwall, Middlesex. She was on a voyage from Calcutta, India to London. She was righted and refloated the next day.
Brothers	United Kingdom	The sloop was driven ashore and wrecked at Porthdinllaen, Caernarfonshire. Her crew were rescued. She was on a voyage from Liverpool to Aberdovey, Merionethshire.
Bulldog	United Kingdom	The Mersey Flat capsized and sank off Birkenhead, Cheshire. Her two crew were rescued by the tug Talbot (United Kingdom).
Celestial	United Kingdom	The full-rigged ship was driven ashore and capsized in the River Thames at the entrance to the St Katharine Docks, London. She was on a voyage from China to London. She was righted and taken in to St Katharine Docks.
Cheshire	United Kingdom	The steamboat was driven against the Prince's Landing Stage, Liverpool and was severely damaged.
Choo-Foo	United Kingdom	The ship was driven ashore at Liverpool.
Clementine	United Kingdom	The ship was driven ashore at Hayle, Cornwall. Her crew were rescued. She was on a voyage from Swansea, Glamorgan to La Rochelle, Charente-Inférieure, France.
Clemise	United Kingdom	The schooner was driven ashore on Salt Island, Anglesey. Her crew were rescued.
Colibri	France	The ship was driven against the quayside and damaged at Havre de Grâce, Seine-Inférieure.
Confiance	(United Kingdom of Great Britain and Ireland) British North America	The barque was driven ashore and wrecked at Holyhead, Anglesey. Her 23 crew were rescued by the Holyhead Lifeboat. She was on a voyage from Quebec City, Province of Canada to Liverpool.
Cornelia	United Kingdom	The ship was wrecked on the Goodwin Sands, Kent. She was on a voyage from London to Bremen.
Cosmopolitan	United Kingdom	The full-rigged ship was driven ashore in the River Thames near Blackwall.
Countess of Lonsdale	United Kingdom	The steamship was driven against the quayside and damaged at Havre de Grâce.
David	United Kingdom	The schooner ran aground on the Pactyn Shoal, in the North Sea off the coast of Northumberland. She was on a voyage from Leith, Lothian to Sunderland, County Durham. She was refloated and taken in to Berwick upon Tweed, Northumberland.
De Witt Clinton	United States	The ship was driven ashore at Formby, Lancashire. Her eight crew were rescued by the Southport and Formby Lifeboats. She was on a voyage from Boston, Massachusetts to Liverpool.
Diamond	United Kingdom	The brig was driven ashore and wrecked at Holyhead. Her crew were rescued. She was on a voyage from Belfast to Swansea. She was refloated on 29 December and towed in to Holyhead.
Driver	United Kingdom	The brig was driven ashore and wrecked at Wells-next-the-Sea, Norfolk. Her crew were rescued. She was on a voyage from Blyth, Northumberland to Boulogne, Pas-de-Calais, France. Driver was refloated on 8 December with the assistance of a tug and towed in to Wells-next-the-Sea.
Driving Mist	United Kingdom	The fishing smack foundered in the North Sea with the loss of all hands.
Elizabeth	United Kingdom	The full-rigged ship was wrecked on the Peniel Rocks, off Holyhead with the loss of four of her eleven crew. She was on a voyage from Liverpool to Halifax, Nova Scotia, British North America.
Elizabeth Morrow	United Kingdom	The barque was driven ashore at Holyhead. Her twenty crew were rescued by the Holyhead Lifeboat. She was on a voyage from the Clyde to Old Calabar, Africa.
Elizabeth and Margaret	United Kingdom	The ship was driven ashore at Porthdinllaen. Her crew survived. She was on a voyage from Havre de Grâce to Glasgow, Renfrewshire. Elizabeth and Margaret was later refloated and taken in tow for Liverpool by the tug Rattler (United Kingdom).
Emmeline	United Kingdom	The Mersey Flat was driven against the quayside and sank at Liverpool. Her crew were rescued.
Enfant de France	France	The ship was driven against the quayside and damaged at Havre de Grâce.
Enigma	United Kingdom	The yacht was driven ashore and sank in the River Wyre.
Epeney Lass	United Kingdom	The ship capsized and foundered in the Bristol Channel off Burnham-on-Sea, Somerset with the loss of one of her four crew. She was on a voyage from Cardiff, Glamorgan to Burnham-on-Sea.
Ernst	France	The ship was driven ashore in Carnarvon Bay. She was on a voyage from Nantes to Liverpool.
Essex	United Kingdom	The fishing smack foundered in the North Sea with the loss of all hands.
Eure	France	The ship was driven against the quayside and damaged at Havre de Grâce.
Fanny Truss	United Kingdom	The schooner was driven ashore at Fleetwood, Lancashire.
Fear Not	United Kingdom	The fishing boat was lost in the North Sea. Her crew were rescued.
Finistèrre	France	The ship was driven against the quayside and damaged at Havre de Grâce.
Foam	United Kingdom	The ship was driven ashore at Spurn Point, Yorkshire with loss of life.
Fortitude	United Kingdom	The fishing boat was lost in the North Sea. Her crew were rescued.
Francis	United Kingdom	The fishing boat was driven ashore on the Dutch coast with the loss of all hands.
Friar Tuck	United Kingdom	The ship was driven ashore and wrecked in the Isles of Scilly. Her crew were rescued by rocket apparatus. She was on a voyage from Foo Chow Foo, China to London.
Fusilier	United Kingdom	The full-rigged ship ran aground on the Girdler Sand, off the north Kent coast. All on board, more than 100 people, were rescued by the Ramsgate Lifebota and a tug. She was on a voyage from London to Port Phillip, Victoria. Fusilier was refloated on 11 December and towed in to London.
Gannet	United Kingdom	The pilot cutter was run down and sunk at Waterford by the steamship Beta (United Kingdom). Her crew survived.
Gabrielle	France	The schooner was wrecked at Fécamp, Seine-Inférieure with the loss of three of her six crew.
Gezina Regna	Netherlands	The schooner was wrecked on the West Hoyle Bank, in Liverpool Bay with the loss of all but one of her crew. The survivor was rescued by a lifeboat. She was on a voyage from Belfast to Mostyn, Flintshire.
Gleaner	United Kingdom	The sloop was driven ashore and wrecked at Brean, Somerset.
Gleaner	United Kingdom	The schooner was driven ashore at Ballyheigue, County Kerry. She was on a voyage from Memel, Prussia to Cardiff.
Guyon	United Kingdom	The fishing smack foundered in the North Sea with the loss of all hands.
Hariseekit	United States	The ship was driven ashore in the River Thames at Blackwall. Her jib-boom damaged the Brunswick Hotel. She was refloated.
Harmony	United Kingdom	The schooner was wrecked at Holyhead. Four of her five crew reached shore, the fifth was rescued. She was on a voyage from Ayr to Dublin and/or Drogheda, County Louth.
Harriett	United Kingdom	The schooner was driven ashore in the River Mersey. She was on a voyage from Newry, County Antrim to Runcorn, Cheshire.
Helen	United Kingdom	The ship was driven ashore at Porthdinllaen. Her crew survived. She was on a voyage from Bangor, Caernarfonshire to London.
Helen Campbell	(United Kingdom of Great Britain and Ireland) British North America	The barque was driven on to the Clippera Rocks, on the coast of Anglesey and was wrecked. Her crew were rescued by rocket apparatus. She was on a voyage from Dundalk, County Louth to Swansea.
Henry	United Kingdom	The schooner was driven ashore at Formby. Her crew were rescued. She was on a voyage from Belfast to Runcorn.
Henry and Betsey	United Kingdom	The ship was driven ashore and wrecked at Formby. She was on a voyage from Newry to Liverpool.
Hephzidah	United Kingdom	The ship was driven ashore at Porthdinllaen.
Hibernia	United Kingdom	The ship was driven ashore at Holyhead. Her crew were rescued. She was on a voyage from Workington, Cumberland to Dublin.
Indefatigable	United Kingdom	The fishing boat was lost in the North Sea.
Industrie	Belgium	The ship was abandoned off Holyhead. She was on a voyage from Liverpool to Ostend, West Flanders. She was subsequently boarded by some of the crew of the steamship Connaught (United Kingdom) and taken in to Holyhead, where she sank.
Industry	United Kingdom	The ship was driven against the quayside and sank at Fremington, Devon.
James	United Kingdom	The ship foundered in the North Sea.
Jane Brown	United Kingdom	The ship was driven ashore at Caernarfon.
Jeune François	France	The brig sank at Waterloo, Lancashire. Her crew were rescued. She was refloated on 6 November.
Johanna	United Kingdom	The ship was wrecked on the Trinity Sand, in the North Sea off the coast of Lincolnshire with the loss of five of her six crew. The survivor was rescued by the smack Secret (United Kingdom). She was on a voyage from Sunderland to Maldon, Essex.
John	United Kingdom	The brigantine ran aground on the Tully Bank, off the coast of Lancashire with the loss of all hands. She was on a voyage from Ardrossan, Ayrshire to Fleetwood.
John	United Kingdom	The brig foundered in the North Sea off the coast of Norfolk with the loss of all hands. She was on a voyage from Blyth, Northumberland to King's Lynn, Norfolk.
John and Jane	United Kingdom	The ship foundered in the North Sea 60 nautical miles (110 km) east by south of Spurn Point. Her crew were rescued by the Barking smack Alfred (United Kingdom). John and Jane was on a voyage from South Shields to Plymouth, Devon and Rochefort, Charente-Inférieure, France, or from Bremen to Newcastle upon Tyne, Northumberland.
John and William	United Kingdom	The collier departed from Blyth, Northumberland for Calais. Presumed subsequently foundered with the loss of all hands.
John Bull	United Kingdom	The ship was driven ashore at Toward Point, Argyllshire. She was on a voyage from the Clyde to Santos, Brazil. She was refloated on 8 December.
John Bunyan	United Kingdom	The ship was driven ashore and severely damaged at Liverpool. She was refloated.
John Watts	United Kingdom	The Thames barge was driven onto the Buxey Sand, in the North Sea off the coast of Essex. Her crew were rescued by the steam yacht Irene ( Trinity House). John Watts was on a voyage from London to Harwich, Essex.
Joseph	Belgium	The sloop was abandoned in the North Sea. Her six crew were rescued by a fishing smack.
Jupiter	United Kingdom	The ship was lost. Her eight crew were rescued by a lifeboat.
Lampedo	(United Kingdom of Great Britain and Ireland) British North America	The full-rigged ship ran aground in the River Mersey off Aigburth, Lancashire. Seven passengers were taken off by a lifeboat. She was on a voyage from Saint John, New Brunswick to Liverpool. She was refloated the next day and found to be severely leaky.
Laurel	United Kingdom	The sloop was driven ashore at Holme-next-the-Sea, Norfolk. She was on a voyage from Spalding, Lincolnshire to Grimsby, Lincolnshire.
Leveret	United Kingdom	The fishing smack foundered in the North Sea with the loss of all hands.
Lew Choo	United Kingdom	The full-rigged ship was driven ashore in the River Mersey. She was on a voyage from Bombay, India to Liverpool. She was refloated with the assistance of two tugs.
Liberty	United Kingdom	The ship was driven ashore and wrecked in St Brides Bay. Her crew were rescued. She was on a voyage from Portmadoc to Gloucester.
Longford	United Kingdom	The Mersey Flat was driven against the quayside and sank at Garston, Lancashire. Her crew were rescued.
Louise	France	The ship was driven ashore at La Trinité-sur-Mer, Morbihan. She was on a voyage from Sunderland to Montagne, Gironde. She was refloated on 6 December and taken in to La Trinité-sur-Mer for repairs.
Madras	United Kingdom	The ship ran aground in the River Mersey. She was on a voyage from Quebec City to Liverpool.
Margaret and Jane	United Kingdom	The schooner was abandoned off Barmouth, Merionethshire. Her five crew were rescued by the Barmouth Lifeboat.
Margaret and Jessie	United Kingdom	The ship was driven against the Nelson Pier, Liverpool. She capsized and sank.
Margaret Campbell	United Kingdom	The brig was driven ashore at Liverpool.
Mary	United Kingdom	The ship foundered off Aberdeen with the loss of all on board. She was on a voyage from Montrose, Forfarshire to Liverpool.
Mary Agnes	United Kingdom	The schooner was wrecked on the Burbo Bank, in Liverpool Bay. Her crew survived. She was on a voyage from Preston, Lancashire to Dundalk, County Louth.
Mary Jane	United Kingdom	The sloop sank off Ramsey, Isle of Man with the loss of all hands. She was on a voyage from Belfast to Whitehaven, Cumberland.
Merlin	United Kingdom	The yacht was driven ashore and sank in the River Wyre.
Miriam	United Kingdom	The fishing boat was lost in the North Sea with the loss of a crew member.
Napier	United Kingdom	The fishing boat was lost in the North Sea. Her crew were rescued.
Nelson	United Kingdom	The ship was driven ashore and wrecked at Porthdinllaen. Her crew survived. She was on a voyage from Caernarfon to Newcastle upon Tyne.
Neptune	United Kingdom	The sloop was driven ashore at Spurn Point. She was refloated on 10 December and towed in to Hull, Yorkshire.
New Gift	United Kingdom	The ship ran aground in the Menai Strait. She was on a voyage from Liverpool to Porthdinllaen.
North Star	United Kingdom	The fishing boat was lost in the North Sea. Her crew were rescued.
Osprey	United Kingdom	The fishing smack foundered in the North Sea with the loss of all hands.
Palermo	United Kingdom	The schooner was driven ashore and wrecked near Holyhead. Her crew were rescued.
Peace	United Kingdom	The sloop foundered off Great Yarmouth, Norfolk with the loss of two of her four crew. She was on a voyage from Chichester, Sussex to a Scottish port.
Pearl	United Kingdom	The schooner was wrecked near "Cerigwith", Anglesy. Her crew were rescued.
Pensacola	United Kingdom	The ship ran aground on the Burbo Bank near the Formby Lightship ( Trinity House) and was severely damaged. Fifteen of her nineteen crew were rescued by a lifeboat, the rest by a steamboat. Pensacola was on a voyage from Quebec City to Liverpool. She was later refloated.
Philip	United Kingdom	The ship was driven ashore and wrecked in St Brides Bay. Her crew survived. She was on a voyage from Nevis to Bristol, Gloucestershire.
Plover	United Kingdom	The schooner was abandoned on the Trinity Sand with the loss of a crew member. She was subsequently driven ashore at Spurn Point. She was on a voyage from the River Wear to Ipswich, Suffolk.
Providence	United Kingdom	The schooner foundered off Portrush, County Antrim with the loss of all four crew. Three would-be rescuers also perished. She was on a voyage from Troon, Ayrshire to Londonderry.
Rainbow	United Kingdom	The fishing smack foundered in the North Sea with the loss of all hands.
Ranger	United Kingdom	The fishing smack foundered in the North Sea with the loss of all hands.
Rattlesnake	United Kingdom	The fishing smack foundered in the North Sea with the loss of all hands.
Rebecca	United Kingdom	The ship was driven ashore at Porthdinllaen.
R T K	United Kingdom	The schooner was wrecked at Holyhead. Her crew were rescued. She was on a voyage from Rouen, Seine-Inférieure to Liverpool.
Sarah and Ann	United Kingdom	The ship was driven ashore and wrecked at Hunstanton, Norfolk. Her crew were rescued. She was on a voyage from King's Lynn, Norfolk to Blyth, Northumberland.
Scottish Lass	United Kingdom	The schooner was wrecked near Holyhead with the loss of a crew member. She was on a voyage from Liverpool to Dublin. She was refloated on 29 December and towed in to Holyhead.
Seven Brothers	United Kingdom	The fishing boat was lost in the North Sea. Her crew were rescued.
Sisters	United Kingdom	The schooner collided with the schooner Meg Merrilees (United Kingdom) 2 nautical miles (3.7 km) off Ramsey, Isle of Man and was abandoned by her crew, who were rescued by Meg Merrilees. Sisters was on a voyage from Ardrossan to Morecambe, Lancashire. She was presumed to have foundered.
Skylark	United Kingdom	The sloop was wrecked at Holyhead with the loss of all hands.
Speed	United Kingdom	The schooner was driven ashore at St. Mawes, Cornwall. She was on a voyage from Bristol, Gloucestershire to Jersey, Channel Islands. She was refloated.
Star	United Kingdom	The ship was driven ashore in the River Mersey.
Star	United Kingdom	The ship capsized.
Susan	United Kingdom	The schooner was driven ashore 1 nautical mile (1.9 km) north of Ramsey. She was on a voyage from Maryport, Cumberland to Dublin.
Swansea Packet	United Kingdom	The ship foundered in the Bristol Channel off Burnham-on-Sea with the loss of all four crew.
Sybil	United Kingdom	The brigantine was driven ashore at Burnham-on-Sea. She was refloated on 6 December.
Teaser	United Kingdom	The yacht was driven ashore and sank in the River Wyre.
Temperance Star	United Kingdom	The fishing smack foundered in the North Sea with the loss of all hands.
Three Sisters	United Kingdom	The fishing smack foundered in the North Sea with the loss of all hands.
Three Susans	United Kingdom	The ship was driven ashore at Porthdinllaen. She was on a voyage from Bangor, Caernarfonshire to Runcorn.
Tom	United Kingdom	The Mersey Flat was driven against the quayside and sank at Liverpool. Her crew were rescued.
Twilight	United Kingdom	The fishing boat was lost in the North Sea. Her crew were rescued.
Usio	Russia	The brig was abandoned in the North Sea. Her nine crew were rescued by a fishing smack.
Virago	United Kingdom	The brig was driven ashore and wrecked near Formby. Her crew survived. She was on a voyage from Glasgow to Liverpool.
Volunteer	United Kingdom	The fishing smack foundered in the North Sea with the loss of all hands.
Walter	United Kingdom	The Mersey Flat sank off Garston. Her three crew were rescued.
Wedding Ring	United Kingdom	The steamboat ran aground in the River Thames between Waterloo Bridge and Westminster Bridge. Her passengers were taken off.
Westbourne	United Kingdom	The brig collided with a barque and sank off Holyhead with the loss of all ten crew. She was on a voyage from Liverpool to Belize City, British Honduras.
Weston	United Kingdom	The ship ran aground in the River Mersey. She was on a voyage rom Akyab, Burma to Liverpool. She was refloated with assistance from the tugs Hercules, Speedwell and another (all United Kingdom) and taken in to Birkenhead.
Wagner	United Kingdom	The Mersey flat sank in the Salisbury Dock, Liverpool. All eight people on board were rescued.
Wilhelmsburg	Hamburg	The steamship was wrecked off Terschelling with the loss of 356 of the 400 people on board. She was on a voyage from Hamburg to Australia.
Winchester	United Kingdom	The Mersey Flat was driven against the quayside and sank at Liverpool. Her crew were rescued.
Winford	United Kingdom	The Mersey Flat was driven against the quayside and sank at Liverpool. Her crew were rescued.
Unnamed	Flag unknown	The brig was wrecked on Scroby Sands, Norfolk with the loss of all hands.
Unnamed	Flag unknown	The schooner was driven ashore and wrecked in the Hilbre Islands, Cheshire. Her crew were rescued by the Hoylake Lifeboat.
Two unnamed vessels	United Kingdom	The Mersey Flats were driven on to the Pluckington Bank, off the coast of Lancashire.
Unnamed	Flag unknown	The full-rigged ship was driven ashore at Liverpool.
Unnamed	United Kingdom	The Mersey Flat sank at Seacombe, Cheshire.
Unnamed	France	The schooner foundered off the coast of Cornwall, United Kingdom with the loss of all hands.
Two unnamed vessels	United Kingdom	The smacks were driven ashore at "Portmelvin". Their crews survived.
Unnamed	United Kingdom	The steamboat ran aground in the River Thames between Waterloo Bridge and Westminster Bridge. Her passengers were taken off.
Unnamed	United Kingdom	A number of steamboats ran aground in the River Thames between London Bridge and Lambeth, Surrey.
Unnamed	United Kingdom	Three barges sank in the River Thames at Greenwich, Kent.
Unnamed	United Kingdom	The brig sank in the River Thames at Woolwich, Kent.
Unnamed	United Kingdom	The schooner was driven against the quayside and sank in the Canada Dock, Liverpool.
Unnamed	United Kingdom	The schooner was driven ashore near Rhyl, Denbighshire.
Ten unnamed vessels	United Kingdom	The Mersey Flats, two belonging to Mr Evans, two belonging to Mr Wilkinson, and six others, sank in the River Mersey.
Two unnamed vessels	United Kingdom	The Mersey Flats sank in the Salisbury Dock, Liverpool.
Two unnamed vessels	Flags unknown	A barque and a schooner were driven ashore 4 nautical miles (7.4 km) south west of Southport, Lancashire.
Two unnamed vessels	Flags unknown	The schooners were driven ashore on the Peniel Sands, Anglesey. Their crews were rescued.
Two unnamed vessels	United Kingdom	The fishing boats were driven ashore and wrecked at Tenby, Pembrokeshire. The crew of one were rescued by the Tenby Lifeboat and those of the other were rescued by the smack Emma (United Kingdom).
Unnamed	Norway	The ship was driven ashore and wrecked at Havre de Grâce.
Unnamed	Flag unknown	The ship foundered off Howth, County Dublin.

== 4 December ==
List of shipwrecks: 4 December 1863
Ship	State	Description
Allen	United Kingdom	The ship was abandoned off Cromer, Norfolk. Her crew were rescued. She was on a voyage from South Shields, County Durham to London.
Almira	United Kingdom	The ship was driven ashore near Newborough, Anglesey. Her crew survived.
Anne	United Kingdom	The ship was driven ashore at Porthdinllaen, Caernarfonshire.
Balmerino	United Kingdom	The steamboat sank at Crail, Fife.
Carry	United Kingdom	The ship was driven ashore and wrecked at Wells-next-the-Sea, Norfolk. she was refloated on 9 December and taken in to Wells-next-the-Sea.
Castries	United Kingdom	The full-rigged ship put in to Falmouth, Cornwall in a severely damaged condition. She was on a voyage from Liverpool, Lancashire to Barbados.
Charles Northcote	United Kingdom	The ship ran aground on the Trinity Sand, in the North Sea off the coast of Lincolnshire and sank. She was on a voyage from North Shields, Northumberland to Genoa, Italy.
Clifton	United Kingdom	The ship foundered in the North Sea off Den Helder, North Holland, Netherlands with the loss of all 35 people on board. She was on a voyage from Sunderland, County Durham to Madras, India.
Columbus	Norway	The brig was driven ashore and wrecked on Terschelling, Friesland, Netherlands. Her crew were rescued. She was on a voyage from Newcastle upon Tyne, Northumberland to Alexandria, Egypt.
Comlice	France	The ship was wrecked on the Goodwin Sands, Kent, United Kingdom. Her five crew were rescued. She was on a voyage from Bremen to Rouen, Seine-Inférieure.
David	United Kingdom	The schooner was abandoned at Lindisfarne, Northumberland. She was on a voyage from Leith, Lothian to Sunderland.
David White	United Kingdom	The ship was wrecked at Formby, Lancashire. Her crew were rescued. She was on a voyage from Boston, Massachusetts, United States to Liverpool, Lancashire.
Diana	United Kingdom	The ship ran aground on the Hinder Bank, in the North Sea off the coast of Zeeland, Netherlands and was wrecked. Her crew were rescued. She was on a voyage from Grimsby, Lincolnshire to Haiti.
Douglas	United Kingdom	The barque was abandoned in the North Sea. Her crew were rescued by some smacks. Douglas was on a voyage from Sunderland to Bordeaux, Gironde, France. She was subsequently taken in tow by the steamship Lord Cardigan (United Kingdom).
Dublin	United Kingdom	The brig was wrecked at Fishguard, Pembrokeshire. Her crew were rescued. she was on a voyage from Dublin to Cardiff.
Duke of Northumberland	United Kingdom	The barque was driven ashore and wrecked at Swansea, Glamorgan. Her eighteen crew were rescued by the Swansea Lifeboat. She was on a voyage from a port in Cuba to Swansea. Duke of Northumberland was later refloated. She was towed in to Grimsby on 22 December.
Eleanora	France	The ship sank in the Crosby Channel. Her crew were rescued by a gig. She was on a voyage from Nantes, Loire-Inférieure to Liverpool.
Esperance	France	The schooner was lost near Cerigwith, Anglesey, United Kingdom with the loss of all but two of her crew. Survivors were rescued by the Holyhead Lifeboat. She was on a voyage from Liverpool to Nantes.
Eugenie	United Kingdom	The ship collided with an Austrian barque and was run onto the Trinity Sand, where she sank with the loss of three of her six crew. Survivors were rescued by the smack Joseph and Mary (United Kingdom). Eugenie was on a voyage from South Shields.
Fortitude	United Kingdom	The fishing smack was abandoned in the North Sea with the loss of a crew member. Survivors were rescued by the fishing smack Catherine (United Kingdom), which lost two of her crew effecting the rescue.
Friends	United Kingdom	The schooner was driven ashore and wrecked at the mouth of the River Mersey.
George	United Kingdom	The schooner sank off the Point of Ayr, Cheshire. Her crew were rescued.
George	United Kingdom	The ship was abandoned in the North Sea with the loss of four of her crew. Survivors were rescued by Alert (United Kingdom). George was on a voyage from Kronstadt, Russia to Hull, Yorkshire. She was subsequently taken in to Gothenburg, Sweden.
Ina	United Kingdom	The barque was driven ashore and wrecked at Happisburgh, Norfolk with the loss of one of her fifteen crew. Survivors were rescued by the Happisburgh Lifeboat. She was on a voyage from South Shields to Cartagena, Spain.
Isabella and Catherine	United Kingdom	The schooner was wrecked at the mouth of the River Mersey with the loss of one of her four crew. She was on a voyage from Westport, County Mayo to Liverpool.
Jerome	United Kingdom	The derelict schooner was driven ashore near Crosby, Lancashire.
Maria	United Kingdom	The schooner was driven ashore on Ynys Llanddwyn, Anglesey. Her four crew were rescued by the Caernarfon Lifeboat. She was on a voyage from London to Amlwch, Anglesey.
Mary	United Kingdom	The schooner foundered in Liverpool Bay with the loss of all on board, including three pilots. She was on a voyage from Sligo to Liverpool. She came ashore at Leasowe, Cheshire on 8 December.
Orion	United Kingdom	The barque was abandoned in the North Sea. She was on a voyage from Gävle, Sweden to Hartlepool, County Durham. She was subsequently driven ashore near Hirtshals, Denmark.
Orlanda	United Kingdom	The collier, a barque, foundered in the North Sea. Her ten crew were rescued by the smack Secret (United Kingdom). She was on a voyage from the River Tyne to London.
Richard	United Kingdom	The ship ran aground on the Trinity Sand and sank. Her crew were rescued. She was on a voyage from Sunderland to Aldeburgh, Suffolk.
Rival	United Kingdom	The smack was abandoned in the North Sea off the Dutch coast. Her five crew were rescued by the smack Standard (United Kingdom).
Robert	France	The brig was lost off the Île de Seine, Finistère.
Scipio	United Kingdom	The brig was abandoned in the North Sea 25 nautical miles (46 km) off Lowestoft, Suffolk. Her crew were rescued by the brig Humphreys (United Kingdom). Scipio was on a voyage from the River Tyne to London.
Solon	Sweden	The ship was abandoned in the North Sea with the loss of two of her crew. She was on a voyage from Gävle to Hull.
Speculant	United Kingdom	The ship was abandoned in the North Sea off Texel, North Holland, Netherlands. Her crew were rescued by the smack Fox (United Kingdom). Speculant was on a voyage from Newcastle upon Tyne to Lisbon, Portugal. She came ashore near "Tolstrup", Denmark on 22 December and was wrecked.
St. Catherine	United Kingdom	The schooner was driven ashore near Holyhead. Her crew were rescued. She was refloated on 13 December and towed in to Holyhead.
Test	United Kingdom	The smack was run down and sunk in the North Sea by the steamship Lord Cardigan (United Kingdom) Her crew were rescued by the smack Standard and a Barking smack (both United Kingdom).
Thomas Kennion	United Kingdom	The collier, a brig, was abandoned in the Dogger Bank. Her crew were rescued by a smack. She was on a voyage from Kronstadt to London. She was taken in to the Nieuw Diep on 11 December.
Union	Russia	The ship was abandoned in the North Sea. Her crew were rescued. She was on a voyage from Ventspils to Lowestoft, Suffolk.
Victoria	Kingdom of Hanover	The brig was abandoned in the North Sea. Her crew were rescued by Elizabeth and Hannah (United Kingdom). Victoria was on a voyage from Sweden to London. She subsequently came ashore at Ringkøbing, Denmark.
Volunteer	United Kingdom	The paddle tug foundered in the North Sea. Her crew were rescued by a fishing lugger.
Unnamed	Flag unknown	The brig was driven ashore at Étaples, Pas-de-Calais, France.
Unnamed	Flag unknown	The brigantine was driven ashore at Maltreath, Anglesey.

== 5 December ==
List of shipwrecks: 5 December 1863
Ship	State	Description
Bellairs	United Kingdom	The barque was abandoned off the Dudgeon Sand, in the North Sea. Her seventeen crew were rescued by the schooner Isabella (United Kingdom). She was set afire and sank north east of the Leman and Ower Sand. Bellairs was on a voyage from Alexandria, Egypt to Hull, Yorkshire.
Canterbury	United Kingdom	The ship ran aground at Lowestoft, Suffolk. She was on a voyage from Sunderland, County Durham to Alexandria, Egypt.
Eugenia	United Kingdom	The ship ran aground in the Hooghly River. She was on a voyage from Liverpool, Lancashire to Calcutta, India.
Grosbrook	United Kingdom	The barque was driven ashore on Ameland, Friesland, Netherlands. She was on a voyage from Hamburg to London.
Hammond	United Kingdom	The brig was wrecked on St. Mary's Isle, Douglas, Isle of Man. She was on a voyage from Belfast to Maryport, Cumberland.
Levant	Norway	The barque was wrecked at Spurn Point, Yorkshire. She was on a voyage from Hull to Fredrikshald. Levant was refloated on 27 December and taken in to Grimsby, Lincolnshire.
Lucy and Ann	United Kingdom	The ship was driven ashore in the Larne Lough. She was refloated on 8 December.
Lunna	United Kingdom	The brig was abandoned off the Outer Dowsing Sandbank, in the North Sea. Her crew survived. She was on a voyage from Sunderland, County Durham to London.
Odense	Denmark	The ship was abandoned in the North Sea. Her crew were rescued by Marie (United Kingdom). Odense was on a voyage from Odense to London.
Prince Rupert	United Kingdom	The ship was driven ashore at St. Anthony's Lighthouse, Cornwall. She was on a voyage from London to Jamaica. She was refloated with assistance.
Princess of Wales	United Kingdom	The schooner was driven on to the Lapsand, in the Baltic Sea off the coast of Denmark.
Radical	United Kingdom	The ship was abandoned at sea. Her crew were rescued by Max and Emil (Flah unknown). Radical was on a voyage from Danzig to Sunderland.
Souvenir	France	The ship was driven ashore east of Gravelines, Nord. She was on a voyage from Gravelines to London and/or Newcastle upon Tyne.
Telegraph	United Kingdom	The schooner foundered in the North Sea (56°49′N 5°31′E). Her crew were rescued by the brig Umeå (Sweden).

== 6 December ==
List of shipwrecks: 6 December 1863
Ship	State	Description
August	United Kingdom	The brig was driven ashore at Margate, Kent.
Bessies	United Kingdom	The ship ran aground on the Brake Sand, in the North Sea off the coast of Norfolk. She was refloated and assisted in to Great Yarmouth, Norfolk.
Ceres	United Kingdom	American Civil War, Union blockade: The blockade runner, a steamer, was discovered aground and afire at the mouth of the Cape Fear River on the coast of North Carolina, Confederate States of America by the screw steamers USS Aries and USS Violet (both United States Navy). She floated free during the night of 6–7 December, the flames were extinguished, and she was captured by Violet.
Christine	Denmark	The schooner sank in the North Sea. Her crew were rescued by Hope (United Kingdom). Christine was on a voyage from Horsens to Bristol, Gloucestershire, United Kingdom.
Emanuel	Norway	The ship was driven ashore and wrecked on Terschelling, Friesland, Netherlands. She was on a voyage from Øster-Risør to London, United Kingdom.
Express	United Kingdom	The clipper was destroyed by fire at Calcutta, India.
Fanny McBurney, or Fanny McBurnie	United States	The 207-ton sternwheel paddle steamer was stranded on Island No. 34 in the Mississippi River.
Finke	United Kingdom	The ship was wrecked on the Niding Rock, in the Baltic Sea. her crew were rescued. She was on a voyage from Riga, Russia to Londonderry.
Flora McDonald	United Kingdom	The ship was driven ashore and wrecked at Elie, Fife. Her crew were rescued. She was on a voyage from Kirkcaldy, Fife to Montrose, Forfarshire.
Isaac Newton	United States	The Isaac Newton as rebuilt 1855 Burning of the Isaac Newton The 1,332-ton sternwheel paddle steamer exploded on the Hudson River off Fort Washington, New York, killing nine people.
Karen Elizabeth	Norway	The barque foundered in the Bay of Biscay (45°05′N 13°35′W). All eleven people on board were rescued by the brig North Pole (United Kingdom). Karen Elizabeth was on a voyage from Cardiff to Saint Thomas, Virgin Islands.
Kelloe	United Kingdom	The ship was abandoned in the North Sea. Her crew were rescued by the brig Maria (Sweden). She was on a voyage from Danzig to London. Kelloe came ashore on Rømø, Denmark on 15 December and was wrecked.
Lady Gordon	United Kingdom	The ship ran aground on the North Bank, in the Irish Sea off the coast of County Dublin. She was refloated on 11 December and taken in to Dublin.
Mendschap	Netherlands	The ship was abandoned in the North Sea. Her crew were rescued by the brig Maria (Sweden). Mendschap was on a voyage from Danzig to Groningen.
Providence	United Kingdom	The ship was abandoned in the North Sea. Her crew were rescued by Dorette (Russia). Provindence was on a voyage from Stettin to Leith, Lothian.
St. Leonards	United Kingdom	The ship was destroyed by fire at Calcutta.
USS Weehawken	United States Navy	Illustrations depicting the sinking of USS Weehawken.American Civil War: The monitor foundered at anchor in Charleston Harbor off Morris Island, South Carolina, Confederate States of America (32°42′57″N 79°53′25″W) during a gale with the loss of 31 lives.
Zion	United Kingdom	The schooner foundered in the North Sea 30 nautical miles (56 km) off Spurn Point, Yorkshire. Her four crew were rescued by the smack Neva (United Kingdom). Zion was on a voyage from London to the Clyde.

== 7 December ==
List of shipwrecks: 7 December 1863
Ship	State	Description
Alert	United Kingdom	The ship was driven ashore at Bowmore, Islay, Inner Hebrides.
Blonde	United Kingdom	The barque was abandoned on the Dogger Bank with the loss of a crew member. Survivors were rescued by the smacks Coquet Water and Prince of Wales (United Kingdom).
Delphine	Denmark	The brig was driven ashore on Vlieland, Friesland, Netherlands with the loss of two of her crew. She was on a voyage from South Shields, County Durham, United Kingdom to Cádiz, Spain.
Diana	Duchy of Holstein	The steamship ran aground at Eckernförde.
Elizabeth	United Kingdom	The schooner was driven ashore at Hartlepool, County Durham. Her four crew were rescued by the Hartlepool Lifeboat. She was on a voyage from Seaham, County Durham to Faversham, Kent.
Eliza Jane	United Kingdom	The barque was abandoned in the North Sea. Her crew survived. She was on a voyage from Danzig to London.
Fairy Queen	United Kingdom	The ship ran aground on the Collot Bank, in the Scheldt. She was on a voyage from Antwerp, Belgium to Hartlepool, County Durham. She floated off and came ashore at the Rammekens Castle, Vlissingen, Zeeland, Netherlands.
Frederick Franz	Grand Duchy of Mecklenburg-Schwerin	The barque was lost in the Dogger Bank with the loss of one of her thirteen crew. Survivors were rescued by the fishing smack Uncle Tom (United Kingdom). Frederick Francz was on a voyage from a port in Mecklenburg-Schwerin to London.
Haides	United Kingdom	The ship ran aground off Fleetwood, Lancashire. She was refloated and towed in to Fleetwood.
John Thomas	United Kingdom	The ship was lost in the Dogger Bank. Five crew survived. She was on a voyage from Bremen to Newcastle upon Tyne, Northumberland.
Lewis	United Kingdom	The smack was abandoned off Irvine, Ayrshire. Her three crew were rescued by the Irvine Lifeboat.
Ranger	United Kingdom	The smack was run ashore north of Brora. Sutherland. She was on a voyage from Inverness to Fearn, Ross-shire.
Sea Walker	United Kingdom	The brig was abandoned in the North Sea 80 nautical miles (150 km) east of the Isle of May, Fife. Her crew were rescued by the steamship Ossian (United Kingdom). Sea Walker was on a voyage from Danzig to Leith, Lothian.
Unnamed	Norway	The ship was destroyed by fire in the North Sea. Her crew were rescued by a British ship.

== 8 December ==
List of shipwrecks: 8 December 1863
Ship	State	Description
Abbots Reading	United Kingdom	The ship collided with an Italian barque and was then run into by a schooner. She was on a voyage from Liverpool, Lancashire to Valparaíso, Chile. She put in to Holyhead, Anglesey, where she ran aground and heeled over. She was later righted, and put back to Liverpool, where she arrived on 23 December.
Antoinette	United Kingdom	American Civil War, Union blockade: Attempting to run the Union blockade and reach Fernandina, Florida, Confederate States of America, the schooner was forced aground on Cumberland Island on the coast of Georgia by the barque USS Braziliera (United States Navy).
Cleopatra and Ceres	United Kingdom	The ship was driven ashore near Cardiff, Glamorgan.
Eldon	United Kingdom	The barque was abandoned on St. Peter's Bank. She was on a voyage from Quebec City, Province of Canada, British North America to Gloucester.
Ellen Kerr	United Kingdom	The ship was driven ashore on Lindisfarne, Northumberland. She was on a voyage from Inverness to the River Tyne. She was refloated.
Great Britain	United Kingdom	The steamship was reported to have been wrecked on Santiago, Cape Verde Islands. All on board were rescued. She was on a voyage from London to Nelson, New Zealand.
Hooghly	United Kingdom	The barque foundered in the Mediterranean Sea. Her crew were rescued. She was on a voyage from Sulina, Ottoman Empire to Falmouth, Cornwall.
Jarlsø	Norway	The ship was driven ashore on Texel, North Holland, Netherlands. Her crew were rescued. She was on a voyage from Bilbao, Spain to Tønsberg.
Lorina	(United Kingdom of Great Britain and Ireland)	The ship was driven ashore and wrecked on the Isle of Mull, Inner Hebrides. She was on a voyage from Quebec City to the Clyde.
Ocean Child	Hamburg	The barque collided with the barque Sattara (United Kingdom) and was abandoned. Her thirteen crew were rescued by Sattara and the barque Due Fratelli (Italy). Ocean Child was on a voyage from Liverpool to Havana, Cuba.
Polynesia	United Kingdom	The ship was abandoned in the Atlantic Ocean. Her crew were rescued by Adelaide (United Kingdom). Polynesia was on a voyage from Quebec City, Province of Canada, British North America to Fleetwood, Lancashire.
Rose	United Kingdom	The schooner departed from Sunderland, County Durham for Dingwall, Ross-shire. No further trace, presumed foundered with the loss of all hands.
Sir William Pulteney	United Kingdom	The brig was driven ashore at Lindisfarne. She was on a voyage from Danzig to Granton, Lothian. She was refloated.
Sovereign	United Kingdom	The ship was abandoned in the North Sea 40 nautical miles (74 km) south south east of the Buchan Ness Lighthouse, Aberdeenshire. Her six crew were rescued by Thomas (United Kingdom). Sovereign was on a voyage from Sunderland, County Durham to Dundee, Forfarshire.
Volunteer	United Kingdom	The ship was wrecked on the Cardugos Shoals. Her crew survived. She was on a voyage from Mauritius to Calcutta, India.
No. 1	(United Kingdom of Great Britain and Ireland) Jersey	The ship was abandoned in the North Sea. Her crew were rescued by the brig Philis (United Kingdom). No. 1 was on a voyage from Hartlepool to Jersey.
Unnamed	Flag unknown	The schooner foundered in the North Sea 14 nautical miles (26 km) south east of Flamborough Head, Yorkshire, United Kingdom with the loss of all hands.

== 9 December ==
List of shipwrecks: 9 December 1863
Ship	State	Description
Mary	United Kingdom	The ship was wrecked near Havana, Cuba. She was on a voyage from Saint John, New Brunswick, British North America to Havana.
Mary and Elizabeth	United Kingdom	The fishing boat collided with the steamship Calpe (United Kingdom) and sank at New Brighton, Cheshire.
Mayflower	United Kingdom	The ship was abandoned at in the Atlantic Ocean. Her crew were rescued by the schooner Cyclops (Netherlands). Mayflower was on a voyage from Newport, Monmouthshire to Bilbao, Spain.
Telegram	Wismar	The barque was abandoned in the North Sea. She was on a voyage from Gotland, Sweden to Newcastle upon Tyne, Northumberland, United Kingdom. She subsequently came ashore at Sheringham, Norfolk, United Kingdom. She was refloated on 13 December.
Titia Susannah	Netherlands	The ship was abandoned in the North Sea. Her crew were rescued.

== 10 December ==
List of shipwrecks: 10 December 1863
Ship	State	Description
Caledonia	United Kingdom	The ship ran aground and sank at Lytham St. Annes, Lancashire and was abandoned by her crew. She was refloated and taken in to Preston, Lancashire.
Cecilie	United Kingdom	The ship was wrecked on the Wexøe Sand, off the coast of Denmark and was abandoned by her crew. She was on a voyage from Pori, Grand Duchy of Finland to London.
Coq Barrola	United Kingdom	The ship was driven ashore and wrecked at "Chinchal Dongpo", China. Her crew were rescued.
Fame	United Kingdom	The ship was driven ashore at Lytham St. Annes. She was on a voyage from Dublin to Maryport, Cumberland. She was refloated the next day and taken in to Lytham St. Annes.
Gretha	Hamburg	The ship was abandoned in the North Sea. She was on a voyage from Elburg, Gelderland, Netherlands to Hull, Yorkshire, United Kingdom.
Hooghly	United Kingdom	The barque foundered in the Mediterranean Sea off Algiers, French Algerian. Her crew were rescued by the steamer Ida (United Kingdom).
Josephine Truxillo	United States	American Civil War: The schooner was burned by Confederate States Army troops on Bayou Lacomb in Louisiana, Confederate States of America.
Larne	United Kingdom	The barque was wrecked near Dunnet Head, Caithness. Her seventeen crew were rescued. She was on a voyage from Quebec City, Province of Canada, British North America to Leith, Lothian.
Lintin	United Kingdom	The ship was wrecked at Chapagua, British Honduras. Her crew were rerscued.
Mary	United Kingdom	The Yorkshire Billyboy struck the wreck of James Dixon (United Kingdom) and sank in the River Tyne. She was on a voyage from London to the River Tyne.
Olympia	United Kingdom	The ship was wrecked in Loch Indaal. Her crew were rescued. She was on a voyage from Liverpool, Lancashire to Galle, Ceylon. She had broken up by 21 December.
Rangoon	United Kingdom	The steamship ran aground in the Red Sea. Her passengers were taken off. She was on a voyage from Calcutta, India to Aden. She had been refloated by 25 December and taken in to Aden.
Regina	United Kingdom	The steamship was driven ashore near Dungenes, Kent. She was on a voyage from the Mediterranean to London. She was refloated on 11 January 1864 and resumed her voyage.
Richard and Sarah	United Kingdom	The sloop sank in the English Channel 6 nautical miles (11 km) off Dartmouth, Devon. Her crew were rescued. She was on a voyage from Plymouth to Exeter.
Stephany, or Stepheny	United States	American Civil War: The barge was burned by Confederate States Army troops on Bayou Lacomb.
Troy	United Kingdom	The ship was driven ashore and wrecked at Ningpo, China.
Unknown	Unknown	American Civil War:The Schooner was destroyed by Union forces at Bear Creek, Florida.
Wopke	Kingdom of Hanover	The schooner was abandoned in the Dogger Bank. She was on a voyage from Gothenburg, Sweden to London.

== 11 December ==
List of shipwrecks: 11 December 1863
Ship	State	Description
Concord	United Kingdom	The ship was wrecked on the Kentish Knock. Her crew got aboard the Kentish Knock Lightship ( Trinity House). Concord was on a voyage from London to Newcastle upon Tyne, Northumberland. She was subsequently taken in to Ramsgate, Kent by four smacks, including Persian (United Kingdom).
Fullerton	United Kingdom	The ship ran aground on the Gwinges and was severely damaged. She was on a voyage from Newcastle upon Tyne to Lisbon and/or Porto, Portugal. She was refloated and put in to Fowey, Cornwall.
General Beauregard	Confederate States of America	American Civil War: Bound for England with a cargo of cotton, turpentine, and possibly gold, the 824-ton screw steamer ran aground at Carolina Beach, North Carolina and was burned by the Confederate to prevent her capture by Union forces.
Helena	United States	American Civil War: The 33-ton barge was burned by Confederate States Army troops on Bayou Bonfouca in Louisiana, Confederate States of America.
Hope and Peggy	United Kingdom	The ship was run ashore near "Klentcham".
Richard	Stettin	The ship was driven ashore on Saltholm, Denmark. She was on a voyage from Sunderland, County Durham, United Kingdom to Stettin. She had been refloated by 14 December and subsequently resumed her voyage.
Sarah Bladen	United States	American Civil War: The 43-ton schooner was burned by Confederate States Army troops on Bayou Bonfouca.
Phœnix	United Kingdom	The ship struck the wreck of Karlo (Flag unknown) and sank off the Goodwin Sands, Kent. Her crew took to two boats. Those in one of the boats were rescued by a ship, the others got on board the Gull Lightship ( Trinity House). They were taken off by the smack Aurora's Increase (United Kingdom). Phœnix was on a voyage from Sunderland to San Francisco, California.
Transit	United Kingdom	The brig struck the Cannon Rock, in the Firth of Clyde. She sank the next day off "Barr Isle". Her crew were rescued. She was on a voyage from Ardrossan, Ayrshire to Cork.

== 12 December ==
List of shipwrecks: 12 December 1863
Ship	State	Description
Alice Provost	United States	The 476-ton barque was wrecked while trying to enter port at Port Royal, South Carolina, Confederate States of America. The receiving ship USS Vermont (United States Navy) rescued her crew.
Anna	United Kingdom	The ship sprang a leak and was beached at "Karringan", Sweden. She was on a voyage from Pillau, Prussia to Aberdeen.
Belize	United Kingdom	The ship was wrecked on Ameland, Friesland, Netherlands. All on board survived. She was on a voyage from Riga, Russian Empire to London.
Christian August	Norway	The brig was driven ashore and wrecked on Flotta, Orkney Islands, United Kingdom. She was on a voyage from Nyland, Sweden to Liverpool, Lancashire, United Kingdom.
Friendschaft	Norway	The brig was driven ashore in Kirk Bay, Flotta. She was on a voyage from Norway to Glasson Dock, Lancashire.
Graces	United Kingdom	The barque was abandoned off Thurso, Caithness. Her fifteen crew were taken off by the Thurso Lifeboat. She was on a voyage from Belfast, County Antrim to South Shields, County Durham.
Hilja	United Kingdom	The ship was wrecked in Galdings Bay, Bahamas. She was on a voyage from Liverpool, Lancashire to Bermuda and Nassau, Bahamas.
Lively	United Kingdom	The schooner struck a sunken wreck and foundered off Blakeney, Norfolk. Her crew were rescued by the schooner Daphne (United Kingdom). Lively was on a voyage from South Shields, County Durham to Dartmouth, Devon.
Stephen Watson	United Kingdom	The brig was wrecked on the Gunfleet Sand, in the North Sea off the coast of Essex. Her crew were rescued. She was on a voyage from Sunderland, County Durham to London.
Tetje	Sweden	The ship sprang a leak and was beached at "Osterkelt". She was on a voyage from Halmstad to Ipswich, Suffolk, United Kingdom.

== 13 December ==
List of shipwrecks: 13 December 1863
Ship	State	Description
Gotthielf	Stralsund	The ship was driven ashore near Christiansund, Norway. She was on a voyage from Stralsund to Dublin. She had become a wreck by 18 December
Regina	United Kingdom	The steamship was driven ashore between Dungeness, Kent and Rye, Sussex. Her 24 crew survived. Regina was on a voyage from Naples, Italy to Gibraltar and London. She was refloated on 4 January 1864 and taken in to London.
Royal Thistle	United Kingdom	The ship was wrecked on the Goodwin Sands, Kent. Eight of her ten crew were rescued by the lugger Wanderer (United Kingdom), the others by the Ramsgate Lifeboat. Royal Thistle was on a voyage from South Shields, County Durham to Santander, Spain.
Wanderer	United Kingdom	The ship was wrecked in Machias Bay. Her crew were rescued. She was on a voyage from Saint John, New Brunswick, British North America to Liverpool, Lancashire.

== 14 December ==
List of shipwrecks: 14 December 1863
Ship	State	Description
Eastern Light	United States	The ship was wrecked on the Carcos.
Ernestine	Stettin	The brig was driven ashore at the entrance to the Agger Canal, Denmark. Her crew were rescued by the barque Crane (United Kingdom.
Nautilus	United Kingdom	The ship ran aground on the Goodwin Sands, Kent. She was on a voyage from South Shields, County Durham to Ferrol, Spain. She was refloated with assistance.
S. L. Tilley	(United Kingdom of Great Britain and Ireland) British North America	The ship was driven ashore at Georgetown. She was refloated the next day.

== 15 December ==
List of shipwrecks: 15 December 1863
Ship	State	Description
Acorn	United Kingdom	The schooner ran into the pier, was holed by her anchor and sank at Alloa, Clackmannanshire. She was on a voyage from Leith, Lothian to "Cambria".
Alma Carr	Rostock	The barque ran aground at North Shields, Northumberland, United Kingdom.
Amazon	United Kingdom	The ship was wrecked about 8 nautical miles (15 km) east of Cape Paterson, Victoria, Australia during heavy gales on a voyage from Melbourne to Mauritius. The crew reached shore safely.
Ariel	Norway	The ship was driven ashore at "Rotbal", Denmark. She was on a voyage from Sundsvall, Sweden to Jersey, Channel Islands.
Aurora	Grand Duchy of Oldenburg	The schooner was wrecked on Sylt, Duchy of Holstein. She was on a voyage from Middlesbrough, Yorkshire, United Kingdom to Hamburg.
Christina Wobbegina	Netherlands	The tjalk foundered off Texel, North Holland. Her crew were rescued. She was on a voyage from Hartlepool, County Durham, United Kingdom to "Heppens".
Fides	United Kingdom	The schooner was wrecked on the Alfenegues Reef, off the coast of Puerto Rico. Her crew were rescued. She was on a voyage from Halifax, Nova Scotia, British North America to Ponce, Puerto Rico.
Florence Nightingale	United Kingdom	The ship struck a sunken wreck at Lima, Peru and was holed.
Honda	United Kingdom	The ship was driven ashore and sank near Trelleborg, Sweden. She was on a voyage from Kronstadt, Russia to London.
Kustine	Flag unknown	The schooner abandoned in the North Sea. She was subsequently driven ashore on Rømø, Denmark.
Pomeranian	Flag unknown	The ship was abandoned in the North Sea. She was subsequently driven ashore on Rømø.
Spray	United Kingdom	The schooner was destroyed by fire at Great Yarmouth, Norfolk.

== 16 December ==
List of shipwrecks: 16 December 1863
Ship	State	Description
Camel, or Campbell	United Kingdom	The ship struck the pier and sank at Whitehaven, Cumberland. She was on a voyage from Workington, Cumberland to Bangor.
Christian	United Kingdom	The schooner was driven ashore 2 nautical miles (3.7 km) north of Ayr. She was on a voyage from Sligo to Troon, Ayrshire.
Eleanor	United Kingdom	The sloop was driven ashore at Chisel Head, Somerset.
Fame	United Kingdom	The schooner was driven ashore at Chisel Head. She was on a voyage from Bridgwater to Swansea, Glamorgan.
Lorena	(United Kingdom of Great Britain and Ireland) British North America	The barque was driven ashore on the Isle of Mull, Inner Hebrides. She was on a voyage from Quebec City, Province of Canada to the Clyde. She was refloated on 8 October 1864 and subsequently towed to Ardrossan, Ayrshire.
Lydia Cumming	United Kingdom	The smack was run ashore at Lamlash, Isle of Arran. Her crew were rescued. She was on a voyage from Ayr to Ballantine.
Madryn	United Kingdom	The schooner was driven ashore at Larne, County Antrim. She was on a voyage from Bangor, Caernarfonshire to Londonderry. She was refloated the next day but was so leaky that she had to be beached.
Meg Merilies	United Kingdom	The ship ran aground on the Old Harry Ledge, in the English Channel. She was on a voyage from Middlesbrough, Yorkshire to Newport, Monmouthshire. She was refloated and taken in to Poole, Dorset.
Ringmahon Castle	United Kingdom	The ship was wrecked near Fécamp, Seine-Inférieure, France with the loss of four of her six crew.
Warbleton	(United Kingdom of Great Britain and Ireland) British North America	The ship driven ashore near Crosby, Lancashire. Her crew were rescued. She was on a voyage from Liverpool, Lancashire to Prince Edward Island. Warbleton was refloated on 13 January 1864 and taken in to Liverpool.

== 17 December ==
List of shipwrecks: 17 December 1863
Ship	State	Description
Asia	United Kingdom	The brig was driven ashore at Clee Ness, Lincolnshire. She was refloated and taken in to Grimsby, Lincolnshire.
Betsey	United Kingdom	The sloop sank off Saltfleet, Lincolnshire with the loss of a crew member. She was on a voyage from Middlesbrough, Yorkshire to Grimsby.
Carrer Bell	United Kingdom	The ship was driven ashore at Great Yarmouth, Norfolk.
Cygnet	United Kingdom	The brig was driven ashore and wrecked at Amble, Northumberland with the loss of a crew member. Survivors were rescued by the Coast Guard. She was on a voyage from the River Tyne to Aberdeen.
Eagle	United Kingdom	The ship was abandoned at sea. She was on a voyage from Cardiff, Glamorgan to Alexandria, Egypt.
Feofilo	Belgium	The brig was driven ashore at Grainthorpe, Lincolnshire, United Kingdom. Her crew were rescued. She became a wreck on 22 December.
G. O. Bigelow	United Kingdom	American Civil War: Discovered aground and without her cargo at the entrance to Bear Inlet on the coast of North Carolina, Confederate States of America by the armed screw steamer USS Mount Vernon and the armed supply ship USS New Berne (both United States Navy), the 90-ton schooner was scuttled and burned by Confederate forces to prevent her capture.
Grassmere	United Kingdom	The barque was wrecked on the Ship Rock, in the Belfast Lough. All on board were rescued. She was on a voyage from Glasgow, Renfrewshire to New Zealand.
Hannah and Sarah	United Kingdom	The ship was driven ashore and wrecked near Filey, Yorkshire. Her crew were rescued. She was on a voyage from London to Sunderland, County Durham.
Harley	United Kingdom	The brig ran aground on the Cross Sand, in the North Sea off the coast of Norfolk. She was on a voyage from Sunderland to London. She was refloated and taken in to Great Yarmouth, Norfolk.
Highbury	United Kingdom	The brig was driven ashore and wrecked at Scarborough, Yorkshire with the loss of two of her nine crew. She was on a voyage from South Shields, County Durham to London.
Julia	United Kingdom	The ship was abandoned in Bridlington Bay. She was on a voyage from Blakeney, Norfolk to South Shields.
Lady Ridley	United Kingdom	The schooner was wrecked on the Cat Rock, off the coast of Yorkshire. Her crew were rescued.
Margaret	United Kingdom	The ship was driven ashore and wrecked near Havre de Grâce, Seine-Inférieure, France. Her crew were rescued. She was on a voyage from Sunderland, County Durham to Caen, Calvados.
Mary and Catherine	United Kingdom	The schooner was driven ashore 4 nautical miles (7.4 km) south of Bridlington, Yorkshire. Her crew were rescued. She was on a voyage from Dundee, Forfarshire to South Shields.
Netta	United Kingdom	The ship was driven ashore and wrecked near Schwarzort, Prussia with the loss of two of her eight crew. She was on a voyage from Grangemouth, Stirlingshire to Memel, Prussia.
Orike and Johann	Netherlands	The ship was driven ashore on Langeoog, Groningen. She was on a voyage from the city of Groningen to Ipswich, Suffolk, United Kingdom.
Oriental	United Kingdom	The ship ran aground at West Hartlepool, County Durham. She was on a voyage from Stettin to Grangemouth, Stirlingshire. She was refloated and taken in to Hartlepool.
Pinkham	United Kingdom	The sloop foundered in the North Sea off Saltfleet, Lincolnshire with the loss of a crew member. She was on a voyage from Middlesbrough, Yorkshire to Grimsby, Lincolnshire.
Reward	United Kingdom	The ship was taken in to Great Yarmouth in a derelict condition. She was on a voyage from London to Leeds, Yorkshire.
Royal William	United Kingdom	The schooner ran aground on St Mary's Isle, Douglas, Isle of Man. She was on a voyage from Ardrossan, Ayrshire to Liverpool, Lancashire and Réunion. She was refloated and taken in to Douglas.

== 18 December ==
List of shipwrecks: 18 December 1863
Ship	State	Description
Alert	United Kingdom	The ship was driven ashore on Devar Island, Argyllshire. She was on a voyage from Maryport, Cumberland to Londonderry. She was refloated the next day.
Lea	United Kingdom	The schooner was driven ashore on Örö, Grand Duchy of Finland. Her crew were rescued. She was on a voyage from Kronstadt, Russia to London.
Orient	United Kingdom	The ship ran aground at Hartlepool, County Durham. She was on a voyage from Great Yarmouth, Norfolk to Hartlepool. She was refloated.

== 19 December ==
List of shipwrecks: 19 December 1863
Ship	State	Description
Auguste Louise	Hamburg	The steamship was driven ashore on Terschelling, Friesland, Netherlands. Fourteen people were rescued. She was on a voyage from Cardiff, Glamorgan, United Kingdom to Hamburg.
Heinrich	Bremen	The ship was driven ashore on Mayaguana, Bahamas. She was on a voyage from Savanilla, Granadine Confederation to Bremen.

== 20 December ==
List of shipwrecks: 20 December 1863
Ship	State	Description
Antonica	United Kingdom	American Civil War, Union blockade: Attempting to run the Union blockade by passing inshore of the armed sidewheel paddle steamers USS Connecticut and USS State of Georgia and the hermaphrodite brig USS Governor Buckingham (all United States Navy) and reach Wilmington, North Carolina, Confederate States of America, with a cargo of clothing, cotton, dry goods, general provisions, and liquor and $1,200 in cash, the 563-ton sidewheel paddle steamer ran aground on the western side of Frying Pan Shoals off Cape Fear, North Carolina. Her crew abandoned ship in her boats, and boat crews from Governor Buckingham captured 42 of her crew. Union forces could not refloat her, and she was abandoned. She broke up a few days later, becoming a total loss.
Cocchino	Italy	The ship was wrecked near Büyükliman, Ottoman Empire. Her crew were rescued.
Elizabeth Cann	(United Kingdom of Great Britain and Ireland) British North America	The ship was driven ashore near Toward Castle, Argyllshire. She was on a voyage from Bowling, Dunbartonshire to Boston, Massachusetts, United States. She was refloated and towed in to Greenock, Renfrewshire.
Haabet	Norway	The barque ran aground off Alicante, Spain. She was on a voyage from an English port to Alicante. She was refloated with assistance from the steamship Niña (Spain).
Hjalmar	Sweden	The ship ran aground and heeled over at Ramsgate, Kent, United Kingdom. She was on a voyage from Sundsvall to Manila, Spanish East Indies.
Powerful	United Kingdom	American Civil War, Union blockade: The sidewheel paddle steamer was abandoned by her crew and was captured at the mouth of the Suwannee River on the coast of Florida, Confederate States of America by the schooner USS Fox (United States Navy). Fox′s crew destroyed her when they could not stop a serious leak aboard her.
Quincy	United States	The 396-ton screw steamer foundered at Cape Hatteras, North Carolina, with the loss of 16 lives.
Thirteen unnamed vessels	Flags unknown	The ships were wrecked near Büyükliman.

== 21 December ==
List of shipwrecks: 21 December 1863
Ship	State	Description
Agnes	United Kingdom	The schooner foundered off Berwick upon Tweed, Northumberland. Her crew were rescued by the schooner Hope (United Kingdom). Agnes was on a voyage from Amble, Northumberland to Berwick upon Tweed. She came ashore at Cheswick, Northumberland on 23 December and was wrecked.
Frederick William	United Kingdom	The barque was abandoned off Texel, North Holland, Netherlands in a waterlogged condition with the loss of a crew member. Survivors were rescued by a Danzig brig. She was on a voyage from Newcastle upon Tyne, Northumberland to the Malabar Coast, India.
George Hughes	United Kingdom	The brig was driven ashore and wrecked east of Wells-next-the-Sea, Norfolk. She was on a voyage from South Shields, County Durham to Cartagena, Spain.
Hellespont	United Kingdom	The ship collided with the steamship Hydaspes (France) and sank in the South China Sea. Her crew were rescued.
Jean	United Kingdom	The sloop was driven ashore and wrecked at Souter Point, Northumberland. Her crew survived. She was on a voyage from Hull, Yorkshire to Sunderland, County Durham.
Little Aggie	United Kingdom	The schooner foundered off Berwick upon Tweed, Northumberland. Her crew were rescued by Hope (United Kingdom).
Sarah	United Kingdom	The ship ran aground off Bembridge, Isle of Wight. She was on a voyage from Waterford to Portsmouth, Hampshire. She was refloated the next day and taken in to Portsmouth in a leaky condition.
Tyne	United Kingdom	The schooner was driven ashore and wrecked on Inchgarvie, Lothian. She was on a voyage from South Queensferry, Lothian to Charleston, South Carolina, Confederate States of America. She was refloated on 23 December but was driven ashore at Montrose, Forfarshire.

== 22 December ==
List of shipwrecks: 22 December 1863
Ship	State	Description
Allen	(United Kingdom of Great Britain and Ireland) Jersey	The schooner was driven ashore and wrecked at Walcott, Norfolk. Her crew were rescued by the Coast Guard using rocket apparatus. She was on a voyage from London to South Shields, County Durham. She was refloated on 10 January 1864 and towed in to Great Yarmouth, Norfolk.
Amanda	Denmark	The schooner was wrecked on Læsø. Her crew were rescued. She was on a voyage from Newcastle upon Tyne, Northumberland, United Kingdom to Aarhus.
Axe	United Kingdom	The ship was wrecked on Anholt, Denmark. Her crew survived. She was on a voyage from Montrose, Forfarshire to a Baltic port.
Choice	United Kingdom	The smack was driven ashore at Grainthorpe, Lincolnshire.
Iddlea	United Kingdom	The ship foundered off Lannion, Côtes-du-Nord, France.
Louise	Rostock	The ship was driven ashore east of Warnemünde, Prussia with the loss of two of her crew. She was on a voyage from North Shields, Northumberland to Warnemünde.
Orient	United Kingdom	The brig was driven ashore at Walcott. Her crew were rescued. She was later refloated and taken in to Great Yarmouth. She arrived at North Shields under tow on 10 February 1864 for repairs.
Pearl	(United Kingdom of Great Britain and Ireland) British North America	The ship collided with the steamship Pladda (United Kingdom) and was beached on the Isle of Arran. Her crew survived. She was on a voyage from Troon, Ayrshire to Londonderry.
Puma	Denmark	The schooner ran aground at Dragør. She was on a voyage from Ystad, Sweden to London.
Speculant	United Kingdom	The ship was driven ashore at Hjørring, Denmark with the loss of a crew member. She was on a voyage from Neustadt in Holstein, Duchy of Holstein to Leith, Lothian.

== 23 December ==
List of shipwrecks: 23 December 1863
Ship	State	Description
British India	United Kingdom	The ship was driven ashore in Carmarthen Bay. She was on a voyage from Bombay, India to Liverpool, Lancashire.
Hopper	United Kingdom	The sloop was wrecked at North Sunderland, County Durham. Her crew were rescued. She was on a voyage from Montrose, Forfarshire to Sunderland, County Durham.
Johanna Margareta	Netherlands	The ship ran aground in the Nieuw Diep with the loss of all but two of those aboard. She was on a voyage from Newcastle upon Tyne, Northumberland, United Kingdom to Zwolle, Overijssel.
HMS Lively	Royal Navy	The Albacore-class gunboat was wrecked on Schiermonnikoog, Groningen, Netherlands with the loss of her pilot. Her crew were rescued by a Dutch smack.
Kingston	United Kingdom	The ship foundered off Texel, North Holland, Netherlands with the loss of all hands.
Petronella	Flag unknown	The ship foundered in the North Sea off the Dutch coast.
Reverisco	United Kingdom	The brig was wrecked on The Platters, off Anglesey. Her crew were rescued. She was on a voyage from Pomaron, Portugal to Liverpool.
Richard and Harry	United Kingdom	The ship foundered off Texel with the loss of all hands.
Rowena	United Kingdom	The yacht was driven ashore in Cardwell Bay, Renfrewshire. She was refloated.
Satisfaction	Prussia	The ship was driven ashore at Redcar, Yorkshire, United Kingdom. She was on a voyage from Danzig to West Hartlepool, County Durham. She was refloated the next day and towed in to West Hartlepool.
Sumatra	Sweden	The ship was lost off Vlieland, Friesland with the loss of all but two or three of her crew. She was on a voyage from London, United Kingdom to Gothenburg.

== 24 December ==
List of shipwrecks: 24 December 1863
Ship	State	Description
Frederick Lange	Flag unknown	The ship was holed by ice in the Elbe.
Greyhound	United Kingdom	The brig was driven ashore at Spaniard's Bay, Newfoundland, British North America. She was on a voyage from Bristol, Gloucestershire to Harbour Grace, Newfoundland. She was refloated on 28 December and taken in to Harbour Grace in a severely leaky condition.
Norrell	United Kingdom	The schooner struck a rock off Donaghadee, County Down. She was on a voyage from Ayr to Liverpool, Lancashire. She was refloated and sailed for Belfast, County Antrim. No further trace.
Sir Robert Peel	United Kingdom	The ship was driven ashore and wrecked on Juist, Kingdom of Hanover. Her crew were rescued. She was on a voyage from New York, United States to Hamburg.
Texan Star	United Kingdom	American Civil War, CSS Alabama's South Pacific Expeditionary Raid: The 799-ton barque, carrying a cargo of rice and bound for Singapore, Straits Settlements, was captured and burned in the Strait of Malacca by the screw sloop-of-war CSS Alabama (Confederate States Navy).
Victory	United Kingdom	The barque exploded and sank 4 nautical miles (7.4 km) off Ilfracombe, Devon. Her crew were rescued by a smack.

== 25 December ==
List of shipwrecks: 25 December 1863
Ship	State	Description
Susan and Ann	United Kingdom	The brig was abandoned in the North Sea 70 nautical miles (130 km) off Flamborough Head, Yorkshire. Her crew were rescued by Svea (Sweden). Susan and Ann was on a voyage from Gothenburg, Sweden to Tayport, Fife.
Violette	France	The ship was driven ashore on Saint Pierre Island. She was on a voyage from Saint-Malo, Ille-et-Vilaine to the West Indies. She was later refloated.

== 26 December ==
List of shipwrecks: 26 December 1863
Ship	State	Description
Harlingerland	Kingdom of Hanover	The galiot was driven ashore on Ibiza, Spain. She was on a voyage from Sulina, Ottoman Empire to an English port.
Highlander	United States	American Civil War, CSS Alabama's South Pacific Expeditionary Raid: During a voyage in ballast from Singapore, Straits Settlements to Burma, the 1,049- or 1,050-ton (sources disagree) clipper was captured and burned at the western entrance of the Strait of Malacca by the screw sloop-of-war CSS Alabama (Confederate States Navy).
Sonora	United States	American Civil War, CSS Alabama's South Pacific Expeditionary Raid: During a voyage in ballast from Singapore to Burma, the 707-ton full-rigged ship was captured and burned at the western entrance of the Strait of Malacca by the screw sloop-of-war CSS Alabama (Confederate States Navy).

== 27 December ==
List of shipwrecks: 27 December 1863
Ship	State	Description
Constance	United Kingdom	The ship was driven ashore and wrecked near Swinemünde, Prussia. Her crew were rescued. She was on a voyage from Newcastle upon Tyne, Northumberland to Rostock.
Farewell	United Kingdom	The ship was wrecked at "Moropoer", Denmark. Her crew were rescued. She was on a voyage from Danzig to Grangemouth, Stirlingshire.

== 28 December ==
List of shipwrecks: 28 December 1863
Ship	State	Description
Aid	United Kingdom	The schooner was wrecked on "Raza", Outer Hebrides. She was on a voyage from Kirkwall, Orkney Islands to Tobermory, Isle of Mull.
Alma	Norway	The ship was driven ashore near Ringkøbing. She was on a voyage from Fredrikstad to Leith, Lothian, United Kingdom.
Bessie Rowe	United Kingdom	The ship was driven ashore in the Oste. She was on a voyage from Hamburg to Plymouth, Devon.
Sarah	United Kingdom	The schooner ran aground on the Cross Sand, in the North Sea off the coast of Norfolk. She was on a voyage from Poole, Dorset to Hartlepool, County Durham. She was refloated and found to be leaky.
Tiger	United Kingdom	The ship was driven ashore in the Oste. She was on a voyage from Hamburg to Great Yarmouth, Norfolk.

== 29 December ==
List of shipwrecks: 29 December 1863
Ship	State	Description
Bertha	(United Kingdom of Great Britain and Ireland) British North America	The ship sprang a leak and was beached on Saint Pierre Island.
Brothers	United Kingdom	The ship sank off Harwich, Essex. She was on a voyage from Maldon, Essex to Wakefield, Yorkshire. She was refloated on 9 January 1864 and taken in to Harwich in a waterlogged condition.
Caroline Gertrude	Confederate States of America	American Civil War, Union blockade: The schooner, a blockade runner carrying a cargo of cotton to Havana, Cuba, ran aground on a bar just inside the mouth of the Ocklockonee River on the coast of Florida and was boarded and burned by boat crews from the screw steamer USS Stars and Stripes (United States Navy).
King William	United Kingdom	The schooner was abandoned in the Irish Sea off the coast of County Antrim. Her crew survived. She was on a voyage from Glasgow, Renfrewshire to Bilbao, Spain.
Millman	United Kingdom	The brig struck the pier at Ramsgate, Kent and was severely damaged.
Northumberland	United Kingdom	The steamship ran aground on the Cross Sand, in the North Sea off the coast of Norfolk. She was on a voyage from London to the River Tyne.
Sportsman	United Kingdom	The coasting schooner ran aground on Taylor's Bank, in Liverpool Bay and sank. Her three crew got on board the Crosby Lightship ( Trinity House). Sportsman was on a voyage from Liverpool, Lancashire to Douglas, Isle of Man.
Unidentified vessel	Confederate States of America	Carrying a cargo of Mexican blankets, salt, and sundries, the vessel was driven ashore on the coast of Texas 5 nautical miles (9.3 km) from the mouth of the San Bernard River during a storm.

== 30 December ==
List of shipwrecks: 30 December 1863
Ship	State	Description
Dashaway	Flagnknown	The schooner may have been stranded on the coast of California on this date. If so, she was refloated and returned to service.
Johns	United Kingdom	The schooner ran aground and sank at Fortrose, Ross-shire. Her crew were rescued. She was on a voyage from Newcastle upon Tyne, Northumberland to Inverness.
Mary Ann	United Kingdom	The ship ran aground on the Hurst Spit, Hampshire. She was on a voyage from Sunderland, County Durham to Southampton, Hampshire. She was refloated on 1 January 1864 with the assistance of a tug and taken in to Southampton.
Montana	United Kingdom	The paddle steamer was wrecked on the reef off the north shore of Bermuda, becoming a total loss. Her crew and most of her cargo were saved.
Nola	United Kingdom	American Civil War, Union blockade: During a blockade-running voyage from Glasgow, Scotland, with a cargo of dry goods, the 607-Gross register ton sidewheel paddle steamer was driven onto a reef and wrecked in the Western Blue Cut area off Ireland Island, Bermuda.
Orion	United Kingdom	The barque was driven ashore west of Skagen, Denmark.
Success	(United Kingdom of Great Britain and Ireland) New Zealand	The 55-ton schooner was wrecked in Palliser Bay during a gale, with the loss of two of the five crew. She was en route from Lyttelton to Auckland.
William	United Kingdom	The brigantine was driven ashore in Cloghy Bay. She was on a voyage from Glasgow, Renfrewshire to Spain.

== 31 December ==
List of shipwrecks: 31 December 1863
Ship	State	Description
Blenheim	United Kingdom	The steamship ran aground on the Maasdroogen, in the North Sea off the coast of South Holland, Netherlands. She was on a voyage from Harwich, Essex to Rotterdam, South Holland. She was refloated on 2 January 1864.
Dalkeith	United Kingdom	The ship struck the quayside and was severely damaged at Fraserburgh, Aberdeenshire.
Defiance	United Kingdom	The schooner was wrecked on the Isle of Coll, Inner Hebrides. She was on a voyage from Isleornsay, Isle of Skye, Outer Hebrides to Port Glasgow, Renfrewshire.
Egeria	United Kingdom	The barque was wrecked at Matsumai, Japan. She was on a voyage from Shanghai, China to Hakodadi, Japan.
Ernesto	Austrian Empire	The brig ran aground, heeled over and was severely damaged at Dover, Kent, United Kingdom. She was on a voyage from "Marianople", Russia to Dover. She was declared a total loss and was broken up.
Hope	United Kingdom	The ship foundered in the Bristol Channel 22 nautical miles (41 km) west south west of Lundy Island, Devon. Her crew were rescued. She was on a voyage from Par, Cornwall to Swansea, Glamorgan.
James Watt	United Kingdom	The schooner foundered off Lamlash, Isle of Arran with the loss of all hands. She was on a voyage from Ayr to Belfast, County Antrim.
Lammermuir	United Kingdom	The ship struck a reef in the Gaspar Strait and sank. She was on a voyage from Shanghai, China to London.
Othello	United Kingdom	The ship foundered in the North Sea off Filey, East Riding of Yorkshire.
Prince of Wales	United Kingdom	The steamship ran aground on the Maasdroogen.
Providence	United Kingdom	The ship collided with another vessel and was abandoned. She was on a voyage from Liverpool, Lancashire to Havre de Grâce, Seine-Inférieure, France.
Samarang	United Kingdom	The ship ran aground off the Goodwin Middle Lightship ( Trinity House). She was on a voyage from South Shields County Durham to Cartagena, Spain She was refloated and found to be severely leaky and put in to Gravesend, Kent.
Slaney	United Kingdom	The schooner was driven ashore at Cahore Point, County Wexford. She was on a voyage from Wexford to Cardiff, Glamorgan.
Victory	United Kingdom	The brig was driven ashore at Dovercourt, Essex. She was on a voyage from Dover to Blyth, Northumberland.
Vorwarts	Russia	The schooner was driven ashore on "Zanzo". She was on a voyage from Ventspils to Lowestoft, Suffolk, United Kingdom.
Unnamed	Prussia	The barque was wrecked on "Zanzo".

== Unknown date ==
List of shipwrecks: Unknown date in December 1863
Ship	State	Description
Abo	Flag unknown	The ship was wrecked at "Romoc".
Acto	United Kingdom	The ship was wrecked on the Dogger Bank. She was on a voyage from Stockholm, Sweden to London.
Adler	Hamburg	The schooner foundered in the North Sea. Her crew were rescued. She was on a voyage from Middlesbrough, Yorkshire, United Kingdom to Hamburg.
Ailsa	United Kingdom	The ship ran aground on the Arklow Bank, in the Irish Sea off the coast of County Wicklow. She was refloated and put back to Troon, Ayrshire.
Albert	United Kingdom	The ship was wrecked near Étaples, Pas-de-Calais, France. She was on a voyage from Alexandria, Egypt to Aberdeen.
Albert	United Kingdom	The steamship put in to Texel, North Holland, Netherlands in a sinking condition. She was on a voyage from Hull, Yorkshire to Amsterdam, North Holland.
Albert	France	The ship was wrecked at Cherbourg, Seine-Inférieure.
Alchymist	United Kingdom	The ship was abandoned in the North Sea. Her crew were rescued. She was on a voyage from Riga, Russia to London.
Alert	United Kingdom	The steamship was abandoned in the North Sea in a sinking condition before 5 December. Her crew were rescued by Hanse (Bremen). Alert was on a voyage from Hull, Yorkshire to Hamburg. She was subsequently towed in to the Nieuw Diep. She arrived at Hull in a wrecked condition on 22 December.
Anna and Sarah	United Kingdom	The ship was driven ashore at Filey, Yorkshire.
Anna Maria Wilhelmina	Netherlands	The ship ran aground in the Bali Strait. She was on a voyage from Amsterdam to Japan. She was refloated and put in to Surabaya, Netherlands East Indies in a leaky condition on 10 December.
Annegiena	Bremen	The ship sank at Bremen.
Annesi Medoc	Netherlands	The derelict schooner was driven ashore on Terschelling, Friesland.
August	United Kingdom	The ship was run ashore at Palermo, Sicily, Italy. She was on a voyage from Taganrog, Russia to London.
Ball	United Kingdom	The brigantine collided with another vessel off the North Foreland, Kent and was abandoned by all but one of her crew.
Banffshire	United Kingdom	The schooner was abandoned in the North Sea before 7 December with the loss of all but two of her crew. She was on a voyage from Danzig to Hartlepool, County Durham.
Bendigo	Confederate States of America	American Civil War, Union Blockade: The paddle steamer, a blockade runner, was run ashore in Lockwood's Folly Inlet in late December to prevent capture by a United States Navy squadron. She was set afire and abandoned. Bendigo was on a voyage from Nassau, Bahamas to Saint John, New Brunswick, British North America. She was shelled and severely damaged on 3 January 1846 by USS Fahkee (United States Navy. USS Daylight, USS Fort Jackson, USS Iron Age, and USS Montgomery (all United States Navy) completed her destruction the following day.
Bertha	United States	The ship was wrecked near Luzon, Spanish East Indies.
Bona Fide	United Kingdom	The derelict ship was driven ashore on Skagen, Denmark.
Bridlington	United Kingdom	The collier was presumed to have foundered in the North Sea.
British Queen	United Kingdom	The ship collided with the schooner Emblem (United Kingdom and foundered in the English Channel off The Lizard, Cornwall. Her crew were rescued by a fishing boat. She was on a voyage from Newcastle upon Tyne, Northumberland to "Zealm".
Brucks	United Kingdom	The ship foundered in the North Sea. She was on a voyage from Saint Petersburg to London.
Bulwark	United Kingdom	The ship was driven ashore at Lamlash, Isle of Arran.
Cadmus	United Kingdom	The ship ran aground and sank off "Hermano". She was on a voyage from Weymouth, Dorset to Gothenburg, Sweden.
Camperdown	United Kingdom	The full-rigged ship was discovered in a sinking condition in the North Sea off the coast of West Flanders, Belgium by the cutter Perle (Belgium), which took off eleven of her crew. Fate of the vessel and rest of her crew unknown.
Capella	United Kingdom	The ship ran aground at Copenhagen, Denmark. She was on a voyage from Riga to Leith, Lothian.
Catherine	United Kingdom	The ship was lost near the Pilsum Lighthouse before 8 December. She was on a voyage from Emden, Kingdom of Hanover to London.
Catherine and Mary	United Kingdom	The ship was wrecked on South Uist, Outer Hebrides. She was on a voyage from Stettin to Drogheda, County Louth.
Charity	United Kingdom	The ship foundered in the North Sea with the loss of all hands.
City of Sydney	United Kingdom	The ship was abandoned on the Dogger Bank. She was on a voyage from Soderhamn, Sweden to London.
Clara and Candace	United Kingdom	The ship was wrecked at Milford Haven, Pembrokeshire.
Clasina Arendina	Netherlands	The ship was driven ashore near Katwijk, South Holland. She was on a voyage from Rotterdam, South Holland to Belfast, County Antrim, United Kingdom.
Clymax	United Kingdom	The schooner was driven ashore on Salt Island, Anglesey. Her crew were rescued.
Combie	Kingdom of Hanover	The galiot was wrecked on the Goodwin Sands, Kent, United Kingdom. Her crew were rescued. She was on a voyage from Bremen to Rouen, Seine-Inférieure.
Comte Roger	France	The ship was driven ashore on the Brazilian coast. She was refloated and taken in to Maranhão in a leaky condition.
Corredifia	Bremen	The ship ran aground on the Scaro Reef in the Baltic Sea. She was on a voyage from Ventava, Courland Governorate to Bremen. She was refloated and put in to Gothenburg, Sweden in a leaky condition.
Cricket	United Kingdom	The steamship ran aground at Llanelly, Glamorgan.
Dahlia	United Kingdom	The ship was wrecked on the Melvine Reef, in the Bay of Lannion before 28 December.
Dauntless	United Kingdom	The ship was driven ashore near Brielle, South Holland, Netherlands.
Dawn	United Kingdom	The brig ran aground on the Newcombe Sand, in the North Sea off the coast of Suffolk. She was on a voyage from London to Newcastle upon Tyne. She was refloated and taken in to Lowestoft, Suffolk in a severely leaky condition.
Dido	Hamburg	The schooner was wrecked at "Kandestederner".
Douse Apostles	France	The ship was wrecked on Sark, Channel Islands. She was on a voyage from Nantes, Loire-Inférieure to Guernsey, Channel Islands.
Dublin	United Kingdom	The ship struck a rock off "Novara Kistra", Russia and was abandoned by her crew. She was on a voyage from Kronstadt, Russia to Grimsby, Lincolnshire. She subsequently came ashore in Sooja Bay.
Elise Antoinette	United Kingdom	The ship was abandoned in the North Sea 50 nautical miles (93 km) off the Dutch coast before 10 December. Her crew were rescued by a smack. She was on a voyage from Newcastle upon Tyne to Alexandria.
Ellengowan	United Kingdom	The ship ran aground on the Swine Bottoms, in the Baltic Sea. She was on a voyage from Ventava to an English port. She was refloated and put in to Helsingør, Denmark on 30 December in a leaky condition.
Elvira	United Kingdom	The ship sank off Borkum, Kingdom of Hanover. She was on a voyage from Saint Petersburg to London.
Emilie	France	The ship was driven ashore at Breaksea Point, Glamorgan. She was on a voyage from Cardiff, Glamorgan to Nantes, Loire-Inférieure.
Emma Colvin	(United Kingdom of Great Britain and Ireland) New South Wales	The ship was wrecked on the coast of New Caledonia.
Ernestine	United Kingdom	The ship was wrecked near Nassau. She was on a voyage from Bermuda to Nassau.
Epulo	United Kingdom	The ship was lost in the North Sea on or before 8 December. Her crew were rescued. She was on a voyage from Newcastle upon Tyne to Constantinople, Ottoman Empire.
Equito	Spain	The ship was wrecked. She was on a voyage from Newcastle upon Tyne to Cartagena.
Estella Maria	France	The schooner was driven ashore on the Irish coast. She was refloated on 8 December and taken in to Killough, County Down, United Kingdom.
Eugenie	Sweden	The ship was wrecked at "Oster Kilt" with the loss of three of her crew.s She was on a voyage from Newcastle upon Tyne to Malmö.
Eugie	United Kingdom	The ship was lost in the North Sea. She was on a voyage from the River Tyne to London.
Evangelista	Flag unknown	The ship was driven ashore near "Cabbernado".
Eveline	(United Kingdom of Great Britain and Ireland) Cape Colony	The schooner was wrecked at Danger Point before 21 December with the loss of four lives.
Faerie Queen	United Kingdom	The ship was driven onto the Calshot Spit, in the Solent.
Floriville	United Kingdom	The collier was presumed to have foundered in the North Sea.
Frederick Bruce	United Kingdom	The barque was abandoned in the Atlantic Ocean before 26 December.
Ganges	United Kingdom	The ship was abandoned in the North Sea before 12 December. Her crew were rescued. She was on a voyage from Vyborg, Grand Duchy of Finland to South Shields, County Durham.
Ganymede	United Kingdom	The ship was abandoned in the North Sea before 6 December. Her crew were rescued by a Norwegian vessel. She was on a voyage from Danzig to Hartlepool.
George	Flag unknown	The ship was driven ashore at "Westerklet". She was on a voyage from Königsberg, Prussia to Leer, Kingdom of Hanover.
Globe	United Kingdom	The ship was abandoned at sea before 6 December. She was discovered in the Kattegat and was taken in to Varberg, Sweden in a derelict condition on 15 December.
Godt Haab	Norway	The brig was abandoned in the North Sea on or before 12 December. Her crew were rescued by the brig Belize (United Kingdom). Godt Haab was on a voyage from Norway to Málaga, Spain. She was towed in to Copenhagenin a derelict condition on 14 December by the steamship Vanguard (United Kingdom).
Golden Light	United Kingdom	The brig was lost off Corn Island, on the Mosquito Coast. At least four crew survived.
Hamilton	United Kingdom	The ship was wrecked at Belfast Her crew were rescued. She was on a voyage from Liverpool to La Spezia, Italy.
Hendrika	Duchy of Holstein	The koff ran aground off Callantsoog, Kingdom of Hanover. Her crew were rescued. She was on a voyage from Newcastle upon Tyne to Eckernförde.
Hinda	United Kingdom	The ship was driven ashore and wrecked near Trelleborg, Sweden.
Humility	United Kingdom	The brig was abandoned at sea before 20 December. Her crew were rescued by Goldhoorn (Netherlands). Humility was on a voyage from Danzig to London.
Industry	United Kingdom	The ship was driven ashore and wrecked at Rønne, Denmark. She was on a voyage from Stockholm, Sweden to Lisbon, Portugal
Irene	Netherlands	The ship was wrecked near "Steenberg". She was on a voyage from Saint Petersburg to Schiedam, South Holland.
Janet Patterson	United Kingdom	The full-rigged ship was wrecked in the Magdalen Islands, Nova Scotia, British North America. Her crew were rescued. She was on a voyage from Richibucto, New Brunswick to Liverpool, Lancashire.
Jessie McGaskin	United Kingdom	The ship sank at Kingstown, County Dublin.
CSS John F. Carr	Confederate States Navy	American Civil War: The 200-ton sidewheel cottonclad gunboat was driven ashore on the Matagorda Peninsula on the coast of Texas, Confederate States of America by a severe gale and was burned to prevent her capture by Union forces on 30 or 31 December. Sources differ on her fate, claiming that the fire destroyed her or that Union forces pulled her onto a bank at Lynchburg, Texas to prevent her from sinking in deep water and that she apparently was recaptured by the Confederates and returned to Confederate States Navy service.
John Margrieta	Netherlands	The ship was wrecked off Harlingen, Friesland. She was on a voyage from the Tyne to Zwolle, Gelderland.
John Wesley	United Kingdom	The ship was driven ashore near Galway. She was on a voyage from Helsinki, Grand Duchy of Finland to Maroim, Brazil.
Jonge Jacob	Netherlands	The galiot was driven ashore at Fedderwardersiel, Kingdom of Hanover before 9 December.
Jonge Paul	Flag unknown	The steamship sank at Norderney, Kingdom of Hanover.
Jubilee	United Kingdom	The ship departed from Newry, County Antrim for Preston, Lancashire in early December. Presumed foundered in the Irish Sea with the loss of all hands.
Kong Sverre	Norway	The ship was abandoned in the North Sea on or before 19 December. her crew were rescued by Jupiter ( Danzig). Kong Sverre was on a voyage from Gävle, Sweden to Santander, Spain.
Lady Sandys	United Kingdom	The ship was abandoned in the North Sea. She was on a voyage from London to Whitby, Yorkshire.
Leriope	United Kingdom	The barque was wrecked near Ballyconnolly, County Galway.
Lillydale	United Kingdom	The ship sank in the Bay of Fundy. She was on a voyage from Windsor, Nova Scotia, British North America to New York.
Lizzie Barnard	United States	The ship was lost near Havana, Cuba. She was on a voyage from New York to Havana.
Luna	Norway	The ship was driven ashore on Spiekeroog, Kingdom of Hanover.
Maastroom	Netherlands	The steamship was driven ashore on Terschelling. All on board were rescued.
Maid of Aln	United Kingdom	The ship was wrecked at Berwick upon Tweed, Northumberland.
Margaretta	Russia	The ship was driven ashore on Grassholm, Pembrokeshire. She was on a voyage from Kronstadt to Cork, United Kingdom.
Maria	Italy	The brig was wrecked at Odesa.
Martin Luther	United Kingdom	The ship abandoned at sea in a waterlogged condition. Her crew were rescued. She was on a voyage from Quebec City to a British port.
Mary Ann	United Kingdom	The barque was driven ashore on Spruce Island, New Brunswick after 11 December. She was on a voyage from Saint John, New Brunswick to Havana. She was later refloated and towed in to Saint John, where she arrived on 24 December in a waterlogged condition
Mathurin Cor	France	The ship was wrecked at Cárdenas, Cuba. She was on a voyage from Cárdenas to Havre de Grâce, Seine-Inférieure.
Messenger	United Kingdom	The ship ran aground on the Pennington Spit. She was on a voyage from Waterford to Portsmouth, Hampshire.
Naiad	United Kingdom	The ship was driven ashore at Cherbourg. She was on a voyage from Swansea to Havre de Grâce.
Nicholas	United Kingdom	The ship was wrecked on the Asiatic coast.
Olivia	United Kingdom	The ship was lost on the Dogger Bank before 19 December. Her crew were rescued She was on a voyage from Gothenburg, Sweden to Southampton, Hampshire.
Onka and Johanna	Netherlands	The ship foundered in the North Sea. She was on a voyage from Zoutkamp, Groningen to Ipswich, Suffolk.
Oriental	Prussia	The barque was wrecked on the Saratoga Spit. She was on a voyage from Hong Kong to Yokohama, Japan.
Peter Annens	United Kingdom	The ship struck the Anegada Reef. She was refloated and put in to Saint Thomas, Virgin Islands in a leaky condition.
Province	United Kingdom	The ship foundered. She was on a voyage from a port in Overijssel, Netherlands to Dundee, Forfarshire.
Resiza	Russia	The ship was driven ashore at Ochakov. She was on a voyage from Nicolaieff to Antwerp, Belgium.
Robert	United Kingdom	The ship collided with Speedwell and sank in the North Sea off Skegness, Lincolnshire. She was on a voyage from London to Hartlepool.
Rondinilla	United Kingdom	The barque was abandoned in the North Sea with the loss of a crew member. She subsequently came ashore on Fanø, Denmark on 17 December.
Rosalie, or Rosa Lee	Confederate States of America	American Civil War, Union blockade: The schooner burned in the Gulf of Mexico off the coast of Texas.
Royal Union	United Kingdom	The ship foundered in the North Sea with the loss of all hands.
Salus	United Kingdom	The ship was driven ashore at Terneuzen, Zeeland, Netherlands.
San Francisco	Flag unknown	The ship was driven ashore at Bremen.
Sea Carne	United Kingdom	The ship was driven ashore on Örö, Grand Duchy of Finland. She was on a voyage from Newcastle upon Tyne to Kronstadt. She was refloated in June 1864 and taken in to a Finnish port.
Seamew	United Kingdom	The ship foundered. She was on a voyage from Gothenburg, Sweden to London.
Souchay	(United Kingdom of Great Britain and Ireland) Victoria	The steamship ran aground at Melbourne. She was refloated.
Sparrow Hawk	United Kingdom	The smack was driven ashore at Arbroath, Forfarshire. She was refloated on 8 December and taken in to Arbroath.
St. Crispin	United States of the Ionian Islands	The brig was abandoned off Büyükdere, Ottoman Empire.
Sunderland	United Kingdom	The ship struck a sunken wreck in the Gull Stream and sank. Her crew were rescued. She was on a voyage from San Francisco to a British port.
Susannah Ann	United Kingdom	The brig was abandoned in the North Sea before 26 December.
Tapio	Russia	The barque was driven ashore and wrecked at Memel, Prussia. Her crew were rescued. She was on a voyage from Christiania, Norway to London.
Telegram	United Kingdom	The ship was abandoned at sea. Her crew were rescued. She was on a voyage from Danzig to the River Tyne. Telegram was discovered derelict by Ambassador (United Kingdom), which put some of her crew on board and she was taken in to Kristiansand, Norway.
Thomas Wright	(United Kingdom of Great Britain and Ireland) British North America	The ship ran aground on a reef off Saint Domingo.
Trois Alrennes	France	The ship was driven ashore at Camaret-sur-Mer, Finistère. She was on a voyage from Whitehaven, Cumberland to a French port.
Ugie	United Kingdom	The ship was lost on or before 4 December with the loss of three of her crew.
Venus	Hamburg	The ship was driven ashore near "Vlulpo". She was on a voyage from Hamburg to Curaçao.
Venus	Flag unknown	The derelict ship was driven ashore on "Uisk".
Vesper	United Kingdom	The collier was presumed to have foundered in the North Sea.
Victory	United Kingdom	The ship foundered in the Bristol Channel off Ilfracombe, Devon before 19 December.
Ward Jackson	United Kingdom	The ship was driven ashore on Schiermonnikoog, Friesland. Her crew were rescued. She was on a voyage from Hamburg to Dublin.
Wilhelmina	Denmark	The ship was driven ashore near "Ballien". She was on a voyage from Saxkøbing to London.
Wilkinson	United Kingdom	The collier was presumed to have foundered in the North Sea.
William	United Kingdom	The ship foundered in the North Sea with the loss of all hands.
William	United Kingdom	The ship was wrecked. She was on a voyage from Veracruz, Mexico to Matanzas, Cuba.
William and George	United Kingdom	The ship foundered in the North Sea (57°22′N 6°45′E) on or before 8 December.
Windspiel	Netherlands	The barque was driven ashore in the Nieuw Diep with the loss of nine of her crew. She was on a voyage from Baltimore, Maryland, United States to Amsterdam.
Zwaluw	Netherlands	The ship was wrecked near Amsterdam. She was on a voyage from Buenos Aires, Argentina to Amsterdam.
Two unnamed vessels	Flags unknown	The ships were wrecked at "Romoc".
