= USS Sea Bird =

Gunboat of the United States Navy

History

United States
- Acquired: 12 July 1863
- Commissioned: July/August 1863
- Decommissioned: 28 June 1865
- Captured: by Union Navy forces, 13 May 1863
- Fate: Sold, 28 June 1865

General characteristics
- Displacement: 58 tons
- Length: 59 ft 8 in (18.19 m)
- Beam: 18 ft 4 in (5.59 m)
- Draft: 6 ft 12 in (2.13 m)
- Depth of hold: 7 ft 6 in (2.29 m)
- Propulsion: schooner sail
- Complement: 15
- Armament: one 12-pounder howitzer

USS Sea Bird was a captured Confederate schooner acquired by the Union Navy from the prize court during the American Civil War.

She was put into service as a gunboat by the Union Navy to patrol navigable waterways of the Confederacy to prevent the South from trading with other countries.

== Service history ==
Sea Bird—a schooner captured by Union side wheel steamer DeSoto on 13 May 1863—was purchased by the Navy on 12 July 1863 from the Key West, Florida, prize court. The ship was soon fitted out at Key West and commissioned there either in late July or in early August, Acting Master Charles P. Clark in command. The schooner was ordered to cruise in the Gulf of Mexico seeking blockade runners. On 15 October, she—along with USS Fox and USS Two Sisters—helped USS Honduras pursue British steamer Mail which Honduras caught near St. Petersburg, Florida, after a three-hour chase. The blockade runner had slipped out of Bayport, Florida, laden with cotton and bound for Havana, Cuba.

In July 1864, Sea Bird and three other small sailing ships carried Union troops and landed them for a raid on Brookville, Florida. After disembarking the soldiers, Sea Bird and USS Ariel proceeded to Bayport, Florida, where a landing party captured a quantity of cotton and burned the customs house before returning to Anclote Keys. On 21 October, Sea Bird captured British schooner Lucy off Anclote Keys with an assorted cargo. Active until the end of the Civil War, Sea Bird took her last prizes on 11 April 1865 when she seized sloops Florida and Annie laden with cotton off Crystal River, Florida. She destroyed both. After the return of peace, Sea Bird was decommissioned and sold at public auction at Key West to W. F. Pitcher on 28 June 1865.

== See also ==
- Blockade runners of the American Civil War
- Blockade mail of the Confederacy
- Union Blockade
