= USS Two Sisters =

Gunboat of the United States Navy

History

United States
- Launched: 1856
- Commissioned: 30 January 1863
- Decommissioned: 1865
- Captured: by Union forces; 21 September 1862
- Fate: Sold, 28 June 1865

General characteristics
- Displacement: 54 tons
- Propulsion: sail
- Armament: one 12-pounder gun

USS Two Sisters was a small 54-ton captured Confederate schooner acquired by the Union Navy from the prize court during the American Civil War.

Two Sisters was put into service as a gunboat and, when required, as a ship's tender, by the Union Navy to patrol navigable waterways of the Confederacy to prevent the South from trading with other countries.

== Service history ==
Two Sisters, a schooner built in 1856 at Baltimore, Maryland, was captured on 21 September 1862 by the Union steamer USS Albatross off the mouth of the Rio Grande while attempting to slip through the Federal blockade to Brownsville, Texas, with a cargo of 87 bales of gunny cloth needed by the Confederacy for baling cotton. Subsequently purchased by the Navy from the Prize Court at Key West, Florida, Two Sisters was commissioned on 30 January 1863 at Key West, Acting Master William A. Arthur in command. Assigned to the East Gulf Blockading Squadron, Two Sisters took her first prize on 1 February—seizing the sloop Richards off Boca Grande, Florida. On 30 April, the Union schooner captured the cotton-carrying blockade runner Agnes off the Tortugas, before taking the schooner Oliver S. Breese off Anclote Keys, Florida.

Two Sisters continued her patrols on the blockade through the spring, summer, and early fall, keeping a wary eye on the route between Bayport, Florida, and Havana, Cuba. On 15 October, she, USS Sea Bird, and USS Fox assisted USS Honduras in the capture of the Havana-bound British steamer Mail, which had attempted to run the blockade laden with cotton and turpentine. Bayport proved to be a good hunting ground. Two Sisters also captured the schooner Maria Alberta there on 27 November. On 13 January 1864, while Two Sisters was stationed off the mouth of the Suwannee River, a boat crew debarked from her and captured the schooner William with its cargo of salt, bagging, and rope. The Union schooner's patrol duty was broken in May by service as tender to the steam frigate USS San Jacinto. She then resumed independent blockade service through the onset of winter.

On 3 December 1864, Two Sisters participated in an early amphibious-type operation. Her boats and crews joined others from USS Nita, USS Stars and Stripes, and USS Hendrick Hudson, all under the command of Acting Lt. Robert B. Smith, in a raid on Tampa Bay, Florida, in which they destroyed the large Confederate salt work at Rocky Point. Two Sisters subsequently remained on duty blockading the Florida coast for the duration of the Civil War. Two Sisters was sold in a public auction to J. Jones on 28 June 1865.

== See also ==
- Blockade runners of the American Civil War
- Blockade mail of the Confederacy
