= USS James L. Davis =

Gunboat of the United States Navy

History

United States
- Acquired: 29 September 1861
- Commissioned: 30 December 1861
- Decommissioned: 1865
- Fate: Sold, 20 June 1865

General characteristics
- Tonnage: 461
- Length: 133 ft (41 m)
- Beam: 30 ft 7 in (9.32 m)
- Draft: 12 ft (3.7 m)
- Propulsion: sail
- Complement: 75
- Armament: four 8" guns

USS James L. Davis was a bark acquired by the Union Navy during the American Civil War. She was used by the Navy to patrol navigable waterways of the Confederacy to prevent the South from trading with other countries.

== Service history ==
James L. Davis (also called J. L. Davis), a wooden sailing vessel, was purchased at Philadelphia, Pennsylvania, 29 September 1861; and commissioned 30 December. The crew varied in number from forty-five to sixty-nine and the number of officers always at eleven. Most of the crew were born in the United States but there was also a sizeable number of foreign-born individuals. The average age of the crew was 26.5 and six of the regular crew were listed on the muster rolls as "mulatto, Negro, or black." Additionally, slaves who had escaped to the Union fleet were made temporary crew. Acting Volunteer Lieutenant Joseph Winn in command. James L. Davis departed Philadelphia 2 January 1862 for the Gulf of Mexico. She joined Flag Officer David Farragut's West Gulf Blockading Squadron off Pass a l'Outre 5 February but was soon transferred to the East Gulf Blockading Squadron in exchange for USS Preble. James L. Davis arrived Cedar Keys, Florida, 2 March and 8 days later captured schooner Florida attempting to slip in through the blockade with a cargo of coffee, soda ash, and other supplies already in short supply in the South. After 6 months of blockade duty on the Atlantic and Gulf coasts of Florida, the bark took English schooner Isabel attempting to dash out of St. Mark's, Florida, with a cargo of cotton in late September.

On 2 October James L. Davis interrupted her blockade duty to serve as a supply ship, carrying stores and provisions to other vessels of the squadron. The bark continued this essential work until ordered to relieve USS Ethan Allen at St. Joseph's Bay, Florida, in March 1863. She remained at this station until ordered to Key West, Florida, for repairs 15 November. At the beginning of 1864 James L. Davis was ordered to Tampa Bay where she served until fall. On 4 May 1864 she joined USS Sunflower and USS Honduras in landing Union Army troops at Tampa, Florida, and in providing men for a naval, landing party which helped to capture the town 6 May. During the operation the three ships cooperated in capturing blockade-running sloop Neptune with a cargo of cotton. In July and August, James L. Davis participated in a series of successful boat expeditions which destroyed salt works, a large saw and grist mill, and a sugar mill belonging to Jefferson Davis. James L. Davis was ordered to St. Joseph's Bay 1 September and served there until ordered to Key West for repairs 1 April 1865. The war ended while the bark was at Key West. She was ordered to Philadelphia 21 April where she was sold at public auction 20 June 1865.
