= USS Sunflower (1863) =

Gunboat of the United States Navy

History

United States
- Acquired: 2 May 1863
- Commissioned: 29 April 1863
- Decommissioned: 3 June 1865
- Fate: Sold, 10 August 1865

General characteristics
- Displacement: 294 tons
- Length: 104 ft 5 in (31.83 m)
- Beam: 20 ft 9 in (6.32 m)
- Draft: 12 ft (3.7 m)
- Propulsion: steam engine; screw propelled
- Speed: 10.5 knots (19.4 km/h; 12.1 mph)
- Armament: two 30-pounder Parrott rifles

USS Sunflower was a 294-ton steamer acquired by the Union Navy during the American Civil War.

Sunflower was used as a gunboat by the Navy to patrol navigable waterways of the Confederacy in order to prevent the South from trading with other countries.

== Service history ==
Sunflower—a screw gunboat purchased at Boston, Massachusetts, on 2 May 1863—was commissioned on 29 April 1863, Acting Master Edward Sice in command. Sunflower was assigned to the East Gulf Blockading Squadron and arrived at Key West, Florida, in mid-May 1863. On the 31st, she seized schooner Echo and a cargo of cotton off the Marquesas Keys. The gunboat captured schooner Pushmatatta off Tortugas on 13 June and schooner General Worth in the straits of Florida on 27 August. Sunflower aided USS Beauregard in seizing sloop Last Trial on 6 October. On Christmas Eve 1863, she captured blockade runner Hancock near the lighthouse at Tampa Bay with a cargo of salt and borax.

Sunflower remained on patrol during 1864 and, on 24 March, captured sloop Josephine in Sarasota Sound. Josephine was en route from Tampa, Florida, to Havana, Cuba, with a cargo of cotton when she was intercepted. Sunflower, with USS Honduras and USS James L. Davis, supported the capture of Tampa in a combined operation from 4 to 7 May. These Union ships transported Northern soldiers to Tampa and also provided naval landing parties which participated in the assault. On the 6th, the three ships captured sloop Neptune which was carrying a cargo of cotton, when she attempted to run the blockade On 2 June, Sunflower landed three armed boats to destroy salt works at Tampa Bay. The last ship to fall prey to Sunflower was Pickwick, captured off St. George's Sound on 6 December 1864. On 30 March 1865, she and USS Somerset landed an expedition at St. Joseph's Sound and destroyed salt works. Sunflower sailed to Philadelphia, Pennsylvania, and was decommissioned there on 3 June 1865. The ship was sold at auction on 10 August 1865.
