= CSS Alabama's South Pacific expeditionary raid =

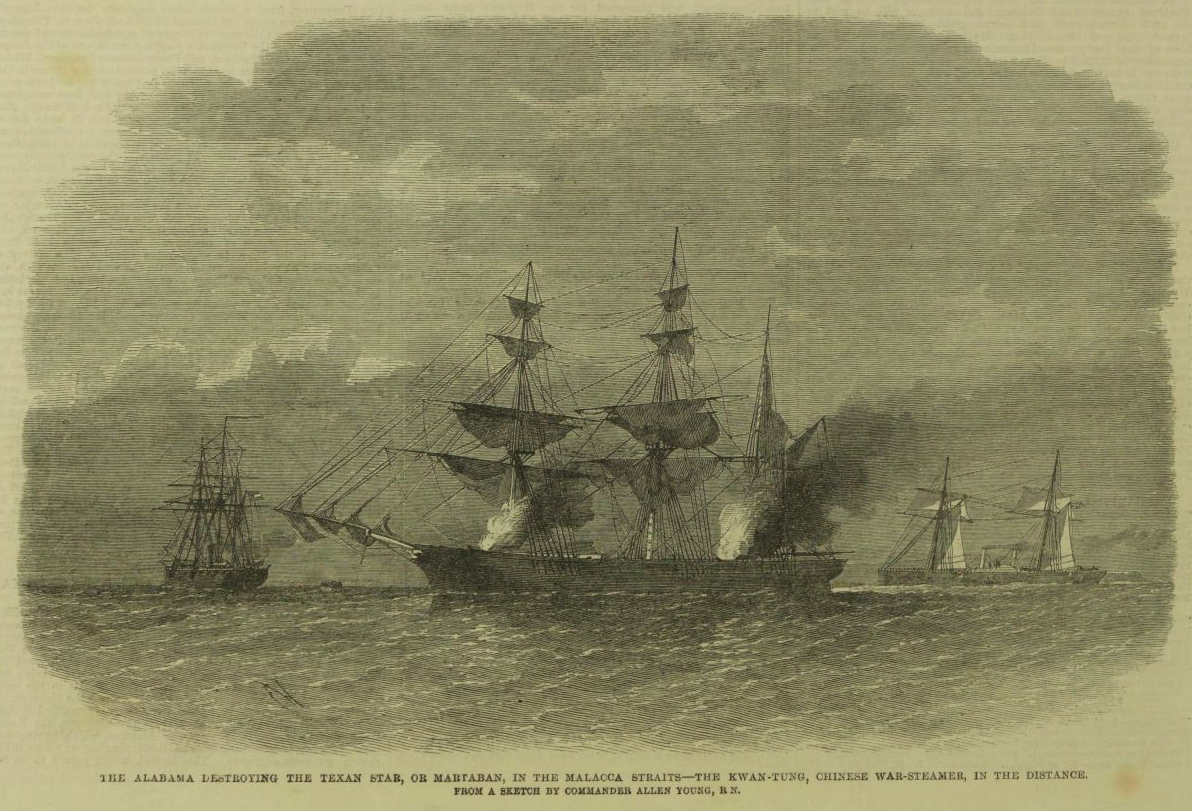
The Alabama destroying the Texan Star (alias Martaban), in the Malacca Straits; the Kwan-Tung Chinese War-Steamer in the Distance, from the Illustrated London News, 2 April 1864

CSS Alabama's South Pacific expeditionary raid commenced shortly after the Confederate States Navy ship CSS Alabama left the Karimata Strait between Borneo and Sumatra heading east into the south Pacific Ocean on the most easterly extent of her voyages. The raid lasted from the beginning of December 1863 to Christmas (December 25), when the ship's captain, Semmes, made a decision to turn west back toward Europe for a planned overhaul and refit.

The primary area of operation during this expeditionary raid, was the southern Pacific Ocean, steaming east and then turning back west toward the Strait of Malacca.

== Raid overview ==
CSS Alabama passed the Karimata Strait and reached Pulo Condore, anchoring in the western harbor north of White Rock on December 2, 1863. After a few weeks of steaming, she headed back toward Singapore, anchoring at Pulo Aor on December 19. Arriving in the Strait of Malacca on December 24, Captain Semmes overtook the English vessel Martaban before spotting Texan Star, which Alabama captured and burned. On Christmas Day, December 25, 1863, Captain Semmes put the Texan Star prisoners on Malacca Island, and proceeded to turn down invitations for Christmas dinner from British colonists.

On December 26, 1863, Alabama is at sea again and comes across two ships; Sonora of Newburyport and Highlander of Boston. Both ships are burned, and Captain Semmes discontinues his raiding, deciding to use 1864 as a time to refit and repair back in France.

== Raid bounty ==
CSS Alabama's Indian Ocean Expeditionary Raid
Date	Ship name	Tonnage	Ship type	Location	Disposition of prize
December 24, 1863	Texan Star	?	?	Strait of Malacca	Burned
December 26, 1863	Sonora	?	?	Strait of Malacca	Burned
December 26, 1863	Highlander	?	?	Strait of Malacca	Burned
