= USS Honduras =

Gunboat of the United States Navy

History

United States
- Laid down: date unknown
- Launched: 1861
- Acquired: 31 July 1863
- Commissioned: 8 September 1863
- Decommissioned: 5 August 1865
- Stricken: 1865 (est.)
- Fate: Sold, 5 September 1865

General characteristics
- Displacement: 376 tons
- Length: 150 ft (46 m)
- Beam: 27 ft (8.2 m)
- Depth of hold: 10 ft (3.0 m)
- Propulsion: steam engine; side-wheel propelled
- Speed: 12 knots
- Complement: not known
- Armament: two 12-pounder rifled guns

USS Honduras was a steamer acquired by the Union Navy during the American Civil War.

The Union Navy commissioned her as a supply ship and dispatch boat who task was to support the Navy ships blockading the Confederate States of America.

== Built in New York city in 1863 ==
Honduras, a side wheel steamer, was built in 1861 at New York City and purchased from her owner, Simeon Ackerman, 31 July 1863. Converted to Navy use, she commissioned at New York Navy Yard 8 September 1863, Acting Lieutenant T. Stites in command.

== Civil War operations ==
=== Assigned as support vessel for the East Gulf Blockade ===
Assigned as a supply boat and dispatch steamer with the East Gulf Blockading Squadron, Honduras sailed for Key West, Florida, soon after commissioning. She carried mail and dispatches, and in addition served on the blockade which so effectively strangled southern commerce and strength.

She captured British blockade-runner Mail in the Gulf of Mexico 15 October 1863, and early the next year supported a joint operation at the mouth of the Caloosahatchie River. Honduras carried troops to the mouth of the river and disembarked them 4 January 1864.

In addition to her regular dispatch duties, the steamer also participated in the capture of Tampa, Florida, by joint expedition, 4–7 May 1864. Honduras, with USS Sunflower and USS James L. Davis, carried General Woodbury and his troops to Tampa, Florida, and provided a naval landing party which joined in the assault. During the successful operation the ships also captured blockade-running sloop Neptune 6 May.

=== Problems with yellow fever sickness ===
Continuing to supply the squadron, Honduras, like many of the ships in that tropical climate, suffered from yellow fever among the crew during July 1864, and spent much of her time at Key West, Florida.

She interrupted her regular itinerary among the stations of the squadron 4 January 1865 to come to the assistance of San Jacinto, stranded on a reef in the Bahamas. Honduras helped to salvage ordnance and equippage from the stricken ship.

=== Participating in the St. Marks River expedition ===
Honduras also participated in a joint expedition to the mouth of the St. Marks River, Florida, 23 February-7 March 1865. Gunboats with troops embarked destroyed Confederate installations near the mouth of the river, and effectually blockaded it against illegal commerce.

== Post-war decommissioning and sale ==
In July 1865 Honduras was ordered to New York City, where she decommissioned 5 August. The steamer was sold 5 September 1865 to W. A. Lightfall and returned to merchant service, finally stranding off Key West, Florida, in 1870.
