= USS Fox (1859) =

Gunboat of the United States Navy

History

United States
- Name: USS Fox
- Ordered: as Alabama
- Laid down: date unknown
- Launched: 1859
- Acquired: 6 May 1863
- In service: 10 June 1863
- Out of service: 1 June 1865
- Stricken: 1865 (est.)
- Captured: by Union forces, 18 April 1863
- Fate: Sold 28 June 1865

General characteristics
- Displacement: 80 tons
- Length: not known
- Beam: not known
- Draught: 8 ft 6 in (2.59 m)
- Propulsion: sail
- Speed: varied
- Complement: not known
- Armament: one 12-poundr howitzer; one 12-pounder rifle

USS Fox was a captured Confederate schooner acquired by the Union Navy from the prize court during the American Civil War.

The Union Navy placed her into service as a ship's tender, whose task was to serve the fleet blockading the Confederate States of America. However, she was outfitted with a powerful rifled gun, which helped her in the role of gunboat and the capture of a prize on her own.

== Captured and acquired by the Union Navy ==
Fox, a schooner, was built in 1859 at Baltimore, Maryland; used as a blockade runner by the Confederates under the name Alabama; captured 18 April 1863 by Susquehanna; purchased from the prize court 6 May 1863; renamed Fox, her former merchant name; and first put to sea 10 June 1863, Acting Master A. Weston in command.

== Civil War operations ==
=== Serving as tender with the East Gulf Blockade ===
Assigned to the East Gulf Blockading Squadron, Fox sailed out of Key West, Florida, throughout the remainder of the war. Her primary duty was as tender to the ordnance ship Dale and other large ships, but in her patrols alone and with the squadron, she shared in the capture of several blockade runners sailing out of Havana, Cuba.

Sailing alone, on 20 December 1863 she discovered a side wheel steamer grounded at the mouth of the Suwannee River, and after firing on her, sent a boarding party which found the steamer's crew had fled. Finding the engine room flooded and the job of getting the steamer off beyond her limited capacity, Fox burned her to prevent her further use by the Confederates.

=== Winning prizes on her own ===
Four days later, again sailing alone, Fox encountered a British schooner from Havana in the Suwannee River, and after firing several shells, boarded her and took her prize. On 18 April 1864, Fox chased a British schooner until the schooner's crew ran her aground and abandoned her. A party from Fox boarded and burned the blockade runner. Again she took a prize singlehanded on 1 May, when she apprehended a sloop running the blockade off Cape Romano, Florida.

Her first prize in 1865, taken 23 January, was another British blockade runner out of Havana. On 12 March, Fox chased a schooner ashore in Deadman's Bay. The blockade runner's crew set her afire, but part of her cargo of cavalry sabers and farming equipment was saved from the flames by Fox's boarding party.

Several times during these years boat parties from Fox destroyed valuable salt works ashore, such expeditions combining with her captures to make hers a most significant role in the total effort to cut the Confederacy off from key supplies.

Detached from duty 1 June 1865, Fox was sold 28 June 1865.
