= List of shipwrecks in July 1854 =

The list of shipwrecks in July 1854 includes ships sunk, wrecked, grounded, or otherwise lost during July 1854.

== 1 July ==
List of shipwrecks: 1 July 1854
Ship	State	Description
Coromandel	United Kingdom	The schooner was driven ashore in Landillo Bay. She was on a voyage from Liverpool, Lancashire to Dublin. She was refloated and put back to Liverpool in a leaky condition.

== 2 July ==
List of shipwrecks: 2 July 1854
Ship	State	Description
Emma	United Kingdom	The ship ran aground on Hamilton's Bank, in the Solent. She was on a voyage from Portsmouth to Spithead, Hampshire. She was refloated.
Louisa	(United Kingdom of Great Britain and Ireland) British North America	The schooner sprang a leak and was abandoned in the Atlantic Ocean 6 nautical miles (11 km) south of Grand Manan. Her crew were rescued. She was on a voyage from Boston, Massachusetts, United States to Saint John, New Brunswick. She was subsequently towed in to Gouldsboro, Maine, United States.

== 3 July ==
List of shipwrecks: 3 July 1854
Ship	State	Description
Blakistone	United Kingdom	The schooner collided with the brig Silence (United Kingdom) Silence and sank in the River Thames at Woolwich, Kent.
Grimeneza	Peru	The ship was wrecked on a shoal off New Caledonia (10°50′S 161°30′E) with the loss of nearly 640 lives. Nineteen crew took to a boat and were subsequently rescued. Another six crew in a boat reached New Ireland on 28 July. One of them was subsequently murdered by the local inhabitants. The five survivors were rescued on 5 September by the whaler Australia (United Kingdom). Grimeneza was on a voyage from China to Callao.

== 4 July ==
List of shipwrecks: 4 July 1854
Ship	State	Description
Veronica	United Kingdom	The ship was wrecked at Gibraltar.

== 5 July ==
List of shipwrecks: 5 July 1854
Ship	State	Description
Cecilie, and Libau, Lisbon or Pericles	Denmark; France	The brig Cecilie was in collision with the steamship Libau 30 nautical miles (56 km) off Málaga, Spain. Both vessels sank; their crews were rescued by the lugger Maria (France). Cecilie was on a voyage from Marseille, Bouches-du-Rhône, France to Falmouth, Cornwall, United Kingdom. Libau was on a voyage from Bordeaux, Gironde to Constantinople, Ottoman Empire.
Janet	United Kingdom	The ship was driven ashore and wrecked in the Gut of Canso. She was on a voyage from Liverpool, Lancashire to Arichat and Pugwash, Nova Scotia, British North America.
Market Maid	United Kingdom	The ship sprang a leak and sank off Baggy Point, Devon. Her crew were rescued. She was on a voyage from Bridgwater, Somerset to Barnstaple, Devon.

== 6 July ==
List of shipwrecks: 6 July 1854
Ship	State	Description
Antarctic	United Kingdom	The ship ran aground on the Beaufort Shoals, in the Saint Lawrence River. She was on a voyage from Quebec City, Province of Canada, British North America to Liverpool, Lancashire.
Bengt	Sweden	The schooner sprang a leak in the North Sea. She was on a voyage from Gothenburg to Honfleur, Manche, France. She was towed in to Scarborough Yorkshire in a waterlogged condition.
Duguesclin	French Navy	Crimean War: The Suffren-class ship of the line ran aground on the Warren Rock, off Kronstadt, Russia. She was later refloated.

== 8 July ==
List of shipwrecks: 8 July 1854
Ship	State	Description
Elizabeth and Jane	United Kingdom	The ship was abandoned in the North Sea off Robin Hood's Bay, Yorkshire. Her crew were rescued by Samuel (United Kingdom). Elizabeth and Jane was on a voyage from Sunderland, County Durham to Ipswich, Suffolk.
Thomas and Ann	United Kingdom	The ship ran aground and sank at West Hartlepool, County Durham. She was on a voyage from Inverkeithing, Fife to West Hartlepool.

== 9 July ==
List of shipwrecks: 9 July 1854
Ship	State	Description
Atlas	United Kingdom	The schooner was wrecked on Middle Mouse, Anglesey.
Hero	United Kingdom	The ship foundered in the Atlantic Ocean 50 nautical miles (93 km) off Fernando Po, Portuguese Guinea. Her crew were rescued. She was on a voyage from Bonny to Liverpool, Lancashire.
William the Conqueror	United Kingdom	The ship was destroyed by fire in the Atlantic Ocean. Her crew took to the boats; they were rescued by Precursor (United Kingdom). William the Conqueror was on a voyage from Barbados to London.

== 10 July ==
List of shipwrecks: 10 July 1854
Ship	State	Description
Robinson	United Kingdom	The brig was holed by an anchor and sank at Montreal, Province of Canada, British North America. She was on a voyage from Montreal to Liverpool, Lancashire.

== 11 July ==
List of shipwrecks: 11 July 1854
Ship	State	Description
Archimedes	Kingdom of Sardinia	The brig ran aground on the Goodwin Sands, Kent, United Kingdom. She was on a voyage from Genoa to Middlesbrough, Yorkshire, United Kingdom.
Eleventh of April	Norway	The ship foundered in the Atlantic Ocean. Her crew were rescued by the schooner Hannibal (United Kingdom). Eleventh of April was on a voyage from Cette, Hérault, France to Bergen.
Hero	United Kingdom	The ship foundered 50 nautical miles (93 km) off Fernando Po, Spanish Guinea. Her crew were rescued. She was on a voyage from Bonny to Liverpool, Lancashire.

== 12 July ==
List of shipwrecks: 12 July 1854
Ship	State	Description
Louisa	United Kingdom	The barque ran aground at Berbice, British Honduras. she was on a voyage from the Clyde to Demerara, British Honduras.

== 13 July ==
List of shipwrecks: 13 July 1854
Ship	State	Description
Alessandro	Kingdom of Sardinia	The full-rigged ship was driven ashore and capsized at Genoa. She was on a voyage from Genoa to Marseille, Bouches-du-Rhône and California, United States.
Catherine	United Kingdom	The brig was driven ashore and wrecked at Montevideo, Uruguay.
Cumberland	United Kingdom	Crimean War: The ship was sunk as a target off Landguard Fort, Harwich, Essex by artillery fire from the East Suffolk Regiment.
Silas Richards	United States	The ship was driven ashore by ice and wrecked near Cape Bersen'yeva in Tugur Bay in the western Sea of Okhotsk. The vessel’s cargo of whale oil and whalebone were saved by the ship Hibernia 2nd (United States).

== 15 July ==
List of shipwrecks: 15 July 1854
Ship	State	Description
Canopus	United Kingdom	The barque was driven ashore in Table Bay. She had been refloated by 9 August.
Prince Rupert	United Kingdom	The barque was wrecked on the Caicos Reef. She was on a voyage from Annatto Bay, Jamaica to London.
Sea Gull, and Wild Sea Mew	United Kingdom	The ships were in collision and were then driven ashore in Table Bay. All on board were rescued.

== 16 July ==
List of shipwrecks: 16 July 1854
Ship	State	Description
Archibald	United Kingdom	The brig was abandoned in the Atlantic Ocean (45°00′N 41°50′W). Her nine crew were rescued by Cotton Planter (United States). Archibald was on a voyage from Sunderland, County Durham to Quebec City, Province of Canada, British North America.
Saxon	United Kingdom	The barque ran aground on the Kish Bank, in the Irish Sea. She was on a voyage from Liverpool, Lancashire to Demerara, British Guiana. She put in to Kingstown, County Dublin in a leaky condition.

== 17 July ==
List of shipwrecks: 17 July 1854
Ship	State	Description
Franklin	United States	The steamship was wrecked at Moriches, New York. All 160 passengers on board, and her crew, were rescued. She was on a voyage from Havre de Grâce, Seine-Inférieure, France to New York City.

== 19 July ==
List of shipwrecks: 19 July 1854
Ship	State	Description
Dolphin	United Kingdom	The schooner was driven ashore east of Gibraltar.

== 20 July ==
List of shipwrecks: 20 July 1854
Ship	State	Description
Victoria	United Kingdom	The steamboat suffered a boiler explosion in the River Ribble, killing five people. She was on a voyage from Lytham St. Annes to Preston, Lancashire.

== 21 July ==
List of shipwrecks: 21 July 1854
Ship	State	Description
Herder	Bremen	The ship was damaged by fire in King George's Sound. She was on a voyage from Bremen to Sydney, New South Wales.
James Clark	United Kingdom	The schooner was driven ashore in Sinclair's Bay. She was on a voyage from Liverpool, Lancashire to Helmsdale, Sutherland. She was refloated on 11 August and taken in to Wick, Caithness in a severely damaged condition.
Sophia Moffatt	United Kingdom	The ship was destroyed by fire in the Atlantic Ocean 142 nautical miles (263 km) off Saint-Louis, Senegal. Her 28 crew were rescued. She was on a voyage from London to Singapore, Straits Settlements.

== 22 July ==
List of shipwrecks: 22 July 1854
Ship	State	Description
Duperré	French Navy	Crimean War: The Téméraire-class ship of the line ran aground in Åland, Grand Duchy of Finland. She was refloated with the assistance of HMS Driver and HMS Hecla (both Royal Navy).

== 23 July ==
List of shipwrecks: 23 July 1854
Ship	State	Description
Armide	United Kingdom	The ship was abandoned and sank 100 nautical miles (190 km) off Penang, Straits Settlements. Her 26 crew survived. She was on a voyage from Coringa, India to London.
Humber	United Kingdom	The steamship was driven ashore in the River Swine, Prussia. She was on a voyage from Stettin to Hull, Yorkshire. She was refloated the next day.
HMS Valorous	United Kingdom	Crimean War: The Magicienne-class frigate ran aground in Åland, Grand Duchy of Finland and was severely damaged.

== 24 July ==
List of shipwrecks: 24 July 1854
Ship	State	Description
Auguste	United Kingdom	The brig was wrecked on the Jedore Bank, off the coast of Nova Scotia, British North America.
Island Queen	China	The schooner was lost in the Coral Sea off the Great Detached Reef, Cape York, New South Wales, while en route to Hong Kong from Melbourne, Victoria.
Ottawa	(United Kingdom of Great Britain and Ireland) British North America	The ship ran aground in the Saint Lawrence River. She was on a voyage from Montreal, Province of Canada to Liverpool, Lancashire.

== 25 July ==
List of shipwrecks: 25 July 1854
Ship	State	Description
Ambassadress	United Kingdom	The ship was wrecked on the Geol Rock, off Brier Island, Nova Scotia, British North America. She was on a voyage from Alexandria, Virginia, United States to Saint John, New Brunswick, British North America.
Breeze	United Kingdom	The ship collided with Lapwing (Hamburg) and sank off Falsterbo, Sweden. Her crew were rescued by Lapwing. Breeze was on a voyage from Königsberg, Prussia to an English port.

== 26 July ==
List of shipwrecks: 26 July 1854
Ship	State	Description
Fatima	United Kingdom	The ship was wrecked on a reef in the Torres Straits (11°47′S 144°01′E). Her crew took to the boats. They were rescued on 5 July by Bato (Netherlands). Fatima was on a voyage from Melbourne, Victoria to Batavia, Netherlands East Indies.
Mary Ann	United Kingdom	The ship ran aground off Helsingør, Denmark. She was on a voyage from Danzig to London. She was refloated the next day.

== 27 July ==
For the beaching of Charles Humberston on this date, see the entry for 3 March 1854

List of shipwrecks: 27 July 1854
Ship	State	Description
Admiral	United States	The steamship ran aground 3 nautical miles (5.6 km) off the West Quoddy Head Lighthouse, Maine and was damaged. She was beached and sank. Her 300 passengers, and her crew, were rescued.
Squaw	United Kingdom	The ship ran aground at Newcastle, New South Wales.

== 28 July ==
List of shipwrecks: 28 July 1854
Ship	State	Description
Bertha	United Kingdom	The ship ran aground in the Black Sea. She was on a voyage from Newcastle upon Tyne, Northumberland to Kertch, Russia.

== 29 July ==
List of shipwrecks: 29 July 1854
Ship	State	Description
Otto and Eduard	Hamburg	The ship was wrecked on the Kleinvagee Sand. Her crew were rescued. She was on a voyage from Hartlepool, county Durham, United Kingdom to Hamburg.
Wellington	United Kingdom	The barque was driven ashore and wrecked at "Sanguin", Liberia. Her crew were rescued. She was on a voyage from London to Hobart, Van Diemen's Land.

== 30 July ==
List of shipwrecks: 30 July 1854
Ship	State	Description
Nileus	United Kingdom	The ship struck the quayside at Southampton, Hampshire and was severely damaged. She was on a voyage from London to Southampton.

== 31 July ==
List of shipwrecks: 31 July 1854
Ship	State	Description
Christo	United States	The ship was wrecked near Port Natal, Cape Colony. Her crew were rescued.
NRP Duque de Saldanha	Portuguese Navy	The government steamer was stranded on a sandbank south of Aveiro, Portugal, while en route to Porto, Portugal, from Madeira with troops, and then broke up. All on board were saved.
Hart	United States	The ship was driven ashore and wrecked at Monrovia, Liberia. Her crew were rescued.

== Unknown date ==
List of shipwrecks: Unknown date in July 1854
Ship	State	Description
Andrew	United Kingdom	The ship was wrecked at Runcorn, Cheshire before 12 July.
Betsey	United Kingdom	The brig was abandoned in the North Sea. She was taken in to North Ronaldsay, Orkney Islands on 28 July in a derelict and waterlogged condition.
Britannia	United Kingdom	The ship was driven ashore on Anticosti Island, Province of Canada, British North America.
Cupid	United Kingdom	The ship was lost at Cochin, India before 6 July.
Favourite	United Kingdom	The ship was driven ashore on Anticosti Island.
Fortuna	(United Kingdom of Great Britain and Ireland) British North America	The ship was abandoned in the Atlantic Ocean. She was on a voyage from Tatamagouche, Nova Scotia to Liverpool. She was subsequently towed in to Port Hood, Nova Scotia by an American fishing vessel.
Frederica	Flag unknown	The brig was abandoned in the Atlantic Ocean before 2 July.
Johanna	Denmark	The brigantine foundered in the Atlantic Ocean. Her crew survived. She was on a voyage from the Cotinguiba River to Falmouth, Cornwall, United Kingdom.
Nimrod	(United Kingdom of Great Britain and Ireland) Van Diemen's Land	The ship was wrecked in the Horne Islands.
Premare	United States	The full-rigged ship was driven ashore on Anticosti Island. She was refloated and resumed her voyage in a leaky condition.
Saint Louis	French Navy	The Suffren-class ship of the line ran aground at Kiel, Prussia. She was refloated on 26 July.
Sapphire	United Kingdom	The ship was driven ashore on the coast of New South Wales.
Veronica	United Kingdom	The schooner was wrecked at Larache, Morocco before 4 July. Her crew were rescued.
W. M. Rogers	United States	The barque was in collision with the barque Princess Alice (United Kingdom) and sank in the Atlantic Ocean. Her crew were rescued. She was on a voyage from Sydney, Nova Scotia to Boston, Massachusetts.
Zingaree	United States	The barque was abandoned in the Java Sea before 6 July. She was on a voyage from Batavia, Netherlands East Indies to Singapore, Straits Settlements.
