= Tugur =

Tugur may refer to:

- Tugur (Khabarovsk Krai), a village in Khabarovsk Krai, Russian Far East
- Tugur Bay, a Bay in Khabarovsk Krai, Russian Far East
- Tugur (river), a river in Khabarovsk Krai, Russian Far East

== See also ==
- Tukur, a village in North Khorasan Province, Iran
