= Whaling in Russia =

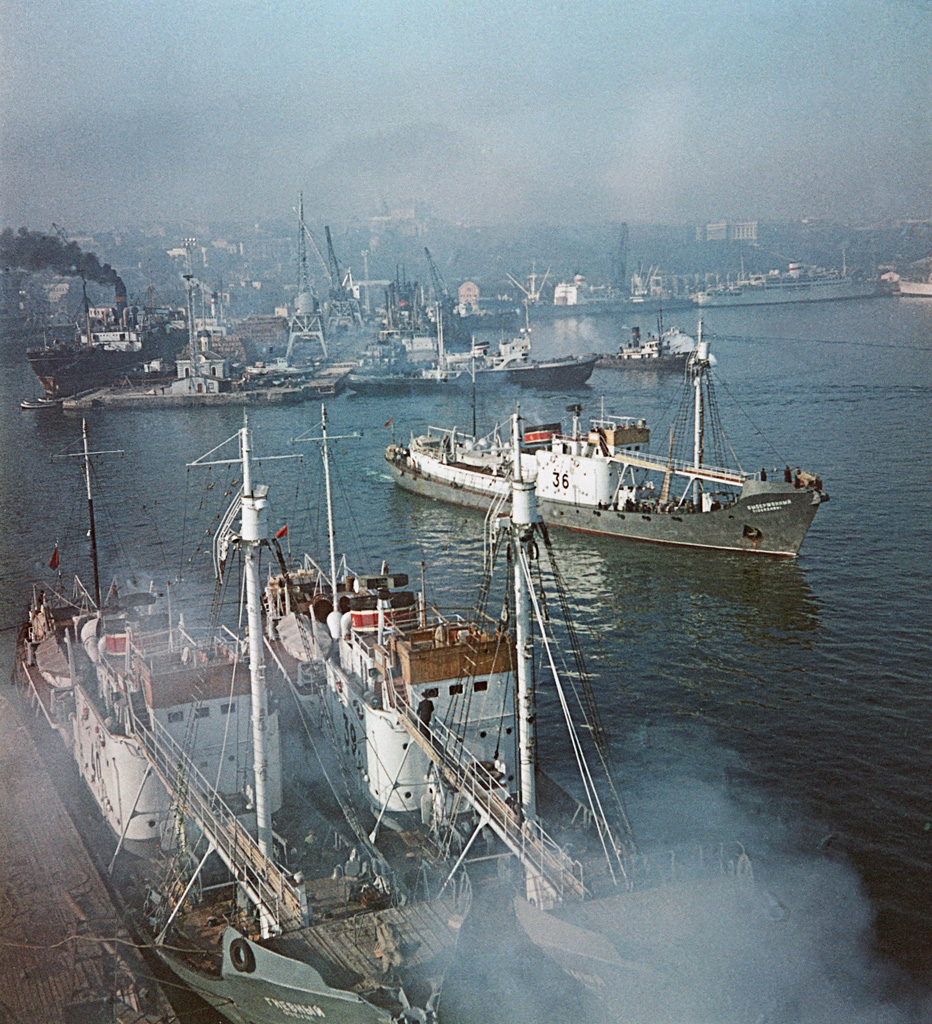
Ships of the Sovetskaya Ukraina factory fleet tying up at the port of Odessa during the 1959–1960 whaling season

Whaling in Russia has been conducted in the Chukotka region of Siberia for at least 4,000 years and has traditionally been undertaken by the native Yupik and Chukchi people. However, commercial whaling did not begin until the mid-19th century, when companies based in Finland sent vessels to the Pacific Ocean. It was not until 1932 that modern pelagic whaling began with the purchase of an American cargo ship, which was renamed the Aleut. This remained the only Soviet factory ship until World War II. After the war, with the need for a stronger Soviet economy and rapid industrialization of the country during the 1940s and 50s, Soviet whaling dramatically improved and became a global industry.

The first Soviet whalers reached the Antarctic during the 1946–47 season with the factory ship Slava, undergoing a rapid expansion during the late 1950s where five new fleets were added within a four years: Sovetskaya Ukraina in 1959, Yuriy Dolgorukiy in 1960, and Sovetskaya Rossiya in 1961 for the Antarctic, and finally two large fleets (Dalniy Vostok and Vladivostok) in 1963 for the North Pacific. By the early 1960s, Soviet whaling was operating globally in every ocean except the North Atlantic and undertaking voyages that could last as long as seven months each. From 1964 to 1973, the Soviet Union was considered by some as the biggest whaling nation in the world.

Due to implementation of the International Whaling Commission's International Observer Scheme in 1973, and the subsequent catching limits on most species of whales the same year, Soviet whaling began declining during this period. From 1978 to 1980, all fleet except for one were retired, largely due to the outlawing of all pelagic whaling except for minke whales in the Antarctic, as well as the intervention of anti-whaling groups (the Dalniy Vostok fleet was the first ever to be harassed through direct action by anti-whaling groups in 1975). After 1980, only the Sovetskaya Ukraina fleet remained, taking only minke whales in Antarctic waters. Despite strong efforts by the Soviet government to provide adequate funding for the fleet, the international moratorium on whaling issued by the IWC in 1982, combined with the high cost of maintaining this fleet, caused all Soviet whaling to end after the 1986–1987 whaling season; the USSR abolished whaling on 22 May of that year. Currently, whaling in Russia is practiced solely by the Chukotka people of the Russian Far East, who take 136 gray whales yearly on an annual quota provided by the IWC, in addition to the average catch rate of one bowhead whale per year.

In 1993, Alexey Yablokov, a former scientist on board the Soviet whaling fleets and an advisor to Russian president Boris Yeltsin on ecology and health, revealed that the USSR had committed mass falsifications of its whaling data during the period 1948–1973 and had killed nearly 180,000 more whales than reported, mostly because such catches comprised protected species or ignored quotas or regulations regarding legal size, females with calves, or catching outside legal hunting areas. The falsified data was somewhat corrected in the late 1990s, but not until the late 2000s was the full, corrected data for both the Antarctic and North Pacific regions revealed (the North Pacific data was almost entirely unknown until this time). According to Charles Homans, a writer for Pacific Standard magazine, the Soviet whaling program represented "the most senseless environmental crime of the 20th century."

== History ==
=== Aboriginal whaling ===
The first records of aboriginal whaling in the Russian Far East region of Chukotka date back at least 4,000 years, when Eskimo hunters from Alaska crossed the Bering Strait region to the Chukotka region of far northeastern Asia. The prime target of these early whalers was primarily the bowhead whale, because it provided spoil-resistant meat in huge quantities, enough to keep an entire village fed over the course of a long, harsh winter. Gray whales were also taken in some quantity, though not nearly as much as they are currently taken. The hunters used small kayak-like boats (Umiaks) and harpooned the whales with bone or wooden harpoons attached to sealskin floats, to ensure the position of the whale could be tracked. Once the whale tired, it was struck with a lance (usually made of antler) and killed. After being towed to shore, it was cut up by the villagers and shared according to how much everyone contributed to the hunt, though everyone in the village would receive a portion. Whale bones were used to frame shelters and boat rafters due to their strength and durability. The gray whale was initially not much sought after due to its smaller size and meat – which rotted faster in the Arctic climate than the bowhead whale – but this would change in the Soviet era.

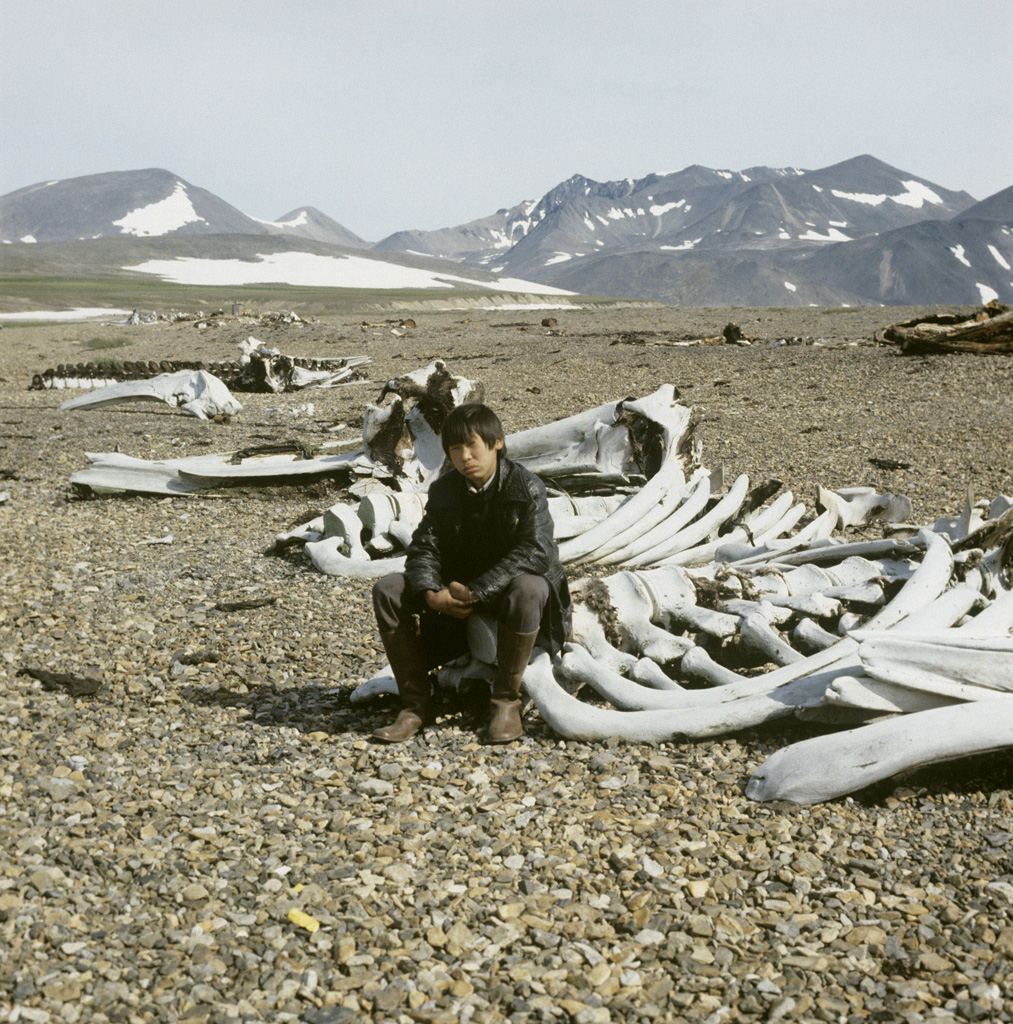
Whale bones on the shores of Chukotka in the 1980s

During the Soviet era, especially after World War II, Chukotka natives were provided with modern equipment to process the whales, including a modern catcher ship. Zevezdny, which boosted the catch from no more than 30 to around 130 to 200 whales per year, remained the norm for the rest of the Soviet era.

Not every whale taken was used for subsistence. Captain Paul Watson of Sea Shepherd Conservation Society launched an expedition into Loren in Chukotka in 1981 and found that many of the whales killed in the "subsistence hunt" were actually used for mink food and were being processed by non-aboriginal Russians. The number killed for this purpose is unknown, but it may have amounted to most or perhaps all of the catch during peak years.

Today, indigenous whalers of the Chukotka Peninsula take an average of 120 gray whales per year, slightly less than in the Soviet era, with modern weapons and wooden boats. A few bowheads are also taken incidentally. The catch level is estimated to pose minimal threat to the survival of both the gray and bowhead whale populations. Since 2022, there has been a complete ban on industrial and coastal whale fishing throughout the Russian Federation.

=== Open-boat whaling ===
In 1850, the Russo-Finnish Whaling Company was established. It fitted out five whaleships (the Suomi, Turku, Ayan, Grafer Berg, and Amur). They were sent to the North Pacific, where they mainly operated in the Sea of Okhotsk, with some operations in the Sea of Japan and Gulf of Alaska. The company did well its first two years, but one of its ships was destroyed during the Crimean War. It ceased operations in 1863. A second company, based in Helsingfors, sent out the brig Storfursten Constantin (1857–1861), which also cruised in the Sea of Okhotsk and off Baja California.

In the 1860s, two whaling stations were built in Tugur Bay in the western Sea of Okhotsk. The first was built by the Russian-American Company in 1862 in Mamga Bay. With two schooners, it caught whales from 1863 to 1865. It sold its station to Otto Wilhelm Lindholm, who had built another station at Tugur in the southern part of Tugur Bay in 1863. He soon abandoned the latter station, using the one at Mamga until the mid-1870s.

=== Modern whaling ===
Akim Grigorevitch Dydymov was the first to utilize modern methods in Russia. He had a catcher ship built in Norway and a whaling station built near Vladivostok. The first whale was caught in November 1889, and by the end of 1890 they had taken seventy-three. The catcher ship was then lost with all hands. Heinrich Hugovitch Kejzerling bought Dydymov's station and, using two Norwegian-built catcher ships, an average of 110 whales a year were caught between 1895 and 1903. In 1903 he converted a secondhand steamer into a floating factory ship, which processed ninety-eight whales that year. At the outbreak of the Russo-Japanese War the following year the factory ship, catchers, and crew were captured by the Japanese.

==== Soviet whaling: 1932–1946 ====
The decision by the Soviet government to initiate commercial whaling was made in the early 1930s, during Joseph Stalin's mass industrialization as part of the new series of Five-Year Plans. To start it off, an American cargo ship named Glen Ridge (11,000 tons) was purchased by a Kamchatka-based stock company and converted into a factory ship named Aleut throughout 1931 and the first half of 1932. In July 1932, with the conversion complete, the ship and its catcher ships started their maiden voyage to their home port of Vladivostok. Realizing they would not make it home in time for the whaling season (which by that time was already half-over) they instead decided to undertake "test whaling" off the Revillagigedo Islands, and during the journey from the Revillagigedos to Hawaii they killed 21 whales. The first full whaling season began in 1933, and the first whale killed, a sperm whale, was taken on May 28, 1933. Most of the whaling in the pre-war days took place around Kamchatka Peninsula, the Kuril Islands, the Sea of Okhotsk, the Chukchi Sea, and the Bering Sea. Before WWII, the annual catch of whales from the Aleut fleet rarely exceeded 1,000; however, such kills did indeed need to meet annual production targets, and a failure to meet the goals for the Second Five-Year Plan led to Captain A. Dudnik (who ironically had been awarded the Order of Lenin only a year before for his performance as captain) being sacked from his position in 1937 and wrongly arrested on charges of being a Japanese agent trying to sell the fleet to Japan.

After the war, an expansion of the North Pacific whaling fleet was undertaken with the purchase of several American-built minesweepers from the war, which were converted into catchers and worked out of several of the Kuril Islands, utilizing old whaling stations built by the Japanese during the period of Japanese rule over the islands. Like the Aleut fleet, the catchers out of the Kuril stations were relatively modest in comparison with whaling that would take place later on; however, the catcher boats were extremely effective at catching whales, so much so that the whale stocks were quickly depleted. Soviet scientist B. Zenkovitch commented as early as 1951 on the decline of whale stocks around the Kurils. In 1955, prominent Soviet whale biologist S.K. Klumov wrote to the central fisheries ministry complaining of how the Five-Year Plan quotas were not reflective of the actual state of the whale stocks around the Kurils, and suggested a more rational approach to whaling, saying Plan quotas should reflect the condition of the whale stocks and not raw domestic production, but unfortunately his concerns were ignored. Indeed, towards the end of the 1950s the Kuril land stations (and to a great extent the Aleut as well) began increasingly taking under-sized whales, especially sperm whales, because of a great desire to meet production targets, despite rapidly depleting the area of whales. By the end of their operating periods, the majority of the catches in the Kurils region consisted of undersized whales. The first shore station to close was the Shikotan Island station in 1955, and shortly after the stations on Iturup Island were closed as well. The northernmost station, on Paramushir Island, was the last station to close; it closed in 1964. The Aleut fleet continued operating until 1967, when it was finally retired after 35 years of service.

==== Antarctic whaling and rapid expansion (1946–1963) ====
The destruction of many of the USSR's resources after WWII, but perhaps more importantly its desire to become an industrial giant to overtake and surpass its Western adversaries during the Cold War, caused the Soviets to consider a rapid expansion of natural resource harvesting, with special interest paid to the whaling industry. A former German factory ship, named Wikinger (Viking) was given to the Soviets as a prize of war and renamed Slava (glory) and first whaled in the Antarctic during the 1946–47 season from its base in Odessa on the Black Sea, and during this first season killed 384 whales. In the next season, 1947–48, a new captain, Alexei Solyanik, was hired to command the fleet, and for the next 18 seasons he would command Slava and later the Sovetskaya Ukraina, becoming the most successful whaling captain in Soviet history. For the first two seasons, Slava had Norwegian crew members on board to assist with the capture and processing of whales (the Soviets were initially very inexperienced with Antarctic whaling and needed help getting used to the basics) but starting in the 1948–49 season, having mastered all the fundamentals of whaling, crew members on the Slava fleet were all Soviet citizens. The fleet primarily worked the Southeast Atlantic Ocean and the southwest Indian Ocean in its early years, but over time it slowly shifted east as whale populations in the Atlantic-Indian area were depleted. During this time, catches rose significantly from 384 in the 1946–47 season to almost 3,000 in the 1951–52 season, and during this time falsification of catches began: in the 1951–52 season, the fleet killed 950 humpback whales and reported only 8; many blue and southern right whales were killed during this time and went unreported as well. Large scale whaling began in the 1957–58 season, when the Slava fleet penetrated the waters off Australia for the first time, killing 2,200 humpbacks alone during this season. In 1958–59, the fleet killed more than 4,000, and did not report most of its catch. As the limit on humpbacks at the time was only 1,250 per season (or a limit of only four days to hunt humpbacks) the whalers needed to conceal most of their catch to avoid ramifications during the annual meetings of the IWC.

In 1959, the Soviets began a massive expansion of their whaling industry, probably due to their desire to become a larger player in the global whale products market (and because the Seventh Five-Year Plan called for greater reliance on natural resources). In November 1959 the Sovetskaya Ukraina, the first of these new ships (and at almost 50,000 tons the largest factory ship ever built along with its sister ship) left Odessa to begin Antarctic whaling, followed soon after by the Slava. In October 1960 a converted passenger liner named Yuriy Dolgorukiy set sail from Kaliningrad to join the others, and in autumn 1961, Sovetskaya Rossiya set sail from Vladivostok to the Antarctic. Now possessing the largest whaling fleet in the world, the Soviets could truly claim to be one of the world's great whaling nations at this point.

In the first years of their operations, this new fleet mostly concentrated in the Southwest Pacific sector of the Antarctic and focused primarily on humpback whales, with the Slava and Sovetskaya Ukraina fleets alone taking 25,000 humpbacks in Antarctic waters during 1959–60 and 1960–61. The Yuriy Dolgorukiy and Sovetskaya Rossiya fleets, while not nearly catching as much in subsequent seasons due to depletions caused by the first two fleets, did nevertheless "finish the job" by killing some 3,500 and 1,700 humpbacks in their first seasons, respectively. In 1962, after all fleets had joined in whaling, the area of the Antarctic south of Australia and New Zealand, which was once filled with humpbacks, was described as a "desert" by some of the factory ship crew. This five-year period (1957–58 to 1961–62) saw the four fleets kill over 37,000 humpbacks in the Antarctic. Catches were so high, in fact, that shore stations in Australia and New Zealand closed in 1963 and 1964 due to the lack of whales.

==== Golden age: 1964–1973 ====
While the period 1959–62 saw the greatest catches of humpbacks, and the greatest catch of whales overall in 1963–64, the entire age spanning from 1955 to 1973 can be considered the peak of Soviet whaling, due to the lack of enforcement which allowed such massive illegal catches and the relatively high abundance of whales still remaining in the Antarctic, of which few were reported. Catches of humpbacks were much less after 1962 but still continued to contribute to the industry, the last of which were caught in 1972–73. Blue whales, which were already depleted by earlier whaling, suffered miserably at the hands of Soviet whalers; over 900 true blue and 10,000 pygmy blue whales (a smaller subspecies of the true Antarctic blue) were killed illegally by Soviet whaling (in the 1964-65 whaling season over 1,800 blues, most of them pygmy, were taken by the Ukraina fleet alone), and by 1973–74 true blues in the Antarctic numbered a mere 350 individuals. After blue, humpback and southern right (the USSR took 3,368 southern rights and reported only 4) whales were depleted, the shift began to sei whales. While seis at the time were still largely intact due to being smaller and less valuable than blue and fin whales, commercial whaling beginning in 1962–63 was intense. Catches of sei whales continued to climb until 1966–67, when 3,500 were killed by the three Soviet fleets, particularly Sovetskaya Rossiya. They were caught in fairly good numbers until protected in 1978. Fin whales, despite still being relatively plentiful when the Soviets began whaling, were not caught in extremely large numbers. In fact, the fin whale was the only major species taken by the Soviets that was actually over-reported to cover up for catches of protected species. Nevertheless, particularly in the early 60s, fins were killed in large numbers, with the maximum kill in 1961–62 numbering over 4,000.

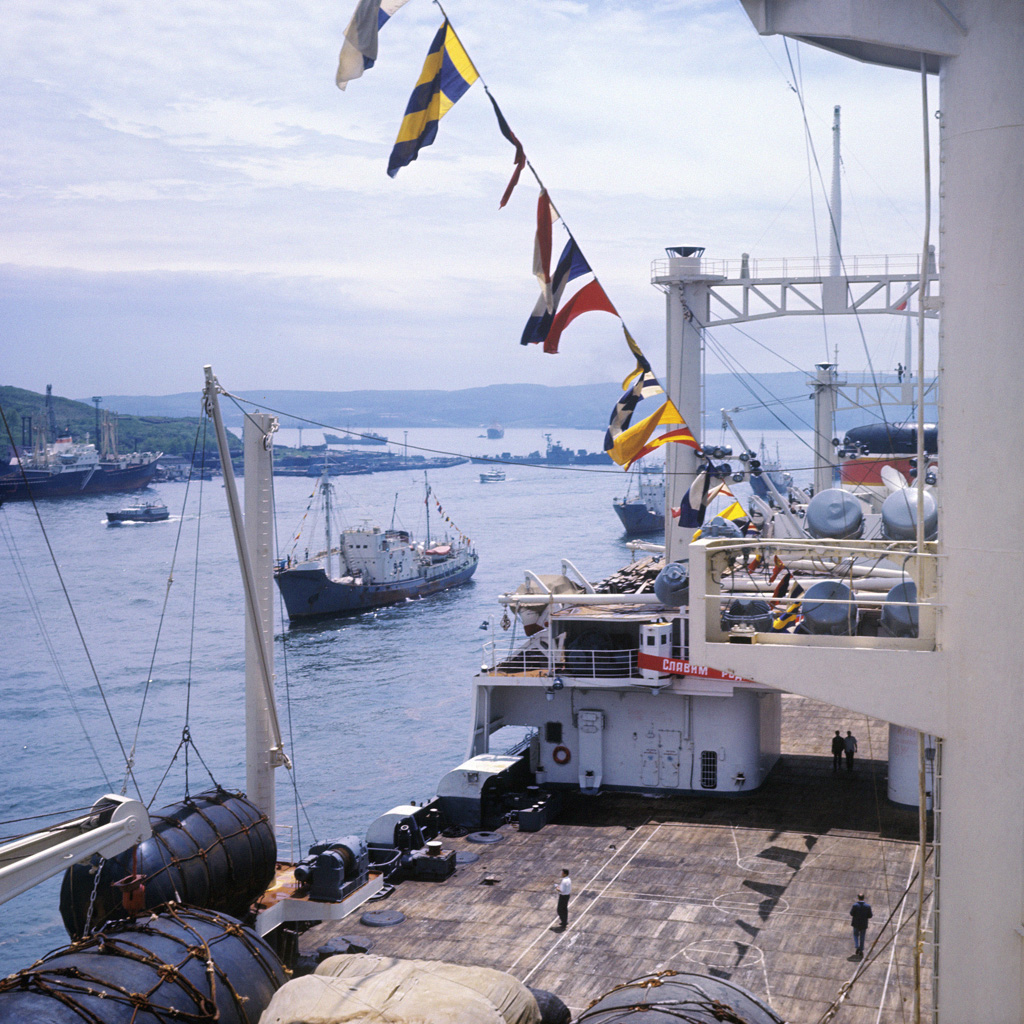
Sovetskaya Rossiya fleet returning to Vladivostok after the 1968–69 Antarctic season

During their journey to and from the Antarctic, Soviet fleets had a habit of stopping in the tropics to hunt whales, which was entirely illegal (despite a small number of sperm whales permissible north of the Antarctic). The tropical Indian Ocean was particularly hard hit by southbound Soviet whalers, and during the season 1966–67 the non-migratory Arabian humpback population and populations of pygmy blue whales in the northern Indian Ocean were decimated by the Sovetskaya Ukraina fleet. Yuri Mikhalev, a biologist working on the Ukraina fleet starting from the 1964–65 season, also reported large numbers of Bryde's whales being in the catch, which in fact was what made him realize the killing was illegal in the first place. He witnessed firsthand the wholesale destruction of the whale stocks:

Sovetskaya Ukraina had more catchers than any other factory ship—twenty-five. All the catchers would fan out into a long line, so that each boat was just within sight of the one on either side of it. When you saw the catcher next to you stopped, you knew that they had found whales. When that happened, everyone would converge on the spot, kill every animal in the area, then move on.

Primarily, however, the fleets relied on sperm whales during their hunts in tropical waters, although sperms, primarily males, were taken in large numbers in the Antarctic hunts as well. During later years, from 1972–73 onward, increasing numbers of lactating females with young were taken. In fact, during the end of the 1972–73 season, the catch of lactating females with young was 45% of the catch. The more destructive periods of Soviet whaling generally were accompanied by the taking of large numbers of females with calves (despite mothers with calves being protected by IWC regulations) and such practices caused sperm whale populations in the southern hemisphere to collapse over just a few years from 1965 to 1980. As the scientific report of the Rossiya fleet noted for the 1973–1974 season,

"The sperm whale's breeding areas have become the areas of its elimination..."

By 1980, few profitable whaling grounds were left in the entire southern hemisphere, and only one fleet was left to work the Antarctic after 1980, the Ukraina fleet which took only Antarctic minke whales until it finally ceased whaling in 1987. Typical catches of minkes usually numbered about 3000 a year, though some were underreported.

==== North Pacific whaling ====
Large-scale Soviet whaling in the North Pacific Ocean did not begin until 1963 with the launching of the Dalniy Vostok and Vladivostok fleets, but it was no less intense than in the Antarctic. In its last years of operations, the ageing Aleut fleet caught over 1,200 humpback whales in the Gulf of Alaska and Bristol Bay, while the two large pelagic fleets killed over 2,800 humpbacks around the Aleutian Islands in the early 1960s, decimating the population to levels from which it has only recently recovered. Blue whales and fin whales suffered too, and hundreds of them were taken from 1963 to 1971 and almost none reported. The last major kill of blue whales was in 1964 when 170 were taken; fin whales, 2,500 that same year and none after 1974.

By far the most egregious were the right whales. As all species of right whales had been protected from commercial harvesting since 1935, they could only be taken for very limited scientific permits; the Soviets took 11 of these under the permit loophole during North Pacific whaling years, and did not report taking any illegally. Nevertheless, from 1963 to 1969, Soviet whalers killed an estimated 670 right whales in places where they were apparently recovering well from earlier whaling: in the Gulf of Alaska, Bering Sea, Okhotsk Sea, and in the waters around the Kurils and Sakhalin Island. The situation was especially bad in the Gulf of Alaska and Bering Sea, where the population was reduced to less than 30 animals overall and does not appear to have made any recovery since the illegal Soviet whaling. The Okhotsk Sea populations, despite numbering only a few hundred whales, may be slowly recovering. Initially, biologist Nikolai Doroschenko only discovered 372 illegally killed right whales from the Gulf of Alaska and Bering Sea in his original data (1994); it was not until 2012 that records of nearly 300 additional illegal kills from the Sea of Okhotsk and the Kurils region were found as well.

Whaling for sperm whales was by far the bulk of all operations in the North Pacific, indeed so much that whaling in this region could have never existed without the presence of the sperm whale. The large males, which were the most coveted in whaling operations, had already been rapidly depleted, but since size restrictions existed for females, it was assumed that males would have to make up most of the catch. Nevertheless, during the period 1972–1977, as much as 80% of the catch in most areas was females, whereas in the period 1970–71, 9,000 females were caught but only 1,800 reported, while in the same years 12,300 males were reported but only 5,700 killed. This extreme deception led to one of the most consequential decisions in the IWC during the pre-moratorium era: the lowering of the minimum size of sperm whales to 30 feet (9.2 m) from 38 feet (11.6 m). This was designed to take pressure off males, but as there were comparatively few males caught in the first place, this only put even more pressure on the females and decreased the reproductive capability of the entire North Pacific population, probably hindering recovery for some time to come. Even these regulations were not always followed by the Soviets; when Bob Hunter and Greenpeace launched their first anti-whaling campaign in 1975 the first whale they encountered was 5 feet under the legal limit, implying taking of calves and under-sized whales was not uncommon for pelagic fleets and continuing despite the international observers on board. However, it has become known that Japanese observers, which were frequent aboard Soviet whaling ships, agreed to "swap statistics" with the Soviets to avoid being caught, and in this fashion the Soviets could avoid being exposed for whaling violations.

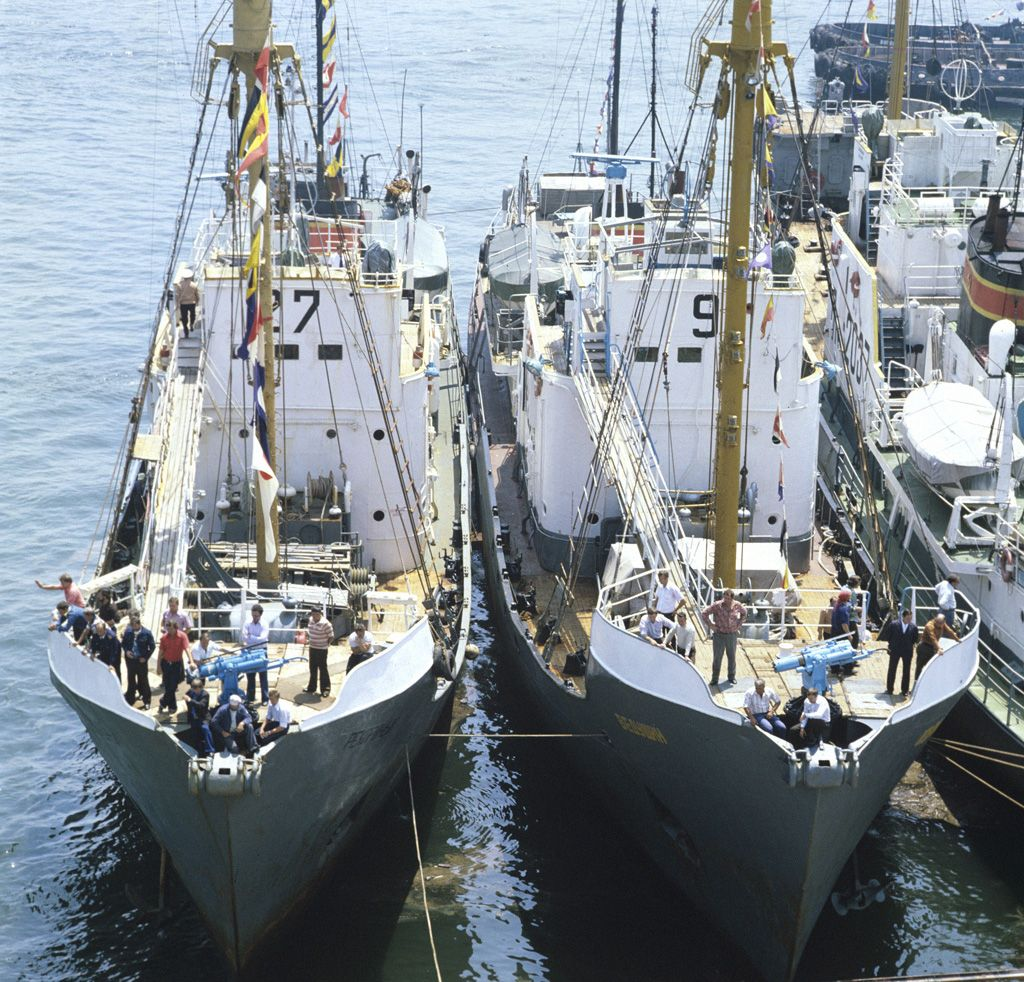
Catcher ships of the Soviet whaling fleet at Vladivostok in 1979

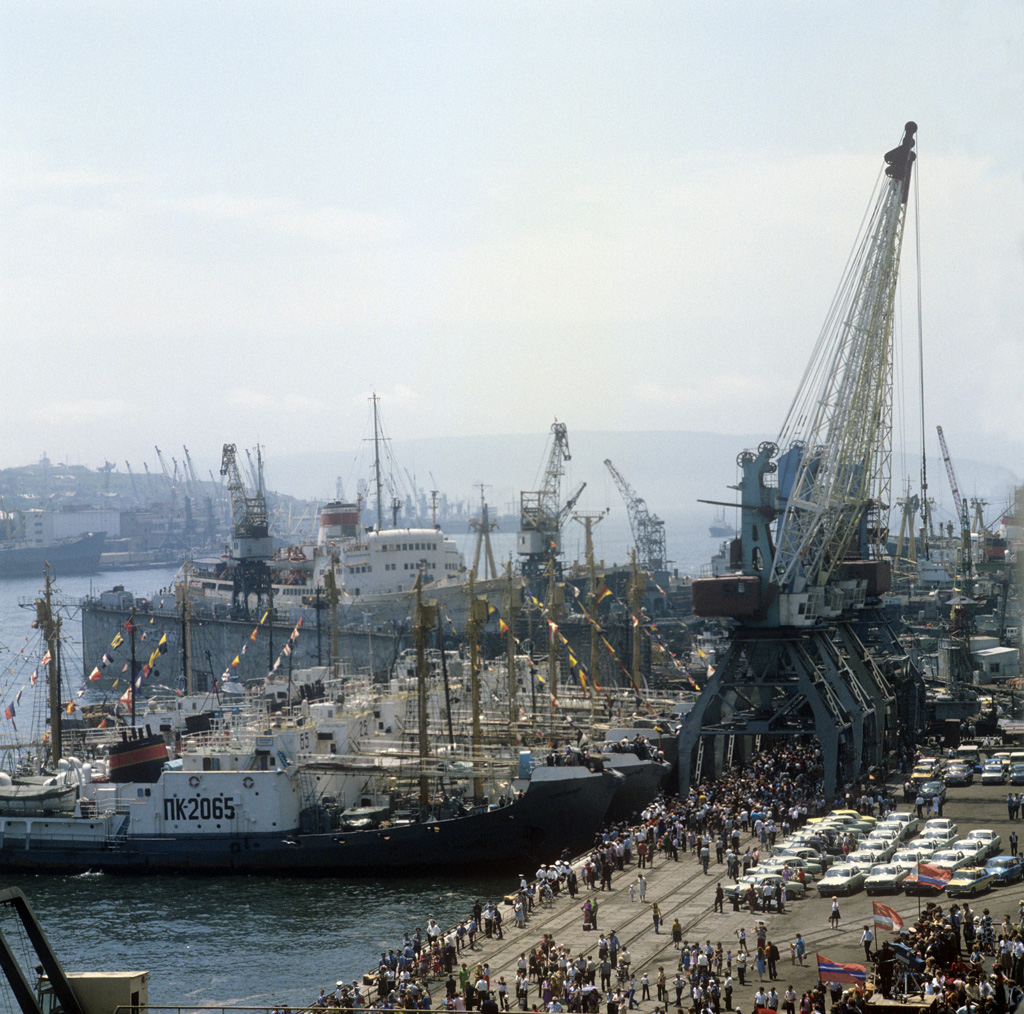
Catcher ships of the Sovetskaya Rossiya fleet at Vladivostok in 1980, after the conclusion of their final season in the Antarctic

==== The decline of whaling: 1973–1980 ====
The rise of whale conservation and the decline of whale stocks soon caused the Soviet whaling industry to decline from its heyday. The ageing Aleut was retired in 1967. Slava, the second oldest in the fleet, was removed from the Antarctic after the 1965–66 whaling season and taken to the North Pacific, where she worked for four seasons until her retirement in 1969. The real decline in whaling came shortly after the International Observers Scheme, which ended Soviet illegal whaling, and combined with decreasing catches of all species, rapidly caused the decline of the remaining fleets. Yuriy Dolgorukiy was retired in 1975. In that same year, the environmental group Greenpeace launched Project Ahab, the first direct action anti-whaling campaign, which intercepted the Dalniy Vostok fleet 60 nautical miles off the coast of Eureka, California. Although the activists failed to prevent the catcher ship Vlastny from firing over their heads and killing a whale, they nevertheless galvanized the then-new anti-whaling movement. Two further confrontations in 1976 and 1977 further destabilized the Soviet's position as their taking of undersized whales and other infractions were publicly exposed for the first time. Eventually, the Vladivostok stopped whaling in 1978, a year after its confrontation with Greenpeace. The beleaguered Dalniy Vostok fleet was forced to stop whaling in 1979 due to a ban on all factory-ship whaling except for minke whales in the Antarctic; after it violated an order that same year banning factory whaling of sperm whales worldwide, the Sovetskaya Rossiya fleet (which killed over 150 sperms in the Antarctic in its last season in 1979–80) stopped whaling in 1980, leaving only Sovetskaya Ukraina in service.

==== The end of whaling: 1980–1987 ====
Despite desperate efforts to keep this aging fleet in service and attempts by the Soviet government to preserve the industry by voting against and objecting to the 1982 ban on commercial whaling, the industry was already doomed. After two seasons of Antarctic whaling in objection to the moratorium, which took effect from the 1985–86 season onward, the Soviet government finally gave up commercial whaling, ordering the Sovetskaya Ukraina fleet home after the end of the 1986–87 season, bringing an end to 55 years of Soviet whaling. Whaling in the Soviet Union was abolished on 22 May 1987, and while the USSR did not formally withdraw its objection to the moratorium, it did not make any further plans to continue whaling at a later date. Since the dissolution of the USSR in 1991, there have been no serious attempts by the Russian government to restart commercial whaling, although Russia remains part of the pro-whaling bloc of nations at the IWC, frequently voting with Japan on issues relating to overturning the whaling ban.

== The process of whaling ==
As part of the USSR's planned economy (which, during the 1950s through the 1970s was by far the largest in the world), Soviet whaling developed through somewhat ambiguous processes. The production targets, initially set by the Ministry of Food and Light Industry, were soon transferred to the newly created Ministry of Fisheries as Soviet whaling and fishing became a large, global industry.

Once whaling was established as a reliable economic activity at the end of the 1940s, the first production targets were set, probably on the advice of the whalers who recommended they be set according to initial catches regardless of sustainability (sustainability was largely ignored throughout the entire history of Soviet whaling and targets almost always exceeded maximum sustainable yield). Such targets were part of the Five-Year Plans set by Gosplan to drive the Soviet economy, and they had to be met at the end of every year until the plan ended after 5 years. Meeting the plans at the end of each year resulted in a 25% bonus above typical salary; when the plan was exceeded by 20% or more, bonuses were 60% of usual. Additionally, if targets were exceeded and bonuses given to whaling crews, the next year's target was raised to the level attained last year and more whales were expected to be caught, again regardless of the condition of the population. This irrational system of planning is largely the reason for the constant increases of Soviet whale catches in the years following the Second World War and fueled the massive increase of Soviet whaling which took place in 1959–63. Because of the declining nature of whale stocks, crews rarely were able to exceed target plans, and to meet them at all required immense violations of whaling regulations and the taking of protected or undersized whales. The only known case of a fleet meeting the coveted 60% bonus increase was the Dalniy Vostok fleet in 1967, which exceeded the yearly whaling plan by 121% to mark the 50th anniversary of Soviet Russia. Even if whalers failed to meet targets, the year's plan remained unchanged (i.e., it did not lower in response to whalers failing to meet targets unlike its continuous increase if they exceed targets), which gave the crews all the more incentive to meet targets by killing any whale they could find regardless of legality, as failure to meet targets could result in a reduction of pay or other penalties.

Killed whales were recorded on what were known as "whale passports" documenting the type of whale, length, gender, and date on which it was killed. All whales were listed this way, and the reports were kept hidden in secret vaults by KGB agents, after which the tally of the actual catch was falsified to ensure that it "complied" with IWC regulations. When a factory fleet visited a foreign port, all seamen who left the ship had to be accompanied by a KGB agent or other high-ranking Communist Party member to ensure they could not defect or leak the illegal whaling information to people in the foreign country. The role of scientists on factory fleets was largely to study whales and their lifestyles through dissection of killed animals, examination of stomach contents, or studying of pregnant females and their nearly developed fetuses. The role of scientists with regards to sustainability was tolerated superficially only because "everyone else had science, so we should too."

Despite the constant attempts to market whale products for human food, it never took off and the main uses of whales in the Soviet economy would be using sperm oil for heat-resistant lubricants and whale meat for animal food. Oil was initially the preferred product from baleen whales, with meat only being used after 1952. However, as many whales were rotten by the time they reached the factory ship after being caught from great distances, they were simply discarded after the blubber was cut away. Additionally, since whaling was a satellite of the fishing industry and therefore was based upon gross output like the fish industry was, any whale products that were not necessary for the plan target were still obtained in killed animals, but were simply discarded without ever being used, adding to the wastefulness of Soviet whaling.

The Communist Party of the Soviet Union is considered to be behind many of the advances of Soviet whaling and in some cases laid the groundwork for it. Commentators have also indicated that the obsession with being bigger and better than Western whaling countries and the constant rhetoric to their own seamen that all capitalist nations were illegally whaling (as was true in Japan) helped spur the killing of more whales by the USSR to ensure they were killed by socialist rather than capitalist states.

The public stance of the Soviet delegation to the IWC was understandably changing as the country expanded its whaling operations: despite falsification from the start, the overall low catches prior to the mid-1950s ensured that the Soviets could appear to be on the side of conservation and proper management of whale stocks. However, by 1962 they had four large fleets in the Antarctic and huge illegal catches were being made, so all facades of conservation were ended, and the USSR became one of the staunchest opponents of whaling regulations, successfully delaying (along with Japan) protection of the blue whale by two seasons and being the single foremost opponent of the International Observer Scheme of the IWC. First proposed in the 1950s by Norway, it did not become reality until 1972 when it was finally implemented on all pelagic whaling fleets after nearly two decades of foundering. The USSR, which was at the forefront of opposition, agreed only to (after final quotas for each species would be established) have observers come from communist countries, presumably as an attempt to ensure illegal catches could continue as observers from communist countries could easily be manipulated through economic threats to bow to the whalers' wishes or face possible intervention from the Soviet Union. By the time the IOS was effective in 1973, so few whales remained that even if it had never been implemented, it would have saved few cetaceans as little would have been left to kill in the first place.

Yuri Mikhalev and Dmitriy Tormosov (another scientist who witnessed the destruction of whale stocks) told Phil Clapham and Yulia Ivashchenko decades after the USSR collapsed that senior personnel in the Ministry of Fisheries were well aware of the destruction of whale stocks by the whaling industry, yet stood by and defended the illegal catches as necessary for the Five-Year Plans. In 1967, Mikhalev complained to the fisheries minister Aleksandr Ishkov that if illegal catches did not stop, certain species of already-depleted whales would go extinct, and his grandchildren would never get to see them. Ishkov infamously responded, "Your grandchildren? Your grandchildren aren't the ones who can remove me from my job."

In short, Yulia Ivashchenko summed up Soviet whaling in one sentence: The combination of the requirement to meet or exceed production targets, together with socialistic competition, turned the business of whaling (and every other industry in the U.S.S.R.) into an often manic numbers game.

== Effects of illegal whaling ==
The effects of Soviet whaling were felt differently by different whale stocks, though all southern ocean baleen whales were negatively affected by it. Blue, humpback, and right whales were affected the most: Antarctic blue whales in the southern ocean were reduced to about 350, or less than 0.15% of their original numbers, due to Soviet whaling; they are still recovering today. The effects of whaling on the more abundant pygmy blue whales is less known. Humpback whales from the New Zealand-Oceania stock were depleted to perhaps 150 whales due to illegal Soviet whaling; even today, they number only about 20% of their original numbers and are increasing slower than other humpback populations. Despite a mass illegal kill of over 1,300 southern right whales off the coast of Argentina in 1962, populations seem to be recovering well and today Argentina is home to the largest population of southern right whales in the world. North Pacific right whales, on the other hand, with populations reduced to the low hundreds in the west and about 30 in the east, are showing little, if any, recovery at all and illegal Soviet whaling may be the eventual demise of the eastern population, as it has little genetic diversity due to its minuscule size (though greater than the closely related North Atlantic right whale). The effect of Soviet whaling on fin, sei, Bryde's, and minke whales is less known, but there is no doubt that it contributed to the decline of all of these species and only minkes survived in large numbers due to their abundance. Sperm whales were heavily depressed in both the Southern Hemisphere and North Pacific due to Soviet whaling, being the mainstay of the industry everywhere, and populations are recovering very slowly; the effect of the killing of unusually large numbers of females in the North Pacific has yet to be fully understood.
