= Cape Temnyy =

Headland in Khabarovsk Krai, Russia

Cape Temnyy Two Sisters
- Cape
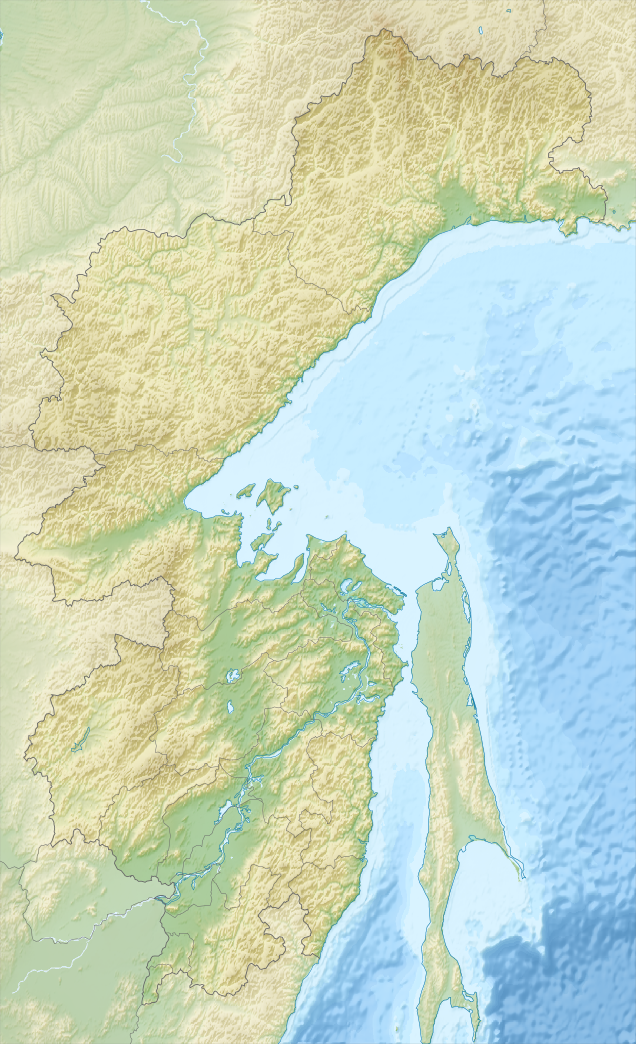
- Coordinates: 54°13′N 137°12′E
- Location: Khabarovsk Krai, Russia
- Offshore water bodies: Sea of Okhotsk

Area
  - Total: Russian Far East
- Elevation: 165 m (541 ft)

Cape Temnyy (Russian: Mys Temnyy) is a headland in Khabarovsk Krai, Russia.

== Geography ==
The cape is on the eastern side of Tugur Bay, 12 km (about 8 mi) southwest of Cape Bersen'yeva. It consists of seaward-facing, dark cliffs and two conspicuous hills that rise straight up from the coast. It rises to a height of 165 m (541 ft).

== History ==
American whaleships cruising for bowhead whales frequented the waters off the cape from the 1850s to the 1880s. They called it the Two Sisters. Boat crews also camped near the cape.
