= Tugur, Khabarovsk Krai =

Tugur Тугур
- Village
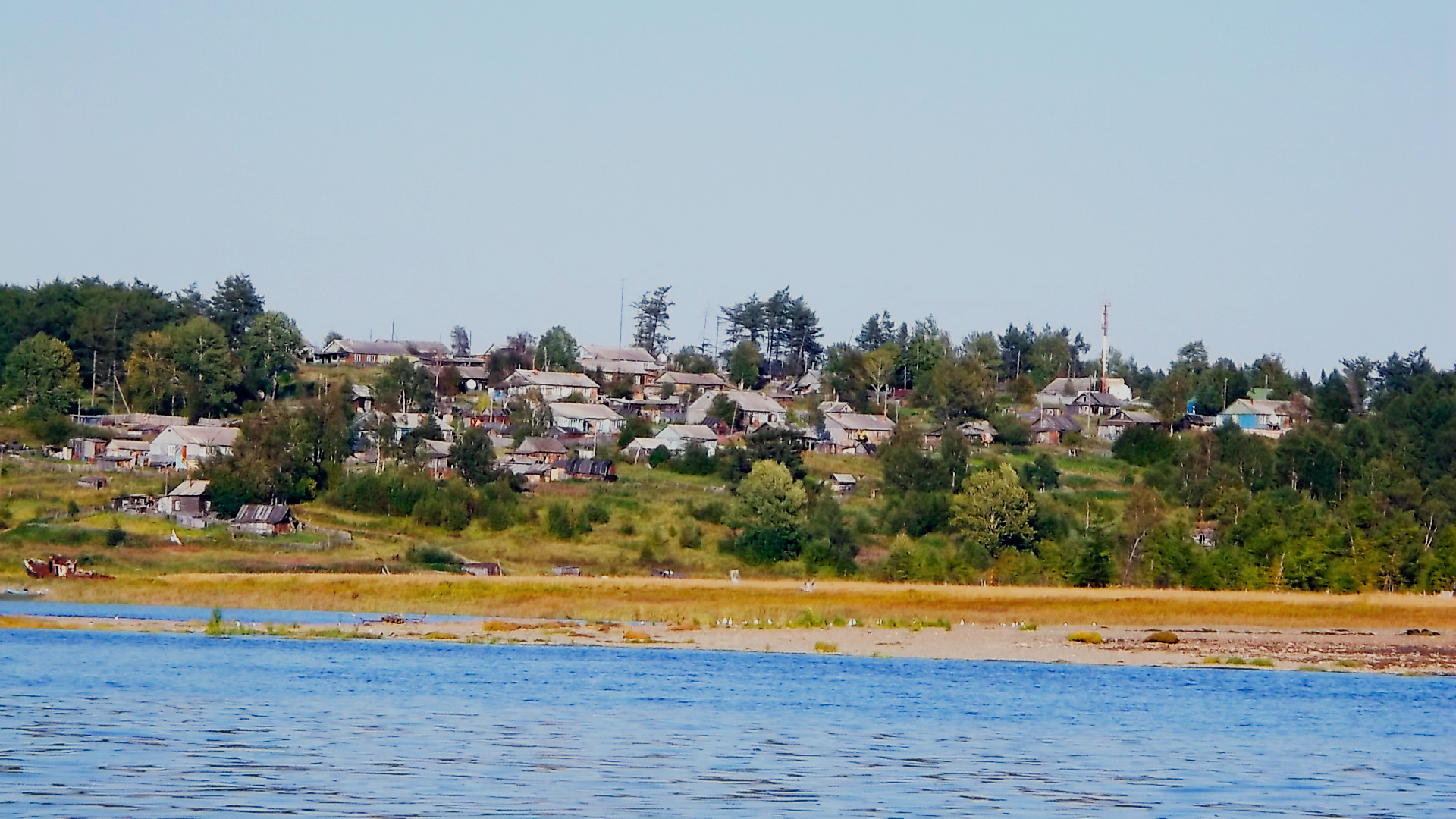
- Interactive map of Tugur
- Location of Tugur
- Coordinates: 53°46′00″N 136°50′00″E
- Country: Russia
- Federal subject: Khabarovsk Krai
- Founded: 1653
- Elevation: 25 m (82 ft)

Population
  - Estimate (2021): 315 )
- Time zone: UTC+10 (MSK+7)
- Postal code: 682564
- OKTMO ID: 08646407101

Tugur is a village in the Tuguro-Chumikansky District of Khabarovsk Krai. It is the administrative center of the rural settlement Tugur Village Rural Settlement.

== History ==
=== Modern period ===
In 1652, Yerofey Khabarov sent a party of 20 Cossacks under the command of Ivan Nagiba to the mouth of the Amur and then by sea to explore the Okhotsk coast. On the 11th day of sailing in the open sea, during a strong storm, the ship hit the rocks near the shore. All supplies of food, weapons and ammunition sank, but the Cossacks somehow mostly survived. Following the coast, they stocked up on provisions from the Evenks and settled at the mouth of the Tugur River. Ivan Nagiba, having handed over the command to the Cossack Uvarov, departed for Yakutsk, leaving the cossacks behind. Uvarov, together with the remaining Cossacks, built a winter hut, which was constantly expanded, and in 1653 it was renamed Tugursky Fortress. Local Evenks residents also took part in the construction of the fort, as they saw the Cossacks as possible protectors from the Manchus. This hope was crushed when in 1657 the Qing Empire's army stormed the fort and burned it down. Despite this, the surviving Cossacks and the Evenks rebuilt the fort in 1659. The Qing's army would however once again destroy it in 1684.

According to the Treaty of Nerchinsk in 1689, the settlements and the fort (which was rebuilt several times) found themselves in an undemarcated territory between the Uda and Amur basins; after this date, reports of the fort ceased. In 1712, 10 people from the expedition of the Cossack Bykov to the Shantar Islands spent the winter in the location of the settlements and the once-was fort.

=== Contemporary period ===
The village grew, and under the Soviet Union, on 4 January 1926, the village became part of the newly formed Tuguro-Chumikansky District by a resolution of the Presidium of the All-Russian Central Executive Committee.

In 1932, a cultural center was opened in the village-settlement. It soon became the most significant cultural and economic center for the elimination of illiteracy among the native population. The first local historian at the cultural base was Pyotr Stepanov. In 1934, specialists were brought to Tugur, and involved the local population in various fields such as culture, medical services, reindeer herding and also introduced agriculture and did other work to promote the ideology of socialism in the area.

Starting from 21 June 1938, Vasily Evgenievich Rozov worked as a local historian and head of the museum at the cultural base previously created by the Soviets. During the Great Patriotic War, he continued his scientific research. The materials and exhibits he collected formed the basis of the collections of the Nikolaevsky-on-Amur Local History Museum.

Particularly intensive construction began in 1975. Many new houses were built. In 1986, a new kindergarten was commissioned. In 1977, by merging the two largest collective farms of the region, "named after the XXII Party Congress" and "named after Sergei Lazo", the reindeer herding state farm "Chumikansky" was formed. As of 1987, the number of reindeer in Tugur was 1,000, more than the local human population.

== Geographical location ==
Situated at the mouth of the Kutyn River (3 km east of the mouth of the Tugur River near the coast of the Tugur Bay of the Sea of Okhotsk . It is located 145 km southeast of the village of Chumikan, 270 km west of Nikolaevsk-on-Amur and 600 km north of Khabarovsk.

== Local infrastructure ==
The village has a hospital, a post office, a primary comprehensive school and a local club. There are no roads within the village. There is a pier and an airfield. The following enterprises are operating in the town: Tugur-Ryba, Factoria Lumukan, Granit, a branch of Khabarovsk Airlines.

== Climate ==
=== Air temperature ===
The average annual air temperature in Tugur is −3.0 °C. The average temperature in the summer months is 9–15 °C. The maximum temperature ever recorded in the area was of 40 °C in June 1990.

Average temperatures of the coldest part of the winter's months is around −23 °C. The absolute minimum temperature for the entire observation period in the area's history (between 1940 and 1995, spanning from the Soviet period to the early Post-Soviet period) was −47 °C.

The heating period lasts on average about 260 days. The average temperature of the heating period is close to −10 °C.

=== Air humidity ===
The average annual humidity is 75%, with maximum humidity observed in August (85%) and minimum in March (68%).

=== Wind ===
In winter, the prevailing wind is from the south (63–71%), and from March to September, the wind is from the north (39–47%). The average annual wind speed is 3.1 m/s. The highest average monthly wind speed (5.1–6.0 m/s) is observed with the north direction in the period from October to January. The maximum gust of wind was 45 m/s.

=== Precipitation ===
On average, Tugur receives 585mm of precipitation per year. The warm period (April–October) accounts for 84% of the annual precipitation (493 mm). From July to September, the amount of precipitation reaches its greatest amount. During the cold period, 92 mm falls. The minimum precipitation is observed in February. The maximum monthly precipitation was recorded in August 1981 and amounted to 239 mm. The daily maximum (93 mm) was recorded in September 1987.

=== Snow cover ===
The average date of formation of stable snow cover is 21 November, the average date of its destruction is 1 April. The average duration is 131 days.

=== Atmospheric phenomena ===
On average, there are 12 days with thunderstorms per year in Tugur. The largest number of days with thunderstorms was observed in July and amounted to 11 days.

There are an average of 47 foggy days per year. The greatest number of foggy days is observed in the summer months and amounts to 18–19 days.

== Attractions ==
The village's landmark is Mount Lumukan on the coast of Tugur Bay with unique caves.

== Time zone ==
The village of Tugur is located in the time zone MSK+7. The offset of the applied time relative to UTC is +10:00.
