= Seneka Point =

Headland in the Sea of Okhotsk

Coordinates: 54°19′N 137°44′E

Seneka Point (Russian: Mys Seneka) is a steep-to point in the western Sea of Okhotsk. It has sheer cliffs that are 152 m (500 ft) high and grayish-brown in color. It forms the eastern point of the entrance to Tugur Bay, the southeastern point of Lindholm Strait, and the western point of the entrance of Academy Bay; to its north lies Belichy Island. Numerous tide rips and eddies form near the point.

== History ==
American whaleships cruised for bowhead whales off the point between 1855 and 1874. They called it Shantar Head or Walrus Point.
