= Cape Bersen'yeva =

Headland in Khabarovsk Krai, Russia

Cape Bersen'yeva Silas Richards Bluff
- Cape
- Coordinates: 54°17′N 137°23′E
- Location: Khabarovsk Krai, Russia
- Offshore water bodies: Sea of Okhotsk

Area
  - Total: Russian Far East

Cape Bersen'yeva (Russian: Mys Bersen'yeva) is a headland in Khabarovsk Krai, Russia.

== Geography ==
The cape is on the northeastern side of Tugur Bay, 20 km (about 12 mi) to the west of Seneka Point. It is high and conspicuous, rising to a height of 162 m (531 ft).

== History ==
American whaleships frequented the waters off the cape between 1854 and 1889, anchoring off it and sending whaleboats down the bay for bowhead whales or sending boats to the cape itself to cruise for whales as well. Boat crews also camped at the cape. They called it Silas Richards Bluff, after the ship Silas Richards, of New Bedford, which was wrecked in a bay near the cape on 13 July 1854. On 27 July 1867, the bark Java, of New Bedford, was ordered out of Tugur Bay near the cape by a Russian man-of-war.
