= List of shipwrecks in March 1854 =

The list of shipwrecks in March 1854 includes ships sunk, wrecked, grounded, or otherwise lost during March 1854.

== 1 March ==
List of shipwrecks: 1 March 1854
Ship	State	Description
Acastus	United Kingdom	The ship was abandoned in the Atlantic Ocean. Her crew were rescued by Liverpool (United Kingdom). Acastus was on a voyage from New York, United States to London.
City of Glasgow	United Kingdom	The passenger ship departed Liverpool, Lancashire, for Philadelphia, Pennsylvania, United States. She subsequently foundered in the Irish Sea with the loss of about 480 lives.

== 2 March ==
List of shipwrecks: 2 March 1854
Ship	State	Description
Eagle	(United Kingdom of Great Britain and Ireland) British North America	The brig was abandoned in the Atlantic Ocean. She was on a voyage from Halifax, Nova Scotia to Liverpool, Lancashire.
Russell	United States	The schooner foundered off Cape Cod, Massachusetts with the loss of all nine people on board.
Swea	Sweden	The barque ran aground and was damaged at St. Ubes, Portugal. She was refloated and taken in to St. Ubes for repairs.
Waverley	United Kingdom	The ship ran aground off Deal, Kent. She was on a voyage from South Shields, County Durham to Genoa, Kingdom of Sardinia.

== 3 March ==
List of shipwrecks: 3 March 1854
Ship	State	Description
Champion	United Kingdom	The steamship was in collision with Chevy Chase (United Kingdom) and sank in the North Sea off South Shields, County Durham. Her crew were rescued.
Holyhead Trader	United Kingdom	The ship was driven ashore near Soldier's Point, County Louth.
Indian	United Kingdom	The barque ran aground at Kirkcaldy, Fife. She was on a voyage from Callao, Peru to Kirkcaldy.
Leander	Prussia	The brig was driven ashore near "Terreviessa". She was on a voyage from Naples, Kingdom of the Two Sicilies to Antwerp, Belgium.
Mary Jenkins	(United Kingdom of Great Britain and Ireland) Natal	The ship was wrecked with the loss of all on board.
Tubal Cain	Flag unknown	The ship was set afire by her crew off Port Phillip Heads, Victoria.

== 4 March ==
List of shipwrecks: 4 March 1854
Ship	State	Description
Amicitia	Duchy of Holstein	The jacht was damaged in the North Sea. She was on a voyage from Eckernförde to Leith, Lothian, United Kingdom. She put in to Nyborg, Denmark on 10 March in a severely leaky condition.
Auguste Caroline	Denmark	The ship was driven ashore on Læsø, Denmark. Her crew were rescued. She was on a voyage from Hartlepool, County Durham, United Kingdom to Copenhagen. She was declared a total loss.
Charles Humberston	United Kingdom	The ship was driven ashore in Dundrum Bay. She was on a voyage from Liverpool, Lancashire to Boston, Massachusetts, United States. She was refloated on 27 July and taken in tow, but had to be beached.
Due Figlie	Austrian Empire	The ship caught fire at Trieste and was scuttled. She was on a voyage from Trieste to Liverpool.
Idem	Norway	The ship ran aground and sank on a reef east of Skagen, Denmark. She was on a voyage from Christiansand to Aarhus, Denmark. She later floated off and was towed in to Marstrand, Sweden in a waterlogged condition.
Ivan	Russian Empire	The barque struck a sunken rock off Bangka Island, Netherlands East Indies and was beached. She was on a voyage from Hartlepool to Singapore, Straits Settlements.
Paris and London	France	The steamship ran aground off Deal, Kent, United Kingdom. She was on a voyage from London to Paris.
Spring	United Kingdom	The brig was in collision with the steamship Himalaya (United Kingdom) in the Strait of Gibraltar. She was on a voyage from Odesa to Cork. She was towed in to Gibraltar by Himalaya but ran aground there due to her waterlogged condition.

== 5 March ==
List of shipwrecks: 5 March 1854
Ship	State	Description
Robert Preston	United Kingdom	The ship was severely damaged by fire at Liverpool, Lancashire.

== 6 March ==
List of shipwrecks: 6 March 1854
Ship	State	Description
Elizabeth and Jane	United Kingdom	The ship ran aground at Newry, County Antrim.
Glencairn	United Kingdom	The ship struck a sunken rock and was consequently beached at Rutland, County Donegal. She was on a voyage from Liverpool, Lancashire to Ballina, County Mayo.
Robert Kelly	United States	The ship ran aground on Jack Hole's Bank, in the Irish Sea off the coast of County Wicklow, United Kingdom. All on board, including 690 passengers, were rescued by the steamships Iron Duke (United Kingdom) and Prospero (United Kingdom). Robert Kelly was on a voyage from Liverpool to New York. She was refloated on 8 March and towed in to Kingstown, County Dublin.
Sultan	United Kingdom	The barque was severely damaged by fire at Panama City, Republic of New Granada.

== 7 March ==
List of shipwrecks: 7 March 1854
Ship	State	Description
Glencairn	United Kingdom	The ship struck a sunken rock and was beached at Rutland, County Donegal. She was on a voyage from Liverpool, Lancashire to Ballina, County Mayo.
Perthshire	United Kingdom	The ship struck the Soldier's Rock, off Yarmouth, Nova Scotia, British North America. She was consequently beached . She was on a voyage from Saint John, New Brunswick, British North America to Liverpool.

== 8 March ==
List of shipwrecks: 8 March 1854
Ship	State	Description
Atlantic	United States	The paddle steamer was driven ashore at Sandy Hook, New Jersey. She was on a voyage from Liverpool, Lancashire, United Kingdom to New York.
Chieftain	United Kingdom	The steamship was driven ashore and wrecked in the Clyde. She was on a voyage from the Clyde to Port Phillip, Victoria.
Margaret Mitchell	United Kingdom	The ship ran aground at Shanghai, China. She was on a voyage from Hong Kong to Shanghai. She was refloated but found to be severely hogged and was condemned.
Queen Bee	United Kingdom	The ship ran aground on the Longsand, in the North Sea off the coast of Essex. She was on a voyage from Hamburg to Liverpool. She was refloated and put in to Sunderland, County Durham for repairs.

== 9 March ==
List of shipwrecks: 9 March 1854
Ship	State	Description
Æolus	Prussia	The ship was driven ashore near "Strackelberg". She was refloated the next day with assistance from the steamship Jack (Flag unknown) and towed in to Swinemünde.
Beta	United Kingdom	The ship was driven ashore at Great Yarmouth, Norfolk. She was refloated and resumed her voyage.
Duchess of Lancaster	United Kingdom	The ship was driven ashore at Sandgate, Kent. She was on a voyage from Manila, Spanish East Indies to London. She was refloated and taken in tow.
Fortuna	Lübeck	The ship was driven ashore near Prerow, Prussia. She was on a voyage from Lübeck to Reval, Russia.
Harriet Preston	United Kingdom	The ship struck a sunken rock at the entrance to the Larne Lough and was damaged. She was on a voyage from Port Dinorwic, Caernarfonshire to Kirkcaldy, Fife. She put in to Belfast, County Antrim for repairs.
Jane	United Kingdom	The ship was driven ashore at Calais, France. She was on a voyage from Newcastle upon Tyne, Northumberland to Boulogne, Pas-de-Calais, France.
Lady Eglington	United Kingdom	The ship was driven ashore at Newhaven, Sussex. She was on a voyage from Liverpool, Lancashire to London. She was refloated and resumed her voyage.
Pantheon	United States	The ship was driven ashore and wrecked at Rhosneigr, Anglesey. United Kingdom. Her crew survived. She was on a voyage from New York to Liverpool.
Prosperitas	Grand Duchy of Tuscany	The ship was driven ashore and damaged east of Rye, Sussex, United Kingdom. She was on a voyage from Odesa to Hull, Yorkshire, United Kingdom.
Sardine	United Kingdom	The ship was driven ashore at South Foreland, Kent. She was on a voyage from Caernarfon to Aberdeen. She was refloated and taken in to Ramsgate, Kent in a leaky condition.
Triton	Greifswald	The ship was driven ashore and wrecked near Höganäs, Sweden. She was on a voyage from Hartlepool, County Durham, United Kingdom to Danzig.

== 10 March ==
List of shipwrecks: 10 March 1854
Ship	State	Description
Marie Antoinette	France	The ship was wrecked near "Mordland", Norway with the loss of her captain.

== 11 March ==
List of shipwrecks: 11 March 1854
Ship	State	Description
British Hero	United Kingdom	The fishing smack was discovered derelict in the Dogger Bank. She was towed in to Antwerp, Belgium.
Cary	Lübeck	The ship was driven ashore and wrecked at Hasle, Bornholm, Denmark. Her crew were rescued.
Perthshire	(United Kingdom of Great Britain and Ireland) British North America	The ship was driven ashore at the mouth of the "Jebogne River". She was on a voyage from Saint John, New Brunswick to Liverpool, Lancashire.
Union	United States	The brig capsized in the Atlantic Ocean. Her crew were rescued on 15 March by Jeune Edouard (France). Union was on a voyage from Pará, Brazil to New York.
X Juni	Danzig	The brig ran aground on the Gunfleet Sand, in the North Sea off the coast of Essex, United Kingdom. She was on a voyage from Swinemünde to London, United Kingdom. She was refloated with the assistance of eight smacks and taken in to Harwich, Essex in a leaky condition. She was repaired and resumed her voyage

== 12 March ==
List of shipwrecks: 12 March 1854
Ship	State	Description
Westminster	United Kingdom	The ship sprang a leak and capsized in the Atlantic Ocean. Nine of her eighteen crew were rescued by Actæon (United Kingdom), the remainder were left on the wreck; three of them survived long enough to be rescued on 28 March by Cambria (United Kingdom) when the wreck was at 43°25′N 44°05′W. Westminster was on a voyage from British Honduras to Queenstown, County Cork.

== 13 March ==
List of shipwrecks: 13 March 1854
Ship	State	Description
Jannet	United Kingdom	The smack sprang a leak and was beached on the Mull of Galloway, Ayrshire, where she was wrecked. She was on a voyage from Liverpool, Lancashire to the Clyde.
Refuge	United Kingdom	The full-rigged ship ran aground in the River Avon at Hotwells, Gloucestershire. She was refloated with the assistance of three tugs, including Tiger (United Kingdom). Refuge was on a voyage from Bristol, Gloucestershire to Callao, Peru.

== 14 March ==
List of shipwrecks: 14 March 1854
Ship	State	Description
David G. Fleming	United Kingdom	The ship ran aground at Liverpool, Lancashire. She was on a voyage from Saint John, New Brunswick, British North America to Liverpool. She was refloated and taken in to Liverpool.
Flirt	Norway	The brig capsized in the River Tyne in a squall.
Harriet	United Kingdom	The ship ran aground at Constantinople, Ottoman Empire. She was on a voyage from Odesa to Falmouth, Cornwall or Queenstown, County Cork. She was refloated on 17 March and subsequently resumed her voyage.
Neptunus	Norway	The ship was abandoned in the North Sea. All on board were rescued by Handelmaatschappij (Netherlands). Neptunus was on a voyage from Holmestrand to Leith, Lothian, United Kingdom.
Pharga	Flag unknown	The ship was driven ashore east of Gibraltar She was on a voyage from "Orphago" to Antwerp, Belgium. She was refloated on 18 March and taken in to Gibraltar.

== 15 March ==
List of shipwrecks: 15 March 1854
Ship	State	Description
Mary Scott	(United Kingdom of Great Britain and Ireland) British North America	The ship was holed by ice and sank in the Atlantic Ocean with the loss of a crew member. She was on a voyage from Liverpool, Lancashire to Boston, Massachusetts, United States.

== 16 March ==
List of shipwrecks: 16 March 1854
Ship	State	Description
Caiman	French Navy	The Elan-class corvette was lost in the Gulf of Aden at Zeyla, Sultanate of the Geledi. Her crew were rescued.

== 17 March ==
List of shipwrecks: 17 March 1854
Ship	State	Description
Cheviot	United Kingdom	The ship was wrecked at St. Ubes, Portugal. Her crew were rescued.
Dean Swift	United Kingdom	The smack sprang a leak and sank in Blackmill Bay. Her crew were rescued. She was on a voyage from Ardrossan, Ayrshire to Oban, Argyllshire.

== 18 March ==
List of shipwrecks: 18 March 1854
Ship	State	Description
Coronella	United Kingdom	The ship was driven ashore near Milford Haven, Pembrokeshire. She was on a voyage from New Orleans, Louisiana, United States to Liverpool, Lancashire. Coronella was later refloated and towed in to Liverpool, where she arrived on 28 March.
Flor	Portugal	The schooner was taken in to Westport, County Mayo, United Kingdom in a derelict condition. She was on a voyage from Camina to Queenstown, County Cork, United Kingdom.
Liberal	United Kingdom	The ship foundered in the North Sea off Skegness, Lincolnshire with the loss of all hands.

== 19 March ==
List of shipwrecks: 19 March 1854
Ship	State	Description
Annegina	Netherlands	The ship ran aground on the Haisborough Sands, in the North Sea off the coast of Norfolk, United Kingdom. She was on a voyage from Greifswald to Amsterdam, North Holland. She was refloated and taken in to Great Yarmouth, Norfolk in a leaky condition.
Bedlington	United Kingdom	Crimean War: The barque was sunk in the Danube near Izmail, Ottoman Empire by Russian artillery fire. Her crew survived.
Crescent	United Kingdom	Crimean War: The ship was severely damaged and beached in the Danube near Izmail by Russian Artillery fire. Her crew survived.
Hercules	France	The derelict ship was taken in to Galway, United Kingdom.
Jeune Estelle	France	The ship struck rocks and sank off the coast of Finistère. Her crew were rescued. She was on a voyage from Cardiff, Glamorgan, United Kingdom to Bordeaux, Gironde.
Liberal	United Kingdom	The ship foundered off Skegness, Lincolnshire.
Royal Union	United Kingdom	The brig ran aground off Skagen, Denmark and was wrecked. Her crew were rescued. She was on a voyage from Gothenburg, Sweden to Hull, Yorkshire. She was later refloated and taken in to Fredrikshavn, Denmark.

== 20 March ==
List of shipwrecks: 20 March 1854
Ship	State	Description
Admiral Jarvis	United Kingdom	The ship was driven ashore on Neuwerk. She was refloated the next day and taken into Cuxhaven.
Josephine	United Kingdom	The ship sank in the North Sea 8 nautical miles (15 km) east by south of Dimlington, Yorkshire.
Julie	Sweden	The ship foundered in the Atlantic Ocean with the loss of two of her fifteen crew. Survivors were rescued by Regatta and S. T. Roger (both United Kingdom). Julie was on a voyage from Newcastle upon Tyne, Northumberland, United Kingdom to New York, United States.
Nautilus	United Kingdom	The ship was driven ashore and wrecked near "Inger Bournon", Ottoman Empire.
Preciosa	Sweden	The brig ran aground at Cuxhaven. She was refloated and resumed her voyage.
Star	United Kingdom	The ship was driven ashore and wrecked near Carnsore Point, County Wexford. Her crew were rescued. She was on a voyage from Liverpool, Lancashire to Waterford.
Thomas	United Kingdom	The ship was beached at Fishguard, Pembrokeshire. She was on a voyage from Liverpool to Cork.

== 21 March ==
List of shipwrecks: 21 March 1854
Ship	State	Description
First	United Kingdom	The sloop was driven ashore at Aberdeen. She was on a voyage from the River Spey to "Minnigan".
Hoffnung	Stettin	The ship was driven ashore near Helsingborg, Sweden. She was on a voyage from Bordeaux, Gironde, France to Stettin. She was refloated with the assistance of a steamship and taken in to Helsingør, Denmark.
James	United Kingdom	The ship ran aground off Skagen, Denmark. She capsized and was wrecked. She was on a voyage from Hartlepool, County Durham to Stettin.
John	United Kingdom	The ship ran aground on a reef off Skagen. Her crew were rescued by a Norwegian vessel. She was on a voyage from Newcastle upon Tyne, Northumberland to Kiel, Prussia.
La Ville de Candebec	France	The barque collided with Sigisbert Cezard (United Kingdom) in the Atlantic Ocean (36°20′N 11°38′W) and was sunk with the loss of two of her ten crew. Survivors were rescued by Sigisbert Cezard. La Ville de Candebec was on a voyage from Marseille, Bouches-du-Rhône to Dunkirk, Nord.
Lioness	(United Kingdom of Great Britain and Ireland) Van Diemen's Land	The ship was wrecked on Clarke Island with the loss of four of her crew.
Margaret Reid	United Kingdom	The ship was driven ashore 6 leagues (18 nautical miles (33 km)) east of Cartagena, Spain. She was on a voyage from Marseille, Bouches-du-Rhône, France to Falmouth, Cornwall.
Royal George	United Kingdom	The schooner was in collision with another vessel and was abandoned off the east coast of Kent.

== 22 March ==
List of shipwrecks: 22 March 1854
Ship	State	Description
Allemine	Norway	The sloop was driven ashore at the entrance to the Agger Canal, Denmark. Her crew were rescued. She was on a voyage from Kristiansand to Thisted, Denmark.
Britannia	United Kingdom	The ship was driven ashore near "Carril" with the loss of all hands.
Bull	United Kingdom	The ship was driven ashore at Lymington, Hampshire. She was on a voyage from Poole, Dorset to Portsmouth, Hampshire.
Champion	United Kingdom	The paddle steamer was run into by Chevy Chase and sank off South Shields, County Durham. Her crew were rescued.
Codrington	(United Kingdom of Great Britain and Ireland) Antigua	The drogher was driven ashore and wrecked at Carson's Point.
Comet	United Kingdom	The ship was in collision with another vessel and caught fire at Spithead. She was on a voyage from Sunderland, County Durham to Venice, Kingdom of Lombardy–Venetia. She was taken in to Portsmouth, Hampshire.
Delphine	Norway	The sloop was driven ashore at the entrance to the Agger Canal. Her crew were rescued. She was on a voyage from Stavanger to Lumsfjord.
Harvey Galbraith	United Kingdom	The ship ran aground on a reef off Saona Island. She was on a voyage from Curaçao to Liverpool, Lancashire.

== 23 March ==
List of shipwrecks: 23 March 1854
Ship	State	Description
Kreutzberg	Russia	The ship was driven ashore and wrecked at Memel, Prussia. Her crew were rescued. She was on a voyage from St. Ubes, Portugal to Riga.
New York Packet	United Kingdom	The ship was driven ashore 15 nautical miles (28 km) west of Apalachicola, Florida.
Walker	United Kingdom	The ship was driven ashore near Koserow, Prussia. She was on a voyage from Sunderland, County Durham to Swinemünde, Prussia. She was refloated and completed her voyage.

== 24 March ==
List of shipwrecks: 24 March 1854
Ship	State	Description
Anna Magdalena	United Kingdom	The schooner was wrecked in the Lauwergee, off the Dutch coast. Her crew were rescued.
Bonito	Hamburg	The barque collided with Anna Kimball (United States) and sank in the English Channel 23 nautical miles (43 km) off Start Point, Devon with the loss of eleven of the fourteen people on board. She was on a voyage from Pernambuco, Brazil to Hamburg.
Ceres	United Kingdom	The brigantine was wrecked on the Kentish Knock. Her crew were rescued. She was on a voyage from Hartlepool, County Durham to Abbeville, Somme, France.
Cheviot	Van Diemen's Land	The ship was wrecked off Wilson's Promontary.
George and Mary	United Kingdom	The ship was beached on Terceira Island, Azores. She was on a voyage from Saint Domingo to Havre de Grâce, Seine-Inférieure, France.
Thistle	United Kingdom	The ship sank in the North Sea 8 nautical miles (15 km) off "Usan". Her crew were rescued. She was on a voyage from Leith, Lothian to Emsdale, Province of Canada, British North America.

== 25 March ==
List of shipwrecks: 25 March 1854
Ship	State	Description
Caroline Amalia	Denmark	The steamship ran aground in the Grønsund. She was on a voyage from Flensburg, Duchy of Holstein to Copenhagen. She was refloated and arrived at Copenhagen the next day in a sinking condition.
Quinebary	United States	The ship departed from Charleston, South Carolina for Nantes, Loire-Inférieure, France. No further trace, presumed foundered with the loss of all hands.
Russell	(United Kingdom of Great Britain and Ireland) British North America	The schooner was wrecked at Cape Cod, Massachusetts, United States with the loss of all on board.

== 26 March ==
List of shipwrecks: 26 March 1854
Ship	State	Description
Brothers	United Kingdom	The schooner was driven ashore on Düne, Heligoland. She was on a voyage from South Shields, County Durham to Hamburg. She was refloated and resumed her voyage in a leaky condition.
Marco Polo	United Kingdom	The brig was driven ashore at Melbourne, Victoria. All on board survived.
Viola	United States	The schooner was in collision with the steamship Petre; (United States) and sank off Gull Island, Massachusetts with the loss of two of her crew.

== 28 March ==
List of shipwrecks: 28 March 1854
Ship	State	Description
Brahmin	United Kingdom	The ship was sighted whilst on a voyage from The Downs to Sydney, New South Wales. No further trace.
John Wesley	United Kingdom	Calling at Koloa, Kauaʻi, Hawaii, to load additional cargo during a voyage from Honolulu, Hawaii, to San Francisco, California, the barque was caught by a southwesterly gale with heavy swell which caused her to break her anchor chains, and, in spite of assistance from the ship Joseph Hayden (Bremen) to warp out on kedge anchors, she was eventually wrecked on the shore. John Wesley was on a voyage from Honolulu, Kingdom of Hawaii to San Francisco, California, United States.

== 29 March ==
List of shipwrecks: 29 March 1854
Ship	State	Description
Favorite	Bremen	The ship was in collision with Hasper (United Kingdom) and sank in the English Channel off Start Point, Devon, United Kingdom with the loss of 199 lives.
Halicore	United Kingdom	The brig ran aground on the Corton Sand, in the North Sea off the coast of Suffolk. She was on a voyage from South Shields, County Durham to Genoa, Kingdom of Sardinia. She was refloated and resumed her voyage.
Ivy	United Kingdom	The brig ran aground and capsized in the Lea Creek. Her crew were rescued. She was on a voyage from the Lea Creek to Scarborough, Yorkshire. She was righted on 1 April.
Portugal	Portugal	The brig was abandoned in the Atlantic Ocean. Her crew were rescued by Black Eagle (United States) before she sank. Portugal was on a voyage from Pará, Brazil to New York, United States.

== 30 March ==
List of shipwrecks: 30 March 1854
Ship	State	Description
Australian	United Kingdom	The steamship ran aground in Table Bay. All on board were rescued.
Belle	(United Kingdom of Great Britain and Ireland) British North America	The ship was in collision with RMS Africa (United Kingdom) and sank in the Atlantic Ocean. She was on a voyage from Boston, Massachusetts, United States to Halifax, Nova Scotia.
Lord Douglass	United Kingdom	The ship was driven ashore. She was on a voyage from Crail, Fife to London. She was refloated and put in to North Sunderland, County Durham in a leaky condition.
Orlando	United States	The ship ran aground and sank at Nassau, Bahamas.
Robert L. Lane	United States	The packet ship was driven ashore in the Berry Islands, Bahamas. She was on a voyage from New York to Havre de Grâce, Seine-Inférieure, France. She was refloated and put back to New York for repairs.
Sarah Sands	United Kingdom	The steamship ran aground at Birkenhead, Cheshire. She was refloated the next day.

== 31 March ==
List of shipwrecks: 31 March 1854
Ship	State	Description
Actuarius	United Kingdom	The brig was wrecked between the mouths of the Elbe and Weser with the loss of her captain. She was on a voyage from Sunderland, County Durham to Hamburg.
Furst Menschikoff	Russia	The ship was driven ashore at Spithami. She was on a voyage from Liverpool, Lancashire, United Kingdom to Narva. She was later refloated and taken in the "Baltic Port", where she arrived on 7 April.
Gipsey	United Kingdom	The ship ran aground on the Vogelsand, in the North Sea. She was refloated the next day and taken in to Cuxhaven in a severely leaky condition.
John	United Kingdom	The sloop foundered in the North Sea off the mouth of the Humber. Her crew were rescued.
Margaret and Jane	United Kingdom	The ship was driven ashore at Aberdeen. She was on a voyage from Peterhead, Aberdeenshire to Aberdeen.
Perseverance	(United Kingdom of Great Britain and Ireland) Trinidad	The schooner was wrecked in Marquis Bay.
USCS Phoenix	United States Coast Survey	The survey schooner was at anchor in Mississippi Sound on the United States Gulf Coast when a tornado struck her, capsizing her and sinking her in 20 seconds. Her crew made it safely to shore in one of her boats. She was refloated three weeks later, repaired, and returned to service.

== Unknown date ==
List of shipwrecks: Unknown date in March 1854
Ship	State	Description
Admiraal	Netherlands	The galiot was in collision with a Dutch full-rigged ship in the Atlantic Ocean before 8 March and was abandoned. She was taken in tow by the full-rigged ship.
Agnes	United Kingdom	The schooner foundered in the English Channel off the coast of Devon before 25 March.
Alliance	United Kingdom	The ship was damaged by fire at Charleston, South Carolina.
Beejapore	United Kingdom	The ship ran aground on the Diamond Reef, off the coast of New York, United States. She was on a voyage from New York City to Liverpool, Lancashire.
Briton's Queen	United Kingdom	The ship was driven ashore and severely damaged at Hobart, Van Diemen's Land.
Cerro Gordo	Flag unknown	The ship ran aground on the Burbo Bank, in Liverpool Bay. She was on a voyage from New Orleans, Louisiana, United States to Liverpool.
Culloden	United Kingdom	The ship was driven ashore and severely damaged at Hobart.
Eclipse	United Kingdom	The ship was driven ashore and damaged at Hobart.
Emerald	United Kingdom	The ship was lost in the Atlantic Ocean 600 nautical miles (1,100 km) west of Cape Clear Island, County Cork. She was on a voyage from Baltimore, Maryland, United States to Liverpool.
Erbgrosshebzag Paul	Rostock	The ship was abandoned in the North Sea. Her crew were rescued. She was on a voyage from Rostock to London, United Kingdom.
Express	United Kingdom	The brig was abandoned in the Atlantic Ocean before 15 March.
Felix	United Kingdom	The brig was in collision with another vessel and was abandoned in the English Channel before 8 March.
Giulia	Austrian Empire	The brig was wrecked at Kilia, Russia.
Haabet	Netherlands	The ship was abandoned in the North Sea before 4 March. Her four crew were rescued by Vrouw Neeltje (Netherlands). Haabet was on a voyage from Rotterdam, South Holland to Hartlepool, County Durham, United Kingdom.
Henrietta	United Kingdom	The ship was driven ashore and damaged at Hobart.
Huron	United Kingdom	The barque was abandoned in the Atlantic Ocean before 10 March.
Imperador	Brazil	The steamship foundered in the São Francisco River. She was on a voyage from Bahia to "Macceo".
Jane	United Kingdom	The schooner was driven ashore in Deersound. She was on a voyage from Sunderland, County Durham to Kirkwall, Orkney Islands. She had been refloated by 31 March.
Josephine	Belgium	The ship was driven ashore in the Scheldt before 5 March. She was on a voyage from Antwerp to Hamburg. She was refloated and resumed her voyage.
Kaashandel	Netherlands	The galiot was in collision with a ship in the Atlantic Ocean on or before 2 March with the loss of her captain. She was on a voyage from Marseille, Bouches-du-Rhône, France to Amsterdam, North Holland. She was taken in tow by the vessel she collided with.
Kooger Polder	Belgium	The ship capsized in the Mediterranean Sea off Cape Spartivento, Sardinia. Her crew were rescued. She was on a voyage from Trieste to Constantinople, Ottoman Empire.
Lammet	Denmark	The jacht was lost in the North Sea before 8 March. She was on a voyage from an English port to Aarhus.
Limach Richardson	United States	The brig was abandoned in the Atlantic Ocean before 20 March.
Lucy	United Kingdom	The ship was driven ashore at Jurby, Isle of Man. She was on a voyage from Liverpool to Mobile, Alabama, United States. She was refloated on 13 March but consequently had to be beached. She was refloated on 17 April and taken in to Ramsey, Isle of Man.
Lucy Pulciver	United States	The fishing schooner was lost on the Georges Bank. lost with all 9 hands.
Marianne	United Kingdom	The ship was driven ashore and severely damaged at Hobart.
Marie Fredericke	Flag unknown	The brig was wrecked on Heligoland before 7 March.
Marion	United Kingdom	The ship was wrecked on the Troubridge Shoal before 21 March.
Minnie	Norway	The ship capsized with the loss of all hands.
Nautilus	United Kingdom	The barque was driven ashore and severely damaged at Hobart.
Padama	United Kingdom	The ship was driven ashore and damaged at Hobart.
Petrel	United Kingdom	The steamship ran aground on the Hindert, in the North Sea off the Dutch coast. All on board, apart from her captain and three crew, were taken off, with those remaining on board abandoning ship on 31 March. She was on a voyage from Hull, Yorkshire to Rotterdam.
Pomaquid	United States	The ship was abandoned in the Atlantic Ocean before 19 March.
Russell Sturgess	United Kingdom	The ship was abandoned in the Atlantic Ocean. She was on a voyage from Liverpool to Boston, Massachusetts, United States.
San Antonio	Spain	The brig was driven ashore and wrecked near Gibraltar. She was on a voyage from Charleston, South Carolina, United States to Barcelona.
St. Johannes	Flag unknown	The ship sank before 4 March. She was on a voyage from Newcastle upon Tyne, Northumberland, United Kingdom to "Dwertheim".
Venus	United Kingdom	The tug was driven ashore on the Isle of Arran between 4 and 8 March. She was on a voyage from the Clyde to Australia.
