= Tugur (river) =

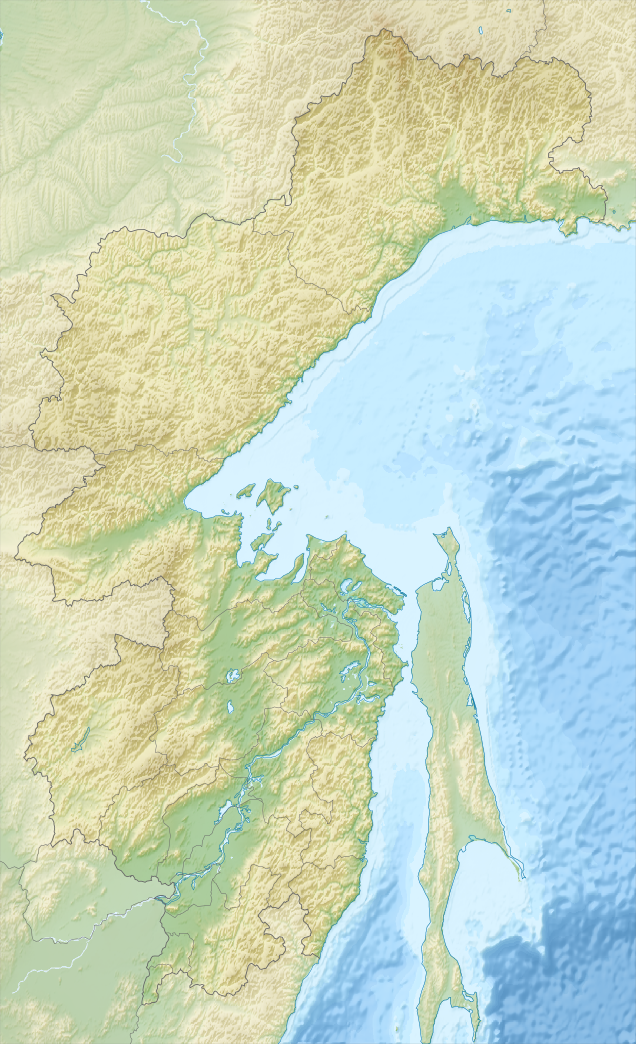
- Mouth location in Khabarovsk Krai, Russia
- Native name: Тугур (Russian)

Location
- Country: Russia

Physical characteristics
- Source: Confluence of rivers Assyni and Konin
  - coordinates: 53°4′21″N 136°1′50″E
- Mouth: Sea of Okhotsk
  - location: Tugur Bay
  - coordinates: 53°45′40″N 136°46′56″E
  - elevation: 0 m (0 ft)
- Length: 175 km (109 mi)
- Basin size: 11,900 km^{2} (4,600 sq mi)

The Tugur (Russian: Тугур) is a river in the Tuguro-Chumikansky District of Khabarovsk Krai, in the Russian Far East. It is 175 kilometres (109 mi) long, and has a drainage basin of 11,900 square kilometres (4,600 sq mi).

== Geography ==
The river originates at the confluence of the rivers Assyni (Ассыни) and Konin. It flows into a 30 km wide swampy area before ending in the Tugur Bay of the Sea of Okhotsk.

== Ecology ==
The Tugur is a good place for fishing, with species such as grayling, lenok, Siberian salmon, and northern pike being abundant in its waters and many species spawning in the river. There is also a great variety of wildlife on its banks, with brown bears, Manchurian wapiti, wolves, and otters. Among the birds the golden eagle, osprey, mergansers, and geese deserve mention.

== See also ==
- List of rivers of Russia
