= Tugur Bay =

Large bay in eastern Russia

- Shantar Bay
- Тугурский залив (Russian)
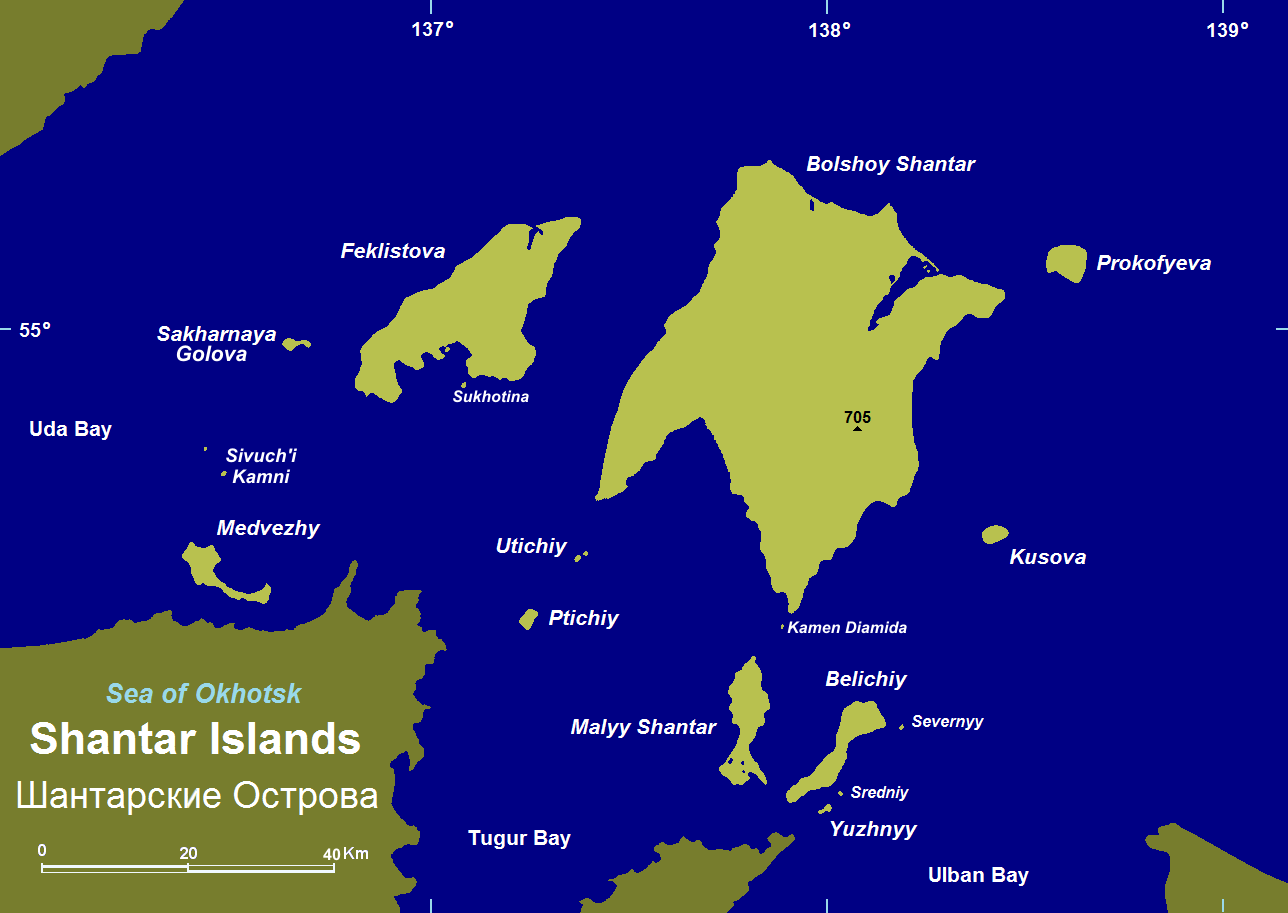
- Location of Tugur Bay south of the Shantar Islands

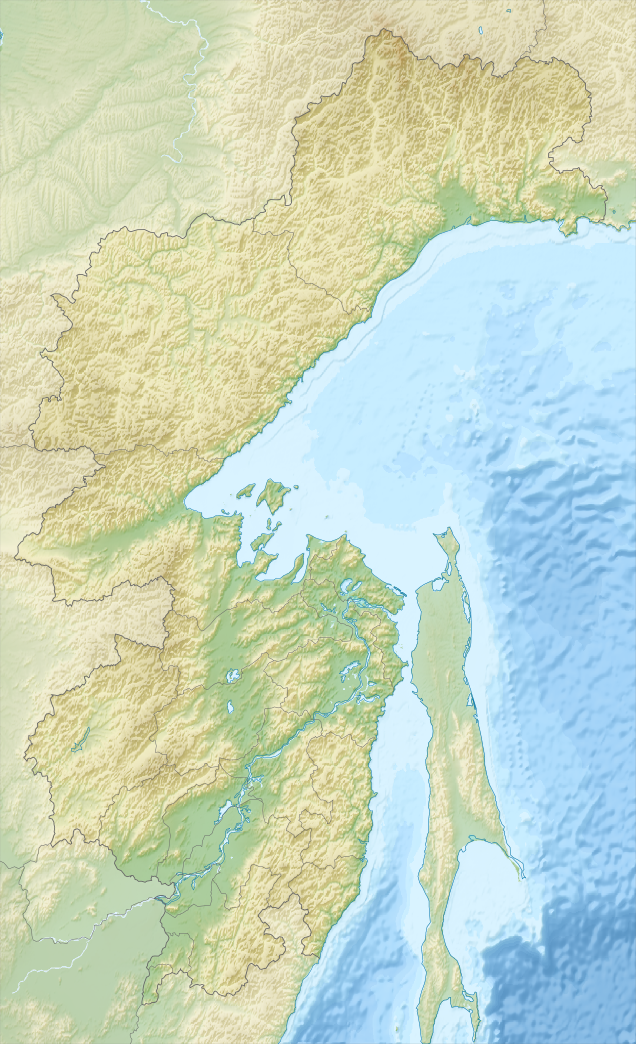
- Location in Khabarovsk Krai
- Location: Russian Far East
- Coordinates: 54°10′N 137°00′E
- River sources: Tugur River, Karol River
- Ocean/sea sources: Sea of Okhotsk
- Basin countries: Russia
- Max. length: 80.5 km (50.0 mi)
- Max. width: 58 km (36 mi)
- Surface area: 1,800 km^{2} (690 sq mi)
- Average depth: 25 m (82 ft)

Tugur Bay or Tugursky Bay (Russian: Тугурский залив, Tugursky Zaliv) is a large bay in the Tuguro-Chumikansky District of Khabarovsk Krai, Russian Federation.

As of 2009 there was a project to build a tidal power station in Tugur Bay.

== Geography ==
Tugur Bay is located in the northwestern Sea of Okhotsk, just south of the Shantar Islands. It is entered between Seneka Point and Cape Bol'shoy Dugandzha, nearly 58 km (about 36 mi) to the west-northwest. It narrows to about 19.3 km (12.0 mi) midway and is about 80.5 km (50.0 mi) deep in a south-southwesterly direction. The Tugur River runs into its head. The east and south side of the bay is thickly wooded.

Mamga Bay is a branch of Tugur Bay located on the northwestern side of the bay. On the eastern side of the bay are two prominent capes, Cape Bersen'yeva to the north and Cape Temnyy further south.

There is ice in the bay from the end of October or the middle of November to July. Spring tides rise 4.5 to 5.5 m (15 to 18 ft) in the northern part of the bay and up to 6.4 m (21 ft) in the southern part. Tidal currents can reach up to four knots in the northern part of Tugur Bay, causing whirlpools and eddies. The bay is 18 to 37 m (59 to 121 ft) deep at its entrance, but shoals to less than 3.6 m (12 ft) at its head.

== History ==
American, French, and Russian whaleships frequented the bay hunting bowhead whales between 1852 and 1905. They called it Shantar Bay. Some traded with the natives for salmon. On 28 July 1854, the bark Isabella, of New Bedford, reported that as many as 94 ships were visible from her deck while she was in the bay, only five of which were boiling oil. Several ships were wrecked in the bay. On 13 July 1854, the ship Silas Richards (454 tons), of New Bedford, Capt. Wilcox, was driven ashore by ice and wrecked on the east side of the bay near Cape Bersen'yeva. She was sold on the beach for $194. In June 1856, the brig Tarquina (210 tons), of Honolulu, was also stove by ice and lost, while the bark Columbus (344 tons), of New London, was wrecked in the bay on 10 August 1858. On 27 July 1867, a Russian steamer ordered the bark Java, of New Bedford, under Manuel Enos, out of the bay. A few days later the bark Endeavor, also of New Bedford, had its boats fired upon by the same vessel before being ordered away as well. In September 1875, a Russian steamer ordered away a Sydney whaleship from whaling in the bay. In August 1885, a Russian steamer once again forbid American whaleships in the bay from whaling.

Two whaling stations were also established in the bay to catch bowheads. The first was built in 1862 by the Russian-American Company on the southeastern point of Mamga Bay. In 1865, they sold it to Otto Wilhelm Lindholm, who had erected a station on the eastern side of the mouth of the Tugur River at the head of the bay two years earlier, in 1863. Both stations either utilized one or two schooners or boat crews provisioned for a fortnight at a time to cruise for whales in Tugur Bay or adjacent bays. The Tugur station was last used in 1870, while Mamga was used as a base for whaling until 1876. American whaleships visited Mamga to sell goods and receive repairs from ice damage.

== Wildlife ==
Bowhead whales, once abundant, are now rare in Tugur Bay. In the summer beluga whales aggregate at the head of the bay to feed on spawning salmon in the Tugur River estuary. Waders use the intertidal area at the head of the bay as a stopover during their summer-fall migration. The two most abundant species are great knot and Terek sandpiper.
