= List of ship launches in 1838 =

The list of ship launches in 1838 includes a chronological list of some ships launched in 1838.

Date	Ship	Class	Builder	Location	Country	Notes
6 January	Ruby	East Indiaman	George Hilhouse & Co.	Bristol	United Kingdom	For private owner.
11 January	Charente	Transport brig	Arsenal de Rochefort	Rochefort	France	For French Navy
12 January	Queen Victoria	Schooner	Messrs. Connell & Soms	Belfast	United Kingdom	For Messrs. Connell & Sons.
23 January	No. 10	Ship of the line		Alexandria	(Ottoman Empire) Egypt	For Egyptian Navy.
January	Carrs	Merchantman	T. Lightfoot	Sunderland	United Kingdom	For Carr & Co.
January	England	Snow	George Frater & Co.	Sunderland	United Kingdom	For Mr. Speeding.
1 February	Penelope	Schooner	McLaide	Belfast	United Kingdom	For Edward Lindsay Jr.
4 February	Reindeer	Steamship	Messrs. Wilson	Liverpool	United Kingdom	For Messrs. Langtry & Herdman.
10 February	City of York	Steamship	John Littleton	Selby	United Kingdom	For private owner.
12 February	The Fairy Queen	Schooner	Taylor	Woodbridge	United Kingdom	For Mr. Manby.
12 February	The Queen Victoria	Brig	Messrs. Bayley	Ipswich	United Kingdom	For Messrs. Cucknow & Co.
22 February	George Ramsay	Snow	Reed, Denton & Co.	Sunderland	United Kingdom	For J. Ritson.
26 February	Catherine Jamieon	Barque	Millar	Brucehaven	United Kingdom	For James Jamieson.
26 February	Jane Smith	Brig	Messrs. Buteman & Young	Leith	United Kingdom	For private owner.
26 February	Vest	Snow	Rodham & Todd	North Hylton	United Kingdom	For Young & Co.
February	Allison	Merchantman	Austin	Sunderland	United Kingdom	For Hartlepool Original Shipping Co.
February	James and Elizabeth	Merchantman	T. & N. Davie	Hylton	United Kingdom	For Mr. Harrison.
10 March	Samson	Steamship	Messrs. G. Lunell & Co	Hotwells	United Kingdom	For private owner.
12 March	Bartha	Brigantine schooner	Robert Innes	Leith	United Kingdom	For Messrs. John Dryden & Co.
13 March	Deva	Merchantman	William Gales	Hylton	United Kingdom	For Morris & Co.
14 March	Caledonia	Steamship	Messrs. Carmichael	Montrose	United Kingdom	For private owners.
14 March	Eleanor Russell	Barque	Bally	Shoreham-by-Sea	United Kingdom	For private owner.
17 March	Queen	Steamship	George Lunnell & Co	Hotwells	United Kingdom	For Bristol Steam Navigation Company.
23 March	William Adam	Steamship	Messrs. Menzies & Sons	Leith	United Kingdom	For private owner.
26 March	The City of Boulogne	Steamship		Barking	United Kingdom	For Commercial Steam Packet Company.
26 March	King of the Forest	Schooner	John Young	Newport	United Kingdom	For private owner.
26 March	Mariner	Schooner	John Westacott	Barnstaple	United Kingdom	For private owners.
26 March	Plantagenet	Steamship	Messrs. Smith	Newcastle upon Tyne	United Kingdom	For private owner.
26 March	Termagant	Cherokee-class brig-sloop		Portsmouth Dockyard	United Kingdom	For Royal Navy.
27 March	Skyridd Fawr	Schooner	Messrs. Batchelor & Co	Newport	United Kingdom	For private owner.
March	Druid	Snow	T. Ogden	Sunderland	United Kingdom	For Ogden & Co.
March	Kelloe	Merchantman	Peter Austin & Son	Sunderland	United Kingdom	For Austin & Co.
March	Petrel	Merchantman	J. Crown	Sunderland	United Kingdom	For Watson & Co.
March	Sapphiras	Snow		Sunderland	United Kingdom	For A. Brown.
2 April	Jane and Mary	Sloop	G. Flint	Mexborough	United Kingdom	For W. Amery.
10 April	Penguin	Alert-class brig		Pembroke Dockyard	United Kingdom	For Royal Navy.
16 April	Ardon	Mangishlak-class brig	S. N. Neverov	Astrakhan	Russia	For Imperial Russian Navy.
23 April	Cléopâtre	Artémise-class frigate	Charles Alexandre, Joseph Daviel and Georges Allix	Saint-Servan	France	For French Navy.
23 April	Petrel	Merchantman	Messrs. John Spence & Sons	Stockton-on-Tees	United Kingdom	For Commercial Shipping Company.
23 April	The Water Nymph	Schooner	Messrs. Read & Page	Ipswich	United Kingdom	For Mr. Jenkins & others.
24 April	Dandy	Yawl	Michael Ratsey	location	United Kingdom	For Colonel Madden.
24 April	Grecian	Acorn-class brig-sloop		Pembroke Dockyard	United Kingdom	For Royal Navy.
25 April	Salem	Schooner	William Jones	Alltvawr	United Kingdom	For private owner.
26 April	John Cree	Barque	L. Rose & Son	Leith	United Kingdom	For John Cree & partners.
30 April	Courier	Brig	William Bayley	Ipswich	United Kingdom	For private owner.
April	Chase	Merchantman	Calman	Dundee	United Kingdom	For private owner.
April	George Smith	Merchantman		Sunderland	United Kingdom	For G. Smith.
April	Harp	Merchantman	W. & A. Adamson	Sunderland	United Kingdom	For Shotton & Co.
April	Lady Anne	Merchantman	James Leithead	Sunderland	United Kingdom	For Mr. McDonald.
April	Lark	Merchantman	John M. Gales	Sunderland	United Kingdom	For Baker & Co.
April	Pacific	Merchantman	J. G. Holmes	Middlesbrough	United Kingdom	For William Fairbridge.
April	Rainbow	Merchantman	George Frater & Co	Sunderland	United Kingdom	For Thomas Speeding.
April	Robert Bowery	Brig	T. Rowntree	Sunderland, County Durham	United Kingdom	For private owner.
April	Skiron	Brig	William Byers	Sunderland	United Kingdom	For private owner.
April	Xanthus	Brig	Robert Thompson	North Biddick	United Kingdom	For George, Cuthbert and Elizabeth Richardson.
8 May	Eudora	Cutter yacht	Michael Ratsey	Cowes	United Kingdom	For R. W. Cooper.
9 May	Neker	Steamship	Messrs. Fairbairn & Co	Liverpool	United Kingdom	For private owner.
10 May	Harpy	Cutter	T. White	Cowes	United Kingdom	For Board of Customs.
10 May	Mary Coxon	Snow	Carr	Hylton	United Kingdom	For Coxon & Co.
10 May	Sarah	Schooner		Portaferry	United Kingdom	For William McLear Jr.
10 May	Wheatsheaf	Schooner	Parker	Wells-next-the-Sea	United Kingdom	For L. Corbet.
12 May	Greyhound	East Indiaman	Messrs. Hopper	Newcastle upon Tyne	United Kingdom	For private owner.
12 May	Tramp	Schooner	Robert Bartlett	Hotwells	United Kingdom	For private owner.
17 May	John Brotherick	Schooner	Thompson Smith	Newcastle upon Tyne	United Kingdom	For private owner.
23 May	Mary Brack	Merchantman	J. Watson	Sunderland	United Kingdom	For J. Cooper.
23 May	Peterel	Alert-class brig		Pembroke	United Kingdom	For Royal Navy.
24 May	British Queen	Paddle steamer	Curling, Young & Co.	Limehouse	United Kingdom	For British and American Steam Navigation Company.
24 May	Glowworm	Steam yacht	John Laird	North Birkenhead	United Kingdom	For Thomas Assheton Smith.
24 May	Menai Packet	Smack	Henry Moses	Port Madoc	United Kingdom	For private owner.
25 May	The Eliza	Barque	Messrs. William & John Campion	Whitby	United Kingdom	For John Campion.
26 May	Earl of Hardwicke	East Indiaman	Green & Co.	Blackwall	United Kingdom	For Richard Green.
31 May	Charlotte Atkinson	Smack	Macdonald	Londonderry	United Kingdom	For Lessees of the Honourable Irish Society's Fisheries.
May	Andrew White	Merchantman	T. Cairncross, or Bell & Cairncross	Sunderland	United Kingdom	For Mr. Thompson.
May	Lively	Lighter		Portsmouth Dockyard	United Kingdom	For Royal Navy.
May	Mary	Victualling Hoy		Woolwich Dockyard	United Kingdom	For Royal Navy.
May	Pilgrim	Schooner	Simpson	Glasson Dock	United Kingdom	For private owner.
May	Premier	Barque		Quebec	(United Kingdom of Great Britain and Ireland) Upper Canada	For private owner.
May	Venture	Merchantman	F. Oliver	Sunderland	United Kingdom	For T. Oliver.
9 June	Pilot	Acorn-class brig-sloop		Plymouth Dockyard	United Kingdom	For Royal Navy.
13 June	Hydra	Hydra-class sloop		Chatham Dockyard	United Kingdom	For Royal Navy.
16 June	Aurora	Cutter yacht	Michael Ratsey	Cowes	United Kingdom	For Colonel Beach.
19 June	Crusader	Schooner	T. Gales	Sunderland	United Kingdom	For Union Shipping Co.
22 June	Coquette	Corvette		Saint-Malo	France	For French Navy.
28 June	Darlington	Schooner	John & Luke Crown	Sunderland	United Kingdom	For Stockton & London Shipping Company.
June	Defiance	Merchantman	Kirkbride & Carruthers	Sunderland	United Kingdom	For Ord & Co.
June	England's Queen	Snow	Tate & Taylor	Sunderland	United Kingdom	For Port of Newcastle General Shipping Company.
June	Friends	Snow	James Leithead	Sunderland	United Kingdom	For Mr. Middleton.
June	Grace	Merchantman	T. S. Dixon	Sunderland	United Kingdom	For T. S. Dixon.
June	Isabella	East Indiaman	Edward Gibson	Hull	United Kingdom	For private owner.
June	Matthew	Snow	Peter Austin	Sunderland	United Kingdom	For Mr. Matthew.
7 July	Delhi	Barque	Balley	Shoreham-by-Sea	United Kingdom	For private owner.
7 July	Robert F. Stockton	Tow-boat	John Laird	North Birkenhead	United Kingdom	For Delaware and Rariton Canal.
9 July	Dawson	Merchantman	Messrs. William Henzell & Son	Seaham	United Kingdom	For Thomas Nicholson & Robert Scurfield.
9 July	Phillyra	Schooner	Messrs. Harris & Challacombe	Ilfracombe	United Kingdom	For private owner.
10 July	Iris	Packet ship		Hull	United Kingdom	For private owner.
10 July	Nautilus	Cutter yacht	Hunt	Aldeburgh	United Kingdom	For Town Committee of Aldeburgh.
11 July	St. Regulus	Merchantman	Messrs. Menzies	Leith	United Kingdom	For St. Andrew's & Leith Shipping Company.
23 July	Allerton Packet	Merchantman	Thomas Brown	Stockton-on-Tees	United Kingdom	For Merchant's Shipping Company.
23 July	Monarch	Schooner	William Bayley	Ipswich	United Kingdom	For A. Gallaway.
July	Atlas	Merchantman	Rodham & Todd	Sunderland	United Kingdom	For T. & R. Brown.
July	Barnard Castle	Schooner	Robert Thompson	Sunderland	United Kingdom	For Stockton and London Shipping Company.
July	Dalston	Merchantman	W. Wilkinson	Sunderland	United Kingdom	For T. Reed.
July	Flower of Ugie	Barque	Luke Crown	Sunderland	United Kingdom	For J. Bruce & Company.
July	Henry Cotes	Merchantman	John Rodgerson	South Hylton	United Kingdom	For John Coates, Thomas Solsby & George Murray.
July	John	Merchantman		Sunderland	United Kingdom	For Mr Pattison.
July	Keepier	Schooner	Edward Brown	Sunderland	United Kingdom	For John Ray.
6 August	Daphne	Daphne-class corvette		Pembroke Dockyard	United Kingdom	For Royal Navy.
8 August	James Audus	Brigantine	Samuel Gutteridge	Selby	United Kingdom	For private owner.
9 August	Persia	East Indiaman	Messrs. W. J. & R. Tindall	Scarborough	United Kingdom	For private owner.
17 August	Loudovikos	Corvette		Poros	Greece	For Royal Hellenic Navy.
23 August	Acheron	Hermes-class sloop		Sheerness Dockyard	United Kingdom	For Royal Navy.
25 August	The Science	Merchantman	Messrs. Youngs	South Shields	United Kingdom	For private owner.
28 August	Trekh Ierarkhov	Sultan Makhmud-class ship of the line	S. I. Chernyavskiy	Nicholaieff	Russia	For Imperial Russian Navy.
28 August	Tri Svyatitelya	First rate	Vorobyov	Nicholaieff	Russia	For Imperial Russian Navy.
August	Auckland	Schooner	J. Barkes	Sunderland	United Kingdom	For Stockton and London Shipping Company.
August	Mary Ann	Snow		Sunderland	United Kingdom	For Forster & Co.
4 September	Eleanor	Barque	James Smith	Saint John	(United Kingdom of Great Britain and Ireland) Colony of New Brunswick	For private owner.
6 September	Eleven	Snow	J. & G. Mills	Sunderland	United Kingdom	For London & Newcastle Shipping Co.
12 September	John and Mary	Schooner	W. Harrison	Hull	United Kingdom	For Mr. Pearson.
18 September	Merlin	Merlin-class packet boat		Pembroke Dockyard	United Kingdom	For Royal Navy.
19 September	Briton's Pride	Schooner	Messrs. Bayley & Co.	Ipswich	United Kingdom	For Mr. Scott and others.
20 September	Florist	Merchantman	Perkins	Newport	United Kingdom	For private owner.
29 September	Joseph Wallace	Schooner	Barker	Great Yarmouth	United Kingdom	For private owner.
September	England's Queen	Snow	T. Lanchester	Sunderland	United Kingdom	For Alcock & Co.
September	Friends	Merchantman	F. Oliver	Sunderland	United Kingdom	For Mr. Oliver.
September	Robert Henderson	Barque		Sunderland	United Kingdom	For Mr. Henderson.
September	Skipton	Snow	J. Crown, or Walker & Crone	Sunderland	United Kingdom	For Newcastle Shipping Company.
September	Tweed	Merchantman	G. Thompson	Sunderland	United Kingdom	For Mr. Longstaff.
2 October	Dew Drop	Schooner	Messrs John & William Campion	Whitby	United Kingdom	For Messrs. J. Storm and Coggan.
3 October	Elizabeth	Merchantman	George Metcalf	South Shields	United Kingdom	For private owner.
4 October	Chili	Frigate	Courreau & Arman	Bordeaux	France	For Chilean Navy.
4 October	The Patchett	Schooner	Atkinson	Goole	United Kingdom	For Messrs. Ibbotson, Lister & Co.
5 October	William and Sarah	Schooner	Messrs. Kirwan & McCune	Belfast	United Kingdom	For William Massey.
8 October	Aurora	Paddle steamer	Charles Connell & Sons	Belfast	United Kingdom	For private owner
18 October	Archimedes	Steamship	Henry Wimshurst	London	United Kingdom	For Ship Propeller Company.
18 October	Ironsides	Full-rigged ship	Messrs. Jackson, Gordon & Co	Liverpool	United Kingdom	For private owner.
18 October	Rosalie	Brig	J. W. Green	Dartmouth	United Kingdom	For R. Alsop.
20 October	Miranda	Schooner	Thomas White	West Cowes	United Kingdom	For private owner.
26 October	Sarah Maria Ann	Schooner	Messrs William & Richard Roberts	Newport	United Kingdom	For Messrs. Thomas Wall & Co.
31 October	Medusa	Merlin-class packet boat		Pembroke Dockyard	United Kingdom	For Royal Navy.
October	Bewley	Merchantman	H. Penman	Sunderland	United Kingdom	For Penman & Co.
October	Martindale	Snow	T. & N. Davie	Sunderland	United Kingdom	For Hartlepool & Durham Com. Sh. Co.
October	Robert Henry Allen	Merchantman	George Frater	Sunderland	United Kingdom	For Hartford & Durham Commercial Shipping Company.
1 November	Benjamin Greene	Barque	Laing & Simey	Southwick	United Kingdom	For Greene & Co.
3 November	Pazo de Ragoe	Merchantman	John Vaux	Newcastle upon Tyne	United Kingdom	For private owner.
7 November	Scotland	East Indiaman	John Scott & Sons	Greenock	United Kingdom	For William Morrison & other.
10 November	Daldia	Steamship		River Thames	United Kingdom	For Newcastle and Shields Steam Packet Company.
15 November	Acorn	Acorn-class brig-sloop		Devonport Dockyard	United Kingdom	For Royal Navy.
20 November	Grace Darling	Brig		Perth	United Kingdom	For private owner.
30 November	Aid	Lighter		location	United Kingdom	For Royal Navy.
November	Governor	Merchantman	Thomas Ogden	Sunderland	United Kingdom	For Mr. Spaight.
November	Lady Bute	Barque		Greenock	United Kingdom	For private owner
November	Sheraton Grange	Merchantman	James Carr	Sunderland	United Kingdom	For Robert Liddell.
8 December	Countess of Caledon	Steamship	Coates & Young	Belfast	United Kingdom	For private owner.
14 December	No. 12	Ship of the line		Alexandria	(Ottoman Empire) Egypt	For Egyptian Navy.
18 December	Monro	Brig	Messrs. Butiment & Young	Leith	United Kingdom	For private owner.
19 December	Royal Sovereign	Steamship	Messrs. Hedderwick & Rankin	Glasgow	United Kingdom	For private owner.
December	Pomona	Brig		Aberdeen	United Kingdom	For private owner.
Unknown date	Abbotsford	Merchantman	J. & G. Mills	Sunderland	United Kingdom	For Mr. Chambers.
25 December	Charlotte	Schooner	Robert Symons	Penzance	United Kingdom	For Robert Symons.
Unknown date	Advena	Snow	William Potts	Sunderland	United Kingdom	For W. Potts.
Unknown date	Agenoria	Schooner	John Ball Jr.	Salcombe	United Kingdom	For Hugh Narramore and others.
Unknown date	Alabama	Paddle steamer		Baltimore, Maryland	United States	For United States Navy.
Unknown date	Ann	Snow		Sunderland	United Kingdom	For private owner.
Unknown date	Anne Laing	Merchantman	Laing & Simey	Sunderland	United Kingdom	For P. Laing & Co.
Unknown date	Ann Emma	Merchantman		Sunderland	United Kingdom	For Hartlepool Union Shipping Company.
Unknown date	Arcturus	Merchantman		Sunderland	United Kingdom	For Given & Co.
Unknown date	Arrietta	Merchantman	Laing & Simey	Sunderland	United Kingdom	For P. Laing & Co.
Unknown date	Augusta	Schooner	Frederick Baddeley	Brixham	United Kingdom	For Frederick Baddeley.
Unknown date	Beacon	Snow		Sunderland	United Kingdom	For Mr. Nicholson.
Unknown date	Belford	Merchantman	George Thompson	Sunderland	United Kingdom	For Mr. Thompson.
Unknown date	Brandon	Merchantman	George Thompson	Sunderland	United Kingdom	For Mr. Alderson.
Unknown date	Britannia	Merchantman	T. B. Simey	Sunderland	United Kingdom	For Milbro & Lon Co.
Unknown date	British Oak	Merchantman	R. Bell	Sunderland	United Kingdom	For J. Bell.
Unknown date	Caledonia	Snow	H. Dobbinson	Sunderland	United Kingdom	For Mid. & Lon. Sh. Co.
Unknown date	Caroline	Snow		Sunderland	United Kingdom	For T. Rowell.
Unknown date	Cauvery	Brig		Bombay	India	For Bombay Pilot Service.
Unknown date	City of Adelaide	Barque			Jersey	For private owner.
Unknown date	City of Rochester	Merchantman	Bartram & Lister	Sunderland	United Kingdom	For Hayman & Co.
Unknown date	Chieftain	Merchantman	George Thompson	Sunderland	United Kingdom	For Mr. Ness.
Unknown date	Clio	Barque		Granville	(United Kingdom of Great Britain and Ireland) Colony of Nova Scotia	For private owner.
Unknown date	Colleron	Brig		Bombay	India	For Bombay Pilot Service.
Unknown date	Crown	Merchantman	Bartram & Lister	Sunderland	United Kingdom	For William Thompson.
Unknown date	Constance	Schooner	Gervase Coachman	Bombay	India	For Royal Navy.
Unknown date	Daylight	Paddle steamer	Ditchburn & Mare	Blackwall	United Kingdom	For private owner.
Unknown date	Dorset	Brig	William Field Porter	Liverpool	United Kingdom	For private owner.
Unknown date	Eagle	Brig		Sunderland	United Kingdom	For Walker & Co.
Unknown date	Elizabeth Adnett	Snow		Sunderland	United Kingdom	For T. Farrell.
Unknown date	Elizabeth Holmes	Snow	Robert Thompson	Sunderland	United Kingdom	For William Holmes.
Unknown date	Elizabeth Thompson	Snow	John M. Gales	Sunderland	United Kingdom	For Turner Thompson & associates.
Unknown date	Ellen	Barque		Sunderland	United Kingdom	For Mr. Buchanan.
Unknown date	Equitable	Barque		Sunderland	United Kingdom	For Graham & Co.
Unknown date	Fanny	Snow	Rowntree	Sunderland	United Kingdom	For R. Robson.
Unknown date	Ford Mill	Merchantman	J. Rodgerson	Sunderland	United Kingdom	For J. Vint.
Unknown date	Hart	Snow		Sunderland	United Kingdom	For Hartlepool Union Shipping Company.
Unknown date	Hercules	Paddle steamer		Liverpool	United Kingdom	For St George Steam Packet Company.
Unknown date	Indus	Merchantman		Sunderland	United Kingdom	For H. Moon.
Unknown date	Iowa	Paddle steamer			(United States) Territory of Iowa	For private owner.
Unknown date	Iris	Paddle steamer	Brownlow, Pearson & Co.	Hull	United Kingdom	For W. B. Brownlow.
Unknown date	Isaac Allerton	Merchantman		Portsmouth, New Hampshire	United States	For private owner.
Unknown date	John Rickinson	Merchantman		Sunderland	United Kingdom	For Mr. Rickinson.
Unknown date	Lively	Snow		Sunderland	United Kingdom	For private owner.
Unknown date	Lord Willoughby	Schooner			United Kingdom	For private owner.
Unknown date	Mabel	Snow		Sunderland	United Kingdom	For Grey & Co.
Unknown date	Madagascar	paddle Steamer	Blyth & Sons	London	United Kingdom	For private owner.
Unknown date	Musica	Merchantman	Peter Austin	Sunderland	United Kingdom	For Austin & Co.
Unknown date	Neptune	Merchantman	Alcock	Sunderland	United Kingdom	For Mr. Fenwick.
Unknown date	New Tredger	Sloop		Newport	United Kingdom	For private owner.
Unknown date	North Briton	Snow		Sunderland	United Kingdom	For Hay & Co.
Unknown date	Oberon	Snow	Tiffin	Sunderland	United Kingdom	For Garbutt & Co.
Unknown date	Old England	Full-rigged ship		Sunderland	United Kingdom	For Mr. Rowlinson.
Unknown date	Ophelia & Mary	Merchantman	T. & N. Davie	Sunderland	United Kingdom	For White & Co.
Unknown date	Orion	Snow	W. Wilkinson	Sunderland	United Kingdom	For Mr. Peacock.
Unknown date	Orphan's Friend	Snow	H. & W. Carr	Sunderland	United Kingdom	For Mr. Sharp.
Unknown date	Othon	Paddle steamer		Poros	Greece	For Royal Hellenic Navy.
Unknown date	Paragon	Snow	Cuthbert Potts	Sunderland	United Kingdom	For Union Shipping Company.
Unknown date	Patriot	Merchantman		Sunderland	United Kingdom	For Mr. Patterson.
Unknown date	Percival Foster	Merchantman	S. & P. Mills	Sunderland	United Kingdom	For Hartlepool & Durham Commercial Shipping Co.
Unknown date	Premium	Merchantman	James Leithead	Sunderland	United Kingdom	For Newcastle Shipping Company.
Unknown date	Prosperous	Sloop	William Bonker	Salcombe	United Kingdom	For Nicholas Prettyjohn and others.
Unknown date	Queen	Merchantman	H. Dobbinson	Sunderland	United Kingdom	For Penman & Co.
Unknown date	Queen	Schooner	William Bayley	Ipswich	United Kingdom	For private owner.
Unknown date	Queen Victoria	Paddle steamer	Wilson	Glasgow	United Kingdom	For City of Dublin Steam Packet Company.
Unknown date	Reward	Snow	Allcock	Sunderland	United Kingdom	For Mr. Scurfield.
Unknown date	Romance	Merchantman	John M. Gales	Sunderland	United Kingdom	For John M. Gales.
Unknown date	Sarah	Barque			(United Kingdom of Great Britain and Ireland) Colony of Nova Scotia	For private owner.
Unknown date	Schiedam	Snow	W. Petrie	Sunderland	United Kingdom	For Hartlepool Original Shipping Company.
Unknown date	Seven	Merchantman		Hylton	United Kingdom	For London & Newcastle Shipping Co.
Unknown date	Shepherd	Snow		Sunderland	United Kingdom	For Mr. Wilkinson.
Unknown date	Shincliffe	Snow	Rowntree	Sunderland	United Kingdom	For Mr. Hodgson.
Unknown date	Sirius	Paddle steamer			United Kingdom	For St. George Steam-packet Co.
Unknown date	Six	Merchantman		Sunderland	United Kingdom	For London, Newcastle & South Shields Shipping Co.
Unknown date	Snake	Steamship		Bombay	India	For British East India Company.
Unknown date	Sovereign	Snow	S. & P. Mills	Sunderland	United Kingdom	For Linskill & Co.
Unknown date	Spring	Snow	J. & G. Mills	Sunderland	United Kingdom	For Mr. Thompson.
Unknown date	Stephen Thompson	Snow	W. Chilton	Sunderland	United Kingdom	For Watson & Co.
Unknown date	Sylph	Paddle steamer	Maudslay, Sons and Field	Lambeth	United Kingdom	For Woolwich Packet Co.
Unknown date	Tasso	Brig		Sunderland	United Kingdom	For Mr Cropper.
Unknown date	Thirteen	Brig		Sunderland	United Kingdom	For London & Newcastle Shipping Co.
Unknown date	Thomas Oliver	Brig	J. Stobart	Sunderland	United Kingdom	For R. Oliver.
Unknown date	Triton	Snow		Sunderland	United Kingdom	For Commercial Shipping Company.
Unknown date	Undaunted	Snow		Sunderland	United Kingdom	For Mr. Hillyard.
Unknown date	Venus	full-rigged ship		Rotterdam	Netherlands	For Royal Netherlands Navy.
Unknown date	Victory	Schooner	William Bonker	Salcombe	United Kingdom	For Robert Hurrell and others.
Unknown date	Viscount Lambton	Snow		Sunderland	United Kingdom	For Forster & Co.
Unknown date	Vulcan	Brig	Bowman and Drummond	Blyth	United Kingdom	For Mr. Longridge.
Unknown date	Wave	Brig		Victoria	(United Kingdom of Great Britain and Ireland) Bermuda	For private owner.
Unknown date	Wear	Brig		Sunderland	United Kingdom	For White & Co.
Unknown date	Welcome	Merchantman	Joshua Helmsley	Sunderland	United Kingdom	For White & Co.
Unknown date	Welcome	Merchantman	George Thompson	Sunderland	United Kingdom	For Mr. Thompson.
Unknown date	William Pitt	Merchantman	Peter Austin	Sunderland	United Kingdom	For Palmer & Co.
