= List of shipwrecks in October 1841 =

The list of shipwrecks in October 1841 includes ships sunk, foundered, wrecked, grounded, or otherwise lost during October 1841.

== 1 October ==
List of shipwrecks: 1 October 1841
Ship	State	Description
Dee	United Kingdom	The barque was wrecked in St. George's Bay. Her crew were rescued. She was on a voyage from Quebec City, Province of Canada, British North America to Aberdeen.
Maria	France	The ship was run into by a chasse-marée and sank in the Seine. She was on a voyage from Rouen, Seine-Inférieure to Wismar.

== 2 October ==
List of shipwrecks: 2 October 1841
Ship	State	Description
Coural	Courland Governorate	The ship was driven ashore at Plymouth, Massachusetts, United States. She was on a voyage from Libava to Boston, Massachusetts. Coural was later refloated.
Peggy	United Kingdom	The sloop was wrecked at Cardigan. She was on a voyage from Caernarfon to Milford Haven, Pembrokeshire.
Sophia	United Kingdom	The full-rigged ship was wrecked in the Bay of Islands with the loss of 30 of the 41 people on board.

== 3 October ==
List of shipwrecks: 3 October 1841
Ship	State	Description
Altair	United States	The October gale of 1841: The fishing schooner was lost on the Nantucket Shoals. All six crew killed.
Arrival	United States	The October gale of 1841: The fishing schooner was lost on the Nantucket Shoals. Lost with all nine hands.
Bride	United States	The October gale of 1841: The fishing schooner was driven ashore. All eight crewmen was killed.
Cinncinatus	United States	The October gale of 1841: The fishing schooner was lost on the Nantucket Shoals. Lost with all ten hands.
Colma	United States	The October gale of 1841: The fishing schooner was wrecked and went to pieces on Horseshoe Shoal, Nantucket Sound.
Conrad Savin	Prussia	The ship was driven ashore at Plymouth, Massachusetts, United States. She was on a voyage from Liebau to Boston, Massachusetts. She was later refloated.
Dalmatian	United States	The October gale of 1841: The fishing schooner was lost on the Nantucket Shoals. Lost with all ten hands.
Dorothea	Prussia	The ship ran aground off "Eckhoff". She was on a voyage from Visby, Sweden to Kiel. Dorothea was refloated on 6 January 1842.
Ellis	United States	The October gale of 1841: The fishing schooner was driven ashore on the east side of Truro, Massachusetts, north of the Highland Light. All nine crewmen were killed.
Franklin	United States	The October gale of 1841: The fishing schooner capsized at sea and went ashore at Hyannisport, Massachusetts. Her cook and a crewman were killed.
General Harrison	United States	The October gale of 1841: The fishing schooner was lost on the Nantucket Shoals. Lost with all hands.
Ida	United States	The October gale of 1841: The fishing schooner was lost in the area of Nantucket Sound.
Industry	Nova Scotia	The October gale of 1841: The schooner was driven ashore on the east side of Truro, Massachusetts, north of the Highland Light. Three crewmen were killed.
Maine	United States	The October gale of 1841: The vessel broke loose from her moorings and was wrecked on the beach at Scituate, Massachusetts. Her captain, his daughter, five passengers and one crewman were killed.
Nancy	United States	The October gale of 1841: The fishing schooner was sunk on, or near, the breakwater at Hyannis, Massachusetts.
Pomona	United States	The October gale of 1841: The fishing schooner capsized at sea and washed into the harbor of Nauset, Cape Cod with the bodies of three crew in a cabin. All eight hands lost.
Prince Albert	United States	The October gale of 1841: The fishing schooner was lost on the Nantucket Shoals. Lost with all eight hands.
Spitfire	Nova Scotia	The October gale of 1841: The schooner was wrecked one-half mile (0.80 km) below Race Point. Her captain, a female passenger, and two crewmen were killed.
Susan	United States	The October gale of 1841: The fishing schooner went ashore and was lost near Great Island.

== 4 October ==
List of shipwrecks: 4 October 1841
Ship	State	Description
Allegro	Prussia	The brig was lost in Gronsound. She was on a voyage from London, United Kingdom to Stettin.
Asia	United States	The October gale of 1841: The fishing schooner was lost in the area of Nantucket Sound.
Delphin	Belgium	The ship was driven ashore at Cimbrishamn, Sweden and was wrecked. She was on a voyage from Riga, Russia to Ghent, West Flanders.
Forest	United States	The October gale of 1841: The fishing schooner was wrecked on Cape Cod at Chatham, Massachusetts. All eight crew were killed.
Four O'Clock	United States	The October gale of 1841: The fishing schooner was lost in the area of Nantucket Sound.
Galeatse	Sweden	The ship was driven ashore at "Kelolck". She was on a voyage from Stockholm to Cimbritshamn.
Government	United States	The October gale of 1841: The fishing schooner was lost in the area of Nantucket Sound.
Guardian	United Kingdom	The ship was driven ashore near Køge, Denmark. She was on a voyage from London to Memel, Prussia. Guardian was later refloated. She was consequently condemned.
Horace	United States	The October gale of 1841: The fishing schooner was lost in the area of Nantucket Sound.
Hyannis	United States	The October gale of 1841: The fishing schooner was lost in the area of Nantucket Sound.
Isabella	United Kingdom	The brig ran aground on the Westflats, off the coast of Zeeland, Netherlands. Her crew survived.
Liberty	United States	The October gale of 1841: The fishing schooner was sunk/lost on Bishop and Clerks Shoal, Nantucket Sound.
Lion	United States	The October gale of 1841: The fishing schooner was stranded, lost on the bar of Bass River, Massachusetts.
Malden	United States	The October gale of 1841: The fishing schooner was lost in the area of Nantucket Sound.
Margaret and Mary	United Kingdom	The ship sank off "Boners". She was refloated on 16 October and taken into Boners.
Marys	United Kingdom	The ship was abandoned off the Saltee Islands, County Wexford. She was on a voyage from the Orkney Islands to Cork.
Munroe	United States	The October gale of 1841: The fishing schooner stranded and went to pieces on Point Gammon.
Nordsterne	Rostock	The ship capsized at Warnemünde with the loss of a crew member. She subsequently righted and drove ashore.
Olive	United States	The October gale of 1841: The fishing schooner was lost in the area of Nantucket Sound.
Page	United States	The October gale of 1841: The fishing schooner was lost in the area of Nantucket Sound.
Phoebe Ann	United States	The October gale of 1841: The fishing schooner was lost in the area of Nantucket Sound.
Tre Venner	Danzig	The ship was driven ashore and wrecked near Ystad, Sweden. She was on a voyage from Danzig to Rochefort, Charente-Maritime, France.
Union	United States	The October gale of 1841: The fishing schooner was lost in the area of Nantucket Sound.
Unknown schooner	United States	The October gale of 1841: The fishing schooner was lost two miles (3.2 km) south west of Bishop and Clerks Shoal, Nantucket Sound.
Van Buren	United States	The October gale of 1841: The fishing schooner was lost in the area of Nantucket Sound.

== 5 October ==
List of shipwrecks: 5 October 1841
Ship	State	Description
Bolivar	United Kingdom	The ship was driven ashore in Kioge Bay. She was on a voyage from Hull, Yorkshire to Saint Petersburg, Russia. Bolivar was refloated on 10 October and taken into Copenhagen, Denmark.
Friedrike	Russia	The ship was driven ashore on Bornholm, Denmark. She was on a voyage from Riga to Ghent, West Flanders, Belgium.
Garnet	United States	The October gale of 1841: The dismasted fishing schooner was scuttled off Neversink, New Jersey. The crew were taken off by the packet Roscius (United Kingdom).
George	United Kingdom	The ship was driven ashore at Spittal Point, Northumberland. She was refloated the next day.
Gode Hope	Netherlands	The galiot was wrecked on the Herd Sand, in the North Sea off the coast of County Durham, United Kingdom with the loss of one life. Survivors were rescued by HMRC Raven ( Board of Customs), the North Shields Lifeboat and South Shields Lifeboat.
Guardian	United Kingdom	The ship was driven ashore near Køge, Denmark. She was refloated on 10 October and taken into Copenhagen.
Isabella	United Kingdom	The ship was wrecked on the West Plaat, in the North Sea off the coast of South Holland, Netherlands. Her crew were rescued.
Johannes	Netherlands	The ship was driven ashore and wrecked near Frederikshavn, Denmark. Her crew were rescued. She was on a voyage from "Kurtemünde" to Amsterdam, North Holland.
Julia	United Kingdom	The ship collided with Gloria (Russia) and foundered 30 nautical miles (56 km) off Cádiz, Spain. Two crew were rescued by Gloria. Julia was on a voyage from Trieste to Liverpool, Lancashire.
Regent	United Kingdom	The ship ran aground on the Herd Sand. She was refloated and beached on the Scalp.
Wager	United Kingdom	The ship was driven ashore and damaged at Stromness, Orkney Islands. She was on a voyage from Liverpool, Lancashire to Stettin. Wager was refloated.
Whitby Lifeboat	United Kingdom	The lifeboat capsized at Whitby, Yorkshire with the loss of four lives. One survivor was rescued after a hole was cut in the boat's bottom.

== 6 October ==
List of shipwrecks: 6 October 1841
Ship	State	Description
Belvidere	United Kingdom	The ship ran aground and was damaged on the Goodwin Sands, Kent. She was on a voyage from Quebec City, Province of Canada, British North America to Sunderland, County Durham. Belvidere was refloated and towed into Ramsgate, Kent by the steamship Royal Adelaide (United Kingdom).
Helena	Bremen	The ship foundered in the North Sea off the coast of Northumberland, United Kingdom with the loss of all hands.
Johns	United Kingdom	The ship was wrecked at Arkhangelsk, Russia. She was on a voyage from Arkhangelsk to Dundee, Forfarshire.
Mary Gray	United Kingdom	The ship ran aground in the Swine Bottoms. She was on a voyage from Grangemouth, Stirlingshire to Stettin. Mary Gray was refloated and taken into Helsingør, Denmark.
Mersey	United Kingdom	The ship was wrecked on Cape Sable Island, Nova Scotia, British North America with the loss of two of her crew. She was on a voyage from Tatmagouche, Nova Scotia to Liverpool.
Nancy	United Kingdom	The ship was abandoned in the Atlantic Ocean. Her crew were rescued by Eliza and Rebecca (United Kingdom). Nancy was on a voyage from Gloucester to Saint Andrews, New Brunswick, British North America.
Respect	United Kingdom	The collier, a brig, foundered in the English Channel off Calais, France. Her seven crew were rescued by HMS Dover (Royal Navy). Respect was on a voyage from Sunderland, County Durham to Calais.
Temperance	United Kingdom	The ship departed from Margate, Kent for Liverpool, Lancashire. No further trace, presumed foundered with the loss of all hands.
Thetis	United Kingdom	The ship was driven ashore near Landskrona, Sweden. She was on a voyage from Hull, Yorkshire to Saint Petersburg, Russia. Thetis was refloated and put into Helsingør.
Thomas Ritchie	United Kingdom	The ship was driven ashore and wrecked at Little Bras d'Or, Nova Scotia, British North America.
Triton	United Kingdom	The ship was driven ashore at Point Escuminac, New Brunswick, British North America. She had been refloated by 30 October.

== 7 October ==
List of shipwrecks: 7 October 1841
Ship	State	Description
Concord	(United Kingdom of Great Britain and Ireland) British North America	The brig was abandoned in the Atlantic Ocean. Her crew were rescued by Sirne (United States). Concord was on a voyage from Windsor, Nova Scotia to Newhaven, Connecticut, United States.
Emma	United Kingdom	The ship was driven ashore at Warnemünde. She was on a voyage from Hartlepool, County Durham to Rostock. She was refloated the next day and towed into Warnemünde.
Felicity	United Kingdom	The ship sprang a leak and was beached at Grimsby, Lincolnshire. She was on a voyage from South Shields, County Durham to King's Lynn, Norfolk. Following repairs, she was refloated and resumed her voyage.
Hexham	United Kingdom	The ship was driven ashore near Præstø, Denmark. She was on a voyage from Sunderland, County Durham to Memel, Prussia. Hexham was refloated and taken into Copenhagen, Denmark.
John	United Kingdom	The ship was driven ashore on the Swedish coast. She was on a voyage from Newcastle upon Tyne, Northumberland to Saint Petersburg, Russia. John was refloated the next day and resumed her voyage.
Mount Charles	United Kingdom	The schooner ran aground on the Kentish Knock and was abandoned by her crew. She was on a voyage from Fowey, Cornwall to Sunderland. Mount Charles was later refloated and taken into Great Yarmouth, Norfolk.
Urania	United Kingdom	The ship was wrecked on the West Hoyle Bank, in Liverpool Bay. All on board, over 250 people, were rescued. She was on a voyage from Liverpool, Lancashire to Sydney, New South Wales.

== 8 October ==
List of shipwrecks: 8 October 1841
Ship	State	Description
Anne	United Kingdom	The barque ran aground on the Chapman Sand, in the Thames Estuary off the coast of Kent. She was on a voyage from Quebec City, Province of Canada, British North America to London.
Dart	United Kingdom	The schooner was driven ashore at Sunderland, County Durham. She was on a voyage from London to Sunderland.
Experiment	Denmark	The ship was driven ashore on Dragør. She was on a voyage from Copenhagen to Lisbon, Portugal.
Lord Melville	United Kingdom	The ship was driven ashore at Newhaven, Sussex. She was on a voyage from Bristol, Gloucestershire to Hastings, Sussex. Lord Melville was refloated and taken into Newhaven.

== 9 October ==
List of shipwrecks: 9 October 1841
Ship	State	Description
Matilde	Belgium	The ship was wrecked on the Zouklande Bank, in the North Sea off the coast of Zeeland, Netherlands with the loss of a crew member. She was on a voyage from Saint Petersburg, Russia to Antwerp.

== 10 October ==
List of shipwrecks: 10 October 1841
Ship	State	Description
Amethyst	United Kingdom	The brig ran aground on the Inner Barber Sand, in the North Sea. She was on a voyage from London to Hartlepool, County Durham. Amethyst was refloated and resumed her voyage.
Carl and Robert	Sweden	The brig was wrecked on the Goodwin Sands, Kent, United Kingdom with the loss of three of her ten crew. She was on a voyage from Hull, Yorkshire, United Kingdom to Bahia, Brazil.
Dwina	Prussia	The ship ran aground off "Leewuppen". She was on a voyage from Leith, Lothian, United Kingdom to Liebau. Dwina was refloated on 12 October and taken into Liebau the next day for repairs.
Egton	United Kingdom	The schooner collided with the sloop Ann (United Kingdom) and sank in the English Channel off Hythe, Kent. Her crew survived. She was on a voyage from London to Poole, Dorset.
Florence	France	The ship was driven ashore at Ryde, Isle of Wight, United Kingdom. Her crew were rescued. She was on a voyage from Boulogne, Pas-de-Calais to Le Tréport, Seine-Inférieure.
Fura Suiner	Norway	The ship was wrecked off Ouessant, Finistère, France. She was on a voyage from St. Ubes, Portugal to Christiansand.
Hernine	Stettin	The ship was driven ashore near "Liselle", Denmark. She was on a voyage from Liverpool, Lancashire, United Kingdom to Stettin.
Matrimony	United Kingdom	The schooner was damaged beyond repair at Eastbourne, Sussex.
Siren	United Kingdom	The ship capsized at Jersey, Channel Islands and was severely damaged.
Venus	Stettin	The brig was wrecked on the Cross Sand, in the North Sea off the coast of Norfolk, United Kingdom. She was on a voyage from Stettin to Plymouth, Devon, United Kingdom.

== 11 October ==
List of shipwrecks: 11 October 1841
Ship	State	Description
Carl Robert	Sweden	The brig was wrecked on the Goodwin Sands, Kent, United Kingdom with the loss of three of her ten crew. Four survivors were rescued by Hope (United Kingdom) and three by a lugger from Walmer.

== 12 October ==
List of shipwrecks: 12 October 1841
Ship	State	Description
Dido	United Kingdom	The ship was wrecked on The Skerries, in the Irish Sea off the coast of Anglesey with the loss of two of the 22 people on board. She was on a voyage from Dahomey to Liverpool, Lancashire.
Dove	United Kingdom	The ship was driven ashore and wrecked at Freshwater West, Pembrokeshire. She was on a voyage from Saundersfoot, Pembrokeshire to Wicklow.
Harriett	United Kingdom	The ship foundered in the Irish Sea off the coast of Pembrokeshire.
Hawk	United Kingdom	The ship sprang a leak and was beached at Cowes, Isle of Wight. She was on a voyage from London to Liverpool.
Lady Colebrook	United Kingdom	The ship ran aground on Taylor's Ground, in Liverpool Bay. She was on a voyage from Liverpool to Savannah, Georgia, United States. Lady Colebrook as refloated and put back to Liverpool.
Resolution	United Kingdom	The ship ran aground on the Dale Ground, in the Baltic Sea off Saaremaa, Russia. She was refloated but consequently foundered. Her crew were rescued. Reslolution was on a voyage from Cádiz, Spain to Helsinki, Grand Duchy of Finland.
Tynwald	United Kingdom	The ship ran aground on Nickman's Ground, in the Baltic Sea. She was on a voyage from Saint Petersburg, Russia to Liverpool. Tynwald was refloated and taken into Reval for repairs.

== 13 October ==
List of shipwrecks: 13 October 1841
Ship	State	Description
Ann	United Kingdom	The ship ran aground on the Red Noses, in Liverpool Bay. Her crew were rescued. She was on a voyage from Dublin to Liverpool, Lancashire.
Gem	United Kingdom	The ship ran aground on Scroby Sands, Norfolk. She was on a voyage from Havre de Grâce, Seine-Inférieure, France to Sunderland, County Durham. Gem was refloated and taken into Great Yarmouth, Norfolk.
Happy Return	United Kingdom	The ship was drivenashore at Bay du Vin, New Brunswick, British North America.
Independent	United Kingdom	The ship ran aground on the Cross Sand, in the North Sea off the coast of Norfolk. She was on a voyage from Quebec City, Province of Canada, British North America to Hull, Yorkshire.
Kamchatka (Камчатка)	Imperial Russian Navy	The brig was driven ashore and subsequently wrecked between the mouths of the Bolshaya and the ru:Opala. Her crew were rescued. She was on a voyage from Okhotsk to Petropavlovsk.
Nordstern	Flag unknown	The ship ran aground on the Rust Ground, in the Baltic Sea and sank. Her crew were rescued. She was on a voyage from Nice, Alpes-Maritimes, France to Saint Petersburg, Russia.

== 14 October ==
List of shipwrecks: 14 October 1841
Ship	State	Description
Amalie	Sweden	The ship was wrecked at "Hombersbunr", Norway. She was on a voyage from Lisbon, Portugal to Stockholm.
Black-eyed Susan	United Kingdom	The ship departed from Newcastle upon Tyne, Northumberland for Dublin. No further trace, presumed foundered with the loss of all hands.
Christina	Netherlands	The ship ran aground off Gosport, Hampshire, United Kingdom. She was on a voyage from New York to Amsterdam, North Holland. Christina was refloated on 19 October and taken into Portsmouth, Hampshire.
Malton	United Kingdom	The ship was wrecked in Walker Bay. Her crew were rescued. She was on a voyage from Bombay and/or Calcutta, India to London.
Ocean	United Kingdom	The brig was wrecked on the Holland Wadern, off Helsingborg, Sweden. Her crew survived. She was on a voyage from London to Saint Petersburg, Russia.
Palmyra	France	The brig was in collision with the barque Jane Frances and foundered 12 nautical miles (22 km) east north east of Whitby, Yorkshire, United Kingdom with the loss of a crew member. Survivors were rescued by Jane Frances. Palmyra was on a voyage from London to Hull, Yorkshire, United Kingdom.
Rover	(United Kingdom of Great Britain and Ireland) New South Wales	The schooner was driven ashore and wrecked at Broulee. with the loss of twelve of the 23 people on board
Smith	United Kingdom	The ship was wrecked on the Gunfleet Sand, in the North Sea off the coast of Essex. Her six crew were rescued by the schooner Albion (United Kingdom).
Sparkler	Hamburg	The ship was driven ashore and wrecked near "Lornet", France. Her crew were rescued. She was on a voyage from "Cronfugos" to Hamburg.
St. Helena	United Kingdom	The ship was driven ashore at Manly, New South Wales. She was on a voyage from the Cape of Good Hope to Sydney, New South Wales.
Susanna and Jane	United Kingdom	The ship was wrecked on "Listerland". She was on a voyage from the Clyde to Stettin.
Telford	United Kingdom	The ship was wrecked on the Gunfleet Sand. Her crew were rescued.

== 15 October ==
List of shipwrecks: 15 October 1841
Ship	State	Description
Amphitrite	United Kingdom	The ship was driven ashore on the Spanish coast near the mouth of the Guadarranque. She was on a voyage from Odesa to London. Amphitrite was refloated the next day and resumed her voyage.
Black Dwarf	United Kingdom	The smack was driven ashore and wrecked at St. Bees Head, Cumberland with the loss of her captain. She was on a voyage from Lancaster, Lancashire to Carlisle, Cumberland.
Elizabeth	United Kingdom	The ship collided with a brig and foundered in The Swin, off the coast of Essex. Her crew were rescued by Gazelle (United Kingdom). She was on a voyage from Seaham, County Durham to London.
Elizabeth	United Kingdom	The ship was wrecked on the Longsand, in the North Sea off the coast of Essex. She was on a voyage from Hull, Yorkshire to Smyrna, Ottoman Empire.
Julia	United Kingdom	The ship was in collision with Gloria (Russia) in the Mediterranean Sea and foundered 30 nautical miles (56 km) off Cádiz, Spain. She was on a voyage from Trieste to Liverpool, Lancashire.
Louisa	United Kingdom	The ship ran aground off Portaferry, County Down. she was on a voyage from Glasgow, Renfrewshire to Sierra Leone and Trinidad. Louisa was later refloated and put back to Glasgow for repairs.
Ocean	United Kingdom	The ship was driven ashore and wrecked at "Holland's Waedav". Her crew were rescued. She was on a voyage from London to Saint Petersburg, Russia.

== 16 October ==
List of shipwrecks: 16 October 1841
Ship	State	Description
Elizabeth	United Kingdom	The ship was wrecked on the Kentish Knock. Her crew were rescued. She was on a voyage from Hull, Yorkshire to Smyrna, Ottoman Empire.
George	United Kingdom	The schooner capsized and sank 5 nautical miles (9.3 km) off Whitby, Yorkshire with the loss of both crew.
Theseus	(United Kingdom of Great Britain and Ireland) British North America	The ship was driven ashore and wrecked at Tacumshane, County Wexford, United Kingdom. Her crew were rescued. She was on a voyage from Saint John, New Brunswick to Cork.

== 17 October ==
List of shipwrecks: 17 October 1841
Ship	State	Description
Ark	United Kingdom	The ship ran aground on the Gunfleet Sand, in the North Sea off the coast of Essex. She was on a voyage from South Shields, County Durham to London. Ark was refloated and taken into Harwich, Essex.
Bartley	United Kingdom	The brig was driven ashore and severely damaged at Maryport, Cumberland. She was on a voyage from Belfast, County Antrim to Maryport. Bartley was refloated on 1 November and taken into Maryport.
Brancepeth Castle	United Kingdom	The ship was abandoned in the North Sea off the Dudgeon Lightship ( Trinity House). Her crew were rescued by Bognor (United Kingdom). Brancepeth Castle was taken into Great Yarmouth, Norfolk the next day.
Christina	Netherlands	The ship was driven ashore at Gosport, Hampshire, United Kingdom. she was on a voyage from New York, United States to Amsterdam, North Holland.
Ewart	United Kingdom	The ship was driven ashore at Ballyshannon, County Donegal. She was later refloated.
Gezina	Netherlands	The ship was driven ashore at Brouwershaven, Zeeland. She was on a voyage from Liverpool, Lancashire, United Kingdom to Dordrecht, South Holland.
Harmony	United Kingdom	The ship ran aground on the Maplin Sand, in the North Sea off the coast of Essex.
Odin	United Kingdom	The ship ran aground on the Middle Sand, in the North Sea off the coast of Essex. She was on a voyage from Newcastle upon Tyne, Northumberland to London. Odin was refloated and taken into Harwich.
Rosina	United Kingdom	The smack was driven ashore and wrecked at "Guidore", Ireland. Her crew were rescued.
Shamrock	(United Kingdom of Great Britain and Ireland) British North America	The ship was driven ashore at Ballyshannon.
Susan	United Kingdom	The ship ran aground on the Shipwash Sand, in the North Sea off the coast of Suffolk. She was on a voyage from Blyth, Northumberland to Boulogne, Pas-de-Calais, France. Susan was refloated and taken into Harwich in a leaky condition.
Thistle	United Kingdom	The ship foundered off Harwich. She was on a voyage from Sunderland, County Durham to London.
Union	United Kingdom	The ship was wrecked near Amlwch, Anglesey. Her crew were rescued. She was on a voyage from and Irish port to Liverpool, Lancashire.
William and Mary	United Kingdom	The ship was driven ashore at Shoreham-by-Sea, Sussex. Her crew were rescued. She was on a voyage from Caen, Calvados, France to Shoreham-by-Sea. William and Mary was refloated on 28 October and taken into Shoreham by Sea.
William and Tom	United Kingdom	The ship was wrecked at Ilfracombe, Devon. Her crew were rescued. She was on a voyage from Clonakilty, County Cork to Cardiff, Glamorgan.

== 18 October ==
List of shipwrecks: 18 October 1841
Ship	State	Description
Ann	United Kingdom	The ship sank at South Shields, County Durham.
Aurora	United Kingdom	The ship was wrecked on Juist, Kingdom of Hanover. Her crew were rescued. She was on a voyage from Sunderland, County Durham to Hamburg.
Bell	United Kingdom	The ship sprang a leak and foundered in the Irish Channel. Her crew were rescued. She was on a voyage from Liverpool, Lancashire to Donegal, County Donegal
Belle	United Kingdom	The brig was wrecked at Neath, Glamorgan. Her crew were rescued.
Edward	United Kingdom	The ship was driven ashore at Pembroke Dock, Pembrokeshire.
Florida	United States	The ship was wrecked in Richmond Bay, Prince Edward Island, British North America.
Happy Return	United Kingdom	The ship was driven ashore at Bay du Vin, New Brunswick, British North America.
Henry	United Kingdom	The brig foundered in the North Sea off the coast of Yorkshire. Her nine crew were rescued. She was on a voyage from London to Sunderland, County Durham.
Jane	United Kingdom	The ship was driven ashore and severely damaged at Innermessan, Wigtownshire.
Jean	United Kingdom	The ship was driven ashore at Ballyferris, County Down. She was on a voyage from Newry, County Antrim to Irvine, Ayrshire. Jean was later refloated and resumed her voyage.
John and Mary	United Kingdom	The ship was driven ashore at Bathurst, Gambia Colony and Protectorate.
John Taylor	United States	The ship was driven ashore and damaged at La Punta Del Olandes, between Cabo Corrientes and Cape San Antonio, Cuba. All 206 people on board were rescued. She was on a voyage from Liverpool to New Orleans, Louisiana. John Taylor was refloated on 4 December and proceeded on her voyage.
Lady Mary Stewart	United Kingdom	The ship was driven ashore at Workington, Cumberland.
Lavinia	United Kingdom	The ship was wrecked on the north coast of Prince Edward Island.
HMS Medina	Royal Navy	The Merlin-class packet boat was driven ashore at Kingstown, County Dublin.
Mountaineer	United Kingdom	The ship was wrecked at Caernarfon with the loss of a crew member. She was on a voyage from "Rio de la Hache" to Caernarfon.
Robert	Norway	The ship was driven ashore at Egersund. She was on a voyage from St. Ubes, Portugal to Egersund.
Roselle	United Kingdom	The brig was driven ashore at Andreselles, Pas-de-Calais, France. Her crew were rescued. She was on a voyage from Southampton, Hampshire to Newcastle upon Tyne, Northumberland.
Sir William Bensley	United Kingdom	The ship was wrecked at Sandy Cove, Nova Scotia, British North America. Her crew were rescued. She was on a voyage from London to Quebec City, Province of Canada, British North America.
Triumph	United Kingdom	The ship was wrecked on Cape Sable Island, Nova Scotia. Her crew were rescued. She was on a voyage from New York, United States to Saint John's, Newfoundland.

== 19 October ==
List of shipwrecks: 19 October 1841
Ship	State	Description
Britannia	United Kingdom	The ship was abandoned in the North Sea off the coast of Essex. She was on a voyage from South Shields, County Durham to London. Britannia was taken into Harwich, Essex.
Columbus	United Kingdom	The ship foundered off Domesnes, Norway. Her crew were rescued. She was on a voyage from Hartlepool, County Durham to Karlskrona, Sweden.
Globe	United Kingdom	The ship was abandoned in the Atlantic Ocean. Her crew were rescued by General Bolivar (United States). Globe was on a voyage from Londonderry to Castine, Maine, United States.
Hanen	Hamburg	The ship was driven ashore near the "Bosche". She was on a voyage from London to Hamburg.
Hoffnung	Prussia	The ship ran aground on the Oster Koff, in the Baltic Sea off the coast of Prussia. She was refloated but then ran aground on the Osterpackwerk. Hoffnung was subsequently taken into Swinemünde. She was on a voyage from Newcastle upon Tyne, Northumberland, United Kingdom to Swinemünde.
Lizette	United Kingdom	The ship sprang a leak and was beached at Koserow, Prussia, where she was wrecked. She was on a voyage from Peterhead, Aberdeenshire to Stettin.
Portentia	(United Kingdom of Great Britain and Ireland) New South Wales	The ship was driven ashore at Barrack Point, New South Wales. She was on a voyage from Port Auckland, New Zealand to Sydney.
William and Tom	United Kingdom	The ship was driven ashore and wrecked at Ilfracombe, Devon. Her crew were rescued. She was on a voyage from Clonakilty, County Cork to Cardiff, Glamorgan.
Zele	France	The ship struck rocks off the Glénan Islands, Finistère and foundered. Her crew were rescued.

== 20 October ==
List of shipwrecks: 20 October 1841
Ship	State	Description
Brothers	United Kingdom	The ship was driven ashore at Maryport, Cumberland. She was on a voyage from Maryport to Dublin.
Diligent	France	The ship was abandoned in the North Sea. Her crew were rescued by the steamship William (Hamburg). Diligent was on a voyage from Sunderland, County Durham, United Kingdom to Nantes, Loire-Inférieure.
Duke	United Kingdom	The ship departed from Whitby, Yorkshire. She subsequently foundered in the North Sea off the coast of County Durham, a boat from the vessel washed up near Hartlepool.
Josephine	United Kingdom	The smack was driven ashore at Rye, Sussex with the loss of two crew. A pilot and three Coast Guard officers who went to their rescued also died. She was on a voyage from London to Cherbourg, Seine-Inférieure, France.
Lowestoft	(United Kingdom of Great Britain and Ireland) New South Wales	The schooner was driven ashore at the mouth of the Yarra Yarra.
Neptune	Russia	The ship was driven ashore derelict on the coast of Connemara, Ireland. She was on a voyage from Pori, Finland to Marseille, Bouches-du-Rhône.
Sylph	United Kingdom	The ship was driven ashore at Rye. She was on a voyage from South Shields, County Durham to Rye.
Unity	United Kingdom	The ship was driven ashore at Rye. She was on a voyage from South Shields to Rye.

== 21 October ==
List of shipwrecks: 21 October 1841
Ship	State	Description
Albion	United Kingdom	The ship was driven ashore and severely damaged at Wells-next-the-Sea, Norfolk. She was refloated on 25 October and taken into Wells-next-the-Sea.
Ceres	United Kingdom	The ship was abandoned by her crew. She was subsequently driven ashore and wrecked at "Strabush". She was on a voyage from Dublin to Greifswald.
Cherub	United Kingdom	The ship ran aground at the north point of Prince Edward Island, British North America. She was on a voyage from Dundalk, County Louth to Miramichi, New Brunswick, British North America. Cherub was consequently condemned.
Jasper	United Kingdom	The ship ran aground on the Florida Reef. She was on a voyage from Jamaica to Halifax, Nova Scotia, British North America. Jasper was refloated and taken into Key West, Florida Territory.
Joseph	United Kingdom	The ship sank at Margate, Kent.
Margaret	United Kingdom	The ship was wrecked near "Falkenburg". She was on a voyage from Hull, Yorkshire to Saint Petersburg, Russia.
Rover	United Kingdom	The ship ran aground on the Gunfleet Sand, in the North Sea off the coast Essex and was damaged. She was later taken into Harwich in a leaky condition with assistance from the smack Atalanta (United Kingdom).
Sophia	United Kingdom	The ship was driven ashore and wrecked at Sandsend, Yorkshire.
Trust	United Kingdom	The ship was driven ashore at Berck, Pas-de-Calais, France. Her crew were rescued.
William Barras	United Kingdom	The ship capsized in the Hooghly River. Her crew were rescued. She was on a voyage from Calcutta, India to Mauritius.

== 22 October ==
List of shipwrecks: 22 October 1841
Ship	State	Description
Alida	Netherlands	The ship was wrecked on Rügen, Prussia. Her crew were rescued. She was on a voyage from Demmin, Prussia to Amsterdam, North Holland.
Atlas	United Kingdom	The brig was driven ashore on Skagen, Denmark. She was on a voyage from London to Pori, Grand Duchy of Finland.
Broadwood	United Kingdom	The collier, a brig, was sunk at Rotherhithe, Kent by a barge which sank alongside her and then refloated under her on a rising tide. Her crew survived.
Cledan, and Wanderer	United Kingdom	The ships collided off the Isle of Wight and both ran aground on The Shingles. Cledan was on a voyage from Ipswich, Suffolk to Dublin. She was later refloated and taken into Yarmouth, Isle of Wight. Wanderer was refloated the next day.
Diana	United Kingdom	The ship was driven ashore on Texel, North Holland, Netherlands. She was on a voyage from Grangemouth, Stirlingshire to Dordrecht, South Holland, Netherlands.
Elizabeth Miller	United Kingdom	The schooner capsized in the North Sea 5 nautical miles (9.3 km) off Whitby, Yorkshire with the loss of all hands. She was on a voyage from Hull, Yorkshire to Glasgow, Renfrewshire.
Flora	United Kingdom	The smack was wrecked at Red Bay, County Antrim. Her crew were rescued. She was on a voyage from Dundalk, County Louth to Belfast, County Antrim.
Freedom	United Kingdom	The ship was driven ashore and damaged at Newhaven, Sussex. She was on a voyage from Sunderland, County Durham to Newhaven. Freedom was refloated on 24 October and taken into Newhaven, where she sank.
La Bonne Mère	France	The brig was wrecked in the Vlie with the loss of two of her five crew. She was on a voyage from Sunderland, County Durham, United Kingdom to a French port.
Liberal	United Kingdom	The ship was driven ashore near Callantsoog, North Holland. She was on a voyage from Sunderland to Rotterdam, South Holland.
Occasio	Norway	The brig was driven ashore and wrecked at Husby south of Thisted. Her crew were rescued. She was on a voyage from Christiansand, Norway to Saint-Malo, Ille-et-Vilaine.
Oost Friesia	Netherlands	The ship was driven ashore on Texel. She was on a voyage from Grangemouth to Antwerp, Belgium.
Thetis	Danzig	The brig was driven ashore and wrecked at Helsingør, Denmark with the loss of six of her seven crew. She was on a voyage from Newcastle upon Tyne, Northumberland, United Kingdom to Danzig.
Thomason	United Kingdom	The ship was wrecked near Varburg, Sweden. Her crew were rescued. She was on a voyage from Saint Petersburg, Russia to London.
Topaz	United Kingdom	The ship was wrecked in White Bear Bay with the loss of a passenger. She was on a voyage from Jamaica to Sydney, Nova Scotia, British North America.

== 23 October ==
List of shipwrecks: 23 October 1841
Ship	State	Description
Ardent	United Kingdom	The ship ran aground on the Nore. She was on a voyage from the Isles of Scilly to London. Ardent was refloated on 25 October and resumed her voyage.
Barbarina	Portugal	The ship was driven ashore west of Kronstadt, Russia. She was on a voyage from Lisbon to Saint Petersburg, Russia.
Bullfinch	United Kingdom	The ship was driven ashore at Saint Petersburg. She was on a voyage from London to Saint Petersburg. Bullfinch was refloated on 26 October and taken into port.
Emblem	United Kingdom	The ship was wrecked on the Middle Sand, in the North Sea off the coast of Essex with the loss of all hands.
Fox	United Kingdom	The ship was wrecked on the Herd Sand, in the North Sea off the coast of County Durham. Her crew were rescued. She was on a voyage from Gravesend, Kent to South Shields, County Durham.
Heinrich Johan	Flag unknown	The ship foundered in the North Sea off the Duchy of Holstein with the loss of all hands.
John and William	United Kingdom	The ship was driven ashore and severely damaged at Newhaven, Sussex. She was on a voyage from Great Yarmouth, Norfolk to Shoreham-by-Sea, Sussex. John and William was refloated on 26 October and taken into Newhaven for repairs.
Junge	Stolp	The ship was wrecked at "Svanike", Denmark. She was on a voyage from Stolp to Amsterdam, North Holland, Netherlands.
Mercurius	Norway	The ship was driven ashore at Amsterdam.
Sarah	United Kingdom	The ship ran aground off the mouth of the River Avon.
Thetis	United Kingdom	The ship was driven ashore and wrecked at Dungeness, Kent. She was on a voyage from Hartlepool, County Durham to Weymouth, Dorset.

== 24 October ==
List of shipwrecks: 24 October 1841
Ship	State	Description
Barbarina	Portugal	The ship ran aground off Kronstadt, Russia. She was on a voyage from Lisbon to Saint Petersburg, Russia.
Brothers	United Kingdom	The ship was wrecked on Cape Breton Island, Nova Scotia, British North America.
Bullfinch	United Kingdom	The ship was driven ashore at Kronstadt. She was on a voyage from London to Saint Petersburg. Bullfinch was refloated on 26 October and taken into Saint Petersburg.
Caroline	Flag unknown	The ship was abandoned in the North Sea. She was on a voyage from Gothenburg, Sweden to Bremen. Caroline was subsequently taken into Blankenese, Hamburg.
Eliza	United Kingdom	The ship collided John and Betsey (United Kingdom) and foundered off "Cwmdewy", Wales.
Favourite	United Kingdom	The ship was driven ashore and wrecked 1 nautical mile (1.9 km) east of Findhorn, Morayshire. Her three crew were rescued. She was on a voyage from Sunderland, County Durham to Campbeltown, Argyllshire.
John Cabot	United Kingdom	The ship was in collision with Alecto and was consequently beached in the Swash. She was on a voyage from Bristol, Gloucestershire to Africa.
Prosperous	United Kingdom	The brig was driven ashore at Newhaven, Sussex. She was on a voyage from South Shields, County Durham to Christchurch, Hampshire. Prosperous was refloated on 26 October and taken into Newhaven.

== 25 October ==
List of shipwrecks: 25 October 1841
Ship	State	Description
Amnista	Spain	The ship was driven ashore at Gibraltar. She was on a voyage from Barcelona to Montevideo, Uruguay. Amnista was refloated.
Bertha	United Kingdom	The ship was driven ashore near Danzig. Her crew were rescued. She was on a voyage from London to Danzig.
Lightfoot	United Kingdom	The ship was driven ashore at Donaghadee, County Down. She was on a voyage from Portaferry to Ayr.Lightfoot was refloated.
Riseborough	United Kingdom	The brig was driven ashore at Saint Andrews, Fife.
Sarah	United Kingdom	The ship ran aground at Bristol, Gloucestershire. She was on a voyage from Bristol to Newport, Monmouthshire. Sarah was refloated on 24 November and proceeded on her voyage.
Smith	United Kingdom	The brig was wrecked on the Gunfleet Sand, in the North Sea off the coast of Essex. Her six crew were rescued by the schooner Albion (United Kingdom).
William Wallace	United Kingdom	The ship ran aground on the Herd Sand, in the North Sea off the coast of County Durham. Her crew were rescued by the South Shields Lifeboat. She was on a voyage from South Shields, County Durham to Miramichi, New Brunswick, British North America. She was later refloated and taken into North Shields where she was repaired and lengthened.

== 26 October ==
List of shipwrecks: 26 December 1841
Ship	State	Description
Ann	United Kingdom	The ship was driven ashore in Broadhaven Bay with the loss of a crew member. She was on a voyage from Limerick to Glasgow, Renfrewshire.
Courier	United Kingdom	The ship was driven ashore and wrecked on Governors Island, Prince Edward Island, British North America. She was on a voyage from "Antigouch" to Port Wallace, Nova Scotia, British North America.
Move	United Kingdom	The ship departed from Emden, Kingdom of Hanover for Liverpool, Lancashire. No further trace, presumed foundered with the loss of all hands.

== 27 October ==
List of shipwrecks: 27 October 1841
Ship	State	Description
Adolphine	Stettin	The ship was driven ashore and wrecked at Stralsund. She was on a voyage from Copenhagen, Denmark to Stettin.
Betsey	United Kingdom	The ship ran aground on the Nore. She was on a voyage from London to Londonderry. Betsey was refloated and taken into Sheerness, Kent.
Ceres	Norway	The ship sprang a leak and was subsequently wrecked on a reef off Skagen, Denmark. Her crew were rescued.
Clinton	United States	The brig was driven ashore in the Savannah River.
Clonmel	United Kingdom	The ship was driven ashore at Newtown, Isle of Wight. she was on a voyage from Waterford to Southampton, Hampshire. She was refloated on 29 October and resumed her voyage.
Concord	United Kingdom	The ship was wrecked on the north coast of Newfoundland, British North America. Five of her crew were rescued by Elizabeth and Mary (United Kingdom). Concord was on a voyage from Quebec City, Province of Canada, British North America to Plymouth, Devon.
Courier	United Kingdom	The ship was driven ashore on Governors Island, Prince Edward Island, British North America. She was on a voyage from "Antigouche" to Port Wallace, Nova Scotia, British North America.
Damascus	United States	The ship was driven ashore in the Savannah River.
Earl of Erroll	United Kingdom	The ship foundered in the Atlantic Ocean off the Slyne Head Lighthouse, County Galway.
Endeavour	United Kingdom	The smack was wrecked at Cley-next-the-Sea, Norfolk with the loss of both crew. She was on a voyage from Hull, Yorkshire to Cley-next-the-Sea.
Flora	Rostock	The ship was wrecked at "Falkenburg", Sweden. Her crew were rescued. She was on a voyage from London to Rostock.
Frederick	Prussia	The ship was wrecked on the Herd Sand, in the North Sea off the coast of County Durham, United Kingdom. Her crew were rescued by the North Shields Lifeboat. Frederick was on a voyage from Brest, Finistère, France to North Shields.
Granville	France	The ship was driven ashore at Havre de Grâce, Seine-Inférieure. She was on a voyage from Havre de Grâce to Pointe-à-Pitre, Guadeloupe.
Hecla	France	The ship sank off Dunkirk, Nord. Her crew were rescued. She was on a voyage from Saint Petersburg, Russia to Dunkirk.
John and Mary	United Kingdom	The schooner collided with the brig Mathilde (France) and foundered in the English Channel 7 nautical miles (13 km) south of Penzance, Cornwall. Her crew were rescued. She was on a voyage from Bangor to Goole, Yorkshire.
L'Adolphe	France	The chasse-marée was abandoned in the North Sea 1 nautical mile (1.9 km) off Bridlington, Yorkshire. Her crew were rescued. She was on a voyage from Dunkirk, Nord to Sunderland, County Durham, United Kingdom. L'Adolphe was subsequently driven ashore and wrecked at Barmston, Yorkshire.
Margaret	United Kingdom	The ship was wrecked at "Falkenburg". She was on a voyage from Leith, Lothian to Saint Petersburg, Russia.
Neptunus	Denmark	The schooner was wrecked on "Gragholmen". Her crew were rescued. she was on a voyage from Aarhus to Hull, Yorkshire, United Kingdom.
Olga	Stettin	The ship was driven ashore on Wittow, Prussia, where she was subsequently wrecked. She was on a voyage from Newcastle upon Tyne, Northumberland, United Kingdom to Stettin.
Rival	United Kingdom	The ship was driven ashore at Seacombe, Cheshire. She was on a voyage from Liverpool, Lancashire to Constantinople, Ottoman Empire. Rival was refloated on 28 October and resumed her voyage.
Rover	United Kingdom	The ship was driven ashore and wrecked at Wainfleet, Lincolnshire.
Samarang	United Kingdom	The ship was driven ashore in the Savannah River.
Shamrock	United Kingdom	The ship struck the Welloe Shoal and was damaged. She was on a voyage from Plymouth, Devon to Gloucester. She was refloated and put into Penzance, Cornwall.
Swalan	Sweden	The ship was driven ashore and damaged near Dalarö. She was on a voyage from Tenerife, Canary Islands to Stockholm. Swalan was later refloated and towed into Stockholm.
Union	United Kingdom	The ship was driven ashore at Whitby, Yorkshire.
Union	United Kingdom	The ship was driven ashore and wrecked at Deal, Kent.
Verdant	United Kingdom	The ship ran aground on the Nore. She was refloated and taken into Sheerness.

== 28 October ==
List of shipwrecks: 28 October 1841
Ship	State	Description
Achilles	United Kingdom	The ship was wrecked on the Niding Reef. Her crew were rescued. She was on a voyage from London to Danzig.
Adolphus	United Kingdom	The ship was driven ashore and wrecked 6 nautical miles (11 km) south of Bridlington, Yorkshire. Her crew were rescued. She was on a voyage from Dunkirk, Nord to Sunderland, County Durham.
Angel	United Kingdom	The ship was driven ashore at Saltfleet, Lincolnshire. Her crew were rescued. She was on a voyage from London to Bremen.
Apenrade Packet	Denmark	The schooner ran aground on the Long Sand, in the North Sea off the coast of Essex, United Kingdom. Her crew were rescued. She was on a voyage from Altona to Liverpool, Lancashire, United Kingdom. Apenrade Packet was refloated the next day and taken into Margate, Kent, United Kingdom.
Carl	Stettin	The ship was wrecked on the Niding Reef. Her crew were rescued. She was on a voyage from Leith, Lothian to Saint Petersburg, Russia, or Stettin.
Diadem	United Kingdom	The ship was driven ashore at Saltfleet. She was on a voyage from Great Yarmouth, Norfolk to Goole, Yorkshire.
Ebba Maria	Hamburg	The ship was driven ashore and wrecked near Prerow, Prussia. She was on a voyage from Kalmar, Sweden to Copenhagen, Denmark.
Gibson	Denmark	The schooner was in collision the schooner Mark Breeds (United Kingdom) and foundered off The Lizard, Cornwall, United Kingdom with the loss of all but her captain. She was on a voyage from Cardiff, Glamorgan, United Kingdom to Altona
Maria Théresa	France	The ship was wrecked on Skagen, Denmark with the loss of her captain. She was on a voyage from Stettin to a French port.
Niger	United Kingdom	The ship was wrecked at the mouth of the Mesurado River, Africa with the loss of five of her crew. She was on a voyage from Bristol, Gloucestershire to Africa.
North Shields	United Kingdom	The ship was driven ashore and wrecked at Wainfleet, Lincolnshire.
Tre Sostre	Denmark	The ship was driven ashore and wrecked on Samsø. Her crew were rescued. She was on a voyage from Aalborg to Samsø.
Union	United Kingdom	The ship was wrecked on the Sunk Sand, in the North Sea off the coast of Essex. She was on a voyage from London to Saint Petersburg, Russia.

== 29 October ==
List of shipwrecks: 29 October 1841
Ship	State	Description
Condo	United Kingdom	The ship was driven ashore at Naples, Kingdom of the Two Sicilies. She was on a voyage from London to Naples. she was consequently condemned.
Eliza Williams	United Kingdom	The ship struck the Runnel Stone and sank. Her crew were rescued. She was on a voyage from Cork to London.
Fluminiss	Brazil	The brig was wrecked in the Crozet Islands with the loss of fifteen of her twenty crew.
Morning Star	United Kingdom	The schooner was wrecked at Apple River, Nova Scotia, British North America. She was on a voyage from Windsor, Nova Scotia to Eastport, Maine, United States.
Petronella	Netherlands	The ship was wrecked on Terschelling, Friesland with the loss of four of her crew. She was on a voyage from Saint Petersburg, Russia to Amsterdam, North Holland.
Vier Antina	Danzig	The ship ran aground on the Swinebottoms. She was on a voyage from Danzig to Guernsey, Channel Islands. Vier Antinawas refloated on 6 November and put into Helsingør, Denmark for repairs.

== 30 October ==
List of shipwrecks: 30 October 1841
Ship	State	Description
Frithiof	Norway	The ship foundered in the English Channel 30 nautical miles (56 km) off the Isle of Wight, United Kingdom. Her six crew survived. She was on a voyage from Riga, Russia to St. Ubes, Portugal.
Glide	United Kingdom	The ship ran aground off Falsterbo, Sweden. She was refloated but consequently sank. Her crew were rescued by Temiscousta (flag unknown). She was on a voyage from Danzig to London.
Sigismunde	Danzig	The schooner was driven ashore at "Haltug". She was on Newcastle upon Tyne, Northumberland, United Kingdom to Danzig.
Surprise	(United Kingdom of Great Britain and Ireland) New Zealand	The schooner was wrecked at "Wangauire". All on board were rescued.
Vestal	United Kingdom	The ship was driven ashore and wrecked at Dundee, Forfarshire. Her crew were rescued by the Coast Guard. She was on a voyage from Porto, Portugal to Dundee.
Vriendschap	Netherlands	The ship was driven ashore on Vlieland, Friesland with the loss of three of her crew. She was on a voyage from Saint Petersburg, Russia to Amsterdam, North Holland.
Wanskapen	(Russian Empire) Grand Duchy of Finland	The ship was driven ashore at "Kunkel".

== Unknown date ==
List of shipwrecks: Unknown date in October 1841
Ship	State	Description
Belvedere	United Kingdom	The barque ran aground on the Goodwin Sands, Kent. She was on a voyage from Quebec City, Province of Canada, British North America to Newcastle upon Tyne, Northumberland.
Cato	United States	The brig was abandoned off the coast of Massachusetts before 4 October.
Cock	Netherlands	The ship was wrecked before 30 October whilst on a voyage from Manila, Spanish East Indies to Batavia, Netherlands East Indies. Her crew were rescued.
Concordia	Denmark	The ship was driven ashore on the coast of Jutland before 8 October. Her crew survived.
Courier	United Kingdom	The ship was driven ashore on Governors Island, Prince Edward Island, British North America. She was on a voyage from Antigonish, Nova Scotia to Wallace, Nova Scotia.
E. B. Horard	United Kingdom	The ship was driven ashore in Egmont Bay, New Brunswick, British North America. She was on a voyage from Charlottetown to Miramichi.
Eleanor	United Kingdom	The ship was driven ashore 20 nautical miles (37 km) north of Bird Islands. She was on a voyage from London to Bathurst, Gambia. She was refloated and continued her voyage, arriving at Bathurst on 15 October.
Elizabeth	United Kingdom	The ship was driven ashore at Shippigan, New Brunswick before 30 October. She was consequently condemned. Elizabeth was on a voyage from Liverpool, Lancashire to Dalhousie, New Brunswick.
Emma	United Kingdom	The ship was wrecked on the Middle Sand, in the North Sea off the coast of Essex in mid-October with the loss of all hands.
Freundschaft	Denmark	The ship sank in the North Leer before 8 October. Her crew survived.
Ganges	United Kingdom	The ship was driven ashore 20 nautical miles (37 km) north of Bird Island. She was on a voyage from London to Bathurst. Ganges was refloated and completed her voyage. She arrived at Bathurst on 15 October.
Gazelle	United Kingdom	The ship ran aground in the Garavogue River. She was refloated on 29 October.
Glenlyon	United Kingdom	The ship was wrecked on the Quaco Ledges. She was on a voyage from Saint John, New Brunswick to Liverpool, Lancashire.
Good Hope	United Kingdom	The ship was driven ashore and wrecked at South Shields, County Durham on or before 6 October.
Hercules	United Kingdom	The ship was driven ashore at Aldeburgh, Suffolk. She was on a voyage from Newcastle upon Tyne to Aldeburgh. Hercules was refloated on 6 October and taken into Aldeburgh.
Indus	United Kingdom	The ship ran aground on the Gunfleet Sand, in the North Sea off the coast of Essex and was abandoned by her crew. She was on a voyage from Sunderland to London. Indus was refloated on 24 October and taken into Harwich, Essex.
Industry	United Kingdom	The ship foundered in the North Sea off the coast of Denmark.
London or Londonderry	(United Kingdom of Great Britain and Ireland) British North America	The ship was driven ashore near "Mistreck" before 4 October. She was later refloated and take into that port.
Montreal	United Kingdom	The ship was wrecked in the Torres Straits before 4 September. Her crew were rescued. She was on a voyage from Sydney, New South Wales to Guam and Manila, Spanish East Indies.
Robert Bowery	United Kingdom	The ship was driven ashore near Christiania, Norway. She was on a voyage from London to Saint Petersburg. Robert Bowery floated off on 15 October and was again driven ashore and was wrecked.
Rowena	United Kingdom	The ship was driven ashore at Grand Étang, Nova Scotia before 14 October and was abandoned by her crew.
Speculation	(United Kingdom of Great Britain and Ireland) Guernsey	The ship was abandoned whilst on a voyage from "Schien" to Guernsey. Her crew were rescued.
Star	(United Kingdom of Great Britain and Ireland) New South Wales	The schooner was wrecked in Brisbane Water with the loss of all but her captain.
Thetis	Denmark	The ship was wrecked at Narva, Russia.
Timoleon	United States	The ship was driven ashore on Gotland, Sweden. She was on a voyage from Stockholm, Sweden to Boston, Massachusetts. Timoleon was later refloated and put into Copenhagen, Denmark.
Ulrica Charlotte	Sweden	The ship was wrecked off Falsterbo with the loss of all hands. She was on a voyage from Newcastle upon Tyne to Ystad.
Union	United Kingdom	The ship was wrecked on the Long Sand, in the North Sea off the coast of Essex before 31 October.
William	Netherlands	The ship was driven ashore on Heligoland before 21 October, where she subsequently became a wreck. She was on a voyage from Liebau, Prussia to Schiedam, South Holland.
