= List of shipwrecks in October 1857 =

The list of shipwrecks in October 1857 includes ships sunk, foundered, wrecked, grounded, or otherwise lost during October 1857.

== 1 October ==
List of shipwrecks: 1 October 1857
Ship	State	Description
Adamastor	Flag unknown	The ship was driven ashore at Hong Kong in a typhoon.
Arabian	United Kingdom	The full-rigged ship was run into by the full-rigged ship Contest (United States) and severely damaged in a typhoon at Hong Kong.
Cecchina	Grand Duchy of Tuscany	The ship was wrecked at Ersa, Corsica, France. She was on a voyage from Mariana, Corsica to Alghero, Sardinia.
Cumfa	Flag unknown	The steamship was driven ashore at Hong Kong in a typhoon.
Ellen Radford	United Kingdom	The ship ran aground on the Blackwater Bank, in the Irish Sea off the coast of Lancashire. She was on a voyage from Liverpool, Lancashire to Valparaíso, Chile. She was refloated and put back to Liverpool in a leaky condition.
Fame	United Kingdom	The brig collided with Lamplighter (United Kingdom) and foundered in the North Sea off Flamborough Head, Yorkshire. Her crew were rescued. She was on a voyage from Great Yarmouth, Norfolk to Seaham, County Durham.
Johanna	Flag unknown	The ship was driven ashore in a typhoon at Hong Kong.
Lintin	Flag unknown	The ship was driven ashore in a typhoon at Hong Kong.
Sylphide	France	The brig was wrecked at Luri, Corsica. Her crew were rescued.
Willamette	United Kingdom	The steamship was driven ashore in a typhoon at Hong Kong.

== 2 October ==
List of shipwrecks: 2 October 1857
Ship	State	Description
Elbe	United Kingdom	The ship was driven ashore and wrecked at Dragør, Denmark. She was on a voyage from Copenhagen, Denmark to Memel, Prussia. She was refloated on 8 October and taken in to Copenhagen.
Ellen Radford	United Kingdom	The ship ran aground on the Arklow bank, in the Irish Sea off the coast of County Wexford. She was on a voyage from Liverpool, Lancashire to Valparaíso, Chile. She was refloated and put back to Liverpool in a leaky condition.
Hope	United Kingdom	The sloop was driven ashore 2 nautical miles (3.7 km) east of Dunbar, Lothian. She was on a voyage from Newcastle upon Tyne, Northumberland to Pettycur, Fife.
Mary Gray	United Kingdom	The barque sprang a leak off "Kofod Isle", Norway and was abandoned by her crew. She was on a voyage from Dundee, Forfarshire to Arkhangelsk, Russia.
Medoka	Kingdom of Sardinia	The schooner was wrecked off "Hemsbye", Denmark with the loss of all hands.
Tinamara	United Kingdom	The barque ran aground on the Haisborough Sands, in the North Sea off the coast of Norfolk. She was on a voyage from South Shields, County Durham to Barcelona, Spain. She was refloated on 5 October and taken in to Great Yarmouth, Norfolk in a leaky condition.
William Wallace	United Kingdom	The schooner was wrecked at Island Point, British North America with the loss of all hands. She was on a voyage from Whitby, Yorkshire to Quebec City, Province of Canada, British North America.

== 3 October ==
List of shipwrecks: 3 October 1857
Ship	State	Description
Earl of Durham	United Kingdom	The ship was driven ashore at Smyrna, Ottoman Empire. She was refloated.
Louisa	United Kingdom	The barque was driven ashore and wrecked on Tenerife, Canary Islands.
Matchless	United States	The clipper was sighted off Anjer, Netherlands East Indies. She was on a voyage from New York to Manila, Spanish East Indies. No further trace.
Oceanica	United Kingdom	The ship ran aground at Liverpool, Lancashire. She was on a voyage from Callao, Peru to Liverpool. She was refloated the next day and taken in to Liverpool.
Volante	United Kingdom	The brig was wrecked in Bertheaux Bay, Finistère, France. Her crew were rescued. She was on a voyage from Brest, Finistère to Cardiff, Glamorgan.

== 4 October ==
List of shipwrecks: 4 October 1857
Ship	State	Description
Ben Coursin	United States	The steamship was in collision with the steamship Kay City (United States) and sank in the Mississippi River at its junction with the La Crosse River with the loss of fifteen lives.
Ellen Gisbourne	(United Kingdom of Great Britain and Ireland) British North America	The steamship was destroyed by fire at Harbour Grace, Newfoundland.
Hercules	United Kingdom	The ship was wrecked on Bornholm, Denmark.
Prince George	United Kingdom	The ship was abandoned in the Atlantic Ocean with the loss of three of her fifteen crew. Survivors were rescued by Bethia Jewett ( (United Kingdom of Great Britain and Ireland) British North America) and Skelton (United Kingdom). Prince George was on a voyage from Mobile, Alabama, United States to Falmouth, Cornwall.
Splendid	United Kingdom	The schooner was driven ashore and wrecked at Fleetwood, Lancashire. She was on a voyage from Ardrossan, Ayrshire to Fleetwood.

== 5 October ==
List of shipwrecks: 5 October 1857
Ship	State	Description
Alert	United Kingdom	The ship departed from Gijón, Spain for Liverpool, Lancashire. No further trace, presumed foundered with the loss of all hands.
Britannia	United Kingdom	The schooner was sighted off Boscastle, Cornwall whilst on a voyage from Neath, Glamorgan to Hayle, Cornwall. No further trace, presumed foundered with the loss of all five crew.
Fidget	United Kingdom	The schooner departed from Labrador, British North America for Glasgow, Renfrewshire. No further trace, presumed foundered with the loss of all hands.
Grace and Janes	United Kingdom	The ship was driven ashore at Narva, Russia. She had been refloated by 8 October and taken in to Nara.
Heloise	France	The ship sank in the Seine at Marais-Vernier, Eure. Her crew were rescued. She was on a voyage from Rouen, Seine-Inférieure to Bordeaux, Gironde.
Mary Ann	United Kingdom	The schooner was in collision with HMS Renown (Royal Navy) off Garrison Point, Kent and was severely damaged. She was on a voyage from Rochester, Kent to Sunderland, County Durham. She was beached at Sheerness, Kent.
Pasha	Flag unknown	The ship ran aground. She was refloated and put back to Saint Petersburg, Russia in a severely leaky condition.
Scottish Maid	United Kingdom	The schooner ran aground in the Seine at Marais-Vernier. She was on a voyage from Rouen to Blyth, Northumberland. She was refloated the next day and towed in to Havre de Grâce, Seine-Inférieure.
Strive	United Kingdom	The ship sprang a leak and was beached at Lisbon, Portugal. She was on a voyage from Licata Sicily to Falmouth, Cornwall.
513	Russia	The barge sank at Saint Petersburg.

== 6 October ==
List of shipwrecks: 6 October 1857
Ship	State	Description
Christoforo Colombo	Kingdom of the Two Sicilies	The ship ran aground on the Brake Sand, in the Thames Estuary. She was on a voyage from Naples to Newcastle upon Tyne, Northumberland, United Kingdom. She was refloated and assisted in to Ramsgate, Kent, United Kingdom.
Hugh Lupus	United Kingdom	The ship sank off "Helpsfoot", Lancashire.
Times	United Kingdom	The sloop struck Doig's Rock, in the Firth of Forth. She was on a voyage from Newcastle upon Tyne to Alloa, Clackmannanshire and Stirling. She put in to St. David's, Fife, where she sank. She was raised and temporarily repaired.

== 7 October ==
List of shipwrecks: 7 October 1857
Ship	State	Description
Abeona	United Kingdom	The ship was driven ashore at Millbay, Devon.
Draper	United Kingdom	The sloop was driven ashore and wrecked at Hastings, Sussex with the loss of all five crew. She was on a voyage from Newcastle upon Tyne, Northumberland to Falmouth, Cornwall.
Emu	(United Kingdom of Great Britain and Ireland) Jersey	The ship was driven ashore at Lyme Regis, Dorset. Her crew were rescued by the Lyme Regis Lifeboat.
Fame	United Kingdom	The ship was driven ashore at Lyme Regis. Her crew were rescued by the Lyme Regis Lifeboat.
Glory	United Kingdom	The ship sank at Lyme Regis. Her crew were rescued by the Lyme Regis Lifeboat.
Hebe	United Kingdom	The ship foundered in the North Sea 8 nautical miles (15 km) north of St. Abb's Head, Berwickshire. Her four crew were rescued by a fishing boat. She was on a voyage from Dundee, Forfarshire to Dieppe, Seine-Inférieure, France.
James and Charlotte	United Kingdom	The smack was driven ashore and wrecked at Lyme Regis. Her crew were rescued by the Lyme Regis Lifeboat.
Little Jem	(United Kingdom of Great Britain and Ireland) Guernsey	The ship was driven ashore at Lyme Regis. Her crew were rescued by the Lyme Regis Lifeboat.
Margaret	United Kingdom	The ship ran aground at Maassluis, South Holland, Netherlands. She was on a voyage from Maassluis to Hartlepool, County Durham. She was later refloated and resumed her voyage, arriving at Hartlepool on 15 October.
Mary	United Kingdom	The ship sank at Cardiff, Glamorgan.
Pilgrim	United Kingdom	The brig was driven ashore and wrecked at Brighton. Sussex. Her seven crew were rescued by the two Brighton Lifeboats. She was on a voyage from Middlesbrough, Yorkshire to Worthing, Sussex and/or Portsmouth, Hampshire.
Riga	United Kingdom	The brig was driven ashore at Helsingborg, Sweden. She had been refloated by 26 October and taken in to Helsingør, Denmark.
Robert	United Kingdom	The sloop was abandoned off the coast of Yorkshire. She was subsequently driven ashore and wrecked at Marske, Yorkshire.
Sir John Beresford	United Kingdom	The ship foundered in the Atlantic Ocean 50 nautical miles (93 km) south west of Cork. Nine of her twelve crew were rescued by Euphrates (United Kingdom), the remainder refused to leave the wreck. Sir John Beresford was on a voyage from Liverpool, Lancashire to Bombay, India.
Trident	United Kingdom	The ship was driven ashore at Penarth, Glamorgan.
Unity	United Kingdom	The barge sank at Plymouth, Devon.

== 8 October ==
List of shipwrecks: 8 October 1857
Ship	State	Description
Betsey	United Kingdom	The ship was driven ashore at King's Lynn, Norfolk. She was refloated on 20 October and taken in to King's Lynn for repairs.
Celerity	United Kingdom	The ship was holed by her anchore sank at Ramsgate, Kent. She was on a voyage from South Shields, County Durham to Exeter, Devon.
Constantinople	United Kingdom	The ship capsized and sank on the Muckra Putty Lumps with the loss of one life. She was on a voyage from the Mutlah River, India to Liverpool, Lancashire.
Elizabeth	United Kingdom	The ship was wrecked off Cape Borta, Kingdom of Sardinia. Her crew were rescued. She was on a voyage from Elba, Grand Duchy of Tuscany to Nergård, Norway.
Ellen Maria	United States	The schooner was in collision with the steamship Niagara (United States) and sank off Boston, Massachusetts.
Emperor	United Kingdom	The steamship ran aground near Fécamp, Pas-de-Calais with the loss of eight of her crew. She was on a voyage from Newcastle upon Tyne, Northumberland to Rouen, Seine-Inférieure, France. She was declared a total loss.
Erin	United Kingdom	The ship was driven ashore at Littlestone-on-Sea, Kent. She was on a voyage from Sunderland, County Durham to Torquay, Devon. She was refloated on 18 October and towed in to Dover, Kent.
Exchange	United Kingdom	The ship sank off Rügen, Prussia with the loss of four of her crew. She was on a voyage from South Shields to Kiel, Prussia.
Fiona	United Kingdom	The ship was abandoned in the North Sea. Her crew were rescued. She was on a voyage from Rostock to Liverpool.
Henry Porcher	United Kingdom	The ship was driven ashore in the Saint Lawrence River 5 nautical miles (9.3 km) downstream of Quebec City, Province of Canada, British North America. She was on a voyage from Grangemouth, Stirlingshire to Quebec City. She had been refloated by 7 November and taken in to Indian Cove, Newfoundland, British North America.
Hiawatha	United States	The ship ran aground off Great Yarmouth, Norfolk, United Kingdom. She was on a voyage from South Shields to New York. She was refloated and resumed her voyage, but subsequently put in to Ramsgate.
Janet	United Kingdom	The ship was wrecked on the Thistle Rocks, off the coast of Sweden. Her crew were rescued. She was on a voyage from Newcastle upon Tyne to Copenhagen, Denmark.
Jeune Gabrielle	France	The ship was wrecked on the west coast of the Île d'Oléron, Finistère. She was on a voyage from Blyth, Northumberland to Bayonne, Basses-Pyrénées.
Josephine	France	The lugger struck the pier and was wrecked at Ramsgate. Her crew were rescued. She was on a voyage from Sunderland to Nantes, Loire-Inférieure.
J. P. Morse	United States	The ship ran aground on the James and Mary Sand, in the Hooghly River. She was on a voyage from Liverpool to Calcutta. She was refloated and taken into Calcutta, where she sank the next day. She was a total loss.
Lady Gower	United Kingdom	The sloop was driven ashore at Great Yarmouth. She was on a voyage from Dundee, Forfarshire to Great Yarmouth.
Lemeraria	United Kingdom	The ship was wrecked at Cowes, Isle of Wight with the loss of three of her crew.
Lexington	United States	The ship ran aground and capsized in St. Finnan's Bay, County Kerry, United Kingdom with the loss of three of her crew. She was on a voyage from New Orleans, Louisiana to Tralee and Valentia Island, County Kerry and Liverpool, Lancashire, United Kingdom.
Logos	United Kingdom	The ship ran aground on the Cross Sand. She was on a voyage from Newcastle upon Tyne to Genoa, Kingdom of Sardinia. She was refloated and put in to Ramsgate in a leaky condition.
Mary Ann	United Kingdom	The schooner was driven ashore and wrecked near Gallipoli, Ottoman Empire. She was on a voyage from Barcelona, Spain to Gallipoli.
Nuestra Señora del Carmen	Spain	The brig was driven ashore and wrecked on the south coast of the Isle of Wight. Her crew survived. She was on a voyage from Bilbao to a Norwegian port.
Ocean	United Kingdom	The schooner was driven ashore and wrecked at Newhaven, Sussex. Her seven crew were rescued by the Newhaven Lifeboat and a lifeboat from the steamship Orleans (Flag unknown). Ocean was on a voyage from Newcastle upon Tyne, Northumberland to Plymouth, Devon.
Petite Emma	France	The schooner was driven ashore and wrecked at Ramsgate. Her crew were rescued. She was on a voyage from Sunderland to Nantes.
Pointer	United States	The ship ran aground on the Colorados, off the coast of Cuba. Her crew were rescued. She was on a voyage from Newport, Rhode Island to Havana, Cuba. She was declared a total loss.
Riga	United Kingdom	The brig was driven ashore and wrecked at Höganäs, Sweden. Her crew were rescued.
Spray	United Kingdom	The brig ran aground on the Holm Sand, in the North Sea off the coast of Suffolk. She was on a voyage from Sunderland to London. She was refloated but sank off Corton, Suffolk. Her crew were rescued by a Pakefield yawl.
Temeraria	Portugal	The barque was driven ashore and wrecked at "Barnsey", on the south west coast of the Isle of Wight with the loss of three of her crew. She was on a voyage from the River Tyne to Porto.
Thomas James	United Kingdom	The ship was wrecked on "Port Nova Island", Nova Scotia, British North America. She was on a voyage from Gloucester to Quebec City, Province of Canada, British North America.

== 9 October ==
List of shipwrecks: 9 October 1857
Ship	State	Description
A. M. Kimball	United States	The full-rigged ship was wrecked on the Goodwin Sands, Kent, United Kingdom. Her crew were rescued. She was on a voyage from Sunderland, County Durham, United Kingdom to Portland, Maine.
Coldstream	United Kingdom	The ship ran aground on the Brake Sand. She was on a voyage from Sunderland to Saint-Malo, Ille-et-Vilaine, France. She was refloated and put in to Ramsgate, Kent in a leaky condition.
Commerce	United Kingdom	The brig foundered 20 to 25 nautical miles (37 to 46 km) off the Outer Gabbard Sand. Her crew were rescued by the schooner Regina (Hamburg). Commerce was on a voyage from Sunderland to Lisbon, Portugal.
Emperor	United Kingdom	The ship was driven ashore at Fécamp, Pas-de-Calais, France with the loss of eight of her crew. She was on a voyage from Newcastle upon Tyne, Northumberland to Paris, France.
European	United Kingdom	The ship was driven ashore at Kirkwall, Orkney Islands. She was on a voyage from the River Tyne to Matanzas, Cuba. She was refloated and taken in to Aberdeen for repairs.
Fancy	United Kingdom	The schooner sank at Padstow, Cornwall.
Parisienne	France	The ship was wrecked at Brest, Finistère with the loss of five of her crew.
Symmetry	United Kingdom	The barque foundered off Ouessant, Finistère with the loss of all hands.
Warden	United States	The barque was wrecked on the Santon Sands, Devon, United Kingdom with the loss of eight of her twelve crew. She was on a voyage from Newport, Monmouthshire, United Kingdom to Boston, Massachusetts.

== 10 October ==
List of shipwrecks: 10 October 1857
Ship	State	Description
Butjadingen	Grand Duchy of Oldenburg	The steamship was abandoned in the North Sea 60 nautical miles (110 km) off Lowestoft, Suffolk, United Kingdom. All on board were rescued by a Norwegian schooner. She was on a voyage from Bremen to London, United Kingdom.
Clarissa	(United Kingdom of Great Britain and Ireland) New South Wales	The schooner sprang a leak and was beached at Port Stephens.
Edgar	United Kingdom	The ship ran aground on the Kentish Knock. She was on a voyage from London to Ancona, Papal States. She was refloated and put in to Ramsgate, Kent in a leaky condition.
Harry	(United Kingdom of Great Britain and Ireland) New Zealand	The schooner left New Plymouth on this date, and was not sighted again.
Pauline	Stettin	The schooner capsized in the English Channel 7 nautical miles (13 km) south west of Newhaven, Sussex, United Kingdom with the loss of all hands. She was towed in to Newhaven by the steamships Alar and Dieppe (both United Kingdom) and beached on 14 October.

== 11 October ==
List of shipwrecks: 11 October 1857
Ship	State	Description
Corona	Austrian Empire	The ship was lost at "Kefia", Ottoman Empire.
Henriette	Danzig	The ship was wrecked off Tor Point, County Antrim, United Kingdom. She was on a voyage from the Clyde to Stettin.
Pelican	French Navy	The aviso was in collision with Malabar (United Kingdom) in the English Channel and was severely damaged. She was towed in to Newhaven, Sussex, United Kingdom by Paris and London No.5 (France).

== 12 October ==
List of shipwrecks: 12 October 1857
Ship	State	Description
Essex	United Kingdom	The brig was run ashore at Tunstall, Yorkshire. She was on a voyage from Seaham, County Durham to Rochester, Kent.
James	United Kingdom	The ship sprang a leak and foundered off South Foreland, Kent. Her crew were rescued. She was on a voyage from Sunderland, County Durham to Saint-Malo, Ille-et-Vilaine, France.

== 13 October ==
List of shipwrecks: 13 October 1857
Ship	State	Description
Alhambra	United Kingdom	The ship was wrecked at Madras, India.
Stirling	United Kingdom	The steamship was driven ashore on Ven, Sweden. She was on a voyage from Leith, Lothian to Kronstadt, Russia. She was refloated on 15 October and taken in to Helsingør, Denmark.
Twe Broeders	Netherlands	The ship was driven ashore at the entrance to the Agger Canal, Denmark. She was on a voyage from a Scottish port to Harburg.

== 14 October ==
List of shipwrecks: 14 October 1857
Ship	State	Description
Adelaide Packet	(United Kingdom of Great Britain and Ireland) South Australia	The schooner was caught in a heavy swell and blown on shore at Toupeka Beach on New Zealand's Chatham Island, with the loss of one life.
Adolphe Laure	France	The barque was in collision with Rhone (United Kingdom) and was abandoned with the presumed loss of two lives. Her crew were rescued by Rhone. Adolphe Laure was on a voyage from Marseille, Bouches-du-Rhône to Buenos Aires, Argentina.
Antelope	United States	The schooner was wrecked off Cape Palmas, Liberia.
Fawn	United States	The schooner was wrecked off Cape Palmas.

== 15 October ==
List of shipwrecks: 15 October 1857
Ship	State	Description
Algernon Percy	United Kingdom	The barque was wrecked at Ras Ghareb, Egypt. Her crew were rescued. She was on a voyage from Sunderland, County Durham to Suez, Egypt.
Archibald Glen	United Kingdom	The ship was wrecked on a rock off Tiger Island, in the Macassar Strait. Her crew survived. She was on a voyage from Manila, Spanish East Indies to London.
Belle	United Kingdom	The brig was wrecked on the French Reef. She was on a voyage from Jamaica to Halifax, Nova Scotia, British North America.
Nonpareil	(United Kingdom of Great Britain and Ireland) Victoria	The ship ran aground on the Lonsdale Reef, off Melbourne. Her passengers were taken off the next day.
Tropic	United States	The paddle steamer struck a sunken object and sank in the Missouri River with the loss of twelve or fifteen lives.
Westbourne	United Kingdom	The ship was driven ashore at Dulas, Anglesey. She was on a voyage from Liverpool, Lancashire to British Honduras. She was refloated on 17 October and put back to Liverpool.

== 16 October ==
List of shipwrecks: 16 October 1857
Ship	State	Description
Catherine	United Kingdom	The brig was driven ashore and wrecked at Hollesley Bay, Suffolk. Her crew were rescued.
Forest State	United States	The ship was wrecked on the Mussel Shoals, off the Bahamas.
Hero	Russia	The steamship was driven ashore on Osmussaar. Her passengers were taken off.
Lachs	United Kingdom	The ship was beached at Hudiksvall, Sweden. She was refloated on 23 October and resumed her voyage to London.

== 17 October ==
List of shipwrecks: 17 October 1857
Ship	State	Description
Grethe	Sweden	The ship ran aground on the Sunk Sand, in the North Sea off the coast of Essex, United Kingdom. She was on a voyage from Kalmar to Gibraltar. She was refloated and towed in to Grimsby, Lincolnshire, United Kingdom, where she arrived on 20 October.
Mary Welch	United Kingdom	The schooner was wrecked on The Stones, off Godrevy Island, Cornwall with the loss of all six crew. She was on a voyage from Cardiff, Glamorgan to Hayle, Cornwall.
Tay	United Kingdom	The ship was driven ashore at Cape Eagle, Anticosti Island. Nova Scotia, British North America. She was on a voyage from Fleetwood, Lancashire to Quebec City, Province of Canada, British North America.
Thomas and Betsey	United Kingdom	The ship collided with Lively (United Kingdom) and sank in the North Sea off the Spurn Lighthouse, Yorkshire. Her crew were rescued by Lively. Thomas and Betsey was on a voyage from South Shields, County Durham to Strood, Kent.
Triton	United Kingdom	The schooner was driven ashore at Narva, Russia with some loss of life.
Union	United Kingdom	The ship was abandoned off Trevose Head, Cornwall. She was on a voyage from Swansea, Glamorgan to Seville, Spain. Union was subsequently taken in to St. Ives, Cornwall.

== 18 October ==
List of shipwrecks: 18 October 1857
Ship	State	Description
Pélican	French Navy	The aviso collided with the barque Malabar (United Kingdom in the English Channel off Newhaven, Sussex, United Kingdom and was severely damaged. She was taken in tow by Malabar, which subsequently transferred the tow to the steamships London and Paris (both United Kingdom), which vessels towed her in to Newhaven.
Schroeder	France	The ship was abandoned in the Atlantic Ocean. Her crew were rescued by Requiem (France).

== 19 October ==
List of shipwrecks: 19 October 1857
Ship	State	Description
Alwilda	United States	The schooner was wrecked 8 nautical miles (15 km) north of Great-Point-au-Sable, Michigan. Her crew survived. She was on a voyage from Chicago, Illinois to "Twin Rivers".
B. Whitney	United States	The schooner was driven ashore and wrecked in Lake Michigan.
Countess	United Kingdom	The ship was driven ashore at Ross, Northumberland. She was on a voyage from Arkhangelsk, Russia to Grimsby, Lincolnshire. She was refloated on 21 October and towed in to Lindisfarne, Northumberland.
James McBride	United States	The brigantine was forced ashore in a storm and wrecked near Sleeping Bear Point in Lake Michigan.
Reindeer	(United Kingdom of Great Britain and Ireland) British North America	The paddle steamer was driven ashore and wrecked 8 nautical miles (15 km) north of Great-Point-au-Sable with the loss of all but two of the 23 people on board. She was on a voyage from Montreal, Province of Canada to St. Joseph, Michigan and Kingston, Province of Canada.
Stanart	United States	The brig sank off Old Mackinack Point, Michigan.
Violet	United Kingdom	The ship was in collision with the barque Sir Charles Napier (United Kingdom) and was abandoned in the North Sea off Dimlington, Yorkshire. Her crew were rescued by Sir Charls Napier. Violet was later towed in to Grimsby, Lincolnshire in a severely damaged condition.

== 20 October ==
List of shipwrecks: 20 October 1857
Ship	State	Description
Helena Brons	Netherlands	The ship was abandoned in the Atlantic Ocean 120 nautical miles (220 km) of Lisbon, Portugal. Her crew were rescued by was on a voyage from Livorno, Grand Duchy of Tuscany to Antwerp, Belgium.
Magna Charta	United Kingdom	The barque ran aground and broke her back on the Insand, in the River Tyne.
Marianne	Hamburg	The ship foundered north east of Schiermonnikoog, Friesland, Netherlands. Her crew survived. She was on a voyage from Harburg to Middlesbrough, Yorkshire, United Kingdom.
Moffat	United Kingdom	The ship ran aground in the Gulf of Saint Lawrence and was severely damaged. She was on a voyage from Quebec City, Province of Canada, British North America to London. She was refloated the next day and resumed her voyage, but consequently put in to Cork, where she arrived on 2 December.

== 21 October ==
List of shipwrecks: 21 October 1857
Ship	State	Description
Arabeau	United Kingdom	The ship was wrecked at "St. Augustine's", Labrador, British North America. Her crew were rescued. She was on a voyage from Miramichi, New Brunswick, British North America to Queenstown, County Cork.
Belvidere	United Kingdom	The ship was driven ashore at St. Stefanos Point, in the Dardanelles. She was on a voyage from Odesa to Falmouth, Cornwall or Queenstown.
Devonshire	United Kingdom	The steamship ran aground at Netley, Hampshire whilst trying to avoid a collision with a fishing boat. She was on a voyage from Dublin to Southampton, Hampshire and London. She was refloated and resumed her voyage.
Earl of Errol	United Kingdom	The brig sprang a leak and was run ashore at St. Ann's Head, Pembrokeshire. Her crew were rescued. She was on a voyage from Newcastle upon Tyne, Northumberland to Dublin.
Marco Polo	Russia	The ship ran aground on the Seskar Reef, in the Baltic Sea. She was refloated and put back to Kronstadt in a leaky condition.
Maria Anna	Kingdom of Hanover	The ship was in collision with a barque and was abandoned by all but one of her crew, who got aboard the barque. She was on a voyage from Termunterzijl, Groningen, Netherlands to Liverpool, Lancashire, United Kingdom. She was taken in to Newhaven, Sussex, United Kingdom on 24 October.
Oxel	Sweden	The schooner ran aground on the Scroby Sands, Norfolk, United Kingdom. She was on a voyage from Malmö to London. She was refloated and taken in to Great Yarmouth, Norfolk.
Rowley	United Kingdom	The brig collided with the brig Gefion (Hamburg) and sank off the Owers Sandbank, in the English Channel off the coast of Sussex. Her crew were rescued by Gefion. Rowley was on a voyage from South Shields, County Durham to Algiers, Algeria.
St. Catherine	United Kingdom	The ship was run down and sunk in the North Sea off Happisburgh, Norfolk by the steamship Albert (United Kingdom) with the loss of two of her crew. She was on a voyage from Hartlepool, County Durham to London.

== 22 October ==
List of shipwrecks: 22 October 1857
Ship	State	Description
Anna Maria	Netherlands	The schooner was in collision with Conradine (Flag unknown) and sank with the loss of a crew member. She was on a voyage from Delfzijl, Groningen to Cardiff, Glamorgan, United Kingdom.
Balmoral	United Kingdom	The ship was driven ashore and wrecked at Sheringham, Norfolk. Her crew were rescued. She was on a voyage from Blyth, Northumberland to Lowestoft, Suffolk.
Betsey	United Kingdom	The ship was driven ashore and wrecked at Sea Palling, Norfolk with the loss of all four crew.
Brothers	United Kingdom	The schooner collided with Mary Ann (United Kingdom) and sank off Lowestoft. Her crew were rescued. She was on a voyage from Hartlepool, County Durham to Southwold, Suffolk.
Caroline	France	The steamship was run into by Caroline Tucker (United Kingdom) and sank at Havre de Grâce, Seine-Inférieure.
Emilie	Stralsund	The ship was driven ashore on Rügen, Prussia. She was on a voyage from Sunderland, County Durham to Swinemünde, Prussia. She was refloated and resumed her voyage.
Fairy	United Kingdom	The schooner was run down and sunk by Clyde (United Kingdom) east of the Isle of Arran with the loss of a crew member.
Hendrik Duponts Minde	Norway	The barque was wrecked on the Haisborough Sands, in the North Sea off the coast of Norfolk with the presumed loss of two of her crew. Survivors were rescued by the fishing vessel Patriot (United Kingdom). Hendrik Duponts Minde was on a voyage from Bresig to Fécamp, Pas-de-Calais, France.
Julie	United Kingdom	The ship ran aground at Dundalk, County Louth. She was on a voyage from Marseille, Bouches-du-Rhône, France to Dundalk.
Mary	United Kingdom	The ship sprang a leak and sank in the North Sea off Aldeburgh, Suffolk. All on board were rescued by John Berry (United Kingdom). Mary was on a voyage from Hartlepool to Milton, Kent.
Naylor	United Kingdom	The brig sank in the North Sea off Great Yarmouth, Norfolk with the loss of all hands. She was on a voyage from Whitby, Yorkshire to Schiedam, South Holland, Netherlands. Wreckage from the ship came ashore between Cromer and Sheringham.
Otilla	Sweden	The ship was driven ashore on Ven. She was on a voyage from Sundsvall to London, United Kingdom. She was refloated and resumed her voyage.
Traveller	United Kingdom	The brig struck the Whitby Rock and sank. Her crew were rescued.
Vivid	United Kingdom	The brig ran aground at Smyrna, Ottoman Empire. She was on a voyage from Newcastle upon Tyne, Northumberland to Smyrna. She was refloated.
Zillah	United Kingdom	The brig was driven ashore and wrecked at Horsey, Norfolk with the loss of six of her nine crew. Survivors were rescued by rocket apparatus. She was on a voyage from Hartlepool to London.

== 23 October ==
List of shipwrecks: 23 October 1857
Ship	State	Description
Angela	United Kingdom	The barque was destroyed by fire and sank at Mangalore, India. She was on a voyage from South Shields, County Durham to Bombay, India.
Argo	United Kingdom	The schooner was driven ashore at Winterton-on-Sea, Norfolk. Her four crew were rescued. She was on a voyage from Sunderland, County Durham to Great Yarmouth, Norfolk.
Bee	United Kingdom	The ship was wrecked near the Happisburgh Lighthouse, Norfolk. She was on a voyage from Newcastle upon Tyne, Northumberland to London.
Frederick Wilhelm	Flag unknown	The ship sprang a leak and was beached at Flamborough Head, Yorkshire, United Kingdom. She was on a voyage from Sunderland to Stettin.
Jacob A. Westerveldt	United States	The ship was damaged by fire at New York.
Lione	Kingdom of the Two Sicilies	The barque was wrecked on Scroby Sands, Norfolk with the loss of her pilot. Her nine crew were rescued by the tug Emperor (United Kingdom). Leone was on a voyage from the River Tyne to Palermo.
Ontario	United Kingdom	The full-rigged ship was wrecked on the Barber Sand, in the North Sea off the coast of Norfolk with the loss of all but one of the 25 people on board. She was on a voyage from South Shields, County Durham to Suez, Egypt.
Robert and Anne	United Kingdom	The brig was wrecked on the Scroby Sands. Her crew were rescued by the fishing lugger William and Mary (United Kingdom). Robert and Anne was on a voyage from the River Wear to Saint-Malo, Ille-et-Vilaine, France.
South Durham	United Kingdom	The ship was wrecked on Scroby Sands with the loss of six of her eight crew. survivors were rescued by the tug Emperor (United Kingdom). South Durham was on a voyage from Sunderland to London.
Stork	United Kingdom	The schooner capsized in the River Thames near London Bridge. All on board were rescued.
Sutors	United Kingdom	The schooner was driven ashore and wrecked south of Gorleston, Suffolk. Her crew were rescued. She was on a voyage from Sunderland to Great Yarmouth. She had become a wreck by 2 November.
Sydenham	United Kingdom	The steamship was driven ashore on Naissaar, Russia. She was on a voyage from Hull, Yorkshire to Grimsby, Lincolnshire and Saint Petersburg, Russia.
Two True Friends	United Kingdom	The sloop was driven ashore at Gorleston. She was on a voyage from Sunderland to London. She was refloated on 30 October and taken in to Great Yarmouth.
Venus	United Kingdom	The brig was driven ashore at Lowestoft. She was on a voyage from London to Sunderland. She was refloated and resumed her voyage.
Victor	United Kingdom	The ship was driven ashore and wrecked at Tetney Haven, Lincolnshire. Her crew were rescued. She was on a voyage from Rouen, Seine-Inférieure, France to Newcastle upon Tyne, Northumberland.
William and Ann	United Kingdom	The ship was driven ashore at The Naze, Essex. She was refloated and taken in to Harwich, Essex.

== 24 October ==
List of shipwrecks: 24 October 1857
Ship	State	Description
Acshah	United Kingdom	The ship was driven ashore at Lowestoft, Suffolk. She was on a voyage from Hartlepool, County Durham to London. She was refloated on 30 October and taken in to Lowestoft in a leaky condition.
Brothers	United Kingdom	The schooner was run into by the schooner Mary Ann (United Kingdom) and sank.
Catherine Adamson	United Kingdom	The ship was wrecked at North Head, New South Wales with the loss of 21 lives.
Her Majesty	United Kingdom	The brig was wrecked at Bacton, Norfolk with the loss of all hands. She was on a voyage from Helsingør, Denmark to London.
Koophandel	Netherlands	The ship was beached at "Sandlemere", on the Holderness coast of Yorkshire, United Kingdom. Her crew were rescued. She was on a voyage from South Shields, County Durham to Groningen. She broke up on 25 October.
Lord Farnham	United Kingdom	The ship sprang a leak and sank at Corton, Suffolk. Her crew were rescued. She was on a voyage from Newcastle upon Tyne, Northumberland to Rotterdam, South Holland, Netherlands.
Princess Charlotte	United Kingdom	The troopship was driven ashore at Barrack Point, County Cork. She was on a voyage from Southampton, Hampshire to Calcutta, India. She was refloated and taken in to Queenstown, County Cork.
San Roque	Spain	The brig was wrecked on the Longsand, in the North Sea off the coast of Essex, United Kingdom with the loss of six of her nine crew. Survivors were rescued by the lugger (United Kingdom). San Roque was on a voyage from Bergen, Norway to Bilbao.
Simon Magus	United Kingdom	The ship was driven ashore at Bolderāja, Russia. She was refloated on 28 October and taken in to Riga, Russia.
Vesta	Prussia	The brig was wrecked on Spurn Point, Yorkshire. Her crew were rescued by a tug. She was on a voyage from Danzig to Grimsby, Lincolnshire, United Kingdom.

== 25 October ==
List of shipwrecks: 25 October 1857
Ship	State	Description
Ægir	Norway	The brig was driven ashore on Spurn Point, Yorkshire, United Kingdom. She was on a voyage from Miramichi, New Brunswick, British North America to Hull, Yorkshire. She was refloated on 30 October and taken in to Hull.
Augusta	United Kingdom	The ship was driven ashore at Terneuzen, Zeeland, Netherlands. She was on a voyage from Ghent, East Flanders, Belgium to Liverpool, Lancashire. She was refloated and resumed her voyage.
Axis	United Kingdom	The ship was driven ashore at Lowestoft, Suffolk.
Fama	Norway	The ship was in collision with another vessel and ran aground. She was on a voyage from Skien to Falmouth, Cornwall, United Kingdom. She was refloated and taken in to Ramsgate, Kent, United Kingdom in a waterlogged condition.
Farnham Castle	United Kingdom	The brig foundered at Lowestoft.
Frederick	United Kingdom	The ship sank off Corton, Suffolk. Her crew were rescued. She was on a voyage from Sunderland, County Durham to Ghent, East Flanders, Belgium.
Henrique	Bremen	The ship ran aground at the mouth of the Rio Grande. She was on a voyage from the Rio Grande to Cork, United Kingdom. She was refloated and put back to the Rio Grance, where she was condemned.
Kadree	United Kingdom	The ship was wrecked near Breaker Point, in the South China Sea. She was on a voyage from Macao to Amoy, China. Her crew abandoned ship, but her captain was taken prisoner. He was released on 16 November after intervention by HMS Inflexible (Royal Navy).
Thames	United Kingdom	The ship was in collision with a barque at Dover, Kent and was consequently beached. She was on a voyage from Middlesbrough, Yorkshire to Calais, France.
Vulcan	United Kingdom	The sloop was driven ashore near Wexford with the loss of two of her crew.
Unnamed	United Kingdom	The brig struck a rock and sank off the Barbary Coast with the loss of four of her eight crew. She was on a voyage from Alexandria, Egypt to Cork.

== 26 October ==
List of shipwrecks: 26 October 1857
Ship	State	Description
Anna Letitia	United Kingdom	The ship sprang a leak whilst on a voyage from Cork to London. She put back to Cork, where she ran aground.
Comet	Belgium	The steamship collided with another vessel and sank near "Nieuw Diep" with the loss of four lives. She was on a voyage from Antwerp to Hamburg.
Mary	United Kingdom	The ship was driven ashore at New Romney, Kent. She was on a voyage from Sunderland, County Durham to New Romney. She was refloated on 2 November and taken in to Folkestone, Kent in a leaky condition.
Napoleon	France	The steamship was driven ashore on Hiiumaa, Russia. She was on a voyage from Hull, Yorkshire, United Kingdom to Kronstadt, Russia.
William Chase	United Kingdom	The ship was beached at Youghal, County Cork . She was on a voyage from London to Charleston, South Carolina, United States.
Yamacraw	United Kingdom)	The paddle steamer was wrecked on the Mariners Reef, off the coast of Cuba.

== 27 October ==
List of shipwrecks: 27 October 1857
Ship	State	Description
Hannah Jane	United Kingdom	The schooner struck a sunken rock off Ballyhalbert, County Down and was damaged. She was on a voyage from Ardrossan, Ayrshire to Livorno, Grand Duchy of Tuscany. She consequently put in to Donaghadee, County Down.
HMS Medina	Royal Navy	The Merlin-class packet boat ran aground in the Kilia Channel. She was refloated with the aid of Authion ( Royal Sardinian Navy).
Nestor	United Kingdom	The ship was driven ashore on Prince Edward Island, British North America. She was on a voyage from Carlisle, Cumberland to Miramichi, New Brunswick, British North America. She was consequently condemned.
Nil Desperandum	United Kingdom	The ship was driven ashore and wrecked at Carbonear, Newfoundland, British North America. Her crew were rescued.

== 28 October ==
List of shipwrecks: 28 October 1857
Ship	State	Description
Bangalore	United Kingdom	The ship was driven ashore on the coast of Newfoundland, British North America in a derelict condition. She was on a voyage from Quebec City, Province of Canada, British North America to Fowey, Cornwall. She had been abandoned in the Gulf of Saint Lawrence. All fifteen people on board had been rescued by Sir Colin Campbell (United Kingdom).
Burgermeister Ohm	Netherlands	The ship ran aground on the Whitburn Steel Rock, off the coasts of County Durham, United Kingdom. She was on a voyage from Danzig to Sunderland, County Durham. She was refloated and taken in to Sunderland.
Flora	Netherlands	The barque sprang a leak in the South China Sea. She was taken in to Hongpoe Bay, where she sank. She was on a voyage from Hong Kong to Amoy, China.
Nestor	United Kingdom	The ship was lost off Prince Edward Island, British North America. She was on a voyage from Carlisle, Cumberland to Miramichi, New Brunswick, British North America.
Noticioso	Spain	The brig was abandoned in the Atlantic Ocean. Her crew were rescued by Hannah Secor (United States). Noticioso was on a voyage form Havana, Cuba to Hamburg.
Sir Hector	United Kingdom	The smack foundered off the Mull of Galloway, Argyllshire. Her crew were rescued.

== 29 October ==
List of shipwrecks: 29 October 1857
Ship	State	Description
Anna Christina	Sweden	The ship was driven ashore on Skagen, Denmark. She was on a voyage from South Shields, County Durham, United Kingdom to Stockholm.
De La Gardia	Sweden	The steamship ran aground on the Scroby Sands, Norfolk, United Kingdom. She was on a voyage from Gothenburg to London, United Kingdom. She was refloated and taken in to Great Yarmouth, Norfolk.
Lady of the Lake	United Kingdom	The barque was wrecked at Point St. Peter, Province of Canada, British North America. She was on a voyage from Aberdeen to Quebec City, Province of Canada.
Marie	United Kingdom	The ship was driven ashore and wrecked on Prince Edward Island, British North America. Her crew were rescued. She was on a voyage from Milford Haven, Pembrokeshire to Chaleur Bay.
Mercury, and Palendar	United Kingdom	Mercury was in collision with the brig Palendar. She was beached and scuttled at Drigg, Cumberland. Palendar was wrecked. Her crew were rescued.
Peace	United Kingdom	The barque was destroyed by fire off Cape North, Nova Scotia, British North America. Her crew were rescued. She was on a voyage from Richibucto, New Brunswick, British North America to London.

== 30 October ==
List of shipwrecks: 30 October 1857
Ship	State	Description
Abundance	France	The steamship was driven ashore on Saaremaa, Russia. She was on a voyage from Havre de Grâce, Seine-Inférieure to Kronstadt, Russia.

== 31 October ==
List of shipwrecks: 31 October 1857
Ship	State	Description
Anna Gibson	United Kingdom	The schooner ran aground on Knivestone, in the Farne Islands, Northumberland. She was on a voyage from the Clyde to Hull, Yorkshire. She was refloated and taken in to North Sunderland, County Durham.
Banshee	United Kingdom	The ship was damaged by fire at Sunderland, County Durham.
Conheath	United Kingdom	The ship ran aground on the Quazle Bank, in the River Plate. She was on a voyage from Gualeguay, Argentina to an English port. She was refloated on 7 November and taken in to Montevideo, Uruguay.
Cumberland Lass	United Kingdom	The ship was driven ashore east of Blakeney, Norfolk. She was on a voyage from Exeter, Devon to Hartlepool, County Durham. She was refloated and resumed her voyage.
Letitia	United Kingdom	The collier, a schooner, was in collision with the steamship Eagle (United Kingdom) and sank in the North Sea 18 nautical miles (33 km) off the mouth of the Humber with the loss of a crew member. Survivors were rescued by Eagle. Letitia was on a voyage from Sunderland, County Durham to Littlehampton, Sussex.

== Unknown date ==
List of shipwrecks: Unknown date in October 1857
Ship	State	Description
Adventure	United Kingdom	The brig was wrecked on Ouessant, Finistère, France with the loss of all hands. She was on a voyage from Cádiz, Spain to Plymouth, Devon.
Adventurer	United Kingdom	The schooner foundered in the Atlantic Ocean with the loss of all hands. Wreckage from the vessel washed up on the French coast. She was on a voyage from Barcelona, Spain to London.
Ardwell, and Maid of Kent	United Kingdom	The ships collided and were both severely damaged.
Aristides	United Kingdom	The ship was driven ashore and wrecked at Rio Real, Brazil before 19 October. Her crew survived. She was on a voyage from Glasgow, Renfrewshire to Buenos Aires, Argentina.
Brownfield	United Kingdom	The ship ran aground on the Copt Rocks. She was on a voyage from Newcastle upon Tyne, Northumberland to Plymouth, Devon. She was refloated and put in to Dover, Kent in a leaky condition.
Bruce, or Prince	Flag unknown	The barque was abandoned in the Atlantic Ocean before 30 October.
Charles	United Kingdom	The collier, a brig, was in collision with Progress (United Kingdom) and sank in the English Channel off Hastings, Sussex. Her crew were rescued by Progress. Charles was on a voyage from South Shields, County Durham to Teignmouth, Devon.
Countess	United Kingdom	The ship was driven ashore on the Ross Sands, Northumberland before 20 October. She was on avoyage from Arkhangelsk, Russia to Grimsby, Lincolnshire.
Elizabeth	United Kingdom	The barque was presumed to have foundered in a hurricane. She was on a voyage from British Honduras to an English port.
Emergo	United Kingdom	The ship was driven ashore at "Lapaua". She was on a voyage from Newcastle upon Tyne to Hong Kong. She was refloated.
Erin	United Kingdom	The ship was driven ashore at Dungeness, Kent. She was refloated on 18 October and towed in to Dover.
Fame	United Kingdom	The brig was in collision with the schooner Lamplighter (United Kingdom) and sank in the North Sea off the coast of Yorkshire. Her crew were rescued by Lamplighter.
Garnison	United States	The full-rigged ship was abandoned in the Atlantic Ocean off the Azores before 8 October.
Harriet	United Kingdom	The brig was presumed to have foundered in a hurricane. She was on a voyage from British Honduras to an English port.
Heron	Norway	The barque was abandoned in the Atlantic Ocean.
Hilda	Sweden	The ship foundered in the Bay of Biscay before 13 October. her crew were rescued by the schooner Anais (France). Hilda was on a voyage from Cardiff, Glamorgan, United Kingdom to Rio de Janeiro, Brazil.
Hope	India	The lightship was run into by another vessel and lost at the mouth of the Mutlah River before 6 October.
Hosea Ballou	United States	The schooner was lost in the Bay of St. Lawrence. Crew saved.
Independent	United Kingdom	The ship was driven ashore at Kronstadt, Russia. She was on a voyage from the River Tyne to Kronstadt. She had been refloated by 30 October.
Kossuth	United Kingdom	The barque ran aground on the Matanilla Reef, off Grand Bahama, Bahamas before 26 October.
Lima	United Kingdom	The ship foundered in the English Channel off the coast of Sussex between 15 and 22 October. She was on a voyage from The Downs to Valparaíso, Chile. Wreckage from the ship washed up at Pagham, Sussex.
Linden	United Kingdom	The barque foundered in the Atlantic Ocean. Five of her crew were rescued by Jessie Miller (United Kingdom). Also reported as London, foundering before 3 October with her crew being rescued by Mary Miller ( (United Kingdom of Great Britain and Ireland) ). The ship was on a voyage from Liverpool to Newfoundland.
Mary Hart	United States	The schooner was lost at Cape Breton. Crew saved.
Medora	United Kingdom	The ship foundered off Ringkøbing, Denmark before 2 October with the loss of at least six lives.
Montezuma	United States	The schooner was lost at Cape Breton. Crew saved.
Ouse	United Kingdom	The ship was driven ashore before 20 October. She was refloated and taken in to Gothenburg, Sweden for repairs.
Peeping Tom	United Kingdom	The ship was driven ashore on the coast of Sierra Leone before 19 October. She was consequently condemned.
Primo	(United Kingdom of Great Britain and Ireland) New South Wales	The ship foundered in the Pacific Ocean. She was on a voyage from Sydney to Honolulu, Hawaii.
Queen	United Kingdom	The brig was lost off Hogland, Russia before 13 October. Her crew were rescued. She was on a voyage from Hartlepool, County Durham to Saint Petersburg, Russia.
Richard Anderson	United States	The full-rigged ship was abandoned in the Atlantic Ocean before 4 October. She was on a voyage from Rotterdam, South Holland, Netherlands to Baltimore, Maryland.
Sarah	United Kingdom	The full-rigged ship was driven ashore on Corisco, Spanish Guinea before 26 October. Her crew were rescued. She was on a voyage from Glasgow to Corisco. She was consequently condemned.
Skoomand	Flag unknown	The ship was lost in the Gulf of Bothnia.
Sophie Catherine	Flag unknown	The ship was abandoned in the Gulf of Gascony before 11 October.
Spey	United Kingdom	The brig ran aground on the Holm Sand, in the North Sea off the coast of Suffolk. She floated off, drove into two other vessels and sank off Corton, Suffolk. Her crew were rescued.
Spurn	United Kingdom	The steamship was driven ashore on "Digskar" before 17 October. She was on a voyage from Kronstadt to Hull, Yorkshire. She floated off and sank. Her crew were rescued.
Suitor	United Kingdom	The ship was driven ashore at "Lapauca" before 14 October. She was on a voyage from Newcastle upon Tyne to Hong Kong. She was refloated.
Susan Crisp	(United Kingdom of Great Britain and Ireland) Cape Colony	The ship was wrecked in Plettenberg Bay before 8 October. She was on a voyage from Algoa Bay to Plettenberg Bay.
Télemaque	French Navy	The steamship ran aground on the St. Rosas Shoal. She was on a voyage from Pará, Brazil to Cayenne, French Guiana.
Warburton	United Kingdom	The ship ran aground on the Minigougan Shoals. She was refloated and put back to Quebec City, Province of Canada.
