= White Bear Bay =

Bay on Newfoundland, Canada

Coordinates: 47.6886111°N 57.3138889°W

White Bear Bay is natural bay on the island of Newfoundland in the province of Newfoundland and Labrador, Canada. The Ramea islands are south of the bay. The bay is filled with fjords, valleys and massive waterfalls which makes it a well known tourist spot. Many people own cabins in the bay to temporarily live there.

White Bear Bay was also the name of a now abandoned community within the bay. It was settled by the early 1800s and abandoned after 1901.
