= HMS Medusa (1838) =

History

United Kingdom
- Name: Medusa
- Namesake: Medusa
- Ordered: 10 March 1838
- Builder: Pembroke Dockyard
- Laid down: May 1838
- Launched: 31 October 1838
- Completed: 12 August 1839
- Commissioned: 8 August 1839
- Reclassified: As tugboat, 1861–1862
- Fate: Sold for scrap, 17 February 1872

General characteristics (as built)
- Class & type: Merlin-class packet boat
- Tons burthen: 889 14/94 bm
- Length: 175 ft (53.3 m) (Gun deck); 153 ft 6 in (46.8 m) (Keel)
- Beam: 33 ft 2 in (10.1 m)
- Depth: 16 ft 5 in (5.0 m)
- Installed power: 312 nhp
- Propulsion: 2 × Steam engines
- Armament: 2 × 6-pdr carronades

HMS Medusa was one of three 2-gun Merlin-class paddle packet boat built for the Royal Navy during the 1830s. She was converted into a tugboat in 1861–1862 and sold for scrap in 1872.

== Description ==
Merlin had a length at the gun deck of 175 feet (53.3 m) and 153 feet 6 inches (46.8 m) at the keel. She had a beam of 33 feet 2 inches (10.1 m), and a depth of hold of 16 feet 5 inches (5.0 m). The ship's tonnage was 889 14/94 tons burthen. The Medusa class was fitted with a pair of steam engines, rated at 312 nominal horsepower, that drove their paddlewheels. The ships were armed with a pair of 6-pounder carronades.

== Construction and career ==
Medusa, the fourth ship of her name to serve in the Royal Navy, was ordered on 10 March 1838, laid down two months later at Pembroke Dockyard, Wales, and launched on 31 October of that same year. She was completed on 12 August 1839 and had been commissioned four days earlier. The ship was initially based at Liverpool for packet service in the Irish Sea. Medusa was modified in 1848 for service in the Mediterranean Sea.

On 28 November 1849, Medusa ran aground at Marseille, Bouches-du-Rhône, France, whilst conveying mails from London to India. She was refloated and put back to Marseille with a broken rudder. The mails were forwarded in the French Government steamship Leonidas. On 14 March 1851, Medusa collided with the British brig Caroline in Grand Harbour, Malta, as she was leaving port. A court found Medusa was to blame and awarded compensation to the owners of Caroline.

Medusa was converted into a tugboat in 1861–1862 at Woolwich. She was paid off on 15 December 1871 and sold for scrap on 17 February 1872.
