= HMS Merlin (1838) =

Name ship of class of three 2-gun paddle packet boats

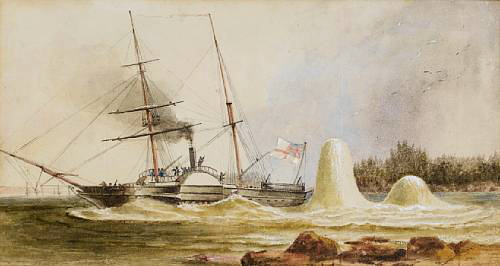
- The survey vessel Merlin narrowly escaping destruction by two Russian mines off Sveaborg early in August 1855 by John Wilson Carmichael

History

United Kingdom
- Name: Merlin
- Ordered: 10 March 1838
- Builder: Pembroke Dockyard
- Laid down: April 1838
- Launched: 18 September 1838
- Completed: April 1839
- Commissioned: 20 April 1839
- Reclassified: As gunvessel, 1856
- Fate: Sold, 18 May 1863

General characteristics (as built)
- Class & type: Merlin-class packet boat
- Tons burthen: 889 14/94 bm
- Length: 175 ft (53.3 m) (Gun deck); 153 ft 6 in (46.8 m) (Keel)
- Beam: 33 ft 2 in (10.1 m)
- Depth: 16 ft 5 in (5.0 m)
- Installed power: 312 nhp
- Propulsion: 2 × Steam engines
- Armament: 2 × 6-pdr carronades

HMS Merlin was the name ship of her class of three 2-gun paddle packet boats built for the Royal Navy during the 1830s. She was converted into a survey ship in 1854 and then into a gunvessel two years later. The ship was decommissioned in 1858 and was sold into commercial service in 1863.

== Description ==
Merlin had a length at the gun deck of 175 feet (53.3 m) and 153 feet 6 inches (46.8 m) at the keel. She had a beam of 33 feet 2 inches (10.1 m), and a depth of hold of 16 feet 5 inches (5 m). The ship's tonnage was 889 14/94 tons burthen. The Medusa class was fitted with a pair of steam engines, rated at 312 nominal horsepower, that drove their paddlewheels. The ships were armed with a pair of 6-pounder carronades.

== Construction and career ==
Merlin, the twelfth ship of her name to serve in the Royal Navy, was ordered on 10 March 1838, laid down the following month at Pembroke Dockyard, Wales, and launched on 18 September 1838. She was completed in April 1839 and commissioned on 20 April. The ship was initially based at Liverpool for packet service in the Irish Sea. Merlin was modified in 1848 for service in the Mediterranean Sea.

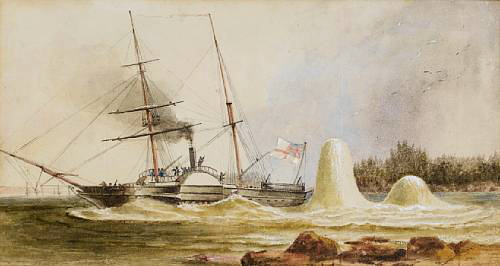
The survey vessel Merlin narrowly escaping destruction by two Russian mines off Sveaborg in early in August 1855 by John Wilson Carmichael

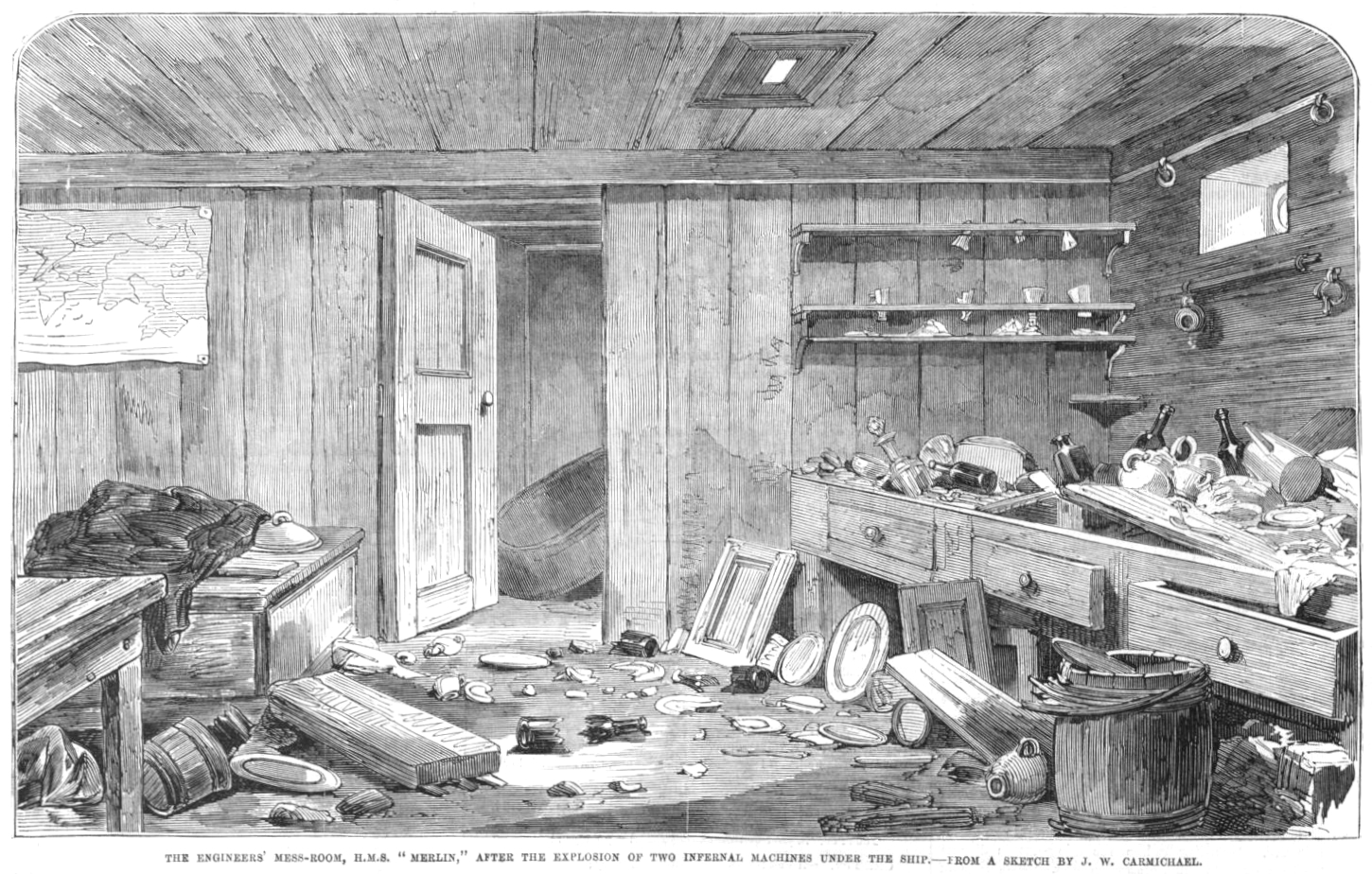
The Engineers' mess-room, after the explosion of two infernal machines under the ship, Illustrated London News

She was converted into a survey vessel in 1854 and was transferred to the Baltic Sea the following year. The ship was converted into a gunboat in 1856 and was transferred to the West Coast of Africa Station in May of that year. Merlin was paid off on 23 April 1858, listed for sale on 18 September 1861 and sold on 18 May 1863. Her purchaser, A. E. Williams & Co., intended to use her for commercial service and renamed her Sea Hawk.
