= HMS Medina (1840) =

History

United Kingdom
- Name: Medina
- Ordered: 30 March 1838
- Builder: Pembroke Dockyard
- Laid down: June 1839
- Launched: 18 March 1840
- Completed: April 1840
- Commissioned: 19 October 1848
- Reclassified: As survey ship, 7 January 1856
- Fate: Broken up, March 1864

General characteristics (as built)
- Class & type: Merlin-class packet boat
- Tons burthen: 889 14/94 bm
- Length: 175 ft (53.3 m) (Gun deck); 153 ft 6 in (46.8 m) (Keel)
- Beam: 33 ft 2 in (10.1 m)
- Depth: 16 ft 5 in (5.0 m)
- Installed power: 312 nhp
- Propulsion: 2 × Steam engines
- Armament: 2 × 6-pdr carronades

HMS Medina was a 2-gun Merlin-class paddle packet boat built for the Royal Navy during the 1830s. The ship remained in ordinary until she was commissioned in 1848. She was converted into a survey ship in 1856 and was broken up in March 1864.

== Description ==
Medina had a length at the gun deck of 175 feet (53.3 m) and 153 feet 6 inches (46.8 m) at the keel. She had a beam of 33 feet 2 inches (10.1 m), and a depth of hold of 16 feet 5 inches (5.0 m). The ship's tonnage was 889 14/94 tons burthen. The Medusa class was fitted with a pair of steam engines, rated at 312 nominal horsepower, that drove their paddlewheels. The ships were armed with a pair of 6-pounder carronades.

== Construction and career ==
Medina, the twelfth ship of her name to serve in the Royal Navy, was ordered on 30 March 1838, laid down in June 1839 at Pembroke Dockyard, Wales, and launched on 18 March 1840. She was completed in April 1840, but was not commissioned until 19 October 1848 for packet duties in the Mediterranean.

During the Crimean War, she collided with the British barque Agnes Blaikie in the Black Sea off Balaklava, Russia; Agnes Blaikie sank, but her crew were rescued.

Medina was converted into a survey ship on 7 January 1856. On 27 October 1857, she ran aground in the Kilia Channel. She was refloated with the assistance of the Royal Sardinian Navy steamship Authion. In August 1862, she assisted in the refloating of the British steamship Dalmatian, which had run aground in the Gulf of Smyrna.

Medina was paid off on 10 November 1863 at Malta and scrapped in March 1864.
