= Merlin-class packet boat =

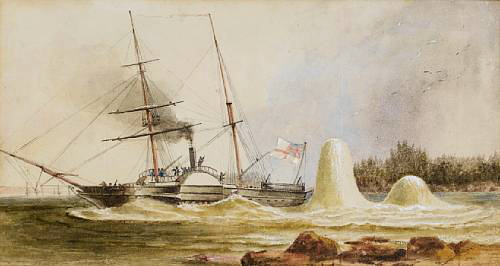
- The survey vessel Merlin narrowly escaping destruction by two Russian mines off Sveaborg early in August 1855 by John Wilson Carmichael

Class overview
- Name: Merlin class
- Builders: Pembroke Dockyard
- Operators: Royal Navy
- Cost: £44,450 (average per vessel)
- Built: 1838–1840
- In service: 1839–1872
- Completed: 3
- Scrapped: 3

General characteristics
- Type: Packet boat
- Tons burthen: 889 14/94 bm
- Length: 175 ft (53.3 m) Gun deck; 153 ft 6 in (46.8 m) Keel for tonnage
- Beam: 33 ft 2 in (10.1 m) maximum; 33 ft 0 in (10.1 m) for tonnage
- Depth: 16 ft 5 in (5.0 m)
- Installed power: 312 nhp
- Propulsion: 2 × Fawcett, Preston & Co steam engines
- Armament: 2 × 6 pdr carronades

The Merlin-class packet boat of 1838 was a Sir William Symonds (the Surveyor of the Navy) design that was approved on 2 April 1838. The vessels were to be built for steam mail packet service on the Liverpool to Dublin route. The initial two ships (Merlin and Medusa) were ordered in autumn 1838 from Pembroke Dockyard. The third vessel (Medina) was ordered in 1839, also from Pembroke. When completed all vessels were used on the Liverpool station. In 1848 all three were in the Mediterranean on mail packet service. Merlin went to the Baltic during the Russian Was as a survey ship. Medusa went to the Black Sea. Medina remained in the Mediterranean being converted to a survey ship for Mediterranean service. Merlin served on the West Coast of Africa and was sold for commercial use in 1863. Medina was sold at Malta in April 1864. Medusa was converted to a tugboat in 1861 and remained in that service until sold in 1872.

Merlin was the twelfth named vessel since it was used for a 10-gun pinnace, built in 1579 and listed until 1601.

Medusa was the fourth named vessel since it was used for a 50-gun fourth rate, launched at Plymouth Dockyard on 23 July 1785 and wrecked on the coast of Portugal on 26 November 1798.

Medina was the third named vessel since it was used for a six gun yacht (named Portsmouth) launched at Portsmouth Dockyard on 9 January 1702, rebuilt and named Medina in August 1772 and broken in August 1832.

== Design and specifications ==
The first two vessels were laid down in April and May 1838 with the third vessel laid down in June 1839. The first two were launched in autumn 1838 with the last vessel launched in 1840. The ships had a length at the gun deck of 175 feet 0 inches (53.34 metres) with a keel length of 153 feet 6 inches (46.8 metres) reported for tonnage. They had a maximum beam of 33 feet 2 inches (10.11 metres) and 33 feet 0 inches (10.06 metres) reported for the tonnage calculation. Their depth of hold was 16 feet 5 inches (5.00 metres). The ships' tonnage calculation was 889 14/94 tons burthen.

Their machinery was supplied by Fawcett, Preston & Company of Liverpool. They had a pair rectangular fire tube boilers install. They had a pair of vertical single expansion (VSE) steam engines, rated at 312 nominal horsepower, that drove their paddlewheels. The vessels had a very light armament of two 6-pounder carronades mounted.

All vessels were completed at an average cost of £35,276. (Note: An average cost accounting for inflation of approximately £3,381,300 in today's money.) (Note: Average cost compiled by author. Actual break down of actual costs will be given on individual ship articles)

Pembroke-built vessels
| Name | Launch date | Fate |
|---|---|---|
| Merlin | 18 September 1838 | Sold 18 May 1863 |
| Medusa | 31 October 1838 | Sold 17 February 1872 |
| Medina | 18 March 1840 | Broken up March 1864 |
