= Medina (disambiguation) =

Medina is the fourth-most populous city in Saudi Arabia, as well as the second holiest city in Islam.

Medina or Medinah may also refer to:

== Military operations ==
- Battle of Medina, an 1813 battle of the Mexican War of Independence
- Siege of Medina Fort, an 1857 battle in present-day Mali
- Operation Medina, a 1967 Vietnam War search-and-destroy operation

== Music ==
- Medina (album), a 1980 album by Bobby Hutcherson
- Medina (duo), a Swedish hip hop duo
- Medina (singer), Danish singer and songwriter born Andrea Fuentealba Valbak (born 1982)

== People ==
- Medina (given name)
- Medina (surname)
- De Medina, a surname

== Places ==
- Medina quarter, the old quarter of a North African town

=== Antarctica ===
- Mount Medina, Graham Land
- Medina Peaks, Ross Dependency

=== Colombia ===
- Medina Province, Cundinamarca
- Medina, Cundinamarca, a municipality in the Cundinamarca Department

=== United Kingdom ===
- Medina, Isle of Wight, United Kingdom, a former borough
- River Medina, Isle of Wight, United Kingdom

=== United States ===
- Medinah, Illinois, an unincorporated community
  - Medinah Country Club, a golf club in the above community
  - Medinah station
- Medina, Kansas, an unincorporated community
- Medina, Michigan, an unincorporated community
- Medina, Minnesota, a city
- Medina, New York, a village
- Medina, North Dakota, a city
- Medina, Ohio, a city
- Medina County, Ohio
- Medina, Tennessee, a city
- Medina, Bandera County, Texas, an unincorporated community
- Medina, Zapata County, Texas, a census-designated place
- Medina County, Texas
- Medina River, Texas
- Medina Valley, Texas
- Medina, Washington, a city
- Medina, West Virginia, an unincorporated community
- Medina, Wisconsin, a town
- Medina, Outagamie County, Wisconsin, an unincorporated community
- Medina Township (disambiguation)

=== Elsewhere ===
- Medina, Western Australia, a suburb of Perth, Australia
- Medina, Minas Gerais, Brazil, a municipality in the state of Minas Gerais
- Medina, a community in Zorra Township, Ontario, Canada
- Medina, Dominican Republic, a municipal district in San Cristóbal (province)
- Medina, Hungary, a village
- Medina, New Zealand, a locality in Hurunui District
- Medina, Misamis Oriental, Philippines, a 4th class municipality
- Medina, Dakar, Senegal, a commune d'arrondissement of the city of Dakar
- Wadajir District or Medina, a district of Mogadishu, Somalia

== Publications ==
- Medina (magazine), a Spanish weekly women's magazine (1941–1945)
- Madina (Bijnor), an Urdu biweekly newspaper in India (1912–1975)

== Schools ==
- Medina College (disambiguation)
- Medina High School (disambiguation)

== Ships ==
- HMS Medina, a list of Royal Navy ships
- Medina-class gunboat, a class of Royal Navy gunboats built between 1876 and 1877
- List of ships named Medina
- Hunter Medina, a yacht produced by British Hunter boats

== Other uses ==
- MEDINA, a universal pre-/postprocessor for finite element analysis of T-Systems
- Medina (board game)
- Medina (fly), a genus in the family Tachinidae
- The Medina, an 1876 English contract-law case
- Earl of Medina, a title in the Peerage of the United Kingdom
- Medina Dam, Texas
- Museum Medina, Braga, Portugal
- Saunders Medina, a British flying boat of the 1920s

== See also ==
- Madina (disambiguation)
- Madinah (disambiguation)
- Medina de Pomar, a town in Burgos, Spain
- Medina de Rioseco, a town in Valladolid province, Spain
- Medina del Campo, a town in Valladolid province, Spain
- Mdina, Malta, a city
