= Madina (disambiguation) =

Madina is an alternate spelling for Medina, the second holiest city in Islam.

Madina may also refer to:

== Places ==
- Madina, Haryana, a town in Rohtak district in the state of Haryana, India
- Al Madinah Province, Saudi Arabia
- Madina, an alternate transliteration of Medina, Saudi Arabia
- Madina, Armenia
- Madina, Ghana, a town near the capital
- Madina (Ghana parliament constituency)
- Madina, Mali, a commune and town
- Madina, Port Loko District, a locality in Sierra Leone
- Madina Colony (New Karachi Town), Union Council (U.C. # 7) of New Karachi Town, Karachi, Sindh, Pakistan
- Madina Colony (Orangi Town), Union Council (U.C. # 5) of Orangi Town, Karachi, Sindh, Pakistan
- Madina Town, a tehsil-level town of Faisalabad City within Faisalabad District, Punjab, Pakistan
- Al Madina (Abu Dhabi), neighborhood of Abu Dhabi, United Arab Emirates
- Al Madeena Islamic complex
- alternative name for the Wadajir District in Mogadishu, Somalia
- Mandailing Natal Regency, often abbreviated Madina, a regency in North Sumatra, Indonesia

== Media ==
- Al Madina (newspaper), an Arabic language newspaper published in Jeddah, Saudi Arabia
- Al-Madina (Israeli newspaper), an Israeli-Arabic local newspaper

== People ==
- Madina Abilqasymova, Kazakh politician
- Madina Aliyeva, Azerbaijani ballerina
- Madina Memet, Chinese actress
- Madina Mukhtorova, Uzbekistani para-athlete
- Madina Nalwanga, Ugandan actress
- Madina Okot, Kenyan basketball player
- Madina Sadvaqasova, Kazakh female singer

== Sports ==
- Almadina S.C., a Libyan football club sometimes called Madina or Al Madina

== See also ==
- Medina (disambiguation)
- Madinah (disambiguation)
- Medina Mosque (disambiguation)
