= Slipper lamp =

East Mediterranean oil lamp

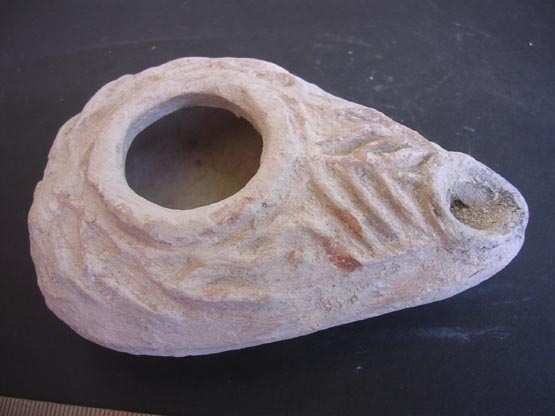
Byzantine period "candlestick" lamp with the typical palm motif. Found in the village Fandaqomiya (Pentacomia).

Slipper lamps are unglazed mould-made clay oil lamps produced in Palestine and later throughout Syria, primarily during the era of Byzantine Empire and the early Islamic (Umayyad and Abbasid) rule there. Like other such lamps from the ancient world, they had a small reservoir for fuel – usually olive oil – in their body, and a length of twisted fiber would be placed into a wick hole and lit to provide light in the darkness.

Slipper lamps were produced using two clay or limestone moulds, pressed together, and are characterised by their almond/ovoid shape and a nozzle integrated into the body. There are several different sub-types (and myriad typological systems) used to categorize and distinguish them, by their markings/inscriptions or particular place of production. Slipper lamp is often used as a synonym for "candlestick" lamps (or luchnaria), but can include other types of lamps of the same form, and has been applied to an identical form that reemerged in the Ayyubid and Mamluk eras.

== Types ==
=== "Candlestick" lamps or luchnaria ===
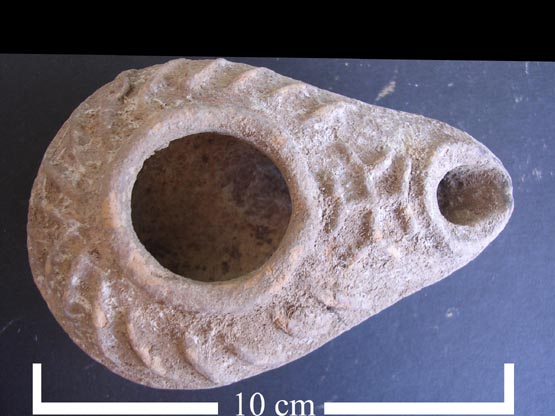
Byzantine period slipper lamp. Found in the village Fandaqomiya (Pentacomia). In this specimen, a cross replaces the palm motif near the origin of the nozzle.

"Candlestick" lamps were named by R. A. Stewart Macalister who identified the palm-branch motif by the nozzle on the specimens he examined as a menorah. The same motif, however, appears on other specimens in conjunction with Greek inscriptions along the sides of the lamp praising Jesus Christ, and on others a cross appears in the place of the palm motif, prompting other scholars to challenge that identification. In recognition of this predominantly Christian iconography, Eugenia Nitowski advocated abandoning the use of "candlestick" to describe these lamps in favour of luchnaria, the plural form of luchnarion, a designation first introduced by Charles Simon Clermont-Ganneau in the 19th century. Nitowski uses "radiated" to describe lamps carrying the "palm-menorah" motif and "inscribed" to indicate those with inscriptions.

These "candlestick" lamps or luchnarion, whose iconography varies and cannot be considered as the sole provenance of any one religious group, have also come to be called slipper lamps in general. They are broadly divided into two main types or categories (basically smaller and larger) that were first delineated by Ovid R. Sellers and Dmitri Baramki in 1953, and then built upon by Renate and Rosenthal, with several variant sub-types as well. These lamps were mass-produced using moulds and constituted the most common form of lamps in the Byzantine and early Islamic period.

The first broad group is associated with the specimens found at 'Ain Yabroud and were produced between the 4th and 6th centuries, and are smaller, devoid of linguistic inscriptions, and characterized by the palm motifs at the end with the nozzle. The second group consists of larger lamps, with more variation in decoration, including Greek and pseudo-Greek inscriptions, and span a longer production period, from the 5th to at least the 8th centuries. They are found all over Palestine (and beyond) and especially abundant in Jerusalem.

Inscribed lamps of this type generally contain the phrase φῶς Χριστοῦ φαίνει πᾶσι ("The Light of Christ Shines for All") in Byzantine Greek. A fragment of a mould for this type of inscribed lamp was found in excavations among the ruins of a Byzantine era church Ein al-Hanniya in 2014. Lamps dated to the 7th and 8th centuries with this inscription carrying Arabic language inscriptions praising God ("Allah") have also been documented. Sylvester J. Saller was the first to recognize that Arabic was being used on the Greek inscribed candlestick lamps in 1961, in an inscription reading, "The light of Christ the Lord shines for the servant of God." He identified what Macalister thought was an illegible Greek letter at the end as the Arabic word الله, "God". Another example from this period carries two Greek inscriptions, with the cruder one hand-etched onto the base being a personalized dedication, reading, "Lord Jesus Christ, remember Alphios, Aianos and Abdela, [his] son, Amen."

A Nabatean version of "candlestick" lamps found at sites like Petra is described as smaller, with a vestigial knob handle, and sides that are almost concave between the wick hole and the filling hole. A heavy concentration of Byzantine era slipper lamps were found around the altar of the excavated Nabatean temple in Khirbet at-Tannur and dated to the 5th century.

Modern scholarship has proposed several theories to account for their widespread use and mass production, including the possibility that they were "souvenirs" for pilgrims or eulogia used in liturgical services. Jodi Magness suggested that they were used in the Holy Fire ceremonies carried out annually (to this day, on the Saturday before Good Sunday) at the Church of the Holy Sepulchre. They may also have been used in more mundane, practical ways, such as by travellers to light the way to pilgrimage sites like at Petra.

St. Jerome (b. 342 – d. 420) mentions that lamps should be lit during gospel readings to dispel both literal and metaphorical darkness. Cyril of Scythopolis (b. 525 – d. 559) described a nighttime procession (Candlemas) which took place at the Kathisma Church, and the upper part of a mould for a large "candlestick" lamp was found in excavations there in 1992. A limestone mould for the lower half of a lamp inscribed with a Christogram was found during excavations in the monastery now inside the Church of St. John the Baptist, Ein Karem.

=== Jerash lamp ===
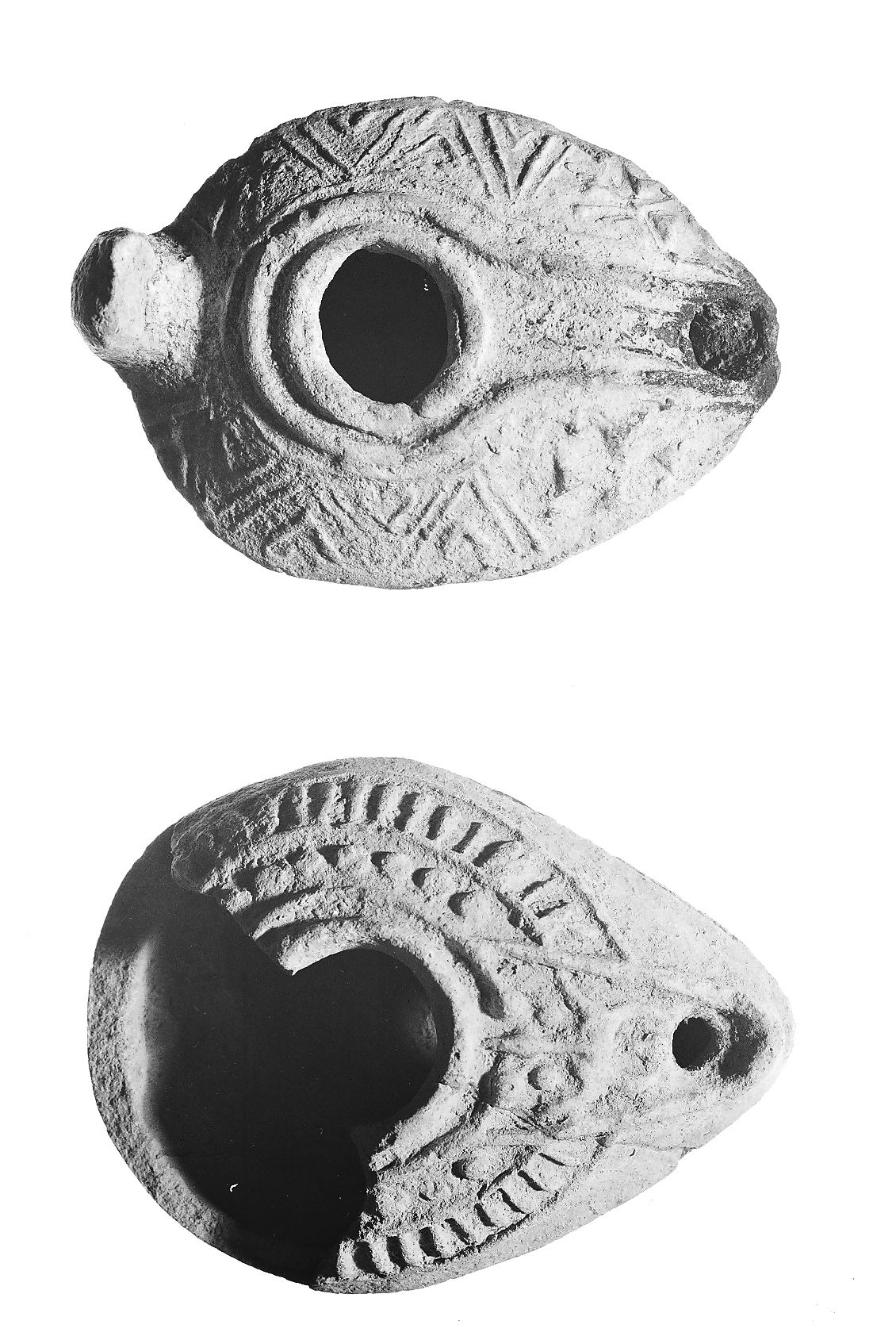
Jerash lamp from the archival photos for Dura-Europos

While Jerash lamps are generally treated as a separate category of oil lamps, due to their own localized production and development, there are Jerash lamps that are mould-made and considered to be slipper lamps as well due to their ovoid form and Christian iconography. These were primarily produced in the Gerasa Hippodrome, a Roman-era theater that was converted into a ceramics workshop in the late Byzantine period to early Islamic period (6th to 8th centuries). A mould for these lamps was also found in Bet Shean, a sister city of Gerasa, who were both part of the Decapolis during Roman rule over Palestine. Another clay mould dating to the Abbasid era was found in excavations of the Church of Bishop Isaiah that likely came from the Gerasa ceramics workshop.

There are several lamps with bilingual Greek and Arabic inscriptions (in Kufic script) of this type found in Jordan, with "The light of Christ is the resurrection" coexisting with "In the name of God, the Merciful, the Compassionate." These lamps attest to the intermixing between Christian and Islamic traditions in the region following the Islamic conquest and were produced by both Christian and Muslim lampmakers serving a mixed clientele, some of whom may have newly embraced Islam. This period was also when the polis of Gerasa shifted administratively to become the Arab madina of Jerash, though Arabic only later became the official language in the 8th–9th centuries.

=== Early Islamic mould-made lamps ===
These lamps date between the 7th and 9th centuries and were made all throughout Syria, Jordan and Palestine, and while they are sometimes not considered slipper lamps, they are mould-made and share the same ovoid shape of their predecessors and clearly build upon the same tradition. Unique aspects are the pronounced tongue-shaped handles, channel-like grooves between the filling and wick holes, greater flowery ornamentation and Arabic inscriptions. After the 9th century, oil lamps in Palestine ceased being made in moulds (for a few centuries) and returned to being produced in potters' workshops on the wheel in a saucer-like shape.

New lamp production sites emerged in this period at Khirbet al-Mafjar in Jericho and in Ramla, the new regional capital of Jund Filastin. Most of the established lamp workshops from the previous period continued production, with the exception of those disrupted by the earthquake of 749. Designs and inscriptions became less overtly religious, with only a few mentions of Allah/God in Arabic. Bilingual (Greek and Arabic) inscriptions of a more generic nature predominate, focusing on praising the beauty and magnificence of light and the lamps themselves.

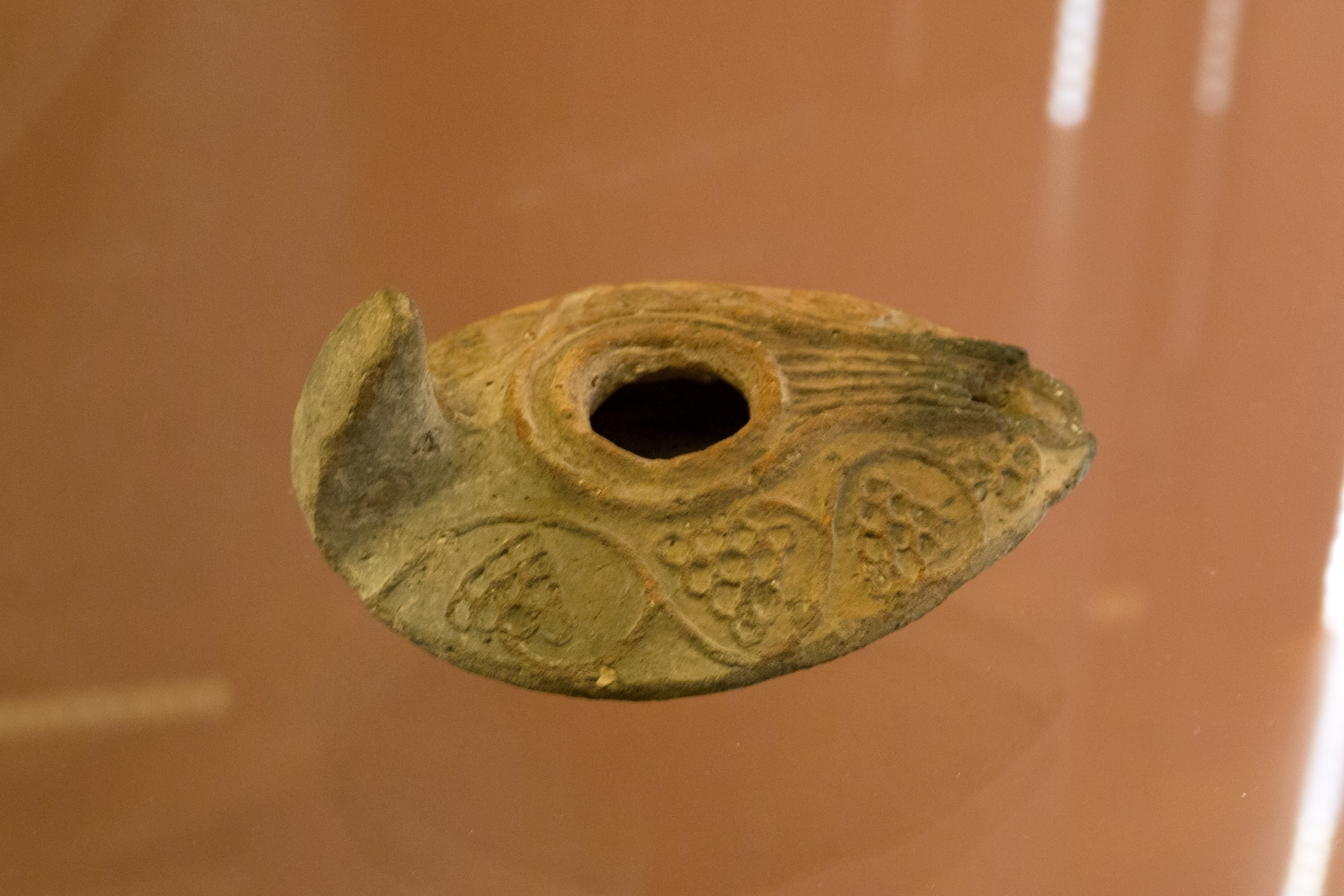
Oil lamp dated to 7th-8th centuries with tongue handle, channel grooves and decorative motifs

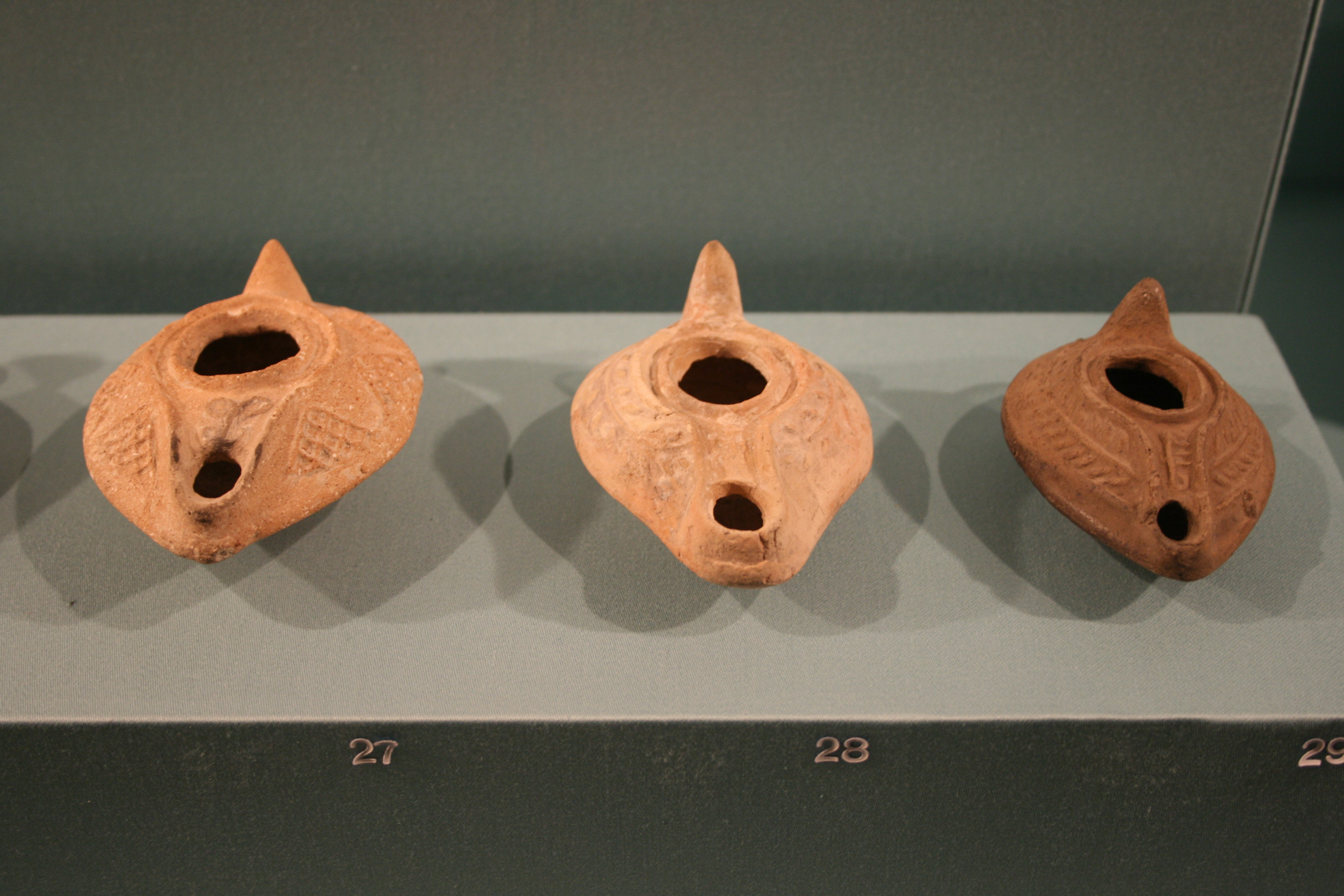
Three examples of Islamic mould-made lamps, 7th–8th century

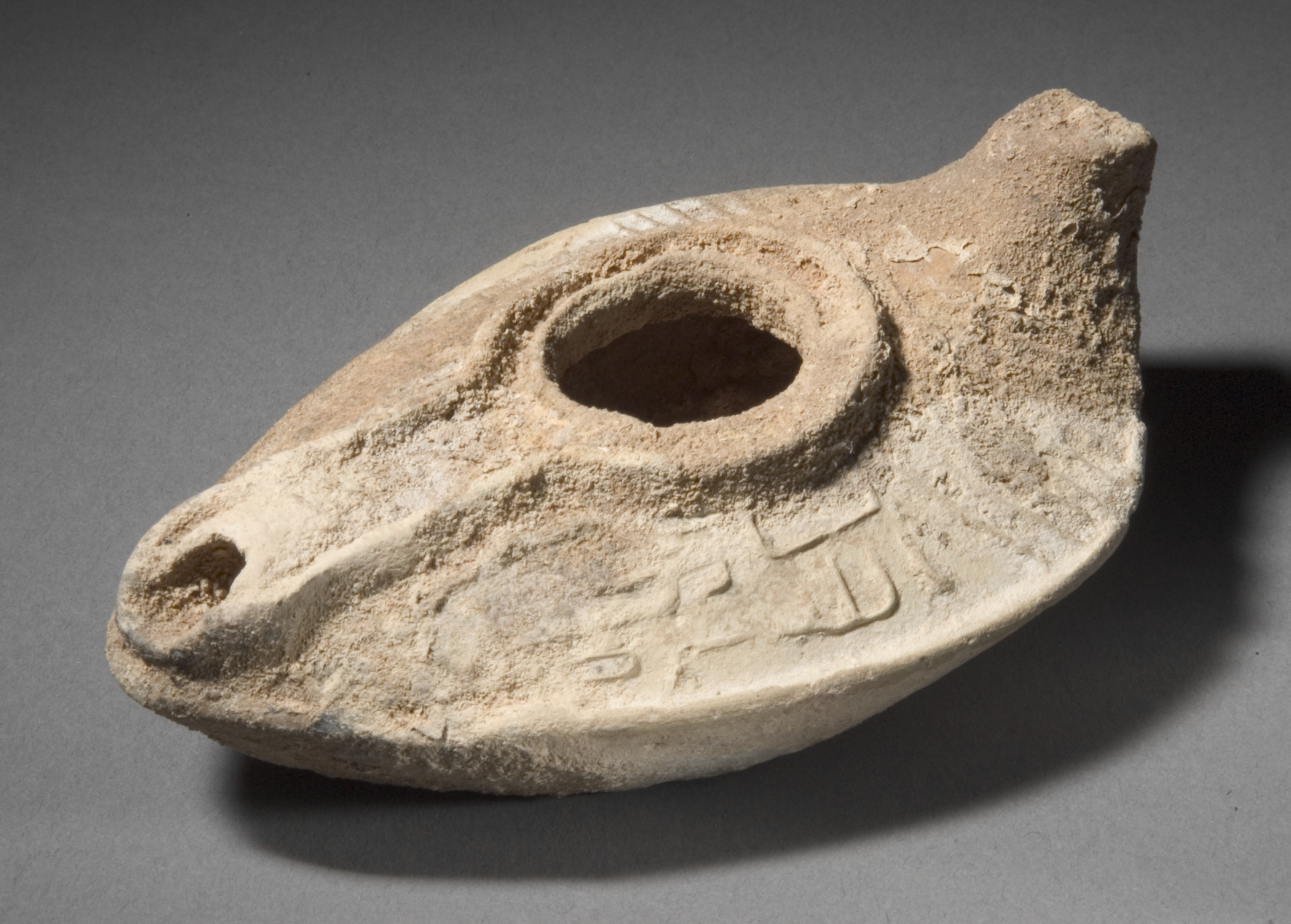
Mould-made oil lamp from Greater Syria, dated to the 8th century

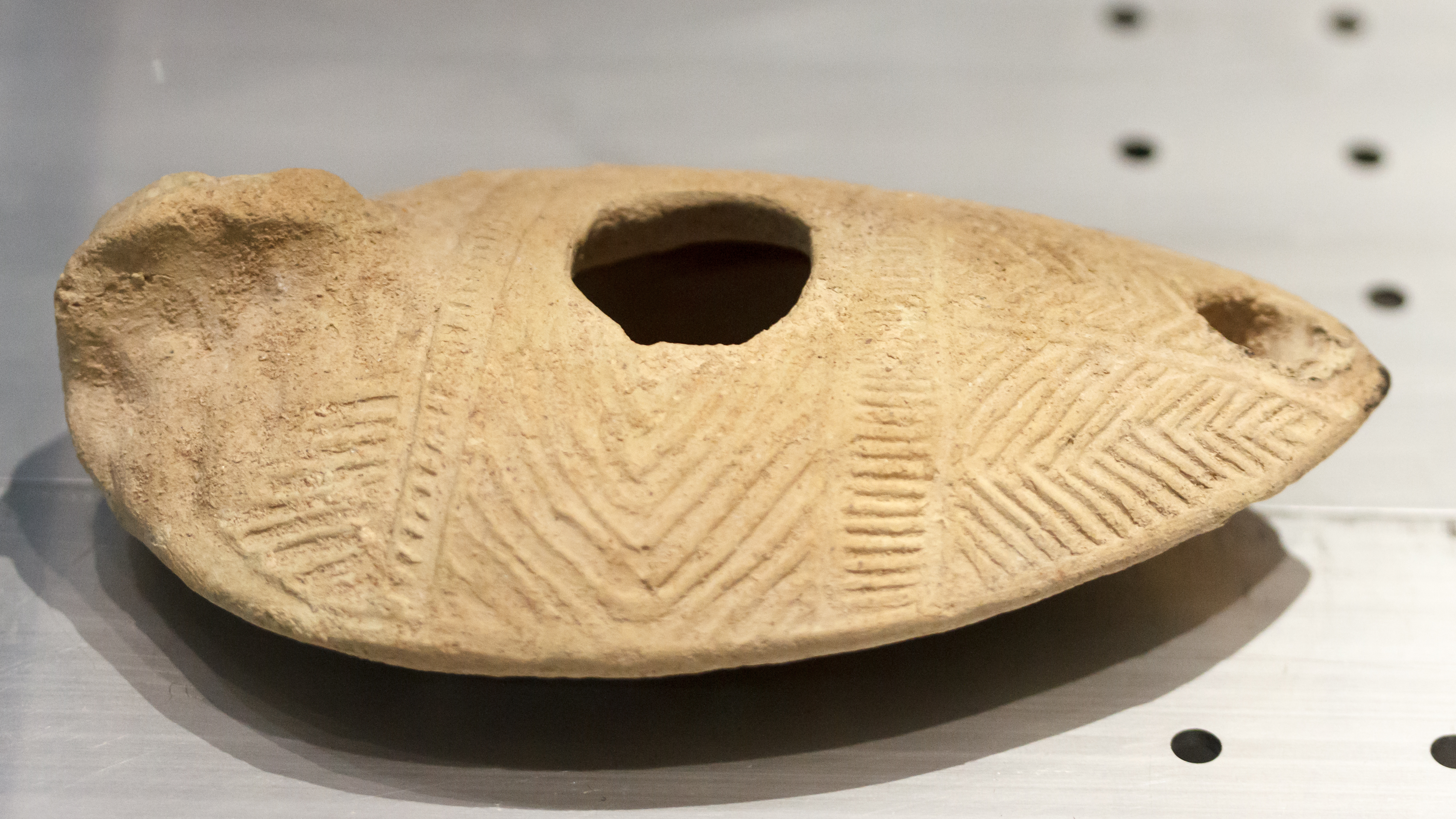
A 13th- or 14th-century lamp in the shape of a slipper discovered at Tell Umm el-'Amr, Gaza

=== Late Islamic slipper lamps ===
Slipper lamps reappear in large-scale production and widespread distribution throughout the Levant and Egypt between the 13th and 15th centuries. These are also almond-shaped (or ovoid), with two possible types of bases, one curved like the earlier "candlestick" types, the other flat. Decoration is various and not confined to any one religious or ethnic grouping, though some lamps do carry crosses. Inscriptions when they appear are in Arabic using a Naskh script and make general references to the Creator, the Holy Spirit (Arabic: روح القدس, romanized: rūḥ al-quddus) and Jesus, while emphasizing the lamp's propensity to bring luck and happiness. A workshop in which Mamluk era lamps were made was identified in Nabi Samwil in the Jerusalem area.

== Bibliography ==
- Barrett, Deirdre Grace (2008). The Ceramic Oil Lamp as an Indicator of Cultural Change within Nabataean Society in Petra and its Environs circa CE 106. Gorgias Press.
- Brillowski, Wojciech; Wakowicz, Dorota (2018). Ancient Lamps in the Jesuit Museum in the Sanctuary of Holy Mother of Christian Unity at Święta Lipka.
- de Vincenz, Anna (2020). "Ceramic Vessels and Oil Lamps from the Burial Cave at 'En Lavan, Naḥal Refa'im". 'Atiqot. 98, Article 6: 103–122).
- Di Segni, Leah; Storchan, Benyamin; Weksler-Bdolah, Shlomit (2023). "A Greek Inscribed Early Islamic-Period Oil Lamp from Jerusalem". 'Atiqot. 110, Article 15.
- Holmqvist-Sepilä (2016). "Ceramic lamps at Jabal Harûn: Typo-chronology and chemical composition (ED-XRF)". In Fiema, Z.T., Frösén, J. & Holappa M. (ed.). Petra: The Mountain of Aaron II: The Nabataean sanctuary and the Byzantine monastery.
- Ioannis Motsianos, Karen S. Garnett, ed. (2019). Glass, Wax and Metal: Lighting Technologies in Late Antique, Byzantine and Medieval Times. Archaeopress Publishing Limited. ISBN 978-1-78969-217-4.
- Levantine Ceramics Project. "Ware/Ware Family/Style: Late Byzantine Jerash lamps". American Society of Overseas Research.
- Lichtenberger, Achim; Raja, Rubina (2021). Glass, Lamps, and Jerash Bowls Final Publications from the Danish-German Jerash Northwest Quarter Project III. Brepols Publishers.
- Magness, Jodi. "Illuminating Byzantine Jerusalem". Biblical Archaeology Society (March/April 1998).
- Milwright, Marcus. "Pottery of the Islamic Period on the Karak Plateau". Karak Resources Project.
- Nitowski, Eugenia L. (1974). "Inscribed and Radiated-Type Byzantine Lamps". Andrews University Seminary Studies. 12 (1).
- The Luchnaria: Inscribed Lamps of the Byzantine Period (PDF). The Siegfried H. Horn Archaeological Museum. 1986.
- Petersen, Brian N. (2023). "The Lamps of Khirbet el Mafjar" (PDF). Bible and Spade. 25 (4).
- Rosenthal, Renate; Sivan, Renee (1978). "Ancient Lamps in the Schloessinger Collection". Qedem. 8: 3–179. JSTOR 43588148.
- Storchan, Benyamin (2021). "The Role of Churches in Byzantine-Early Islamic Period Lamp Production in the Holy Land". Revue Biblique. 128 (2): 251–270.
- Sussman, Varda (2017). Late Roman to Late Byzantine/Early Islamic Period Lamps in the Holy Land: The Collection of the Israel Antiquities Authority (PDF). Archaeopress Publishing Ltd.
- Sussman, Varda (2025). Oil Lamps in the Holy Land During the Early and Later Islamic Periods (7th–16th/17th CE):The Collection of the Israel Antiquities Authority. Archaeopress Publishing. ISBN 978-1-80327-912-1.
