= Medina Mosque =

Medina Mosque or Madina Mosque may refer to:

- Prophet's Mosque in Medina, Saudi Arabia
- Madina Mosque (Accra), Ghana
- Madina Mosque (Barbados)
- Madina Mosque (Bengal), in the Nizamat Fort Campus in Murshidabad, West Bengal, India
- Madina Mosque (Preston), England
- Medina Mosque (Sheffield), England
- Madina Mosque, Shillong, Meghalaya, India
- Madina Mosque (Ufa), a mosque in Russia

== See also ==
- Madina (disambiguation)
