= Abbas Musliyar =

Indian Sunni Muslim religious leader

Abbas Musliyar, also known as Sharaful Ulama Manjanady Ustad, was the founder of Al Madeena Islamic complex, Mangalore. He was one of the Sunni Muslim leaders of Karnataka and North Kerala. He was the Member of Samastha Kerala Jamiyathul Ulama Central Mushawara AP Faction and Main leader of Karnataka Jamiyathul Ulama AP Samastha Faction. He was born in Madikeri, India. Musliyar died on 28 July 2019 after a brief illness. He Has a Lot of Students including EK Faction Samastha Kerala Mushawara Member Abdullah Faizy Kodagu.

== See also ==
- Al Madeena Islamic complex
