= Medina (given name) =

Medina is a unisex given name. Notable people with the name include:

- Medina (singer), Danish singer born Andrea Fuentealba Valbak (born 1982)
- Medina Dixon (1962–2021), American basketball player
- Medina Eisa (born 2002), Ethiopian track and field athlete
- Medina Warda Aulia (born 1997), Indonesian chess player
- Medina (actress) (born 1987), Indonesian actress and presenter

== See also ==
- Médine (disambiguation)
