= Oil lamp =

Lamp used for lighting by burning oil

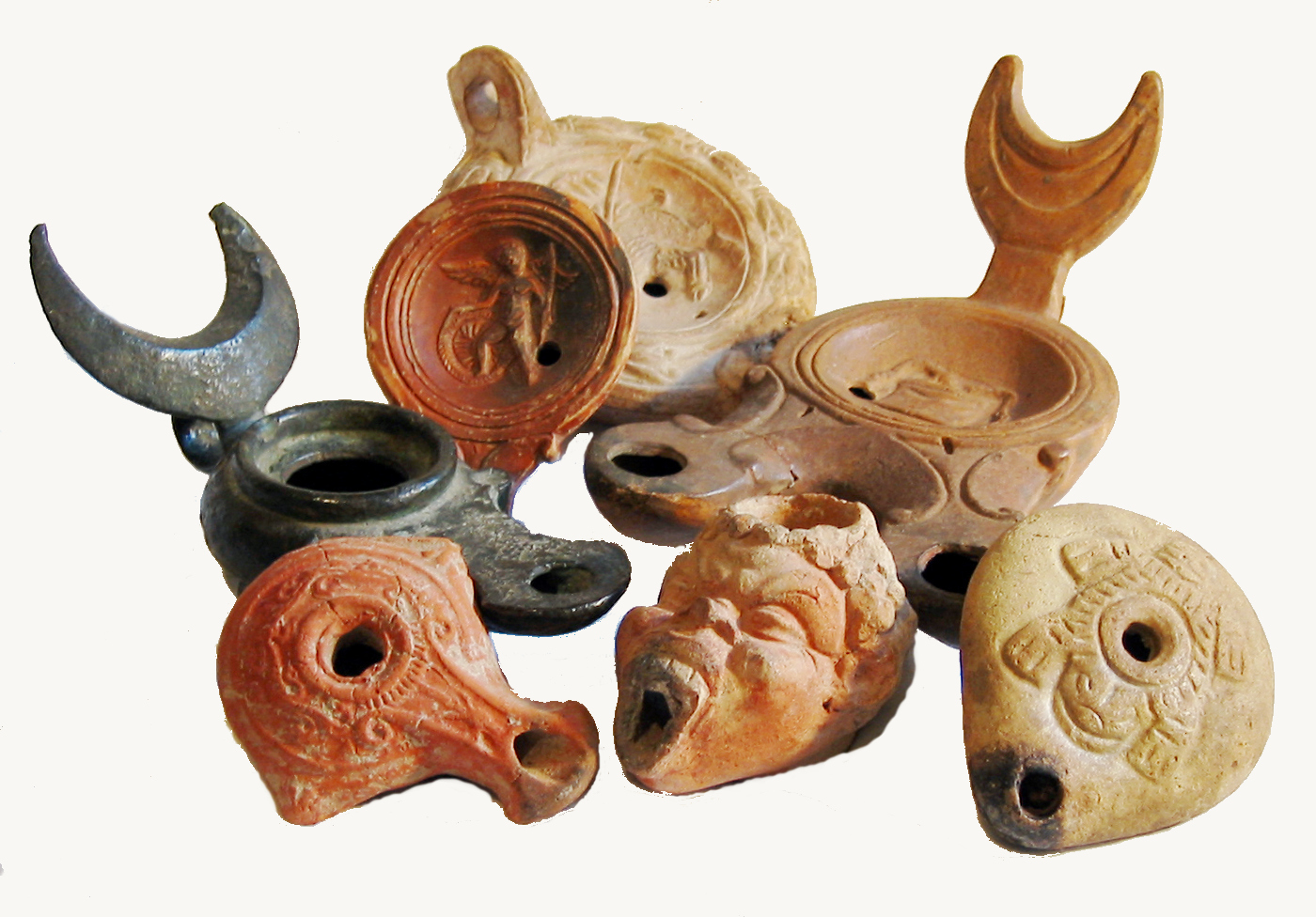
Group of ancient lamps (Hellenistic and Roman)

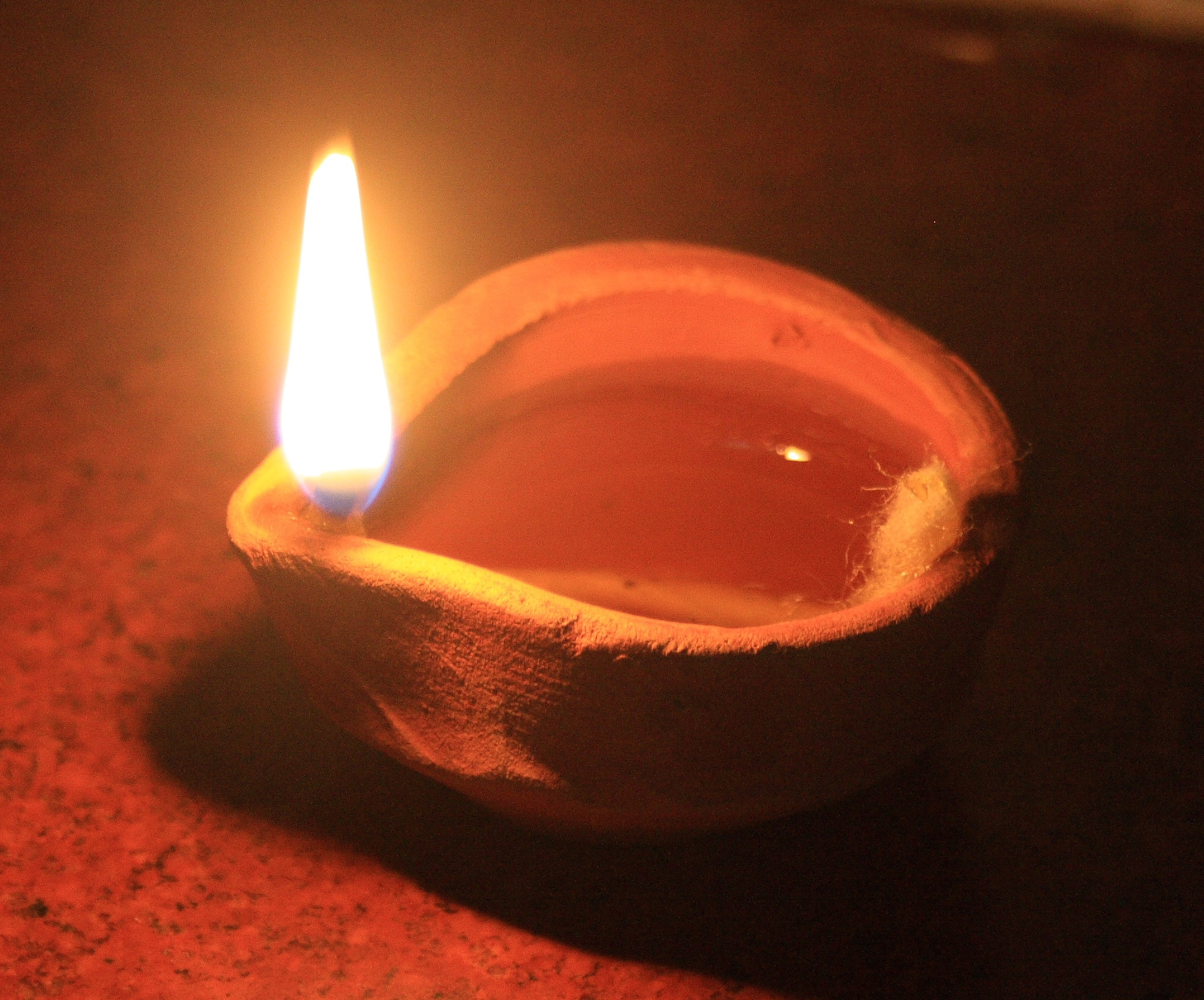
Simple contemporary Indian clay oil lamp during Diwali

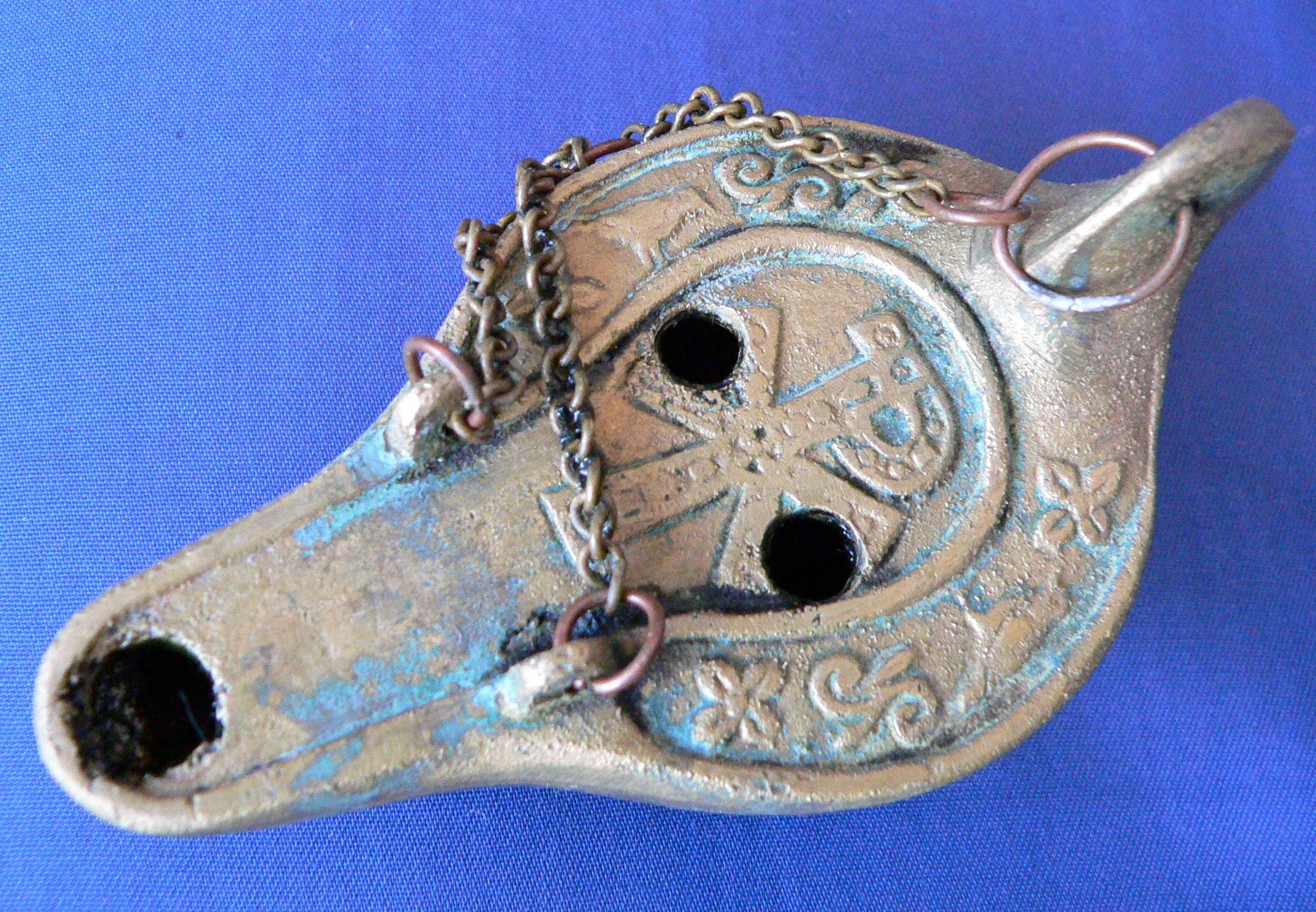
Antique bronze oil lamp with the "Chi Rho", a Christian symbol (replica)

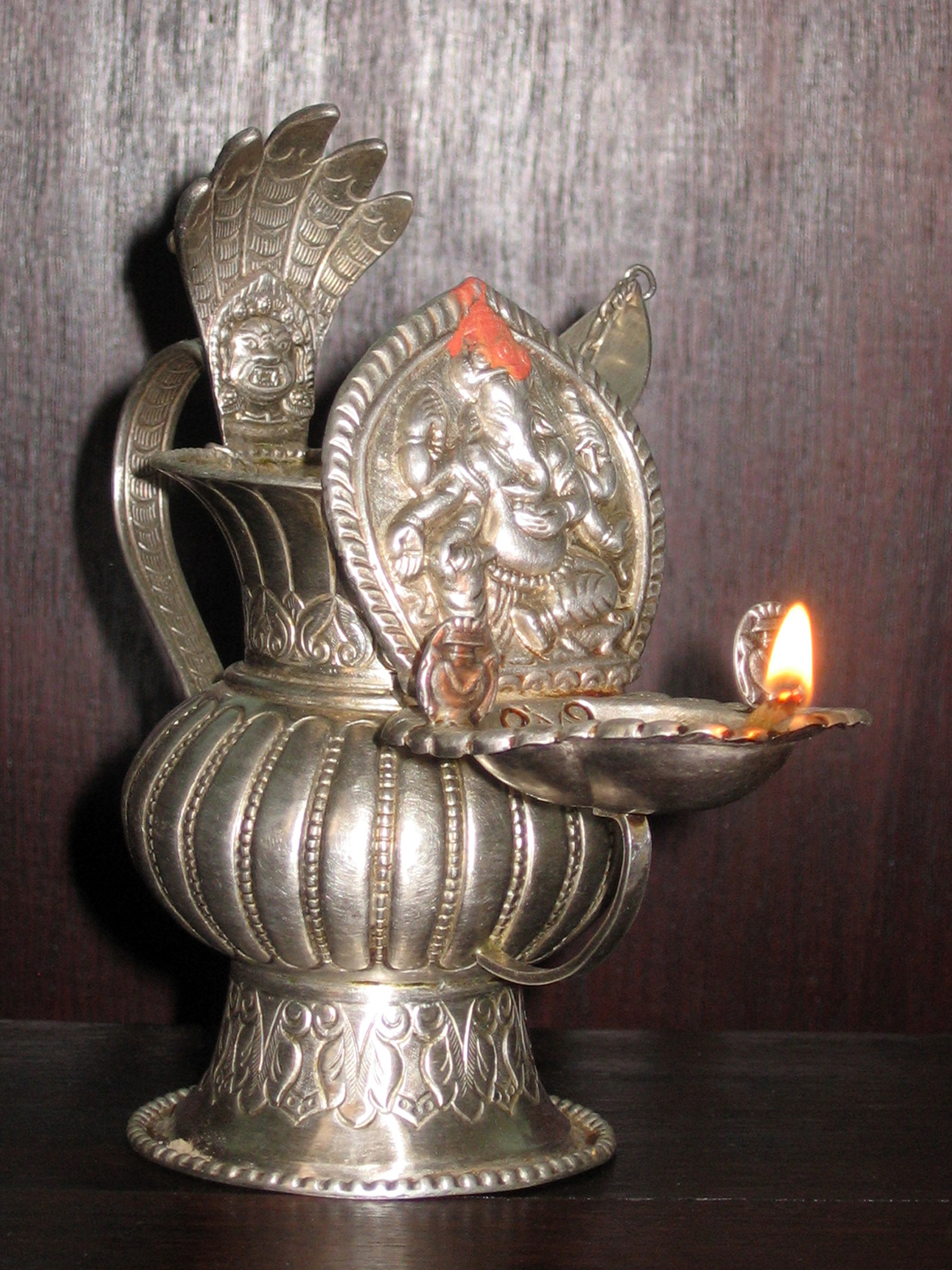
Sukunda oil lamp of Kathmandu Valley, Nepal

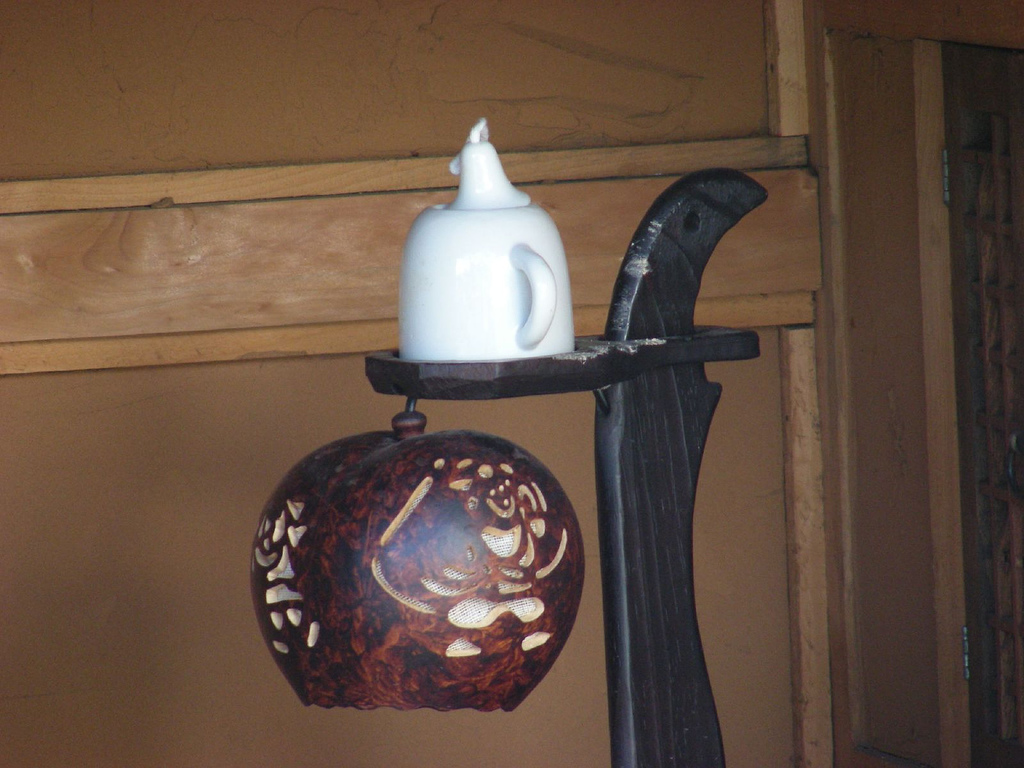
Oil lamp of Korea

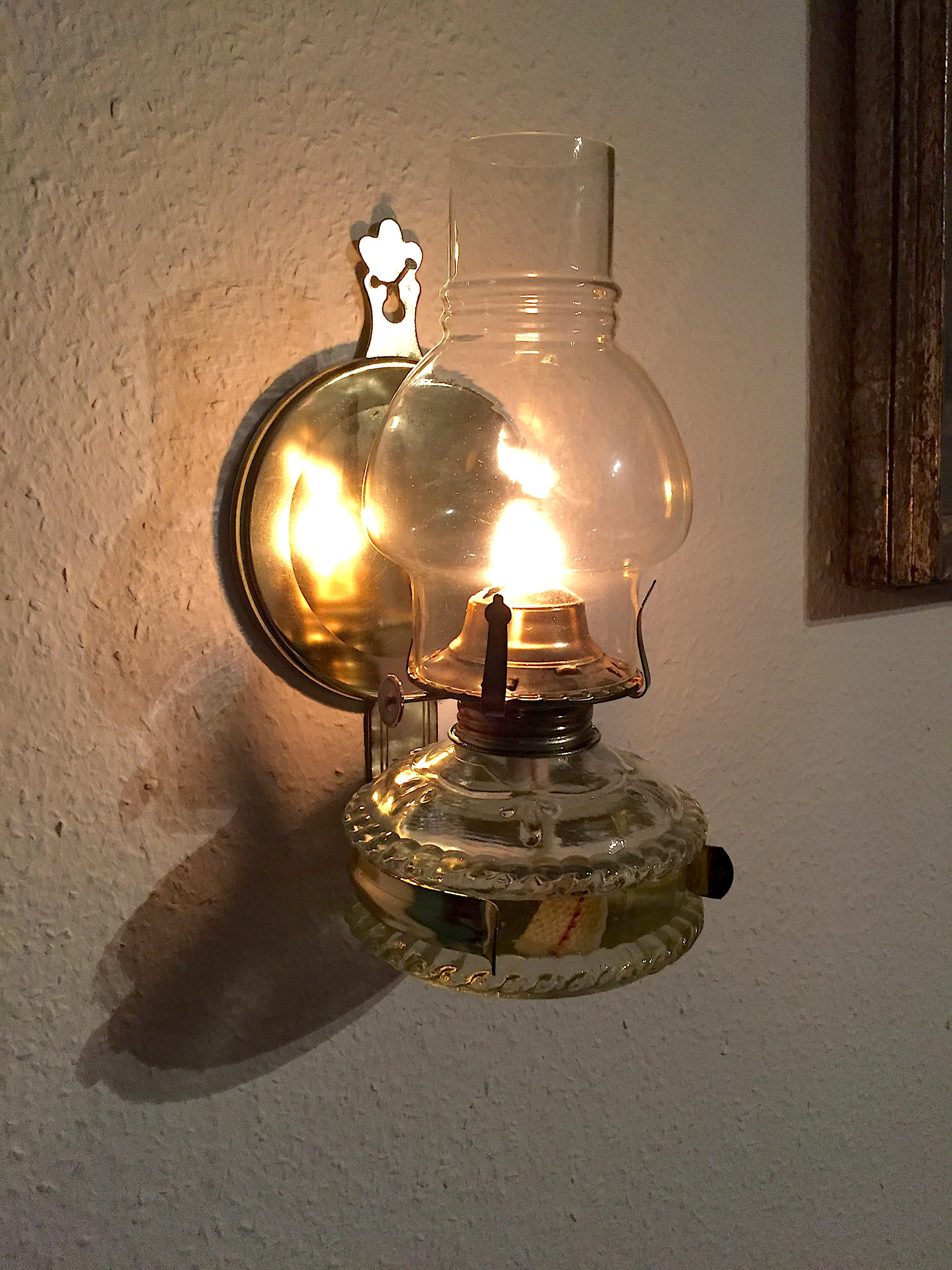
Modern oil lamp of Germany with flat wick

An oil lamp is a lamp used to produce light continuously for a period of time using an oil-based fuel source. The use of oil lamps began thousands of years ago and continues to this day, although their use is less common in modern times. They work in the same way as a candle but with fuel that is liquid at room temperature, so that a container for the oil is required. A textile wick drops down into the oil, and is lit at the end, burning the oil as it is drawn up the wick.

Oil lamps are a form of lighting, and were used as an alternative to candles before the use of electric lights. Starting in 1780, the Argand lamp quickly replaced other oil lamps still in their basic ancient form. These in turn were replaced by the kerosene lamp in about 1850. In small towns and rural areas the latter continued in use well into the 20th century, until such areas were finally electrified and light bulbs could be used.

Sources of fuel for oil lamps include a wide variety of plants such as nuts (walnuts, almonds and kukui), seeds (sesame, castor, or flax) and fruit (olive). Also widely used were animal fats (butter, ghee, fish oil, shark liver, whale oil, or seal oil). Camphine, made of purified spirits of turpentine, and burning fluid, a mixture of turpentine and alcohol, were sold as lamp fuels starting in the 1830s as the whale oil industry declined. Sales of both camphene and burning fluid decreased in the late 1800s as other sources of lighting, such as kerosene made from petroleum, gas lighting and electric lighting, began to predominate.

Most modern lamps (such as fueled lanterns) have been replaced by gas-based or petroleum-based fuels to operate when emergency non-electric light is required. Oil lamps are currently used primarily for their ambience.

== Components ==
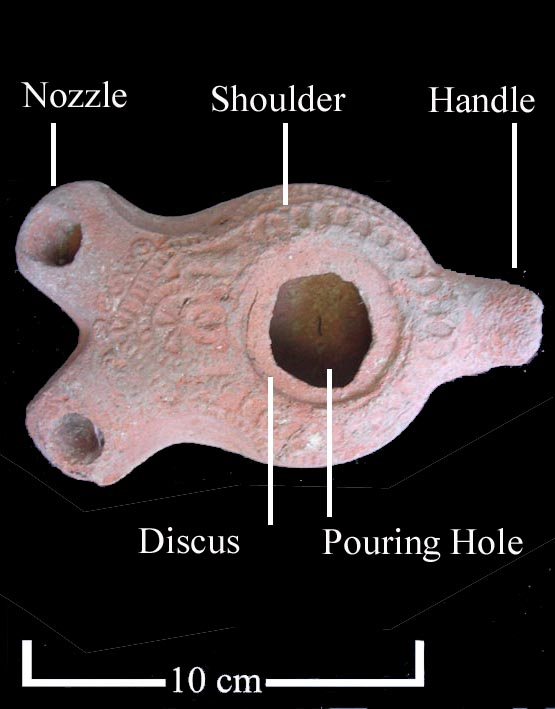
Double-nozzled terracotta oil lamp found in Samaria

The following are the main external parts of a terra-cotta lamp:

Shoulder
Pouring hole
The hole through which fuel is put inside the fuel chamber. The width generally ranges from 0.5–5 cm (0.2–2.0 in). There may be one hole or multiple holes.
Wick hole and the nozzle
May be either an opening in the body of the lamp or an elongated nozzle. In some specific types of lamps, there is a groove on the top of the nozzle that runs along to the pouring hole to re-collect the oozing oil from the wick.
Handle
Lamps can come with a handle. The handle can come in different shapes. The most common is a ring-shaped for the forefinger surmounted by a palmette, on which the thumb is pressed to stabilize the lamp. Other handles can be crescent-shaped, triangular, or oval-shaped. The handleless lamps usually have an elongated nozzle, and sometimes have a lug rising diagonally from the periphery. The lug may act as a small handle where the thumb rests. Some lugs are pierced. It was speculated that pierced lugs were used to place a pen or straw, called the Latin: acus or festuca, with which the wick was trimmed. Others think that the pierced lugs were used to hang the lamp on a metal hook when not in use.
Discus
Fuel chamber
The fuel reservoir. The mean volume in a typical terra-cotta lamp is 20 cc (20 mL).

== Types ==
Lamps can be categorized based on different criteria, including material (clay, silver, bronze, gold, stone, slip), shape, structure, design, and imagery (e.g. symbolic, religious, mythological, erotic, battles, hunting).

Typologically, lamps of the Ancient Mediterranean can be divided into seven major categories:

Wheel-made
This category includes Greek and Egyptian lamps that date before the 3rd century BC. They are characterized by simplicity, with little or no decoration, a wide pour-hole, a lack of handles, and a pierced or unpierced lug. Pierced lugs occurred briefly between the 4th and 3rd century BC. Unpierced lugs continued until the 1st century BC.

Volute, Early Imperial
With spiral, scroll-like ornaments called volutes extending from their nozzles, these lamps were predominantly produced in Italy during the Early Roman period. They have a wide discus, a narrow shoulder, no handle, elaborate imagery and artistic finishing, and a wide range of patterns of decoration.

High Imperial
These lamps are late Roman. The shoulder is wider and the discus is smaller with fewer decorations. These lamps have handles, short, plain nozzles, and less artistic finishing.

Frog
This is a regional style lamp exclusively produced in Egypt and found in the regions around it, between c. 100 and 300 AD. The frog (Heqet) is an Egyptian fertility symbol.

African Red Slip
Lamps made in North Africa, but widely exported, decorated in a red slip. They date from the 2nd to the 7th century AD and comprise a wide variety of shapes including a flat, heavily decorated shoulder with a small and relatively shallow discus. Their decoration is either non-religious, Christian or Jewish. Grooves run from the nozzle back to the pouring hole. It is hypothesized that this is to take back spilled oil. These lamps often have more than one pour-hole.

Slipper
These lamps are oval-shaped and found mainly in the Levant. They were produced between the 3rd to 9th centuries AD. Decorations include vine scrolls, palm wreaths, and Greek letters.

Factory lamps
Also called German: Firmalampen, these are universal in distribution and simple in appearance. They have a channeled nozzle, plain discus, and two or three bumps on the shoulder. Initially made in factories in Northern Italy and Southern Gaul between the 1st and 3rd centuries AD, they were exported to all Roman provinces. The vast majority were stamped on the bottom to identify the manufacturer.

== In religious contexts ==
=== Judaism ===
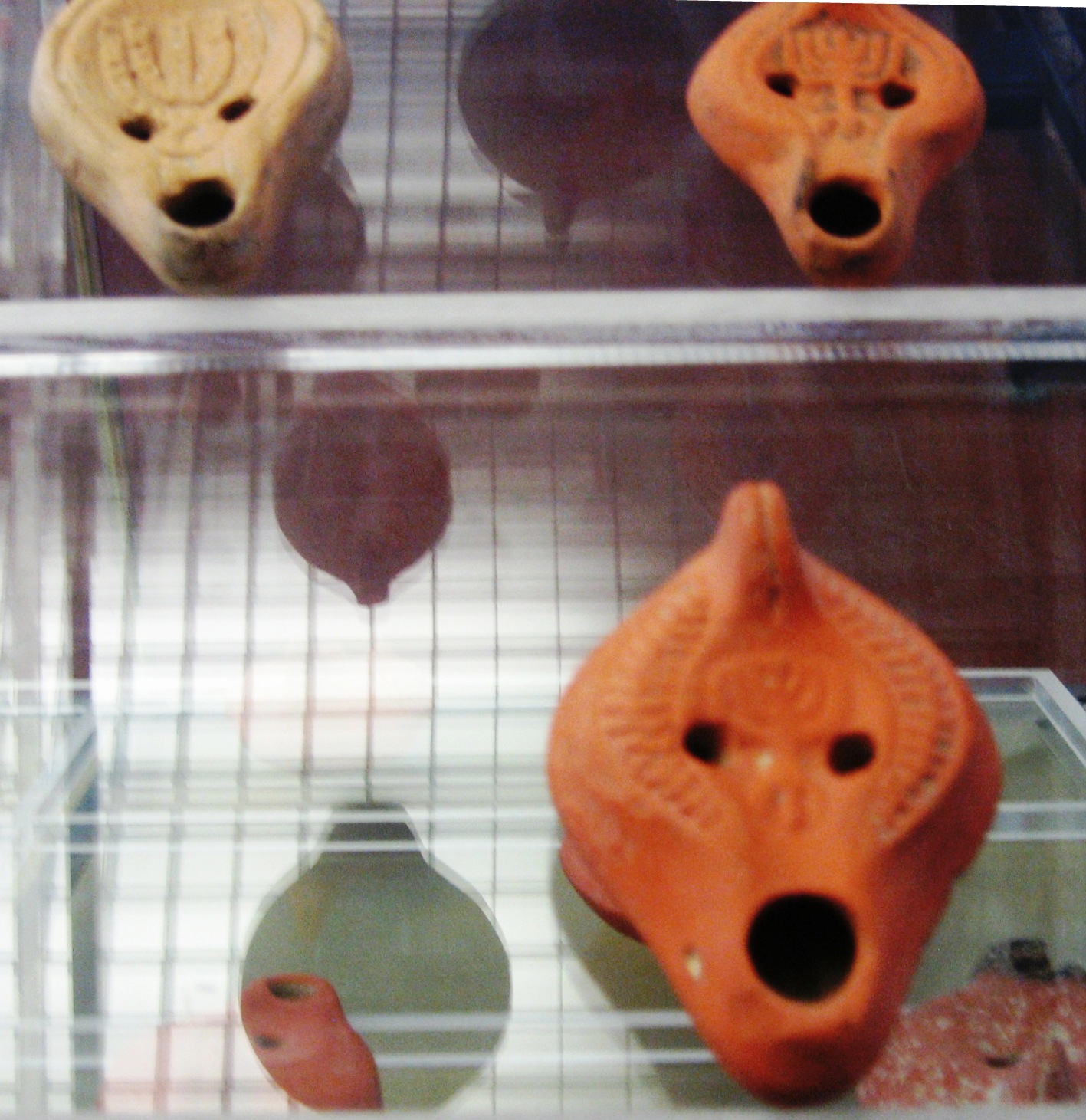
Jewish terracotta oil lamps from Sardinia in the Museo Nazionale Sanna, Sassari

Lamps appear in the Torah and other Jewish sources as a symbol of "lighting" the way for the righteous, the wise, and for love and other positive values. While fire was often described as being destructive, light was given a positive spiritual meaning. The oil lamp and its light were important household items, and this may explain their symbolism. Oil lamps were used for many spiritual rituals. The oil lamp and its light also became important ritualistic articles with the further development of Jewish culture and religion. The Temple Menorah, a ritual seven-branched oil lamp used in the Second Temple, forms the centre of the Chanukah story.

=== Christianity ===
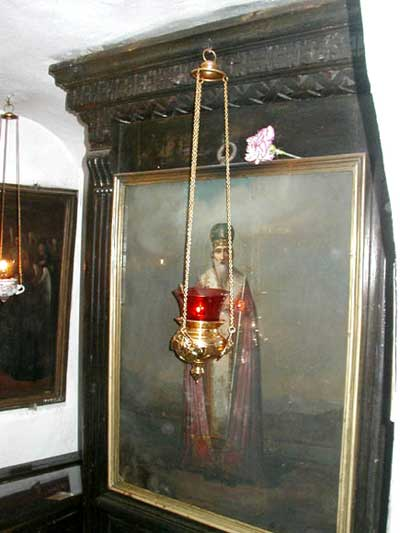
Oil lamp burning before the icon of St. Mercurius of Smolensk, Kyiv Pechersk Lavra, Ukraine

There are several references to oil lamps in the New Testament. In the Eastern Orthodox Church, Roman Catholic Church, and Eastern Catholic Churches oil lamps (Greek: kandili, Church Slavonic: lampada) are still used both on the Holy Table (altar) and to illuminate icons on the iconostasis and around the temple (church building). Orthodox Christians will also use oil lamps in their homes to illuminate their icon corner. Traditionally, the sanctuary lamp in an Orthodox church is an oil lamp. It is lit by the bishop when the church is consecrated, and ideally it should burn perpetually thereafter. The oil burned in all of these lamps is traditionally olive oil. Oil lamps are also referenced as a symbol throughout the New Testament, including in the Parable of the Ten Virgins.

=== Islam ===
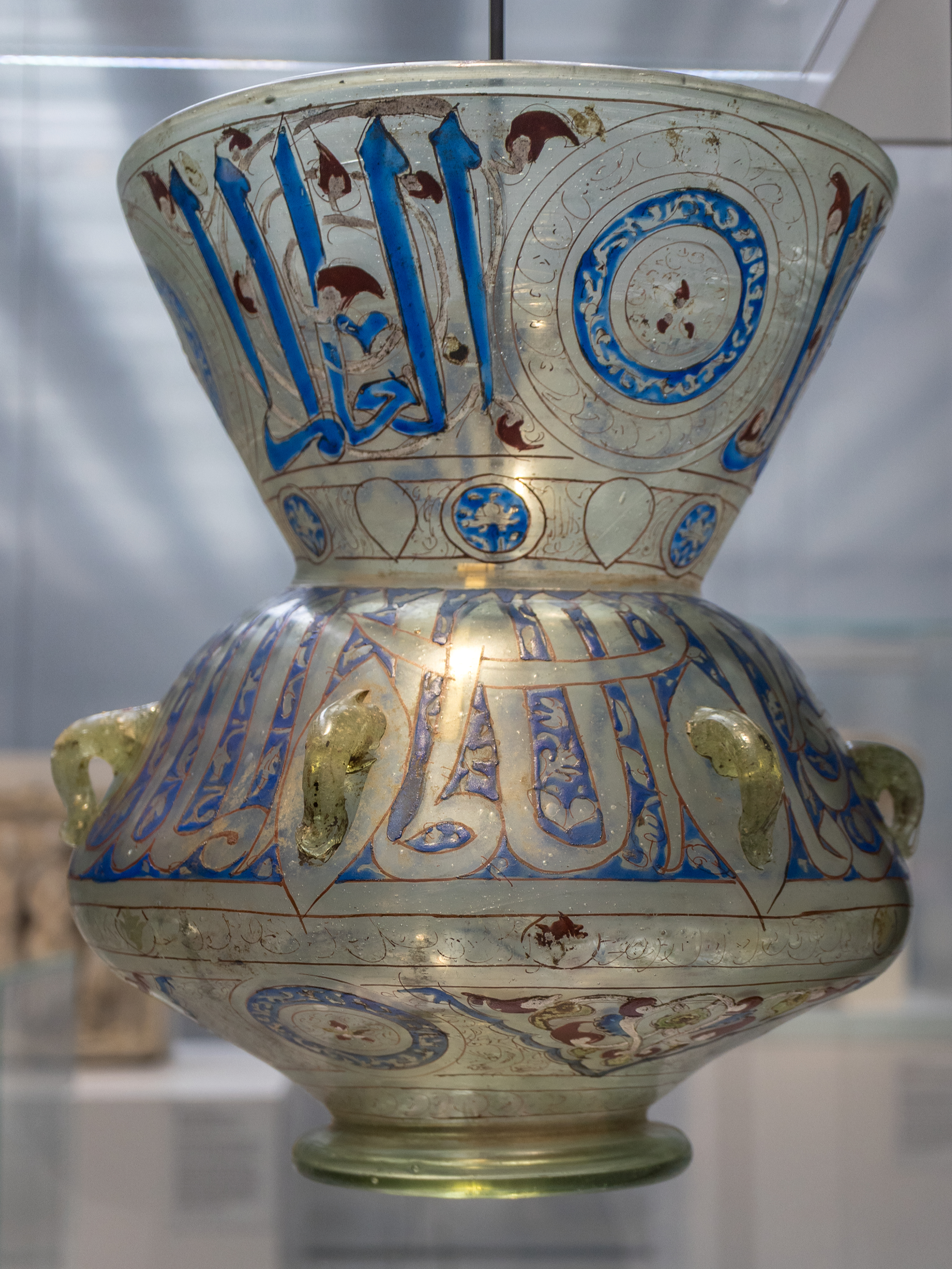
Hanging oil lamp (Syria or Egypt, second half of the 14th century), Louvre Museum

The Quran mentions "lanterns" (or lamps) in two key verses: Surah An-Nur (24:35), the famous "Verse of Light," which uses the parable of a lamp in a niche to describe Allah's divine light, and Surah Al-Mulk (67:5), which describes stars in the lower heaven as lamps (masabih) used as missiles against devils, as cited in these Quran.com and Quran.com results.

=== Hinduism ===
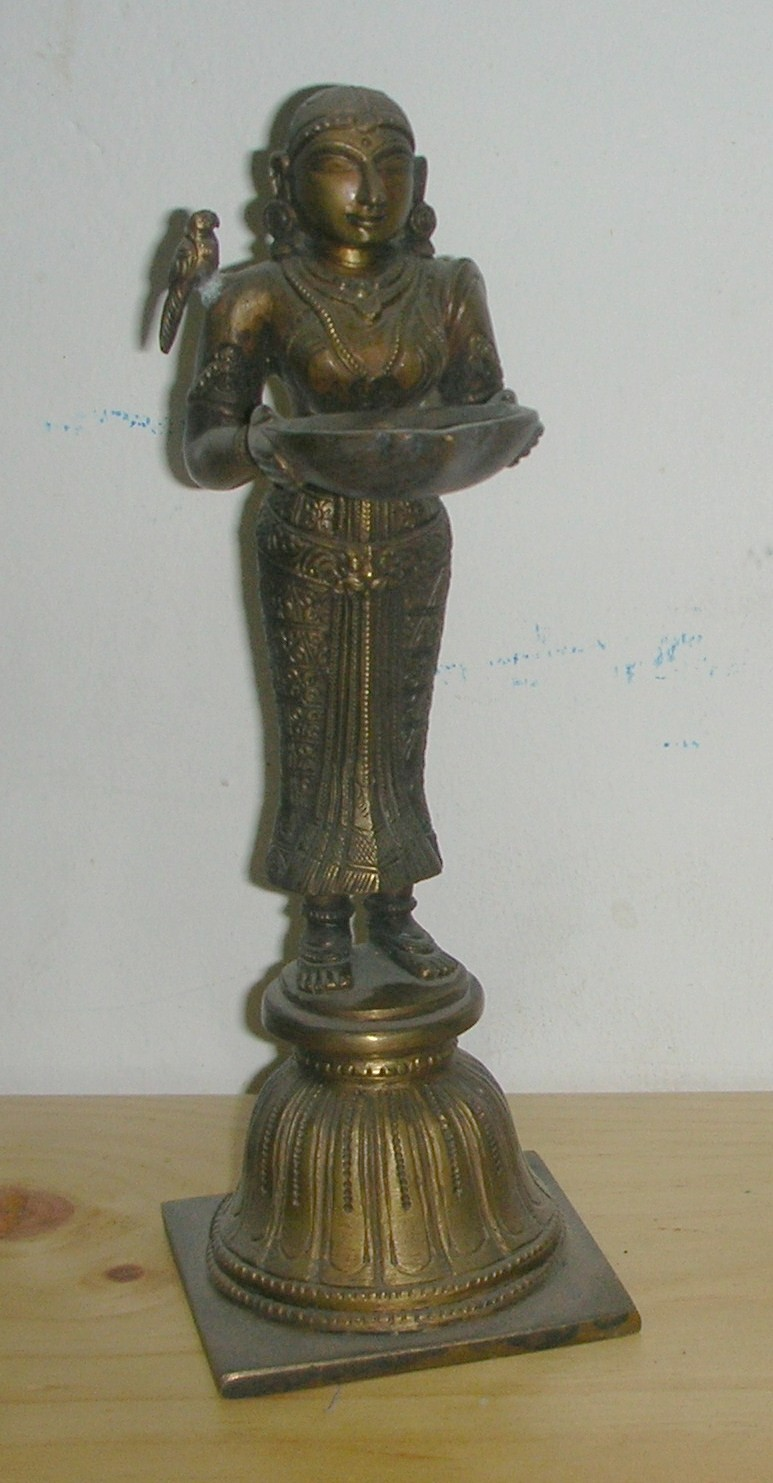
Paavai vilakku: brass oil lamp from Tamil Nadu in the image of Andal

Oil lamps are commonly used in Hindu temples as well as in home shrines. Generally the lamps used in temples are circular with places for five wicks. They are made of metal and either suspended on a chain or screwed onto a pedestal. There will usually be at least one lamp in each shrine, and the main shrine may contain several. Usually only one wick is lit, with all five burning only on festive occasions. The oil lamp is used in the Hindu ritual of Aarti.

In the home shrine, the style of lamp is usually different, containing only one wick. There is usually a piece of metal that forms the back of the lamp, which has a picture of a Hindu deity embossed on it. In many houses, the lamp burns all day, but in other homes, it is lit at sundown. The lamp in the home shrine is supposed to be lit before any other lights are turned on at night to attract prosperity and divine blessings.

A hand-held oil lamp or incense sticks (lit from the lamp) are also used during the Hindu puja ceremony. In the North of India, a five-wick lamp is used, usually fueled with ghee. On special occasions, various other lamps may be used for puja, the most elaborate having several tiers of wicks.

In South India, there are a few types of oil lamps that are common in temples and traditional rituals. Some of the smaller ones are used for offerings as well to bring stability, abundance, and good health to the family.

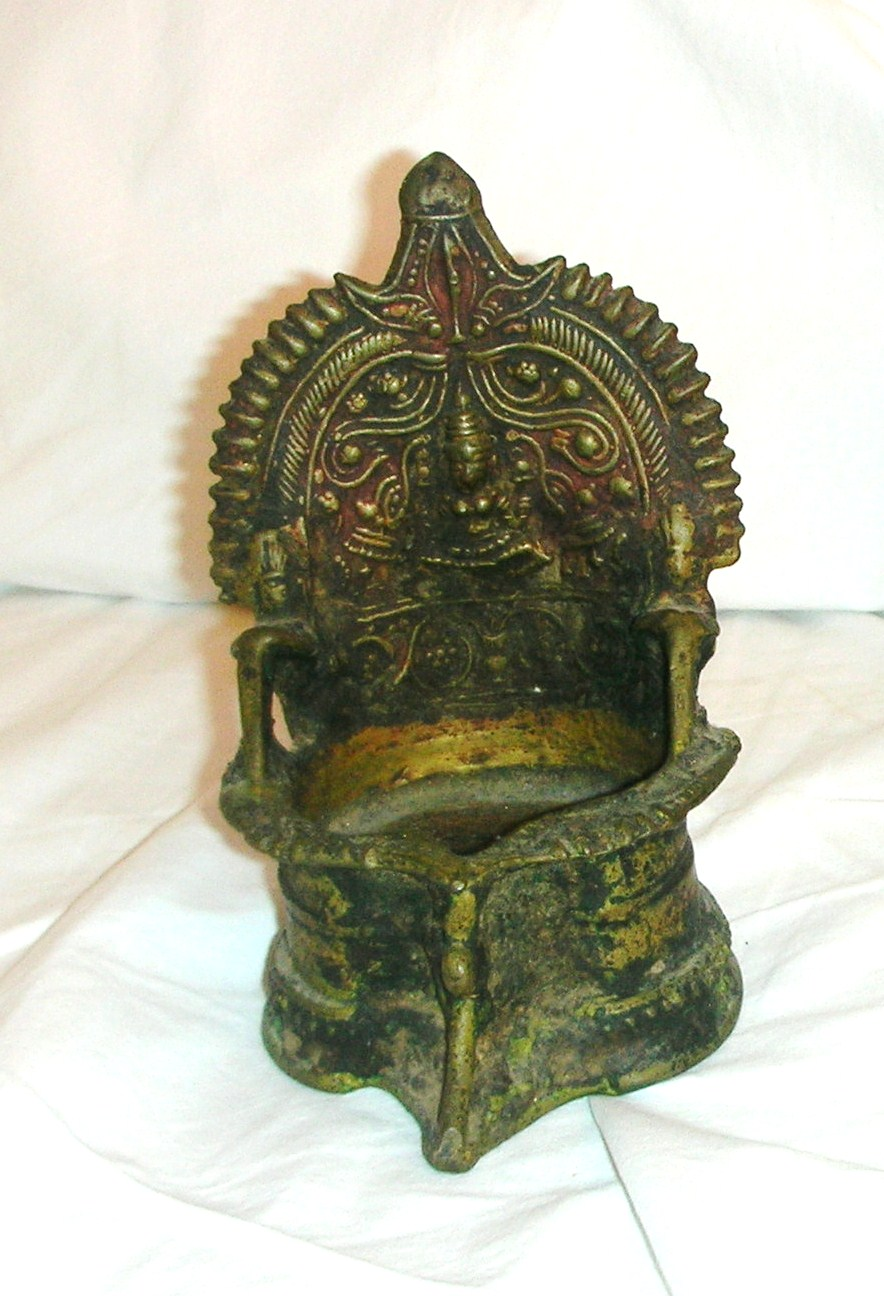
A Deepalakshmi oil lamp from Kumbakonam

Deepalakshmi
A brass lamp with a depiction of goddess Sri Lakshmi over the back piece. They are usually small and have only one wick.
Nilavilakku
A tall brass or bronze lamp on a stand where the wicks are placed at a certain height.
Paavai vilakku
A brass or bronze lamp in the form of a lady holding a vessel with her hands. This type of lamp comes in different sizes, from very small to almost life-size. There are also large stone versions of this lamp in Hindu temples and shrines of Karnataka, Tamil Nadu and Kerala, especially at the base of columns and flanking the entrance of temples. They have only one wick.
Thooku vilakku
A brass or bronze lamp hanging from a chain, often with multiple wicks.
Nachiarkoil lamp
An ornamental brass lamp made of series of diyas, a handicraft product which is exclusively made by the Pather (Kammalar) community in Nachiyar Koil, Tamil Nadu, India.

When the Big Temple in Thanjavur, Tamil Nadu, was built 1010 AD, there were elaborate measures taken to provide lighting for the temple. Lands were donated to or conquered for the temple for this sole objective. The income from these lands would go towards providing the oil for the lights.

=== Chinese ===
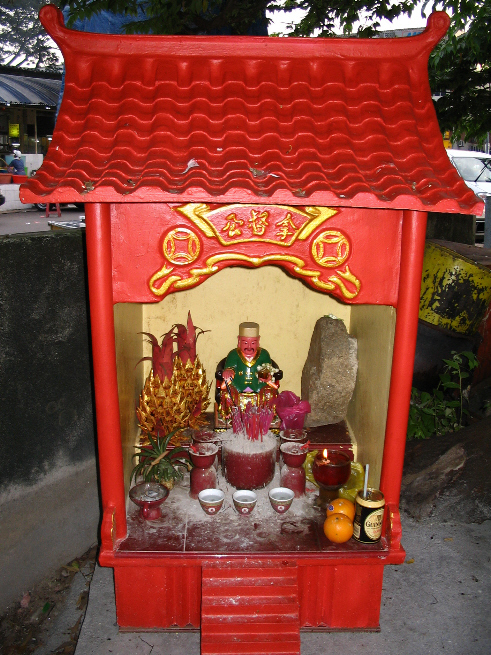
Traditional Chinese shrine in Petaling Jaya, Malaysia, containing an oil lamp

Oil lamps are lit at traditional Chinese shrines before either an image of a deity or a plaque with Classical Chinese characters giving the name of the deity. Such lamps are usually made from clear glass (giving them a similar appearance to normal drinking glasses) and are filled with oil, sometimes with water underneath. A cork or plastic floater containing a wick is placed on top of the oil with the bottom of the wick submerged in the oil.

Such lamps are kept burning in shrines, whether private or public, and incense sticks or joss sticks are lit from the lamp.

== History ==
Curved stone lamps were found in places dated to the 10th millennium BC (Mesolithic, Middle Stone Age Period, c. 10,300–8000 BC). The oldest stone-oil lamp was found in Lascaux in 1940 in a cave that was inhabited 10,000 to 15,000 years ago.

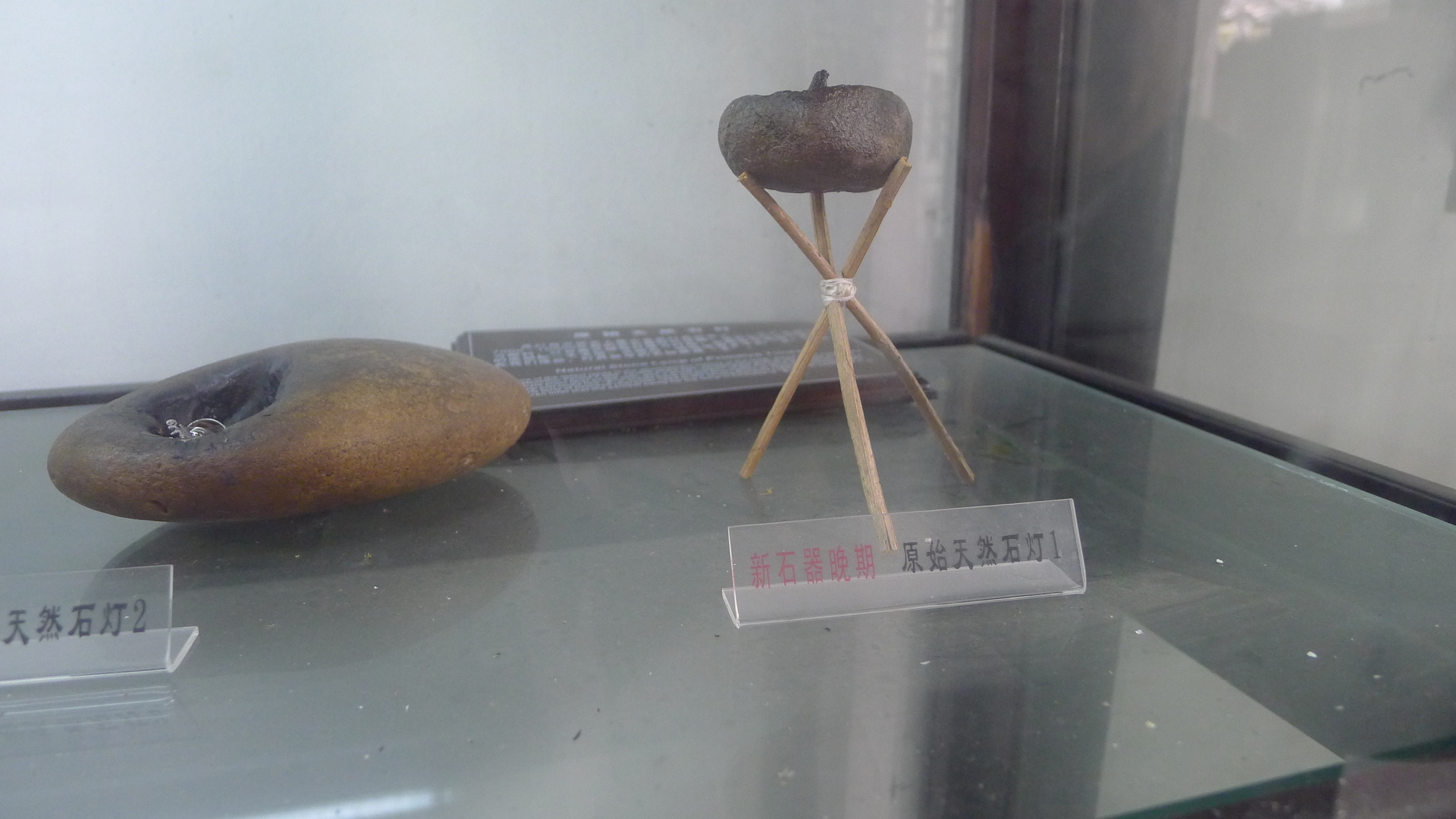
Neolithic stone lamps in the Thousand Lamp Museum in Qiandeng, Kunshan, Suzhou

Some archaeologists claim that the first shell-lamps existed more than 6,000 years ago (Neolithic, Later Stone Age, c. 8500–4500 BC). They believe that the alabaster shell-shaped lamps dug up in Sumerian sites dating to 2600 BC were imitations of real shell-lamps that had been used for a long time (Early Bronze Age, Canaanite/Bronze I–IV, c. 3300–2000 BC).

It is generally agreed that the evolution of handmade lamps moved from bowl-shaped to saucer-shaped, then from saucer with a nozzle, to a closed bowl with a spout.

=== Chalcolithic Age (4500–3300 BC) ===
The first manufactured red pottery oil lamps appeared in the Chalcolithic. These were of the round bowl type.

=== Bronze Age (3200–1200 BC) ===
Bronze Age lamps were simple wheel-made bowls with a slight pinch on four sides for the wick. Later lamps had only one pinch. These lamps vary in the shape of the rim, the general shape of the bowl and the shape of the base.

==== Intermediate Bronze Age (EBIV/MBI) ====
A design with four spouts for wicks appeared in the Intermediate Bronze Age (2300-2000 BC). Lamps are made from large bowls with flattened bases for stability, and four equally spaced shallow pinches in the rim for wicks, although some lamps with only a single pinch have also been found. The four-spout design evolved to provide sufficient light when fueled with fish or animal oils, which burn less efficiently than olive oil.

==== Middle Bronze Age lamps (MB) ====
The four-wick oil lamps persist into this period. However, most lamps now have only one wick. Early in this period the pinch is shallow, while later on it becomes more prominent and the mouth protrudes from the lamp's body. The bases are simple and flat. The crude potter's wheel is introduced, transforming the handmade bowls to a more uniform container. The saucer style evolves into a single spout shape.

==== Late Bronze Age lamps (LB) ====
A more pronounced, deeper single spout is developed, and it is almost closed on the sides. The shape is evolving to be more triangular, deeper and larger. All lamps are now wheel-made, with simple and usually flat bases.

=== Iron Age (1200–560 BC) ===
During the Iron Age, lamp rims become wider and flatter, with a deeper and higher spout. The tip of the spout is more upright in contrast to the rest of the rim. The lamps are becoming variable in shape and distribution, although some remain similar to lamps from the Late Bronze period. In addition, other forms evolve, such as small lamps with a flat base and larger lamps with a round base. The later form continues into the Iron Age II.

In the later Iron Age, variant forms appear. One common type is small, with a wide rim and a wide base. Another type is a small, shallow bowl with a thick and high discus base.

=== Arctic ===
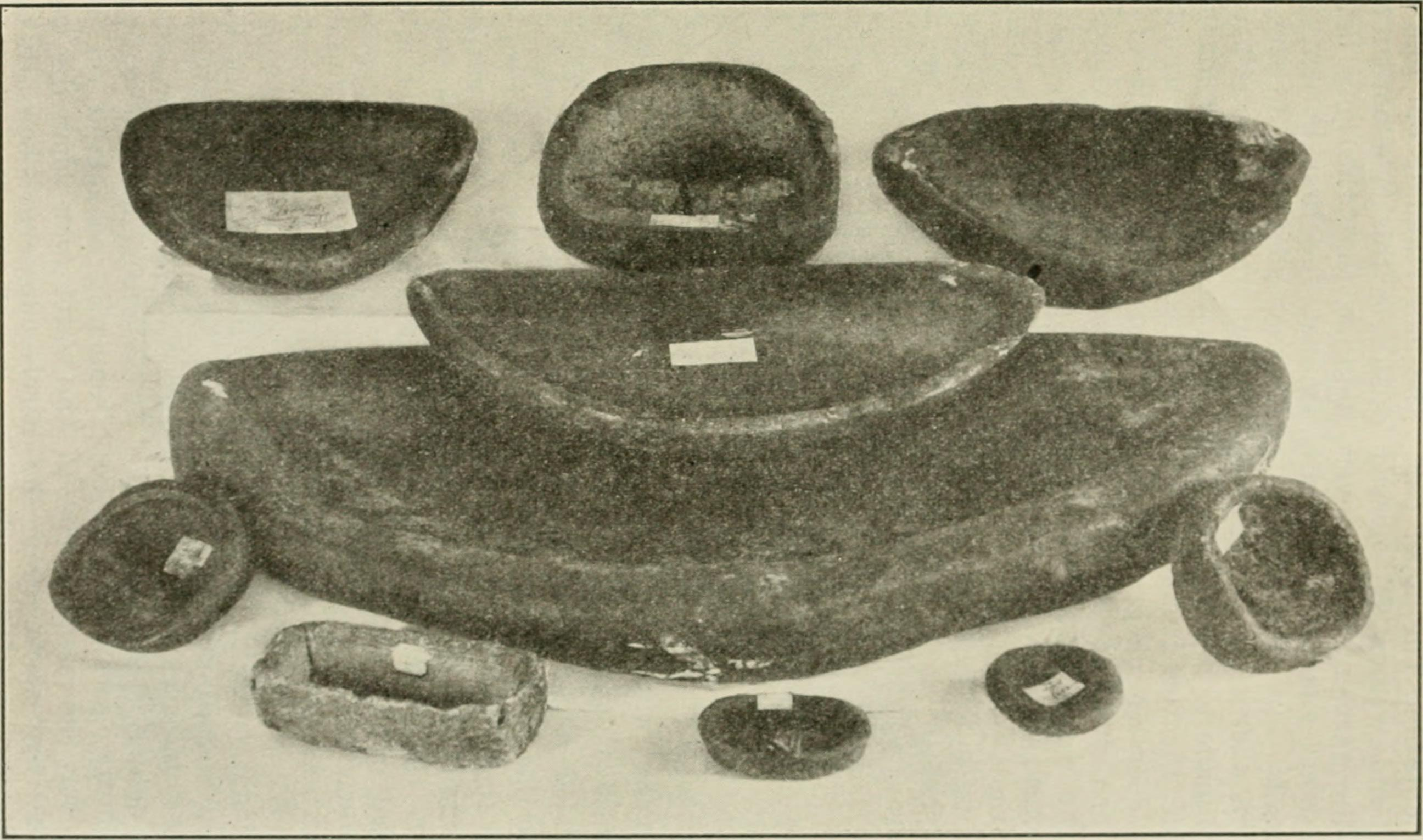
Seal oil lamps

The qulliq (seal-oil lamp) provided warmth and light in the harsh Arctic environment where there was no wood and where the sparse population relied almost entirely on seal oil. This lamp was the most important article of furniture for the Inuit, Yupik and other Inuit peoples.

The lamps were made of stone and their sizes and shapes of lamps could be different, but mostly were elliptical or half-moon shaped. The wicks were mostly made of dried moss or cottongrass and were lit along the edge of the lamp. A slab of seal blubber could be left to melt over the lamp feeding it with more fat.

=== Chinese ===
The earliest Chinese oil lamps are dated from the Warring States period (481–221 BC). The ancient Chinese created oil lamps with a refillable reservoir and a fibrous wick, giving the lamp a controlled flame. Lamps were constructed from jade, bronze, ceramic, wood, stone, and other materials. The largest oil lamp excavated so far is one discovered in a 4th-century tomb located in modern Pingshan, Hebei.

=== Early Islamic ===
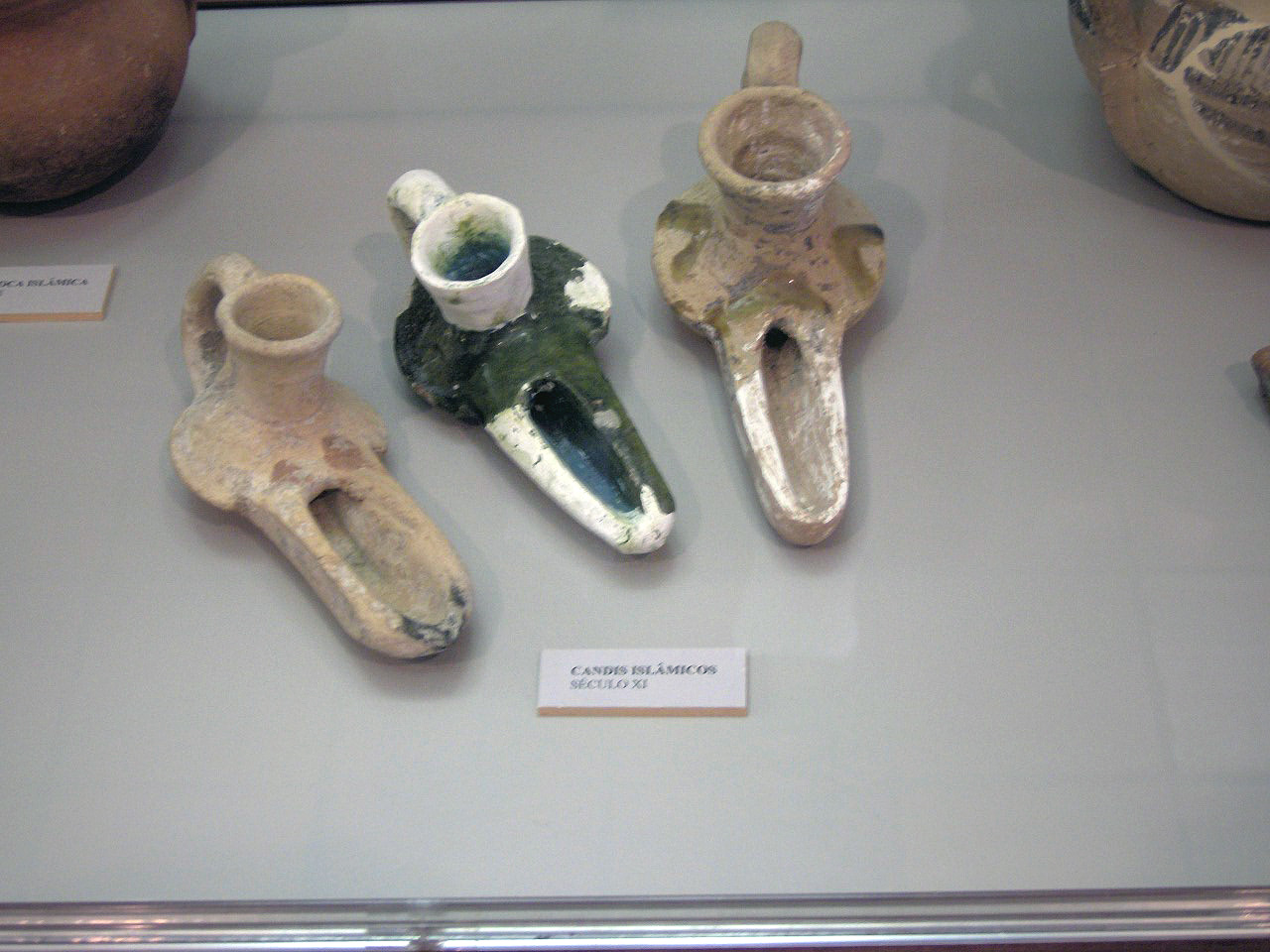
Early Islamic oil lamps (11th century), found in Southern Portugal

There is a transition period from Byzantine to Islamic lamps. The decoration on lamps of this transition period changed from crosses, animals, human likenesses, birds, or fish to plain linear, geometric, and raised-dot patterns.

The early Islamic lamps continued the traditions of Byzantine lamps. Decorations were initially a stylized form of a bird, grain, tree, plant, or flower. Later, they became entirely geometric or linear with raised dots.

An early description of the kerosene lamp comes from 9th-century Baghdad by al-Razi (Rhazes). He referred to it as the Arabic: naffatah in his Kitab al-Asrar ('Book of Secrets').

In the transition period, some lamps had Arabic writing. Writing later disappears until the Mamluk period (13th to 15th century AD).

=== Late Middle Age ===
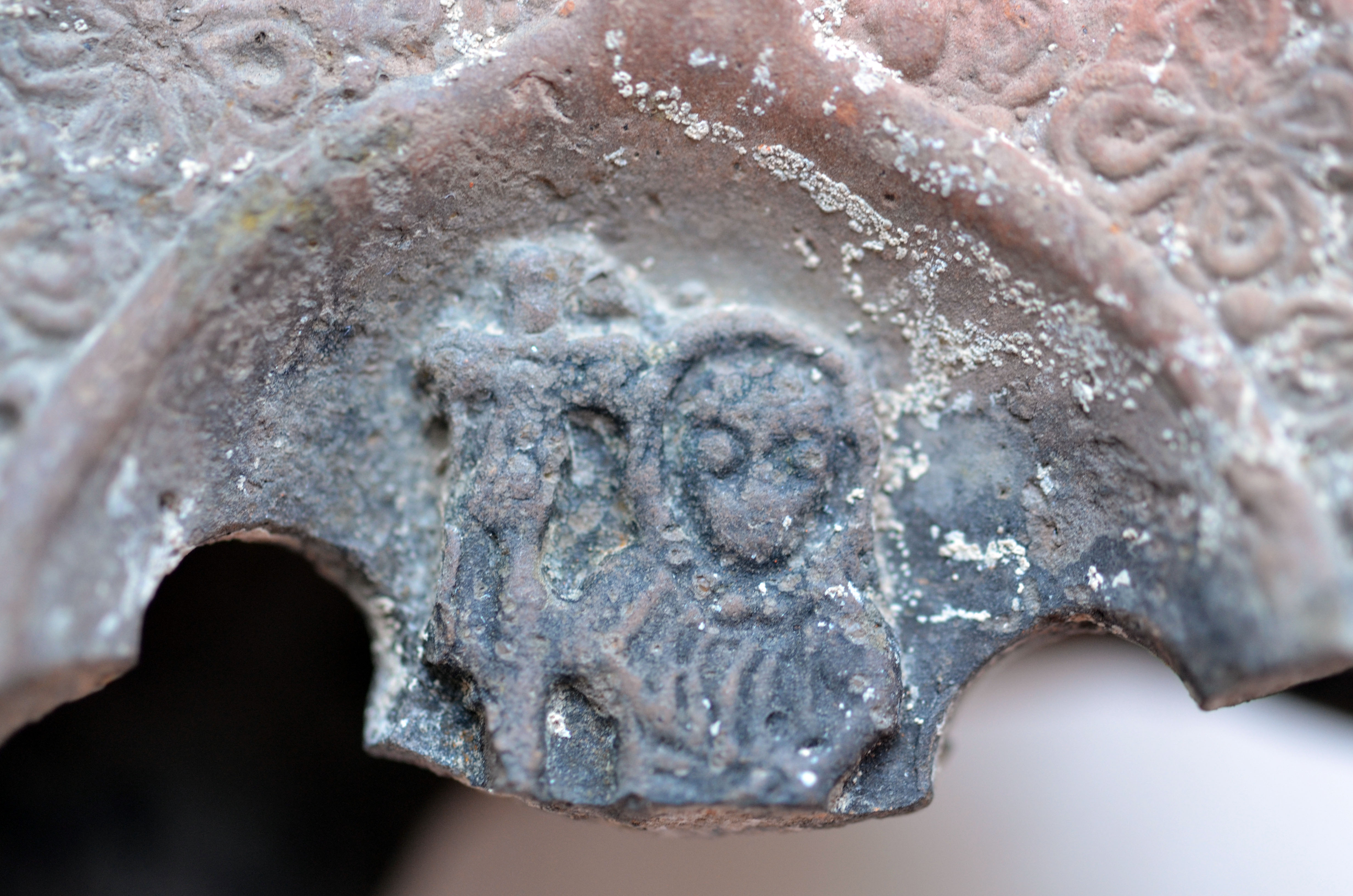
A late antique oil lamp showing a human figure identified as Christ.

Early Christian and late antique oil lamps were diverse. One of the most notable ones were Mediterranean sigillata (“African”) lamps. The motifs were largely geometric, vegetative and graphic (monograms), with figural depiction of animals and human figures, often Christ. Those depicting Christ or the Chi Rho often categorized as Hayes Type II.

=== Industrial age ===
Oil burning carriage lamps provided a model for the first bicycle lamps in the 1860s.

== Regional variations ==
=== Levant ===
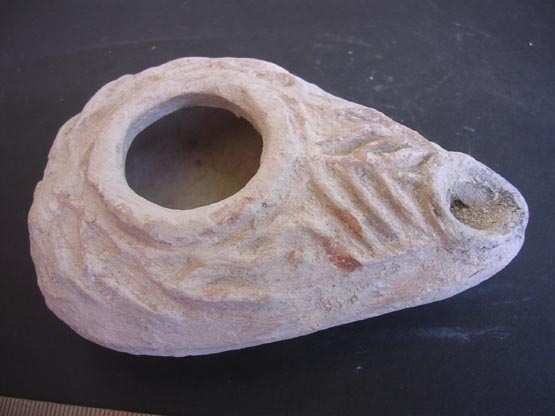
Byzantine period "candlestick" lamp with the typical palm motif found in the Palestinian village of Fandaqomiya (Pentacomia).

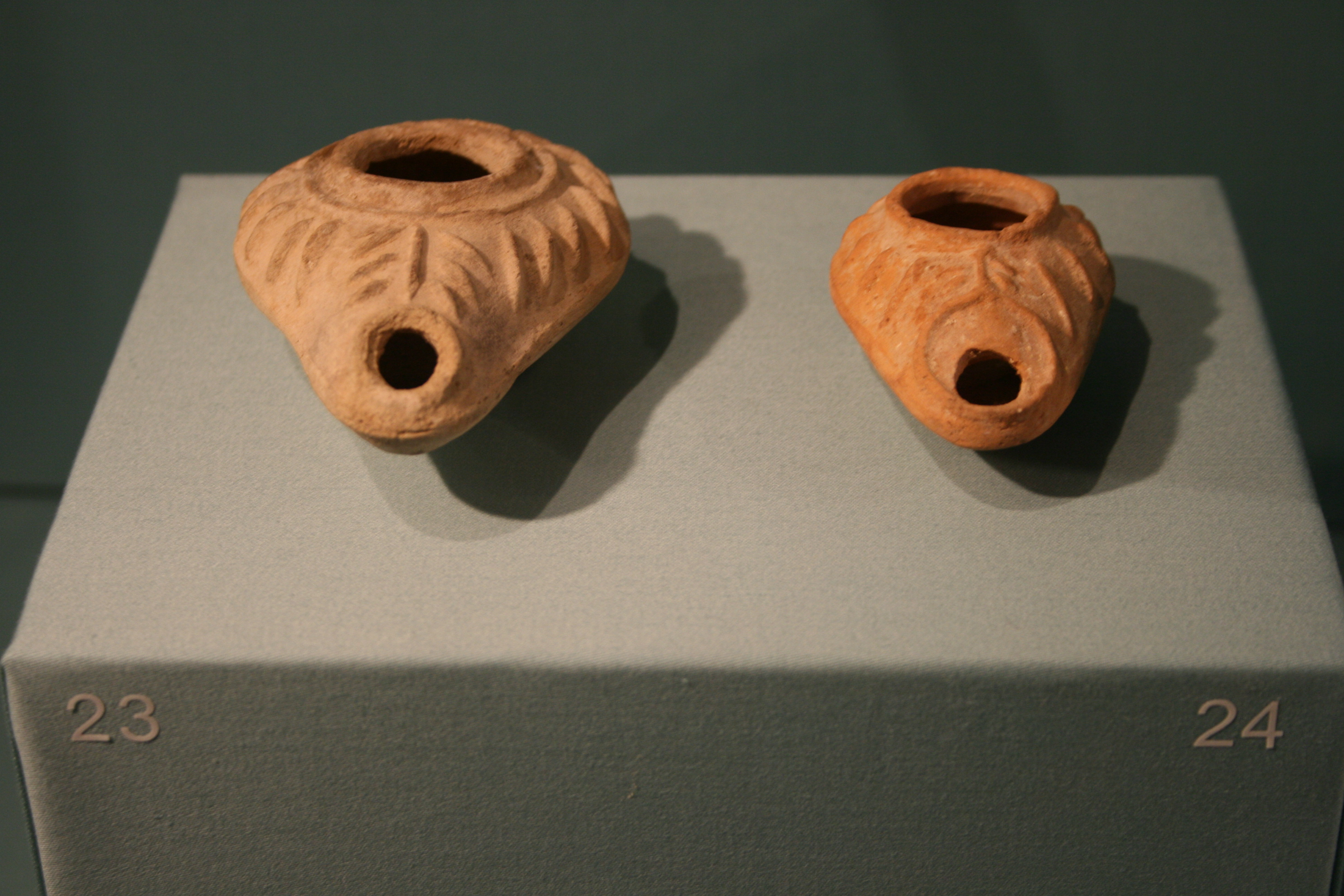
Byzantine lamps with palm-branch motif in exhibit for Egypt and Ancient Near East in a museum in Atlanta

- Jerusalem oil lamp: The clay has a characteristic black color because it was burned without oxygen. Usually of high quality.
- Daroma oil lamp
- Jerash oil lamp
- Nabatean oil lamp
- Herodian oil lamp: Considered to be used mainly by Jews. Wheel-made, rounded, and have a nozzle with concave sides. The lamps are usually not decorated; if there is decoration, it tends to be simple. Very common throughout all of Judea, and some lamps have also been found in Jordan. Date from the 1st century BC to the end of the 1st century AD.
- Menorah oil lamp, seven nozzles: Rare and are associated with Judaism because of the numerical connection with the seven branches or arms of the Menorah.
- Samaritan oil lamp: Characterized by a sealed filling hole, which was to be broken by the buyer. This was probably done to ensure ritual purity. They have a wider spout, and the concavities flanking the nozzle are almost always emphasized with a ladder pattern band. In general, the lamps are uncoated. The decorations are linear or geometric.
  - Type I: A distinct channel runs from the pouring hole to the nozzle. They have a small knob handle, a ladder pattern around the nozzle and no ornamentation on the bottom of the base.
  - Type II: Pear-shaped and elongated, with a lined channel that extends from the filling hole to the nozzle. Continued to be used up to the early Muslim period.
- Candlestick oil lamp: Palm-menorah design on the nozzle and bunch of grapes on the shoulders.
- Byzantine oil lamp: The upper parts and their handles are covered with braided patterns. All are made of a dark orange-red clay. A rounded bottom with a distinct X or cross appears inside the circled base.
- Early Islamic oil lamp: Large knob handle and the channel above the nozzle are the dominant elements of these. The handle is tongue-shaped, and decoration is rich and elegant. The lower parts are extremely broad and the nozzles are pointed.

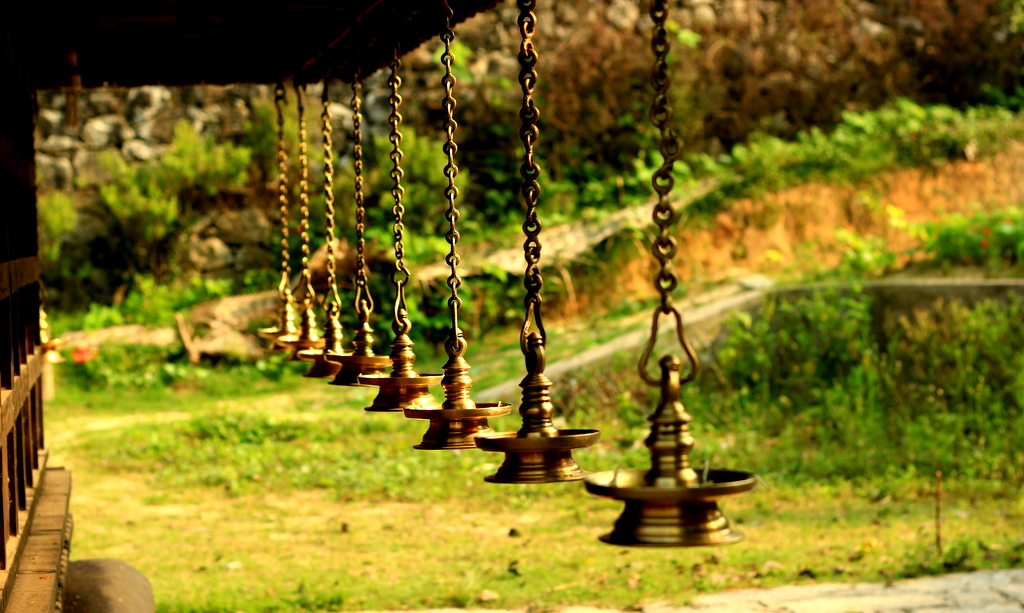
Lamps in a temple at Wayanad, Kerala, India

=== India ===
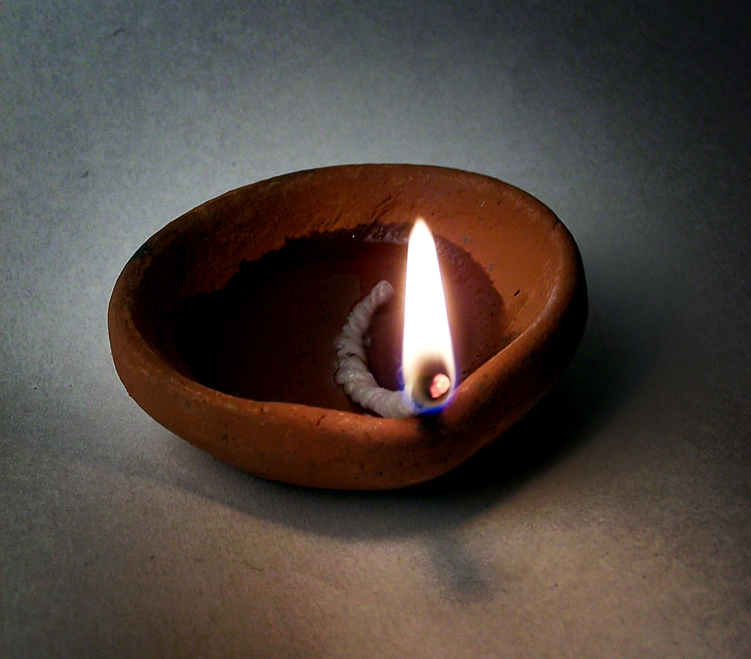
A basic earthen oil lamp used for Diwali

In Vedic times, fire was kept alive in every household in some form and carried with oneself while migrating to new locations. Later, the presence of fire in the household or a religious building was ensured by an oil lamp. Over the years various rituals and customs were woven around an oil lamp.

For Deep Daan, the gift of a lamp was and still is believed to be the best daan ('donation'). During marriages, spinsters of the household stand behind the bride and groom, holding an oil lamp to ward off evil. The presence of an oil lamp is an important aspect of ritual worship (the Shodashopachar Puja) offered to a deity. Moreover, a day is kept aside for the worship of the lamp in the busy festival calendar, on one amavasya (moonless) day in the month of Shravan. This reverence for the deep is based on the symbolism of the journey from darkness and ignorance to light and the knowledge of the ultimate reality – "tamaso ma jyotirgamaya".

Earlier lamps were made out of stone or seashells. The shape was like a circular bowl with a protruding beak. Later, they were replaced by earthen and metal lamps. In the epics Ramayana and Mahabharata, there are references to gold and silver lamps as well. The simple shape evolved and the lamps were created in the shapes of the matsya ('fish'), kurma ('tortoise') and other incarnations of god Vishnu. Lamps were also created in the shape of the many emblems of gods, like conch shells or lotuses. Birds such as swans, peacocks, or parrots, and animals like snakes, lions, elephants and horses were also favorites when decorating a lamp. For lighting multiple lamps, wooden and stone deepastambhas ('towers of light') were created.

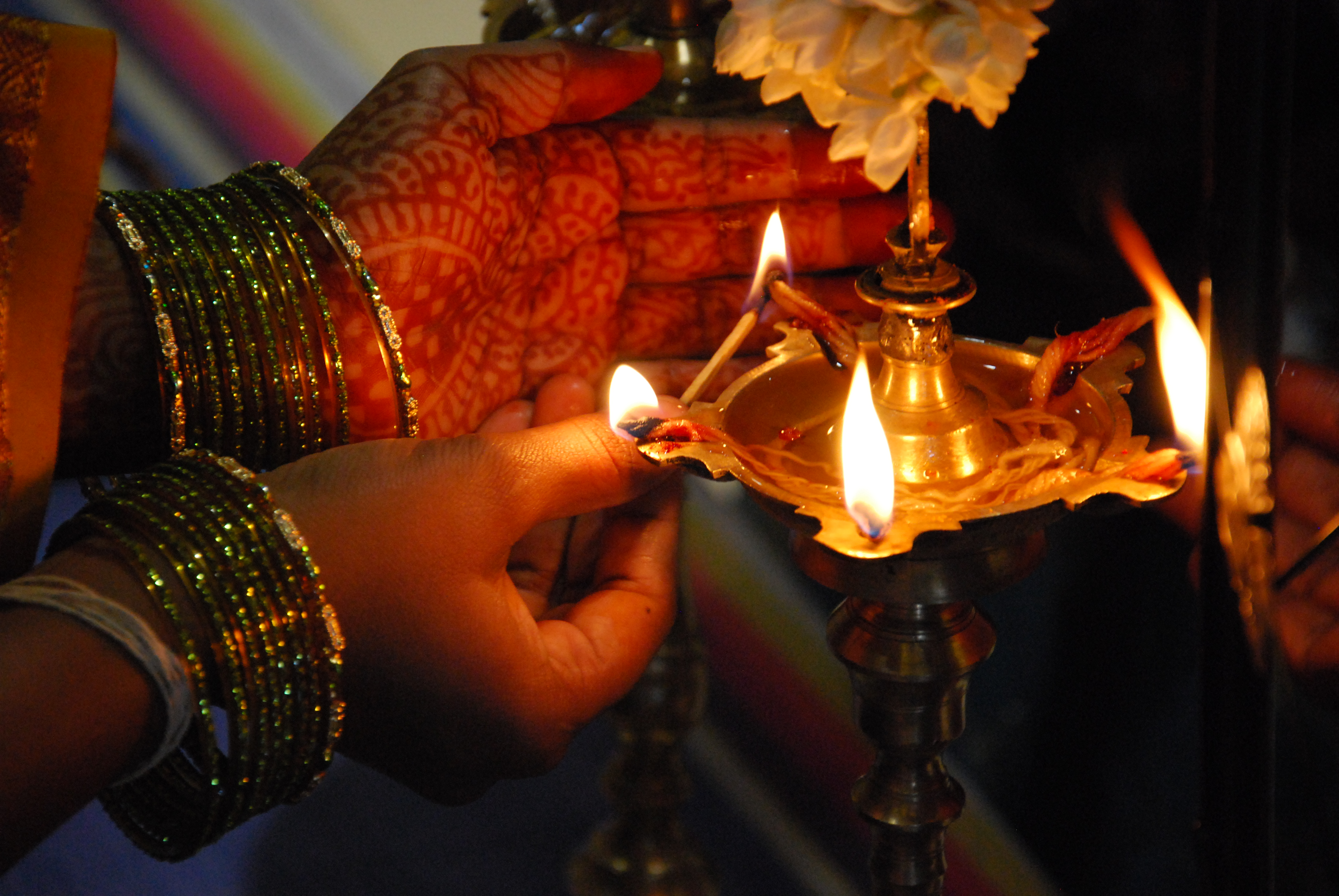
Lighting of a Kuthuvilakku

Erecting a deepastambha in front of a temple is still a general practice in western and southern India. In some of the South Indian temples, raised brass lamp towers called Kamba Vilakku can be seen. To adapt the design to households and smaller spaces, the deepavriksha ('tree of light') was created. As the name suggests, it is a metal lamp container with curvi-linear lines branching out from the base, each holding a lamp. The Deepalakshmi is another common design, where the goddess Lakshmi holds the lamp in her hands. Kuthuvilakku is another typical lamp traditionally used for household purposes in South India.

Oil lamps also were included in proverbs. For example, a Bradj (pre-Hindi) proverb says, "Chiraag tale andhera", 'the [utmost] darkness is under the oil-lamp (chiraag)', meaning that what you seek could be close but unnoticed (right under your nose or feet), in various senses (a lamp's container casts a strong shadow).

== See also ==
- Ancient Roman oil lamp
- Kerosene lamp
- Lantern
- Lewis lamp
- List of light sources
- Timeline of lighting technology
- Diya (lamp)
