= List of ships named Medina =

Several ships have been named Medina:

- Medina (1811 ship) was launched in 1811 and quickly became a West Indiaman. Ten years later she started sailing to the East Indies under a license from the British East India Company (EIC). She made two voyages transporting convicts to Australia, first to Sydney and then to Hobart. She also brought immigrants to the Swan River Colony. On that voyage she sustained damage that caused her to be condemned in July 1831.
- PS Medina, a Red Funnel paddle steamer
- RMS Medina (1911), a steamship liner for the Peninsular and Oriental Steam Navigation Company
- SS Medina (1914), an ocean liner for the Mallory Line; renamed Roma (1949), Franca C. (1952), and Doulos (1978); opened as a land-based hotel ship in 2019

== See also ==
- HMS Medina - any one of a number of vessels and shore establishments
  - Medina-class gunboat, a class of 12 Royal Navy gunboats
