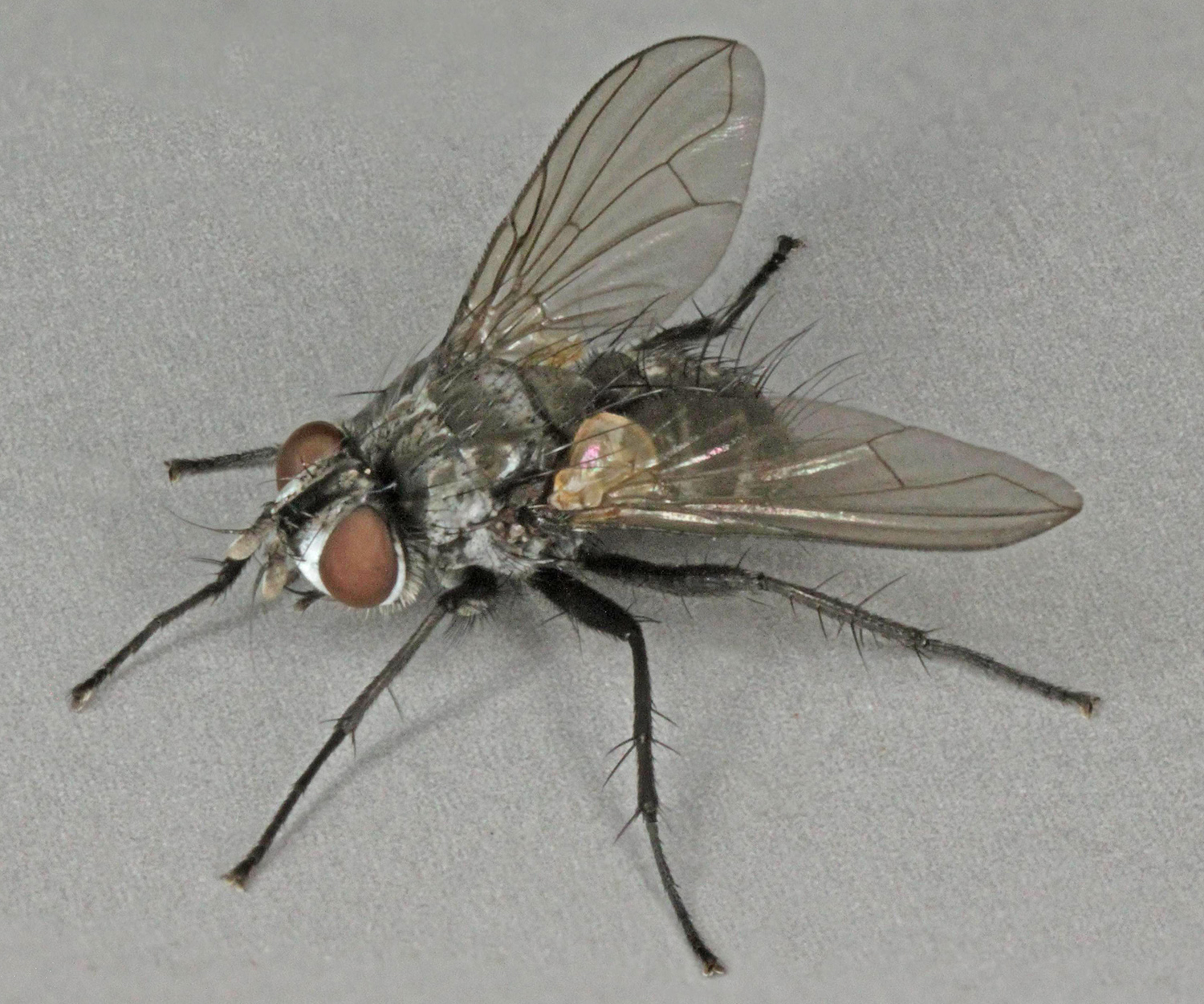
- Medina collaris North Wales

Scientific classification
- Kingdom: Animalia
- Phylum: Arthropoda
- Class: Insecta
- Order: Diptera
- Family: Tachinidae
- Subfamily: Exoristinae
- Tribe: Blondeliini
- Genus: Medina
- Species: M. collaris

Binomial name
- Medina collaris (Fallen, 1820)

Synonyms
- Tachina collaris Fallén, 1820; Medina cylindrica Robineau-Desvoidy, 1830; Metopia cylindroidea Macquart, 1835; Degeeria ornata Meigen, 1838; Tachina semizonata Zetterstedt, 1849; Degeeria fuscanipennis Macquart, 1851

= Medina collaris =

Species of fly

Medina collaris is a species of fly in the family Tachinidae.

== Distribution ==
Palearctic.

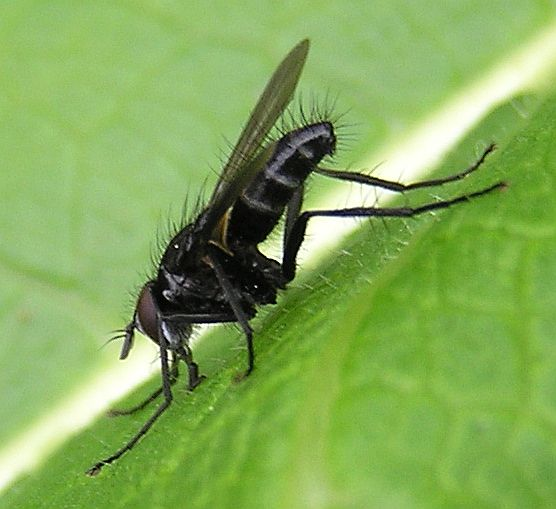

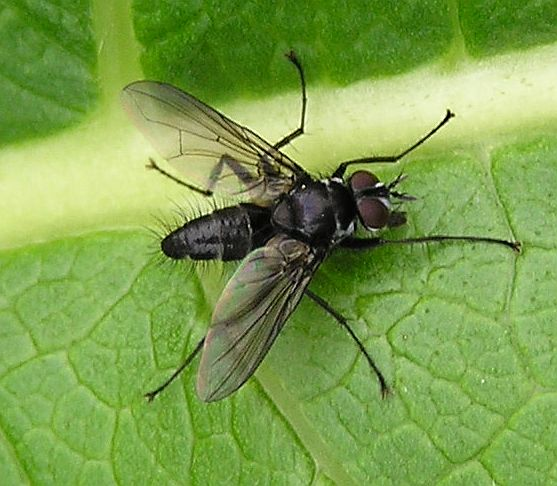
