= Madinah (disambiguation) =

Madinah (مدينة) means city in Arabic.

Al-Madinah with the definite article al (Arabic: المدينة, romanized: al-Madīnah, lit. 'The City') is related to the Muslim holy city of Medina, also called by a longer name, Al-Madīnah al-Munawwarah (المدينة المنوّرة). Al-Madinah can be short for Al Madinah Region or Madinah Province, a region in western Saudi Arabia that includes the city of Medina.

Madinah / Al Madinah may also refer to:

== Places ==
- Al Madinah Region, Saudi Arabia
- Madinah Airport, better known as Prince Mohammad bin Abdulaziz Airport, a regional airport in Medina, Saudi Arabia
- Madinah, Iran, a village in Khuzestan Province

== Education ==
- Al-Madinah International University, a Malaysian university
- Islamic University of Madinah, a Saudi university in Medina
- Al-Madinah School, a pre-kindergarten to 12th grade school in New York

== Other uses ==
- Al-Madinah Cultural Center, Medina

== See also ==
- Medina (disambiguation)
- Madina (disambiguation)
