= Al Madeena Islamic complex =

Al Madeena Islamic complex (مجمع مدينة الاسلامى), also known as Al Madeena Yatheem Khana (دار الايتام) is an Islamic university in Mangaluru, Karnataka, India, established on 17 March 1994. It has 500 students including 110 orphans studying Qur'an, Hadith, Fiq’h, Arts, Science and Technology under different institutes. The institution was founded by Sheikhuna Sharaful Ulama Manjanady Abbas Musliyar.Kanthapuram A. P. Aboobacker Musliyar is its present President.

== Minority institution ==
The complex, consisting of religious educational center and orphanage, is a Muslim minority institution. An orphan house, Islamic college (Dars), English medium school, high school, Hifzul quran, tailoring training center are part of the complex.

== Institutions under Al Madeena ==
- Yatheem khana (Orphanage)
- Sharia college (Islamic studies)
- Boarding Madrasa
- Islamic Library
- English Medium School
- High School
- Tailoring Institution
- Shopping Complex
- Community Hall
- Al Madeena Dawa College
- Al Madeena Hiflul Quran College
- Al Madeena Women's College
- Al Madeena Women's Shareeath College
- Al Madeena North Karnataka Home
- Al Madeena Computer Technology Services

== See also ==
- Abbas Msuliyar
- List of educational institutions in Mangaluru
- Markazu Saqafathi Sunniya
