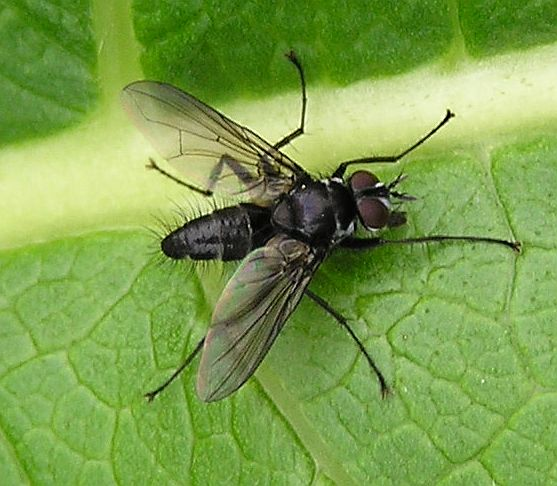
- Medina collaris

Scientific classification
- Kingdom: Animalia
- Phylum: Arthropoda
- Class: Insecta
- Order: Diptera
- Family: Tachinidae
- Subfamily: Exoristinae
- Tribe: Blondeliini
- Genus: Medina; Robineau-Desvoidy, 1830

Type species
- Medina cylindrica Robineau-Desvoidy, 1830

Synonyms
- Midina Rondani, 1866; Degeeria Meigen, 1838; Coxendix Gistel, 1848; Mollia Robineau-Desvoidy, 1863; Velocia Robineau-Desvoidy, 1863; Arrhinomyia Brauer & von Bergenstamm, 1889; Amedoria Brauer & von Bergenstamm, 1889; Methypostena Townsend, 1908; Torynotachina Townsend, 1915; Odontosoma Townsend, 1916; Molliopsis Townsend, 1933

= Medina (fly) =

Genus of flies

Medina is a genus of flies in the family Tachinidae.

== Species ==
- Medina abdominalis Mesnil, 1971
- Medina barbata (Coquillett, 1895)
- Medina carbonata Mesnil, 1968
- Medina cinctella (Villeneuve, 1950)
- Medina collaris (Fallén, 1820)
- Medina confinis Ziegler & Shima, 1996
- Medina crocea (Villeneuve, 1950)
- Medina decellei Verbeke, 1964
- Medina denticulata (Villeneuve, 1950)
- Medina egregia (Villeneuve, 1950)
- Medina expergita (Walker, 1861)
- Medina fumipennis Townsend, 1926
- Medina fuscisquama Mesnil, 1953
- Medina hamata (Wulp, 1890)
- Medina lateralis (Villeneuve, 1950)
- Medina leskiaeformis Herting, 1973
- Medina longipes (Wulp, 1890)
- Medina luctuosa (Meigen, 1824)
- Medina malayana (Townsend, 1926)
- Medina melania (Meigen, 1824)
- Medina mira Mesnil, 1977
- Medina multispina (Herting, 1966)
- Medina nigra Mesnil, 1968
- Medina ouelleti (Curran, 1925)
- Medina pectinifera Mesnil, 1977
- Medina quinteri (Townsend, 1915)
- Medina rubricosa (Villeneuve, 1913)
- Medina semirufa (Villeneuve, 1950)
- Medina separata (Meigen, 1824)
- Medina setosella (Villeneuve, 1950)
- Medina sopha Mesnil, 1977
- Medina spinosa (Coquillett, 1897)
- Medina spinulifera Mesnil, 1968
- Medina succuba Mesnil, 1977
- Medina vidua Mesnil, 1977
