= Medina College (disambiguation) =

Medina College is a trust-supported secondary school in Newport on the Isle of Wight, formerly Medina High School.

Medina College may also refer to:

- Medina College-Ipil, a school in Ipil, Philippines
- Medina College-Pagadian, a school in Pagadian City, Philippines
- Medina College-Ozamiz, a school in Ozamiz City, Philippines
