= Madina Mosque (Preston) =

Mosque in Lancashire, England, United Kingdom

Coordinates: 53.76126°N 2.6792°W

Madina Mosque is a mosque in Preston, Lancashire, England.
