= MEDINA =

Universal pre-/postprocessor for finite element analysis

- Developer: Kube GmbH Ingenieurbüro
- Source model: Closed source
- Latest release: 9.0.8
- Marketing target: Simulation tasks in Automotive, Aerospace & Defence, Energy, Manufacturing Industries
- License: Proprietary commercial software
- Official website: https://www.medina-software.de

Model Editor Interactive for Numerical Simulation Analysis (MEDINA) is a piece of software utilized in the manufacturing and engineering sector to simulate the properties of objects designed using computer-aided design (CAD) before their fabrication. The development of MEDINA began in the early 1990s at Daimler-Benz AG, building on previous work carried out at "Debis Systemhaus". In 2001, T-Systems International GmbH took over the support and development of MEDINA. In 2024, Kube GmbH Ingenieurbüro acquired MEDINA, taking over the support and development.

== Architecture and interfaces ==
MEDINA was developed as a pre- and post-processing tool for various domains within finite element analysis (FEA). It is compatible with most widely used CAD formats, solver applications and can run on two operating systems: Linux and Microsoft Windows.

== Characteristic ==
MEDINA was developed to handle complex simulation tasks and large finite element (FE) models efficiently.
