= De Medina =

De Medina is a surname. Notable people with the surname include:

- Bartolomé de Medina (theologian) (1527–1581), Spanish theologian
- Eduardo Diez de Medina (1881–1955)
- Federico Diez de Medina (1839–1904)
- Juan de Medina (1490–1547)
- Lucila Gamero de Medina (1873–1964)
- Miguel de Medina (1489–1578)
- Nathan de Medina (born 1997), Belgian footballer
- Samuel de Medina (1505–1589)
- Solomon de Medina (1650–1730)

== See also ==
- Medina
