= Medina High School =

Medina High School may refer to the following secondary schools:

- Medina College in Newport, Isle of Wight, England, formerly known as Medina High School
- Medina High School (Medina, Ohio) in Medina, Ohio, USA
- Medina High School (Texas) in Medina, Texas, USA
- Medina High School (New York) in Medina, New York, USA
