= Madineh =

Madineh مدينه
- Village
- Location within Iran
- Coordinates: 30°46′48″N 48°48′45″E
- Country: Iran
- Province: Khuzestan
- County: Shadegan
- Bakhsh: Central
- Rural District: Buzi

Population (2006)
  - Total: 157
- Time zone: UTC+3:30 (IRST)
  - Summer (DST): UTC+4:30 (IRDT)

Madineh (Persian: مدينه, also romanized as Madīneh, Madinah, and Madyāneh) is a village in Buzi Rural District, in the Central District of Shadegan County, Khuzestan Province, Iran]. At the 2006 census its population was 157, in 25 families.
