= Médine =

Médine may refer to:

== Places ==
- Medina, Saudi Arabia
- Médine, Mali, a village and principal settlement (chef-lieu) of the commune of Hawa Dembaya in the Cercle of Kayes in the Kayes Region of south-western Mali

== People ==
- Médine (rapper) (born 1983), French rapper
- Medine Erkan (born 1995), Turkish women's footballer
