= Medina Township =

Medina Township may refer to the following places in the United States:

- Medina Township, Peoria County, Illinois
- Medina Township, Warren County, Indiana
- Medina Township, Michigan
- Medina Township, Medina County, Ohio
