= HMS Medina =

Several ships and shore establishments of the Royal Navy have borne the name HMS Medina, after the River Medina on the Isle of Wight:

- HMS Medina (1772) was a yacht that served the Governor of the Isle of Wight; she was broken up at Portsmouth in 1832.
- HMS Medina (1813) was a Cyrus-class post ship; she was sold in 1832.
- HMS Medina (1840) was a 2-gun Merlin-class paddle packet boat completed in 1840. She was converted into a survey ship in 1856 and broken up in March 1864.
- HMS Medina (1876) was a Medina-class gunboat launched 1876, sold in 1904.
- HMS Medina (1916), an Admiralty M-class destroyer that served during the First World War. The ship was originally named Redmill but renamed before being launched in 1916 and was sold for breaking up in 1921.
- HMS Medina (shore establishment), landing craft and Fleet Air Arm shore establishment, Puckpool, Ryde, Isle of Wight.
