= Medina (surname) =

Medina is a common Mediterranean toponymic surname of Spanish-Moorish and Sephardic Jewish origin.

The surname was derived from several cities and towns of Spain such as Medina del Campo, Medina de Pomar, Medina de Rioseco, Medinaceli, Medina-Sidonia and Medina de las Torres, Italy, such as Medina, Campania and Malta, such as Mdina. The use of the term dates back to the Muslim rule of Al-Andalus, the Emirate of Sicily and the times of Islam in Malta (8th–15th century) and it originates from the Arabic word madīnah (مَدِيْنَة), which means "city", ultimately derived from Aramaic. Many families that came new to these places took it as a surname during the Reconquista. The surname was imported to the Spanish colonies by the conquistadores. Medina is a common surname among Moriscos and Conversos/Marranos too.

Notable people with the surname include:

- Adela Medina (born 1978), Argentine footballer
- Adonis Medina (born 1996), Dominican baseball player
- Alberto Medina Briseño (born 1983), Mexican footballer
- Alex Vincent Medina (born 1986), Filipino film actor
- Alexander Medina Reobasco (born 1978), Uruguayan footballer
- Ana Medina, Venezuela's ambassador to Poland appointed by the National Assembly
- Anabel Medina Garrigues (born 1982), Spanish tennis player
- Andrea Medina (born 2004), Spanish footballer
- Ann Medina, American-born Canadian journalist and documentary producer
- Antonio Medina (disambiguation)
- Astrid Medina (born 1977), Colombian coffee producer
- Avihu Medina (born 1948), Israeli singer-songwriter
- Benny Medina (born 1958), American music producer, talent manager and record executive
- Biel Medina Piris (born 1980), Spanish footballer
- Brian Medina (born 1993), Argentine footballer
- Carlos Medina (born 1953), Venezuelan plastic artist
- César Medina Lozado (born 1991), Peruvian footballer
- Chris Medina (born 1983), American singer and American Idol contestant
- Claribel Medina (born 1961), Puerto Rican actress
- Cristian Medina (born 2002), Argentine footballer
- Danilo Medina Sánchez (born 1951), Dominican politician and President of the Dominican Republic from 2012 to 2020
- David M. Medina (born 1958), former Texas Supreme Court justice
- Diego Medina (footballer, born 1991), Argentine footballer
- Ernest Medina (1936–2018), US Army captain, commanding officer of the unit responsible for the My Lai Massacre
- Facundo Medina (born 1999), Argentine footballer
- Fernando Medina (born 1973), Portuguese politician and mayor of Lisbon
- Flavio Medina (born 1971), Mexican actor
- Gabriel Medina (born 1993), Brazilian professional surfer
- Gabriela Medina (Chilean actress) (1935–2025), Chilean actress
- Gabriela Medina (sprinter) (born 1985), Mexican sprinter
- Henrique Medina (1901–1988), Portuguese painter
- Herme Medina Agüero (1944–2016) Paraguayan poet and musician
- Hernán Medina (footballer) (born 1974), Argentine retired footballer
- Humberto Medina (dancer), Cuban dancer
- Humberto Medina (footballer) (1942–2011), Mexican footballer
- Iizzwa Medina (born 1982), Honduran table tennis player
- Isaías Medina Angarita (1897–1953), Venezuelan soldier and politician, President of Venezuela (1941–1945)
- Jaume Medina i Casanovas (1949–2023), Catalan philologist, Latinist, writer, translator and poet
- John Baptist Medina (1659–1710), artist of Flemish-Spanish origin who worked in England and Scotland
- Jorge Medina (1968–2022), Bolivian civil right activist and politician
- Jorge Medina (cardinal) (1926–2021), Chilean cardinal of the Catholic Church
- José Medina (disambiguation)
- Juan Medina (disambiguation)
- Julio Medina III (born 1976), Panamanian footballer
- Leonardo Medina (Mexican football manager) (born 1970)
- Leonardo Medina (Uruguayan footballer) (born 1977), Uruguayan football manager and former player
- Leonardo Guillén Medina (born 1976), Mexican politician
- Lina Medina (born 1933), Peruvian woman, youngest mother in recorded history
- Lizbeth Medina (2007–2023), American female murder victim
- Luis Medina (disambiguation), several people
- Luiz Carlos Medina (born 1990), Brazilian footballer
- Maria Medina (disambiguation)
- Maxine Medina (born 1990), Filipina actress and beauty pageant titleholder
- Nery Medina Norales (born 1981), Honduran footballer
- Nicolás Medina (born 1982), Argentine footballer
- Nicolás Esteban Medina Ríos (born 1987), Chilean footballer
- Ninrrol Medina (born 1976), Honduran footballer and football manager
- Ofelia Medina (born 1950), Mexican actress
- Pablo Medina (born 1960), Cuban poet
- Pablo Medina Velázquez (c. 1961–2014), Paraguayan journalist
- Patricia Medina (1919–2012), English actress
- Paula Medina (born 1989), Colombian table tennis player
- Pen Medina (born 1950), Filipino actor
- Ping Medina (born 1983), Filipino film actor
- Pol Medina, Jr. (born 1960), Filipino comics artist
- Rafael Medina (born 1979), Mexican professional footballer
- Rafael Medina (baseball) (born 1975), Panamanian former Major League Baseball pitcher
- Ramón Medina Bello (born 1966), Argentine retired footballer
- Ricardo Medina, Jr. (born 1979), American actor
- Roberto Medina (born 1947), Brazilian businessman
- Roberto Medina (born 1968), Mexican football manager and former player
- Rubem Medina (1942–2026), Brazilian politician, economist and businessman
- Salvador Medina Cárcamo (born 1988), Mexican footballer
- Salvadora Medina Onrubia (1894–1972), Argentine poet, anarchist, and feminist
- Samuel Doria Medina (born 1958), Bolivian politician
- Stefan Medina Ramírez (born 1992), Colombian footballer
- Thiago Medina (born 2003), Brazilian politician
- Tony Medina (died 2011), Cuban songwriter
- Tulia Angela Medina (born 1983), Colombian weightlifter
- Vincent Medina (born 1986), American indigenous rights activist
- Wilder Medina (born 1981), Colombian footballer
- Willian dos Santos Medina (born 1992), Brazilian footballer
- Yoervis Medina (1988–2025), Venezuelan Major League Baseball player
- Yojer Medina (born 1973), Venezuelan shot putter and discus thrower

== See also ==
- Medina (disambiguation)
- Medina (given name)
- De Medina
