= Capáez =

Capáez may refer to:

== Places ==
- Capáez, Adjuntas, Puerto Rico, a barrio in the municipality of Adjuntas, Puerto Rico
- Capáez, Hatillo, Puerto Rico, a barrio in the municipality of Hatillo, Puerto Rico
