= Puerto Rico Highway 130 =

Highway in Puerto Rico

Highway 130
- Ruta 130
- Carretera Estatal Carlos Romero Barceló

Route information
- Maintained by Puerto Rico DTPW
- Length: 12.1 km (7.5 mi)
- Existed: 1953–present

Major junctions
- South end: PR-129 in Campo Alegre
- PR-490 in Buena Vista–Naranjito–Campo Alegre–Corcovado; PR-487 / PR-488 in Buena Vista–Naranjito; PR-491 in Naranjito; PR-492 in Naranjito–Capáez; PR-2 in Hatillo barrio-pueblo
- North end: PR-119 in Hatillo barrio-pueblo

Location
- Country: United States
- Territory: Puerto Rico
- Municipalities: Hatillo

Highway system
- Roads in Puerto Rico; List
← PR-129	→ PR-131

Puerto Rico Highway 130 (PR-130) is the main north–south route within the municipality of Hatillo, Puerto Rico. This road extends from PR-119 in downtown Hatillo to PR-129 in Campo Alegre barrio.

== Route description ==
The highway starts from the downtown area (from PR-119), crossing the neighborhoods of Capáez, Naranjito, Buena Vista and Campo Alegre until its end at Carretera Mariana Bracetti (PR-129). In downtown, the highway runs through Calle Luis H. Lacomba and Avenida Pablo J. Aguilar until it crosses PR-2 in a southerly direction. This route is part of the caravan of the Hatillo Mask Festival.

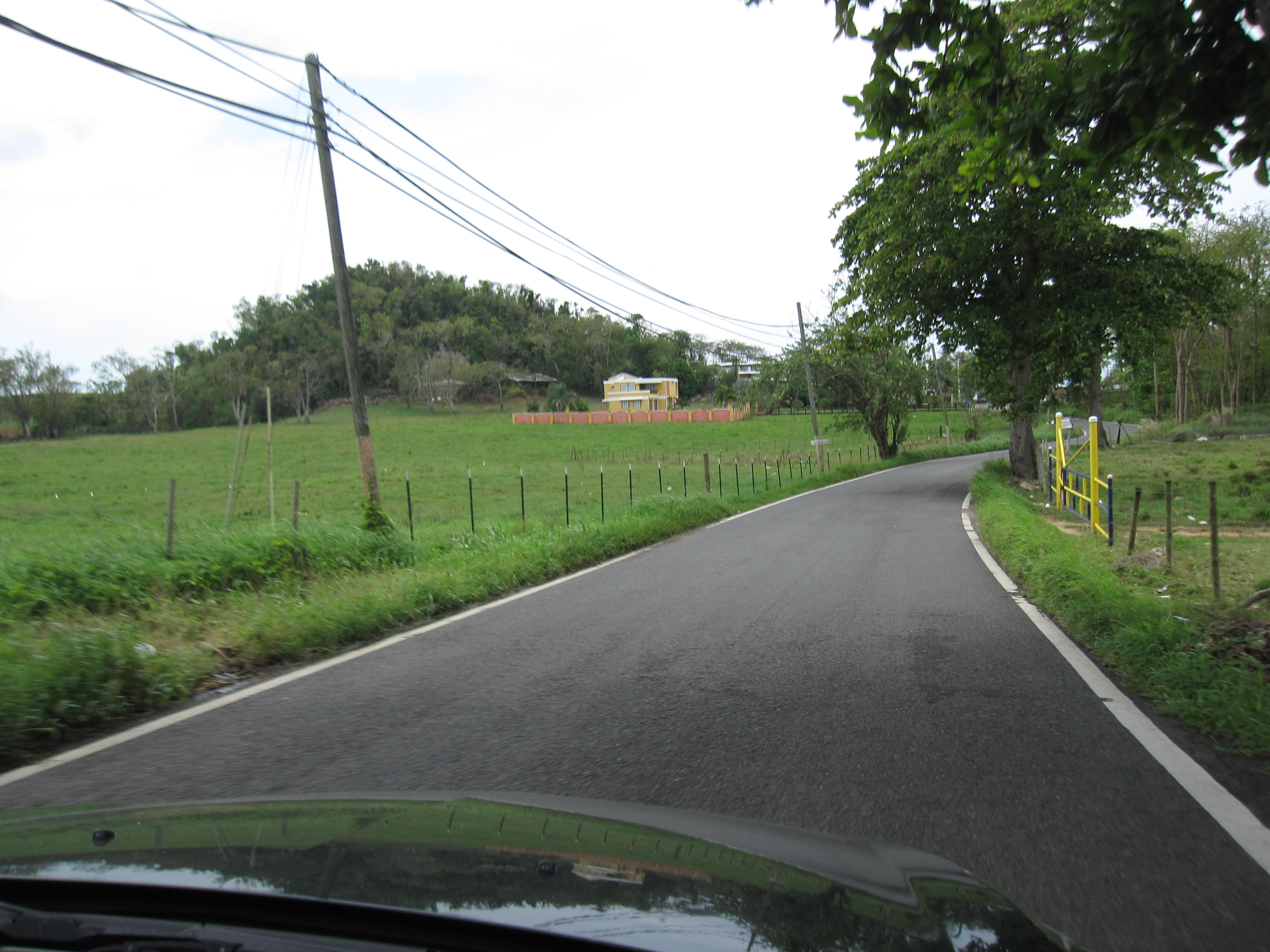
Puerto Rico highway 130 heading north

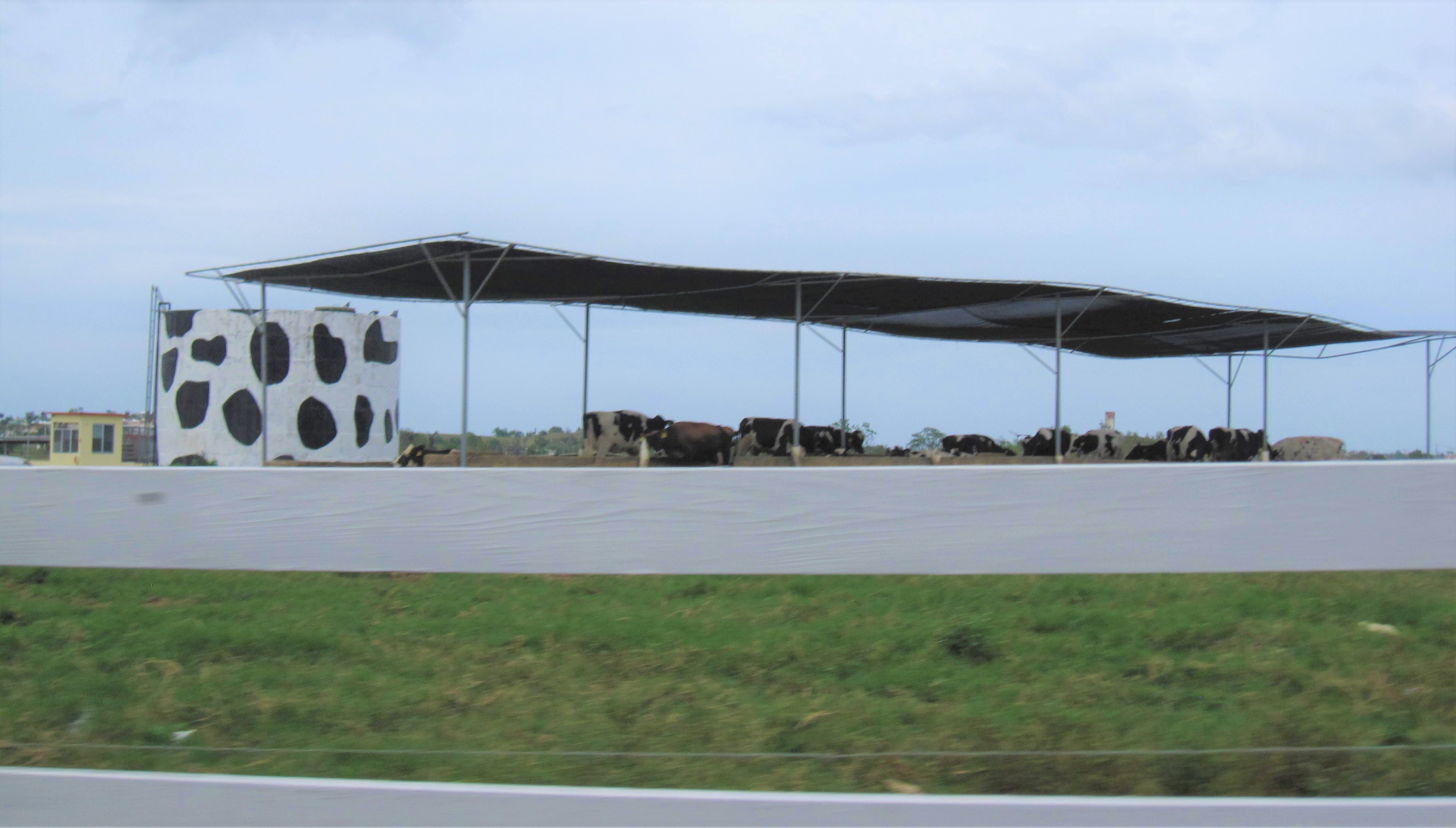
One of many dairy farms located along PR-130

=== Communities served ===
The following are the barrios through which PR-130 passes from north to south:

- Hatillo barrio-pueblo
- Hatillo barrio
- Capáez
- Naranjito
- Buena Vista (northeast corner)
- Corcovado (southwest corner)
- Campo Alegre

== Major intersections ==
The entire route is located in Hatillo.

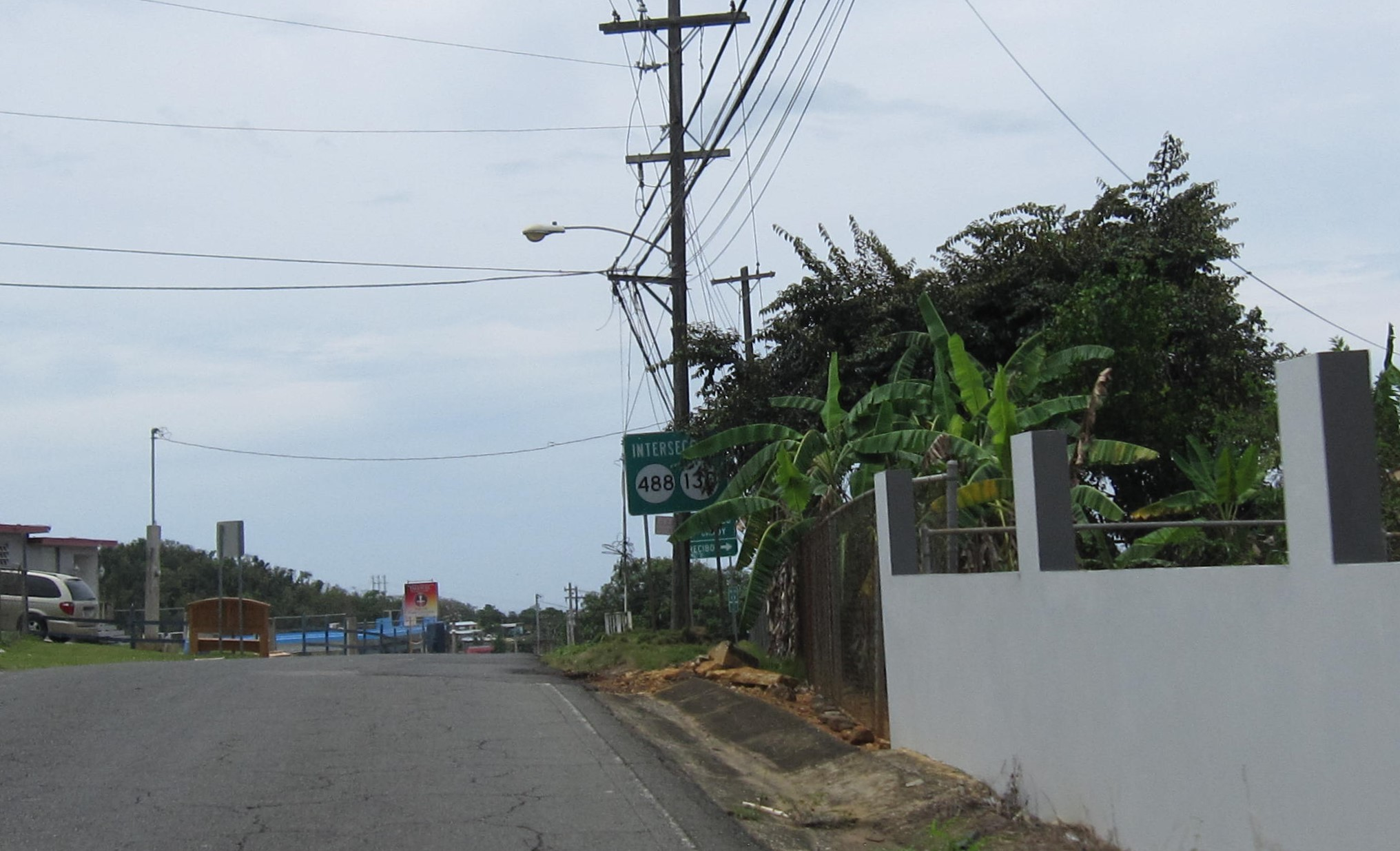
PR-488 and PR-130 junction in Hatillo

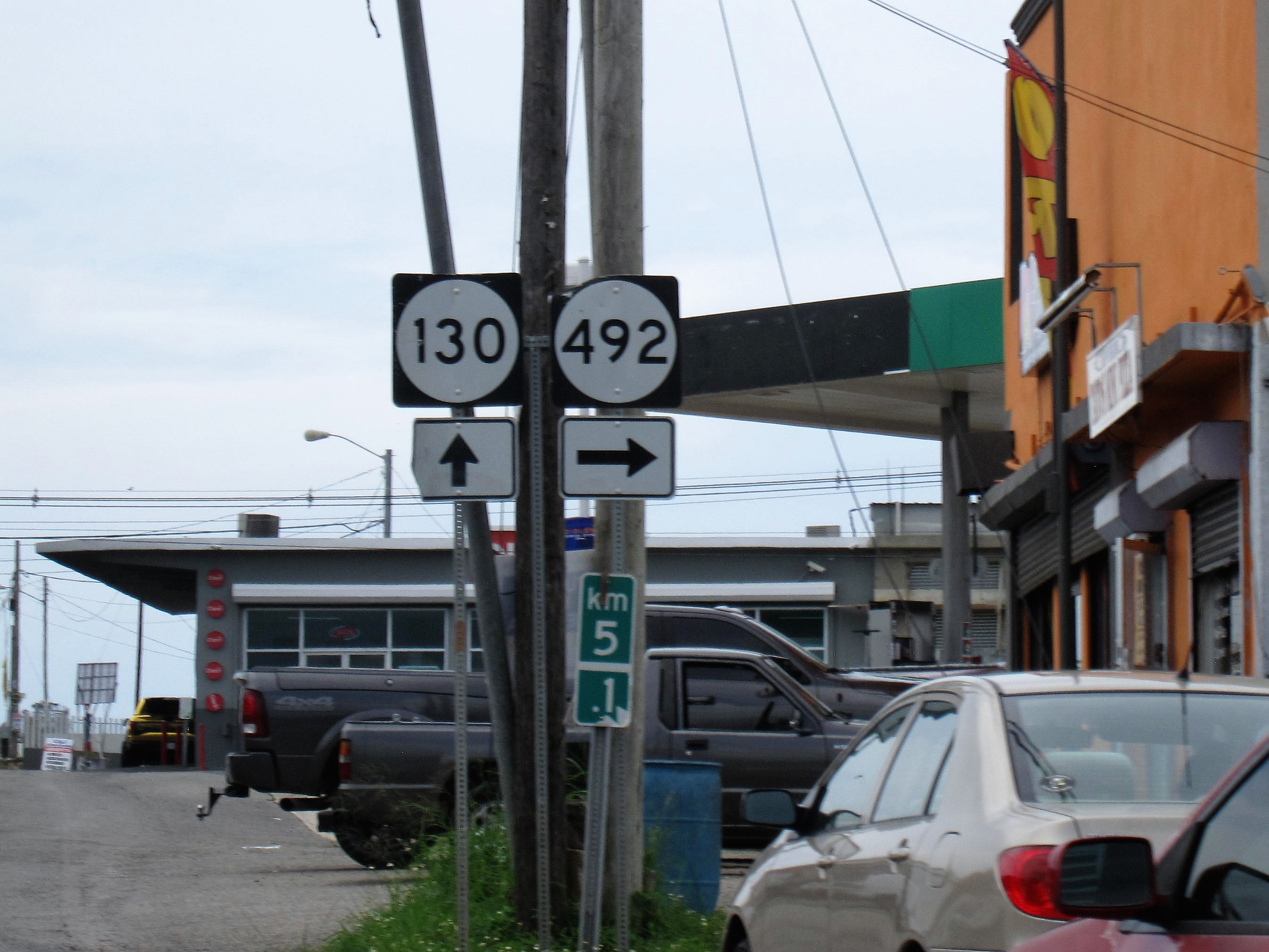
PR-130 north at PR-492 intersection

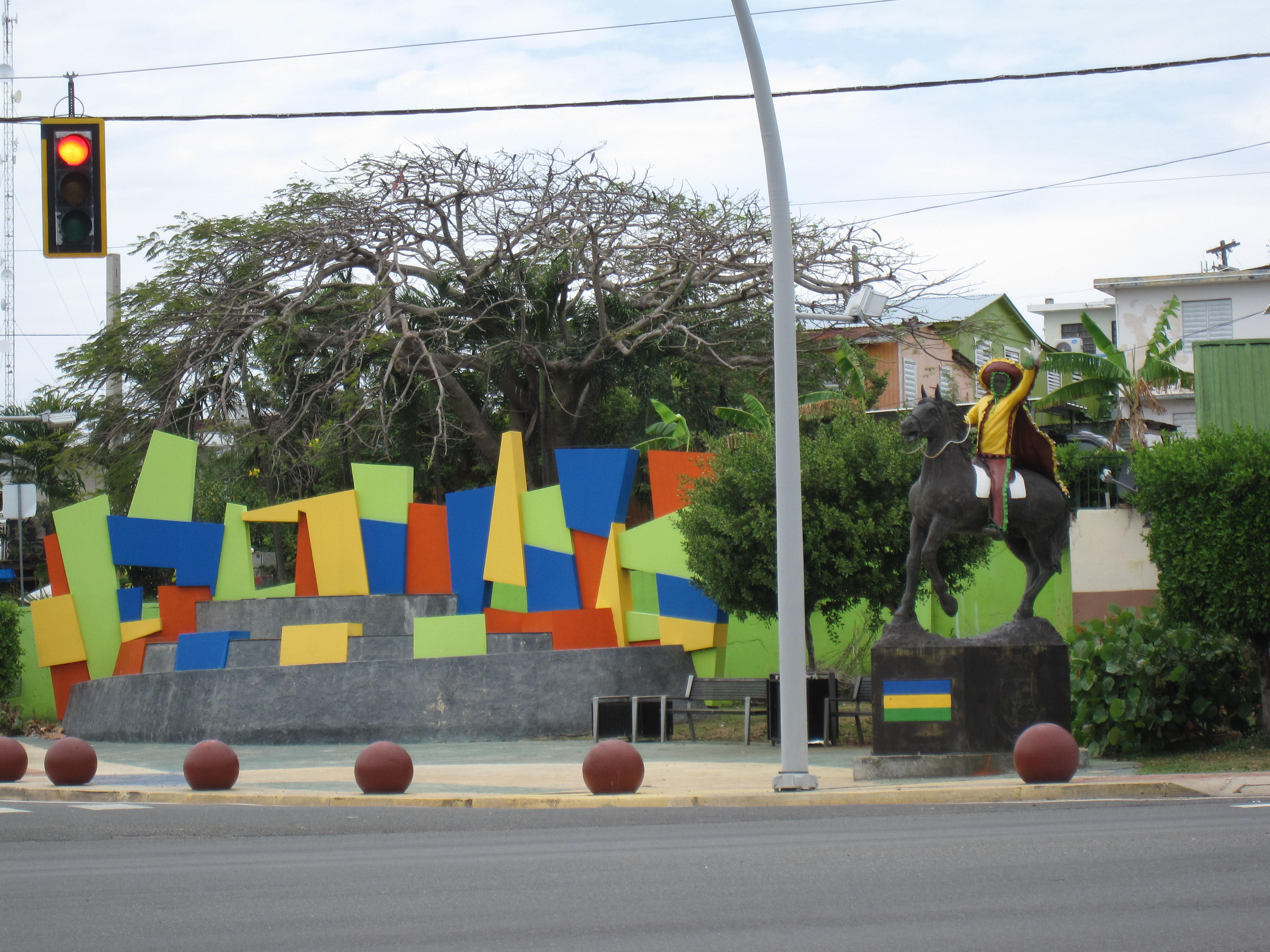
"Hatillo Mask Festival" statue located at downtown entrance

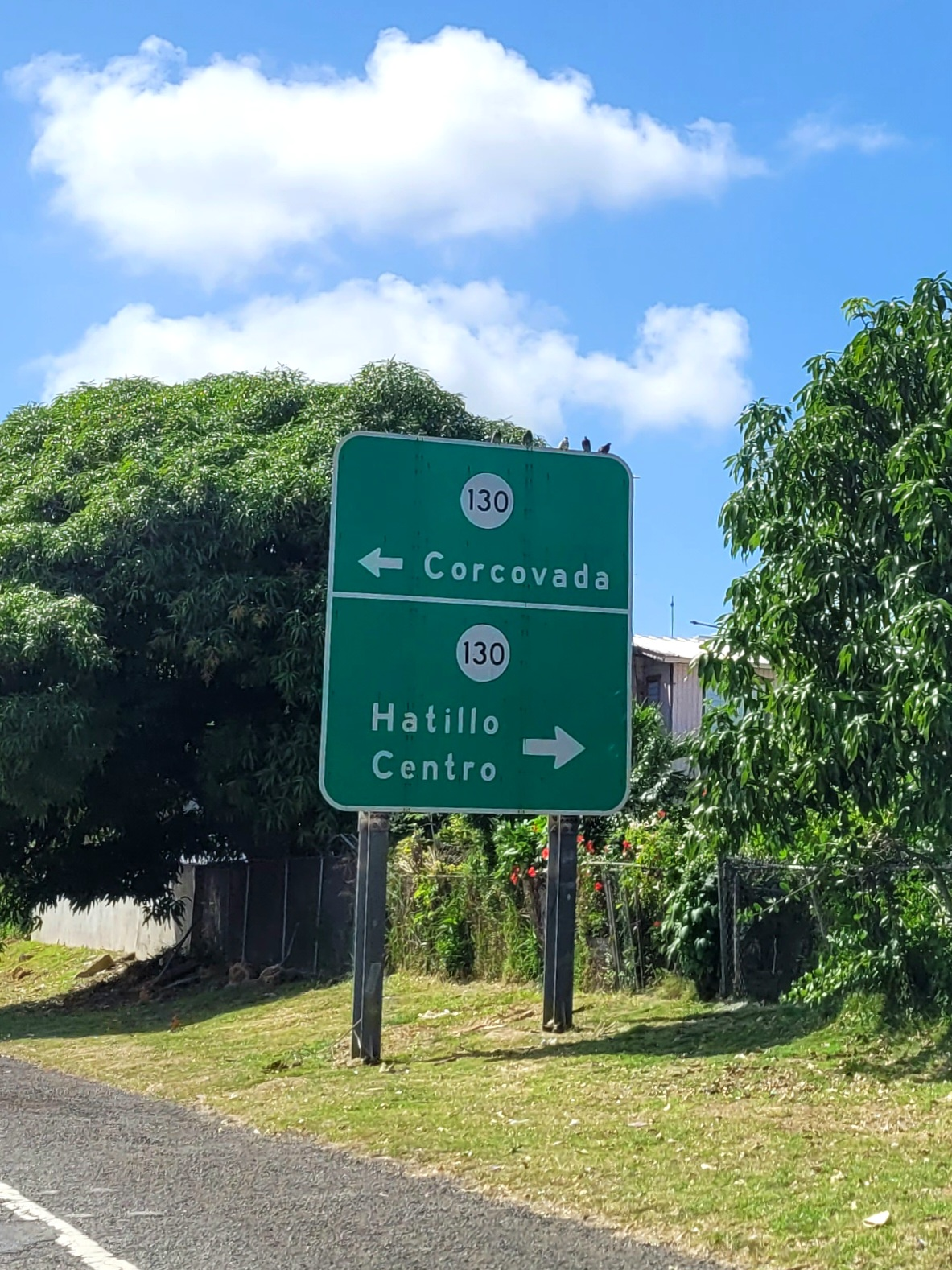
PR-2 west at PR-130 junction in downtown Hatillo

Location	km	mi	Destinations	Notes
Campo Alegre	12.1	7.5	PR-129 (Carretera Mariana Bracetti) – Arecibo, Lares	Southern terminus of PR-130
Buena Vista–Naranjito– Campo Alegre–Corcovado quadripoint	8.7	5.4	PR-490 (Carretera Juan Antonio "Nito" Méndez) – Hato Arriba	
Buena Vista–Naranjito line	8.0	5.0	PR-487 / PR-488 – Buena Vista	
Naranjito	6.2	3.9	PR-491 – Naranjito	
Naranjito–Capáez line	5.0	3.1	PR-492 – Corcovado	
Hatillo barrio-pueblo	0.5	0.31	PR-2 – Arecibo, Mayagüez	
Hatillo barrio-pueblo	0.0	0.0	PR-119 (Avenida Doctor Francisco Susoni) – Hatillo, Camuy	Northern terminus of PR-130
1.000 mi = 1.609 km; 1.000 km = 0.621 mi

== See also ==
- 1953 Puerto Rico highway renumbering
- Carlos Romero Barceló
