= Pablo Medina Velázquez =

Paraguayan investigative journalist

- Born: ca. 1961; Paraguay
- Died: 16 October 2014 (Age 53); Curuguaty, Paraguay
- Cause of death: Gunshot
- Occupations: Journalist, regional correspondent
- Employer: ABC Color
- Known for: investigative journalism into drug trafficking
- Children: Dyrsen Medina
- Family: Salvador Medina Velázquez (brother) and Francisco Medina (brother)

Pablo Medina Velázquez (Note: In this name that follows Hispanic American naming customs, the first or paternal surname is Medina and the second or maternal family name is Velázquez.) (c. 1961 – 16 October 2014) was a Paraguayan investigative journalist for the newspaper ABC Color in Asunción. Medina Velázquez had been returning from a trip to Curuguaty when he was shot and killed due to his investigation into the illegal drug trade in Paraguay. Medina is one of many journalists whose lives have been put at risk due to their involvement into dangerous cases. Medina's death sparked social movements, such as #JusticiaparaPablo on Facebook, as well as memorials in his honour.

== Personal ==
Medina had been working for the company ABC Color, investigating and reporting on drug trafficking in Paraguay. During his investigations, Medina had received death threats because of his closeness to various cases. Medina was not the only person in his family to undergo threats because of dangerous cases. His brother, Salvador Medina Velázquez, was also investigating drug trafficking when he had died thirteen years previously. After Medina's death, seminars and marches were held in Asunción in his honour to remember him and his work.

== Career ==
Pablo Medina Velázquez had been reporting on the drug trade in Paraguay when he was killed during a trip back to Asunción from Curuguaty. Medina is one of many journalists that have attempted to report on drug trafficking in Paraguay.

== Death ==
Curuguaty is located within Paraguay and is shown relative to the capital, Asunción.

Since Medina had been receiving death threats due to his involvement in investigating drug trafficking, he had been assigned police protection. However, he was not under protection when he was shot four times in the chest and face by two gunmen on a motorcycle. Medina's death is recorded as being around 2:30 p.m. on October 16, 2014. Medina was riding with two women, one of whom, his assistant, was also killed during the attack. The third woman, the assistant's sister, survived the attack and was the one who called for help afterwards.

After his death, an investigation into the perpetrators was started, and investigators have since confirmed that it was by order of the mafia running the drug traffic. Although the gunmen are still free, the leader who ordered the murder, Vilmar Neneco Marques, is currently in prison in Brazil.

== Context ==
Drug trafficking in areas of Paraguay is an intense area of investigation and journalism for reporters. Canindeyú itself is cited as being a site of violent land disputes in the past. In particular, the case that Medina was investigating was of a very large marijuana operation in Paraguay. His killing has motivated the justice department in the area to investigate further into the drug trafficking crimes on the rise. The General Secretary of the Union of Journalists of Paraguay (SPP), Santiago Ortiz, came out and said that Paraguayan society was living in a state of narco-politics that will eventually destroy the social base of Paraguay. Thus, it was important that the country look at these cases and attempt to further stop them.

== Impact ==
Medina's killing due to his investigation came amidst a dangerous time for Paraguayan journalists. Other journalists who were investigating the country's drug trade as well as judicial corruption, Fausto Gabriel Alcaraz and Edgar Pantaleon Fernández Fleitas, respectively, were killed in Paraguay that same year. The executive director of the New York-based Committee to Protect Journalists, Joel Simon, has come out and said that journalists are unquestionably under greater threat than ever.

== Reactions ==
The Director-General of UNESCO, Irina Bokova, has spoken about her deep concern over the killing of Median Velázquez and his assistants. She says that it is important that the people who executed this attack be brought to justice, not only because of criminality but also to deter future killings against journalists.

Paraguayan President Horacio Cartes was also quick to condemn the killing after it happened. He issued a statement shortly afterwards, citing the attack as threatening the peace of Paraguay as well as a violation of human rights and freedom of expression.

== See also ==
- Human rights in Paraguay
