= Maria Medina =

Maria Medina may refer to:

- Maria Medina (Viganò) (1769–1821), an Austrian ballet dancer
- Maria Medina (archer) (born 1948), Puerto Rican archer
- Maria Medina Coeli (1764–1846), Italian scientist
- María Elena Medina-Mora Icaza (born 1951), Mexican psychologist and researcher
- Maria do Carmo Medina (1925–2014), Portuguese-born Angolan human rights defender
