= Illegal drug trade in Paraguay =

The illegal drug trade in Paraguay is significant in both production of cannabis and trans-shipment of cocaine. In 2011 the United Nations reported that it was the largest cannabis producer in South America, accounting for 15 per cent of world cannabis production. It was also responsible for 30-40 tons of cocaine trans-shipment annually.

== History ==
Under President Alfredo Stroessner's dictatorship (1954 - 1989), Paraguay is said to have become "a sanctuary for smugglers in arms, drugs and everyday goods such as whiskey and car parts," and Stroessner provided refuge to heroin dealer Auguste Ricord.

In 1994 General Ramón Rosa Rodríguez, the head of Paraguay's national anti-drugs agency, Secretaría Nacional Antidrogas (SENAD), was assassinated whilst delivering a report to President Juan Carlos Wasmosy. The report, which went missing, is said to have implicated ex-President Andrés Rodríguez, then a Senator, as "the chief drug kingpin in Paraguay".

== Dynamics ==
The border region with Brazil around Pedro Juan Caballero, in Amambay Department, is one hotspot for drug smuggling, with the Brazilian crime organizations Comando Vermelho and Primeiro Comando da Capital given as prime targets for Paraguayan anti-drugs operations in 2011.

== See also ==
- Crime in Paraguay
- Cannabis in Paraguay
