= Buena Vista, Hatillo, Puerto Rico =

Barrio of Puerto Rico

Buena Vista
- Barrio
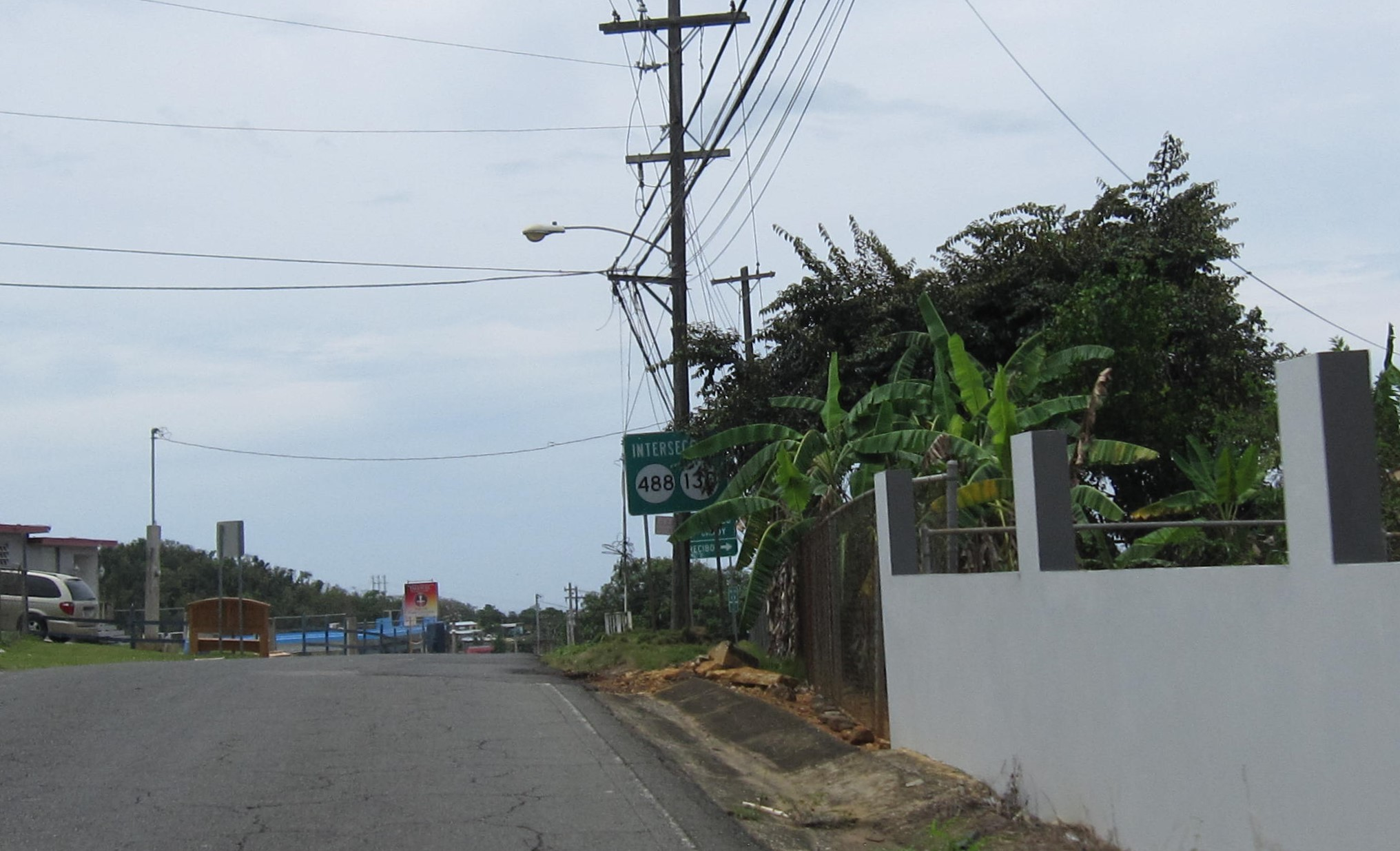
- PR-487 near PR-488 and PR-130

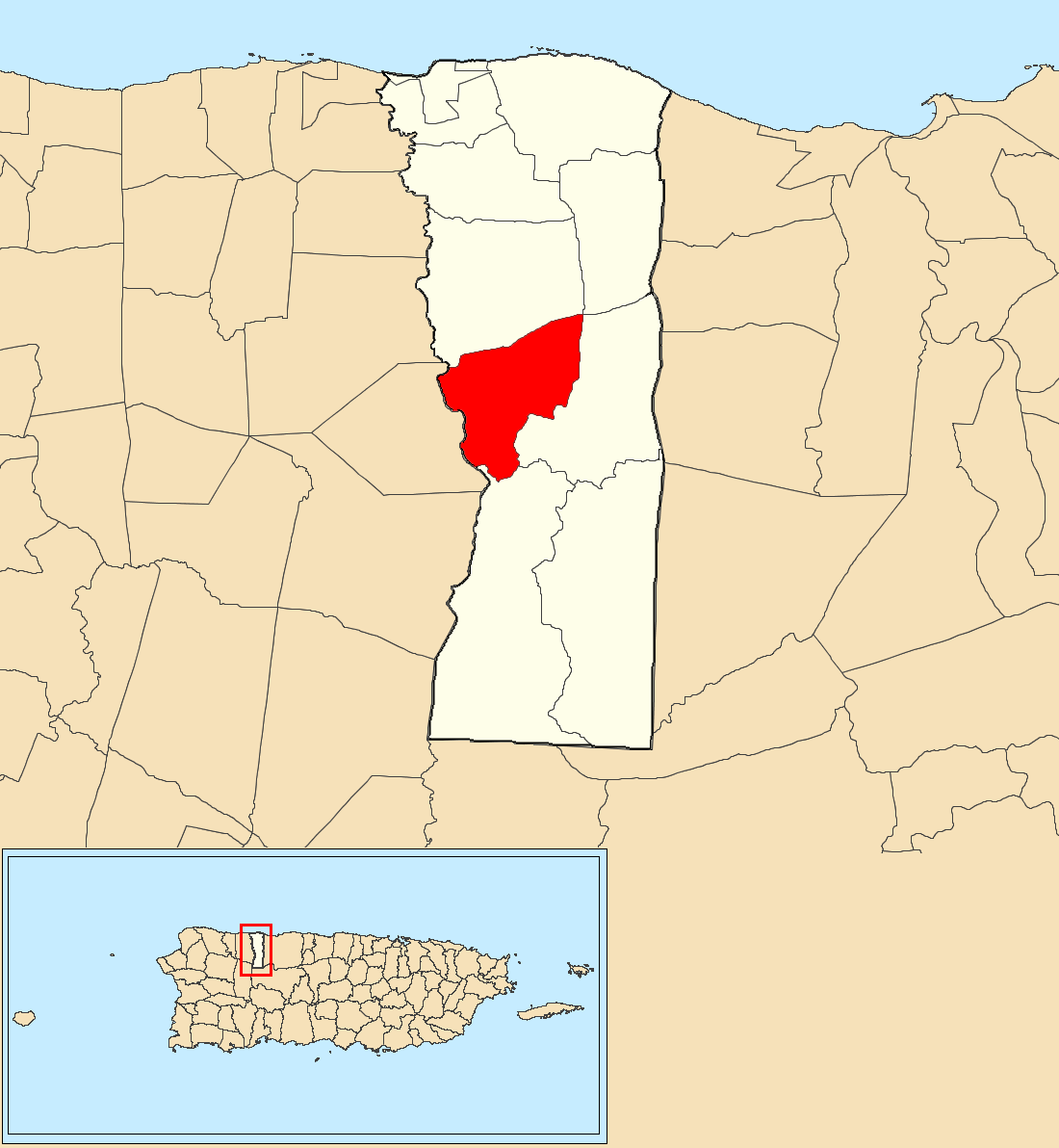
- Location of Buena Vista within the municipality of Hatillo shown in red

- Location of Puerto Rico
- Coordinates: 18°24′24″N 66°48′33″W
- Commonwealth: Puerto Rico
- Municipality: Hatillo

Area
  - Total: 3.55 sq mi (9.2 km^{2})
  - Land: 3.55 sq mi (9.2 km^{2})
  - Water: 0 sq mi (0 km^{2})
- Elevation: 551 ft (168 m)

Population (2010)
  - Total: 2,490
  - Density: 701.4/sq mi (270.8/km^{2})
- Source: 2010 Census
- Time zone: UTC−4 (AST)

Buena Vista is a rural barrio in the municipality of Hatillo, Puerto Rico. Its population in 2010 was 2,490.

Historical population
Census	Pop.	Note	%±
1900	963		—
1910	881		−8.5%
1920	1,225		39.0%
1930	1,448		18.2%
1940	1,686		16.4%
1950	1,015		−39.8%
1960	946		−6.8%
1970	873		−7.7%
1980	2,034		133.0%
1990	2,131		4.8%
2000	2,279		6.9%
2010	2,490		9.3%
U.S. Decennial Census; 1899 (shown as 1900) 1910-1930; 1930-1950 1980-2000 2010

== See also ==
- List of communities in Puerto Rico
