= Puerto Rico Highway 487 =

Highway in Puerto Rico

Highway 487
- Ruta 487

Route information
- Maintained by Puerto Rico DTPW
- Length: 8.7 km (5.4 mi)
- Existed: 1953–present

Major junctions
- South end: PR-129 in Bayaney
- North end: PR-130 / PR-488 in Buena Vista–Naranjito

Location
- Country: United States
- Territory: Puerto Rico
- Municipalities: Hatillo

Highway system
- Roads in Puerto Rico; List
← PR-462	→ PR-500

Puerto Rico Highway 487 (PR-487) is a north–south road located entirely in the municipality of Hatillo, Puerto Rico. With a length of 8.7 kilometers (5.4 mi), it begins at its intersection with PR-130 and PR-488 on the Naranjito–Buena Vista line, and ends at its junction with PR-129 in Bayaney barrio.

Puerto Rico Highway 487

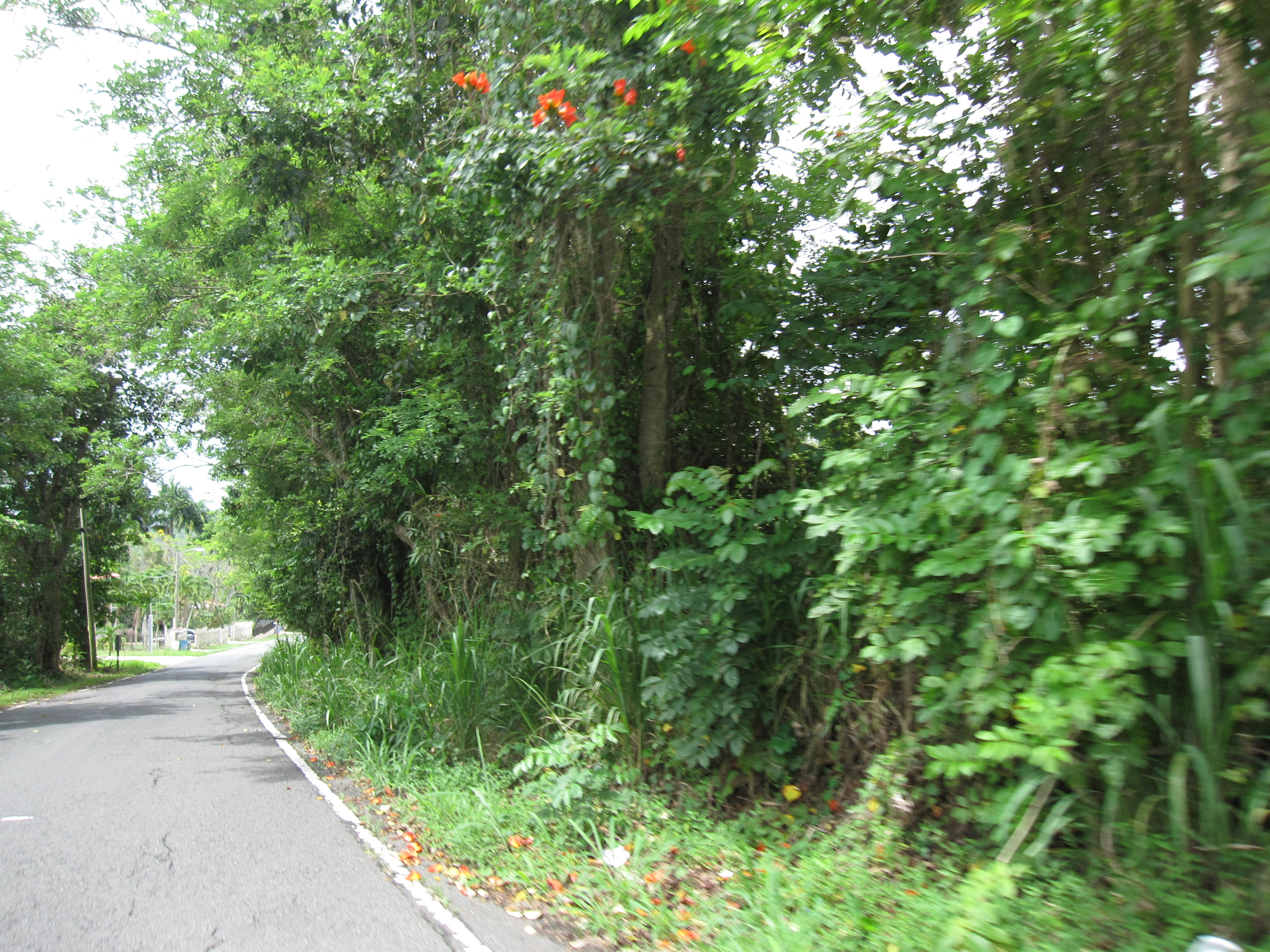
Traveling south to north

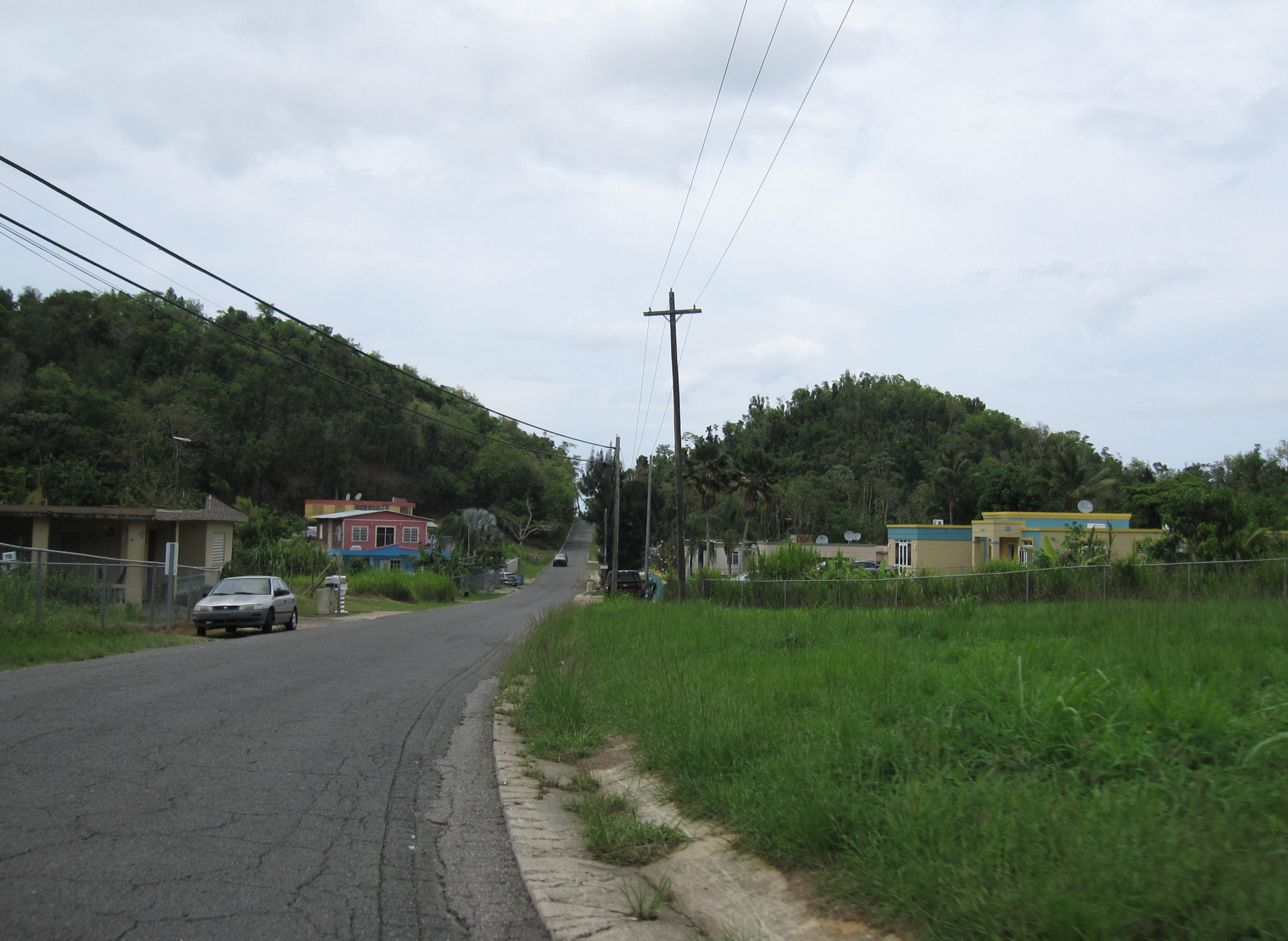
Traveling south to north

== Major intersections ==
The entire route is located in Hatillo.

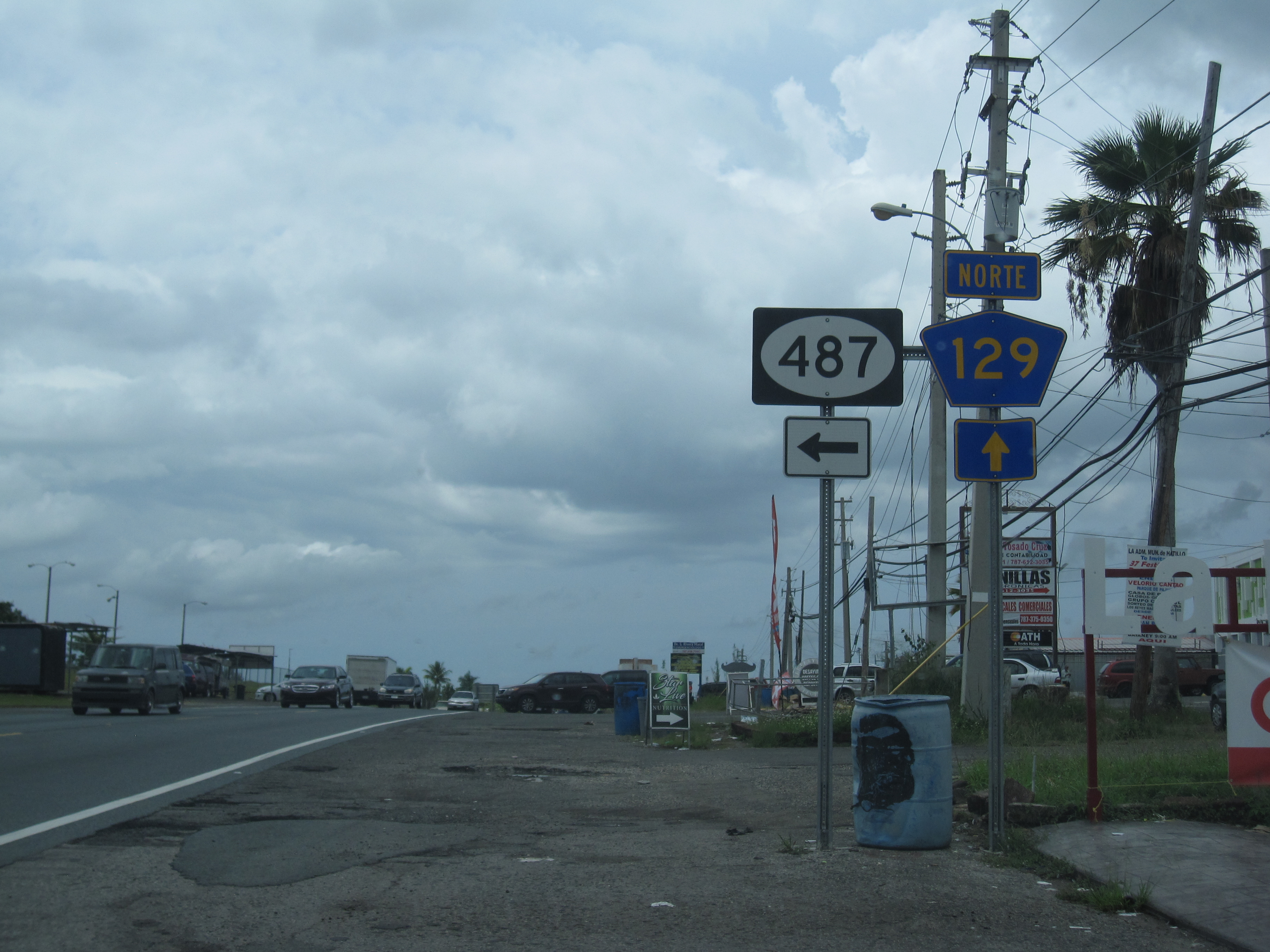
PR-129 north at PR-487 intersection in Bayaney barrio

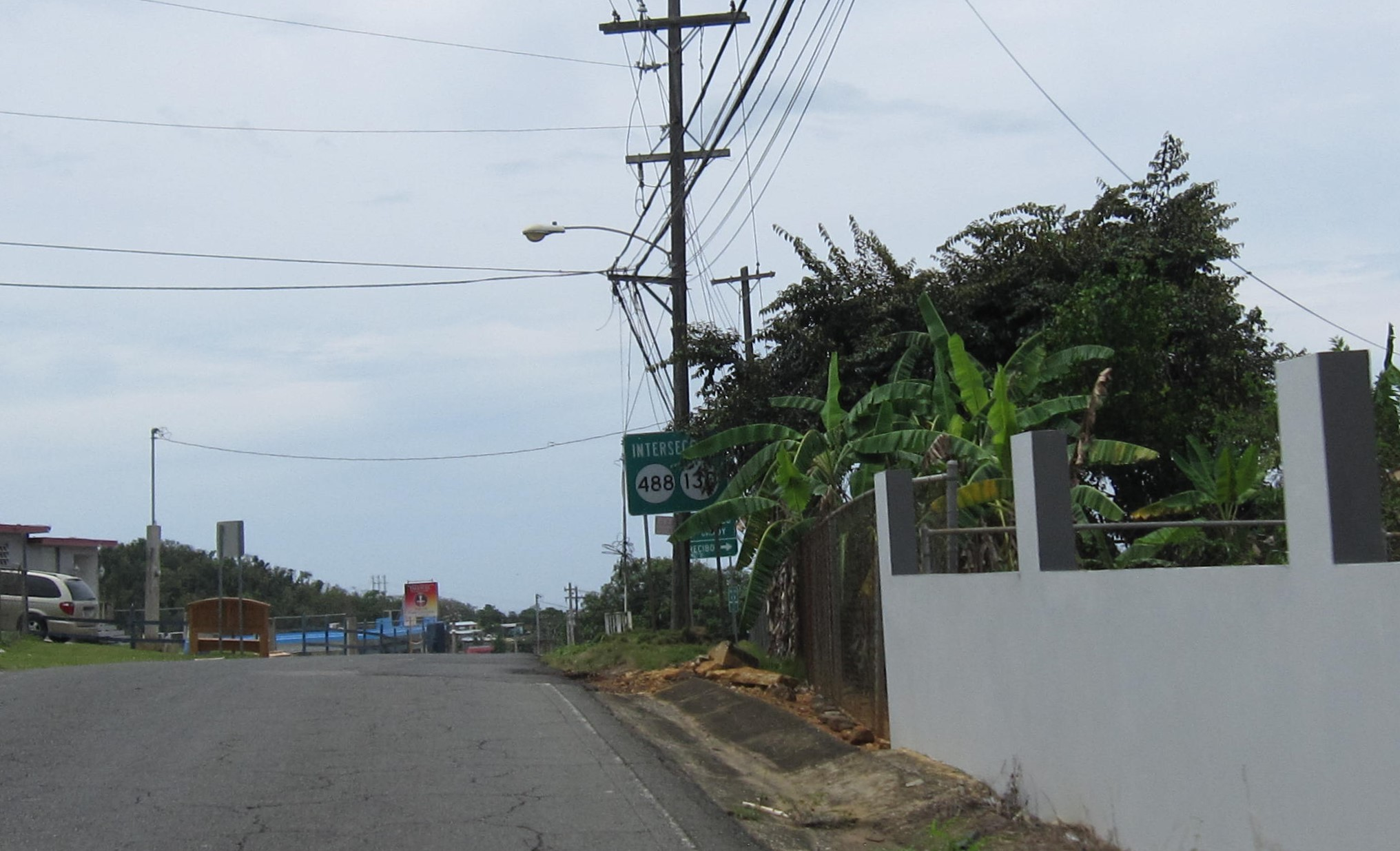
PR-487 north approaching PR-130 and PR-488 intersection

Location	km	mi	Destinations	Notes
Bayaney	8.7	5.4	PR-129 (Carretera Mariana Bracetti) – Lares, Arecibo	Southern terminus of PR-487
Buena Vista–Naranjito line	0.0	0.0	PR-130 (Carretera Carlos Romero Barceló) / PR-488 – Hatillo, Arecibo	Northern terminus of PR-487
1.000 mi = 1.609 km; 1.000 km = 0.621 mi

== See also ==
- 1953 Puerto Rico highway renumbering
