= Naranjito, Hatillo, Puerto Rico =

Barrio of Puerto Rico

Naranjito
- Barrio
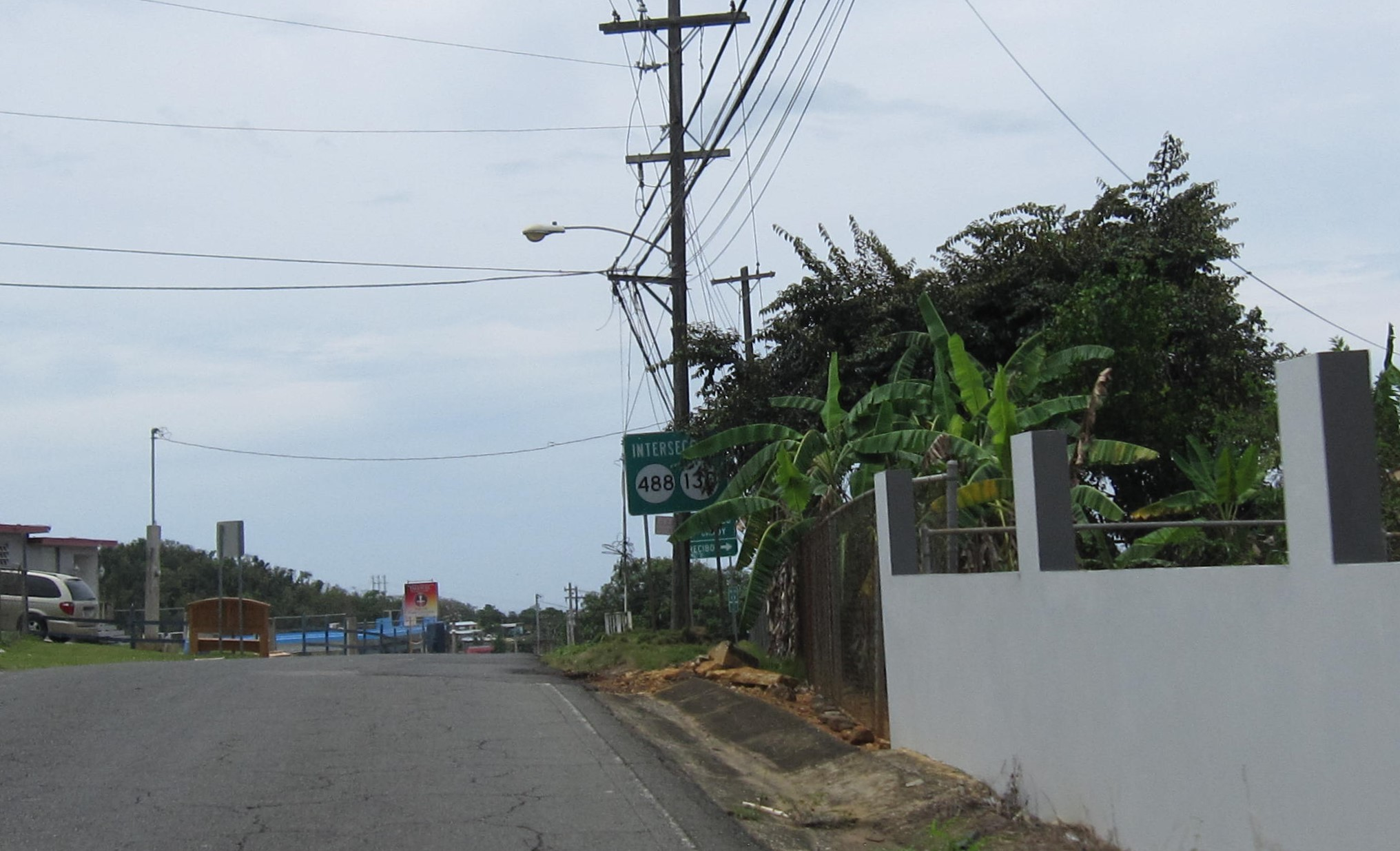
- On PR-487 near PR-488 and PR-130

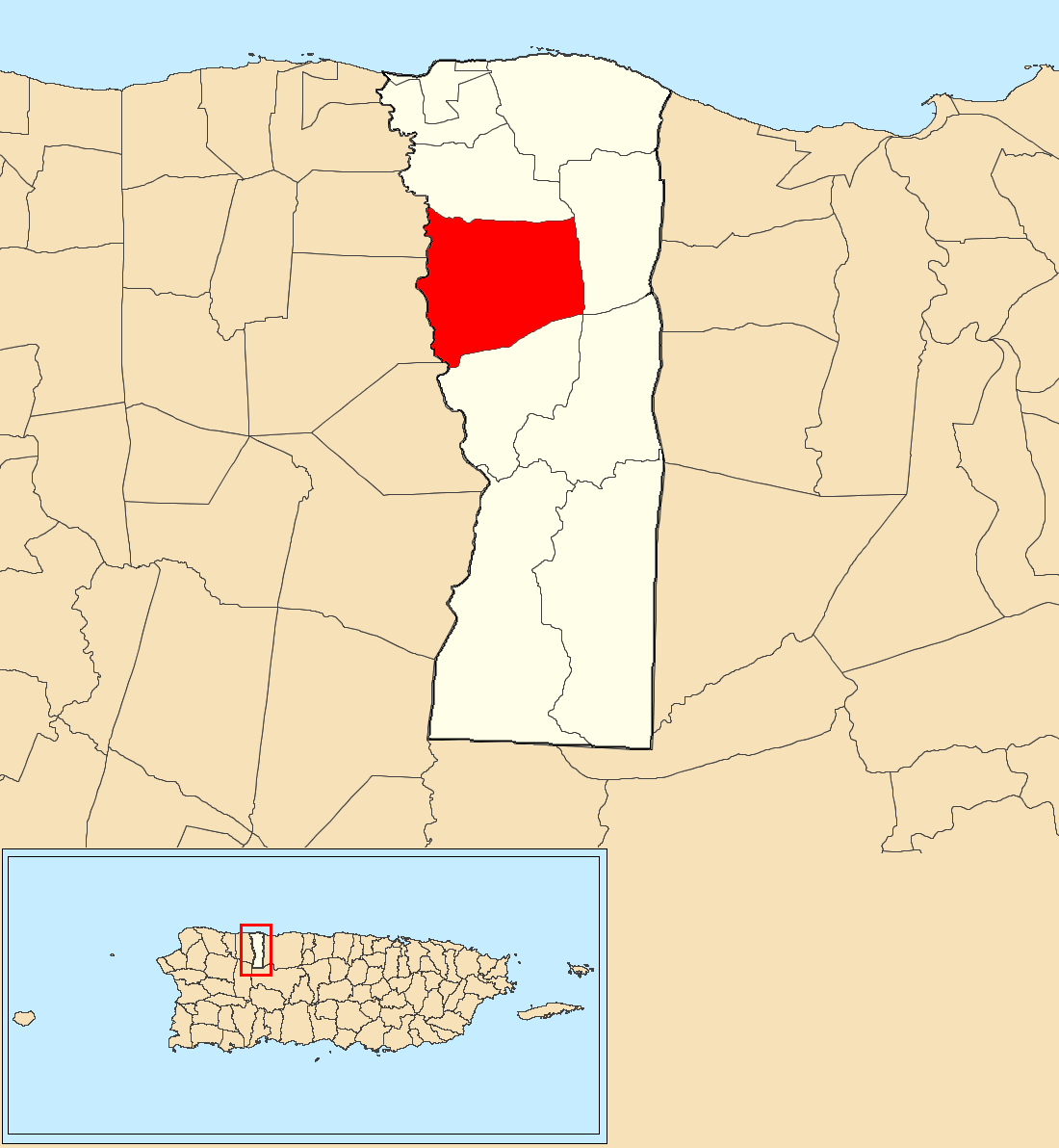
- Location of Naranjito within the municipality of Hatillo shown in red

- Location of Puerto Rico
- Coordinates: 18°26′35″N 66°48′37″W
- Commonwealth: Puerto Rico
- Municipality: Hatillo

Area
  - Total: 5.14 sq mi (13.3 km^{2})
  - Land: 5.13 sq mi (13.3 km^{2})
  - Water: 0.01 sq mi (0.026 km^{2})
- Elevation: 381 ft (116 m)

Population (2010)
  - Total: 4,050
  - Density: 789.5/sq mi (304.8/km^{2})
- Source: 2010 Census
- Time zone: UTC−4 (AST)

Naranjito is a rural barrio in the municipality of Hatillo, Puerto Rico. Its population in 2010 was 4,050.

Historical population
Census	Pop.	Note	%±
1900	966		—
1910	927		−4.0%
1920	1,378		48.7%
1930	1,557		13.0%
1940	1,809		16.2%
1950	2,686		48.5%
1960	2,110		−21.4%
1970	2,229		5.6%
1980	2,821		26.6%
1990	3,160		12.0%
2000	3,630		14.9%
2010	4,050		11.6%
U.S. Decennial Census; 1899 (shown as 1900) 1910-1930; 1930-1950 1980-2000 2010

== History ==
Naranjito was in Spain's gazetteers until Puerto Rico was ceded by Spain in the aftermath of the Spanish–American War under the terms of the Treaty of Paris of 1898 and became an unincorporated territory of the United States. In 1899, the United States Department of War conducted a census of Puerto Rico finding that the population of Naranjito barrio was 966.

== Gallery ==
On PR-130 in and around Naranjito, Hatillo:

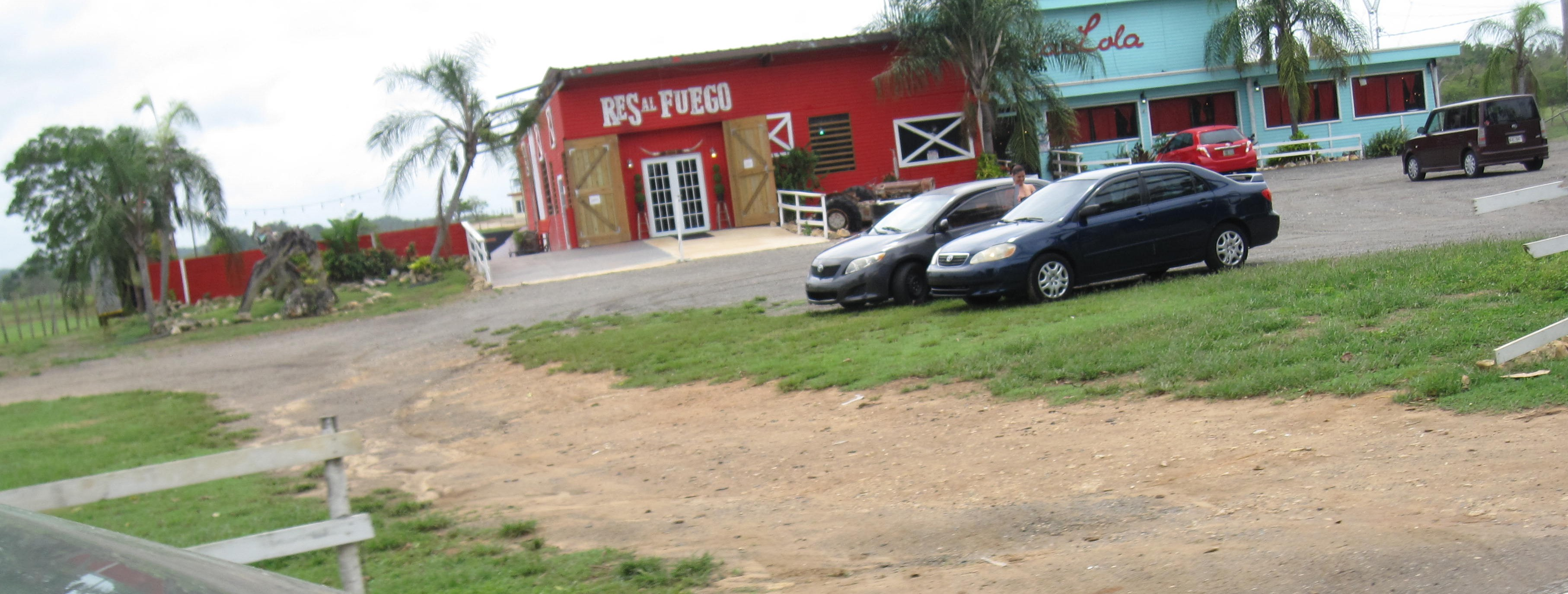

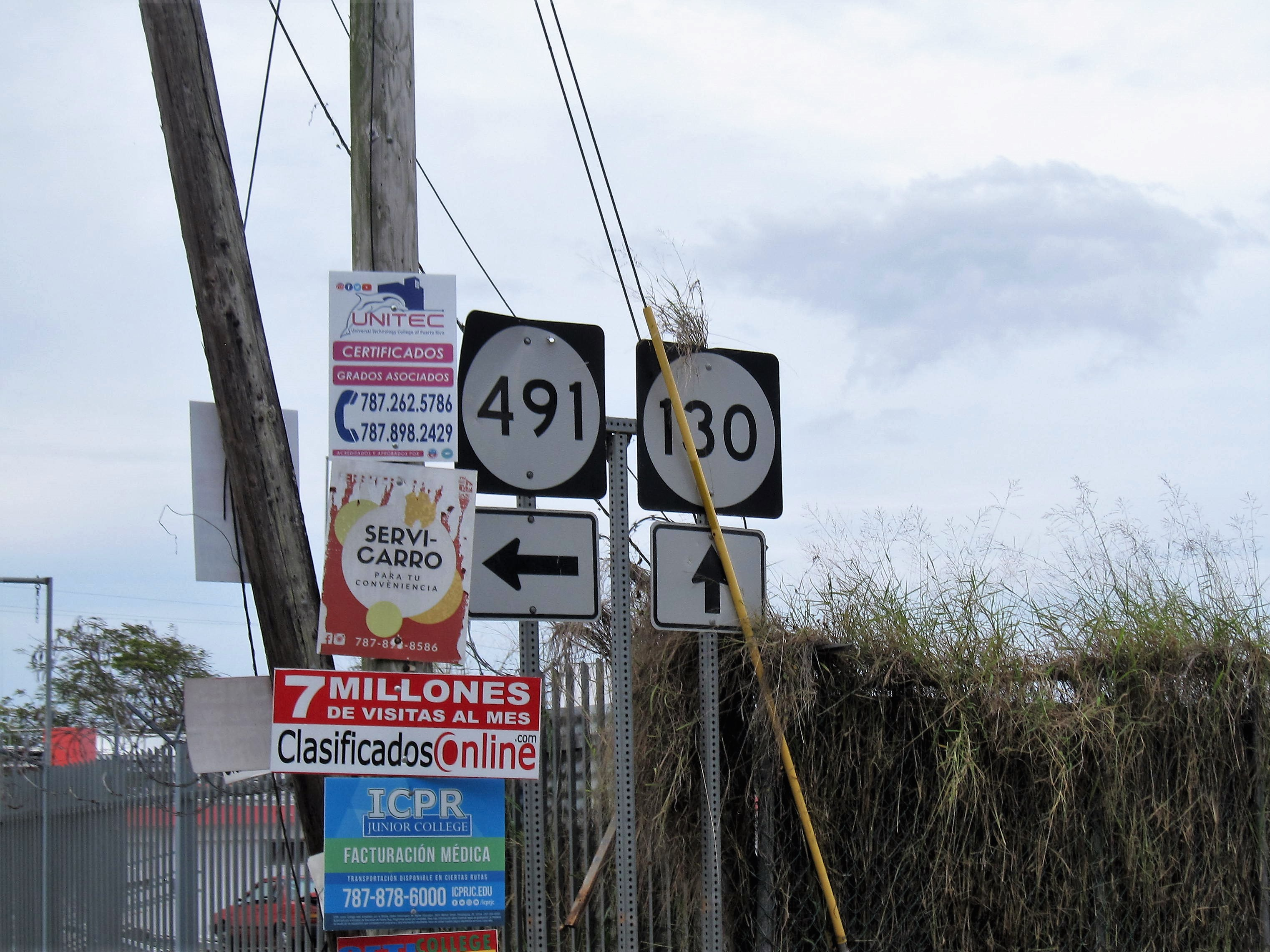

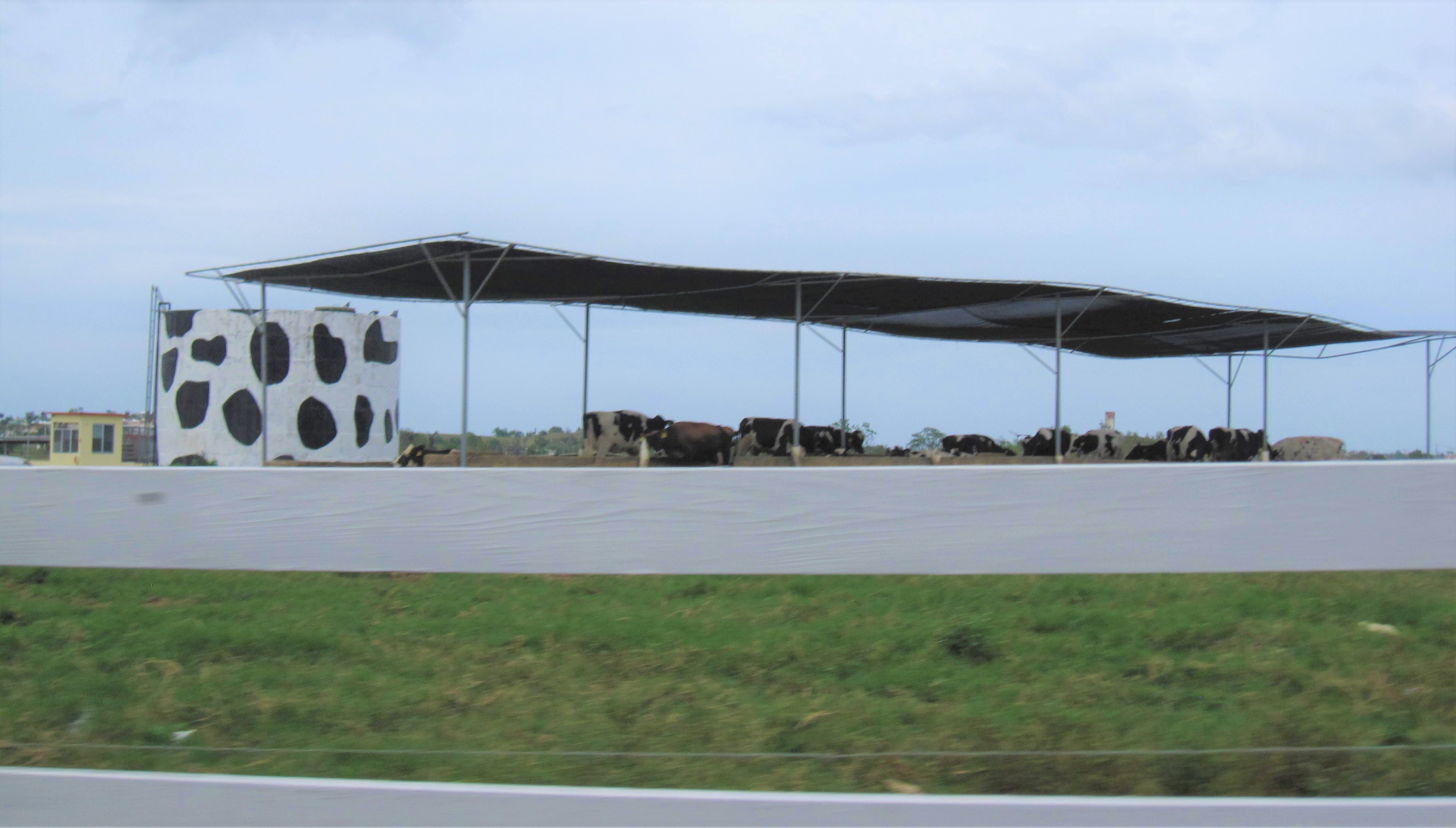

== See also ==
- List of communities in Puerto Rico
