= Antonio Medina =

Antonio Medina may refer to:

- Antonio Medina y Céspedes (1824–1885), Afro-Cuban poet and playwright
- Antonio Medina Comas (born c. 1969), executive director of the Puerto Rico Industrial Development Company
- Antonio Medina (footballer) (born 1984), Argentine footballer
- Antonio Medina García (1919–2003), Spanish chess International Master
- Antonio Medina Molera (born 1952), Spanish theologian, historian and author
