= José Medina =

José Medina may refer to:

- Jose Medina (born 1953), American educator and politician
- José Medina (Brazilian filmmaker) (1894–1980), Brazilian director and writer, known for Carlitinhos, Do Rio a São Paulo Para Casar, and Perversidade
- José Medina (cyclist) (born 1973), Chilean track and road cyclist
- José Medina (philosopher), American philosopher
- José Medina (sport shooter) (born 1942), Filipino sports shooter and Olympian
- José Medina (swimmer) (born 1965), Mexican swimmer
- José Medina (weightlifter) (born 1970), Venezuelan weightlifter
- José María Medina (1826–1878), temporarily President of Honduras
- José Ramón Medina (1921–2010), Venezuelan lawyer, writer, poet, and politician
- José Toribio Medina (1852–1930), Chilean bibliographer, writer, and historian
