= Juan Medina =

Juan Medina may refer to:

- Juan Antonio Medina (born 1946), former Spanish handball player
- Juan Carlos Medina (born 1983), Mexican footballer
- Juan José Medina, former President of Paraguay
- Juan Pablo Medina (born 1976), American actor
- Juan Medina Herrad (born 1992), Dominican boxer
- Juan de Medina (1490–1547), Spanish theologian and Spain's ambassador to Rome

== See also ==
- Juan Manuel Abal Medina (born 1945), Argentine journalist and politician
- Juan Manuel Abal Medina Jr. (born 1968), Argentine academic and politician
