= Thiago Medina =

Brazilian politician (born 2003)

Member of the Chamber of Deputies
- Incumbent
- Assumed office 1 February 2027
- Constituency: Pernambuco

Personal details
- Born: 16 April 2003 (age 23)
- Party: Liberal Party

Thiago Medina Duarte (born 16 April 2003) is a Brazilian politician who was elected member of the Chamber of Deputies in 2026. He has been a member of the Municipal Chamber of Recife since 2025.
