= Corcovado, Hatillo, Puerto Rico =

Barrio of Puerto Rico

Corcovado
- Barrio
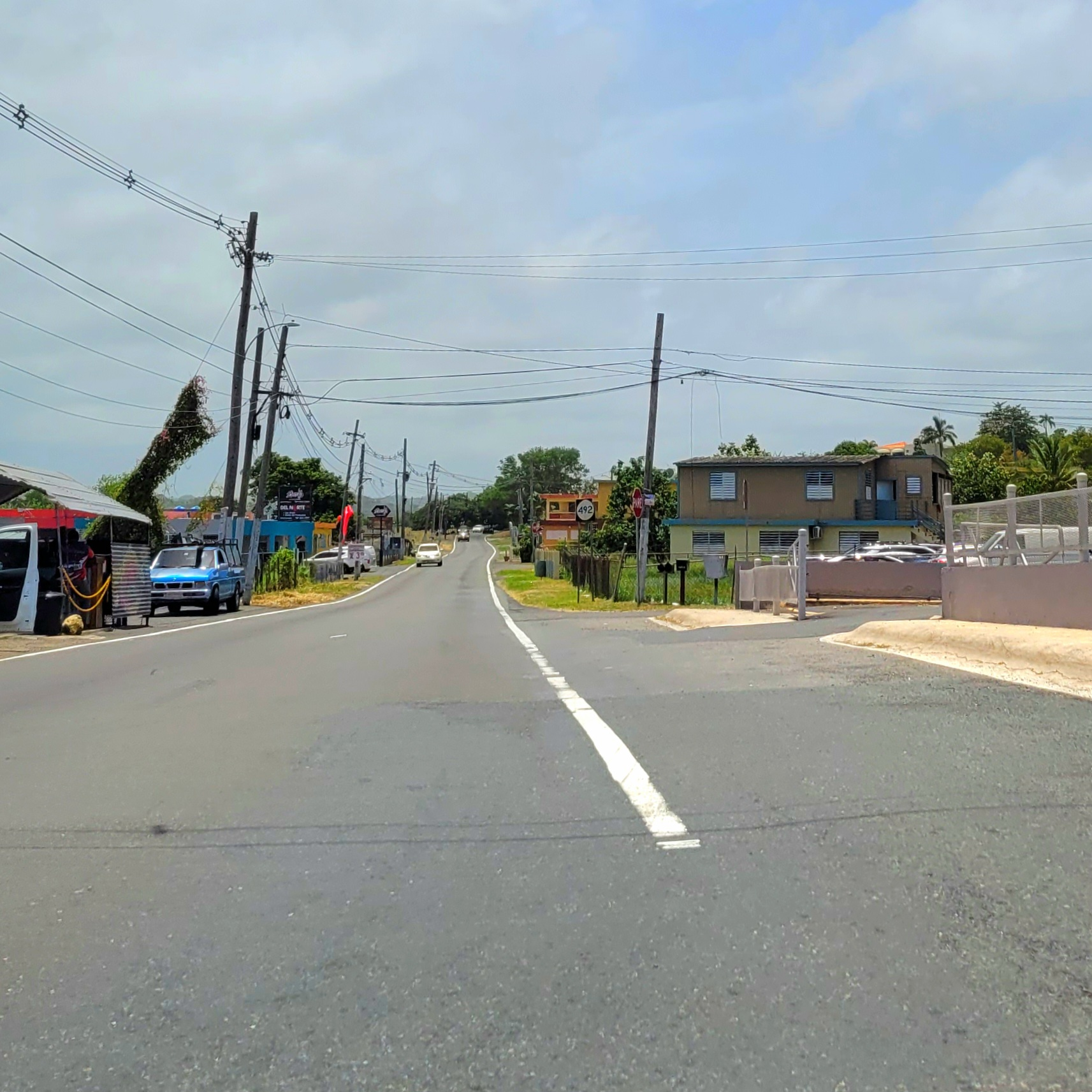
- Puerto Rico Highway 492 in Corcovado

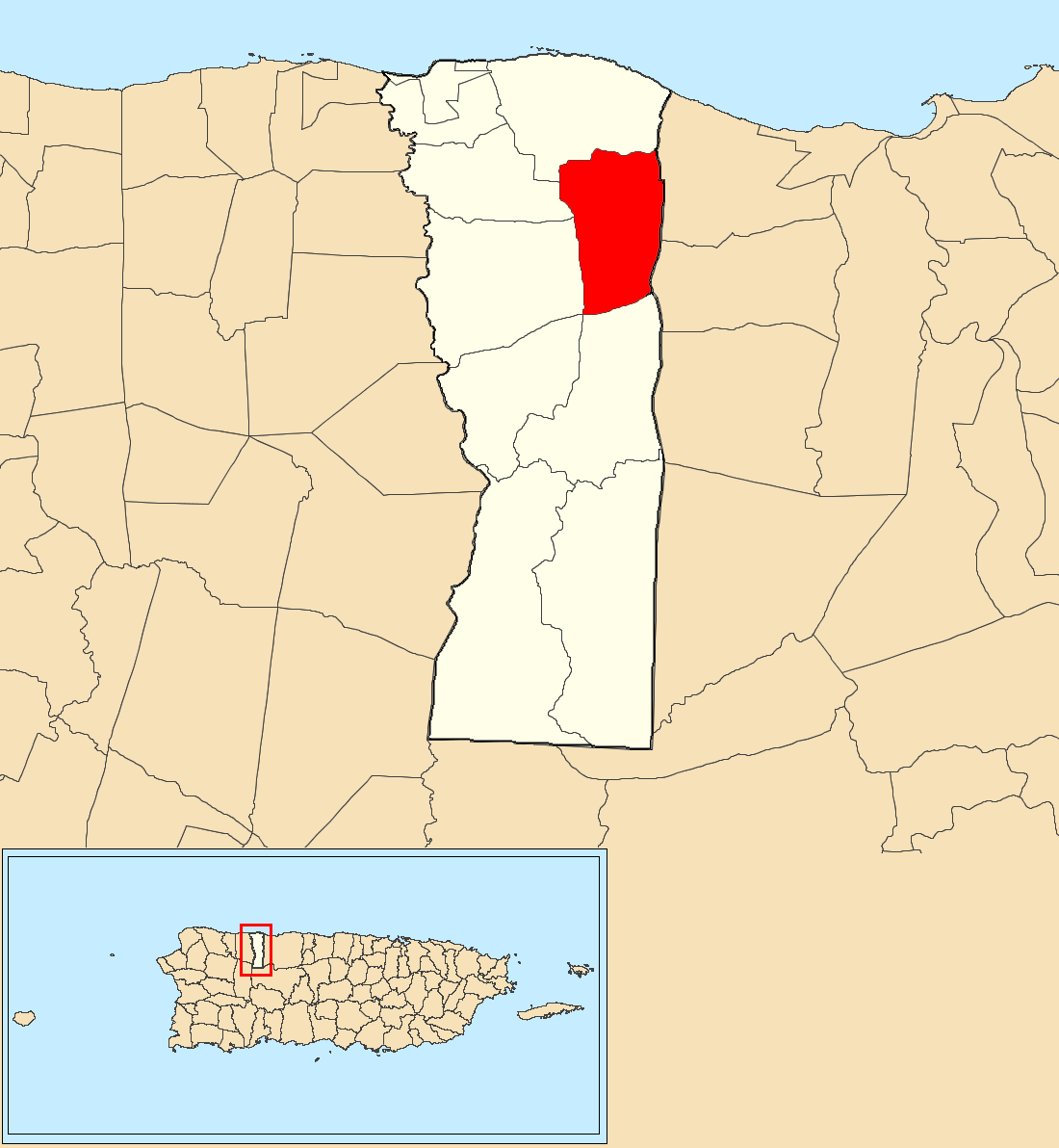
- Location of Corcovado within the municipality of Hatillo shown in red

- Location of Puerto Rico
- Coordinates: 18°26′47″N 66°46′56″W
- Commonwealth: Puerto Rico
- Municipality: Hatillo

Area
  - Total: 3.61 sq mi (9.3 km^{2})
  - Land: 3.60 sq mi (9.3 km^{2})
  - Water: 0.01 sq mi (0.026 km^{2})
- Elevation: 217 ft (66 m)

Population (2010)
  - Total: 4,617
  - Density: 1,282.5/sq mi (495.2/km^{2})
- Source: 2010 Census
- Time zone: UTC−4 (AST)

Corcovado is a rural barrio in the municipality of Hatillo, Puerto Rico. Its population in 2010 was 4,617.

Historical population
Census	Pop.	Note	%±
1900	1,065		—
1910	1,105		3.8%
1920	1,320		19.5%
1930	1,288		−2.4%
1940	1,518		17.9%
1950	1,619		6.7%
1960	1,430		−11.7%
1970	2,083		45.7%
1980	2,815		35.1%
1990	3,532		25.5%
2000	4,064		15.1%
2010	4,617		13.6%
U.S. Decennial Census; 1899 (shown as 1900) 1910-1930; 1930-1950 1980-2000 2010

== History ==
Corcovado was in Spain's gazetteers until Puerto Rico was ceded by Spain in the aftermath of the Spanish–American War under the terms of the Treaty of Paris of 1898 and became an unincorporated territory of the United States. In 1899, the United States Department of War conducted a census of Puerto Rico finding that the population of Corcovado barrio was 1,065.

== Gallery ==
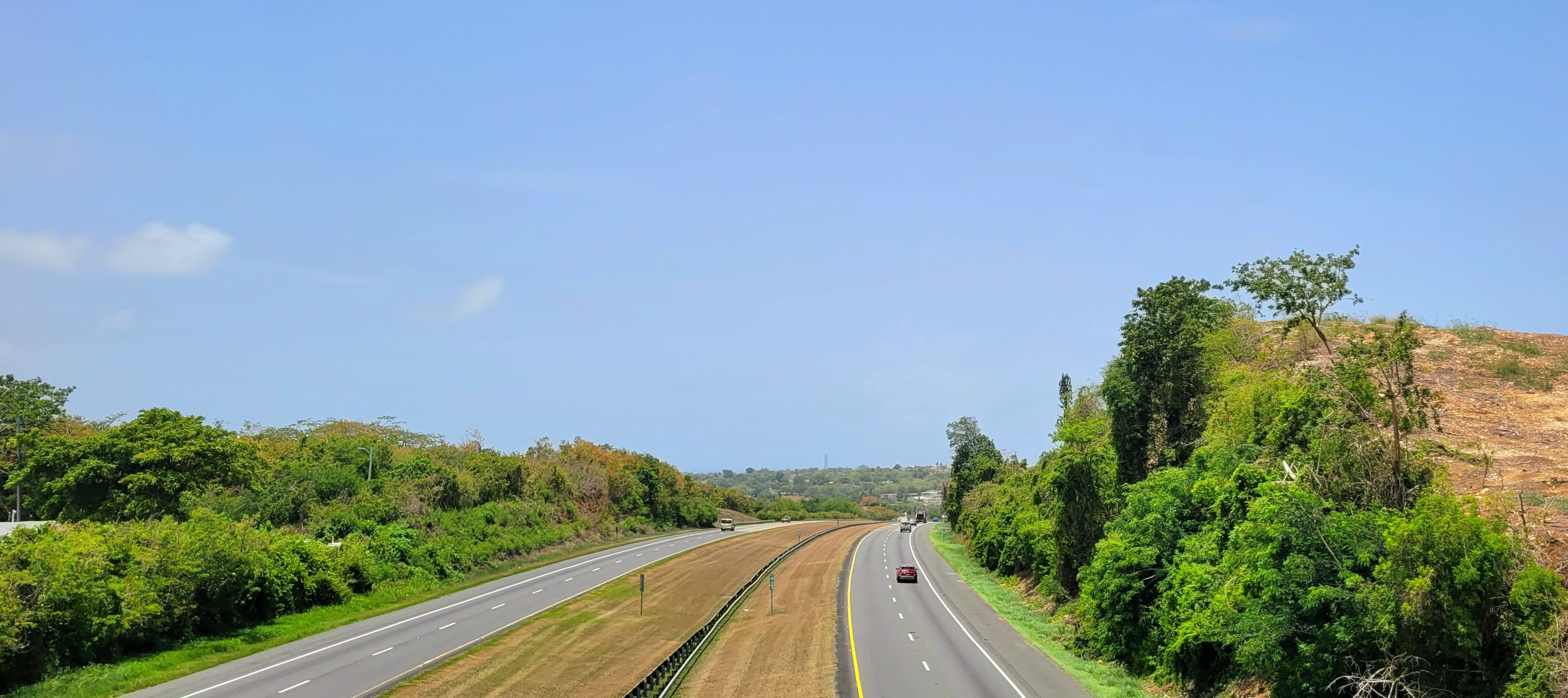
Puerto Rico Highway 22 in Corcovado

== See also ==
- List of communities in Puerto Rico
