= Luis Medina =

Luis Medina may refer to:

- Luis Medina (athlete) (born 1952), Cuban middle-distance runner
- Luis Medina (designated hitter) (born 1963), American baseball designated hitter and first baseman
- Luis Medina (pitcher) (born 1999), Dominican Republic baseball pitcher
- Luis Medina (swimmer) (born 1973), Bolivian swimmer
- Luis Caicedo Medina (born 1992), Ecuadorian footballer
- Luis Manuel Medina (1968–2017), Dominican broadcast journalist
- Luis Medina Cantalejo (born 1964), Spanish football referee
