= Antonio Medina Comas =

Puerto Rican politician (born 1968)

Antonio Luis Medina Comas (born c. 1968) is a licensed industrial engineer, a business executive, and the current president and founder of Convergent Strategies, an advisory firm that helps companies accelerate their growth. Medina has a bachelor's and a master's degree in industrial engineering from Rensselaer Polytechnic Institute, and an MBA in finance from the Wharton School at the University of Pennsylvania. He served as the executive director of the Puerto Rico Industrial Development Company, PRIDCO, between 2013 and 2016. Before joining PRIDCO, Medina spent 20 years at Merck Sharp & Dohme (MSD) where he rose from being an industrial engineer to become the chief financial officer (CFO) of Merck's operations in Brazil. He also served as the Senior Finance Director for Merck's manufacturing division in Puerto Rico and as regional finance director for Merck's operations in Central America and the Caribbean.

Medina was also instrumental in establishing the first MRO business unit of Lufthansa in the western hemisphere, the United States, and Puerto Rico in 2014 while heading PRIDCO.
