= Carlos Medina =

Venezuelan visual artist

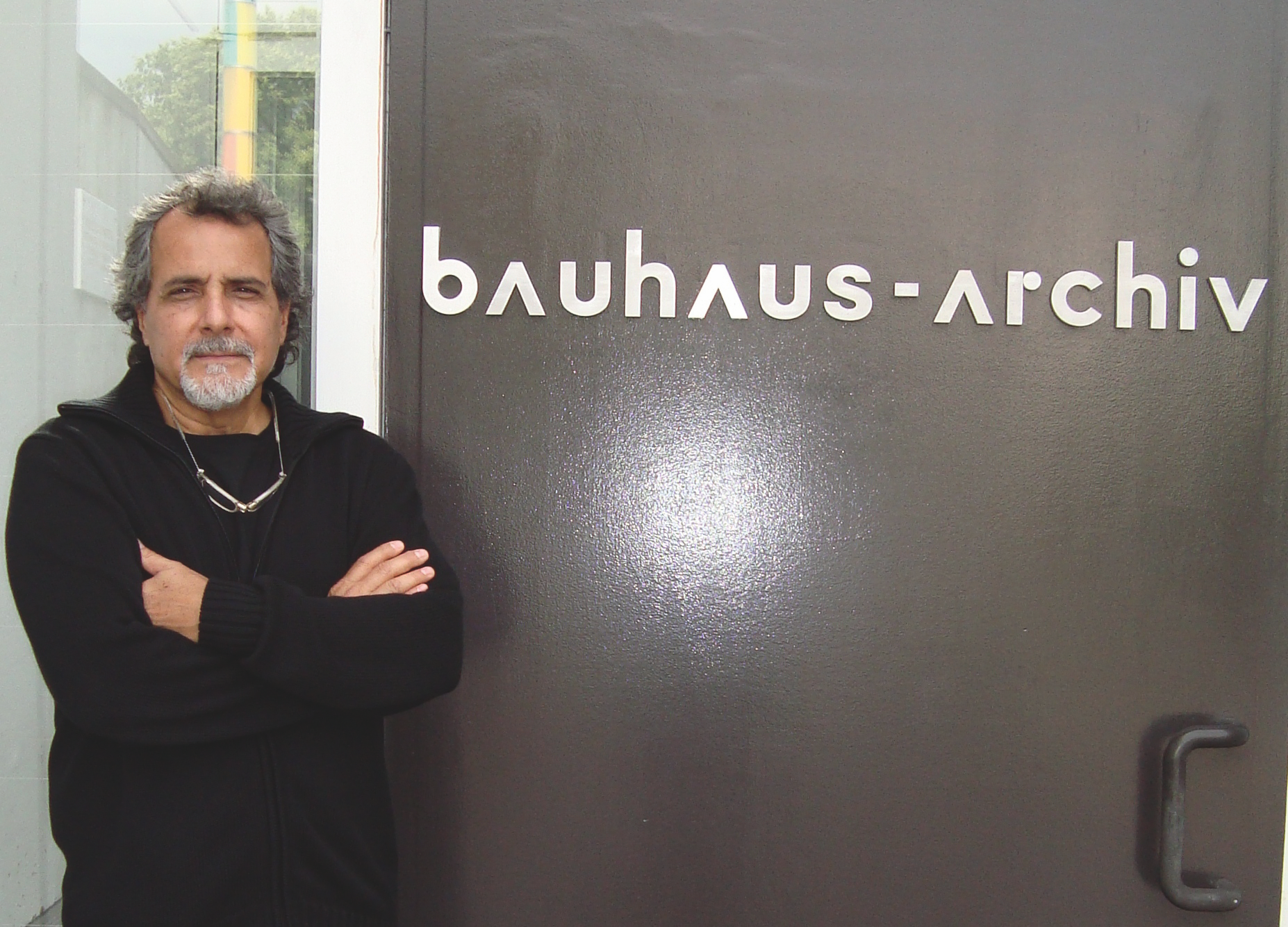
- Carlos Medina at Bauhaus Archive
- Born: 1953 (age 72–73); Barquisimeto, Venezuela
- Occupations: Venezuelan artist

Carlos Medina is a Venezuelan-born (1953, Barquisimeto) France-based visual artist primarily known for his minimalist geometric compositions and significant spatial interventions, which combine sculpture techniques and plastic arts. He has had over twenty exhibitions in museums worldwide, and his works are present in collections, and public spaces, in countries such as Italy, France, Belgium, Yugoslavia, the United States, South Korea, Austria, Hungary, Spain, Mexico, Chile, Argentina, Colombia, Panama, Costa Rica, and Venezuela.

He has been recognized with important awards, has held individual exhibitions, and is represented in the collections of national museums in his country, including the Museum of Fine Arts of Caracas, the Museum of Contemporary Art of Caracas and the National Art Gallery; as well as internationally in spaces such as the Das Klein Museum, Germany, Frank Popper Foundation, France; Satoru Sato Art Museum, Japan; Museum of Latin American Art in Los Angeles, US; the White House, US; Museum of the Arts of the University of Guadalajara.

Carlos Medina is also known for various lines of research, always within geometry, for the exploration of different materials and techniques and also for the creation of spatial interventions and urban interventions in public spaces.

== Education ==
In 1975, at the age of 22, after completing his Pure Art and Art History studies at the School of Plastic Arts Cristobal Rojas in Caracas (Escuela de Artes Plásticas Cristóbal Rojas), Carlos Medina held his first solo exhibition at the Museum of Contemporary Art in Caracas. There, he presented geometric works in iron assembly carved from Cumarebo limestone.

In 1977, the Italian government and the Venezuelan governmental institution FUNDARTE (Fundación para la Cultura y las Artes) awarded him a scholarship to train in Carrara, Italy, where he resided for seven years and expanded his artistic pursuits towards central Europe. During this period, Medina explored new materials, honed superior carving and turning techniques, and delved into new conceptualizations of 3D modeling work. He worked at Carlo Andrei's atelier and the Gonari Marmi Industry, crafting bronze sculptures at the Pietrasanta Fonderia Artistica Mariani while attending courses at the Accademia di Belle Arti di Carrara.

Additionally, Medina pursued studies in graphical techniques at the Frans Masereel Centrum in Belgium and participated in various workshops conducted by sculptors such as Sérgio de Camargo, Giò Pomodoro, Alicia Penalba, and Gonzalo Fonseca.

== Work ==
In 1984, Carlos Medina returned to Caracas, where he presented the exhibition "Esculturas," featuring a series of more than thirty granite, marble, and travertine sculptures, alongside approximately thirty drawings and engravings executed in black and gold Indian ink. This exhibition was showcased in the Museo de Bellas Artes and the Museo de Arte Contemporáneo in Caracas, as well as in major art museums in other cities such as Barquisimeto, Porlamar, and Maracay.

Over the subsequent decades, Medina developed more than twenty large-scale sculptures, notably the "Fragmentos de lluvia" (Rain fragments). One recurring project, initiated in 1989, reached its culmination in 2014 with a large-scale replica gifted to the city of Caracas. Comprising seven metallic droplets each standing at six meters high, these sculptures are now situated outdoors alongside the Francisco de Miranda Freeway, one of the Venezuelan capital's main routes. Medina's works also extend into the public domain, integrating spaces such as the Caracas Metro, SIDOR, and various public squares and commercial centres across the national territory.

Journalist Alfonso Molina describes Medina as "a reference of geometric sculpture in Venezuela, with more than 20 monumental works created," citing the "Fragment of the Rain" in Caracas as a notable example.

Medina's oeuvre reflects influences from prominent Venezuelan masters such as Alejandro Otero, Jesús Rafael Soto, and Carlos Cruz-Diez, with whom he has exchanged ideas. American journalist David D’Arcy asserts that “Medina is heir to the geometric abstraction of the Venezuelan kineticists: Jesús-Rafael Soto, Carlos Cruz-Diez, Gego (Gertrud Goldschmidt), and Alejandro Otero.” Medina's artistic evolution is characterized by his transition from early works in black iron to large-format pieces in stone, wood, and metals, culminating in his current sculptural approach, which involves suspending pieces in space and experimenting with contemporary materials to refine perceptions of lightness among aesthetic values.

After presenting his first Essential exhibition in 2009 at the Graphicart Gallery, Caracas, Carlos Medina embarked on an international travelling exhibition concept in 2012. This concept materialized in a workshop-exhibition experience at the Museum of the Arts of Guadalajara (MUSA), Mexico. Subsequently, the exhibition journeyed to various locations, including Maracaibo at the Museum of Contemporary Art of Zulia, Venezuela; Miami, USA; Panama City, Panama; and the [Fernando Garcia Ponce Museum-MACAY] (Museum of Contemporary Art of Yucatán), Mexico. The exhibition integrated a series of delicate spatial interventions of Fragments of rain, Neutrinos, Threads of light, and geometric structures constructed with different techniques and materials such as wood, laser cuts, and PVC sheets.

ArtNexus encapsulates Medina's work as "...the possibility of expressing through matter, that which transcends matter itself, the true essence of objects manifested only by the presence of the objects."

Focused on geometric abstraction, Medina's work progresses from volumetric to spatial concerns, culminating in the essential and invisible interpretation of the universe and forms—central concepts exemplifying the complete evolution of his work.

Félix Suazo elaborates on Medina's Neutrino Spheres, emphasizing notions of immateriality, emptiness, lightness, and light, while metaphorically connecting extreme powers from the microscopic to the macroscopic, from the corporeal to the incomprehensible, and from the visible to the invisible.

For a visual example of Carlos Medina's Neutrino Spheres, see [Fragment of Rain I on Google Arts & Culture]( Carlos Medina - Exhibiciones)

Over the last decade, Medina revisited an investigation aligned with his current intention to suspend real and virtual forms through reflection, integrating and reflecting the environment, and incorporating the spectator into the work. Pieces such as “Círculo y Cuadrado” (Circle and Square), composed of stainless steel with a mirror-polished finish, exemplify this approach. Dennys Matos from ArtNexus remarks on Medina's pieces, noting their ability to "fly" or "float," connecting aesthetic and scientific discourses while conveying the inapprehensible, inexpressible experience of being in the world.

The nature of Medina’s work is eloquently described by Cervantes award laureated poet Rafael Cadenas in the prologue of Belgica Rodriguez's book "Medina: From Material to Essential," emphasizing the fundamental aspects of nature, reality, and attentiveness inherent in Medina's artistic expression: “Medina used three words that seem fundamental to me about his work: nature, reality and attentiveness. We are surrounded by nature and also are part of it, and in fact what we do, what gives rise to culture and civilization, is the work of nature; what we call reality seems more inclusive than it, though it is still a creation of nature: we know it, but even if we go to the ends of the earth we don’t know what it is; as far as attentiveness is concerned, how much depends on exercising it! Without this one lives with one’s mind elsewhere, so one lives less. Rilke says on Rodin’s advice that he learned to see, that is, to gaze at things attentively."

== Exhibitions ==
Some of his exhibitions include:

=== Individual exhibitions ===
- 2023 Neutrinos, Denise René Gallery, Paris, France
- 2021 Beyond the Visible Ascaso Gallery - Miami, USA
- 2019 El Arte de la Levedad (The Art of Lightness). Espacio Cesta República Madrid, Spain
- 2018 Sphères de Neutrinos. Palais Royal. París, France
- 2018 Del Concepto a la Forma. Centro de Arte de Guanajuato, Mexico
- 2017 Essentials Fragments. Espace Meyer Zafra, Paris, France
- 2016 Essential, Ascaso Gallery, Miami, USA & Imperceptible, Galería de Arte Ascaso, Caracas, Venezuela
- 2015 Esencial. Marion Gallery, Panamá City. Panamá
- 2013 Esencial, Museo de Arte Contemporáneo del Zulia (MACZUL), Maracaibo, Venezuela, Museo de Arte Contemporáneo de Yucatán (MACAY), Mérida, Mexico.
- 2012 Esencial: Exhibition-Workshop: Museo de las Artes de Guadalajara (MUSA), Mexico
- 2011 White Surfaces, Art Nouveau Gallery, Miami, USA
- 2006 Papeles (Papers) Museo de Arte Contemporáneo de Caracas, Venezuela
- 2003 Carlos Medina. Museo de la Cultura Maya, Chetumal, Mexico.
- 1990 Trabajos en Madera (Works in Wood), Museo de Arte Contemporáneo de Caracas
- 1987 Mármoles (Marbles), Museo de Arte Moderno Jesús Soto, Ciudad Bolívar, Venezuela
- 1984 Carlos Medina Esculturas, Museo de Bellas Artes, Caracas, Venezuela
- 1979 Marbles and Granites. Van Vlaenderens Gallery & Luka Gallery, Belgium
- 1975 Abstracciones Geométricas Espaciales, Museo de Arte Contemporáneo de Caracas, Venezuela
- 2023 The Human Condition and Its Place in the Universe. Madrid Luxury Art, Madrid, Spain & Wood Transformation. Modern and Contemporary Art Museum of Kostanjevica. Slovenia
- 2022 Valija Latinoamericana, Centro Cultural San Clemente, Toledo, Spain, Why white? Galerie Wagner, Paris, France, & Neutrino Spheres. Special Projects. Pinta. Miami, USA
- 2021 Fragment of Rain. Art Verona. Galeria E3 Contemporanea - Verona, Italia & Mesures Démesures Galerie Graf - Paris, France
- 2020 Fragment Inmersive - Space and Tension Galerie Denise René - Espace Marais, Paris, France
- 2018 Géométries de Lumière. Galerie Wagner - Le Touquet, France
- 2017 Sculpture en la Nature. Villa Datris Foundation. L’Isle-Sur-La-Sorge, Paris, France
- 2015 Veintiuno XXI (Twenty-one XXI). The plastic of the 21st century, MUSA Collection, Guadalajara, Mexico
- 2012 I International Steel Sculpture Exhibition, Villacero Foundation, Monterrey, Mexico & Contemporary Narratives, Andean Development Corporation (CAF), Caracas, Venezuela
- 2009 La Estrategia de la Forma, Museo MARCO, Monterrey, Mexico
- 2008 XI Cairo Biennial, Egypt
- 2007 Latin American Steel Sculpture, Museum of Modern Art, Cartagena, Colombia
- 2006 MOLAA Awards, Museum of Latin American Art in Los Angeles, USA & International Granite Sculpture Symposium, Yeong Wol International Museum of Contemporary Art, South Korea
- 2005 Venezuelan Art of the 21st Century, Fine Arts Museum, Caracas
- 2002 I Andean Sculpture Biennial, Museum of Modern Art, Cuenca, Ecuador
- 1998 International Sculpture Exhibition, Mala Espina Palace, Zacatecas, Mexico
- 1996 Small Format Sculptures, Municipal Hall, Alajuela, Costa Rica1984 One Hundred Works from the Collection, Museum of Contemporary Art, Caracas
- 1981 Ministry of Culture Traveling Exhibition through National Museums, Belgium & International Sculpture Symposium, Lindabrunn, Austria.
- 1980 Sculptures in the Royal Villa, Ostend, Belgium
- 1978 International Sculpture Exhibition, Palazzo del Comune, Carrara, Italy

== Collections and recognitions ==
Throughout his career, Medina has garnered recognition in various countries.

In 1993, in Argentina, he received the Sculptors' Prize at the Resistance Sculpture Symposium. Also in 1993, he was honoured with the Grand Prize at the Michelena Salon during its LI edition, marking him as the first sculptor in history to achieve this distinction. Prior to this, he had secured the Sculpture prizes at the same Salon in the years 1986, 1987, and 1992. In 2008, he received an Honourable Mention for his project "Drop at 20 meters high" at the I Guadalajara Biennial. In 2014, he was awarded the Sculpture Prize by the Venezuelan Association of Plastic Artists (AVAP). In 2018, he won a competition to intervene in the Plaza de la Gare Bussy St. George, the gateway to Euro Disney in France. In 2020, he was recognized by the Association of Art Critics (AICA) as the "Artist with the greatest international projection".

== Other notable recognitions ==
Book of the Year by the International Association of Art Critics (AICA) Venezuela in 2017. Order of Honour of the Museum of Contemporary Art of Venezuela in 2015. Best Collective Exhibition by the International Association of Art Critics (AICA) Venezuela in 2014. Guest of Honour and Keys to the City in Resistencia, Argentina in 2012. Special mention at the Salon Exxon Móvil, National Art Gallery, Caracas in 2003. Award from the Ministry of Education and Culture at the I Andean Sculpture Biennial, Museum of Modern Art, Cuenca, Ecuador, in 2002. Sculpture Prize at the XVII Aragua National Art Hall, Maracay, Venezuela, in 1992. National Sculpture Biennial Prize, Francisco Narváez Museum of Contemporary Art, Porlamar, Venezuela, in 1991. I Biennial of Guayana Prize, Jesús Soto Museum of Modern Art, Ciudad Bolívar, Venezuela, in 1986. Unique Acquisition Award from the National Council of Culture, Caracas, Venezuela, in 1981. City of Carrara Award, Italy, in 1978. Painting Prize at the I International Biennial of Young Artists, Viareggio, Italy, in 1976. Sculpture Prize at the II Fondene Art Hall, Porlamar, Venezuela. National Young Artists Salon Award. Award from the National Institute of Culture and Fine Arts, Caracas, Venezuela, in 1975.

Medina's work is featured in public and private collections worldwide. Selected international collections include the Belgian Ministry of Culture, Belgium; Franz Popper Foundation, France; Marble Professional Institute, Italy; Ministry of Foreign Affairs, Italy; Das Klein Museum, Germany; San Clemente Cultural Center, Spain; Museum of Modern and Contemporary Art, Konstanjevica Slovenia; White House Washington, USA; Cisneros Fontanal Foundation (CIFO), USA; Museum of Latin American Art of Los Angeles (MOLAA), USA; Museum of the Arts, Guadalajara, Mexico; University of Guadalajara, Mexico; Villacero Foundation, Mexico; Museum of Fine Arts, Chile; Museum of Argentine Sculpture, Satoru Sato Art Museum, Japan; Yeongwol International Museum of Contemporary Art, South Korea.

Collections in Venezuela encompass the Museum of Contemporary Art of Caracas; Museum of Fine Arts; National Art Gallery; Alejandro Otero Museum; Zulia Museum of Contemporary Art; Museum of Contemporary Art of Maracay, Mario Abreu; Museum of Contemporary Art of Valencia; Francisco Narváez Museum of Contemporary Art; Palace of Justice of Barquisimeto; Mayor's Office of Palavecino; Puerto La Cruz Municipal Art Gallery; Girardot Municipal Art Gallery; Siderúrgica del Orinoco; Procter & Gamble, among others.

== See also ==
- Contemporary art
- Visual arts
- List of Venezuelan artists
- Venezuelan art
- Spanish art
- Art of South America
