= Maria Viganò =

Austrian ballet dancer

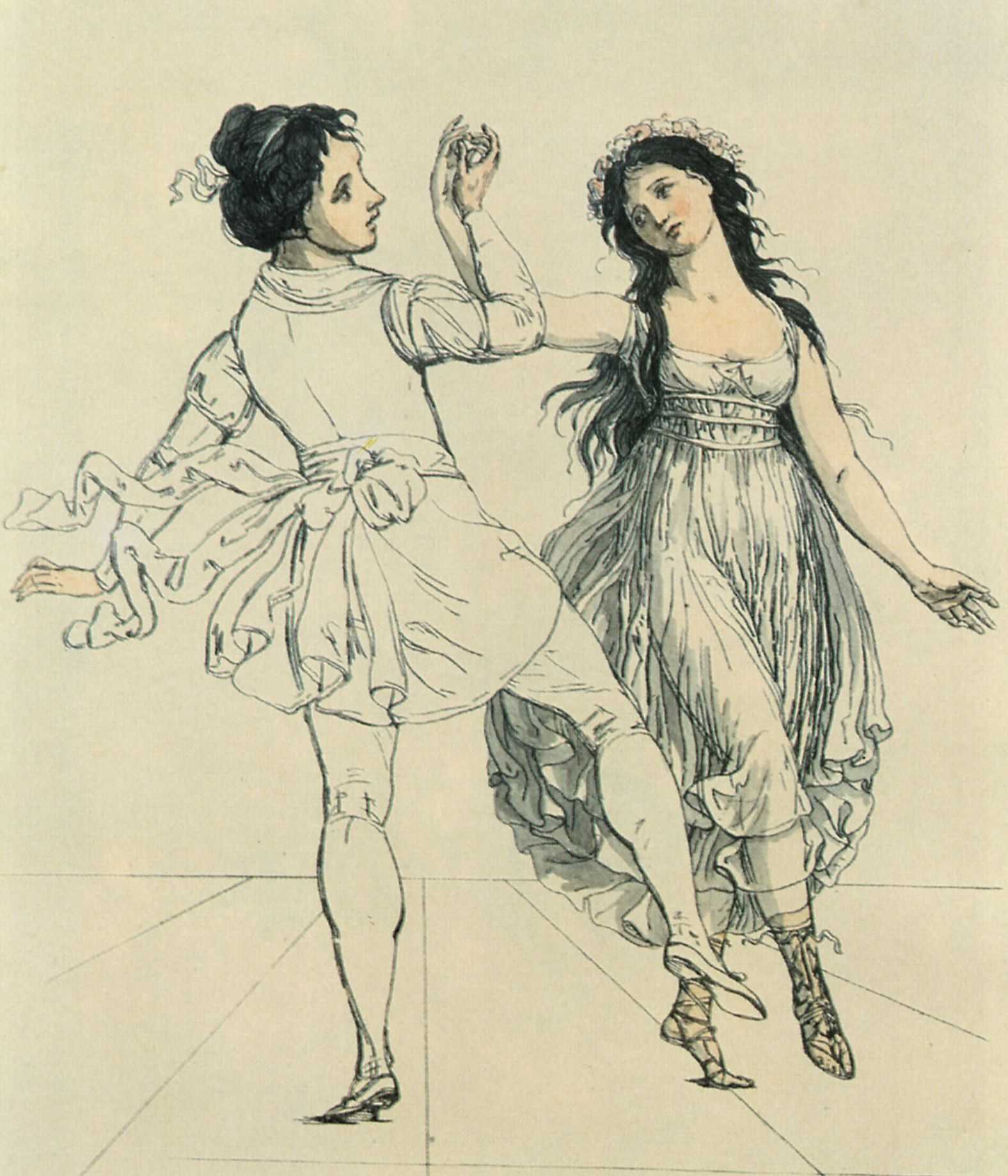
The dancing couple Viganò, an etching by Johann Gottfried Schadow

Maria Viganò (was known as Maria Medina or Madame Salvatore Viganò; 1769–1821) was an Austrian ballet dancer. She was the wife of Salvatore Viganò. She was engaged at the Wiener Hofoper and internationally famous in her time. She introduced a reform in European ballet when she introduced the flesh-colored ballet costume, giving the impression of performing in the nude, which caused a sensation.

María fue clave en la difusión del nuevo lenguaje dancístico del bolero. Estaba dotada de una enorme agilidad para el salto y para las castañuelas. Con su trabajo influyó decididamente en el trabajo de Viganó y en los intérpretes de su época y se considera, una de las principales artífices de la difusión entre la escuela española y el naciente, para aquel entonces, lenguaje del ballet
