= Ramón Rosa Rodríguez =

Paraguayan military officer

Personal details
- Died: 10 October 1994 Asunción

Military service
- Rank: General

General Ramón Rosa Rodríguez (? – 10 October 1994) was a Paraguayan military officer. He was the head of Paraguay's national anti-drugs agency, Secretaría Nacional Antidrogas (SENAD), and was delivering a report to President Juan Carlos Wasmosy when he was assassinated. One of the soldiers escorting him, Captain Juan Emiliano Ruiz Díaz, was convicted of his murder in 1997. Rosa Rodríguez' suitcase was stolen in the attack, later re-appearing with most of its contents missing. The missing report is said to have implicated ex-President Andrés Rodríguez, then a Senator, as "the chief drug kingpin in Paraguay".
