= Capáez, Hatillo, Puerto Rico =

Barrio of Puerto Rico

Capáez
- Barrio
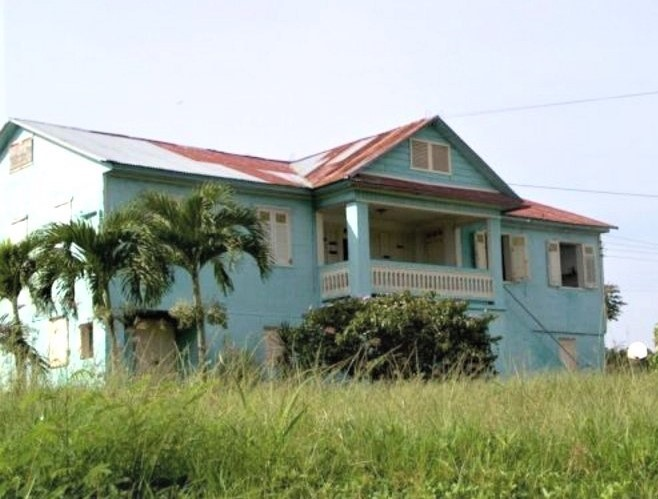
- Casa de Don Juan Rosa Mora in Capáez, built in the 19th century

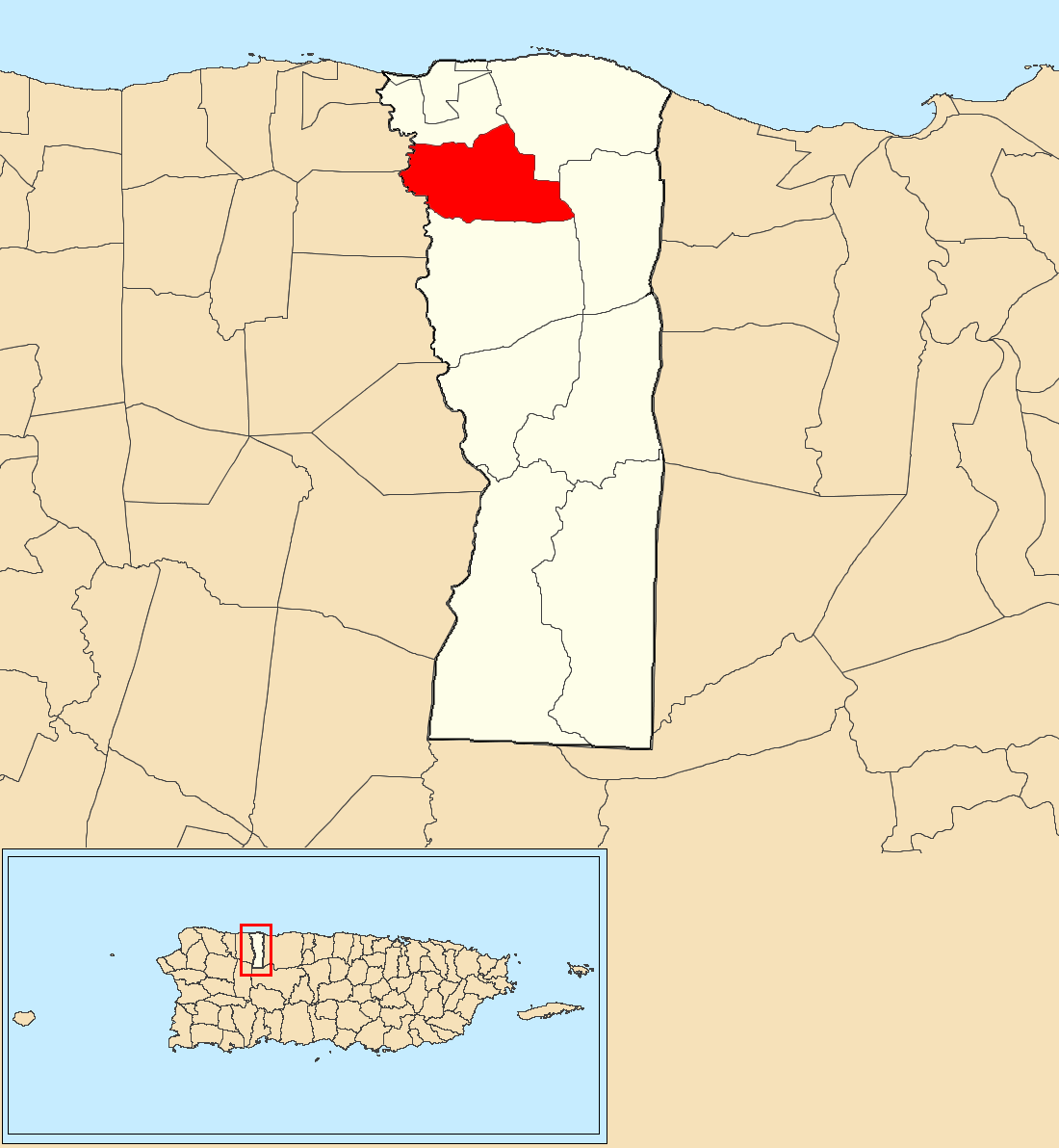
- Location of Capáez within the municipality of Hatillo shown in red

- Location of Puerto Rico
- Coordinates: 18°27′40″N 66°48′45″W
- Commonwealth: Puerto Rico
- Municipality: Hatillo

Area
  - Total: 2.94 sq mi (7.6 km^{2})
  - Land: 2.94 sq mi (7.6 km^{2})
  - Water: 0 sq mi (0 km^{2})
- Elevation: 279 ft (85 m)

Population (2010)
  - Total: 4,231
  - Density: 1,439.1/sq mi (555.6/km^{2})
- Source: 2010 Census
- Time zone: UTC−4 (AST)

Capáez is a rural barrio with an urban zone in the municipality of Hatillo, Puerto Rico. Its population in 2010 was 4,231.

Historical population
Census	Pop.	Note	%±
1900	1,016		—
1910	957		−5.8%
1920	957		0.0%
1930	1,273		33.0%
1940	1,411		10.8%
1950	1,630		15.5%
1960	1,446		−11.3%
1970	1,432		−1.0%
1980	2,629		83.6%
1990	3,363		27.9%
2000	4,271		27.0%
2010	4,231		−0.9%
U.S. Decennial Census; 1899 (shown as 1900) 1910-1930; 1930-1950 1980-2000 2010

== History ==
Capáez was in Spain's gazetteers until Puerto Rico was ceded by Spain in the aftermath of the Spanish–American War under the terms of the Treaty of Paris of 1898 and became an unincorporated territory of the United States. In 1899, the United States Department of War conducted a census of Puerto Rico finding that the population of Capáez barrio was 1,016.

== Gallery ==
On PR-130 in and around Capáez, Hatillo:

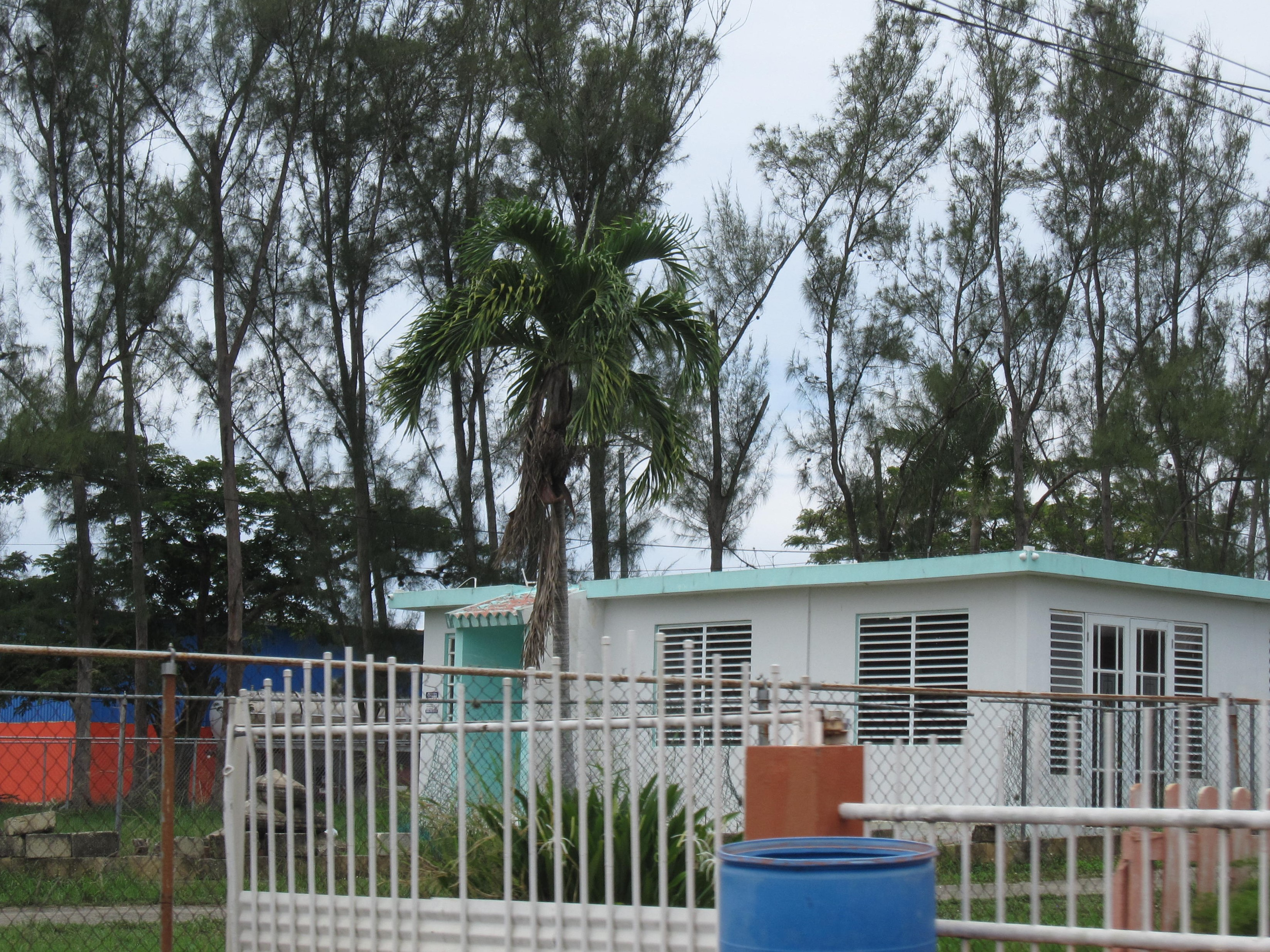

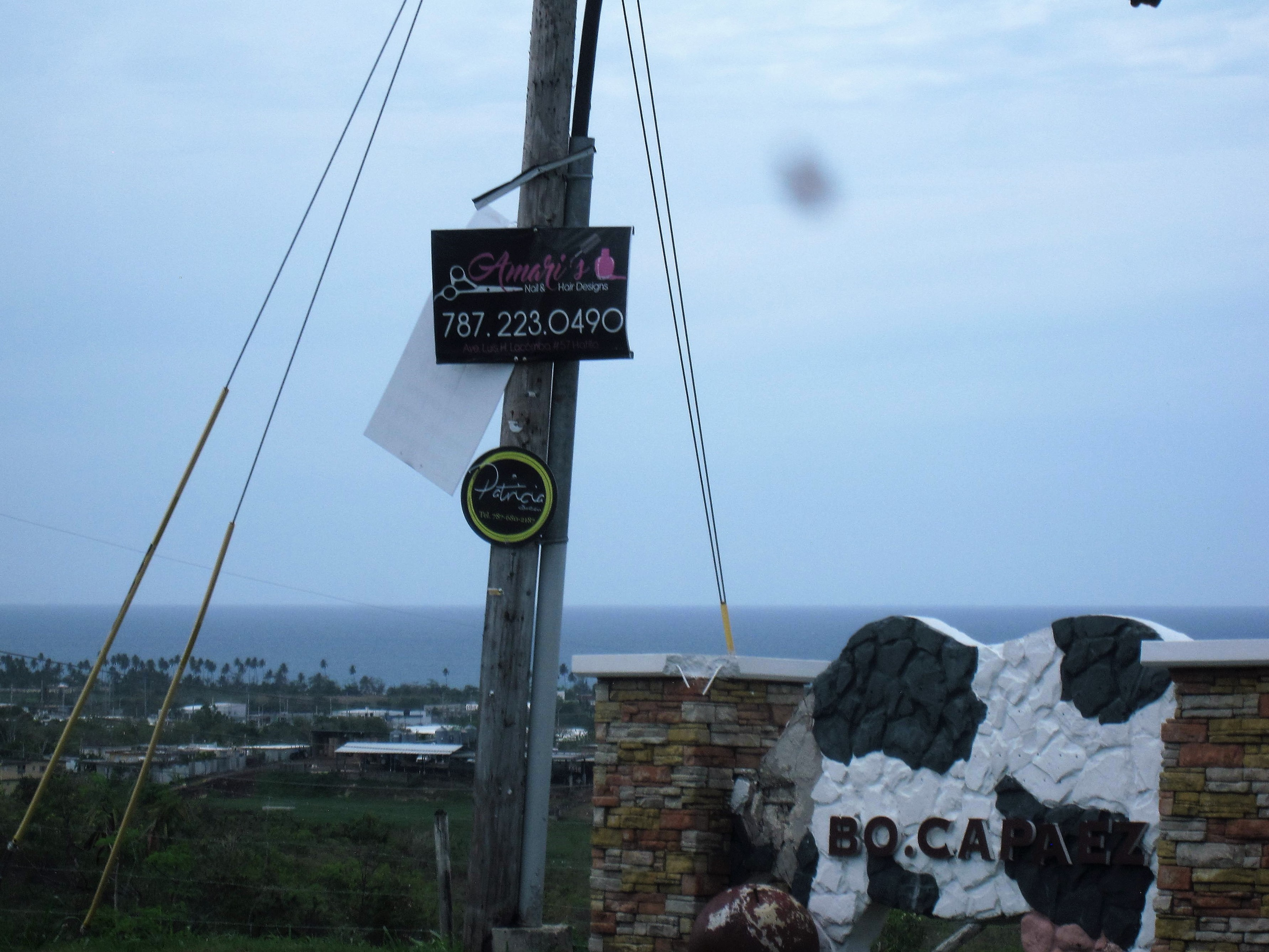

== See also ==
- List of communities in Puerto Rico
