= Lalla Rookh (1875 ship) =

Australian ketch built in 1875

Lalla Rookh (sometimes referred to as Lallah Rookh but registered with the former spelling) was an Australian wooden two-masted ketch, also sometimes referred to as a schooner, 59 (or 60) tons. She was built on the Bellinger River in New South Wales in 1875, and named after Lalla Rookh (1823 ship), (Note: If no article yet, see Lalla Rookh (ship).) the first sizeable ship to visit Brisbane. The ketch Lalla Rookh was first registered in Townsville, Queensland, by Aplin Brown & Company.

Lalla Rookh was reportedly used for blackbirding (the practice of taking people as slaves or indentured labourers from islands of the Pacific) at some point, and later for carrying timber. She was purchased in 1886 by the timber company Rooneys Ltd.

Although some newspaper reports after Cyclone Sigma in the Townsville area in January 1896 said that the schooner Lalla Rookh "with a full load of log timber from Cairns" was missing and thought lost in the storm, later reports revealed that she had escaped intact, and carried on carrying timber up and down the coast for a few more years. Several voyages between Townsville and Maryborough are reported between 1897 and 1898 under the command of Captain C. A. Nordstrom, most often described as a schooner, but with at least one description as a 49-ton ketch.

She was finally wrecked somewhere off the Queensland coast while carrying timber between Townsville and Maryborough in December 1899. A later source, quoting Jack Loney, says that the ketch left Townsville for Maryborough with a crew of four, and was last seen on 22 December 1899 off L Island (now Scawfell Island, one of the South Cumberlands group), shortly before a tropical cyclone struck the area. She was carrying a single passenger, William Eli Walding. A 20 January 1900 report in the Brisbane Courier says she was last seen leaving for Maryborough, after having been anchored at the Pine Islet (one of the Percy Isles) sheltering from "the same stress of weather which it will be remembered caused the wreck of the schooner Eclipse". She was carrying only one passenger, and four crew. A search was undertaken by government steamers from Rockhampton and Maryborough, but the vessel was not reported being seen afloat again, and the crew of four were presumed lost.

No trace of a wreck was reported, but months later a piece of timber was discovered on one of the Percy Isles, and was identified as part of Lalla Rookh. There were no survivors. She was presumed wrecked on either the Whitsundays or the Cumberland Islands.
