= List of shipwrecks in April 1836 =

The list of shipwrecks in April 1836 includes ships sunk, foundered, wrecked, grounded, or otherwise lost during April 1836.

== 1 April ==
List of shipwrecks: 1 April 1836
Ship	State	Description
Friends	United Kingdom	The sloop ran aground and was holed at Arbroath, Forfarshire. She was subsequently taken in to Arbroath for repairs.
Mary	United Kingdom	The barque was destroyed by fire at Cobh, County Cork.
Shelmalire	United Kingdom	The shipran aground on Harold's Rock, off Cratloe, County Clare. She was on a voyage from Limerick to Saint John, New Brunswick, British North America.
Tesson	Hamburg	The ship was wrecked on the Dick Sand, in the North Sea off the Oldenburg coast. Her crew were rescued. She was on a voyage from Matanzas, Cuba to Hamburg.
Thomas and Ann	United Kingdom	The brig was driven ashore and wrecked at Petten, North Holland, Netherlands. Her crew were rescued by the Petten Lifeboat.
Venus	United Kingdom	The ship was wrecked near Harlingen, Friesland, Netherlands. Her crew were rescued. She was on a voyage from Newcastle upon Tyne, Northumberland to Amsterdam, North Holland.

== 2 April ==
List of shipwrecks: 2 April 1836
Ship	State	Description
Amity	United Kingdom	The ship was driven ashore and damaged at Bideford, Devon. She was on a voyage from Newport, Monmouthshire to Boston, Lincolnshire.
Eliza	Belgium	The ship was driven ashore and wrecked at Ostend, West Flanders. She was on a voyage from St. Ubes, Portugal to Ostend.
Mary McGill	United Kingdom	The ship capsized and sank at the mouth of the River Shannon with the loss of all hands. She was on a voyage from Tralee, County Kerry to Liverpool, Lancashire.
Nimrod	United Kingdom	The paddle steamer was driven ashore and severely damaged at Ayr. She was on a voyage from Glasgow, Renfrewshire to Ayr.
Ocean	United Kingdom	The ship foundered at Padstow, Cornwall with the loss of all hands and a pilot.
Robert and Mary	United Kingdom	The ship foundered in the Bristol Channel off Lundy Island, Devon. She was on a voyage from Swansea, Glamorgan to Barnstaple, Devon.
Union	United Kingdom	The ship was driven ashore at Burnham-on-Sea, Somerset.
Vallenia	United Kingdom	The ship was driven ashore and wrecked at Memel, Prussia.

== 3 April ==
List of shipwrecks: 3 April 1836
Ship	State	Description
Eliza	United Kingdom	The ship was driven ashore at Ostend, West Flanders, Belgium.
Traveller	United Kingdom	The ship was driven ashore at St. Mary's, Isles of Scilly. She was on a voyage from Cork to London. Traveller was refloated the next day.
United Brothers	United Kingdom	The ship foundered off the Calf of Man, Isle of Man. Her crew were rescued. She was on a voyage from Liverpool, Lancashire to Nantes, Loire-Inférieure, France.

== 4 April ==
List of shipwrecks: 4 April 1836
Ship	State	Description
Adelphi	United Kingdom	The ship ran aground on the Perch Rock, off the coast of Anglesey. She was on a voyage from Beaumaris, Anglesey to Gloucester. She was refloated the next day and put back to Beaumaris.
Lisbon Packet	United Kingdom	The ship foundered in the Atlantic Ocean with the loss of all hands.
Phylarea	United Kingdom	The collier struck the Hecla Reef and foundered off Havre de Grâce, Seine-Inférieure. France. Her crew were rescued.
Speculator	United Kingdom	The collier struck the Hecla Reef and foundered off Havre de Grâce. Her crew were rescued by Bienfaisante (France).
Venus	Norway	The ship was wrecked on the Banjaard Sand in the North Sea off the Dutch coast. Her crew were rescued. She was on a voyage from Christiania to Caen, Calvados, France.

== 5 April ==
List of shipwrecks: 5 April 1836
Ship	State	Description
Frau Anna Rebecca	Duchy of Holstein	The ship was driven ashore on the north coast of Fehmarn.

== 7 April ==
List of shipwrecks: 7 April 1836
Ship	State	Description
Bassenthwaite	United Kingdom	The ship struck rocks off the Isles of Scilly and foundered with the loss of two of her crew. She was on a voyage from Liverpool, Lancashire to Quebec City, Lower Canada, British North America.
Elizabeth	Duchy of Holstein	The ship sank near the mouth of the Eider.

== 8 April ==
List of shipwrecks: 8 April 1836
Ship	State	Description
Astrea	United Kingdom	The ship collided with Mells (United Kingdom) and was abandoned 7 leagues (21 nautical miles (39 km)) west south west of the Tuscar Rock. Her crew were rescued by Mells.

== 9 April ==
List of shipwrecks: 9 April 1836
Ship	State	Description
Henrick	Norway	The ship was wrecked at Douglas, Isle of Man. She was on a voyage from Arendal to Douglas.
Johannes	Russia	The ship was driven ashore at Hamburg. She was on a voyage from Riga to "Rivadeo". Johannes was later refloated and taken in to "Burgowick".

== 10 April ==
List of shipwrecks: 10 April 1836
Ship	State	Description
Rashleigh	United Kingdom	The ship collided with Europa (Hamburg) and foundered off Penzance Cornwall. She was on a voyage from Swansea, Glamorgan to Plymouth, Devon.

== 11 April ==
List of shipwrecks: 11 April 1836
Ship	State	Description
Henry and Thomas	United Kingdom	The ship was wrecked near Ravenglass, Cumberland. She was on a voyage from Douglas, Isle of Man to Maryport, Cumberland.
Lalla Rookh	United Kingdom	The brig (built 1825 in South Shields) was wrecked near Wick, Scotland, around midnight on 11 (or 12?) April 1836. She was sailing from Newcastle-upon-Tyne to Quebec in ballast under the command of Captain Green, during a severe easterly gale, and was driven onto rocks at Elzy, a couple of miles east of Wick.

== 12 April ==
List of shipwrecks: 12 April 1836
Ship	State	Description
Collingwood	United Kingdom	The collier foundered in the English Channel 35 nautical miles (65 km) south west by south of Beachy Head, Sussex. She was on a voyage from Newcastle upon Tyne, Northumberland to Gibraltar.

== 13 April ==
List of shipwrecks: 13 April 1836
Ship	State	Description
Catherine	Hamburg	The ship capsized in the North Sea off Cromer, Norfolk, United Kingdom with the loss of four of the six people on board. The survivors were rescued the next day by Lucie (United Kingdom). Catherine was on a voyage from Hamburg to London, United Kingdom.
Mercurius	Bremen	The ship was wrecked at Thisted, Denmark. She was on a voyage from Bremen to a Baltic port.
Northumberland	United Kingdom	The ship struck the Ness of Guise, off John o' Groats, Caithness and was wrecked. She was on a voyage from Ardrossan, Ayrshire to Hamburg.

== 14 April ==
List of shipwrecks: 14 April 1836
Ship	State	Description
Hope	United Kingdom	The ship ran aground at Maryport, Cumberland.

== 15 April ==
List of shipwrecks: 15 April 1836
Ship	State	Description
Enterprise	United Kingdom	The ship was lost in the River Severn. She was on a voyage from Sydney, New South Wales to Bridgwater, Somerset.
James	United Kingdom	The ship was driven ashore and wrecked at Cape Florida, Florida Territory. She was on a voyage from Mobile, Alabama, United States to Cowes, Isle of Wight.

== 17 April ==
List of shipwrecks: 17 April 1836
Ship	State	Description
Spring	United Kingdom	The brig was driven ashore crewless at Whitby, Yorkshire. She was refloated on 23 April and taken in to Whitby.

== 18 April ==
List of shipwrecks: 18 April 1836
Ship	State	Description
Britannia	United Kingdom	The ship caught fire and sank in the English Channel off Exmouth, Devon. She was on a voyage from Newcastle upon Tyne, Northumberland to Exeter, Devon. The wreck was later refloated.
Johanna	Belgium	The ship sank at Gotland, Sweden. Her crew were rescued. She was on a voyage from Antwerp to Saint Petersburg, Russia.

== 19 April ==
List of shipwrecks: 19 April 1836
Ship	State	Description
Resolucao	Brazil	The ship was driven ashore and wrecked on the coast of Pará. She was on a voyage from Maranhão to Pará.

== 22 April ==
List of shipwrecks: 22 April 1836
Ship	State	Description
Guernsey Lily	(United Kingdom of Great Britain and Ireland) Guernsey	The ship ran aground, capsized and was severely damaged at Jersey, Channel Islands. She was on a voyage from Hamburg to Jersey.
Vrow Elizabeth	Danzig	The ship was wrecked by ice off "Point Perrispoe", Russia. She was on a voyage from Liverpool, Lancashire, United Kingdom to Danzig and Narva, Russia.
William Huskisson	United Kingdom	The paddle steamer ran aground on the North Bank, in Liverpool Bay. She was on a voyage from Dublin to Liverpool, Lancashire.

== 25 April ==
List of shipwrecks: 25 April 1836
Ship	State	Description
Katherine	United Kingdom	The ship ran aground on the West Hoyle Bank, in Liverpool Bay. She was on a voyage from Liverpool, Lancashire to Wilmington, Delaware, United States.

== 27 April ==
List of shipwrecks: 27 April 1836
Ship	State	Description
Bonny Lass	United Kingdom	The ship was driven ashore on Sanday, Inner Hebrides. She was on a voyage from Greenock, Renfrewshire to Tarbert, Argyllshire. She was refloated on 26 May and taken in to Campbeltown, Argyllshire.

== 28 April ==
List of shipwrecks: 28 April 1836
Ship	State	Description
Penketh	United Kingdom	The ship foundered off the mouth of the River Dee. Her crew were rescued. She was on a voyage from Caernarvon to Liverpool, Lancashire.

== 29 April ==
List of shipwrecks: 29 April 1836
Ship	State	Description
Ann Eliza	(United Kingdom of Great Britain and Ireland) Antigua	The drogher was wrecked in the Bird Island Channel.
Charles Guillaume	France	The ship ran aground on the Belfast Rock, Antigua. She was on a voyage from Bordeaux, Gironde to Guadeloupe.
St. Anthonie	Netherlands	The ship was driven ashore at Virga, Russia. She was on a voyage from Amsterdam, North Holland to a Baltic port.

== Unknown date ==
List of shipwrecks: Unknown date in April 1836
Ship	State	Description
Arethusa	United Kingdom	The schooner was run down and sunk in the Atlantic Ocean off the Tuskar Rock by Molo (United Kingdom) on or before 4 April. Her crew were rescued by Molo.
Arzac	France	The ship was wrecked at "Lachaume" on or before 3 April. She was on a voyage from New York to La Rochelle, Charente Maritime.
Caledonia	United Kingdom	The ship was wrecked near Laguna. She was on a voyage from Laguna to Cowes, Isle of Wight.
Catharina Elizabeth	Heligoland	The ship was lost near the mouth of the Eider.
Cora Nelly	France	The ship was driven ashore on the Île d'Aix, Charente-Maritime. She was on a voyage from India to Bordeaux, Gironde.
Henry and Thomas	United Kingdom	The ship was driven ashore and severely damaged at Ravenglass, Cumberland. She was on a voyage from Douglas, Isle of Man to Maryport, Cumberland. Henry and Thomas was refloated on 23 April and taken in to Maryport.
Hetty	(United Kingdom of Great Britain and Ireland) New South Wales	The ship was driven ashore and wrecked at Port Phillip.
James Laurie	United Kingdom	The ship foundered off the Abaco Islands between 1 and 7 April. She was on a voyage from Nassau, Bahamas to Liverpool, Lancashire.
Jeanies	United Kingdom	The ship was wrecked at Portrush, County Antrim with the loss of all hands. She was on a voyage from Ballysadare, County Sligo to Glasgow, Renfrewshire.
Johana Carolina	Netherlands	The ship was driven ashore at Camaret-sur-Mer, Finistère, Freance.
Lalla Roohk	United Kingdom	The ship was wrecked at "Elgy". Her crew were rescued. She was on a voyage from Newcastle upon Tyne, Northumberland to Quebec City, Lower Canada, British North America.
Lord Rodney	(United Kingdom of Great Britain and Ireland) New South Wales	The brig was wrecked at Wangaroa Harbour, New Zealand. Her crew were rescued.
Mayflower	United Kingdom	The ship was driven ashore in Loch Indaal before 6 April. She was on a voyage from the Clyde to Ballyshannon, County Donegal.
Ottawa	(United Kingdom of Great Britain and Ireland) British North America	The ship was wrecked on Anticosti Island, Lower Canada. All on board were rescued. She was on a voyage from Montreal, Lower Canada to London, United Kingdom.
Success	United Kingdom	The ship foundered in the English Channel 25 nautical miles (46 km) south west of Beachy Head, Sussex, She was on a voyage from Falmouth, Cornwall to London.
Thomas	United States	The brig was abandoned off Dielette, Manche, France before 6 April.
