= List of shipwrecks in July 1870 =

The list of shipwrecks in July 1870 includes ships sunk, foundered, grounded, or otherwise lost during July 1870.

== 1 July ==
List of shipwrecks: 1 July 1870
Ship	State	Description
Elizabeth and Sarah	United Kingdom	The brig foundered off the coast of Northumberland. Her crew were rescued by a steamship. She was on a voyage from Blyth, Northumberland to Kronstadt, Russia.
Margaret	United Kingdom	The ship sank in the Irish Sea off the coast of Lancashire. Her crew survived. She was on a voyage from Barrow in Furness, Lancashire to Ellesmere, Cheshire.
Silkstone	United Kingdom	The ship struck the pier at Havre de Grâce, Seine-Inférieure and was damaged. She was on a voyage from Hull, Yorkshire to Havre de Grâce.

== 2 July ==
List of shipwrecks: 2 July 1870
Ship	State	Description
Rapid	United Kingdom	The brig foundered in the Atlantic Ocean 40 nautical miles (74 km) south of Santo Antão, Cape Verde Islands. Her crew were rescued. She was on a voyage from Cádiz, Spain to Montevideo, Uruguay.
St. Leonard	United Kingdom	The ship foundered in the North Sea off Coquet Island, Northumberland. Her crew were rescued. She was on a voyage from Middlesbrough, Yorkshire to Berwick upon Tweed, Northumberland.
Unnamed	United Kingdom	The steamship ran aground and broke her back at Fleetwood, Lancashire.

== 3 July ==
List of shipwrecks: 3 July 1870
Ship	State	Description
Glaramara	United Kingdom	The ship was destroyed by fire at sea. She was on a voyage from the Clyde to Matanzas, Cuba.
Maria	United Kingdom	The ship sank off Little Orme Head, Caernarfonshire with the presumed loss of all hands.

== 4 July ==
List of shipwrecks: 4 July 1870
Ship	State	Description
Amy	United Kingdom	The ship ran aground on the Swanage Ledges, in the English Channel off the coast of Dorset.
Swift	United Kingdom	The schooner was wrecked on Heligoland. Her crew were rescued. She was on a voyage from Newcastle upon Tyne, Northumberland to Brake, Prussia.

== 5 July ==
List of shipwrecks: 5 July 1870
Ship	State	Description
Dove	United Kingdom	The brig collided with the schooner Skylark (United Kingdom) and sank in the North Sea off Huntcliffe Foot, Yorkshire with the loss of three of her seven crew. Survivors were rescued by Skylark. Dove was on a voyage from the River Tyne to London.
Langley	United Kingdom	The steamship ran aground north of Heligoland.

== 6 July ==
List of shipwrecks: 6 July 1870
Ship	State	Description
Alice	United Kingdom	The schooner was wrecked on the Oosterbank, in the North Sea off the coast of Zeeland, Netherlands. Her crew were rescued. She was on a voyage from Newcastle upon Tyne, Northumberland to Rotterdam, South Holland, Netherlands.

== 7 July ==
List of shipwrecks: 7 July 1870
Ship	State	Description
Hangesund	Norway	The sloop struck a sunken rock and foundered with the loss of a crew member.
Horton	United Kingdom	The brig was wrecked at Damietta, Egypt. Her crew were rescued. She was on a voyage from Cardiff, Glamorgan to Alexandria, Egypt.
Psyche	United Kingdom	The schooner departed from Plymouth, Devon for Saint John's, Newfoundland Colony. No further trace, presumed foundered with the loss of all hands.
Purus	Brazil	The steamship collided with the steamship Arary (Brazil) and sank in the Amazon River 20 nautical miles (37 km) downstream of Manaus with the loss of 131 of the 204 people on board. Survivors were rescued by Arary. Purus was on a voyage from Manaus to Madeira.

== 8 July ==
List of shipwrecks: 8 July 1870
Ship	State	Description
Bella	Canada	The schooner ran ashore at Cape Spencer, New Brunswick and was wrecked with the loss of her captain. She was on a voyage from Halifax, Nova Scotia to Sackville, New Brunswick.
Elisa Marie	France	The ship was wrecked near Buenos Aires, Argentina. She was on a voyage from Rio de Janeiro, Brazil to Buenos Aires.
Henry B. Wright	United States	The ship was driven ashore on Longpoint, Maine. She was on a voyage from Portland, Maine to Saint George, New Brunswick, Canada. She broke up the next day.
Laertes	Ottoman Empire	The paddle tug collided with the steamship Sphinx Austria-Hungary and sank at Galaţi.
Topaz	Canada	The brig ran ashore and was wrecked at Moriches, New York, United States. She was on a voyage from a port in the Newfoundland Colony to New York City, United States.

== 9 July ==
List of shipwrecks: 9 July 1870
Ship	State	Description
American Rose	United States	The ship was driven ashore north of Pernambuco, Brazil. She was on a voyage from Hamburg to an American port.
Brecis, or Prairie	Norway; Sweden	The brig was run into and sunk off Les Casquets, Channel Islands by the steamship Westphalia (Hamburg). Her seven crew were rescued by Westphalia. The brig was on a voyage from Morlaix, Finistère, France to Sunderland, County Durham, United Kingdom or Sundsvall, Sweden.
Laertes	Ottoman Empire	The tug collided with the steamship Sphinx (United Kingdom) and sank off "Saxa". She had been refloated by 31 July and beached in a capsized condition.
Lalla Rookh	United Kingdom	The sloop was driven ashore near Otterndorf, Prussia. She was on a voyage from Stornoway, Isle of Lewis, Outer Hebrides to Hamburg. She was refloated the next day and taken in to Hamburg.
Star of the Sea	United Kingdom	The yacht was driven ashore at Brouwershaven, Zeeland, Netherlands.
Woburn Abbey	United Kingdom	The ship was driven ashore north of Pernambuco. She was on a voyage from Cardiff, Glamorgan to Aden.

== 10 July ==
List of shipwrecks: 10 July 1870
Ship	State	Description
Esther Ann	New Zealand	The 30-ton schooner was hit by a sudden gale. She was hit broadside by a heavy sea and washed inshore near the mouth of the Hollyford River, New Zealand.
Hugo	Flag unknown	The barque was wrecked at "Porto Plata".

== 11 July ==
List of shipwrecks: 11 July 1870
Ship	State	Description
Black Prince	United Kingdom	The ship ran aground and capsized at Yokohama, Japan. She was on a voyage from Bangkok, Siam to Yokohama. She was righted and taken in to Yokohama.
Edward Hawkins	United Kingdom	The steamship caught fire at Kronstadt, Russia.

== 12 July ==
List of shipwrecks: 12 July 1870
Ship	State	Description
Kate	United Kingdom	The ship struck the Longships, Cornwall and was damaged. She was on a voyage from Llanelly, Glamorgan to Truro, Cornwall. She put in to Penzance, Cornwall in a leaky condition.

== 13 July ==
List of shipwrecks: 13 July 1870
Ship	State	Description
Catereau	New South Wales	The barque ran aground and was abandoned at Hokianga, New Zealand. She was on a voyage from Hokianga to Newcastle. She was subsequently boarded by a pilot and two Māoris, who intended to take her in to Auckland, New Zealand. No further trace, presumed foundered with their loss.
Labrador	(Dominion of Newfoundland) Newfoundland Colony	The steamship was driven ashore at Cape Whittle. She had been refloated by 17 July and taken in to "St. Augustin", Quebec, Canada in a severely leaky condition.

== 14 July ==
List of shipwrecks: 14 July 1870
Ship	State	Description
Alice	United Kingdom	The schooner was driven ashore on "Morris Island", Bahamas. She was on a voyage from Matanzas, Cuba to Nassau, Bahamas.
Elizabeth Fleming	United Kingdom	The ship caught fire in the Atlantic Ocean. She was abandoned the next day. All on board were rescued by Jerusalem (United Kingdom). Elizabeth Fleming was on a voyage from the Clyde to Rangoon, Burma. The wreck was towed in to Madeira by Lansdowne (United Kingdom).
Enigheden	Netherlands	The ship collided with Andrew Lovett (United States) off Texel, North Holland and was severely damaged. She was on a voyage from Riga, Russia to Amsterdam, North Holland. She was towed in to Texel in a severely leaky condition.
Favourite	United Kingdom	The schooner was wrecked on Tiree, Outer Hebrides with the loss of her captain.
Girv, and Stockton	Russia; United Kingdom	The brig Girv and the steamship Stockton collided at Dunkirk, Nord, France. Both vessels were severely damaged.

== 15 July ==
List of shipwrecks: 15 July 1870
Ship	State	Description
Centaur	United Kingdom	The ship struck a rock in the Pentland Firth. She put in to Phillip's Harbour where she ran aground and sank. She was on a voyage from Liverpool, Lancashire to Newcastle upon Tyne, Northumberland.
Graf von Bismark	Prussia	The ship was driven ashore near Maldonado, Uruguay. She was on a voyage from Buenos Aires, Argentina to an English port. She subsequently became a wreck.
Iskander Shah	India	The ship was driven ashore on Perim Island, Yemen Eyalet. She was on a voyage from Jeddah, Jeddah Eyalet to Calcutta. She was refloated with assistance from HMS Sind (Royal Navy) and taken in to Aden.
Nederlandsche Vlag	Netherlands	The ship was wrecked at Cape St. Francis, Cape Colony with the loss of thirteen of her crew. She was on a voyage from Macassar, Cape Colony to Amsterdam.
Ocean Belle	United Kingdom	The ship ran aground on the Kaloot Sandbank, in the North Sea off the coast of Zeeland, Netherlands.
Rangoon	United Kingdom	The ship was wrecked near Pratas Island. Her crew survived. She was on a voyage from Yokohama, Japan to Hong Kong.
Renfrewshire	United Kingdom	The steamship ran aground near Brodick, Isle of Arran. All on board were rescued by local ferry boats.
Senator	United Kingdom	The schooner struck a rock in the Pentland Firth off St. John's Point and sank at the entrance to Phillips's Harbour. She was on a voyage from Liverpool, Lancashire to Newcastle upon Tyne, Northumberland and/or South Shields, County Durham.
Simla	United Kingdom	The ship ran aground in the Hooghly River and capsized. She was on a voyage from Calcutta, India to London. She was righted and put back to Calcutta.

== 16 July ==
List of shipwrecks: 16 July 1870
Ship	State	Description
Berkshire	United Kingdom	The barque was run down and sunk by an American vessel with the loss of seven lives.
Calder	United Kingdom	The brig foundered in the Atlantic Ocean 60 nautical miles (110 km) horth east by east of Cape St. Vincent, Portugal (36°15′N 8°30′W). Her seven crew were rescued by the barque Celestina ( Trieste). Calder was on a voyage from Huelva, Spain to Newcastle upon Tyne, Northumberland.
Chilian	United Kingdom	The steamship ran aground in the Rock Channel and broke in two. She was on a voyage from Liverpool, Lancashire to New Orleans, Louisiana, United States. Subsequently salvaged, repaired and returned to service.
Governor General	United Kingdom	The ship foundered in the Pacific Ocean. Her crew survived. She was on a voyage from Payta, Peru to a British port.
Rake	United Kingdom	The schooner ran aground at Queen's Island, County Antrim. She was on a voyage from Belfast, County Antrim to a port in Cumberland. She was refloated.
San Nicolo	Russia	The ship ran aground and wrecked at Taganrog. She was on a voyage from Rostov-on-Don to Taganrog.

== 17 July ==
List of shipwrecks: 17 July 1870
Ship	State	Description
Leopard	United Kingdom	The steamship caught fire at London.
Mentor	United Kingdom	The brig was wrecked on the north coast of Cuba. She was on a voyage from Gibara, Cuba to Falmouth, Cornwall.

== 18 July ==
List of shipwrecks: 18 July 1870
Ship	State	Description
Elaine	United Kingdom	The steamship was destroyed by fire and sank at La Rochelle, Charente-Inférieure France. The wreck was refloated three days later. She was subsequently taken to Llanelly, Glamorgan.
Milbrook	United Kingdom	The barque was abandoned in the Atlantic Ocean. Her crew survived. She was on a voyage from Calicut, India to London.
Ocean Rover	United States	The clipper was wrecked on a reef off the mouth of the Goiana River, Brazil. Her crew were rescued. She was on a voyage from Hamburg to Bakers Island, Massachusetts.

== 19 July ==
List of shipwrecks: 19 July 1870
Ship	State	Description
Favourite	(United Kingdom of Great Britain and Ireland) Isle of Man	The ship sank off "Kinvara Head" with the loss of her captain. She was on a voyage from Liverpool, Lancashire to Peterhead, Aberdeenshire
Matta	United Kingdom	The ship was driven ashore in the Elbe downstream of Cuxhaven.
Oimara	United Kingdom	The yacht ran aground at "Ballymackormick Point". she was on a voyage from Belfast, County Antrim to the Clyde. She was refloated and resumed her voyage.
Scotia's Queen	United Kingdom	The barque struck the Stag Rocks and sank. Her crew survived. She was on a voyage from Odesa, Russia to Sunderland, County Durham.
Tarifa	United Kingdom	The steamship was driven ashore in Ballycronen Bay. She was on a voyage from Liverpool, Lancashire to New York, United States. She was refloated and taken in to Queenstown, County Cork.

== 20 July ==
List of shipwrecks: 20 July 1870
Ship	State	Description
Hartfield	United Kingdom	The full-rigged ship ran aground off Canovier Point, Mauritius. She was on a voyage from the Clyde to Mauritius. She was refloated and taken in to Mauritius in a leaky condition.
Robert Edwards	United States	The whaler was set afire by four of her crew. She was abandoned in the Atlantic Ocean on 22 July. Her crew were rescued by the brig Mary Rice (United States). Those who had set the ship afire were arrested and taken to New York to stand trial.
Sophie	United Kingdom	The brigantine ran ashore at St. Govan's Head, Pembrokeshire. She was on a voyage from Newport, Monmouthshire to Liverpool, Lancashire.

== 21 July ==
List of shipwrecks: 21 July 1870
Ship	State	Description
Tyne Queen	United Kingdom	The steamship struck rocks in the Isles of Scilly and was beached on St. Helen's. She was on a voyage from Cardiff, Glamorgan to Marseille, Bouches-du-Rhône, France. She was refloated in early August.
Wave	United Kingdom	The ship was driven ashore in the River Bann. She was on a voyage from Troon, Ayrshire to Coleraine, County Antrim.

== 22 July ==
List of shipwrecks: 22 July 1870
Ship	State	Description
Breiz Izel	United Kingdom	The ship was holed by her anchor and was beached at Cardiff, Glamorgan. She was on a voyage from Cardiff to Galle, Ceylon.
Dona Anita	Spain	The barque was wrecked on the coast of Panay, Spanish East Indies. Her crew were rescued. She was on a voyage from Manila, Spanish East Indies to Falmouth, Cornwall, United Kingdom of Great Britain and Ireland.
Lumbley	United Kingdom	The steamship was driven ashore and wrecked on Brecqhou, Channel Islands. Her crew were rescued.
Morning Star	United Kingdom	The ship ran aground 35 nautical miles (65 km) west of Cape Guardafui, Majeerteen Sultanate. A crew member was murdered by the local inhabitants, who plundered the vessel. She was on a voyage from Liverpool, Lancashire to Aden. She was refloated.
Pharo	United Kingdom	The schooner was severely damaged by an onboard explosion at Sunderland, County Durham.
Sappho	United Kingdom	The schooner was driven ashore at St. Govan's Head, Pembrokeshire. She was on a voyage from Newport, Monmouthshire to Liverpool. She was refloated and found to be severely leaky.

== 23 July ==
List of shipwrecks: 23 July 1870
Ship	State	Description
Alix	France	The schooner collided with the steamship Glencairn (United Kingdom) and sank at Dunkirk, Nord. Her crew were rescued. She was on a voyage from Dunkirk to Cherbourg, Seine-Inférieure.
Gaspe	Flag unknown	The steamship collided with another vessel and sank at Auckland, New Zealand.
Enterprise	New Zealand	The ketch was destroyed after colliding with the steamer Tauranga (New Zealand) in Hauraki Gulf. The crew survived in the ship's longboat. The Tauranga was also lost several days later as a result of the accident (see below).
Warren	United States	The barque was sighted off Beachy Head, Sussex, United Kingdom whilst on a voyage from Antwerp, Belgium to New York. No further trace, presumed foundered with the loss of all hands.

== 24 July ==
List of shipwrecks: 24 July 1870
Ship	State	Description
Aurifern	New South Wales	The ship foundered. She was on a voyage from Newcastle to New Caledonia.
Hamlet	United Kingdom	The schooner was wrecked on Watling Island, Bahamas. She was on a voyage from Cuba to a port in Delaware, United States.
Margaret Ann	United Kingdom	The ship ran aground on the Uddern Rock. She was on a voyage from Neath, Glamorgan to Seaton, Devon. She was refloated and put in to Fowey, Cornwall, where she arrived on 26 July.
Ottawa	Canada	The ship ran aground at Trois-Rivières, Quebec. She was on a voyage from Montreal, Quebec to Glasgow, Renfrewshire, United Kingdom. She was refloated on 26 July.

== 25 July ==
List of shipwrecks: 25 July 1870
Ship	State	Description
Ben Muick Dhui	United Kingdom	The barque ran aground and sank on Scharhörn, Hamburg. Her crew survived.
Coundon	United Kingdom	The brig was driven ashore and sank at Whitby, Yorkshire.
Disney	United Kingdom	The ship was abandoned off Port Isaac, Cornwall. She was on a voyage from Newport, Monmouthshire to Wadebridge, Cornwall. She came ashore 2 nautical miles (3.7 km) east of Port Isaac and was wrecked.
Jane Martin	United Kingdom	The ship was wrecked on the Fillen Sand, in the North Sea. Her crew were rescued. She was on a voyage from Mazatlán, Mexico to Hamburg.
Mary and Jane	United Kingdom	The schooner ran aground on the Whitby Rock. She was refloated and towed in to Whitby by the Whitby Lifeboat Lucy ( Royal National Lifeboat Institution) and a steamship.
Prince Albert	United Kingdom	The sloop foundered off the coast of Lincolnshire. Her four crew reached the shore in a boat.
Scottish Bride	United Kingdom	The barque was dighted off Gibraltar whilst on a voyage from Licata, Sicily, Italy to New York. No further trace, presumed foundered with the loss of all hands.
True Blue	United Kingdom	The brigantine was driven ashore and sank at Whitby.
Veracity	United Kingdom	Franco-Prussian War: The brig ran aground on Kleine Vogelsand, in the North Sea due to navigational aids having been removed by the Prussians. She was abandoned by her crew, who were rescued by the steamship Gitana (United Kingdom). Veracity was on a voyage from Newcastle upon Tyne, Northumberland to Cuxhaven. She was refloated and taken in to Cuxhaven, where she sank.

== 26 July ==
List of shipwrecks: 26 July 1870
Ship	State	Description
Active	United Kingdom	The yacht ran aground on the Crusader Sandbank, in the Irish Sea off the coast of Lancashire. Three of her four crew were taken off by the Blackpool Lifeboat Robert William ( Royal National Lifeboat Institution), which put two of her crew aboard. Active was beached at Blackpool, Lancashire.
Amalia	(Netherlands) Curaçao and Dependencies	The ship foundered in the Atlantic Ocean. Her crew survived. She was on a voyage from Curaçao to Liverpool, Lancashire.
Biddick, and Elaine	United Kingdom	The steam collier Biddick collided with the steamship Elaine in the River Thames at Northfleet, Kent. Both vessels were beached. Elaine was on a voyage from the Baltic to London.
Eva	United Kingdom	The barque was wrecked at Old Calabar, Africa. Her crew were rescued.
Fusi Yama	United Kingdom	The barque was run into and sunk off Lizard Point in the English Channel by Liverpool (United States. Fusi Yama sank in only a few minutes after the collision with the loss of five of her crew. Survivors were rescued by Liverpool. Fusi Yama was on a voyage from London to Hong Kong.

== 27 July ==
List of shipwrecks: 27 July 1870
Ship	State	Description
Julie	(Netherlands) Curaçao and Dependencies	The barque was abandoned 20 nautical miles (37 km) off Catalina Island, Dominican Republic. Her crew survived. She was on a voyage from Curaçao to Liverpool, Lancashire, United Kingdom.
London	United Kingdom	The steamship was severely damaged by an onboard explosion. She was on a voyage from Sunderland, County Durham to Patras, Greece. She put back to Sunderland for repairs.
Wings of the Morning	United Kingdom	The fishing smack sprang a leak and foundered on the North Sea 7 nautical miles (13 km) south east by east of Dimlington, Yorkshire. Her crew were rescued by the tug Arrow (United Kingdom).

== 28 July ==
List of shipwrecks: 28 July 1870
Ship	State	Description
Curlew	United Kingdom	The yacht was run into by the schooner Red (United Kingdom) and sank at Beaumaris, Anglesey. Her crew were rescued by Red.
Flora	United Kingdom	The steamship ran aground near the mouth of the River Carron. She was on a voyage from Havre de Grâce, Seine-Inférieure, France to Grangemouth, Stirlingshire. She was refloated with the assistance of a tug.
Fuschia	United Kingdom	The brig ran aground on the Barber Sand, in the North Sea off the coast of Suffolk. She was refloated and assisted in to Lowestoft, Suffolk in a leaky condition.
Reaper	(United Kingdom of Great Britain and Ireland) Isle of Man	The schooner was wrecked at Peel. She was on a voyage from Runcorn, Cheshire to Aberdeen. She had been refloated by 13 August and taken in to Peel for repairs.
Right Way	United States	The steamboat exploded and sank in the Bayou Lafourche with the loss of nine lives.
Vooruitgang	Netherlands	The ship was driven ashore and wrecked north of the mouth of the Rio Grande.

== 29 July ==
List of shipwrecks: 29 July 1870
Ship	State	Description
Ann Wilson	United Kingdom	The ship was driven into Eleazer and Sanspareil (both United States) and then ran aground at New Liverpool, North Carolina, United States. She was refloated.
Ava	United Kingdom	The ship ran aground in the North Sea. She was on a voyage from Hartlepool, County Durham to Leer, Prussia. She put in to Texel, North Holland, Netherlands in a leaky condition.
Harlech Castle	United Kingdom	The ship foundered 60 nautical miles (110 km) south of Cape Howe, New South Wales with the loss of all hands. She was on a voyage from Melbourne, Victoria to Newcastle, New South Wales.
Harmina	Hamburg	The ship foundered in the Dogger Bank. She was on a voyage from Hamburg to Elbing.
Romulus	United Kingdom	The pilot boat, a skiff, was run down and sunk in the Bristol Channel off Lundy Island, Devon by the barque Fairway (United Kingdom). Her crew were rescued.

== 31 July ==
List of shipwrecks: 31 July 1870
Ship	State	Description
Don	United Kingdom	The schooner put in to Montrose, Forfarshire on fire and sank there. She was on a voyage from Sunderland, County Durham to Aberdeen.
Eamont	United Kingdom	The ship was driven ashore. She was on a voyage from Gävle, Sweden to London. She was refloated and towed in to Harwich, Essex in a waterlogged condition.

== Unknown date ==
List of shipwrecks: Unknown date in July 1870
Ship	State	Description
Abeona	United Kingdom	The ship was driven ashore at Trois Rivières, Quebec Canada before 6 July. She was on a voyage from Glasgow, Renfrewshire to Montreal, Quebec.
Alice Vennard	United States	The ship was damaged by fire at Valparaíso, Chile.
Algas	Flag unknown	The ship was wrecked on Novaya Zemlya, Russia.
Anna	United Kingdom	The ship was driven ashore near Messina, Sicily, Italy. She was on a voyage from Newport, Monmouthshire to Corfu, Greece. She was refloated.
Annie Nelson	United Kingdom	The barque was driven ashore and wrecked at Valparaíso between 11 and 13 July.
Ascensione	Argentina	The ship ran aground in the River Thames. She was on a voyage from Buenos Airesn to London, United Kingdom.
Atlantic	Canada	The whaler, a schooner, was sunk by ice off "American Harbour", Greenland. Her crew were rescued.
Bianca Giattorno	Italy	The brig collided with Vice-Ammiraglio Tegetthoff (Italy) and sank off Andros, Greece.
Blackboy	United Kingdom	The steamship was driven ashore on Bardsey Island, Pembrokeshire. She was on a voyage from Glasgow to Bristol, Gloucestershire. She was refloated and resumed her voyage.
Bonasola	Italy	The barque foundered in the Atlantic Ocean. Fifteen people were rescued. She was on a voyage from Buenos Aires, Argentina to Antwerp, Belgium.
Cesar	France	The ship ran aground in the Gironde. She was on a voyage from Bordeaux, Gironde to Valencia, Spain.
Ellida	United Kingdom	The ship sprang a leak and was beached on "Svfellandsodde". She was on a voyage from a Scottish port to Korsør, Denmark.
Embla	Flag unknown	The ship capsized in the North Sea before 18 July.
Emilie	Russia	The ship was driven ashore and wrecked on the east coast of Bornholm, Denmark. She was on a voyage from Danzig to Fredrikshavn, Denmark.
Emily	South Australia	The two-masted schooner was wrecked at Indented Head, Victoria.
England	United Kingdom	The ship was driven ashore at Maldonado, Uruguay.
Expresse	Sweden	The ship sank in the Baltic Sea south of Öland. Her crew were rescued. She was on a voyage from Norrbotten to an English port.
Felix	France	The ship was abandoned at sea before 27 July. She was on a voyage from Marseille, Bouches-du-Rhône to Pernambuco, Brazil.
Fremad Scillae	Flag unknown	The ship was wrecked at Novaya Zemlya.
Galilei	United Kingdom	The ship capsized at Newport.
Gattorono	Italy	The brig collided with Vici Ammuragtio (Italy) and sank off Andros, Greece.
Gem	United Kingdom	The ship collided with Meteor (United Kingdom) and sank on or before 2 July. Her crew were rescued by Meteor. Gem was on a voyage from Quebec City, Canada to Swansea, Glamorgan.
Guiding Star	United Kingdom	The ship was driven ashore. She was on a voyage from Bergen, Norway to Arkhangelsk, Russia. She was refloated and put back to Bergen in a severely damaged condition.
Haomatao	Siam	The ship was plundered and burnt in the South China Sea by Chinese pirates. She was on a voyage from Bangkok to "Hohio".
Hendrika	Netherlands	The barque foundered off Cape Agulhas, Cape Colony before 6 July.
Herman Becker	Flag unknown	The ship ran aground at the mouth of the Tonalá River.
Inverness-shire	United Kingdom	The schooner was driven ashore at Eyemouth, Berwickshire. She was on a voyage from South Shields, County Durham to Inverness. She was refloated and resumed her voyage.
Jane Blyth	United Kingdom	The ship ran aground on the Tillen, in the North Sea. Her crew were rescued. She was on a voyage from Mazatlán, Cuba to Hamburg. She was refloated and taken in to Heligoland.
Jager	United Kingdom	The ship foundered. She was on a voyage from the Río Negro to Falmouth, Cornwall.
J. E. Lincoln	United States	The ship was wrecked on the Cayo Cruz del Padre, Cuba. She was on a voyage from Havana to Caibarién, Cuba.
J. E. Woodworth	United States	The ship was damaged by fire. She was on a voyage from Boston, Massachusetts to Liverpool, Lancashire, United Kingdom.
Juan	Spain	The ship ran aground at Harbour Grace, Newfoundland Colony. She was on a voyage from Cádiz to Harbour Grace.
Julie	Sweden	The ship was driven ashore on Öland. She was on a voyage from Stockholm to Havre de Grâce, Seine-Inférieure, France.
Kathleen	Canada	The schooner was driven ashore. She was on a voyage from Saint John, New Brunswick to New York. She was refloated and put back to Saint John, where she arrived on 8 July.
L. H.	United Kingdom	The ship was lost in the Chacao Channel.
Lotus	United Kingdom	The schooner departed from Plymouth for a port in the Newfoundland Colony. No further trace, presumed foundered with the loss of all hands.
HMS Maeander	Royal Navy	The sailing frigate foundered in a gale in the South Atlantic Ocean off Ascension Island at 7°54′45″S 14°24′24″W.
Maria	Italy	The barque was destroyed by fire on the Brazilian coast.
Maria Ferguson	United States	The ship ran aground in the Bay of Fundy. She was on a voyage from New York to Windsor, Nova Scotia, Canada.
Marie Juliet	Canada	The ship foundered. She was on a voyage from Montreal to New York.
Marietta M.	Austria-Hungary	The ship was wrecked on Diamond Island, India. She was on a voyage rom Bassein, India to a European port.
Mary Lizzie	United Kingdom	The ship was driven ashore at "Beauduc", Bouches-du-Rhône, France.
Mathilde	France	The smack was wrecked near "Jamatave". Her crew were rescued. She was on a voyage from Mauritius to Réunion and "Mahanero".
Mischief	(Canada)	The schooner was wrecked in the Cayman Islands. She was on a voyage from Cienfuegos, Cuba to Halifax, Nova Scotia.
Mudlark	United Kingdom	The steam dredger caught fire in the River Bann and was scuttled. She was refloated.
Nonantum	United Kingdom	The ship ran aground on the Maryland Reef. She was on a voyage from New Orleans, Louisiana to Liverpool. She was refloated on 12 July. Nonantum was subsequently placed under repair.
Ocean Rose	United States	The barque was driven ashore and wrecked about 25 nautical miles (46 km) north of Pernambuco before 19 July. She was on a voyage from Hamburg to an American port.
Pellegrina Madre	Flag unknown	The ship was driven ashore at Hill Point, County Waterford, United Kingdom.
Peppina	Greece	The ship was wrecked off Lemnos.
Phoenix	France	The ship was abandoned at sea. She was on a voyage from Marseille to Pernambuco.
Prairie Rose	United Kingdom	The ship was destroyed by fire at sea. Her crew were rescued. She was on a voyage from the Rio Grande do Sul to Liverpool.
Rob Roy	United Kingdom	The brigantine was abandoned in the Atlantic Ocean before 30 July. She was on a voyage from Dalhousie, New Brunswick to Sligo. She was taken in to Paspébiac, Quebec.
Sapphire	(United Kingdom of Great Britain and Ireland) Trinidad	The cutter was wrecked in The Bocas Islands. She was on a voyage from Trinidad to Barbados.
Senator	United States	The ship was wrecked near Musquash, New Brunswick. She was on a voyage from Boston, Massachusetts to the Salmon River, New Brunswick.
Star	United Kingdom	The Mersey Flat sank in the Horse Channel.
Tauranga	New Zealand	The steamer collided with the ketch Enterprise in the Hauraki Gulf on 23 July (see above), and continued on its course apparently unscathed, but failed to arrive at its destination. Nothing was ever found of the 18 people on board, though a dog, thought to be that of the ship's captain, was rescued from Sail Rock, near Bream Bay at the end of July. On 4 August a lifeboat probably belonging to the Tauranga was found capsized near Pakiri.
Tchally	Flag unknown	The ship was lost off "Puntaarenas", United States of Colombia. Her crew were rescued.
Tennessee	United States	The steamship was abandoned at sea.
Tity	(Ottoman Empire) Egypt	The tug foundered 30 nautical miles (56 km) off Alexandria. Her crew were rescued.
Uncas	United Kingdom	The ship was wrecked at Cape La Have, Nova Scotia. She was on a voyage from New HYork to a port in Nova Scotia.
United Kingdom	United Kingdom	The ship collided with Bengal (United States) and sank in the Atlantic Ocean.
Venner	Norway	The ship struck a sunken rock and was holed. She was on a voyage from a Norwegian port to Paimbœuf, Loire-Inférieure, France. She was towed in to Brest, Finistère, France in a severely damaged and waterlogged condition.
Virginia	United States	The steamship was driven ashore at Havre de Grâce, Seine-Inférieure, France. She was on a voyage from New York to Havre de Grâce. She was refloated.
Voorlichter	Netherlands	The ship capsized at Rotterdam, South Holland.
Zeggia	United Kingdom	The ship was wrecked in the Cape Verde Islands. She was on a voyage from Liverpool to Sierra Leone.
Zenobia	United Kingdom	The ship was driven ashore at Imbros, Ottoman Empire. she was on a voyage from Cardiff to Constantinople, Ottoman Empire. She was refloated.
17 de Mai	Norway	The ship capsized at Waterford, United Kingdom.
Unnamed	Hamburg	The steamship collided with the brig Adieu (France) and sank in the Elbe.
