= List of shipwrecks in July 1836 =

The list of shipwrecks in July 1836 includes ships sunk, foundered, wrecked, grounded, or otherwise lost during July 1836.

== 1 July ==
List of shipwrecks: 1 July 1836
Ship	State	Description
Berendina Sophia	Netherlands	The ship foundered off Schiermonnikoog, Groningen. Her crew were rescued. She was on a voyage from Newcastle upon Tyne, Northumberland, United Kingdom to Rotterdam, South Holland.

== 3 July ==
List of shipwrecks: 3 July 1836
Ship	State	Description
Effort	United Kingdom	The ship was driven ashore and severely damaged at Tarbert, Argyllshire. She was on a voyage from Cardiff, Glamorgan to Limerick. Effort was refloated on 15 July and taken in to Limerick for repairs.
Louisa Maria	United Kingdom	The ship was driven ashore near Ensenada, Argentina. She was on a voyage from Liverpool, Lancashire to Buenos Aires, Argentina. Louisa Maria was refloated on 18 July.

== 5 July ==
List of shipwrecks: 5 July 1836
Ship	State	Description
Orozimbo	United Kingdom	The ship ran aground in the Mississippi River. She was on a voyage from Liverpool, Lancashire to New Orleans, Louisiana, United States.

== 6 July ==
List of shipwrecks: 6 July 1836
Ship	State	Description
Genevese	France	The ship was driven ashore at Island Beach, New Jersey, United States. She was on a voyage from Marseille, Bouches-du-Rhône to New York, United States.

== 7 July ==
List of shipwrecks: 7 July 1836
Ship	State	Description
Adelaide	United Kingdom	The ship was wrecked on "Cape Cuerpon", Newfoundland, British North America with the loss of eight of her crew. She was on a voyage from Bristol, Gloucestershire to Labrador, British North America.

== 8 July ==
List of shipwrecks: 8 July 1836
Ship	State	Description
Richard Battly	United Kingdom	The ship was wrecked on the Haisborough Sands, in the North Sea off the coast of Norfolk. Her crew were rescued. She was on a voyage from Licata, Sicily to Newcastle upon Tyne, Northumberland.
Travemünde	Lübeck	The ship was wrecked at Dragør, Denmark. She was on a voyage from Lübeck to Saint Petersburg, Russia.

== 9 July ==
List of shipwrecks: 9 July 1836
Ship	State	Description
Charlotte Douglas	United Kingdom	The ship ran aground on the Whale Head Reef, in Gaspé Bay and was wrecked with the loss of three lives. She was on a voyage from Londonderry to Gaspé, Lower Canada, British North America.
Ranger	United Kingdom	The ship was driven ashore at Bellechasse, Lower Canada, British North America before 13 August. She was on a voyage from Waterford to Quebec City, Lower Canada. Ranger was later refloated, but was condemned.
Regina	Stettin	The ship was wrecked on the Anholt Reef, in the Baltic Sea. She was on a voyage from Newcastle upon Tyne, Northumberland, United Kingdom to Stettin.
Stranraer	United Kingdom	The ship was driven ashore in the Strait of Belle Isle. Her crew were rescued. She was on a voyage from Quebec City, Lower Canada, British North America to Stranraer, Wigtownshire. Stranraer was refloated in mid-August and taken in to a port in Newfoundland.

== 10 July ==
List of shipwrecks: 10 July 1836
Ship	State	Description
Alexander	United States	The ship was wrecked in the Caicos Islands. Her crew were rescued. She was on a voyage from Wilmington, Delaware to Jamaica.
Atlantic	United Kingdom	The ship collided with Ocean (United Kingdom) off "St. Peter's Island" and foundered. Her crew were rescued. She was on a voyage from Newfoundland to Quebec City, Lower Canada, British North America.
Whitwell Grange	United Kingdom	The ship sprang a leak and was beached at Stromness, Orkney Islands. She was on a voyage from Sunderland, County Durham to Miramichi, New Brunswick, British North America.

== 11 July ==
List of shipwrecks: 11 July 1836
Ship	State	Description
Braganza	Spain	The ship foundered in the Atlantic Ocean. Her crew were rescued. She was on a voyage from Cádiz to Bath, Maine, United States.
John and Elizabeth	United Kingdom	The ship was holed by her anchor in the River Tees and was beached. She was refloated on 14 July and taken in to South Shields, County Durham for repairs.
Mandvaille	United Kingdom	The ship departed from Portobelo, Republic of New Granada for Jamaica. No further trace, presumed foundered with the loss of all hands.

== 13 July ==
List of shipwrecks: 13 July 1836
Ship	State	Description
Emerald	United Kingdom	The ship was destroyed by fire at New York, United States. She was on a voyage from New York to Liverpool, Lancashire.

== 14 July ==
List of shipwrecks: 14 July 1836
Ship	State	Description
Dorothy	United Kingdom	The ship was driven ashore and capsized in Plettenberg Bay.
Gentil Americano	Brazil	The ship capsized whilst on a voyage from Pernambuco to Bahia with the loss of seven lives.
Phœbus and Jane	United Kingdom	The schooner was lost on the coast of Labrador, British North America.
Pitt	United Kingdom	The barque was driven ashore and damaged in Girvan Bay.

== 17 July ==
List of shipwrecks: 17 July 1836
Ship	State	Description
Bruce	United Kingdom	The ship was driven ashore and damaged at Dublin. She was on a voyage from Newcastle upon Tyne, Northumberland to Dublin. Bruce was later refloated and taken in to Dublin.
Caledonia	United Kingdom	The schooner sprang a leak and foundered in the North Sea 15 nautical miles (28 km) south east of Berwick upon Tweed, Northumberland. All eight people took to the boat. They were rescued the next day by Quebec (United Kingdom). Caledonia was on a voyage from Aberdeen to South Shields, County Durham.
Victors	United States	The ship was wrecked on the Mayaguana Reef. She was on a voyage from New York to Jamaica.

== 18 July ==
List of shipwrecks: 18 July 1836
Ship	State	Description
Amelia	(United Kingdom of Great Britain and Ireland) British North America	The ship was run down and sunk by Esk (United Kingdom).
Doncaster	United Kingdom	The East Indiaman, a barque, was wrecked at Cape Agulhas, Africa with the loss of all 64 people on board. She was on a voyage from Mauritius to London.
Mary Ann	Hamburg	The ship capsized off Schiermonnikoog, Groningen, Netherlands. Her crew were rescued. She was on a voyage from Stromness, Orkney Islands, United Kingdom to Hamburg.

== 19 July ==
List of shipwrecks: 19 July 1836
Ship	State	Description
Anna	United Kingdom	The ship foundered in the Irish Sea 4 nautical miles (7.4 km) north north west of the mouth of the River Ribble with the loss of two of her five crew. She was on a voyage from Ulverston, Lancashire to Flint.

== 20 July ==
List of shipwrecks: 20 July 1836
Ship	State	Description
Sun	United Kingdom	The ship was abandoned off Cape Sable Island, Nova Scotia, British North America. She was on a voyage from Quebec City, Lower Canada, British North America to Gloucester.

== 21 July ==
List of shipwrecks: 21 July 1836
Ship	State	Description
Alexander	Netherlands	The ship was wrecked on the Hinder Bank, in the North Sea. She was on a voyage from Surinam to Rotterdam, South Holland.
Scotia	United Kingdom	The ship was driven ashore near Minde, Norway. Her crew were rescued. She was on a voyage from Wick, Caithness to Hamburg.

=== 22 July ===
List of shipwrecks: 22 July 1836
Ship	State	Description
Clio	United Kingdom	The ship was lost near White Island, New York, United States. She was on a voyage from New York City to Quebec City, Lower Canada, British North America.
Matilda	United Kingdom	The ship ran aground ran aground on Neckman's Ground, in the Baltic Sea off Dragør, Denmark and capsized. Her crew were rescued. She was on a voyage from Saint Petersburg, Russia to London.

== 23 July ==
List of shipwrecks: 23 July 1836
Ship	State	Description
Royal Clarence	United Kingdom	The ship was driven ashore and wrecked at Dungeness, Kent.

== 24 July ==
List of shipwrecks: 24 July 1836
Ship	State	Description
Ann	United Kingdom	The ship was driven ashore at Ostend, West Flanders, Belgium.
Elspeth	United Kingdom	The ship was wrecked on The Skerries, off the coast of County Antrim. Her crew were rescued. She was on a voyage from Newcastle upon Tyne, Northumberland to Galway.
Friends	United Kingdom	The ship struck The Shingles, off the Isle of Wight and sank. Her crew were rescued. She was on a voyage from Guernsey, Channel Islands to London.
Lunar	Hamburg	The ship was driven ashore at Cuxhaven. She was on a voyage from Havana, Cuba to Hamburg.Lunar was later refloated and taken in to Hamburg.
William	United Kingdom	The ship was driven ashore at Rye, Sussex.

== 25 July ==
List of shipwrecks: 25 July 1836
Ship	State	Description
Palmer	United Kingdom	The ship was driven ashore at Workington, Cumberland.
Wilkinson	United Kingdom	The ship was driven ashore at Workington. She was on a voyage from Liverpool, Lancashire to Ireland.

== 26 July ==
List of shipwrecks: 26 July 1836
Ship	State	Description
Electra	United Kingdom	The brig capsized in the River Tay. She was later righted and taken in to Perth for repairs.
James	United Kingdom	The ship was driven ashore at Allonby, Cumberland. She was on a voyage from Bathurst, New South Wales to Maryport, Cumberland.
Johanna Gertrude	Netherlands	The ship was driven ashore and wrecked at Crosby, Lancashire, United Kingdom. She was on a voyage from Liverpool, Lancashire to Rotterdam, South Holland.

== 27 July ==
List of shipwrecks: 27 July 1836
Ship	State	Description
Anna Dorothea	Norway	The ship was driven ashore east of Folkestone, Kent, United Kingdom. She was on a voyage from Trondheim to Havre de Grâce, Seine-Inférieure, France. Anna Dorothea was later refloated and taken in to Ramsgate, Kent.
Fortuna	Flag unknown	The ship was driven ashore east of Folkestone. She was on a voyage from "Borgo" to Cádiz, Spain. Fortuna was later refloated and taken in to Ramsgate.
Frow Malia	Netherlands	The ship was driven ashore east of Folkestone. She was on a voyage from Amsterdam, North Holland to Nantes, Loire-Inférieure. Fra Maitra was later refloated and taken in to Dover, Kent.
New York	United States	The ship ran aground and was damaged at Greenock, Renfrewshire, United Kingdom. She was on a voyage from Greenock to New York. She was later refloated and taken in to Greenock.

== 28 July ==
List of shipwrecks: 28 July 1836
Ship	State	Description
Amelia Matilda	United Kingdom	The ship was driven ashore and severely damaged at the mouth of the Old Calabar River. She was on a voyage from Liverpool, Lancashire to Old Calabar, Africa. Amelia Matilda was refloated on 30 July.

== 29 July ==
List of shipwrecks: 29 July 1836
Ship	State	Description
Catharine	United Kingdom	The ship schooner was driven ashore at Thorntonloch, Lothian.
Grecian	United Kingdom	The ship was driven ashore at South Shields, County Durham.
Hannah	United Kingdom	The brig was abandoned in the Atlantic Ocean 100 nautical miles (190 km) east south east of Cape Breton Island, Nova Scotia, British North America with the loss of seven of her twelve crew. Survivors were rescued by Volunteer (United Kingdom). Hannah was on a voyage from Rimouski, Lower Canada, British North America to London.
John Welsh	United Kingdom	The ship struck the Hoyle Bank and was subsequently wrecked on the Dove Spit, in Liverpool Bay with the loss of fourteen of her sixteen crew. She was on a voyage from Savanilla, near Puerto Colombia, to Jamaica and Liverpool, Lancashire. The survivors were rescued by the Hoylake Lifeboat.
Lamb	United Kingdom	The ship was driven ashore and severely damaged at Alnmouth, Northumberland.
William	United Kingdom	The schooner was wrecked on the Red Wharf Bank, in the Irish Sea, with the loss of all hands. She was on a voyage from Dublin to Chester, Cheshire.

== 30 July ==
List of shipwrecks: 30 July 1836
Ship	State	Description
Fame	United Kingdom	The ship was driven ashore at Whitby, Yorkshire. She was on a voyage from Stockton-on-Tees, County Durham to Whitby.

== 31 July ==
List of shipwrecks: 31 July 1836
Ship	State	Description
Adelaide	United Kingdom	The ship foundered in a typhoon in the China Sea.
Admiraal Buikes	Netherlands	The ship was wrecked in the Ladrone Islands with the loss of all but seven of her crew.
Aurora	United Kingdom	The ship foundered in a typhoon in the China Sea.
Girard	United States	The ship foundered in a typhoon in the China Sea. She was on a voyage from China to Manila, Spanish East Indies.
General Buskels	(Spain) Spanish East Indies	The ship was lost off the Ladrone Islands in a typhoon.
Harmoody	India	The ship foundered in a typhoon off the Ladrone islands. She was on a voyage from Bombay to China.
Hermitage	India	The ship was lost off the Ladrone Islands in a typhoon.
Hormanjee Bomanjee	India	The ship foundered in a typhoon in the China Sea. She was on a voyage from Bombay to China.
Isabella	United Kingdom	The ship was lost off the Ladrone Islands in a typhoon.
Lalla Rookh	United Kingdom	The ship sprang a leak in the Atlantic Ocean and was abandoned. She was on a voyage from Miramichi, New Brunswick, British North America to Waterford.
Margaret Graham	United Kingdom	The ship was lost off the Ladrone Islands in a typhoon.
Naples Packet	United Kingdom	The ship ran aground on the Sunk Sand, in the North Sea and was damaged. She was on a voyage from Newcastle upon Tyne, Northumberland to Naples, Kingdom of the Two Sicilies. Naples Packet was later refloated and taken in to Hamburg.
Susanna	United Kingdom	The ship was wrecked in the Ladrone Islands with the loss of eleven of her crew. She was on a voyage from Bombay to Canton, China.
Susannah	Portugal	The barque was driven ashore and wrecked at "Tyloo", 20 nautical miles (37 km) south east of Macau with the loss of eleven of her crew.

== Unknown date ==
List of shipwrecks: Unknown date 1836
Ship	State	Description
Adventure	(United Kingdom of Great Britain and Ireland) New South Wales	The sloop was wrecked of the coast of New South Wales.
Harmony	United Kingdom	The ship ran aground and sank on the Middle Sand, in the North Sea. She was later refloated and taken in to Whitstable, Kent.
Jane	United Kingdom	The sloop sprang a leak in the North Sea and was beached near Peterhead, Aberdeenshire, where she was wrecked.
Johanna	Flag unknown	The ship was wrecked at Memel, Prussia.
John	United Kingdom	The ship was wrecked near Peterhead, Aberdeenshire. She was on a voyage from Peterhead to Montrose, Forfarshire.
Juno	Prussia	The ship was driven ashore at Cape Arkona. She was on a voyage from Stralsund to Liverpool, Lancashire, United Kingdom. Juno was refloated on 26 July and taken in to Stralsund.
Louise	Bremen	The ship was abandoned in the Atlantic Ocean before 28 July. She was later towed in to Santander, Spain by James Watt (United Kingdom).
New Zealander	New Zealand	The brigantine was wrecked in heavy weather off Māhia Peninsula after her anchor chain broke, on or around July 8. She was loaded with maize and pork, and en route to Sydney.
Orestes	United Kingdom	The ship ran aground in the Hooghly River. She was on a voyage from Calcutta, India to China. Orestes was later refloated and put back to Calcutta.
Palmer	United Kingdom	The ship was driven ashore at Workington, Cumberland before 30 July. She was refloated on 31 July and taken in to Workington.
Wilkinson	United Kingdom	The ship was driven ashore at Workington before 30 July. She was on a voyage from Liverpool to and Irish port. Wilkinson was refloated on 31 July and taken in to Workington.
