= List of ships named Lalla Rookh =

The name Lalla Rookh, the heroine of an 1817 poem titled Lalla Rookh by Thomas Moore, has been given to a number of ships:

== Lalla Rookh (1823 ship) ==
A 380-ton sailing vessel. Sailed first to Charleston on 1 September 1823, under Captain Hugh Stewart, and subsequently to Rio de Janeiro and other ports in Brazil. Also under Stewart she sailed to Sydney, Brisbane, Singapore, and Penang. On 5 June 1826, with Lalla Rookh described as "the fine new ship, burthen 400 tons", (Note: Refitted?) she sailed to Madras, Penang and Singapore under Stewart.

From 5 November 1827 she appears as travelling to Madras, Penang and Singapore under the command of Captain McCallum, before being wrecked on 6 March 1828 at Pondicherry under McCallum.

== Lalla Rookh (1825 ship) ==
A wooden sailing vessel, 333 tons, built in 1825 by Thomas Metcalfe & Son in South Shields, "rigged as a Snow". (Note: This matches Wick wrecking.)

She sailed firstly under Captain B. R. Jones, initially between British North America, including Quebec and Miramichi, and Liverpool, and then (from 1828) in the Mediterranean.

From around 1831 Lalla Rookh sailed under Captain Green, with voyages to Mobile, Alabama, Alexandria, Virginia, New Orleans, Charleston, and Quebec.

She was wrecked near Wick, near the northern tip of mainland Scotland, on 11/12 April 1836, (Note: This website needs querying - may not match up.) while sailing from Newcastle to Quebec.

== Lalla Rookh (1826 ship) ==
A "new coppered and copper-fastened brig" of 284 tons burthen, advertised for freight or passengers for a voyage from Greenock to New Orleans by or on 1 June 1826. On 24 October 1826 she returned from New Orleans under Captain Kennedy.

== Lalla Rookh (1835 ship) ==
A whaling ship, built Dartmouth, Massachusetts, 1835, active from New Bedford until at least 1853. Two masters were James Bassett and Owen Raymond. The ship was reported whaling in the New Zealand area from 1837 to 1848.

== Lalla Rookh (1839 ship) ==
A barque, 372 tons, built in St Helier, Jersey, used to transport emigrants to the colony of South Australia, first sailing April 1840. Captains were Henry Kenney, then W. H. P. Haines. Sailed to San Francisco in May 1853. Last mentioned in Lloyd's Register in 1854.

== Lalla Rookh (1848 ship) ==
A brig/clipper variously recorded as 184 tons and 147 tons, built in Peterhead, Scotland, Lalla Rookh was one of the "new Aberdeen clippers". She carried passengers, was used for trading among the Australian colonies, and later traded in the East Indies, Mauritius and Fiji. In the 1860s, voyages were recorded to the South Sea Islands and New Caledonia.

She was broken up in 1898 at Kerosene Bay in Sydney Harbour.

== Lalla Rookh (smack), 1849/1852 ==
A smack, Lalla Rookh, assisted the US ship Trident after she ran aground on the Cork Sand, in the North Sea off the coast of Essex. She was on a voyage from Amsterdam, North Holland, Netherlands to New York. (Note: See also List of shipwrecks in September 1849.)

In November 1852 she towed the schooner Alcyon in to Harwich, Essex, after she was discovered abandoned in the English Channel off Dungeness, Kent, England. (Note: See also List of shipwrecks in November 1852.)

== Lalla Rookh (1856 ship) ==
An iron hulled square-rigged tea clipper, built in 1856 in Liverpool, Lancashire, 869 tons. Owned by Prowse & Co. She sailed under the command of captains " Connibe'r" (Colliver?), Brown, Wilson, and Fullerton. Wrecked December 1873 at Prawle Point, Devon, returning to Britain fully laden with tea and tobacco. Her figurehead is preserved in the Cutty Sark museum in Greenwich, London.

- On 28 October 1859, the Danish schooner Ida collided with a ship named Lallah Rookh and sank at Liverpool. The sunken ship's crew were rescued and she was later refloated. (It has not been confirmed that this was the 1856 ship that was involved.)

== Lalla Rookh (1859 ship) ==
A Canadian schooner, built 1859 in Oromocto, New Brunswick, 93 tons gross. Captains Crane, Freeman, Evans, Stinson and Smith, noted in directories until 1876.

== Lalla Rookh (1864 ship) ==
Lalla Rookh, a barque of 487 tons, is registered in the 1874 edition of the American Lloyd’s Register of American and Foreign Shipping as having been built in 1864 in St John, Colony of New Brunswick, owned by Robert Blair, and under Captain Dakin.

The barque is mentioned in ships' directories from 1865 to 1900 under various captains, including John Sutherland (1873), and a three-masted sailing ship is depicted in an 1871 oil painting entitled "The Lalla Rookh of St. John N.B., Capt. John Sutherland Commander", by Joseph Semphill. Other captains mentioned in the ships' directories include A. Jackson, B. H. Hender, B. Melburn, G. N. Dakin, Feye, Henderson, and T. N. Hugo.

On 6 December 1875, Lalla Rookh ran into the Norwegian brig Falger, which sank in the English Channel 20 nautical miles (37 km) off Portland, Dorset, England, UK, with the loss of a crew member and survivors rescued by Lalla Rookh. Falger was on a voyage from Dublin (then part of the United Kingdom of Great Britain and Ireland) to Fredrikstad in Norway.

== Lalla Rookh (1868 ship) ==
Was built as a paddle-steamer with two engines, each 14hp, at Mechanics Bay, Auckland, New Zealand. She was launched on 5 August 1868 by Robert Stone (builder of PS Governor Wynyard, ss Black Diamond, Lulu, schooner, Active and Quickstep, cutters). Her 2 ft 9 in (0.84 m) draught allowed her to berth at Shortland. She was wooden, 80 ft (24 m) x 13 ft (4.0 m) x 5 ft 4 in (1.63 m) and about 75 tons. On trial she reached 8.3 kn (15.4 km/h; 9.6 mph). In June 1876 R H Yeomans converted her from a paddle to a screw boat. Her old engine was fitted in a new paddle steamer and she was fitted with a Hawkeswood & Co. (Staffordshire Ironworks) single direct acting high-pressure engine of about 40 hp (30 kW), with a 12.5 in (320 mm) cylinder, of 12 in (300 mm) stroke and a 62 psi (430 kPa) 5 ft 4 in (1.63 m) x 8 ft 7 in (2.62 m) boiler. The hold was 36 ft (11 m).x 13 ft (4.0 m) x 7 ft (2.1 m), able to take about 50 tons. Reported broken up June 1876, but re-registered on 14 September 1876, with different tonnage, said to be built at North Shore, Auckland, in July 1876 by different shipbuilders, and with a single engine of 15 hp. At some point she was converted into a schooner, and was wrecked in Schooner Bay, Great Barrier Island, on 8 May 1887, after encountering bad weather in the Bay of Plenty. She was at that time owned by Fleming, Berry, Daniels and Company, of Gisborne. The ship was also known as Hettie at some point. She leaked and was beached on 8 May 1887 at Schooner Bay, Great Barrier, where she broke up. The official wreck return showed she was a 44-ton, 11 year old schooner, with the crew of 6, who all survived. Her engine and boiler were salvaged.

== Lalla Rookh (1870 ship) ==
A 126-ton schooner or yacht, bought by William Thomson, 1st Baron Kelvin in September 1870, a few months after his wife had died. He used the boat as a base for entertaining friends and scientific colleagues. Dates estimated c.1860–1900.

== Lalla Rookh (1873 ship) ==
Built in Liverpool, was the first ship to transport Indian indentured workers from British India to the Dutch colony of Suriname. The Lalla Rookh Museum covers that event and the broader history of the Indian diaspora in Suriname. She left Calcutta on 26 February 1873 with 410 immigrants on board, arriving in Paramaribo over three months later, on 5 June 1873. Owned by an Irishman at that time, the ship was afterwards either renamed or sold.

== Lalla Rookh (1875 ship) ==
A wooden two-masted ketch, 59 tons, built on the Mid North Coast region of New South Wales in 1875. Named after Lalla Rookh (1823 ship), Reportedly used for blackbirding, she was later used for carrying timber, mostly between Townsville and Maryborough. Although some newspaper reports after Cyclone Sigma in the Townsville area in January 1896 reported her missing and thought lost in the storm, later reports revealed that she had escaped intact. She was last seen on 22 December 1899 off L Island (now Scawfell Island), shortly before a tropical cyclone struck the area.

== Lalla Rookh (1876 ship) ==
An iron three-masted barque, 841 tons, built in 1876 by R & J Evans and Co. in Liverpool. In 1905 she was reported overdue when she took 199 days from Brisbane to Falmouth. Name changed to Effendi in Norway, 1916; then, in Finland, Karhu (1923). Captains included Kinnear, Crawley, Eriksson and Karlsson. In February 1926 she reverted to her original name, and was broken up in late 1928 in Bruges, Belgium.

== Lalla Rookh (1881 ship) ==
A schooner on Lake Michigan, 60.34 ton, built in Manitowoc, Wisconsin, by James Butler 2 February 1881, launched on 4 August 1881. Ran aground near Port Washington on 6 October 1887 and was stripped and abandoned.

== Lalla Rookh II (1956 ship) ==
Lalla Rookh II was built in 1956 by R J Prior & Son in Burnham-on-Crouch, Essex, as a research vessel, but styled as a fishing boat. She was named after Lord Kelvin's 1870 yacht (see above). After being sold in 1970, she was renamed St Just. After a somewhat chequered history, she is now based at Clydebank in Scotland after being restored as an historic vessel, and (as of January 2021) may be privately chartered for excursions.

== 19th-century unknowns ==
=== 1820s ===
October 1826: Imports brought on Lalla Rookh under Captain J. M. Anthony, from Sierra Leone and "Isle de Loss" - 176 elephant teeth, palm oil, camwood, animal hides, etc.

July 1827 – March 1830: Lalla Rookh between Liverpool and "Vera Cruz" (Vera Cruz, Mexico?), "Campeachy" (Campeche, Mexico? – says South America), Barbados, and Havana, under Captain Fullerton. She arrived at Liverpool on 25 August 1829 under Fullarton (sic) (origin port not stated). Fullerton arrives in Dublin on Lalla Rookh on 2 March 1830 from Demerara. (Note: There is also a Captain Fullerton commanding Lalla Rookh (1856 ship) in 1872–3, but the relationship is unknown.)

=== 1830s (Atlantic) ===
On 2 May 1830 Lalla Rookh is en route to Jamaica from Liverpool, under Captain Goodlett. 14 September 1830 she arrives back at Liverpool. On 30 September 1832 she is at Stangate Creek, from Odessa, under Goodlet (sic).

On 10 September 1832 Lalla Rookh arrives in Liverpool from Miramichi.

On 11 September 1833 Lalla Rookh under Captain Watson arrives from Paraíba.

On 29 August 1835 Lalla Rookh under Captain Mackie (sic), bound for Maranham, "was on shore near the Magazines, but got off last night without apparent damage, and proceeded this afternoon". On 16 January 1836, Lalla Rookh under Captain Mackay, arrived in Liverpool, and reported having seen an abandoned and waterlogged unnamed vessel en route across the Atlantic. (Note: 42 latitude 49 longitude, i.e. in the middle of the Atlantic.)

On 28 March 1836 Lalla Rookh, under Captain Murphy, loaded up at Liverpool in preparation for sailing for Newfoundland and St Andrew's, New Brunswick (then part of British North America), and sailed on 16 April 1836 for Newfoundland and Miramichi, New Brunswick. Lalla Rookh sprang a leak in the Atlantic Ocean on 31 July 1836 and was abandoned, waterlogged. She was on a voyage from Miramichi to Waterford. All crew were saved. (Note: See also List of shipwrecks in July 1836.)

=== 1840s ===
==== Henderson ====
On 18 November 1839 Lalla Rookh under Captain Henderson on her way from Clyde, Scotland, to Marseille, was involved in a rescue of the crew of Miriam under Captain Goss, after this ship was abandoned in the Atlantic Ocean. Miriam was on a voyage from Newfoundland to Falmouth, Cornwall. Lalla Rookh transported the crew to Gibraltar. (Note: See also List of shipwrecks in November 1839.) On 4 January 1840, is reported at Marseille.

==== Burrows ====
On 3 August 1842, "the brig Lalla Rookh", under the command of Captain Burrows, arrived at Greenock from St Vincent and Barbados, having completed the journey in 34 days after leaving Barbados on 18 June. On 17 January 1843, Lalla Rookh arrived at Clyde from Demerara (then a county in British Guiana famed for its sugar) under Burrows. On 23 September 1844 she is reported as arriving at Demerara from Clyde, under Burrows. On 11 February 1845 she arrived at St Helena under Burrows. On 14 April 1845 she arrives in the Clyde under Burrows, from Ichaboe Island. (Note: Ichaboe Island was a small island off Namibia, a centre of guano mining activity in the 19th C.) On 17 May 1845 Lalla Rookh left Clyde for Demerara, under Burrows. On 6 March 1846 arrived at Savannah (Note: Assume the port in Georgia, US.) from Antigua under Burrows. and on 25 May 1846 Lalla Rookh arrives back in the Clyde from Barbados.

Burrows is reported as commander of another ship, Constantine, on 27 March 1849.

==== Others ====
Also on 14 April 1845 there is also a second Lalla Rookh, captain unknown, reported "from [the Clyde], off Blackhead for Greenock".

On 26 February 1849 Lalla Rookh sailed to Demerara from Deal, Kent.

=== 1850s ===
On 31 January 1850, Lalla Rookh anchored off Torbay, Devon, after returning from Sydney and Pernambuco, Brazil.

==== November 1850 Worthing incident ====
The Lalla Rookh (also spelt Lallah Rookh) described as a barque and East Indiaman of 700 tons ("two remaining masts" were described), foundered, but was not wrecked, in a huge storm off Worthing, West Sussex, on 25 November 1850. She was reported to have been coming from Brazil, heavily laden with rum and sugar. The boat was in distress in a storm 3 miles (4.8 km) off the coast, and 11 fishermen set out on board a small ferry, the Britannia. The Britannia capsized, and a second boat was launched, returning with the news that the Britannia was lost with all lives. The second boat put 16 (or 6) hands on the deck of Lalla Rookh to help with rigging a jury mainmast and to guide her safely to port, and she was seen "to bend a new foretopsail" at 4pm. A newspaper report on 5 December says that once the storm abated, she would be taken to Newhaven, a port in East Sussex; later accounts record that she was escorted to London by a lugger. An unconfirmed report said that several of Lallah Rookh's crew had been killed by the collapsing mainmast. Nearly 40 children were left orphaned in Worthing by the disaster, and four men in one family were killed when the rescue boat capsized.

This was one of the worst maritime disasters in Worthing's history, and, soon after the town's inhabitants subscribed for the town's first lifeboat, funding was provided for a permanent lifeboat for Worthing. The incident (as well as the accompanying storm, which caused damage to shipping elsewhere) was widely reported in the British press, and described in New South Wales' Macleay Argus as a "tragic story of the sea", and in Melbourne's Argus in March 1831 as an "awful catastrophe". The Macleay newspaper said: "During a terrible storm on Nov. 26, 1850, a dismasted bark, the Lalla Rookh, East Indiaman, homeward hound with a valuable cargo, was seen labouring heavily in the storm shewing signals of distress". The fishermen were dubbed the "Brave Eleven", and a 2004 project entitled The Lalla Rookh Project: A Poetic Archive was dedicated to them.

==== 1851–1859 ====
- On 27 January 1851 Lalla Rookh departed Pernambuco, bound for Trieste, Italy, with 2,104 bags of sugar.
- Lalla Rookh, under a British flag (possibly one of the above) was reported driven ashore and "feared" wrecked at Gibraltar on 1 December 1852. Note that the 1839 barque is recorded as leaving Sydney for San Francisco in May 1853.
- Lallah Rookh, under a British flag, was reported to have sprung a leak and beached at Swatow, China on 10 August 1856.
- On 16 October 1856, Lalla Rookh of Sydney, 156 tons, sailed from Hobart to Sydney under Captain James Reece.
- Lalla Rookh appears in an 1855 directory, 603 tons; from Bath, Maine. Captains Cotton, Fulton, Gilliot or Galliot, Preble and Read may have commanded this one.

=== 1860s ===
- A steamer named Lalla Rookh was reported "totally wrecked" in a typhoon off Shanghai, China, on or before 22 July 1865. She was sailing under the flag of British India.
- On 18 March 1867, Lalla Rookh arrived at Portsmouth from Cherbourg, under Captain Bennett. (Note: A channel ferry?)

=== 1870s ===
- On 9 July 1870 Lalla Rookh, a sloop, was driven ashore near Otterndorf, Prussia, on a voyage from Stornoway, Isle of Lewis, Outer Hebrides to Hamburg. She was refloated the next day and taken in to Hamburg. (Note: See also List of shipwrecks in July 1870.)

== 20th century unknowns ==
- Lalla Rookh, a "sailing dinghy" capsized in the Hobart Regatta off Smelting Works Bay, Hobart, Tasmania, in January 1910.
- A "cutter-rigged yacht" named Lalla Rookh, found taking on water by lifeguard boat near Portland Race on 4 April 1953, was escorted to safety at Weymouth, Dorset.
