= Maritime history of Worthing =

Resort and port in England

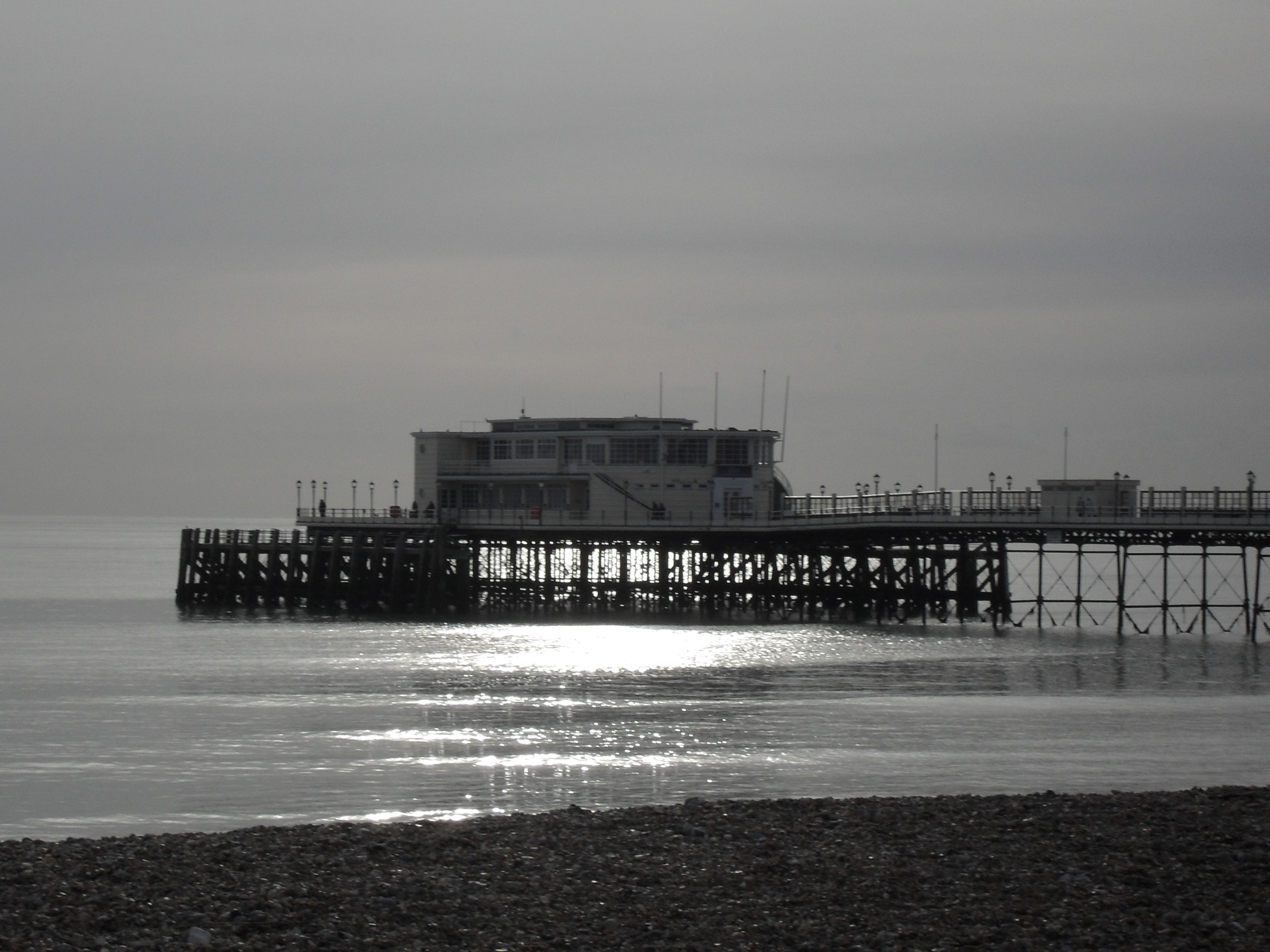
Worthing Pier in 2009

Worthing, a seaside resort on the English Channel coast of West Sussex, southeast England, has a long maritime history predating its late 18th-century emergence as a fashionable holiday and residential town. Fishing was a major economic activity for centuries, and still retains a small presence on Worthing's shingle shoreline. Smuggling, usually by sea, also contributed to the growing town's economy. The formerly sandy beach has changed over time, partly because of sea defence work carried out to alleviate concerns over flooding, which has affected the town several times. Large seaweed deposits, driven up from the sea bed, have caused occasional problems, while undersea rock formations off the coast have national importance as a wildlife habitat. There have been many shipwrecks and groundings in the area, and lifeboats were stationed in the town for many years.

== Beach and coastline ==
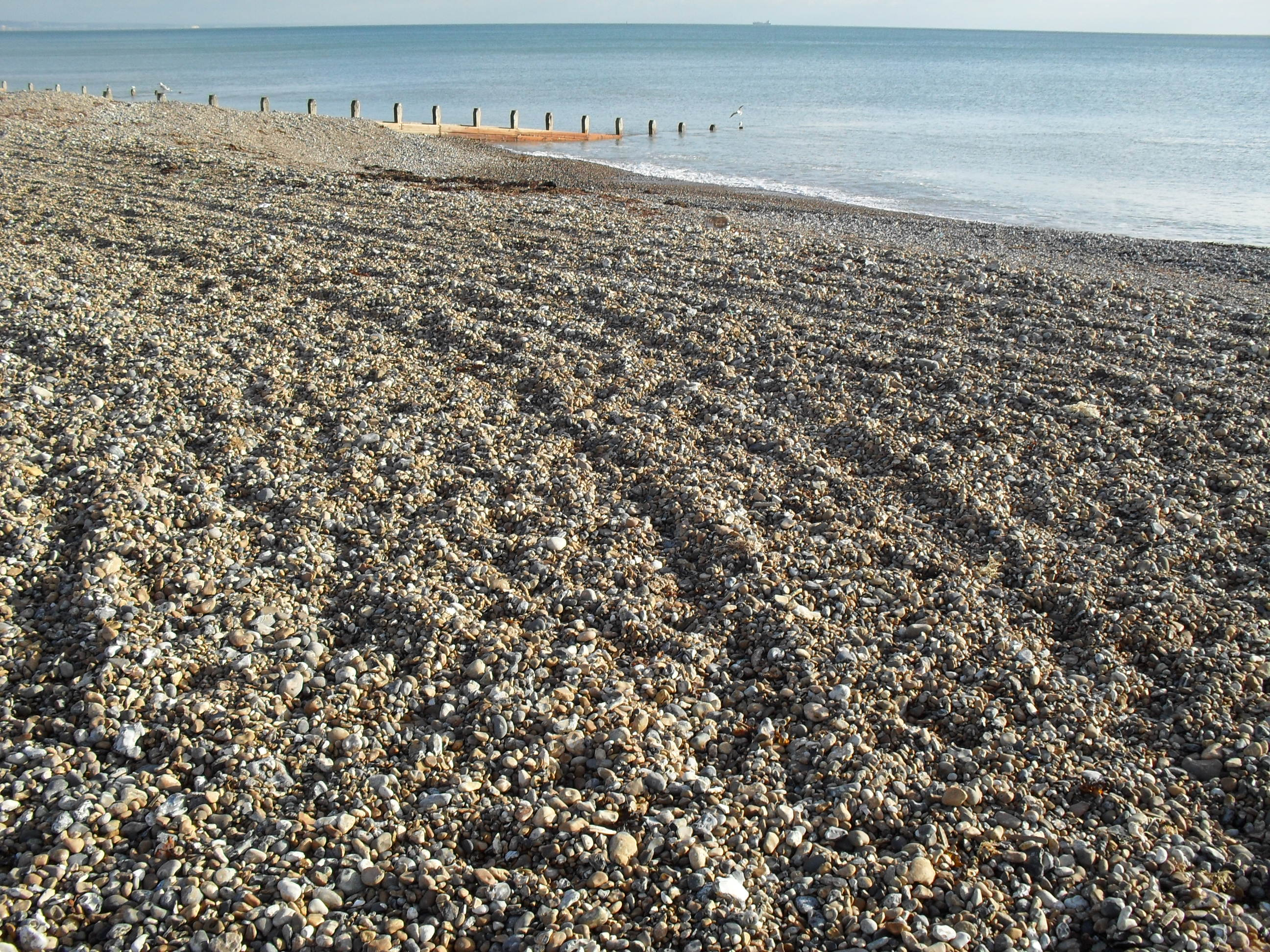
19th-century timber groynes caused coarse shingle to accumulate on Worthing's previously sandy beach.

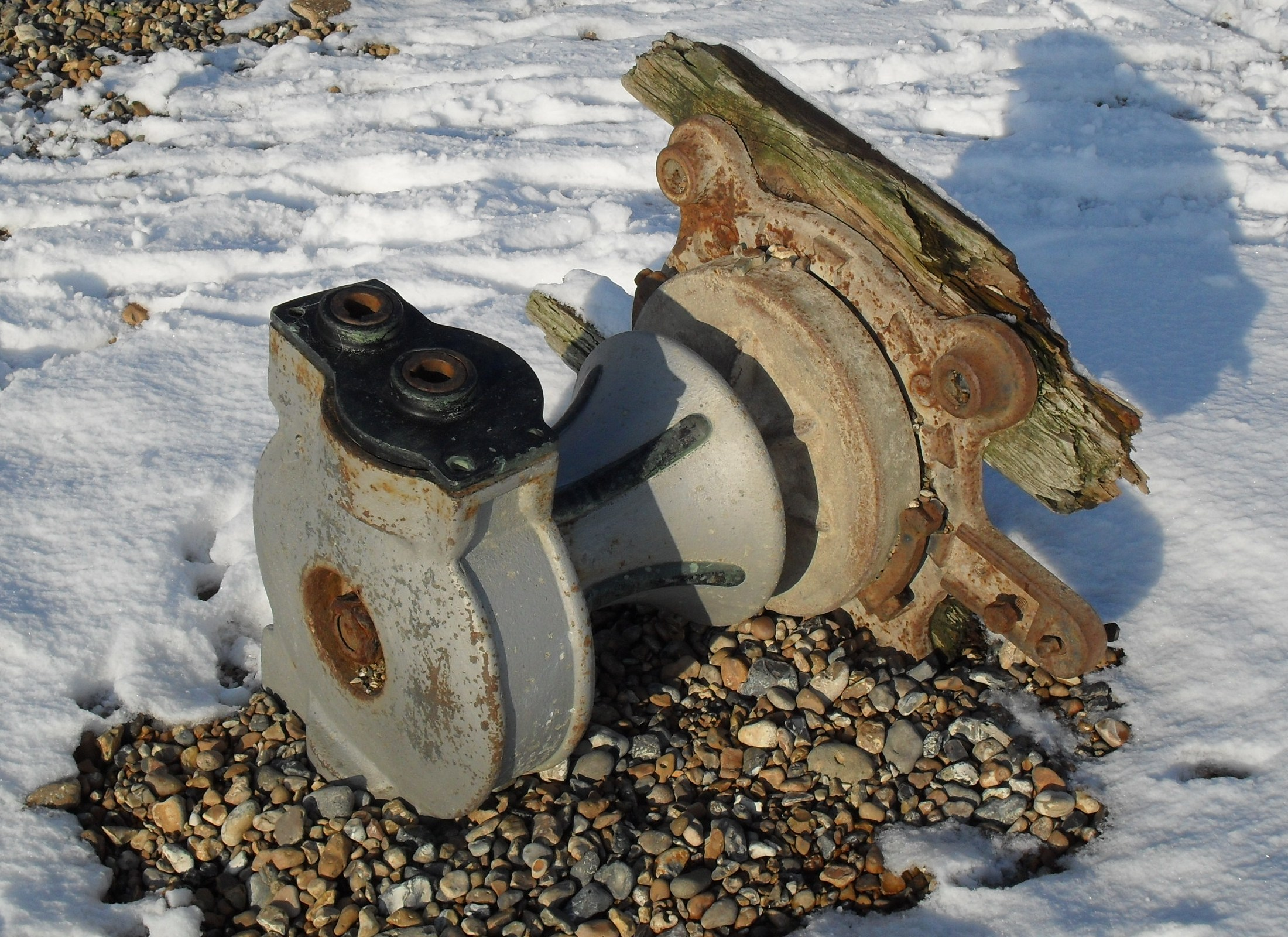
This capstan is one of three on Worthing beach; it survives from the 19th century.

Worthing is situated on a small ridge next to the English Channel coast. The geology and physical geography of the coastline encourage erosion and longshore drift, which have had major effects on the hinterland. The coastline is almost entirely built up, but there are some gaps such as Goring Gap and the grounds of Beach House.

Worthing developed in the pre-medieval era as a small southern outpost of the parish and larger village of Broadwater, based on farming and fishing. Teville Stream and its estuary, upon which a harbour was situated by the 14th century, separated the hamlet from Broadwater. The early farmers reclaimed land from the sea, but it was lost again to flooding during the Middle Ages. Soon after this, a bar of shingle began to form in the sea, affecting the current and also the tidal flow of the stream. This protected the coastline and allowed salt marshes to form. Usually called the "saltgreen", "Worthing Common" or, most often, the "saltgrass", this fertile soil contained large amounts of salt—the most important preservative agent of the pre-refrigeration era. Salt and other minerals were extracted, and the land was used for farming. Instead of being enclosed, as much land was at the time, it was left as common land; Worthing's inhabitants were granted leases to graze their animals on it. Some buildings also stood there: an early courthouse, and some buildings called "shops" which were likely to be fishing-related. The first of these was documented in the early 17th century, and several others were known about later that century.

Storms in the 17th century and in 1703 started to damage this exposed land, and it was completely undermined in the 18th century. An inn on the saltgrass was destroyed by the sea in 1772: its remains were washed on to the beach during a winter storm. The 50 acres (20 ha) of saltgrass remaining in the middle of the 18th century had disappeared by the early 19th century, and a beach of fine golden sand appeared in its place. The shingle bar, which wind and wave action had gradually moved towards the shore, had also contributed to these changes, and its undesirable effect on the flow of water around the estuary resulted in the town commissioners breaking it up at the start of the 19th century. At the same time, groynes were constructed to attempt to save the land on which the growing town was built from erosion. This was only partly successful—floods affected the town centre several times during the 19th century, particularly on New Year's Day 1877 when water reached a long way inland—and accumulations of stones and shingle started to affect the quality of the beach. Storms in 1866 forced the esplanade (originally built in 1819) to be repaired. By the 20th century, the beach was composed entirely of large, coarse stones called Coombe Rock. The esplanade was extended to the east and west during the 1930s, and sea defences were improved further from 1990 onwards when blocks of stone were built into the beach at three points. Long-term trends suggest that shingle will continue to accumulate on the beach and make it shelve more steeply, and the land will continue to erode (especially if sea levels rise) and be carried off to the east on sea currents.

There are three capstans on Worthing beach. All survive from the 19th century, when they were used by boat crews.

== Worthing Lumps and seaweed ==
The Worthing Lumps are a range of underwater chalk cliffs about 5 miles (8 km) off the Worthing coast. They face north, rise as high as 10 feet (3 m) and have areas of small rocks and sand at their base. They have been designated a Marine Site of Nature Conservation Interest (SNCI), and are an important breeding and visiting ground for sea creatures such as lesser spotted dogfish, tompot blenny, gobies, triggerfish and piddocks, and for birds such as the red-breasted merganser. There are few undersea chalk cliffs in the waters around Britain: Sussex has several, and the Lumps have been described as the best example.

A large "seaweed zone" also exists on the seabed off Worthing. Seaweed has been washed up on Worthing beach throughout the town's history, but it began to cause problems at the start of the 19th century when the town was growing and trying to present itself as a fashionable seaside resort. The decaying matter was unsightly, smelt offensive and attracted flies, especially when sewage from the town's primitive drainage system mixed with it. When Worthing was an agricultural and fishing village, farmers took the seaweed away and used it as fertiliser; the town commissioners allowed this at first, but later discouraged it. By the mid-20th century, the Borough Council demanded payment from people wishing to remove seaweed from the beach; when it piled up, it was mechanically pushed out to sea, but this damaged the beach. Confirmation that the source was local came in 1956, when a specialist team analysed the West Sussex seabed; this disproved a longstanding theory that rocks on the seabed at Bognor Regis were to blame.

== Fishing and boatbuilding industry ==
Fishing was important to Worthing's economy from the 16th century or earlier, when it was a modest village, until the early 20th century, but the numbers of boats and men employed were small. Early fishermen supplemented their income by working the land for part of the year as well, and some inhabitants who farmed for most of the year also fished occasionally. Fishing tended to run in families for many generations. As well as being sold locally, fish was being exported to towns in Sussex and Surrey by the late 18th century. The main catches were mackerel and herring, supplemented by various crustaceans. A large oyster bed was found in 1823, and it yielded 50 million oysters within the first year; but overfishing led to its exhaustion within a decade.

In the 1830s, Worthing's fishermen were affected by economic decline, overfishing and competition from unlicensed French fishermen (English laws required fishermen to hold licences). French boats would sail into English territory, sabotage nets and take as many fish as they could. Worthing's fishermen united in 1838 to present a petition to the House of Commons of the United Kingdom demanding action, and the intervention of Sir George Richard Brooke-Pechell, 4th Baronet (MP for Brighton and the owner of Castle Goring) resulted in the French and British governments signing a trade agreement which improved fishing rights for the English.

The industry was most successful in the second half of the 19th century. The local fishing fleet trebled in size to 110 boats between 1855 and 1887, and the 1892 season's yield was valued at a record £2,526. Decline in yield, boats used and men employed set in quickly after that: about ten fishermen were still active in 1950 and five by the 1990s.

Boatbuilding was less important in Worthing than in nearby towns such as Shoreham-by-Sea and Littlehampton, but a small industry existed for about 60 years from the mid-19th century: a fishing boat built in 1856 was the town's first, and boats were sold outside the town. J. Belton's building firm, active from the 1880s until 1916, was the most prominent company in the area.

== Smuggling ==
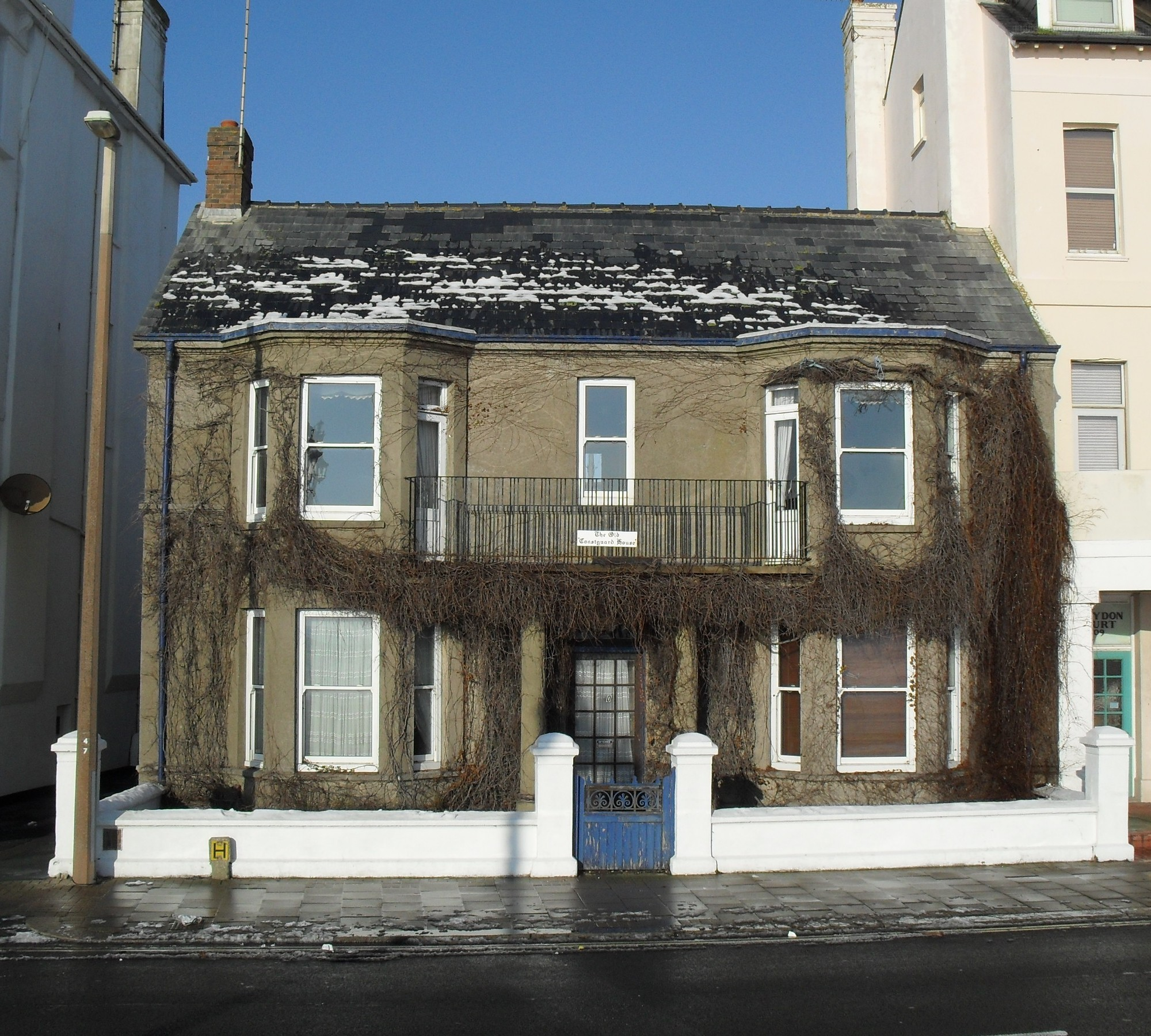
The former Coastguard House dates from the 1820s.

When Worthing first developed as a fashionable resort, it was often reported in newspapers, guidebooks and other media that the town's new-found high-class status was in contrast to its corrupt history as a "den of smugglers". This was an exaggeration, but there was significant smuggling activity during the 1740s: battles between soldiers and smugglers culminated in the defeat of a major gang in 1749, which subdued illegal operations for several decades.

Activity resumed in the 1820s because of economic depression which had caused Worthing's economy to stagnate. High taxes on goods were also a factor. A customs ship stationed off Worthing as part of the Coastal Blockade for the Prevention of Smuggling—a response to the events of the Napoleonic Wars, which attempted to defend the Kent and Sussex coasts—seized many shipments of contraband goods during the 1820s, and there were several battles in which smugglers and troops suffered injuries. In February 1832, 200 smugglers broke through the defences and reached the High Street with their contraband; they were intercepted, and during the subsequent fighting the gang leader was shot dead as he tried to defend the gang while they crossed Teville Stream. After this, dragoons were stationed in Worthing specifically to prevent smuggling. The gang leader, William Cowerson, was well respected in the town; his funeral was attended by many people, and his grave in Steyning church yard is marked by an ornate headstone. He is said to have stored contraband in various hiding places, including tombs at St Andrew's Church, West Tarring.

Another incident in 1838, when smugglers were caught running contraband through the grounds of Beach House, resulted in another major battle. Thereafter, smuggling became less attractive because taxes on imported goods were reduced and free trade became easier. The last reported incidents were in the 1870s.

== Coastguards, lifeboats and shipwrecks ==
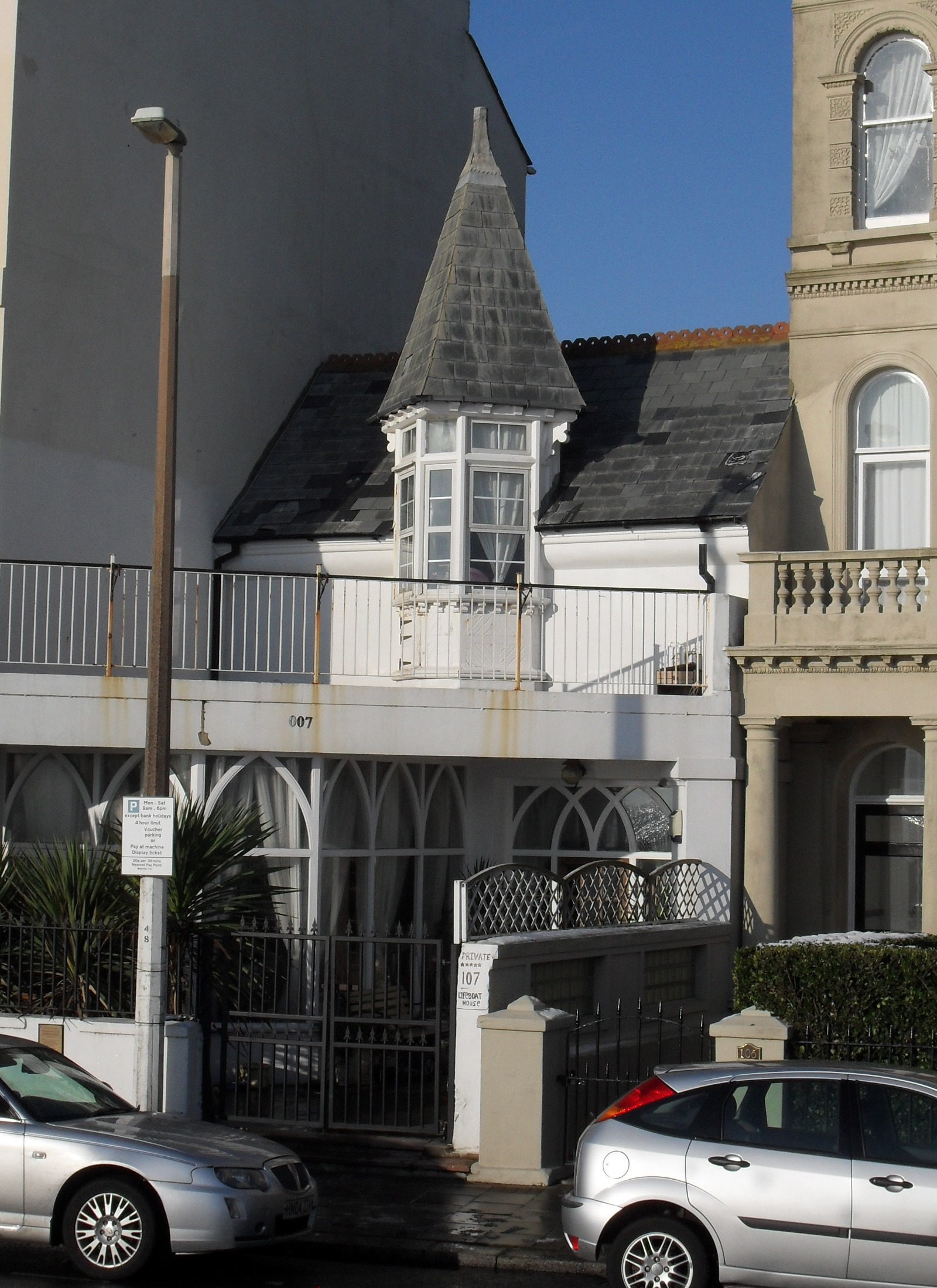
The former lifeboat station retains its conical lookout tower.

Worthing's first coastguard house, a wooden structure on the seafront, was built in about 1809, and a sea mark had helped navigation since its installation in 1795. Another coastguard station was built in the 1820s; a passageway next to it marks the ancient boundary between Worthing and Heene. Short-lived stations were recorded in East Worthing during the mid-19th century. Others existed between 1886 and 1934 (in central Worthing) and between 1886 and 1903 (at Goring-by-Sea). The 1820s station closed in 1931, but the building survives.

The coastguards regularly battled with smugglers during the 1820s and 1830s, and killed the town's smuggling ringleader in 1832. They also kept order among Worthing's fishermen during a period of discord with their French rivals during the 1830s. In 1836, three coastguard crew died in an accident at sea off Goring-by-Sea.

After 11 fishermen died when attempting to rescue the crew of the foundering Lalla Rookh (which was afterwards escorted safely to London)) in 1850, funding was provided for a permanent lifeboat for Worthing. A Littlehampton-based firm provided the first boat in 1852 or 1853, and it stood outside the coastguard house. A lifeboat station was provided later: it opened at 107 Marine Parade, near the coastguard house, in 1874 and survives, much altered (although its original lookout turret remains) and in private residential ownership. In March 1865, the Royal National Lifeboat Institution took control of lifeboat operations in Worthing, and a new boat was provided. It served (under two names) until 1887, when another replacement was built; this was in turn replaced in 1901. Another boat was also used later.

A lifeboat station was opened at Shoreham-by-Sea in 1929, and it served Worthing from the following year, at which point the town's station was shut down. The last boat was put on display in the town until 1950. Research suggests that 58 people were saved by the Worthing lifeboat during its years of operation. Since the late 20th century, Worthing Borough Council have owned and operated some modern inflatable craft on Worthing seafront.

Difficult currents and sudden changes in the level of the seabed, with many shallow areas, have made the Worthing coast—in common with other parts of Sussex—an area where shipwrecks and similar incidents are common. Wrecks and groundings have been documented since the 17th century, and two caused multiple deaths; the Lalla Rookh disaster killed 11 local men and led to the provision of lifeboats in the town. The sinking of the Indiana resulted in large numbers of oranges and lemons washing ashore, which attracted thousands of residents eager to retrieve them despite coastguards trying to stop them.

=== List of shipwrecks and groundings ===
Vessel	Registry	Year	Deaths	Notes	Ref.
St James	Spain	1644	0	This warship became grounded on the shore at Heene, although it was successfully refloated.	
Teignmouth		1834	0	This sailing ship was wrecked and driven ashore on the beach.	
Lalla Rookh	United Kingdom	1850	11	When this barque was seen in distress in stormy waters 3.5 miles (5.6 km) off Worthing during a November storm, eleven local fishermen sailed out to help. As hundreds of people watched from the shore, the fishing boat suddenly capsized just before it reached the Lalla Rookh. All 11 crew were lost, and another team of fishermen rescued the barque's crew.	
Eliza		1860	0	This lugger came ashore at East Worthing and was wrecked.	
Elima		1860	0	Another lugger was wrecked just five days after the Eliza, this time on Worthing beach.	
Ebeneza		1877	0	This sailing ship sank when it was anchored off East Worthing.	
Theresa	United Kingdom	1883	0	Four crewmembers had to be rescued by the Worthing lifeboat when this schooner ran aground at East Worthing.	
Lovely Druina		1887	0	This was a ketch which sank off the coast.	
Albert H. Locke	United Kingdom	1888	0	This coal-carrying brig was wrecked near Worthing Pier.	
Capella	Germany	1891	0	The crew of this barque had to be rescued when it ran aground, but it was able to continue its journey.	
King Carl XV	Norway	1891	0	This schooner was wrecked on the shore in the centre of Worthing after running aground. The same storm was responsible for this wreck and the Capella incident.	
Zadne	United Kingdom	1894	11	This 490-ton steamship was carrying coal to London when the crew of 11 were forced to abandon ship off the coast of Worthing. Their lifeboat sank and all on board died. The bodies were recovered and were buried at St Mary's Church, Broadwater. Worthing's lifeboat was not launched, but after an inquiry no blame was attached to the crew or coastguard.	
Halcyon		1895	0	This brig came ashore on Worthing beach and was wrecked. Worthing's lifeboat was launched to rescue the crew.	
Ophir	Norway	1896	0	This Norwegian barque was wrecked on the Lancing/Worthing boundary, and some of the crew were picked up by the Worthing lifeboat.	
Indiana	United Kingdom	1901	0	This 2,225-ton steamer crashed into another ship, the City of Washington, at East Worthing. It was wrecked, and sank; the City of Washington rescued the crew. The Indiana was carrying a large cargo of fruit, which was washed ashore for several days afterwards.	
Aniraci	Italy	1912	0	The rescue of this ship, which encountered difficulties off Worthing and was wrecked, was commemorated in a painting which is held at Worthing Museum and Art Gallery.	
Kingshill		1915	1	This schooner sent out a distress signal in stormy seas, and was eventually wrecked at Goring-by-Sea. Worthing lifeboat was launched, but it capsized during the rescue, killing a crewmember.	
Eden		1917	0	This steamer was a wartime casualty: it was sunk by a torpedo near Worthing Pier.	
Varuna		1970	0	This barge ran aground on the beach at West Worthing.	

=== Commemorations ===
The Lalla Rookh has been described as Worthing's greatest tragedy, and continues to be commemorated: for example, in 2004 a collection of poetry inspired by the events and the poem which gave the ship its name was exhibited at Worthing library. Most of the men who died were married fathers, and they were performing the role of rescuers voluntarily in the absence of a town lifeboat service. Residents and civic leaders raised more than £5,000 for the families of the men killed, and there is a memorial at St Mary's Church in Broadwater.

Worthing Borough Council has also commemorated other shipwrecks. A road in East Worthing was named Ophir Road in reference to the wreck of the Ophir nearby. In 1989, the naming of a new block of flats on the seafront in West Worthing was intended to honour the Capella, which came ashore there nearly a century earlier—but the name was accidentally misspelt and the building became "Capelia House".

Since 2005, the sinking of the Indiana has been commemorated by an annual charity event. Residents gather on the beach to throw oranges and lemons, in reference to the washed-up cargo, and prizes are given for the longest throws.
