= List of shipwrecks in November 1839 =

The list of shipwrecks in November 1839 includes ships sunk, foundered, wrecked, grounded, or otherwise lost during November 1839.

== 1 November ==
List of shipwrecks: 1 November 1839
Ship	State	Description
Bedale	United Kingdom	The ship struck rocks at Hartlepool, County Durham. She was on a voyage from Hamburg to Hull, Yorkshire. Bedale was refloated and taken into Hartlepool.
Catharina	United Kingdom	The ship was driven ashore and wrecked at Hogsthorpe, Lincolnshire with the loss of two of her crew.
Good Hope	United Kingdom	The ship sprang a leak and foundered in the Bristol Channel off Morte Point, Devon. Her crew were rescued. She was on a voyage from Llanelly, Glamorgan to Bideford, Devon.
Harlequin	United Kingdom	The ship collided with Harlequin (United Kingdom) and foundered. Her crew were rescued. She was on a voyage from Liverpool, Lancashire to Glasgow, Renfrewshire.

== 2 November ==
List of shipwrecks: 2 November 1839
Ship	State	Description
Elisabeth Jacoba	Prussia	The ship was driven ashore and wrecked at Cley-next-the-Sea, Norfolk, United Kingdom. She was on a voyage from Memel to Harlingen, Friesland, Netherlands.
Frau Christina	Hamburg	The ship sprang a leak and was beached on Heligoland. she was on a voyage from Altona to Glasgow, Renfrewshire, United Kingdom.
Palme	United Kingdom	The ship was wrecked on Pico Island, Azores with the loss of a crew member. She was on a voyage from Rio de Janeiro, Brazil to Cowes, Isle of Wight.
Seine	United Kingdom	The ship was driven ashore at Whitby, Yorkshire. Her crew were rescued by the Whitby Lifeboat. Seine was on a voyage from Newcastle upon Tyne, Northumberland to Hamburg. She was refloated on 7 November.

== 3 November ==
List of shipwrecks: 3 November 1839
Ship	State	Description
Margaret Scott	United Kingdom	The ship ran aground on the Hoyle Bank, in Liverpool Bay. She was on a voyage from Saint Petersburg, Russia to Liverpool, Lancashire. She was refloated and towed into Liverpool by the steam tug President (United Kingdom).

== 4 November ==
List of shipwrecks: 4 November 1839
Ship	State	Description
Azores Packet	United Kingdom	The ship ran aground on the Foreness Rock, off Margate, Kent. She was on a voyage from Dénia, Spain to London. Azores Packet was refloated and resumed her voyage.
Beresford	United Kingdom	The ship was wrecked at Shoeburyness, Essex. She was on a voyage from Poole, Dorset to London.
Despatch	United Kingdom	The sloop was driven against the quayside and sank at Leith, Lothian.
Earl of Devon	United Kingdom	The ship was driven ashore at Ramsgate, Kent. She was on a voyage from Ramsgate to Newcastle upon Tyne, Northumberland. Earl of Devon was refloated and resumed her voyage.
Elizabeth	United Kingdom	The brig was in collision with James Moorhouse (United Kingdom) and sank off Cromer, Norfolk. Her crew survived.
Jane	United Kingdom	The sloop was driven against the Quayside and sank at Leith.

== 5 November ==
List of shipwrecks: 5 November 1839
Ship	State	Description
Ann	United Kingdom	The ship was in collision with Paulina (Prussia) in the Nieuw Diep and was severely damaged. She was on a voyage from Newcastle upon Tyne, Northumberland to Amsterdam, North Holland, Netherlands. Ann was taken into Amsterdam in a sinking condition.
Concordia	Netherlands	The ship sprang a leak and capsized in the Vlie. Her crew were rescued. She was on a voyage from Königsberg, Prussia to Amsterdam.

== 6 November ==
List of shipwrecks: 6 November 1839
Ship	State	Description
Caçador	Portugal	The brig was wrecked on Hainan Island, China. She was on a voyage from China to Manila, Spanish East Indies.
Elisabetha	Sweden	The ship was driven ashore and severely damaged at Mandal, Norway. She was on a voyage from Hull, Yorkshire, United Kingdom to Stockholm. Elisabetha was later refloated and put into "Kiove".
Victoria	United Kingdom	The paddle steamer, which had sprung a leak the day before, was beached at Harwich, Essex. All on board were rescued. She was on a voyage from Hull to London.

== 7 November ==
List of shipwrecks: 7 November 1839
Ship	State	Description
Elizabeth	(United Kingdom of Great Britain and Ireland) New South Wales	The schooner was wrecked at Batemans Bay. Her three crew were rescued. She was on a voyage from Sydney to Port Phillip.
Tiber	United Kingdom	The collier was run into and sunk in the North Sea 2 nautical miles (3.7 km) off Huntcliff, Yorkshire by John Dunn (United Kingdom). Her crew survived. She was on a voyage from London to South Shields, County Durham.
Wansbeck	United Kingdom	The ship was wrecked on the coast of British Honduras between the mouths of the Chinelici and Ulloa rivers.

== 8 November ==
List of shipwrecks: 8 November 1839
Ship	State	Description
Isabella	United Kingdom	The ship was driven ashore at Weymouth, Dorset. She was on a voyage from Cádiz, Spain to London. Isabella was refloated and taken into Weymouth.
Romulus	United Kingdom	The brig was wrecked on a reef off Nassau, Bahamas. She was on a voyage from the Laguna de Términos to Liverpool, Lancashire. Romulus was refloated with assistance from HMS Lark (Royal Navy) and taken into Nassau for repairs.

== 9 November ==
List of shipwrecks: 9 November 1839
Ship	State	Description
Avalon	United Kingdom	The ship was driven ashore at Cádiz, Spain. She was on a voyage from Naples, Kingdom of the Two Sicilies to Cádiz. Avalon was refloated on 16 November and towed into the Isla del Trocadero.
Carmen	Spanish Navy	The bombard was driven ashore near Cádiz.
Star	United Kingdom	The ship foundered in the Atlantic Ocean 20 nautical miles (37 km) west of Sanlúcar de Barrameda, Spain. Her crew were rescued. She was on a voyage from London to Seville, Spain.

== 10 November ==
List of shipwrecks: 10 November 1839
Ship	State	Description
Dryad	United Kingdom	The ship was wrecked on a reef 15 nautical miles (28 km) east of Cape Cruz, Cuba. Her crew were rescued. She was on a voyage from Liverpool, Lancashire to St. Jago de Cuba, Cuba.
Eliza	United Kingdom	The ship was driven ashore at Miscouche, Prince Edward Island, British North America. She was on a voyage from Bedeque, Prince Edward Island to London.
Isabella	Portugal	The ship ran aground, capsized and sank in the Elbe. she was on a voyage from Hamburg to Lisbon.
Joseph	United Kingdom	The ship struck the Indian Rocks off Prince Edward Island. She was on a voyage from Bedeque to London. Joseph was consequently condemned.

== 11 November ==
List of shipwrecks: 11 November 1839
Ship	State	Description
Don Juan	United Kingdom	The schooner ran aground on the West Barrow Sand, in the North Sea off the coast of Essex. She was on a voyage from Hamburg to Newfoundland. Don Juan was later refloated with assistance from the smacks Elizabeth and George and Eliza (both United Kingdom).
Emanuel	United Kingdom	The ship was driven ashore on "Stettingen Island", Denmark. Her crew were rescued. She was on a voyage from London to Frederikshavn, Denmark.
Sunda	United Kingdom	The Chinaman was driven ashore and wrecked on "Loya Island" with the loss of five lives.

== 12 November ==
List of shipwrecks: 12 November 1839
Ship	State	Description
Darling	United Kingdom	The ship was abandoned off Tralee, County Cork. She was on a voyage from Tralee to Westport, County Mayo.
Jeune Pauline	France	The ship was wrecked on Rodrigues with the loss of a crew member. She was on a voyage from Nantes, Loire-Inférieure to Mauritius.

== 13 November ==
List of shipwrecks: 13 November 1839
Ship	State	Description
Georgiana	United Kingdom	The ship ran aground in the Mississippi River. She was on a voyage from Liverpool, Lancashire to New Orleans, Louisiana.
Minerva	Greifswald	The ship was driven ashore at Frederikshavn, Denmark. She was on a voyage from London, United Kingdom to Greifswald. Minerva was refloated on 17 November.

== 14 November ==
List of shipwrecks: 14 November 1839
Ship	State	Description
Charlotte	United Kingdom	The ship was driven ashore at Frederikshavn, Denmark, where she subsequently became a wreck. Her crew were rescued. She was on a voyage from London to Danzig.
Rosalie	United Kingdom	The ship was abandoned in the River Mersey. Her crew were rescued by a Royal Navy ship. She was on a voyage from Liverpool, Lancashire to Ostend, West Flanders, Belgium.

== 15 November ==
List of shipwrecks: 15 November 1839
Ship	State	Description
Bure	United Kingdom	The ship was driven ashore on Eierland, North Holland, Netherlands. She was on a voyage from Liverpool, Lancashire to Amsterdam, North Holland. Bure was later refloated and put into Terschelling, Friesland, Netherlands.
Chilton	United Kingdom	The ship sprang a leak and became waterlogged in the Atlantic Ocean with the loss of five of her thirteen crew. Survivors were rescued on 30 November by City of York (United Kingdom).
Sovereign	United Kingdom	The steamship was severely damaged by fire at Grimsby, Lincolnshire.

== 17 November ==
List of shipwrecks: 17 November 1839
Ship	State	Description
Circassian	United Kingdom	The brig ran aground on the Cross Sand, in the North Sea off the coast of Norfolk and was abandoned by all bar her captain. She was on a voyage from Sunderland, County Durham to Constantinople, Ottoman Empire. Circassian was refloated the next day and take into Great Yarmouth, Norfolk.
Jupiter	United Kingdom	The ship was driven ashore at Dragør, Denmark. She was on a voyage from Saint Petersburg, Russia to Liverpool, Lancashire. Jupiter was later refloated and put into Helsingør, Denmark for repairs.
Mathilda	Bremen	The ship ran aground in the Swine Bottoms, off the coast of Denmark. She was on a voyage from Bremen to Stettin. Mathilda was refloated and resumed her voyage.
Perseverance	France	The ship struck a sunken rock and sank at Dunkirk, Nord. She was on a voyage from Martinique to Dunkirk. Perseverance was refloated on 19 November and taken into Dunkirk.

== 18 November ==
List of shipwrecks: 18 November 1839
Ship	State	Description
Britannia	United Kingdom	The ship was driven ashore near Flamborough Head, Yorkshire. She was on a voyage from London to South Shields, County Durham. Britannia was later refloated and resumed her voyage.
Miriam	United Kingdom	The ship was abandoned in the Atlantic Ocean. Her crew were rescued by Lalla Rookh (United Kingdom). Miriam was on a voyage from Newfoundland, British North America to Falmouth, Cornwall.

== 19 November ==
List of shipwrecks: 19 November 1839
Ship	State	Description
Cordelia	United Kingdom	The ship ran aground off Dragør, Denmark. She was on a voyage from Saint Petersburg, Russia to the Clyde. Cordelia was refloated and resumed her voyage.
Petworth	United Kingdom	The ship was driven ashore at Cork Point, Kent. She was on a voyage from South Shields, County Durham to Rouen, Seine-Inférieure, France. Petworth was refloated and taken into Folkestone, Kent.

== 20 November ==
List of shipwrecks: 20 November 1839
Ship	State	Description
Fanny	United Kingdom	The ship was in collision with another vessel. She was beached on Bardsey Island, Pembrokeshire. Fanny was on a voyage from Liverpool, Lancashire to Antwerp, Belgium.
Harmony	United Kingdom	The schooner was wrecked on the "Isle of Glass". She was on a voyage from Wick, Caithness to and Irish port.

== 21 November ==
List of shipwrecks: 21 November 1839
Ship	State	Description
Fairfield	United Kingdom	The ship was wrecked in Chaleur Bay. Her crew were rescued. She was on a voyage from the Saguenay River to London.
Favouri	French Navy	The hired brig was driven ashore and wrecked at Fort-de-France, Philippeville, Algeria. All on board survived.

== 22 November ==
List of shipwrecks: 22 November 1839
Ship	State	Description
Bien Aimé	France	The ship was driven ashore and wrecked at "Alcantara", Algeria. All on board were rescued.
Espérance	France	The ship was driven ashore and wrecked at Cap-de-Fer, Algeria. Her crew survived.
Freundschaft	Prussia	The ship sank off Lyngby, Denmark. She was on a voyage from Hull, Yorkshire to Memel.
Gelendzhik (Геленджик)	Imperial Russian Navy	The lugger sprang a severe leak and was beached at Novorossiysk. Her crew were rescued.
Hibernia	United Kingdom	The ship was driven ashore on the Traverse. She was on a voyage from Sines, Portugal to London. She was later refloated but drove ashore on the Pilgrims and was wrecked.
Minerva	United Kingdom	The ship was driven ashore on St Michael's Isle, Isle of Man. She was on a voyage from Whitehaven, Cumberland to Dublin. Minerva had become a wreck by 10 December.

== 23 November ==
List of shipwrecks: 23 November 1839
Ship	State	Description
Bee, or Belle	United Kingdom	The ship foundered near Loch Ryan. She was on a voyage from Belfast, County Antrim to Workington, Cumberland.
Courier	United States	The ship foundered whilst on a voyage from Batavia, Netherlands East Indies to New York. Her crew were rescued by Sabina (United Kingdom).
Belle Rock	United Kingdom	The ship was driven ashore and wrecked at Waterford.
Hortensis	Hamburg	The ship ran aground on the Small Vogelsand, in the North Sea. She was on a voyage from Rio de Janeiro, Brazil to Hamburg. Hortensis was refloated and put into Cuxhaven.
Robert McWilliam	United Kingdom	The ship was driven ashore on Gromsay, Orkney Islands. She was on a voyage from Quebec City, Lower Canada, British North America to Aberdeen. Robert McWilliam was later refloated.

== 24 November ==
List of shipwrecks: 24 November 1839
Ship	State	Description
Earl Percy	United Kingdom	The ship was driven ashore on Saltholm, Denmark. She was on a voyage from Saint Petersburg, Russia to London. Earl Percy was later refloated; she arrived at Leith, Lothian on 30 November.
Kingston	United Kingdom	The ship sprang a leak and was beached at Stromness, Orkney Islands. She was on a voyage from Quebec City, Lower Canada to Aberdeen.
William and Ann	United Kingdom	The brig ran aground on the Burrows Sand, in the North Sea off the coast of Essex. She was on a voyage from North Shields, County Durham. William and Ann was refloated with assistance from the smacks Adamant, Eagle, Elizabeth and Gipsey (all United Kingdom).

== 25 November ==
List of shipwrecks: 25 November 1839
Ship	State	Description
Colebrooke	(United Kingdom of Great Britain and Ireland) Barbados	The schooner was wrecked at the mouth of the Courantyne River. Her crew were rescued. She was on a voyage from Barbados to Berbice, British Honduras.
Humility	United Kingdom	The ship was driven ashore at Hartlepool, County Durham.
HMS Pelorus	Royal Navy	HMS Pelorus. The Cruizer-class brig-sloop was driven ashore at Port Essington, New South Wales with the loss of twelve of her crew. She was refloated 86 days later.

== 26 November ==
List of shipwrecks: 26 November 1839
Ship	State	Description
Brothers	United Kingdom	The ship struck the Grimstons, in the North Sea off the coast of County Durham. She consequently put into Lindisfarne, Northumberland.
Flora	United Kingdom	The ship was driven ashore on Saltholm, Denmark. She was on a voyage from Riga, Russia to Hull, Yorkshire. Flora was later refloated and towed to Copenhagen for repairs.
Maria	United Kingdom	The ship was drivenashore near Miramichi, New Brunswick, British North America. She was on a voyage from Quebec City, Lower Canada, British North America to Miramichi.
New St. George	United Kingdom	The ship was driven ashore at Lancaster, Lancashire. She was on a voyage from Liverpool to Lancaster.
Philadelphia	United States	The ship was driven ashore on "Sunda Island" or "Tendo Island, in the Black Sea. Her crew were rescued. She was on a voyage from Constantinople, Ottoman Empire to Odesa.
William's Increase	United Kingdom	The ship was wrecked on the Shipwash Sand, in the North Sea off the coast of Essex. Her crew were rescued. She was on a voyage from London to Great Yarmouth, Norfolk.

== 27 November ==
List of shipwrecks: 27 November 1839
Ship	State	Description
Ebenezer	United Kingdom	The ship ran aground on the Andrews Shoal, off Felixtowe, Suffolk. She was on a voyage from Swansea, Glamorgan to Mistley, Essex. Ebenezer was refloated with assistance from Industry (United Kingdom) and taken into Harwich, Essex.
Flor de Mayo	Spain	The ship was wrecked on Ginger Key. All on board were rescued. She was on a voyage from Santander to Havana, Cuba.
Scheld	Netherlands	The barque struck a rock and sank at Ascension Island. Her crew were rescued by Melville (United Kingdom). Scheld was on a voyage from Batavia, Netherlands East Indies to Rotterdam, South Holland.

== 28 November ==
List of shipwrecks: 28 November 1839
Ship	State	Description
Brilliant	United Kingdom	The ship foundered in the North Sea off Whitby, Yorkshire. She was driven ashore in a capsized condition on 2 December and was wrecked.
Brothers	United Kingdom	The sloop was driven ashore at Sea Palling, Norfolk. She was on a voyage from Boston, Lincolnshire to Norwich, Norfolk.
John and Ann	United Kingdom	The ship was driven ashore and wrecked at Whitby. Her crew were rescued.
Magdalena	United Kingdom	The ship sank at Tarragona. She was on a voyage from Tarragona to Plymouth, Devon.
Nolsomheden	Flag unknown	The ship was severely damaged at Tarragona.
Peterhead Packet	United Kingdom	The ship ran aground and was damaged on the Herd Sand, in the North Sea off the coast of County Durham. She was later refloated.
Riga Packet	Netherlands	The ship was driven ashore and wrecked near "Wyborg". Her crew were rescued. She was on a voyage from Rotterdam, South Holland to Saint Petersburg, Russia.
HMS Tribune	Royal Navy	The sixth rate was driven ashore and wrecked at Tarragona, Spain. Her crew survived.
Virginia	United Kingdom	The ship was wrecked in the Bay of Tangier. She was on a voyage from Odesa to Cork.

== 29 November ==
List of shipwrecks: 29 November 1839
Ship	State	Description
Ariel	United Kingdom	The brig was driven ashore and wrecked between Alnmouth and Warkworth, Northumberland with the loss of all hands.
Baltic	United Kingdom	The brig was driven ashore at Sunderland, County Durham.
Celia	United Kingdom	The ship struck the Bridges, in the Irish Sea off Groomsport, County Down and sank.
Dorothea	United Kingdom	The ship was driven ashore and wrecked at Scoughall, Lothian. Her crew were rescued. She was on a voyage from Fårö, Sweden to Newcastle upon Tyne, Northumberland.
Eagle	United Kingdom	The brig was driven ashore near Hendon, County Durham. She was on a voyage from Hull, Yorkshireto Sunderland. Eagle had become a weck by 3 December.
Friendship	United Kingdom	The brig was wrecked on the Docking Sand, in the North Sea. Her crew were rescued by Defence (United Kingdom). She was on a voyage from Newcastle upon Tyne, Northumberland to London.
Hart	United Kingdom	The schooner was wrecked on the Buddan Rocks, off the coast of Forfarshire with the loss of all hands. She was on a voyage from Grangemouth, Stirlingshire to Rotterdam, South Holland, Netherlands.
Miriam	United Kingdom	The brigantine was abandoned in the Atlantic Ocean. Her crew were rescued by Lallah Rookh (United Kingdom) before she foundered. Miriam was on a voyage from Saint John's, Newfoundland, British North America to Falmouth, Cornwall.
Medusa	United Kingdom	The brig was driven ashore and wrecked at Filey, Yorkshire with the loss of a crew member.
Oby	United Kingdom	The ship was driven ashore at Great Yarmouth, Norfolk. She was on a voyage from Great Yarmouth to London. Oby was refloated on 2 December.
Prins Veld, or Prins Veld Marschalk	Netherlands	The ship ran aground on the Pampees, off the coast of Zeeland. She was on a voyage from Hellevoetsluis, Zeeland to Batavia, Netherlands East Indies. She was refloated on 30 November and resumed her voyage.
Russell	United Kingdom	The ship was driven ashore and damaged at Poole, Dorset. She was on a voyage from Sunderland, County Durham to Poole. Russell was refloated the next day and taken into Poole.
Soken	United Kingdom	The ship struck the pier at Ramsgate and sank.. She was on a voyage from Scarborough, Yorkshire to Ramsgate. Soken was later refloated.
Tender	Trinity House	The yacht was driven ashore and wrecked on Flat Holm, Glamorgan.
Thames	United Kingdom	The ship was driven ashore and wrecked at Whitby, Yorkshire. Her crew were rescued by the Whitby Lifeboat.
Trois Frères	Belgium	The ship was driven ashore at Thornham, Norfolk, United Kingdom. She was on a voyage from Ostend, West Flanders to King's Lynn, Norfolk.

== 30 November ==
List of shipwrecks: 30 November 1839
Ship	State	Description
Arthur	United Kingdom	The ship was wrecked on the Teignmouth Rocks, County Durham. Her crew were rescued by the North Shields Lifeboat. She was on a voyage from Sunderland to South Shields. Arthur was refloated on 7 January 1840 and taken into South Shields.
Betsey and Martha	United Kingdom	The ship sprang a leak and was beached at Porthdinllaen, Caernarfonshire. She was on a voyage from Port Madoc to Dublin. Betsey and Martha was refloated on 10 December and taken into Porthdinllaen.
Comus	Prussia	The ship was driven ashore at Swinemünde, where she was subsequently wrecked. She was on a voyage from Memel to Swinemünde.
Enterprise	United Kingdom	The schooner was wrecked on the Teignmouth Rocks. Her crew were rescued by Dennett's Apparaus. She was on a voyage from Newcastle upon Tyne to Jersey, Channel Islands.
Friendship	United Kingdom	The ship was wrecked on the Dorking Sands, in the North Sea off the coast of Lincolnshire. Her crew were rescued. She was on a voyage from Newcastle upon Tyne to London.
Hector	Netherlands	The ship was driven ashore at Málaga, Spain. She was on a voyage from Cephalonia, United States of the Ionian Islands to Amsterdam, North Holland.
Humanity	United Kingdom	The ship was driven ashore and severely damaged at Hartlepool, County Durham.
Isabella	United Kingdom	The ship was wrecked on the Teignmouth Rocks. Her crew were rescued by the North Shields Lifeboat. She was on a voyage from Sunderland to South Shields.
Margaret	United Kingdom	The ship was wrecked on the Isle of May, Fife. She was on a voyage from Riga, Russia to Montrose, Forfarshire.
Petrel	United Kingdom	The brig was wrecked at the mouth of the River Forth with the loss of all but one of the eleven people on board. She was on a voyage from Dalhousie, Lothian to Stockton-on-Tees, County Durham.
Providoacia	Portugal	The ship was driven ashore at Gibraltar. She was later refloated.
Trusty	United Kingdom	The brig ran aground on the Blythe Sand. She was on a voyage from Saint Petersburg, Russia to London. Trusty was refloated on 1 December with assistance from the steam tug Copeland (United Kingdom) and taken into Deptford, Kent.

== Unknown date ==
List of shipwrecks: Unknown date in November 1839
Ship	State	Description
Ann	United Kingdom	The ship was wrecked in the Atlantic Ocean 50 nautical miles (93 km) south west of Cape Clear Island, County Donegal in later November with some loss of life.
Bell-Rock	United Kingdom	The ship was driven ashore at Aberavon, Glamorgan. She was refloated on 3 May 1840 and towed into Port Talbot, Glamorgan.
Britannia	(United Kingdom of Great Britain and Ireland) New South Wales	The ship departed from Port Phillip for Sydney. No further trace, presumed foundered with the loss of all hands.
Bure	United Kingdom	The ship was driven ashore on Eierland, North Holland, Netherlands. She was on a voyage from Liverpool, Lancashire to Amsterdam, North Holland. Bure had been refloated by 15 November.
Camille	France	The ship was driven ashore in Gibraltar Bay between 11 and 15 November. She was on a voyage from Toulon, Var to Rouen, Seine-Inférieure.
Catherine	United Kingdom	The brig was abandoned in the Atlantic Ocean before 25 November.
Clarkson	United Kingdom	The ship was wrecked on the Sandhammer Reef, in the Baltic Sea. Her crew were rescued. She was on a voyage from "Wyborg" to Hull, Yorkshire.
Cygne	France	The brig was abandoned off "Abreuvrach" with the loss of three of her eight crew.
Duncan	United Kingdom	The barque was wrecked on the Matanilla Reef (27°04′N 79°11′W) before 15 November.
Elizabeth	United Kingdom	The ship was wrecked in Algoa Bay before 23 November. Her crew were rescued. She was on a voyage from Madras, India to Liverpool.
Emigrant	United Kingdom	The ship was wrecked on "Massacre Island". She was on a voyage from Liverpool to Mobile, Alabama, United States.
Enterprise	United Kingdom	The steamship was driven ashore and damaged in the Dardanelles. She was on a voyage from London to Constantinople, Ottoman Empire. Enterprise was refloated on 29 November and taken into Constantinople.
Friends	United Kingdom	The ship was driven ashore at Frieston, Lincolnshire. She had been refloated by 6 November.
George	United Kingdom	The ship was driven ashore at Shoreham-by-Sea, Sussex. She was refloated on 1 December.
Hamilton	United States	The brig was driven ashore at Gibraltar before 30 November. She was refloated on 5 December.
John Thompson	United Kingdom	The ship was driven ashore at Blackhouse, Hampshire. She was refloated on 6 November.
Malton	United Kingdom	The ship was driven ashore at Büyükdere, Ottoman Empire between 25 and 28 November. She was on a voyage from Newcastle upon Tyne, Northumberland to Constantinople, Ottoman Empire. Malton was refloated on 29 November.
Otter	United Kingdom	The ship foundered in the Sea of Azov.
Prince Le Boo	United Kingdom	The ship was wrecked at Strømsø, Norway. Her crew were rescued. She was on a voyage from Arkhangelsk, Russia to Hull.
Protector	United Kingdom	The ship was driven ashore in the Dardanelles before 24 November. She was refloated on 29 November and taken into Constantinople.
Snowdrop	United Kingdom	The ship was driven ashore at Margate, Kent. She was on a voyage from Constantinople to London. Snowdrop was refloated on 7 November and put into Stangate Creek.
Sophia	United Kingdom	The ship was driven ashore at Cley-next-the-Sea, Norfolk. She was on a voyage from Goole, Yorkshire to Great Yarmouth, Norfolk. Sophia had been refloated by 6 November and taken into Cley-next-the-Sea.
Susan and Sarah	United Kingdom	The ship ran aground on the Gunfleet Sand, in the North Sea off the coast of Essex. She was on a voyage from London to Newcastle upon Tyne, Northumberland. Susan and Sarah was refloated and taken into Harwich, Essex.
Susannah	United Kingdom	The ship was abandoned in the Irish Sea. She was on a voyage from Cork to Newport, Monmouthshire. Susannah was taken into Milford Haven, Pembrokeshire on 16 November.
Time	United Kingdom	The ship was driven ashore at Pill, Glamorgan. She was on a voyage from Bristol, Gloucestershire to Swansea, Glamorgan. Time had been refloated by 25 November.
Whim	(United Kingdom of Great Britain and Ireland) Saint Vincent	The sloop was wrecked on Union Island before 6 November.
