= Lalla Rookh (1823 ship) =

Brig built in 1823

History

United Kingdom of Great Britain and Ireland
- Name: Lalla Rookh
- Launched: c.1923
- Fate: Wrecked at Pondicherry, India, 6 March 1828

General characteristics
- Class & type: Brig
- Tons burthen: 380-400 tons

Lalla Rookh was a 380-ton sailing vessel, possibly a brig and most likely built in 1823. She traded in North and South America, and transported a steam engine to New South Wales and a detachment of troops to Brisbane in 1825. She later traded and carried passengers between the East Indies, India and Britain. She was under the command of Captain Green until November 1827, when she came under the command of Captain McCallum, and was wrecked at Pondicherry on 6 March 1828.

== Construction ==
Lalla Rookh was a 380-ton sailing vessel.

== Captain Stewart ==
On 8 August 1823, the "fine new ship Lalla Rookh", 380 tons, advertised for passengers in the Liverpool Mercury. She was "constructed and intended for a regular trader, [so] particularly adapted for dry goods, and has excellent accommodation for passengers". Intended to succeed the Corsair, she was scheduled to sail for Charleston on 1 September 1823, under Captain Hugh Stewart. On 14 November she was reported to be on her way and due to arrive in Charleston in 23 days' time. On 12 December 1823 she was reported to have brought cotton and other goods to Liverpool for various companies.

On 19 July 1824 she left Liverpool for Rio de Janeiro, and was expected there in 41 days. (Note: Not sure whether the 41 days is from publication date in September or from departure date.?) On 26 November 1824 she was reported having returned from Brazil, specifically Bahia and Maceió (written "Macaio"), bringing sweetmeats and cotton. She had made the "extraordinarily rapid passage" of 27 days from Macaio, but "the fine ship Lalla Rookh [under] Captain Stewart" had run into storms near the port and been driven onto rocks. However her cargo was recovered and she was not badly damaged.

On 21 February 1825 she was reported to be on her way to New South Wales, off Tuskar Rock (in the Irish Sea). On July 15, with Captain Stewart in command, she delivered a steam engine to Sydney, and brought with her at least two settlers. She was reported as at New South Wales on 2 July, "sailing for Melville Island and Batavia (present-day Jakarta) on the 29th". She was the first sizeable ship to visit Moreton Bay in July 1825. Under Captain Stewart, she sailed Sydney to Brisbane, and then landed a detachment of the 40th Regiment near Amity Point before sailing on to Calcutta. On 13 September 1825 she left Batavia for Singapore. After leaving Penang on 24 October, she arrived at Deal, Kent ready to sail upriver to London, still under Stewart, on 13 February 1826.

On 5 June 1826, "the fine new ship, burthen 400 tons", "an extraordinarily fast sailer", was advertising passage for passengers and freight to Madras, Penang and Singapore, under Hugh Stewart, Royal Navy Commander, "well-known in the East India trade", due to leave on 25 June. On 19 July the ship left Portsmouth for Madras.

On 2 January 1827 Lalla Rookh returned from Madras and was due to sail to Penang in February; On 1 June 1827 she returned to Deal from Penang and sailed again on 20 February (?) under Captain Stewart.

== Captain McCallum ==
She was recorded as leaving Portsmouth for Madras, Penang and Singapore under the command of Captain McCallum on 5 November 1827, arriving on 19 February 1828, taking 105 days to accomplish the journey, which he had promised to undertake in under 110 days.

=== March 1828 wrecking ===
She was "totally wrecked" on 6 March 1828 at Pondicherry, one day out on a voyage from Madras to Penang under the command of Captain McCallum.
