= George Fraser =

George Fraser may also refer to:

- George Fraser (New Zealand engineer) (1832–1901), New Zealand engineer, foundry proprietor and ship owner
- George Fraser (Canadian football) (1911–1992), Canadian football player
- George Fraser (footballer) (1881–1951), Scottish football player and manager
- George Fraser (horticulturist) (1854–1944), British horticulturist, hybridizer of rhododendrons
- George Fraser (Nova Scotia politician) (died 1899), Canadian politician and former mayor of Halifax
- George MacDonald Fraser (1925–2008), British author
- George R. Fraser (born 1932), medical geneticist
- George Sutherland Fraser (1915–1980), British poet
- George Willoughby Fraser (1866–1923), British civil engineer and Egyptologist
- George Henry Fraser (died 1919), navigator and aircraft mechanic
- George Arthur Fraser (1866–1930), Canadian politician
- George Fraser (rugby union)

== See also ==
- James George Frazer (1854–1941), anthropologist
- George Fraser Kerr (1895–1929), Canadian recipient of the Victoria Cross
- George Frazier (disambiguation)
