= Rotomahana (ship) =

Rotomahana is the name of the following ships, named for Lake Rotomahana:

- Rotomahana (barque), a four-masted barque launched in 1881 and wrecked 20 August 1884
- SS Rotomahana (1876), the first iron vessel built in Auckland, New Zealand, beached for use as a wharf in 1924
- SS Rotomahana (1879), the first ocean-going steamer built of mild steel, scuttled in 1928
