= SS Tauranga =

New Zealand coastal trading steam ship

Coordinates: 36.124°S 174.768°E

History

New Zealand
- Name: Tauranga
- Owner: Bay of Plenty Steam Navigation Co
- Builder: Fraser & Tinne, Auckland
- Launched: 27 March 1867
- Completed: 21 June 1867
- Stricken: 23 July 1870
- Homeport: Auckland
- Identification: 52439
- Fate: Sank after collision with schooner Enterprise between Cape Rodney and Sail Rock

General characteristics
- Type: Topsail schooner
- Tonnage: Registered 95 tons, 70 tonsdwt
- Length: keel 108 ft (33 m), overall 120 ft (37 m)
- Beam: 17 ft 6 in (5.33 m)
- Draught: 7 ft 6 in (2.29 m)
- Depth of hold: 8 ft (2.4 m)
- Propulsion: 75 horsepower steam engine
- Speed: 10.75 mph (17.30 km/h)
- Capacity: 24 passengers

SS Tauranga was the first coastal trading steam ship to be built in New Zealand, though a harbour steamer, Governor Wynyard, had been built at Auckland in 1851.

She was launched at Henry Niccol's North Shore yard in Auckland on 27 March 1867. Tauranga was a kauri-built, twin screw, 70 ton dwt, top-sail schooner, built for Bay of Plenty Steam Navigation Co.

Engines and other fitting out works were done by Fraser & Tinne's Phoenix Foundry at Mechanics Bay. Tauranga's engines had a jet condenser 20-inch (510 mm) cylinders, an 18-inch (460 mm) stroke and ran at 25 psi (170 kPa) to produce 30 to 35 hp (26 kW) and, although only designed for 7kn, she achieved a trial speed of 8 kn (15 km/h; 9.2 mph)

She was built for the Auckland-Tauranga-Opotiki service, but also followed the 50 mi (80 km) Auckland–Thames route. She replaced an earlier schooner on the Auckland-Tauranga route, also called Tauranga.

She made a trial trip on 13 June 1867. With the exception of the imported shaft forgings, all the machinery was built by Phoenix Foundry, the first marine condensing engines constructed in the colony. The engine design was by Mr. Lowenhagen, who was formerly connected with E. and W. Hawthorne, of Newcastle-upon-Tyne. The engine, weighing about 30 tons, had to be moved over a poor road to the beach and lifted from the beach in Mechanics Bay with a flax rope spun by Fraser and Tinne's machinery. on the downward trip eight miles and a quarter per hour, and returning, with one screw, six and a half miles. Her performance during this time was 3 5/8 miles (5.8 km) in 20 minutes, or 10 3/4 miles (17.3 km) an hour, with 23 1/2 lb (10.7 kg) of steam, and 20 inches (510 mm) vacuum. The boiler was a 20 ton three-furnace, multi-tubular boiler, with flat top and sides. To cope with the marine work they erected workshops in Mechanics Bay.

Tauranga sank, somewhere in Bream Bay, after a night-time collision on 23 July 1870 with an unlit ketch, Enterprise, with the loss of all 5 passengers and 14 crew. Initially she was replaced on the Tauranga route by SS Go Ahead. A fund to provide for the families of those drowned raised over £1,000.
