= GRIP1 =

GRIP1 may refer to:

- Nuclear receptor coactivator 2
- GRIP1 (gene)
- Glutamate receptor-interacting protein (GRIP)
