= Phoenix Foundry, Auckland =

Coordinates: 36.85°S 174.77°E

Phoenix Foundry
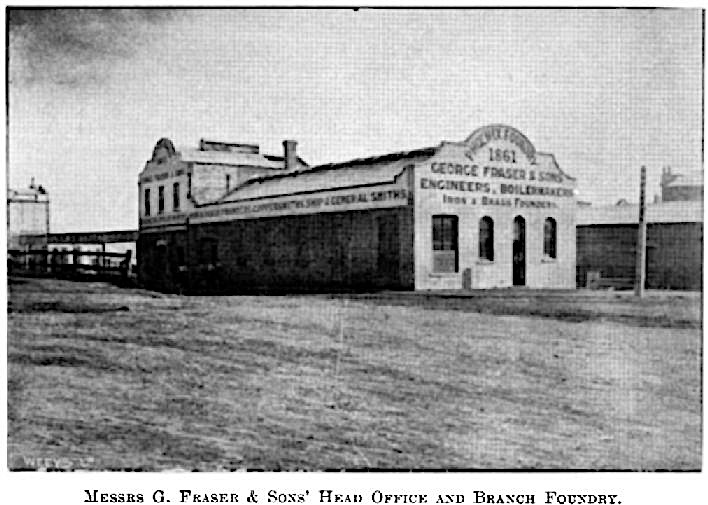
- Formerly: Fraser and Tinne; G Fraser & Sons
- Type: Public Listed Company
- Industry: engineering
- Founded: 1861
- Founders: George Fraser
- Headquarters: Auckland, New Zealand

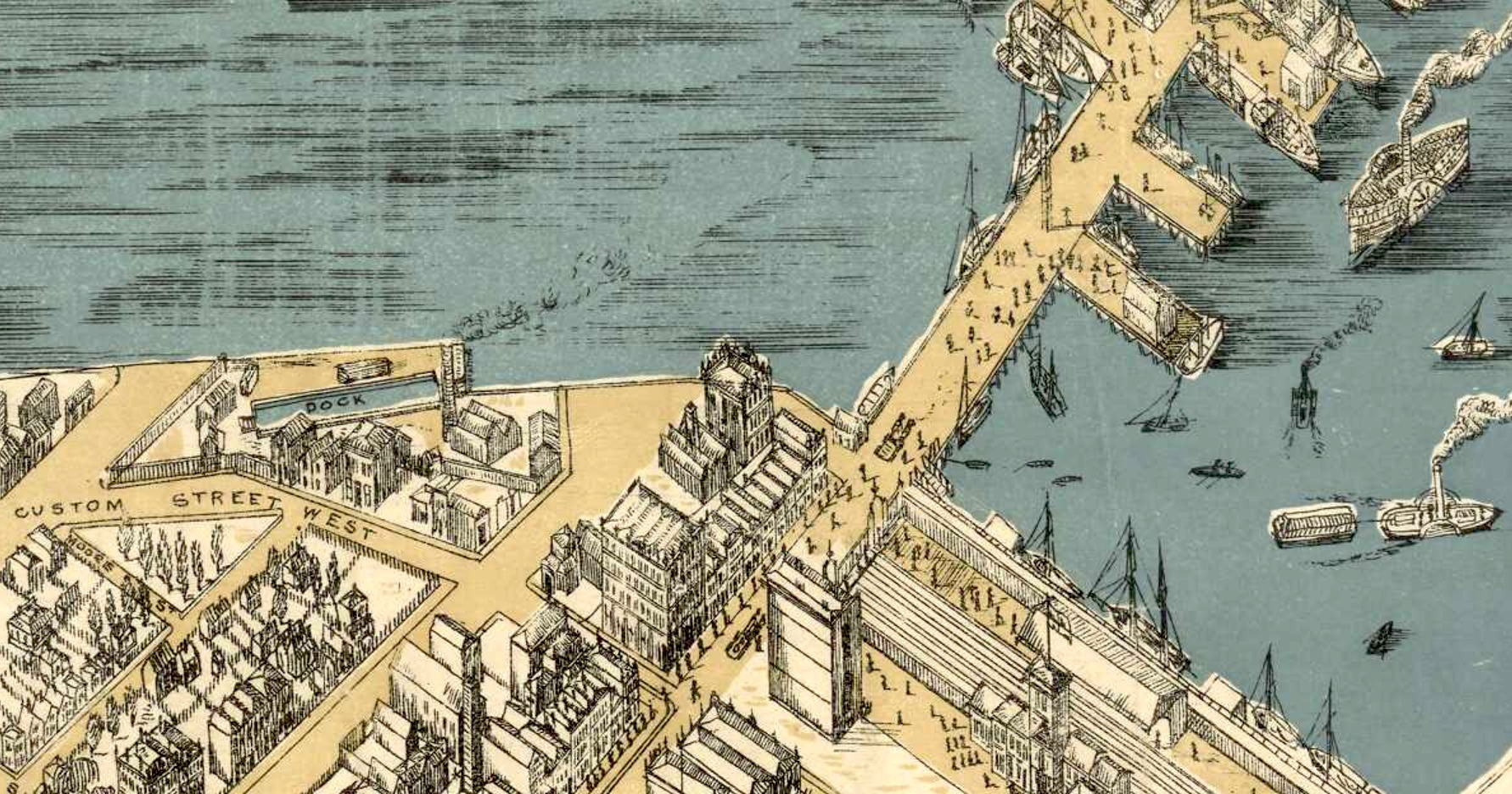
1886 Stevens birds-eye view of dry dock and head office site on the corner of Albert and Custom St

Phoenix Foundry, often printed as Phœnix, was an engineering company in Auckland from 1861 to 1952. By 1900, it was on the verge of bankruptcy, but also Auckland's largest engineering works, supplying a wide range of goods and often leading in the design of equipment used to exploit the country's resources, such as timber and flax mills, crushers for gold ore and locomotives, pumps, cement and gas works and steamers. The foundry started with engineer, George Fraser, and a handful of employees, but grew to employ hundreds and operated under several names, including Fraser and Tinne and George Fraser & Sons Ltd.

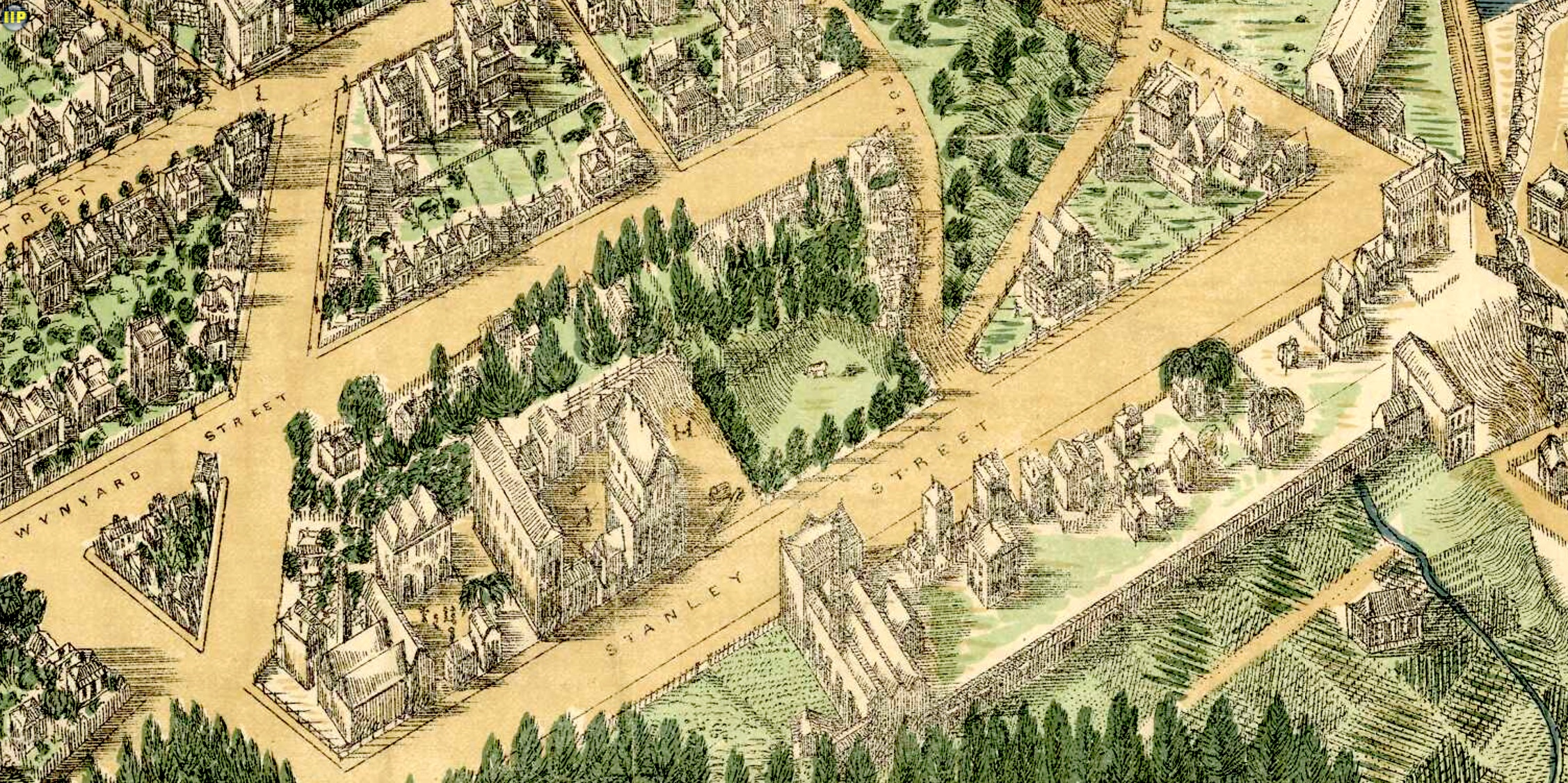
1886 birds-eye view of Stanley St and Grafton Road. The largest buildings in the street were those of the Phoenix Foundry

== Origins 1854-1863 ==
In 1854, Henry Allright, a civil engineer, and William Kinloch started a small iron foundry in Mechanics Bay, where the Auckland and Newmarket railway bridge now crosses Parnell Rise, but it was then beside the harbour. From 1859, it traded as Kinlock and Hill. In 1861, George Fraser bought it for £190 and employed about 30 hands to assemble and fit out imported threshing machines and portable engines. Orders for castings and iron work for the army during the 1863 invasion of the Waikato gave George a good start. The cupola for melting iron required 8 men to operate its bellows to provide a blast. George updated the plant.

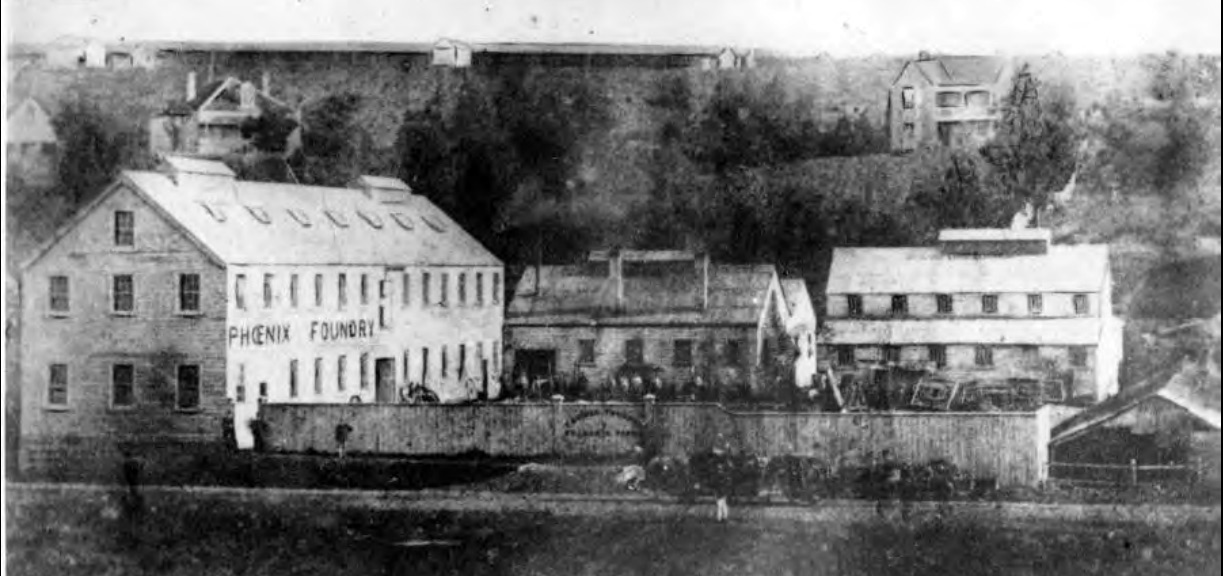
1864 Phoenix Foundry in Stanley St

== Move to Stanley Street - Fraser & Tinne 1864-1882 ==
Notice was given that the foundry site was required under the Auckland and Drury Railway Act 1863, so, in 1864, 2 acres (0.81 ha) were acquired in nearby Stanley Street, and a partnership began with Theodore Tinne. He was an engineer from Liverpool, where his family were merchants and had benefitted from government compensation paid when slavery was abolished. The Fraser and Tinne partnership lasted until 1881, 1883, or, more probably, 1882; George said the partnership ended on 10 May 1882, though an advert indicated Theodore left for England in 1885. Theodore's wife had died in 1880, shortly after the birth of his son.

The new foundry had a 132 ft (40 m)-long machine shop, a 10-ton crane, tramways, 3 forges, a brass foundry with 4 ton-crucibles, planing machines able to take iron up to 10 ft (3.0 m) x 4 ft (1.2 m), 2 steam hammers, drilling, nibbing, punching, shearing and boiler plate-bending machines and 8 lathes, able to turn anything up to 8 ft (2.4 m) diameter and cut screws up to 10 ft (3.0 m) x 4 in (100 mm). They were powered by a 9 hp horizontal steam-engine. In 1865 Phoenix advertised marine and land engines, railway plant, boiler making, saw mills, pumps, ornamental iron work, screw and paddle steamers, windlass metal, rudder bands, patent slips, wool presses, electric telegraphs and marine cables. They also produced flax-dressers, machinery and boilers for the stampers on the Thames goldfields, girders for a new Lunatic Asylum and equipment for a tannery at Panmure and Seccombe and Son's (later Lion) brewery.

A report on 26 September 1868 said the foundry had 80 staff and that, "On visiting the Phoenix Foundry yesterday, we were surprised to see the quantity of machinery that is being turned out, as well as at the extent of the premises and the mechanical appliances."

Phoenix was closely associated with the Onehunga ironworks from 1873, making much of its plant and using its products.

A large erecting shop was added in 1874.

=== Sawmills ===
Phoenix built all the machinery for the Auckland Sawmill Company, set up in 1863 in Mercury Bay, at what is now Whitianga. It was described as the largest saw-mill manufactured in the colony, with iron saw frames holding one to thirty saws each and patterns prepared for all sizes of saw-mills. The engines, boiler and breaking-down and circular saw benches were designed and erected by George's father-in-law, Alexander Davidson, who had arrived in Auckland by 1860. In the late 1870s, Phoenix was providing plant for mills being built at Aratapu (near Te Kōpuru), Tairua, Shortland (now south Thames), Mercury Bay and Cabbage Bay (now Colville).

=== Flax ===
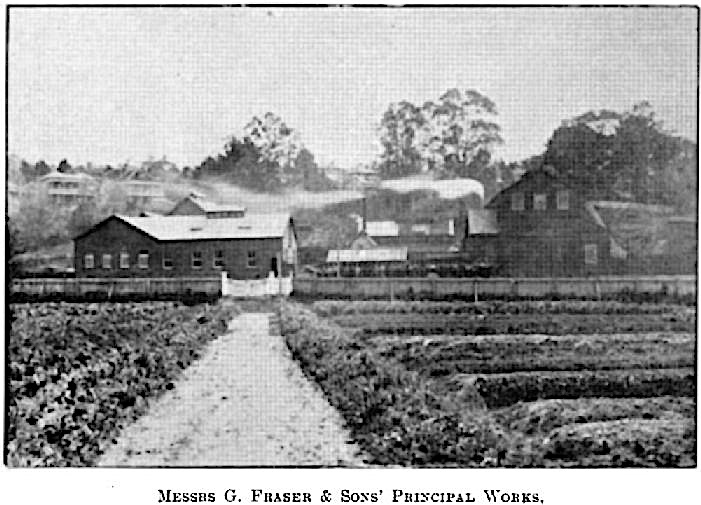
Phoenix Foundry in Stanley St about 1902

George invented and built a flax machine at the foundry, and it was said that nothing better has been devised to supersede it up to the present time and that it was the foundation of the flax-milling industry. The Auckland Rope and Twine Company's machinery in Stanley St was made by Phoenix in 1882, but losses brought about its sale to a Dunedin company, Donaghy, in 1894.

=== Ships ===
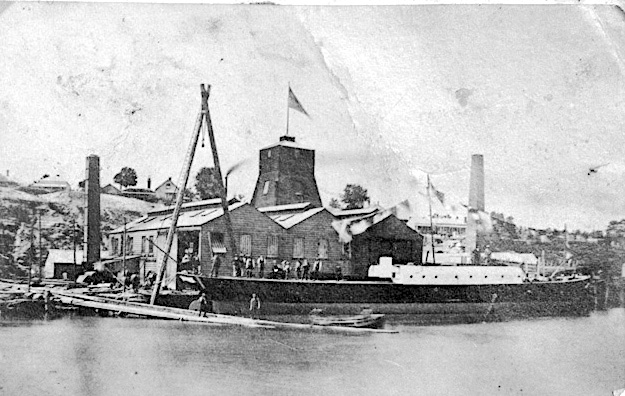
SS Rotomahana being fitted out at the 1874 Fraser and Tinne foundry, Mechanics Bay in 1876

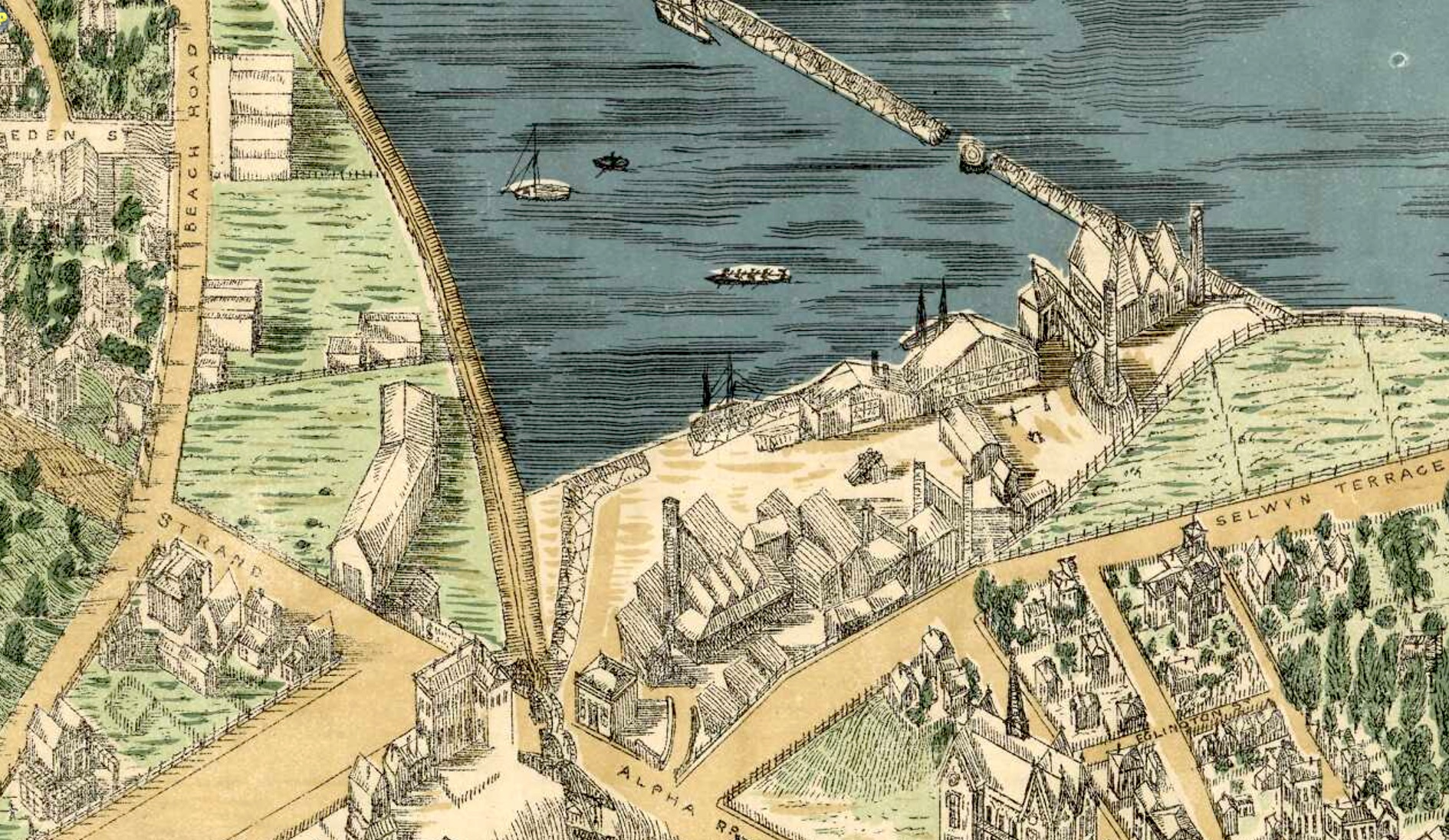
1886 birds-eye view of 1874 Mechanics Bay foundry

In 1867, Phoenix built engines for the kauri-built, twin screw, 70 ton dwt, top-sail schooner, Tauranga, the first coastal trading steamer built and engined in the colony, though a harbour steamer, Governor Wynyard, had been built at Auckland in 1851. The engine, weighing about 30 tons, had to be moved over a poor road to the beach and lifted from the beach in Mechanics Bay with a flax rope spun by the foundry's machinery.

In 1872, Phoenix re-engined Southern Cross with 90 psi (620 kPa), surface-condensing compound engines and high-pressure boilers, almost halving its coal consumption. It was the first marine compound engine in the country and it was reported that George Fraser almost failed to convince her owner, John Sangster Macfarlane, who reluctantly accepted the advice.

The conversion was a success and brought many more orders, so that the Mechanics Bay foundry was enlarged in 1874, with its own wharf, to increase boiler and repair capacity. The expanded site was on three sections of the Harbour Board reclamation in Mechanics' Bay. The staff increased to over 300. The first order was for four Government launches, followed by the first bucket dredge in country for the Harbour Board.

Part of the reason for the increase was that George and John Sangster formed syndicates between 1872 and 1878, with Alexander McGregor, William Laird, Captain Casey and D. B. and James Cruickshank. They built and operated many new compound-engined ships - Rowena, lona, Argyle, Staffa, Douglas, McGregor, Minnie Casey, Annie Millbank and Lily. Other work included engines and boilers for Star of the South, Kennedy (twin screw), Pilot, Douglas, Little Agnes, Ohinemuri, Weka and Rob Roy. The syndicates went on to form the Northern Steam Ship Company in 1881.

On 20 November 1876, Phoenix launched the first iron ship built in Auckland, the Rotomahana. This was followed by Rose Casey and Robert. flying their yellow house-flag with a phoenix

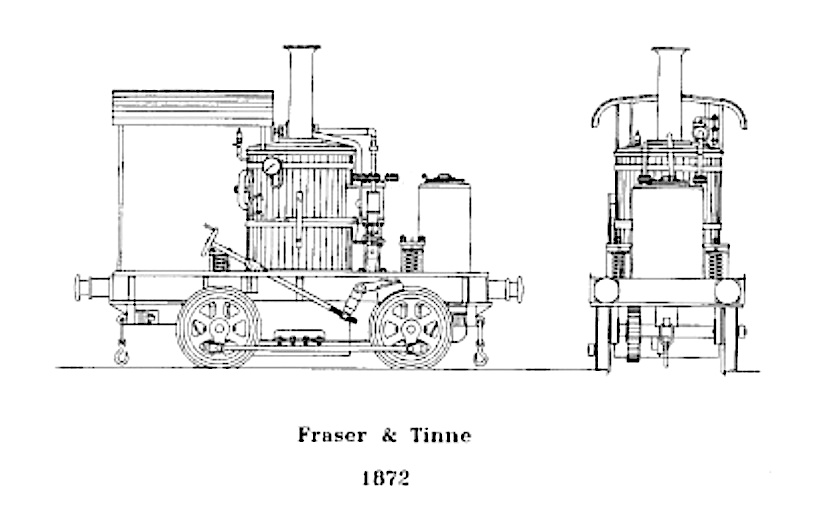
1872 design for vertical 0-4-0 engine used at Ngaere

=== Railways ===
Many of the railway bridges on the North Island Main Trunk line were supplied by Phoenix in the 1900s, with girders up to 80 ft (24 m) long. In the 1870s they also built at least two small locomotives, one for the Grahamstown tramway and the other for New Plymouth Sash & Door Co at Ngaere.

=== Gold ===
In 1867, Phoenix erected the first battery on the Thames Goldfields, at Kuranui. A gold extraction plant at Stanley Street could test lots to assess the viability of mining ventures and the works was soon at capacity. By 1868, Phoenix had built 15 batteries in the Thames area. George Fraser III became Engineer to Waitekauri Gold Mining Company in 1896. About 1900 Phoenix built four gold dredges for the South Island goldfields.

== George Fraser & Sons 1883-1900 ==
In January 1884, George gained fame by salvaging the 340 ft (100 m) steamer Triumph from the shore at Tiritiri Island. Although purchased for £2,100 and being greatly acclaimed, attempts to sell or trade the vessel profitably failed and it had to be sold in Britain in 1888 to stave off bankruptcy as the company struggled with recession. Triumph flew the company flag, depicting a phoenix on a yellow background.

In 1888, Phoenix helped build, and then used, Devonport's Calliope Dry Dock for repairs, as shown in a 1908 photo of Whangape.

Although generally described as a good employer, ten of Phoenix's employees took the company to court for wage arrears during the period leading up to bankruptcy in 1889. However, it was also described as minor and arrangements were made with creditors. By 1890 Phoenix claimed the problems were over.

A fire in 1893 destroyed patterns, drawings and much of the machinery at Stanley Street. Within a year, plant had been replaced and a new head office and smaller foundry opened on Customs Street, in the former Clyde Ironworks.

== George Fraser & Sons Ltd 1900-1952 ==
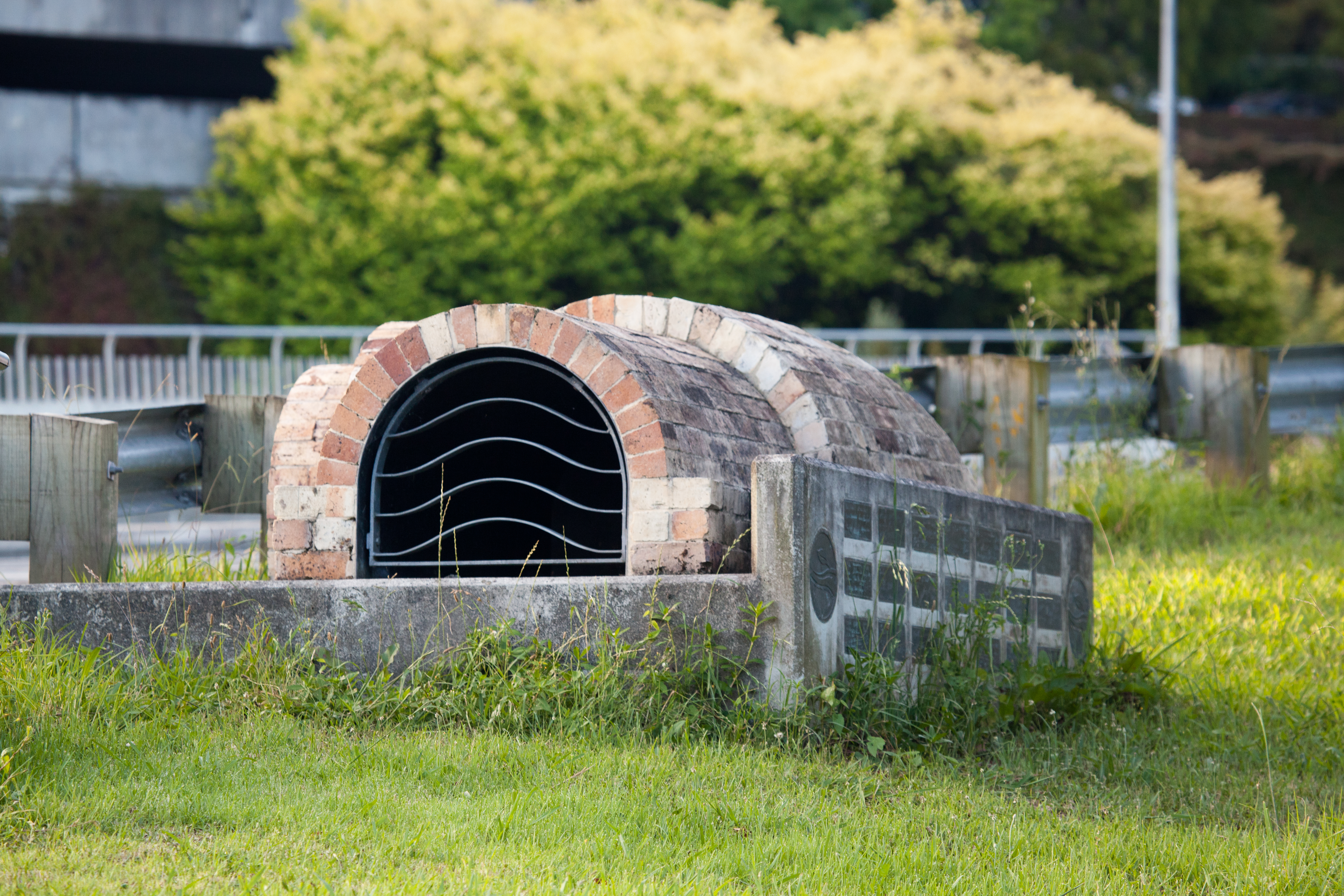
Phoenix Foundry memorial on Grafton Road

By 1900, the Phoenix Foundry was by far the largest engineering works in Auckland, with moulding equipment, steam hammers, heavy cranes, the shipyard. The lathes could turn up to 12 ft (3.7 m) diameter, there were two 10-ton overhead cranes, castings were up to 8 tons, a 12 ton steam hammer and over 100 staff.

The sons were taken into the business, without investing capital, on 10 May 1886, but George Fraser & Sons didn't become a limited company until June 1900, at a time when the partnership, George, George junior and William were facing bankruptcy. Half the shares were issued jointly to George and his son Joseph, with the remaining 3,000 allocated 999 each to George junior and Joseph, 599 to Elizabeth, 400 to John Ernest and one each to George, Elizabeth and Theodore Tinne Fraser. Samuel Fraser was assistant manager in the early 1890s and then built the Waikino Battery for the Waihi Company. William predeceased his father on October 31, 1900.

George Fraser IV took over the foundry after the death of his father in 1901. He had trained with Mort's Dock Engineering Co, as manager of their outdoor work. Phoenix closed after his death in 1933, during the Great Depression, but reopened around 1935. Joseph Fraser, the company's secretary and director, died in 1937. John Fraser was George's only surviving son and ran the firm until his death in 1944. The firm continued till 1950, or 1952, when Tappenden Motors took over. Tappenden applied for a licence to sell fuel in 1952. The site was sold after Alan Gibbs bought Tappenden, in a move which has been described as asset stripping.

Since then, Grafton Gully Bypass (part of the Central Motorway) was built, from 2001 to 2003, and University of Auckland Business School was built in 2003. Prior to the construction, an archaeological survey of the area of the Phoenix Foundry and the Fraser family house, exposed a furnace for scrap, with two buttressed brick flues. The curved flue, with bevelled arch bricks, was rebuilt on the corner of Stanley St and Grafton Road Bridge, on the Coast-to-Coast walkway. The survey also found 3 brick-lined industrial wells, relating to old breweries, bottlers and engineers,
