= George Frazier =

George Frazier may refer to:

- George Frazier (manager) (1861–1913), American baseball manager
- George Frazier (pitcher) (1954–2023), American baseball pitcher
- George Frazier (journalist) (1911–1974), American journalist
- George Frazier (author) (born 1966), American environmental writer

== See also ==
- George Fraser (disambiguation)
