= SS Go Ahead =

Coordinates: 39°38′40″S 177°05′35″E

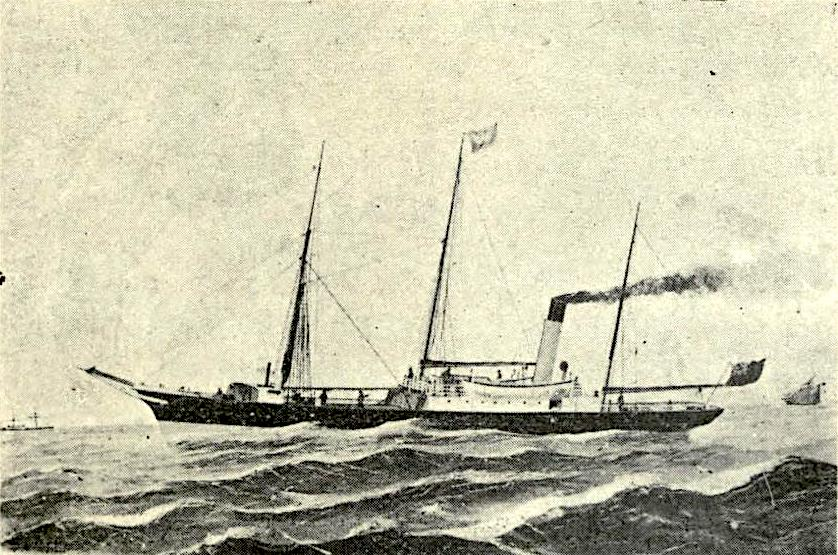
- S.S. Go Ahead 1867–1887

History

New Zealand
- Name: Go Ahead
- Owner: 1867–1870 Clyde Shipping Co; 4 Jan 1870 Samuel Hague Smith, Auckland; 1871 Peter Doile, Auckland; 1872 Taranaki Steam Navigation Co; 20 Mar 1878 Auckland Steam Shipping Company Ltd, Wellington; 3 Feb 1880 Walter & Charles Johnston, Wellington
- Builder: Thomas B Seath & Co, Upper Clyde
- Launched: 20 April 1867
- Stricken: 20 May 1887
- Home port: Auckland until 10 January 1878, then Wellington
- Identification: 56189
- Fate: Grounded at Cape Kidnappers in fog

General characteristics
- Type: Topsail schooner
- Tonnage: Registered 82 tons dwt
- Length: keel 110 ft (34 m), overall 120 ft (37 m)
- Beam: 20 ft (6.1 m)
- Draught: 4 ft 6 in (1.37 m)
- Depth of hold: 6 ft 9 in (2.06 m)
- Propulsion: Twin 2cyl (9"x 12") 30nhp, 2-screw; 1878 re-engined by Day, Summer & Co, Southampton Twin C2cyl (15" & 30"x 18") 45nhp
- Speed: 9 kn (17 km/h; 10 mph)

SS Go Ahead was a twin screw-steamer, launched on the afternoon of Saturday 20 April 1867 by Seath and Connell, of Rutherglen, for the Clyde Shipping Company, with a plan to use her in New Zealand coastal trading. She had 30, or 35 hp (26 kW), high pressure engines, and tubular boilers from Campbell & Son's foundry.

Go-a-head left Glasgow on 10 May and sailed to Melbourne, arriving on 2 November. An attempt to sell her failed, so on 2 December 1867 she left Hobson's Bay with a full cargo for Westport (then called Buller). She had to sail for an additional 12 days to get to Buller, where she briefly landed on the North Spit. This time she was advertised by Wellington agents, A. P. Stuart & Co, the sale notice saying she had, "a draught of 4 feet of water, will carry 1000 sheep. Highly suited for trading between this and the West Coast." The "highly suited" and "Must be sold, owner leaving the colony" claims may not have been true; she used her engines to get from Buller to Wellington, but, "finding steam could not be maintained with the bad coals she had on board, she ran for Nelson for better fuel".

She finally reached Wellington on 4 January 1868. Initially she was to sail for Napier, but additions and repairs, apparently amidst some delay, strife over payments and a failure to sell her, left her lying at Queen's wharf for months. A trial trip to Evans Bay showed the boiler was too small. There was a rumour of her carrying cattle from Whanganui to the West Coast and she was advertised many times, before going with Captain Mundle to Auckland in August.

== Initial Routes ==
During her 19 years in New Zealand waters Go-ahead visited most of the ports around the country.

When she was eventually sold to Auckland, the Thames gold rush was on, so Lalla Rookh and Go-ahead started on that route, with Go-ahead taking her first 25 passengers from Auckland on Tuesday 1 September 1868. She went to Bay of lslands on 16 September, it becoming a regular run, until SS Tauranga sank on 23 July 1870 and Go Ahead replaced her on the Tauranga route. In 1868 she visited Russell and called there regularly for about a year.

In 1875 Go Ahead was reported to have done five return trips for Auckland Steam Packet Co. between Auckland, Gisborne and Napier, four trips between Manukau, New Plymouth and Wanganui, and a round trip to Auckland via Wellington and Napier. In 3 months 12 days she burnt 289 tons of coal to cover 6,644 mi (10,692 km), or 97 lb (44 kg) per mile.

Then she visited many more ports, including Raglan in 1876, Napier, Gisborne, Thames, Auckland in 1877, occasionally called at other ports such as Tauranga when in need of shelter on the way, as well as covering for Rotomahana on the Thames run.

On 10 January 1878 Auckland Steam Packet Co. sold Go-Ahead for £2500 to what was described as a newly formed Auckland company.

== Incidents ==
Go Ahead had her own collision problem when she was said to be “going ahead full speed” on 3 September 1870 and collided with Ivanhoe not far from the spot where Tauranga sank, near Whangārei Heads. A Court of Inquiry found both masters at fault; Go Ahead had no forward lookout. There was little damage.

In 1877 Go Ahead stranded for a while on the South Spit whilst leaving Gisborne, and at one point was thought to be beyond salvage, not being able to be beached for repairs for about 3 weeks, whilst reports continued to say she was abandoned. A court decided the captain's mistake wasn't sufficient to suspend his certificate and the ship was back on a slipway on Auckland's North Shore, awaiting repairs, by July. Gouk & Cardon's £1400 tender for repair was accepted. At that time she was insured for £4,000.

In 1878 she broke down in a storm and had to sail to Onehunga. Next year she broke a propeller.

Those incidents maybe prompted her new owners, Johnston & Co, to give her more powerful engines, lengthen and reboiler her in 1879.

An 1879 collision with Hura, or Huia, off Ohau Point, again caused only minor damage and, again, both captains were blamed, but their certificates weren't suspended.

== Later routes ==
From 1878 she served Wellington-Napier but also continued to visit Gisborne and Auckland sometimes via Castle Point but also working on the west coast to Whanganui, about a 24-hour trip from Wellington. Occasional visits took Go Ahead as far as Onehunga and also to Waitara and Rangitīkei Port in 1878.

Foxton was visited in 1879, and she began serving southern ports at Dunedin, Oamaru, Timaru and sometimes Kaikōura and Lyttelton.

After her 1879 repair she was described as almost a new ship and continued to serve Castlepoint, Napier and, after a long absence, Whanganui. For a long time in the 1880s Go-Ahead served Wellington, Dunedin, Whanganui, Napier and ports in between.

== Wreck ==
Her final grounding came in 1887. She went ashore in "terribly thick weather" at Cape Kidnappers at 2am. James Gunning, a stoker was drowned. The fog was thick enough for Go Ahead to be in the breaking waves before it was known that anything was wrong. She later turned bottom upwards and largely broke up. Her insurance value with Union was £5,500.

The wreck inquiry found that Go-Ahead left Wellington for Napier on 18 May at 6pm, passed Cape Turnagain a day later, at 6pm on the 19th, and Blackhead at 9pm. By 1am on Friday 20th 1887 the wind and sea were increasing and Captain Plumley thought he was about six miles north of Cape Kidnappers and considered that Go Ahead was making 8½ to 9 knots. The Court considered that he was guilty of negligent navigation in trying to cut the headland too fine in the foggy weather and suspended his certificate for three months; by September, Captain Plumley was commanding the steamer Wallabi.

Banner & Liddle sold the hull and machinery to Mr. J. Hawkins for £13. The Fairy was used to attempt salvage, but with limited success due to poor weather. Another attempt with Bella was made to recover the boiler, but it was still there in 1937. A bell and compass from the ship were recovered and the boiler was said to be still there in 2011.
