= Cryptophthalmos =

- Other names: Cryptophthalmia
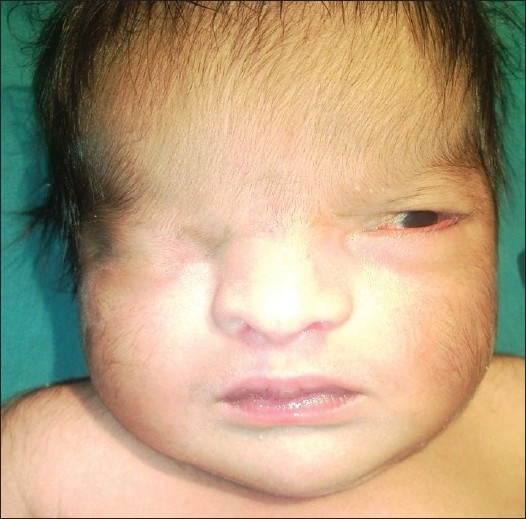
- Unilateral cryptophthalmos in an infant with Fraser syndrome
- Specialty: Medical genetics, ophthalmology

Cryptophthalmos is a rare congenital anomaly in which the skin is continuous over the eyeball with absence of palpebral fissures and presence of eyelashes. It is classified into three types: complete, incomplete and abortive. Failure of eyelid separation can be associated with maldevelopment of the underlying cornea and microphthalmia. Cryptophthalmos usually occurs on both sides and occurs in association with multiple other malformations collectively referred to as Fraser syndrome. Along with microphthalmia (small or underdeveloped globe), it may be associated with a tuft of hair.

== Signs and symptoms ==
Complete cryptophthalmos is the most severe form of cryptophthalomos. Complete cryptophthalmos is characterized by complete occlusion of the eye sockets and fusion of the skin on the forehead and cheeks. Those with complete cryptophthalmos have no eyebrows, gland structures, or eyelashes. They also lack a conjunctival sac and the overlying skin fuses with the cornea. Other deformities of the globe are often seen alongside complete cryptophthalmos.

Those with incomplete cryptophthalmos still have rudimentary eyelids as well as laterally placed small conjunctive sacs. Undeveloped parts of the eyelid still fuse to the malformed globe. The eye globe is typically smaller and covered by skin. In incomplete cryptophthalmos, the palpebral fissure is about a third of the typical length.

Ocular cysts can develop in both complete and incomplete forms of cryptophthalmos.

Abortive cryptophthalmos is characterized by the absence of the upper eyelid as well as 75% of the cornea adhered to and covered by the forehead skin. The eye globe size often varies in Abortive cryptophthalmos.

== Diagnosis ==
Ultrasound technology is able to detect cryptophthalmos around 18 weeks of gestation. Ultrasound will show a lack of palpebral fissure between the lower and upper eyelids. The skin from the cheek and forehead appears continuous on an ultrasound.

== Treatment ==
There is not much potential for perfect vision in cryptophthalmos, therefore treatment is mostly focused on the reconstruction of the eye. Surgery can be used to separate fused eyelids and restore some function. When surgery is not possible prosthetic eyelids may be used.
