= List of shipwrecks in August 1884 =

The list of shipwrecks in August 1884 includes ships sunk, foundered, grounded, or otherwise lost during August 1884.

== 1 August ==
List of shipwrecks: 1 August 1884
Ship	State	Description
Alfred	Canada	The barque caught fire off Cape Horn, Chile and was abandoned. All on board were rescued by Dunnerdale (United Kingdom). Alfred was on a voyage from Liverpool, Lancashire, United Kingdom to Valparaíso, Chile.
Industri	Norway	The schooner ran aground on the Finngrundet, in the Baltic Sea. She was on a voyage from Söderhamn, Sweden to Newhaven, Sussex, United Kingdom. She was refloated and taken in to Gävle, Sweden.
Yedmandale	United Kingdom	The steamship was driven ashore at Brindisi, Italy. She was on a voyage from Cardiff, Glamorgan to Brindisi.
Unnamed	United States	The pilot boat was run down and sunk at New York by the steamship Roma (Germany).

== 2 August ==
List of shipwrecks: 2 August 1884
Ship	State	Description
Dione	United Kingdom	The steamship was run into by the steamship Camden (United Kingdom) and sank in the River Thames downstream of Gravesend, Kent with the loss of 23 of the 40 people on board. Dione was on a voyage from London to Middlesbrough, Yorkshire.
USS Lancaster	United States Navy	The sloop-of-war ran aground on the South West Shingle Bank, in the Solent.
Margaretha Johanna	Germany	The schooner was driven ashore and wrecked at St. Monance, Fife, United Kingdom. She was on a voyage from East Wemyss, Fife to Bremerhaven.

== 4 August ==
List of shipwrecks: 4 August 1884
Ship	State	Description
Water Nymph	United Kingdom	The schooner was driven ashore and wrecked at Clifden, County Dublin. Her crew survived.

== 6 August ==
List of shipwrecks: 6 August 1884
Ship	State	Description
Shooting Star	United States	The schooner was wrecked on the coast of Nova Scotia, Canada. Her crew were rescued.

== 7 August ==
List of shipwrecks: 7 August 1884
Ship	State	Description
Budapest, and Lincoln	United Kingdom	The steamships collided at Liverpool, Lancashire and were both severely damaged. Budapest was on a voyage from Liverpool to Odesa, Russia. Lincoln was on a voyage from Sligo to Liverpool.
Falodden	United Kingdom	The steamship ran aground off Cape Bollard, Newfoundland Colony. She was on a voyage from Saint John, New Brunswick, Canada to Fleetwood, Lancashire. She was refloated and taken in to Saint John's, Newfoundland Colony.

== 8 August ==
List of shipwrecks: 8 August 1884
Ship	State	Description
Captain Parry	United Kingdom	The steamship was driven ashore at Kilcool, County Wicklow. She was refloated and taken in to Dublin.
Emberiza	United Kingdom	The steamship ran aground on the Urgents Shoals. She was refloated on 12 August and taken in to Gallipoli, Ottoman Empire.
Krageroe	Norway	The barque was driven ashore at Kastrup, Denmark. She was on a voyage from New York, United States to Stettin, Germany. She was refloated and resumed her voyage.
Susan Hendry	United Kingdom	The ship collided with the steamship Vigila (United Kingdom) and sank in the North Sea off Aldeburgh, Suffolk. Her crew were rescued by Vigila.

== 9 August ==
List of shipwrecks: 9 August 1884
Ship	State	Description
E. L. Rowe	United States	The schooner was lost on Avery's Ledge. Her crew were rescued.
Margaret Allen	United Kingdom	The brigantine was driven ashore and wrecked at Fair Head, County Antrim. Her crew survived. She was on a voyage from Kenvara, County Galway to Ardrossan, Ayrshire.
Martha Sephens	United States	The steamship struck a snag and sank in the Missouri River near Boonville Island, Missouri. Four crewmen were killed.

== 10 August ==
List of shipwrecks: 10 August 1884
Ship	State	Description
Red Rose	United Kingdom	The ship was driven ashore about five nautical miles (9.3 km; 5.8 mi) south-east of the Ar Men Lighthouse, Finistère, France.

== 11 August ==
List of shipwrecks: 11 August 1884
Ship	State	Description
Bowhead	United States	The whaler, a barque[rigged steamship, was holed by ice and sank in the Blossom Shoals (70°23′N 161°57′W) off Icy Cape, District of Alaska. Her crew were rescued by Balaena and Narwhal (Flags unknown).
Dronning Louisa	Denmark	The brig ran aground off Fair Isle, United Kingdom. She was on a voyage from Newcastle upon Tyne, Northumberland, United Kingdom to Rio de Janeiro, Brazil. She was later refloated and taken in to Lerwick, Shetland Islands, United Kingdom for repairs.
Nervi	Italy	The ship was run into by the steamship Kent and sank off Barry, Glamorgan, United Kingdom. Nervi was on a voyage from Pensacola, Florida, United States to Newport, Monmouthshire.
Werfa	United Kingdom	The steamship ran aground in the Guadiana. She was refloated and found to have been holed.

== 12 August ==
List of shipwrecks: 12 August 1884
Ship	State	Description
Aghios Nicholas	Greece	The schooner collided with the steamship Kovno (United Kingdom) and sank in the Doro Channel. Five of the 25 people on board were reported missing.
Concord	United Kingdom	The ship collided with the steamship Cearense (United Kingdom) and sank off the South Stack, Anglesey. Her crew were rescued by Cearense. Concord was on a voyage from Runcorn, Cheshire to Totness, Devon.
Ennismore	United Kingdom	The steamship ran aground on the Hen and Chickens Rock, off the Isle of Lewis, Outer Hebrides. She was refloated and put back to Stornoway, Isle of Skye.
M. E. Johnston	United Kingdom	The schooner was driven ashore at Ballywalter, County Antrim. She was on a voyage from Liverpool, Lancashire to Belfast, County Antrim. She was refloated and resumed her voyage.

== 13 August ==
List of shipwrecks: 13 August 1884
Ship	State	Description
Berwick	United Kingdom	The steamship sprang a leak and foundered off Huntcliffe, Yorkshire. Her sixteen crew were rescued. She was on a voyage from Sunderland, County Durham to Portsmouth, Hampshire.

== 14 August ==
List of shipwrecks: 14 August 1884
Ship	State	Description
Berwick	United Kingdom	The steamship foundered off Huntcliffe, Yorkshire. Her crew survived. She was on a voyage from Sunderland, County Durham to Portsmouth, Hampshire.
Eigil	United Kingdom	The brig collided with the schooner Harriet (United Kingdom) in the River Ouse and was beached at Whitton, Lincolnshire. Eigil was on a voyage from Gallipoli, Ottoman Empire to Goole, Yorkshire.
Monarch	United Kingdom	The ship was driven ashore in the Hooghly River. She was on a voyage from New York, United States to Calcutta, India.
Woodside	United Kingdom	The steamship was driven ashore and wrecked at the Cap de Creus, Spain. She was on a voyage from Cette, Hérault, France to an English port.

== 15 August ==
List of shipwrecks: 15 August 1884
Ship	State	Description
Abeona	United Kingdom	The sloop ran aground on the Shingles, off the Isle of Wight. She was refloated and taken in to Lymington, Hampshire.
Elborus	Imperial Russian Navy	The warship ran aground at Odesa.
Spartan	United Kingdom	The steamship suffered a breakdown of her machinery and was holed by her propeller shaft off Porto Santo Island, Madeira. She was on a voyage from Cape Town, Cape Colony to Plymouth, Devon and Southampton, Hampshire. She was towed in to Funchal, Madeira in a severely leaky condition on 17 August.

== 19 August ==
List of shipwrecks: 19 August 1884
Ship	State	Description
Sunbeam	United Kingdom	The smack foundered 3 nautical miles (5.6 km) east of Ballycotton, County Cork with the loss of her captain from her two crew.

== 20 August ==
List of shipwrecks: 20 August 1884
Ship	State	Description
Admiral	United States	The tug suffered a boiler explosion and sank at Chicago, Illinois with the loss of three of her crew.
Calder	United Kingdom	The steamship ran aground off Maryport, Cumberland and sank. She was on a voyage from the River Duddon to Maryport.
Prinses Wilhelmina	United Kingdom	The steamship ran aground at Zaandam, North Holland. She was on a voyage from Batavia, Netherlands East Indies to Amsterdam, North Holland.
Rotomahana	United Kingdom	The ship caught fire and was beached on the Elephant Keys, off East Falkland, Falkland Islands. Her crew survived. She was on a voyage from Liverpool, Lancashire to San Francisco, California, United States.

== 21 August ==
List of shipwrecks: 21 August 1884
Ship	State	Description
Loch Tay	United Kingdom	The steamship ran aground on the Mangro Cay Reef, off the coast of British Honduras and was wrecked. She was on a voyage from New York, United States to Belize City, British Honduras.
Margaret and Ann	United Kingdom	The schooner ran aground on the Conister Rock, in Douglas Bay.
Nio	United Kingdom	The brig was run into by the steamship European (United Kingdom) and sank at Greenwich, Kent.

== 22 August ==
List of shipwrecks: 22 August 1884
Ship	State	Description
Louise Marie	France	The schooner collieded with the steamship Bentinck (United Kingdom) 5 nautical miles (9.3 km) west of Cape Spartel, Morocco. At least some of her crew were rescued. Louise Marie was towed in to Tangier, Morocco in a sinking condition by the steamship Servando (Spain) the next day.

== 23 August ==
List of shipwrecks: 23 August 1884
Ship	State	Description
Chenhang	Imperial Chinese Navy	Sino-French War, Battle of Fuzhou: The armed transport was sunk by gunfire on the Min River at Fuzhou, China, by the cruisers D'Estaing, Duguay-Trouin, and Villars (all French Navy).
Feiyun	Imperial Chinese Navy	Sino-French War, Battle of Fuzhou: The sloop-of-war was sunk by gunfire on the Min River at Fuzhou by the cruisers D'Estaing, Duguay-Trouin, and Villars (all French Navy).
Fusheng	Imperial Chinese Navy	Sino-French War, Battle of Fuzhou: The flatiron gunboat was sunk by gunfire on the Min River at Fuzhou by the cruisers D'Estaing, Duguay-Trouin, and Villars (all French Navy).
Fuxing	Imperial Chinese Navy	Sino-French War, Battle of Fuzhou: The gunboat sank in the Min River at Fuzhou after being attacked successfully by a French Navy pinnace with a spar torpedo.
Ji'an	Imperial Chinese Navy	Sino-French War, Battle of Fuzhou: The sloop-of-war was sunk by gunfire on the Min River at Fuzhou by the cruisers D'Estaing, Duguay-Trouin, and Villars (all French Navy).
Jiansheng	Imperial Chinese Navy	Sino-French War, Battle of Fuzhou: The flatiron gunboat was sunk by gunfire on the Min River at Fuzhou by the cruisers D'Estaing, Duguay-Trouin, and Villars (all French Navy).
Laura Gertrude	Germany	The schooner ran aground off North Ronaldsay, Orkney Islands, United Kingdom. She was on a voyage from Drammen, Norway to an American port. She was refloated and anchored in a bay on North Ronaldsay pending repairs.
Yangwu	Imperial Chinese Navy	The wreck of Yangwu, photographed in 1884 Sino-French War, Battle of Fuzhou: The sloop-of-war exploded and sank in the Min River at Fuzhou after being attacked successfully by a French Navy torpedo boat with a spar torpedo.
Yongbao	Imperial Chinese Navy	The wreck of Yongbao (at left), photographed in 1884 Sino-French War, Battle of Fuzhou: The armed transport was sunk by gunfire on the Min River at Fuzhou by the cruisers D'Estaing, Duguay-Trouin, and Villars (all French Navy).
Zhenwei	Imperial Chinese Navy	Sino-French War, Battle of Fuzhou: The gunboat exploded and sank in the Min River at Fuzhou because of a single shell hit from the ironclad corvette Triomphante (French Navy).
No. 46	French Navy	Sino-French War, Battle of Fuzhou: The torpedo boat was hit by hand grenades thrown from a Chinese vessel in the Min River, bursting her boiler. She was scuttled by Volta (French Navy) to prevent her being captured by the Chinese.
Unnamed	Imperial Chinese Navy	Sino-French War, Battle of Fuzhou: The transport ship ran aground in the Min River and broke her back.

== 24 August ==
List of shipwrecks: 24 August 1884
Ship	State	Description
Benges	United Kingdom	The steamship struck a submerged rock north east of Trinidad and was wrecked. Her nineteen crew survived. She was on a voyage from Demerara, British Honduras to Puerto Cabello, Venezuela.
Margaret Kendall	United Kingdom	The schooner ran aground on the Proudfeet Rocks, on the coast of Caithness and sank.
USS Tallapoosa	United States Navy	The gunboat, a sidewheel paddle steamer, collided with the schooner J. S. Lowell (United States) and sank in Vineyard Sound approximately 5 nautical miles (9.3 km) from Vineyard Haven, Massachusetts with the loss of three of her crew. She was raised, repaired, and was returned to service in January 1886.
Unnamed	Imperial Chinese Navy	Sino-French War, Battle of Fuzhou: The torpedo launch was sunk by gunfire on the Min River at Fuzhou by the cruiser Duguay-Trouin (French Navy).
Unnamed	Imperial Chinese Navy	Sino-French War, Battle of Fuzhou: The torpedo launch was abandoned in the Min River at Fuzhou after she came under fire by the cruiser Duguay-Trouin (French Navy). Her crew swam to shore.

== 25 August ==
List of shipwrecks: 25 August 1884
Ship	State	Description
Minister von Schleinitz	Germany	The ship departed from Arkhangelsk, Russia for Grimsby, Lincolnshire, United Kingdom. No further trace, reported overdue.

== 26 August ==
List of shipwrecks: 26 August 1884
Ship	State	Description
Charles Jackson	(France) Mauritius	The ship was wrecked at Durban, Natal Colony. She was on a voyage from Liverpool, Lancashire, United Kingdom to Port Natal, Natal Colony.
Oberon	United Kingdom	The barque caught fire in the Pacific Ocean. She was abandoned the next day; her crew were rescued by Lord Clyde (United Kingdom). Oberon was on a voyage from South Shields, County Durham to San Francisco, California, United States.

== 28 August ==
List of shipwrecks: 28 August 1884
Ship	State	Description
Belmont	United States	The ferryboat was struck by a tornado and sank in the Ohio River between Evansville and Henderson, Indiana with the loss of 30 lives.
Marco Polo	Germany	The barque was wrecked on Fair Isle, United Kingdom with the loss of three of her 22 crew. She was on a voyage from Bremen to New York, United States.

== 29 August ==
List of shipwrecks: 29 August 1884
Ship	State	Description
Belmont	United States	The steamship capsized in a storm in the Ohio River 3 nautical miles (5.6 km) upstream of Henderson, Kentucky with the loss of 20-25 lives.
Resolven	United Kingdom	The abandoned ship was discovered by HMS Mallard (Royal Navy) between Baccalieu Island and Catalina, Newfoundland Colony. She was towed in to port. All eleven people that had been on board were presumed lost.

== 30 August ==
List of shipwrecks: 30 August 1884
Ship	State	Description
Gainford	United Kingdom	The steamship was driven ashore at "Codette", Brazil. She had become a wreck by November 1885.
Grassendale	United Kingdom	The ship was sighted off Anjer, Netherlands East Indies whilst on a voyage from New York, United States to Shanghai, China. No further trace, reported missing.

== Unknown date ==
List of shipwrecks: Unknown date in August 1884
Ship	State	Description
Adelaide	United Kingdom	The steamship sprang a leak and was beached at Drogheda, County Louth.
Adelphia	Norway	The barque was driven ashore at Cape Bollard, Newfoundland Colony. She was on a voyage from Porto, Portugal to Sydney, Nova Scotia, Canada. She was refloated and towed in to Saint John's, Newfoundland Colony in a leaky condition.
Bengeo	United Kingdom	The steamship ran ashore at Galera Point, Trinidad and was abandoned by her crew, who were rescued. She was on a voyage from Ayr to Demerara, British Guiana. She was abandoned as a total loss.
Britannia	United Kingdom	The steamship collided with another vessel and sank off Portland, Dorset. She was on a voyage from New York, United States to London.
Broomhaugh	United Kingdom	The steamship ran aground in the Nieuwe Waterweg. She was on a voyage from New York to Rotterdam, South Holland, Netherlands. She was refloated.
Caledonian	United Kingdom	The steamship was driven ashore at Cape Frio, Brazil. She was on a voyage from Rio de Janeiro, Brazil to Trieste. She subsequently broke in two and was a total loss.
Chusan	United Kingdom	The steamship ran aground in the Clyde. She was refloated on 7 August.
City of Merida	United States	The steamship was destroyed by fire at Havana, Cuba. She was on a voyage from Veracruz, Mexico to New York.
Ebenezer	Norway	The barque foundered in the Atlantic Ocean. Her crew were rescued by the barque Oliver Emery (United Kingdom). Ebenezer was on a voyage from Hamburg, Germany to Charleston, South Carolina, United States.
Edina	United Kingdom	The steamship ran aground in the Clyde. She was refloated on 7 August.
Gefion	Netherlands	The schooner ran aground at "Sonderose", Denmark. She was on a voyage from Stockholm, Sweden to an English port.
Ingram	United Kingdom	The steamship collided with the steamship Circassia (United Kingdom) off Ilfracombe, Devon and was severely damaged. Ingram was on a voyage from Antwerp, Belgium to Cardiff, Glamorgan.
Ithuriel	United Kingdom	The barque was driven ashore on Castle Island, Bahamas. She was on a voyage from Aux Cayes, Haiti to London.
Margaret Kendal	United Kingdom	The schooner was wrecked in Wick Bay with the loss of three or four of her crew.
Maria	Germany	The barque was driven ashore at Sonderose. She was on a voyage from Hull, Yorkshire, United Kingdom to Ystad, Sweden.
Middleton	United Kingdom	The steamship was driven ashore at Ystad, Sweden.
Norwegian	United Kingdom	The steamship ran aground at Three Rivers, Quebec, Canada. She was on a voyage from Montreal, Quebec to London.
Piskar	Imperial Russian Navy	The torpedo boat collided with the torpedo boat Swiristel (Imperial Russian Navy) and sank in the Bjoerkosund before 12 August.
Scylla	United Kingdom	The brigantine was driven ashore and wrecked on Langlade Island, Saint Pierre and Miquelon. Her crew were rescued. She was on a voyage from New Richmond, Quebec to Llanelly, Glamorgan.
Spartan	Hong Kong	The ship was lost in the China Seas.
Tetartos	Germany	The steamship ran aground 7 nautical miles (13 km) from Flensburg. She was on a voyage from Saigon, French Indo-China to Flensburg. She was refloated and completed her voyage.
Tintern Abbey	United Kingdom	The steamship was driven ashore at Kertch, Russia. She was on a voyage from Glasgow, Renfrewshire to Novorossiysk, Russia. She was refloated.
Wsryw	Imperial Russian Navy	The torpedo boat collided with a sailing ship between Kronstadt and Peterhof and was severely damaged.
Unnamed	United Kingdom	The hopper barge ran aground in the Clyde. She was refloated on 7 August.
Nineteen unnamed vessels	Flags unknown	Sixteen fishing smacks and three schooners were wrecked on the coast of the Newfoundland Colony before 25 August with the loss of six lives.
Unnamed	Flag unknown	The ship was driven ashore and wrecked in St. George's Bay before 25 August.
