= FREM2 =

Protein-coding gene in the species Homo sapiens

Identifiers
- Aliases: FREM2, FRAS1 related extracellular matrix protein 2, FRASRS2, FRAS1 related extracellular matrix 2, CRYPTOP
- External IDs: OMIM: 608945; MGI: 2444465; HomoloGene: 18454; GeneCards: FREM2; OMA:FREM2 - orthologs

Gene location (Human)
Chr.	Chromosome 13 (human)
Band	13q13.3	Start	38,687,077 bp
Band	13q13.3	End	38,887,131 bp

Gene location (Mouse)
Chr.	Chromosome 3 (mouse)
Band	3 C|3 25.24 cM	Start	53,421,359 bp
Band	3 C|3 25.24 cM	End	53,564,776 bp
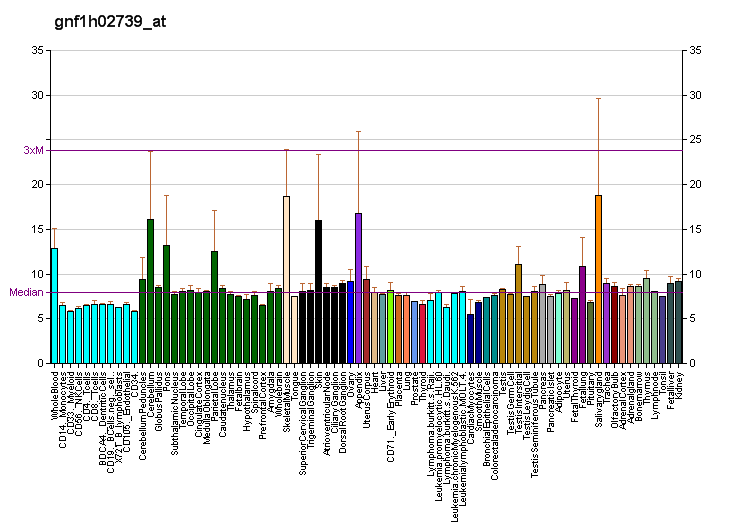

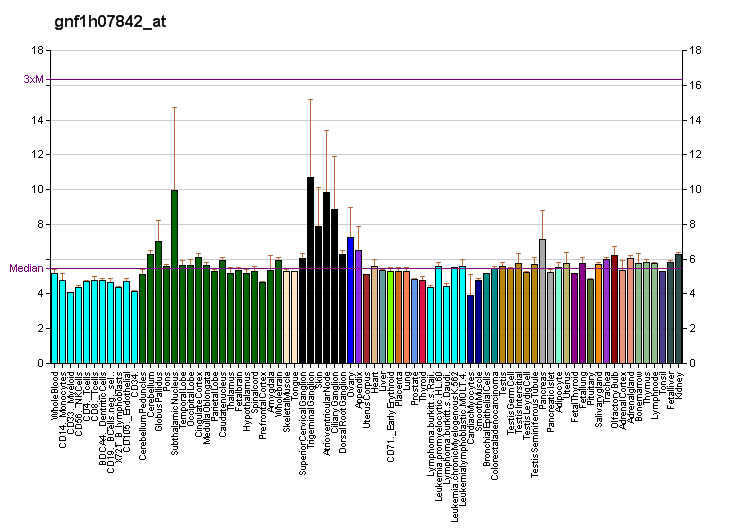
RNA expression pattern
Bgee	Human / Mouse (ortholog); Top expressed in: renal medulla; tibialis anterior muscle; deltoid muscle; pancreatic epithelial cell; metanephros; lower lobe of lung; vastus lateralis muscle; endometrium; human kidney; Skeletal muscle tissue of rectus abdominis / Top expressed in: molar; vestibular membrane of cochlear duct; epithelium of lens; genital tubercle; hand; primitive streak; migratory enteric neural crest cell; vas deferens; corneal epithelium; tail of embryo; More reference expression data
BioGPS	More reference expression data
Gene ontology
Molecular function	metal ion binding
Cellular component	plasma membrane; membrane; basement membrane; integral component of membrane; extracellular exosome
Biological process	multicellular organism development; morphogenesis of an epithelium; inner ear development; development of the heart; cell communication; cell adhesion; eye development; embryonic digit morphogenesis
Sources:Amigo / QuickGO
Orthologs
Species	Human	Mouse
Entrez	341640	242022
Ensembl	ENSG00000150893	ENSMUSG00000037016
UniProt	Q5SZK8	Q6NVD0
RefSeq (mRNA)	NM_207361	NM_172862
RefSeq (protein)	NP_997244	NP_766450
Location (UCSC)	Chr 13: 38.69 – 38.89 Mb	Chr 3: 53.42 – 53.56 Mb
PubMed search
- Wikidata
View/Edit Human	View/Edit Mouse

FRAS1-related extracellular matrix protein 2 is a protein that in humans is encoded by the FREM2 gene.

This gene encodes a membrane protein that belongs to the FRAS1 family. This extracellular matrix protein is thought to be required for maintaining the integrity of the skin epithelium and the differentiated state of renal epithelia. The protein localizes to the basement membrane, forming a ternary complex that plays a role in epidermal-dermal interactions during morphogenetic processes. Mutations in this gene are associated with Fraser syndrome.
