= SS Hilonian =

New Zealand cargo ship

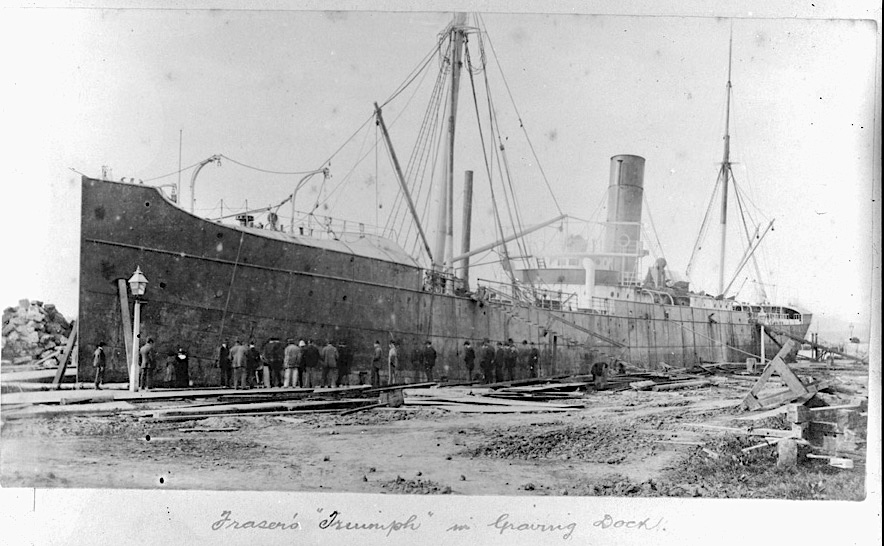
- SS Triumph in dry dock near Prince's Wharf in 1884 after being wrecked on Tiritiri Matangi Island

History
- Name: 1880 Triumph 1888 Gaditano 1906 Hilonian
- Owner: 1880 McIntyre Brothers & Co., Newcastle 1884 Fraser & Tinne, Auckland 1887 Geo. S. Kissling, Auckland 1888 M. M. de Arrótegui, Bilbao 1906 Matson Navigation Co., San Francisco 1917 Pacific Freighters Co.
- Builder: Raylton Dixon & Co., Middlesbrough
- Yard number: 168
- Launched: 23 June 1880
- Identification: 80570
- Fate: Sunk 16 May 1917

General characteristics
- Tonnage: 2,749 GRT
- Length: 340 ft (100 m)
- Beam: 37.3 ft (11.4 m)
- Depth: 27.1 ft (8.3 m)
- Installed power: Steam triple expansion engine, 400 nhp
- Propulsion: One propeller
- Speed: 12 knots (22 km/h)

SS Hilonian was a general passenger and cargo steamer, built as the Triumph in 1880 at Middlesbrough for McIntyre & Co, and later fitted with refrigeration equipment and leased to Shaw Savill and the New Zealand Shipping Company. She sank and ran aground many times, the final sinking being by torpedo in 1917.

Triumph first went to China, where she ran ashore in the Yangtze. After being refloated she returned to England, where she was chartered for the New Zealand trade. On her first voyage south she carried 322 emigrants and steerage passengers from Plymouth to Auckland.

== 1884-1887 ==
After leaving Auckland on 29 November 1883, she ran aground close to a lighthouse, on rocks on an island in the harbour. The Nautical Court concluded that the grounding was due to the quartermaster being given orders to steer with the lighthouse on the port bow, as the captain was feeling tired. In January 1884 George Fraser successfully salvaged Triumph from the shore at Tiritiri Island, having purchased the vessel for £2,100 he had it afloat and in Auckland harbour within weeks. However, Triumph was 40 ft (12 m) too long for the dry dock, which was then near Princes Wharf, so a coffer-dam had to be constructed. Repairs to the steamer required 100 tons of plates and angle irons. This dock was situated near the present Prince's Wharf. After the fore part of the vessel had been repaired she was taken out and placed in stern first for repairs to the keel and twisted rudder post. In 1885 Triumph went to Sydney for a survey, prior to a proposed sale as a troopship during the Russian scare. That fell through, so she resumed trade to India and Britain. During this period she stranded at Bluff, but suffered no damage. Hopes of profits from Triumph faded with a mid 1880s recession, so she was sold in Britain in 1888.

== 1888-1917 ==
In 1888 she sank at the mouth of the Tyne, after colliding with S.S. Rivas, with a cargo of coal, but was refloated, and again, with railway iron on board, she sank in the Clyde. She ran ashore in Norway and was abandoned until again refloated and repaired. Then she was sold to a Spanish firm, being renamed the Gladitano. During the Spanish-American War she sank while anchoring in a Florida port. Yet again Triumph was raised and sold in 1910 to the Matson Navigation Company, to run between Honolulu and San Francisco as the Hilonian, converted as an oil-burner. In 1917 she was sold to Pacific Freighters Co. A German submarine finally sank her in 1917, when in use as a troopship.
