= George Fraser (footballer) =

Scottish footballer and manager

Personal information
- Full name: George Fraser
- Date of birth: 1881
- Place of birth: Elgin, Moray, Scotland
- Date of death: 21 October 1951 (aged 69–70)
- Position: Right half

Senior career*
Years	Team	Apps	(Gls)
–	Elgin City		
1899–1901	Sunderland	0	(0)
1901–1911	Lincoln City (Note: Lincoln City infobox statistics are for the Football League only. They do not include appearances and goals in the 1908–09 Midland League season.)	265	(4)
–	Nettleham		

Managerial career
- 1919–1921: Lincoln City
- 1921–1924: Grimsby Town
- * Club domestic league appearances and goals

George Fraser (1881 (Note: The Lincoln City FC Archive lists his year of birth as 1881, while Joyce's Football League Players' Records and the Sunderland A.F.C.-related statistical website TheStatCat give 1874.) – 21 October 1951) was a Scottish footballer who made 265 appearances in the Football League for Lincoln City. He played at right half. He played for his local club, Elgin City, before moving to England to join Sunderland in 1889, but never represented them in senior competition, and signed for Second Division club Lincoln City in 1901. He spent ten years with Lincoln, making 330 appearances in all competitions, and contributed to their Midland League title in 1908–09.

Fraser managed Lincoln City from 1919 to 1921, and took charge of Grimsby Town from 1921 to 1924, a post he resigned because he felt the club's directors were interfering in his team selections.
