= GRIP2 =

Protein-coding gene in the species Homo sapiens

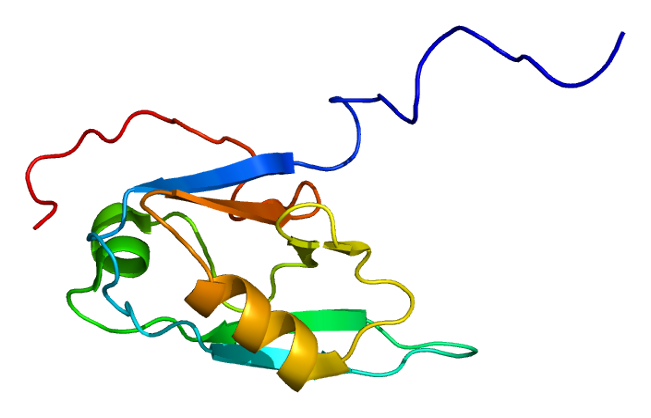

Identifiers
- Aliases: GRIP2, glutamate receptor interacting protein 2
- External IDs: MGI: 2681173; GeneCards: GRIP2
Available structures
PDB	Human UniProt search: PDBe RCSB
PDB	List of PDB id codes 1V62, 1X5R

Gene location (Mouse)
Chr.	Chromosome 6 (mouse)
Band	6|6 D1	Start	91,738,490 bp
Band	6|6 D1	End	91,804,231 bp
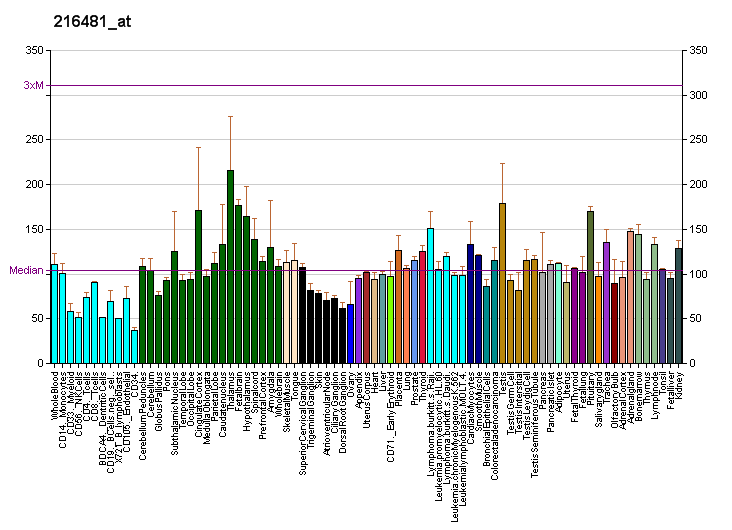
RNA expression pattern
Bgee	Human / Mouse (ortholog); Top expressed in: body of tongue; left ventricle; gastrocnemius muscle; thoracic diaphragm; triceps brachii muscle; vastus lateralis muscle; ventral tegmental area; cardia; right ventricle; subthalamic nucleus / Top expressed in: aortic valve; ascending aorta; substantia nigra; ventral tegmental area; lumbar subsegment of spinal cord; habenula; dorsal tegmental nucleus; superior colliculus; decidua; olfactory bulb; More reference expression data
BioGPS	More reference expression data
Gene ontology
Molecular function	signaling receptor complex adaptor activity
Cellular component	cytoplasm; cytosol; plasma membrane; membrane; postsynaptic density; dendrite; postsynaptic membrane; glutamatergic synapse
Biological process	Notch signaling pathway; positive regulation of signal transduction; artery smooth muscle contraction; protein transport; positive regulation of blood pressure; neurotransmitter receptor transport, endosome to postsynaptic membrane; vesicle-mediated transport in synapse
Sources:Amigo / QuickGO
Orthologs
Databases	NCBI: entry
Species	Human	Mouse
Entrez	80852	243547
Ensembl	n/a	ENSMUSG00000030098
UniProt	Q9C0E4	n/a
RefSeq (mRNA)	NM_001080423	NM_001033353; NM_001159507
RefSeq (protein)	NP_001073892	n/a
Location (UCSC)	n/a	Chr 6: 91.74 – 91.8 Mb
PubMed search
- Wikidata
View/Edit Human	View/Edit Mouse

Glutamate receptor-interacting protein 2 is a protein that in humans is encoded by the GRIP2 gene.

== Interactions ==
GRIP2 has been shown to interact with liprin-alpha-1.
