= George R. Fraser =

British medical geneticist (1932–2020)

George Robert Fraser (3 March 1932 – 1 April 2020) was a British medical geneticist. In 1962, he described the condition later known as Fraser syndrome. He died on 1 April 2020, aged 88.
