= George Frazier (author) =

American author

George Frazier is an American author who writes about the natural landscapes and wild places of the Great Plains and the Midwest. He is also a computer scientist and academic, serving as an assistant professor of Computer Information Sciences at Washburn University. Frazier is the author of The Last Wild Places of Kansas and Riverine Dreams: Away to the Glorious and Forgotten Grassland Rivers of America. Each book examines regional environments through natural history, conservation and place-based narrative.

== Writing career ==
Frazier's writing centers on the ecology, history and cultural significance of landscapes in the Great Plains and the Midwest, in particular rivers, prairies, and lesser-known natural areas. His work often addresses themes of land use, environmental change and conservation. Frazier has cited the destruction of the Elkins Prairie in eastern Kansas as a catalyst in his decision to write about Midwestern landscapes, describing the event as the moment he came to see the importance of wild places in the region. In a documentary produced by the Kansas Land Trust, he reflects on the 70 acre prairie's loss and its influence on his environmental writing. Frazier also wrote "Niobrara River Dreams," which appeared in the fall 2025 issue of National Parks Magazine. The Last Wild Places of Kansas was designated a Kansas Notable Book, an annual recognition highlighting significant works by Kansas authors or about the state. Riverine Dreams received the distinction in 2026.

== Reviews and Interviews ==
- Reviews of Riverine Dreams have appeared in Library Journal, Foreword Reviews and Issues in Science and Technology
- Since the publication of Riverine Dreams, Frazier has been interviewed by Foreword Reviews and EcoRadio KC (KKFI, Kansas City Community Radio).
- The Last Wild Places in Kansas was a featured book in Kansas Reflector.
- The Last Wild Places in Kansas was reviewed on Kansas Public Radio as well as the Wichita Eagle. "The Last Wild Places in Kansas takes readers, with great writing, to places many never knew existed."
