= George Fraser (rugby union) =

England international rugby union player

- Full name: George William Frederick Fraser
- Born: 15 September 1877 Fulham, London, England
- Died: 20 August 1950 (aged 72) Clewer Within, Berkshire, England

Rugby union career
- Position: Forward
International career
Years	Team	Apps	(Points)
1902–03	England	5	(0)

George William Frederick Fraser (15 September 1877 – 20 August 1950) was an English international rugby union player of the early 20th century.

Strongly–built, Fraser was a hard tackling forward with London club Richmond and had his breakthrough in 1899 when he first gained Middlesex representative honours. He was a member of the England pack in 1902 and 1903, gaining a total of five caps. In addition to rugby, Fraser was also noted as an oarsman.

Fraser served in World War I as an officer in the Royal Naval Volunteer Reserve.

== See also ==
- List of England national rugby union players
