= Rotomahana (barque) =

British ship

History

United Kingdom
- Name: SS Rotomahana
- Launched: 1881
- Fate: Burnt out and wrecked

General characteristics
- Tonnage: 1,658 GRT
- Length: 248 ft (76 m)
- Beam: 38 ft (12 m)
- Depth: 22 ft 9 in (6.93 m)
- Complement: Accommodation for 50 crew; regularly sailed with 23 hands.

Rotomahana was a British steel-hulled, four-masted barque. It was constructed in 1881 and it was wrecked in 1884.

== Construction ==
Rotomahana was built for James R DeWolf of 28 Brunswick Street, Liverpool at the yard of Messrs Russell & Co, Cartsdyke, Greenock. It was launched on Tuesday 28 June 1881. James R DeWolf was a descendant of James DeWolf, a slave trader and privateer.

== Name and other ships ==
Rotomahana was a name used by at least two other ships of the era. Rotomahana and its Pink and White Terraces had become better known after the Duke of Edinburgh visited in 1870. Rotomahana was the name of the first iron ship built in Auckland in 1876 and beached in 1924 and another, launched at Denny shipyard for Union Steamship in 1879 and scrapped in 1926.

== Service ==
Rotomahana was recorded as arriving at Dundee on 19 April 1883.

On 19 May it sailed from Dundee under the command of John W Mance. Its crew agreement bound participants to a trip to Cardiff, Wales, and on to Wilmington, California "and/or any ports in places not exceeding 75 degrees north and 65 degrees south latitudes, trading to and fro, within these limits as required, for a period not exceeding three years and back to a final port of discharge in the United Kingdom or on the continent of Europe between the Elbe and Brest, with power to call at any place for orders".

The crew were aged between 19 and 43 with birthplaces ranging from the UK to Sweden, Italy, Holland, the West Indies, and Sicily. Wages ranged from £5 5s a month for George Unwin of Liverpool, the sailmaker, to £3 5s for the 20 able-bodied seamen. Unwin's wage of £17 02 5d was paid on discharge. Fifteen of the ABs deserted the ship in San Francisco.

The agreement also listed the food the crew could expect, which included 1lb of bread a day 1 1/2 lb (0.68 kg) of beef and 1 1/4 lb (0.57 kg) of pork on alternate days, 1/2 lb (0.23 kg) of flour and 1/3 lb (0.15 kg) of peas on alternate days. The men would also receive a daily ration of 1/8 oz (3.5 g) of tea, 1/2 oz (14 g) of coffee, 2 oz (57 g) of sugar and 3 imp qt (3,400 ml; 120 US fl oz) of water, as well as the statutory lime and lemon juice and sugar. "Equivalent substitutes as may be found necessary."

Rotomahana arrived back in Liverpool on 16 May 1884. One death was recorded but no name given.

== Final voyage ==
Rotomahana set sail from Liverpool, bound for San Francisco, US in the summer of 1884 with a cargo of coal. Two months into the trip, the coal was found to be ablaze. It was said that the ship's compasses were so affected by heat that they were "perfectly untrustworthy". The result was that Rotomahana ran ashore at Elephant Keys, in the northwest of East Falkland, on 20 August 1884.

The Rotomahana crew reached Port Stanley on 10 September 1884 and the ship's fate was recorded in "Maritime Losses" in The Times on 26 September 1884 There was at least one fatality. Sailmaker George Unwin of Liverpool subsequently died in Montevideo, Uruguay, on 14 November.

== Legacy ==
In November 1884 a Board of Trade inquiry was held into the loss of both Rotomahana and Earl of Beaconsfield, a slightly larger vessel that had carried coal and general cargo. The Earl of Beaconsfield fire was blamed on spontaneous combustion. The inquiry ruled that the ordinary precautions for the safety of carrying coal cargoes were insufficient. It noted that the fire on Earl of Beaconsfield remained hidden until it was too late to fight in properly and said it was "very significant" that many of the ships that went missing were carrying coal. The board called for all coal-carrying ships to be fitted with a system of tubes to be inserted at different points in the cargo to assess temperature.
