= SS Rotomahana (1876) =

Australian steamship

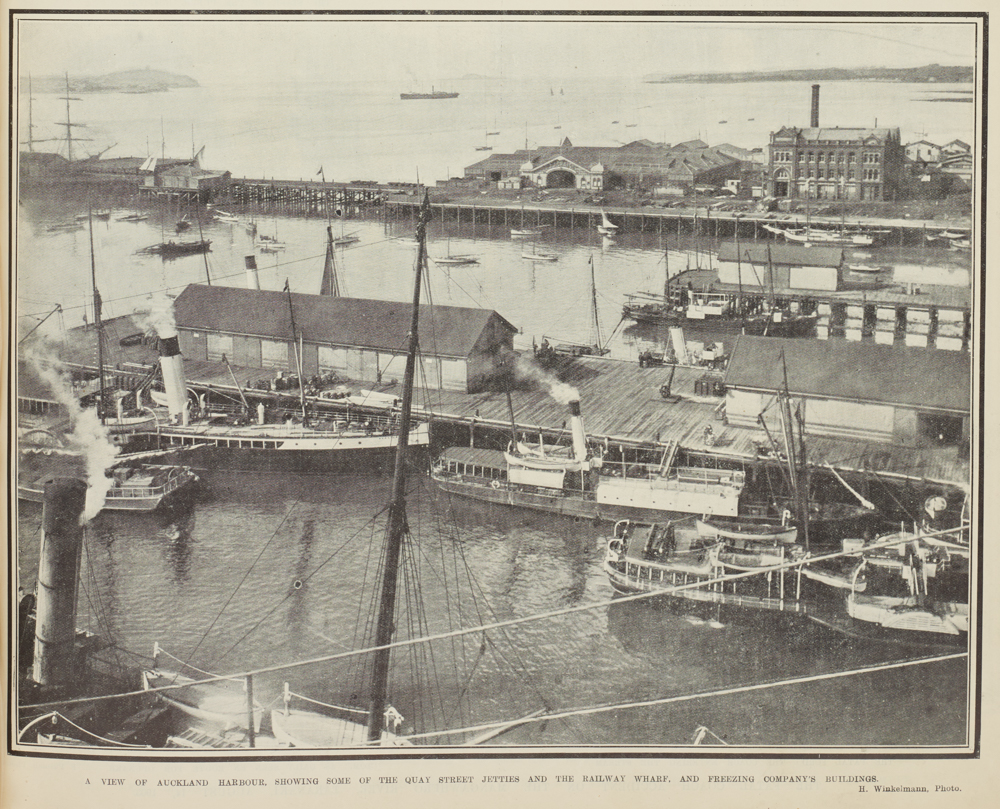
- Rotomahana (centre right) at Auckland in 1903

History

New Zealand
- Builder: Fraser & Tinne, Auckland
- Launched: 20 November 1876
- Decommissioned: 1921
- Out of service: October 1914
- Home port: Auckland
- Identification: 75119
- Fate: Beached on 17 June 1924

General characteristics
- Tonnage: 183 tons
- Length: 127 ft (39 m)
- Beam: 17 ft 6 in (5.33 m)
- Height: mainmast 65 ft (20 m)
- Draught: 7 ft 6 in (2.29 m)
- Depth: 6 ft 7 in (2.01 m)
- Depth of hold: 7 ft 6 in (2.29 m)
- Deck clearance: 7 ft (2.1 m)
- Propulsion: Single-screw steamer, 50 nominal horsepower jet condensing steam engine
- Sail plan: 3-masted fore-and-aft schooner
- Speed: 10 knots (19 km/h; 12 mph)
- Boats & landing craft carried: one lifeboat, one cargo boat
- Capacity: 66 passengers

SS Rotomahana was an 1876 harbour steamer and the first iron vessel to be built in Auckland, though launched only 28 minutes ahead of another, though smaller, iron ship. Rotomahana was a name used by at least two other ships of the era, presumably because Rotomahana and its Pink and White Terraces had become better known after the Duke of Edinburgh visited in 1870.

Until 1888 Rotomahana worked for her builders, Fraser & Tinne, flying their yellow house-flag with a phoenix and taking a bit over 4 hours to ply the 50 mi (80 km) Auckland–Thames route. Theodore Tinne left the partnership in 1882, leaving the firm in the sole ownership of George Fraser. In the later 1880s George faced increasing financial pressures.

Rotomahana was one of the assets he sold. She was bought by M.T. Clayton of Auckland in 1888 and, from 1888 to 1890, was run by New Zealand Insurance Co. They sold her to Captain Worsp on 3 April 1890 for £2,225, but he had sold her to Northern Steamship Co by 12 July 1890. Rotomahana continued serving Thames until June 1898, when she was replaced by the larger and faster Wakatere and she switched to the Coromandel run. Occasionally she served other Hauraki Gulf Northern Steamship routes, such as Port Fitzroy, Okupu and Tryphena on Great Barrier Island.

After overheating, she was re-engined by Fraser & Tinne in 1879. In another major refit in 1891 her boiler was moved forward, its pressure increased, extra compound cylinders added and her masts reduced from 3 to 2.

Apart from regular maintenance and the major rebuilds, the only event out of the ordinary occurred on 28 May 1911, a day when the Auckland-Devonport ferry got lost, and Rotomahana ran aground near Motuihe Island in heavy fog. However, she refloated on the rising tide and suffered no damage.

Rotomahana's last day of service seems to have been 28 October 1914, as she was shortly after given a survey and then laid up. She was later used for oil storage, until being dismantled and then sold to McCallum Bros, who beached her on Pakihi Island in 1924, for use as a wharf. Remains of her hull were still visible in 1999.

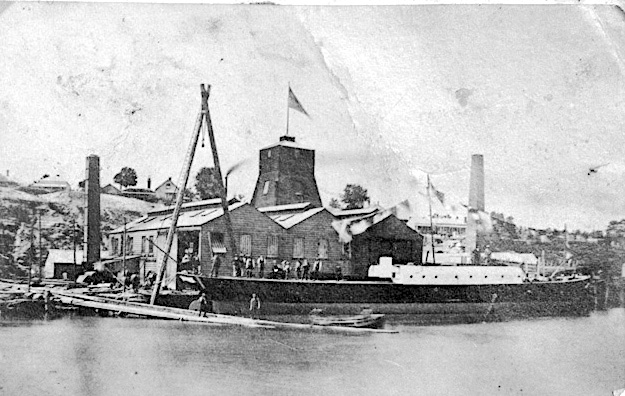
SS Rotomahana being fitted out at the 1874 Fraser and Tinne foundry, Mechanics Bay in 1876

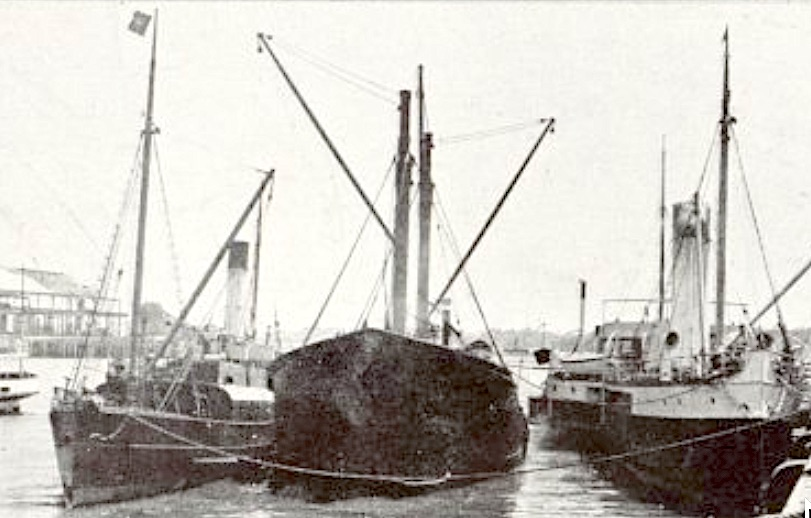
Rotomahana (left) in 1913 loading coal at Auckland
