= PS Governor Wynyard =

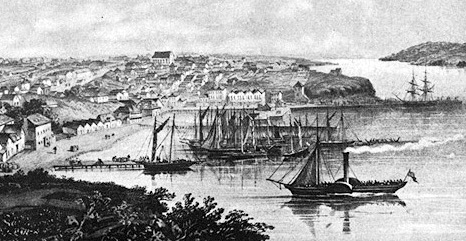
- PS Governor Wynyard entering Commercial Bay, Auckland in 1852

History

New Zealand
- Name: Governor Wynyard
- Namesake: Robert Wynyard
- Builder: William Bourne, Auckland
- Launched: 24 December 1851
- Maiden voyage: 10 January 1852
- Stricken: 20 July 1873
- Homeport: Auckland
- Identification: 32202
- Fate: Sprang a leak and was beached

General characteristics
- Type: schooner
- Tonnage: 43 tons
- Length: keel 49 ft (15 m), overall 60 ft (18 m)
- Beam: 13 ft 6 in (4.11 m)
- Draught: 2 ft 6 in (0.76 m)
- Depth of hold: 6 ft (1.8 m)
- Propulsion: paddle wheels driven by 2 x 5 horsepower vertical steam engines
- Speed: 8 kn (15 km/h; 9.2 mph)

PS Governor Wynyard, was a small steam ship, the first to be built in New Zealand, and was launched in 1851. She was a paddle steamer schooner, built of pohutukawa, with kauri planks. In 1853, she ended her service on the Tamaki River in Auckland and was sold in Melbourne in 1852 during the gold rush. Soon after, she started functioning as a ferry in Tasmania, where her basic engines were removed in 1858. She sprang a leak and became a beached wreck in 1873.

She was built at Stone & Lanford's Freemans Bay yard for the builder's brother, C. J. Stone, and his partners, F. Gardiner, and Captain A. Cook. The ship was launched sideways on 24 December 1851. Her two steeple engines were fed by a double tubed Lancashire boiler, built by William Bourne's foundry. The foundry tools were rudimentary and work was delayed until an American boilermaker, Mr. Brown, arrived. He had no shears, rollers, or punching machine, but made a clay mould to bend the plates and had the holes manually punched in the boiler.

The vessel was towed to Wynyard pier, where the Mayor named her. An anonymous letter to the New Zealander had said she was to be named after the Governor. A 1909 account said no name had been chosen, but that the governor was very pleased, so the name Governor Wynyard was chosen.

Governor Wynyard made a trial trip on the Tamaki River on 10 January 1852, with one of her owners, Captain Cook, Mr. Brown being engineer. Due to his inexperience the boiler primed and he opened the safety valve, but drained too much water, so that the fire had to be damped down and water added with a bucket. After the initial delay she reached 8 knots. Her exhaust steam blew into her paddle-boxes, making an explosion on every piston stroke. A contemporary report said, "she makes full as much noise as speed".

For her first 6 months she ran on the Tamaki River to Panmure and Ōtāhuhu, where some roads were not fit for carts, but settlers were reported to be annoyed if she didn't wait for goods beyond departure time. She then made a trial trip to Bay of Islands. A later source said there was insufficient trade on the Tamaki. In 1853 her paddle-boxes were removed and she sailed across the Tasman Sea to Melbourne, where she arrived on 26 August, worked on a ferry to Williamstown and was sold by her builder on 28 December 1852 for £2,300. Several later accounts said she worked on the Yarra for many years, earning up to £60 a day. However they are probably not true, as she started a Tamar River ferry service between Launceston and George Town in February 1854, owned by Benjamin Hyrons. She collided with the steamer Royal Shepherd in the Tamar in 1855, but was still on the George Town service in 1857, having had a major overhaul. Her engines were removed in 1858, leaving her as a sailing schooner. In 1899 it was said her engines had been transferred to her replacement on the ferry service, Tamar Maid.

On Sunday 20 July 1873, during a voyage from Duck River to Launceston, Governor Wynyard sprang a leak and was beached as a wreck at Stanley.
