= George Fraser (New Zealand engineer) =

New Zealand engineer, foundry proprietor, and ship owner

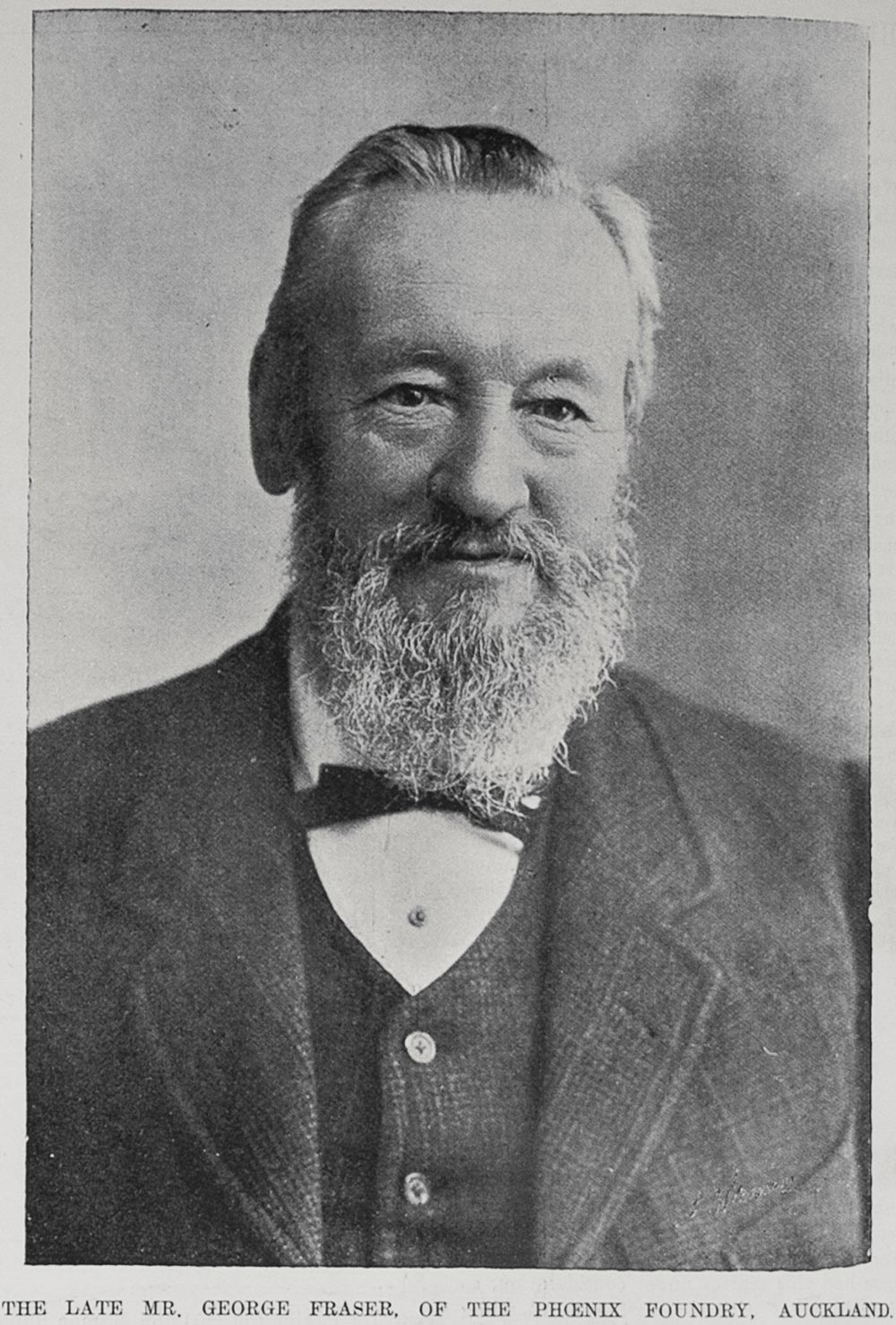
Fraser in 1901

George Fraser (28 June 1832 – 29 July 1901) was a New Zealand engineer, foundry proprietor and ship owner. He was born in Aberdeen, Aberdeenshire, Scotland on 28 June 1832.

== Early life ==
George Fraser, was born at Fort Dee, or Footdee, in Aberdeen, on 25 June, or possibly 28 June 1832, the son of Rachel Gray and her husband, George Fraser, an iron moulder at Simpson's Engineering Works. He went to a local school, until apprenticed, aged 14, to local engineers and shipbuilders, Hall, Catto, Thompson & Co. His next job was draughtsman at Smith and Tulloch, engineers of Greenock, then briefly, aged 20, as manager of the Caulton Foundry in Glasgow. He then spent seven years as an apprentice at Simpson's in the drawing office and learning machining, fitting and pattern making. On 8 October 1854, near Glasgow, he married Christina Davidson, daughter of the manager at Simpson's. Then he was a pattern-maker at St. Rollox Foundry, a draughtsman with Clydebank Foundry and manager of the Carlton Foundry of Drummond and Co.

== Move to New Zealand ==
His next job, for Campbellfield engineers Hopkins and Wilson, was to help erect and manage 4 flax mills at Matakana in New Zealand. After a voyage of 145 days, he and the machinery arrived in Auckland on 28, or 30 April 1855 on the barque Cornubia. However, the mill rendered the fibre useless, so George returned to Auckland in 1856 to build a large flour mill in Queen Street for Thornton, Smith and Firth.

== Phoenix foundry ==
In 1861 George bought a foundry in Parnell and in 1864 moved it further up Grafton Gully as the Phoenix Foundry, initially as Fraser and Tinne and later as George Fraser & Sons Ltd. George's restoration of the wrecked ship Triumph was well publicised and awarded around 1884.

== Flax ==
In 1871 Fraser and Tinne acquired a flax mill at Kaihu, which, in 1875, they converted to produce paper and cardboard from flax. The venture was financed from Liverpool by setting up the New Zealand Fibre Company. These assets seem to have been sold in 1885.

== Family ==
Christina and George had 7 sons and 3 daughters. Other family members involved with Phoenix included Samuel Edgar Fraser (−1923), George Fraser (1856–1933), Theodore Tinne Fraser (1869–1936), Joseph Fraser (−1937) and John Ernest Fraser (1875–1944). His second son, Alexander Davidson Fraser, was manager for the Union Steam Ship Co at Gisborne. From 1864 they lived at 36 Wynyard Street, overlooking the Phoenix Foundry in the gully below. George's great grandson, George (V), was born and lived there from 1926 to 1936. The house was replaced by a carpark in 1963.

== Later life ==
George Fraser was a member of Auckland Technical School committee from its inception in 1895 and served briefly on Auckland Harbour Board from 1873 to 1874, but found the conflict with his contracts for the Board, too great to continue. George died at his Wynyard St home on 29 July 1901, shortly after his wife, Christina, who died on 15 February 1901. He was buried at Purewa Cemetery.
