= FRAS1 =

Protein-coding gene in the species Homo sapiens

Identifiers
- Aliases: FRAS1, Fraser extracellular matrix complex subunit 1, FRASRS1
- External IDs: OMIM: 607830; MGI: 2385368; HomoloGene: 23516; GeneCards: FRAS1; OMA:FRAS1 - orthologs

Gene location (Human)
Chr.	Chromosome 4 (human)
Band	4q21.21	Start	78,057,323 bp
Band	4q21.21	End	78,544,269 bp

Gene location (Mouse)
Chr.	Chromosome 5 (mouse)
Band	5|5 E3	Start	96,521,814 bp
Band	5|5 E3	End	96,932,587 bp
RNA expression pattern
Bgee	Human / Mouse (ortholog); Top expressed in: germinal epithelium; parietal pleura; renal medulla; Brodmann area 23; visceral pleura; middle temporal gyrus; lateral nuclear group of thalamus; epithelium of colon; placenta; biceps brachii / Top expressed in: fourth ventricle; choroid plexus of fourth ventricle; molar; squamous epithelium; hand; choroidal fissure; mesothelium; pericardium; atrium; mesothelium of peritoneum; More reference expression data
BioGPS	n/a
Gene ontology
Molecular function	metal ion binding; extracellular matrix structural constituent
Cellular component	plasma membrane; extracellular matrix; membrane; basement membrane; integral component of membrane; collagen-containing extracellular matrix
Biological process	skin development; embryonic limb morphogenesis; protein transport; metanephros morphogenesis; morphogenesis of an epithelium; roof of mouth development; cell communication
Sources:Amigo / QuickGO
Orthologs
Species	Human	Mouse
Entrez	80144	231470
Ensembl	ENSG00000138759	ENSMUSG00000034687
UniProt	Q86XX4	Q80T14
RefSeq (mRNA)	NM_001166133; NM_020875; NM_025074; NM_032863; NM_206841	NM_175473
RefSeq (protein)	NP_001159605; NP_079350	NP_780682
Location (UCSC)	Chr 4: 78.06 – 78.54 Mb	Chr 5: 96.52 – 96.93 Mb
PubMed search
- Wikidata
View/Edit Human	View/Edit Mouse

Extracellular matrix protein FRAS1 is a protein that in humans is encoded by the FRAS1 (Fraser syndrome 1) gene. This gene encodes an extracellular matrix protein that appears to function in the regulation of epidermal-basement membrane adhesion and organogenesis during development.

== Metastatic prostate cancer ==
A single nucleotide switch (polymorphism) in FRAS1 promoter region is associated with metastatic Prostate cancer. The promoter region is directly related to the NFkB pathway and has been shown to be associated with lethal prostate cancer.

Fras1 related extracellular matrix (FREM1) directly relates to congenital diaphragmatic hernia in developing fetuses. Decreased expression of FREM1 may be linked with disruptions in the growth of diaphragm cells. Both FRAS1 and FREM1 are among the proteins that are primarily interacting during embryonic development. It is shown that a decrease in these two proteins lead to an increase of congenital diaphragmatic hernia in both humans and mice.

== Clinical significance ==
Mutations in this gene have been observed to cause fraser syndrome.

== See also ==
- Fraser syndrome
