= HMS Armada (1810) =

Vengeur-class ship of the line

- Armada

History

United Kingdom
- Name: Armada
- Ordered: 20 October 1806
- Builder: Isaac Blackburn, Turnchapel
- Laid down: February 1807
- Launched: 22 March 1810
- Commissioned: August 1810
- Fate: Sold, 1863

General characteristics (as built)
- Class & type: Vengeur-class ship of the line
- Tons burthen: 1,749 34/94 (bm)
- Length: 176 ft (53.6 m) (gundeck)
- Beam: 47 ft 7 in (14.5 m)
- Draught: 17 ft 9 in (5.4 m) (light)
- Depth of hold: 21 ft (6.4 m)
- Sail plan: Full-rigged ship
- Complement: 590
- Armament: 74 muzzle-loading, smoothbore guns; Gundeck: 28 × 32 pdr guns; Upper deck: 28 × 18 pdr guns; Quarterdeck: 4 × 12 pdr guns + 10 × 32 pdr carronades; Forecastle: 2 × 12 pdr guns + 2 × 32 pdr carronades

HMS Armada was a 74-gun third rate Vengeur-class ship of the line built for the Royal Navy in the first decade of the 19th century. Completed in 1810, she played a minor role in the Napoleonic Wars. She was the first ship to carry the name. After a relatively undistinguished career, Armada was sold out of the Navy in 1863 and broken up at Marshall's ship breaking yard in Plymouth.

== Service ==
Mrs Pridham, the wife of the Mayor of Plymouth, Mr Joseph Pridham, launched Armada on 23 March 1810. Captain Adam Mackenzie commissioned her for the Texel.

On 9 November 1810, Armada was among the vessels in sight when the 36-gun fifth rate Curacoa captured the French privateer Venus. Then on 22 November, Armada was in the company of the 74-gun Northumberland when Northumberland captured the 14-gun French privateer ketch Glaneuse of Saint Maloes, which was under the command of a Dane, Mr. Anthe Haste. Glaneuse was only six months old and was six weeks into her first cruise, having made no captures. (Note: An able seaman's share of the prize money was 14s 3 3/4d.)

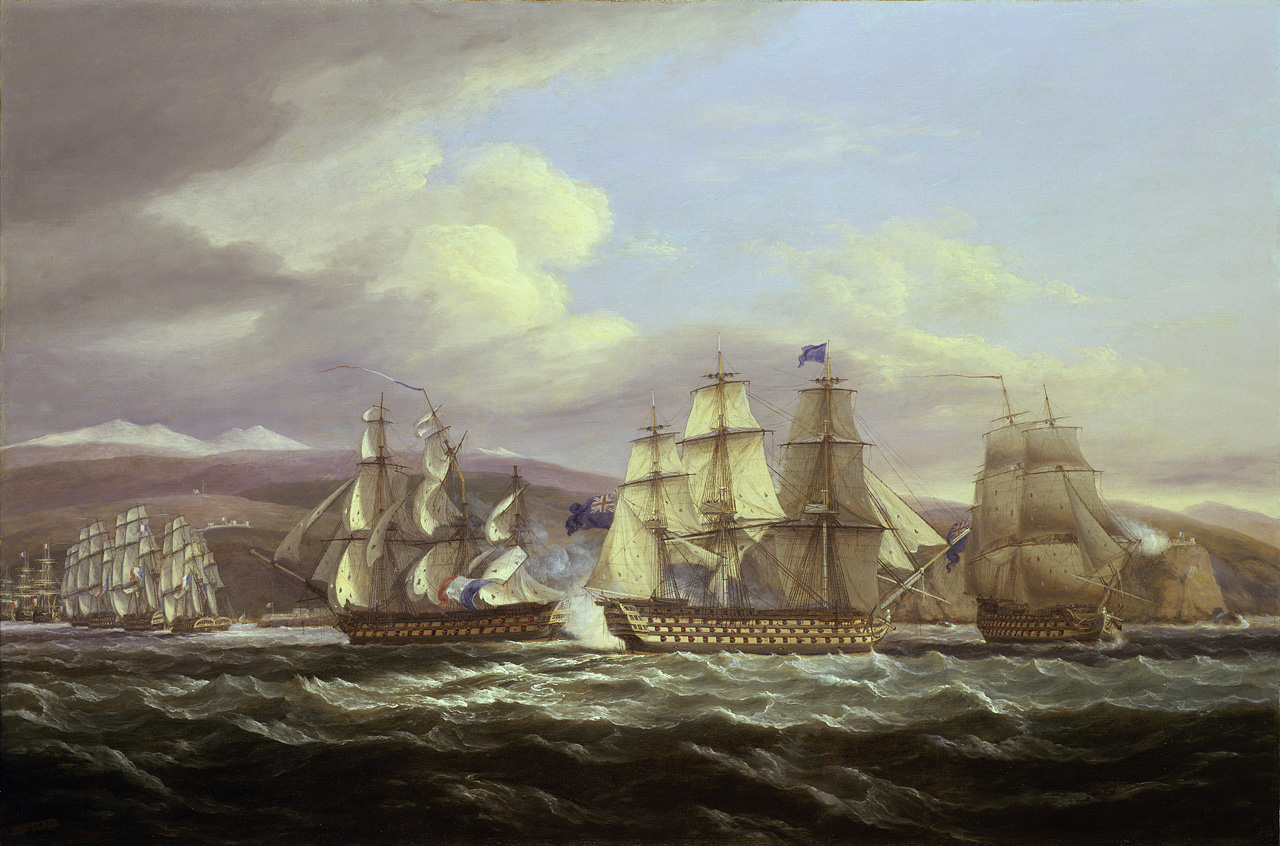
Blockade of Toulon, 1810-1814: Pellew's action, 5 November 1813, by Thomas Luny

On 1 February 1811 Armada was one of a number of vessels that were in company when Hero captured the American schooner Beauty.

In January 1812 Captain R.F. Devonshire briefly took command. That same month Captain Charles Grant replaced him.

On 23 July 1813, the seas pushed Armada into range of French batteries at Borgidhero. The batteries opened fire but the shots went over Armada. Armada landed her marines who captured the eastern battery and then entered the battery on the point of Borgidhero after the French had tried to blow it up. The marines spiked the guns. The landing party took fire from the nearby town so the frigates accompanying Armada fired on the town while the landing party burnt some vessels on the shore. Armada suffered two men wounded in the engagement.

On 4 November 1813 Armada arrived off Cap Sicié and the next day was involved in a skirmish with a French squadron off Toulon. Admiral Sir Edward Pellew's inshore squadron consisted of the 74-gun third rates Scipion, Mulgrave, Pembroke, and Armada, Captains Henry Heathcote, Thomas James Maling, James Brisbane, and Charles Grant. The 74-gun third-rate Pompee, Captain Sir James Athol Wood, joined them. These vessels opened fire on the French fleet consisting of 14 sail of the line and seven frigates, which had sortied from Toulon on a training exercise. Pellew and the main body of his force soon arrived to join the fray. Neither side accomplished much as the French rapidly returned to port. Armada had no casualties though one shot did hit her, and in all the British suffered 12 men wounded by enemy fire and one man killed and two wounded in an accident. Pellew mentioned in his letter that the only reason he had reported the incident was to provide an accurate account to counteract French propaganda. The French suffered 17 wounded.

On 9 December Armada was with a squadron under Captain Josiah Rowley of America and assisted in supporting the landing of troops at Via Reggio. Armada had met up with the squadron, which had sailed up from Palermo, off Corsica a few days earlier. The troops, 1000 men of the Italian Levy under the command of Lieut-Colonel Catanelli, marched inland and captured Lucca. They then returned to Via Reggio. There was further fighting around Pisa and Via Reggio before the expedition re-embarked aboard the British warships.

In November and December Berwick and Euryalus made a number of captures. Armada shared in the prize money by agreement with Berwick. Armada benefited from the capture of the St Anne and two French ships taken on 13 and 16 November, the schooner Air taken on 11 December, and the Antoine Camille and Resurrection taken on 17 December. (Note: The prize money was denominated in "Dollars", "R." and "Dbles.", with Grant receiving over 2205 dollars. An ordinary seaman received over 10 dollars.)

On 12 February 1814 Armada was a part of the fleet off Toulon that chased a French squadron into that port. Armada herself did not take part in any action.

On 23 April, Armada and Curacoa, together with 12 Sicilian gunboats, arrived at Savona to support a British and Sicilian force besieging the fortress there. When the French commander declined to surrender, the British warships, the gunboats and a battery commenced a cannonade. After an hour the French capitulated. Under the terms of surrender they were permitted to march out and return to Italy. The British and Sicilian force captured 110 cannon.

On 1 September Armada was escorting ten merchant vessels to Gibraltar. Some 200 miles west of Ushant, the convoy encountered the sloop USS Wasp, which was operating out of Lorient. Wasp made for the convoy and singled out the brig Mary, laden with iron and brass cannon and other military stores, which she quickly captured, carrying off Mary's crew as prisoners before burning her. Wasp then attempted to take another ship in the convoy, but Armada was able to chase her off.

== Fate ==
By 1815 Armada was out of commission at Plymouth, and remained so for the rest of her life. The Admiralty used her as a powder hulk at Keyham Point from April 1844. An Admiralty order in 1862 mandated that her sister ship Conquestador would replace her. Armada was sold out of the Navy in 1863 and broken up at Marshall's ship breaking yard in Plymouth.
