= HMS Benbow (1813) =

Vengeur-class ship of the line

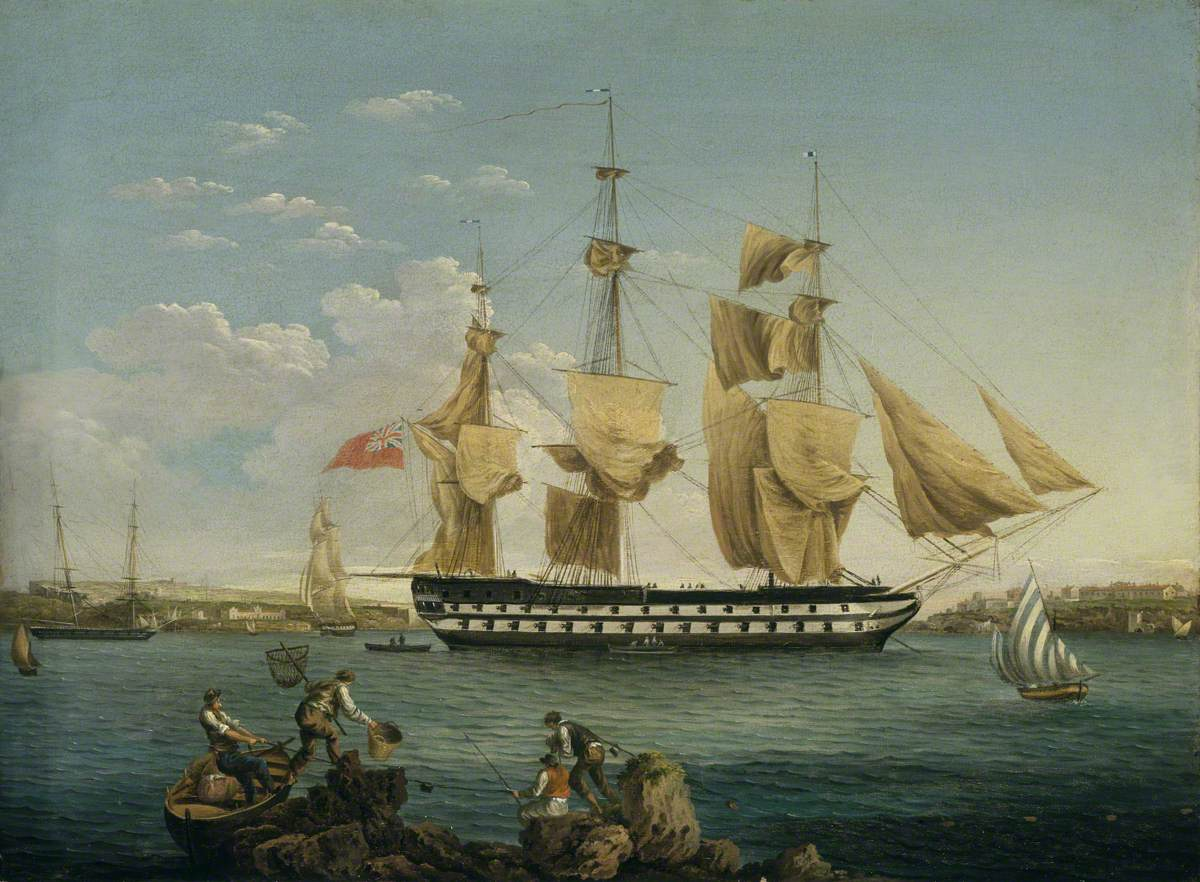
- Benbow's sister ship HMS Duncan

History

United Kingdom
- Name: Benbow
- Ordered: 11 June 1808
- Builder: Samuel & Daniel Brent, Rotherhithe
- Laid down: July 1808
- Launched: 3 February 1813
- Commissioned: April 1813
- Decommissioned: May 1842
- Reclassified: As a barracks ship, February 1848; As a prison ship, September 1854; As a coal hulk, August 1859
- Fate: Sold for scrap, 23 November 1892

General characteristics (as built)
- Class & type: Vengeur-class ship of the line
- Tons burthen: 1,772 72/94 (bm)
- Length: 176 ft 3 in (53.7 m) (gundeck)
- Beam: 47 ft 11 in (14.6 m)
- Draught: 17 ft 3 in (5.3 m) (light)
- Depth of hold: 21 ft (6.4 m)
- Sail plan: Full-rigged ship
- Complement: 590
- Armament: 74 muzzle-loading, smoothbore guns; Gundeck: 28 × 32 pdr guns; Upper deck: 28 × 18 pdr guns; Quarterdeck: 4 × 12 pdr guns + 10 × 32 pdr carronades; Forecastle: 2 × 12 pdr guns + 2 × 32 pdr carronades

HMS Benbow was a 74-gun third rate Vengeur-class ship of the line built for the Royal Navy in the 1810s. Completed in 1813, she played a minor role in the Napoleonic Wars.

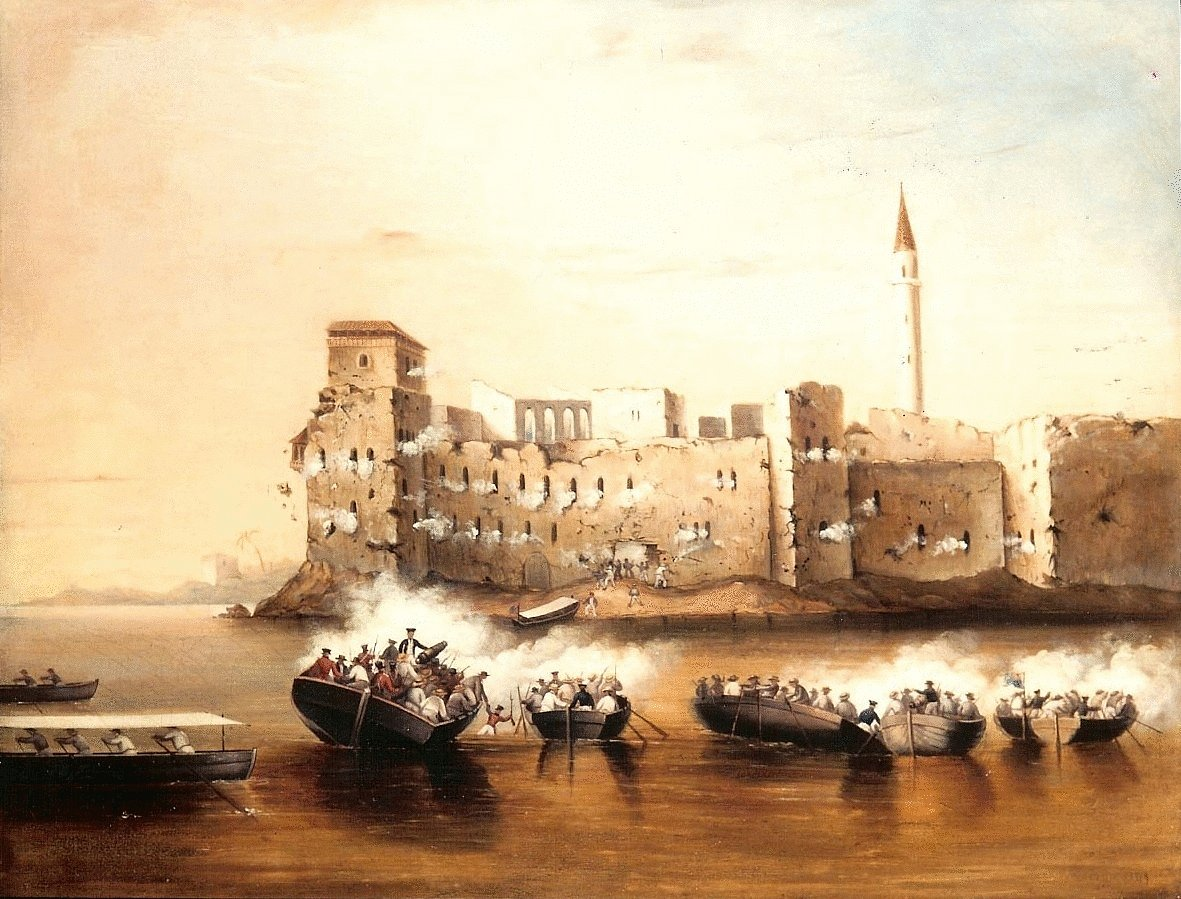
Tortosa, 23rd September 1840, attack by the boats of HMS Benbow, Carysfort and Zebra, under Captain J.F. Ross, R.N.

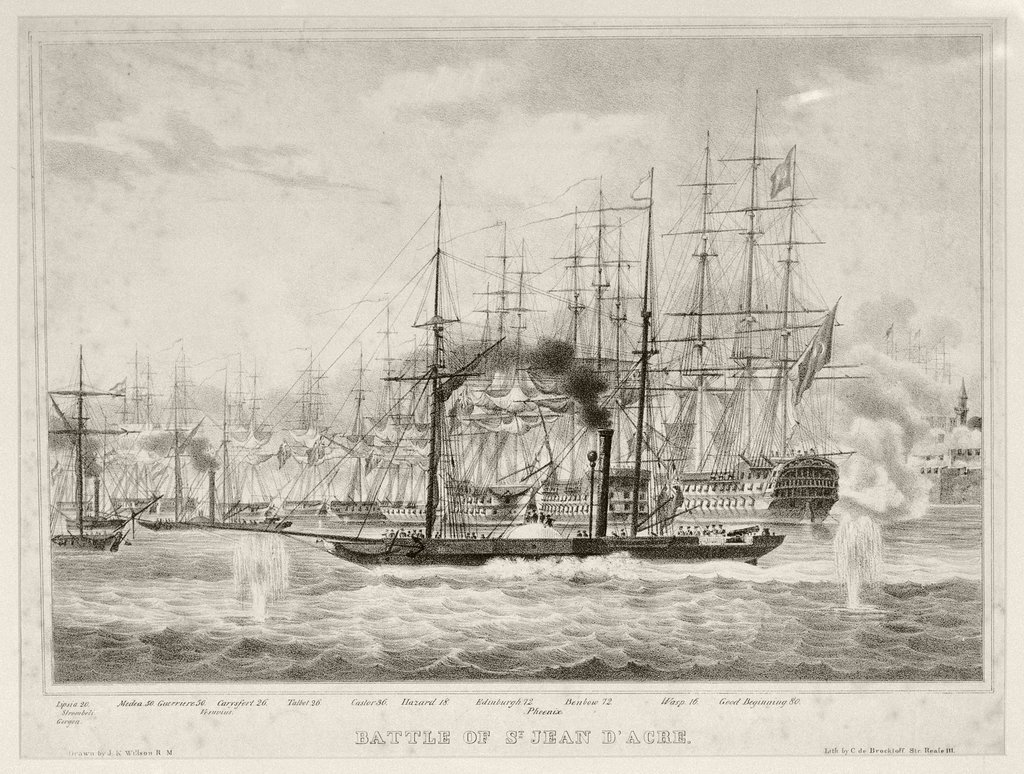
Benbow is in this picture of the Battle of St. Jean d'Acre, 3 November 1840

In 1840 Benbow saw action in the bombardment of the city of Acre under the command of Admiral Robert Stopford. At the height of the battle either Benbow or the naval steamer HMS Gorgon fired the shell that destroyed Acre's powder magazine, causing an explosion that greatly weakened the city's defences.

Benbow was used for harbour service from February 1848 until August 1859, when she was converted to be used as a coal hulk. In 1892, after 79 years of service, she was sold out of the Navy, and was broken up in 1895 at Castle, Woolwich.

== Figurehead ==
The figurehead was saved when the ship was broken up in 1895 and is now part of the collection of the National Museum of the Royal Navy, Portsmouth.

== Bibliography ==
- Colledge, J. J.; Warlow, Ben (2006) [1969]. Ships of the Royal Navy: The Complete Record of All Fighting Ships of the Royal Navy from the 15th Century to the Present (3rd Rev ed.). London: Chatham Publishing. ISBN 978-1-86176-281-8. OCLC 67375475.
- Kahanov, Yaacov; Stern, Eliezer; Cvikel, Deborah; Me-Bar, Yoav (2014), "Between Shoal and Wall: The Naval Bombardment of Akko, 1840", The Mariner's Mirror, 100 (2): 147–167, doi:10.1080/00253359.2014.901699, S2CID 110466181
- Lavery, Brian (1984). The Ship of the Line. Vol. 1: The Development of the Battlefleet 1650-1850. Naval Institute Press. ISBN 0-85177-252-8.
- Winfield, Rif (2008). British Warships in the Age of Sail 1793–1817: Design, Construction, Careers and Fates (2nd, revised ed.). Seaforth. ISBN 978-1-84415-717-4.
