= Vengeur-class ship of the line =

1809 class of British ships of the line

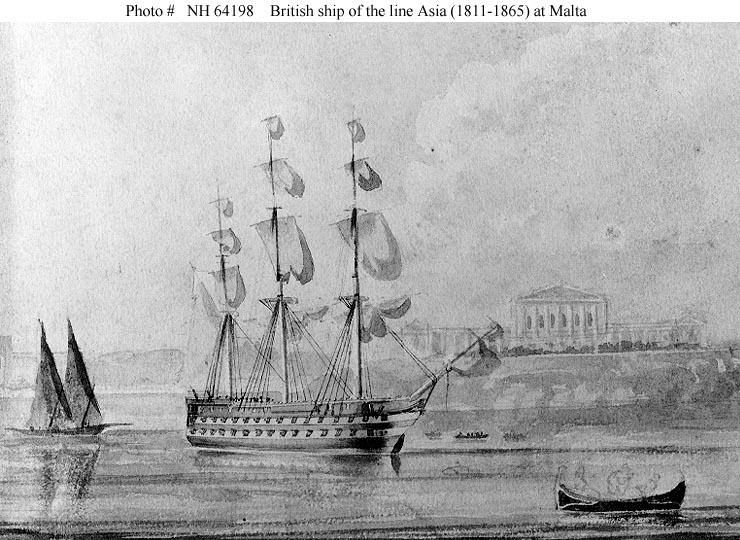
- HMS Asia

Class overview
- Name: Vengeur
- Operators: Royal Navy
- Preceded by: Swiftsure class
- Succeeded by: Black Prince class
- In service: 2 May 1809 – 1957
- Completed: 40

General characteristics
- Type: Ship of the line
- Tons burthen: 1,741 18/94 (bm)
- Length: 176 ft (53.6 m) (gundeck)
- Beam: 47 ft 6 in (14.5 m)
- Depth of hold: 21 ft (6.4 m)
- Sail plan: Full-rigged ship
- Complement: 590
- Armament: 74 muzzle-loading, smoothbore guns; Gundeck: 28 × 32 pdr guns; Upper deck: 28 × 18 pdr guns; Quarterdeck: 4 × 12 pdr guns + 10 × 32 pdr carronades; Forecastle: 2 × 12 pdr guns + 2 × 32 pdr carronades

The Vengeur-class ships of the line were a class of forty 74-gun third rates, designed for the Royal Navy as a joint effort between the two Surveyors of the Navy at the time (Sir William Rule and Henry Peake). The Vengeur Class, sometimes referred to as the Surveyors' class of third rates, amongst other names, was the most numerous class of ships of the line ever built for the Royal Navy - forty ships being completed to this design. Due to some dubious practices, primarily in the commercial dockyards used for construction, this class of ships earned itself the nickname of 'Forty Thieves.'

Between 1826 and 1832, ten of these ships were cut down by one deck (raséed) to produce 50-gun "frigates". These were the Barham, Dublin, Alfred, Cornwall, America, Conquestador, Rodney (renamed Greenwich), Vindictive, Eagle and Gloucester. Planned similar conversions of the Clarence (renamed Centurion) and Cressy around this time were cancelled, but the Warspite was additionally converted along the same lines in 1837–1840.

Around 1845 four of these ships were converted into 'blockships', the then-current term for floating batteries, equipped with a steam/screw propulsion system and re-armed with 60 guns. In this guise some of them saw action during the Crimean War. The four were the Blenheim, Ajax, La Hogue and Edinburgh. About ten years later, a further batch of five ships was similarly converted - this included the Russell, Cornwallis and Pembroke of this class (as well as the Hawke and Hastings of other designs).

== Description ==
The Vengeur-class ship of the line was designed by Sir William Rule and Henry Peake, co-Surveyors of the Navy. The design measured 176 feet (53.6 m) on the gundeck and 145 feet 1 inch (44.2 m) on the keel. She had a beam of 47 feet 6 inches (14.5 m), a depth of hold of 21 feet (6.4 m) and had a tonnage of 1,741 18/94 tons burthen. The ships' crew numbered 590 officers and ratings. They were fitted with three masts and were ship-rigged.

== Ships ==
The first ship - Vindictive - had been ordered at the start of 1806 at Portsmouth but no work had taken place until 1808. The two Surveyors produced their joint design which was approved on 1 October 1806, when three ships were ordered to this design, and a further four followed later in the same month. Another three orders were placed before the close of the year, but two of these ships (Akbar and Augusta) were cancelled in 1809.

Orders for another eighteen ships to this design were placed during 1807 (including nine of 13 July) and another six during the first half of 1808, almost all to be built by commercial contractors, to bring the total orders to thirty-five. Two of the 1806 orders were cancelled during 1809, but a further three ships were ordered from the Royal Dockyards in 1809 - 1811, and a final four on 6 January 1812, although the last of these - Boscawen - was never completed to this design.

Ship	Builder	Ordered	Laid down	Launched	Fate (year)
HMS Vindictive	Portsmouth Dockyard	15 January 1806	July 1808	30 November 1813	Wrecked (1871)
HMS Cressy	Brindley, Frindsbury	1 October 1806	March 1807	7 March 1810	Broken up (1832)
HMS Poictiers	King, Upnor	1 October 1806	August 1807	9 December 1809	Broken up (1857)
HMS La Hogue	Deptford Dockyard	1 October 1806	April 1808	3 October 1811	Broken up (1865)
HMS Vigo	Ross, Rochester	20 October 1806	April 1807	21 February 1810	Broken up (1865)
HMS Armada	Blackburn, Turnchapel	20 October 1806	February 1807	23 March 1810	Sold (1863)
HMS Vengeur	Graham, Harwich	20 October 1806	July 1807	19 June 1810	Broken up (1843)
HMS Conquestador	Guillam, Northam	20 October 1806	August 1807	1 August 1810	Sold (1897)
HMS Redoutable	Woolwich Dockyard	29 December 1806	April 1809	26 January 1815	Broken up (1841)
HMS Mulgrave	King, Upnor	23 June 1807	February 1808	1 January 1812	Broken up (1854)
HMS Ajax	Perry, Blackwall	1 July 1807	August 1807	2 May 1809	Broken up (1864)
HMS Berwick	Perry, Blackwall	1 July 1807	October 1807	11 September 1809	Broken up (1821)
HMS Egmont	Pitcher, Northfleet	13 July 1807	October 1807	7 March 1810	Sold (1875)
HMS Edinburgh	Brent, Rotherhithe	13 July 1807	November 1807	26 November 1811	Sold (1866)
HMS Clarence	Blackburn, Turnchapel, Plymouth	13 July 1807	November 1807	11 April 1812	Broken up (1828)
HMS Scarborough	Graham, Harwich	13 July 1807	January 1808	29 March 1812	Sold (1836)
HMS Asia	Brindley, Frindsbury	13 July 1807	February 1808	2 December 1811	Broken up (1865)
HMS Rodney	Barnard, Deptford Wharf	13 July 1808	March 1808	8 December 1809	Sold (1836)
HMS Duncan	Dudman, Deptford Wharf	13 July 1807	August 1808	2 December 1811	Broken up (1863)
HMS Indus	Dudman, Deptford Wharf	31 July 1807	April 1809	19 December 1812	Broken up (1868)
HMS Dublin	Brent, Rotherhithe	31 July 1807	May 1809	13 February 1812	Sold (1885)
HMS Stirling Castle	Ross, Rochester	12 August 1807	July 1808	31 December 1811	Broken up (1861)
HMS Medway	Pitcher, Northfleet	19 August 1807	December 1808	19 November 1812	Sold (1865)
HMS America	Perry, Blackwall	22 August 1807	January 1808	21 April 1810	Broken up (1867)
HMS Anson	Steemson, Hull	2 November 1807	March 1808	11 May 1812	Broken up (1851)
HMS Barham	Perry, Wells & Green, Blackwall	2 November 1807	June 1808	8 July 1811	Broken up (1839)
HMS Rippon	Blake & Scott, Bursledon	2 November 1807	October 1808	8 August 1812	Broken up (1821)
HMS Blenheim	Deptford Dockyard	4 January 1808	August 1808	31 May 1813	Broken up (1865)
HMS Pembroke	Wigram, Wells & Green, Blackwall	17 May 1808	March 1809	27 June 1812	Sold (1905)
HMS Cornwall	Barnard, Deptford Wharf	30 May 1808	March 1809	16 January 1812	Renamed Wellesley in 1868; broken up (1875)
HMS Devonshire	Barnard, Deptford Wharf	30 May 1808	February 1810	23 September 1812	Broken up (1869)
HMS Gloucester	Pitcher, Northfleet	11 June 1808	March 1808	27 February 1812	Sold (1884)
HMS Benbow	Brent, Rotherhithe	11 June 1808	July 1808	3 February 1813	Sold (1892)
HMS Defence	Chatham Dockyard	23 March 1809	May 1812 as HMS Marathon; renamed 3 January 1815	25 April 1815	Burnt (1857)
HMS Hercules	Chatham Dockyard	16 May 1809	August 1812	5 September 1815	Sold (1865)
HMS Pitt	Portsmouth Dockyard	17 April 1807	May 1813	13 April 1816	Broken up (1877)
HMS Cornwallis	Bombay Dockyard	25 July 1810	1811	12 May 1813	Broken up (1957)
HMS Agincourt	Devonport Dockyard	6 January 1812	May 1813	19 March 1817	Sold (1884)
HMS Hero	Deptford Dockyard	6 January 1812	July 1813	21 September 1816	Renamed Wellington (4 December 1816). Sold (1908)
HMS Russell	Deptford Dockyard	6 January 1812	August 1814	22 May 1822	Broken up, 1865

Two further ships were ordered to this design, including HMS Boscawen (ordered on 6 January 1812) and HMS Carnatic (ordered on 30 September 1814), but neither of these were completed to this design. Two more ordered during late 1806 - HMS Akbar begun at Prince of Wales Island, Malaya and HMS Augusta at Portsmouth - were cancelled in 1809, while another two projected in 1807 - HMS Julius planned to be built at Chatham and HMS Orford at Rio de Janeiro - were never ordered.

HMS Wellesley (ordered on 3 September 1812) was also built to this design in Bombay, using the moulds of Cornwallis after the Navy Board's set of plans sent for the construction of Wellesley were lost en route to India. It was always officially classified as a Black Prince-class ship of the line however, in accordance with the order placed in 1812.

== In fiction ==
A fictitious member of this class of 74s, HMS Worcester, features largely in The Ionian Mission, one of the Aubrey-Maturin series of novels by Patrick O'Brian.

== Bibliography ==
- Lambert, Andrew D. (1984). Battleships in Transition: The Creation of the Steam Battlefleet 1815-1860. Conway Maritime Press. ISBN 0-85177-315-X.
- Lambert, Andrew D. (1991). The Last Sailing Battlefleet: Maintaining Naval Mastery 1815 - 1850. Conway Maritime Press. ISBN 0-85177-591-8.
- Lavery, Brian (1984). The Ship of the Line. Vol. 1: The Development of the Battlefleet 1650-1850. Naval Institute Press. ISBN 0-85177-252-8.
- Winfield, Rif (2008) [2005]. British Warships in the Age of Sail 1793–1817: Design, Construction, Careers and Fates (2nd, revised ed.). Seaforth. ISBN 978-1-84415-717-4.
- Winfield, Rif (2014). British Warships in the Age of Sail 1817–1863: Design, Construction, Careers and Fates. Seaforth Publishing. ISBN 978-1-84832-169-4.
