= HMS Pembroke (1812) =

Vengeur-class ship of the line

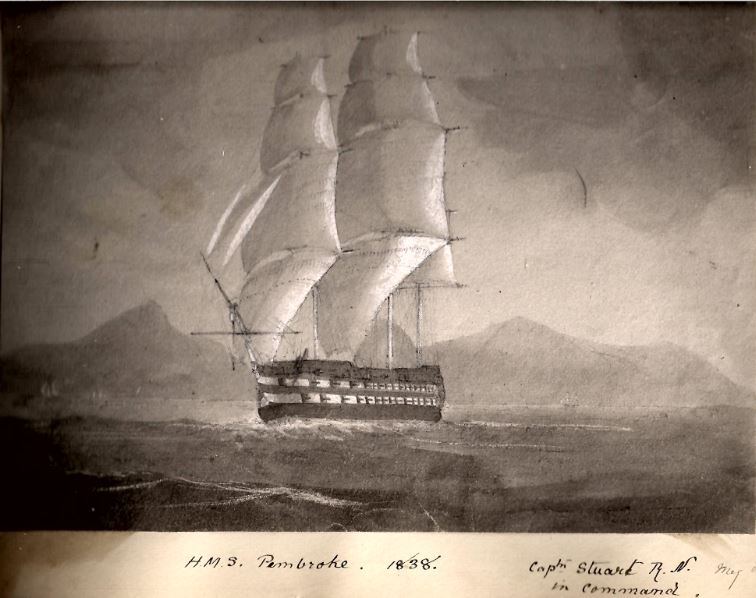
- A print of Pembroke

History

United Kingdom
- Name: Pembroke
- Ordered: 17 May 1808
- Builder: Perry, Wells & Green, Blackwall Yard
- Laid down: March 1809
- Launched: 27 June 1812
- Commissioned: September 1812
- Fate: Sold, July 1905

General characteristics (as built)
- Class & type: Vengeur-class ship of the line
- Tons burthen: 1,758 17/94 (bm)
- Length: 176 ft (53.6 m) (gundeck)
- Beam: 47 ft 9 in (14.6 m)
- Draught: 17 ft 10 in (5.4 m) (light)
- Depth of hold: 21 ft 1 in (6.4 m)
- Sail plan: Full-rigged ship
- Complement: 590
- Armament: 74 muzzle-loading, smoothbore guns; Gundeck: 28 × 32 pdr guns; Upper deck: 28 × 18 pdr guns; Quarterdeck: 4 × 12 pdr guns + 10 × 32 pdr carronades; Forecastle: 2 × 12 pdr guns + 2 × 32 pdr carronades

HMS Pembroke was a 74-gun third rate Vengeur-class ship of the line built for the Royal Navy in the first decade of the 19th century. Completed in 1812, she played a minor role in the Napoleonic Wars.

Pembroke was driven ashore near Portsmouth in late December 1812. She was refloated on 29 December 1812 by the frigates HMS Niobe and HMS Pomone and the ship-sloop HMS Rosamond.

As a part of a squadron under the command of Sir James Brisbane Pembroke, in company with Alcmene and Aigle, on 11 April 1814 captured Fortune, Notre Dame de Leusainte, and a settee of unknown name, at Fort Maurigio, in the Gulf of Genoa, near Monaco. The squadron silenced the fort's guns, and attacked 20 vessels; 4 were captured, and the cargoes of another 15 taken off ships whose crews scuttled them. (Note: A first-class share of the prize money was worth £95 4s 0d; a sixth-class share, that of an ordinary seaman, was worth 12s 7d.)

In 1836 Pembroke formed part of an experimental squadron, which were groups of ships sent out in the 1830s and 1840s to test new techniques of ship design, armament, building, and propulsion. In March 1837, she was driven ashore at Gibraltar, but she later was refloated with assistance from the French steamship Minos.

Pembroke was fitted with screw propulsion in 1855. On 16 September 1857, she ran down and sank the British brig Lady Sale off the Isle of May. The Admiralty Court found Pembroke to blame for the collision. She was transferred to the Coastguard in 1858, and used as a base ship from 1887. She was renamed HMS Forte as a receiving hulk in 1890, and was eventually sold out of the navy in 1905.

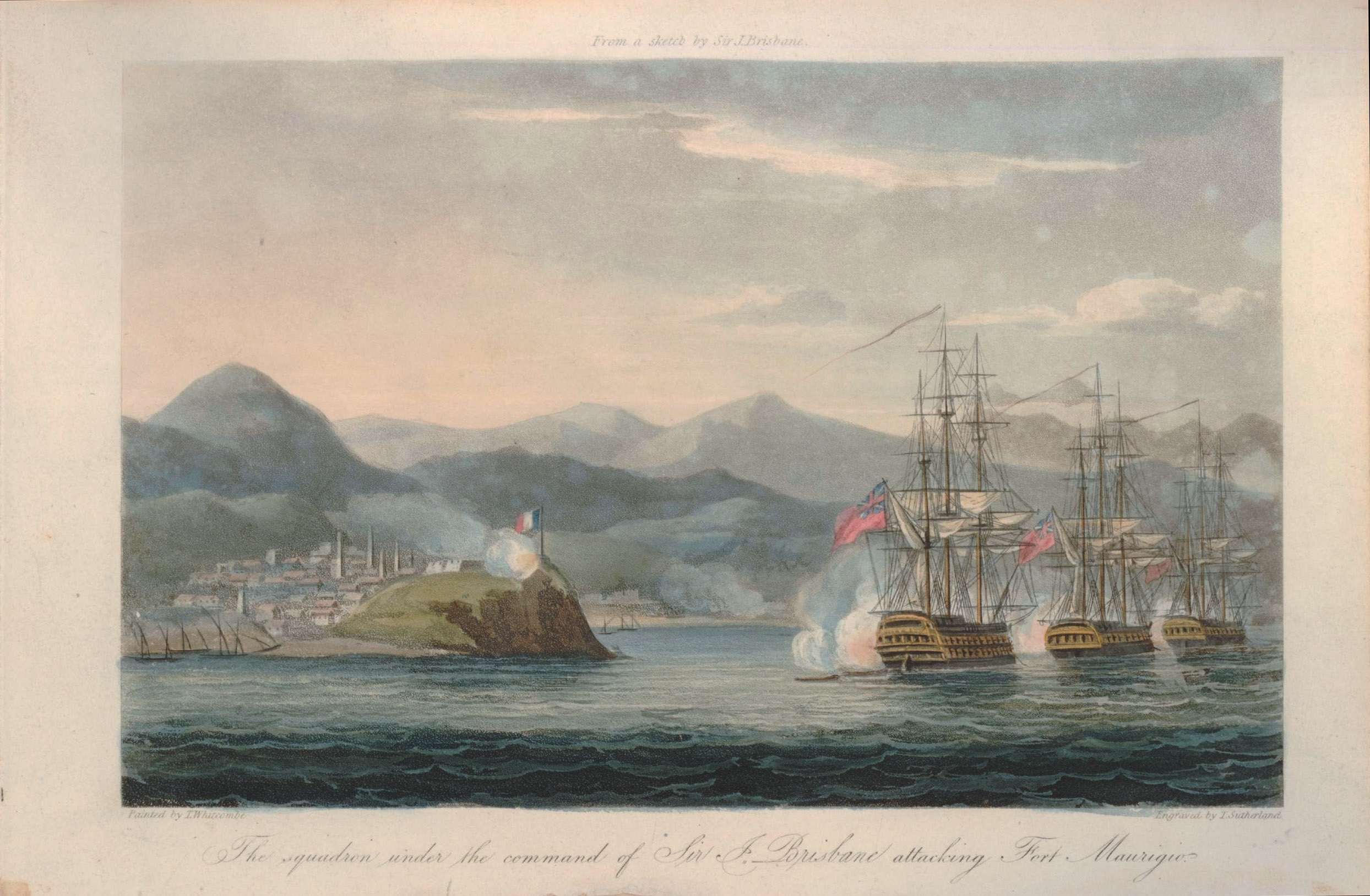
Squadron under the command of Sir J Brisbane attacking Fort Maurigio 1814

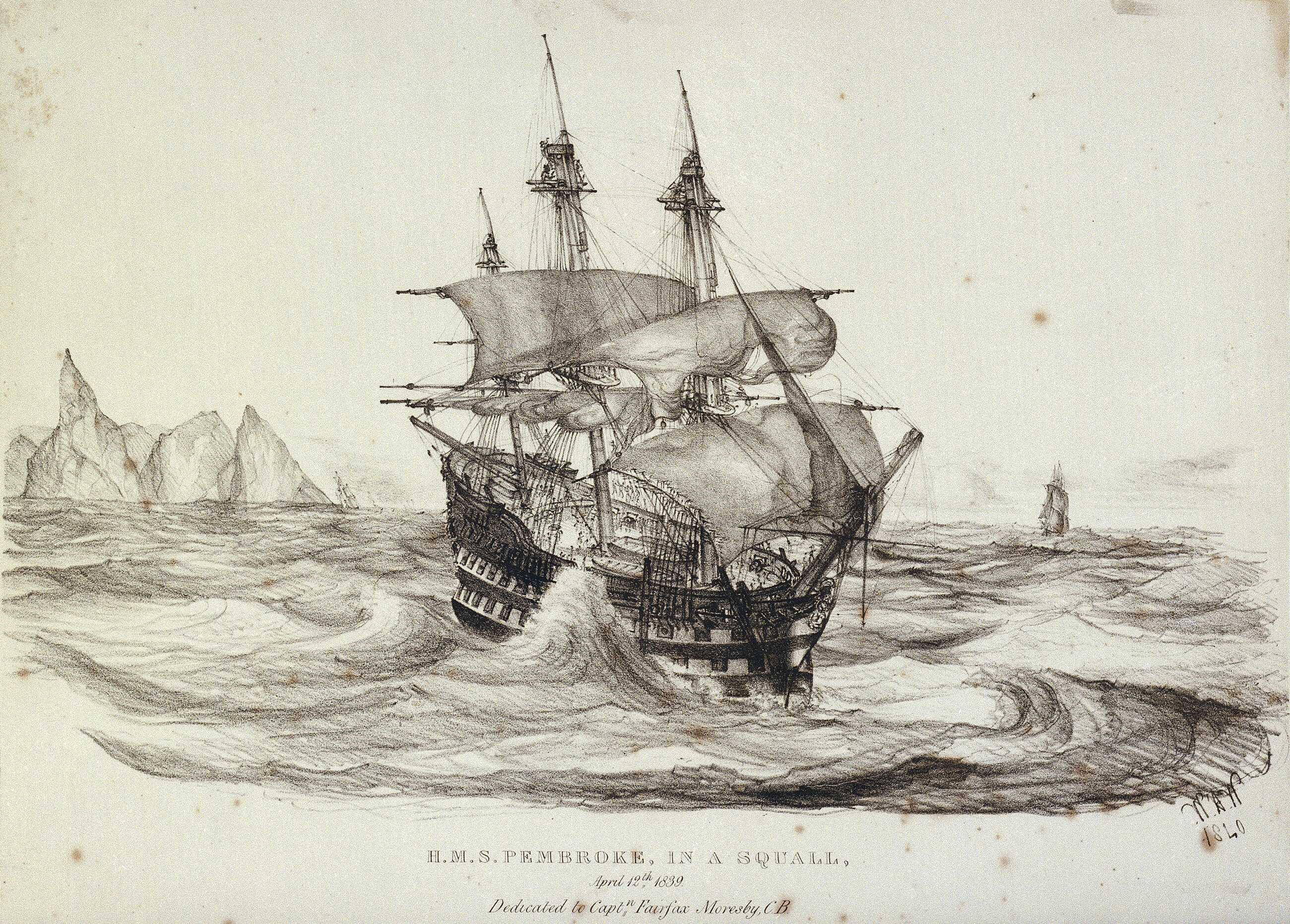
HMS Pembroke in a squall, 12 April 1839

== Publications ==
- Lavery, Brian (1984). The Ship of the Line. Vol. 1: The Development of the Battlefleet 1650-1850. Naval Institute Press. ISBN 0-85177-252-8.
- Lambert, Andrew D. (1984). Battleships in Transition: The Creation of the Steam Battlefleet 1815-1860. Conway Maritime Press. ISBN 0-85177-315-X.
- Lambert, Andrew D. (1991). The Last Sailing Battlefleet: Maintaining Naval Mastery 1815 - 1850. Conway Maritime Press. ISBN 0-85177-591-8.
- Winfield, Rif (2008). British Warships in the Age of Sail 1793–1817: Design, Construction, Careers and Fates (2nd, revised ed.). Seaforth. ISBN 978-1-84415-717-4.
- Winfield, Rif (2014). British Warships in the Age of Sail 1817–1863: Design, Construction, Careers and Fates. Seaforth Publishing. ISBN 978-1-84832-169-4.
