= HMS Edinburgh (1811) =

Vengeur-class ship of the line

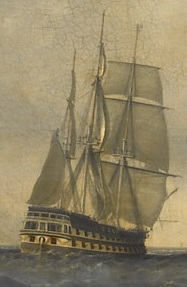
- Edinburgh by John Lynn

History

United Kingdom
- Name: Edinburgh
- Ordered: 13 July 1807
- Builder: Samuel & Daniel Brent, Rotherhithe
- Laid down: November 1807
- Launched: 26 November 1811
- Commissioned: June 1811
- Fate: Sold for scrap, November 1865

General characteristics (as built)
- Class & type: Vengeur-class ship of the line
- Tons burthen: 1,772 45/94 (bm)
- Length: 176 ft 6 in (53.8 m) (gundeck)
- Beam: 47 ft 10 in (14.6 m)
- Draught: 17 ft 7 in (5.4 m) (light)
- Depth of hold: 21 ft (6.4 m)
- Sail plan: Full-rigged ship
- Complement: 590
- Armament: 74 muzzle-loading, smoothbore guns; Gundeck: 28 × 32 pdr guns; Upper deck: 28 × 18 pdr guns; Quarterdeck: 4 × 12 pdr guns + 10 × 32 pdr carronades; Forecastle: 2 × 12 pdr guns + 2 × 32 pdr carronades

HMS Edinburgh was a 74-gun third rate Vengeur-class ship of the line built for the Royal Navy in the first decade of the 19th century. Completed in 1811, she played a minor role in the Napoleonic Wars.

Between 1837 and 1841 she served in the Mediterranean, including operations off the coast of Syria and Lebanon in the Syrian War. In 1846 she was taken in hand at Portsmouth Dockyard and converted to steam-powered screw propulsion as a 'blockship'. The conversion was completed on 19 August 1852. In this transformation her displacement was increased to 2,598 tons and her complement of guns reduced to 60 (or 56: reports differ). She acted as guard ship for Devonport until February 1854, when she was assigned to the fleet sent to the Baltic under Sir Charles Napier. She was the flagship of Rear-Admiral Henry Ducie Chads, third in command of the fleet, and took part in the bombardment and capture of the Russian fortress of Bomarsund on Åland. She returned to the Baltic in 1855. Subsequently, she was a guard ship at Sheerness and at Leith, and was sold out of the Navy for breaking up in 1866.
