= HMS Russell (1822) =

Vengeur-class ship of the line

- Plan drawing of Russell

History

United Kingdom
- Name: Russell
- Ordered: 6 January 1812
- Builder: Deptford Dockyard
- Laid down: August 1814
- Launched: 22 May 1822
- Commissioned: July 1835
- Fate: Broken up, 1865

General characteristics (as built)
- Class & type: Vengeur-class ship of the line
- Tons burthen: 1,750 74/94 (bm)
- Length: 176 ft 6 in (53.8 m) (gundeck)
- Beam: 48 ft 3 in (14.7 m)
- Draught: 17 ft 3 in (5.3 m) (light)
- Depth of hold: 21 ft (6.4 m)
- Sail plan: Full-rigged ship
- Complement: 590
- Armament: 74 muzzle-loading, smoothbore guns; Gundeck: 28 × 32 pdr guns; Upper deck: 28 × 18 pdr guns; Quarterdeck: 4 × 12 pdr guns + 10 × 32 pdr carronades; Forecastle: 2 × 12 pdr guns + 2 × 32 pdr carronades

HMS Russell was a 74-gun third rate Vengeur-class ship of the line built for the Royal Navy in the 1810s. Not completed until 1835, she was fitted with screw propulsion in 1855, and was broken up in 1865.
