= HMS Vindictive (1813) =

Vengeur-class ship of the line

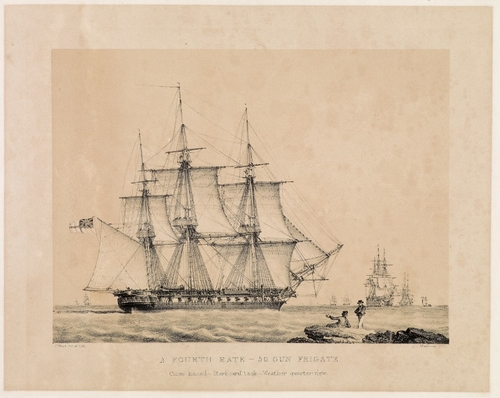
- Vindictive as a frigate

History

United Kingdom
- Name: Vindictive
- Ordered: 15 January 1806
- Builder: Portsmouth Dockyard
- Laid down: July 1808
- Launched: 23 November 1813
- Completed: December 1813
- Commissioned: 17 October 1841
- Reclassified: As a 50-gun fourth-rate frigate, October 1832; As a storeship, January 1862
- Fate: Wrecked, July 1871

General characteristics (as built)
- Class & type: Vengeur-class ship of the line
- Tons burthen: 1,757 71/94 (bm)
- Length: 176 ft 2 in (53.7 m) (gundeck)
- Beam: 47 ft 8 in (14.5 m)
- Draught: 17 ft 8 in (5.4 m) (light)
- Depth of hold: 21 ft (6.4 m)
- Sail plan: Full-rigged ship
- Complement: 590
- Armament: 74 muzzle-loading, smoothbore guns; Gundeck: 28 × 32 pdr guns; Upper deck: 28 × 18 pdr guns; Quarterdeck: 4 × 12 pdr guns + 10 × 32 pdr carronades; Forecastle: 2 × 12 pdr guns + 2 × 32 pdr carronades

HMS Vindictive was the lead ship of her class of 74-gun third-rate ships of the line built for the Royal Navy during the 1810s. The ship was immediately placed in ordinary when she was completed in 1813. She was razeed in 1828–1832 and reclassified as a 50-gun fourth-rate frigate. Vindictive was finally commissioned in 1842 where she served on the East Indies Station and served as the flagship on the North America and West Indies Station from 1844 to 1848. The ship was converted into a storeship in 1861–1862 and foundered at the island of Fernando Po in 1871. Her wreck was sold for scrap later that year.

== Description ==
The Vengeur-class ship of the line was designed by Sir William Rule and Henry Peake, co-Surveyors of the Navy. Vindictive measured 176 feet 2 inches (53.7 m) on the gundeck and 145 feet 2 inches (44.2 m) on the keel. She had a beam of 47 feet 8 inches (14.5 m), a depth of hold of 21 feet (6.4 m) and had a tonnage of 1,757 71/94 tons burthen. The ship's draught was 13 feet 3 inches (4.0 m) forward and 17 feet 8 inches (5.4 m) aft at light load; fully loaded, her draught would be significantly deeper. The ships' crew numbered 590 officers and ratings. They were fitted with three masts and were ship-rigged.

The Vengeur-class ships were armed with 74 muzzle-loading, smoothbore guns that consisted of twenty-eight 32-pounder guns on their lower gundeck and twenty-eight 18-pounder guns on their upper deck. Their forecastle mounted a pair of 12-pounder guns and two 32-pounder carronades. On their quarterdeck they carried four 12-pounders and ten 32-pounder carronades. After the end of the Napoleonic Wars in 1815, their armament was revised with one pair of lower deck guns replaced by 68-pounder carronades and one pair of upper deck guns replaced by 18-pounder carronades.

Vindictive had her upper deck removed when she was ordered to be razeed in 1828. This reduced her crew to 450 men and her armament to twenty-eight 32-pounder (56 cwt) (Note: "Cwt" is the abbreviation for hundredweight, 56 cwt referring to the weight of the gun.) guns on her deck with sixteen 32-pounder (48 cwt) guns on her quarterdeck and six more on the forecastle.

== Construction and career ==
Vindictive was the third ship of her name to serve with the Royal Navy. The ship was ordered on 15 January 1806 prior to the design for this class being finalised on 1 October. She was laid down at Portsmouth Dockyard in July 1808 and launched on 23 November 1813. Vindictive was completed for ordinary in December. She was refitted to serve as the flagship of the Commander-in-chief of the Ordinary in December 1816. The ship was ordered to be cut down into a 50-gun frigate; the work began on March 1828 and was completed in January 1833. She was reclassified as a fourth rate in October 1832.

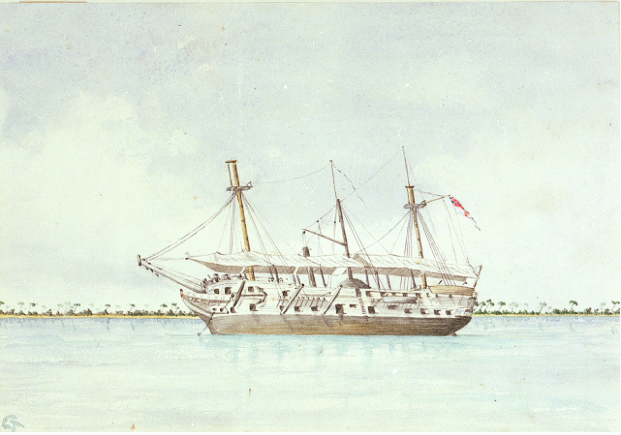
Vindictive in the tropics

Vindictive was commissioned by Captain John Toup Nicolas in 17 October 1841 as the ship was outfitted for sea from October 1841 to 15 January 1842. On 26 January, she ran aground on The Dean, in the English Channel off the Isle of Wight; she was refloated the next day. Vindictive served on the East Indies Station until returning home in 1844, Captain Michael Seymour was appointed in command on 16 January 1845. The ship then became the flagship for Vice-Admiral Francis William Austen, Commander-in-Chief of the North America and West Indies Station. She was laid up in ordinary again in June 1848 at Portsmouth. The ship was fitted as a storeship by J. Samuel White at Cowes from February 1861 to January 1862. Vindictive then proceeded to Fernando Po. She foundered there in July 1871; her wreck was sold on 24 November 1871.
