= HMS Defence (1815) =

Vengeur-class ship of the line

- Plan drawing of Defence

History

United Kingdom
- Name: Defence
- Ordered: 23 March 1809
- Builder: Chatham Dockyard
- Laid down: May 1812
- Launched: 25 April 1815
- Completed: 7 June 1815
- Fate: Scrapped, 21 January 1858

General characteristics (as built)
- Class & type: Vengeur-class ship of the line
- Tons burthen: 1,754 9/94 (bm)
- Length: 174 ft (53.0 m) (gundeck)
- Beam: 47 ft 8 in (14.5 m)
- Draught: 18 ft (5.5 m) (light)
- Depth of hold: 21 ft (6.4 m)
- Sail plan: Full-rigged ship
- Complement: 590
- Armament: 74 muzzle-loading, smoothbore guns; Gundeck: 28 × 32 pdr guns; Upper deck: 28 × 18 pdr guns; Quarterdeck: 4 × 12 pdr guns + 10 × 32 pdr carronades; Forecastle: 2 × 12 pdr guns + 2 × 32 pdr carronades

HMS Defence was a 74-gun third rate Vengeur-class ship of the line built for the Royal Navy in the 1810s. Completed in 1815, she was never commissioned and served as a prison ship beginning in 1851. Badly damaged by a fire in 1857 the ship was broken up for scrap in 1858.

== History ==
HMS Defence was ordered on 23 March 1809 and laid down in May 1812 at Chatham Dockyard. She was launched on 25 April 1815 and served as a 74-gun third-rate ship of the line.

In 1849, she was converted to serve as a prison ship. On 14 July 1857, Defence was badly damaged by an accidental fire at Woolwich, likely caused by spontaneous combustion in a recently delivered load of coal. The fire was extinguished by scuttling the ship, and the remains were subsequently broken up later that year.

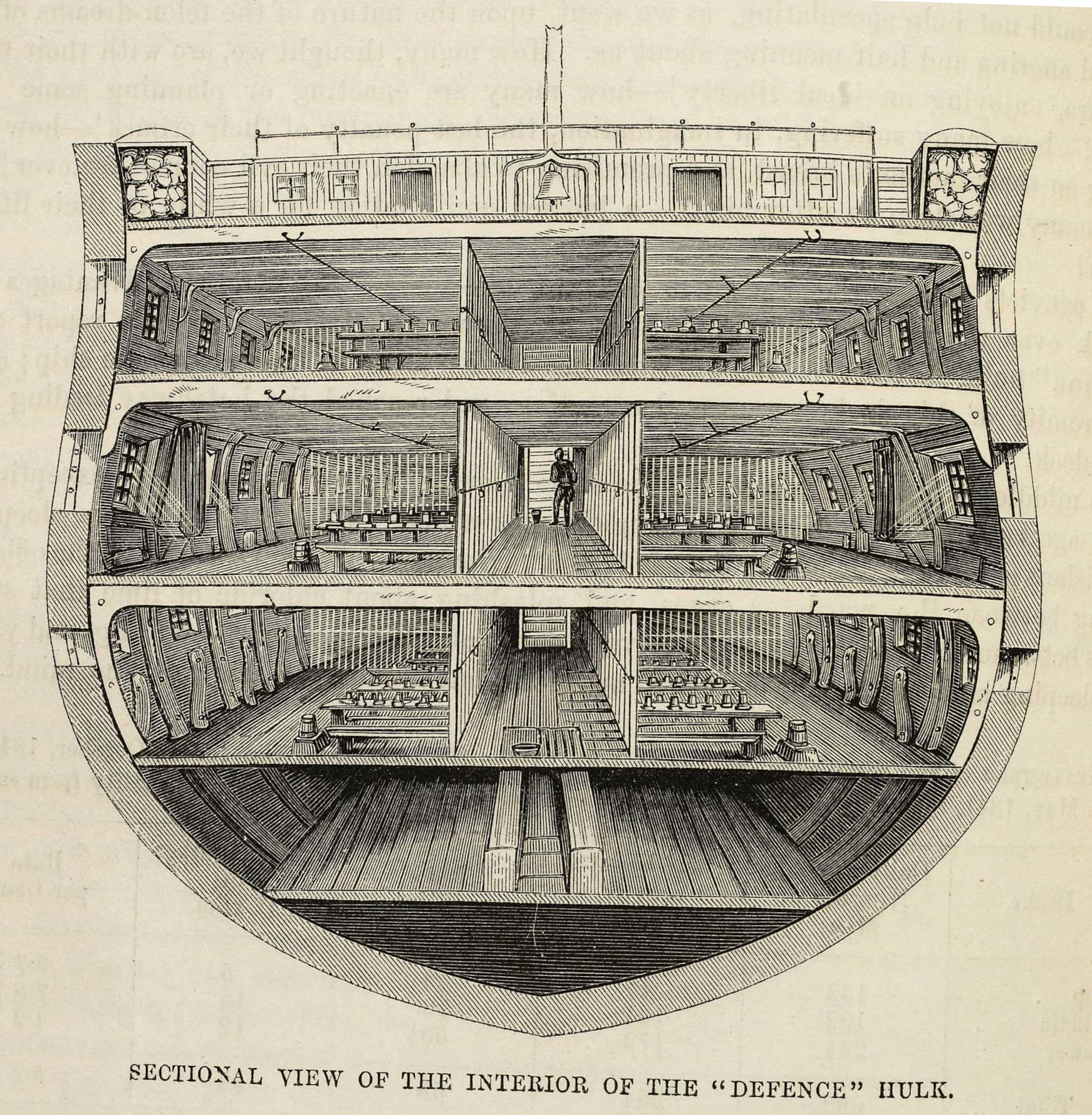
Sectional view of the interior of the Defence Hulk, (The Woolwich prison ships)

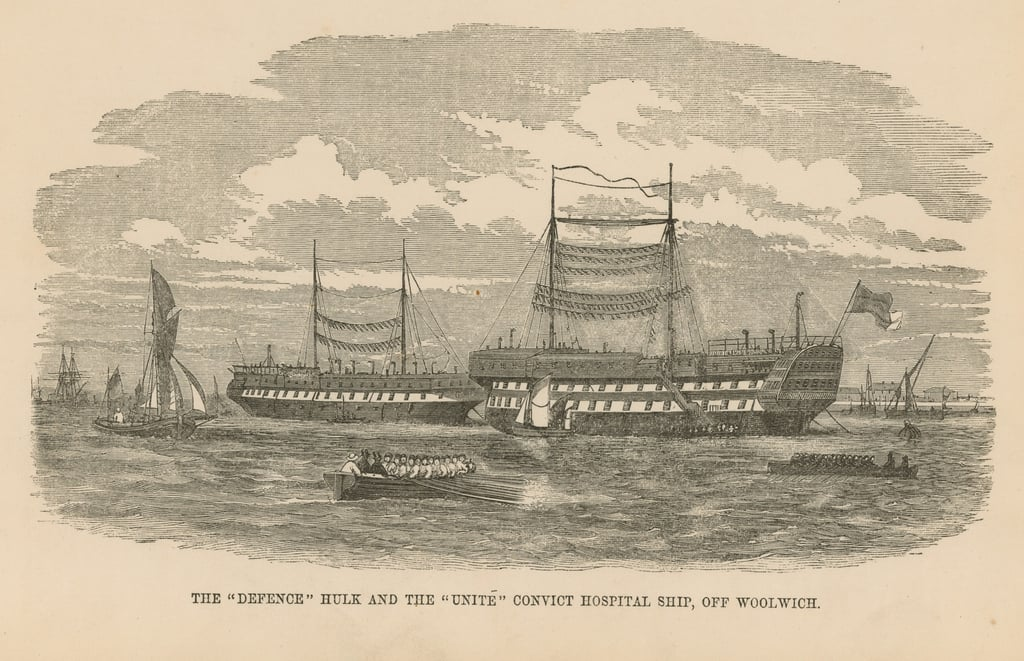
The Defence hulk and the Unite convict hospital ship, off Woolwich
