= HMS Hercules (1815) =

1815 Vengeur-class ship of the line

- Plan drawing of Hercules

History

United Kingdom
- Name: Hercules
- Ordered: 16 May 1809
- Builder: Chatham Dockyard
- Laid down: August 1812
- Launched: 5 September 1815
- Completed: 17 November 1815
- Commissioned: March 1836
- Fate: Sold out of the service, 22 August 1865

General characteristics (as built)
- Class & type: Vengeur-class ship of the line
- Tons burthen: 1,749 56/94 (bm)
- Length: 176 ft 1 in (53.7 m) (gundeck)
- Beam: 47 ft 7 in (14.5 m)
- Draught: 17 ft 10 in (5.4 m) (light)
- Depth of hold: 21 ft (6.4 m)
- Sail plan: Full-rigged ship
- Complement: 590
- Armament: 74 muzzle-loading, smoothbore guns; Gundeck: 28 × 32 pdr guns; Upper deck: 28 × 18 pdr guns; Quarterdeck: 4 × 12 pdr guns + 10 × 32 pdr carronades; Forecastle: 2 × 12 pdr guns + 2 × 32 pdr carronades

HMS Hercules was a 74-gun third rate Vengeur-class ship of the line built for the Royal Navy in the 1810s. Completed in 1815, she was immediately placed in ordinary.

In 1836 she formed part of an experimental squadron, which were groups of ships sent out in the 1830s and 1840s to test new techniques of ship design, armament, building and propulsion.

On 26 December 1852 Hercules departed on her way to Hong Kong to take up duties as a hospital ship. The gold rushes had put a premium on passenger ships to Australia, so she took 756 Scots civilian passengers to South Australia and Victoria for the Highland and Island Emigration Society. Many of these were emigrating under duress from the trustees of the Boreraig, Suishnish and North Uist estates of Lord Macdonald. The voyage proved disastrous, beginning almost immediately with a horrific storm, during which the ship sought refuge at Rothesay. Soon after their second departure in early January 1853, outbreaks of smallpox and typhus were discovered, necessitating a three-month quarantine at Queenstown, County Cork. 56 people died, 17 orphaned children were returned home and many others were assigned to a dozen other ships, families being broken up in the process. The ship finally arrived in Adelaide in July 1853.

Later in 1853 Hercules was placed on harbour service. In 1854 she proceeded to Hong Kong to serve as a depot and receiving ship, and she was sold there on 22 August 1865 to be broken.
