= HMS Redoubtable (1815) =

Vengeur-class ship of the line

- Redoubtable

History

United Kingdom
- Name: Redoubtable
- Ordered: 29 December 1806
- Builder: Woolwich Dockyard
- Laid down: April 1809
- Launched: 26 January 1815
- Commissioned: Never commissioned
- Fate: Broken up, May 1841

General characteristics (as built)
- Class & type: Vengeur-class ship of the line
- Tons burthen: 1,758 91/94 (bm)
- Length: 176 ft 5 in (53.8 m) (gundeck)
- Beam: 47 ft 8 in (14.5 m)
- Depth of hold: 21 ft 1 in (6.4 m)
- Sail plan: Full-rigged ship
- Complement: 590
- Armament: 74 muzzle-loading, smoothbore guns; Gundeck: 28 × 32 pdr guns; Upper deck: 28 × 18 pdr guns; Quarterdeck: 4 × 12 pdr guns + 10 × 32 pdr carronades; Forecastle: 2 × 12 pdr guns + 2 × 32 pdr carronades

HMS Redoubtable was a 74-gun third rate Vengeur-class ship of the line built for the Royal Navy in the 1810s. Completed in 1815, she was immediately placed in ordinary and was never commissioned.

Redoubtable was broken up in 1841.
