= HMS Clarence (1812) =

Vengeur-class ship of the line

- Plan drawing of Clarence

History

United Kingdom
- Name: Clarence
- Ordered: 13 July 1807
- Builder: Isaac Blackburn, Turnchapel
- Laid down: November 1807
- Launched: 11 April 1812
- Commissioned: July 1812
- Fate: Broken up, October 1828

General characteristics (as built)
- Class & type: Vengeur-class ship of the line
- Tons burthen: 1,749 (bm)
- Length: 176 ft (53.6 m) (gundeck)
- Beam: 47 ft 7 in (14.5 m)
- Draught: 17 ft 3 in (5.3 m) (light)
- Depth of hold: 21 ft (6.4 m)
- Sail plan: Full-rigged ship
- Complement: 590
- Armament: 74 muzzle-loading, smoothbore guns; Gundeck: 28 × 32 pdr guns; Upper deck: 28 × 18 pdr guns; Quarterdeck: 4 × 12 pdr guns + 10 × 32 pdr carronades; Forecastle: 2 × 12 pdr guns + 2 × 32 pdr carronades

HMS Clarence was a 74-gun third rate Vengeur-class ship of the line built for the Royal Navy in the first decade of the 19th century. Completed in 1812, she played a minor role in the Napoleonic Wars.

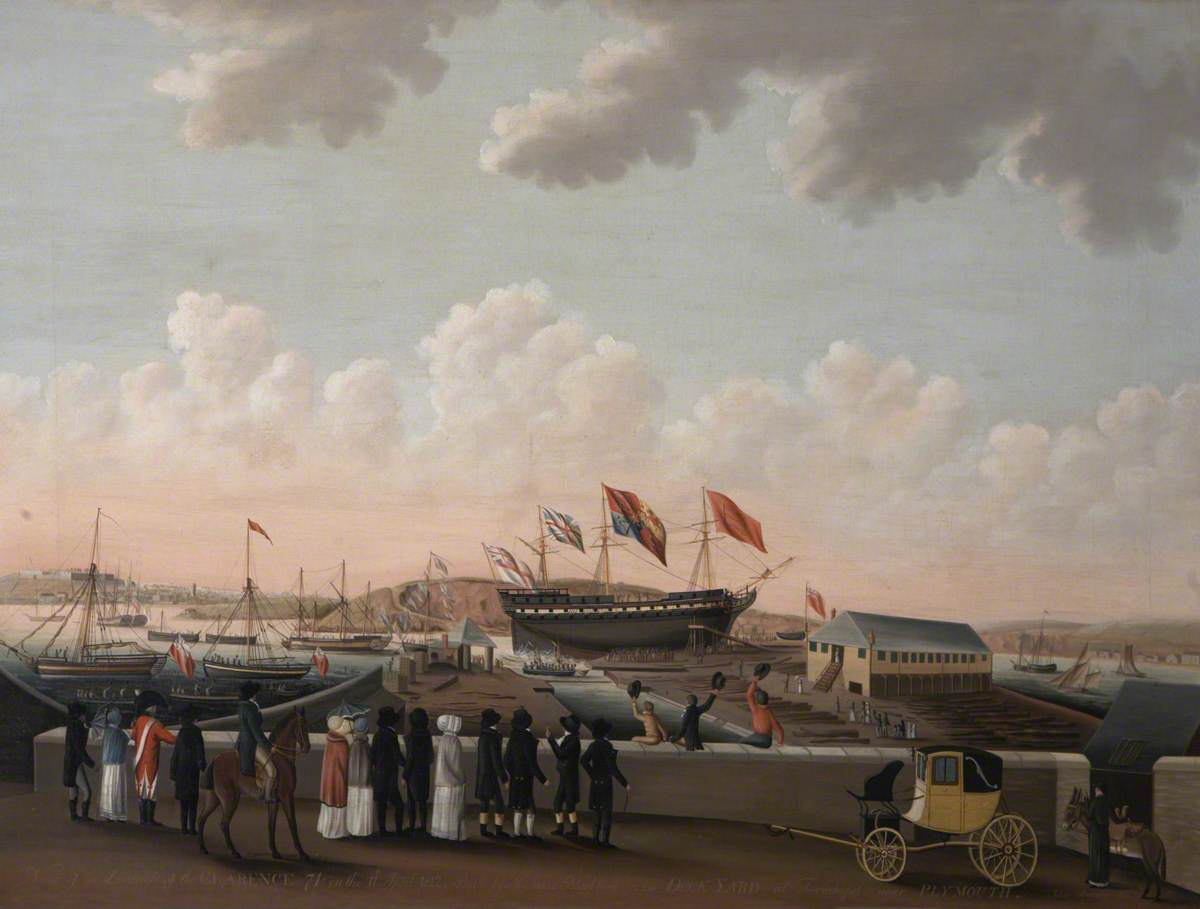
Launch of the Clarence, at Blackburn's Dock Yard, Turnchapel, near Plymouth, by John Rogers

Clarence was among a number of vessels that shared in the proceeds of the recapture of Wolfe's Cove on 1 December 1813. (Note: A first-class share of the salvage money was worth £65 6s 3d; a sixth-class share, that of an ordinary seaman, was worth 6s 11¼d.)

In 1826 Clarence was re-rated as a fourth rate. She was broken up in 1828.
