= HMS Wellington (1816) =

Vengeur-class ship of the line

- Plan drawing of Wellington

History

United Kingdom
- Name: Hero
- Ordered: 6 January 1812
- Builder: Deptford Dockyard
- Laid down: July 1813
- Launched: 21 September 1816
- Completed: 6 December 1816
- Commissioned: March 1848
- Renamed: Wellington, 4 December 1816
- Fate: Sold for scrap, 8 April 1908

General characteristics (as built)
- Class & type: Vengeur-class ship of the line
- Tons burthen: 1,757 19/94 (bm)
- Length: 176 ft 6 in (53.8 m) (gundeck)
- Beam: 48 ft 5 in (14.8 m)
- Draught: 17 ft 7 in (5.4 m) (light)
- Depth of hold: 21 ft (6.4 m)
- Sail plan: Full-rigged ship
- Complement: 590
- Armament: 74 muzzle-loading, smoothbore guns; Gundeck: 28 × 32 pdr guns; Upper deck: 28 × 18 pdr guns; Quarterdeck: 4 × 12 pdr guns + 10 × 32 pdr carronades; Forecastle: 2 × 12 pdr guns + 2 × 32 pdr carronades

HMS Akbar was a 74-gun third rate Vengeur-class ship of the line built for the Royal Navy in the 1810s. Originally named Hero, the ship was renamed Wellington shortly after she was launched in 1816. Completed later that year, she was immediately placed in ordinary.

She became a training ship in 1862 and was renamed Akbar; she was eventually sold out of the Navy in 1908 and broken up.

== Service history ==
Hero was launched on 21 September 1816 at Deptford Dockyard. The ship was renamed Wellington on 4 December 1816.

In 1826, HMS Wellington introduced mosquitos to the Hawaiian Islands. These mosquitoes were introduced to a stream on Maui when sailors seeking fresh water rinsed out their water barrels in the stream. Prior to this, no mosquitoes lived in Hawaii.

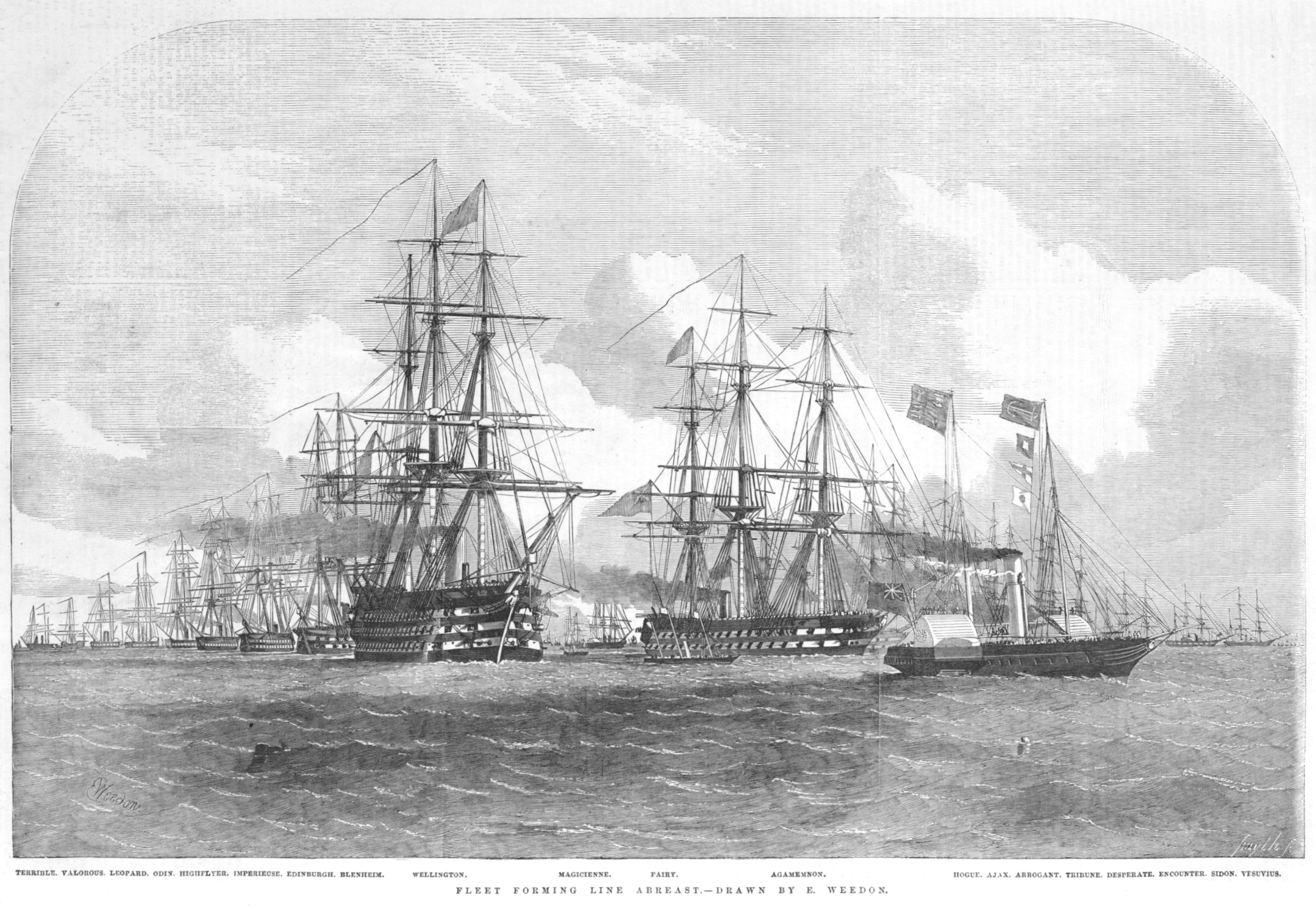
Fleet Forming Line Abreast at the 1853 Review, Illustrated London News

Wellington was converted to a training ship and named Akbar on 10 May 1862. In January 1877, she was driven ashore at Rock Ferry, Cheshire. She was refloated on 4 January. Akbar served in as a training ship until 1908. She arrived at Thos. W. Ward, Morecambe on 8 April 1908 for breaking up.
