= HMS Barham (1811) =

Vengeur-class ship of the line

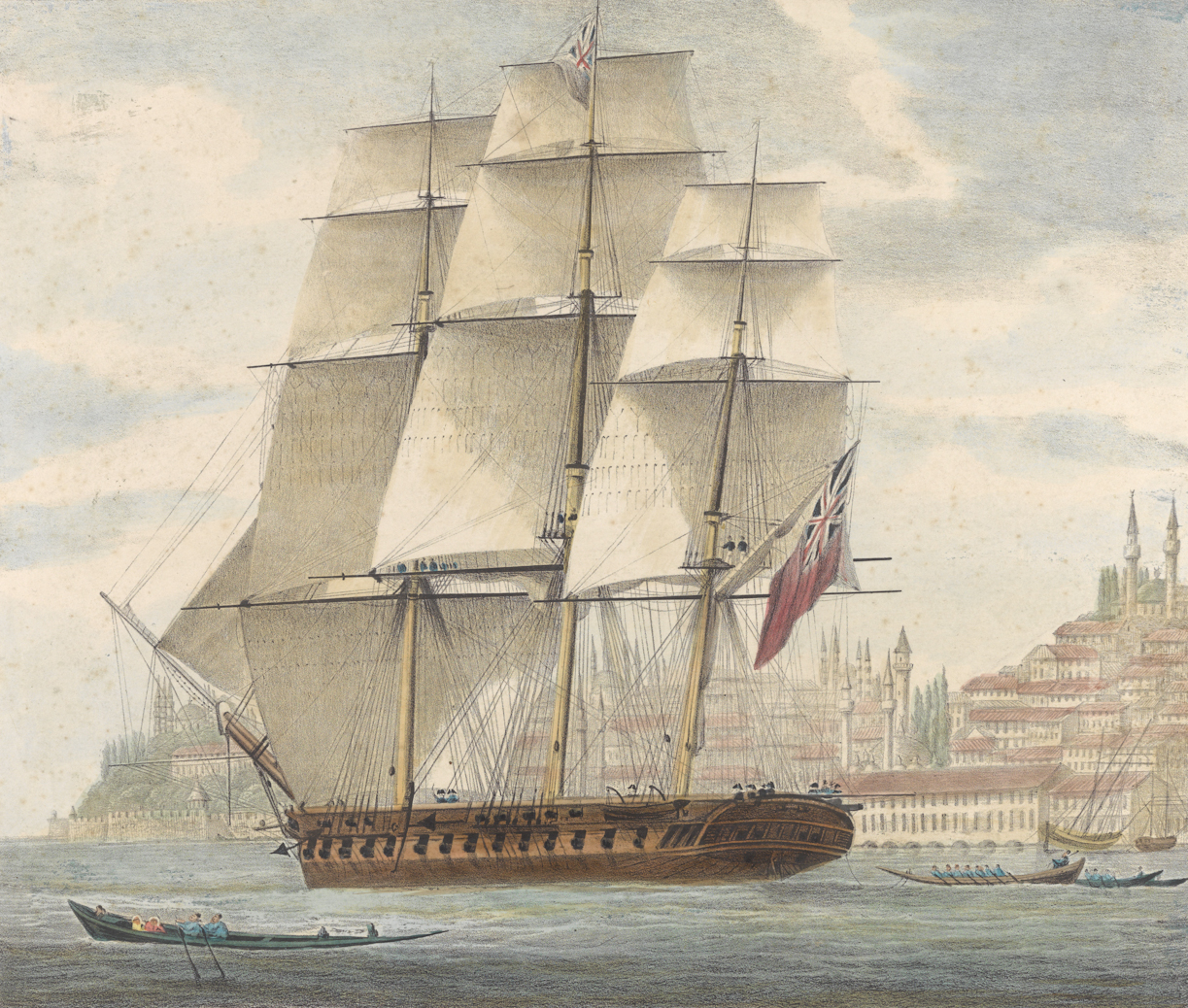
- Barham (as a 50-gun ship) at Constantinople on 25 September 1833

History

United Kingdom
- Name: Barham
- Ordered: 2 November 1807
- Builder: Perry, Wells & Green, Blackwall Yard
- Laid down: June 1808
- Launched: 8 July 1811
- Commissioned: February 1812
- Fate: Broken up, March 1840

General characteristics (as built)
- Class & type: Vengeur-class ship of the line
- Tons burthen: 1,761 (bm)
- Length: 176 ft (53.6 m) (gundeck)
- Beam: 47 ft 9 in (14.6 m)
- Draught: 17 ft 6 in (5.3 m) (light)
- Depth of hold: 21 ft 1 in (6.4 m)
- Sail plan: Full-rigged ship
- Complement: 590
- Armament: 74 muzzle-loading, smoothbore guns; Gundeck: 28 × 32 pdr guns; Upper deck: 28 × 18 pdr guns; Quarterdeck: 4 × 12 pdr guns + 10 × 32 pdr carronades; Forecastle: 2 × 12 pdr guns + 2 × 32 pdr carronades

HMS Barham was a 74-gun third rate Vengeur-class ship of the line built for the Royal Navy in the first decade of the 19th century. Completed in 1812, she played a minor role in the Napoleonic Wars.

In 1826 Barham was reduced to a 50-gun ship. On 29 April 1829 she suffered severe damage when she ran aground off Bonaire; she was refloated on 30 April 1829 after her crew threw 37 cannon overboard. She was broken up in 1839.

== Notable crew ==
- Midshipman Francis Edward Bigge, a pioneer in Queensland, Australia
- Commander John William Spranger
- Commander Baldwin Wake Walker
