= HMS Rodney (1809) =

Vengeur-class ship of the line

- 'Rodney'of the 'Armada'/'Conquestadore'/'Vangeur' class (1806)

History

United Kingdom
- Name: Rodney
- Ordered: 13 July 1807
- Builder: Frances Barnard, Deptford Dockyard
- Laid down: March 1808
- Launched: 8 December 1809
- Commissioned: February 1810
- Fate: Sold, 8 September 1836

General characteristics (as built)
- Class & type: Vengeur-class ship of the line
- Tons burthen: 1,754 (bm)
- Length: 176 ft 5 in (53.8 m) (gundeck)
- Beam: 47 ft 7 in (14.5 m)
- Draught: 17 ft 8 in (5.4 m) (light)
- Depth of hold: 21 ft (6.4 m)
- Sail plan: Full-rigged ship
- Complement: 590
- Armament: 74 muzzle-loading, smoothbore guns; Gundeck: 28 × 32 pdr guns; Upper deck: 28 × 18 pdr guns; Quarterdeck: 4 × 12 pdr guns + 10 × 32 pdr carronades; Forecastle: 2 × 12 pdr guns + 2 × 32 pdr carronades

HMS Rodney was a 74-gun third rate Vengeur-class ship of the line built for the Royal Navy in the first decade of the 19th century. Completed in 1810, she played a minor role in the Napoleonic Wars. She sometimes served as a flagship.

The Dockyard was suffering from a shortage of seasoned timber at the time Rodney was being built. In consequence the hull was built from unseasoned wood which quickly shrank and rotted when exposed to seawater. After just three years at sea all of the hull fastenings had given way and Rodney was returned to Deptford for decommissioning.

In 1827 she was reduced to a 50-gun ship, and in 1836 Rodney was sold out of the Navy.

In commercial service, Rodney collided with the British paddle steamer Thames at Havana, Cuba, on 11 October 1846, destroying her pinnace, and was driven ashore.
