= HMS Egmont (1810) =

Vengeur-class ship of the line

- Egmont

History

United Kingdom
- Name: Egmont
- Ordered: 13 July 1807
- Builder: Thomas Pitcher, Northfleet
- Laid down: October 1807
- Launched: 7 March 1810
- Commissioned: May 1811
- Reclassified: As a storeship, January 1863
- Fate: Sold, 2 January 1875

General characteristics (as built)
- Class & type: Vengeur-class ship of the line
- Tons burthen: 1,760 19/94 (bm)
- Length: 176 ft 2 in (53.7 m) (gundeck)
- Beam: 47 ft 9 in (14.6 m)
- Draught: 17 ft 8 in (5.4 m) (light)
- Depth of hold: 21 ft (6.4 m)
- Sail plan: Full-rigged ship
- Complement: 590
- Armament: 74 muzzle-loading, smoothbore guns; Gundeck: 28 × 32 pdr guns; Upper deck: 28 × 18 pdr guns; Quarterdeck: 4 × 12 pdr guns + 10 × 32 pdr carronades; Forecastle: 2 × 12 pdr guns + 2 × 32 pdr carronades

HMS Egmont was a 74-gun third rate Vengeur-class ship of the line built for the Royal Navy in the first decade of the 19th century. Commissioned in 1811, she played a minor role in the Napoleonic Wars during which she often served as a flagship. The ship was hulked in 1861 and then converted into a storeship. Egmont was sold for scrap in 1875.

(Note: A first-class share was worth £167 11s 3¼d; a sixth-class share, that of an ordinary seaman, was worth £1 12s 5¼d.)

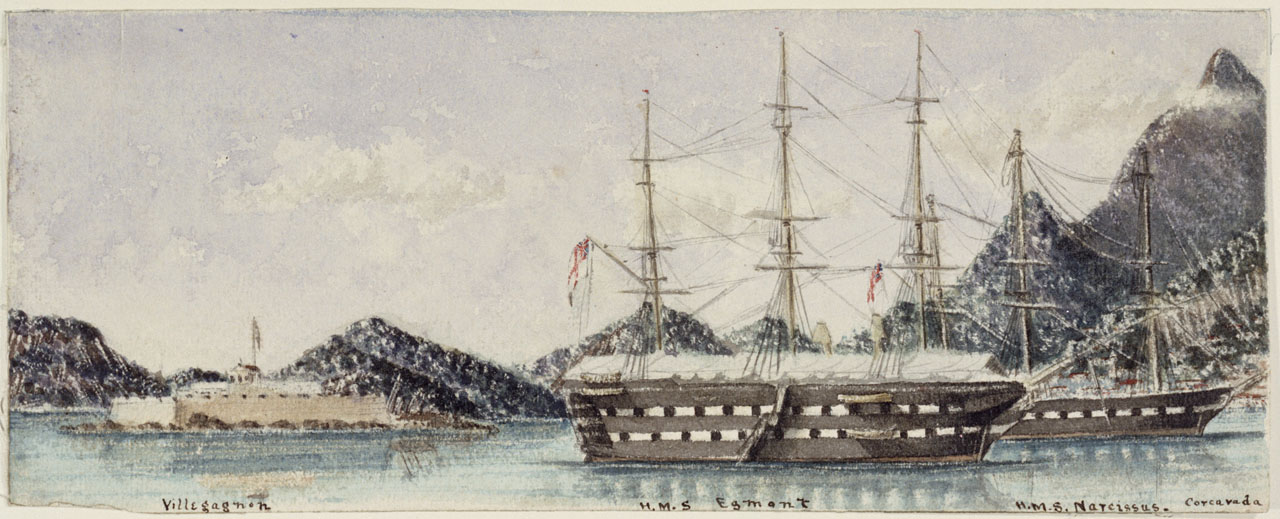
Egmont and HMS Narcissus at the Fort on Villegagnon Island, Rio de Janeiro

In January 1819, the London Gazette reported that Parliament had voted a grant to all those who had served under the command of Lord Viscount Keith in 1812, between 1812 and 1814, and in the Gironde. Egmont was listed among the vessels that had served under Keith in the Gironde. (Note: The sum of the two tranches of payment for that service was £272 8s 5d for a first-class share; the amount for a sixth-class share was £3 3s 5d.)

She was converted to serve as a storeship in 1862, and was sold out of the Navy in 1875.
