= HMS Anson (1812) =

Vengeur-class ship of the line

- Line drawing of Anson

History

United Kingdom
- Name: Anson
- Ordered: 2 November 1807
- Builder: Thomas Steemson, Paull
- Laid down: March 1808
- Launched: 11 May 1812
- Fate: Broken up, 1852

General characteristics (as built)
- Class & type: Vengeur-class ship of the line
- Tons burthen: 1,742 (bm)
- Length: 1,754 ft 5 in (534.7 m) (gundeck)
- Beam: 48 ft 4 in (14.7 m)
- Draught: 17 ft 6 in (5.3 m) (light)
- Depth of hold: 21 ft (6.4 m)
- Sail plan: Full-rigged ship
- Complement: 590
- Armament: 74 muzzle-loading, smoothbore guns; Gundeck: 28 × 32 pdr guns; Upper deck: 28 × 18 pdr guns; Quarterdeck: 4 × 12 pdr guns + 10 × 32 pdr carronades; Forecastle: 2 × 12 pdr guns + 2 × 32 pdr carronades

HMS Anson was a 74-gun third rate Vengeur-class ship of the line built for the Royal Navy in the first decade of the 19th century. Completed in 1812, she was immediately placed in ordinary and was never commissioned.

She was placed on harbour service in 1839, then transported 499 male convicts to Hobart in 1844. For the next seven years, she served as a probation ship for female convicts in Hobart, before ultimately being broken up there in 1851.

== See also ==
- Brickfields Hiring Depot
