= HMS Rippon (1812) =

Vengeur-class ship of the line

- Plan drawing showing a part midship cross-section for Rippon

History

United Kingdom
- Name: Rippon
- Ordered: 2 November 1807
- Builder: Richard Blake & John Scott, Bursledon
- Laid down: October 1808
- Launched: 8 August 1812
- Commissioned: March 1813
- Fate: Broken up, March 1821

General characteristics (as built)
- Class & type: Vengeur-class ship of the line
- Tons burthen: 1,770 (bm)
- Length: 176 ft 4 in (53.7 m) (gundeck)
- Beam: 47 ft 10 in (14.6 m)
- Draught: 17 ft 9 in (5.4 m) (light)
- Depth of hold: 21 ft (6.4 m)
- Sail plan: Full-rigged ship
- Complement: 590
- Armament: 74 muzzle-loading, smoothbore guns; Gundeck: 28 × 32 pdr guns; Upper deck: 28 × 18 pdr guns; Quarterdeck: 4 × 12 pdr guns + 10 × 32 pdr carronades; Forecastle: 2 × 12 pdr guns + 2 × 32 pdr carronades

HMS Rippon was a 74-gun third rate Vengeur-class ship of the line built for the Royal Navy in the first decade of the 19th century. Completed in 1813, she played a minor role in the Napoleonic Wars. She was broken up in 1821.

== Career ==
Capture of Weser: On 30 September 1813, the French frigate Weser, under the command of capitaine de vaisseau Cantzlaat, Chevalier de l'Ordre Impérial de la Réunion, sailed from the Texel for the North Sea. There she captured two Swedish ships before a gale on 16 October took away her main and mizzen mast. Two days later HMS Scylla, Commander Colin Macdonald, captain, encountered her 60 leagues west of Ushant, making her way towards Brest under jury main and mizzen masts. Rather than engage her and risk being crippled and so unable to follow her given the weather, Macdonald decided to follow her.

Fortuitously, on 20 October, HMS Royalist, Commander J.J. Gordon Bremer, captain, arrived and Macdonald and Bremer decided to attack Weser. They engaged her for about an hour and a half before they had to withdraw to repair their rigging. At about this time a third British vessel, Rippon, Captain Christopher Cole, came up. Bremer joined Cole and informed him of the situation while Scylla remained with Weser.

The next morning, as Rippon and Royalist sailed towards Scylla to renew their attack, Weser sailed towards Rippon and struck, after first firing two broadsides towards Scylla. Scylla suffered only two men wounded in the entire engagement. Royalist suffered more heavily, having two men killed and nine wounded. Weser lost four men killed and 15 wounded.

Rippon took Weser's crew on board as prisoners and towed her into port. The Royal Navy took her into service as HMS Weser. (Note: A first-class share of the prize money was worth £190 1s 3 3/4d; a sixth-class share, that of an ordinary seaman, was worth £1 11s 3d.)

In 1814 Rippon sailed with troops to North America.

== Fate ==
Rippon was paid off into ordinary in August 1814. Two years later she was roofed over. She was broken up in March 1821.

== Notable crew members ==
- John Septimus Roe, midshipman
