= HMS Vigo (1810) =

Vengeur-class ship of the line

- Vigo

History

United Kingdom
- Name: Vigo
- Ordered: 20 October 1806
- Builder: Ross, Rochester
- Laid down: April 1807
- Launched: 21 February 1810
- Commissioned: January 1811
- Fate: Broken up, 1865

General characteristics (as built)
- Class & type: Vengeur-class ship of the line
- Tons burthen: 1,786 71/94 (bm)
- Length: 176 ft 9 in (53.9 m) (gundeck)
- Beam: 40 ft (12.2 m)
- Draught: 17 ft 6 in (5.3 m) (light)
- Depth of hold: 20 ft 11 in (6.4 m)
- Sail plan: Full-rigged ship
- Complement: 590
- Armament: 74 muzzle-loading, smoothbore guns; Gundeck: 28 × 32 pdr guns; Upper deck: 28 × 18 pdr guns; Quarterdeck: 4 × 12 pdr guns + 10 × 32 pdr carronades; Forecastle: 2 × 12 pdr guns + 2 × 32 pdr carronades

HMS Vigo was a 74-gun third rate Vengeur-class ship of the line built for the Royal Navy in the first decade of the 19th century. Completed in 1810, she played a minor role in the Napoleonic Wars. launched on 21 February 1810 at Rochester.

She became a receiving ship in 1827, and was broken up in 1865.

HMS Vigo is one of the few but significant number of ships to have been built by a shipyard owned by a woman. A Mrs Mary Ross was the widow of the former owner of Acorn Warf at Rochester. She was evidently successful in the business and would go on to build a further 8 vessels for the Royal Navy, including one other 74-gun ship, HMS Stirling Castle.
