= HMS Conquestador (1810) =

Vengeur-class ship of the line

- Plan drawing of Conquestadore

History

United Kingdom
- Name: Conquestador
- Ordered: 20 October 1806
- Builder: Robert Guillaume, Northam
- Laid down: August 1807
- Launched: 1 August 1810
- Commissioned: September 1810
- Fate: Sold, 10 May 1897

General characteristics (as built)
- Class & type: Vengeur-class ship of the line
- Tons burthen: 1,773 25/94 (bm)
- Length: 176 ft 4 in (53.7 m) (gundeck)
- Beam: 47 ft 11 in (14.6 m)
- Draught: 17 ft 6 in (5.3 m) (light)
- Depth of hold: 21 ft 1 in (6.4 m)
- Sail plan: Full-rigged ship
- Complement: 590
- Armament: 74 muzzle-loading, smoothbore guns; Gundeck: 28 × 32 pdr guns; Upper deck: 28 × 18 pdr guns; Quarterdeck: 4 × 12 pdr guns + 10 × 32 pdr carronades; Forecastle: 2 × 12 pdr guns + 2 × 32 pdr carronades

HMS Conquestador was a 74-gun third rate Vengeur-class ship of the line built for the Royal Navy in the first decade of the 19th century. Completed in 1810, she played a minor role in the Napoleonic Wars. launched on 1 August 1810 at Northam.

She was cut down to a 50-gun ship in 1827, and hulked in 1860. Conquestador was sold out of the Navy in 1897.

== Bibliography ==
- Colledge, J. J.; Warlow, Ben & Bush, Steve (2020). Ships of the Royal Navy: The Complete Record of all Fighting Ships of the Royal Navy from the 15th Century to the Present (5th revised and updated ed.). Seaforth Publishing. ISBN 978-1-5267-9327-0.
- Lavery, Brian (1984). The Ship of the Line. Vol. 1: The Development of the Battlefleet 1650-1850. Naval Institute Press. ISBN 0-85177-252-8.
- Winfield, Rif (2008). British Warships in the Age of Sail 1793–1817: Design, Construction, Careers and Fates (2nd, revised ed.). Seaforth. ISBN 978-1-84415-717-4.
- Winfield, Rif (2014). British Warships in the Age of Sail 1817–1863: Design, Construction, Careers and Fates. Seaforth Publishing. ISBN 978-1-84832-169-4.
