= HMS Agincourt (1817) =

Vengeur-class ship of the line

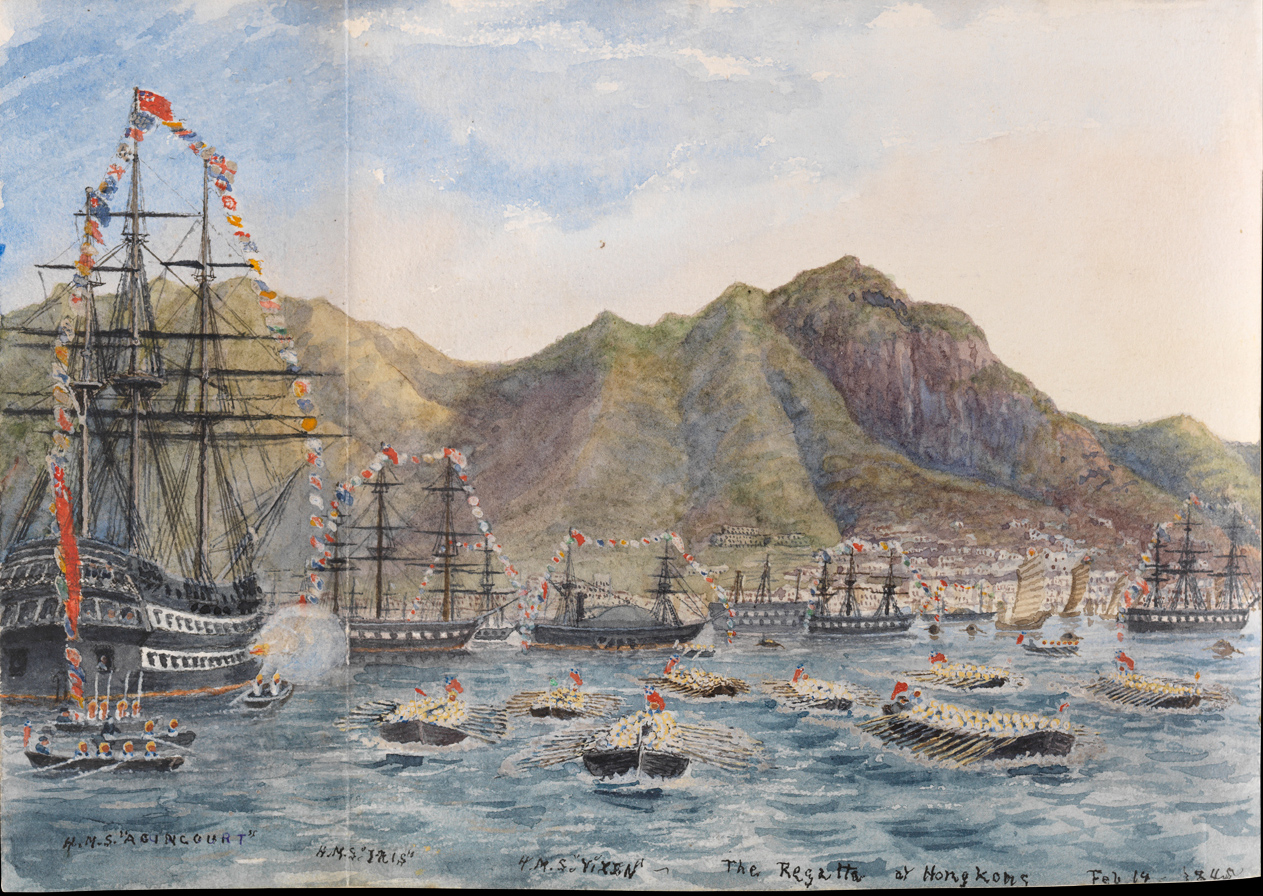
- HMS Agincourt, HMS Iris, HMS Vixen, the regatta at Hong Kong Feb 14, 1845

History

United Kingdom
- Name: Agincourt
- Namesake: Battle of Agincourt
- Ordered: 6 January 1812
- Builder: Plymouth Dockyard
- Laid down: May 1813
- Launched: 19 March 1817
- Completed: April 1817
- Commissioned: February 1842
- Renamed: Vigo, 29 April 1865
- Fate: Sold for scrap, October 1884

General characteristics (as built)
- Class & type: Vengeur-class ship of the line
- Tons burthen: 1,747 7/94 (bm)
- Length: 175 ft 11 in (53.6 m) (gundeck)
- Beam: 48 ft 4 in (14.7 m)
- Draught: 18 ft 3 in (5.6 m) (light)
- Depth of hold: 21 ft (6.4 m)
- Sail plan: Full-rigged ship
- Complement: 590
- Armament: 74 muzzle-loading, smoothbore guns; Gundeck: 28 × 32 pdr guns; Upper deck: 28 × 18 pdr guns; Quarterdeck: 4 × 12 pdr guns + 10 × 32 pdr carronades; Forecastle: 2 × 12 pdr guns + 2 × 32 pdr carronades

HMS Agincourt was a 74-gun third rate Vengeur-class ship of the line built for the Royal Navy in the first decade of the 19th century. Completed in 1817, she was immediately placed in ordinary.

- (January 1840) : Out of commission at Plymouth
- 1 February 1842-May 1845 : Commanded (from commissioning at Plymouth) by Captain Henry William Bruce, flagship of Rear-Admiral Thomas John Cochrane, East Indies
- 6 May 1845 - 4 September 1847 : Commanded by Captain William James Hope Johnstone, flagship of Rear-Admiral Thomas John Cochrane, East Indies
- 28 January 1848 - 31 Mar 1849 : Commanded by Captain William Bowen Mends, depot ship of Ordinary, Devonport
- 24 March 1849 : Commanded by Captain William James Hope Johnstone, depot ship of Ordinary, Devonport
- 1865 : Renamed Vigo

She was placed on harbour service in 1848, and sold out of the Navy in 1884.
