= HMS Stirling Castle (1811) =

Vengeur-class ship of the line

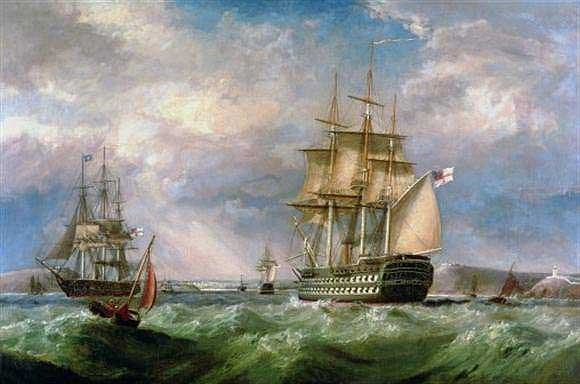
- HMS Stirling Castle entering Cork Harbour, by George Mounsey Wheatley Atkinson

History

United Kingdom
- Name: Stirling Castle
- Ordered: 12 August 1807
- Builder: Mary Ross, Rochester
- Laid down: July 1808
- Launched: 31 December 1811
- Commissioned: March 1812
- Fate: Broken up, 6 September 1861

General characteristics (as built)
- Class & type: Vengeur-class ship of the line
- Tons burthen: 1,774 (bm)
- Length: 176 ft 5 in (53.8 m) (gundeck)
- Beam: 47 ft 11 in (14.6 m)
- Draught: 17 ft 2 in (5.2 m) (light)
- Depth of hold: 21 ft (6.4 m)
- Sail plan: Full-rigged ship
- Complement: 590
- Armament: 74 muzzle-loading, smoothbore guns; Gundeck: 28 × 32 pdr guns; Upper deck: 28 × 18 pdr guns; Quarterdeck: 4 × 12 pdr guns + 10 × 32 pdr carronades; Forecastle: 2 × 12 pdr guns + 2 × 32 pdr carronades

HMS Stirling Castle was a 74-gun third rate Vengeur-class ship of the line built for the Royal Navy in the first decade of the 19th century. Completed in 1812, she played a minor role in the Napoleonic Wars.

Stirling Castle was in company with HMS Cormorant on 11 June 1813. Stirling Castle was sailing to the East Indies and Cormorant was sailing to the Cape of Good Hope. On the way, on 11 June, they boarded Ainsley, Brown, master, which was returning to Liverpool from Africa.

Stirling Castle became a prison ship in 1839. Initially in Plymouth Devonport on 12 October 1844 she was towed, with 250 convicts on board, by tugs Eclair and Rhadamanthus, to Portsmouth Harbour, arriving there on 16 October. She was broken up in 1861.
