= HMS Pitt (1816) =

Vengeur-class ship of the line

- Plan drawing of Pitt

History

United Kingdom
- Name: Pitt
- Ordered: 17 April 1807
- Builder: Portsmouth Dockyard
- Laid down: May 1813
- Launched: 13 April 1816
- Commissioned: Never commissioned
- Reclassified: As a receiving ship and coal hulk, May 1853; As a coal hulk, January 1860
- Fate: Broken up, 17 March 1877

General characteristics (as built)
- Class & type: Vengeur-class ship of the line
- Tons burthen: 1,751 2/94 (bm)
- Length: 176 ft (53.6 m) (gundeck)
- Beam: 47 ft 8 in (14.5 m)
- Draught: 18 ft 3 in (5.6 m) (light)
- Depth of hold: 21 ft (6.4 m)
- Sail plan: Full-rigged ship
- Complement: 590
- Armament: 74 muzzle-loading, smoothbore guns; Gundeck: 28 × 32 pdr guns; Upper deck: 28 × 18 pdr guns; Quarterdeck: 4 × 12 pdr guns + 10 × 32 pdr carronades; Forecastle: 2 × 12 pdr guns + 2 × 32 pdr carronades

HMS Pitt was a 74-gun third rate Vengeur-class ship of the line built for the Royal Navy in the 1810s. Left incomplete after her launching in 1816, she was finally completed in 183, but was never commissioned.

and launched on 13 April 1816 at Portsmouth Dockyard.

She never served any military function.

Pitt was sold for use as a "coal depot" in 1860, sitting In Portsmouth Docks but purely to hold coal brought in by sea from the north to serve the south of England. She was broken up in 1877.
