= HMS Mulgrave =

Vengeur-class ship of the line

- Plan drawing of Mulgrave

History

United Kingdom
- Name: Mulgrave
- Ordered: 23 June 1807
- Builder: John King, Upnor
- Laid down: February 1808
- Launched: 1 January 1812
- Completed: 22 November 1812
- Commissioned: September 1812
- Fate: Broken up, 16 December 1854

General characteristics (as built)
- Class & type: Vengeur-class ship of the line
- Tons burthen: 1,761 71/94 (bm)
- Length: 176 ft 1 in (53.7 m) (gundeck)
- Beam: 47 ft 9 in (14.6 m)
- Draught: 17 ft 8 in (5.4 m) (light)
- Depth of hold: 21 ft (6.4 m)
- Sail plan: Full-rigged ship
- Complement: 590
- Armament: 74 muzzle-loading, smoothbore guns; Gundeck: 28 × 32 pdr guns; Upper deck: 28 × 18 pdr guns; Quarterdeck: 4 × 12 pdr guns + 10 × 32 pdr carronades; Forecastle: 2 × 12 pdr guns + 2 × 32 pdr carronades

HMS Mulgrave was a 74-gun third rate Vengeur-class ship of the line built for the Royal Navy in the first decade of the 19th century. Completed in 1812, she played a minor role in the Napoleonic Wars.

Mulgrave was hulked in 1836, and broken up in 1854.
