= HMS Duncan (1811) =

Vengeur-class ship of the line

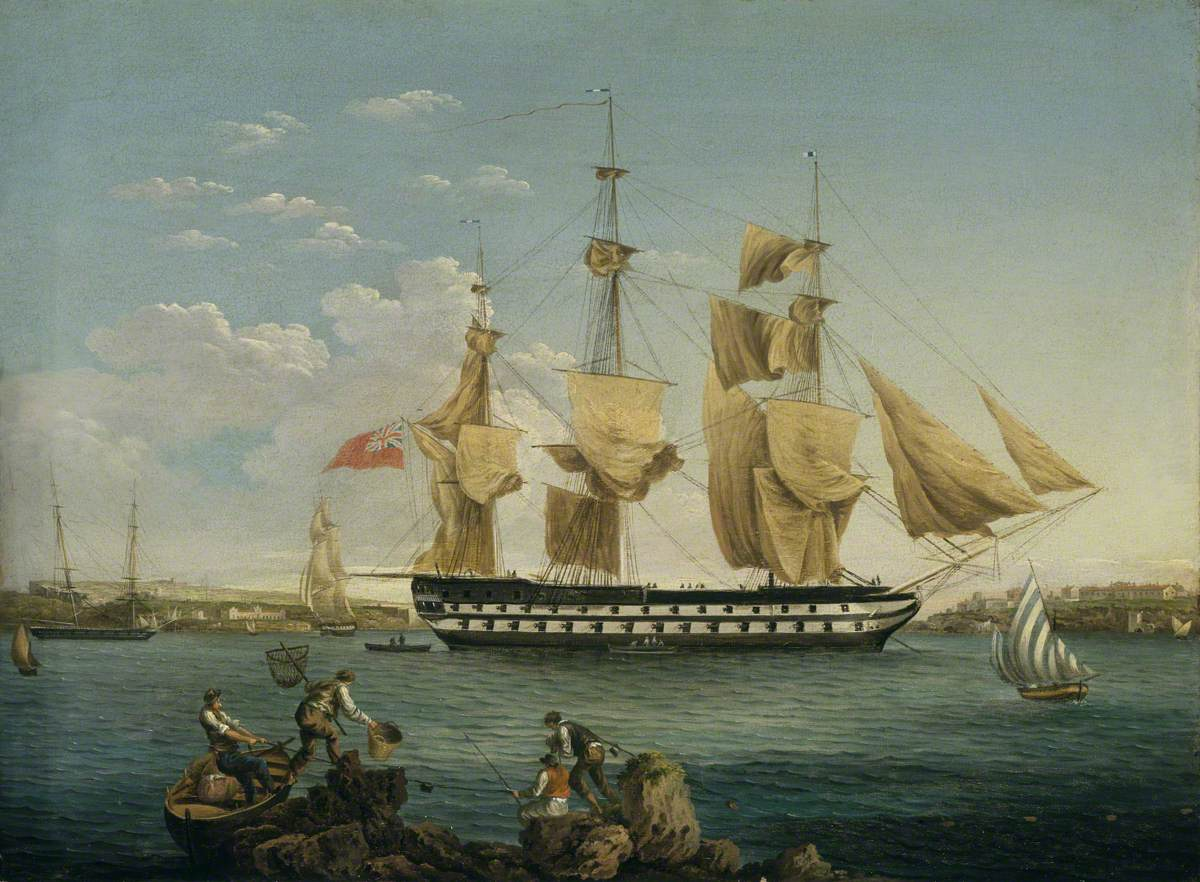
- A painting of HMS Duncan, possibly by William Anderson, date unknown, from the Royal Museums Greenwich

History

United Kingdom
- Name: Duncan
- Ordered: 13 July 1807
- Builder: John Dudman, Deptford Wharf
- Laid down: August 1808
- Launched: 2 December 1811
- Commissioned: February 1812
- Fate: Broken up, 5 October 1863

General characteristics (as built)
- Class & type: Vengeur-class ship of the line
- Tons burthen: 1,761 (bm)
- Length: 176 ft (53.6 m) (gundeck)
- Beam: 47 ft 9 in (14.6 m)
- Draught: 17 ft 6 in (5.3 m) (light)
- Depth of hold: 21 ft (6.4 m)
- Sail plan: Full-rigged ship
- Complement: 590
- Armament: 74 muzzle-loading, smoothbore guns; Gundeck: 28 × 32 pdr guns; Upper deck: 28 × 18 pdr guns; Quarterdeck: 4 × 12 pdr guns + 10 × 32 pdr carronades; Forecastle: 2 × 12 pdr guns + 2 × 32 pdr carronades

HMS Duncan was a 74-gun third rate Vengeur-class ship of the line built for the Royal Navy in the first decade of the 19th century. Completed in 1812, she played a minor role in the Napoleonic Wars.

She was placed on harbour service in 1834, and was broken up in 1863.
