= HMS Devonshire (1812) =

Vengeur-class ship of the line

- Devonshire

History

United Kingdom
- Name: HMS Devonshire
- Ordered: 28 May 1808
- Builder: Barnard, Deptford
- Laid down: October 1810
- Launched: 23 September 1812
- Fate: Broken up, 1869

General characteristics
- Class & type: Vengeur-class ship of the line
- Tons burthen: 1742 bm
- Length: 176 ft (54 m) (gundeck)
- Beam: 47 ft 6 in (14.48 m)
- Depth of hold: 21 ft (6.4 m)
- Propulsion: Sails
- Sail plan: Full-rigged ship
- Armament: 74 guns: Gundeck: 28 × 32 pdrs; Upper gundeck: 28 × 18 pdrs; Quarterdeck: 4 × 12 pdrs, 10 × 32 pdr carronades; Forecastle: 2 × 12 pdrs, 2 × 32 pdr carronades; Poop deck: 6 × 18 pdr carronades

HMS Devonshire was a 74-gun third rate ship of the line of the Royal Navy, launched on 23 September 1812 at Deptford.

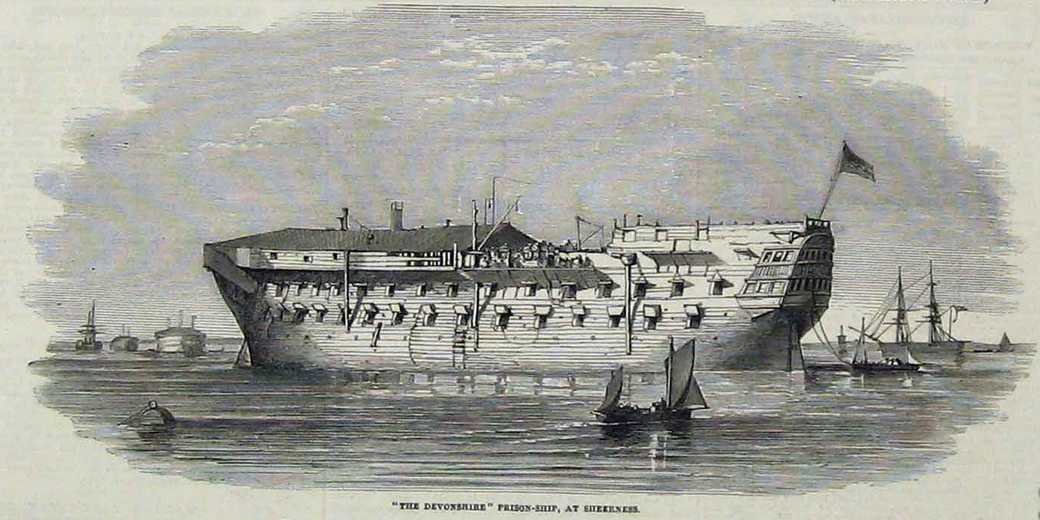
The Devonshire prison-ship, at Sheerness in 1854, holding Russian prisoners of war

She was placed on harbour service in 1849, and was broken up in 1869.
