= Brickfields Hiring Depot =

The Brickfields Hiring Depot was a building located in North Hobart on the site of the current North Hobart Oval. It was completed by the Royal Engineers Department on 1 October 1842 and operated until 1852.

== History ==
Female convicts were held there awaiting hire as probation pass holders from February 1842. Prior to 1844, the Brickfields was used as a place of confinement and punishment just as the Female Factories were. After 1844, the Brickfields was used as a convenience for HMS Anson. It was a reception centre for women discharged from the Anson. These women may have changed or lost their service. This meant that female convicts did not have to return to the Anson for a short period of time while they waited to be re-hired. It was not a Gaol or a Female Factory, but simply a depot for women serving probation.

After its closure in November 1852, Brickfields became an immigration depot and later a pauper establishment.
