= Brian Lavery =

20th- and 21st-century British naval historian

- Born: 18 July 1945 (age 81)

Academic work
- Main interests: Maritime history, Horatio Nelson

Brian Lavery (born 18 July 1945), is a British naval historian, author, and Curator Emeritus at the National Maritime Museum, Greenwich, London, England.

== Biography ==
Lavery was born in Scotland and brought up in Dumbarton. Upon graduating, Lavery worked first as a teacher, then in the printing industry, before gradually fulfilling his interest in maritime heritage as an author, consultant, and curator, building a solid reputation as a highly respected authority in the field. He worked at Chatham Historic Dockyard on the Wooden Walls exhibition. During 14 years in the National Maritime Museum at Greenwich he developed the modern collecting policy and worked on numerous exhibitions such as Seapower, All Hands, and several of the galleries in the Neptune Court development. He has lectured regularly on cruise ships, including many trips on the square rigger Sea Cloud, and he undertakes maritime tours in the United Kingdom and Europe. Traditional Boats & Tall Ships refers to him as "one of the world's leading naval historians." He has since published over 30 books, covering marine architecture, ship construction (including several in Conway's Anatomy of the Ship series), and naval warfare from its infancy to present day. He is a leading expert in the career of Nelson and the broader Royal Navy. Patrick O'Brian found Nelson's Navy (1989) to be "the most nearly regal that I have come across in many years of reading on the subject." The Times labelled the same book a "masterpiece on life in the Senior Service under England's favourite seafaring son."

In addition to editing works such as Deane's Doctrine of Naval Architecture 1670, Lavery produces articles which feature regularly in maritime magazines and journals.

Lavery was a historical consultant on Peter Weir's 2003 blockbuster film Master and Commander: The Far Side of the World, starring Russell Crowe and Paul Bettany. His naval expertise was also utilised "on the replica constructions of Captain Cook's Endeavour and the emigrant ship Susan Constant", the latter being the subject of his 1988 book.

In 2007, Lavery released Churchill Goes to War. In November of the same year, Lady Mountbatten presented Lavery with the Desmond Wettern Maritime Media Award at a ceremony aboard the MV Silver Sturgeon. According to the Maritime Foundation, the award "was made to Mr Lavery as an author, broadcaster, and adviser on major feature films, which have contributed to our understanding of the social structure of Britain's maritime power and all maritime aspects of British national life." The following year, he was awarded the Society for Nautical Research's Anderson Medal.

In 2009, Lavery wrote a The Sunday Times bestselling book to accompany the BBC series Empire of the Seas, presented by Dan Snow, which, as The Sunday Express explains, "looks at the growth off Britain thanks to the Royal Navy, from Drake's defeat of the Armada to the First World War."

== Awards ==
- Society for Nautical Research's Anderson Medal (2008)
- Desmond Wettern Maritime Media Award (2007)

== Bibliography ==
- Ship: 5,000 Years of Maritime Adventure, Dorling Kindersley (2010) ISBN 978-1-4053-5336-6
- Royal Tars of Old England: The Lower Deck of the Royal Navy, 875–1850, Conway Publishing (2010) ISBN 1-84486-125-2
- We Shall Fight on the Beaches, Conway Publishing (2009) ISBN 1-84486-101-5
- Empire of the Seas, Conway Publishing (2009) ISBN 1-84486-109-0
- Assault Landing Craft: Design, Construction and Operations, Seaforth Publishing (2009) ISBN 1-84832-050-7
- Editor of The British Home Guard Pocket-Book, Conway Publishing (2009) ISBN 978-1-84486-106-4
- The Frigate Surprise: The Design, Construction and Careers of Jack Aubrey's Favourite Command, with Geoff Hunt, Conway Publishing (2008) ISBN 1-84486-074-4
- In Which They Served: The Royal Navy Officer Experience in the Second World War, Conway Publishing (2008) ISBN 978-1-84486-070-8
- Churchill Goes to War: Winston's Wartime Journeys, Conway Publishing (2007) ISBN 1-84486-055-8
- The Royal Navy Officer's Pocket-book, 1944, Conway Publishing (2007) ISBN 1-84486-054-X
- Life in Nelson's Navy, The Sutton Life Series, The History Press (2007) ISBN 0-7509-4776-4
- Shield of Empire: The Royal Navy in Scotland, Birlinn Ltd (2007) ISBN 1-84158-513-0
- Churchill's Navy: The Ships, Men and Organisation, 1939–1945, Conway Publishing (2006) ISBN 1-84486-035-3
- Introduction to A Seaman's Pocket-book: June, 1943 – By the Lord Commissioners of the Admiralty, Conway Publishing (2006) ISBN 1-84486-037-X
- Contributor to Nelson: An Illustrated History, with Pieter Van Der Merwe, Roger Morriss and Stephen Deuchar, National Maritime Museum (2005) ISBN 1-85669-061-X
- Hostilities Only: Training the Wartime Royal Navy, National Maritime Museum (2005) ISBN 0-948065-48-6
- The Island Nation: A History of Britain and the Sea, Conway Maritime Press (2005) ISBN 1-84486-016-7
- Nelson's Fleet at Trafalgar, National Maritime Museum (2004/2005) ISBN 1-59114-610-0
- The Line of Battle: Sailing Warships, 1650–1840, Conway Maritime Press (2004) ISBN 0-85177-954-9
- Nelson and the Nile: The Naval War Against Bonaparte 1798, Caxton Editions (2003) ISBN 1-84067-522-5
- Horatio Lord Nelson, British Library Historic Lives (2003) ISBN 0-7123-4801-8
- Jack Aubrey Commands: An Historical Companion to the Naval World of Patrick O'Brian, with Peter Weir, Conway Maritime Press (2003) ISBN 0-85177-946-8
- Maritime Scotland, Batsford Ltd (2001) ISBN 0-7134-8520-5
- Shipboard Life and Organisation, 1731–1815, Ashgate Publishing Ltd (1999) ISBN 1-84014-228-6
- Ship Models: Their Purpose and Development from 1650 to the Present, with Simon Stephens, Philip Wilson Publishers Ltd (1995) ISBN 978-0-302-00654-2
- Marine Architecture: Directions for Carrying on a Ship, Scholars Facsimiles & Reprint (1993) ISBN 0-8201-1481-2
- Building the Wooden Walls: The Design and Construction of the 74 Gun Ship Valiant, Conway Maritime Press (1991) ISBN 0-85177-579-9
- Nelson's Navy: The Ships, Men and Organisation, 1793–1815, Conway Maritime Press (1989) ISBN 0-85177-521-7
- Royal Navy's first "Invincible": The Ship, the Wreck and the Recovery, Invincible Conservations (1988) ISBN 0-9513812-0-2
- The Arming and Fitting of English Ships of War, 1600–1815, Conway Maritime Press (1988) ISBN 0-87021-009-2
- The Colonial Merchantman Susan Constant 1605, Conway Maritime Press (1988) ISBN 0-85177-489-X
- Doctrine of Naval Architecture, 1670, with Anthony Deane, Conway Maritime Press (1986) ISBN 0-85177-180-7
- The Ship of the Line: Design, Construction and Fittings, Volume II, Conway Maritime Press (1986/1997) ISBN 0-85177-287-0
- The 74-Gun Ship Bellona, Conway Maritime Press (1985) ISBN 0-85177-368-0
- The Ship of the Line: Development of the Battlefleet, 1650–1850, Volume I, Conway Maritime Press (1983) ISBN 0-85177-252-8
