= Demi-cannon =

Type of muzzle-loading cannon

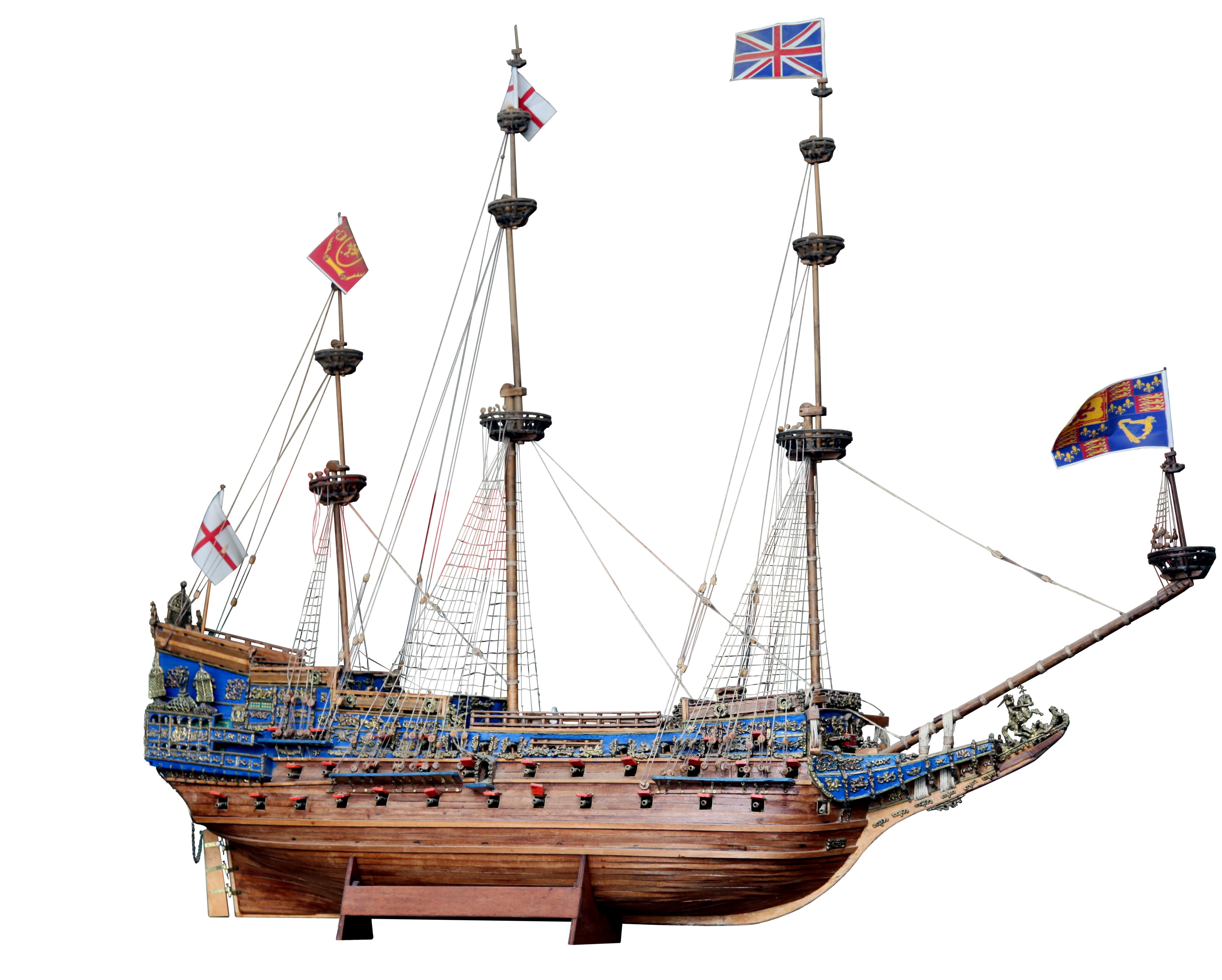
Sovereign of the Seas, whose armament included eight demi-cannons

The demi-cannon was a medium-sized cannon, similar to but slightly larger than a culverin and smaller than a regular 42 pounds (19 kg) cannon, developed in the early 17th century. A full cannon fired a 42-pound shot, but these were discontinued in the 18th century as they were seen as too unwieldy. The lower tiers of 18th century English warships were usually equipped with demi-cannons.

Ships featuring demi-cannons included Sovereign of the Seas, Resolution and James, which fought in the Anglo-Dutch naval wars. Demi-cannons were also used on HMS Stirling Castle, the wreck of which was discovered in the Goodwin Sands. Several examples of this weapon were recovered from the site.

The barrels of demi-cannon were typically 11 feet (3.4 m) long, had a calibre of 6 inches (150 mm) and could weigh up to 5,600 pounds (2,500 kg). It required 18 pounds (8.2 kg) of black powder to fire a 32 pounds (15 kg) round shot. The demi-cannon had an effective range of 1,600 feet (490 m).

These 32-pounders were used during the 18th century on first-rate ships of the line which carried up to 100 guns. Though powerful, the naval demi-cannons were inaccurate, except at close range, which allowed warships to cause as much damage as possible. Sometimes a single broadside was enough to cripple the enemy vessel.

== Sources ==
- Colledge, J. J.; Warlow, Ben (2006) [1969]. Ships of the Royal Navy: The Complete Record of All Fighting Ships of the Royal Navy from the 15th Century to the Present (3rd Rev ed.). London: Chatham Publishing. ISBN 978-1-86176-281-8. OCLC 67375475.
- Lavery, Brian (1983). The Ship of the Line. Vol. 1: The Development of the Battlefleet 1650–1850. Conway Maritime Press. ISBN 978-0-85177-252-3.
- Manucy, Albert (1949). Artillery Through the Ages: A Short Illustrated History of Cannon, Emphasizing Types Used in America. Washington: US Government. OCLC 631730859.
