= 12-pounder long gun =

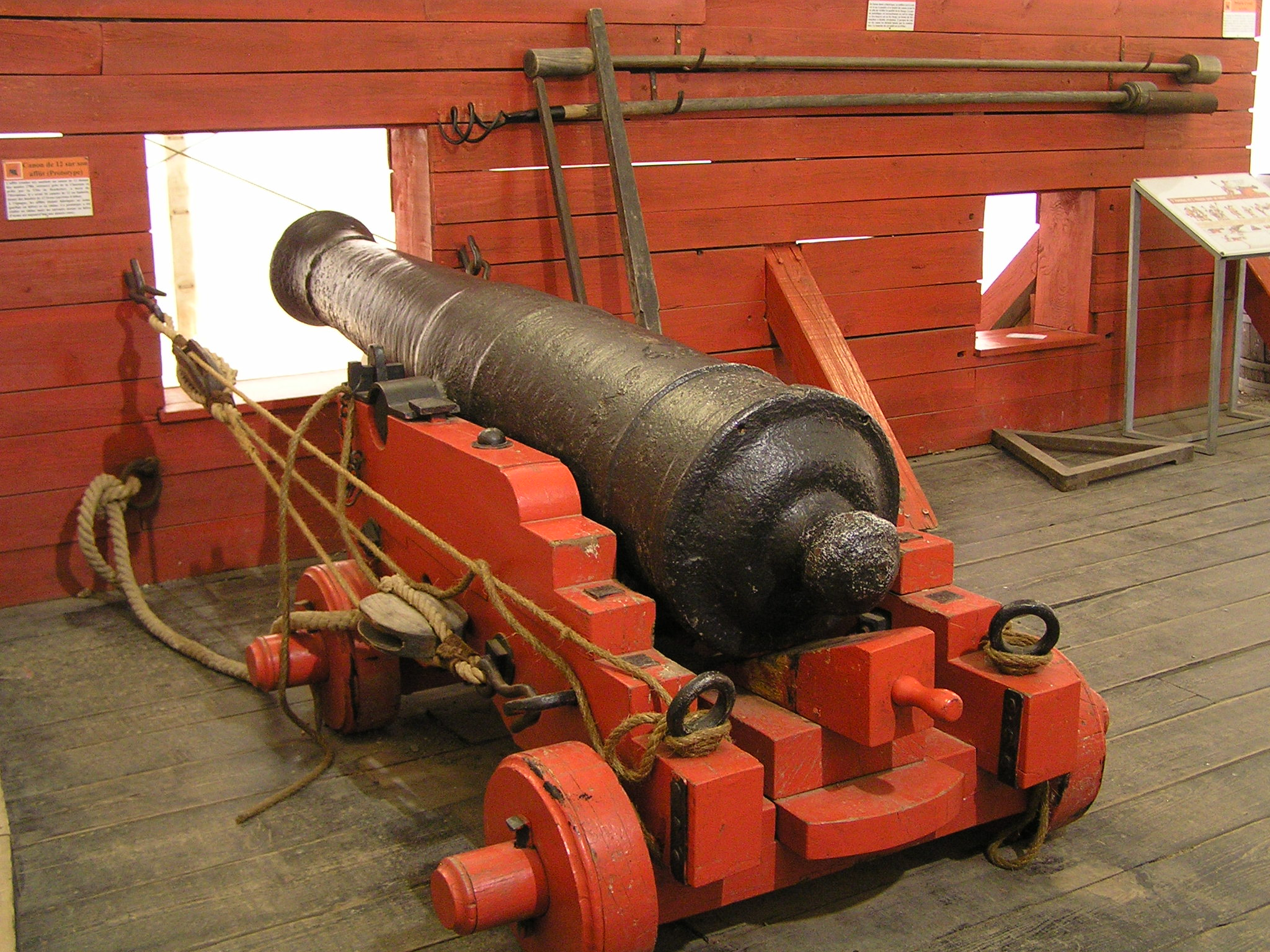
- Reproduction of a 12-pounder long gun aboard Hermione (only partially rigged).
- Type: naval gun

Service history
- Used by: France, Spain, Great Britain, Dutch Republic, Sweden, United States, Mysore

Specifications
- Mass: 1,470 kg 275 kg (mount)
- Barrel length: 2.430 metres
- Shell weight: 5.8 kg
- Calibre: 120.7 mm

The 12-pounder long gun was an intermediary calibre piece of artillery mounted on warships of the Age of Sail. They were used as main guns on the most typical frigates of the early 18th century, on the second deck of fourth-rate ships of the line, and on the upper decks or castles of 80-gun and 120-gun ships of the line. Naval 12-pounders were similar to 12-pound Army guns in the Gribeauval system: the canon lourd de 12 Gribeauval, used as a siege weapon, and the canon de 12 Gribeauval, which was considered a heavy field artillery piece.

== Usage ==
As the 12-pounder calibre was consistent with both the French and the British calibre systems, it was a widespread gun amongst nations between the 17th and the 19th century. From the late 18th century, the French Navy used the 12-pounder in three capacities: as main gun on early frigates under Louis XIV, on standard frigates under Louis XV and on light frigates under Louis XVI; as secondary artillery on 64-gun ships; to arm the castles of 80-gun ships of the line; and to equip the third deck of early first-rate ships.

Under Louis XIV, frigates were organised into "first-rank frigates", which were small two-deckers comparable in role to the 60-gun ships of the 19th century, and smaller "second-rank" frigates. The first-rank frigates carried the 12-pounder as main artillery on their lower deck. Later, under Louis XV, the frigate took its modern shape with a single artillery deck complemented by smaller pieces on the castles; new heavy frigates were developed to carry 26 12-pounders, with Hermione as the lead ship of the series. Hermione was captured by the British in 1757 and was swiftly imitated. A breakthrough towards fielding heavier guns was made in 1772, when the two units of the Pourvoyeuse class were built, with 24-pounders intended, but 18-pounders used in practice, and the 12-pounder remained the standard issue on most units. Under Louis XVI, the heavier 18-pounder frigate became predominant, with over 130 units produced, but the French Navy still had around 70 lighter 12-pounder frigates in commission.

On 64-gun two-deckers, the 12-pounder was used as secondary artillery, to supplement the 24-pounder main batteries. 28 guns were carried on the top gun-deck.

Larger units used the 12-pounder to complement the firepower provided by their main and secondary artillery. On 80-gun ships of the Tonnant class and Bucentaure class, they armed the forecastle and the poop deck. On capital ships, the 12-pounder was used on the third deck from the reign of Louis XIV, with units like Royal Louis or Soleil Royal as typical examples. While the secondary artillery of these 100-gun ships evolved from 18-pounders to 24-pounders, the 12-pounder remained the standard gun on the third deck until 1803, when the Océan-class ship Impérial became the first 120-gun to carry 18-pounders on her third battery.

In the Royal Navy, the 12-pounder was used in a similar capacity. The capture of Hermione in 1757 encouraged the British to imitate her design, yielding the Southampton and Richmond-class frigates. The 12-pounder also equipped the castles on razeed ships, where 12 pieces were mounted, and the 22-gun secondary battery of 50-gun fourth-rates. Finally, 30 were installed on the third deck of 90-gun second-rates.

12-pounder long guns
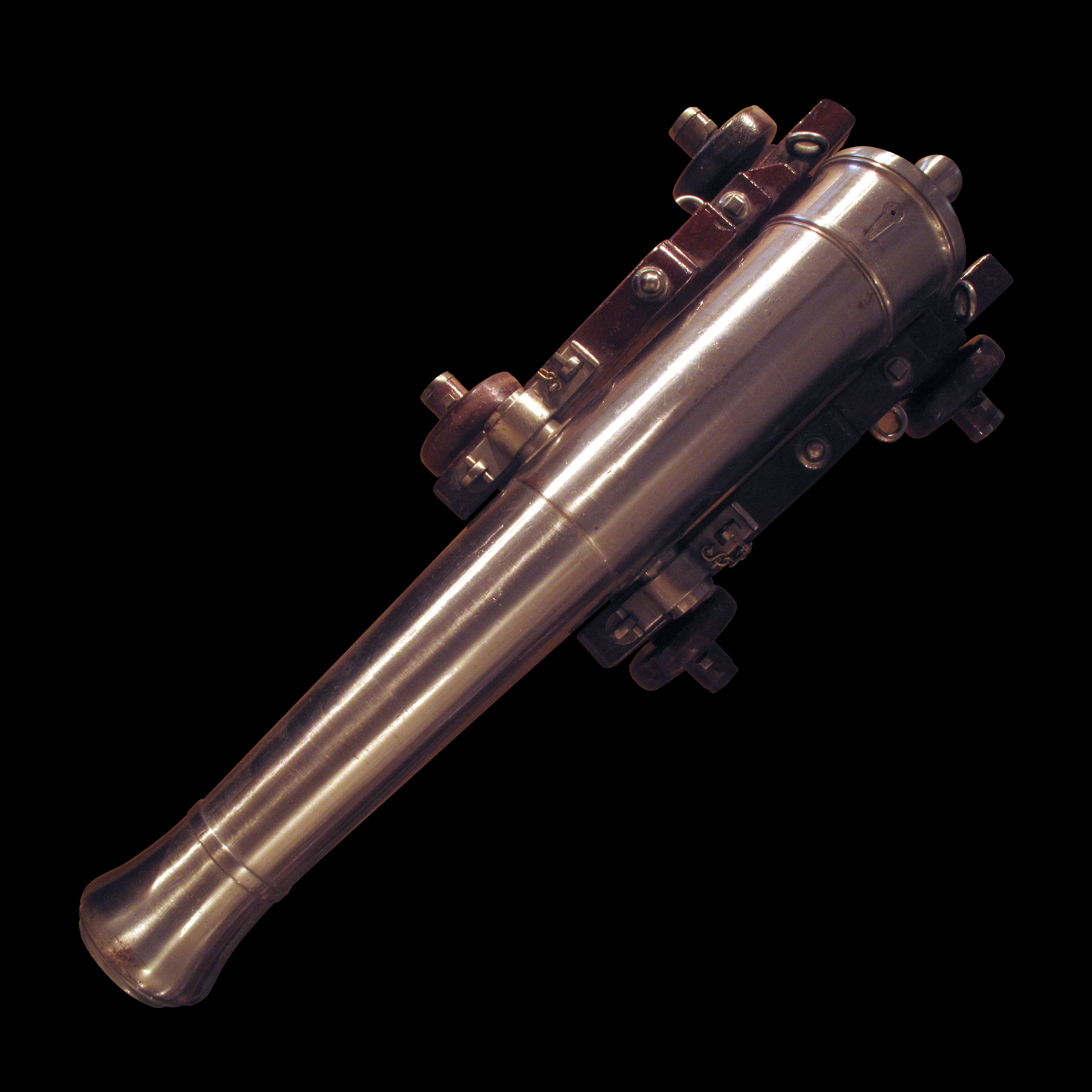
View from above of a 1/6th model (without rigging)

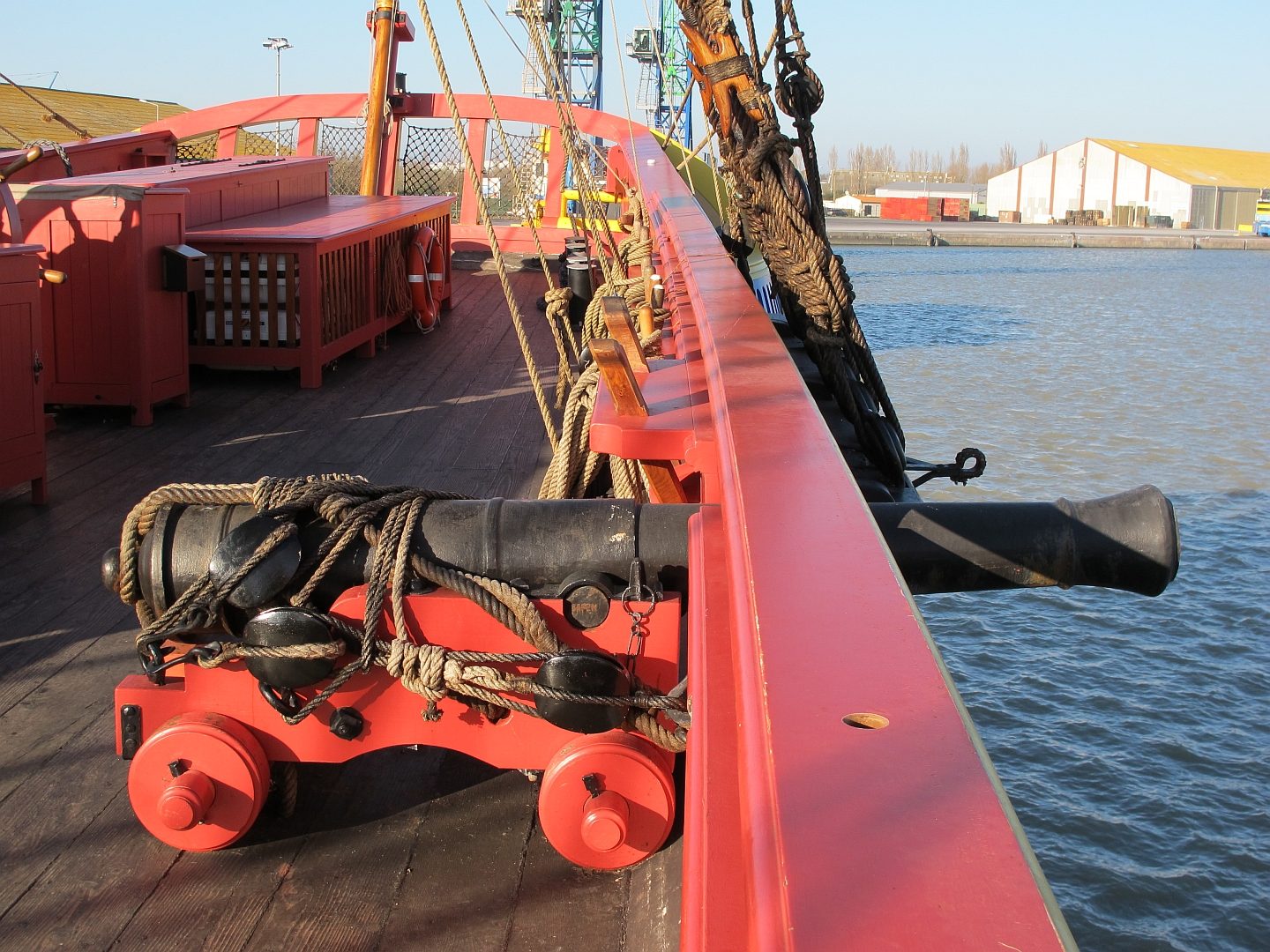
Profile view of a reproduction aboard Hermione, including the elaborate rigging

== British iron 12-pounders ==
=== Early iron 12-pounders ===
James mentions 4 12-pounder iron guns in the 1720s. Their length varied from 8 1/2 ft (2.6 m) to 10 ft (3.0 m), in 6 in (0.15 m) increments. 24 guns from the reigns of Queen Anne and King George I survive at Fort Prince of Wales in Hudson bay. They are either 9 1/2 ft long weighing between 33 1/2 and 35 cwt, 9 ft long weighing between 32 and 33 1/2 cwt, or 8 ft long weighing 33 1/4 cwt. The mensuration of 1743 gives the weight of the 9 ft 12-pounder gun as 32 hundredweight 2 quarter 3 pounds, and the dimensions there are almost identical with those in Adye's notebook of 1766. In 1780 Walton's notebook mentions, in addition to newer 12-pounders, a 9 1/2 ft gun of 34 hundredweight. The dimensions of this are very similar to those of Armstrong's construction in the early 1700s. Based on these sources, the iron 12-pounders in the early 1700s had the following specifications:

Gun Length (ft)	Weight (cwt)	Notes
10	?	
9 1/2	34	Based on Walton's notebook in 1780
9	32 1/2, 3 lb	Based on mensuration of 1743
8 1/2	?	
8	33 1/4	Based only on a single gun from Fort Prince of Wales

The establishment of 1764 specifies 3 types of iron 12-pounder guns:

Gun Length (ft)	Weight (cwt)
9	32 1/2
8 1/2	31 1/2
7 1/2	29 1/4

Walton gives dimensions for these guns in his 1780 notebook, and where known, they are very similar to the earlier guns, with only minor differences.

=== Blomefield's 12-pounders ===
Sir Thomas Blomefield developed several iron 12-pounders as part of his system of gun construction from the 1790s onward:

Gun Length (ft)	Weight (cwt)	Method of construction	Uses (as of 1825)
9	34 3/4	newly cast	chase guns, line of battle ships, garrison
8 1/2	33 1/4	newly cast	garrison service, battering train
7 1/2	29 1/4	newly cast	quarter deck, line of battle ships, garrison
6	24	newly cast	Not used, sometimes bored-up to 24-pounder 22 cwt
6	21	newly cast	Sometimes bored-up to 24-pounder 21 cwt

Both guns of 6 ft were intended exclusively for the land service, and by 1857 the gun of 6 ft 21 hundredweight was the only one mounted in service, presumably in the defense of ditches. The gun of 8 1/2 ft 33 1/4 hundredweight was recommended for siege trains in 1844, as it could dismount artillery while requiring less weight of ammunition and powder than an 18- or 24-pounder gun. At the same time, the gun of 9 ft 34 3/4 hundredweight was recommended for sometimes replacing the 18-pounder in batteries where quick fire was required against storming parties or boat attacks. After the 1820s, the development of larger guns meant the iron 12-pounder declined in use, and in 1859 the Committee on Ordnance recommended that all iron 12-pounders except the gun of 6 ft be declared obsolete. In 1865 though, the guns of 9 and 8 1/2 ft were retained while all others were declared obsolete.

== Sources and references ==
- (in French) Jean Boudriot et Hubert Berti, L'Artillerie de mer : marine française 1650-1850, Paris, éditions Ancre, 1992 (ISBN 2-903179-12-3) (notice BNF no FRBNF355550752).
- (in French) Jean Peter, L'artillerie et les fonderies de la marine sous Louis XIV, Paris, Economica, 1995, 213 p. (ISBN 2-7178-2885-0).
