= List of ship launches in 1812 =

The list of ship launches in 1812 includes a chronological list of some ships launched in 1812.

Date	Ship	Class	Builder	Location	Country	Notes
1 January	Mulgrave	Vengeur-class ship of the line	John King	Upnor	United Kingdom	For Royal Navy.
1 January	Sceptre	Merchantman	Gibson	Hull	United Kingdom	For Messrs. James Featherstone and Son.
3 January	Apollo	Merchantman	Thomas Steemson	Paull	United Kingdom	For John Staniforth.
7 January	Égyptienne	Licorne-class Fluyt		La Ciotat	France	For French Navy.
16 January	Cornwall	Vengeur-class ship of the line	Frances Barnard	Deptford	United Kingdom	For Royal Navy.
30 January	Princess Charlotte of Wales	East Indiaman	Dudman	Deptford	United Kingdom	For British East India Company.
January	Le Jean Bart	Privateer		Marseille	France	For private owner.
13 February	Broxbornebury	Full-rigged ship	Smith, Timbrell & Co.	Northfleet	United Kingdom	For British East India Company.
13 February	Dublin	Vengeur-class ship of the line	Samuel Brent	Rotherhithe	United Kingdom	For Royal Navy.
14 February	Chatham	Third rate		Woolwich Dockyard	United Kingdom	For Royal Navy.
23 February	Agamemnon	Téméraire-class ship of the line		Genoa	France	For French Navy.
26 February	Terpsichore	Pallas-class frigate	Pierre Jacques Guillaume Lair	Antwerp	France	For French Navy.
27 February	Gloucester	Vengeur-class ship of the line	Thomas Pitcher	Northfleet	United Kingdom	For Royal Navy.
28 February	Pallas	Brig		Kirkwall	United Kingdom	For Thomas and William Trails.
25 March	Érigone	Pallas-class frigate	Pierre Jacques Guillaume Lair	Antwerp	France	For French Navy.
29 March	Scarborough	Vengeur-class ship of the line	Joseph Graham	Harwich	United Kingdom	For Royal Navy.
March	Grecian	Schooner	Thomas Kemp	Baltimore, Maryland	United States	For Isaac McKim.
10 April	Tenedos	Fifth rate	Sir Robert Seppings	Chatham Dockyard	United Kingdom	For Royal Navy.
11 April	Aréthuse	Pallas-class frigate	Mathurin Crucy	Nantes	France	For French Navy.
11 April	Briton	Leda-class frigate		Chatham Dockyard	United Kingdom	For Royal Navy.
11 April	Clarence	Vengeur-class ship of the line	Isaac Blackburn	Turnchapel	United Kingdom	For Royal Navy.
13 April	Lady Hannah Ellice	West Indiaman	Edward Adams	Bucklers Hard	United Kingdom	For Chalmers & Co.
13 April	Nymphe	Fifth rate	George Parsons	Bursledon	United Kingdom	For Royal Navy.
14 April	Gaulois	Téméraire-class ship of the line		Antwerp	France	For French Navy.
27 April	Conquérant	Bucentaure-class ship of the line	Pierre Jacques Guillaume Lair	Antwerp	France	For French Navy.
27 April	Severn	Merchantman	James Bonner & James Horsburgh	Calcutta	India	For private owner.
27 April	Regent	Merchantman	Matthew Smith	Calcutta	India	For James Haig.
27 April	Witham	Schooner	Ramsey	Boston	United Kingdom	For Messrs. Gee & Clark.
27 April	Name unknown	Merchantman	James Fairnie	Burntisland	United Kingdom	For private owner.
27 April	Name unknown	Merchantman	James Fairnie	Burntisland	United Kingdom	For private owner.
27 April	Name unknown	Merchantman	James Fairnie	Burntisland	United Kingdom	For private owner.
2 May	Trave	Pallas-class frigate	Jean François Guillemand	Amsterdam	(France) French First Empire	For French Navy.
5 May	Galatée	Pallas-class frigate	Mathurin François Boucher	Genoa	France	For French Navy.
9 May	Jahde	Pallas-class frigate	Alexandre Notaire-Granville	Rotterdam	(France) French First Empire	For French Navy.
11 May	Anson	Vengeur-class ship of the line	Thomas Steemson	Hull	United Kingdom	For Royal Navy.
12 May	Weser	Pallas-class frigate	Jean-François Guillemand	Amsterdam	(France) French First Empire	For French Navy.
17 May	Melpomène	Pallas-class frigate	François-Fréderic Poncet	Toulon	France	For French Navy.
25 May	Nimrod	Cruizer-class brig-sloop	Jabez Bayley	Ipswich	United Kingdom	For Royal Navy.
25 May	Rubis	Pallas-class frigate	Antoine Crucy	Nantes	France	For French Navy.
26 May	Bengal Merchant	Merchantman	Anthony Blackmore	Howrah	India	For Sedgewicke & Hearne.
26 May	Ems	Pallas-class frigate	Alexandre Notaire-Granville	Rotterdam	(France) French First Empire	For French Navy.
27 May	Curlew	Cruizer-class brig-sloop	William Good & Co.	Bridport	United Kingdom	For Royal Navy.
31 May	Romulus	Téméraire-class ship of the line		Toulon	France	For French Navy.
May	Wear	Brig or snow	Hutchinson & Brown	Sunderland	United Kingdom	For T. Hudson.
4 June	Poluks	Fifth rate	B. F. Stoke	Saint Petersburg	Russia	For Imperial Russian Navy.
9 June	Maksim Ispovednik	Anapa-class ship of the line	M. K. Surovtsov	Kherson	Russia	For Imperial Russian Navy.
11 June	Fairy	Cruizer-class brig-sloop	William Taylor	Bideford	United Kingdom	For Royal Navy.
18 June	Neptunus	Trekh Sviatitelei-class ship of the line	I. S. Razumov	Saint Petersburg	Russia	For Imperial Russian Navy.
24 June	Atalante	Pallas-class frigate	Antoine Nicholas François Bonjean	Lorient	France	For French Navy.
26 June	Bold	Bold-class gun-brig	Tyson & Blake	Bursledon	United Kingdom	For Royal Navy.
27 June	Cleopatra	Brig	Syme & Co	Leith	United Kingdom	For private owner.
27 June	Pembroke	Vengeur-class ship of the line	Wigram, Wells & Green	Blackwall Yard	United Kingdom	For Royal Navy.
9 July	Childers	Cruizer-class brig-sloop	Nicholas Diddams	Portsmouth Dockyard	United Kingdom	For Royal Navy.
9 July	Union	Brig	James Hutcheson	Peterhead	United Kingdom	For private owner.
9 July	Wasp	Cruizer-class brig-sloop	Robert Davy	Topsham	United Kingdom	For Royal Navy.
13 July	Manly	Bold-class gun-brig	Thomas Hills	Sandwich	United Kingdom	For Royal Navy.
13 July	Thistle	Bold-class gun-brig	Mary Ross	Rochester	United Kingdom	For Royal Navy.
24 July	Comet	Paddle steamer	John Wood & Co.	Port Glasgow	United Kingdom	For Henry Bell.
25 July	Boxer	Bold-class gun-brig	Tyson & Blake	Bursledon	United Kingdom	For Royal Navy.
25 July	Saracen	Cruizer-class brig-sloop	Bools & Good	Bridport	United Kingdom	For Royal Navy.
25 July	Snap	Bold-class gun-brig	Russel and Son	Lyme Regis	United Kingdom	For Royal Navy.
25 July	Surprise	Leda-class frigate	William Stone	Milford Haven	United Kingdom	For Royal Navy.
27 July	Borer	Bold-class gun-brig	Tyson & Blake	Bursledon	United Kingdom	For Royal Navy.
1 August	Gioacchino	Téméraire-class ship of the line		Castellamare di Stabia	Kingdom of Naples	For Royal Neapolitan Navy.
2 August	Castiglione	Téméraire-class ship of the line	Jean Marguerite Tupinier	Venice	France	For French Navy.
8 August	Magicienne	Apollo-class frigate	Daniel List	Binstead	United Kingdom	For Royal Navy.
8 August	Rippon	Armada-class ship of the line	Richard Blake & John Scott	Bursledon	United Kingdom	For Royal Navy.
8 August	Shamrock	Bold-class gun-brig	Edward Larking	King's Lynn	United Kingdom	For Royal Navy.
10 August	Espeigle	Cruizer-class brig-sloop	Jabez Bayley	Ipswich	United Kingdom	For Royal Navy.
10 August	Wolfe's Cove	Merchantman	Baldwin & Co.	Île d'Orléans	(United Kingdom of Great Britain and Ireland) Upper Canada	For private owner.
12 August	Cérès	Pallas-class frigate		Brest	France	For French Navy.
15 August	Piave	Pallas-class frigate	Jean Marguerite Tupinier	Venice	France	For Royal Italian Navy.
15 August	Piet Hein	Téméraire-class ship of the line		Venice	France	For French Navy.
15 August	Royal Italien	Téméraire-class ship of the line	Fonda	Venice	France	For French Navy.
15 August	Ville de Marseille	Téméraire-class ship of the line		Toulon	France	For French Navy.
22 August	Arab	Cruizer-class brig-sloop	John Pelham	Frindsbury	United Kingdom	For Royal Navy.
24 August	William Dawson	West Indiaman	Brockbank	Lancaster	United Kingdom	For Messrs. Bolton & Littledale.
26 August	Hasty	Bold-class gun-brig	Robert Hill	Sandwich	United Kingdom	For Royal Navy.
August	Benson	Full-rigged ship		Quebec City	(United Kingdom of Great Britain and Ireland) Upper Canada	For private owner.
August	Gowdies	Full-rigged ship		Quebec City	(United Kingdom of Great Britain and Ireland) Upper Canada	For private owner.
August	Mary	Full-rigged ship		Quebec City	(United Kingdom of Great Britain and Ireland) Upper Canada	For private owner.
August	Pelican	Cruizer-class brig-sloop	Robert Davy	Topsham	United Kingdom	For Royal Navy.
7 September	Iupiter	Trekh Sviatitelei-class ship of the line	G. S. Isakov	Saint Petersburg	Russia	For Imperial Russian Navy.
7 September	Minerva	Merchantman	Alexander Syme & Co.	Leith	United Kingdom	For private owner.
8 September	London	West Indiaman	Peter Everitt Mastaer		United Kingdom	For private owner.
23 September	Devonshire	Vengeur-class ship of the line	Barnard	Deptford	United Kingdom	For Royal Navy.
26 September	Conflict	Bold-class gun-brig	William Good	Bridport	United Kingdom	For Royal Navy.
26 September	Stag	Apollo-class frigate	Robert John Nelson	Deptford	United Kingdom	For Royal Navy.
4 October	Dryade	Pallas-class frigate	Mathurin François Boucher	Genoa	France	For French Navy.
5 October	Bridgewater	East Indiaman	Randall, Brent & Gray	Rotherhithe	United Kingdom	For British East India Company.
8 October	Atlas	East Indiaman	Thomas Steemson	Paull	United Kingdom	For British East India Company.
9 October	Satellite	Cruizer-class brig-sloop	Daniel List	Fishbourne	United Kingdom	For Royal Navy.
21 October	Barrosa	Apollo-class frigate	Robert John Nelson	Deptford Dockyard	United Kingdom	For Royal Navy.
22 October	Heron	Cruizer-class brig-sloop	John King	Upnor	United Kingdom	For Royal Navy.
24 October	Contest	Bold-class gun-brig	William Good	Bridport	United Kingdom	For Royal Navy.
October	Minerva	Merchantman		Aberdeen	United Kingdom	For private owner.
6 November	Castle Huntly	East Indiaman	Kyd & Co.	Kidderpore	India	For British East India Company.
6 November	Hinchinbroke	Packet ship	Bligh	Falmouth	United Kingdom	For Post Office Packet Service.
10 November	Carolina	schooner		Charleston, South Carolina	United States	For United States Navy.
19 November	Medway	Vengeur-class ship of the line	Thomas Pitcher	Northfleet	United Kingdom	For Royal Navy.
20 November	Perseus	Laurel-class post ship	John Sutton	Ringmore	United Kingdom	For Royal Navy.
24 November	Lacedaemonian	Fifth rate	George Parkin	Portsmouth Dockyard	United Kingdom	For Royal Navy.
26 November	Madison	Corvette	Henry Eckford	Sackets Harbor, New York	United States	For United States Navy.
November	Elizabeth	Paddle steamer		River Clyde	United Kingdom	For private owner.
November	King of Rome	Schooner		Seabrook	United States	For private owner.
2 December	Epervier	Cruizer-class brig-sloop	Mary Ross	Rochester	United Kingdom	For Royal Navy.
6 December	Montebello	Océan-class ship of the line	Antoine Arnoud	Toulon	France	For French Navy.
7 December	Despatch	Cruizer-class brig-sloop	John King	Upnor	United Kingdom	For Royal Navy.
12 December	Chasseur	Baltimore Clipper	Thomas Kemp	Fell's Point, Maryland	United Kingdom	For William Hollins.
19 December	Indus	Vengeur-class ship of the line	John Dudman	Blackwall	United Kingdom	For Royal Navy.
26 December	Mahmudiye	First rate		Constantinople	Ottoman Empire	For Ottoman Navy.
30 December	Cornwallis	Merchantman	James Scott & John Hunter	Calcutta	India	For private owner.
Unknown date	Alexander	Merchantman	Michael Smith	Howrah	India	For private owner.
Unknown date	Anaconda	Brig-sloop		Middletown, Connecticut	United States	For New York State Navy.
Unknown date	Andrew Marvel	Whaler	Thomas Richardson	Hull	United Kingdom	For Mr. Marshall.
Unknown date	Ann	Full-rigged ship		Bombay	India	For Pestonjee Bomanjee.
Unknown date	Astrea	Transport ship		Stockton-on-tees	United Kingdom	For Mr. Grayham.
Unknown date	Bell of London	Full-rigged ship		Elgin	United Kingdom	For private owner
Unknown date	Bellona	Merchantman	Fishburn & Broderick	Whitby	United Kingdom	For Fishburn & Broderick.
Unknown date	Catherine Griffith	Merchantman			United States	For private owner.
Unknown date	Cheerful	Brig		Monkwearmouth	United Kingdom	For private owner.
Unknown date	Clitus	Merchantman	John & Philip Laine	Sunderland	United Kingdom	For Laing & Co.
Unknown date	Cora	Schooner		Baltimore, Maryland	United States	For private owner.
Unknown date	Cora	Brig		New Providence	(United Kingdom of Great Britain and Ireland) Bermuda	For private owner.
Unknown date	Cossack	Brig		Sunderland	United Kingdom	For private owner.
Unknown date	Courier	Merchantman		Baltimore, Maryland	United States	For John Gooding, William T. Graham and James Williams.
Unknown date	Coventry	Brig		Plymouth	United Kingdom	For private owner.
Unknown date	Creole	Merchantman	Michael Smith	Calcutta	India	For private owner.
Unknown date	Edward	Brig			United States	For private owner.
Unknown date	Emu	Snow		Liverpool	United Kingdom	For W. Hurry.
Unknown date	Fame	Merchantman		Quebec	(United Kingdom of Great Britain and Ireland) Lower Canada	For Mr. Linthorne.
Unknown date	General Harris	East Indiaman	Daniel Brent	Rotherhithe	United Kingdom	For British East India Company.
Unknown date	Grampus	Schooner	Kemp	Baltimore, Maryland	United States	For private owner.
Unknown date	Growler	Sloop-of-war			United States	For United States Navy.
Unknown date	Herefordshire	Full-rigged ship		Bombay	India	For British East India Company.
Unknown date	Hussar	Privateer		Talbot County, Maryland	United States	For John Hollins, John Smith Hollins, William Hollins and Michael McBlair.
Unknown date	Isabella	Merchantman		Hull	United Kingdom	For W. Moxon & J. White.
Unknown date	Lascelles	Brig			United Kingdom	For J. Foster & Co.
Unknown date	Latona	Brig	William & John M. Gales	Sunderland	United Kingdom	For Rowland Webster.
Unknown date	La Ville de Caen	Lugger		Saint-Malo	France	For Robert Surcouf.
Unknown date	Leda	Merchantman	John & Philip Laing	Sunderland	United Kingdom	For John Hubbard.
Unknown date	Louisiana	Merchantman		New Orleans, Louisiana	United States	For private owner.
Unknown date	Lynx	Topsail schooner	Thomas Kemp	Fells Point, Maryland	United States	For United States Navy.
Unknown date	Meanwell	Full-rigged ship	Heward Benj	Sunderland	United Kingdom	For J. Phillips & Co.
Unknown date	Melantho	Merchantman		Philadelphia, Pennsylvania	United States	For private owner.
Unknown date	Ned	Schooner		Dorchester County, Maryland	United States	For James & William Bosley.
Unknown date	Nonsuch	Schooner		Baltimore, Maryland	United States	For George Stiles.
Unknown date	Prince Regent	Schooner	John Dennis	York	(United Kingdom of Great Britain and Ireland) Upper Canada	For Provincial Marine.
Unknown date	Prince Regent	West Indiaman		Whitehaven	United Kingdom	For Mr. Bowen.
Unknown date	Providence	Merchantman	Bottomley & Co.	King's Lynn	United Kingdom	For private owner.
Unknown date	Rambler	Merchantman			United States	For private owner.
Unknown date	Rambler	Brig	Charles Turner	Medford, Massachusetts	United States	For Benjamin Rich.
Unknown date	Renard	Cutter		Saint-Malo	France	For Robert Surcouf.
Unknown date	Revenge	Privateer		Baltimore, Maryland	United States	For private owner.
Unknown date	Siro	Schooner	William Flanaghan	Baltimore, Maryland	United States	For George Stiles.
Unknown date	Star	Merchantman		New York	United States	For private owner.
Unknown date	Stirling	Merchantman		Montreal	(United Kingdom of Great Britain and Ireland) Upper Canada	For private owner.
Unknown date	Sylph	Bermuda-class ship-sloop	Nathaniel Tynes	Bermuda	(United Kingdom of Great Britain and Ireland) Bermuda	For Royal Navy.
Unknown date	Tay	Merchantman	John & Philip Laing	Sunderland	United Kingdom	For private owner.
Unknown date	Vengeance	Schooner		New York	United States	For private owner.
Unknown date	Union	Brig		Sunderland	United Kingdom	For private owner.
Unknown date	Vittoria	Transport ship	Forsyth & Co.	South Shields	United Kingdom	For private owner.
Unknown date	William Bayard	Merchantman		New York	United States	For Roy Bayard, William Bayard, Enoch Conklin, Allyn Mather, & M.Sims.
Unknown date	Name unknown	Schooner			United States	For private owner.
Unknown date	Name unknown	Merchantman			United States	For private owner.
