= Three Williams (ship) =

Several vessels have been named Three Williams.

- Three Williams (1796 ship) was launched in Holland in 1786, probably under another name. The British captured her in 1796. Thereafter she was a merchantman, primarily a West Indiaman, until 1804 when she made the first of two voyages as a slave ship in the triangular trade in enslaved people. After she delivered captives to Jamaica on her second such voyage, she disappeared from records. Her fate is currently obscure.
- Three Williams (1803 ship) was launched in 1803 at Teignmouth. She traded as a coaster and to Newfoundland. In 1814 a United States privateer captured her, but the Royal Navy recaptured her. She foundered on 8 June 1817.
