= List of ships named Lascelles =

Several vessels have been named Lascelles:

- Lascelles (1779 EIC ship) was launched as an East Indiaman. She made eight voyages for the British East India Company (EIC}, and then briefly became a West Indiaman. She was sold to the government for use as a storeship, but was broken up in 1807.
- Lascelles was being built in 1795 for EIC service when the British Royal Navy purchased her on stocks; the Navy completed her as the fourth-rate HMS Madras.
- Lascelles (1807 ship) was launched at Hull. She was a general trader, sailing to the Baltic, the Mediterranean, and the Americas. In 1809 she successfully repelled a larger privateer in a single-ship action. She wrecked in 1822.
- Lascelles (1812 ship) was a small brig launched at Selby in 1812 that a French privateer captured in 1813.
