= Young William =

Several ships have borne the name Young William:

- Young William (1779 ship) was launched at Whitby in 1779. She was captured and recaptured in 1814 and was lost on Nargon Island in 1815.
- Young William (1794 ship) was launched at Nantes in 1791 and captured by the British. She served as a whaler from 1794 until 1810 when a French frigate captured and burnt her off Madagascar.
- Young William (1794 Whitby ship) was launched at Whitby in 1794. She made one voyage taking stores to Botany Bay. She then sailed to China, discovering or rediscovering several islands on the way. From China she carried a cargo to England for the British East India Company. Later, she made two voyages as a slave ship. She was wrecked in September 1802.
