= Surry (1811 ship) =

History

United Kingdom
- Name: Surry or Surrey
- Owner: 1811: Mangles, London; 1829: John Grieg; 1841: Herring & Co., London; 1845: R. Aikman, Glasgow; 1851: De Mattos & Co., London
- Port of registry: London
- Launched: 1811, Harwich
- Home port: London (1811–1845); Glasgow (1848)
- Fate: Broken up in 1857

General characteristics
- Tons burthen: 443, or 445; 461 after refit (bm)
- Length: 117 ft 6 in (35.8 m)
- Beam: 29 ft 6 in (9.0 m)
- Draught: 18 ft (5.5 m)
- Propulsion: Sail
- Sail plan: Fully square–rigged on 3-masts
- Complement: 25–30
- Armament: 14 × 18- & 9-pounder guns
- Notes: Copper-sheathed

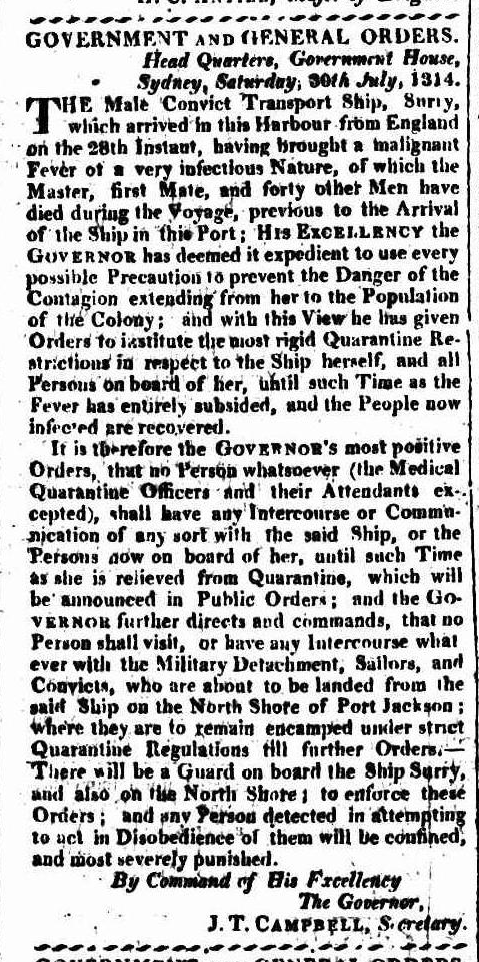
Quarantine of the convict ship Surry on the North Shore of Sydney Harbour in 1814, the first quarantine in Australia

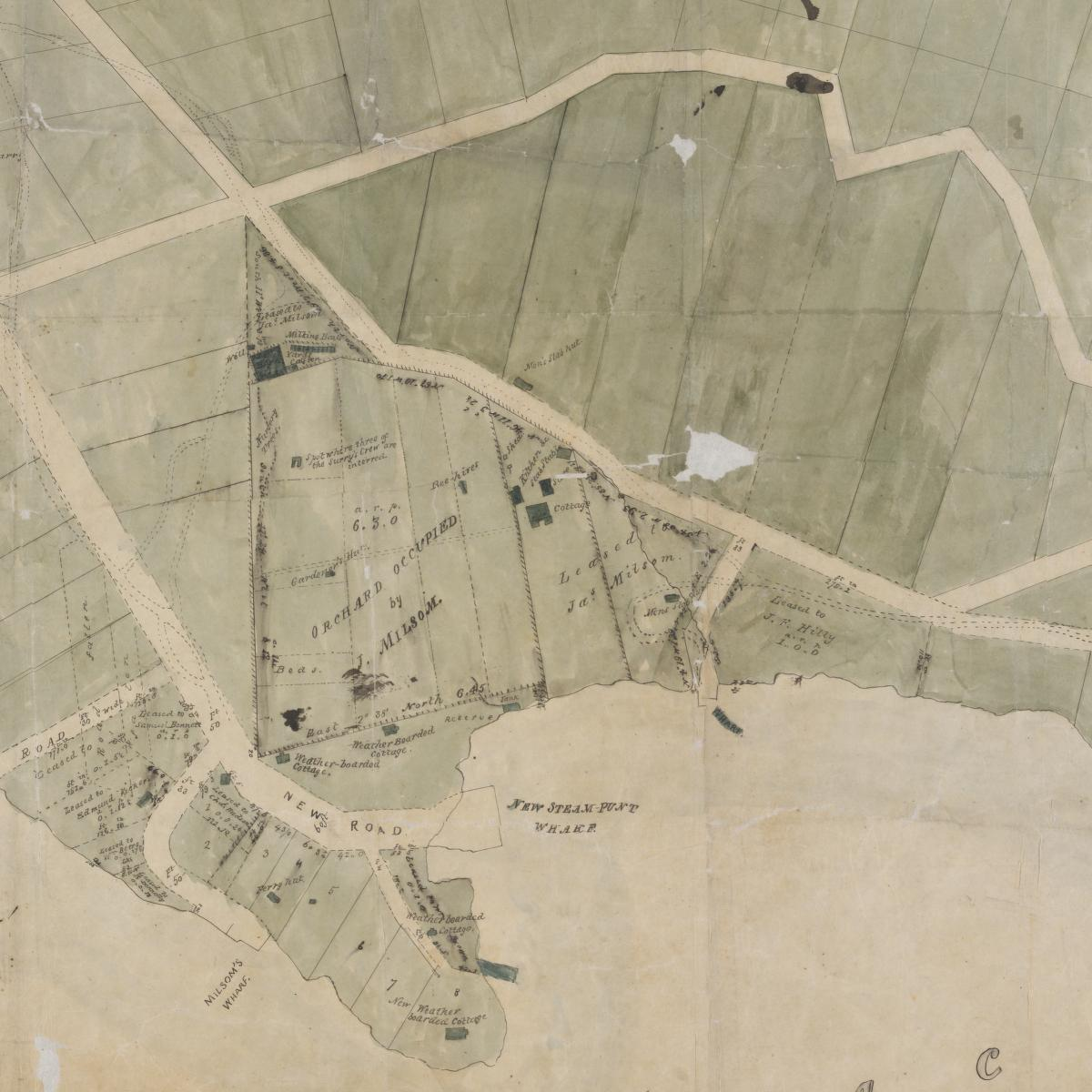
First known map of the Jeffrey Street area in Kirribilli circa 1840 which identifies the spot where three of Surry's crew are interred.

Surry, also known as Surrey, was a square-rigged transport ship, which had an especially long career transporting convicts to Australia. In 11 voyages, the most of any convict transport, she brought 2,177 convicts, male and female, and so became one of the best-known of the vessels that visited Australia. In all, she lost 51 men and one woman during her various passages, 46 of the men dying during her first and most notorious voyage in 1814 when she was under the command of James Patterson. The high death toll on her first voyage led to a Board of Enquiry, which blamed neglect by the Master and Surgeon.

Surry's last convict trip ended when she reached Hobart on 11 August 1842. Thereafter the ship was used as a cargo vessel.

== Description ==
Surry was a square-rigged transport ship of 443 tons burthen. She had an overall length of 117 ft. 6 ins., a breadth above the gunwales of 29 ft. 6 ins, and a draught, when loaded, of 18 ft. She was copper-sheathed, and had quarter galleries, with a bust of Minerva for a figurehead. When carrying prisoners and stores in 1816 she drew 16 ft. 3 ins. forward and 17 ft. 2 ins. aft, being down by the stern eleven inches. She carried a crew of thirty and was armed with fourteen cannons.

When Surry was originally built at Harwich in 1811 she had two decks with a height between decks of 5 ft. 8 ins. However, about 1818, she must have received a major refit – the Shipping Registers after 1819 record her as having three decks. She was owned by the well-known London firm of F. & C.F. Mangles. She was described for many years as a first-class ship built of first-class materials.

== Masters ==
Surry was launched for Mangles & Co., and initially served as a West Indiaman in the Jamaica – London trade. She had two masters who acquired letters of marque. Captain David Talbert received a letter of marque on 12 June 1811, and Captain James Smith received one on 11 July 1812.

James Patterson was Master of Surry on her first convict voyage to Australia in 1814. He died of typhus after the ship arrived in Sydney. Thomas Raine was a junior officer on board Surry on this voyage but the epidemic of typhus that killed Paterson and a large number of the people aboard the vessel left him the only surviving officer. He sailed her back to England and commanded her for the next three voyages (1816, 1819, 1823).

Charles Kemp succeeded Raine for four voyages (1829, 1831, 1833, 1834). His successor, on the ninth and tenth voyages (1836, 1840), was George Sinclair. On the last voyage (1842) Henry Innott was Master.

== First voyage: Typhus epidemic, quarantine and Board of Enquiry ==
On her first voyage transporting convicts from England, Surry sailed on 22 February 1814. She had embarked 200 male convicts, transported under the Plymouth Court's instruction dated 7 February 1814. After a stop in Rio de Janeiro, she arrived in Sydney on 27 July 1814, accompanied by Broxbornebury, which berthed next day. The voyage had taken 156 days.

A typhus epidemic on board Surry had killed 36 of the convicts, together with the Surgeon, First and Second Mates, Boatswain, two seamen and four of the guard. When Surry arrived, the authorities placed all the survivors under a strict quarantine in a camp on the "North Shore" of Port Jackson. Quarantine restrictions on the ship were lifted within a couple of weeks but the restrictions on the camp lasted a few more days. Broxbornebury suffered only two deaths amongst its 120 female convicts, which was a typical death toll for such a voyage.

The authorities established the quarantine camp in the immediate vicinity of what is now Jeffrey Street, Kirribilli. Patterson, the master, died after arrival in Sydney and was buried in the vicinity, as were some others. The people in the camp remained there until 18 August. The convicts were then brought across to Sydney, inspected and distributed to work for free settlers.

The approximate location of the camp is known because a detailed 1840s map identifies the graves of "three typhoid victims and the attending physician". Surry was the first ship in Australia to be quarantined and Jeffrey Street was the first quarantine station in Australia. The graves in Jeffrey Street are believed to be the first burials of Europeans on the North Shore.

The egregiously high death toll led the authorities to convene a Board of Enquiry under the colony's Assistant Surgeon Redfern (himself once a transportee). The Board's official report blamed the deaths on neglect by the Master and Surgeon.

== Later voyages ==
Surrey sailed on for China on 8 November 1814, under Thomas Raine. Surry left Whampoa on 11 March 1815, carrying a cargo for the British East India Company (EIC). She reached the Cape of Good Hope on 11 June before arriving at The Downs on 19 September.

Redfern's report to Governor Macquarie urged the appointment of naval surgeons to the transports, and the provision of an assistant surgeon. This report served to confirm the action by the Transport Commissioners in appointing naval surgeons to the transports, the first of whom, Joseph Arnold, sailed from England on Northampton on 2 January 1815.

In 1816, Surrey, still under Raine, sailed from London, departing Cork on 14 July and travelling via Rio on 26 September reached Sydney after 159 days on 20 December with 150 male prisoners. The markedly improved treatment for the prisoners under Raine and the presence of naval surgeon John F. Bayley were reflected in the safe arrival of all her convicts. Surrey returned to London via Batavia, Calcutta and Brazil.

Rebuilt, and now with three decks, Surrey departed Sheerness on 29 September 1818 and England on 17 October, sailing via Rio to reach Port Jackson on 4 March 1819, 156 days out from Sheerness. The surgeon was Matthew Anderson. Surrey had embarked 160 male prisoners, of whom three died on the voyage. She landed seven in Port Jackson and then she sailed. On 18 March 152 days after leaving England, she reached Van Diemen's Land. Here she disembarked her remaining 150 prisoners. She returned to Port Jackson from the Derwent about 21 April with general cargo, remaining for three months before setting sail for London on 23 July. She took with her detachments of the 48th and 84th Regiments of Foot, and a cargo of hides, whale and seal oil, sealskins, wool, coconut oil and tan.

On 4 November 1819 at 10°N 24°W Surry spoke (encountered) Prince Regent.

On the return voyage to Port Jackson Surry stopped at Valparaíso to take on a load of wheat. While there Captain Raine learned of the three crew members of the whaler Essex, (George Pollard, Jr., master), who were stranded on Henderson Island after a whale had rammed and sank their vessel. On the journey across the Pacific via Easter Island and Tahiti, Surry stopped at Henderson Island (then wrongly identified as Ducie Island) to collect the survivors.

NSW's Governor Lachlan Macquarie sailed on Surrey to England on 15 February 1822.

Surrey departed Portsmouth on 5 October 1822, sailing directly to Port Jackson, which she reached on 4 March 1823, after a passage of 150 days. Surgeon Charles Linton took charge of the 160 male prisoners, with the records showing 157 landed in Sydney.

Now 461 tons and classed E1, Surrey departed London on 11 August 1829 under the command of Charles Kemp and with Henry G Brock as surgeon. She arrived 125 days later in Hobart Town on 14 December. On this voyage she carried 200 male transportees, all but one of whom survived the voyage. She arrived back at her moorings in England on 19 September 1830, having carried a cargo from China for the EIC.

Still under the command of Charles Kemp, and with surgeon Colin A Browning, Surrey sailed from Portsmouth on 17 July 1831, and after a passage of 132 days reached Port Jackson on 26 November. All but one of the 200 male prisoners embarked survived the voyage.

Next, Surry left the Downs on 4 December 1832 with Charles Kemp, master, and David Wyse, surgeon. She arrived at Hobart Town 124 days later on 7 April 1833. Supposedly 204 male prisoners had been embarked, though despite one reported death en route, 204 apparently landed alive in Van Diemen's Land.

Now classed Æ1, Surrey exited Plymouth on 7 April 1834 and 132 days later reached Port Jackson on 17 August. Kemp was still her master but her surgeon was John Smith. On this voyage all 260 male prisoners safely reached Sydney.

Surrey sailed from Cork on 9 January 1836, taking 129 days to reach Port Jackson on 17 May. Her new master was George Sinclair, and her surgeon was Thomas Robertson. Five of the 229 male convicts aboard died on the voyage and two were re-landed; the remaining 224 reached Sydney safely.

Surrey arrived in Port Adelaide on 11 October 1838 from London. Migrants who travelled in this vessel formed a township on the road to Onkaparinga, South Australia, which they named Surryville.

Surrey sailed direct from the Downs on 2 April 1840 with 213 prisoners, all women. After a voyage of 102 days she reached Port Jackson on 13 July. Sinclair was still master, and accompanied on this voyage by surgeon Ed. Leah. One prisoner died on this voyage; the remainder landed safely in Sydney.

On her last voyage as a convict transport, Surrey sailed from Downs to Hobart Town via the Cape, departing 5 April 1842 and arriving 128 days later on 11 August. Her master now was Henry Naylor; her surgeon was John Tarn. Three of the 250 male prisoners embarked died during the passage. She delivered 247 to the authorities in Hobart Town. On her voyage she stopped at Cape Town where she picked up six more prisoners. Two of these may have been former soldiers of the guard on Somersetshire whom a court martial there had sentenced to transportation for their role in an abortive mutiny.

Parsons (1988) reports that Surrey also conveyed convicts in 1848.

== Fate ==
Surry was broken up in 1857.

== Art ==
The National Library of Australia holds a sepia engraving of Surry by Geoffrey Chapman Ingleton (1908–1998).

== Notable persons ==
Thomas Raine, the surviving junior officer on the first voyage, became one of the colony's better known masters. Between 1814 and 1836, Raine captained the Surrey for four voyages and was reported as evidently a man of advanced humanitarian outlook. In 1828 he established Australia's first whaling station, at Eden on the south coast of New South Wales. He was also the first to ship Australian cedar overseas. He is buried in Camperdown Cemetery in Newtown, N.S.W.

Notable passengers included:

- John Reynell, who is thought to have established the first commercial vineyard and winery in South Australia. He planted vine cuttings in 1839 that he had bought at the Cape of Good Hope. Reynell employed a young man named Thomas Hardy, who also became a famed winemaker, to help him tend the vineyards. They became the largest wine producers in the McLaren Vale region.
- Robert Cross, one of the transportees on Surrey, who had been convicted of burglary in Yorkshire Assizes on 31 July 1813 and sentenced to death by hanging. The court commuted his sentence to life imprisonment, which transportees generally served as 14 years' labour in Australia. Robert's wife Jane, with their three children, travelled as "Free Settlers" aboard the Broxbornebury, and commenced an interesting life association with fellow passenger John Horsley, though always in apparently amiable contact with Robert.

Surry transported five of the six Tolpuddle Martyrs.

== Bibliography ==
- Bateson, Charles (1959). The Convict Ships. Brown, Son & Ferguson. OCLC 3778075.
- Hackman, Rowan (2001). Ships of the East India Company. Gravesend, Kent: World Ship Society. ISBN 0-905617-96-7. OCLC 51316017.
