= Surprise (1813 privateer) =

History

United States
- Name: Surprise
- Owner: John Hollins, John Smith Hollins, Michael McBlair, Jas. A. Buchanan, Sam. Smith, Lemuel Taylor, Gerrard Wilson
- Launched: 1813, Saint Michaels, Maryland
- Fate: Wrecked 1815

General characteristics
- Tons burthen: 301 (bm)
- Length: 110 ft 0 in (33.5 m)
- Beam: 25 ft 7 in (7.8 m)
- Depth of hold: 11 ft 10 in (3.6 m)
- Sail plan: Schooner
- Complement: 120-130 men
- Armament: 10 × 18-pounder cannons

Surprise was a highly successful American privateer schooner. She was launched in 1813, and operated out of Baltimore. She captured over 40 British vessels during her brief career. In one case the capture followed a single-ship action. She was wrecked in April 1815, shortly after the end of the War of 1812.

== Voyages ==
During the voyages below Surprise would often based out of Brest. From there she would go on cruises of six to eight weeks.

=== Voyage #1 ===
Captain Clement Cathell commissioned Surprise on 14 March 1814. Under his command she captured some 12 British vessels.

- Fidelity, of North Shields, Hunter, master, was captured on 18 May, off Cape Clear Island, and burnt.
- James & David, Foreman, master, a brig, was sailing from Passages when captured on 18 May; Surprise put the crew of Fidelity on her too, and then gave her up to the crews, after first dismasting her; the Revenue Cruiser Beresford towed James and David into Baltimore, County Cork, that same day. (Note: Beresford appears to have been an Irish revenue vessel, perhaps the second of that name.)
- Fox, Hore, master, a schooner, was captured on 16 May about 80 leagues south of Cork as she was sailing from Poole to Newfoundland; Surprise took off Fox's most valuable cargo, put aboard the crew of a brig that Surprise had captured the previous day, and allowed Fox to proceed. Fox reached Cork on 18 May.
- Hebe, ship, of Leith, was sailing from Halifax to Bermuda with naval stores when Surprise captured her in March, and sent into North Carolina.
- Kutusoff, Turnbull, master, was sailing from La Guaira when Surprise captured her and sent the brig into Frankfort, Maine.
- Margaret, a brig, Omay, master, was sailing from Lisbon to Dublin when Surprise captured her on 27 May; HMS Foxhound recaptured Margaret that day or the next.
- Vivid, brig, Ward, master, was sailing from Lisbon to Belfast when Surprise captured her on 27 May; HMS Ceres recaptured Vivid, which then arrived at Cork on 16 June
- Fortitude, brig, Touzeau, master, was sailing from Rio de Janeiro to Guernsey when Surprise captured her on 27 May; sent into Union River (Maine)
- 1 unidentified vessel
- Traveller, of Lieth, Bishop, master, was sailing from North Bergen to Gibraltar when Surprise captured her on 8 May; on 11 May, HMS Canso recaptured her and sent her into Portsmouth.
- Argo, ship, Sibson, master, was sailing from Dublin and Cork to Quebec when Surprise captured her on 5 September and sent her to America.
- Lively, Benn, master, was sailing from Miramichi 2when Surprise captured and burnt her on 5 September.

=== Voyage #2 ===
Captain James Barnes commissioned Surprise on 16 August 1814. Under his command she captured some 21 British vessels.

Surprise had only been out ten days from Rhode Island when she captured:

- Queen Charlotte, schooner, sailing from St. John's, Newfoundland to Halifax, burnt.
- Milnes, ship, Read, master, sailing from Cork to Miramichi, burnt.
- Endeavour, brig (transport), was sailing from Sydney to St. John's, Newfoundland when Surprise captured her on 2 September at 46°12′N 55°17′W, and sent her to America. However, a frigate encountered Endeavour and chased her on shore near New York, destroying her.
- Caledonia, ship, M'Farlane, master, was sailing from Greenock and Cork to Quebec when Surprise captured her and sent to America. However, HMS Nymphe recaptured Caledonian, and sent her into Halifax, where she arrived on 26 October. Still, Surprise had plundered Caledonia of 150 packets of her cargo.
- Traveler, brig, sailing from Pictou to Harbour Grace, given up to her crew
- Eagle, brig, was sailing from St. John's to Halifax, when Surprise captured and plundered her off Sable Island; Surprise gave Eagle up to her crew under cartel, and she arrived at Halifax on 6 September.
- Young William, ship, of Hull, Stevenson, master, was sailing from London to Halifax when Surprise captured her on 8 September. HMS Plover recaptured her and sent her into St. John's, Newfoundland.
- Eliza, brig, Henly, master, was sailing from Prince Edward's Island to Swansea when Surprise captured her on 8 September off St Peter's Island.
- Polly, brig, Becket, master, from Cork to Miramichi, burnt; crew put on Eliza
- Willing Maid, brig, Paterson, from London to Pictou, burnt; crew put on Eliza

Eliza arrived at Swansea on 17 October with the three crews.

- Albion, brig, sent into New York
- Ann, schooner, sunk
- Charlotte Ann, schooner, sent into Saco, Maine
- Doris, ship, burnt
- Handy Maid, brig, burnt
- Prince Regent, schooner, burnt; however, Regent, Carr, master, from Portsmouth to Quebec, had been reported sunk by Surprise, but she was reported to have arrived at Quebec on 22 September.
- Sally, schooner, burnt
- Wellington, brig, cartel
- 3 unidentified.

=== Voyage #3 ===
Captain Samuel Barstow commissioned Surprise on 8 November 1814. Under his command she captured some ten British vessels.

- Cossack, Black, master, a brig of Greenock, had been sailing from Alicante to Newfoundland when the privateer Grand Turk captured her. HMS Bulwark recaptured Cossack, only to have her fall prey to Surprise. Surprise sent Cossack into Salem.
- Forth, brig, burnt
- Good Intent, divested, freed.
- Hazard, schooner, burnt
- Lucy Ann, schooner, cartel
- Mary, schooner, sunk
- Nancy, schooner, retaken
- Sea Flower, schooner, burnt
- Star: Surprise captured the schooner Star on 28 January 1815, after a single-ship action that lasted an hour. Star had a crew of 26 men and was armed with eight guns; she had one man killed and one wounded before she struck. Surprise had no casualties. (Note: Emmons reports that Barnes was captain of Surprise, but by this time Barstow had replaced Barnes.) Lloyd's List reported that Star, Thompson, master, had been sailing from Batavia to London. Surprise sent Star into New York
- Schooner, cartel

== Fate ==
Surprise returned to New York about 6 March. She had been out four months (48 days from Brest) and had captured 11 vessels. She ran aground on 3 April 1815, in a storm at Manasquan. Fifteen of her crew drowned.
