= HMS Saturn =

74-gun Royal Navy ship of the line

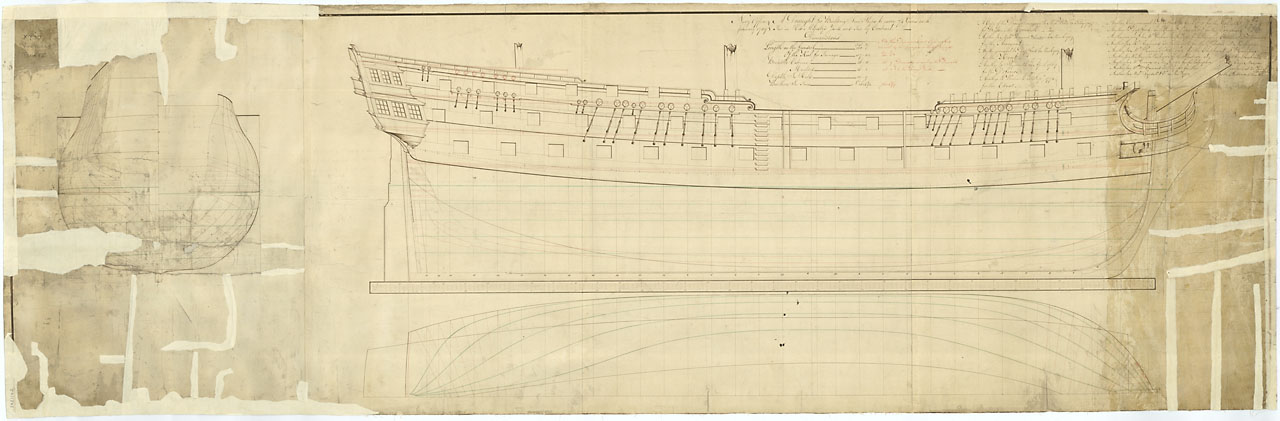
- Saturn

History

Great Britain
- Name: Saturn
- Ordered: 22 December 1781
- Builder: Thomas Raymond, Northam, Southampton
- Laid down: August 1782
- Launched: 22 November 1786
- Completed: 5 February 1787
- Commissioned: May 1790
- Fate: Broken up, 1868

General characteristics
- Class & type: Arrogant-class ship of the line
- Tons burthen: 1,616 68/94 (bm)
- Length: 168 ft 2 in (51.3 m) (gundeck)
- Beam: 46 ft 11 in (14.3 m)
- Depth of hold: 19 ft 10 in (6.0 m)
- Propulsion: Sails
- Sail plan: Full-rigged ship
- Complement: 600
- Armament: 74 muzzle-loading, smoothbore guns: Lower gundeck: 28 × 32 pdr guns; Upper gundeck: 28 × 18 pdr guns; Forecastle: 4 × 9 pdr guns; Quarter deck: 14 × 9 pdr guns

HMS Saturn was a 74-gun third rate Arrogant-class ship of the line built for the Royal Navy during the 1780s. Completed in 1787, she played a minor role in the French Revolutionary Wars and the Napoleonic Wars. The ship served during the Napoleonic Wars with the Channel Fleet, taking part in the 1801 Battle of Copenhagen. With the beginning of the War of 1812, Saturn was razeed to become a frigate designed to take on large American vessels of that type. Saturn was deployed as part of the blockading squadron of New York City from 1814 to 1815. From 1825, the vessel was in harbour service and was broken up in 1868.

== Description ==
The Arrogant-class ship of the line was designed by Sir Thomas Slade, co-Surveyor of the Navy. It was one of the "common" type of 74 with lighter guns than those of the "large" classes. Saturn was one of the slightly modified second batch of Arrogants. She measured 168 feet 2 inches (51.3 m) on the gundeck and 138 feet 1 inch (42.1 m) on the keel. She had a beam of 46 feet 11 inches (14.3 m), a depth of hold of 19 feet 10 inches (6.0 m) and had a tonnage of 1,616 68/94 tons burthen. The ships' crew numbered 600 officers and ratings. They were fitted with three masts and were ship-rigged.

The ships were armed with 74 muzzle-loading, smoothbore guns that consisted of twenty-eight 32-pounder guns on their lower gundeck and twenty-eight 18-pounder guns on their upper deck. Their forecastle mounted four 9-pounder guns. On their quarterdeck they carried fourteen 9-pounder guns.

Saturn's armament as a 58-gun frigate consisted of twenty-eight 32-pounders on the lower deck and twenty-eight 42-pounder carronades and a pair of 12-pounder guns on the upper deck. Her crew now numbered 495 men.

== Construction and career ==
Saturn was the first ship of her name to serve in the Royal Navy. She was ordered on 27 December 1781 and was laid down by Thomas Raymond at his shipyard in Northam, Southampton, in August 1782. The ship was launched on 22 November 1786, completed at Portsmouth Dockyard on 5 February 1787 and immediately placed in ordinary. Saturn was commissioned by Captain Robert Linzee in May 1790 although she was not ready for sea until 12 June.

In a minor maritime incident a boat belonging to Saturn overturned in Cawsand Bay between Redding Point and St Nicholas Island. Eleven of the twelve crew members on board were drowned.

In 1801 Saturn was assigned to the Channel Fleet under the command of Captain Boyles. Then under Captain Robert Lambert she sailed with Admiral Sir Hyde Parker's expedition to the Baltic. She was present at the Battle of Copenhagen as part of Admiral Parker's reserve.

Saturn was cut down to create a razee 58-gun spar-decked frigate in 1813 at the Plymouth dockyards in preparation for service in the War of 1812. Three 74-gun ships were treated in this manner to produce 'super heavy frigates' that could take on the large American 44-gun frigates. Retaining their 32-pounder main armament, supplemented by 42-pounder carronades, the resulting frigates were much more powerful than the American frigates they were intended to engage. The rasée frigates proved to be very fast in heavy seas, but in lighter airs conventional frigates had a distinct advantage in speed. On 14 February 1814, under Captain James Nash, Saturn sailed for Bermuda; later she was on the Halifax station. She then served as part of the blockading-squadron off New York until the War of 1812 ended with the signing of the Treaty of Ghent in 1814.

On 25 May 1814 Saturn captured the American privateer schooner Hussar, of 211 tons (bm), at 40°8′N 73°28′W after a four-hour chase. Hussar was armed with one 12-pounder gun and nine 12-pounder carronades, eight of which she threw overboard during the chase. Her complement consisted of 98 men. She had been in commission for only a week and had left New York the previous evening for her first cruise, bound for Newfoundland; she was provisioned for a four-month cruise. Nash described her as "coppered, copper-fastened, and sails remarkably fast". (Note: Head money was paid in May 1816. A first-class share was worth £105 12s 10d; a sixth-class share, that of an ordinary seaman, was worth 8s 3d.) Hussar had been launched in 1812 and had made previous cruises, but apparently without success. She was under the command of Francis Jenkins when Saturn captured her.

From January 1815, Captain Thomas Brown, assumed command of Saturn until Nash returned to command in April 1815.

From 1825 Saturn was on harbour service at Milford Haven. She was broken up in 1868.
