= Somersetshire (1810 ship) =

History

United Kingdom
- Name: Somersetshire
- Builder: Samuel & Daniel Brent, Rotherhithe
- Launched: 7 August 1810
- Fate: Last listed 1844

General characteristics
- Tons burthen: 447, or 449, or 449,15/94 or 450 (bm)
- Length: 117 ft 8 in (35.9 m)
- Beam: 29 ft 3 in (8.9 m)
- Propulsion: Sail
- Complement: 40
- Armament: 18 × 9-pounder guns

Somersetshire, was launched in 1810 on the River Thames as a West Indiaman. She made two voyages to Australia transporting convicts, and one in between with passengers. On the second convict transport voyage some convicts and guards planned a mutiny that her captain was able to foil. Somersetshire is last listed in 1844.

In between convict transport contracts, she made numerous other voyages, including a diarised (by "BJ" Barker Joseph Benson) voyage to Bombay (Mumbai) and back in 1838.

== Career ==
Somersetshire first appeared in Lloyd's Register (LR) in the volume for 1810.

Year	Master	Owner	Trade	Source & notes
1810	Haly	Gordon & Co.	London–West Indies	LR

Captain Robert Haly (or Haley, or Hayley) received a letter of marque for Somersetshire on 9 March 1811.

On Monday 7 October 1811 Somersetshire arrived in the Downs from Jamaica. The evening before she had warded off an attack near Dover by three French privateers.

Year	Master	Owner	Trade	Source & notes
1812	Haly	Gordon & Co. Goodson	London–West Indies	LR
1814	Haly; Scott	Gordon & Co. Goodson	London–Bahia; London–Botany Bay	LR; new keel & damages repaired 1812

=== First convict voyage (1814) ===
Under the command of Alexander Scott, Somersetshire sailed from Spithead, England on 10 May 1814, and arrived at Port Jackson on 17 October. She embarked 200 male convicts, one of whom died on the voyage. Somersetshire left Port Jackson on 5 December bound for Bengal.

Year	Master	Owner	Trade	Source & notes
1818	Scott; Smyth	Dawson's; Shedden & Co.	London–Jamaica	LR; new keel & damages repaired 1812
1820	Smyth; C.Parent	Shedden & Co.	London–Jamaica	LR; damages repaired 1812
1826	Ross	Dawson & Co.	London–Jamaica	LR; damages repaired 1812, new wales & some repairs 1825
1836	Murray; Jackson	Chapman	London–Malta	LR; new topsides 1826, new deck 1832, & some repairs 1838
1838	Murray; Jackson	Chapman	Liverpool–Bombay	LR; new topsides 1826 & new deck 1832

=== Cargo & Passenger transport (1838) ===
1838 - Somersetshire, under Captain John Jackson.

- departed Llannerch-y-medd, Wales (February 27)
- docked for repairs in A Coruña Spain (March 7 to April 1)
- traversed the Maedeira Achipelago (April 7)
- sighted the Canary Islands (April 8)
- docked for minor repairs at Santiago, Cape Verde Islands (April 10)
- cross the Tropic of Cancer (April 12)
- off the cost of São Nicolau, Cape Verde Islands (April 16th), in company with the Barque 'Wave", which was bound for New South Wales - trading butter, clothes, empty bottles & other goods for livestock, fruit & vegetables
- in company of two ships, a French vessel & the "Barrito Junier" from Madras (April 24)
- spoke with a vessel named "Mary" bound for Bordeaux (April 30)
- rounded the Cape of Good Hope (May 30)
- Observed "an extraordinary phenomena. A star suddenly seemed to ignite and burst, lighting up the horizon as it were broad day light" (June 13)
- rounded Cape St Mary, the southernmost point of the Island of Madagascar (June 14)
- sailed "The Middle Passage" (between Madagascar & Mauritius)
- traded in the strait with an American South Sea Whaler "Neptune of New York" - gunpowder & coal for 20 gallons of sperm oil (June 20)
- sighted whales off the Seychelles archipelago (June 26)
- anchored off Bombay harbour (July 11)

=== Passenger transport - London to Port Adelaide (1839) ===
Somersetshire, Captain John Jackson, brought 234 passengers to Port Adelaide. She had left London on 18 April 1839 and she arrived there on 28 August. One of her passengers was Thomas Boutflower Bennett.

=== Second convict voyage (1841-42) ===
Somersetshire sailed from Plymouth on 20 December 1841, under the command of Charles Motley (or Mottley), and arrived at Hobart Town on 30 May 1842. She embarked 219 male convicts; one died on the voyage. One officer and 30 rank-and-file being sent out to join the 51st King's Own Light Infantry provided the guard.

What makes this voyage notable was the mutiny plot that some prisoners developed during the voyage. The mutineers' plan was to murder the officers, place in the ship's boats those who would not join the mutiny, and then sail to South America. The convicts succeeded in getting several of the guard to join their plot.

It is not clear how the officers discovered the plot, but Captain Motley decided to put into Table Bay. There a two-week court martial tried the four soldiers who were part of the planned mutiny, with one of the four testifying against his companions. The court martial sentenced the ring leader to death by firing squad, and the other two to transportation. (Surry picked up six prisoners at the Cape when she stopped there later that year and the two mutinous soldiers may have been among them.) Somersetshire left the Cape on 12 April and encountered no further issues on her voyage.

Somersetshire arrived in Sydney on 28 June, having sailed from Hobart in ballast.

Year	Master	Owner	Trade	Source & notes
1842	G.Mottley	Chapman	London–Hobart Town	LR; new topsides 1826, new deck 1832, & some repairs 1838 & 1839

== Fate ==
Somersetshire, with Mottley, master, is last listed in Lloyd's Register in 1844.
