= Three Williams (1803 ship) =

History

United Kingdom
- Name: Three Williams
- Launched: 1803, Teignmouth
- Captured: 17 October 1814, and recaptured
- Fate: Foundered 8 June 1817

General characteristics
- Tons burthen: 95 (bm)
- Sail plan: Brig

Three Williams was launched in 1803 at Teignmouth. She traded as a coaster and to Newfoundland. In 1814 a United States privateer captured her, but the Royal Navy recaptured her. She foundered on 8 June 1817.

== Career ==
Three Williams appeared in Lloyd's Register (LR) in 1804.

Year	Master	Owner	Trade	Source
1804	Fouracres	Warren & Co.	Star-Cross–Teignmouth	LR

In February 1805, Lloyd's List reported that Three Williams had been driven onshore at Teignmouth Bar. She had been on her way from London to Newcastle and Teignmouth. She was gotten off.

Then in December 1806, Lloyd's List reported that Three Williams, Fowacre, master, had gone on shore at Exmouth while coming from Sunderland. She underwent repairs in 1807.

Year	Master	Owner	Trade	Source & notes
1810	W. Fox	Captain	Teignmouth–Liverpool	LR; damages repaired 1807

Captain William Fox purchased Three Williams in 1809. His papers exist for 1803–1804, but unfortunately there is a gap between 1804 and 1816, (Note: In all, the papers include his correspondence re the management of six vessels that he owned or part-owned at various times, but for which he was the managing owner. The six were: Endeavour, Cognac, Hope, Three Williams, and two different vessels named Good Intent. William Fox was the managing owner of the vessels in which he had an ownership interest.) so there is no correspondence covering the purchase, or her capture in 1814. He started sailing between Teignmouth and Newfoundland. In 1803–1804 he had been part-owner of two brigs similar in size to Three Williams. These vessels normally made one voyage to Newfoundland and back annually. In addition they made coastal voyages when they could. When the two vessels were in Newfoundland waters they were primarily engaged in trading, although they occasionally did some fishing. Fox apparently continued the Teignmouth to Newfoundland trade with Three Williams.

Lloyd's List reported in December 1814 that the United States privateer Grand Turk had captured Cossack and Three Williams between 18 September and 18 October.

Grand Turk was one of the most successful privateers during the War of 1812, (Note: Grand Turk had been launched in 1812 at Wiscasset, Maine for a group of 30 investors from Salem, Massachusetts. She was of 30984/95 tons burthen.) and her logbook survives. Grand Turk, Captain Green, was on her fourth cruise. Three Williams was the 24th prize of her career. Grand Turk had captured her on 17 October at 38°33′N 16°24′W. Three Williams had been on her way from Newfoundland to Lisbon with a cargo of dried codfish. (Note: Peabody's book has a map of Grand Turk's fourth cruize. She had been on her way back to the United States when she captured Cossack, and then shortly thereafter, Three Williams between Spain and the Azores.)

Earlier, Grand Turk had captured Melziade, her 20th prize. Between these two, Grand Turk had also captured Betsey, Baltic, and Cossack. Melziade was sailing from Malta to London with a cargo of raisins and gum tragacanth. Melziade was old, so after taking out her cargo, Captain Green put the crews of the other prizes aboard her and released her. He put prize crews aboard the other four vessels and sent them to the United States.

HMS Arab recaptured Three Williams and sent her into Halifax, Nova Scotia, where she arrived on 18 February 1815. The records of the Vice admiralty court in Halifax show that the recaptured Three Williams had come into Shelburne. Three Williams, Whiteway, master, had a cargo of 1,990 quintals of dried fish.

By 1816, post-war slump was affecting maritime trade. Captain Fox now was part-owner in three vessels. His son, William Fox, jr. was captain of the 130-ton snow New Providence. His second son, Thomas Fox, was captain of Good Intent. His nephew, Anthony Fox, was captain of Three Williams. William Fox Senior's correspondence with his three captains shows the difficulty of finding cargoes, especially from Teignmouth to Newfoundland.

At some point, William Fox wrote to Anthony Fox reminding Anthony to maintain complete records covering every article that he, Anthony, purchased, to include the price and quantity. William complained that Anthony had overpaid for repairs, food, and items for Three Williams. William noted which expenditures in particular were egregious.

William Fox Senior was able to get a cargo from Liverpool to Newfoundland and loaded some general cargo at his expense in the hope of selling it there. He advised Anthony Fox to take great care with expenses because freight rates were so low. On her way from Liverpool to Newfoundland, Three Williams sprung a leak and had to put in to Holyhead to repair. William wrote to Anthony, stating that he, William, hoped that Anthony had not had too much sail and pressed Three Williams unnecessarily hard. He also admonished Anthony for his expenditures for beer and spirits, pointing out he, William, had never incurred such costs.

Three Williams delivered her main cargo to St. John's and then took most of her general cargo on to Placentia. At Placentia Anthony Fox was able to sell the speculative cargo. He took on a cargo of dried fish for Lisbon. William Fox's agent was also able to secure a charter for fruit to Bristol for a lump sum of £140. From Bristol Three Williams crossed to Newport, where she loaded coal for Teignmouth.

Three Williams must have sailed again to Newfoundland. The last decipherable letter in Captain Fox’s letter-books is dated 10 March 1817. In it he discusses the difficulty of finding cargoes.

== Fate ==
Three Williams foundered on 8 June 1817. She was sailing from Liverpool to Newfoundland. Her crew took to her boat and arrived two days later at Tragartha (Tracarta), near Castle Townsend. Earlier, Camilla, M'Arthur, master, from Berbice to Liverpool, had spoken her near Cape Clear Island. Three Williams had reported being leaky.
