= Regent (1812 ship) =

History

United Kingdom
- Name: Regent
- Owner: James Haig
- Builder: Matthew Smith, Calcutta
- Launched: 27 April 1812
- Fate: Wrecked November 1822

General characteristics
- Type: Ship
- Tons burthen: 911 or 916, or 939, or 93924/94, bm)
- Length: 150 ft 6 in (45.9 m) (overall); 122 ft 0 in (37.2 m) (keel)
- Beam: 37 ft 7 in (11.5 m)
- Depth of hold: 15 ft 7 in (4.7 m)
- Propulsion: Sail
- Notes: Three decks

Regent was launched at Calcutta in 1812 and made four voyages for the British East India Company (EIC) as an "extra ship", that is under charter. She was lost in November 1822 while on the outward-bound leg of her fourth voyage.

== Career ==
=== EIC voyage #1 (1812-1813) ===
Captain James Haig sailed from Calcutta on 15 June 1812, bound for England. Regent was at Saugor on 15 September.

There is an account that the Indiaman Regent encountered three French privateers on 12 November and was able to sink one and drive the other two off. That account states that Regent was armed with 12 guns and had a crew of 36. (Note: The account has no detail as to the master's name or the location where the engagement occurred. There is no record of any other Regent East Indiaman, though there may have been West Indiamen. The number of guns and the size of the crew seem small for the Regent of the engagement to be the Regent of this article. Furthermore, if the engagement had involved the Regent of this article it would have had to have occurred in the Indian Ocean, which after the French had in 1810 lost their base at Île de France, saw few if any privateers.)

Regent reached the Cape of Good Hope on 29 December, and was at St Helena on 25 Jan 1813. She arrived at the Downs on 14 May.

Regent was admitted to the Registry of Great Britain on 4 December 1813. Although Regent does not appear in either Lloyd's Register or the Register of Shipping at this time, there are reports of her visiting Java in 1814, with Haig as master. The EIC had Regent measured in 1815.

=== EIC voyage #2 (1816-1817) ===
Captain Philip Ridley sailed from the Downs on 26 February 1816, bound for Madras and China. Regent reached Madras on 30 June. She reached Penang on 12 August and Malacca on 6 September, before arriving at Whampoa Anchorage on 3 November. Homeward bound, she crossed the Second Bar on 2 January 1817, reached St Helena on 16 April, stopped as Ascension on 26 April, and arrived at the Downs on 21 June.

=== EIC voyage #3 (1818-1819) ===
Captain Ridley left Portsmouth on 2 August 1818, bound for China. Regent reached Batavia on 26 November and arrived at Whampoa on 22 January 1819. Homeward bound she crossed the Second Bar on 22 February and reached St Helena on 24 May.

Ripley reported to the authorities on St Helena on 29 May, as Regent sailed, that some person had approached him and offered him £600 (payable via draft drawn on English bankers), to carry a secret letter from Longwood, Napoleon Bonaparte's residence at St Helena, to England. (All of Napoleon's correspondence was subject to censorship.) Ridley stated that he could not remember who had made the offer. On her return to England, Regent carried Lord and Lady George Bingham who were returning home. (Note: Brigadier-general Sir George Ridout Bingham, KCB, had been commander of the garrison on St Helena.)

Regent arrived at the Downs on 30 July.

=== EIC voyage #4 (1822-Loss) ===
Captain Robert W. Norfor sailed from the Downs on 29 April 1822, bound for China. On her way she had to put into Rio de Janeiro for repairs to her mainmast. She left on 3 July to continue her voyage.

== Fate ==
Lloyd's List reported on 14 March 1823 that the East Indiaman Regent had departed from Angier, Netherlands East Indies for China, but that there was no further trace of her, and that she was presumed to have foundered with the loss of all hands. Regent wrecked on 1, or 3 November 1822 near Manila while she was on her way to China. The next report in Lloyd's List stated that she had been totally lost though 3000 packets had been saved. The Third Officer and five seamen had lost their lives. Another report puts the number of lives lost at 14. A detailed report of the voyage and the loss puts the loss site at Luban Island (6°25′49″N 126°13′32″E).

The EIC put the value of the cargo it had lost aboard Regent at £117,375.
