= Vittoria (1812 ship) =

History

United Kingdom
- Name: Vittoria
- Builder: Forsyth & Co., South Shields
- Launched: 1812
- Fate: Foundered 1830

General characteristics
- Tons burthen: 341, or 344 (bm)

Vittoria was launched at Shields in 1812. She spent much of her career sailing as a transport, primarily across the Atlantic, though she visited Malta once. At least once she carried immigrants to Canada from Ireland. She disappeared in late 1830.

== Career ==
Vittoria first appeared in Lloyd's Register (LR) in 1819. She may have served as a government transport before that.

Year	Master	Owner	Trade	Source
1819	W.Bonus	Brown	London–Quebec	LR

Vittoria, William Bowness, master, sailed from Belfast, Ireland, on 5 June 1819. She arrived at Quebec on 17 July with 273 migrants.

Year	Master	Owner	Trade	Source
1821	G.W.Coles	Brown	Cork	LR
1823	G.W.Coles; Forbes	Brown	Cork; London–Jamaica	LR
1824	Forbes; Brown	Brown	London–Jamaica	LR
1826	Brown; Speed	Brown	London transport	LR
1827	Speed; Lyon	Brown	Cork transport	LR
1831	Lyon	Brown & Co.	London–Honduras	LR

== Fate ==
Vittoria disappeared without a trace in the second half of 1830 on her return voyage to London from Honduras. In November it was reported that she had been missing since 1 August. Lloyd's Register for 1831 had the annotation "missing" under her entry.
