= Hussar (1812 ship) =

History

United States
- Name: Hussar
- Owner: John Hollins, John Smith Hollins, William Hollins, & Michael McBlair
- Builder: Talbot County, Maryland
- Launched: 1812
- Captured: 25 May 1814

General characteristics
- Tons burthen: 211 (bm)
- Length: 96 ft (29.3 m)
- Beam: 24 ft (7.3 m)
- Depth of hold: 10 ft 3 in (3.1 m)
- Sail plan: Schooner
- Complement: Letter of marque: 30; Privateer: 100
- Armament: Letter of marque: 2 × 6-pounder guns + 4 × 12-pounder carronades; Privateer: 1 × 12-pounder gun + 8 × 12-pounder carronades

Hussar was an American privateer active during the War of 1812. Hussar was launched in 1812 and made several cruises, first two as a letter of marque, and two as a privateer, but apparently without success. HMS Saturn captured her.

== Letter of marque and privateer ==
- First letter of marque: Captain Joshua Mezick commissioned Hussar on 10/31/12.
- Second letter of marque: Captain Tom Manning commissioned her on 7/17/13.
- First privateer cruise: Captain Joshua Mezick commissioned her on 11/3/13. No record of any captures.
- Second privateer cruise: Captain Francis Jenkins commissioned her on 5/17/14.

== Capture ==
On 25 May 1814 Saturn captured Hussar at 40°8′N 73°28′W after a four-hour chase. Hussar was armed with one 12-pounder gun and nine 12-pounder carronades, eight of which she threw overboard during the chase. Her complement consisted of 98 men. She had been in commission for only a week and had left New York the previous evening for her first cruise, bound for Newfoundland; she was provisioned for a four-month cruise. Nash described her as "coppered, copper-fastened, and sails remarkably fast". (Note: Head money was paid in May 1816. A first-class share was worth £105 12s 10d; a sixth-class share, that of an ordinary seaman, was worth 8s 3d.)

== Fate ==
Hussar was condemned at the Vice admiralty court, Halifax, Nova Scotia.
