= Three Williams (1796 ship) =

British merchant and slave ship (1796–2007)

History

Great Britain
- Name: Three Williams
- Launched: 1786, Holland
- Renamed: 1796
- Captured: 1796
- Fate: Unknown post-1807

General characteristics
- Tons burthen: 226, or 260, or 264, or 266 (bm)
- Complement: 36
- Armament: 1797: 4 × 4-pounder guns; 1804: 16 × 6-pounder guns

Three Williams was launched in Holland in 1786, probably under another name. The British captured her in 1796. Thereafter she was a merchantman, primarily a West Indiaman, until 1804 when she made the first of two voyages as a slave ship in the triangular trade in enslaved people. After she delivered captives to Jamaica on her second such voyage, she disappeared from records. Her fate is currently obscure.

== Career ==
Three Williams first appeared in Lloyd's Register (LR) in 1797.

Year	Master	Owner	Trade	Source & notes
1797	Compleman	Walker & Co.	Hull–Petersburg	LR; repairs 1797
1798	Compleman; S.Conner	Walker & Co. Tethernton	Hull–Baltic; Liverpool–Demerara	LR; good repair 1797
1799	S.Conner; Coppinger	Tetherington	Liverpool–Demerara	LR; good repair 1797
1801	J.Williams	Tetherington	Liverpool–Demerara	LR; good repair 1797
1802	J.Williams; J.Murray	Fotherington	Demerara–Cork; Liverpool–Demerara	LR; good repair 1797

There was a report in early 1802 that Three Brothers had run down and sunk Three Williams on 6 March near Rathlin Island while Three Williams was on her way to Demerara from London. However, Three Williams put into Campbeltown having sustained slight damage, and that more from weather than any collision.

Year	Master	Owner	Trade	Source & notes
1803	J.Murray	Fotherington	Liverpool–Demerara; London–Liverpool	LR; good repair 1797
1804	J.Murray; J.Smith	Fotherington; Atherton	London–Liverpool; Liverpool–Africa	LR; good repair 1797 & large repair 1803

1st voyage transporting enslaved people (1804–1805): Captain John Smith, Jr., acquired a letter of marque on 16 April 1804. He sailed from Liverpool on 5 May. Three Williams stopped at Demerara and then sailed for Jamaica on 25 January 1805. She arrived at Kingston on 10 February 1805, with 261 captives. She arrived back at Liverpool on 14 October. She had brought back a cargo of sugar, coffee, rum, hides, cotton, ginger, tortoise shell, wine, and 74 logs of barwood.

Year	Master	Owner	Trade	Source & notes
1807	J.Smith; J.M.M'Clune	Atherton	Liverpool–Africa	LR; good repair 1797, large repair 1803, and new deck and repairs 1807

2nd voyage transporting enslaved people (1807): Captain McClune sailed from Liverpool on 23 March 1807. He started acquiring captives on 12 June, first at Anomabu, and then at Cape Coast Castle. On 12 July, Three Williams was at Cape Coast, on her way to "Langos". On 8 December, she arrived at Kingston with 185 captives.

== Fate ==
Although Lloyd's Register and the Register of Shipping continued to carry Three Williams for many more years after 1807, the data was stale. She did not appear in Lloyd's List's or other newspapers' ship arrival and departure notices. It is currently unclear what became of her after she arrived at Kingston.

The Slave Trade Act 1807 had ended British participation in the trans-Atlantic slave trade; no British vessels could initiate a slave trading voyage after 1 May 1807. Three Williams may therefore have been sold, with new owners renaming her.
