= Star (1812 ship) =

American, then British ship

History

United States
- Name: Star
- Launched: 1812, New York
- Captured: 9 February 1813

United Kingdom
- Name: Star
- Acquired: 1814 by purchase of a prize
- Captured: 1815

General characteristics
- Tons burthen: 350, or 392 (bm)
- Complement: 35
- Armament: 1813: 6 guns; 1814: 10 × 9-pounder carronades

Star was launched in New York in 1812. She was captured in 1813 and first appears in the Register of Shipping (RS) in 1814. (Note: She probably appeared in 1814 in Lloyd's Register's supplemental pages, but the pages are missing from the on-line copy.) In 1815 she sailed to Batavia under a license from the British East India Company (EIC). On her way back a privateer from the United States captured her in a notable single-ship action and then sent her into New York.

== Career ==
On 13 February 1813 Star, which had been sailing from New York to Bordeaux, arrived at Bideford. She was a prize to HMS Superb. Superb had captured her on 9 February near Belleisle. Captain Charles Paget, of Superb, described the prize as "the fine American brig Star, of three hundred and fifty tons, six guns, and thirty-five men." Star was sold to Christie & Co., who retained her name.

Year	Master	Owner	Trade	Source
1815 (stale data)	Williams	Gilpin	London–Baltic	LR
1814	F.Gilpin	Gilpin	London–CGH	RS

In 1813 the EIC had lost its monopoly on the trade between India and Britain. British ships were then free to sail to India or the Indian Ocean under a license from the EIC. Star sailed for Batavia on 10 May 1814 under a license from the EIC.

The Baltimore privateer Surprise encountered Star on 28 January 1815 at 24°10′N 35°50′W. After a single-ship action that lasted an hour Surprise captured Star. Star had a crew of 26 men and was armed with eight 12-pounder carronades; she had one man killed and one wounded before she struck. Surprise had no casualties. (Note: Maclay reports that Barnes was captain of Surprise, but by this time Barstow had replaced Barnes. Another source confirms that Surprise's master was Barstow.) Lloyd's List reported that Star, Thompson, master, had been sailing from Batavia to London.

Surprise put an 18-man prize crew into Star, after taking aboard some of Star's cargo. The two vessels then sailed for new York. A snowstorm separated the two vessels on 26 or 28 February, but both arrived at New York. Star arrived on 1 March. (Note: Hackman mis-attributes this Star's fate to that of Star.)

A newspaper account of Star's arrival in New York notes that she had been built there. It describes her as of 400 tons and eight guns. Her cargo consisted of 2012 bags of coffee, 1186 bags of sugar, 83 cases of cinnamon, 45 tubs of camphor, five cases of tortoise shell, 297 bags of sago, 22 bales of nankeens, 224 piculs of sappan wood, 90 sheets of heavy copper, 83 bales of woolen trousers, etc. The value of the prize was estimated at $250,000, or $300,000. Another account reports that the value of Star' cargo on Surprise was worth $150,000; the total value of Star's cargo was worth $300,000.

Custom's duty on Star's cargo was 49,641.83. Two of the investors in Surprise purchased Star. They subsequently resold her for $28,000.
