= William Dawson (1812 ship) =

UK merchant ship (1812–1859)

History

United Kingdom
- Name: William Dawson
- Owner: Messrs. Bolton & Littledale
- Builder: Messrs. Brockbank, Lancaster
- Launched: 24 August 1812
- Fate: Last listed in 1859

General characteristics
- Tons burthen: 481, or 485, or 486, or 496 (bm)

William Dawson was launched at Lancaster in 1812 as a West Indiaman. In 1818–1819, she made one voyage to India, sailing under a licence from the British East India Company (EIC). Thereafter William Dawson sailed to North America, primarily Canada from homeports such as Liverpool and later Alloa. She suffered several relatively minor mishaps and was last listed in 1859.

== Career ==
William Dawson first appeared in Lloyd's Register (LR), in 1813.

Year	Master	Owner	Trade	Source
1812	Ferguson	Bolton	Liverpool–St Croix	LR

On 13 April 1813, William Dawson, William Ashton, and Mary captured the American schooner Miranda, which was on her way from Kennebunk to Cuba. The three British ships were coming from St Croix. (Note: Although Captain Ferguson of William Dawson had not acquired a letter of marque, Captain Thomas Dawson, of William Ashton, had acquired one on 25 October 1810.) However, the United States privateer Paul Jones recaptured Miranda, only to have HMS Unicorn recapture her. (Note: The American schooner Miranda, of Rhode Island, had a crew of six men, and a burthen of 104 tons. She originally had been sailing for Matunzas with a cargo of lumber. On 23 May 1813 HMS Leonidas captured Paul Jones off Ireland. Paul Jones was armed with 16 guns and had a crew of 85 men under the command of Captain Archibald Taylor. She had been out two months and had captured three prizes.)

Year	Master	Owner	Trade	Source
1816	Furguson	J.Bolton	Liverpool–Demerara	LR
1818	Furguson; J.Scott	J.Bolton	Liverpool–Demerara; Liverpool–Calcutta	LR

In 1813 the British East India Company (EIC) had lost its monopoly on the trade between India and Britain. British ships were then free to sail to India or the Indian Ocean under a licence from the EIC.

William Dawson sailed in April 1818 for Bengal. On 19 July 1818, she was at the Cape of Good Hope, on her way to Bengal. On 2 August she arrived at Bengal. In January 1819, Lloyd's List reported that a heavily laden vessel had run foul of William Dawson, Scott, master, in the Hooghly River. William Dawson had to go into dock for repairs. She sailed from the Sand Heads on 19 November, the Cape on 13 January 1820, and arrived at Liverpool on 22 March. Here cargo included sugar, saltpeter, ginger, wheat, and the like.

Year	Master	Owner	Trade	Source & notes
1819	J.Scott; W.Brown	J.Bolton	Liverpool–Calcutta; Liverpool–Demerara	LR; repairs 1819
1821	W.Brown; Gradwell; J.Bamber	Bolton & Co.	Liverpool–Demerara	LR; repairs 1819

On 25 August 1822 William Dawson, Bamber, master, put into St. Pierre, Martinique. She had been on her way from Demerara to Liverpool when she lost her masts on 21 August between Barbados and Martinique. She had sailed from Demerara on 15 August. She sailed from Martinique on 9 September and arrived at Liverpool on 21 October

Year	Master	Owner	Trade	Source & notes
1823	J.Bamber; Hutchinson	Bolton & Co.	Liverpool–Demerara	LR; repairs 1819
1824	Hutchinson	Hurry & Co.	Liverpool–Miramichi	LR; repairs 1819

By one report, on 8 May 1824 Matthew and Thomas foundered in the Atlantic Ocean. William Dawson rescued all aboard. However, Lloyd's List only reported that she had arrived at Holyhead from Miramichi, having spoke with several vessels, including Matthew and Thomas before Matthew and Thomas had foundered.

Year	Master	Owner	Trade	Source & notes
1825	Hutchinson	Hurry & Co.	Liverpool–New Brunswick	LR; repairs 1819
1826	Hutchinson	Gibson & Co.	Liverpool–Boston	LR; repairs 1819
1827	Hutchinson	Gibson & Co.	Liverpool–Quebec	LR; repairs 1819
1828	Hutchinson	Gibson & Co.	Liverpool–Charleston	LR; repairs 1819
1829	Hutchinson; E.Mitchell	Gibson & Co.	Liverpool–Charleston	LR; repairs 1819
1829	E.Mitchell	Gibson & Co.	Liverpool–New Brunswick	LR; repairs 1819
1831	E.Mitchell	Mitchell & Co.	Liverpool–Miramichi	LR; repairs 1819

On 14 July 1831 William Dawson, Mitchell, master, on her way from Miramichi to Shields, went on shore at Goswick, near Holy Island.

Year	Master	Owner	Trade	Source & notes
1832	E.Mitchell	Mitchell & Co.	Liverpool–Miramichi	LR; repairs 1819, & new wales and damages repaired 1832
1833	E.Mitchell	Mitchell & Co.	Leith–Alloa	LR; repairs 1819, & new wales and damages repaired 1832
1834	Beveridge	Mitchell & Co.	Leith–Miramichi	LR; large repair 1832 & new deck 1834
1836	Beveridge	Mitchell & Co.	Clyde–Quebec; Leith–North America	LR; large repair 1832, new deck 1834, & some repairs 1836

On 20 April 1836 William Dawson, Beveridge, master, had to put into Greenock as she had sprung a leak. She was on her way from Alloa to Quebec.

Year	Master	Owner	Trade	Source & notes
1838	Beveridge	Mitchell & Co.	Leith–North America	LR; large repair 1832, new deck 1834, some repairs 1836, & new keel and some repairs 1838

On 19 May 1841 a gale at Quebec severely damaged William Dawson.

Year	Master	Owner	Trade	Source & notes
1843	Beveridge	Mitchell & Co.	Leith–North America	LR; large repair 1832, new deck 1834, some repairs 1836, new keel and some repairs 1838, & new deck and large repair 1844
1846	Beveridge; D.Spitall	Mitchell & Co.	Leith–North America; Leith–Baltimore	LR; large repair 1832, new deck 1834, some repairs 1836, new keel and some repairs 1838, new deck and large repair 1844, & some repairs 1847
1848	J.White	Mitchell & Co.	Clyde–New Brunswick	LR; large repair 1832, new deck 1834, some repairs 1836, new keel and some repairs 1838, new deck and large repair 1844, & some repairs 1847
1850	J.White	Mitchell		LR
1851	T.Beveridge	Mitchell & Co.	Leith–Quebec	LR; large repair 1832, new deck 1834, some repairs 1836, new keel and some repairs 1838, new deck and large repair 1844, & some repairs 1847 & 1851
1853	T.Beveridge	Mitchell & Co.		LR
1854	R.Mitchell	Mitchell & Co.	Leith–Quebec	LR; new deck and large repair 1844, & some repairs 1847 & 1851
1857	W.Ness	Mitchell & Co.	Leith–Quebec	LR; new deck and large repair 1844, some repairs 1847 & 1851, & damages repaired 1855
1859	W.Ness	Mitchell		LR

== Fate ==
William Dawson was last listed in the volume of Lloyd's Register for 1859.
