= Young William (1779 ship) =

History

Great Britain
- Name: Young William
- Owner: 1779:George Atty; 1785–1805:Various; 1814:Hall & Co.
- Builder: Whitby
- Launched: 1779
- Fate: Wrecked 1815

General characteristics
- Tons burthen: 431, or 500 (bm)
- Armament: 6 × 9-pounder guns + 2 × 12-pounder carronades

Young William was launched at Whitby in 1779. Initially, she was a West Indiaman. Later she traded more widely, particularly to Russia and the Baltic. She was captured and recaptured in 1814 and was lost on Nargon Island in 1815.

== Career ==
Young William appeared in Lloyd's Register (LR) in 1781 with G. Hastings, master, Atty & Cop., owners, and trade London–Jamaica.

Year	Master	Owner	Trade	Source & notes
1786	R.Johnson	Captain & Co.	Antigua–London; London–Petersburg	LR
1790	R.Johnson	J.Clark & Co.	London–Virginia	LR
1795	R.Stamp	Middleton	Hull–Onega, Russia	LR; damages repaired 1789
1800	R.Stampe	Middleton	London-Riga	LR; damages repaired 1789 & good repair 1795
1805	W.Irvine	Middleton	Liverpool–New Brunswick	LR; good repair 1795
1810	W.P.Irvine	Middleton	Liverpool–New Brunswick	Register of Shipping (RS); large repair 1799
1814	Stephenson	Hall & Co.	Plymouth–Quebec	RS; large repair 1811 & damages repaired 1813

On 9 September 1814 the American privateer Surprise captured Young William, of Hull, Stevenson, master, as Young William was sailing from London to Halifax, Nova Scotia. HMS Plover recaptured Young William and took her into St John's, Newfoundland. American records describe Young William as being armed with 10 guns, having a crew of 17 men, and carrying a cargo of bread.

The Register of Shipping for 1816 showed Young William with Stephenson, master, Hall & Co., owners, and trade London–Hamburg. She had undergone a thorough repair in 1811 and repairs for damages in 1813.

== Fate ==
Young William, Stephenson, master, was wrecked on 7 November 1815 on Nargoon Island while on a voyage from Saint Petersburg to London. Her crew were rescued.
