= Antoinetta (1812 ship) =

US and UK merchant ship and whaler 1812–1827

History

United States
- Name: Antionette or Marie Antoinette
- Builder: America
- Launched: 1812
- Captured: December 1813

United Kingdom
- Name: Antoinetta, or Antonietta, or Antoinietta, or Antoinette
- Owner: 1814-1818:Rains & Co.; 1818-1826:W. Achkers (or Akers)
- Acquired: 1814 by purchase of a prize
- Fate: No longer listed in Lloyd's Register in 1827

General characteristics
- Type: Schooner
- Tons burthen: 240, or 250 (bm)
- Propulsion: Sail
- Complement: 20 (at capture)
- Armament: 2 guns (at capture)

Antoinetta was a schooner launched in 1812 in America, possibly as Marie Antoinette, and captured in late 1813. New owners renamed her Antoinetta. She performed two sealing or whaling voyages between 1814 and 1818. Thereafter she traded between London and Trinidad; she was no longer listed after 1826.

== Career ==
=== Capture ===
On 18 December 1813 HMS Royalist drove Antoinette ashore in the Basque Roads as Antoinette was on a voyage from Philadelphia, Pennsylvania to Bordeaux, Gironde, France. Antoinette was later refloated and taken in to Plymouth, Devon. (Note: The prize money announcement gave the schooner's name as Marie Antoinette, and reported that Royalist had to share the prize with the other vessels of the British Royal Navy that were part of the Basque Roads squadron. A first-class share of the prize money was worth £230 8s 3d; a sixth-class share, that of an ordinary seaman, was worth £1 10s 1½d.)

=== Sealing voyage ===
Under the command of Folger, master, Antoinetta (or Antonietta) left Britain on 23 August 1814. She returned on 22 July 1816 with 156 casks of oil and 9,000 skins.

=== Whaling voyage ===
Antoinette, R. Folger, master, departed Nantucket in 1816 with a destination of Patagonia. She was recorded as having gathered 1000 barrels of sperm oil. Lloyd's Register shows her master changing from Folger to Rochester.

=== Merchantman ===
In 1818 Antoinetta's master changed from Rochester to R. Bibby, her owner from Rains to W. Ackers, and her trade from London-Buenos Aires to unspecified. In 1819 her trade became London-Trinidad. Antoinetta was last listed in Lloyd's Register in 1826 with H. Biddy, master, W. Achers, owner, and trade London-Trinidad.
