= Broxbornebury (1812 ship) =

British sailing ship

History

United Kingdom
- Name: Broxbornebury
- Namesake: Broxbornebury Estate, Broxbourne, Hertfordshire
- Owner: Andrew Timbrell, then Andrew Chapman
- Port of registry: London
- Builder: Thomas Pitcher, Northfleet
- Launched: 1812, Northfleet
- Fate: Condemned in 1843

General characteristics
- Tons burthen: 70883/94, or 709, or 720, or 757 (bm)
- Length: 132 ft 6 5/8 in (40.4 m) (overall), 105 ft 9 in (32.2 m) (keel)
- Beam: 35 ft 6 in (10.8 m)
- Depth of hold: 18 ft 6 in (5.6 m)
- Propulsion: Sail
- Sail plan: Full-rigged ship
- Complement: 1812:82; 1814:60
- Armament: 1812:20 × 18-pounder guns; 1814:14 × 18-pounder guns

Broxbornebury (or Broxonbury), was a three-decker sailing ship launched in 1812. She made four voyages for the East India Company (EIC), one voyage transporting convicts to Australia, and numerous other sailing voyages. She was sold in 1844 for breaking up.

== EIC Voyage #1 ==
Pitcher had built Broxbornebury for Andrew Timbrell, who thus was her first owner. The East India Company took up Broxbornebury soon after her launching.

Because she was launched during the Napoleonic Wars, the EIC arranged for her captain, Thomas Pitcher, to be issued a letter of marque, which it commonly did for many of its East Indiamen. Pitcher received the letter on 10 April 1812. This gave her the right to capture enemy vessels, civilian and military, even when not engaging in self-defense.

Pitcher sailed from Falmouth on 15 May 1812, reached Madeira on 3 June, and Kedgeree on 28 October. For her return voyage to Britain, Broxbornebury passed Saugor on 29 December. She was at Madras on 7 February 1813, and Colombo on 3 March. She reached St Helena on 13 June, and Gravesend on 12 August.

In 1813, Timbrell sold Broxbornebury to Andrew Chapman, and she left the EIC's service. From then until 1825 she traded privately on the London-India route as a licensed ship.

== Convict transport ==
Under the command of Thomas Pitcher Jr., Broxbornebury sailed from London, England on 22 February 1814, with 120 female convicts, plus passengers and cargo. Among the convicts were women who had sailed on Emu, which an American privateer had captured and left at Cape Verde, from where they were repatriated back to prison hulks at London. Some of the passengers were free women, whose husbands were convicts, and their children. Broxbornebury sailed in company with Surrey (or Surry), which too was transporting convicts to Australia, particularly the husbands of the free women on Broxbornebury. However, once the vessels reached the Atlantic they lost touch with each other. Ship fever (Typhus) broke out aboard Surrey. On 25 July the two vessels fortuitously encountered each other off the coast of New South Wales. By this time the fever had killed or incapacitated many on board Surrey, including all the officers, so Pitcher sent a volunteer seaman to take command. Two days later both vessels were able to enter Port Jackson. Surrey remained in quarantine for some time.

On Broxbornebury two female convicts had died on the voyage. Broxbornebury left Port Jackson on 16 November bound for Batavia.

== EIC voyages 2 to 4 ==
Andrew Chapman was still Broxbornebury's owner in 1825 when the EIC chartered her again. She then performed three voyages for the company.

=== EIC voyage #2 ===
Captain Thomas Fewson left the Downs on 8 June 1825, bound for Madras, Bengal, and China. Broxbornebury reached Madras on 29 September, and Diamond Harbour on 29 September. She left Diamond Harbour on 18 October, reaching Kamree Roads on 1 December, and Penang on 24 December. About a week later, on 2 January 1826, she was at Malacca, and then five days after that at Singapore. She reached Whampoa on 12 March. For the return trip she left Macao on 10 April, reaching St Helena on 1 August and the Downs on 23 September.

=== EIC voyage #3 ===
For this voyage, the EIC chartered Broxbornebury at a rate of £13 18s 0d per ton.

Fewson left the Downs on 15 April 1827, bound for China, and reached Whampoa on 10 August. Broxbornebury crossed the Second Bar on 12 October at the start of her return voyage. She reached St Helena on 31 December and Long Reach on 28 February 1828.

=== EIC voyage #4 ===
For Broxbornebury's fourth and last voyage for the EIC, the EIC chartered her for one voyage to China, Halifax, and Quebec at a rate of £9 8s 0d per ton.

Captain Robert Brown Shettler (or Shittler), left the Downs on 21 June 1832. Broxbornebury reached Whampoa on 7 November. She left on 28 January 1833, reaching St Helena on 8 April. From there she sailed to Quebec, which she reached on 29 May. By 30 August she had returned to her moorings in England.

== Subsequent career ==
In 1839 Chapman sold Broxbornebury to J. Ritchie, London. He, in turn, sold her in 1841 to Phillips & Co.

Year	Master	Owner	Trade	Source & note
1841	Chapman; Burnett	J.Ritchie; Phillips & Co.	London–Bombay	LR; small repairs 1836 $1841, and large repair 1839

== Fate ==
Broxbornebury was condemned in 1843 at Mauritius after being damaged in a storm while on a voyage from Bombay to London. She was sold the next year for breaking up. Her entry in the 1843 volume of Lloyd's Register carried the annotation "Condemned".
