= HMS Arab (1812) =

History

United Kingdom
- Name: HMS Arab
- Ordered: 24 October 1811
- Builder: John Pelham, Frindsbury
- Launched: 22 August 1812
- Commissioned: September 1812
- Fate: Wrecked 18 December 1823

General characteristics
- Class & type: Cruizer-class brig-sloop
- Tons burthen: 38992/94 (bm)
- Length: Overall: 99 ft 7 1/4 in (30.4 m); Keel: 78 ft 1 3/8 in (23.8 m)
- Beam: 30 ft 7 5/8 in (9.3 m)
- Depth of hold: 12 ft 9 1/2 in (3.9 m)
- Complement: 121
- Armament: 16 × 32-pounder carronades + 2 × 6-pounder bow chasers

HMS Arab was launched in 1812. She had a relatively uneventful career until she was wrecked on 18 December 1823 with the loss of all aboard.

== Career ==
Commander John Wilson commissioned Arab in September 1812.

In October 1812 Arab was ordered to Yarmouth to take onboard the Spanish Ambassador to the Court of Saint Petersburg. She was also to take 20 pilots to assist the Russian fleet to exit the Baltic and join the British in an expedition against the coast of France. On 1 November 1812 the Spanish Ambassador boarded Arab, to the accompaniment of a 15-gun salute. She then sailed from Yarmouth. When she returned from Russia she brought home from Gothenburg the news of the burning of Moscow and the commencement of Napoleon's retreat.

Arab sailed for the Leeward Islands on 13 December 1812. She escorted a convoy to Barbados. Shortly after she arrived, Captain Wilson, who had already been suffering from ill health, had to leave Arab to go to sick quarters. Lieutenant Robert Standly, the officer next on the Admiralty's list of officers for promotion, became acting captain.

In April 1813, Arab detained four vessels under Swedish colours, two of which were condemned. Because the prize agent went bankrupt, no money was ever received for them.

Commander Henry Jane was appointed on 5 July 1813 to command of Arab, on the Halifax station.

On 3 November, off Cape Sambro, Arab captured the American privateer schooner Industry, T. Rice, master. Of five guns and 26 men, Industry was 14 days out of Marblehead.

Arab, Maidstone, Curlew, and Junon shared in the detention, on 23 November of Firmina, of 260 tons (bm), Antonio Jose Fereira, master. She had been sailing from Boston to Amelia Island in ballast. The Vice admiralty court in Halifax restored her to her owners.

Arab recaptured Three Williams, which the United States privateer Grand Turk had captured in October, and sent Three Williams into Halifax, Nova Scotia, where she arrived on 18 February 1815. (Note: An earlier report in Lloyd's List stated that Industry had arrived at Halifax between 30 October and 7 November.) The records of the Vice admiralty court in Halifax show that the recaptured Three Williams had first come into Shelburne, Nova Scotia. Three Williams, Whiteway, master, had a cargo of 1,900 quintals of dried fish.

From 1815 to 1816 Arab served on the Halifax station. On 3 December 1815 Arab arrived at Barbados with the mail from Halifax.

In 1817 Arab was at Plymouth. Between November 1818 and February 1819 she underwent small repair. On 2 November 1818, Commander Charles Simeon recommissioned Arab for the Cork station.

By March 1822 Commander William Holmes was captain of Arab on the Cork station.

== Fate ==
On 12 December 1823 Arab was wrecked off Belmullet near Broadhaven in the west of Ireland. All on board were lost. She had been driven ashore during a storm.
