= Atlas (1812 ship) =

UK merchant ship 1812–1831

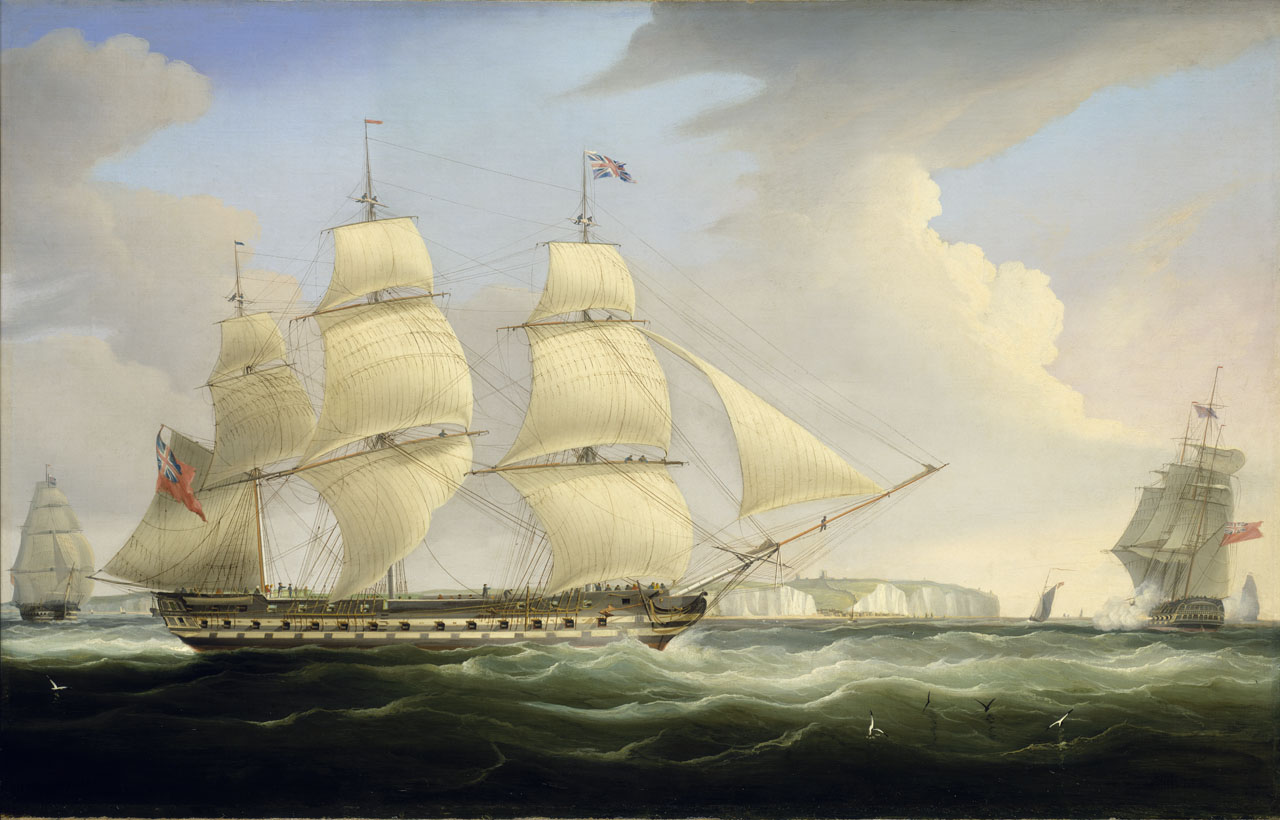
- Atlas, in three views off South Foreland, near Dover, in 1826

History

United Kingdom
- Name: Atlas
- Namesake: Atlas
- Owner: EIC voyages #1-3: John Staniforth; EIC voyages 4-6: Jasper Vaux; EIC voyages:7-9 Charles Otway Mayne
- Builder: Thomas Steemson, Paull, Hull
- Launched: 8 October 1812
- Fate: Sold 1831 for breaking up

General characteristics
- Tons burthen: 1267, or 126726/94, or 1291 (bm)
- Length: Overall:165 ft 8 1/2 in (50.5 m); Keel:134 ft 0 in (40.8 m)
- Beam: 42 ft 2 in (12.9 m)
- Depth of hold: 17 ft 0 in (5.2 m)
- Complement: EIC:130; Letter of Marque:140
- Armament: EIC:26 guns; Letter of Marque:38 × 18-pounder guns

Atlas was launched at Kingston upon Hull in 1812 as an East Indiaman. She made nine voyages to India or China for the British East India Company (EIC) before she was sold in 1831 for breaking up.

== Career ==
On 10 July 1811 the EIC contracted with Messers. Staniforth and Blunt for the building of a vessel of 1200 tons (bm) at Paul, near Hull. They agreed a rate of £18 5s per ton for six voyages, and £5 19s per ton building allowance.

Atlas was launched in October 1812. On 24 December Captain Charles Otway Mayne acquired a letter of marque. He would remain captain of Atlas for all six of these voyages.

=== 1st EIC voyage (1813–1814) ===
Atlas sailed from Portsmouth on 29 January 1813, bound for Madras and China. On 7 May she was at Simons Bay, and on 7 July she reached Madras. She was at Penang on 17 August and Malacca on 8 September, and arrived at Whampoa anchorage on 19 October. Homeward bound, she was at Lintin on 20 February 1814, reached St Helena on 26 May, and arrived back at Blackwall on 20 August.

=== 2nd EIC voyage (1815–1816) ===
Atlas sailed from Portsmouth on 28 February 1815, bound for Madras and China. She reached Madras on 22 July, Penang on 1 September, and Malacca on 23 September. She arrived at Whampoa on 30 October. Homeward bound, she crossed the Second Bar on 24 December, reached St Helena on 26 May 1816, and arrived at Blackwall on 17 May.

When Atlas arrived back at London she discharged her crew, including her Chinese sailors hired in Canton. Princess Amelia repatriated 23 to Canton, together with 357 others, leaving the Downs on 20 July 1816.

=== 3rd EIC voyage (1817–1818) ===
Atlas sailed from Portsmouth on 14 March 1817, bound for Madras, Bengal, and China. She reached Madras on 24 June and arrived at the New Anchorage (near Diamond Harbour and Kedgeree on 9 July. Continuing her voyage, Atlas was at Saugor on 31 August and Malacca on 27 September. She arrived at Whampoa on 25 November. Homeward bound, she was below the Second Bar by 7 January 1818, at St Helena on 1 April, and in East India Docks on 16 June.

=== 4th EIC voyage (1819–1820) ===
(4) 1818/9 Bengal and China. Capt Charles Otway Mayne. Atlas sailed from Portsmouth on 1 March 1819, bound for Bengal and China. She arrived at the New Anchorage on 9 July. Continuing her voyage, Atlas was at Penang on 8 October and Malacca on 18 October. She arrived at Whampoa on 217 december. Homeward bound, she was below the Second Bar by 2 February 1818, at St Helena on 19 April, and in East India Dock on 1 July.

=== 5th EIC voyage (1821–1822) ===
Atlas sailed from The Downs on 23 January 1821, bound for Bengal and China. She arrived at the New Anchorage on 24 May. Continuing her voyage, Atlas was at Penang on 8 September and Singapore on 19 September; she arrived at Whampoa on 11 October. Homeward bound, she crossed the Second Bar on- 15 January 1822, reached St Helena on 30 June, and arrived back at East India Dock on 3 September.

On this voyage Captain Otway brought back from China a number of Chrysanthemums that were new to the Horticultural Society of London.

=== 6th EIC voyage (1823–1824) ===
(6) 1822/3 Madras and China. Capt Charles Otway Mayne. Atlas sailed from Plymouth on 15 March 1823, bound for Madras and China. She reached Madras on 22 June, Penang on 18 August, Malacca on 4 September, and Singapore on 11 September. She arrived at Whampoa on 2 October. Homeward bound, she crossed the Second Bar on 29 November, reached St Helena on 20 March 1824, and arrived at Blackwall on 25 May.

Atlas's owner, Jasper Vaux, died in 1823. Charles Otway Mayne purchased her from the Executors of Vaux's estate. On 18 August 1824, the EIC agreed with Captain Mayne to employ Atlas for three more voyages as a regular ship at a rate of £18 5s per ton for 1200 tons. Otway turned over command of Atlas to Captain John Hine, who then sailed her on her last three voyages.

=== 7th EIC voyage (1825–1826) ===
Atlas sailed from Plymouth on 2 March 1825, bound for Madras and China. She reached Madras on 3 June, Penang on 11 August, Malacca on 29 August, and Singapore on 3 September. She arrived at Whampoa on 25 September. Homeward bound, she was at the Cape on 14 February 1826, reached St Helena on 16 March 1824, and arrived at Blackwall on 18 May.

=== 8th EIC voyage (1827–1828) ===
(8) 1826/7 St Helena, Bombay and China. Capt John Hine. Atlas sailed from Portsmouth on 17 January 1827, bound for St Helena, Bombay, and China. She was at St Helena on 14 Mar and reached Bombay on 13 June. Continuing on her voyage, she reached Penang on 26 August and arrived at Whampoa on 5 October. Homeward bound, she crossed the Second Bar on 24 December, reached the Cape on 13 March 1828 and St Helena on 7 April, and arrived at East India Dock on 10 June.

=== 9th EIC voyage (1829–1830) ===
Atlas sailed from Portsmouth on 7 March 1829, bound for Bombay and China. She reached Bombay on 3 July and Singapore on 9 September; she arrived at Whampoa on 9 February 1830. Homeward bound, on 3 April Atlas encountered Bridgewater, which had been badly damaged in a gale. Atlas chaperoned Bridgewater to Madras. Atlas reached St Helena on 15 June and arrived at Gravesend on 4 August.

== Fate ==
Otway sold Atlas on 20 May 1831 for £4100 to Charles Carter for breaking up.

== Post script ==
Atlas was one of six ships featured on a series of commemorative stamps issued in 2013 honouring Britain's merchant ships. The other five vessels on the series are: RMS Britannia (1840), Cutty Sark (1870), SS Clan Matheson (1919), RMS Queen Elizabeth (1940), and Lord Hinton (1986).
