= Creole (1812 ship) =

History

United Kingdom
- Name: Creole
- Builder: Michael Smith, Calcutta
- Launched: 1812
- Fate: Wrecked 1816

General characteristics
- Tons burthen: 230, or 232 (bm)

Creole was launched in 1812 at Calcutta. She sailed between India and Mauritius and India and South East Asia. She was wrecked at Java in 1816.

Fate: Lloyd's List reported on 11 March 1817 that Creole, of Calcutta, was wrecked on the island of Gilion (or Galion; now Pulau Giliyang, Java), but that her was crew saved. The loss may have occurred in February 1816.
