= Emu (1812 ship) =

Australian convict ship

History

United Kingdom
- Name: Emu
- Namesake: Emu
- Owner: 1812:W.Hurry
- Launched: 1812, Liverpool
- Captured: 30 November 1812

General characteristics
- Class & type: Brig, or Snow
- Tons burthen: 182, or 220 (bm)
- Propulsion: Sail
- Complement: 21
- Armament: Register:14 × 18-pounder carronades; Letter of marque: 16 × 12&6-pounder guns

Emu was a merchant ship built at Liverpool in 1812 that transported convicts to Australia. An American privateer captured her in 1812 as she was carrying female convicts to Van Diemen's Land.

== Career ==
Governor Lachlan Macquarie requested on 30 April 1810 that the British Government supply the colony with two brigs for the colony's use that would not be subject to the control of the Admiralty. The British government provided Emu and Kangaroo.

Emu was launched at Liverpool in 1812. She entered the Register of Shipping (RS) in the 1813 volume as a brig built in Liverpool in 1812. Her master was A. Hall, her owner was W. Hurry, and her trade was London–Botany Bay.

Lieutenant Alexander Bisset received a letter of marque for Emu on 21 September 1812. Emu left England in October 1812 with 49 female convicts.

Emu, Bissett, master, parted from her convoy and its escort, HMS Java, on 24 November.

While she was en route to Hobart Town, the American 18-gun privateer Holkar, Captain J. Rolland, captured her on 30 November 1812 in the Atlantic. Holkar put Emu's 22 crew and the 49 female convicts ashore on 17 January 1813 at Porto Grande on the island of St Vincent (now São Vicente) in the Cape Verde Islands. LL reported on 16 April 1813 that Holkar had captured Emu, of 10 guns and 25 men, on 16 November, and put crew and convicts ashore at Cape Verde on 15 January 1813.

A prize crew took Emu to Newport, Rhode Island where arrived at about 10 February. Her captors sold Emu at Newport.

After 12 months Isabella picked up Emu's captain, crew, and convicts and returned them to England. The convicts were placed on a hulk in Portsmouth harbour and subsequently sent aboard the transport Broxbornebury to Port Jackson.

A United States newspaper report stated that Emu was a "king's ship", of 12 guns, and carrying a great quantity of ammunition. She also had a patented anti-boarder in defence in the form of bayonets on springs afixed to her bulwarks. The newspaper also reported that the arrogant commander, a naval lieutenant, could not persuade his crew to resist Holkar. The news item did not mention the female convicts.
