= Bridgewater (1812 EIC ship) =

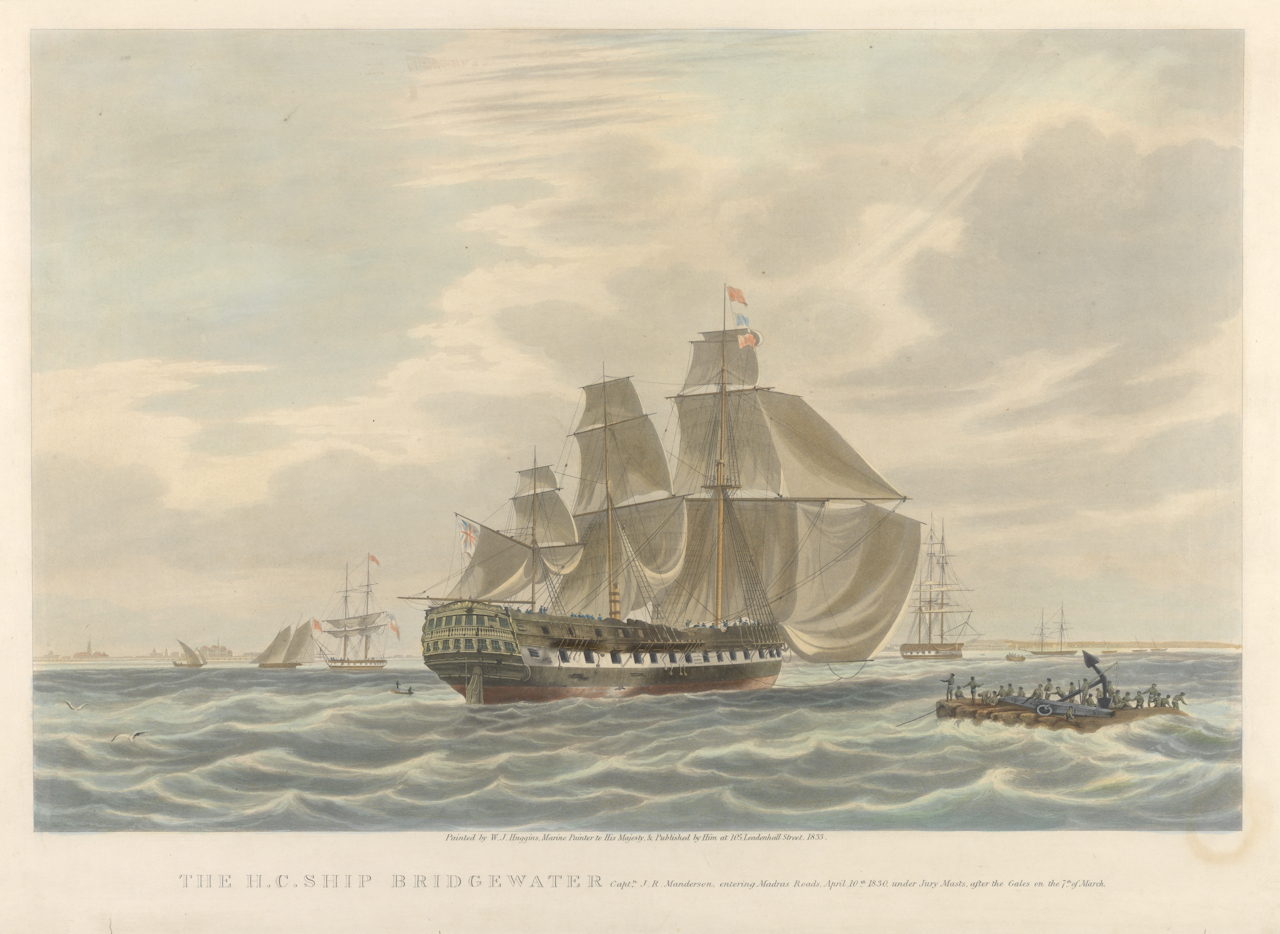
- The H.C. Ship Bridgewater Capt J.R. Manderson, entering Madras Roads April 10th 1830 under Jury Masts, after the Gales of the 7th of March, William John Huggins, National Maritime Museum, Greenwich

History

United Kingdom
- Name: Bridgewater
- Owner: James Sims
- Builder: Randall, Brent & Gray, Rotherhithe
- Launched: 5 October 1812
- Fate: Condemned 1830 and sold 1831 for breaking up

General characteristics
- Tons burthen: 1276, or 127650/94, or 1349 (bm)
- Length: Overall:166 ft 5 in (50.7 m); Keel:135 ft 8 5/8 in (41.4 m)
- Beam: 42 ft 2 1/2 in (12.9 m)
- Depth of hold: 17 ft 0 1/1 in (5.2 m)
- Sail plan: Full-rigged ship
- Complement: 129
- Armament: 26 × 18-pounder guns + 12 × 18-pounder carronades
- Notes: Three decks

Bridgewater was launched in 1812 as an East Indiaman for the British East India Company (EIC). She made eight voyages to India and China for the EIC. A hurricane dismasted her as she was homeward bound on her ninth voyage. She was surveyed at Calcutta in 1830, condemned, and sold for breaking up in 1831.

== Career ==
=== EIC voyage #1 (1813–1814) ===
Captain Philip Hughes acquired a letter of marque on 30 October 1812. He sailed from Portsmouth on 29 January 1813, bound for Madras and China. Bridgewater reached the Cape of Good Hope on 7 May and arrived at Madras on 7 July. She was at Penang on 17 August and Malacca on 8 September before arriving at Whampoa Anchorage on 25 October. Homeward bound, she crossed the Second Bar on 21 February 1814, reached St Helena on 26 May, and arrived at Long Reach on 11 August.

=== EIC voyage #2 (1815–1816) ===
Captain Hughes sailed from Portsmouth on 28 February 1815, bound for Madras and China. Bridgewater reached Madras on 22 July, was at Penang on 1 September and Malacca on 21 September, and arrived at Whampoa on 29 October. Homeward bound, she crossed the Second Bar on 24 December, reached St Helena on 26 March 1816, and arrived at Long Reach on 15 May.

When Bridgewater arrived back at London she discharged her crew, including her Chinese sailors hired in Canton. Princess Amelia repatriated 19 to Canton, together with 361 others, leaving the Downs on 20 July 1816.

=== EIC voyage #3 (1817–1818) ===
Captain Hughes sailed from Portsmouth on 14 March 1817, bound for Madras and China. Bridgewater reached Madras on 26 June, was at Penang on 6 August, and arrived at Whampoa on 26 September. Homeward bound, she crossed the Second Bar on 3 December, reached the Cape on 12 March 1818 and St Helena on 28 March 1816, and arrived at Long Reach on 4 June.

=== EIC voyage #4 (1819–1820) ===
Captain Charles Sheldon Timins sailed from the Downs on 22 April 1819, bound for St Helena and China. Bridgewater was at St Helena on 4 July and Penang on 30 September. She arrived at Whampoa on 6 December. Homeward bound, she crossed the Second Bar on 30 January 1820, and was at Macao on 16 February. She reached St Helena on 19 April and arrived at Long Reach on 23 June.

=== EIC voyage #5 (1821–1822) ===
Captain William Mitchell sailed from the Downs on 28 April 1821, bound for China. Bridgewater was at Penang on 11 August, Malacca on 2 September, and Singapore on 5 September. She arrived at Whampoa on 5 October. Homeward bound, she crossed the Second Bar on 14 January 1822. She left China on 22 March, reached St Helena on 24 June, and arrived at Long Reach on 18 August.

=== EIC voyage #6 (1823–1824) ===
Captain Mitchell sailed from the Downs on 27 February 1823, bound for St Helena, Bombay, and China. While Bridgewater was at sea on 29 April she was at 18°42′S 4°0′W when a small mutiny broke out that Mitchell and his officers suppressed. Bridgewater arrived at St Helena on 30 April. There the Governor mounted a court of inquiry that in May found that a mutiny had indeed occurred and ordered that the ringleaders be sent back to England for trial. Bridgewater arrived in Bombay on 8 July. She reached Singapore on 13 September and arrived at Whampoa on 6 October. Homeward bound, she crossed the Second Bar on 7 December, reached St Helena on 10 March, and arrived at Blackwall on 6 May.

=== EIC voyage #7 (1825–1826) ===
Captain John Rennie Manderson sailed from Portsmouth on 27 January 1825, bound for Bengal and China. Bridgewater arrived at Balasore on 24 May. She was at Penang on 15 August, Malacca on 29 August, and Singapore on 4 September; she arrived at Whampoa on 26 September. She left Whampoa on 18 November, reached St Helena on 2 February 1826, and arrived at Long Reach on 4 April.

=== EIC voyage #8 (1827–1828) ===
Captain Manderson sailed from the Downs on 4 January 1827, bound for Bombay and China. Bridgewater arrived at Bombay on 7 May, reached Singapore on 29 July, and arrived at Whampoa on 10 August. Homeward bound, she crossed the Second Bar on 12 October, reached St Helena on 24 January 1828, and arrived at Blackwall on 16 March.

=== EIC voyage #9 (1829–1831) ===
Captain Manderson sailed from the Downs on 11 January 1829, bound for Bengal and China. She reached Saugor on 30 April. She was at Penang on 10 July, and arrived at Whampoa on 16 August. Homeward bound, she crossed the Second Bar on 23 November, and was at Macao on 31 January 1830.

She was caught in hurricane at 20°S 90°E between 5 and 8 March that dismasted her and left her in a leaky state. During the hurricane the crew threw three quarterdeck guns over board, and 50 chests of tea. Manderson called a council of his officers and some passengers. The decision was that Bridgewater could not survive another hurricane and that she could not risk attempting to reach Île de France; the only option was to try to reach Ceylon, or the nearest Indian port. After the hurricane, they threw another 16 guns overboard, as well as another 50 chests of tea.

On 3 April Bridgewater encountered Atlas, which chaperoned Bridgewater to Madras. Bridgewater reached Madras on 11 April, with the crew, somewhat reduced by injuries suffered during the hurricane, continuing to man the pumps. She then made her way to Calcutta, which she reached on 8 May.

== Fate ==
Bridgewater was surveyed in dock at Calcutta and condemned. On 31 May 1831 she was sold for breaking up.
