= Cossack (1812 ship) =

History

United Kingdom
- Name: Cossack
- Builder: Sunderland
- Launched: 1812
- Captured: 16 October 1814

General characteristics
- Tons burthen: 208 (bm)
- Armament: 2 × 4-pounder guns

Cossack was launched in 1812 in Sunderland and first appeared in Lloyd's Register (LR) in 1813.

Year	Master	Owner	Trade	Source
1813	J.Black	A.Sinclair	London–Newfoundland	LR

Cossack, Black, master, a brig of Greenock, had been sailing from Alicante to Newfoundland when on 16 October 1814, the privateer Grand Turk captured her. Grand Turk transferred a considerable quantity of raisins from Cossack before sending her for the United States.

HMS Bulwark recaptured Cossack, only to have Cossack fall prey to the US privateer Surprise. Cossack arrived at Salem, Massachusetts on 16 November. Cossack was carrying a cargo of wine. She was sold at Salem for $12,500.

When Captain Green, of Grand Turk reached Salem he was delighted to see Cossack anchored there. He was then chagrined to discover that she had become a prize to a rival privateer.

The Register of Shipping (RS) carried the annotation "CAPTURED" by Cossack's name in its volume for 1815.
