= Lascelles (1812 ship) =

History

United Kingdom
- Name: Lascelles
- Owner: J. Foster & Co.
- Builder: Hull, or Selby
- Launched: 1812
- Captured: 1813

General characteristics
- Tons burthen: 116 (bm)
- Sail plan: Brig
- Armament: 2 × 4-pounder guns

Lascelles was a brig built at Hull, or Selby in 1812. Her master was Gascoigne. She traded as a coaster, and between Cork and Spain or England.

The French privateer Telemachus captured Lascelles, Gascoigne, master, and she arrived in Calais on 19 December 1813. (Note: Télémaque was a privateer commissioned in Dunkirk in October 1812 under Captain Jacques-Joseph Calcius, with 55 men and 14 cannon (eight guns and six carronnades). She was decommissioned in Dieppe in May 1813.) When captured Lascelles had been sailing from Cork to London with 570 tierces of beef and 170 tierces of pork. Lloyd's Register for 1815 has the annotation "captured" beneath her name.
