= List of ship launches in 1810 =

The list of ship launches in 1810 includes a chronological list of some ships launched in 1810.

Date	Ship	Class	Builder	Location	Country	Notes
13 January	Krym	Corvette	A. I. Melikhov	Sevastopol	Russia	For Imperial Russian Navy.
15 January	Nymphe	Pallas-class frigate		Nantes	France	For French Navy.
22 January	Everthorp	Full-rigged ship	Gleadow	Hull	United Kingdom	For G. & J. Eggington.
22 January	Primrose	Brig of war	Nicholas Diddams	Portsmouth Dockyard	United Kingdom	For Royal Navy.
22 January	Pyramus	Pyramus-class frigate		Portsmouth Dockyard	United Kingdom	For Royal Navy.
23 January	John	Merchantman	Shepherd	Hull	United Kingdom	For Marshall, Cooper & Co.
7 February	Charles Grant	East Indiaman		Bombay Dockyard	India	For British East India Company.
12 February	Earl of Lonsdale	West Indiaman		Whitehaven	United Kingdom	For Stitt & Co.
19 February	Mouche No. 29	Mouche No. 2-class schooner-aviso	Antoine Crucy	Nantes	France	For French Navy.
21 February	Vigo	Vengeur-class ship of the line	Charles Ross	Rochester	United Kingdom	For Royal Navy.
24 February	Pigmy	Pigmy-class schooner	John King	Upnor	United Kingdom	For Royal Navy.
February	Afriqiya	Fifth rate	Hajj Umar	Alexandria	(Ottoman Empire) Egypt	For Egyptian Navy.
1 March	Fanny	West Indiaman	Daniel & Samuel Brent	Rotherhithe	United Kingdom	For F. Chalmers & Co.
3 March	Algerine	Pigmy-class schooner	John King	Upnor	United Kingdom	For Royal Navy.
7 March	Cressy	Vengeur-class ship of the line	Josiah Brindley	Frindsbury	United Kingdom	For Royal Navy.
7 March	Egmont	Vengeur-class ship of the line	Thomas Pitcher	Northfleet	United Kingdom	For Royal Navy.
7 March	Hebe	Merchantman	Thomas Steemson	Paull	United Kingdom	For John Staniforth.
7 March	Lolland	Brig	Pihl	Copenhagen	Denmark-Norway	For Dano-Norwegian Navy.
10 March	Hother	Gunship		Bergen	Denmark-Norway	For Dano-Norwegian Navy.
10 March	Nornen	Gunship		Bergen	Denmark-Norway	For Dano-Norwegian Navy.
10 March	Pioneer	Pigmy-class schooner	John King	Upnor	United Kingdom	For Royal Navy.
10 March	Valkyrien	Gunship		Bergen	Denmark-Norway	For Dano-Norwegian Navy.
22 March	Decoy	Decoy-class cutter	Daniel List	Fishbourne	United Kingdom	For Royal Navy.
23 March	Armada	Vengeur-class ship of the line	Isaac Blackburn	Turnchapel	United Kingdom	For Royal Navy.
24 March	Dochfour	West Indiaman	Sydenham Teast	Bristol	United Kingdom	For A. J. Robe.
March	Sarah	West Indiaman	Hillhouse, Sons & Co.	Bristol	United Kingdom	For Philip James Miles.
3 April	Nisus	Lively-class frigate	Joseph Tucker	Plymouth Dockyard	United Kingdom	For Royal Navy.
5 April	William Ashton	West Indiaman	John Brockbank	Lancaster	United Kingdom	For Messrs. Burrow & Nottage.
17 April	Menelaus	Lively-class frigate	Joseph Tucker	Plymouth Dockyard	United Kingdom	For Royal Navy.
21 April	America	Vengeur-class ship of the line	John Perry	Blackwall Yard	United Kingdom	For Royal Navy.
21 April	North Star	Cormorant-class sloop	Benjamin Tanner & John Cock	Dartmouth	United Kingdom	For Royal Navy.
24 April	Dwarf	Decoy-class cutter	James Lawes	Sandgate	United Kingdom	For Royal Navy.
24 April	Racer	Decoy-class cutter	William Baker	Sandgate	United Kingdom	For Royal Navy.
28 April	Axel Thorsen	Gunship			Denmark-Norway	For Dano-Norwegian Navy.
2 May	Friedland	Bucentaure-class ship of the line	Pierre Jacques Guillaume Lair	Antwerp	France	For French Navy.
4 May	Friponne	Corvette			France	For French Navy.
12 May	Renard	Abeille-class brig	Genoa Dockyard	Genoa	France	For French Navy.
19 May	L'Epervier	Sylphe-class brig			France	For private owner.
20 May	Iphigénie	Pallas-class frigate	Jean Michel Segondat	Cherbourg	France	For French Navy.
21 May	Astraea	Apollo-class frigate	Robert Guillaume	Northam	United Kingdom	For Royal Navy.
21 May	Nestor	Téméraire-class ship of the line	Pierre Degay & others	Brest	France	For french Navy.
28 May	Skiøn Valborg	Gunship		Trondheim	Denmark-Norway	For Dano-Norwegian Navy.
May	Hannibal	Fame-class ship of the line	Henry Adams	Bucklers Hard	United Kingdom	For Royal Navy.
2 June	Banterer	Crocus-class brig-sloop	Edward Sison	Woolwich Dockyard	United Kingdom	For Royal Navy.
2 June	Macedonian	Lively-class frigate	Edward Sison	Woolwich Dockyard	United Kingdom	For Royal Navy.
4 June	George III	Convict ship	John Dudman & Co.	Deptford	United Kingdom	For Sir S. Clark.
6 June	Guildford	Merchantman	Wells, Wigram & Green	Blackwall	United Kingdom	For James Mangles.
19 June	Minden	Ganges-class ship of the line	Jamsetjee Bomanjee Wadia	Calcutta	India	For Royal Navy.
19 June	Vengeur	Vengeur-class ship of the line	Joseph Graham	Harwich	United Kingdom	For Royal Navy.
23 June	Medway	Merchantman	John King	Frindsbury	United Kingdom	For Taylor & Co.
26 June	Royal Dutchman	Three-decker		Antwerp	France	For French Navy.
27 June	Globe	Merchantman	G. W. Porrett	Scarborough	United Kingdom	For private owner.
June	Dromadaire	Corvette		Marseille	France	For French Navy.
1 July	Méduse	Pallas-class frigate	Mathurin Crucy	Paimbœuf	France	For French Navy.
1 July	Wagram	Océan-class ship of the line	François-Frédéric Poncet	Toulon	France	For French Navy.
3 July	Boyne	Boyne-class ship of the line	Nicholas Diddams	Portsmouth Dockyard	United Kingdom	For Royal Navy.
3 July	Cornwall	Merchantman	Matthew Smith	Howrah	India	For George Palmer.
3 July	Favorite	Diligente-class corvette			France	For French Navy.
17 July	Queen Charlotte	First rate	Robert John Nelson	Deptford Dockyard	United Kingdom	For Royal Navy.
19 July	Unnamed	Merchantman	Menzies	Leith	United Kingdom	For private owner.
1 August	Conquestador	Vengeur-class ship of the line	Robert Guillaume	Northam	United Kingdom	For Royal Navy.
1 August	Impregnable	Second rate	Robert Seppings	Chatham Dockyard	United Kingdom	For Royal Navy.
5 August	Aziia	Third rate	M. K. Surovtsov	Kherson	Russia	For Imperial Russian Navy.
7 August	Somersetshire	West Indiaman	Daniel & Samuel Brent	Rotherhithe	United Kingdom	For Gordon & Co.
15 August	Sceptre	Bucentaure-class ship of the line	François-Frédéric Poncet	Toulon	France	For French Navy.
15 August	Tilsitt	Bucentaure-class ship of the line	Pierre Jacques Guillaume Lair	Antwerp	France	For French Navy.
18 August	Alcyone	Merchantman	Thomas Steemson	Paull	United Kingdom	For Read & Co.
21 August	Capri	Téméraire-class ship of the line		Castellamare di Stabia	Kingdom of Naples	For Royal Neapolitan Navy.
25 August	Oswin	Merchantman	Temple	South Shields	United Kingdom	For Mr. Atkinson.
28 August	Egfrid	Merchantman	Temple	South Shields	United Kingdom	For Brown & Co.
30 August	Portia	Crocus-class brig-sloop	Robert Nelson	Deptford Dockyard	United Kingdom	For Royal Navy.
31 August	Galatea	Apollo-class frigate	Robert John Nelson	Deptford Dockyard	United Kingdom	For Royal Navy.
1 September	Caesar	West Indiaman	Wells, Wigram & Green	Blackwall	United Kingdom	For H. Turner.
6 September	Rivoli	Téméraire-class ship of the line	Jean Marguerite Tupinier	Venice	Kingdom of Italy	For French Navy.
13 September	Martha	Merchantman	Blackett & Co.	Quebec	(United Kingdom of Great Britain and Ireland) Upper Canada	For private owner.
15 September	Grenada	Convict ship	Thomas Steemson	Paull	United Kingdom	For J. Blackett.
30 September	Pamiat Evstafii	Pamiat Evstafii-class ship of the line	G. S. Isakov	Saint Petersburg	Russia	For Imperial Russian Navy.
10 October	Harriett Shakespeare	Merchantman	John Macrae	Chittagong	India	For private owner.
12 October	Marengo	Téméraire-class ship of the line		Lorient	France	For French Navy.
12 October	Trekh Sviatitelei	Trekh Sviatitelei-class ship of the line	I. V. Kurepanov	Saint Petersburg	Russia	For Imperial Russian Navy.
13 October	Coldstream	Merchantman	John Dudman	Deptford	United Kingdom	For private owner.
13 October	Hotspur	Fifth rate	George Parsons	Warsash	United Kingdom	For Royal Navy.
28 October	Saale	Armide-class frigate	Antoine Bonnet de Lescure	Rochefort	France	For French Navy.
30 October	Prégel	Pallas-class frigate	Jean Jacques Denaix	Saint-Malo	France	For French Navy.
October	Lady Rollo	Merchantman		Calcutta	India	For private owner.
6 November	Dmitrii Donskoi	Anapa-class ship of the line	M. K. Surovtsov	Kherson	Russia	For Imperial Russian Navy.
12 November	Phoenix	Merchantman	Robert Davy	Topsham	United Kingdom	For John Blankett.
16 November	Oracabessa	West Indiaman	Thomas Walton	Hull	United Kingdom	For Mr. Moxon.
23 November	Lord Wellington	West Indiaman	John King	Frindsbury	United Kingdom	For Messrs. Clay.
11 December	Crescent	Lively-class frigate	Edward Sison	Woolwich Dockyard	United Kingdom	For Royal Navy.
5 December	Phoenix	Man-of-war		Copenhagen	Denmark-Norway	For Dano-Norwegian Navy.
15 December	Ulysses	Ship of the line			Denmark-Norway	For Dano-Norwegian Navy.
20 December	Avenger of the Seas	Full-rigged ship		Rotterdam	(France) French First Empire	For Dutch Navy.
December	Charles Mills	Full-rigged ship	Carson, Forbes, Courtenay & Co.	Chester	United Kingdom	For Messrs. Christopher, Jackson & Wheeler.
Unknown date	Adriatic	Merchantman	Booth & Co.	Sunderland	United Kingdom	For Moon & Co.
Unknown date	Alexander	Privateer		Salem, Massachusetts	United States	For private owner.
Unknown date	Ann Elizabeth	Merchantman	John & Philip Laing	Sunderland	United Kingdom	For W. Alexander.
Unknown date	Atlantic	Merchantman	R. Radcliffe	Monkwearmouth	United Kingdom	For private owner.
Unknown date	Baltimore	Merchantman		Maryland	United States	For Peter Arnold Karthaus.
Unknown date	Barton	West Indiaman		Liverpool	United Kingdom	For Barton & Co.
Unknown date	Belinda	Brig		Great Yarmouth	United Kingdom	For private owner.
Unknown date	Cambridge	East Indiaman	Thomas Pitcher	Northfleet	United Kingdom	For British East India Company.
Unknown date	Chippewa	Schooner	Anderson Martin	Chippewa	(United Kingdom of Great Britain and Ireland) Upper Canada	For private owner.
Unknown date	Comet	Schooner	Thomas Kemp	Baltimore, Maryland	United States	For William Furlong & Thorndike Chase.
Unknown date	Curlew	Brig	Josiah Barker	Charlestown, Massachusetts	United States	For George Baylies.
Unknown date	Dart	Cutter		Mevagissey	United Kingdom	Purchased on the stocks by the Royal Navy.
Unknown date	Earl Balcarras	Full-rigged ship		Bombay	India	For British East India Company.
Unknown date	Edward	Full-rigged ship	Howard Benj	Sunderland	United Kingdom	For private owner.
Unknown date	Essex	Merchantman	John Brockbank	Lancaster	United Kingdom	For private owner.
Unknown date	Esther	Merchantman	John Brockbank	Lancaster	United Kingdom	For private owner.
Unknown date	Fairlie	Merchantman	J. Gilmore	Calcutta	India	For Fairlie, Fergusson & Co.
Unknown date	Favorita	Pallas-class frigate		Venice	Kingdom of Italy	For Royal Italian Navy.
Unknown date	Friendship	Brig		Hylton	United Kingdom	For private owner.
Unknown date	Gardiner and Joseph	Whaler		Hull	United Kingdom	For Mr. Eggingtons.
Unknown date	Hannibal	Sloop	William Price	Baltimore, Maryland	United States	For private owner.
Unknown date	Harriet	Merchantman		New York	United States	For private owner.
Unknown date	Hibernia	Brig		Cowes	United Kingdom	For J. Lennen.
Unknown date	Hyperion	Merchantman		Whitby	United Kingdom	For private owner.
Unknown date	Indian	Merchantman	Simon Temple	South Shields	United Kingdom	For private owner.
Unknown date	Jane	Merchantman		Sunderland	United Kingdom	For private owner.
Unknown date	Janus	Full-rigged ship		New York	United States	For private owner.
Unknown date	John Hamilton	Merchantman	Fishburn & Broderick	Hull	United Kingdom	For private owner.
Unknown date	John Palmer	Merchantman	Michael Smith	Calcutta	India	For private owner.
Unknown date	Lady Banks	Merchantman		Boston	United Kingdom	For Mr. Meadburn.
Unknown date	Lady Prevost	Schooner		Amherstburg Royal Naval Dockyard	(United Kingdom of Great Britain and Ireland) Upper Canada	For Provincial Marine.
Unknown date	L'Auguste	Privateer	Mathurin Guillaume Guibert de La Noe	Saint-Servan	France	For Robert Surcouf.
Unknown date	Lord Melville	Merchantman		Blyth	United Kingdom	For Holland & Co.
Unknown date	Lord Wellington	Whaler		Hull	United Kingdom	For W. Bolton.
Unknown date	Luna	Merchantman	John & Philip Laing	Sunderland	United Kingdom	For private owner.
Unknown date	Mediterranean	Merchantman			United Kingdom	For H. Martin & Co.
Unknown date	Monarch	Coaster	Holt & Richardson	Whitby	United Kingdom	For Holt & Richardson.
Unknown date	Neptune	Merchantman	Roberts & Co.	Whitby	United Kingdom	For private owner.
Unknown date	Ohio	Schooner	Murray & Bigsbey	Cleveland, Ohio	United Kingdom	For private owner.
Unknown date	Orbit	Merchantman			United States	For private owner.
Unknown date	Phønix	Fourth rate			Denmark-Norway	For Dano-Norwegian Navy.
Unknown date	Pioneer	Privateer	Talbot & Co.		United States	For private owner.
Unknown date	Psyche	Brig		Bombay	India	For British East India Company.
Unknown date	Queen Charlotte	Ship-sloop	William Bell	Amherstburg Royal Naval Dockyard	(United Kingdom of Great Britain and Ireland) Upper Canada	For Provincial Marine.
Unknown date	Rachel	Brig			United Kingdom	For private owner.
Unknown date	Rembang	Full-rigged ship			(Netherlands) Kingdom of Holland	For Royal Dutch Navy.
Unknown date	Sappho	West Indiaman		Sunderland	United Kingdom	For Francis Baring.
Unknown date	Sophia	Full-rigged ship	John & Philip Laing	Sunderland	United Kingdom	For George & Philip Protheroe.
Unknown date	St. Andrews	Full-rigged ship	R. Whinnen	Sunderland	United Kingdom	For Mr. Davison.
Unknown date	Success	Merchantman	Samuel Cooke	Deptford	United Kingdom	For private owner.
Unknown date	Thetis	Brig		Bombay	India	For British East India Company.
Unknown date	Wasp	Schooner		Baltimore, Maryland	United States	For private owner.
Unknown date	Whale	Sloop		Scotland Island	(United Kingdom of Great Britain and Ireland) New South Wales	For private owner.
Unknown date	Name unknown	Merchantman			France	For private owner.
Unknown date	Name unknown	Merchantman		Nantes	France	For private owner.
Unknown date	Name unknown	Merchantman		Wiscasset, Maine	United States	For private owner.
Unknown date	Name unknown	Merchantman		Dunkerque	France	For private owner.
Unknown date	Name unknown	Merchantman			France	For private owner.
