= List of shipwrecks in May 1823 =

The list of shipwrecks in May 1823 includes all ships sunk, foundered, grounded, or otherwise lost during May 1823.

== 2 May ==
List of shipwrecks: 2 May 1823
Ship	State	Description
Mariner	United Kingdom	The ship departed from the Bay of Islands, New Zealand for Rio de Janeiro, Brazil. No further trace, presumed foundered with the loss of all hands.

== 3 May ==
List of shipwrecks: 3 May 1823
Ship	State	Description
Mary Ann	United Kingdom	The ship was sunk by ice in the Atlantic Ocean. Her crew took to the boats and were rescued the next day by Princess of Wales (United Kingdom).

== 4 May ==
List of shipwrecks: 4 May 1823
Ship	State	Description
Betsey	United Kingdom	The ship struck rocks and sank at Peterhead, Aberdeenshire.
Gaspard	France	The ship caught fire at Nantes, Loire-Inférieure and was scuttled.
Robert & Georgiana	Norway	The ship was wrecked on the Sunk Sand, in the North Sea. Her crew were rescued. She was on a voyage from Norway to L'Orient, Morbihan, France.

== 5 May ==
List of shipwrecks: 5 May 1823
Ship	State	Description
Halifax	United Kingdom	The ship capsized in the River Thames near London Bridge. She was on a voyage from London to Leeds, Yorkshire.

== 6 May ==
List of shipwrecks: 6 May 1823
Ship	State	Description
Mountstone (or Mount Stone)	United Kingdom	The brig struck an iceberg and foundered in the Atlantic Ocean (46°10′N 45°30′W). All eight people on board survived, but six of them died in the ten days before the survivors were rescued. She was on a voyage from Plymouth, Devon, to St. John's, Newfoundland, British North America.
Peace	United Kingdom	The ship struck the Runnel Stone and was beached in Whitsand Bay. She was on a voyage from Salcombe, Devon, to Liverpool, Lancashire. Peace was refloated on 8 May and taken in to Penzance, Cornwall.

== 7 May ==
List of shipwrecks: 7 May 1823
Ship	State	Description

== 8 May ==
List of shipwrecks: 8 May 1823
Ship	State	Description
Societé	France	The ship was wrecked near Vlissingen, Zeeland, Netherlands. Her crew were rescued. She was on a voyage from Havre de Grâce, Seine-Inférieure to Dunkerque, Nord.

== 9 May ==
List of shipwrecks: 9 May 1823
Ship	State	Description
Friends	United Kingdom	The sloop foundered with the loss of all hands. She was on a voyage from Jersey, Channel Islands, to Faversham, Kent.
Helena	Bremen	The ship was run aground 3 nautical miles (5.6 km) south of "Fowis Island" and was abandoned by her crew. She was subsequently taken in to "Pile Foundry", Lancashire, United Kingdom. Helena was on a voyage from Málaga, Spain, to Bremen.

== 10 May ==
List of shipwrecks: 10 May 1823
Ship	State	Description
Bardsea	United Kingdom	The ship departed from Maryport, Cumberland. No further trace, presumed foundered with the loss of all hands.
Maria Louise	France	The ship was wrecked at "Bretegnole". She was on a voyage from Bordeaux, Gironde, to Nantes, Loire-Inférieure.
Supply	United Kingdom	The schooner was wrecked at St. Bees Head, Cumberland, with the loss of twelve lives. She was on a voyage from Whitehaven, Cumberland, to Liverpool, Lancashire.

== 11 May ==
List of shipwrecks: 11 May 1823
Ship	State	Description
Comète	France	The ship was wrecked at Dunkerque, Nord. Her crew were rescued. She was on a voyage from Marennes, Charente-Maritime to Dunkerque.
Friends	United Kingdom	The ship was driven ashore and damaged at Whitehaven, Cumberland. She was on a voyage from Sierra Leone to Whitehaven.
Hortense	France	The ship capsized at Havre de Grâce. She was on a voyage from Saint Domingo to Havre de Grâce.
Supply	United Kingdom	The ship was driven ashore and wrecked between Drigg and Ravenglass, Cumberland, with the loss of twelve lives. She was on a voyage from Whitehaven, Cumberland, to Liverpool, Lancashire.

== 13 May ==
List of shipwrecks: 13 May 1823
Ship	State	Description
Constantia	United Kingdom	The barque was wrecked in Gabaron Bay, Cape Breton Island, Nova Scotia, British North America. The crew and all six passengers were rescued. She was on a voyage from Bristol, Gloucestershire, to Quebec City, Lower Canada, British North America.
General Phipps	United States	The ship was driven ashore in Bootle Bay. She was on a voyage from New Orleans, Louisiana, to Liverpool, Lancashire, United Kingdom. General Phipps was refloated on 15 May and taken in to Liverpool.

== 14 May ==
List of shipwrecks: 14 May 1823
Ship	State	Description
Lord Wellington	United Kingdom	The ship struck an iceberg in the Atlantic Ocean and was abandoned by her crew. She was on a voyage from Liverpool, Lancashire, to Miramichi, New Brunswick, British North America.

== 16 May ==
List of shipwrecks: 16 May 1823
Ship	State	Description
Appledram	United Kingdom	The sloop ran aground east of Worms Head, Glamorgan. She was refloated on 6 June.
Robert	United Kingdom	The brig was wrecked at Longness Point, Isle of Man, with the loss of about 40 lives, with no more than 19 survivors. She was on a voyage from Dublin to Liverpool, Lancashire.
Termagent	United Kingdom	The ship was driven ashore at Maryland, Cumberland.

== 17 May ==
List of shipwrecks: 17 May 1823
Ship	State	Description
Hannah	United Kingdom	The ship was driven ashore near Helsingør, Denmark. She was on a voyage from Whitby, Yorkshire, to Bandholm, Denmark. She had been refloated by 23 May and resumed her voyage.
Helen & Jessie	United Kingdom	The ship struck the Bondicar Rocks, Northumberland, and sank. She was on a voyage from Newcastle upon Tyne, Northumberland, to Alloa, Clackmannanshire.

== 18 May ==
List of shipwrecks: 18 May 1823
Ship	State	Description
Joseph	United Kingdom	The brig capsized in the River Severn at Arlingham, Gloucestershire. Her crew survived.

== 20 May ==
List of shipwrecks: 20 May 1823
Ship	State	Description
August Wilhelm	Stettin	The ship was wrecked at Thisted, Denmark. She was on a voyage from Stettin to Bristol, Gloucestershire, United Kingdom.
Vesta	United Kingdom	The ship struck an iceberg and sank in the Atlantic Ocean 100 nautical miles (190 km) east of Cape St. Francis, Newfoundland, British North America. Her crew were rescued by Elizabeth ( (United Kingdom of Great Britain and Ireland) British North America). Vesta was on a voyage from Waterford to Carbonear, Newfoundland.

== 22 May ==
List of shipwrecks: 22 May 1823
Ship	State	Description
Success	United States	The ship was wrecked in the Caicos Islands. Her crew were rescued. She was on a voyage from Norfolk, Virginia, to Jamaica.

== 26 May ==
List of shipwrecks: 26 May 1823
Ship	State	Description
Collector	United States	The schooner was wrecked off St. George's, Grenada. Her crew survived. She was on a voyage from Philadelphia, Pennsylvania, to St. Thomas, Virgin Islands.

== 27 May ==
List of shipwrecks: 27 May 1823
Ship	State	Description
Cuttack	United Kingdom	The brig was lost in the Bay of Bengal.
Helen	United Kingdom	The brig was wrecked on Long Island, in the Bay of Bengal with the loss of all hands.
Liverpool	United Kingdom	The ship was wrecked in the Bay of Bengal with the loss of all but four of her crew.
Orracabezza	United Kingdom	The ship was wrecked in the Bay of Bengal. At least 36 of her crew survived.
Torch Lightship	India	The lightship was lost in the Bay of Bengal.

== 30 May ==
List of shipwrecks: 30 May 1823
Ship	State	Description
Nathaniel	United Kingdom	The collier was driven ashore at Brighton, Sussex. She was refloated on 5 June.
Orbit	United Kingdom	The ship was wrecked on the Leadburg Reef. Her crew were rescued. She was on a voyage from New Orleans, Louisiana, to Liverpool, Lancashire.

== Unknown date ==
List of shipwrecks: Unknown date in May 1823
Ship	State	Description
Cossack	(United Kingdom of Great Britain and Ireland) New South Wales	The ship was wrecked at the mouth of the Gambier River, New Zealand. Her crew survived
Estrella	Spain	The brig was wrecked on the Great Isaac Key. Her crew were rescued. She was on a voyage from Puerto Rico to Havana, Cuba.
Eugenie	France	The ship foundered in the Bay of Biscay before 12 May. Her crew were rescued. She was on a voyage from Bordeaux, Gironde, to Nantes, Loire-Inférieure.
Frederick	France	The ship was foundered whilst on a voyage from Marseille, Bouches-du-Rhône to Rouen, Seine-Inférieure. Her crew were rescued by a Norwegian vessel.
Hazard	United States	The ship foundered in the Atlantic Ocean. Her crew were rescued by Squirrel (United Kingdom). Hazard was on a voyage from Puerto Rico to Boston, Massachusetts.
Jane	United States	The schooner was wrecked in the Abaco Islands.
Jeune Emilie	France	The ship was wrecked on the French coast. She was on a voyage from Rouen to Southampton, Hampshire, United Kingdom.
Joseph	United Kingdom	The ship was driven ashore in the River Severn. She was on a voyage from Newhaven, Sussex, to Pembroke.
Leopard	United States	The sloop was wrecked on the Florida Keys. Her crew were rescued. She was on a voyage from St Augustines, Florida Territory to Havana.
Le Zéphyr	France	The brig was wrecked on the coast of Catalonia, Spain. Her crew were taken prisoner.
Sans Souci	France	The ship ran aground on the Goodwin Sands, Kent, United Kingdom. She was refloated and subsequently came shore near Ramsgate, Kent. Sans Souci was on a voyage from Bordeaux, Gironde, to Saint-Valery-sur-Somme. She was later refloated and taken in to Ramsgate in a damaged condition.
