= List of shipwrecks in June 1848 =

The list of shipwrecks in June 1848 includes ships sunk, foundered, wrecked, grounded, or otherwise lost during June 1848.

== 1 June ==
List of shipwrecks: 1 June 1848
Ship	State	Description
Argo	(United Kingdom of Great Britain and Ireland) British North America	The ship was driven ashore near Renews, Newfoundland. Her crew were rescued. She was on a voyage from Saint John's, Newfoundland to Saint John, New Brunswick.
Bessy Dryden	United Kingdom	The ship was wrecked on Cape Sable Island, Nova Scotia, British North America. Her crew were rescued. She was on a voyage from Portsmouth, Hampshire to Saint John, New Brunswick.
Families Vels	Norway	The ship was driven ashore in the Isles of Scilly, United Kingdom. She was on a voyage from Christiania to Málaga, Spain. She was refloated and taken in to St. Mary's, Isles of Scilly in a severely damaged condition.
Jane	(United Kingdom of Great Britain and Ireland) British North America	The ship was driven ashore and wrecked at Cape Race, Newfoundland. She was on a voyage from Harbour Grace, Newfoundland to Richibucto, New Brunswick.
Jane and Margaret	United Kingdom	The brig sprang a leak and was assisted in to Sheerness, Kent.
Shylock	United States	The ship schooner was abandoned off Popes Harbour, Nova Scotia, British North America. She was on a voyage from New York to Arichat, Nova Scotia. She was taken in to "Mary Joseph Harbour" the next day in a derelict condition.
Sofia	(Russian Empire) Grand Duchy of Finland	The ship was driven ashore on Gotland, Sweden. She was on a voyage from Cádiz, Spain to Oulu. She was refloated and beached at Fröjel, Sweden, where she was wrecked. Her crew were rescued.
Sophia	(United Kingdom of Great Britain and Ireland) New South Wales	The schooner was wrecked on a reef off Point Nepean. All on board survived. She was on a voyage from Hobart, Van Diemen's Land to Port Phillip, South Australia.

== 2 June ==
List of shipwrecks: 2 June 1848
Ship	State	Description
Aigle	United Kingdom	The ship was driven ashore near Ostend, West Flanders, Belgium. She was on a voyage from Liverpool, Lancashire to Ostend She was refloated on 10 June and taken in to Ostend.
Ariel	United Kingdom	The P&O paddle steamer ran aground on the Mal di Ventro Shoal, in the Ligurian Sea off Livorno, Grand Duchy of Tuscany. She became a wreck on 1 July. She was refloated with assistance from HMS Sidon (Royal Navy) and taken in to Livorno in a severely damaged condition.
Happy Return	United Kingdom	The ship was driven ashore at Bideford, Devon. She was on a voyage from Barnstaple, Devon to Newport, Monmouthshire.
London Packet	United Kingdom	The ship ran aground on the Inner Barber Sand. She was on a voyage from Hartlepool, County Durham to Whitstable, Kent. she was refloated and put in to Ramsgate, Kent in a leaky condition.
Mary Elizabeth	(United Kingdom of Great Britain and Ireland) British North America	The schooner was in collision with another vessel and was abandoned in the Atlantic Ocean. She was towed in to Salem, Massachusetts, United States in a derelict condition on 4 June.
Transit	United Kingdom	The ship ran aground on the Brake Sand, in the North Sea off the coast of Kent. She was on a voyage from Hartlepool to Torquay, Devon. She was refloated and put in to Ramsgate.

== 3 June ==
List of shipwrecks: 3 June 1848
Ship	State	Description
Aigle	Belgium	The ship struck the pier at Ostend, West Flanders and sank. Her crew were rescued. She was on a voyage from Liverpool, Lancashire, United Kingdom to Ostend.
Mary Elliot	United Kingdom	The schooner was driven ashore and wrecked 4 nautical miles (7.4 km) from Burry Port, Glamorgan. Her crew were rescued. She was on a voyage from Burry Port to Holyhead, Anglesey.

== 4 June ==
List of shipwrecks: 4 June 1848
Ship	State	Description
Greenock	United Kingdom	The brig was wrecked on the south coast of Saint Domingo. Her crew were rescued.

== 5 June ==
List of shipwrecks: 5 June 1848
Ship	State	Description
Benjamin and Alexander	United Kingdom	The cutter sprang a leak off Pladda and was abandoned. Her crew were rescued by HMRC Swift ( Board of Customs) before she foundered in the Firth of Forth. Benjamin and Alexander was on a voyage from Larne, County Antrim to Glasgow, Renfrewshire.
Deux Frères	United Kingdom	The ship ran aground on the Long Sand, in the North Sea off the coast of Essex, United Kingdom. She was on a voyage from Caen, Calvados to London, United Kingdom. She was refloated and assisted in to Wivenhoe, Essex.
Samuel and William	United Kingdom	The ship ran aground on the Whitby Rock. She was on a voyage from Blyth, Northumberland to King's Lynn, Norfolk. She was refloated and resumed her voyage.

== 7 June ==
List of shipwrecks: 7 June 1848
Ship	State	Description
HDMS Havfruen	Royal Danish Navy	First Schleswig War: The frigate ran aground on a reef off the Haide Ort whilst blockading Hamburg. She was refloated with the assistance of a steamship.

== 8 June ==
List of shipwrecks: 8 June 1848
Ship	State	Description
Aurora	United Kingdom	The ship ran aground off Smyrna, Ottoman Empire. She was on a voyage from Smyrna to Cork.
Cogniac	France	The ship ran aground on the Scroby Sands, Norfolk, United Kingdom. She was refloated.
Eliza Bowen	United Kingdom	The ship ran aground off Smyrna. She was on a voyage from Smyrna to Liverpool, Lancashire. She was refloated.
Gordon	United Kingdom	The schooner sprang a leak and foundered in the North Sea 100 nautical miles (190 km) off the Firth of Forth. Her crew were rescued by the schooner Harwood (United Kingdom). Gordon was on a voyage from Grangemouth, Stirlingshire to Hamburg.

== 9 June ==
List of shipwrecks: 9 June 1848
Ship	State	Description
Pilot	(United Kingdom of Great Britain and Ireland) Cape Colony	The brig was wrecked on a reef off Île Plate, Mauritius. Her crew were rescued. She was on a voyage from Colombo, Ceylon to the Seychelles and Mauritius.

== 10 June ==
List of shipwrecks: 10 June 1848
Ship	State	Description
Albion	(United Kingdom of Great Britain and Ireland) Swan River Colony	The ship was driven ashore in Koombana Bay. She was refloated on 26 June.
Highlander	United Kingdom	The ship ran aground at Inverkeithing, Fife. She was on a voyage from Inverkeithing to Kronstadt, Russia.
Lee	United Kingdom	The schooner was wrecked on Glover's Reef, 60 nautical miles (110 km) north of Belize City, British Honduras. All on board were rescued. She was on a voyage from Havana, Cuba to Belize City.
Shield	United Kingdom	The ship was driven ashore at Helsingør, Denmark. She was on a voyage from Memel, Prussia to London. She was refloated and resumed her voyage.
Triton	United Kingdom	The ship ran aground on the Shipwash Sand, in the North Sea off the coast of Essex. She was on a voyage from Sunderland, County Durham to Cowes, Isle of Wight. She was refloated and put in to Great Yarmouth, Norfolk in a leaky condition.
Victory	France	The ship ran aground and was damaged on the Brigantine Shoal. She was on a voyage from Havre de Grâce, Seine-Inférieure to New York, United States. She was refloated the next day.

== 11 June ==
List of shipwrecks: 11 June 1848
Ship	State	Description
Ailsa	United Kingdom	The ship was wrecked on "Whitehead Island". Her crew were rescued. She was on a voyage from Saint John, New Brunswick, British North America to Richibucto, New Brunswick.
David Grant	United Kingdom	The ship ran aground off Seal Island, Nova Scotia, British North America. She was on a voyage from Boston to Quebec City, Province of Canada, British North America.
William	United Kingdom	The ship was driven ashore at Helsingør, Denmark. She was on a voyage from Vyborg, Grand Duchy of Finland to London. She was refloated on 17 June and resumed her voyage.

== 12 June ==
List of shipwrecks: 12 June 1848
Ship	State	Description
Catherine	United Kingdom	The sloop was driven ashore 2 nautical miles (3.7 km) south of the mouth of the River Dovey.
Kleinkinderen	Netherlands	The fishing vessel was driven ashore and wrecked at Grutness, Shetland Islands, United Kingdom.
Lively	United Kingdom	The sloop was driven ashore 2 nautical miles (3.7 km) south of the mouth of the River Dovey.
Martha	United Kingdom	The ship was lost near "Holland Harbour". Her crew were rescued. She was on a voyage from Cork to New York, United States and Miramichi, New Brunswick, British North America.

== 13 June ==
List of shipwrecks: 13 June 1848
Ship	State	Description
Ann	United Kingdom	The ship was driven ashore at Ilfracombe, Devon. She was on a voyage from Bristol, Gloucestershire to Dartmouth, Devon. She was refloated.
John St. Barbe	United Kingdom	The ship sank on the North Bank, in Liverpool Bay. Her crew were rescued. She was on a voyage from Porthcawl, Glamorgan to Liverpool, Lancashire.
Lancaster Rose	United Kingdom	The ship was driven ashore and severely damaged at Rossall, Lancashire. Her crew were rescued.
Larne	United Kingdom	The ship was driven ashore in the Victoria Channel. She was on a voyage from Liverpool to New Orleans, Louisiana. She was refloated the next day and beached at Liverpool.

== 14 June ==
List of shipwrecks: June 1848
Ship	State	Description
Alice	United Kingdom	The sloop was wrecked on the Horse Bank, in Liverpool Bay. Her crew were rescued by the Southport Lifeboat.
Fanny and Jane	United Kingdom	The ship sank in Oxwick Bay. Her crew were rescued. She was on a voyage from Newport, Monmouthshire to Liverpool, Lancashire. She was refloated on 22 June and beached.
Liberty	United Kingdom	The sloop sank in the North Sea off Berwick upon Tweed, Northumberland. Her crew were rescued by the sloop William (United Kingdom). She was on a voyage from Sunderland, County Durham, to Leith, Lothian.
Philemon	United Kingdom	The schooner was driven ashore and wrecked at Maidencombe, Devon.

== 15 June ==
List of shipwrecks: 15 June 1848
Ship	State	Description
Ellen Jenkinson	United Kingdom	The ship ran aground at Egremont, Lancashire. She was on a voyage from Liverpool, Lancashire to Africa. She was refloated the next day and taken in to Liverpool.
Gannet	United Kingdom	The ship ran aground south east of Kronstadt, Russia. She was on a voyage from Wick, Caithness to Kronstadt. She was later refloated and taken in to Kronstadt.

== 16 June ==
List of shipwrecks: 16 June 1848
Ship	State	Description
William and Henry Brown	United Kingdom	The brig sprang a leak and was beached at South Shields, County Durham.

== 17 June ==
List of shipwrecks: 17 June 1848
Ship	State	Description
John Heyes	United Kingdom	The ship was driven ashore in the Sea of Marmora at "Erseke", Ottoman Empire. She had been refloated by 26 June.
Sedgefield	United Kingdom	The ship ran aground and sank off Saaremaa, Russia.

== 18 June ==
List of shipwrecks: 18 June 1848
Ship	State	Description
Fire King	United Kingdom	The steamship struck the pier and sank at Temple Bar, London. All on board were rescued. She was on a voyage from Gravesend, Kent to London.
Lady Huntley	United Kingdom	The barque was abandoned in the Atlantic Ocean. She was on a voyage from Falmouth, Cornwall to Charleston, South Carolina, United States.
Martha	United Kingdom	The ship ran aground on the Woolsteners, in the English Channel. She was on a voyage from Sunderland, County Durham to Bedhampton, Hampshire. She was refloated and taken in to Langstone, Hampshire.

== 19 June ==
List of shipwrecks: 19 June 1848
Ship	State	Description
Ann Louise	United Kingdom	The ship ran aground off Kastrup, Russia. She was on a voyage from Málaga, Spain to Saint Petersburg, Russia.
Defiance	United Kingdom	The ship was set afire by some of her crew, who then abandoned her in West Bay. The remainder of her crew were rescued by the steamship Maria Burt (United States). Defiance was on a voyage from New Orleans, Louisiana, United States to Liverpool, Lancashire.

== 20 June ==
List of shipwrecks: 20 June 1848
Ship	State	Description
Hibernia	United Kingdom	The paddle steamer ran aground off the Calf of Man, Isle of Man. She was on a voyage from New York to Liverpool, Lancashire. She was refloated.
Windsor	United Kingdom	The ship ran aground off the Calf of Man. She was on a voyage from Belfast, County Antrim to Liverpool. She was refloated and resumed her voyage.

== 21 June ==
List of shipwrecks: 21 June 1848
Ship	State	Description
John and William	United Kingdom	The smack foundered in the Bristol Channel off the coast of Glamorgan. Her crew were rescued. She was on a voyage from Porthcawl to Cardiff .
USS Onkahye	United States Navy	The schooner was wrecked on a reef off Caicos. Her crew survived.

== 22 June ==
List of shipwrecks: 22 June 1848
Ship	State	Description
Abeona	(United Kingdom of Great Britain and Ireland) South Australia	The whaler, a brig, was wrecked at New Harbour, Van Diemen's Land. Her crew were rescued.
Centurion	United Kingdom	The ship was wrecked at St. Shott's, Newfoundland, British North America. Her crew were rescued. She was on a voyage from Quebec City, Province of Canada, British North America to London.
Robert	United Kingdom	The schooner capsized in a squall off Ystad, Sweden with the loss of all but one of her crew.

== 23 June ==
List of shipwrecks: 23 June 1848
Ship	State	Description
Gipsy	United Kingdom	The steamship foundered in the Atlantic Ocean 80 nautical miles (150 km) west of the Isles of Scilly. Her crew were rescued. She was on a voyage from London to Bahia, Brazil.
Home	United Kingdom	The ship ran aground and was damaged at Saint John, New Brunswick, British North America. She was on a voyage from Saint John to Liverpool, Lancashire. She was refloated and taken in to Saint John in a waterlogged condition.
Isabella and Jane	United Kingdom	The ship was wrecked on South Uist, Outer Hebrides. Her crew were rescued. She was on a voyage from Liverpool to Boulmer, Northumberland.
John Craig	United Kingdom	The ship was driven ashore near Shippagan, New Brunswick with the loss of six of her crew. She was on a voyage from Shippagan to London.
Royal Sovereign	United Kingdom	The ship foundered in the Atlantic Ocean 35 nautical miles (65 km) off The Stags Rocks, County Cork. Her seventeen crew were rescued. She was on a voyage from Antwerp, Belgium to "Ronneskea", on the Saint Lawrence River, in British North America.

== 24 June ==
List of shipwrecks: 24 June 1848
Ship	State	Description
Mercury	United Kingdom	The ship ran aground off Hiddensee, Prussia. She was refloated and resumed her voyage.
Mars	United Kingdom	The ship foundered in the Bristol Channel off Hartland Point, Devon. Her crew were rescued. She was on a voyage from Portreath, Cornwall to Port Talbot, Glamorgan.
Pekin	United Kingdom	The ship was driven ashore at Kamouraska, Province of Canada, British North America. All on board were rescued. She was on a voyage from Donegal to Quebec City, Province of Canada. She was refloated on 1 July and taken in to Quebec City.

== 25 June ==
List of shipwrecks: 25 June 1848
Ship	State	Description
Anne	(United Kingdom of Great Britain and Ireland) Royal Yacht Squadron	The yacht was wrecked at The Needles, Isle of Wight.
Caroline	Denmark	The ship ran aground on the Lappe Grund. She was on a voyage from Lisbon, Portugal to Copenhagen. She was refloated and resumed her voyage.
Crusader	United Kingdom	The ship was driven ashore at Figueira da Foz, Portugal. She was on a voyage from Saint John's, Newfoundland to Figueira da Foz. She was refloated.
Martha	United Kingdom	The ship ran aground off Texel, North Holland, Netherlands with the loss of four of her crew. She was on a voyage from Cardiff, Glamorgan to Kronstadt, Russia.

== 26 June ==
List of shipwrecks: June 1848
Ship	State	Description
Andes	United Kingdom	The brig foundered in the North Sea 50 nautical miles (93 km) off Flamborough Head, Yorkshire. Her crew were rescued by Polly (Hamburg). Andes was on a voyage from South Shields, County Durham to Turku, Grand Duchy of Finland.
William Parsons	(United Kingdom of Great Britain and Ireland) New South Wales	The ship sank in the Yarra River.

== 27 June ==
List of shipwrecks: 27 June 1848
Ship	State	Description
Ann	United Kingdom	The ship was lost at the mouth of the Eider. Her crew were rescued. She was on a voyage from Newcastle upon Tyne, Northumberland to Delve, Duchy of Schleswig.
Maria Ramiette	France	The ship was wrecked on the Longsand, in the North Sea off the coast of Essex, United Kingdom. Her crew were rescued. She was on a voyage from Sunderland, County Durham, United Kingdom to Brest, Finistère.
Olina	United Kingdom	The ship ran aground on the Goodwin Sands, Kent. She was on a voyage from Nantes, Loire-Inférieure, France to South Shields, County Durham. She was refloated and resumed her voyage.

== 28 June ==
List of shipwrecks: 28 June 1848
Ship	State	Description
Eduviges	Spain	The brig was wrecked on Great Heneagua. She was on a voyage from Santander, Spain to Havana, Cuba.
Friendship	United Kingdom	The ship was driven ashore at Little Milford, Pembrokeshire. She was on a voyage from Milford Haven to Drogheda, County Louth.
Grace	United Kingdom	The ship ran aground and was wrecked near Covelong, India.
Henderina	Netherlands	The galiot was wrecked on Bornholm, Denmark. Her crew were rescued.

== 29 June ==
List of shipwrecks: 29 June 1848
Ship	State	Description
Dolphin	United Kingdom	The schooner foundered in the Bristol Channel off Clevedon, Somerset. Her crew were rescued. She was on a voyage from Swansea, Glamorgan to Gloucester.
Finn MacCoull	United Kingdom	The paddle steamer was wrecked on the Tuskar Rock. All on board survived. She was on a voyage from London to Youghal, County Cork.
Fortitude	United Kingdom	The ship capsized during a squall at Rio de Janeiro, Brazil and was subsequently damaged by fire.

== 30 June ==
List of shipwrecks: 30 June 1848
Ship	State	Description
Janets and Ann	United Kingdom	The ship sprang a leak. She put in to St. David's, Fife, where she sank.
Vampire	(United Kingdom of Great Britain and Ireland) Gibraltar	The yacht was driven ashore and wrecked in Gibraltar Bay.

== Unknown date ==
List of shipwrecks: Unknown date in June 1848
Ship	State	Description
Albatros	United Kingdom	The ship was driven ashore at Plymouth, Devon. She was on a voyage from Middlesbrough, Yorkshire to Plymouth.
Anna Maria	Denmark	The ship was abandoned off Gotland, Sweden before 26 June. She was towed in to Katthammarsvik Sweden by Emma Everoth (Sweden).
Aurora	(United Kingdom of Great Britain and Ireland) Guernsey	The schooner ran aground on The Brambles, in the Solent. She was on a voyage from Guernsey to Southampton, Hampshire.
Belinda	United Kingdom	The ship ran aground off Dagö, Russia before 6 June. She was on a voyage from Hartlepool, County Durham to Kronstadt, Russia. She was later refloated and taken in to Kronstadt.
Brutus	United Kingdom	The ship was driven ashore near Yapton, Antigua. She was on a voyage from Liverpool, Lancashire to Antigua. She was later refloated, and arrived at her destination on 20 June.
Cornelis	Netherlands	The ship foundered in the North Sea. Her crew were rescued. She was on a voyage from Amsterdam, North Holland to Genoa, Kingdom of Sardinia.
Courrier du Havre	France	The lugger sank at "Pierre Rouge" before 5 April.
E. G. Pierre	United States	The schooner was abandoned in the Atlantic Ocean before 17 June. She was on a voyage from New York to Gibraltar.
Eliza and Ann	United Kingdom	The ship was wrecked off the Manicougan Shoals before 16 June. Her crew were rescued. She was on a voyage from Quebec City to Kilrush, County Clare.
Ottawa	United Kingdom	The ship was driven ashore in the Dardanelles before 9 June. She was refloated and resumed her voyage.
Shaw-in-Shaw	United Kingdom	The ship was abandoned off the Coromandel Coast, India before 25 June. She was on a voyage from Akyab, Burma to Madras, India.
Victoria	United Kingdom	The ship was lost near the mouth of the Rio Grande before 20 June. Her crew were rescued.
William	United Kingdom	The ship ran aground at Sharpness, Gloucestershire. She was on a voyage from London to Gloucester. She was refloated on 23 June and completed her voyage.
