= List of shipwrecks in July 1833 =

The list of shipwrecks in July 1833 includes ships sunk, foundered, grounded, or otherwise lost during July 1833.

== 2 July ==
List of shipwrecks: 2 July 1833
Ship	State	Description
Lorton	United Kingdom	The brig ran aground on Egg Island, Bahamas. She was on a voyage from Saint Domingo to Nassau, Bahamas. Lorton was refloated on 15 July and anchored off Hog Island, Bahamas.

== 3 July ==
List of shipwrecks: 3 July 1833
Ship	State	Description
Reine and Caroline	United Kingdom	The ship was driven ashore and severely damaged at Bathurst, The Gambia. She was refloated with assistance from HMS Griffon (Royal Navy).
Sarah	United Kingdom	The ship was driven ashore and damaged beyond economic repair at Richibucto, New Brunswick, British North America. She was on a voyage from Richibucto to the Clyde.

== 4 July ==
List of shipwrecks: 4 July 1833
Ship	State	Description
Alcibiade	France	The ship was driven ashore near "Aixers". She was on a voyage from Sète, Hérault to Rouen, Seine-Inférieure.
Britannia	United Kingdom	The ship was wrecked on a reef off Amber Island, Mauritius. Her crew were rescued. She was on a voyage from Bordeaux, Gironde to Mauritius.
Courier	(United Kingdom of Great Britain and Ireland) New South Wales	The brig was wrecked on Babel Island, Van Diemen's Land. Her crew were rescued. She was on a voyage from New South Wales to Van Diemen's Land.

== 5 July ==
List of shipwrecks: 5 July 1833
Ship	State	Description
Donna Maria	Portuguese Navy	Battle of Cape St. Vincent: The frigate ran aground and was severely damaged. She was later refloated but was unable to sail.
Dorothy	United Kingdom	The ship sprang a leak in late June. She was abandoned by her 25 crew on 5 July and foundered in the South Atlantic (28°24′S 21°00′W). Her crew were rescued on 24 July by Charles Adams (United States). Dorothy was on a voyage from London to Bombay, India.

== 6 July ==
List of shipwrecks: 6 July 1833
Ship	State	Description
Brilliant	United Kingdom	The ship was driven ashore on the Isle of Man. She was o a voyage from Liverpool, Lancashire to Glasgow, Renfrewshire.
Reform	United Kingdom	The ship was lost on "Dussen Island", Cape of Good Hope. Her crew were rescued.

== 7 July ==
List of shipwrecks: 7 July 1833
Ship	State	Description
Brothers	United Kingdom	The ship was in collision with Diadem (United Kingdom) and sank in the North Sea off Harwich, Essex. Her crew were rescued.
Prosperity	United Kingdom	The ship was wrecked in the Strangford River. Her crew were rescued.
Thomas Scattergood	United Kingdom	The ship capsized at Milford Haven, Pembrokeshire. She was on a voyage from Liverpool, Lancashire to Philadelphia, Pennsylvania, United States.

== 9 July ==
List of shipwrecks: 9 July 1833
Ship	State	Description
Sappho	United Kingdom	Sappho was on her way from Savannah to Saint John, New Brunswick, when she stranded on the Wolves Archipelago at the entrance to the Bay of Fundy). The crew was saved. Sappho and her cargo were to be sold at Saint Andrews, New Brunswick.

== 10 July ==
List of shipwrecks: 10 July 1833
Ship	State	Description
Hebe	United Kingdom	The ship was wrecked on Cape Ray, Newfoundland, British North America. All on board were rescued. She was on a voyage from London to Quebec City, Lower Canada, British North America.
Planter	(United Kingdom of Great Britain and Ireland) British North America	The ship was wrecked on the north coast of Prince Edward Island. She was on a voyage from Miramichi, New Brunswick to Newfoundland.

== 11 July ==
List of shipwrecks: 11 July 1833
Ship	State	Description
Francis and Mary	United Kingdom	The ship was abandoned in the Atlantic Ocean. She was on a voyage from Quebec City, Lower Canada, British North America to Waterford. Francis and Mary came ashore on São Miguel, Azores, Portugal on 30 October.
Julie	flag unknown	The ship ran aground in the Eilbrog Sandbank, in the North Sea, where she was wrecked on 24 July. She was on a voyage from Ostend, West Flanders, Belgium to Havre de Grâce, Seine-Inférieure, France.

== 12 July ==
List of shipwrecks: 12 July 1833
Ship	State	Description
Reindeer	United States	The steamboat was destroyed by fire at Louisville, Kentucky.
Volante	United Kingdom	The steamboat was destroyed by fire at Louisville.

== 13 July ==
List of shipwrecks: 13 July 1833
Ship	State	Description
John Reid	United Kingdom	The ship was wrecked on the west coast of Götaland, Sweden. She was on a voyage from Saint Petersburg, Russia to London.

== 18 July ==
List of shipwrecks: 18 July 1833
Ship	State	Description
Industry	United Kingdom	The ship was driven ashore and wrecked 6 nautical miles (11 km) south of Scarborough, Yorkshire. Her crew were rescued.

== 19 July ==
List of shipwrecks: 19 July 1833
Ship	State	Description
Juno	United Kingdom	The ship was destroyed by fire 160 nautical miles (300 km) off Turks Island whilst on a voyage from Saint Thomas, Virgin Islands to Nassau, Bahamas. Her crew were rescued.

== 20 July ==
List of shipwrecks: 20 July 1833
Ship	State	Description
Brothers	United Kingdom	The ship was wrecked on the Carlsfort Reef. She was on a voyage from Havana, Cuba to Guernsey, Channel Islands.

== 21 July ==
List of shipwrecks: 21 July 1833
Ship	State	Description
Deveron	(United Kingdom of Great Britain and Ireland) New South Wales	The whaler, a barque, was foundered in the "Eastern Islands", off the coast of Australia, near Trial Bay. Her crew survived and most were rescued.
Nerova	Netherlands	The ship was lost on the Banjaard Sandbank, in the North Sea. Her crew were rescued.

== 22 July ==
List of shipwrecks: 22 July 1833
Ship	State	Description
Rosé	France	The ship was wrecked on Eleuthera. She was on a voyage from Bordeaux, Gironde to New Orleans, Louisiana, United States.

== 25 July ==
List of shipwrecks: 25 July 1833
Ship	State	Description
Gilbert Henderson	(United Kingdom of Great Britain and Ireland) British North America	The ship was lost in the Magdalen Islands, Lower Canada. Her crew were rescued.
Shute	United Kingdom	The ship was wrecked on the Hogsty Reef, Bahamas. Her crew were rescued.

== 28 July ==
List of shipwrecks: 28 July 1833
Ship	State	Description
Badger	(United Kingdom of Great Britain and Ireland) New South Wales	The two-masted schooner was seized by convicts at Hobart, Van Diemen's Land. She was subsequently wrecked in northern Australian waters.

== 29 July ==
List of shipwrecks: 29 July 1833
Ship	State	Description
Nelly	United Kingdom	The ship was wrecked in the River Spey.

== 31 July ==
List of shipwrecks: 31 July 1833
Ship	State	Description
Ulster	United Kingdom	The ship was driven ashore and wrecked on "Little Egg Island". She was on a voyage from Liverpool, Lancashire to Philadelphia, Pennsylvania, United States

== Unknown date ==
List of shipwrecks: Unknown date 1833
Ship	State	Description
Charles	France	The whaler was wrecked 30 leagues (90 nautical miles (170 km) south of Cape Mesurado, Liberia. Her crew survived.
Hindu	Netherlands	The ship was wrecked on Mauritius. She was on a voyage from Batavia, Netherlands East Indies to Amsterdam, North Holland.
Horsley	United Kingdom	The ship was wrecked on "Cacumel".
Laburnam	United Kingdom	The ship was wrecked on the coast of Africa before 15 July.
Sarah	United Kingdom	The ship was wrecked at Richibucto, New Brunswick, British North America. She was on a voyage from Richibucto to the Clyde.
