= List of shipwrecks in May 1821 =

The list of shipwrecks in May 1821 includes ships sunk, wrecked or otherwise lost during May 1821.

== 1 May ==
List of shipwrecks: 1 May 1821
Ship	State	Description
Jason	United Kingdom	The ship was wrecked at Charleston, South Carolina, United States.

== 2 May ==
List of shipwrecks: 2 May 1821
Ship	State	Description
Jenny	Netherlands	The ship was wrecked in the Islas Sisargas, Spain with the loss of all but one of her crew. She was on a voyage from Amsterdam, North Holland to Rio de Janeiro, Brazil.
Telemaque	Sweden	The ship was driven ashore near Calais, France.

== 7 May ==
List of shipwrecks: 7 May 1821
Ship	State	Description
General Goldie	United Kingdom	The ship foundered in Liverpool Bay with the loss of all seven people on board. She was on a voyage from Waterford to Liverpool, Lancashire.

== 8 May ==
List of shipwrecks: 8 May 1821
Ship	State	Description
Ann	United Kingdom	The ship was driven ashore at Memel, Prussia. She was on a voyage from Hull, Yorkshire to Memel. Ann was refloated on 12 May and taken in to Memel.

== 9 May ==
List of shipwrecks: 9 May 1821
Ship	State	Description
Ann and Isabella	United Kingdom	The sloop was driven ashore and wrecked at Cowie, Aberdeenshire. Her crew survived. She was on a voyage from Stonehaven, Aberdeenshire to Sunderland, County Durham.

== 10 May ==
List of shipwrecks: 10 May 1821
Ship	State	Description
Tom Hazard	United Kingdom	The ship foundered in the Atlantic Ocean (43°25′N 45°21′W). All on board were rescued by Lucy (United Kingdom). She was on a voyage from Bristol, Gloucestershire to New York, United States.

== 13 May ==
List of shipwrecks: 13 May 1821
Ship	State	Description
Esperance	France	The ship was driven ashore and damaged near Cayenne. She was on a voyage from Cayenne to Bordeaux, Gironde. Esperance was later refloated.
Lynx	United Kingdom	The ship was driven ashore and wrecked in the St. Lawrence River. She was on a voyage from Belfast, County Antrim to Quebec, British North America.
Tweed	United Kingdom	The schooner was driven ashore and wrecked near Livorno, Grand Duchy of Tuscany. Her crew were rescued.

== 16 May ==
List of shipwrecks: 16 May 1821
Ship	State	Description
Enchantress	United Kingdom	The ship was driven ashore near Plymouth, Devon. She was on a voyage from Sunderland, County Durham to Plymouth.

== 17 May ==
List of shipwrecks: 17 May 1821
Ship	State	Description
Frolic	United Kingdom	The sloop foundered in the English Channel off Rame Head, Cornwall with the loss of all three crew and her passengers. She was on a voyage from Plymouth, Devon to Falmouth, Cornwall.

== 18 May ==
List of shipwrecks: 18 May 1821
Ship	State	Description
Amethyst	United Kingdom	The ship was driven ashore on Ameland, Friesland, Netherlands. She was on a voyage from Hamburg to Sunderland, County Durham.

== 20 May ==
List of shipwrecks: 20 May 1821
Ship	State	Description
Lynx	United Kingdom	The ship was driven ashore in the Saint Lawrence River. She was on a voyage from Plymouth, Devon to Quebec City, Lower Canada, British North America. Lynx was later refloated and put into Quebec City.

== 21 May ==
List of shipwrecks: 21 May 1821
Ship	State	Description
Jean	United Kingdom	The ship struck a rock at Scarborough, Yorkshire and was severely damaged. She was on a voyage from Scarborough to Sunderland, County Durham. Jean was later refloated and taken in to Scarborough.
Two Friends	United Kingdom	The ship was destroyed by fire in the Atlantic Ocean off Land's End, Cornwall. Her crew were rescued. She was on a voyage from Bridgwater, Somerset to Falmouth, Cornwall.

== 24 May ==
List of shipwrecks: 24 May 1821
Ship	State	Description
Sea Horse	United Kingdom	The pilot boat foundered in the Isles of Scilly with the loss of all three crew.

== 25 May ==
List of shipwrecks: 25 May 1821
Ship	State	Description
Flying Fish	United Kingdom	The drogher was driven ashore and wrecked on Saint Vincent.

== 26 May ==
List of shipwrecks: 26 May 1821
Ship	State	Description
Helena	Norway	The ship was lost at Baltic Port, Russia. She was on a voyage from Bergen to Danzig.
Maria	United Kingdom	The ship was wrecked on Rügen. Her crew were rescued. She was on a voyage from Swinemünde to Memel, Prussia.
Mary	(United Kingdom of Great Britain and Ireland) New South Wales	The ship was wrecked in Two-fold Bay. All on board survived. She was on a voyage from Port Jackson to Port Dalrymple

== 27 May ==
List of shipwrecks: 27 May 1821
Ship	State	Description
Blue-eyed Maid	United Kingdom	The ship capsized in a squall 9 nautical miles (17 km) off Deadman Point, Cornwall. Her crew were rescued by Charlotte & Esther (United Kingdom). Blue-eyed Maid was on a voyage from Waterford to Portsmouth, Hampshire. HMRC Active ( Board of Customs) took her in to Falmouth, Cornwall on 29 May.

== 28 May ==
List of shipwrecks: 28 May 1821
Ship	State	Description
Union	United Kingdom	The ship was driven ashore and wrecked on Saaremaa. Russia. Her crew were rescued. She was on a voyage from Riga, Russia to London.

== 30 May ==
List of shipwrecks: 30 May 1821
Ship	State	Description
Experiment	United Kingdom	The ship foundered off Campbeltown, Argyllshire. Her crew were rescued.

== 31 May ==
List of shipwrecks: 31 May 1821
Ship	State	Description
Three Friends	United Kingdom	The ship capsized and sank in the Tagus.

== Unknown date ==
List of shipwrecks: Unknown date 1821
Ship	State	Description
Lady Banks	United Kingdom	Lady Banks, Vallance, master, which had been sailing from Bengal to London, and which had put into Mauritius in April with seven feet of water in her hold, had been condemned and sold at Mauritius. Also, a fire had consumed part of her cargo; the rest was to be sold at auction.
Peggy and Jenny	United Kingdom	The ship was wrecked in the Saltee Islands, County Wexford. Her crew were rescued. She was on a voyage from Waterford to Glasgow, Renfrewshire.
Prince Blucher	United Kingdom	The ship sailed from Bengal on 3 May for Mauritius but stranded on the James and Mary Shoal in the Ganges River. She was refloated but was so badly damaged she had to be taken back to Calcutta where she was condemned in June.
Windsor	United Kingdom	The ship was driven ashore near Killala, County Louth. She was on a voyage from Killala to the Clyde.
