= Egfrid =

Egfrid may refer to:

- Egfrid or Ecgred of Lindisfarne (died 845), Bishop of Lindisfarne
- Egfrid or Ecgfrith of Northumbria (c. 645–685), King of Northumbria
- Egfrid (1810 ship), launched at Shields and condemned at Saint Helena in 1821
