= Pusey Hall (ship) =

At least two vessels have been named Pusey Hall (or Pusy Hall), for Pusey Hall Great House, Clarendon Parish, Jamaica:

- Pusey Hall (1784 ship), of 200 tons (bm), was launched at Lancaster in 1784 as a West Indiaman. Pusey Hall, R.Simpson, master, was driven ashore at Cape Lookout, North Carolina in 1790. She was on a voyage from Jamaica to Virginia. A source on shipwrecks in the Americas misidentified her as American.
- Pusey Hall (1808 ship) was launched at Lancaster in 1808 as a West Indiaman. Between 1830 and 1837 she made two voyages as a whaler in the British southern whale fishery. She returned to trade and was wrecked at Patagonia in 1846 while engaged in the guano trade.
