= USS Wasp =

USS Wasp may refer to the following ships of the Continental and United States navies:

- USS Wasp (1775) was a merchant schooner purchased by the Continental Navy in late 1775 and destroyed in 1777
- USS Wasp (1807) was a sloop constructed in 1806 and captured during the War of 1812
- USS Wasp (1810) was a schooner built in 1810 and sold after 1814
- USS Wasp (1813) was a sloop chartered in 1813 and returned to her owners in 1814
- USS Wasp (1814) was a sloop-of-war constructed in 1813 and lost in a storm at sea in 1814.
- USS Wasp (1865), originally the captured Confederate Emma Henry, renamed Wasp in June 1865 and found unfit for further service in 1876
- USS Wasp (1893), was the first steam yacht Columbia launched 1893 by William Cramp, acquired and commissioned in 1898 by the Navy and used as a training ship until sold in 1919
- USS Wasp (SP-1159), a steel-hulled motorboat, was leased by the U.S. Navy and performed patrol duties in 1917
- USS Wasp (CV-7), laid down in 1936, was an aircraft carrier that saw action in World War II until sunk by Japanese submarine I-19 in September 1942
- USS Wasp (CV-18) an aircraft carrier launched in 1943 and served until 1972
- USS Wasp (LHD-1) is lead ship of the Wasp-class amphibious assault ships and was launched in 1989 and in active service
