= Earl of Lonsdale (ship) =

Several ships have been named Earl of Lonsdale for the Earl of Lonsdale:

- Earl of Lonsdale (1810 ship) was launched at Whitehaven. She sailed as West Indiaman. She next made one voyage to the East Indies in 1814, and then returned to the West Indies trade. A gale at Jamaica in October 1815 destroyed her.
- Earl of Lonsdale (1839 ship), of 310 tons burthen, was launched at Whitehaven; she was last listed in 1860
- SS Earl of Lonsdale (1871 ship) was an iron, screw steamer of 1542 grt, launched at Shields, that wrecked in 1885.
