= John Palmer (ship) =

At least three vessels in the Age of Sail have borne the name John Palmer:

- John Palmer (1807 ship) was launched at Plymouth and made voyages to the East Indies and South America before becoming a whaler and making five whaling voyages between 1823 and 1841, when she was broken up
- John Palmer (1810 ship) was built at Calcutta and made one voyage under charter to the British East India Company, wrecking with the loss of all hands in 1814 on the return leg of a second voyage to India
- John Palmer (1814 schooner) was wrecked, with loss of life, in 1818
