= Kingston (1811 ship) =

History

United Kingdom
- Name: Kingston
- Owner: 1811:Richard Gibbs & Son (Note: This company changed its name to George Gibbs and Son, and later again to Gibbs, Son and Bright.); 1817:William Parker; 1832:"Go l" & Co.
- Builder: Sydenham Teast, Wapping Dock, Bristol
- Launched: 8 July 1811
- Fate: Wrecked 1833

General characteristics
- Tons burthen: 493, or 498, or 499, or 504, or 50439/94 (bm)
- Length: 119 ft 1 in (36.3 m)
- Beam: 30 ft 8 in (9.3 m)
- Sail plan: Ship
- Notes: Three decks

Kingston was launched at Bristol in 1811. She traded between Bristol and Jamaica until her owners sold her in 1818. She then made two voyages for the British East India Company (EIC). Afterwards she continued trading with India, and then with Quebec. She was wrecked in 1833.

== Career ==
Kingston appears in Lloyd's Register in 1811 with William Sale, master, Gibbs & Co., owner, and trade Bristol—Jamaica. Sale remained her master until Gibbs & Co. sold her.

In 1817 Gibbs & Son purchased a new Kingston, and sold the old one, with Sale moving to be her master. The Register of Shipping for 1818 shows Kingston's master changing from Sale to Bowen, her owner from Gibbs & Son to Parker, and her trade from Bristol–Jamaica to London–Java.

EIC voyage #1 (1819-1820): Captain William Atkins Bowen sailed from the Downs on 12 July 1819, bound for Bengal. Kingston arrived at Calcutta on 16 November. Homeward bound, she was at Madras on 27 February 1820. she reached the Cape of Good Hope on 22 May and St Helena on 15 June, before arriving at Blackwall on 6 August.

EIC voyage #2 (1821-1822): Captain Bowen sailed from the Downs on 24 June 1821, bound for Bengal. Kingston reached São Tiago on 19 July and Simon's Bay on 14 September. She arrived at Calcutta on 30 November. Homeward bound, she was at Madras on 23 February 1822, the Cape on 21 May, and St Helena on 1 July. She arrived at the Downs on 28 August.

Thereafter Kingston traded with India and Quebec.

Year	Master	Owner	Trade
1825	Bowen	Parker	London—Calcutta
1830	H. Crouch	Parker	London—Quebec
1833	H. Crouch	Parker "Go l" & Co.	London—Quebec

== Fate ==
Kingston was driven ashore and wrecked at Sandgate, Kent, while on a voyage from Quebec City to London. Her crew were rescued.
