= William Ashton (1810 ship) =

UK merchant ship (1810–1830)

History

United Kingdom
- Name: William Ashton
- Owner: Messrs. Burrow & Nottage
- Builder: Messers. Brockbank, Lancaster
- Launched: 5 April 1810
- Fate: Wrecked 9 August 1830

General characteristics
- Tons burthen: 366 (bm)
- Complement: 25
- Armament: 6 × 24 & 8 × 9-pounder carronades

William Ashton was launched at Lancaster in 1810 as a West Indiaman. In 1810 she repelled a French privateer in a single ship action, and in 1813 she captured a ship. Then in 1818–1819 she made one voyage to India, sailing under a licence from the British East India Company (EIC). Thereafter she traded widely until she was wrecked on 9 August 1830 at Newfoundland on her way from Dublin to Quebec.

== Career ==
William Ashton first appeared in Lloyd's Register (LR), in 1810.

Year	Master	Owner	Trade	Source
1810	Greenwood	Burrow	Lancaster–Cork; London–St Croix	LR

Captain Thomas Greenwood's previous command had been the Lancaster-built West Indiaman Pusey Hall.

On 22 August 1810, a French privateer with yellow sides, 20 guns, and full of men approached William Ashton as v was on her way back to England from St Croix. The two vessels exchanged fire for two hours, at times firing from within 40 yards of each other. Greenwood several times filled bottles with small shot and shot that at the French vessel, possibly causing heavy casualties. Eventually, the privateer sailed off. William Ashton was much damaged in her masts and rigging, and had taken several shot between "wind and water".

Captain Thomas Greenwood acquired a letter of marque on 22 September 1810, shortly after arriving back at Lancaster after this action. However, a month later, on 25 October, Captain Thomas Dawson took command of William Ashton and acquired his own letter of marque.

Year	Master	Owner	Trade	Source
1811	Greenwood; Dawson	Burrow	Lancaster–Cork	LR

On 13 April 1813, William Dawson, William Ashton, and Mary captured the American schooner Miranda, which was on her way from Kennebunk to Cuba. The three British ships were coming from St Croix. (Note: Captain Ferguson of William Dawson had not acquired a letter of marque.) (Note: However, the United States privateer Paul Jones recaptured Miranda, only to have HMS Unicorn recapture her. The American schooner Miranda, of Rhode Island, had a crew of six men, and a burthen of 104 tons. She originally had been sailing for Matunzas with a cargo of lumber. On 23 May 1813 HMS Leonidas captured Paul Jones off Ireland. Paul Jones was armed with 16 guns and had a crew of 85 men under the command of Captain Archibald Taylor. She had been out two months and had captured three prizes.)

Year	Master	Owner	Trade	Source
1814	T.Dawson	Burrows & Co.	Falmouth–St Johns	LR
1815	T.Dawson; T.Keen	Burrows & Co.	Falmouth–St Johns; Liverpool–Havana	LR
1816	T.Keen	E.Evans	Liverpool–Philadelphia	LR

On 20 May 1816 William Ashton, Keen, master, arrived at St Johns, New Brunswick, from Jamaica. She had lost two bower anchors when she ran ashore at Shelburne, Nova Scotia. On 8 September she filled with water after she struck on the Coal Rock as she was coming into Liverpool from St John, New Brunswick.

Year	Master	Owner	Trade	Source
1818	S.Baxter; W.Brown	E.Evans	Liverpool–Virginia; Liverpool–Calcutta	LR; damages repaired 1817

In 1813 the EIC had lost its monopoly on the trade between India and Britain. British ships were then free to sail to India or the Indian Ocean under a licence from the EIC. (Note: Although William Ashton made a voyage under a licence from the EIC, she does not appear in the most comprehensive book on vessels of the EIC.)

William Ashton, Brown, master, sailed in April 1818 for Bengal. On 30 September she was at Bengal. On 3 March 1819 she sailed for Liverpool.

Year	Master	Owner	Trade	Source
1820	W.Brown; W.Jameson	Powell & Co.	Liverpool–Calcutta; Liverpool–Jamaica	LR; damages repaired 1817
1821	W.Jameson	Sandback	Liverpool–Jamaica	LR; damages repaired 1817
1823	W.Jameson; C.Hayn	Sandback; M'Inroy	Liverpool–Jamaica	LR; damages repaired 1817
1824	C.Hayn; M.Guy	Milroy	Greenock–Demerara	LR; damages repaired 1817
1825	H.B.Guy	Battersby & Co.	Belfast–Quebec	LR; damages repaired 1817

On 22 May 1824, William Ashton, Captain H.B.Guy, was sailing between the Bermudas and Cape Hatteras when he reported having observed a rock with a circumference of about 100 yards at 38°48′50″N 71°41′20″W. The rock was given the name "Ashton Rock" in contemporary nautical guides. However, the rock did not exist. There were no later confirmatory sightings and in five days of searching in 1850 Lieutenant J. C. Walsh, in the U. S. schooner Taney, could not find the rock. He reported his lack of success to Lieutenant Matthew Fontaine Maury. Later, "Ashton Rock" was included on a list of rocks and the like that had been reported but did not exist.

Year	Master	Owner	Trade	Source
1826	Bellamy	Carr & Co.	London–Quebec	LR; damages repaired 1817
1827	Bellamy; Armstrong	Carr & Co.	London–Quebec	LR; damages repaired 1817 and some repairs 1827
1828	Armstrong; J.Cooper	Dobinson	London–Petersburg	LR; damages repaired 1817, some repairs 1827, new deck and keel 1828
1829	J.Cooper	Dobinson	Bristol–Miramichi	LR; damages repaired 1817, some repairs 1827, new deck and keel 1828

== Fate ==
On 9 August 1830, William Ashton was on her way from Dublin to Quebec when she struck a rock in Fortune Bay, Newfoundland during a fog and quickly filled with water. The crew and passengers were able to reach Harbour Briton.

William Ashton was no longer listed in the 1830 volume of Lloyd's Register.
