= Centurion (1804 ship) =

Age of Sail merchantman (1804–1848)

History

United Kingdom
- Name: Centurion
- Namesake: Centurion
- Owner: Tindall, Scarborough
- Builder: Tindall, Scarborough
- Launched: 14 June 1804
- Fate: Wrecked 22 June 1848

General characteristics
- Tons burthen: 478 (bm)
- Armament: 6 × 6-pounder guns

Centurion was launched in 1804. She initially sailed as a West Indiaman. She made one voyage to India. She then sailed between Britain and Quebec City. Centurion was last listed in 1839, but with data stale since 1834. Centurion, Heppinstall, master, was wrecked in 1848.

== Career ==
She first entered Lloyd's Register (LR) in 1804 with Gladstale, master, Tindall, master, and trade London–Jamaica.

Centurion, W.Meade, master, sailed from England in February 1818, bound for Bombay. She sailed under a license from the British East India Company. Egfrid sailed for England from the Cape of Good Hope but had to put into St Helena on 22 August 1821, leaky. It was expected that she would be condemned and so her cargo was transshipped on Centurion, Mead, master. Egfrid was surveyed and condemned as a constructive total loss on 28 September. Centurion sailed from St Helena on 29 September and arrived at Deal on 4 December, with Egfrid's cargo.

Year	Master	Owner	Trade	Source
1805	Gladstale	Tindall	London–Jamaica	LR 6x6
1808	R. Douglas	Tindall	London–Jamaica	LR 6x6
1810	R. Douglas	Tindall	London–Jamaica	LR 6x6
1813	W. Betty; Parrish	Tindall	London–Jamaica	LR 6x6
1815	Parrish	Tindall	London transport	LR
1820	W. Mead	Tindall	London–Bengal	LR; thorough repair 1817
1822	Mead; Heppenstall	Tindall	London–Calcutta; London–Quebec	LR
1825	J. Bankier	Tindall	London–Quebec	LR

Centurion sprang a leak and was beached on Goose Island, Nova Scotia. She was on a voyage from Quebec City to Bristol, Gloucestershire. She was refloated the same day. She returned to Quebec City on 18 May, then went to Munn's Cove to unload her cargo and undergo repairs.

In a letter from Miramichi dated 13 May 1828, Captain Barkier reported that Superb, Cain, master, was on her way from Bristol to Quebec, when on 23 April, on the Newfoundland Banks, Superb struck ice and was stove in. The next day Cain and two men boarded a schooner; seven crewmen boarded Superb's pinnace but the pinnace drifted off without provisions and it was believed that they had perished. The brig Diana, Lookup, master, took off the remaining 11 crew members. Diana was on her way to the Bay de Chaleurs. Barkier took three of the eleven from Diana and brought them too to Miramichi.

Year	Master	Owner	Trade	Source
1830	J. Bankier	Tindall	London	LR; small repairs 1829
1833	Heppinstall	Tindall	London-Quebec	LR; small repairs 1829
1834	Hippenstall			LR
1839	Hippenstall			LR

== Fate ==
Centurion, Heppenstall, master, was wrecked on 22 June 1848, at St. Shott's, Newfoundland. Her crew were rescued. She was on a voyage from Quebec City to London. She was described as having been built in 1804 as the 100th vessel built by John Tindall, the father of her present owners, the members of Tindall & Co.
