= Sydenham Teast =

Sydenham Teast (1755–1813) was a Quaker merchant, fur-trader, shipbuilder and shipowner based in Bristol, England, during the 18th and 19th centuries.

== Life and career ==
Teast was a shipowner involved in whaling. He had at least eight South Sea whalers between 1786 and 1801. He was also involved in the ivory and timber trade between England and Africa. He constructed Redcliffe Parade in the 1770s, and was also involved in the slave trade, refitting the slaver Hector in 1776. Towards the end of the eighteenth century, Teast became a significant figure in Bristol's trade with Africa. He was not heavily invested in the slave trade.

Teast built two drydocks at Wapping on the Avon in 1755, and a further two at Canon's Marsh on the mouth of the River Frome in 1790. On 9 September 1782, the company launched HMS Hermione, a fifth-rate 32-gun frigate, the only warship the yard ever built.

Ships built by Teast's in Bristol include:

- Dochfour, merchant vessel
- Lion (1744), 220 ton, 32-gun privateer.
- Hermione (1782), 716 ton, 32-gun fifth-rate frigate.
- Kingston, merchant vessel

He held interests in a few other ships that traded on the coast of West Africa including, African Queen, Brothers. Cam's Delight, Jenny, Recovery, and Sydenham.

Teast's Docks lasted until 1832 at Canon's Marsh, and 1841 at Wapping, where the housing and flats of Merchant's Wharf now occupy the site.

He married Eleanor Buckle in 1786, by whom he had two sons Sidenham (a Magistrate) and Richard Buckle, and Mary Irwin in 1798, by whom he had a daughter Mary Irwin Teast (1796 - 1801).
