= Dochfour (1810 ship) =

History

United Kingdom
- Name: Dochfour
- Namesake: Loch Dochfour
- Builder: Sydenham Teast, Bristol
- Launched: 24 March 1810
- Fate: Wrecked 23 October 1846

General characteristics
- Tons burthen: 300, or 34342/94, or 383 (bm)
- Length: 104 ft 4 in (31.8 m)
- Beam: 29 ft 8 in (9.0 m)

Dochfour (or Douchfour) was launched in March 1810 at Bristol. She sent much of her career as a West Indiaman, sailing between Bristol and Grenada. She was wrecked in October 1846.

== Career ==
Dochfour was the first vessel launched at Bristol after the completion of the Floating Harbour in 1809.

Dockfour first appeared in Lloyd's Register (LR) in the volume for 1810.

Year	Master	Owner	Trade	Source
1810	J.Bayley	A.J.Robe	Bristol–Grenada	LR

On 11 August 1813 USS Argus was off Lundy capturing vessels from the homeward bound Leeward Islands Fleet. Dochfour, Baillie, master, was able to escape by using a stratagem. Knowing that he had no chance of escaping, Baillie hoisted a naval ensign and steered towards Argus. Argus was more interested in commerce raiding than combat and sailed towards the other merchantmen. A few days later, on 14 August, HMS Pelican found Argus and captured her after a severe engagement.

On 25 June 1823 Maria, Williams, master, from Jamaica, and Dochfour, Bailey, master, from Grenada, ran on shore in the River Avon, Bristol. Maria was stuck in the mud near the entrance to the Basin. However, Dochfour was further down the river and in a more dangerous situation. Both were got off that night on the next tide, Dochfour with the assistance of HM cutter Vigilant.

During a severe gale on 20 June 1835 at Quebec, Dochfour ran foul of Favorite. Both sustained some damage.

Year	Master	Owner	Trade	Source & notes
1845	Wakeham	Beeston & Co.	Bristol–Quebec	LR; large repair 1835, damages repaired 1835, & small repairs 1845

== Fate ==
Dochfour was wrecked on 23 October 1846 on Cape Bon Ann, Maine, United States. Her crew were rescued. She was on a voyage from Bristol to Quebec City.
