= Prince Regent (1822 ship) =

UK merchant ship and whaler (1822–1826)

History

United Kingdom
- Name: Prince Regent
- Namesake: The Prince Regent
- Launched: 1810, Dunkirk, France
- In service: 1822 (as Prince Regent)
- Fate: Last listed 1831

General characteristics
- Tons burthen: 40, or 42, r 47 (bm)
- Sail plan: Sloop

Prince Regent was launched at Dunkirk in 1810 under another name. She may have been taken in prize. She first appeared Lloyd's Register (LR) as Prince Regent in 1822. She made one voyage to the British southern whale fishery. She essentially disappears from online records after her return circa 1826.

== Career ==
As a consequence of missing pages in Lloyd's Register for 1821, Prince Regent first appeared in Lloyd's Register in 1822. She first appeared in the Register of Shipping (RS), in 1823.

Year	Master	Owner	Trade	Source & notes
1822	Drysdale	Penny	London–Straits	LR
1824	Drysdale; J.King	Penny; Palmer	London–Straits; London-South Seas	LR; large repair 1823 and repairs 1824
1825	J.King	Palmer	Falmouth-"Sh.Isl."	LR; large repair 1823 and repairs 1824

On 21 June 1824, Prince Regent sailed from Gravesend, Kent for Otaheite. On 27 June she was at Falmouth, on her way to the Sandwich Islands, together with Active, Charlton, master, also owned by Palmer. (Note: Active, of 105 tons (bm), had been launched at Shoreham.) On 24 August they sailed for the Sandwich Islands. Both arrived at Valparaiso, Active on 18 January 1825, and Prince Regent on 21 January. Active sailed for the Sandwich Islands on 18 February. Active and Prince Regent both arrived at the Friendly Islands on 3 October. On 4 April 1826 Prince Regent, King, master, arrived at Valparaiso from the Gallapipagos Islands. At some point Prince Regent returned to England, carrying 120 tons of sperm and 105 tuns of whale oil.

Year	Master	Owner	Trade	Source & notes
1827	T.King	Palmer	London–New South Wales	RS

== Fate ==
Lloyd's Register last listed Prince Regent in 1831, with data unchanged since 1825.
