= Lord Wellington (1810 Hull ship) =

British whaling ship, 1810–1834

History

United Kingdom
- Name: Lord Wellington
- Namesake: Arthur Wellesley, 1st Duke of Wellington
- Launched: 1810, Hull
- Fate: Wrecked 15 June 1834

General characteristics
- Tons burthen: 343, or 354, or 361 (bm)
- Propulsion: Sail
- Complement: 41 (1821)
- Armament: 10 × 6&9-pounder guns

Lord Wellington was launched in 1810 at Hull, England. She made 20 voyages to Davis Strait and Greenland as a northern whale fishery whaler. She was lost in June 1834 on her 21st voyage.

== Career ==
Lord Wellington first appeared in Lloyd's Register (LR) in June 1810 with H. Rose, master, and [ W.] Bolton, owner. Her trade was Hull–Davis Strait.

The following data is from Coltish:

Year	Master	Where	Whales	Tuns whale oil
1811	H.Rose	Davis Strait	10	142
1812	Johnson		19	162
1813	Lambert	Greenland	0	0
1814 (Note: Lord Wellington was the second vessel to leave Hull, sailing on 25 February 1814.)	Lambert	Greenland	6	84
1815	Lambert	Greenland	6	84
1815	[Phillip] Dannatt	Greenland	5	68
1816	Dannatt	Davis Strait	3	52
1817	Dannatt	Greenland	3	33 (Note: She also killed 440 seals.)
1818	Dannatt	Greenland	10	143
1819	Dannatt	Greenland	17	118
1820	Dannatt	Greenland	10	152
1821	[John] Boydon	Greenland	15	144

The following data is from Lloyd's Register:

Year	Master	Owner	Trade	Source & notes
1822	Boyden; W.Foster; Nisbet	Bolton & co.	Hull–Davis Strait	LR; repairs 1820 & 1823
1824	W.Nisbet	Bolton & Co.	Hull–Elsinore	LR; repairs 1820 & 1823
1826	J.Harrison	Shackle & Co.	Hull-Greenland	LR; repairs 1820, 1822, 1824, & 1825

In 1825, Lord Wellington was one of the vessels that transferred supplies to Active before leaving the whaling grounds. Active had grounded and there was no hope of getting her off until the next year so her captain and some of his crew decided to stay with her and overwinter there.

The following data is from Coltish:

Year	Master	Where	Whales	Tuns whale oil
1825	Harrison	Davis Strait	8	80
1826	Harrison	Davis Strait	7	93
1827	Harrison	Greenland	13	108
1828	Harrison	Davis Strait	16	199
1829	Harrison	Davis Strait	14	143
1830	Harrison	Davis Strait	1	25
1831	Harrison	Davis Strait	5	50
1832	Harrison	Greenland	1	16
1833	Harrison	Davis Strait	31	190
1834	Harrison	Davis Strait	0	0

The Register of Shipping (RS) for 1833 showed Lord Wellington with Harrison, master, Shackells, owner, and trade Hull–Greenland. She had had damages repaired in 1827 and 1832, and a thorough repair in 1832.

== Fate ==
Lord Wellington was lost on 15 June 1834 in Melville Bay, Greenland. Her crew were rescued.

On 3 June 1834, Lord Wellington got caught in ice. On 16 June she was caught between ice floes and became a total wreck. Captain Richard Harrison and surgeon Robert Maclean went aboard Dorden. The rest of the crew were split between Norfolk and William Torr. (Note: In 1835, both Dorden and William Torr were lost.)
