= Liverpool (1815 ship) =

History

United Kingdom
- Name: Liverpool
- Namesake: Liverpool
- Builder: Michael Smith, Howrah, Calcutta
- Launched: 1815
- Fate: Wrecked May 1823

General characteristics
- Tons burthen: 515, or 527 (bm)
- Notes: Teak-built

Liverpool was launched at Calcutta in 1815. She traded between Britain and India under a license from the EIC, and was lost in May 1823.

In 1813 the British East India Company (EIC) lost its monopoly on the trade between India and Britain. British ships were then free to sail to India or the Indian Ocean under a license from the EIC.

Liverpool first appeared in Lloyd's Register (LR) in 1816 with J.Green, master, Capt. & Co., owners, and trade Liverpool–India. Thereafter she traded between Britain and India under a license from the EIC.

In 1819 her master was James Green, and her owner was Palmer & Co.

== Loss ==
Liverpool was lost on the Long Sand, Bay of Bengal, on 27 May 1823 in a hurricane. There were only four survivors of her crew. Lloyd's Register for 1824 showed Liverpool with J. Green, master, Capt.& Co., owners, and trade Liverpool–Calcutta. The entry had the notation "lost" by her name.

Liverpool and Oracabessa were both lying in Saugor Roads when the gale came up. The storm drove Oracabessa on to the Long Sand, where she grounded. The hull survived the night and the next day all aboard were able to reach Kedgeree or the shore in the longboat or on a raft. Liverpool, by contrast, was lost with the loss of all but four members of her crew.

Liverpool grounded in the gale. During the night of the 27th, the seas swept the captain, pilot, and officers from the poop. Seas proceeded to sweep away almost the entire rest of the crew, ten or 14 men at a time. When the four survivors were rescued on the 29th, the vessel was under the sand with only her foremast, on which they had taken refuge, still standing. The Bengal Pilot service vessel Hattras had dispatched Row Boat No.9, which rescued the four survivors.

The pilot vessel Flora escaped to sea. The Floating Light Vessel almost sank, but eventually was able to go up to Kedgeree, with two feet of water in her tweendecks from seas that had washed over her, and leaky. The brigs Helen and Cuttack, and a sloop, were also lost.
