= Pusey Hall (1808 ship) =

UK merchant ship and whaler (1808–1846)

History

United Kingdom
- Name: Pusey Hall
- Namesake: Pusey Hall Great House, Clarendon Parish, Jamaica
- Builder: Brockbank, Lancaster
- Launched: 19 November 1808
- Fate: Grounded 18 September 1846 and subsequently sold

General characteristics
- Tons burthen: 312, or 31250/94 or 334, or 33420/94, or 342 (bm)
- Length: 101 ft 0 in (30.8 m)
- Beam: 27 ft 6 in (8.4 m)
- Complement: 1810: 25; 1840: 16
- Armament: 14 × 9-pounder carronades.

Pusey Hall was launched at Lancaster in 1808 as a West Indiaman. Between 1830 and 1837 she made two voyages as a whaler in the British southern whale fishery. She returned to trade and was wrecked at Patagonia in 1846 while engaged in the guano trade.

== Career ==
Pusey Hall was launched at Brockbank's Yard in Lancaster for James Moore & Co., who intended her for the Jamaica trade. Her first master was Captain Greenwood.

Pucy Hall first appeared in Lloyd's Register (LR) in 1809.

Year	Master	Owner	Trade	Source
1809	Greenwood	Moore & Co.	Lancaster–Jamaica	LR
1810	N.Carter	Moore & Co.	Lancaster–Jamaica	LR

Captain Nicholas Carter acquired a letter of marque on 27 July 1810. She had been authorized to sail single, and to chase, capture, man, and convoy [prizes] to port. (Note: Captain Greenwood next commanded the Lancaster vessel William Ashton, in which in August 1810 he successfully repelled an attack by a French privateer.)

Year	Master	Owner	Trade	Source
1818	N.Carter; Head	Moore & Co.	Cork; London–Barbados	LR
1820	I.H.Head	I.H.Head	London–Barbados	LR

On 23 April 1819, Thorn, Ashcroft, master, was at Barbados when a gust of wind pushed her on her beam ends (side). This caused 20 hogsheads of sugar, which was on deck, to shift all the way to her larbord bulwarks, leading observers to fear that she would be lost. Captain Head, of Pusey Hall, was passing in his boat when the accident occurred. He jumped aboard Thorn and by his exertions prevented her from foundering.

From about July 1819 on, Pusey Hall's master was Foster, and she started trading between London and Quebec. By 1820 Head was again master, and Pusey Hall was again trading with he West Indies, including Barbados.

In 1824 Pusey Hall traded with Petersburg, with Stevenson, master. On her return, Head again became master, and again traded with the West Indies.

Year	Master	Owner	Trade	Source & notes
1825	I.H.Head	I.H.Head	London–Demerara	LR; some repairs 1824
1828	I.H.Head	Captain & Co.	London–Saint Lucia	LR; some repairs 1824, & new wales, upper works, & some repairs 1828
1830	I.H.Head; Newby	Captain & Co.	London–Saint Lucia	LR; new wales & upper works, & some repairs 1828 and 1830
1831	Newby	Mellish & Co.	London–South Seas	LR; new wales & upper works, & some repairs 1828

In 1830 the shipowner William Mellish purchased Pusey Hall to sail her as a whaler in the southern whale fishery. Mellish picked Robert Newby as the master for both her whaling voyages. (Note: For a highly detailed account of both voyages, with maps, see the article by Rhys and Chisholm.)

1st whaling voyage (1830–1833): Captain Robert Newby sailed from England on 18 June 1830, bound for the Japans. On 2 May 1831 Pusey Hall was at Honolulu, and on 29 June she was at the Japan grounds.

On 1 December Pusey Hall struck a reef near Wallaces Island. Her damage was limited to the loss of fifteen feet of her false keel and three feet torn off her forefoot. Then on 20 December Captain Newby led an attack on local natives. The attackers suffered one man wounded; an unknown number of locals were killed.

In April 1832 Pusey Hall was at Guam. In November she stopped at Monterey, California. Scurvy had debilitated the crew, and the ship was leaky and needed careening.

Pusey Hall arrived back at England on 5 September 1833 with 400 casks of whale oil.

2nd whaling voyage (1833–1837): Captain Newby sailed from England on 7 December 1833, bound for New Zealand. Pusey Hall was reported to have been at Bay of Islands on 30 January 1836 and near Hawaii on 26 June. On 25 January 1837 she was again at Bay of Islands. She returned to England on 5 October 1837 with over 1700 barrels of whale oil.

William Mellish had died before Pusey Hall arrived back in London. The Times reported on 24 November 1837, that Pusey Hall and another Mellish vessel, Sir James Cockburn, had been sold; Pusey Hall sold for £2050 and Sir James Cockburn sold for £2850.

Year	Master	Owner	Trade	Source & notes
1837	R.Newby			LR
1838	Ware	Speck	London	LR; new wales & topside, & some repairs 1838
1839	Ware	Speck; Ware & Co.	London–Quebec	LR; new wales & topside, & some repairs 1838

On 10 April 1839 Kingston foundered in the Atlantic Ocean while on a voyage from Bristol, Gloucestershire to New York, United States. Thomas Nailer took on board all the crew and passengers. Thomas Nailer (or Thomas Naylor), did not have sufficient provisions but was able to pass on six passengers to Pusey Hall. Pusey Hall took the passengers to Quebec.

Year	Master	Owner	Trade	Source & notes
1844	Ware	Ware & Co.	London–Quebec; London–Icheboe	LR; new wales & topside, some repairs 1838, and damages repaired 1844

On 1 March 1845 Pusey Hall, Ware, master, was at Possession Island, loading guano. On 31 July she arrived at Gravesend, Kent.

On 5 October Pusey Hall left Deal for Lima. In September 1846 she was at the Falkland Islands. She was one of a dozen vessels that were on the coast of Patagonia and had gone ahead to the Islands in the hope of finding provisions. She found the 100 or so islanders subsisting on beef, most employed by the British government in making roads. While she was there the transport Trafalgar, Lieutenant Alexander, arrived with provisions for the islanders. Trafalgar provide Pusey Hall with twelve days of supplies, but no more. Trafalgar left the Falklands on 19 September and returned to England. (Note: Trafalgar was probably the transport of 739 tons launched at Sunderland in 1845.)

== Fate ==
Pusey Hall was reported on 29 January 1848 to have stranded and been condemned at Santa Cruz, Patagonia. She was last listed in 1846. Her loss gave rise to a court case when her insurers declined the claim of £1000 for her total loss.

Prior to sailing for the Falkland Islands, Pusey Hall had spent her time on the Patagonian coast gathering guano. On 4 August 1846 she had sailed for Fort William on Soledad (East Falkland) Island to seek out provisions. At the time she had 300 tons of guano aboard. She left the Falklands on 5 September to return to Patagonia to complete her cargo of 500 tons. On 16 September as she was coming back to Santa Cruz she grounded. Her cargo was removed and transferred to another vessel. On 23 September her insurance expired. On 28 September she was found to have sustained a great deal of damage. Between 12 and 13 October she was refloated and taken to Santa Cruz. She could not be repaired at there because of a want of materials and skilled workmen, and was not seaworthy enough to be sailed to Monte Video or other port. On 23 October Captain Ware sold her for £72 10s, which covered the costs of the sale; there was no salvage. The first court verdict found for the defendants, the insurers. The plaintiffs appealed. The appeals court found a partial loss but no total loss as Ware had not given notice of abandonment. The court recommended that plaintiffs and defendants choose an arbitrator to determine the amount; if the parties were unable or unwilling to do so, the case would be put before a jury to determine the amount. The parties chose not to appoint an arbitrator and the case again went to trial.
