= Monarch (1810 ship) =

British coaster and whaler 1810–1839

History

United Kingdom
- Name: Monarch
- Owner: 1810: Jn. Holt and William Skinner; 1813: Montrose Whale Fishing Co.
- Builder: Holt and Richardson, Whitby
- Launched: 1810
- Fate: Last listed 1838, but sold in 1839 and still sailing for some time

General characteristics
- Tons burthen: 308, or 309, or 311 (bm
- Armament: 6 × 9-pounder carronades

Monarch was launched at Whitby in 1810. In 1803 her owners sold her to the Montrose Whale Fishing Company. Between 1813 and 1839 she made 27 annual voyages to the northern whale fishery. Her most successful years were 1823 when she killed 28 whales and brought in 193 tuns of whale oil, and 1832 when she killed 24 whales and brought in 205 tuns of whale oil. She was last listed in 1838. However, she was sold in 1839 and still sailing to the Baltic for some time.

== Career ==
Monarch first appeared in the Register of Shipping in the volume for 1810.

Year	Master	Owner	Trade	Source
1810	Dickson	Holt & Co.	Whitby–Shields	RS

Initially Monarch sailed as a coaster between Whitby and Shields. Then in 1813 her owners sold her to Montrose, and she assumed Montrose Registry.

The French Revolutionary (1793–1802) and Napoleonic (1803–1814) Wars resulted in a reduction in whaling as sailors were diverted to the navy, causing a rise in wages for those still in whaling and mercantile trade. Owners of whalers had to compete with the Navy for stores, and the whalers came to carry guns to protect themselves from privateers.

Towards the end of the Napoleonic Wars, oil prices started to rise more sharply than costs. The whale fishery was also more productive as the reduced activity earlier had helped stocks of whales improve. Consequently, the number of whalers and whaling from Scotland started to increase.

As a whaler, Monarch carried six to seven whaleboats, which did the actual whaling. The ship was a means for getting the boats and their crews to the whaling grounds, and their catch home. By law, each whaler had to carry one boat and six-man crew for every 50 tons burthen. In all, Monarch carried 46–50 men.

The whaling data below is primarily from the Scottish Arctic Whaling Voyages database, augmented with reports from Lloyd's List and other contemporary newspaper sources. When there are two numbers for whales or tuns in a cell, the second is from Jackson.

Year	Master	Where	Whales	Tuns whale oil	Seals
1813	A.Young	Greenland	6		3
1814	A.Young	Greenland	20	171	0
1815	A.Young	Greenland	7	96	0
1816	A.Young	Greenland	6	85	0
1817	A.Young	Greenland	3	54/44	108
1818	A.Young	Greenland	8	115	0
1819	A.Young	Greenland	5	88	
1820	A.Young	Greenland	3	41	0
1821	A.Young	Greenland	19	152	0
1822	Young	Greenland	3	47	0
1823	Young	Greenland	28/26	193	0
1824	Inglis	Davis Strait	11	129/130	0
1825	Inglis	Davis Strait	3	40	0
1826	Inglis	Davis Strait	4/3	50/48	0
1827	Inglis	Greenland	7	70	0
1828	Davidson	Davis Strait	11	143	0
1829	Davidson	Davis Strait	6	70/65	0
1830	Davidson	Davis Strait	3/5	30/35	0
1831	Davidson	Davis Strait	1	11/10	0
1832	Davidson	Davis Strait	24	205	0
1833	Fulton (or Tuston)	Davis Strait	23	160	0

The Montrose Whaling Company went into voluntary liquidation in November 1833. Her owners were unable to find buyers for their two ships or their boiling houses. Cheap oil was coming from the British southern whale fishery. Also, the arrival of Free Trade ended penal tariffs on foreign oil.

The company's manager, James Guthrie, continued to dispatch Eliza Swan and Monarch to Davis Strait, but catches were poor. In 1836 Monarch came home a "clean ship", having failed to catch anything.

The whaling data below is primarily from the Scottish Arctic Whaling Voyages database, augmented with reports from Lloyd's List and other contemporary newspaper sources. When there are two numbers for whales or tuns in a cell, the second is from Jackson.

Year	Master	Where	Whales	Tuns whale oil	Seals
1834	Fulton	Davis Strait	9	52	0
1835	Fulton	Davis Strait	3	45/54	0
1836	Burn	Davis Strait	0	0	0
1837	Burn	Davis Strait	1	13	0
1838	Cramond (or Crammon)	Greenland	3	50	300
1839	Marshall	Greenland	4	42/44	1500

== Fate ==
Monarch was last listed in 1838. Whaling was in decline in Scotland. (In Whitby, the last whaling voyage took place in 1837.)

In 1839, the shipbuilder Charles Birnie finally purchased the Montrose Whaling Company's assets. He advertised the yard for sale and put the two vessels into the Baltic trade. Monarch went back to being a merchantman, carrying flax and other cargoes.
