= Lady Banks (1810 ship) =

UK merchant ship 1810–1821

History

United Kingdom
- Name: Lady Banks
- Builder: Boston, Lincolnshire
- Launched: 1810
- Fate: Condemned 1821; sold and subsequently disappears from online records

General characteristics
- Tons burthen: 414 (bm)
- Armament: 8 × 18-pounder carronades

Lady Banks was launched in 1810 at Boston. After some voyages as a transport and West Indiaman she sailed to India under a license from the British East India Company. She was condemned at Mauritius in 1821. However, a local merchant repaired and purchased her and sailed her to China.

== Career ==
Lady Banks first entered Lloyd's Register (LR) in 1810 with Meadburn, owner, but no master or trade. The next year the Register of Shipping listed Meadburn as Lady Banks's master and owner, and her trade was London transport, i.e., a vessel based in London sailing under contract to the UK government.

On 17 October 1815 a major gale hit Jamaica. Lady Banks struck ground at Port Maria and lost her rudder, but she was kept afloat.

Then in February 1818 Lady Banks, Walker, master, was on her way to Madras when she ran aground at Gravesend. She was gotten off with some damage to her rudder and proceeded to Northfleet to be examined. About a month later, at end-March, she was again outward bound for Madras and Bengal when she lost her rudder to a cable off Lymington.

On 18 March 1820, Lady Banks, Coppin, master, sailed for Bombay, under a license from the EIC. On 15 August she arrived at Bengal from Madras and London. Captain Edmond Coppin apparently died at Bengal; his widow remarried in 1822.

== Apparent fate ==
As Lady Banks was sailing back to London from Bengal she had to put into Point de Galle with six feet of water in her hold. Then, on 8 April 1821 she had to put into Mauritius with seven feet of water in her hold. She was surveyed before 16 April and as the survey found her timbers to be sound it was decided to repair her.

The next report was that Lady Banks had been condemned at the Cape of Good Hope, and that her passengers were coming home in the Danish ship Antoinette. The last report, dated Mauritius, 23 May, was that Lady Banks, Vallance, master, which had been sailing from Bengal to London, had been condemned and sold at Mauritius. Also, a fire had consumed part of her cargo; the rest was to be sold at auction.

== Court case ==
A court case in London by the owners of chests of indigo aboard Lady Banks revealed that she had left Calcutta on 21 December 1820, and Trincomalee on 17 February 1821. She ran into bad weather and had to throw several hundred bags of sugar, part of her cargo, overboard. She arrived at Mauritius on 24 March and was run aground to preserve vessel and the remaining cargo. The cargo was unloaded so that she could be examined. While it was in a warehouse, fire damaged some of it. Captain Vallance, acting in good faith and under instruction of the Vice admiralty court at Mauritius, then abandoned Lady Banks and all her remaining cargo. The court in England found for the plaintiffs, the owners of the cargo.

A local merchant at Mauritius purchased Lady Banks and sailed her to China.
