= Earl of Lonsdale (1810 ship) =

History

United Kingdom
- Name: Earl of Lonsdale
- Namesake: Earl of Lonsdale
- Owner: 1810:Still & Co.; 1813:Faith & Co.
- Builder: Whitehaven
- Launched: 12 February 1810
- Fate: Wrecked 1815

General characteristics
- Tons burthen: 49821/94, or 503 (bm)
- Armament: 18 × 12&9-pounder guns

Earl of Lonsdale was launched at Whitehaven in 1810. She sailed as West Indiaman. She next made one voyage to the East Indies in 1814, and then returned to the West Indies trade. A gale at Jamaica in October 1815 destroyed her.

== Career ==
Earl of Lonsdale first appeared in Lloyd's Register (LR) in 1810 with Craik, master, Stitt & Co., owners, and trade Whithaven–West Indies.

On 7 February 1811 Earl of Londsdale, Creak, master, was at Gravesend, having returned from Jamaica. On 18 Fgebruary she was at Falmouth, on her way back to Jamaica. On 22 August she was at Deal, and on 23 August Gravesend, having returned from Jamaica.

On 20 April 1813 Earl of Lonsdale, Campbell, master, sailed for Jamaica. On 26 July she sailed from Negril as part of a convoy bound for London and escort by HMS Asia.

In 1813 the British East India Company (EIC) lost its monopoly on trade between Britain and the East Indies. A number of shipowners immediately employed their vessels in that trade. On 31 December 1813, Earl of Lonsdale, Fotheringham, master, Faith & Co., owners, sailed from London to Batavia under a license from the EIC. On April 30, 1814, she was at the Cape of Good Hope. 22 July she sailed from Java for London with a cargo that included coffee. She was off Hastings on 24 November.

Lloyd's Register for 1814 showed Earl of Lonsdale with Campbell, master, changing to Fotheringham, Faith & Co., owner, and trade London–Jamaica, changing to London–India.

Earl of Lonsdale, Fotheringham, master, sailed from Deal on 22 May 1815, bound for Jamaica. She arrived at Antigua on 23 June, and Jamaica on 1 July.

== Fate ==
Earl of Lonsdale, Fotheringham, master, was driven ashore on 17 October 1815 in a hurricane at Annotto Bay. Entries in Lloyd's Register in 1816 showed her trade as only London–Jamaica.
