= Sappho (1810 ship) =

UK merchant ship 1810–1833

History

United Kingdom
- Name: Sappho
- Namesake: Sappho
- Builder: Sunderland
- Launched: 1810
- Fate: Stranded 9 July 1833

General characteristics
- Tons burthen: 401, or 419, or 420 (bm)
- Complement: 1810:32; 1811:32
- Armament: 1810:12 × 18&9-pounder guns; 1811:12 × 18&9-pounder guns; 1811:4 × 9-pounder guns + 8 × 12-pounder carronades

Sappho was launched in 1810 in Sunderland. She traded widely, first as a West Indiaman and later to the Baltic. She also made one voyage to India, sailing under a licence from the British East India Company (EIC). She stranded on 9 July 1823, was gotten off, condemned, and sold. She was wrecked in 1833.

== Career ==
Sappho first appeared in Lloyd's Register (LR) in 1810.

Year	Master	Owner	Trade	Source
1810	C.Compton	Francis Baring	London–Suriname	LR

On 31 March 1810 Captain Charles Spencer Compton acquired a letter of marque.

Year	Master	Owner	Trade	Source
1812	C.Compton; Cranitch	Sir F. Baring	London–Suriname	LR

Captain William Cranitch acquired a letter of marque on 5 December 1811.

Year	Master	Owner	Trade	Source
1818	Price	Thompson & Co.	London–Isle de France (Mauritius)	LR; thorough repair 1816

In 1813 the EIC had lost its monopoly on the trade between India and Britain. British ships were then free to sail to India or the Indian Ocean under a licence from the EIC.

On 30 March 1817 Sappho, W.Grice, master, sailed for Bombay, under a license from the EIC.

Year	Master	Owner	Trade	Source
1819	Price; T.Arman	Thompson & Co.	London–Isle de France; London–Jamaica	LR; thorough repair 1816
1821	T.Arman; Heppinstal	Herring	London–Jamaica; London–Malta	LR; thorough repair 1816
1824	Heppinstall	Staniforth	Plymouth–Chioza	LR; thorough repair 1816 & damages repaired 1822
1825	Heppinstall	Dawson & Co.	Plymouth	LR; thorough repair 1816 & damages repaired 1822
1826	J.Smith; M.Craig; Wilkie	Nichols & Co.	Falmouth–St Johns	LR; thorough repair 1816, damages repaired 1822, & large repair 1826
1827	C.Wlkie	Johnson & Co.	Leith–Petersburg	LR
1828	C.Wlkie	Johnson & Co.	London–Elsinor	LR; large repair 1826
1829	C.Wlkie; Holmes	Vertue & Co.	London–Petersburg	LR; good repair 1826 & large repair 1828
1830	Holmes; Mullins	Vertue & Co.	London–Sierra Leone	LR; good repair 1826 & large repair 1828
1832	T.Duncan	Vertue & Co.	Leith–Alloa	LR; good repair 1826, large repair 1828, & new bottom and large repair 1832

== Fate ==
On 9 July 1833 Sappho, Duncan, master, was on her way from Savannah to Saint John, New Brunswick, when she stranded on "the Wolves" (the Wolves Archipelago, at the entrance to the Bay of Fundy). The crew was saved. Sappho and her cargo were to be sold at Saint Andrews, New Brunswick.
