= Egfrid (1810 ship) =

British transport ship condemned in 1821

History

United Kingdom
- Name: Egfrid
- Namesake: Egfrid
- Owner: Brown & Co.
- Builder: Temple of Jarrow, South Shields
- Launched: 28 August 1810
- Fate: Condemned 1821

General characteristics
- Tons burthen: 450, or 45024/94 (bm)
- Armament: 10 × 18-pounder carronades

Egrid (or Egfried) was launched at Shields in 1810. She was initially a London-based transport but then after the British East India Company in 1813 lost its monopoly on the trade between Britain and the East Indies started trading with India. Egfrid put into St Helena in September 1821 leaky and was condemned there and her cargo transshipped on another vessel.

== Career ==
Egfrid first appeared in Lloyd's Register (LR) in 1810 as "Elfrid" with G. Taylor, master, and Templer, owner. Lloyd's Register still carried the Elfrid name in 1811, but with unchanging data. It also carried the Egfrid.

Year	Master	Owner	Trade	Source
1811	S.Taylor; J.Findlay	Temple; Brown	London; London transport	LR
1811	S.Taylor; Finlay	Captain; T. & R. Brown	Shields–London; London transport	Register of Shipping (RS)
1815	Finlay	T. & R. Brown	London transport	RS; no data in LR
1818	Kirby	T. Brown	London–India	LR
1820	Kirby	T. Brown	London–Fort William (Calcutta)	LR
1822	Brown	T.&R. Brown	Calcutta	RS

== Fate ==
Egfrid, Brown, master, arrived at Bengal from London and Mauritius prior to 9 December 1820.

She left Bengal and put into Mauritius from where she was expected to sail on 1 May 1821. She then sailed to the Cape of Good Hope and arrived there leaky on 4 July. It was expected that she would have to discharge part of her cargo to repair, and then would sail for London in the first week of August.

She sailed for England but had to put into St Helena on 22 August, leaky. It was expected that she would be condemned and so her cargo was transshipped on Centurion, Mead, master.

Egfrid was surveyed and condemned as a constructive total loss on 28 September. She was then sold at public auction on 23 October for breaking up.

Centurion, Meade, master, sailed from St Helena on 29 September and arrived at Deal on 4 December, with Egfrid's cargo.
