= Oracabessa (1810 ship) =

History

United Kingdom
- Name: Oracabessa
- Namesake: Oracabessa
- Builder: Thomas Walton, Hull
- Launched: 16 November 1810
- Fate: Foundered 27 May 1823

General characteristics
- Tons burthen: 370, or 384, or 386 (bm)
- Armament: 4 × 6-pounder guns + 6 × 6-pounder carronades

Oracabessa (or Orracabezza) was launched in 1810 at Hull. She was initially a West Indiaman but then from 1818 she started trading with India. She foundered in a hurricane in the Bay of Bengal in 1823.

== Career ==
Oracabessa first appeared in Lloyd's Register (LR) in 1811 with S. Beatty, master, Moxon, owner, and trade Hull–London, followed by London–Jamaica. She had had damages repaired. In 1815 her master was R.Cowham, changing to Collier, her owner was still Moxon, and her trade was still London–Jamaica.

In 1813 the EIC had lost its monopoly on the trade between India and Britain. British ships were then free to sail to India or the Indian Ocean under a license from the EIC.

Year	Master	Owner	Trade	Source& notes
1818	T.Milne; Thompson	Shedden	London–New Brunswick; London–India	LR; damages repaired 1815
1820	Thompson	Pagan & Co.	London–India	LR; damages repaired 1815
1823	Thompson	Farley	London–Île de France (Mauritius)	LR; damages repaired 1815

Lloyd's List (LL) reported on 13 January 1818 that Oracabessa had arrived in Portsmouth, having sailed from Jamaica on 11 November 1817. Oracabessa reported having seen a two-decker, believed to be Spanish, on shore in "the Gulf". Captain Thompson sailed for the Île de France on 16 May 1818.

On 26 July 1821 Orracabezza, Thompson, master, put into Bahia leaky. She was going to have to discharge her cargo to deal with the leak. She was on a voyage from Gibraltar to Mauritius.

== Fate ==
On 27 May 1823 Oracabessa foundered on the Long Sand in a hurricane in the Bay of Bengal while on the way to Mauritius. Captain Carmichael and the 35-7 men of the crew were saved. The volume of Lloyd's Register for 1824 carried the annotation "lost" beneath her name.

Oracabessa and Liverpool were both lying in Saugor Roads when the gale came up. Even though she had three anchors out, the gale drove Oracabessa onto Long Sand. Her crew cutaway her masts and rigging, as the seas broke over her. She survived the night and next morning the chief mate, leadsman, and all but seven of the crew took to her longboat. They rigged a storm sail, and made for Kedgeree. They got through the breakers, though they frequently had to bail out the longboat, and after about an hour and a half after leaving Oracabessa they reached Kedgeree. In the afternoon Captain Carmichael, the second mate, the pilot, and the remaining crew members fashioned a raft with which they safely reached shore.

Liverpool, by contrast, was lost with the loss of all but four members of her crew. The brigs Helen and Cuttack, and a sloop, were also lost.
