= John Palmer (1810 ship) =

British India ship 1810–1814

History

United Kingdom
- Name: John Palmer
- Owner: J. Palmer & Co.
- Builder: Michael Smith, Calcutta
- Launched: 1810
- Fate: Wrecked 1814

General characteristics
- Tons burthen: 876, or 877, or 895, (bm)
- Propulsion: Sail
- Armament: 18 × 12&6-pounder guns

John Palmer was built at Calcutta in 1810. She made two voyages, the first under charter to the British East India Company (EIC). She wrecked with the loss of all hands in 1814 on the return leg of her second voyage.

Captain Hugh Atkins Reid sailed from Calcutta for England on 21 December 1810 under charter to the EIC. John Palmer was at Saugor on 12 March 1811 and Mauritius on 7 May. She reached Saint Helena on 20 July and arrived at the Downs on 24 September. In England she underwent repairs and fitting out that cost £2417 1s 5d.

On 8 July 1812 Reid sailed for Bengal and Bourbon Island Réunion. On 6 September John Palmer sailed from Madeira in a convoy under escort of HMS Minden. They were "all well" on the 20th at 12°N 25°W.

== Fate ==
John Palmer was homeward bound from Bourbon with a cargo mostly of cotton and in company with other ships when she stopped at Saint Helena. There she took on some passengers before she left on 3 February, again in company with other ships. She parted from her companions on 18 February at the Azores. On 9 March 1814 she stranded at Ovar, on the Portuguese coast. She slipped off and sank with the loss of all hands.
