= USS Wasp (1810) =

History

United States
- Name: USS Wasp
- Namesake: The wasp, a stinging insect
- Completed: 1810
- Acquired: 1812
- Commissioned: July 1812
- Fate: Sold, probably in 1814

General characteristics
- Type: Schooner
- Tonnage: 55
- Length: 59 ft 0 in (17.98 m)
- Beam: 17 ft 3 in (5.26 m)
- Draft: 6 ft 3 in (1.91 m)
- Sail plan: schooner-rigged
- Complement: 40 officers and enlisted men
- Armament: 1812: 1 x long 6-pounder gun; Early 1813:1 x long 9-pounder; Late 1813: 1 x long 4-pounder

The third USS Wasp was a schooner that served in the U.S. Navy from 1812 to 1814.

Wasp was built in 1810 at Baltimore, Maryland. She received a privateer's warrant from the United States government in July 1812 when she put to sea for a privateering foray into the West Indies. During that cruise, she stopped three British merchantmen, allowed one to continue because she carried nothing of value, and took the other two as prizes. While putting a prize crew on board the last of the three, the schooner Dawson, the British 22-gun Sixth Rate Post-ship HMS Garland surprised Wasp. Both captor and prize hoisted full sail and got underway. Because Garland chose to chase Wasp, the prize crew easily took Dawson to safety at Savannah, Georgia. Wasp managed to outsail her pursuer; after sailing through a hurricane that cost her both her masts she finally returned to Baltimore on 28 November 1812.

At Baltimore, Wasp's owners sold her to a group of businessmen who refitted and rearmed her with a long 9-pounder and then chartered her to the United States Navy as a dispatch boat during the summer of 1813. She passed her brief period of naval service without incident, and the U.S. Navy returned her to her owners that autumn.

On 1 October 1813, Wasp was sold at auction at Baltimore. The two merchants who purchased her, Mr. Joseph Lane and Mr. Thomas White, refitted her, rearmed her with a long 4-pounder, and sent her to sea as a privateer. Her second cruise appears to have met with even less success than her first, for the last reference to her career was an advertisement the Baltimore American newspaper ran on 4 August 1814 which called her owners to a meeting on 11 August 1814 to settle accounts. Presumably, she was sold.

However, when the privateer Harpy returned to her home port of Salem, Massachusetts in either 1814 or 1815, she reported "that the USS Wasp was off the Canaries doing a great business among the English merchant ships". As Wasp was in US Naval service during the summer of 1813, this record may relate to that period rather than to 1814 or 1815. It is also possible that this record relates to a later USS Wasp.
