= Commander-in-Chief, Devonport =

Former senior appointment in the Royal Navy

- Appointer: First Lord of the Admiralty
- Precursor: Commander-in-Chief, Plymouth
- Formation: 1845
- First holder: Admiral of the White: Sir John West
- Final holder: Admiral Sir Algernon Lyons
- Abolished: 1900
- Succession: Commander-in-Chief, Plymouth

The Commander-in-Chief, Devonport, was a senior Royal Navy appointment first established in 1845. The office holder was the Port Admiral responsible for the command and administration of the Devonport Station. The appointment continued until 1900 when the Devonport Station was renamed back to the Plymouth Station and this title in name was abolished.

== History ==
In 1845 the title of the Commander-in-Chief, Plymouth was changed to Commander-in-Chief, Devonport. This office existed until 1900 when the Devonport Station was renamed back to its former name.

== Office Holders ==
- 1845 – 1848 Admiral of the White: Sir John West.
- 1848 – 1851 Admiral of the Red: Sir William Hall Gage.
- 1851 – 1854 Admiral of the Red: Sir John Ommanney
- 1854 – 1857 Admiral of the White: Sir William Parker.
- 1857 – 1860 Vice-Admiral of the Red: Sir Barrington Reynolds.
- Jun 1860 – Oct 1860 Vice-Admiral of the Red: Sir Arthur Fanshawe.
- 1860 – 1863 Admiral of the Blue: Sir Houston Stewart.
- 1863 – 1866 Vice-Admiral of the Red: Sir Charles Fremantle.
- 1866 – 1869 Admiral Sir William Martin
- 1869 – 1872 Admiral Sir Henry Codrington.
- 1872 – 1875 Vice-Admiral Sir Henry Keppel.
- 1875 – 1877 Admiral Sir Thomas Symonds
- 1877 – 1880 Admiral Sir Arthur Farquhar.
- 1880 – 1881 Admiral Sir Charles Elliot (1818-1895)
- 1881 – 1884 Admiral Sir William Houston Stewart.
- 1884 – 1887 Admiral Sir Augustus Phillimore
- 1887 – 1888 Admiral Lord John Hay
- 1888 – 1890 Admiral Sir William Dowell
- 1890 – 1893 Admiral The Duke of Edinburgh
- 1893 – 1896 Admiral Sir Algernon Lyons
- 1896 – 1899 Admiral Sir Edmund Fremantle.
- 1899 – 1900 Admiral Sir Henry Fairfax.
