= List of ships named Fairlie =

Several ships have been named Fairlie:

- Fairlie, of 500 tons (bm), was launched at Calcutta in 1788. She burnt in Madras Roads on 8 April 1798. Arson was suspected.
- Fairlie (1810 ship) was launched at Calcutta and sailed to England. There she became a regular ship for the British East India Company (EIC). Including her voyage to England, she made four voyages for the EIC. From around 1821 on she became a Free Trader. She continued to trade with India under a license from the EIC, but also made two voyages transporting convicts to New South Wales (1834), and Tasmania (1852). She made several voyages carrying immigrants to South Australia, New South Wales, and British Guiana. She foundered in November 1865.
- Fairlie was a boat that capsized off Norfolk Island on 14 February 1840. Her master and two more of the 15 men aboard her drowned.
- Fairlie (1865 ship), of 599 tons, was launched at Glasgow by Hedderwicke for Sandbach Tinne & Co.; sold in 1888 to J.A.Verduga & Co. of Valparaiso, Chile, who renamed her Teresa Garnham. She was wrecked 20 February 1891.
