= Baring (East Indiaman) =

Two vessels named Baring served in the 19th Century as East Indiamen for the British East India Company (EIC):

- Baring (1801 Indiaman) made six voyages to India for the EIC between 1802 and 1814. Her owners then sold her and under new owners she made two voyages transporting convicts to Australia. Her last appearance in Lloyd's Register is in 1820.
- Baring (1809 ship) was launched at Calcutta in 1805 as Alexander Brodie. Her owners sold her to Portuguese interests that named her Asia Felix. They in turn sold her to British owners in 1809 who renamed her Baring. She made one voyage for the EIC between 1811 and 1812. She was sunk in 1814 but retrieved in 1815; her final disposition is currently unknown.
