= Lisbon Station =

- Active: 1779–1782, 1795-1841
- Country: United Kingdom
- Branch: Royal Navy
- Type: Fleet
- Role: Convoy Protection, Evacuation.
- Part of: Royal Navy
- Garrison/HQ: Lisbon
- Battle honours: Battle of Porto Praya, Battle of Saldanha Bay, Battle of Corunna

Commanders
- Notable commanders: Commodore George Johnstone, Admiral William H. Gage

The Lisbon station also known as Lisbon Station and Coast of Spain was a formation of the British Navy operating off the coast of Portugal from 1779 to 1782 before being disbanded and then again from 1783 until 1841.

== History ==
The Lisbon station can be traced to the mobile squadron of the Royal Navy operating mainly off the coast of Portugal but also Spain during the late 18th century and 19th century. The squadron was involved in a number of engagements during the Anglo-Spanish War including the action of 11 November 1779. It was particularity known for its involvement in the Battle of Porto Praya in April 1781 as part of the Anglo-French War of 1778–1783. Later that same year, the squadron was ordered to capture the Dutch Cape Colony on the Cape of Good Hope. This led to the Battle of Saldanha Bay in which a number of Dutch ships were seized. The Dutch colony however was not taken. Because of this, the squadron was disbanded in 1782 when Commodore Johnstone sought election as an MP. The Station was re-established in 1795 under the command of Vice-Admiral Sir George Vandeput to undertake convoy duties between England the Mediterranean and Lisbon. Vandeput carried out this duty for about a year. He died in 1800.

In 1808 Vice-Admiral Sir Charles Cotton was charged with preparation of Lisbon harbor for the planned invasion of the Iberian Peninsula later in the year. The fleet was also involved with the evacuation of Sir John Moore's army stuck in Galicia following the Battle of Corunna. In 1810, Admiral Cotton was relieved of command by Admiral Sir George Cranfield Berkeley when it was next involved in improving coastal defences until 1812, when Admiral Berkeley retired his command. He was then replaced by Vice-Admiral Sir George Martin who commanded the station until 1814. He was followed by Rear-Admiral Sir George H. Parker from 1815 until 1834. In early 1837, the station was under the temporary command of Rear-Admiral John Ommanney, until he was relieved as commander in chief by Vice-Admiral Sir William Hall Gage. Gage was ordered, by the Admiralty, to undertake protection duties of Queen Maria II during the period known as the Liberal Wars, fought between progressive constitutionalists and authoritarian absolutists in Portugal over royal succession. The station ceased to be a command in 1841.

== Commander-in-Chief on the Lisbon station ==
- Commodore George Johnstone, 1779-1782

Station not active 1783-1794

- Vice-Admiral Sir George Vandeput, 1796
- Rear-Admiral Sidney Smith, 1807
- Admiral Sir Charles Cotton, 1807–1808

== Commander-in-Chief, Portugal ==
- Admiral George Cranfield Berkeley, 1808-1812

== Commander-in-Chief on the Lisbon Station ==
- Vice-Admiral Sir George Martin, 1812–1814
- Rear-Admiral William Parker, 1831–1834
- Vice-Admiral Sir William Hall Gage, 1834–1837
- Rear-Admiral Sir John Ommanney, 1837–1840
