= Northbrook =

Northbrook may refer to:

== Places ==
=== Settlements ===
- Northbrook, Illinois, United States
- Northbrook, Ohio, United States
- Northbrook, Oxfordshire, a hamlet near the village of, and within the parish of, Kirtlington, Oxfordshire, United Kingdom
- Northbrook, Wiltshire, a hamlet near the village of, and within the parish of, Market Lavington, Wiltshire, United Kingdom
- Northbrook, Hampshire, a place near Micheldever, Hampshire, United Kingdom
- Northbrook (electoral division), a West Sussex County Council constituency, United Kingdom
- Northbrook, Ontario, a place in Addington Highlands, Ontario Canada
- Northbrook, Frederickton, Newfoundland and Labrador a place near Frederickton, Newfoundland and Labrador, Canada

=== Northbrook Park ===
- Northbrook Park, Hampshire, a historic house and grounds built in 1810, now a wedding venue in Bramley, Hampshire, United Kingdom
- Northbrook Park, London, a 9-acre public park in Grove Park, London Borough of Lewisham, United Kingdom, opened in 1903
- Northbrook Park, Devon, a park, estate and former golf course in Exeter, Devon, United Kingdom
- Northbrook Park District, a district and organisation founded in 1927 which manages parks and recreation in Northbrook, Illinois, United States

=== Education ===
- Northbrook High School a high School in Spring Branch, Houston, Texas, United States
- Northbrook Metropolitan College a former higher education college with campuses in Worthing and Shoreham-by-Sea, West Sussex, United Kingdom
- Northbrooks Secondary School, a co-educational government secondary school in Yishun, Singapore

=== Other ===
- Northbrook Island, Russia
- Northbrook (river), a river, in Exeter, Devon, United Kingdom, tributary of the River Exe
- Northbrook station, a railway station in Northbrook, Illinois, United States
- Northbrook Court, a shopping mall in Northbrook, Illinois, United States

== Other uses ==
- Baron Northbrook, several people
- The Virgin and Child (The Northbrook Madonna)
- Northbrook Technology, now Allstate Northern Ireland, a Northern Irish technology company

== See also ==
- North Brook, Rutland, England
