= Nassau (1819 ship) =

UK merchant ship (1819–1825)

History

United Kingdom
- Name: Nassau
- Namesake: Nassau, Bahamas
- Owner: Pirie & Co.
- Launched: 1819, Gosport
- Fate: Wrecked 31 August 1825

General characteristics
- Tons burthen: 205, or 208, or 228, or 250, or 259 (bm)
- Sail plan: Snow
- Notes: Two masts

Nassau was launched at Gosport in 1819. In 1824 a pirate plundered her, and then let her proceed. She was wrecked in August 1825 as she was on her way back to London from a voyage to New South Wales.

== Career ==
Nassau first appeared in Lloyd's Register (LR), in 1820. Nassau first appeared in the Register of Shipping (RS), in 1821.

Year	Master	Owner	Trade	Source & notes
1821	J.Corbyn	J. Pirie & Co.	London–New Providence	RS; part old timbers
1823	J.Corbyn; G.Cross	J. Pirie & Co.	London–New Providence	LR

In the first half of 1822 Nassau, Corbyn, master, traded back and forth between New Providence and London. On 19 May Nassau, Carss, master, arrived at Gravesend, Kent from New Providence. Nassau, Carss, master, sailed to Bordeaux, and then to Jamaica, St Martha, Jamaica, Campeche, Bordeaux, Cartagena (Colombia), Savanilla, and back to Gravesend.

At the end of 1823 Carss sailed Nassau for Sincapore.

Year	Master	Owner	Trade	Source
1825	Carss	J. Pirie & Co.	London–India	LR

On 9 October 1824 Nassau, Carss, master was at 6°20′N 21°30′W, about 600 miles west of Sierra Leone, when a pirate brig of 18 guns and 150 men stopped her. The pirate robbed Nassau of her stores and part of her cargo. Nassau was on her way back to London from Sincapore and she arrived at the Downs on 11 November. She had left Sincapore on 19 June, the Cape on 4 September, and St Helena on 30 September.

On 24 December 1824, Nassau, Carss, master, sailed from Gravesend for New South Wales. On 15 March 1825 she arrived at the Cape and on 18 March she sailed for New South Wales. She arrived at Sydney on 6 May.

Loss: Nassau sailed from Sydney on 9 June. On 23 August she had to jettison some cargo after having endured gales. She developed a leak. Captain Carse beached her on 30 August on the west side of Tristan da Cunha to prevent her sinking; she was wrecked the next day. The crew were able to reach shore via a hawser that two men had taken ashore via her longboat, which was wrecked when she had reached the shore. All on board survived.

After 14 days on shore, four men from the crew walked to a settlement on the north-east end of the island. There were four men in the settlement and they permitted the crew to borrow some boats to retrieve the rest of Nassau'ss crew.

On 3 December 1825 the East Indiaman Fairlie rescued Captain Carse, one passenger, and eleven crew from the island. Two crew members elected to remain.
