= William Dowell (Royal Navy officer) =

Royal Navy Admiral (1825–1912)

Admiral Sir William Dowell GCB
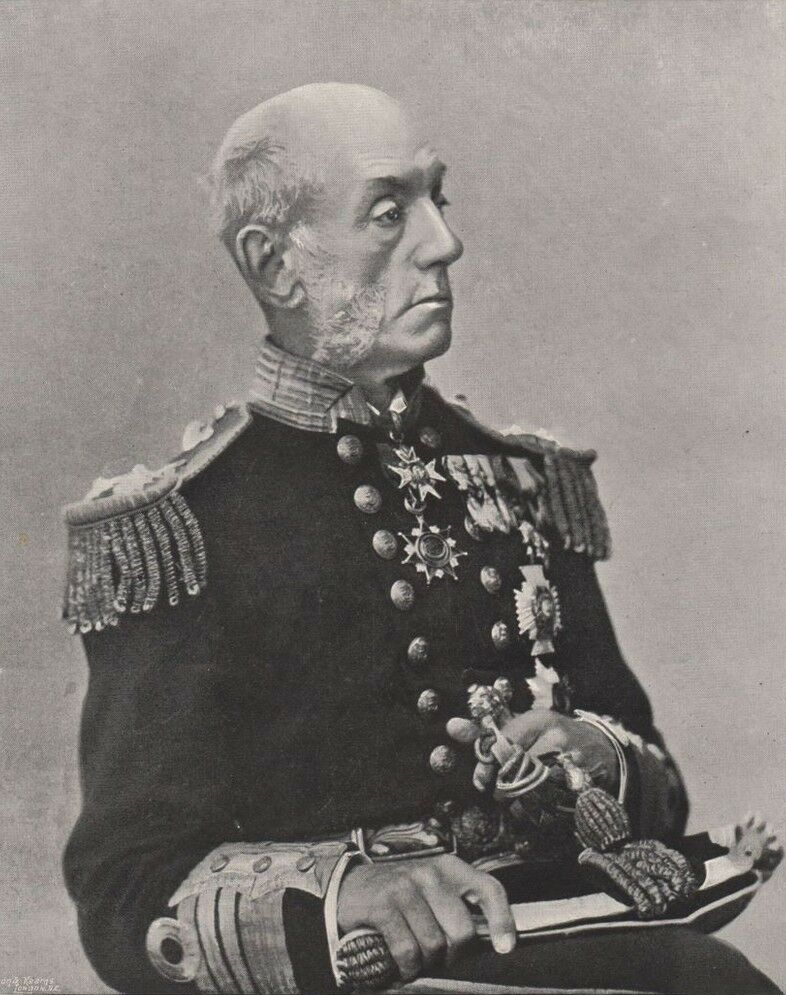
- Born: 2 August 1825
- Died: 27 December 1912 (aged 87); Bideford, Devon
- Military career
- Allegiance: United Kingdom
- Branch: Royal Navy
- Service years: 1839 – 1890
- Rank: Admiral
- Commands: HMS Hornet; HMS Barrosa; HMS Euryalus; HMS Topaze; HMS Leander; Cape of Good Hope Station; HMS Hercules; Coast of Ireland Station; Channel Squadron; China Station; Devonport Station
- Conflicts: Crimean War; Bombardment of Shimonoseki
- Awards: Knight Grand Cross of the Order of the Bath

Admiral Sir William Montagu Dowell GCB (2 August 1825 – 27 December 1912) was a Royal Navy officer who served as Commander-in-Chief, Devonport.

== Naval career ==
Dowell joined the Royal Navy in 1839. He served in the Black Sea during the Crimean War. He was given command of HMS Hornet and HMS Barrosa and, in the latter ship, took part in the Bombardment of Shimonoseki in 1863. Later he commanded HMS Euryalus, HMS Topaze and then HMS Leander. He was made Commander-in-Chief, Cape of Good Hope and West Coast of Africa Station in 1867 before taking command of HMS Hercules in 1871.

He became Second-in-Command of the Channel Squadron in 1877, Senior Officer, Coast of Ireland Station in 1878, Senior Officer in Command of the Channel Squadron in 1882, Commander-in-Chief, China Station in 1884 and Commander-in-Chief, Devonport in 1888. He retired in 1890.

In retirement he became President of the Royal British Female Orphan Asylum in Plymouth.

== Family ==
In 1855 he married Caroline Johnna Pike.

Military offices
Preceded by Sir Charles Hillyar	Commander-in-Chief, Cape of Good Hope Station; 1867–1871	Succeeded by Sir John Commerell
Preceded by Henry Hillyar	Senior Officer, Coast of Ireland Station; 1878–1880	Succeeded by Richard Hamilton
Preceded by Lord Hood	Senior Officer in Command of the Channel Squadron; 1882–1883	Succeeded by The Duke of Edinburgh
Preceded by Sir George Willes	Commander-in-Chief, China Station; 1884–1885	Succeeded by Sir Richard Hamilton
Preceded by Lord John Hay	Commander-in-Chief, Plymouth; 1888–1890	Succeeded by The Duke of Edinburgh
