= John West (Royal Navy officer) =

Royal Navy Admiral of the Fleet (1774–1862)

Admiral of the Fleet Sir John West GCB
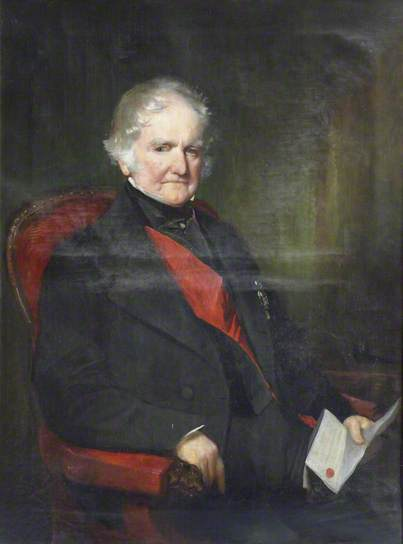
- Sir John West
- Born: 28 July 1774; Twickenham, Middlesex
- Died: 18 April 1862 (aged 87); Eaton Square, London
- Burial place: St John's Church, West Wickham
- Military career
- Allegiance: United Kingdom
- Branch: Royal Navy
- Service years: 1788–1848
- Rank: Admiral of the Fleet
- Commands: HMS Diligence; HMS Tourterelle; HMS Utrecht; HMS Excellent; HMS Sultan; Plymouth Command
- Conflicts: French Revolutionary Wars; Napoleonic Wars
- Awards: Knight Grand Cross of the Order of the Bath

Admiral of the Fleet Sir John West GCB (28 July 1774 – 18 April 1862) was a Royal Navy officer. West saw action as a junior officer in the first-rate HMS Royal George, the flagship of Admiral Sir Alexander Hood in the Channel Squadron, when he took part in the Glorious First of June and then in the Battle of Groix during the French Revolutionary Wars.

As commanding officer of the third-rate HMS Excellent, West served off the coast of Catalonia and landed with a naval brigade with orders to help defend Rosas which was under attack from some 5,000 French troops in an action during the Napoleonic Wars. He took 250 of his ship's men and rescued a group migueletes (Catalan mercenaries) who were at risk of losing their lives, but not before having his own horse shot out from under him.

As a senior officer, West went on to be Commander-in-Chief, Plymouth.

== Early career ==
Born the son of Lieutenant Colonel Temple West and Jane West (née Drake), West joined the Royal Navy in June 1788. He was appointed to the sixth-rate HMS Pomona in the West Africa Squadron and then transferred to the fourth-rate HMS Salisbury, flagship of the North America Station, and then, having been promoted to midshipman, to the second-rate HMS London, flagship of the Channel Squadron. He joined the fifth-rate HMS Hebe in the Channel Squadron in July 1790 and then transferred to the fourth-rate HMS Romney in the Mediterranean Fleet in February 1793 before moving to the first-rate HMS Royal George in the Channel Squadron a few months later. Promoted to lieutenant on 27 July 1793, he transferred to the third-rate HMS Saturn at Portsmouth in November 1793 before rejoining HMS Royal George, by then the flagship of Admiral Sir Alexander Hood in the Channel Squadron. In HMS Royal George he took part in the Glorious First of June, when the French fleet lost seven ships, in June 1794, and then in the Battle of Groix, when three French ships were captured, in June 1795, during the French Revolutionary Wars.

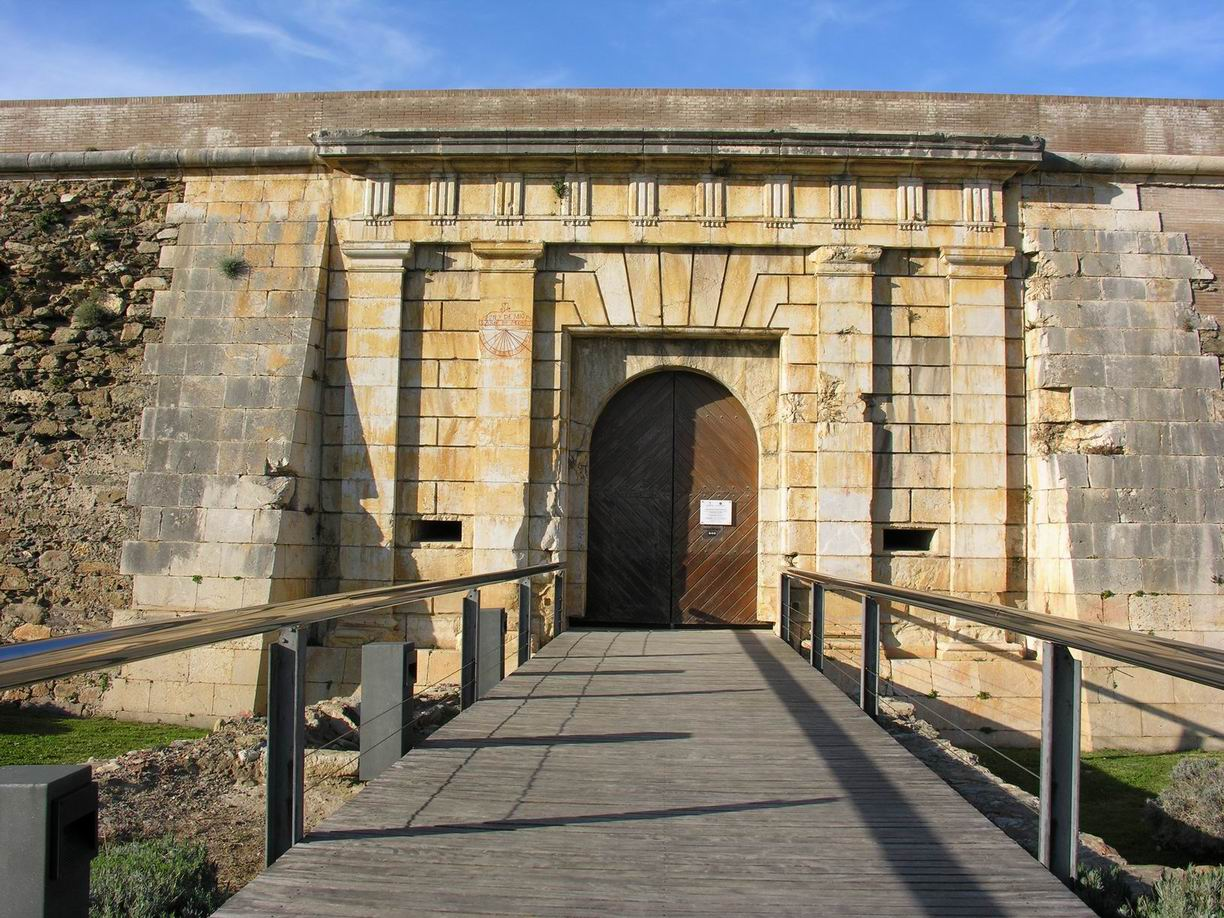
The citadel of Rosas, where West rescued a group migueletes (Catalan mercenaries) in November 1808

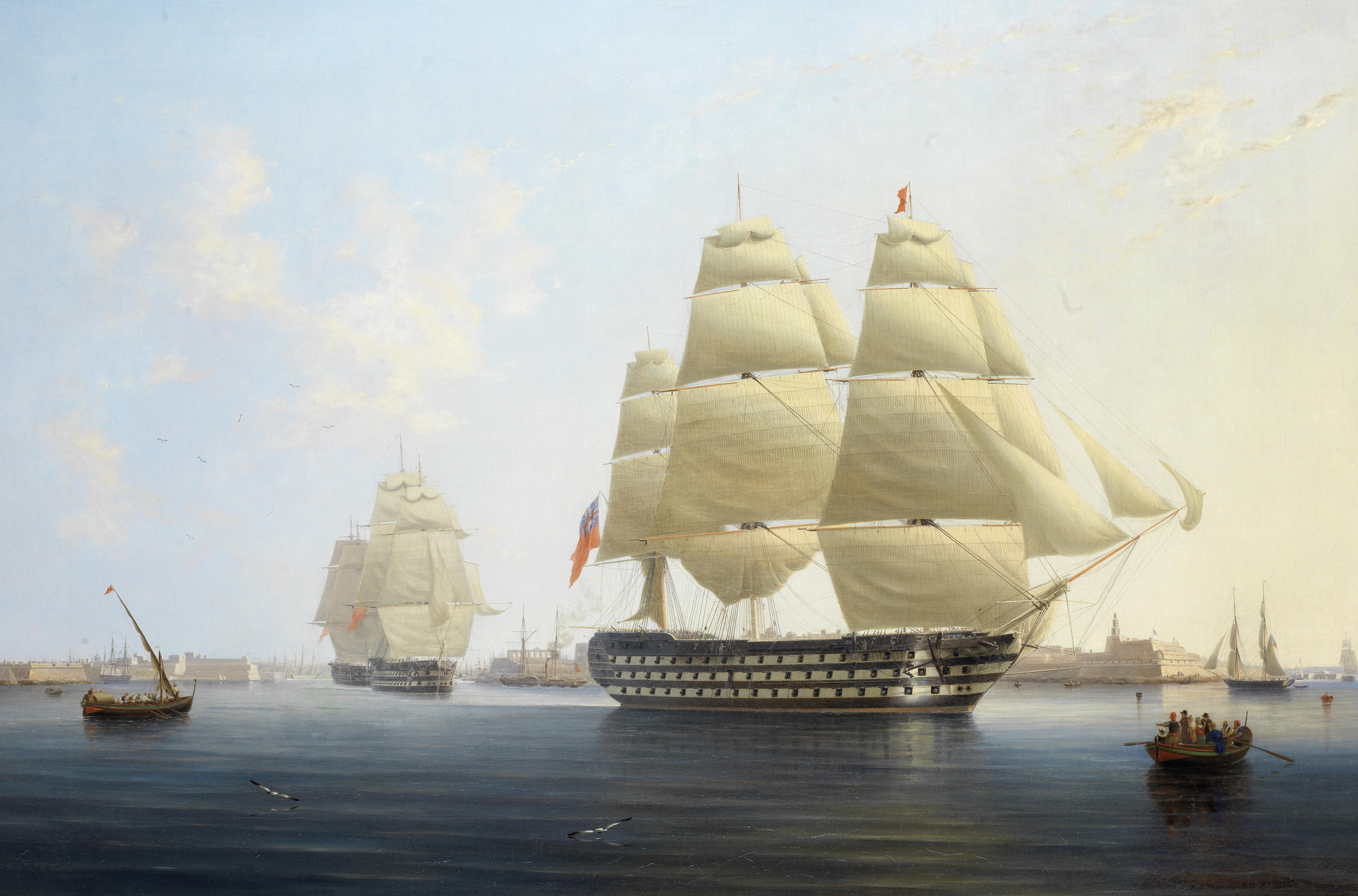
The first-rate HMS Queen, West's flagship as Commander-in-Chief, Plymouth

Promoted to commander on 7 September 1795, West became commanding officer of the sloop HMS Diligence on the West Indies Station in December 1795. He was promoted to captain on 15 November 1796 and went on to be commanding officer of the sixth-rate HMS Tourterelle also on the West Indies Station. He became commanding officer of the third-rate HMS Utrecht at Chatham in March 1801 and commanding officer of the third-rate HMS Excellent in January 1807. In HMS Excellent he served off the coast of Catalonia and landed with a naval brigade with orders to help defend Rosas which was under attack from some 5,000 French troops in an action in November 1808 during the Napoleonic Wars. He took 250 of his ship's men and rescued a group migueletes (Catalan mercenaries) who were are risk of losing their lives, but not before having his own horse shot out from under him.

West returned to HMS Excellent and served at the blockade of Toulon before moving on to be commanding officer of the third-rate HMS Sultan in the Mediterranean Fleet in December 1809. In HMS Sultan he continued to serve on the Home Station and in the West Indies until March 1814.

== Senior command ==
Despite not undertaking an active service, West was promoted to rear admiral on 12 August 1819 and to vice admiral on 22 July 1830 and appointed a Knight Commander of the Order of the Bath on 4 July 1840. However, after being promoted to full admiral on 23 November 1841, he was appointed Commander-in-Chief, Plymouth, with his flag in the first-rate HMS Queen, in April 1845.

West was promoted to Admiral of the Fleet on 25 June 1858 and advanced to Knight Grand Cross of the Order of the Bath on 18 May 1860. He died at his home in Eaton Square in London on 18 April 1862 and was buried and commemorated by a table tomb at St John's Church at West Wickham in Bromley.

== In popular culture ==
In a 1965 episode of the second television season of Danger Man titled, Parallel Lines Sometimes Meet, Patrick McGoohan playing secret agent John Drake uses the alias John West (as at 21:40) and at the end of the episode, a Russian secret agent says to Drake, "Is it not true that you were named after a famous English admiral?", to which he assents. Admiral John West's mother's maiden name was Drake.

== Family ==
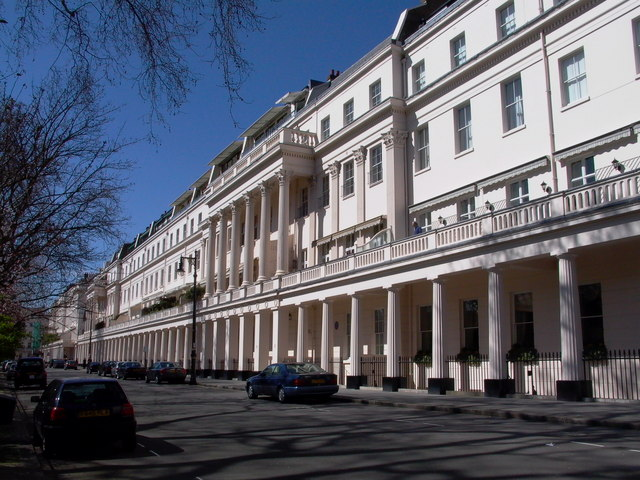
Eaton Square in London: West lived at No. 99

West married Harriett Adams in May 1817 and they had three sons and two daughters. These included, his heir Lieutenant Colonel Sir John Temple West of Ryde, Captain Alexander George West, RN. and Major Frederick West.

== See also ==
- O'Byrne, William Richard (1849). "West, John" . A Naval Biographical Dictionary . John Murray – via Wikisource.

== Sources ==
- O’Byrne, William R. (1849). A Naval Biographical Dictionary - Volume 3. Naval and Military Press. ISBN 9781781502815.
- Heathcote, Tony (2002). The British Admirals of the Fleet 1734 – 1995. Pen & Sword. ISBN 0-85052-835-6.

Military offices
Preceded by Sir David Milne	Commander-in-Chief, Plymouth; 1845–1848	Succeeded by Sir William Gage
