= Indispensable (1791 ship) =

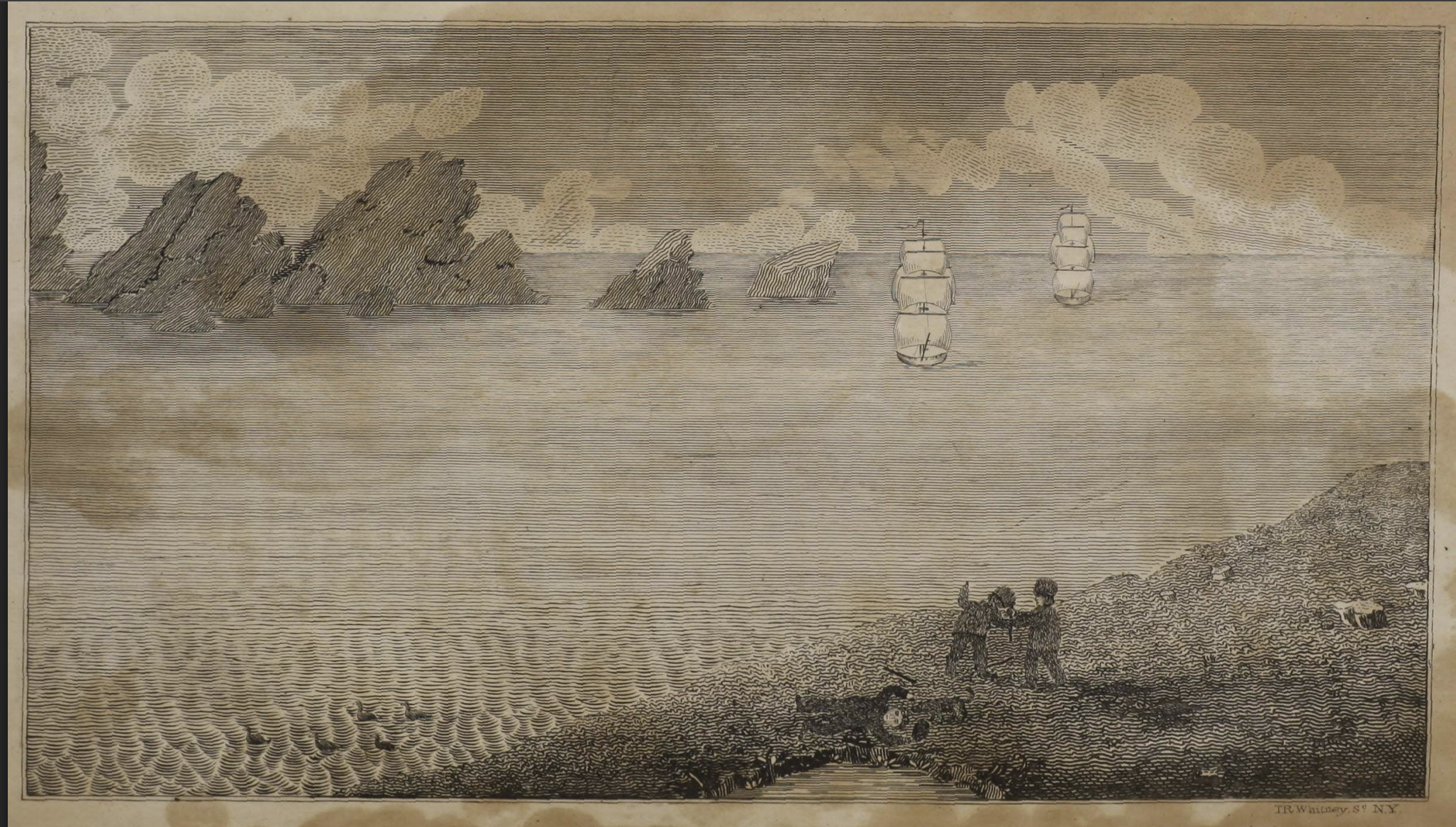
- Arrival of the ships Asp and Indispensable (right) at New Island (November 1814, engraving by the sketch of castaway captain C. H. Barnard)

History

France
- Name: Indispensable
- Builder: Bordeaux
- Launched: 1791
- Captured: Early 1793

Great Britain
- Name: Indispensable
- Owner: Daniel Bennett (1793-1827)
- Acquired: 11 May 1793
- Fate: 26 April 1830, Register cancelled as demolition was complete

General characteristics
- Tons burthen: 350, or 351, or 35140/94, or 362 (bm)
- Length: 106 ft 3 in (32.4 m)
- Beam: 28 ft 9 in (8.8 m)
- Propulsion: Sail
- Complement: 1793: 20; 1800: 32; 1804: 35; 1806: 25
- Armament: 1793: 8 × 6-pounder guns + 1 × 4-pounder coehorn, + 4 swivel guns; 1799: 12 × 6-pounder + 2 × 4-pounder guns, + 2 × 18-pounder carronades; 1800: 16 × 6-, 9-, & 18-pounder guns; 1804: 16 × 6-pounder guns; 1806: 12 × 6-pounder guns

Indispensable was a sailing ship built in France and launched in 1791. She was captured in 1793 at the outbreak of the French Revolutionary Wars and thus came into British hands, keeping her name (occasionally reported as Indispensable). She performed two voyages for the British East India Company (EIC) between 1793 and 1797. During this period and later she made two voyages transporting convicts to New South Wales. Amongst her notable events were the discovery of Indispensable Strait (1794), the capture of a Spanish vessel (1798), and the rescue of some castaways (1814). She later went on serve as a whaler in the South Seas until autumn 1827. She ceased trading after this last voyage and was broken up by April 1830.

== French career and capture ==
Indispensable was launched in 1791 as a West Indiaman. In 1793 she was on her way to the West Indies under the command of Arnaud Florence when the Guernsey privateer Tartar, Peter Le Lacheur, master, captured her. She was condemned on 11 May 1793. On 19 October 1793, she was at Guernsey with P. LeLievre, master. Not long thereafter, Daniel Bennett purchased her.

== British career ==
On 8 December 1793 William Wilkinson received a letter of marque. This authorised Indispensable to capture enemy vessels should the opportunity arise.

She sailed to Port Jackson on 17 December 1793, arriving on 14 May 1794. She departed for Bengal on 7 July 1794, in company with the American vessel Halcyon, Captain Benjamin Page. On this voyage, Wilkinson discovered a strait between the Florida Islands and Guadalcanal to the southwest, and Malaita to the northeast, that he named the Indispensable Strait. (Note: Findlay's Directory gives the year of discovery as 1790, but this date is in error.) Indispensable may have left for Bengal, but she arrived at Whampoa, China. There the EIC engaged Indispensable for a voyage back to Britain. Wilkinson left Whampoa on 24 January 1795, reached St Helena on 14 April, and arrived at the Downs on 23 July.

On her first convict voyage under the command of William Wilkinson, Indispensable sailed from England on 5 November 1795. She stopped at Rio de Janeiro in January to replenish her water, and arrived at Port Jackson on 30 April 1796. She transported 133 female convicts, two of whom died on the voyage.

Indispensable then left Port Jackson bound for China. The EIC again engaged her for a voyage back to Britain. She left Whampoa on 7 January 1797, reached the Cape on 3 April and St Helena on 29 April, and arrived at the Downs on 25 July.

Indispensable, still under Wilkinson's command, with 14 guns and a crew of 32, was waiting to sail in October 1797. She arrived at Rio Janeiro in December, requiring "calefaction", i.e., caulking. She left on 20 January 1798. She then captured the Spanish ship La Union of 12 guns and 32 men about 35 leagues (170 km) southwest of Cape Horn on 19 February 1798 and conveyed her prize to the Cape of Good Hope. Union was carrying tallow, hides and herb tea, and her estimated value was £10,000. She had been travelling from Montevideo to Lima.

While sailing south of Van Diemen's Land, Indispensable lost two boats and one man overboard in a storm that also stove in two boats and carried away several spars.

In late September 1798 Indispensable left to do some whaling and returned on 27 October 1798, and left again shortly afterwards on a second whaling voyage before returning on 29 December 1798 with 54 tons of sperm whale oil from whaling within a range of 125 miles (201 km) above and below Sydney, and within 90 miles (140 km) of the coast. Indispensable then underwent a refit and repair while in Port Jackson. Indispensable undertook numerous whaling voyages before returning to England in October 1800, and sailed to Sydney for careening and refit in 1797–98.

On 24 December 1800 Calvin Gardner (or Gardiner) was captain of Indispensable, and received a letter of marque (applicable to a person, not a vessel). She sailed in February 1801. In August 1801 Indispensable was reported to be at Walwich Bay, together with numerous other whalers. She returned to Britain in February 1802.

She sailed for the fisheries later that year. At the time she was valued at £6,500. In September 1802 she was reported to again be at Walwich Bay with several other whalers, including Ferret. She returned to Britain in November 1803.

In December 1803 the vessel, spelt Indispensible in Lloyd's List, was at Cork. After the outbreak of the Napoleonic Wars, Gardner received a second letter of marque on 10 February 1804. He then sailed Indispensible to south seas in March. She was at Rio in May 1804 for water and re-provisioning, and was reported "all well" of the Peruvian coast in November. She remained in the fisheries in 1805, and returned to Britain in January 1806.

Robert Turnbull received a letter of marque on 20 March 1806, Indispensible was also mentioned in the Protection List for that year. (Note: The Protection List listed vessels whose crews were exempt from naval service, i.e., impressment.) She sailed to the whale fishery in May. The whaler Indispensable was reported to have been well at New Zeeland [sic] in April 1807, and July, and whaling off the River Derwent. She returned to London in September 1808.

On her second convict voyage to Australia, under Henry Best, she sailed from England on 2 March 1809. (Note: It is not clear whether she sailed under a letter of marque or not. One comprehensive listing of letters source does not list one. Another source states that she did. She was on the Protection List.) She arrived at Port Jackson on 18 August. On this voyage Indispensable transported 62 female convicts, one of whom died on the voyage. Indispensable left Port Jackson for whaling, returning on 18 September with a cargo of oil and leaving on 16 October for more whaling.

The whaler Indispensable, Captain Best, was reported leaving New South Wales (Port Jackson), in mid-September 1811. She was sailing to New Zealand to complete her cargo and would then return to Britain directly; she arrived in July 1812, with 175 tons of sperm oil.

Indispensible sailed for the South Seas whale fishery in December 1812 under the command of William Buckle. She was reported well at Lima in May 1813, and at "Tombas" in December. (Note: Tombas appears to be Punta Tombo, in Argentina.) She returned to Britain, arriving on 31 May 1814 at Deal with several Indiamen (including Baring, Charles Mills, and Fairlie), and another whaler, all under escort by HMS Cornwallis.

In 1813 the EIC had lost its monopoly on the trade between India and Britain. British ships were then free to sail to India or the Indian Ocean under a licence from the EIC. Indispensable's owners applied for a licence on 9 August 1814 to trade or whale in the East Indies; they received it on 15 August.

Indispensable sailed again on 23 July. In December 1814 Indispensable and Asp, John Kenny, master, rescued Charles H. Barnard, the former master of Nanina, and four others, two from Isabella. Barnard had rescued the crew of Isabella in April 1813, only to have them take over his ship and leave him and the four men stranded on New Island. Indispensible returned on 2 May 1816.

Captain Peter Kemp sailed Indispensible in 1816. She returned on 14 May 1817.

On 19 June 1817 Kemp sailed for South Georgia. He returned on 7 April 1818 with 500 casks of whale oil.

Captain George Brown sailed Indispensible from Britain on 17 May 1818, again with destination South Georgia. She was reported to have been there on 3 February 1819. Also there were Ann, Dowell, master, Grand Sachem, Littlejohn, master, Arab, Barclay, master, and Mary Ann, Todrig, master. Indispensable returned to Britain on 25 May 1819 with 260 casks of whale oil and 385 seal skins.

Brown and Indispensible sailed again on 28 June 1819. She was reported to have been towards the Cape of Good Hope on 22 August, later at South Georgia with 22 tuns of whale oil. She returned to Britain on 16 March 1821 with 300 casks of whale oil and 736 seal skins.

Brown and Indispensible left Britain on 18 July 1821. She was reported to have been on the coast of Peru by 30 August, and at Honolulu on 30 March 1823. At some point William Tolley Brooks replaced Brown as master. She returned to Britain on 29 April 1824 with 600 casks of whale oil.

Captain Fenton left Britain on 6 July 1824. Indispensible was at Madeira on 24 July, bound for the South Seas. By 9 January 1825 she was off the coast of Peru with 400 barrels of sperm oil. In March she had 510 barrels, but the crew was suffering from scurvy. She was at Woahu on 7 July 1826. She was on 7 September 1827 to have been at St Helena. On 13 September 1827, Captain Fenton brought Indispensable into Dover from the South Seas. She arrived at London on 21 September.

== Fate ==
Indispensable's registration was cancelled on 26 April 1830, after she had been broken up.

=== Lloyd's Register ===
Indispensable appears in Lloyd's Register in 1806 with C. Gardner as master, Bennett as owner, and trade as London and South Seas Fisheries. That entry remains unchanged through 1811, though other evidence indicates that the actual master changed. The last entry is for 1826, by which time Indispensable was 37 years old. Her owner from 1799 to 1826 was Bennett & Co., who also had purchased from private owners in 1824 the former Cruizer-class brig-sloop HMS Eclipse, and then employed her too in the South Seas fisheries.

Year	Master	Owner	Trade	Notes
1812	C. Gardner	Bennett & Co.	London & South Seas	
1813	C. Gardner	Bennett & Co.	London & South Seas	
1814	Buckle?	Bennett & Co.	London & South Seas	Entry in Supplement
1815	Buckle	Bennett & Co.	London & South Seas	
1816	Buckle; Kemp	Bennett & Co.	London & South Seas	
1817				Not published
1818	Kemp	Bennett & Co.	London & South Seas	
1819	J. Brown	Bennett & Co.	London & South Seas	
1820	J. Brown	Bennett & Co.	London & South Seas	
1821	J. Brown	Bennett & Co.	London & South Seas	
1822	J. Brown	Bennett & Co.	London & South Seas	
1823	J. Brown	Bennett & Co.	London & South Seas	
1824	J. Brown; replaced by Fenton	Bennett & Co.	London & South Seas	
1825	Fenton	Bennett & Co.	London & South Seas	
1826	Fenton	Bennett & Co.	London & South Seas	
1827				No entry

The last entry for Indispensable in the Register of Shipping was in 1827 and it had the same information as the entry for 1826 in Lloyd's Register.

== Fate ==
Indispensable was finally broken up on 26 April 1830.

== Bibliography ==
- Bateson, Charles (1959). The Convict Ships. Brown, Son & Ferguson. OCLC 3778075.
- Clayton, J. M. (2014). Ships employed in the South Sea Whale Fishery from Britain: 1775-1815: An alphabetical list of ships. Jane M. Clayton. ISBN 978-1-908-61652-4.
- Findlay, Alexander George (1877). A Directory for the Navigation of the South Pacific Ocean: With Descriptions of Its Coasts, Islands, Etc., from the Strait of Magalhaens to Panama, and Those of New Zealand, Australia, Etc., Its Winds, Currents, and Passages. R. H. Laurie.
- Hackman, Rowan (2001). Ships of the East India Company. Gravesend, Kent: World Ship Society. ISBN 0-905-61796-7.
- Headland, R. K. (1989). Chronological List of Antarctic Expeditions and Related Historical Events. Cambridge University Press. ISBN 978-0-521-30903-5.
- House of Commons, Parliament, Great Britain (1816). Parliamentary Papers. Vol. 10.
- Jamieson, Alan G. (1986). A People of the sea: the maritime history of the Channel Islands. Methuen. ISBN 978-0-416-40540-8.
- O'Hara (1818). The History of New South Wales. J. Hatchard.
- Sarre, John W. (2007). Howell, Alan (ed.). Guernsey sailing ships, 1786–1936. Vol. 8. Guernsey Museum monograph series.
- Stanbury, Myra; Henderson, Kandy-Jane; Derrien, Bernard; Bigourdan, Nicolas; Le Touze, Evelyne (2015). "Chapter 18: Epilogue". In Stanbury, Myra (ed.). The Mermaid Atoll Shipwreck: A Mysterious Early 19th-century Loss. Fremantle, WA: Australian National Centre of Excellence for Maritime Archaeology and the Australasian Institute for Maritime Archaeology. pp. 235–290. ISBN 978-1-876-46509-4.
