= HMS Wildfire =

Five ships and a number of shore establishments of the British Royal Navy have borne the name HMS Wildfire:

== Ships ==
- HMS Wildfire (1804) was a fireship, previously the civilian vessel John, built 1766. She was purchased in 1804 and sold in 1807.
- HMS Wildfire (1826) was a wood paddle packet, previously the GPO ship Watersprite. She was launched in 1826, transferred to the Navy in 1837 and was sold in 1888.
- HMS Wildfire (1888) was a screw yacht tender purchased in 1888. She was used as a base ship from 1889 and was renamed HMS Undine in 1907. She was sold in 1912.

== Shore establishments ==
- HMS Wildfire (1889 shore establishment) was a shore establishment established at Sheerness in 1889. It closed in 1933 but re-opened in 1937. It was paid off in 1950. A number of ships were renamed HMS Wildfire whilst serving as base and depot ships for the establishment:
  - HMS Wildfire (1888) was the original base ship from 1889 until 1907.
  - HMS Nymphe was HMS Wildfire from 1906 until 1916.
  - HMS Cornwallis was HMS Wildfire between 1916 and 1957.
- HMS Wildfire (1964 shore establishment) was a communications training establishment and Royal Naval Reserve headquarters in Chatham (Gillingham) commissioned in 1964 and paid off in 1993.
- HMS Wildfire (2000 shore establishment) is a Maritime Reserves (Royal Navy) unit located in Northwood. It was previously named HMS Northwood but was renamed HMS Wildfire in 2000.

Other shore establishments have been commissioned as tenders and subordinate bases to the main HMS Wildfires, and have shared the name, with an identifying numeral:

- HMS Wildfire II was an accounting base at Sheerness between 1939 and 1940.
- HMS Wildfire III was an accounting base at Sheerness in 1940.
- HMS Wildfire III was the commanding officer's base and a tender to HMS Wildfire between 1942 and 1946.
