= William Gage (Royal Navy officer) =

Royal Navy Admiral of the Fleet (1777–1864)

Admiral of the Fleet Sir William Gage GCB GCH
- Born: 2 October 1777; St James's, London
- Died: 4 January 1864 (aged 86); Thurston, Suffolk
- Burial place: St Peter's Churchyard, Thurston, Suffolk
- Military career
- Allegiance: Great Britain; United Kingdom
- Branch: Royal Navy
- Service years: 1789–1851
- Rank: Admiral of the Fleet
- Commands: HMS Terpsichore; HMS Uranie; HMS Thetis; HMS Indus; East Indies Station; Downs Station; Lisbon Station; Devonport Station
- Conflicts: French Revolutionary Wars; Napoleonic Wars
- Awards: Knight Grand Cross of the Order of the Bath; Knight Grand Cross of the Royal Guelphic Order

Admiral of the Fleet Sir William Hall Gage, GCB, GCH (2 October 1777 – 4 January 1864) was Second Sea Lord in the British Navy. He took part in the Battle of Cape St Vincent and the Siege of French-held Malta during the French Revolutionary Wars. He also saw action at the attack on the French ship Romulus during the closing stages of the Napoleonic Wars.

As a senior officer, Gage became Commander-in-Chief, East Indies Station and went on to be Commander-in-Chief of the Downs Station. Following the Belgian Revolution, Gage took part in the blockade of the Scheldt, offering naval support to the new Kingdom of Belgium. He then became Commander-in-Chief in Lisbon Station, with orders to protect the young Queen Maria II during the Liberal Wars. After that, Gage became Second Naval Lord in the Second Peel ministry and then Commander-in-Chief, Devonport.

== Early career ==
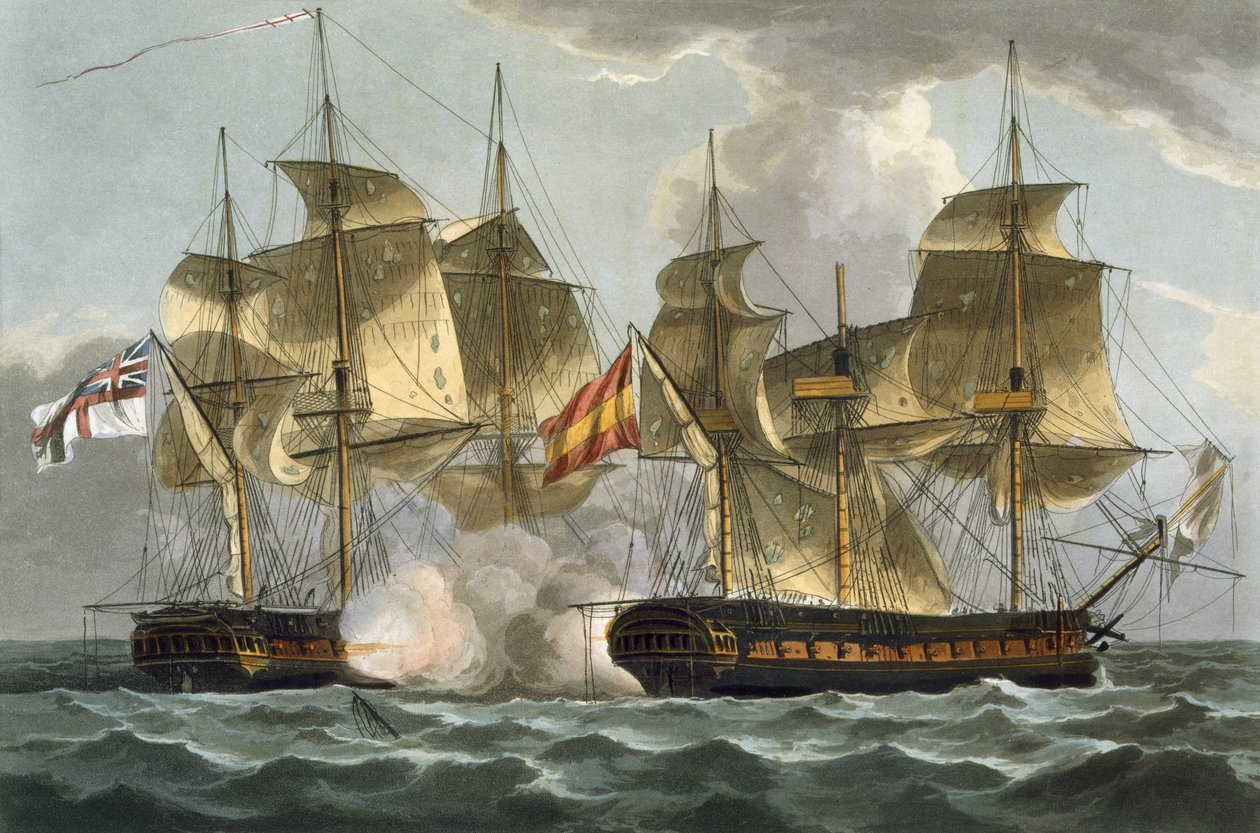
The fifth-rate HMS Terpsichore (on the left) which Gage commanded during the Siege of French-held Malta.

Born the third son of General Thomas Gage and Margaret Kemble, Gage joined the Royal Navy in November 1789. He was appointed to the third-rate HMS Bellona at Portsmouth and, having been promoted to midshipman, transferred to the third-rate HMS Captain in September 1790. He went on to serve in the third-rate HMS Colossus, the sixth-rate HMS Proserpine, the third-rate HMS America, the third-rate HMS Egmont and then the second-rate HMS Princess Royal. In HMS Princess Royal he took part in the Battle of Leghorn in March 1795 and the Battle of Toulon in July 1795 during the French Revolutionary Wars. He then transferred to third-rate HMS Bedford and saw action off Cádiz and then moved to the first-rate HMS Victory, flagship of Sir John Jervis in his role as Commander-in-Chief, Mediterranean Squadron.

Gage's grandfather had been a cousin of Sir William Gage, 7th Baronet who was a noted patron of Sussex cricket in the first half of the 18th century: Gage himself became involved in cricket and is recorded playing in two matches for the Montpelier and Kennington team in 1796 and one in 1802. He had only one innings in that match and scored 15 not out.

Gage transferred to the fifth-rate HMS Minerve in January 1796, and having been promoted to lieutenant on 11 March 1796, he took part in the capture of the Spanish ship Santa Sabina in December 1796. He also took part in the Battle of Cape St Vincent in February 1797 and led the Minerve's boats' crews in company with those of the frigate HMS Lively in the cutting out of the French ship Mutine at Santa Cruz, Tenerife in May 1797. He was promoted to commander on 13 June 1797 and to captain and commanding officer of the fifth-rate HMS Terpsichore on 26 July 1797, the day after her previous captain Richard Bowen and first lieutenant George Thorp were killed during the assault on Santa Cruz, Tenerife. HMS Terpsichore then sailed for Tunis as part of a squadron ordered to take possession of some French vessels following a breach of neutrality committed by its Bey, following which the squadron cruised the Balearic Islands where they made several captures before HMS Terpsichore joined the squadron conducting the Siege of French-held Malta. In HMS Terpsichore he also conveyed Charles Emmanuel, who had just abdicated as Prince of Piedmont, to exile in Sardinia in February 1799 and captured the Spanish ship San Antonio in June 1799. In July 1800 he was involved in an incident in which his squadron stopped and searched a Danish convoy heading for France: the incident led to the formation of the Second League of Armed Neutrality, an alliance between Denmark–Norway, Prussia, Sweden and Russia.

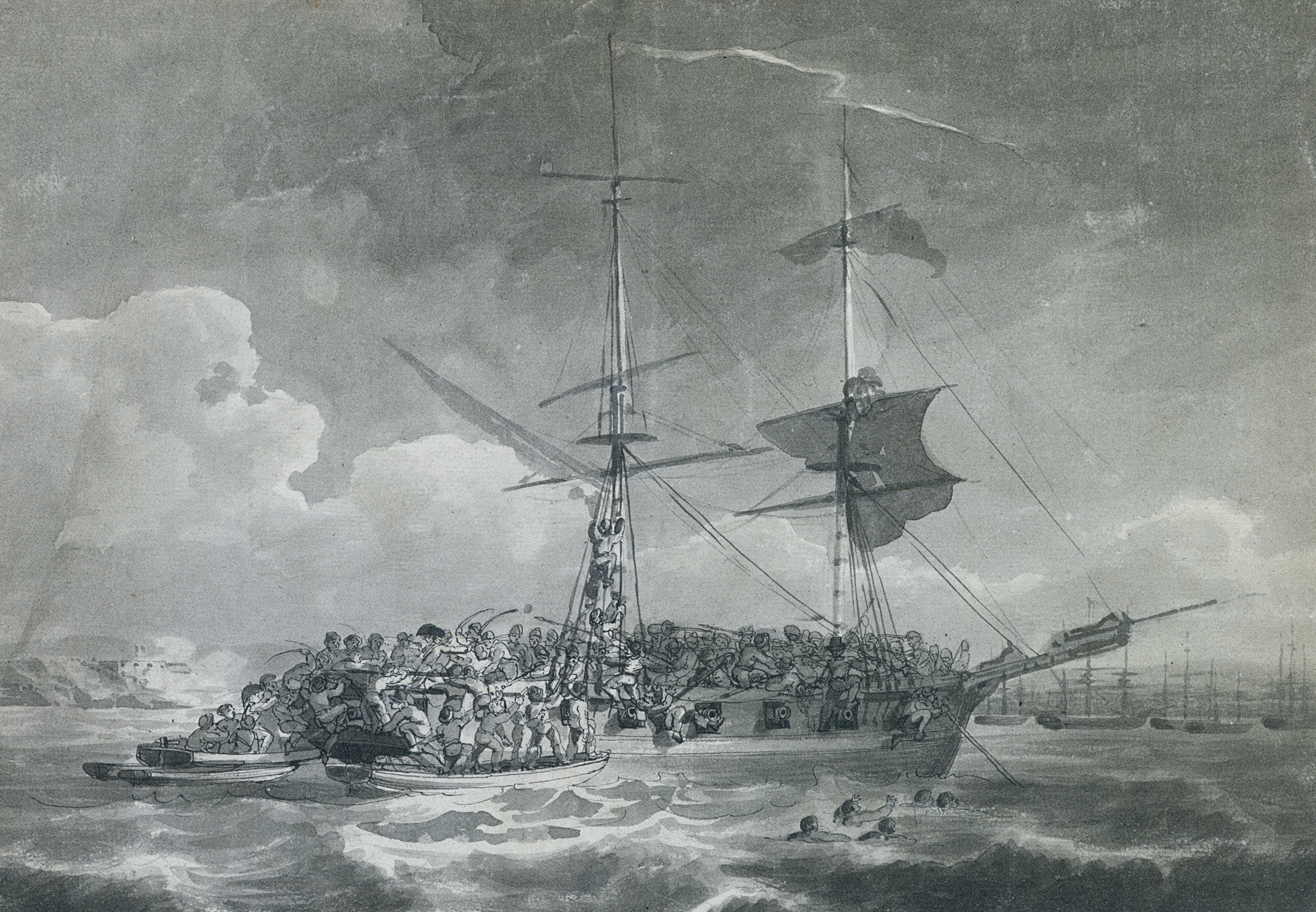
The cutting out of a French brig, possibly La Chevrette

Gage became commanding officer of the fifth-rate HMS Uranie in the Channel Squadron in March 1801 and took part in the capture of the French ship Chevrette in July 1801. He went on to be commanding officer of the fifth-rate HMS Thetis in the Mediterranean Squadron in July 1805 and of the third-rate HMS Indus also in the Mediterranean Squadron in February 1813. In HMS Indus he saw action at the attack on the French ship Romulus in February 1814 during the closing stages of the Napoleonic Wars.

== Senior command ==
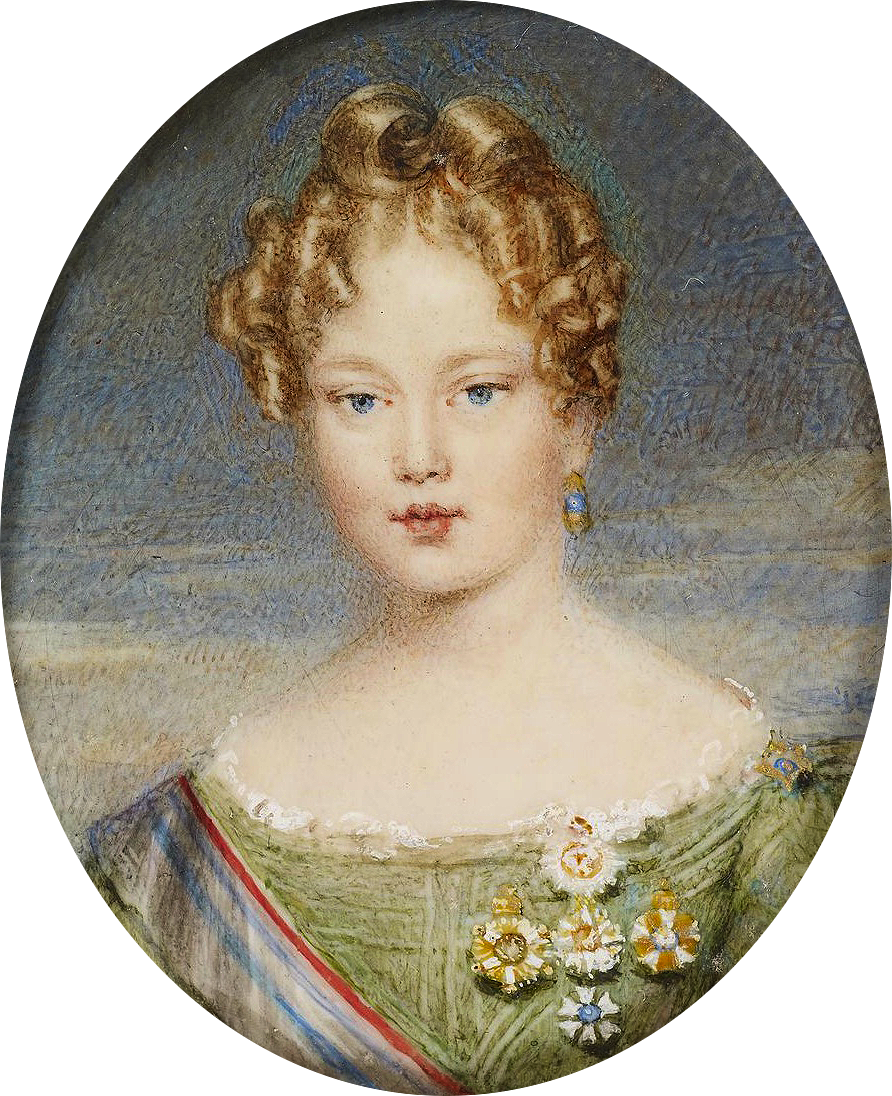
The young Queen Maria II who Gage had orders to protect during the ongoing Liberal Wars in Portugal.

Promoted to rear admiral on 19 July 1821, Gage was appointed Commander-in-Chief, East Indies Station, with his flag in the third-rate HMS Warspite, in December 1825. He went on to be Commander-in-Chief, the Downs in 1833 and, following the Belgian Revolution, took part in the blockade of the Scheldt that summer offering naval support to the newly established Kingdom of Belgium. He was appointed Knight Grand Cross of the Royal Guelphic Order on 19 April 1834. Promoted to vice-admiral on 10 January 1837, he became Commander-in-Chief of the Lisbon Station, with his flag in the third-rate HMS Hastings, in April 1837 with orders to protect the young Queen Maria II during the ongoing Liberal Wars in Portugal. He went on to be Second Naval Lord in the Second Peel ministry in September 1841 and remained in that post until the Government fell in July 1846.

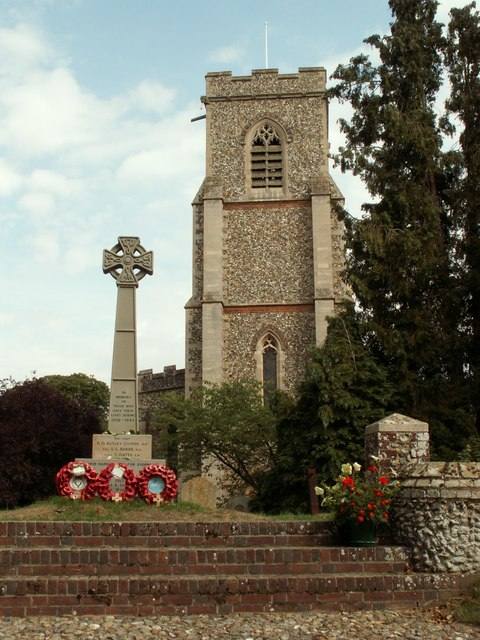
St Peter's Churchyard in Thurston where Gage was buried

Promoted to full admiral on 9 November 1846, Gage became Commander-in-Chief, Devonport, with his flag in the first-rate HMS San Josef, in 1848 and in that role he had to contain an outbreak of cholera on the United States ship American Eagle passing through Plymouth Sound in June 1849. He was appointed Rear-Admiral of the United Kingdom on 24 October 1853 and Vice-Admiral of the United Kingdom on 6 November 1854 and then appointed a Knight Grand Cross of the Order of the Bath on 18 May 1860, before being promoted to Admiral of the Fleet on 20 May 1862. He died at his home, Thurston Cottage, in Thurston, Suffolk on 4 January 1864 and was buried at St Peter's Churchyard in Thurston.

Cape Gage, a rocky promontory at the eastern edge of Ross Island near Antarctica, was discovered by Sir James Clark Ross and named after him. Gage Street, a short one way commercial street in Central, Hong Kong, and Gage Roads, the sea channel in the Indian Ocean offshore from Fremantle, Western Australia, were also named after him.

== Family ==
Gage never married or had any children.

== See also ==
- O'Byrne, William Richard (1849). A Naval Biographical Dictionary . John Murray – via Wikisource.

== Sources ==
- Heathcote, Tony (2002). The British Admirals of the Fleet 1734 – 1995. Pen & Sword. ISBN 0-85052-835-6.
- Murray, Ian; Hercock, Marion (2008). Where on the Coast is That?. Hesperian Press. ISBN 978-0-85905-452-2.
- Marshall, John (1823). "Fanshaw, Henry" . Royal Naval Biography. Vol. 1, part 2. London: Longman and Company. pp. 836–840.

Military offices
Preceded by James Brisbane	Commander-in-Chief, East Indies Station; 1825–1829	Succeeded by Sir Edward Owen
Preceded by Sir Edward Troubridge	Second Naval Lord; 1841–1846	Succeeded by Sir James Dundas
Preceded by Sir John West	Commander-in-Chief, Plymouth; 1848–1851	Succeeded by Sir John Ommanney
Honorary titles
Preceded by Sir George Cockburn	Rear-Admiral of the United Kingdom; 1853–1854	Succeeded by The Earl of Dundonald
Preceded by Sir Thomas Byam Martin	Vice-Admiral of the United Kingdom; 1854–1862	Succeeded by Sir Graham Eden Hamond
