= HMS Cornwallis (1813) =

Vengeur-class ship of the line

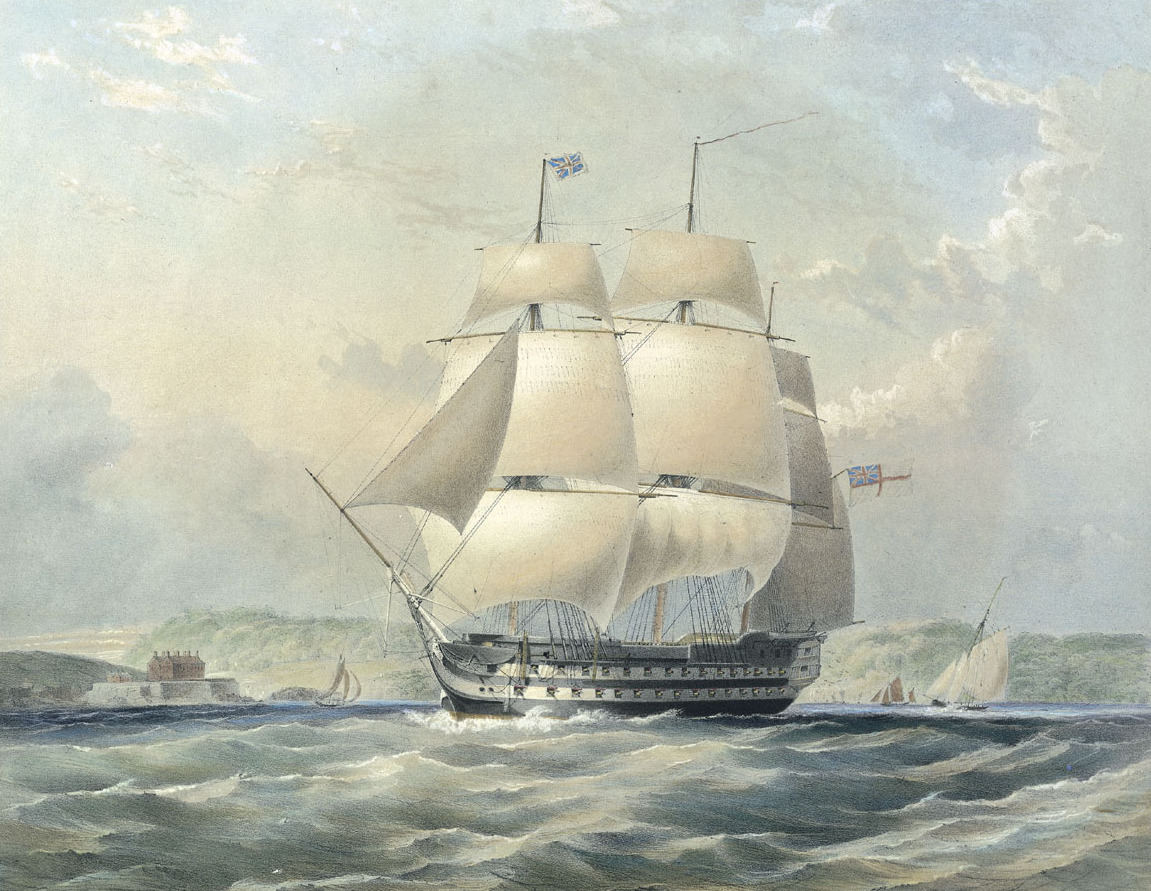
- 1847 illustration of Cornwallis leaving Plymouth Harbour

History

United Kingdom
- Name: Cornwallis
- Ordered: 25 July 1810
- Builder: Jamsetjee Bomanjee Wadia, Bombay Dockyard
- Laid down: 1812
- Launched: 12 May 1813
- Commissioned: December 1814
- Renamed: Wildfire, March 1916
- Fate: Broken up, 1957

General characteristics (as built)
- Class & type: Vengeur-class ship of the line
- Tons burthen: 1,809 28/94 (bm)
- Length: 177 ft 5 in (54.1 m) (gundeck)
- Beam: 48 ft 5 in (14.8 m)
- Depth of hold: 21 ft 2 in (6.5 m)
- Sail plan: Full-rigged ship
- Complement: 590
- Armament: 74 muzzle-loading, smoothbore guns; Gundeck: 28 × 32 pdr guns; Upper deck: 28 × 18 pdr guns; Quarterdeck: 4 × 12 pdr guns + 10 × 32 pdr carronades; Forecastle: 2 × 12 pdr guns + 2 × 32 pdr carronades

HMS Cornwallis was a 74-gun third rate Vengeur-class ship of the line built for the Royal Navy in the first decade of the 19th century. Completed in 1814, she played a minor role in the Napoleonic Wars. She was built of teak in Bombay. The capture of Java by USS Constitution delayed the completion of Cornwallis as Java had been bringing her copper sheathing from England.

Cornwallis arrived at Deal, Kent on 31 May 1814, having escorted several East Indiamen (including Baring, Charles Mills, and Fairlie), and two whalers (including Indispensable).

On 27 April 1815, Cornwallis engaged the American sloop USS Hornet (1805), which had mistaken Cornwallis for a merchant ship. Heavily outgunned, Hornet was forced to retreat. The crew threw boats, guns and other equipment overboard in order to escape.

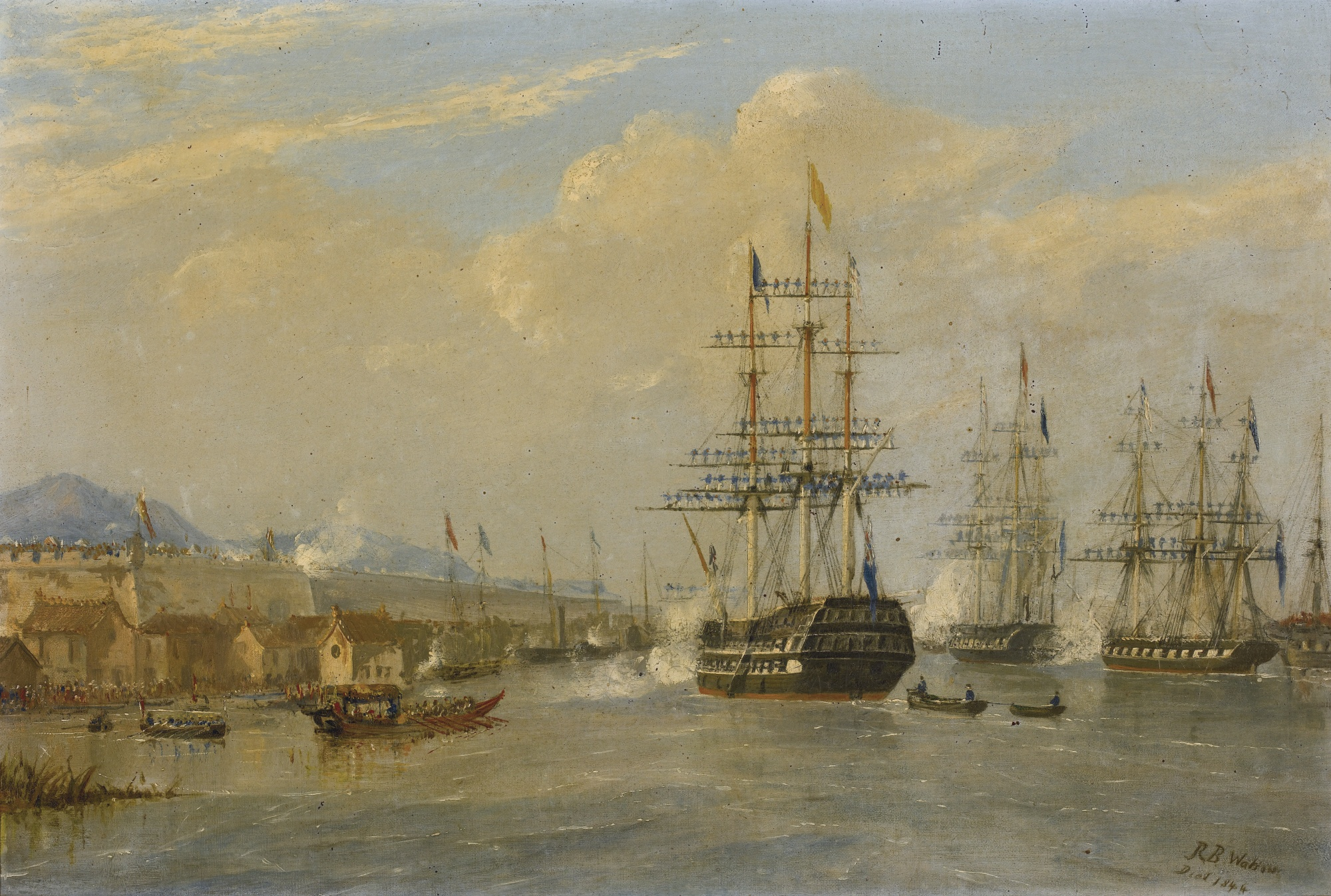
Cornwallis and the British squadron in Nanking

After China's defeat in the First Opium War, representatives from the British and Qing Empires negotiated a peace treaty aboard Cornwallis in Nanjing. On 29 August 1842, British representative Sir Henry Pottinger and Qing representatives, Qiying, Yilibu and Niujian, signed the Treaty of Nanking aboard her.

Cornwallis was fitted with screw propulsion and reduced to 60 guns in 1855, and took part in the Crimean War, where she was commanded by George Wellesley, future admiral and First Sea Lord, and the nephew of the Duke of Wellington.

She was converted to a jetty at Sheerness in 1865. In 1916, she was renamed HMS Wildfire and used as a base ship. She was finally broken up in 1957 at Sheerness, some 144 years after her launching.

== Bibliography ==
- Colledge, J. J.; Warlow, Ben & Bush, Steve (2020). Ships of the Royal Navy: The Complete Record of all Fighting Ships of the Royal Navy from the 15th Century to the Present (5th revised and updated ed.). Seaforth Publishing. ISBN 978-1-5267-9327-0.
- James, William (1837). The Naval History of Great Britain, from the Declaration of War by France in 1793, to the Accession of George IV. R. Bentley.
- Lambert, Andrew D. (1984). Battleships in Transition: The Creation of the Steam Battlefleet 1815-1860. Conway Maritime Press. ISBN 0-85177-315-X.
- Lambert, Andrew D. (1991). The Last Sailing Battlefleet: Maintaining Naval Mastery 1815 - 1850. Conway Maritime Press. ISBN 0-85177-591-8.
- Lavery, Brian (1984). The Ship of the Line. Vol. 1: The Development of the Battlefleet 1650-1850. Naval Institute Press. ISBN 0-85177-252-8.
- Parkinson, C. Northcote (1954). War in the Eastern Seas, 1793-1815. George Allen & Unwin. p. 421.
- Winfield, Rif (2008) [2005]. British Warships in the Age of Sail 1793–1817: Design, Construction, Careers and Fates (2nd, revised ed.). Seaforth. ISBN 978-1-84415-717-4.
- Winfield, Rif (2014). British Warships in the Age of Sail 1817–1863: Design, Construction, Careers and Fates. Seaforth Publishing. ISBN 978-1-84832-169-4.
