= Charles Mills (1810 ship) =

United Kingdom-flagged ocean trade ship (1810–1822)

History

United Kingdom
- Name: Charles Mills
- Owner: Charles John Wheeler; H. Christopher; J. Jackson
- Builder: Carson, Forbes, Courtney & Co., Chester
- Launched: December 1810
- Fate: Foundered 20 May 1822

General characteristics
- Tons burthen: 559, or 563, or 56335/94, or 580 (bm)
- Length: Overall: 123 ft 4 in (37.6 m); Keel:98 ft 9 1/4 in (30.1 m)
- Beam: 32 ft 9 in (10.0 m)
- Depth of hold: 13 ft 7 in (4.1 m)
- Propulsion: Sail
- Complement: 50
- Armament: 4 × 9-pounder guns + 10 × 18-pounder carronades
- Notes: Two decks

Charles Mills was launched at Chester in 1810. She made two voyages for the British East India Company (EIC). She then traded between London and India under a license from the EIC. She foundered on 20 May 1822 with the loss of most of the people on board.

== Career ==
Captain George Raincock received a letter of marque on 11 May 1811. The EIC had her measured and then chartered her for two voyages.

Raincock sailed from Torbay on 30 May 1811, bound for Bombay. Charles Mills reached Madeira on 30 June with a number of other India-bound vessels. Their escort, Theban, and another East Indiaman arrived the next day. They were expected to resume their voyages at the end of June. They actually sailed on 2 July. Charles Mills arrived at Bombay on 25 October. Homeward bound, she reached St Helena on 23 February 1812, and arrived at the Downs on 10 May.

Raincock sailed from Portsmouth on 2 June 1813, bound for Bombay. Charles Mills reached Madeira on 21 June, and arrived at Bombay on 24 October. Homeward bound, she was at Point de Galle on 12 January 1814 and the Cape of Good Hope on 1 March. She reached St Helena on 18 March, and Deal on 31 May with several vessels (including Baring and Fairlie), and two whalers (including Indispensable), all under escort by HMS Cornwallis. Charles Mills arrived at Long Reach on 1 June.

In 1813, the British East India Company (EIC) had lost its monopoly on the trade between India and Britain. British ships were then free to sail to India or the Indian Ocean under a licence from the EIC. Charles Mill's owners applied for a licence to sail to the East Indies. They applied on 23 November 1814, and received the licence on 10 December.

Listings of departures in Lloyd's Register for India of ships licensed by the EIC provide the following information:

Date	Master	Where bound	Owner
17 May 1815	M. O'Brien	Bengal	H. Christopher
5 April 1817	H. Christopher	Fort William, India	H. Christopher
2 June 1818	J. Jackson	Bengal	J. Jackson
4 April 1820	J. Jackson	Bombay	J. Jackson

== Fate ==
Charles Mills, sailing from Bengal, left the pilot on 11 May 1822. A storm came up on 17 May and she foundered on 20 May at 15°00′N 85°30′E in the Bay of Bengal, about 370 miles ENE of Madras. Sixty-six persons drowned; the seven survivors were at sea in a small boat for five days before they approached land. While the surf prevented them from landing, the French brig Scythe, which was sailing from Mauritius to Calcutta, came upon them and rescued them. The survivors included Captain Wise, Mr. Roberts (the second officer), and five others. Scythe took them to Kedgeree, where they arrived on 28 May. The entry for Charles Mills in the 1823 Lloyd's Register carried the annotation "lost".

This same storm caught Lady Nugent at 15°N 88°E. She survived after having thrown a third of her cargo overboard. She was so damaged that she had to put back into Bengal.
