= Baring (1809 ship) =

India-built UK merchant ship and transport 1809–1816

History

United Kingdom
- Name: Alexander Brodie
- Owner: Thomas Garland Murray (1811)
- Builder: Cooper, Calcutta
- Launched: 28 February 1805
- Renamed: Baring 1809
- Fate: Lost 1814 & recovered 1815; final disposition currently unknown

General characteristics
- Tons burthen: 650, or 733, or 753, or 7536/94, or 756, or 75641/94, or 761 (bm)
- Length: 138 ft 8 in (42.3 m) (overall); 111 ft 9 1/2 in (34.1 m) (keel)
- Beam: 35 ft 8 in (10.9 m)
- Depth of hold: 16 ft 1 in (4.9 m)
- Propulsion: Sail
- Armament: 14 × 18-pounder carronades
- Notes: Teak-built two-decker

Baring was launched at Calcutta in 1805 as Alexander Brodie. Her owners sold her to Portuguese interests that named her Asia Felix. They in turn sold her to British owners in 1809. The British owners renamed her Baring. She made one voyage for the British East India Company (EIC) between 1811 and 1812.

== Career ==
Baring, Palmer & Co., owners, appeared on a list of vessels registered at Calcutta in January 1811. On 13 December 1810 a Baring arrived at Portsmouth from Bengal, Madras, and the Cape of Good Hope.

EIC voyage Captain Henry Templer sailed from Gravesend on 28 May 1811 and Portsmouth on 27 July, bound for Bengal. Baring reached Madeira on 14 August, and the Cape of Good Hope on 23 October, before arriving at Diamond Harbour on 13 January 1812. London-bound, she was at Saugor on 23 April, reached Madras on 8 July and St Helena 11 September, and arrived at Gravesend on 11 November.

She returned to private trade in India, but then was admitted to the Registry of Great Britain on 24 February 1813. She entered the Registry of Shipping in 1813 with Carter, master, Murray, owner, and trade London transport.

She was then, according to one source, "Employed in the transport service and sold to the Government".

On 31 May 1814 she arrived at Deal with several other Indiamen (including Charles Mills and Fairlie), and two whalers (including Indispensable), all under escort by HMS Cornwallis.

Loss: On 18 October 1814, Lloyd's List reported that "The Baring Transport, Carter, Master" had been lost at Beerhaven on 10 October. She had left Cork the day before with an expedition. The crew, and all the troops, save five men, were saved. The troops consisted of 200 men from the 40th Regiment of Foot. Boats from the escorting vessels, HMS Sultan and HMS Shamrock, effected the rescue. The Register of Shipping for 1815 carried the annotation "Lost" by her name.

Recovery: Lloyd's List reported on 5 December 1815 that "The Baring Transport", which had sunk in October 1814, had been raised, and apparently with little damage.

Lloyd's Register (LR) for 1816 carried Baring with Carter, master, Murray, owner, and trade London transport. She was no longer listed in 1818.

== Bibliography ==
- Grocott, Terence (1997). Shipwrecks of the Revolutionary and Napoleonic Eras. London: Chatham Publishing. ISBN 978-1-861-76030-2.
- Hackman, Rowan (2001). Ships of the East India Company. Gravesend, Kent: World Ship Society. ISBN 978-0-905-61796-1.
- House of Commons, Parliament, Great Britain (1814). Minutes of the Evidence Taken Before the Select Committee on Petitions Relating to East-India-Built Shipping. H.M. Stationery Office.
- Phipps, John (1840). A Collection of Papers Relative to Ship Building in India ... Also a Register Comprehending All the Ships ... Built in India to the Present Time ... Scott Publishing Co.
