= HMS Sultan (1807) =

Ship of the line of the Royal Navy

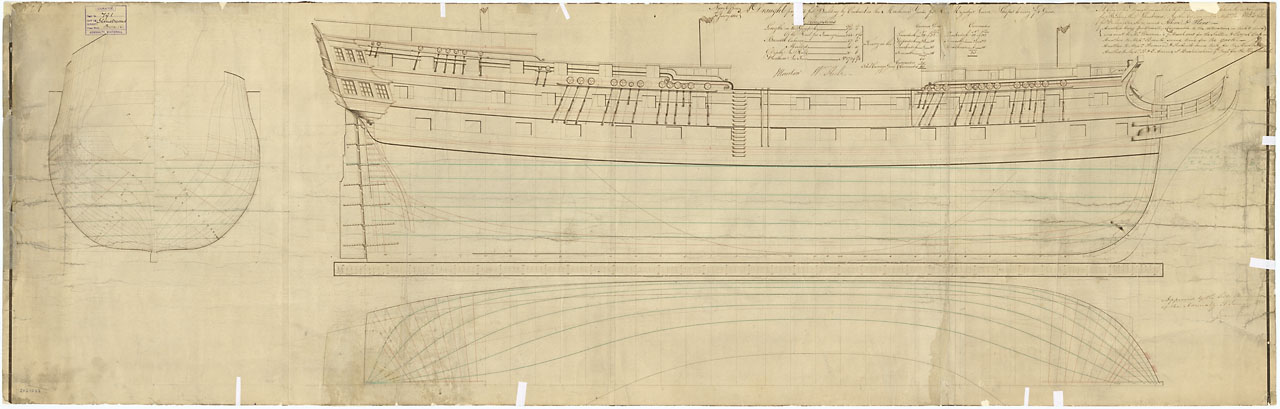
- Sultan

History

United Kingdom
- Name: HMS Sultan
- Ordered: 31 January 1805
- Builder: Dudman, Deptford Wharf
- Laid down: December 1805
- Launched: 19 September 1807
- Fate: Broken up, 1864

General characteristics
- Class & type: Fame-class ship of the line
- Tons burthen: 1751 (bm)
- Length: 175 ft (53.3 m) (gundeck)
- Beam: 47 ft 6 in (14.5 m)
- Depth of hold: 20 ft 6 in (6.2 m)
- Propulsion: Sails
- Sail plan: Full-rigged ship
- Armament: Gundeck: 28 × 32-pounder guns; Upper gundeck: 28 × 18-pounder guns; QD: 4 × 12-pounder guns + 10 × 32-pounder carronades; Fc: 4 × 12-pounder guns + 2 × 32-pounder carronades; Poop deck: 6 × 18-pounder carronades

HMS Sultan was a 74-gun third rate ship of the line of the Royal Navy, launched on 19 September 1807 at Deptford Wharf.

In 1809, she took part in the Battle of Maguelone while captained by Edward Griffith.

On 10 October 1814 Sultan was escorting some transports when Baring wrecked at Beerhaven. Sultan's boats, and those of Shamrock, were able to rescue the crew and all the troops, save five men. The troops consisted of 200 men from the 40th Regiment of Foot.

== Fate ==
Sultan became a receiving ship in 1860, and was broken up in 1864.
