= Northbrook Park, Hampshire =

House in Bramley, Hampshire, England

Coordinates: 51°11′47″N 0°50′41″W

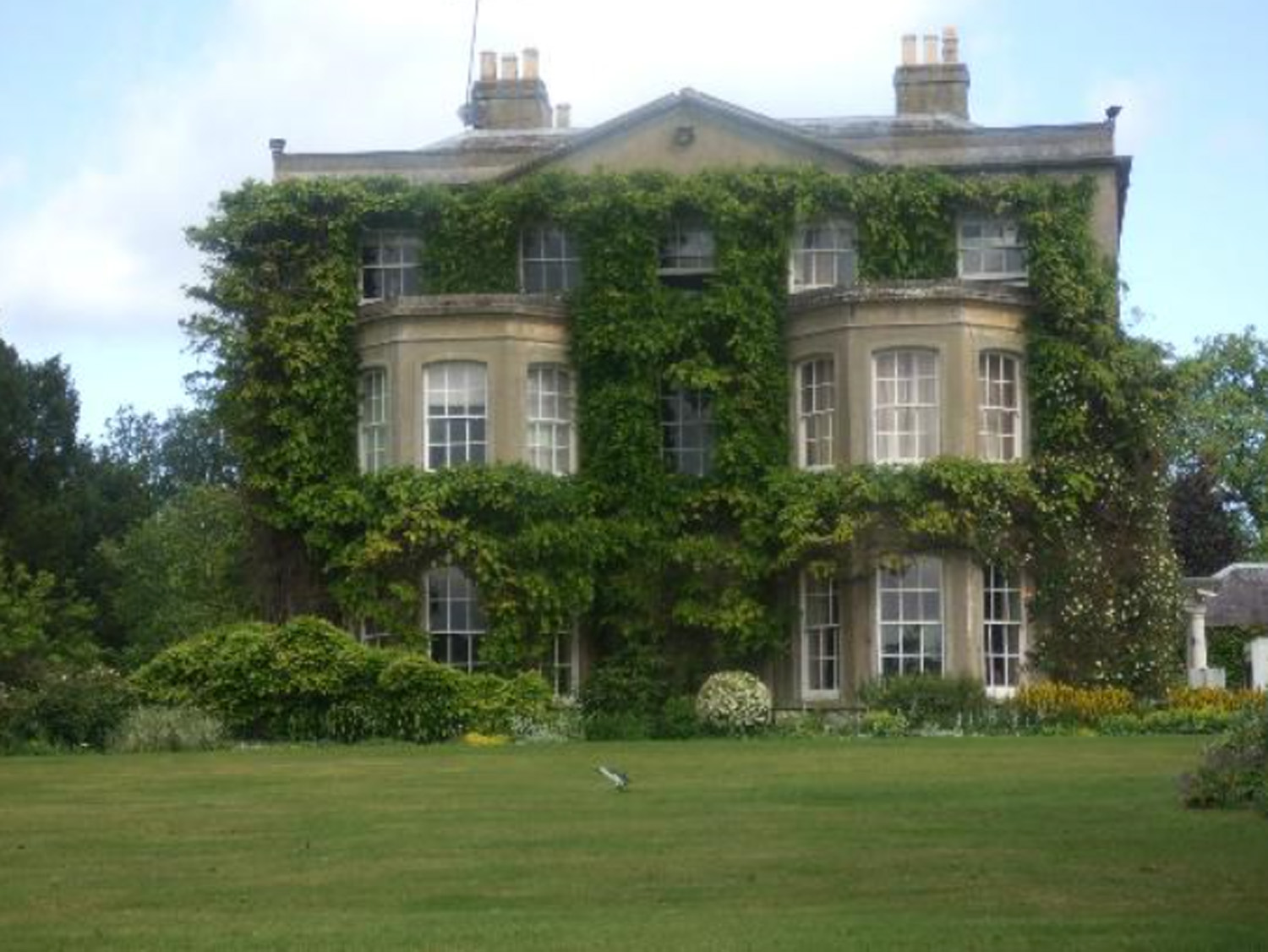
Northbrook Park, Farnham

Northbrook Park is a house in the civil parish of Bramley, in the East Hampshire district, in the county of Hampshire, England. It is a Grade II listed building. It is a Georgian house built in about 1810 for Admiral Sir John Acworth Ommanney. Later it was the home of John Frederick Schroder, the founder in England of the present financial company Schroders. Today it is a wedding venue.
