= Fairlie (1810 ship) =

British East India Company ship

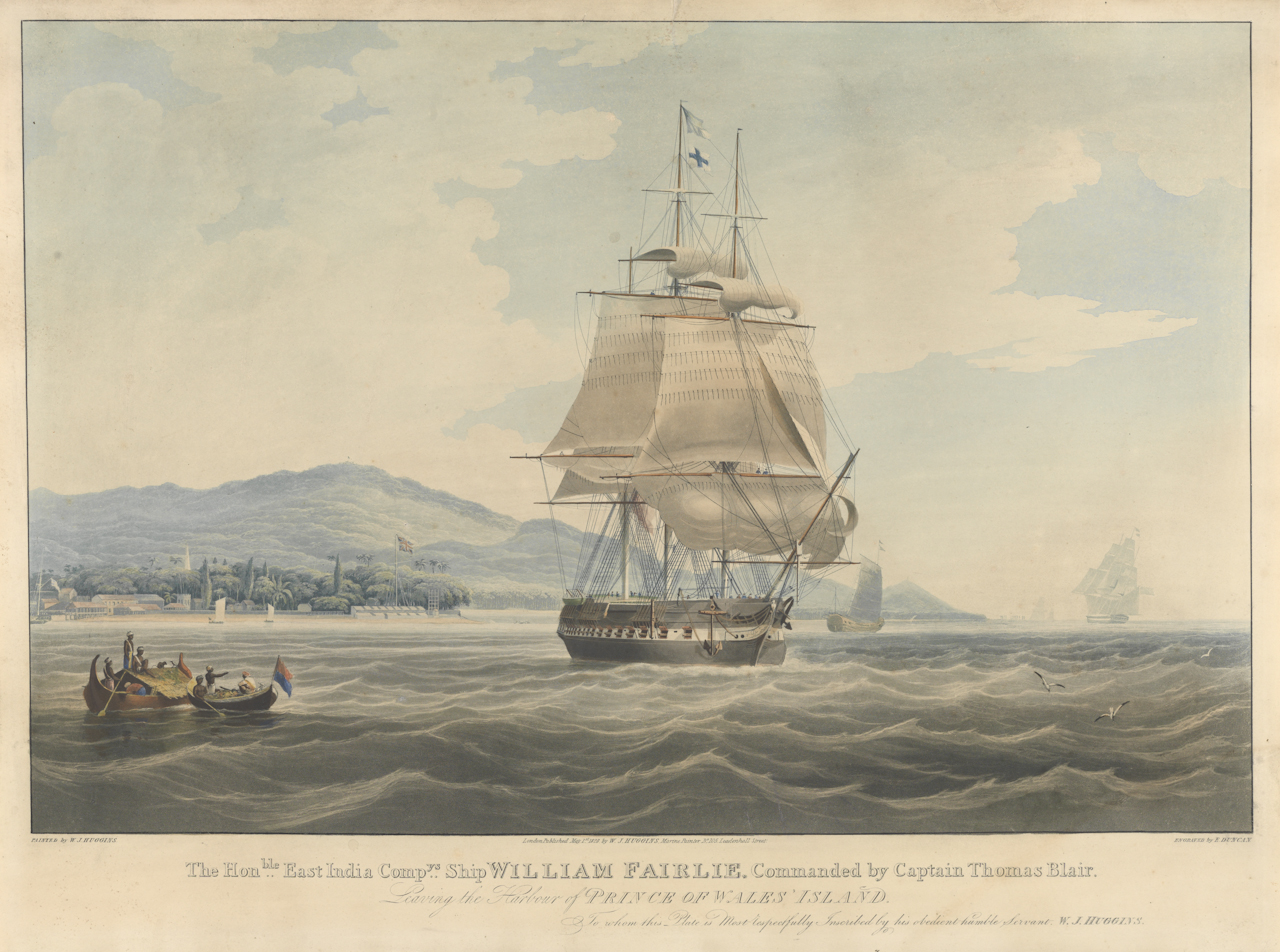
- The William Fairlie leaving Prince of Wales Island

History

United Kingdom
- Name: Fairlie
- Owner: EIC voyages 1&2:John Biddulph; EIC voyages 3&4: David Gordon; 1843:
- Builder: J.Gilmore, Calcutta
- Launched: 1810
- Fate: Foundered November 1865

General characteristics
- Tons burthen: 690, 692, or 698, or 69886/94, or 755, or 756 (bm)
- Length: Overall: 132 ft 5 in (40.4 m); Keel:106 ft 0 in (32.3 m)
- Beam: 35 ft 2 1/2 in (10.7 m)
- Depth of hold: 17 ft 1 in (5.2 m)
- Propulsion: Sail
- Complement: 80
- Armament: 20 × 18-pounder guns
- Notes: Two decks

Fairlie was launched at Calcutta in 1810 and sailed to England. There she became a regular ship for the British East India Company (EIC). Including her voyage to England, she made four voyages for the EIC. From around 1821 on she became a Free Trader, continuing to trade with India under a license from the EIC. She also made two voyages transporting convicts to New South Wales (1834), and Tasmania (1852). She made several voyages carrying immigrants to South Australia, New South Wales, and British Guiana. Fairlie foundered in November 1865.

== EIC voyages ==
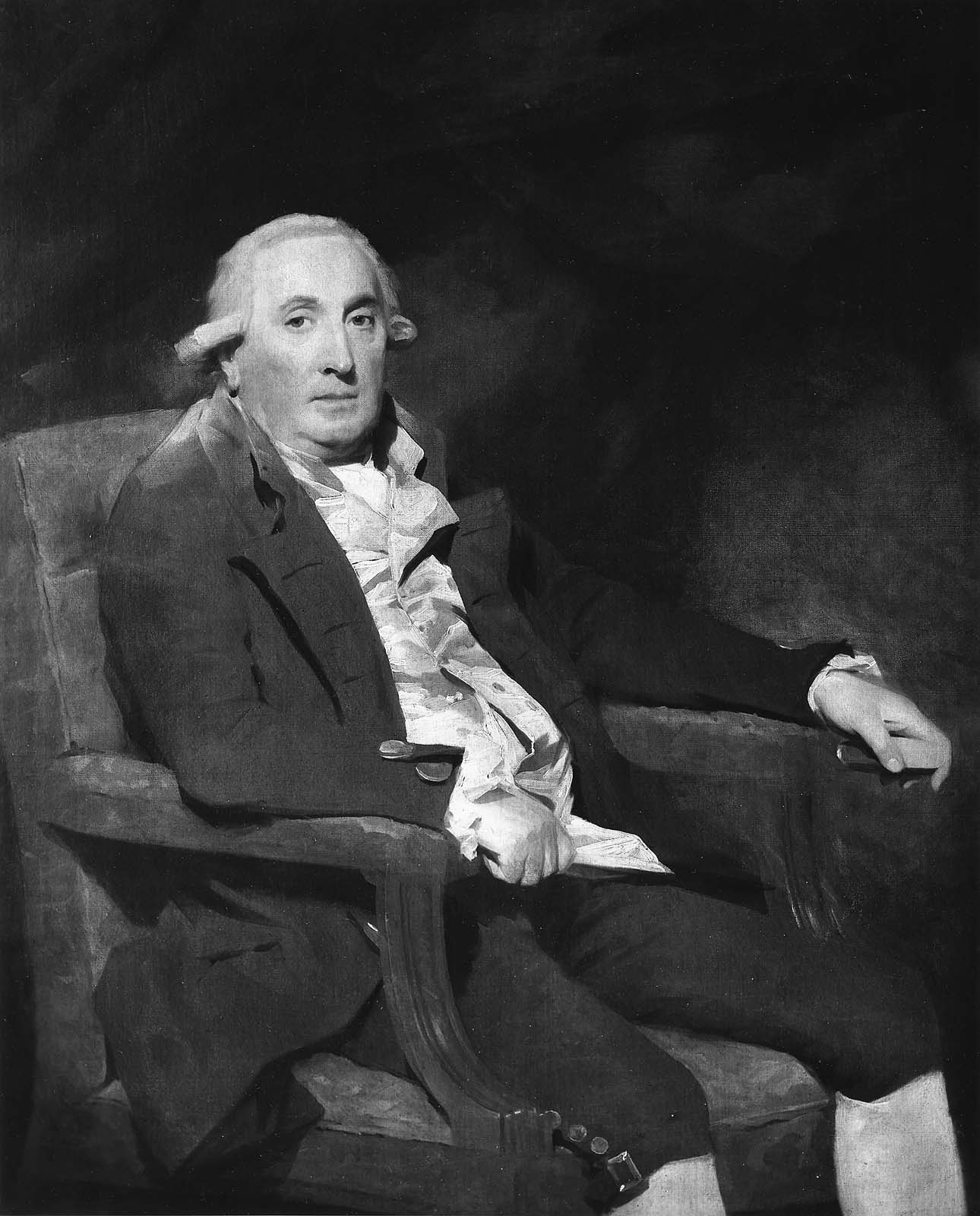
William Fairlie (1754 – 1825) East India Company Merchant, Financier and Ship Owner, by Sir Henry Raeburn

Fairlie cost 130,000 rupees to build.

EIC voyage #1 (1810): Captain William Parker D'Esterre sailed from Saugor on 19 July 1810, bound for England. (Note: Captain D'Estere had been captain of United Kingdom when the French captured her late in 1809.) She reached Madras on 30 August and St Helena on 3 December, and arrived at The Downs on 26 February 1811.

Fairlie, Fairlie, Fergusson, & Co., owners, appeared in a list of vessels registered in Calcutta in January 1811.

EIC voyage #2 (1812–1814): Captain D'Esteree acquired a letter of marque on 30 November 1811. He sailed from Portsmouth on 3 June 1812, bound for Batavia, Madras, and Bengal. Fairlie reached Madeira on 18 June and arrived at Saugor on 5 December. She then sailed on to Penang (28 March 1813) and Malacca (7 April).

On 21 April, Fairlie grounded on a coral shoal at 3°27′S 107°1′E, which is about 100 miles north of Jakarta and the channel to the west of Bangka Island. This shoal became known as "Fairlie Rock", or more currently "Fairlie Klip" or "Fairlie Rif". Apparently Fairlie got off the shoal without material damage.

On 1 May, Fairlie reached Batavia. She sailed to Samarang, which she reached on 26 May, before returning to Batavia on 18 June.

By 18 July, Fairlie was again at Madras, and by 17 August Kidderpore. Homeward bound, she was at Saugor on 2 November, the Cape of Good Hope on 1 March 1814, and St Helena on 18 March.

On 31 May, Fairlie arrived at Deal with several Indiamen (including Charles Mills and Baring) and two whalers (including Indispensable), all under escort by HMS Cornwallis. Fairlie arrived at Blackwall on 3 June.

EIC voyage #3 (1815–1816): Captain Thomas E. Ward sailed from The Downs on 22 May 1815, bound for Bengal and Batavia. On 10 June Fairlie reached Madeira.

Mount Tambora exploded in April 1815. Between 1 and 3 October Fairlie sailed for two days through extensive pumice rafts about 3,600 km (2,237 mi) west of Tambora. Fairlie arrived at the New Anchorage (near Diamond Harbour and Kedgeree) on 31 October. Homeward bound, Fairlie was at Batavia on 20 April, reached St Helena on 21 August, and arrived at Blackwall on 8 November.

EIC voyage #4 (1818–1819): Captain Ward sailed from The Downs on 1 April 1818, bound for Bengal and Bombay. Fairlie reached Diamond Harbour on 7 August. Homeward bound, she was at the New Anchorage on 3 October, and Bombay on 8 December. She was at Tellichery on 2 January 1819, reached St Helena on 26 March, and arrived at Blackwall on 8 June.

== Free trader ==
In 1813, the EIC lost its monopoly on the trade between Britain and India; it retained its monopoly on the trade between Britain and China. Many vessels then entered the trade with India, becoming Free Traders sailing under licenses from the EIC. Fairlie's owners gave up their status as an EIC regular ship and converted to Free Trader status.

Fairlie continue to trade between Britain and India, and later South America, but also began transporting convicts and carrying migrants.

On 3 December 1825, Fairlie rescued Captain Carss, one passenger, and eleven crew from Nassau. Nassau had wrecked on the island of Tristan da Cunha on 31 August.

First convict voyage (1833–1834): Captain Henry Ager sailed from England on 27 October 1833 and arrived at Sydney on 15 February 1834. Fairlie had embarked 374 male convicts and she landed 372, having suffered four convict deaths en route.

Immigrants to New South Wales (1838): Fairlie, again commanded by Captain Henry Ager sailed from Plymouth on 31 July, continued on from the Cape of Good Hope on 21 October, and arrived at Port Jackson on 6 December 1838. Aboard were nearly 20 cabin-class passengers, amongst whom was Major-General Sir Maurice O'Connell, the former Lieutenant-Governor of New South Wales, coming to take up his command of the colony's military forces. There were also 277 Steerage passengers aboard.

Immigrants to South Australia (1840): Captain Edward Garrett sailed Fairlie from London on 3 April 1840 with cargo and 266 passengers. She arrived at Port Adelaide on 6 July.

Immigrants to New South Wales (1841): Fairlie arrived on 5 November 1841 at Sydney. She had left Cork, with 308 bounty immigrants, and a number of cabin and intermediate passengers. She had suffered six deaths on board, four of them children under the age of five.

In 1843, Fairlie was sold to Joseph Somes, London.

Second convict voyage (1852): Captain Edward Pavey sailed from Plymouth on 11 March 1852 and arrived at Hobart on 3 July. She had embarked 294 male convicts and she landed 292, having suffered two convict deaths en route.

Immigrants to British Guiana (1860–1861): Fairlie sailed from India on 12 December 1860 with 367 immigrants for British Guiana.

== Fate ==
In 1865, the Merchant Shipping Co., Ltd., London, became Fairlie's owner. Lloyd's Register for 1866 shows Fairlie with Stephens, master, Merchant, owner, and trade London–Australia. The entry for her is market "LOST".

The Times reported that on 6 January 1866 Innisfallen had delivered the crew of Fairlie to Mauritius. Apparently Fairlie had encountered a heavy cyclone on 23 November 1865 that dismasted her and her crew abandoned her on the 27th at 10°N 83°E, either very leaky or having foundered. Innisfallen had been on her way from Calcutta to London when she rescued the survivors.
