= John Ommanney =

Royal Navy Admiral (1773–1855)

Admiral Sir John Ommanney KCB
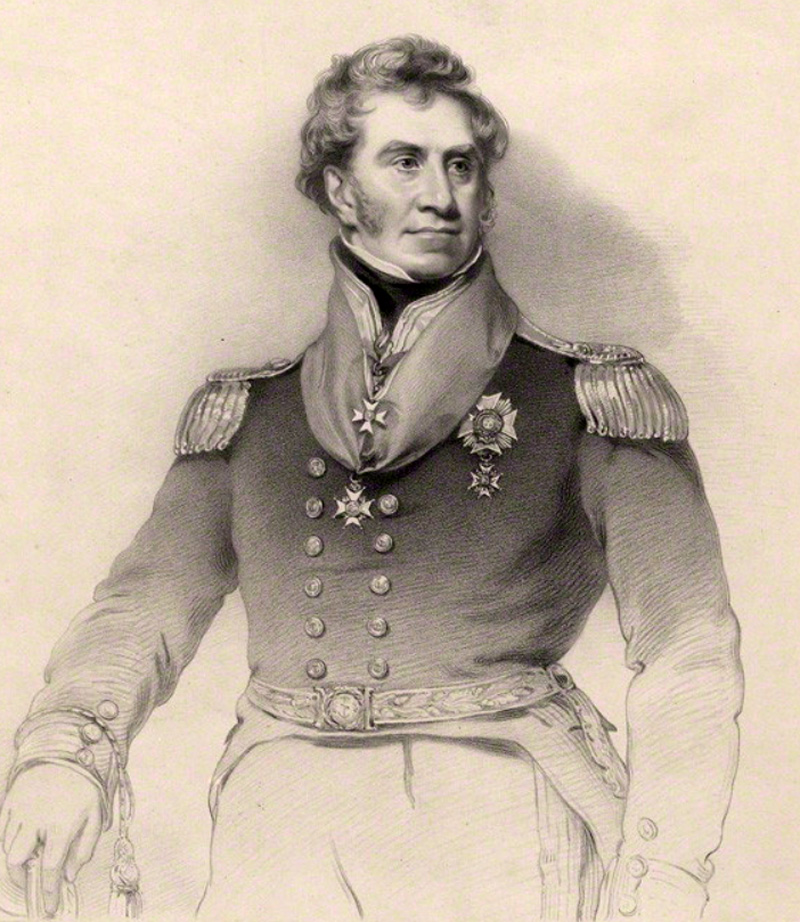
- Born: 17 October 1773; Westminster, Middlesex, England
- Died: 8 July 1855 (aged 81); Havant, Hampshire
- Military career
- Allegiance: United Kingdom
- Branch: Royal Navy
- Rank: Admiral
- Commands: HMS Hussar; HMS Robust; HMS Barfleur; Plymouth Command
- Conflicts: Greek War of Independence; Oriental Crisis
- Awards: Knight Commander of the Order of the Bath; Order of the Redeemer

Admiral Sir John Acworth Ommanney KCB (17 October 1773 – 8 July 1855) was a Royal Navy officer who went on to be Commander-in-Chief, Plymouth.

== Naval career ==
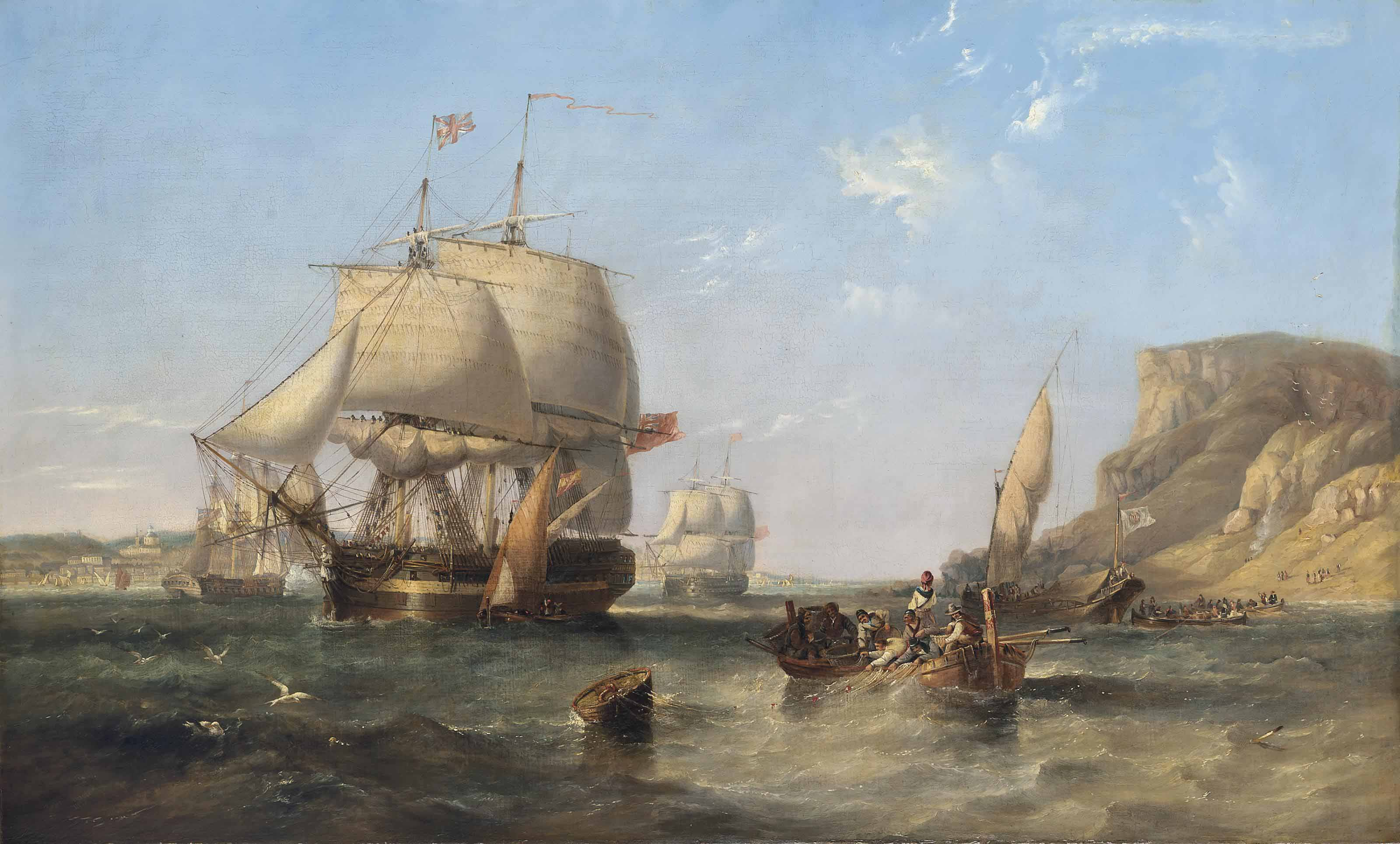
HMS Donegal, 74-guns, flying the flag of Rear-Admiral Sir John Ommanney, heading down the Tagus past the Church of Santa-Engracia. James Wilson Carmichael

Ommanney joined the Royal Navy in 1786. Promoted Commander in 1796, he was given command of a brig and arrested a fleet of Swedish merchant ships in the North Sea. Promoted to Post Captain in 1800, he commanded HMS Hussar, HMS Robust and then HMS Barfleur. In 1825 he took command of HMS Albion and took part in the Battle of Navarino in 1827.

He was appointed Commander-in-Chief, Lisbon in 1837 and then Second-in-Command of the Mediterranean Fleet in 1840 during the Oriental Crisis. He was made Commander-in-Chief, Plymouth in 1851. He died on 8 July 1855.

== Family ==
In 1803, he married Frances Ayling; they had four daughters.

== See also ==
- Northbrook Park, Farnham, Surrey
- O'Byrne, William Richard (1849). "Ommanney, John Acworth" . A Naval Biographical Dictionary . John Murray – via Wikisource.

Military offices
Preceded by Sir William Gage	Commander-in-Chief, Plymouth; 1851–1854	Succeeded by Sir William Parker
