= List of ship launches in 1815 =

The list of ship launches in 1815 includes a chronological list of some ships launched in 1815.

Date	Ship	Class	Builder	Location	Country	Notes
25 January	Sphynx	Sloop	Jamsetjee Bomanjee Wadia	Bombay	India	For Royal Navy.
26 January	Redoubtable	Vengeur-class ship of the line	Edward Sison	Woolwich Dockyard	United Kingdom	For Royal Navy.
20 February	Dumbarton Castle	Paddle steamer	Archibald Maclauchlan	Dumbarton	United Kingdom	For Glasgow Castle Steam Packet Co.
24 February	Romney	Salisbury-class ship of the line	John Pelham	Frindsbury	United Kingdom	For Royal Navy.
24 February	Wellesley	Black Prince-class ship of the line	Jamsetjee Bomanjee Wadia	Bombay Dockyard	India	For Royal Navy.
25 February	Angerstein	Brig	Rollett	Grimsby	United Kingdom	For private owner.
25 February	Bengal	East Indiaman	Steele & Carsewell	Greenock	United Kingdom	For Cropper, Benson & Co.
February	Britannia	Paddle steamer	John Hunter	Port Glasgow	United Kingdom	For Lewis MacLellan and A. McTaggart.
11 March	St Vincent	Nelson-class ship of the line	Thomas Roberts	Plymouth Dockyard	United Kingdom	For Royal Navy.
28 March	Howe	Nelson-class ship of the line	Robert Seppings	Chatham Dockyard	United Kingdom	For Royal Navy.
March	Duke of Wellington	Brig		Pulteneytown	United Kingdom	For private owner.
11 April	Cybèle	Pallas-class frigate			France	For French Navy.
12 April	Neptune	Merchantman	J. Kyd & Co.	Kidderpore	India	For Hook & Co.
17 April	East Indian	Merchantman	J. Kyd & Co., or Kyd & Richards	Kidderpore	India	For private owner.
18 April	Genoa	Téméraire-class ship of the line		Genoa	(France) French First Empire	For Royal Navy.
25 April	Defence	Vengeur-class ship of the line	George Parkin	Chatham Dockyard	United Kingdom	For Royal Navy.
27 April	Caledonia	Paddle steamer	John Wood & Co.	Port Glasgow	United Kingdom	For Caledonia Steam Boat Company.
14 May	Margery	Paddle steamer	Archibald McLauchlin & William Denny	Dumbarton	United Kingdom	For private owner.
23 May	Golconda	Merchantman	Michael Smith	Calcutta	India	For private owner.
26 May	Hercule	Téméraire-class ship of the line		Toulon	France	For French Navy.
May	Greenock	Steamship	John Denny	Dumbarton	United Kingdom	For Andrew Shearer.
7 June	Woodford	West Indiaman	Fishburn & Broderick	Whitby	United Kingdom	For Mr. Chapman.
19 June	Brothers	Full-rigged ship	W. S. Chapman & Co.	Whitby	United Kingdom	For Aaron Chapman.
23 June	Cambridge	Third rate	William Stone	Deptford Dockyard	United Kingdom	For Royal Navy.
23 June	Waterloo	Merchantman	Peter Blackburn	Plymouth	United Kingdom	For Mr. Rutledge.
13 July	Merkurii	Spechnyi-class frigate	B. F. Stoke	Saint Petersburg	Russia	For Imperial Russian Navy.
15 July	Perseverance	Sloop	Matthew & William Moody	Gainsborough	United Kingdom	For private owner.
19 July	Liguria	Galley	Duchy of Genoa	Genoa	United Kingdom	For Genoese Navy.
22 July	Hecla	Hecla-class bomb vessel	Barkworth, Hawkes & Co.	Hessle	United Kingdom	For Royal Navy.
22 July	Waterloo	Barque	George Hillhouse, Sons, & Co.	Bristol	United Kingdom	For George Hillhouse, Sond, & Co.
26 July	Infernal	Hecla-class bomb vessel	Barkworth, Hawkes & Co	Hessle	United Kingdom	For Royal Navy.
July	Duke of Wellington	Merchantman	Bell and Grange	Grimsby	United Kingdom	For private owner.
July	Editha	Snow	G. D. Smith	Scarborough	United Kingdom	For private owner.
July	Lord Normanby	Brig	Feetham	Sunderland	United Kingdom	For private owner.
July	Morning Star	Merchantman	Richard Walker	Grimsby	United Kingdom	For private owner.
July	Pacific	Snow	Tindall	Scarborough	United Kingdom	For private owner.
7 August	Byron	Snow		Stockton-on-Tees	United Kingdom	For private owner.
7 August	Tecumseh	Schooner	George Moore	Chippawa	(United Kingdom of Great Britain and Ireland) Upper Canada	For Royal Navy.
21 August	Franklin	Ship of the line	Samuel Humphreys & Charles Penrose	Philadelphia, Pennsylvania	United States	For United States Navy.
29 August	Tom Bowline	Merchantman	J. and H. Smith	Gainsborough	United Kingdom	For private owner.
August	Erato	Barque	J. Hutchinson	Sunderland	United Kingdom	For private owner.
5 September	Hercules	Vengeur-class ship of the line	George Parkin	Chatham Dockyard	United Kingdom	For Royal Navy.
5 September	Mary	Brig	Bird	Tranmere	United Kingdom	For private owner.
20 September	Waterloo	Merchantman	Chapman & Ellis	Bideford	United Kingdom	For William Fry.
3 October	Caledonia	East Indiaman	John & Philip Laing	Sunderland	United Kingdom	For Laing & Co.
5 October	Zenobia	Merchantman	Matthew Smith	Calcutta	India	For private owner.
9 October	Bromby	Smack	Gill	Aberdeen	United Kingdom	For Aberdeen & Hull Shipping Company.
19 October	Stately	Smack	James Birnie	Montrose	United Kingdom	For Old Shipping Co.
October	Sir John Cameron	Brig		Corpach	United Kingdom	For private owner.
1 November	Marquis of Anglesea	Merchantman	B. Heward	Sunderland, County Durham	United Kingdom	For private owner.
7 November	Augustus	Frigate		Venice	Austrian Empire	For Austrian Navy.
7 November	Cesare	Téméraire-class ship of the line		Venice	Austrian Empire	For Austrian Navy.
15 November	Waterloo	Sloop	J. Vellan	Leeds	United Kingdom	For H. Harrison.
16 November	Java	Fourth rate	Edward Churchill	Plymouth Dockyard	United Kingdom	For Royal Navy.
18 November	Melpomene	Merchantman	George Dobson & Joseph Wales	King's Lynn	United Kingdom	For Mr. Vidal.
November	Waterloo	Packet ship	Foster & Co.	Selby	United Kingdom	For private owner.
12 December	Iason	Corvette	A. I. Melikhov	Sevastopol	Russia	For Imperial Navy.
18 December	Zebra	Cruizer-class brig-sloop	Jamsetjee Bomanjee Wadia	Bombay Dockyard	India	For Royal Navy.
19 December	Actaeon	Merchantman	Thomas Owen	Topsham	United Kingdom	For private owner.
19 December	British Queen	Steamship	Smith & Co.	Gainsborough	United Kingdom	For private owner.
19 December	Friend's Goodwill	Brig	Moody & Co	Gainsborough, Lincolnshire	United Kingdom	For private owner.
December	Industry	Brig	Bell & Grage	Grimsby	United Kingdom	For private owner.
Unknown date	Actaeon	Merchantman		Calcutta	India	For J. Scott & Co.
Unknown date	Alexander	Merchantman	John Brockbank	Lancaster	United Kingdom	For private owner.
Unknown date	Alliance	Merchantman		Sunderland	United Kingdom	For private owner.
Unknown date	Ann & Dorothy	Merchantman	John M. & William Gales	Sunderland	United Kingdom	For John M. & Willia Gales.
Unknown date	Argyle	Paddle steamer	J. & C. Wood	Glasgow	United Kingdom	For private owner.
Unknown date	Asia	Merchantman	Matthew Smith	Calcutta	India	For Charles A. Hackett.
Unknown date	Burc i Zafer	Third rate		Constantinople	Ottoman Empire	For Ottoman Navy.
Unknown date	Avon	Full-rigged ship		Boston, Massachusetts	United States	For private owner.
Unknown date	Belle Alliance	Merchantman	Barry Patourel	Saint Peter Port	(England) Guernsey	For J. Vidamour.
Unknown date	Boxer	Full-rigged ship			United States	For United States Navy.
Unknown date	Braddock	Merchantman			United Kingdom	For private owner.
Unknown date	Brigantine	Sloop		Bombay	India	For Royal Navy.
Unknown date	Christopher	Merchantman	John Brockbank	Lancaster	United Kingdom	For private owner.
Unknown date	Creole	Merchantman	John Brockbank	Lancaster	United Kingdom	For private owner.
Unknown date	Cyrus	Whaler	Holt & Richardson	Whitby	United Kingdom	For private owner.
Unknown date	DBUS Tijger	Full-rigged ship			Netherlands	For Dutch Navy.
Unknown date	Dorothy	Merchantman		Liverpool	United Kingdom	For private owner.
Unknown date	Echo	Full-rigged ship			Netherlands	For Dutch Navy.
Unknown date	Eliza	Merchantman		Java	Netherlands East Indies	For private owner.
Unknown date	Elizabeth	Square		Sunderland	United Kingdom	For private owner.
Unknown date	Fame	Merchantman	John Goodie	Quebec	(United Kingdom of Great Britain and Ireland) Upper Canada	For private owner.
Unknown date	Firebrand	Full-rigged ship			United States	For United States Navy.
Unknown date	Four Sisters	Merchantman		Rangoon	(United Kingdom of Great Britain and Ireland) Burma	For private owner.
Unknown date	Frederiksvœrn	Brig			Norway	For Royal Norwegian Navy.
Unknown date	Gallant	Snow		Sunderland	United Kingdom	For private owner.
Unknown date	Garland	Privateer		Quincy, Massachusetts	United States	For private owner.
Unknown date	Glenbervie	Merchantman		Port Glasgow	United Kingdom	For Douglas & Co.
Unknown date	Globe	Whaler		Nantucket, Massachusetts	United States	For private owner.
Unknown date	Hero	Merchantman	John M. & William Gales	Sunderland	United Kingdom	For Thomas Railston Cooper.
Unknown date	Isabella	Merchantman	John & Philip Laing	Sunderland	United Kingdom	For Laing & Co.
Unknown date	James	Merchantman	John M. & William Gales	Sunderland	United Kingdom	For James Sheal.
Unknown date	John and Mary	Merchantman	A. Cockburn	Sunderland	United Kingdom	For private owner.
Unknown date	John Bull	Merchantman	James Scott & Co.	Calcutta	India	For private owner.
Unknown date	John Bull	Packet ship	Matthew & William Moody	Gainsborough	United Kingdom	For J. Bell & Co.
Unknown date	Lavinia	Snow	John M. & William Gales	Sunderland	United Kingdom	For private owner.
Unknown date	Liverpool	Merchantman	Michael Smith	Calcutta	India	For J. Green & Co.
Unknown date	Margaret	Brig		Monkwearmouth	United Kingdom	For private owner.
Unknown date	Necm i Sevket	Third rate		Eerğli	Ottoman Empire	For Ottoman Navy.
Unknown date	Nicholas	Snow		Aberdeen	United Kingdom	For private owner.
Unknown date	Phoenix	Paddle steamer	Lake Champlain Steam-boat Company	Vergennes, Vermont	United States	For builder.
Unknown date	Picton	Merchantman		Bristol	United Kingdom	For Josiah Gist, George Hilhouse, James Martin Hilhouse, and Robert Hilhouse.
Unknown date	Prince Blucher	Merchantman		Chittagong	India	For C. Blaney.
Unknown date	Princess Charlotte	Merchantman	Thomas Brocklebank	Whitehaven	United Kingdom	For Thomas Brocklebank.
Unknown date	Providence	Snow	W. Feetham	Monkwearmouth	United Kingdom	For private owner.
Unknown date	Sea Flower	Merchantman		Sunderland	United Kingdom	For B. Robson.
Unknown date	Spring	Snow	James Johnson	Sunderland	United Kingdom	For private owner.
Unknown date	Thyatira	Brig		Sunderland	United Kingdom	For private owner.
Unknown date	Torch	Lightship		Bombay	India	For Bombay Pilot Service.
Unknown date	Traveller	Merchantman		Peterhead	United Kingdom	For private owner.
Unknown date	Triton	Merchantman		Calcutta	India	For private owner.
Unknown date	Unity	Snow	John M. & William Gales	Sunderland	United Kingdom	For John White.
Unknown date	Wesp	Full-rigged ship			Netherlands	For Dutch Navy.
Unknown date	Widdrington	Brig		Sunderland	United Kingdom	For private owner.
Unknown date	Waterloo	Merchantman		St. Martin's	(United Kingdom of Great Britain and Ireland) Upper Canada	For private owner.
Unknown date	Waterloo	Merchantman		Sunderland	United Kingdom	For Mr. Grenville.
Unknown date	Waterloo	Merchantman		Great Yarmouth	United Kingdom	For Mr. Preston.
