= Waterloo (ship) =

After 18 June 1815, numerous British ships have been named Waterloo for the British victory at the Battle of Waterloo:

- Waterloo (1815 ship) was a merchant ship built at Bristol, England in 1815. On her first voyage she suffered a short-lived mutiny. She then made one voyage under charter to the British East India Company (EIC). She made four voyages transporting convicts from England to Australia, and two voyages from Ireland to Australia. On her seventh convict voyage Waterloo wrecked on 28 August 1842, in Table Bay with great loss of life.
- Waterloo (1815 Bideford ship) was launched at Bideford, originally as a West Indiaman. Between 1817 and 1821, she made three voyages to India. She then returned to the West Indies trade. Her crew abandoned her at sea in 1829.
- Waterloo (1815 New Brunswick ship), launched at St. Martins, New Brunswick. She was last listed in 1848.
- Waterloo (1815 Plymouth ship) was launched at Plymouth. She made two voyages to India. Heavy seas in October 1820, so damaged her that her crew had to abandon her in the North Atlantic.
- Waterloo (1815 Sunderland ship), launched at Sunderland, was wrecked in October 1821, at Fishhook Bay, Cape of Good Hope.
- Waterloo (1815 Yarmouth ship), was launched at Yarmouth. She sailed first as a West Indiaman. After a mishap in 1822, she was returned to service and traded with the Mediterranean and South America. She was briefly a coaster sailing out of Lynn until she foundered in August 1833.
- Waterloo (1816 EIC ship), was launched at London and made nine voyages for the EIC before she was broken up in 1834.

== See also ==
- HMS Waterloo – one of two vessels of the Royal Navy
