= List of shipwrecks in January 1829 =

The list of shipwrecks in January 1829 includes some ships sunk, wrecked or otherwise lost during January 1829.

== 1 January ==
List of shipwrecks: 1 January 1829
Ship	State	Description
Ann	United Kingdom	The ship was driven ashore at Scheveningen. South Holland, Netherlands. She was on a voyage from Boston, Lincolnshire to Maassluis, South Holland.
Duchess of Leinster	United Kingdom	The sloop was driven ashore at the mouth of the River Ribble. She was on a voyage from Ardglass, County Down to Liverpool, Lancashire. Duchess of Leinster was repaired and taken in to Ravenglass, Cumberland on 19 January.

== 2 January ==
List of shipwrecks: 2 January 1829
Ship	State	Description
Navigator	United Kingdom	The ship was wrecked near Stavanger, Norway.
Sarah	United Kingdom	The ship was wrecked near Stromness, Orkney Islands. She was on a voyage from Liverpool, Lancashire to Aberdeen.
Stranger	United Kingdom	The ship departed from the Isle of Man for Chester, Cheshire. No further trace, presumed foundered in the Irish Sea with the loss of all hands.

== 3 January ==
List of shipwrecks: 3 January 1829
Ship	State	Description
Cotton	United Kingdom	The ship departed from Whitehaven, Cumberland for Dublin. No further trace, presumed foundered in the Irish Sea with the loss of all hands.
Mary Ann	United Kingdom	The schooner was wrecked in Godrevy Bay with the loss of all on board.
Perseverance	United Kingdom	The ship was driven ashore and wrecked at Blyth, Northumberland. She was on a voyage from Aberdeen to South Shields, County Durham.
William and Ellen	United Kingdom	The ship was driven ashore in Clonakilty Bay. She was on a voyage from Gallipoli, Ottoman Empire to Liverpool, Lancashire.

== 4 January ==
List of shipwrecks: 4 January 1829
Ship	State	Description
Anglem	United Kingdom	The ship was driven ashore at Holyhead, Anglesey.
Ark	United Kingdom	The ship was driven onto the Gunfleet Sand, in the North Sea of the coast of Essex and sank with the loss of a crew member.
Brothers	United Kingdom	The sloop was driven ashore and wrecked near the Corsewall Lighthouse, Dumfriesshire. Her crew were rescued. She was on a voyage from Glasgow, Renfrewshire to Dundalk, County Louth.
Elizabeth	United Kingdom	The ship was driven ashore at Boscastle, Cornwall. She was on a voyage from Youghal, County Cork to London.
Hoppet	Denmark	The ship was lost near Saltfleet, Lincolnshire, United Kingdom with the loss of all but two of her crew. She was on a voyage from Copenhagen to Hull, Yorkshire, United Kingdom.
John and Matilda	United Kingdom	The ship was wrecked at Padstow, Cornwall. Her crew were rescued.
Margaret	United Kingdom	The brig was wrecked in Widemouth Bay. She was on a voyage from Liverpool, Lancashire to Great Yarmouth, Norfolk.
Matty	United Kingdom	The ship was driven ashore and wrecked at the "Pile of Foudry".
Molly	Hamburg	The galiot was driven ashore and wrecked at Boulogne, Pas-de-Calais, France. She was on a voyage from Danzig, Prussia to Boulogne.
Sally	United Kingdom	The ship was driven ashore at Holyhead.
Venerable	United Kingdom	The brig was driven ashore and wrecked near Boscastle with the loss of a crew member. She was on a voyage from Newport, Monmouthshire to Newcastle upon Tyne, Northumberland.
William	United Kingdom	The ship was driven ashore and wrecked at Caister-on-Sea, Lincolnshire. She was on a voyage from Saint Petersburg, Russia to London.
William	United Kingdom	The schooner was driven ashore and wrecked at Boulogne. She was on a voyage from London to Weymouth, Dorset.

== 5 January ==
List of shipwrecks: 5 January 1829
Ship	State	Description
Amity	United Kingdom	The ship was wrecked on the Kentish Knock, in the North Sea off the coast of Kent. She was on a voyage from Rotterdam, South Holland, Netherlands to London.
Ann	United Kingdom	The ship was driven ashore at Liverpool, Lancashire.
Bienenkorb	Prussia	The ship was wrecked at North Foreland, Kent.
Hope of Hoffnung	flag unknown	The ship was wrecked near Saltfleet, Lincolnshire, United Kingdom. She was on a voyage from Copenhagen, Denmark to Hull, Yorkshire, United Kingdom.
Malta	United Kingdom	The ship was sighted off Land's End, Cornwall whilst on a voyage from Looe, Cornwall to Liverpool. No further trace, presumed foundered with the loss of all hands.
Maria Regina	Bremen	The ship was driven ashore and wrecked near Aldeburgh, Suffolk, United Kingdom. She was on a voyage from Bremen to London, United Kingdom.
Scarboro	United Kingdom	The ship was driven ashore at Margate, Kent.
Shannon	United Kingdom	The brig foundered in the English Channel off Cap La Havre, Seine-Inférieure, France. Her crew were rescued by the Le Havre pilot boat.
Sir Alexander M^{c}Kenzie	United Kingdom	The ship was driven on to the Mundaca Bank, 15 nautical miles (28 km) east of Bilbao, Spain. Her crew were rescued. She was on a voyage from London to Bilbao.
Tranby	United Kingdom	The ship was driven ashore and capsized in the Humber 2 nautical miles (3.7 km) downstream of Hull. She was on a voyage from Arkhangelsk, Russia to Hull. Tranby was refloated on 7 January and taken in to Hull.
Young Norval	United Kingdom	The ship was driven ashore in the Humber.

== 6 January ==
List of shipwrecks: 6 January 1829
Ship	State	Description
Garland	United Kingdom	The ship foundered in the Irish Sea off Beaumaris, Anglesey. She was refloated the next day and taken in to Beaumaris.
John Craig	United Kingdom	The ship foundered in the North Sea off Spurn Point, East Riding of Yorkshire. Her crew were rescued. She was on a voyage from "Steige" to Hull, Yorkshire.
Margaret	United Kingdom	The ship was driven ashore and wrecked at Wexford.

== 7 January ==
List of shipwrecks: 7 January 1829
Ship	State	Description
Brenchley	United Kingdom	The ship was wrecked on the Shingles Sand, in the North Sea off the coast of Kent. Her crew survived.
Fame	United Kingdom	The ship was wrecked on the Whiting Sand, in the North Sea off the coast of Suffolk. Her crew were rescued. She was on a voyage from the Firth of Forth to London.
Radius	United Kingdom	The ship was lost on the Middle Sand, in the North Sea off the coast of Essex Her crew were rescued.
Smales	United Kingdom	The brig was driven ashore in Bridlington Bay. Her crew were rescued. She was refloated on 22 January and taken in to Bridlington, Yorkshire.

== 8 January ==
List of shipwrecks: 8 January 1829
Ship	State	Description
Kern	United Kingdom	The ship was wrecked on the Gunfleet Sand, in the North Sea off the coast of Essex. Her crew survived.
Margaret	United Kingdom	The ship was driven ashore and wrecked at Santander, Spain. Her crew were rescued.
Nettley	United Kingdom	The ship was wrecked on the Long Sand, in the North Sea off the coast of Essex. She was on a voyage from Antwerp, Netherlands to Plymouth, Devon.
Speculation	United Kingdom	The ship was wrecked at Madeira, Portugal.

== 9 January ==
List of shipwrecks: 9 January 1829
Ship	State	Description
Johanna Maria	Sweden	The ship was lost on the Cross Sand, in the North Sea. She was on a voyage from Landskrona to London, United Kingdom.
New Hope	United Kingdom	The ship foundered in the English Channel off The Lizard, Cornwall. Her crew were rescued. She was on a voyage from Newport, Monmouthshire to London.

== 10 January ==
List of shipwrecks: 10 January 1829
Ship	State	Description
Commerce	United Kingdom	The steamship broke in two in the Irish Sea off the Isle of Man. The two sections came ashore at Jurby and Kirk Michael.
Johns	United Kingdom	The schooner was driven ashore crewless at Beaumaris, Anglesey.
Perseverance	United Kingdom	The ship was abandoned in the Atlantic Ocean. Her crew were rescued by Isabella.

== 11 January ==
List of shipwrecks: 11 January 1829
Ship	State	Description
Guslaf	Norway	The brigantine foundered in the North Sea off Corton, Suffolk, United Kingdom.
Sarah	United Kingdom	The sloop was wrecked off Blackpool, Lancashire. Both crew were rescued.

== 12 January ==
List of shipwrecks: 12 January 1829
Ship	State	Description
Anversoise	Netherlands	The ship departed from Antwerp for Valparaíso, Chile. No further trace, presumed foundered with the loss of all hands.
Harvest	United Kingdom	The ship was driven ashore at Scarborough, Yorkshire.

== 15 January ==
List of shipwrecks: 15 January 1829
Ship	State	Description
Eagle	United Kingdom	The sloop was lost in Pagona Bay, Dominica. Her crew were rescued.

== 17 January ==
List of shipwrecks: 17 January 1829
Ship	State	Description
Biddick	United Kingdom	The ship was lost off Harwich, Essex.
Johns	United Kingdom	The ship was wrecked off Beaumaris, Anglesey with the loss of all hands.

== 22 January ==
List of shipwrecks: 22 January 1829
Ship	State	Description
Mariner	United Kingdom	The ship was driven ashore and wrecked at Hemsby, Norfolk. Her crew were rescued by the Winterton Lifeboat.
Mary	United Kingdom	The ship ran aground on the Clipera Rocks, in the Irish Sea 4 nautical miles (7.4 km) east of Holyhead, Anglesey. She was on a voyage from Londonderry to Liverpool, Lancashire. She was refloated in mid-February and taken in to Holyhead.

== 23 January ==
List of shipwrecks: 23 January 1829
Ship	State	Description
Montagu	United Kingdom	The ship ran aground on the Long Bull, in the English Channel off Poole, Dorset. Her crew were rescued.
Union	United Kingdom	The ship was driven ashore at Great Yarmouth, Norfolk. Her crew were rescued. She was on a voyage from Dartford, Kent to King's Lynn, Norfolk.

== 24 January ==
List of shipwrecks: 24 January 1829
Ship	State	Description
Silvia	United Kingdom	The ship was driven ashore at Lowestoft, Suffolk. She was on a voyage from Danzig, Prussia to Lisbon, Portugal.
Thomas and Ann	United Kingdom	The ship was driven ashore at Harwich, Essex. She was refloated on 28 January and taken in to Harwich.

== 25 January ==
List of shipwrecks: 25 January 1829
Ship	State	Description
Capucho	Spain	The brig was wrecked on Ballycotton Island, County Cork, United Kingdom with the loss of a crew member. She was on a voyage from Bilbao to Bristol, Gloucestershire, United Kingdom.

== 26 January ==
List of shipwrecks: 26 January 1829
Ship	State	Description
Perseverance	United Kingdom	The brig was wrecked on "Inch Mickray". She was on a voyage from Peterhead, Aberdeenshire to Glasgow, Renfrewshire via the Forth and Clyde Canal.

== 27 January ==
List of shipwrecks: 27 January 1829
Ship	State	Description
Annie and Jessie	United Kingdom	The sloop was driven ashore and wrecked at Leith, Lothian.
John	United Kingdom	The ship was wrecked on the north west coast of Ireland.
Sally	United Kingdom	The ship was wrecked on the Goodwin Sands, Kent. Her crew were rescued.
Sauza e Bastos	Portugal	The ship was driven ashore and wrecked on the Old Head of Kinsale, County Cork, United Kingdom. Her crew were rescued. She was on a voyage from Lisbon to Cork and Dublin, United Kingdom.

== 28 January ==
List of shipwrecks: 28 January 1829
Ship	State	Description
Triumph	United Kingdom	The ship was driven ashore near Thisted, Denmark. Her crew were rescued. She was on a voyage from Gothenburg, Sweden to Newcastle upon Tyne, Northumberland.
Vine	United Kingdom	The ship sprang a leak and was beached at Blakeney, Norfolk. She was on a voyage from Hull, Yorkshire to King's Lynn, Norfolk. Vine was refloated on 30 January and taken in to Blakeney.

== 29 January ==
List of shipwrecks: 29 January 1829
Ship	State	Description
Agincourt	United Kingdom	The ship was lost on a reef at Antigua on her way to Nevis. Her crew was saved but her cargo lost.

== 30 January ==
List of shipwrecks: 30 January 1829
Ship	State	Description
Braddock	United Kingdom	Bradock was in a sinking state at 3°18′N 24°18′W. Charham took off the crew.

== Unknown date ==
List of shipwrecks: Unknown date 1829
Ship	State	Description
Bramley	United Kingdom	The ship was lost on the Shingles Sand, in the North Sea. Her crew were rescued.
Britannia	United Kingdom	The ship was lost in the Bristol Channel with the loss of all on board.
Catherine	United Kingdom	The ship sank near Formby, Lancashire.
Curlew	United Kingdom	The ship was lost off the Île de Ré, Charente-Maritime, France. She was on a voyage from London to the Charente River.
Dwina	Russia	The ship was wrecked in early January whilst on a voyage from Arkhangelsk to Bergen, Norway.
Eagle	United Kingdom	The ship was run down and sunk in the Irish Sea by Ocean (United Kingdom). Her crew were rescued by Ocean. She was on a voyage from Liverpool, Lancashire to Dingle, County Kerry.
Fortuna	Sweden	The ship foundered in the Kattegat off Varberg with the loss of all hands. She was on a voyage from Malmö to Hull, Yorkshire, United Kingdom.
Frau Maria	Kingdom of Hanover	The ship was wrecked on the Cork Sand, in the North Sea off the coast of Essex, United Kingdom in early January.
Helen	United Kingdom	The ship was wrecked at Miltown, County Clare. Her crew had abandoned her before she came ashore.
Isabella Johnston	United Kingdom	The sloop sprang a leak and was beached at Balcomie, Fife, where she was subsequently wrecked.
Kern	Hamburg	The ship was lost on the Gunfleet Sand, in the North Sea off the coast of Essex, United Kingdom. Her crew were rescued.
Lady Montgomery	United Kingdom	The ship was lost on the Ribble Banks, in the Irish Sea.
New Jane	United Kingdom	The ship was wrecked on or near the Wolf Rock, Cornwall before 19 January.
Queen Charlotte	United Kingdom	The ship was lost on a voyage from Newcastle upon Tyne, Northumberland to Leeds, Yorkshire.
Rambler	United Kingdom	The ship was driven ashore at Harwich, Essex in late January. She was on a voyage from Great Yarmouth, Norfolk to Liverpool. She was refloated on 28 January and taken in to Harwich.
Swallow	United Kingdom	The ship foundered in the Irish Sea off Bardsey Island, Caernarfonshire. Her crew were rescued. She was on a voyage from Waterford to Liverpool.
William	United Kingdom	The ship was driven ashore and wrecked at Boulogne, Pas-de-Calais, France between 4 and 7 January. Her crew were rescued.
