= Picton =

Picton may refer to:

== Places ==
=== Australia ===
- Picton, New South Wales, Australia
- Picton, Western Australia, an industrial suburb of Bunbury
- Picton East, Western Australia, a locality in the Shire of Dardanup
- Picton River, a river that joins the Huon River in Tasmania

=== Canada ===
- Picton, Ontario, Canada
  - CFB Picton, a former military installation

=== Chile ===
- Picton, Lennox and Nueva, islands off Tierra del Fuego, Chile

=== New Zealand ===
- Picton, New Zealand
  - Picton (New Zealand electorate)

=== United Kingdom ===
- Picton Castle, Pembrokeshire, Wales, a castle near Haverfordwest
- Picton, Cheshire, England, a hamlet near Chester
- Picton (ward), electoral division in Liverpool
- Picton, North Yorkshire, England, a hamlet near Middlesbrough

== People ==
- Cesar Picton (c. 1755 – 1836), from slave to successful businessman in England
- James Picton (1805–1889), Liverpool architect
- James Allanson Picton (1832–1910), British author, philosopher and politician
- Thomas Picton (1758–1815), Welsh general who led British forces in the Peninsular War
- Chris Picton (born 1983), an Australian politician

== Other uses ==
- Picton (1815 ship), a full-rigged ship, wrecked 1820
- SS Picton, involved in the Halifax Explosion (1917)
- Picton (racehorse), a competitor that failed to complete the 1848 Grand National
- Portrait of Thomas Picton, an 1815 painting by William Beechey

== See also ==
- Pickton (disambiguation)
