= List of shipwrecks in May 1858 =

The list of shipwrecks in May 1858 includes ships sunk, foundered, wrecked, grounded, or otherwise lost during May 1858.

== 1 May ==
List of shipwrecks: 1 May 1858
Ship	State	Description
Burrells	United Kingdom	The ship was wrecked on the coast of Newfoundland, British North America with the loss of four of her crew. She was on a voyage from Lancaster, Lancashire to Quebec City, Province of Canada, British North America.
Despina	Greece	The barque ran aground, broke her back and sank at South Shields, County Durham, United Kingdom. She was refloated on 19 May and beached.
Jane Smith	United Kingdom	The ship was driven ashore on the coast of Banffshire. She was on a voyage from Sunderland, County Durham to the River Spey.
Lady Albemarle	United Kingdom	The ship was wrecked at Speymouth, Aberdeenshire with the loss of two of her crew. She was on a voyage from Newcastle upon Tyne, Northumberland to Thurso, Caithness.
Orion	United Kingdom	The smack was last sighted on this day. Presumed wrecked in the Faroe Islands.
Rock	United Kingdom	The Mersey Flat collided with the tug Albert (United Kingdom) and sank in the River Mersey.
Violet	United Kingdom	The ship was driven ashore and wrecked on the coast of Banffshire. She was on a voyage from Sunderland to Speymouth.
Yorkshire	United Kingdom	The ship ran aground and became severely hogged at St. Ives, Cornwall.

== 2 May ==
List of shipwrecks: 2 May 1858
Ship	State	Description
Equivalent	United Kingdom	The ship was wrecked at Wyk auf Föhr, Duchy of Holstein. Her crew were rescued. She was on a voyage from Sunderland, County Durham to Hamburg.
Hope	United Kingdom	The ship was driven ashore and severely damaged at Goodwick, Pembrokeshire. She was on a voyage from Swansea, Glamorgan to Liverpool, Lancashire.
Petrel	France	The schooner sank at the mouth of the Lézarde. She was on a voyage from Sunderland, County Durham, United Kingdom to Honfleur, Calvados. She was later refloated and taken in to Harfleur, Calvados.
Traveller	United Kingdom	The whaler was driven ashore by ice and wrecked in Frobisher Bay. The whalers Gem and Jackall (both United Kingdom) rescued her crew.
True Blue	United Kingdom	The ship sank in Newbiggin Bay, Northumberland. She was on a voyage from Newcastle upon Tyne, Northumberland to St. Andrews, Fife.

== 3 May ==
List of shipwrecks: 3 May 1858
Ship	State	Description
Alma	United Kingdom	The ship was driven ashore on the Goodwick Sands, Pembrokeshire.
Mary Ann	United Kingdom	The ship foundered in the Irish Sea 8 nautical miles (15 km) south of Lytham St. Annes, Lancashire. Her crew were rescued. She was on a voyage from Barrow-in-Furness, Lancashire to Birkenhead, Cheshire.
William Edward	United Kingdom	The Mersey Flat was driven ashore and severely damaged on the Goodwick Sands.

== 4 May ==
List of shipwrecks: 4 May 1858
Ship	State	Description
Aurora	(Denmark) Duchy of Schleswig	The ship was wrecked at "Landhammer". She was on a voyage from Memel, Prussia to King's Lynn, Norfolk, United Kingdom.
Candace	United Kingdom	The steamship collided with the barque Yda Elizabeth (Netherlands and sank in the Atlantic Ocean (38°38′N 15°15′W) with the loss of seven lives. There were about 50 survivors, who were rescued by Yda Elizabeth. Candace was on a voyage from Africa to Plymouth, Devon.
Johanna Maria	Netherlands	The ship was driven ashore on Borkum, Kingdom of Hanover. Her crew were rescued. She was on a voyage from Bo'ness, Lothian, United Kingdom to Leer, Kingdom of Hanover.

== 5 May ==
List of shipwrecks: 5 May 1858
Ship	State	Description
Eclipse	Sweden	The ship was wrecked at Madras, India. Her seventeen crew were rescued.
Godavery	United Kingdom	The barque was wrecked at Madras. Her crew were rescued.
Königsberg	Prussia	The steamship caught fire and put in to Swinemünde, where she was beached. She was on a voyage from Stettin to Königsberg.
La Americaine	France	The ship was driven into Victoria Regia (United Kingdom) at Madras. She then drove ashore and was wrecked. All on board were rescued.
Swallow	United Kingdom	The ship sprang a leak and was abandoned in the North Sea (55°00′N 5°30′E). Her crew were rescued by Nautllus (Denmark). Swallow was on a voyage from South Shields, County Durham to Kronstadt, Russia. She was subsequently taken in to Hellevoetsluis, Zeeland by a Dutch fishing boat.
Victoria Regia	United Kingdom	The full-rigged ship was severely damaged when La Americaine (France) drove into her. Twelve of her 23 crew got aboard La Americaine. She subsequently drove out to sea.
Wales	United States	The ship was wrecked at Madras. Her twenty crew were rescued.
Wifeta	Norway	The brig was discovered derelict in the North Sea (56°40′N 3°10′E) by the brig Devonia (United Kingdom), which put a skeleton crew on board with the intention of taking her in to a port. Being unable to do so, salvage was sold to Osprey (United Kingdom), which towed her in to Hartlepool, County Durham, United Kingdom. Wifeta had been on a voyage from Gothenburg, Sweden to Antwerp, Belgium.

== 6 May ==
List of shipwrecks: 6 May 1858
Ship	State	Description
Factor	United Kingdom	The schooner ran aground at Caen, Calvados, France. She was on a voyage from Hartlepool, County Durham to Caen. She was refloated the next day and taken in to Caen.

== 7 May ==
List of shipwrecks: 7 May 1858
Ship	State	Description
Fanny	United Kingdom	The ship was driven ashore at "Henshaw Town", Fernando Po, Spanish Guinea.
Ostervald	Bremen	The ship was destroyed by fire 50 nautical miles (93 km) off Belize City, British Honduras. She was on a voyage from New Orleans, Louisiana, United States to Liverpool, Lancashire, United Kingdom.

== 9 May ==
List of shipwrecks: 9 May 1858
Ship	State	Description
Euphrates	United Kingdom	The steamship ran aground at Livorno, Grand Duchy of Tuscany. She was on a voyage from Liverpool, Lancashire to Livorno and Naples, Kingdom of the Two Sicilies. She was refloated and completed her voyage.
John Harris	United Kingdom	The ship ran aground on the Brake Sand. She was on a voyage from the River Tyne to Philadelphia, Pennsylvania. She was refloated.
Sultan	United Kingdom	The ship ran aground on the Carysfort Reef. She was on a voyage from New Orleans, Louisiana, United States to Liverpool. She was later refloated and taken in to Key West, Florida, United States, where she arrived on 15 May.

== 10 May ==
List of shipwrecks: 10 May 1858
Ship	State	Description
Arabia	United Kingdom	The ship was driven ashore at Cape Town, Cape Colony. She was on a voyage from Zanzibar to an American port. She had become a wreck by 20 May.

== 11 May ==
List of shipwrecks: 11 May 1858
Ship	State	Description
Catherine Maria	Stralsund	The ship ran aground off Great Yarmouth, Norfolk, United Kingdom. She was on a voyage from Stralsund to London, United Kingdom. She was refloated and taken in to Great Yarmouth in a leaky condition.
Grand Duchess	United States	The ship caught fire and was abandoned in the Atlantic Ocean. Her crew were rescued by Phoenix (United Kingdom). Grand Duchess was on a voyage from New York to Liverpool, Lancashire, United Kingdom.

== 12 May ==
List of shipwrecks: 12 May 1858
Ship	State	Description
Adah	(United Kingdom of Great Britain and Ireland) British North America	The schooner ran aground on the White Island Reef, in the Saint Lawrence River before 20 May. She was on a voyage from Halifax, Nova Scotia to Quebec City, Province of Canada. Adah floated off and sank. She was later refloated and beached at Bic, Province of Canada.
Brothers	United Kingdom	The barque ran ashore at Gibraltar. She was on a voyage from Odesa to Cork or Falmouth, Cornwall. She was refloated the next day.
Meannais	France	The brigantine struck the Penhouit Rocks, off the coast of Loire-Inférieure. She consequently sank off Saint Nazaire the next day. She was later refloated.
Vigilant	United Kingdom	The ship was driven ashore north of Great Yarmouth, Norfolk. She was on a voyage from Harwich, Essex to Whitby, Yorkshire. She was refloated and taken in to Great Yarmouth in a leaky condition.

== 13 May ==
List of shipwrecks: 13 May 1858
Ship	State	Description
Flor do Minho	Portugal	The schooner struck rocks at Cape Trafalgar, Spain and was abandoned. She was subsequently towed in to Catalan Bay in a waterlogged condition by the tug Wards (United Kingdom).
Kate	United Kingdom	The sloop collided with a brig and sank in the River Thames. She was on a voyage from Seaham, County Durham to London.

== 14 May ==
List of shipwrecks: 14 May 1858
Ship	State	Description
Cochrane	United Kingdom	The steamship ran aground at Sunderland, County Durham and was damaged. She was on a voyage from London to Sunderland. She was refloated with the assistance of several tugs and towed in to Sunderland.
Laxey	(United Kingdom of Great Britain and Ireland) Isle of Man	The schooner sank off Waterford. Her crew were rescued. She was on a voyage from Whitehaven, Cumberland to Neath, Glamorgan.

== 15 May ==
List of shipwrecks: 15 May 1858
Ship	State	Description
Burgermeister Petersen	Flag unknown	The ship ran aground on the Northern Reef, in the Baltic Sea.
Iberia, or Neva	United Kingdom	The ship sank in the River Tees. She was refloated on 18 May and taken in to Hartlepool, County Durham.
Margaret Ann	United Kingdom	The schooner ran ashore on Sanda Island, in the Firth of Clyde. She was on a voyage from Glasgow, Renfrewshire to Portrush, County Antrim. She was refloated and resumed her voyage.
Speed	United States	The ship was wrecked 40 nautical miles (74 km) east of Halifax, Nova Scotia, British North America. She was on a voyage from Mobile, Alabama to Quebec City, Province of Canada, British North America.
St. Eclair	United Kingdom	The tug ran aground and sank at Sunderland, County Durham. She was refloated and taken in to Sunderland.

== 16 May ==
List of shipwrecks: 16 May 1858
Ship	State	Description
Henry Jones	United Kingdom	The ship was destroyed by fire in the Atlantic Ocean. Her crew were rescued. She was on a voyage from Liverpool, Lancashire to Coquimbo, Chile.

== 17 May ==
List of shipwrecks: 17 May 1858
Ship	State	Description
Nancy	United Kingdom	The schooner foundered in the Bay of Biscay (45°35′N 8°40′W). Her four crew were rescued by the schooner Isis (United Kingdom). Nancy was on a voyage from Glasgow, Renfrewshire to Porto, Portugal.

== 18 May ==
List of shipwrecks: 18 May 1858
Ship	State	Description
Duke of Northumberland	United Kingdom	The tug collided with the paddle steamer Thistle (United Kingdom) and sank off Great Cumbrae, Ayrshire. Her six crew survived.
Essays	United Kingdom	The brig ran aground off Skagen, Denmark. She was on a voyage from Liverpool, Lancashire to Pillau, Prussia. She was refloated and resumed her voyage.
Euphemia	United Kingdom	The brig ran aground on the Cutler Sand, in the North Sea off the coast of Suffolk. She was refloated and resumed her voyage.
Johanna	Grand Duchy of Mecklenburg-Schwerin	The ship ran aground on the Skinburnness Spit, in the Irish Sea. She was on a voyage from Rostock to Dumfries, United Kingdom. She was refloated and taken in to Silloth, Cumberland, United Kingdom in a leaky condition.
One	United Kingdom	The schooner ran aground on the Holm Sand, in the North Sea off the coast of Suffolk. She was on a voyage from Sunderland, County Durham to Rotterdam, South Holland, Netherlands. She was refloated.

== 19 May ==
List of shipwrecks: 19 May 1858
Ship	State	Description
Blue Nose	United Kingdom	The ship was run down and sunk in the North Sea off Spurn Point, Yorkshire by West Kent (United Kingdom). Her crew were rescued by Norway (United Kingdom).
Hope	United Kingdom	The ship was wrecked in the Rangoon River. Her eighteen crew were rescued on 27 May by HMS Mohawk (Royal Navy).
Martha Johanna	Netherlands	The schooner ran aground on the Corton Sand, in the North Sea off the coast of Suffolk, United Kingdom. She was on a voyage from Newcastle upon Tyne, Northumberland, United Kingdom to Genoa, Kingdom of Sardinia. Martha Johanna was refloated and taken in to Great Yarmouth, Norfolk, United Kingdom in a leaky condition.

== 20 May ==
List of shipwrecks: 20 May 1858
Ship	State	Description
Alciope	United Kingdom	The brig ran aground on the Longsand, in the North Sea off the coast of Essex. She was on a voyage from Newcastle upon Tyne, Northumberland to "Sankgoum". Alciope was refloated with the assistance of two smacks and taken in to Harwich, Essex in a leaky condition.
Edward Oliver	(United Kingdom of Great Britain and Ireland) British North America	The ship was driven ashore on the north coast of Holy Isle, in the Firth of Clyde. She was on a voyage from New Orleans, Louisiana, United States to Liverpool, Lancashire. She was refloated on 22 May.
Egerton	United Kingdom	The barque was driven ashore and wrecked at Hirtshals, Denmark. Her crew were rescued. She was on a voyage from Newcastle upon Tyne to Kronstadt, Russia. She subsequently became a wreck.
Equivalent	United Kingdom	The brig was driven ashore on Amrum, Duchy of Holstein. Her crew were rescued.
Fleece	United Kingdom	The schooner was in collision with the brigantine Samuel P. Mussen (flag unknown) and sank in the English Channel 7 nautical miles (13 km) off Hythe, Kent. Her crew were rescued. She was on a voyage from London to Exeter, Devon.
Napoleon III	France	The 707-ton whaling ship was stove in by ice and lost in the Bering Sea near Saint Paul Island, Russian America. Sixteen members of her crew perished.
Wasp	United Kingdom	The yacht was wrecked at St. Andrews, Fife. All on board survived. She was on a voyage from Montrose, Forfarshire to St. Andrews.

== 21 May ==
List of shipwrecks: 21 May 1858
Ship	State	Description
Consud	France	The barque ran aground on the Corton Sand, in the North Sea off the coat of Suffolk, United Kingdom. She refloated and towed in to Lowestoft, Suffolk.
Cornelia	United Kingdom	The ship was wrecked on the Krishna Shoal, in the Rangoon River 90 nautical miles (170 km) from its mouth. She was on a voyage from Bombay, India to Rangoon, Burma.
Duchess of Northumberland	United Kingdom	The ship departed from Akyab, Burma for a British port. No further trace, presumed foundered with the loss of all hands.
Gleam	United Kingdom	The brig was wrecked on the Molasses Reef, in the Caicos Islands. Her crew survived.
Haabets Anker	Sweden	The barque was driven ashore at Nivas, near Helsingør, Denmark. She was on a voyage from Newcastle upon Tyne, Northumberland, United Kingdom to Stockholm.

== 23 May ==
List of shipwrecks: 23 May 1858
Ship	State	Description
Arab	United Kingdom	The collier, a brig, was run down and sunk in the River Thames at Charlton, Kent by the steamship John Howe with the loss of two of her seven crew. Survivors were rescued by the Coast Guard. It was alleged that John Howe was racing the steamship Black Diamond (United Kingdom) at the time.
Knickerbocker	United States	The ship was wrecked on the Crossing Rocks, east of the Abaco Islands with the loss of three lives. She was on a voyage from Liverpool, Lancashire, United Kingdom to New Orleans, Louisiana. She was destroyed by fire on 3 July.
Margaret	United Kingdom	The ship sprang a leak off the Formby Lightship ( Trinity House). She was beached on the Burbo Bank, in Liverpool Bay and sank. Her crew were rescued. Margaret was on a voyage from Liverpool to Londonderry.
Mary Davidson	United Kingdom	The barque was driven ashore on Gotland, Sweden. Her crew were rescued. She was on a voyage from Pärnu, Russia to Montrose, Forfarshire.
Suez	United Kingdom	The ship was wrecked between "Canisoon" and Canouan, Grenadine Islands. Her crew were rescued. She was on a voyage from Newport, Monmouthshire to Grenada.
Woodside	United Kingdom	The ship ran aground on the Brake Sand. She was on a voyage from Newcastle upon Tyne, Northumberland to Southampton, Hampshire. She was refloated and assisted in to Ramsgate, Kent in a leaky condition.

== 24 May ==
List of shipwrecks: 24 May 1858
Ship	State	Description
Anna	Netherlands	The barque was driven ashore and wrecked at Olaria, Brazil. Her crew were rescued.
Argus	United Kingdom	The ship ran aground in the River Welland. She was on a voyage from Aberdeen to Boston, Lincolnshire.
Three Sisters	United Kingdom	The sloop was driven ashore and wrecked 6 nautical miles (11 km) south of Bridlington, Yorkshire.

== 25 May ==
List of shipwrecks: 25 May 1858
Ship	State	Description
Catherine	United Kingdom	The brig ran aground at Hamburg. She was on a voyage from South Shields, County Durham to Hamburg.
Pilot	United Kingdom	The ship foundered off Rathlin Island, County Donegal. She was on a voyage from Galway to Liverpool, Lancashire.
Teazer	(United Kingdom of Great Britain and Ireland) Guernsey	The ship was wrecked at Saint-Malo, Ille-et-Vilaine, France with the loss of all eight people on board. She was on a voyage from Guernsey to Saint-Malo.
Waakzamheid	United Kingdom	The ship sank off "Striant Island", Outer Hebrides. Her crew were rescued. She was on a voyage from Belfast, County Antrim to Arkhangelsk, Russia.

== 27 May ==
List of shipwrecks: 27 May 1858
Ship	State	Description
HMS Carnation	Royal Navy	The Cruize-class brig-sloop ran aground in the River Medway. She was on a voyage from Chatham Dockyard to Sheerness Dockyard, Kent. She was refloated and taken in to Sheerness.
Delphin	Hamburg	The schooner was driven ashore on Amak Island, Denmark.
HMS Fly	Royal Navy	The Albacore-class gunboat collided with HMS Gloucester (Royal Navy) in the River Medway and was consequently beached at Gillingham, Kent. She was on a voyage from Chatham Dockyard to Sheerness Dockyard. She was later refloated and put back to Chatham.
Saucy Lass	United Kingdom	The ship sank in the Humber. Her crew were rescued. She was on a voyage from London to Hull, Yorkshire.

== 28 May ==
List of shipwrecks: 28 May 1858
Ship	State	Description
Ariel	United Kingdom	The ship struck the wreck of Northern Empire ( Grand Duchy of Oldenburg) and was beached at Falmouth, Cornwall. She was on a voyage from Dunkirk, Nord to Liverpool, Lancashire.
Orontes	United Kingdom	The ship capsized at Dublin and was severely damaged.

== 30 May ==
List of shipwrecks: 30 May 1858
Ship	State	Description
W. E. Malcolm	United Kingdom	The ship struck a rock in the L'Agulhas Reef and consequently put in to St. Simon's Bay, where she sank on 1 July.

== 31 May ==
List of shipwrecks: 31 May 1858
Ship	State	Description
Dr. Von Thunen Tellow	Flag unknown	The ship ran aground on the Troubridge Shoals. She was on a voyage from London, United Kingdom to Adelaide, South Australia. She was refloated and taken in to Adelaide in a leaky condition.

== Unknown date ==
List of shipwrecks: Unknown date in May 1858
Ship	State	Description
Alliance	Sweden	The schooner ran aground on the "Paternostee Sckeele". She was refloated and beached on Enholmen. Subsequently refloated and taken in to Marstrand, where she arrived on 8 May.
Ann and Jane	(United Kingdom of Great Britain and Ireland) New South Wales	The schooner ran aground on a reef at the entrance to the South Harbour, Isle of Pines, New Caledonia in late May. She was on a voyage from Rotuma, Fiji Islands to Sydney.
Ariadne	United States	The ship was abandoned in the Indian Ocean before 10 May. Her crew were rescued by Arabia (United States).
Arthur Watson	United Kingdom	The ship was driven ashore at Bic, Province of Canada, British North America before 15 May.
Australië	Netherlands	The full-rigged ship was wrecked on the Shipwash Sand, in the North Sea off the coast of Suffolk, United Kingdom.
Boberach	France	The yacht was driven ashore at La Calle, Algeria before 28 May. Her 28 crew were rescued.
Claire-Fanny	France	The ship was wrecked on the coast of Algeria before 28 May.
Countess of London	United Kingdom	The ship was driven ashore and severely damaged on White Island, in the Saint Lawrence River before 18 May.
Defence	United Kingdom	The full-rigged ship was driven ashore and wrecked between Boscastle and Bude, Cornwall. Her crew were rescued by the Coast Guard.
Ettore	Papal States	The brig foundered off Cariati, Kingdom of the two Sicilies before 27 May.
Fortunatus	Prussia	The barque was driven ashore on Caribou Island, in Lake Michigan, before 20 May.
Huntsville	United States	The steamship sank in the Mississippi River.
Lemuel	United Kingdom	The ship was driven ashore at Hela, Prussia. She was refloated on 6 May.
Melville	United Kingdom	The brig was wrecked on Terschelling, Friesland, Netherlands. She was on a voyage from Sunderland, County Durham to Hamburg.
Napoleon III	France	The whaler was crushe by ice and sank in the Arctic Ocean. Her crew were rescued.
Neargard	United Kingdom	The ship was driven ashore on White Island, in the Saint Lawrence River before 18 May.
Nicaragua	United Kingdom	The ship ran aground on the White Island Reef. She was on a voyage from Newport, Monmouthshire to Quebec City, Province of Canada, British North America.
Perseverance	France	The brig was driven ashore at La Calle before 28 May.
Pride of Canada	United Kingdom	The ship was driven ashore on Red Island, Newfoundland, British North America before 8 May with the loss of thirteen of her crew. She was on a voyage from Liverpool, Lancashire to Quebec City. Pride of Canada was refloated on 12 June and towed in to Quebec City.
Riverdale	United Kingdom	The ship was driven ashore on Green Island, British North America before 20 May and became severely hogged. She was on a voyage from the Clyde to Quebec City. Perseverance was later refloated and taken in to Quebec City, arriving on 2 July. She was consequently condemned.
Robert A. Lewis	United States	The ship was wrecked at Jonesport, Maine before 14 May. She was on a voyage from Liverpool to Saint John, New Brunswick, British North America.
Palmyra	United Kingdom	The ship was wrecked in Indian waters before 19 May.
Racketen	Norway	The sloop was lost near Tromsø.
Runcina	United Kingdom	The schooner sank in the North Sea. Her crew were rescued. She was on a voyage from Newcastle upon Tyne to Itzehoe, Duchy of Holstein.
Samuel	United Kingdom	The ship ran aground on the Heisterwent, in the Baltic Sea. She was on a voyage from Danzig to London. She was later refloated and resumed her voyage.
