= Zephyr (1796 ship) =

British merchant ship (1796–1808) and whaler (1810–1837)

History

Great Britain
- Name: Zephyr
- Launched: 1796, Thorne, South Yorkshire
- Fate: Last listed in 1853

General characteristics
- Tons burthen: 342 (bm)
- Complement: 49 (1835)
- Armament: 1797: 6 × 4-pounder guns; 1800: 2 × 6-pounder + 4 × 4-pounder guns; 1810: 8 × 18-pounder carronades

Zephyr was a vessel built at Hull in 1796. She initially traded with the Baltic, though for a year or so she was a London-based transport. From 1810 she made 27 voyages as a whaler in the northern whale fishery. She returned to mercantile trade and was last listed in 1853.

== Career ==
Zephyr first appeared in Lloyd's Register (LR) in the volume for 1796.

Year	Master	Owner	Trade	Source & notes
1796	Jn.Ward	T.Ward	Hull–Petersburg	LR
1799	J.Ward	T.Ward	Hull–Petersburg; London transport	LR
1801	J.Ward; W.Brown	T.Ward	London transport London–Petersburg	LR

Zephyr was absent from the 1809 volume of Lloyd's Register. She reappeared in the 1810 volume with a new owner and new trade, that of a northern whaler.

Year	Master	Owner	Trade	Source & notes
1810	J.Bell	Raines	Hull–Greenland	LR; good repair 1810

The data below is from Coltish, augmented with press reports. On occasion, after the whaling season (April to September), Zephyr traded with the Baltic.

Year	Master	Where	Whales	Tuns whale oil
!810	Bell	Greenland	12	130
1811	Bell	Greenland	5	75
1812	Bell	Greenland	20	155
1813	Bell	Greenland	6	78
1814	Bell	Greenland	18	167
1815	Bell	Greenland	1	19

In 1815 Captain Unthank purchased Zephyr.

Year	Master	Owner	Trade	Source & notes
1815	J.Bell; J.Unthank	Raines & Co.	Hull–Greenland	LR; good repair 1810, damages repaired 1814, & large repair 1815

Year	Master	Where	Whales	Tuns whale oil
1816	Bell	Davis Strait	11	163
1817	Unthank	Davis Strait	6	72
1818	Unthank	Davis Strait	4	55
1819	Unthank	Davis Strait	3	34
1820	Unthank	Davis Strait	11	140
1821	Unthank	Greenland	19	214
1822	Unthank	Greenland	7	93
1823	Unthank	Greenland	26	195
1824	Unthank	Davis Strait	6	80
1825	Unthank	Davis Strait	4	55
1826	Unthank	Davis Strait	5	71
1827	Ash	Davis Strait	12	210
1828	Ash	Davis Strait	19	221
1829	Ash	Davis Strait	14	146
1830	Ash	Davis Strait	5	76

On 2 July 1830 the whaler William became trapped in ice at Davis Strait, leading her crew to abandon her and join other whaling vessels in the area. The crews of Zephyr and Traveller worked for 48 hours to clear her of ice. They then set fire to the upper part of William, lightening her and causing her to rise. When she rose to the point that the beams above the casks of blubber she had collected were exposed, they set fire to them too. When the casks appeared, the crews put out the fire. When William's master would not sign over her blubber and whale fins to the crews, Zephyr sailed away. Traveller took on 70 butts of blubber and one ton of whale fins. Captain Simpson took them back with him and sold them, keeping the proceeds for himself and his men. William's owners sued for the proceeds, but Simpson argued that it was a long-standing custom of the whaling trade that salvaged cargo belonged to the men who had salvaged it. The jury found for the plaintiffs, who had estimated the value of the lost whale products at £500, and awarded them £392. Although all but one witness, all of whom were masters of whaling ships, testified for the defendant, the jury found for the plaintiff.

Year	Master	Where	Whales	Tuns whale oil
1831	Ash	Davis Strait	7	70
1832	Ash	Davis Strait	29	231
1833	Ash	Davis Strait	19	148
1834	Ash	Davis Strait	16	168
1835	Ash	Davis Strait	4	120 butts (Note: The four whales yielded 40 tons of train oil and two tons of "fins".)
1836	Ash	Davis Strait	0	0
1837	Ash	Greenland	0	0

Zephyr was not listed in 1837, and the relevant page is missing from the volume for 1838. Zephyr reappeared in the volume for 1839. Lloyd's Register gave her owner as Stock & Co. John Unthank, Benjamin Stocks (merchant of Cottingham), and Thomas Shackles (oil merchant of Hull) were partners.

Year	Master	Owner	Trade	Source & notes
1839	T.Magens	Stock & Co.	Hull–America	LR; small repair 1838, damages repaired 1839; "wants repair"
1844	T.Magens; Brumell	Stock & Co. Gibson	Hull–America; London collier	LR; small repair 1838, damages repaired 1839
1845	Brumell; W.Sadler	Gibson	London collier	LR; small repair 1838, damages repaired 1839 & 1845

In 1845 her owners sold her to London owners and her homeport changed from Hull to London. A few years later the London owners sold Zephyr to owners that sailed her between Stockton and Canada.

Year	Master	Owner	Trade	Source & notes
1850	A.Watt	Faucus	Stockton–Quebec	LR; small repairs 1849 & large repairs 1850

== Fate ==
Zephyr was last listed in the 1853 volume of Lloyd's Register, without a trade.
