= William (1811 ship) =

UK whaler (1811–1830

History

United Kingdom
- Name: William
- Launched: 1811, Kingston upon Hull
- Fate: Wrecked 2 July 1830

General characteristics
- Tons burthen: 350 (bm)
- Armament: 8 × 9-pounder carronades

William was launched at Kingston upon Hull in 1811. She made 19 complete voyages to Davis Strait and Greenland in the British northern whale fishery, but was lost to ice on her 20th. Her loss gave rise to an interesting case in claims for salvage.

== Career ==
William first appeared in Lloyd's Register (LR) in the volume for 1811.

Year	Master	Owner	Trade	Source & notes
1811	T.Orton	Marshall	Hull–Davis Strait	LR
1812	T.Orton; Kelah	Marshall	Hull–Davis Strait	LR

The whaling data below is from Coltish, augmented with press reports.

Year	Master	Where	Whales	Tuns whale oil
1811	[Andrew Marvel] Orton	Davis Strait	12	174
1812	[Robert] Keilah	Davis Strait	17	235
1813	Keilah	Greenland	19	162
1814	[James] Gawthorpe	Greenland	16	141
1815	Gawthorpe	Greenland	4	70
1816	Gawthorpe	Greenland	5	62
1817	Gawthorpe	Davis Strait	8	86
1818	[John] Barchard	Davis Strait	8	94
1819	Barchard	Davis Strait	0	0

Year	Master	Owner	Trade	Source & notes
1820	Barchard; Hawkins	Coopers	Hull–Davis Strait	LR; repairs 1819 & thorough repair 1820

Year	Master	Where	Whales	Tuns whale oil
1820	[Thomas] Hawkins	Davis Strait	18	245
1821	Hawkins	Greenland	12	129
1822	Hawkins	Davis Strait	3	40
1823	Hawkins	Davis Strait	32	260
1824	Hawkins	Davis Strait	9	100
1825	Hawkins	Davis Strait	2	23
1826	Hawkins	Davis Strait	7	102
1827	Hawkins	Davis Strait	n/a	52
1828	[William] North	Davis Strait	14	188
1829	North	Davis Strait	8	112
1830	North	Davis Strait	0	0

== Fate ==
On 2 July 1830 William became trapped in ice at Davis Strait, leading her crew to abandon her and join other whaling vessels in the area. The crews of Traveller and Zephyr worked for 48 hours to clear her of ice. They then set fire to the upper part of William, lightening her and causing her to rise. When she rose to the point that the beams above the casks of blubber she had collected were exposed, they set fire to them too. When the casks appeared, the crews put out the fire. When William's master would not sign over her blubber and whale fins to the crews, Zephyr sailed away. Traveller took on 70 butts of blubber and one ton of whale fins. Captain George Simpson took them back with him and sold them, keeping the proceeds for himself and his men. William's owners sued for the proceeds, but Simpson argued that it was a long-standing custom of the whaling trade that salvaged cargo belonged to the men who had salvaged it. The jury found for the plaintiffs, who had estimated the value of the lost whale products at £500, and awarded them £392. Although all but one witness, all of whom were masters of whaling ships, testified for the defendant, the jury found for the plaintiff.

Captain William North died a few days after the loss of William, and so was not in a position to testify in the case.
