= Pickton =

Pickton may refer to:

- Robert Pickton (1949–2024), Canadian pig farmer and serial killer
- Steve Pickton, British electronic-techno musician, producer and sound engineer
- Pickton, Texas, an unincorporated community in Hopkins County, Texas

== See also ==
- Picton (disambiguation)
