= Woodford (1815 ship) =

History

United Kingdom
- Name: Woodford
- Owner: 1817: Chapman & Co.; 185: Fletcher & Co.; 1834: John Lawson, Whitby
- Builder: Fishburn & Broderick, Whitby
- Launched: 7 June 1815
- Fate: Wrecked 22 November 1837

General characteristics
- Tons burthen: 373, or 37353/94, or 374, or 378 (bm)

Woodford was launched in 1815 at Whitby as a West Indiaman. Between 1816 and 1817 she made two voyages to the Indian Ocean or the East Indies, sailing under a license from the British East India Company (EIC). She was wrecked at Laeso in November 1837.

== Career ==
Woodford first appeared in Lloyd's Register (LR) in 1815 with Brady, master, Chapman, owner, and trade London–West Indies.

Still, in 1813 the EIC had lost its monopoly on the trade between India and Britain. British ships were then free to sail to India or the Indian Ocean under a license from the EIC. Woodford's owners applied on 1 December 1815 for a licence, which they received three days later.

On 23 December 1815 Woodford, Brady, master, arrived at Portsmouth, from London, bound for the Cape of Good Hope and Isle of France (Mauritius). on 22 April 1816 she sailed from the Cape for Mauritius. From Mauritius Woodford sailed to Batavia She was there on 3 September, shortly after the Dutch had resumed control of the Dutch East Indies. By 3 and 4 January Woodford, Brady, master, was back in England in the Downs where the gales of those dates caught her, costing her her anchor and cables. By 14 January she was at Gravesend.

Woodford sailed to Mauritius a second time. On 30 November 1817 Woodford, Brady, master, arrived at Hull, having left Isle of France on 23 August, and Saint Helena on 9 October. She arrived at Gravesend on 2 December.

Year	Master	Owner	Trade	Source & notes
1820	Eltringham	Chapman	London–Jamaica	LR
1825	Lamborn	Fletcher & Co.	London–Jamaica	LR
1830	Last	Fletcher & Co.	London–Jamaica	LR; small repairs 1826
1837	Sanderson	Lawson & Co.	London–Quebec	LR; large repair 1835

In May 1835 Woodford underwent repairs at the dock of Henry and George Barrick, Whitby. She was then surveyed on 13 May.

== Fate ==
Woodford, Sanderson (or Saunderson), master, was driven ashore on Læsø on 22 November 1837 and wrecked; her crew were rescued. She was on a voyage from Riga to Plymouth.
