= Jamsetjee Bomanjee Wadia =

Indian Shipbuilder

- Born: c. 1754
- Died: 1821
- Occupation: Shipbuilder

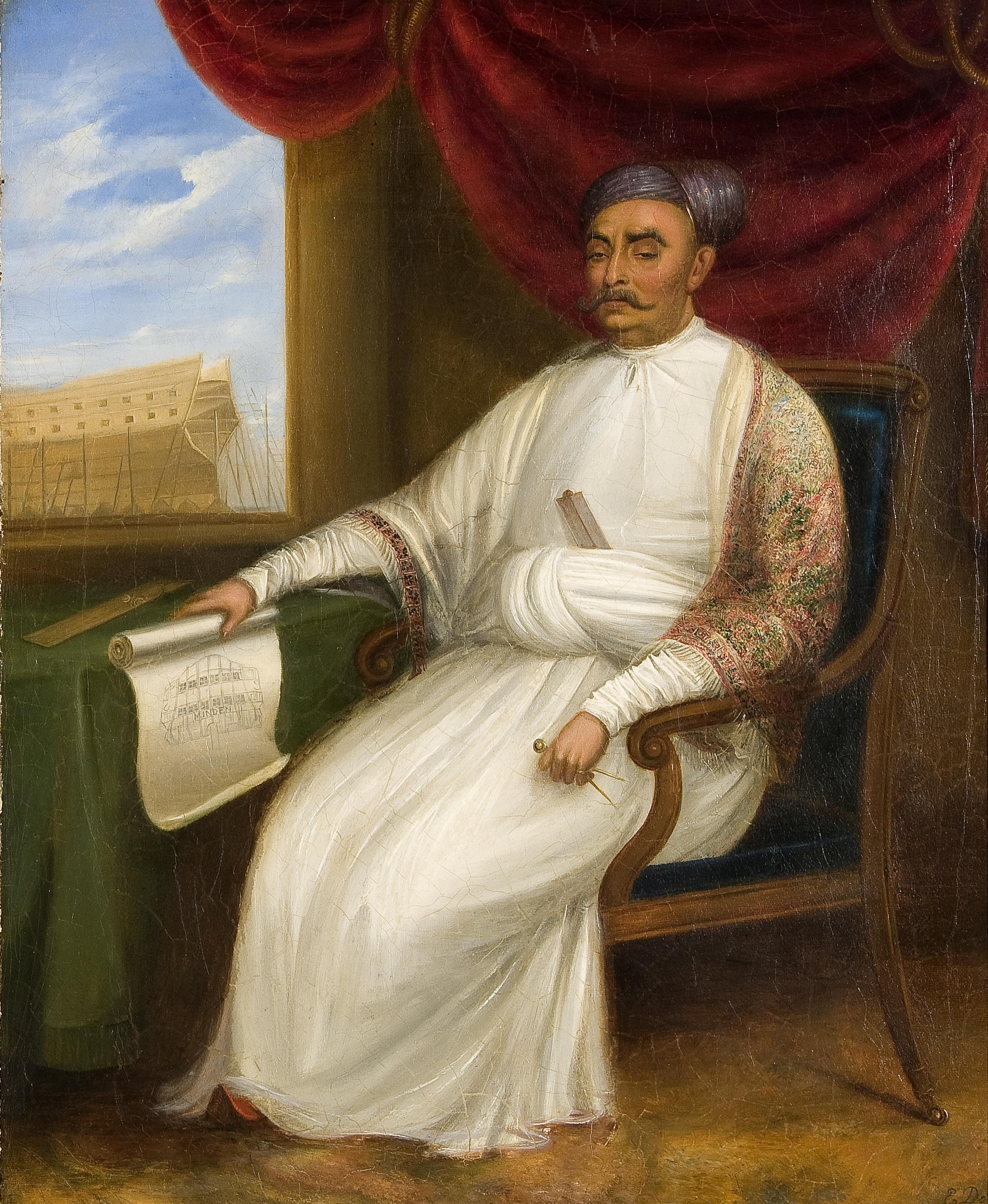
Jamsetjee Bomanjee Wadia, Parsi master shipbuilder

Jamsetjee Bomanjee Wadia (c. 1754–1821) was an Indian shipbuilder and member of the Wadia family.
