= Zenobia (1815 ship) =

1815 ship

History

United Kingdom
- Name: Zenobia
- Namesake: Zenobia, the queen of the Palmyrene Empire who conquered Egypt
- Owner: 1829: Captain Joseph Douglas, owner and master; 1835: J. Owen & Co.; 1852: P&O
- Builder: Matthew Smith, Howrah, Calcutta, India
- Launched: 5 October 1815
- Completed: 1815
- Fate: Broken up 1871

General characteristics
- Tons burthen: 510, or 537, or 549, or 581, or 588, or 602
- Length: 129 ft 4 in (39.4 m)
- Beam: 32 ft 0 in (9.8 m)
- Notes: Teak-built

Zenobia was a merchant ship launched in 1815 at Calcutta, India. She traded with India under license from the British East India Company (EIC), and made one voyage for the EIC. She then became a Free Trader (i.e., no longer required a license). In 1852 the P&O company purchased Zenobia to use her as a coal hulk. She was broken up in 1871.

== Career ==
Zenobia first appears in Lloyd's Register in 1816 as a one-year-old ship. G. Pelly is her master and owner, and her trade is London—India.

Year	Master	Owner	Trade
1820	G. Pelly	Captain	London—India
1825	G. Pelly	Captain	London—India
1828	J. Douglas	Douglas	London—India
1830	Douglas	Douglas	London—India

On 25 August 1827 Zenobia sailed for Bengal.

Between 9 July 1829 and 14 June 1830, Zenobia made a return voyage from London to Bengal for the EIC. Lloyd's Register for 1830 shows Zenobia with Douglas as master & owner, and trade London—India.

The Indian businessman and industrialist Dwarkanath Tagore purchased Zenobia (or more likely a share in her), in 1833 for 55,000 rupees from the estate of James Calder after the failure of the firm Mackingtosh & Co.

Year	Master	Owner	Trade
1833	Owen	Douglas & Co.	London—Calcutta
1834			Not registered
1835	J. Owen	Captain & Co.	London—Calcutta; London—India

In August 1835 Zenobia was sold to J. Owen & Co. The following advertisement soliciting outbound passengers from England appeared in "The Indian Mail" in 1843:

For CALCUTTA, calling at MADRAS, to land Passengers only, the Teak Ship ZENOBIA, 600 Tons, S.H. Owen, Commander. To leave the St. Catherine Docks the 15th December, calling at Portsmouth to embark Passengers. — For Freight or Passage, apply to Messrs. BARING, BROTHERS, and Co., S. Bishopsgate Street; or to JAMES BARBER and Co., 17, St. Mary Ave.

In 1852 the Peninsular & Oriental Steam Navigation Co. (P&O) purchased Zenobia to use her as a hulk. Zenobia is last listed in Lloyd's Register (1852) with Saxon, owner and master, and no trade.

== Fate ==
In 1871, Zenobia was sold for breaking up.

== See also ==
- Dwarkanath Tagore
