= Princess Charlotte (1815 ship) =

UK merchant ship 1815-1843

History

United Kingdom
- Name: Princess Charlotte
- Builder: Thomas Brocklebank, Whitehaven
- Launched: 1815
- Fate: Last mentioned 1843

General characteristics
- Tons burthen: 514, or 517 (bm)
- Armament: 22 guns

Princess Charlotte was launched in 1815 at Whitehaven. She made several voyages to India, sailing under a license issued by the British East India Company (EIC). She was last listed in 1841, though she apparently sailed for at least another two years.

== Career ==
The Brocklebanks, owners of Princess Charlotte, built her at their yard in Whitehaven to respond to the challenge posed by Kingsmill in the newly opened trade between the United Kingdom and India. She was almost the same size as Kingsmill.

In 1813 the EIC had lost its monopoly on the trade between India and Britain. British ships were then free to sail to India or the Indian Ocean under a license from the EIC. Princess Charlotte's owners applied on 4 January 1816, for a licence, which they received the next day.

Princess Charlotte first appeared in Lloyd's Register (LR) in 1815.

Year	Master	Owner	Trade	Source & notes
1815		Brocklebank	Workington	LR
1816	M'Kean	Brocklebank	Workington; Whitehaven–West Indies	LR
1818	M'Kean	Brocklebank	Whitehaven–West Indies; Liverpool–Calcutta	LR

Princess Charlotte was registered at Whitehaven on 11 January 1816. Captain J.M'Kean sailed on 8 February 1816 from London, bound for Bombay. She returned on 24 March 1818. Her cargo was worth £28,000, which yielded a net profit to her owners of £10,651.

Thereafter she made several voyages to India and Penang. On 1 September 1824 she put back to Calcutta to repair, after having sailed for Liverpool.

Year	Master	Owner	Trade	Source & notes
1827	M'Kean	Brocklebank	Liverpool–Calcutta; Liverpool–New Orleans	Register of Shipping
1828	J.M'Kean; Johnstone	Brocklebank	Liverpool–New Orleans	LR
1829	Johnston; J.M'Kean	Brocklebank	Liverpool–New Orleans	LR; repairs 1829
1830	A.Kerr	Brocklebank	Liverpool–Calcutta	LR; large repair 1829
1835	J.M'Kean			LR
1841	M.King	Brocklebank	Liverpool–Bombay	LR

== Fate ==
Princess Charlotte, King, master, was last listed in Lloyd's Register in 1841. However, she was reported to have sailed from St Helena on 28 July 1843, having come from Bombay on her way to Liverpool. She arrived at Liverpool on 21 September. She may have sailed again, but absent original research her ultimate fate is unclear.
