= Agincourt (1825 ship) =

History

United Kingdom
- Name: Agincourt
- Namesake: Battle of Agincourt
- Owner: Charles Pinney and Robert Edward Case
- Builder: Monmouth
- Launched: 1825
- Fate: Wrecked January 1829

General characteristics
- Tons burthen: 299, or 2991/94 (bm)
- Length: 102 ft 1 in (31.1 m)
- Beam: 28 ft 8 in (8.7 m)
- Sail plan: Ship
- Notes: Two decks and three masts

Agincourt was launched at Monmouth in 1825, registered at Bristol, and became a West Indiaman sailing to Nevis. She was lost on 29 January 1829.

Agincourt first appeared in Lloyd's Register in 1826 with C. Claxton, master, Pinneys, owner, and trade Bristol–Nevis. Lloyd's Register for 1829 showed Agincourt's master changing from William Scarth to Joseph Essex Harris.

Agincourt was on her way to Nevis when she ran on a reef at Antigua on 29 January 1829. Her cargo was lost but her crew was saved.
