= Melpomene (1815 ship) =

History

United Kingdom
- Name: Melpomene
- Namesake: Melpomene
- Builder: Joseph Wales & George Dobson, King's Lynn
- Launched: 18 November 1815
- Fate: Abandoned 27 April 1833

General characteristics
- Tons burthen: Originally: 306, or 30649/94, or 307 (bm); Lengthened: 361, or 365 (bm)

Melpomene was launched in 1815 at King's Lynn. She traded with North America, the West Indies, the East Indies, and South American. She was wrecked in 1833 while in the North Atlantic, forcing her crew to abandon her.

== Career ==
Melpomene first appeared in Lloyd's Register (LR) with Vidal, owner, and trade Lynn–London. It did not gave the name of her owner, noting only that she was owned in London. Her next voyage was to Philadelphia.

In 1813 the British East India Company (EIC) had lost its monopoly on the trade between Britain and India. British ships were then free to sail to India, the Indian Ocean, or the East Indies under a license from the EIC.

Year	Master	Owner	Trade	Source
1820	Watts	Johnson	London–Batavia	LR;
1825	Barclay	Johnson	London–Jamaica	LR; lengthened 1818
1830	Johnson; T.Berridge	Johnson	London–Montevideo	LR; lengthened 1818, and thorough repair 1829
1833	Beveridge	Morrison	Greenock–Quebec	LR; lengthened 1818, and thorough repair 1829

== Fate ==
Heavy seas took Melpomene's mast and caused extensive damage on 24 April 1833 as Melpomene was on a voyage from the Clyde to Quebec City. Her crew abandoned her three days later; Isabella rescued them.
