= Waterloo (1815 Sunderland ship) =

Ship wrecked at Fish Hoek in 1821

History

United Kingdom
- Name: Waterloo
- Namesake: Battle of Waterloo
- Launched: 1815, Sunderland
- Fate: Wrecked 25 October 1821

General characteristics
- Tons burthen: 215 (bm)

Waterloo was launched in 1815, at Sunderland. She traded with Hamburg, Trieste, and Tobago, before sailing to the Cape of Good Hope with emigrants. She was lost at Fish Hoek on 25 October 1821; the wreckage and cargo was sold there on 6 November.

== Career ==
Waterloo first appeared in Lloyd's Register (LR) in 1815, with J. Hann, master, Grenville, owner, and trade London–Hambro.

On 25 May 1817, Waterloo, Hann, master, arrived at Trieste from London. On 28 October, she arrived at Barcelona from Odessa.

Year	Master	Owner	Trade	Source
1818	Hann; J.Pratt	Greenwell	London–Trieste; London–Havana	LR
1820	Proom; I.Leland	Grenville	London–Tobago; London–CGH.	LR

LR for 1822, showed Waterloo with D[avid] [Thomson] Lyon, master, J&P Nichols, owners, and trade London–CGH.

On 9 February 1821, Waterloo, Lyon, master, sailed from Portsmouth for the Cape. She was carrying 61 settlers under the auspices of the Government Settler Scheme. (Twenty eight vessels left that year and the next with settlers for South Africa.) She arrived at the Cape on 24 May.

== Fate ==
On 25 October 1821, Waterloo, Lyon, master, was driven ashore at Fish Hook Bay, Cape of Good Hope. The next day she was a total wreck. Her crew were rescued. She was carrying whale oil, some of which was also saved.

At the time, there was a whale oil factory at Fish Hoek (or Visch Hoek). After she wrecked, an auction occurred on the beach of what was left of the cargo she had been loading and of her masts, rigging, and whatever else was left. Early in November, the Cape Town Gazette and African Adviser published a notice that on 6 November, there would be a sale on the beach at Fisch Hoek Bay of Waterloo's masts, yards, sails, rigging, boat, provisions, furniture, material and damaged cargo saved from the wreck, as well as her anchors and cables, and that part of her cargo that had not been recovered.

The remains of the wreck now lie in some seven meters of water.

One source assigns this Waterloo's fate to a different Waterloo.

== See also ==
- Shipwrecks of Cape Town
