= Waterloo (1815 New Brunswick ship) =

History

United Kingdom
- Name: Waterloo
- Namesake: Battle of Waterloo
- Builder: St Martin's, New Brunswick
- Launched: 1815
- Fate: Last listed 1848

General characteristics
- Tons burthen: 391, or 392 (bm)
- Length: 113 ft 6 in (34.6 m)
- Beam: 28 ft 1 in (8.6 m)
- Propulsion: Sail

Waterloo was launched in 1815 at St Martin's, New Brunswick. She was registered at Saint John, New Brunswick in 1825, but then sold at Newcastle in 1826. After her launch she started trading between England and what is now Canada.

Waterloo first appeared in Lloyd's Register in 1816 C.Ward, master, changing to Blakeston, J.Ward & Co., owners, and trade New Brunswick–Liverpool. She spent most of career sailing between England and North America, particularly Canada. She was last listed in 1848.

| Year | Master | Owner | Trade | Source & notes |
|---|---|---|---|---|
| 1820 | A.Scott; C.Ward | J. Ward & Co. | Liverpool–New Brunswick | Lloyd's Register (LR) |
| 1825 | W.Dudne | J. Ward & Co. | Liverpool–New Brunswick | LR |
| 1830 | J.Rayne | Captain & Co. | Belfast | LR; small repairs 1830 |
| 1835 | B.Frost | | Hull–America | LR; homeport of Hull; small repairs 1834 & 1835 |
| 1840 | Roberts; R.Predgen | R.&J.Gill | Hull–Quebec | LR; homeport of Hull; small repairs 1835 & 1837 |
| 1845 | Roberts | R.& J.Gill | Hull–Africa | LR; homeport of Hull; small repairs 1835, 1837, and 1844 |
| 1848 | Roberts | | | LR |
