= Traveller (1815 ship) =

UK merchant ship and whaler (1815-1858)

History

United Kingdom
- Name: Traveller
- Launched: 1815, Peterhead
- Fate: Wrecked 2 May 1858

General characteristics
- Tons burthen: 402 (bm)

Traveller was launched at Peterhead in 1815. She made three voyages to India, sailing under a licence from the British East India Company (EIC), and then from 1821 to 1858 she was a whaler and sealer in the British northern whale fishery. She was wrecked on 2 May 1858.

== Career ==
Traveller first appeared in the Register of Shipping (RS) in the volume for 1815. (Note: Lloyd's Register did not carry Traveller until 1818, wrongly giving her a launch year of 1817.)

Year	Master	Owner	Trade	Source
1815	Duthie	Hutchinson	London	RS

On 25 June 1815, Traveller, Douchy, master, was at Archangel. Traveller, Dutcher, master, arrived at Gravesend on 31 August, from Archangel. On 23 May 1816, Traveller, Duthie, master, arrived at Petersburg from London. She returned to Gravesend on 19 August.

In 1813 the EIC had lost its monopoly on the trade between India and Britain. British ships were then free to sail to India or the Indian Ocean under a licence from the EIC.

Year	Master	Owner	Trade	Source
1818	Hutchinson	Hutchinson	London–Bombay	RS

On 28 April 1817, Traveller, Hutchinson, master, sailed from Gravesend for Bombay, sailing under a licence from the EIC. On 6 February 1818 she was at the Cape of Good Hope, having arrived there from Penang; on 10 March she was off Ascension. On 4 May she reached Dartmouth and on 7 May she arrived at Gravesend.

On 26 September 1818 Traveller, Hutchinson, master, sailed from Gravesend, bound for Bombay. She sailed from Bombay on 7 March 1819 and was off The Start on 7 August 1819.

On 12 November 1819 Traveller, Hutchinson, master, sailed from Gravesend, bound for Bombay.

On 19 September 1820 Traveller, Hutchinson, master, arrived at Gravesend, having left Bombay on 1 May.

Year	Master	Owner	Trade	Source
1821	Hutchinson	Hutchinson	London–Bombay; London–Greenland	RS

Traveller became a whaler, operating out of Peterhead. Having left for Greenland from London she returned to Peterhead in autumn 1821.

Almost all the tabular data below is from the Scottish Arctic Whaling Database. (Note: When there is no data on the number of seals taken the reason is that on that voyage Traveller engaged only in whaling. The seal hunting took place in the East Greenland fishery, and not in Davis Strait.) The data for 1843 is from Sutherland.

Year	Master	Where	Whales	Tuns whale oil
1821	Hutchinson	Davis Strait	18	218
1822	Hutchinson	Davis Strait	2	21
1823	Hutchinson	Davis Strait	26	262
1824	Hutchinson	Davis Strait	5	67
1825	Hutchinson	Davis Strait	6	65
1826	Simpson	Davis Strait	13	150
1827	Simpson	Davis Strait	27.5	282
1828	Simpson	Davis Strait	19	240
1829	Simpson	Davis Strait	17	171
1830	Simpson	Davis Strait	7	110

On 2 July 1830 the whaler William became trapped in ice at Davis Strait, leading her crew to abandon her and join other whaling vessels in the area. The crews of Traveller and Zephyr worked for 48 hours to clear her of ice. They then set fire to the upper part of William, lightening her and causing her to rise. When she rose to the point that the beams above the casks of blubber she had collected were exposed, they set fire to them too. When the casks appeared, the crews put out the fire. When William's master would not sign over her blubber and whale fins to the crews, Zephyr sailed away. Traveller took on 70 butts of blubber and one ton of whale fins. Captain Simpson took them back with him and sold them, keeping the proceeds for himself and his men. William's owners sued for the proceeds, but Simpson argued that it was a long-standing custom of the whaling trade that salvaged cargo belonged to the men who had salvaged it. The jury found for the plaintiffs, who had estimated the value of the lost whale products at £500, and awarded them £392. Although all but one witness, all of whom were masters of whaling ships, testified for the defendant, the jury found for the plaintiff.

Year	Master	Where	Whales	Tuns whale oil	Seals
1831	Simpson	Davis Strait	4	54	
1832	Simpson	Davis Strait	38	273	
1833	Simpson	Davis Strait	22	115	
1834	Simpson	Davis Strait	16	230	
1835	Simpson	Davis Strait	8	88	
1836	Simpson	Davis Strait	0	0	
1837	Simpson	Davis Strait	2		
1838	Simpson	Davis Strait	14	183	
1839	Simpson	East Greenland	4	39	117
1840	Simpson	Davis Strait	0	0	
1841	Simpson	East Greenland	2	50	2800
1842	Simpson	East Greenland		2	250
1843	Lee	Greenland	0	0	
1844	Simpson	Davis Strait	6	63	
1845	Simpson	Davis Strait	27	172	
1846	Simpson	Davis Strait	3	46	
1847	Simpson	Davis Strait	3	39	
1848	A.Ogston	East Greenland		99	12,678
1849	A.Ogston	East Greenland		15	1,320
1850	A.Hutchinson	East Greenland	4	63	563
1851	A.Hutchinson	East Greenland	2	121 (est.)	10,133
1852	A.Hutchinson	East Greenland	7	62 + 23 (seal oil)	1,078
1853	A.Hutchinson	East Greenland	5	50 + 70 (seal oil)	5,944
1855–1856	G.Brown	East Greenland (Note: Traveller sailed on to Cumberland Gulf to overwinter there.)	0	120 (seal oil)	10,225
1857-1858	G.Brown	East Greenland		28 (seal oil)	2754

Over her career Traveller gathered 3568–3858 tons of oil. The value was around £200,000.

== Fate ==
From 1854, Traveller joined Captain William Penny (Lady Franklin), in opening up over-wintering and land station-based whaling in Cumberland Gulf.

Traveller was driven ashore by ice and wrecked on 2 May 1858 in Frobisher Bay. She fell on her side and a heavy piece of ice pressed down on her. Some provisions and other articles were recovered.

Gem and Jackall rescued her crew.
