= Waterloo (1815 Plymouth ship) =

History

United Kingdom
- Name: Waterloo
- Namesake: Battle of Waterloo
- Builder: Plymouth
- Launched: 23 June 1815 by the Executors of Peter Blackburn
- Fate: Abandoned in the North Atlantic on 30 October 1820

General characteristics
- Tons burthen: 362, or 36282/94, or 372 (bm)

Waterloo was launched in 1815 at Plymouth. She made two voyages to India. Heavy seas in October 1820 so damaged her that her crew had to abandon her in the North Atlantic.

== Career ==
Waterloo first appeared in Lloyd's Register (LR) in 1815 with Rutledge, owner and master, and trade Plymouth–London.

In 1813 the EIC had lost its monopoly on the trade between India and Britain. British ships were then free to sail to India or the Indian Ocean under a license from the EIC.

Captain J. Burney sailed for Fort William, India in April 1817. On 1 April she was at Portsmouth. On 23 August she arrived at Madras. On 24 February 1818 she returned to Deal from Bengal and Madras.

LR for 1818 showed Waterloo with J. Burney, master, P.Grant, owner, and trade London–Île de France.

Captain J. Hepburne sailed from London for Fort William on 24 May 1818. A later report had her sailing to Madras. On 18 September 1818 Waterloo, Hepburn, master, was reported to have arrived at the Sunda Strait from London. On 30 September 1819 Waterloo arrived at Liverpool from Madras.

The Register of Shipping for 1820 showed Waterloo with Hepburn, master, Grant & Co., owners, and trade London–India. LR for 1820, however, showed her master changing from J.Burney to W.Martin, and her trade from London–Île de France to Liverpool–New Orleans.

LR for 1822, with stale data, showed Waterloo with W. Martin, master, Duff & Co., owners, and trade Liverpool–New Brunswick.

== Fate ==
On 24 October 1820 Waterloo, Martin, master, was on a voyage from Saint John, New Brunswick, to Liverpool when a heavy sea struck her at 46°26′N 25°0′E and carried away her lower masts and swept her deck. On the 30th three people were swept overboard and she lost her rudder. As she was now unmanageable her crew took to her boats. Merchant, an American ship from New York, rescued the survivors.

One source attributes to this Waterloo the fate of Waterloo.
