= Waterloo (1815 ship) =

Merchant ship built at Bristol, England in 1815

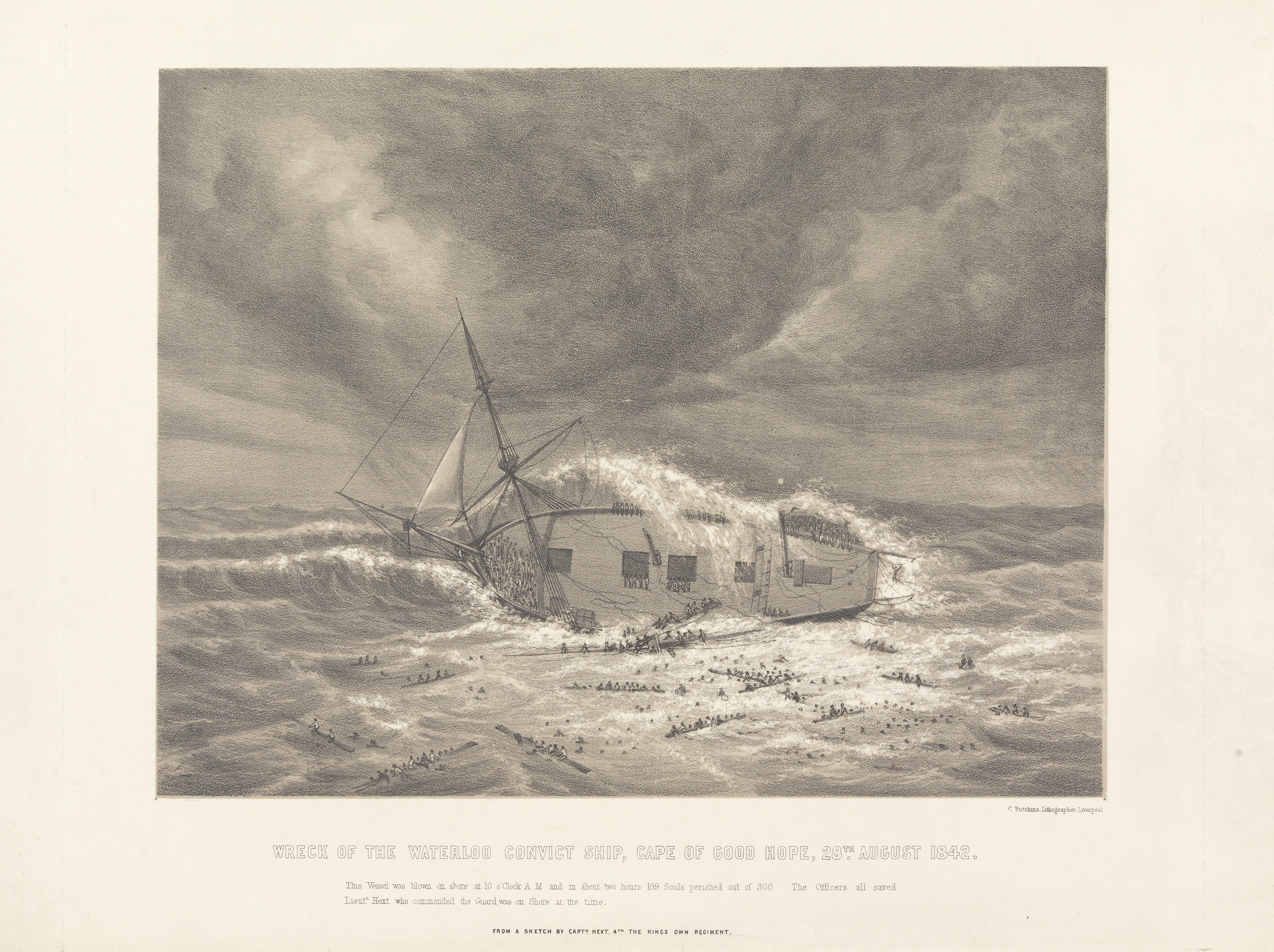
- Image by the lithographer, Charles Hutchins, after a sketch by Lieutenant Hext of The King's Own Regiment

History

United Kingdom
- Name: Waterloo
- Namesake: Battle of Waterloo
- Owner: 1815: Hillhouse, Sons, & Co.; 1818: Henry J. Moore & Co.; 1824:Brocklebank & Co.
- Builder: George Hillhouse, Sons & Co., Bristol
- Launched: 22 July 1815
- Fate: Wrecked August 1842

General characteristics
- Type: Barque
- Tons burthen: 414, or 416, or 41610/94 (bm)
- Length: 112 ft 6 in (34.3 m)
- Beam: 28 ft 7 in (8.7 m)
- Depth of hold: 7 ft 10 in (2.4 m)
- Propulsion: Sail
- Notes: Two decks & three masts

Waterloo was a merchant ship built at Bristol, England in 1815. On her first voyage she suffered a short-lived mutiny. She then made one voyage under charter to the British East India Company (EIC). She made four voyages transporting convicts from England to Australia, and two voyages from Ireland to Australia. On her seventh convict voyage Waterloo wrecked on 28 August 1842 in Table Bay with great loss of life.

== Career ==
Waterloo entered Lloyd's Registry in 1815 with James Ray, master, and trade London-Jamaica.

Mutiny: Waterloo, James Ray, master, made a voyage to Madeira and Jamaica. As she approached England on the return leg of her voyage, the mate and two crew members mutinied. They seized the captain and reportedly were preparing to slit his throat when the revenue cutter Diligence approached. She had seen that Waterloo was heading for the shore and came to investigate. Diligence's crew saved Ray and Waterloo.

On her return, her owners sold Waterloo to Henry Moor (or Moore). He then sailed her between London and Bengal under licence from the EIC.

EIC voyage: On 15 July 1820 Captain Henry Richard Wilkinson sailed from the Downs, bound for Bengal and Madras. Waterloo was at Car Nicobar by 19 November, and arrived at Calcutta on 13 December. Homeward bound, she left Calcutta on 10 February 1821. She reached Madras on 24 March, the Cape of Good Hope on 4 July, and St Helena on 25 July; she arrived at the Downs on 28 September.

Convict transport: On her first convict voyage, under the command of Stephen Addison and surgeon Michael Goodsir, she departed London on 14 March 1829 arrived in Sydney on 9 July. She had embarked 180 male convicts; there were two convict deaths en route.

For the second convict voyage, under the command of Stephen Addison and surgeon William Trotman, she departed Dublin on 18 December 1830 arrived in Sydney on 30 April 1831. She had embarked 200 male convicts and had one convict death en route.

For the third convict voyage, under the command of John Cow and surgeon John Stephenson, she departed Sheerness on 12 March 1833 and arrived in Sydney on 3 August. She embarked 214 male convicts and had eleven convict deaths en route.

On her fourth convict voyage, under the command of John Cow and surgeon George Roberts, she departed Portsmouth on 20 November 1834, arrived in Hobart Town on 3 March 1835. She embarked had 224 male convicts and had no convict deaths en route.

She made a fifth convict voyage, under the command of John Cow and surgeon George Roberts. She departed Cork, Ireland on 21 May 1836 arrived in Sydney on 6 September. She had embarked 224 male convicts and had two convict deaths en route.

On her sixth convict voyage under the command of John Cow and surgeon J. Ellis, she departed Sheerness on 4 October 1837. She arrived in Sydney on 8 February 1838. She embarked 224 male convicts and had no convict deaths en route. She had put into the Cape for refreshment between 20 and 23 December. In addition to her convicts she carried two officers and 29 soldiers, eight women, and 11 children.

== Wrecking ==
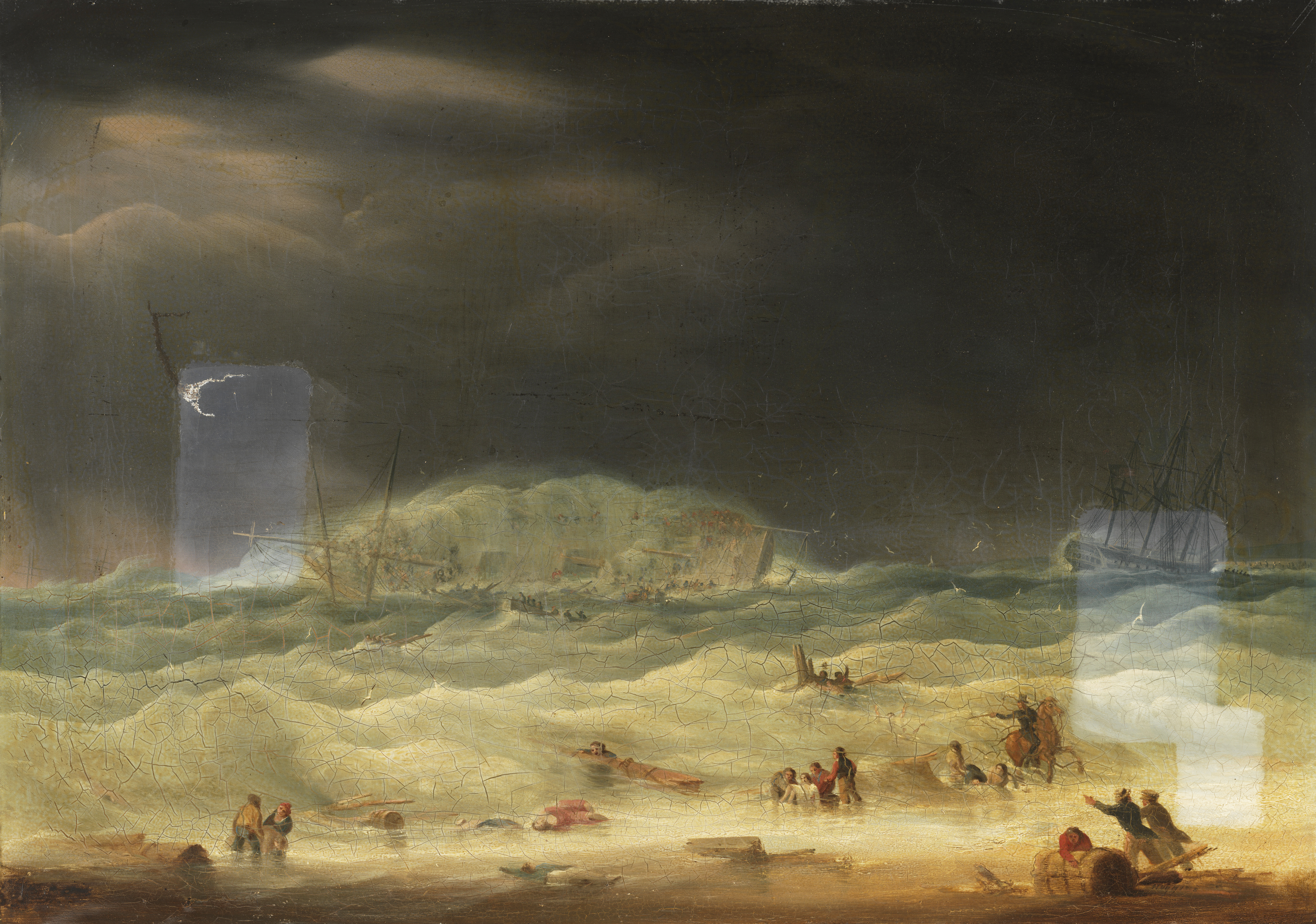
Wreck of the convict ship 'Waterloo' at Cape Town, South Africa, 1842

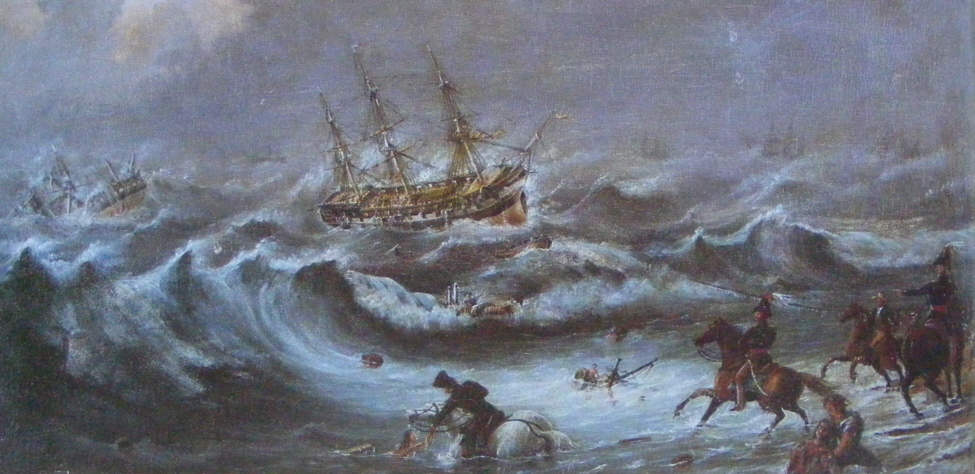
The troop carrier Abercrombie Robinson and the convict ship Waterloo aground in Table Bay on 28 August 1842

Waterloo was an old ship with unsound timbers when she sailed on her seventh voyage transporting convicts. She left Sheerness on 1 June 1842 for Van Diemen's Land. In addition to her crew, she was carrying 219 prisoners, 30 soldiers of the 99th Regiment, five women, and thirteen children.

The ship's surgeon, Dr Henry Kelsall, had persuaded Captain Henry Ager to put in at the Cape for fresh provisions, as many of those on board were suffering from scurvy. Consequently, Waterloo entered Table Bay on 24 August 1842 and anchored in a position which was to prove unsafe for that time of year. The Captain went ashore and left the ship in charge of the Chief Mate Jackson.

On 26 August, a strong northerly gale sprang up, accompanied by heavy rain. The top-gallant masts snapped and landed on the deck. On 27 August, the surgeon became extremely concerned, especially when the two anchors gave way at about 11pm. He and the Second Mate lit flares to signal their desperate situation. Early on the morning of the 28th, the wind grew to hurricane strength, and the troopship Abercrombie Robinson was driven ashore. Fearing punishment, the First Mate refused to order the cutting away of the fallen masts. Dr Kelsall ordered the freeing of the prisoners from their irons. From this point on the situation rapidly deteriorated.

Waterloo, helpless before the strong wind and high seas, was driven ashore; the masts broke and the ship heeled over on her side. Convicts leapt overboard, one of them aiding Dr Kelsall. Within two hours the ship had been reduced to fragments. In 1842, there were no lifeboats or rescue systems in place in Table Bay. Consequently, one hundred and eighty nine people died in the space of about two hours.

There were 113 survivors - 16 men of the guard, a soldier's wife (Mrs. Mulvaney), and 76 convicts. Lieutenant Hext, who commanded the guard, was on shore at the time and made a sketch of the wrecking. Captain Ager survived, as did Mr. Jackson, Chief Mate, Mr. Gunner, 2nd mate, Mr. Gill, 3rd mate, and fifteen of the crew. One hundred and eighty nine people drowned, these being 143 convicts, 15 men of the 99th Regiment, together with 17 wives and children, the boatswain Mr. Chiverton, the sailmaker, the carpenter, and 11 of the crew.

On 15 October Cape Packet took 72 of Waterloo's prisoners, plus three more from Cape Town, to Hobart. She arrived on 23 November and disembarked the prisoners. (Note: Cape Packet, of 303 or 340 tons burthen, had been built at Sunderland in 1838.)

== Inquiry ==
There was no coroner's court, so that the resultant inquiry was informal and superficial. Captain Ager was censured for remaining ashore, while the first mate was criticised for not clearing the fallen masts and rigging. The inquiry also noted that the ship's timbers were rotten and in an unseaworthy condition. An editorial in the South African Commercial Advertiser of 31 August 1842 criticised the British authorities and Waterloo's captain, stating that the weather, the water, and the bottom were not the reason for the tragedy. It went on to say:

"The Abercrombie Robinson came into the bay on the evening of the 25th, when it was dark, proceeded too far up the Bay, and came to anchor in a position unsafe for her should it come on to blow. The wind did blow a gale with squalls, and she wisely went on shore with an anchor at her bows, thereby saving some seven hundred souls, most of whom must have perished had she foundered where she rode at anchor. Had she been in a proper position she would have rode out the weather like the other vessels. Of the Waterloo it is impossible to speak with moderation. Deadly blame rests somewhere, and justice will, we have no doubt, find out the parties that deserve it."

== Similar wrecks ==
The 751-ton Dutch East Indiaman, Waddinxveen, and the Oosterland, had on 24 May 1697 been anchored in the same place near the mouth of the Salt River and been wrecked by a strong gale blowing from the same north-west direction. There were only six survivors from the Waddinxveen.
