= Waterloo (1815 Yarmouth ship) =

UK merchant ship 1815–1831

History

United Kingdom
- Name: Waterloo
- Namesake: Battle of Waterloo
- Builder: Yarmouth
- Launched: 1815
- Fate: Foundered 31 August 1833

General characteristics
- Tons burthen: 144, or 145, or 146 (bm)

Waterloo was launched in 1815 at Yarmouth. She sailed first as a West Indiaman. After a mishap in 1822 she returned to service and traded with the Mediterranean and South America. In 1824, she was the subject of a court case that her insurers suspected involved fraud. She was briefly a coaster sailing out of Lynn until she foundered in August 1833.

== Career ==
Waterloo first appeared in Lloyd's Register (LR) in 1815.

| Year | Master | Owner | Trade | Source |
|---|---|---|---|---|
| 1815 | T.Stewart; J.Coles | Preston, Jr. | Yarmouth–Straits | LR |
| 1820 | J.Coles; W.Strong | Captain & Co. | London–Havana | LR |
| 1823 | W.Strong; T.Partage | J.Cole | Cork–Jamaica; London–Hambro | LR |

On 12 September 1821 Waterloo, Strong, master, was sailing from St Ann's when she was caught in a gale. She lost 14 puncheons of rum, an anchor and cables, and a boat. Some may have been washed overboard and some jettisoned.

LL reported on 28 January 1823 that Waterloo, Partridge, master, had arrived at Savannah on 9 December 1822 from Falmouth, Jamaica. She had run aground on the Tortugas Shoals on 25 November. The Columbian armed schooner Centinella, Captain Hopner, had towed her off. Hopner put an officer and some men aboard Waterloo and they brought her into Savannah.

On 22 May 1824, in the case Jackson and others vs. Strong, the insurers brought a petition for relief, which the Admiralty Court denied. It appeared that when Waterloo ran aground some five boats of fishermen or wreckers saved her from destruction. However, the Columbian national ship Centella, Captain C.C. Hopner had arrived and Thomas Partridge turned Waterloo over to him, stating that she was too damaged and her crew too sickly, to sail her safely to England. Hopner put an officer and six men aboard Waterloo who took her into Savannah. There she was repaired and the Admiralty Court of the District awarded Hopner and his crew $12,000 for salvage. Partridge did not have the money or credit so he sold the cargo, at great loss. The insurers suspected that Partridge had conspired with Hopner to have Waterloo taken to a US port that would award excessive salvage, with Hopner providing a side payment to Partridge.

| Year | Master | Owner | Trade | Source |
|---|---|---|---|---|
| 1825 | Walker | Captain & Co. | London–Trieste | LR; damage repaired 1824 |
| 1830 | J.Walker | Captain & Co. | Liverpool–Valparaiso | LR; damage repaired 1824 |
| 1833 | J.Seals | Seals & Co. | Lynn coaster | LR; damage repaired 1824, & small repairs 1830 |

== Fate ==
Waterloo foundered on 31 August 1831 in Lynn Roads, off King's Lynn. A fishing boat rescued her crew.
