= Picton (1815 ship) =

UK merchant ship 1815–1820

History

United Kingdom
- Name: Picton
- Owner: 1815:James Martin Hilhouse, George Hilhouse, Robert Hilhouse and Josiah Gist, ship-builders, Bristol.; 1817 January 8: James Wason, William Hood and George Eveleigh Kiddell, merchants, Bristol.
- Launched: 1815
- Commissioned: 13 December 1815
- Home port: Bristol
- Fate: Wrecked January 1820

General characteristics
- Tons burthen: 23280/90 (bm)
- Length: 90 ft 10 in (27.7 m)
- Beam: 24 ft 0 in (7.3 m) (below)
- Propulsion: Sails
- Sail plan: Fully rigged ship
- Notes: Two decks & three masts

Picton was launched in 1815 at Bristol. She made three voyages to the West Indies and one to St. Petersburg. Her first master was Charles Mountstephens. She enters Lloyd's Register in 1816 with Mountstevens as master and trade London-Jamaica.

Then on 27 January 1817 John Morris replaced Mountstephens, shortly after her change of ownership. Picton, Morris, master, was outbound on a voyage to Barbados when she wrecked on Foreland Point between Minehead and Ilfracombe during a storm on 20 January 1820. Two crewmen died of exposure but a woman passenger and the rest of the crew were saved. (The same storm claimed a number of other vessels.)
