= Braddock (1815 ship) =

History

United Kingdom
- Name: Braddock
- Builder: Workington or Maryport
- Launched: 1815
- Fate: Abandoned in a sinking state on 21 January 1829

General characteristics
- Tons burthen: 270, or 272 (bm)

Braddock (or Bradock) was launched in 1815, at Workington or Maryport. She spent most of her career sailing to the United States and the West Indies. In 1828 she made a voyage to Calcutta under a license from the British East India Company (EIC). Her crew abandoned her in a sinking state on 21 January 1829, as she was returning to England from Bengal.

== Career ==
Bradock first appeared in Lloyd's Register (LR) in 1816 with Jackson, master, Bradock, owner, and trade Liverpool–Savannah.

On 21 November 1816, Braddock, Johnson, master, was on shore at the Nole, near Savannah. Braddock was on a voyage from Liverpool to Savannah.

| Year | Master | Owner | Trade | Source & notes |
|---|---|---|---|---|
| 1818 | M.Kelly | Huson | Liverpool–Jamaica | LR |
| 1823 | J.M'Master; J.Huson | Livingston | Liverpool–Havanah | LR |
| 1828 | J.Hewson | Hewson | Liverpool–Jamaica | LR; repairs 1826 |

In 1813 the EIC had lost its monopoly on the trade between India and Britain. British ships were then free to sail to India or the Indian Ocean under a license from the EIC.

== Fate ==
On 22 September 1828, Braddock sailed from Calcutta for Liverpool. On 31 January 1829 Chatham, Bragg, master, encountered Bradock at 3°18′N 24°18′W. Bradock was in a sinking state with six feet of water in her hold. Chatham took off the crew. Another report has her crew abandoning Bradock, Wyngates, master, on 21 January at 3°N 25°W. A third source has the same date and location as the previous, but adds the information that Braddock had lost her bulwarks, and that three crew members had died after their rescue by Chatham. (Note: Chatham, W.Bragg, master, of 354 tons (bm), had been launched at Liverpool in 1827. She too was sailing under a licence from the EIC.)

Lloyd's Register (1829) has the annotation "abandoned" to her entry.
