= Waterloo (1815 Bideford ship) =

History

United Kingdom
- Name: Waterloo
- Namesake: Battle of Waterloo
- Builder: Chapman & Ellis, Bideford
- Launched: 20 September 1815 Bideford
- Fate: Abandoned at sea in 1829

General characteristics
- Tons burthen: 446, or 44610/94 (bm)
- Length: 116 ft 9 in (35.6 m)
- Beam: 29 ft 3 in (8.9 m)
- Armament: 4 × 12-pounder carronades

Waterloo was launched in 1815 at Bideford, originally as a West Indiaman. Between 1817 and 1821 she made three voyages to India. She then returned to the West Indies trade. Her crew abandoned her at sea in 1829.

== Career ==
Waterloo first appeared in Lloyd's Register (LR) in 1815 with Blacken, master, Wm.Fry, owner, and trade London–Grenada.

In 1813 the EIC had lost its monopoly on the trade between India and Britain. British ships were then free to sail to India or the Indian Ocean under a license from the EIC.

In April 1817 Captain T. Hurt (or Hart, or Hunt, or Hurst), planned to sail Waterloo for Fort William, India. However, she actually left on 2 August. On 9 August she was at Plymouth, on her way to Bengal. On 2 January 1818 she arrived at Bengal and on 4 April she sailed for London. On 13 September she arrived back at Deal and four days later she was at Gravesend.

Year	Master	Owner	Trade	Source
1818	J.Hunt	Wm.Fry & Co.	London–Fort William	LR
1820	Lovell	Wm.Fry & Co.	London–Bombay	LR

On 14 February 1819 Waterloo, Lovell, master, arrived at Bombay.

On 4 March 1820 Waterloo, Lovell, master, sailed from Gravesend for India, On 10 March she sailed from Portsmouth for Madras and Bengal. On 27 July she arrived at Bengal from London and Madeira. On 20 November she sailed from Bengal for Colombo. She sailed from Colombo on 11 February 1821 and the Cape of Good Hope on 16 April. On 20 June she was off Plymouth, but with her fore and mizzen masts sprung. She reached Gravesend on 30 June.

Year	Master	Owner	Trade	Source & notes
1821	Lovell; Leveque	Wm.Fry & Co.	London–Bombay; London–Jamaica	LR
1827	Loveque	Wm.Fry & Co.	London–Jamaica	LR
1828	Loveque; Partridge	Wm.Fry & Co.	London–Jamaica	LR;

== Fate ==
On 29 September 1829 Lloyd's List reported that her crew had abandoned Waterloo, Partridge, master, at sea. On 6 October it reported that Waterloo had wrecked. Lastly, LL reported that Waterloo, Partridge, master, had been found abandoned.

Waterloo was last listed in 1829 with unchanged data from 1828.

She is certainly not the Waterloo that a storm drove on shore on 5 December 1827 at Madras.
