= List of ship launches in 1813 =

The list of ship launches in 1813 includes a chronological list of some ships launched in 1813.

Date	Ship	Class	Builder	Location	Country	Notes
1 January	Competitor	Brig	Smales & Co.	Whitby	United Kingdom	For Smales & Co.
4 January	Hindostan	Merchantman	James Bonner & James Horsbrugh	Sulkea	India	For private owner.
4 January	Thetis	Merchantman	James Macrase	Chittagong	India	For private owner.
21 January	Elizabeth	Merchantman	Barkworth & Hawkes	Hessle	United Kingdom	For John Barkworth.
January	Queen Charlotte	Brig	Robert Campbell	Sydney	(United Kingdom of Great Britain and Ireland) New South Wales	For James Birnie and Robert Campbell.
2 February	Hippolyta	West Indiaman	William Gibson	Hull	United Kingdom	For G. Schonswar & Co.
2 February	Jaseur	Cruizer-class brig-sloop	Jabez Bayley	Ipswich	United Kingdom	For Royal Navy.
3 February	Benbow	Vengeur-class ship of the line	John Brent	Rotherhithe	United Kingdom	For Royal Navy.
16 February	Fly	Cruizer-class brig-sloop	Jabez Bayley	Ipswich	United Kingdom	For Royal Navy.
16 February	Grasshopper	Cruizer-class brig-sloop	Nicholas Diddams	Portsmouth Dockyard	United Kingdom	For Royal Navy.
17 February	Swallow	Merchantman	Blackmore & Co.	Sulkea	India	For private owner.
25 February	Borodino	Merchantman	Laing & Co.	South Shields	United Kingdom	For Row & Co.
February	Clyde	Paddle steamer		River Clyde	United Kingdom	For private owner.
13 March	Decatur	Schooner	Pritchard & Shrewsbury	Charleston, South Carolina	United States	For private owner.
25 March	Albinia	Merchantman	William Smith & Co.	Newcastle upon Tyne	United Kingdom	For Clay & Co.
6 April	Lady of the Lake	Schooner	Henry Eckford	Sackett's Harbor, New York	United States	For United States Navy.
14 April	Albion	Merchantman	George Hilhouse & Sons	Bristol	United Kingdom	For R. Kidd.
17 April	Bacchus	Cruizer-class brig-sloop	Robert Seppings	Chatham Dockyard	United Kingdom	For Royal Navy.
17 April	Cydnus	Cydnus-class frigate	Wigram, Wells & Green	Blackwall Yard	United Kingdom	For Royal Navy.
17 April	Eurotas	Leda-class frigate	Robert Wigram	Blackwall Yard	United Kingdom	For Royal Navy.
22 April	Sir George Prevost	Sloop-of-war	James Morrison	Kingston Royal Naval Dockyard	(United Kingdom of Great Britain and Ireland) Lower Canada	For Provincial Marine.
24 April	Asia	Barque	Fishburn & Brodrick	Whitby	United Kingdom	For Mr. Chapman.
April	Ariel	Schooner	Adam and Noah Brown	Presque Isle Bay, Pennsylvania	United States	For United States Navy.
1 May	Anacreon	Cormorant-class ship-sloop	Owen / Joseph Tucker	Ringmore / Plymouth Dockyard	United Kingdom	For Royal Navy.
1 May	Creole	Fifth rate	Joseph Tucker	Plymouth Dockyard	United Kingdom	For Royal Navy.
1 May	Eridanus	Scamander-class frigate	Mary Ross	Rochester	United Kingdom	For Royal Navy.
1 May	Vesuvius	Vesuvius-class bomb vessel	Robert Dy	Topsham	United Kingdom	For Royal Navy.
12 May	Cornwallis	Vengeur-class ship of the line	Jamsetjee Bomanjee Wadia	Bombay	India	For Royal Navy.
15 May	Challenger	Cruizer-class brig-sloop	Hobbs & Hellyer	Redbridge	United Kingdom	For Royal Navy.
15 May	Swinger	Bold-class gun-brig	William Good	Bridport	United Kingdom	For Royal Navy.
6 Mayu	Halcyon	Cruizer-class brig-sloop	Edward Larking & William Sprong	King's Lynn	United Kingdom	For Royal Navy.
19 May	Niger	Leda-class frigate	Robert Wigram	Blackwall Yard	United Kingdom	For Royal Navy.
21 May	Phillippa	Merchantman	Michael Smith	Howrah	India	For private owner.
24 May	Lawrence	Niagara-class brig	Adam and Noah Brown	Erie, Pennsylvania	United States	For United States Navy.
30 May	Sultane	Pallas-class frigate	Mathurin Crucy	Paimbœuf	France	For French Navy.
31 May	Blenheim	Vengeur-class ship of the line	Robert John Nelson	Deptford Dockyard	United Kingdom	For Royal Navy.
31 May	Laurel	Lively-class frigate	George Parsons	Warsash	United Kingdom	For Royal Navy.
May	Porcupine	Schooner	Adam and Noah Brown	Presque Isle, Pennsylvania	(United States)	For United States Navy.
12 June	General Pike	Corvette	Henry Eckford	Sackett's Harbor, New York	United States	For United States Navy.
13 June	Niagara	Snow	Daniel Dobbins	Erie, Pennsylvania	United States	For United States Navy.
14 June	Forth	Endymion-class frigate	Wigram and Green	Blackwall	United Kingdom	For Royal Navy.
14 June	Severn	Endymion-class frigate	Wigram, Wells & Green	Blackwall Yard	United Kingdom	For Royal Navy.
18 June	Myrmidon	Hermes-class post ship	William Stone	Milford Haven	United Kingdom	For Royal Navy.
28 June	Adder	Bold-class gun-brig	Robert Davy	Topsham	United Kingdom	For Royal Navy.
29 June	Orontes	Scamander-class frigate	Josiah & Thomas Brindley	Frindsbury	United Kingdom	For Royal Navy.
29 June	Penguin	Cruizer-class brig-sloop	William Bottomley	King's Lynn	United Kingdom	For Royal Navy.
29 June	Terror	Vesuvius-class bomb vessel	Robert Davy	Topsham	United Kingdom	For Royal Navy.
3 July	Tigris	Scamander-class frigate	John Pelham	Frindsbury	United Kingdom	For Royal Navy.
3 July	Vestnik	Vestnik-class cutter	B. F. Stoke	Saint Petersburg	Russia	For Imperial Russian Navy.
6 July	Princess Charlotte	Merchantman		Hylton Ferry	United Kingdom	For private owner.
11 July	Argus	Cruizer-class brig-sloop	Thomas Hills	Sandwich	United Kingdom	For Royal Navy.
13 July	Alert	Cruizer-class brig-sloop	Thomas Pitcher	Northfleet	United Kingdom	For Royal Navy.
13 July	Scamander	Scamander-class frigate	Josiah Brindley	Frindsbury	United Kingdom	For Royal Navy.
14 July	England	Merchantman	Buckle & Davies	Chepstow	United Kingdom	For T. Ward.
14 July	Griper	Bold-class gun-brig	Richards & Davidson	Hythe	United Kingdom	For Royal Navy.
14 July	Ister	Scamander-class frigate	William Wallis	Blackwall	United Kingdom	For Royal Navy.
14 July	Lively	Leda-class frigate	Robert Seppings	Chatham Dockyard	United Kingdom	For Royal Navy.
15 July	Clinker	Bold-class gun-brig	Robert Davey	Topsham	United Kingdom	For Royal Navy.
15 July	Harlequin	Cruizer-class brig-sloop	Jabez Bayley	Ipswich	United Kingdom	For Royal Navy.
15 July	Mingreliia	Unrated	A. I. Melikhov	Sevastopol	Russia	For Imperial Russian Navy.
15 July	Tagus	Scamander-class frigate	Daniel List	Fishbourne	United Kingdom	For Royal Navy.
15 July	Neva	Barque	Bunney & Firbank	Hull	United Kingdom	For private owner.
19 July	Berlin	Selafail-class ship of the line	A. M. Kurochkin	Arhcangelsk	Russia	For Imperial Russian Navy.
19 July	Gamburg	Selafail-class ship of the line	A. M. Kurochkin	Arhcangelsk	Russia	For Imperial Russian Navy.
22 July	Vittoria	Transport ship	W. S. Chapman	Whitby	United Kingdom	For Henry Simpson & W. S. Chapman.
28 July	Étoile	Pallas-class frigate	Mathurin Crucy	Nantes	France	For French Navy.
28 July	Harrier	Cruizer-class brig-sloop	Jabez Bayley	Ipswich	United Kingdom	For Royal Navy.
29 July	Carnation	Cruizer-class brig-sloop	James and William Durkin	Northam	United Kingdom	For Royal Navy.
30 July	Beelzebub	Vesuvius-class bomb vessel	William Taylor	Bideford	United Kingdom	For Royal Navy.
31 July	Alacrity	Brigantine	William Smith & Co.	Newcastle upon Tyne	United Kingdom	For Thomas, Thomas & Smith.
31 July	Drezden	Selafail-class ship of the line	A. M. Kurochkin	Arkhangelsk	Russia	For Imperial Russin Navy.
31 July	Liubek	Selafail-class ship of the line	A. M. Kurochkin	Arkhangelsk	Russia	For Imperial Russian Navy.
31 July	Rostislav	Ches'ma-class ship of the line	I. P. Amosov	Kronstadt	Russia	For Imperial Russian Navy.
31 July	Terror	Vesuvius-class bomb vessel	Robert Davy	Topsham	United Kingdom	For Royal Navy.
July	Detroit	Sloop-of-war	Amherstburg Royal Naval Dockyard	Amherstburg	(United Kingdom of Great Britain and Ireland) Lower Canada	For Royal Navy.
July	Flora	Merchantman		Narsipore	India	For private owner.
July	General Kempt	Full-rigged ship		Point Neuf	(United Kingdom of Great Britain and Ireland) Upper Canada	For private owner.
12 August	Pandora	Cruizer-class brig-sloop	William Stone	Deptford	United Kingdom	For Royal Navy.
13 August	Perle	Milanaise-class frigate	Louis Jean Baptiste Bretocq	Dunkirk	France	For French Navy.
13 August	Maeander	Leda-class frigate	Thomas Pitcher	Northfleet	United Kingdom	For Royal Navy.
13 August	Medina	Cyrus-class post ship	Edward Adams	Bucklers Hard	United Kingdom	For Royal Navy.
14 August	Pactolus	Cydnus-class frigate	Frances Barnard	Deptford	United Kingdom	For Royal Navy.
15 August	Héros	Océan-class ship of the line	Antoine Arnoud	Toulon	France	For French Navy.
16 August	Cossack	Merchantman	John Munn Sr. & John Munn Jr.	Quebec	(United Kingdom of Great Britain and Ireland) Lower Canada	For private owner.
18 August	Sylph	Schooner	Henry Eckford	Sackett's Harbor, New York	United States	For United States Navy.
26 August	Argus	Amfitrada-class frigate	B. F. Stoke	Saint Petersburg	Russia	For Imperial Russian Navy.
26 August	Cyrus	Cyrus-class post ship	William Courtney	Chester	United Kingdom	For Royal Navy.
26 August	Morning Star	Brig	J. Scott & Co.	Calcutta	India	For Lackersteen & Co.
27 August	Mary	Full-rigged ship	Farnie	Burntisland	United Kingdom	For Higgins & Wheatley.
27 August	Pelter	Bold-class gun-brig	Henry Tucker	Bideford	United Kingdom	For Royal Navy.
28 August	Cadmus	Merchantman	H. Blanchard	Sunderland	United Kingdom	For Philip Laing.
28 August	Dartmouth	Apollo-class frigate	Cook	Dartmouth	United Kingdom	For Royal Navy.
28 August	Elk	Cruizer-class brig-sloop	Hobbs	Redbridge	United Kingdom	For Royal Navy.
30 August	Confiance	Cruizer-class brig-sloop	Mary Ross	Rochester	United Kingdom	For Royal Navy.
5 September	Scipion	Téméraire-class ship of the line			France	For French Navy.
9 September	Radnor	Merchantman	Anthony Blackmore	Sulkia	India	For private owner.
11 September	Frolic	Sloop-of-war	Josiah Barker	Charlestown, Massachusetts	United States	For United States Navy.
11 September	Sirius	Lively-class frigate	Blake Tyson	Bursledon	United Kingdom	For Royal Navy.
13 September	Araxes	Leda-class frigate	Thomas Pitcher	Northfleet	United Kingdom	For Royal Navy.
13 September	Hebrus	Scamander-class frigate	John Barton	Limehouse	United Kingdom	For Royal Navy.
18 September	Wasp	Sloop-of-war	Cross & Merrill	Newburyport, Massachusetts	United States	For United States Navy.
19 September	Peacock	Sloop-of-war	Adam and Noah Brown	New York Navy Yard	United States	For United States Navy.
24 September	Liffey	Endymion-class frigate	Wigram & Green	Blackwall	United Kingdom	For Royal Navy.
25 September	Mastiff	Bold-class gun-brig	James Taylor	Bideford	United Kingdom	For Royal Navy.
27 September	Snapper	Bold-class gun-brig	Hobbs & Hellyer	Redbridge	United Kingdom	For Royal Navy.
30 September	Rancune	Pallas-class frigate	François-Frédéric Poncet	Toulon	France	For French Navy.
September	Glasgow	Paddle steamer		River Clyde	United Kingdom	For private owner.
7 October	Pilot	Merchantman	Temple shipbuilders	Jarrow	United Kingdom	For private owner.
9 October	Orion	Téméraire-class ship of the line		Brest	France	For French Navy.
9 October	Plumper	Bold-class gun-brig	William Good	Bridport	United Kingdom	For Royal Navy.
11 October	Esk	Cyrus-class ship-sloop	Jabez Bayley	Ipswich	United Kingdom	For Royal Navy.
12 October	Duquesne	Bucentaure-class ship of the line		Cherbourg	France	For French Navy.
12 October	Zélandais	Bucentaure-class ship of the line	Jean Michel Segondat	Cherbourg	France	For French Navy.
21 October	Mulgrave Castle	Merchantman	William James & Robert Tindall	Scarborough	United Kingdom	For William James & Robert Tindall.
23 October	Moira	Merchantman	Matthew Smith	Calcutta	India	For private owner.
23 October	Susan	Merchantman	Matthew Smith	Calcutta	India	For private owner.
25 October	Granicus	Scamander-class frigate	John Barton	Limehouse	United Kingdom	For Royal Navy.
26 October	Couronne	Téméraire-class ship of the line	Schuyt	Amsterdam	(France) French First Empire	For French Navy.
26 October	Ontario	Cruizer-class brig-sloop	Richard Chapman	Bideford	United Kingdom	For Royal Navy.
27 October	Tanais	Leda-class frigate	Mary Ross	Rochester	United Kingdom	For Royal Navy.
1 November	Brien	Anapa-class ship of the line	M. K. Surovtsov	Kherson	Russia	For Imperial Russian Navy.
1 November	Vezul	Vezul-class frigate	M. K. Surovtsov	Kherson	Russia	For Imperial Russian Navy.
3 November	Erie	Sloop-of-war	Thomas Kemp	Baltimore, Maryland	United States	For United States Navy.
4 November	Kulm	Anapa-class ship of the line	Tarusov	Kherson	Russia	For Imperial Russian Navy.
8 November	Euphrates	Scamander-class frigate	John King	Upnor	United Kingdom	For Royal Navy.
9 November	Carron	Cyrus-class ship-sloop	Edward Adams	Bucklers Hard	United Kingdom	For Royal Navy.
10 November	Duguay-Trouin	Téméraire-class ship of the line		Cherbourg	France	For French Navy.
10 November	Leander	Fourth rate	Wigram, Wells & Green	Blackwall Yard	United Kingdom	For Royal Navy.
10 November	Newcastle	Fourth rate	Wigram, Wells & Green	Blackwall Yard	United Kingdom	For Royal Navy.
10 November	Tiber	Leda-class frigate	Daniel List	Binstead	United Kingdom	For Royal Navy.
11 November	Sappho	Merchantman	Holt & Richardson	Whitby	United Kingdom	For S. Holt.
15 November	Betsey	Humber Keel		Knottingley	United Kingdom	For private owner.
15 November	Speshnyi	Vezul-class frigate	M. K. Surovtsov	Kherson	Russia	For Imperial Russian Navy.
21 November	Sphinx	Sylphe-class brig	Mathurin Boucher	Genoa	(France) French First Republic	For French Navy.
22 November	Jupiter	Fourth rate	Thomas Roberts	Plymouth Dockyard	United Kingdom	For Royal Navy.
23 November	Vindictive	Armada-class ship of the line	Nicholas Diddams	Portsmouth Dockyard	United Kingdom	For Royal Navy.
24 November	Lady Flora	East Indiaman	Anthony Blackmore	Calcutta	India	For private owner.
28 November	Tay	Cyrus-class post ship	Balthazar Adams	Bucklers Hard	United Kingdom	For Royal Navy.
30 November	Vindictive	Vengeur-class ship of the line		Portsmouth Dockyard	United Kingdom	For Royal Navy.
November	Shannon	Brig			United Kingdom	For private owner.
November	Earl of Moira	East Indiaman		Calcutta	India	For British East India Company.
November	General Kyd	East Indiaman		Calcutta	India	For British East India Company.
November	Susan	East Indiaman		Calcutta	India	For British East India Company.
November	Vansittart	East Indiaman		Calcutta	India	For British East India Company.
1 December	City of Edinburgh	Merchantman	A. Woodcock	Coringa	India	For J. Farquhara & Co.
2 December	Brilliant	Merchantman	John Barry	Whitby	United Kingdom	For John Barry & Co.
5 December	Colosse	Téméraire-class ship of the line		Toulon	France	For French Navy.
6 December	Jane	Merchantman	John Scott & Co.	Calcutta	India	For private owner.
8 December	Levant	Cyrus-class post ship	William Courtney	Chester	United Kingdom	For Royal Navy.
9 December	Emma	Merchantman	Michael Smith	Calcutta	India	For private owner.
9 December	Slaney	Cyrus-class post ship	Josiah & Thomas Brindley	Frindsbury	United Kingdom	For Royal Navy.
10 December	Lady Ridley	West Indiaman	William Stoveld	Blyth	United Kingdom	For private owner.
18 December	Erne	Cyrus-class post ship	Robert Newman	Dartmouth	United Kingdom	For Royal Navy.
23 December	Leven	Cyrus-class post ship	Jabez Bayley	Ipswich	United Kingdom	For Royal Navy.
December	Orange Boven	Merchantman		Portsmouth, New Hampshire	United States	For private owner.
Spring	Comet	Steamboat		Pittsburgh, Pennsylvania	United States	For Daniel D. Smith.
Unknown date	Achilles	Merchantman	Wright & Harle	South Shields	United Kingdom	For Wright & Co.
Unknown date	Admiraal Piet Hein	Third rate		Rotterdam	(France) French First Empire	For Dutch Navy.
Unknown date	Alexander	Merchantman		Aberdeen	United Kingdom	For Ritchie & Co.
Unknown date	Amelia	Schooner	Adam and Noah Brown	Erie, Pennsylvania	United States	For private owner.
Unknown date	Amphitrite	Merchantman		Sunderland	United Kingdom	For Denton & Co.
Unknown date	Ann Elizabeth	Snow	William & John M. Gales.	Sunderland	United Kingdom	For James Bruce and others.
Unknown date	Aylwyn	Full-rigged ship			United States	For United States Navy.
Unknown date	Ballard	Full-rigged ship		Vergennes, Vermont	United States	For United States Navy.
Unknown date	Bull Dog	Full-rigged ship			United States	For United States Navy.
Unknown date	Buffalo	Sloop-of-war	Charles Penrose	Philadelphia, Pennsylvania	United States	For United States Navy.
Unknown date	Buffalo	Luggage boat		Bombay	India	For British East India Company.
Unknown date	Cadmus	Merchantman	John & Philip Laing	Sunderland	United Kingdom	For Laing & Co.
Unknown date	Camden	Merchantman	W. S. Chapman & Co.	Whitby	United Kingdom	For Simpson, Chapman & Chapman.
Unknown date	Cecelia	Pilot boat		Bombay	India	For Bombay Pilot Service.
Unknown date	Cossack	Merchantman		Liverpool	United Kingdom	For Richey & Co.
Unknown date	Dart	Privateer		New Orleans, Louisiana	United States	For private owner.
Unknown date	Eagle	Full-rigged ship			United States	For United States Navy.
Unknown date	Earl Moira	Full-rigged ship	R. Reay	Sunderland	United Kingdom	For Mr. Hunter.
Unknown date	Economy	Brig	J. Crone	Sunderland	United Kingdom	For private owner.
Unknown date	Edward Ellice	Merchantman		St. Andrews	(United Kingdom of Great Britain and Ireland) Colony of New Brunswick	For G. Inglis & Co.
Unknown date	Eliza	Pilot boat		Bombay	India	For Bombay Pilot Service.
Unknown date	Elizabeth	Paddle steamer	Messrs. Wood	Glasgow	United Kingdom	For Mr. Hutcheson.
Unknown date	Emperor Alexander	Merchantman		Chepstow	United Kingdom	For private owner.
Unknown date	Emu	Brig		Dartmouth	United Kingdom	For Transport Board.
Unknown date	Erie	Full-rigged ship			United States	For United States Navy.
Unknown date	Ernaad	Merchantman		Bombay	India	For British East India Company.
Unknown date	Etna	Full-rigged ship			United States	For United States Navy.
Unknown date	Grecian	Privateer	Thomas Kemp	Baltimore, Maryland	United States	For Massachusetts State Navy.
Unknown date	Guerrero	Merchantman	Amasa Miller	New London, Connecticut	United States	For Rennselaer Havens, Frederick Jenkins and Daniel Sullivan.
Unknown date	Gunboat No. 5	Gunboat			United States	For United States Navy.
Unknown date	Gunboat No. 23	Gunboat			United States	For United States Navy.
Unknown date	Gunboat No. 156	Gunboat			United States	For United States Navy.
Unknown date	Gunboat No. 162	Gunboat			United States	For United States Navy.
Unknown date	Gunboat No. 163	Gunboat			United States	For United States Navy.
Unknown date	Indus	West Indiaman	Henry & William Wright	Newcastle upon Tyne	United Kingdom	For Henry & William Wright.
Unknown date	Irlam	West Indiaman		Liverpool	United Kingdom	For Barton & Co.
Unknown date	Isabella	Transport ship		Hull	United Kingdom	For W. Moxon.
Unknown date	Jane	West Indiaman		Hull	United Kingdom	For Raines & Co.
Unknown date	Jolly Rambler	Sloop		Broadstairs	United Kingdom	For private owner.
Unknown date	La Diligente	Gunboat		Corfu	(France) Ionian Islands	For French Navy.
Unknown date	Lancaster	Merchantman	John Brockbank	Lancaster	United Kingdom	For private owner.
Unknown date	Laurel	Merchantman		Monkwearmouth	United Kingdom	For private owner.
Unknown date	Leander	West Indiaman		Whitehaven	United Kingdom	For private owner.
Unknown date	Lord Melville	Schooner	Kingston Royal Naval Dockyard	Kingston, Ontario	(United Kingdom of Great Britain and Ireland) Lower Canada	For Royal Navy.
Unknown date	Marshall Wellington	Brig	William & John M. Gales.	Sunderland	United Kingdom	For John White.
Unknown date	Medusa	Merchantman	Thomas Barrick	Whitby	United Kingdom	For Thomas Barrick and Thomas Hutchinson.
Unknown date	Minerva	Merchantman	A. Hall	Aberdeen	United Kingdom	For Mr. Saunders.
Unknown date	Montgomery	Sloop-of-war	Thomas Macdonough		United Kingdom	For United States Navy.
Unknown date	Navigator	Brig		Sunderland	United Kingdom	For private owner.
Unknown date	Nearchus	Full-rigged ship	William & John M. Gales	Sunderland	United Kingdom	For John White.
Unknown date	Nerbudda	Prow		Bombay	India	For British East India Company.
Unknown date	Nimble	Schooner		Plymouth	United Kingdom	For private owner.
Unknown date	Nimble	cutter			United Kingdom	For private owner.
Unknown date	Norina	Brig	William & John M. Gales	Sunderland	United Kingdom	For John Spence.
Unknown date	Oromocto	Merchantman		Oromocto	(United Kingdom of Great Britain and Ireland) Colony of New Brunswick	For private owner.
Unknown date	Paragon	Schooner	C. Turner	Medford, Massachusetts	United States	For John Peters.
Unknown date	Preble	Full-rigged ship			United States	For United States Navy.
Unknown date	Prince de Neufchatel	Hermaphrodite brig	Adam and Noah Brown	New York	United States	For private owner.
Unknown date	Rambler	Merchantman	Calvin Turner	Medford, Massachusetts	United States	For Benjamin Rich.
Unknown date	Relief	Brig		Sunderland	United Kingdom	For private owner.
Unknown date	Sarah	Merchantman	John & Philip Laing	Sunderland	United Kingdom	For Fenwick & Co.
Unknown date	Scorpion	Schooner		Presque Isle, Pennsylvania	United States	For United States Navy.
Unknown date	Shannon	Merchantman	John Brockbank	Lancaster	United Kingdom	For private owner.
Unknown date	Spark	Privateer		Sag Harbor, New York	United States	For private owner.
Unknown date	Surprise	Privateer		Saint Michaels, Maryland	United States	For James A. Buchanan, John Hollins, John Smith Hollins, Michael McBlair, Samuel Smith, Lemuel Taylor, and Gerrard Wilson.
Unknown date	Taptee	Prow		Bombay	India	For British East India Company.
Unknown date	Tartar	Privateer		Talbot County, Maryland	United Kingdom	For James & William Bosley.
Unknown date	Thomas & Adah	Brig		Sunderland	United Kingdom	For private owner.
Unknown date	Thomas Durham	Merchantman			(United Kingdom of Great Britain and Ireland) Bermuda	For private owner.
Unknown date	Three Bees	Convict ship		Bridgwater	United Kingdom	For Buckles & Co.
Unknown date	Tiger	Merchantman			United States	For private owner.
Unknown date	Vittoria	Merchantman		Gainsborough	United Kingdom	For Mr. Smith.
Unknown date	Vittoria	West Indiaman		Whitehaven	United Kingdom	For private owner.
Unknown date	Vittoria	Brig	William & John M. Gales	Sunderland	United Kingdom	For John White.
Unknown date	Wasp	Wasp-class sloop	William Badger	Newburyport, Massachusetts	United States	For United States Navy.
Unknown date	Wilna	Merchantman	John & Philip Laing	Sunderland	United Kingdom	For Mr. Clarke.
Unknown date	Young Teazer	Privateer			United States	For Samuel Adams.
Unknown date	Name unknown	Merchantman			France	For private owner.
Unknown date	Name unknown	Merchantman		New York	United States	For private owner.
Unknown date	Name unknown	Merchantman		Antwerp	France	For private owner.
