= USS Buffalo =

Five ships of the United States Navy have been named Buffalo, the first after the large mammal, the others after the city of Buffalo, New York.

- USS Buffalo (1813) was a 3-gun sloop purchased April 1813 at Philadelphia and attached to the Delaware Flotilla. She took part in the 29 July 1813 attack on HMS Junon and HMS Martin. She was sold 12 August 1816.
- USS Buffalo (1893) was an auxiliary cruiser purchased for use in the Spanish–American War.
- USS Buffalo (CL-99) was a planned Cleveland-class light cruiser that was converted into the Independence-class light aircraft carrier USS Bataan (CVL-29).
- USS Buffalo (CL-110) was a planned Fargo-class light cruiser, laid down on 3 April 1944 but the contract for her construction was canceled on 12 August 1945. Her unfinished hull was scrapped.
- USS Buffalo (SSN-715) was the 25th Los Angeles-class nuclear attack submarine, currently pending disposal.
