= Hecla-class bomb vessel =

Class of vessels in the Royal Navy

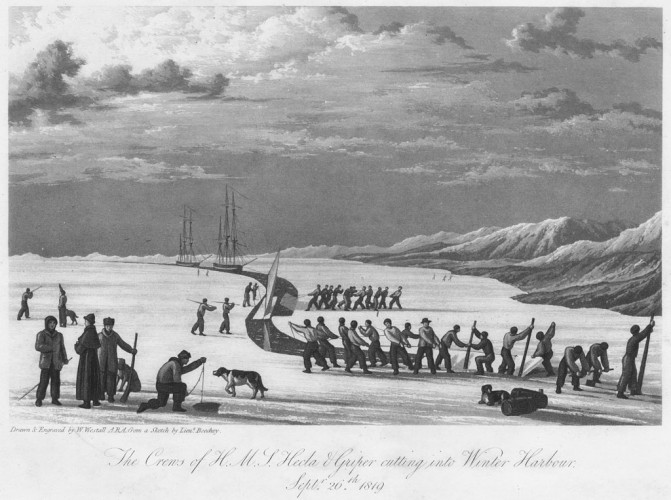
- Ships of William Edward Parry's Arctic expedition, HMS Griper and HMS Hecla

Class overview
- Name: Hecla
- Builders: Mrs Mary Ross, Rochester; Barkworth & Hawkes, North Barton (Hull); Pembroke Dockyard; Chatham Dockyard; Deptford Dockyard; Plymouth Dockyard
- Operators: Royal Navy
- In service: 1814 - 1857
- Planned: 12
- Completed: 8
- Canceled: 4
- Lost: 2
- Retired: 6

General characteristics
- Type: Bomb vessel
- Tons burthen: 372 1/94 tons bm
- Length: 105 ft (32.0 m) (overall); 86 ft 1.25 in (26.2 m) (keel)
- Beam: 28 ft 6 in (8.7 m)
- Depth of hold: 13 ft 10 in (4.22 m)
- Propulsion: Sails
- Sail plan: Full rigged
- Complement: 67
- Armament: Main deck: 10 × 24-pounder carronades + 2 × 6-pounders; 2 × mortars (1 × 13in + 1 × 10in)

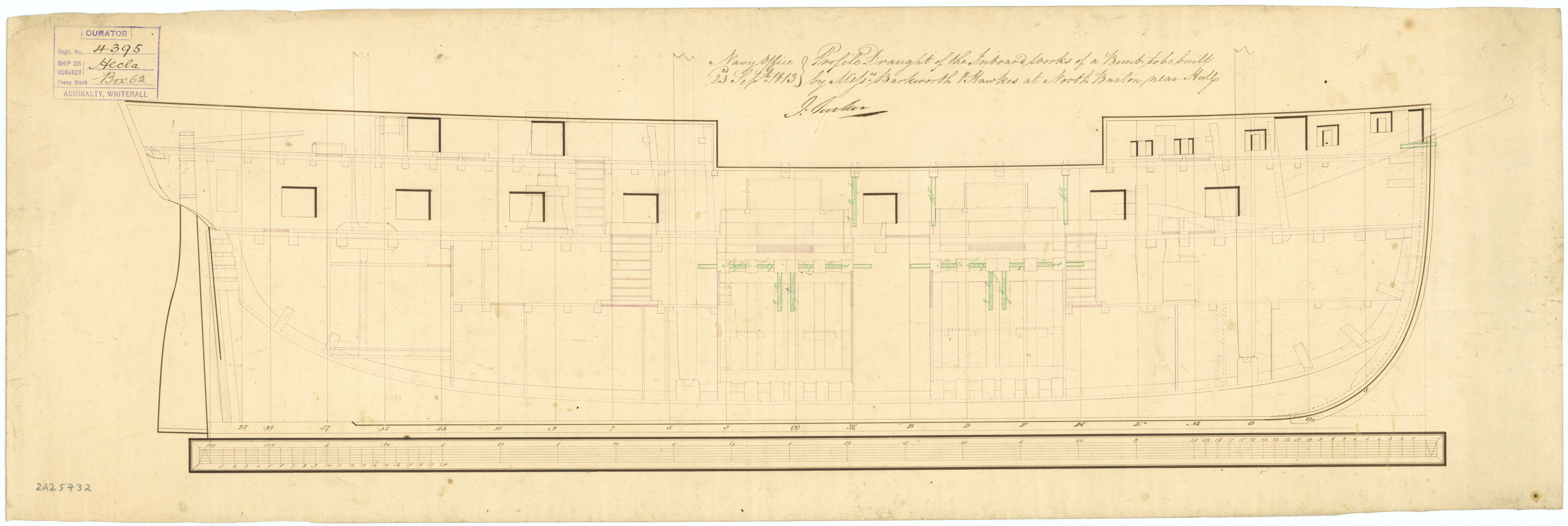
Profile draught of the inboard works of Hecla-class vessel to be built by Barkworth & Hawkes at North Barton near Hull; signed Navy Office 23 September 1813

The Hecla class was a class of bomb vessels of the Royal Navy of the early 19th century. They were designed for use as bomb or mortar ships and were very heavily built. Eight ships were launched; all were converted for use as exploration or survey ships. Four ships of the class are known for the role they played in Arctic and Antarctic exploration.

== Ships ==
- HMS Fury

Builder: Mrs Mary Ross, Rochester
Ordered: 5 June 1813
Laid down: September 1813
Launched: 4 April 1814
Completed:
Notes: Converted to Arctic discovery vessel in 1821
Fate: Bilged in Prince Regent Inlet, and abandoned in the Arctic on 25 August 1825; anchors recovered and now displayed at Fort Saint-Jean (Quebec)

- HMS Hecla

Builder: Barkworth & Hawkes, North Barton (Hull)
Ordered: 5 June 1813
Laid down: July 1813
Launched: 22 July 1815
Completed:
Notes: Arctic discovery vessel from 1819 to 1827. Converted to survey ship in December 1827
Fate: Sold on 13 April 1831; re-sold to M. Wright, master, Elder & Co. and left and wrecked state c. 1845

- HMS Infernal

Builder: Barkworth & Hawkes, North Barton (Hull)
Ordered: 5 June 1813
Laid down: July 1813
Launched: 26 July 1815
Completed:
Notes:
Fate: Sold on 13 April 1831

- HMS Meteor

Builder: Pembroke Dockyard
Ordered: 18 May 1819
Laid down: May 1820
Launched: 25 June 1823
Completed: 26 July 1823
Notes: Survey ship, renamed HMS Beacon in June 1832
Fate: Sold on 17 August 1846

- HMS Aetna

Builder: Chatham Dockyard
Ordered: 18 May 1819
Laid down: September 1821
Launched: 14 May 1824
Completed: June 1824
Notes: Converted to survey ship in 1826. Receiving ship at Portsmouth in 1839.
Fate: Sold on 20 February 1846

- HMS Sulphur

Builder: Chatham Dockyard
Ordered: 18 May 1819
Laid down: May 1824
Launched: 26 January 1826
Completed: 21 February 1826
Notes: The last bomb-ship in Royal Navy service. Converted to survey ship in December 1835. Receiving ship at Woolwich from May 1843
Fate: Broken up by 20 November 1857

- HMS Thunder

Builder: Deptford Dockyard
Ordered: 18 May 1819
Laid down: November 1826
Launched: 4 August 1829
Completed: 26 October 1829
Notes: Converted to survey ship in January 1833
Fate: Broken up in March 1851

- HMS Vesuvius

Builder: Deptford Dockyard
Ordered: 18 May 1819 (Order transferred to Chatham Dockyard, reordered on 30 August 1828)
Laid down: August 1830
Launched:
Completed:
Notes:
Fate: Cancelled on 10 January 1831

- HMS Devastation

Builder: Plymouth Dockyard
Ordered: 18 May 1819
Laid down: 1820
Launched:
Completed:
Notes: Suspended on 10 January 1831
Fate: Cancelled on 11 July 1833

- HMS Volcano

Builder: Plymouth Dockyard
Ordered: 18 May 1819
Laid down: 1821
Launched:
Completed:
Notes: Suspended on 10 January 1831
Fate: Cancelled on 11 July 1833

- HMS Beelzebub

Builder: Plymouth Dockyard
Ordered: 18 May 1819
Laid down:
Launched:
Completed:
Notes: Suspended on 10 January 1831
Fate: Cancelled on 11 July 1833

- HMS Erebus

Builder: Pembroke Dockyard
Ordered: 9 January 1823
Laid down: October 1824
Launched: 7 June 1826
Completed: February 1828
Notes: Arctic discovery vessel in 1839, fitted with screw in 1845
Fate: Abandoned in Arctic on 22 April 1848; discovered underwater in Queen Maud Gulf in 2014 and now preserved as Erebus and Terror National Historic Site of Canada

== Service ==
Fury and Hecla sailed with William Edward Parry on his explorations in search of the Northwest Passage, with Fury being lost to ice on the second. Meteor was renamed Beacon and used as a survey ship, while Aetna and Thunder were both used as survey ships. Sulphur was also used as a survey ship, at one time being commanded by Edward Belcher who later commanded an expedition in search of John Franklin (though not in Sulphur). Erebus was one of two ships commanded by James Clark Ross during his exploration of Antarctica and by Franklin on his ill-fated search for the Northwest Passage. The other was the Vesuvius-class bomb vessel Terror. Both ships were lost during this last voyage.
