= Lady Boringdon =

Lady Boringdon may refer to:

- Theresa Parker (1745–1775), English noblewoman known as Lady Boringdon
- Augusta Fane (1786–1871), English noblewoman known as Lady Boringdon whilst married to John Parker, 1st Earl of Morley (known as 2nd Baron Boringdon from 1788 to 1815)
- Lady Boringdon (1804 ship), a British ship launched in 1804
