= Emma (1813 ship) =

United Kingdom
- Name: Emma
- Owner: Various
- Builder: Michael Smith, Calcutta
- Launched: 9 December 1813 (Note: Hackman reports the launch date for Lady Sophia, and the builder and owner for Lady Flora.)
- Fate: Wrecked 1821

General characteristics
- Tons burthen: 450, or 460, or 467, or 467 70/94, (bm)
- Length: 1808:115 ft 6 in (35.2 m)
- Beam: 1808: 30 ft 10 in (9.4 m)
- Notes: Teak-built

Emma was launched at Calcutta in 1813. From 1814 she made several voyages between India and England under a license from the British East India Company (EIC). A hurricane wrecked her on 4 January 1821 at Table Bay, Cape of Good Hope.

== Career ==
Emma entered Lloyd's Register in 1818 with G. Mitchett, master, Hal & Co., owner, and trade Liverpool–India. She entered the Register of Shipping in 1819 with Michell, master, Hall & Co., owner, and trade Liverpool–Calcutta. However, she had been sailing between India and London before that.

=== Incidents ===
- Emma, country ship, Cripps, master, was among the vessels that arrived at Saint Helena on 13 July 1815 and left on the 17th, bound for India.
- A report from the Cape of Good Hope dated 13 September 1817, stated that Emma, Mitchell, master, from Bengal, had damaged part of her cargo. She would unload that at the Cape, and then sail to South America and the Mediterranean. However, on 18 October, before Emma could leave Table Bay, Oromocto, Strickland, master, broke free of her cables and ran afoul of Emma, carrying away her fore yard.

=== Voyages to India from England under EIC license ===
Date sailed	Master	Owner	Destination
31 March 1815	T. Cripps	T. Cripps	Madras & Bengal
25 January 1817	T. Cripps	T. Cripps	Madras & Bengal
28 March 1818	G.G. Mitchell	J. Palmer	Fort William, India
22 September 1820	C. Baumgardt	G. Larpent	Bombay

== Fate ==
Lloyd's Register for 1821 showed Emma's master as Baumgarda and her owner as Paxton & Co. On 4 January 1821 a hurricane struck Table Bay and wrecked three vessels; one was Emma, Baumgart, master. She had been sailing from London to Bengal. Most of the cargoes were saved, as were the crews.
