= HMS Fury (1814) =

19th-century British Royal Navy bomb vessel

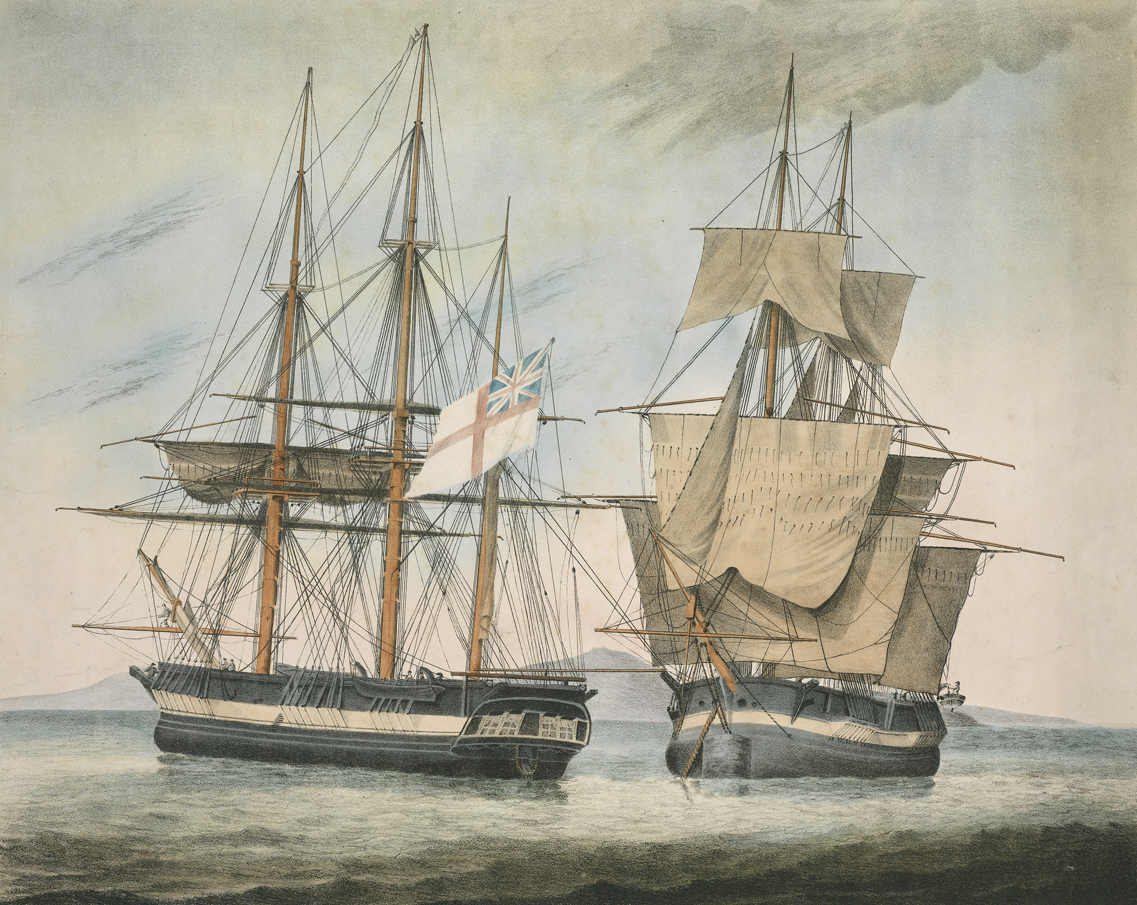
- Lithograph depicting HMS Hecla (1815) and HMS Fury, by Arthur Parsey, 1823

History

United Kingdom
- Name: HMS Fury
- Ordered: 5 June 1813
- Builder: Mrs Mary Ross, Rochester, Kent
- Laid down: September 1813
- Launched: 4 April 1814
- Reclassified: Converted to Arctic discovery vessel, 1821
- Fate: Bilged in Prince Regent Inlet, Baffin Island and abandoned, 25 August 1825

General characteristics
- Class & type: Hecla-class bomb vessel
- Tons burthen: 372 1/94 tons bm
- Length: 105 ft (32.0 m) (overall); 86 ft 1.25 in (26.2 m) (keel)
- Beam: 28 ft 6 in (8.7 m)
- Depth of hold: 13 ft 10 in (4.22 m)
- Propulsion: Sails
- Sail plan: Full rigged
- Complement: 67
- Armament: 10 × 24-pounder carronades; 2 × 6-pounder guns; 1 × 13-inch (330 mm) mortar; 1 × 10-inch (250 mm) mortar

HMS Fury was a Hecla-class bomb vessel of the British Royal Navy.

== Military service ==
The ship was ordered on 5 June 1813 from the yard of Mrs Mary Ross, at Rochester, Kent, laid down in September, and launched on 4 April 1814.

Fury saw service at the Bombardment of Algiers on 27 August 1816, under the command of Constantine Richard Moorsom.

== Arctic exploration ==
Between November 1820 and April 1821, Fury was converted to an Arctic exploration ship and re-rated as a sloop. Commander William Edward Parry commissioned her in December 1820, and Fury then made two journeys to the Arctic, both in company with her sister ship, Hecla. Her first Arctic journey, in 1821, was Parry's second in search of the Northwest Passage. The farthest point on this trip, the perpetually frozen strait between Foxe Basin and the Gulf of Boothia, was named after the two ships, Fury and Hecla Strait.

On her second Arctic trip, Fury was commanded by Henry Parkyns Hoppner while Parry, in command of the expedition, moved to Hecla. This voyage was disastrous for Fury. She was damaged by ice at the start of the second season and was eventually abandoned on 25 August 1825, at what has since been called Fury Beach on Somerset Island. Her stores were unloaded onto the beach and later came to the rescue of John Ross, who travelled overland to the abandoned cache when he lost his ship further south in the Gulf of Boothia on his 1829 expedition.

== Legacy ==
In 1956, Captain T. C. Pullen, Royal Canadian Navy (RCN), sailed HMCS Labrador on an expedition through the Northwest Passage. During this voyage Labrador recovered two Admiralty Pattern anchors on Fury Beach, Somerset Island. The anchors were left there in 1825 by the crews of Fury and Hecla, together with stores, boats, and other items. The anchors had been a landmark for sailors for 136 years.

Labrador transported the artefacts to Halifax, Nova Scotia, and they were placed in the Maritime Command Museum (1961). In 1972, Fury's anchors were moved to CCG Base Dartmouth, Nova Scotia. In 1981, the anchors were removed to the Canadian Coast Guard College at Sydney, Nova Scotia. In 1991, the relics were prepared to be part of a popular exhibit. On 6 May 1998, the anchors were donated by the Canadian Forces Maritime Command (MARCOM) to the Collège militaire royal de Saint-Jean at Saint-Jean-sur-Richelieu, Quebec. Currently, the anchors are displayed at the northeastern corner of the parade square, and are in the custody of le Musèe du Fort Saint-Jean.

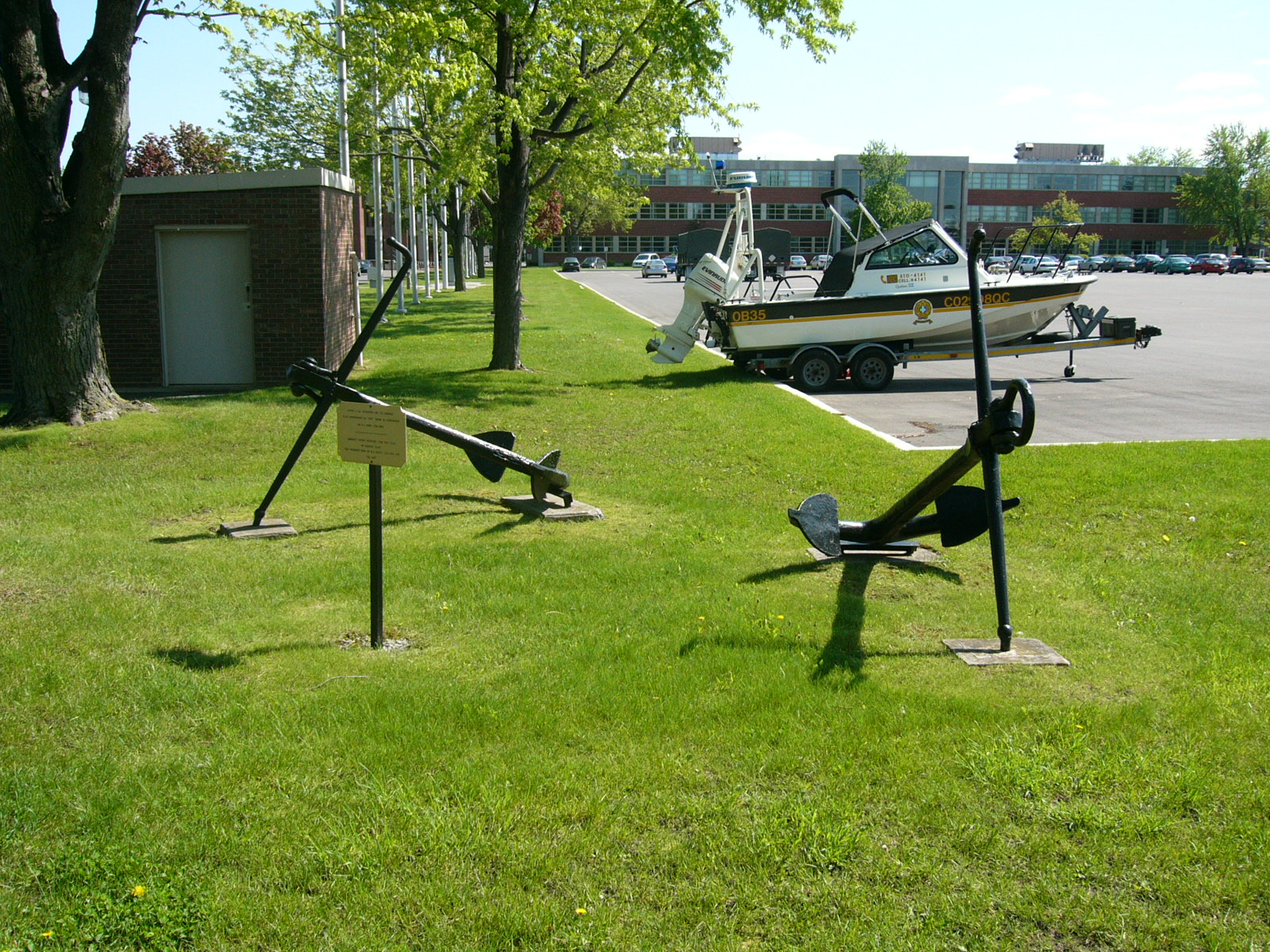
Anchors of HMS Fury at the Royal Military College Saint-Jean at Fort Saint-Jean, Quebec, Canada

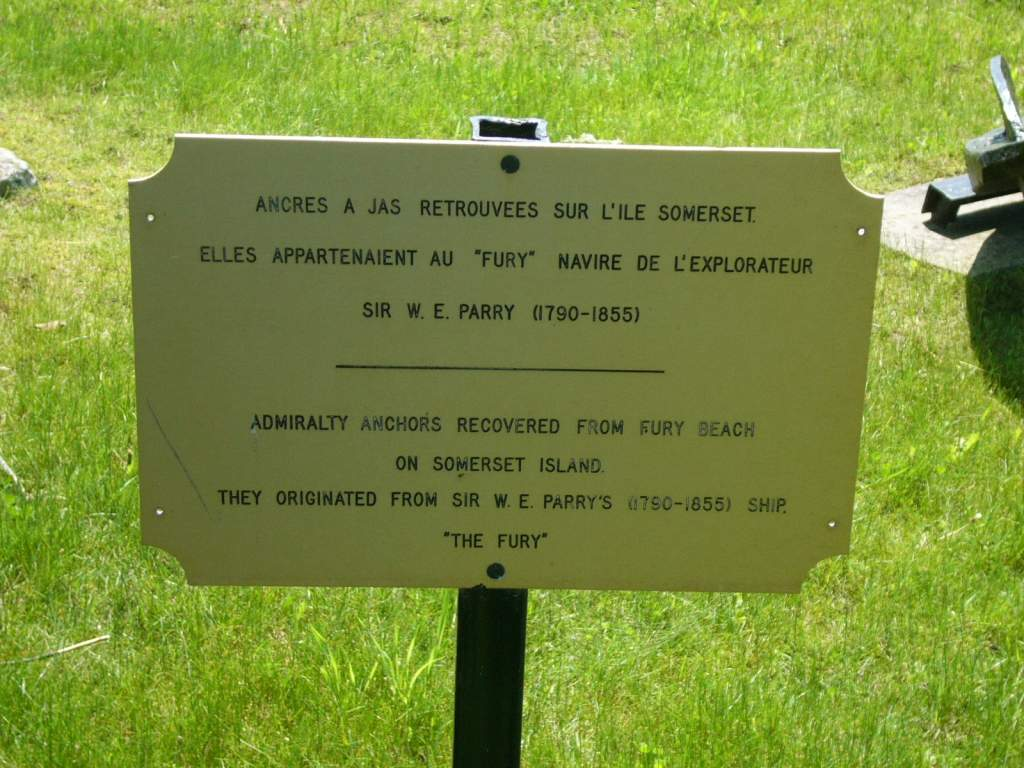
Explanatory plaque

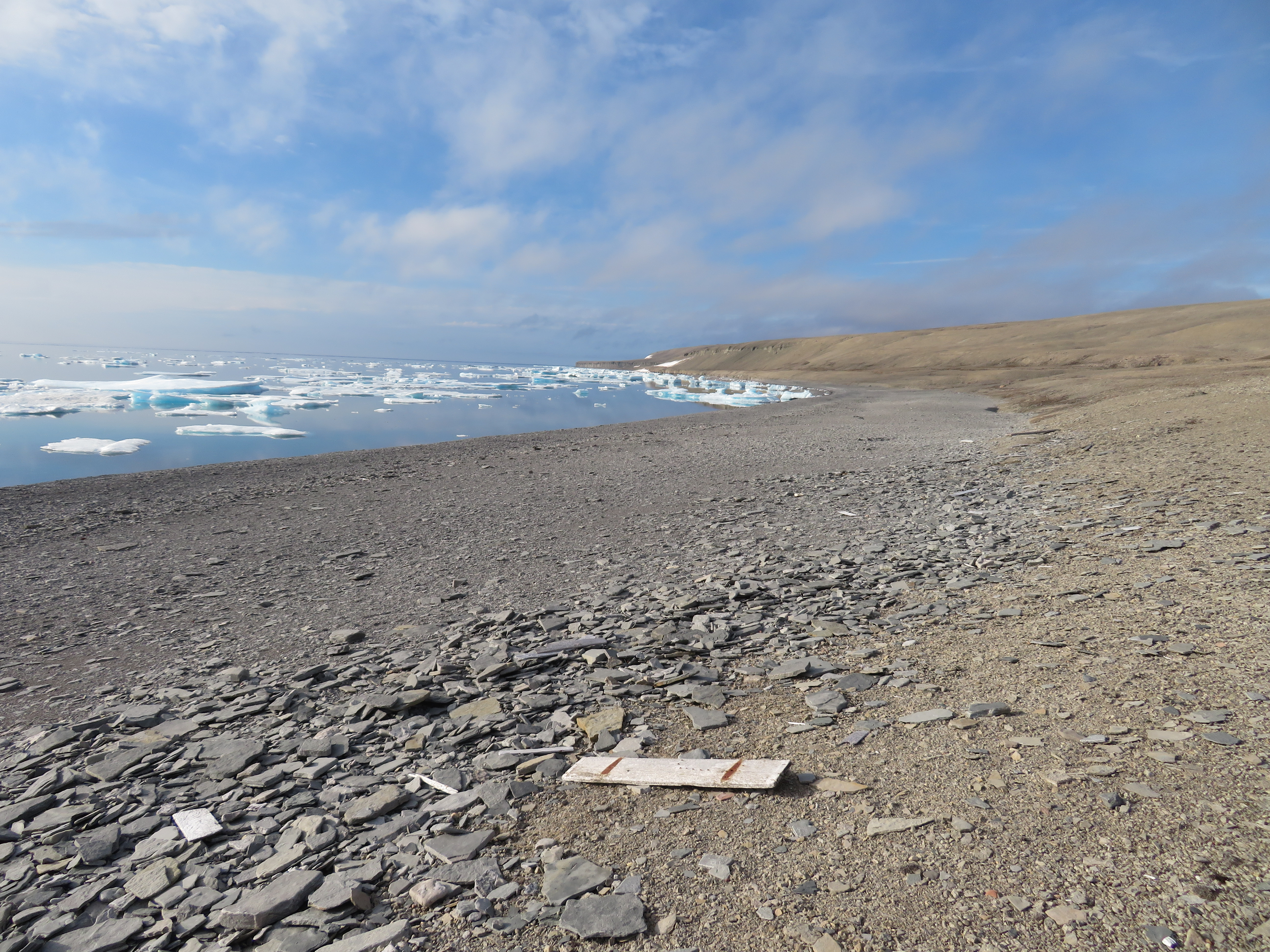
Fury Beach - still littered with wooden & metal material.
