= USS Buffalo (SSN-715) =

Los Angeles-class nuclear-powered attack submarine of the US Navy

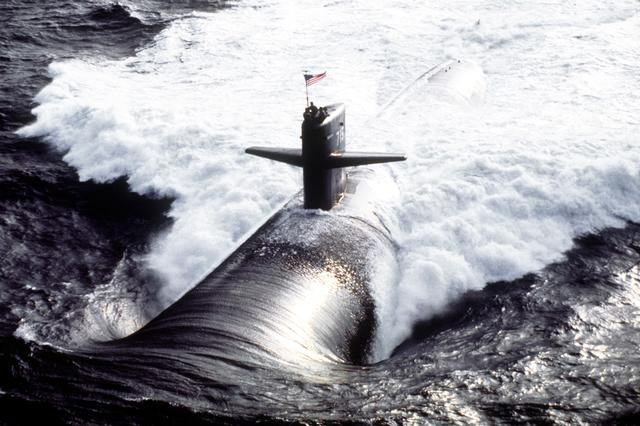
- USS Buffalo (SSN-715)

History

United States
- Name: USS Buffalo
- Namesake: Buffalo, New York
- Builder: Newport News Shipbuilding
- Laid down: 25 January 1980
- Launched: 8 May 1982
- Sponsored by: Joanne Kemp
- Acquired: 27 October 1983
- Commissioned: 5 November 1983
- Decommissioned: 30 January 2019
- Out of service: 30 September 2017
- Stricken: 30 January 2019
- Home port: Puget Sound Naval Shipyard, Bremerton, Washington
- Nickname(s): Silent Thunder
- Status: Pending disposal
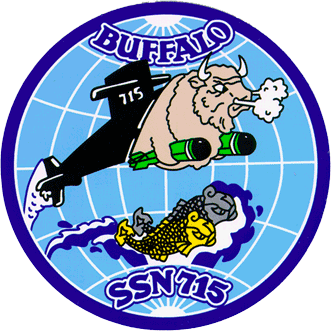
- Badge

General characteristics
- Class & type: Los Angeles-class submarine
- Type: Nuclear attack submarine
- Displacement: 5771 tons light, 6142 tons full, 371 tons dead
- Length: 362 ft (110 m)
- Beam: 33 ft (10 m)
- Draft: 31 ft (9.4 m)
- Propulsion: 1 GE 165 MW S6G PWR nuclear reactor, 2 turbines 35,000 hp (26 MW), 1 auxiliary motor 325 hp (242 kW), 1 shaft
- Speed: Surfaced: 20 knots (23 mph; 37 km/h); Submerged: 20 knots (23 mph; 37 km/h) (official)
- Range: Unlimited
- Endurance: 90 days
- Test depth: 800 ft (240 m)
- Complement: 12 officers, 98 men
- Armament: 4 × 21 in (533 mm) torpedo tubes

USS Buffalo (SSN-715) was a Los Angeles-class submarine, the second vessel that actively served the United States Navy to be named for Buffalo, New York (another USS Buffalo was named for the animal). The contract to build her was awarded to Newport News Shipbuilding and Dry Dock Company in Newport News, Virginia on 23 February 1976, and her keel was laid down on 25 January 1980. She was launched on 8 May 1982 sponsored by Mrs. Joanne Kemp, wife of former Buffalo Bills quarterback and New York's 31st congressional district representative Jack Kemp, who was credited with winning approval to name the ship after the city in his district. Buffalo was commissioned on 5 November 1983, with Commander G. Michael Hewitt in command. Buffalo was decommissioned on 30 January 2019 after 35 years of service.

== Operational history ==
=== 1980s ===
Upon commissioning, Buffalo was assigned to Submarine Squadron 8 in Norfolk, Virginia. In 1984, after a five-month post-shakedown maintenance availability, Buffalo transited through the Panama Canal during a change of homeport to Pearl Harbor, Hawaii, where she was assigned to Submarine Squadron 1.

Buffalo completed her first deployment to the Western Pacific in 1985, where she became the first nuclear-powered submarine to anchor off the coast of Pattaya Beach, Thailand. Buffalo's second Western Pacific deployment came in 1987, after which she was awarded her first Battle Effectiveness Award, which she proceeded to win for three consecutive years. She conducted another Western Pacific deployment from late 1988 to early 1989.

=== 1990s ===
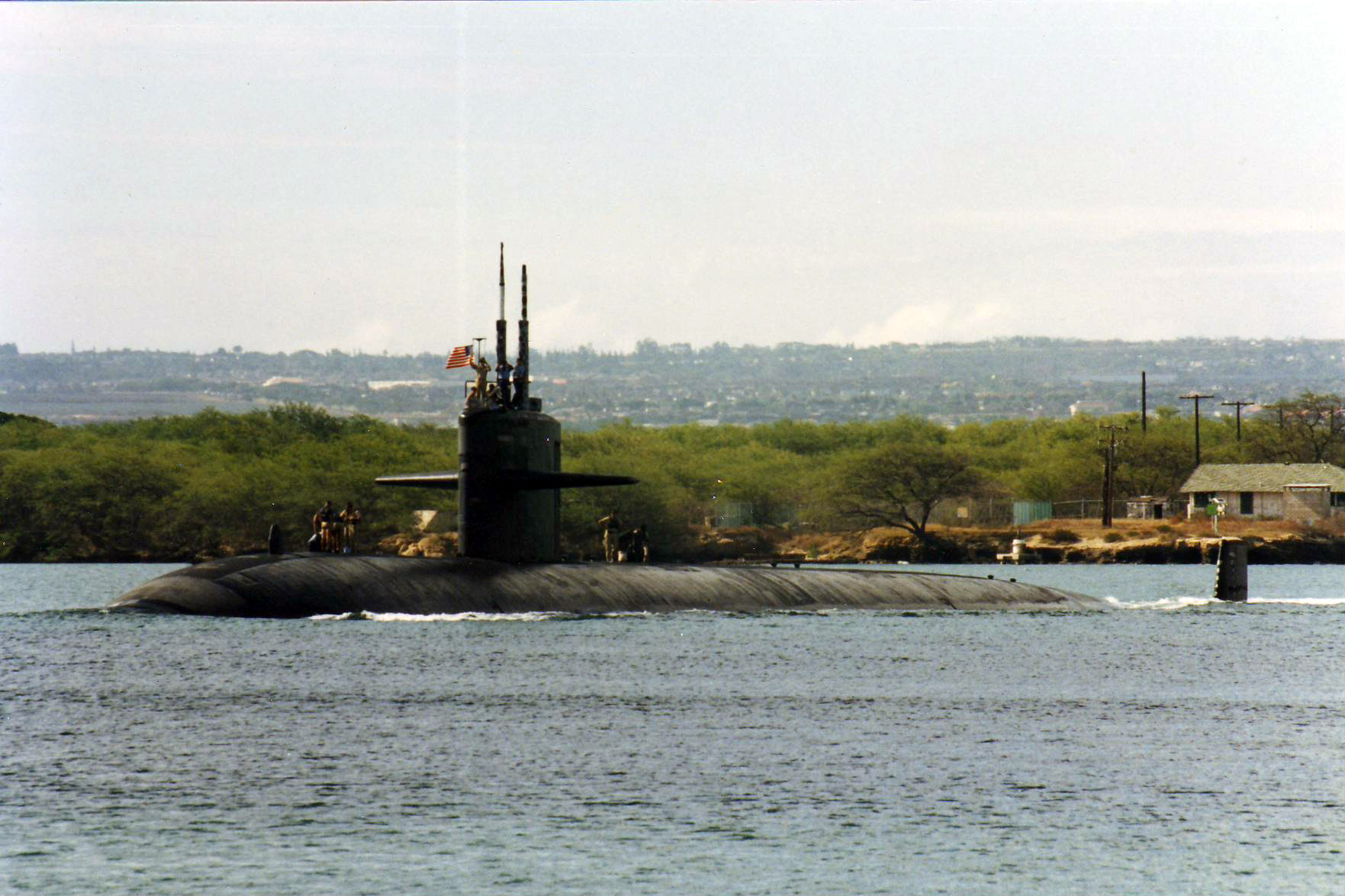
USS Buffalo departing Pearl Harbor, Hawaii, for a western Pacific deployment in 1995

After conducting Western and Eastern Pacific deployments in 1990, the next year Buffalo entered dry-dock in Pearl Harbor Naval Shipyard and began a yearlong Depot Modernization Period during which she was temporarily assigned to Submarine Squadron 7. In the following years, Buffalo conducted numerous deployments to the Eastern and Western Pacific, earning a CNO Letter of Commendation for her 1997 deployment.

Buffalo conducted the first-ever dual Selected Restricted Availability, sharing a dry-dock with the USS Los Angeles (SSN-688) in 1998, followed by an Eastern Pacific deployment that included special Joint Operations with the United States Coast Guard and Canadian Coast Guard, for which she was awarded the Coast Guard Special Operations Ribbon. In 1999, she conducted another Western Pacific deployment, earning the Battle "E" again, which occurred again in 2001.

=== 2000s ===
In 2002, Buffalo entered dry-dock in Pearl Harbor, Hawaii, and became the first ship to undergo the multi-year nuclear refueling process in Hawaii. In late November 2005, the DDS was used to launch an underwater glider capable of gathering and storing information to be later transmitted using a built-in satellite phone.

==== Operations in Guam ====
Buffalo changed homeport again in 2007 to Naval Base Guam, where she operated out of Apra Harbor assigned to Submarine Squadron 15 as one of the Navy's most forward-deployed submarine assets. While stationed in Guam, she conducted 11 missions vital to national security and visited Australia, Philippines, Republic of Korea, Saipan, Japan, Singapore, and Thailand. She won numerous awards including three Battle "E" awards, the prestigious Pacific Fleet Arleigh Burke Fleet Trophy, and a Meritorious Unit Commendation.

=== 2010s ===
==== Return to Hawaii ====
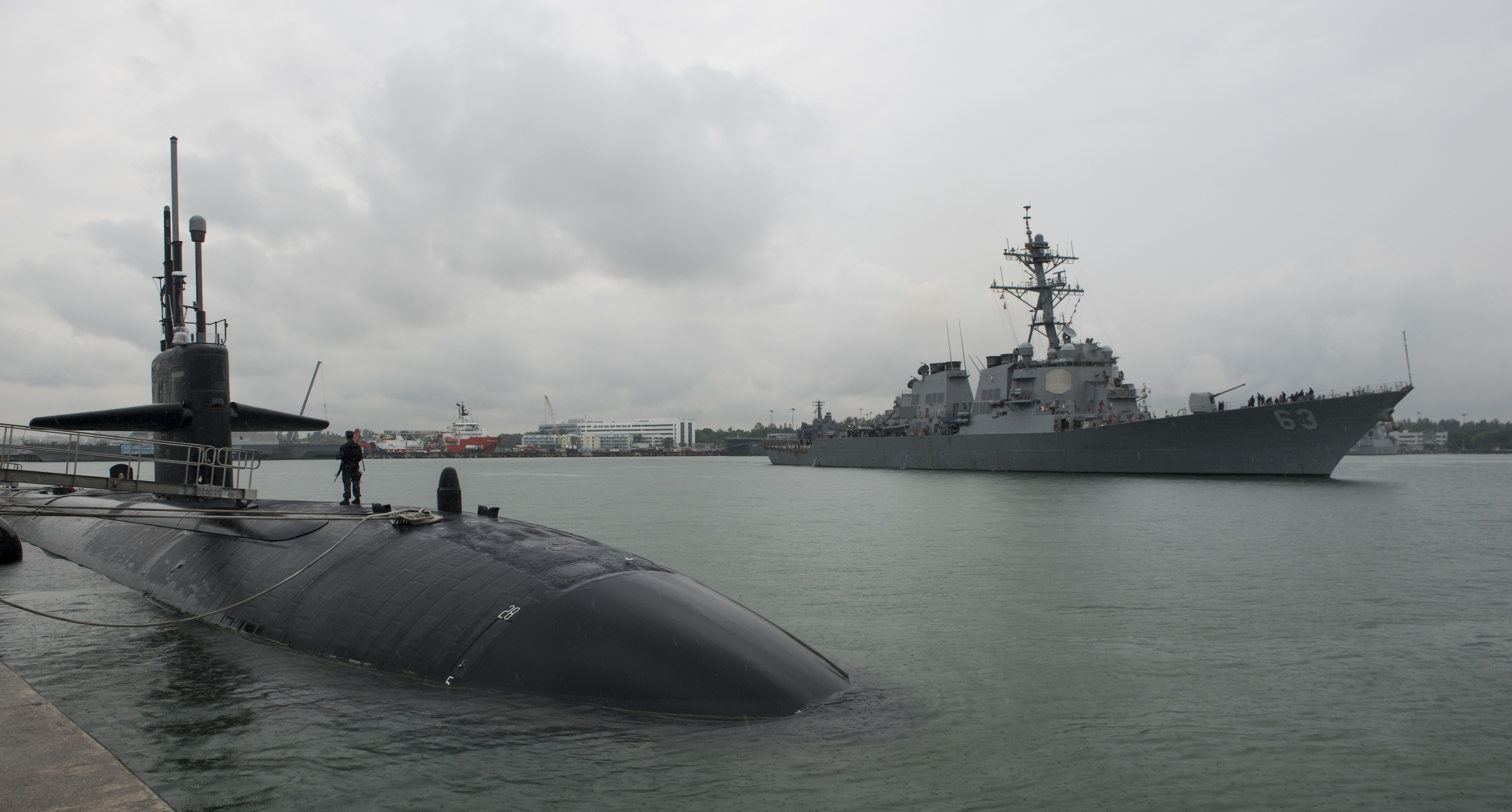
USS Buffalo moored in Changi Naval Base, Singapore during her final deplyoment in 2016.

After five and a half years in Guam, Buffalo returned to Pearl Harbor in early 2013, rejoining Submarine Squadron 1. After completing a 17-month Pre-Inactivation Restricted Availability, on 23 December 2016 Buffalo completed her final Western Pacific deployment prior to scheduled decommissioning, for which she earned a Navy Unit Commendation. On 1 May 2017, Buffalo departed Pearl Harbor for the final time.

==== Inactivation and decommissioning ====
Per the Annual Report to Congress on Long-Range Planning for Construction of Naval Vessels for FY2013, Buffalo was originally scheduled for decommissioning in 2017. On 26 May 2017, Buffalo arrived at Puget Sound Naval Shipyard Friday for inactivation and decommissioning. Buffalo was officially placed in reserve status, inactivated but in commission on 30 September 2017. On 16 July 2018, Buffalo conducted her inactivation ceremony, the final public event prior to the ship's official decommissioning, which would occur within the access-controlled Puget Sound Naval Shipyard. Buffalo was decommissioned on 30 January 2019 and is currently pending disposal.

Portions of the former USS Buffalo, alongside the former USS Providence, are displayed outside the Accelerated Training in Defense Manufacturing building in Danville, Virginia.
