= Pearl Harbor Naval Shipyard =

United States Navy shipyard in Hawaii

Pearl Harbor Naval Shipyard and Intermediate Maintenance Facility
- Pearl Harbor, Hawaii
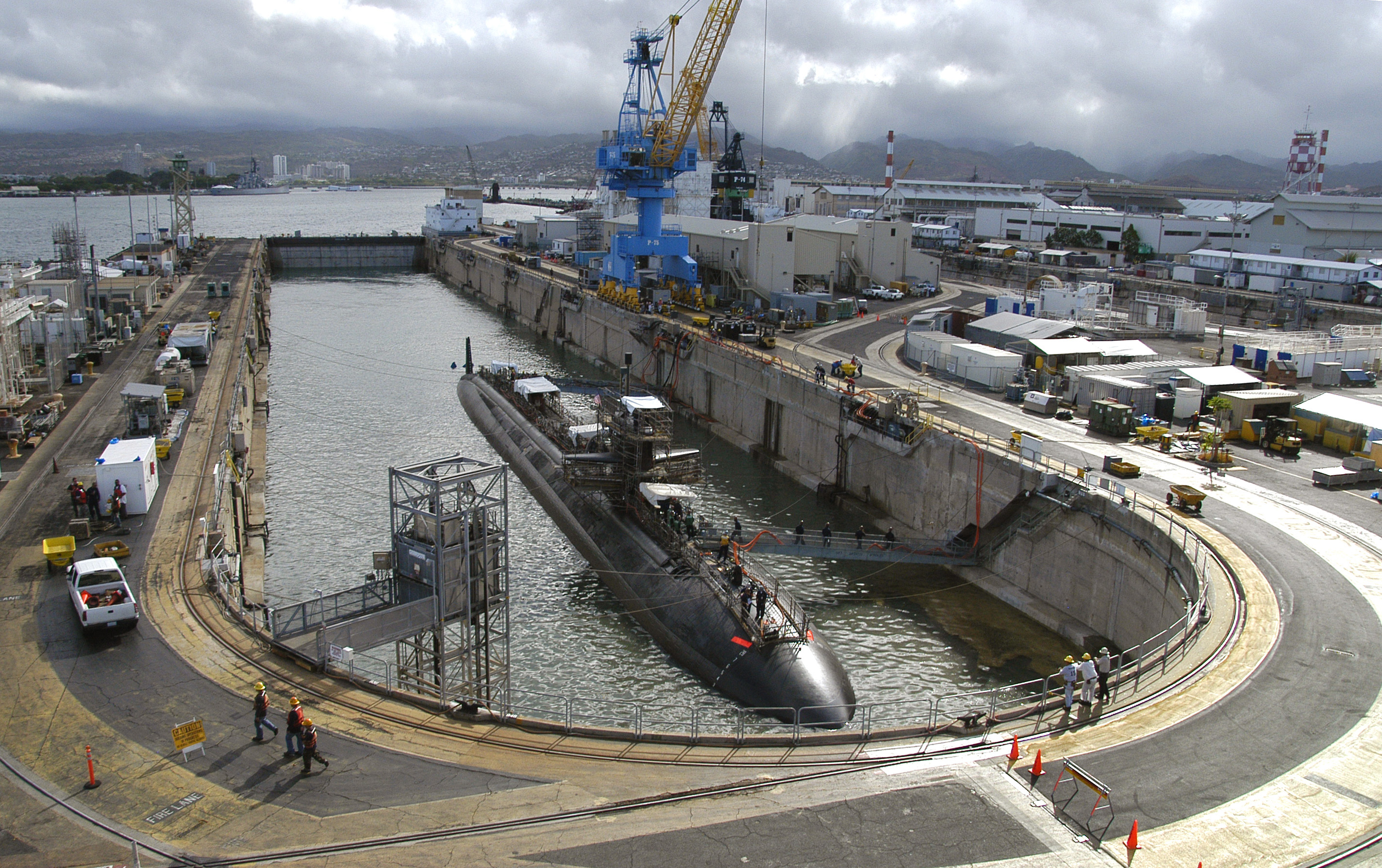
- USS Buffalo in Dry Dock 2 at the Pearl Harbor Naval Shipyard

Site information
- Type: Shipyard
- Controlled by: United States Navy

Location
- Coordinates: 21.351°N 157.957°W

Site history
- Built: 1908
- In use: 1908–present

Garrison information
- Current commander: CAPT Richard Jones (June 2021–present)

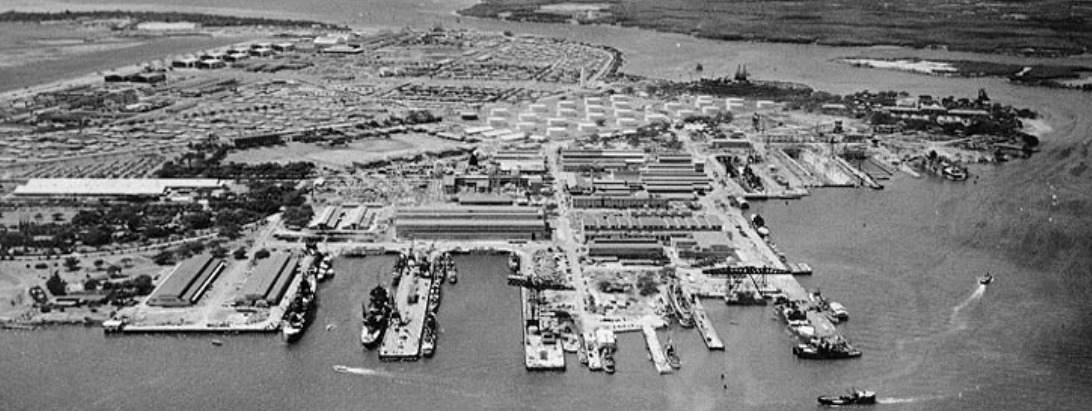
Navy Yard Pearl Harbor in 1941

The Pearl Harbor Naval Shipyard and Intermediate Maintenance Facility is a United States Navy shipyard located in Pearl Harbor, Hawaii on 148 acres. It is one of just four public shipyards operated by the United States Navy. The shipyard is physically a part of Joint Base Pearl Harbor–Hickam.

== History ==
Pearl Harbor started as naval facility and coaling station after a December 9, 1887, agreement. King Kalākaua granted the United States exclusive rights to use Pearl Harbor as a port and repair base. The United States–Hawaii relationship started with the Reciprocity Treaty of 1875, a free trade agreement. The Naval Station had existed in Pearl Harbor since 1898, but in 1908 the United States Congress allocated $3 million to build the shipyard, then called Navy Yard Pearl Harbor. The shipyard grew quickly, and work began on the first drydock, which collapsed before opening in 1913. After rebuilding, Dry Dock #1 was opened August 21, 1919. Through these years, the shipyard was just a part of the Naval Station. The shipyard officially became its own entity in December 1941 as part of the Navy's effort to separate military from industrial operations. The shipyard is on the shore of East Loch across from Ford Island. The Navy built 1010 dock, a 1010-foot wharf at the Navy Yard that had berth B-1, B-2 and B-3. Later 1010 dock was lengthened to longer than 1010 feet. The ships USS Helena and USS Oglala (that sank) were docked during the attack. Bravo Docks, are a 2,900-foot wharf at the Navy Yard with berth B-22 to B-26. The destroyer USS Bagley was at Bravo Dock in the attack. Navy Yard has Pearl Harbor berths B-1 to B-26.

The shipyard has grown to four dry docks, which are mainly used for repairing and maintaining nuclear submarines. The shipyard has about 5,800 civilian employees and 500 military personnel.

== Dry docks ==
Dock No.	Material of which dock is constructed	Length	Width	Depth	Date completed	Source
1	Concrete	1,002 feet 5 inches (305.54 m)	138 feet (42 m)	35 feet (11 m)	1919	
2	Concrete	1,000 feet 6 inches (304.95 m)	147 feet (45 m)	46 feet 6 inches (14.17 m)	1941	
3	Concrete	497 feet 6 inches (151.64 m)	104 feet (32 m)	23 feet (7.0 m)	1942	
4	Concrete	1,088 feet 6 inches (331.77 m)	155 feet (47 m)	48 feet 6 inches (14.78 m)	1943 (on Hospital Point)	

== Naval Inactive Ship Maintenance Facility ==
The Naval Inactive Ship Maintenance Facility (NISMF) at Pearl Harbor, Hawaii, ports logistic support cargo ships and amphibious transport dock ships. The NISMF Pearl Harbor ships are kept afloat and in fair working order, so they can be reactivated for emergency use. Some of the ships are decommissioned US Navy ships and are pending determination of their final fate. Naval Inactive Ship Maintenance Facility is part of the United States Navy reserve fleets.

== World War II ==
In December 1939 a contract was awarded for two reinforced concrete drydocks. The new dock were to be built next to the existing 1919 battleship dock. The new Dock No. 2 was also a battleship dock at 1,000 feet long and 133 feet wide. The new Dock No. 3, for destroyers and submarines, work in 497 feet long and 84 feet wide. On December 7, 1941, Dock No. 2 was complete and Dock No. 3 was halfway completed. Dock No. 1 was damaged by the burning of the destroyers USS Cassin and USS Downes in the attack. In the attack 21 ships were damaged and/or sunk. Only two were not worked on at the yard. The Auxiliary floating drydock USS YFD-2 was sunk in the attack with destroyer USS Shaw (DD-373) in for repair. Dock No. 2 was the only drydock working after the attack, and it still have some finished work to be done. By December 10 the cruiser USS Helena in Dock No. 2 for repair until the 21st. At the same time Dock No. 2 was complete. On October 4, 1941 a CPFF contract was made for the construction of Dock No. 4, 1,100 feet long and 147 feet wide . The contract also included a power plant and mooring for aircraft carriers at the shipyard. Dock No. 4 was ready for use by July 19, 1943. With the Pacific War's vast fleet a marine railway was completed on September 15, 1943 for work on destroyers and submarines. Work on the marine railway was started on January 1, 1943. The marine railway was 3,000-ton, 836-foot long.

The shipyard had vast salvage work after the attack, both to repair damaged vessels still afloat and to raise sunk or capsized ships. Repairs to damaged vessels included USS Pennsylvania, USS Maryland, USS Tennessee, USS Helena, USS Honolulu, USS Raleigh, USS Vestal, and USS Curtiss. Other ships had to be raised and repaired: USS Shaw, USS Nevada, USS California, USS West Virginia, USS Oglala, USS Oklahoma, and USS YFD-2. The USS Arizona (BB-39) was too badly damaged to be repaired and the USS Utah (BB-31) salvage was stopped. USS Oklahoma was salvaged but not put back in service due to her age. The shipyard did not have all the material and equipment to do the salvage operations and had to be shipped from the mainland, arriving in February 1942. The USS Nevada was patched with supplies at the shipyard by drydock workers and placed in the working drydock.

The Pacific Bridge Company was given charge for the repairs of YFD-2. Divers had to repair more than 200 holes in YFD-2 to float her again. Repaired, the YFD-2 raised the USS Shaw for 10 days of repairs to install a new temporary bow so Shaw could return to the naval shipyard at Mare Island at Vallejo, California for final repairs. YFD-2 was used for salvaging and repairing many of the ships damaged on 7 December 1941, as she could raise any ship here, other than the large new battleships.

Post World War II, in the Korean War (1950–1953) some ships in the United States Navy reserve fleets returned to active duty after being overhauled at the shipyard and Sea trial by the base. With the Vietnam War (1955–1975) the base was again busy with support efforts. The Cold War (1947-1991) and the 600-ship Navy had Naval Base Hawaii active.

== December 4, 2019 shooting ==
On December 4, 2019, a 22-year-old, male sailor opened fire with his M4 carbine service rifle, killing two Department of Defense civilian workers and injuring another, then immediately killed himself with his Beretta M9 service pistol. A Pacific Air Chiefs Symposium was hosted at the naval air station during this time. Officials and military leadership from 18 nations across the Indo-Pacific gathered for the 2019 Pacific Air Chiefs Symposium at Pacific Air Force Headquarters from December 3 to December 6. It was hosted by General David Goldfein, US Air Force Chief of Staff and General CQ Brown Jr., PACF Commander.

== See also ==
- Naval Base Hawaii
- US Naval Advance Bases
- USS Arizona Memorial
- Pearl Harbor National Memorial
