= HMS Hecla (1815) =

19th-century British Royal Navy bomb vessel

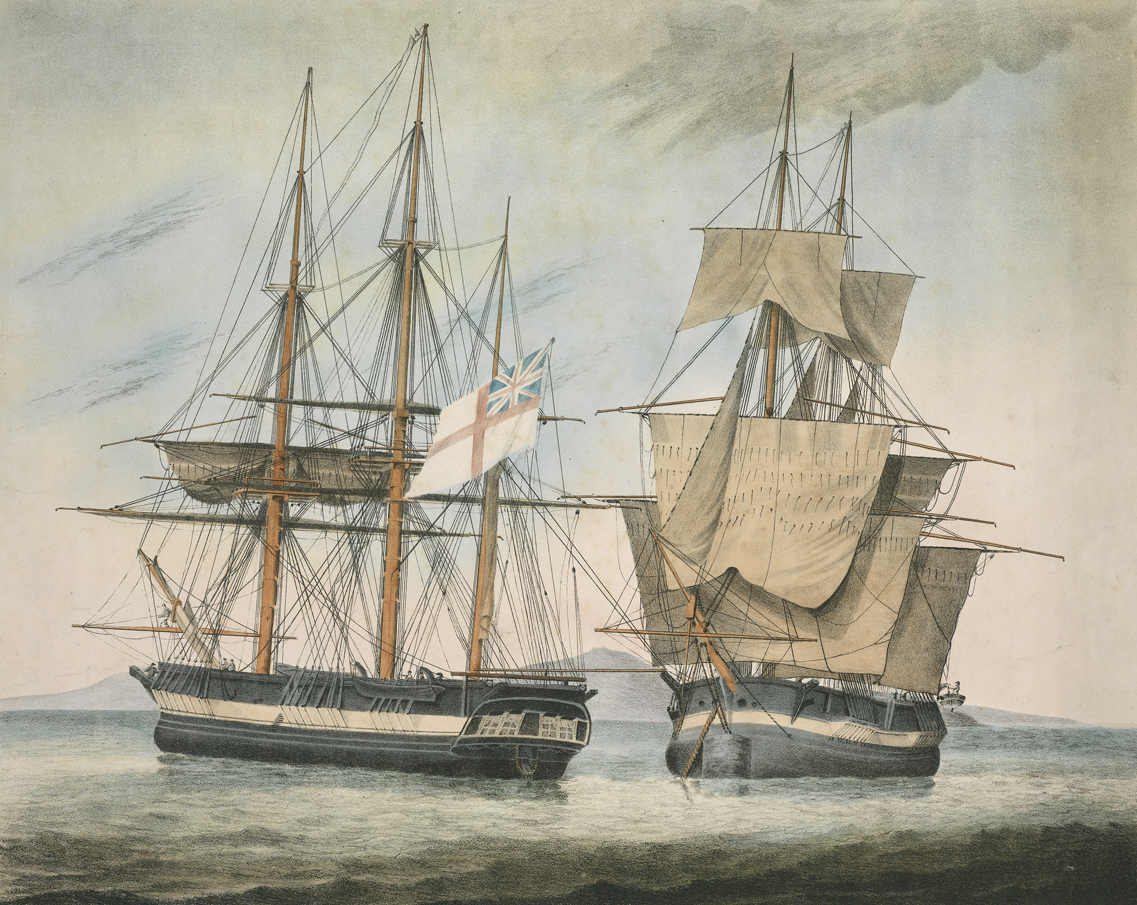
- Lithograph depicting HMS Hecla and HMS Fury, by Arthur Parsey, 1823

History

United Kingdom
- Name: HMS Hecla
- Namesake: Hekla
- Ordered: 5 June 1813
- Builder: Barkworth & Hawkes, North Barton, Hull
- Laid down: July 1813
- Launched: 22 July 1815
- Honours and awards: Naval General Service Medal with clasp "Algiers"
- Fate: Sold, 13 April 1831

United Kingdom
- Name: Hecla
- Acquired: 1831 by purchase
- Fate: Wrecked 23 June 1840

General characteristics
- Class & type: Hecla-class bomb vessel; Arctic discovery vessel, 1819–1827; Survey ship, 1827–1831
- Tons burthen: 37526/94, or 404 (bm)
- Length: 105 ft (32.0 m) (overall); 86 ft 1 1/4 in (26.2 m) (keel)
- Beam: 28 ft 7 1/2 in (8.7 m)
- Depth of hold: 13 ft 10 1/2 in (4.2 m)
- Propulsion: Sails
- Sail plan: Full-rigged
- Complement: 67
- Armament: 10 × 24-pounder carronades; 2 × 6-pounder guns; 1 × 13-inch (330 mm) mortar; 1 × 10-inch (250 mm) mortar

HMS Hecla was a Royal Navy Hecla-class bomb vessel launched in 1815. Like many other bomb vessels, she was named for a volcano, in this case Hekla in southern Iceland. She served at the Bombardment of Algiers in 1816. Subsequently, she took part in three expeditions to the Arctic. She then served as a survey vessel on the coast of West Africa until she was sold in 1831. She became a merchantman and in 1834 a Greenland whaler. She was wrecked in 1840.

== Ship history ==
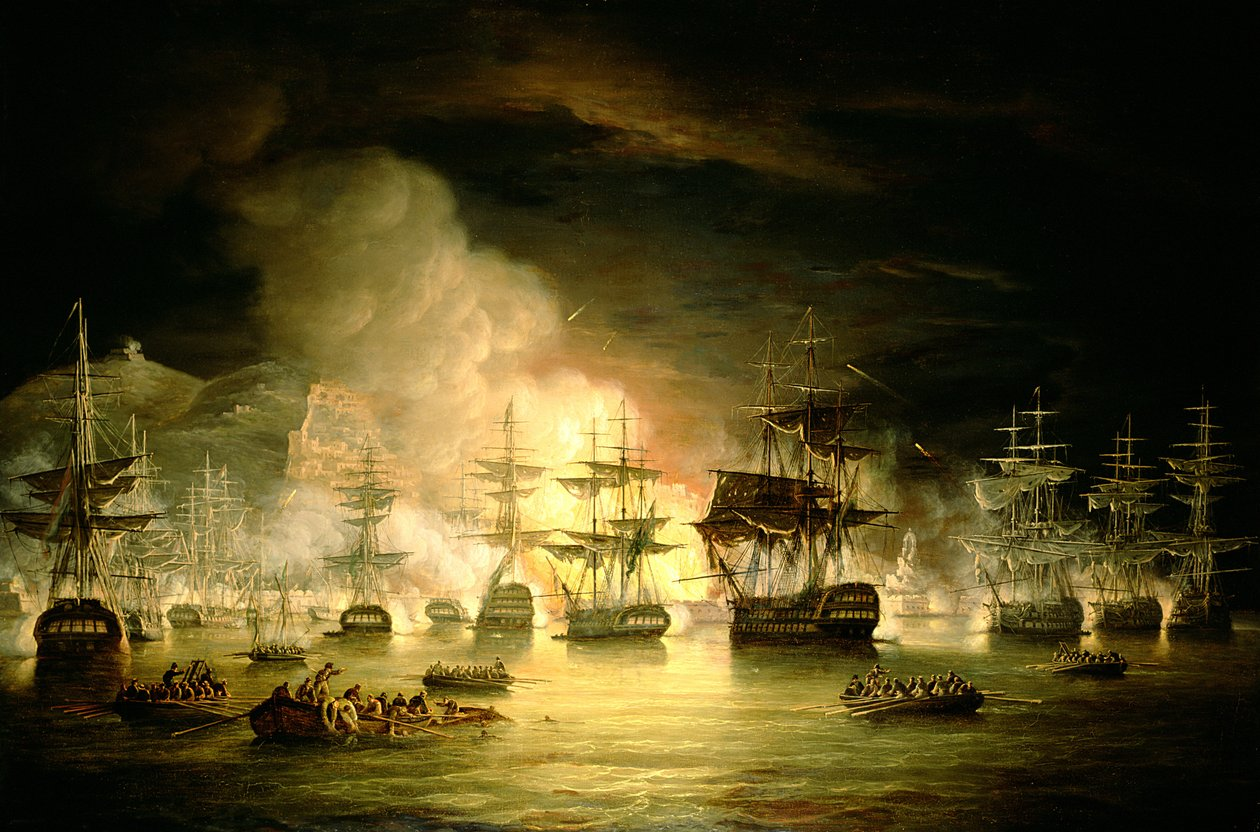
The Bombardment of Algiers by Thomas Luny

Commander William Popham commissioned Hecla for service in the Mediterranean. Hecla saw wartime service as part of the Anglo-Dutch fleet at the bombardment of Algiers on 27 August 1816. In 1847 the Admiralty authorised the award of the Naval General Service Medal with clasp "Algiers" to all surviving claimants from the battle.

== Arctic exploration ==
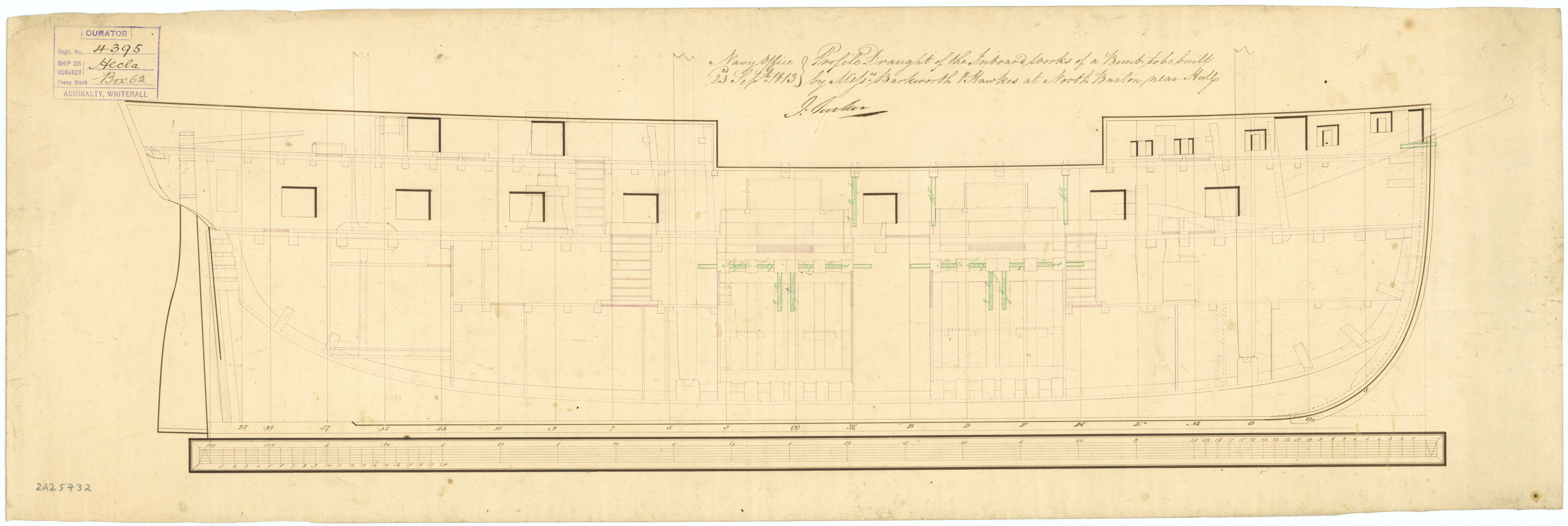
Profile draught of the inboard works of a Hecla-class vessel to be built by Barkworth & Hawkes at North Barton near Hull; signed Navy Office 23 September 1813

In early 1819 she was converted to an Arctic exploration ship and made three journeys to the Arctic in search of the Northwest Passage, and made one attempt on the North Pole, all under Lieutenant William Edward Parry or Commander George Francis Lyon, and spent many winters iced in without serious damage.

On the first journey, from May 1819 until December 1820 Hecla was commanded by Parry. She and her companion ship, the gun brig Griper, reached a longitude 112°51' W before backtracking to winter off Melville Island. No ship was able to travel so far west again in a single season until 1910, when Joseph-Elzéar Bernier reached Cape Dundas on Melville Island. The second year, the two ships reached longitude 113°46' W before returning to England.

On her second expedition, from May 1821 until November 1823, Hecla was under Lyon's command while Parry led the overall expedition from her sister ship Fury. The furthest point on this trip, the perpetually frozen strait between Foxe Basin and the Gulf of Boothia, was named after the two ships: Fury and Hecla Strait.

Ice conditions frustrated Hecla's third expedition to the Canadian Arctic, which took place from May 1824 to October 1825, again in the company of Fury. Hecla was again under the command of Parry, who now was a captain. Fury was badly damaged at Prince Regent Inlet and had to be abandoned.

In 1827, Parry used Hecla for an unsuccessful attempt to reach the North Pole from Spitsbergen by boat, reaching 82°45' N. Following this voyage, Hecla was withdrawn from Arctic service.

Commander Thomas Boteler was appointed captain of Hecla in December 1827. She then was engaged in surveying the West African Coast in 1828–31. After Boteler's death in November 1829, Commander F. Harding became her captain.

Hecla was put up for sale in 1831 at Woolwich. She was sold in April for £1,990 to Sir E. Banks.

== Merchantman and whaler ==
Hecla entered Lloyd's Register (LR) in 1831 with R. Jumson, master, Banerman, owner, and trade London–St Petersburg. She underwent repairs in 1832 and then became a merchantman. The Register of Shipping for 1833 shows her with Allen, master, Banerman, owner, and trade Liverpool–Savannah.

Banerman used her for one season in 1834 as a northern seas whaler. Under the command of Captain Reid she caught five whales, yielding 63 tun of whale oil, in the Davis Strait. In 1835 Banerman sold her to Kirkcaldy. Hecla was operating out of Kirkcaldy when she was lost in 1840. A gale on 23 June 1840 drove her against ice floes, crushing her.

Hecla still appeared in LR for 1845 with M. Wright, master, Elder & Co. owner, and trade Leith–Davis Strait. Her homeport was Kirkcaldy, and her entry included the remark "wants repair". It had the annotation, "wrecked".
