= George Francis Lyon =

English naval officer and explorer (1796–1832)

George Francis Lyon FRS
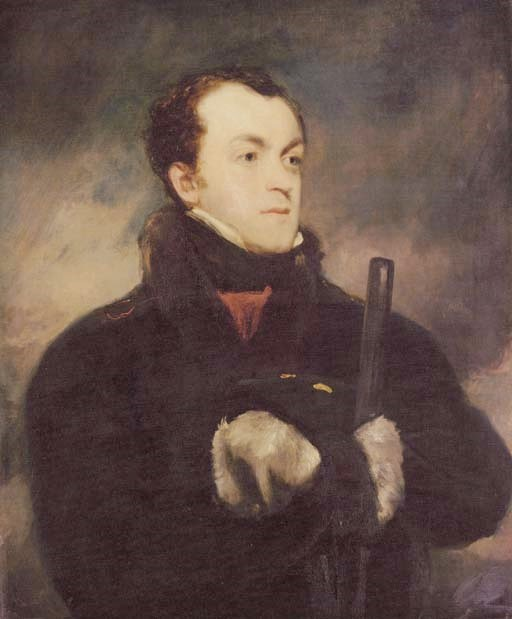
- Portrait by John Jackson
- Born: 23 January 1796; Chichester, England
- Died: 8 October 1832 (aged 36); Atlantic Ocean
- Other name: Said-ben-Abdallah
- Military career
- Branch: Royal Navy
- Years of service: 1808–1832
- Rank: Captain
- Commands: HMS Hecla, HMS Griper

George Francis Lyon FRS (23 January 1796 – 8 October 1832) was an English naval officer and explorer of Africa and the Arctic. While not having a particularly distinguished career, he is remembered for the entertaining journals he kept and for the pencil drawings he completed in the Arctic; this information was useful to later expeditions.

== Early life ==
He was born in Chichester, the elder son of Lieutenant Colonel George Lyon of the 11th Light Dragoons and Louisa Alexandrina Hart. She was in turn the second daughter of Sir William Neville Hart and Elizabeth Aspinwall. He was educated at Burney's Academy in Gosport, Hampshire.

== Naval career ==
After joining the Royal Navy he was entered on the books of HMS Royal William at Spithead in 1808 before going to sea aboard HMS Milford.

=== Niger River ===
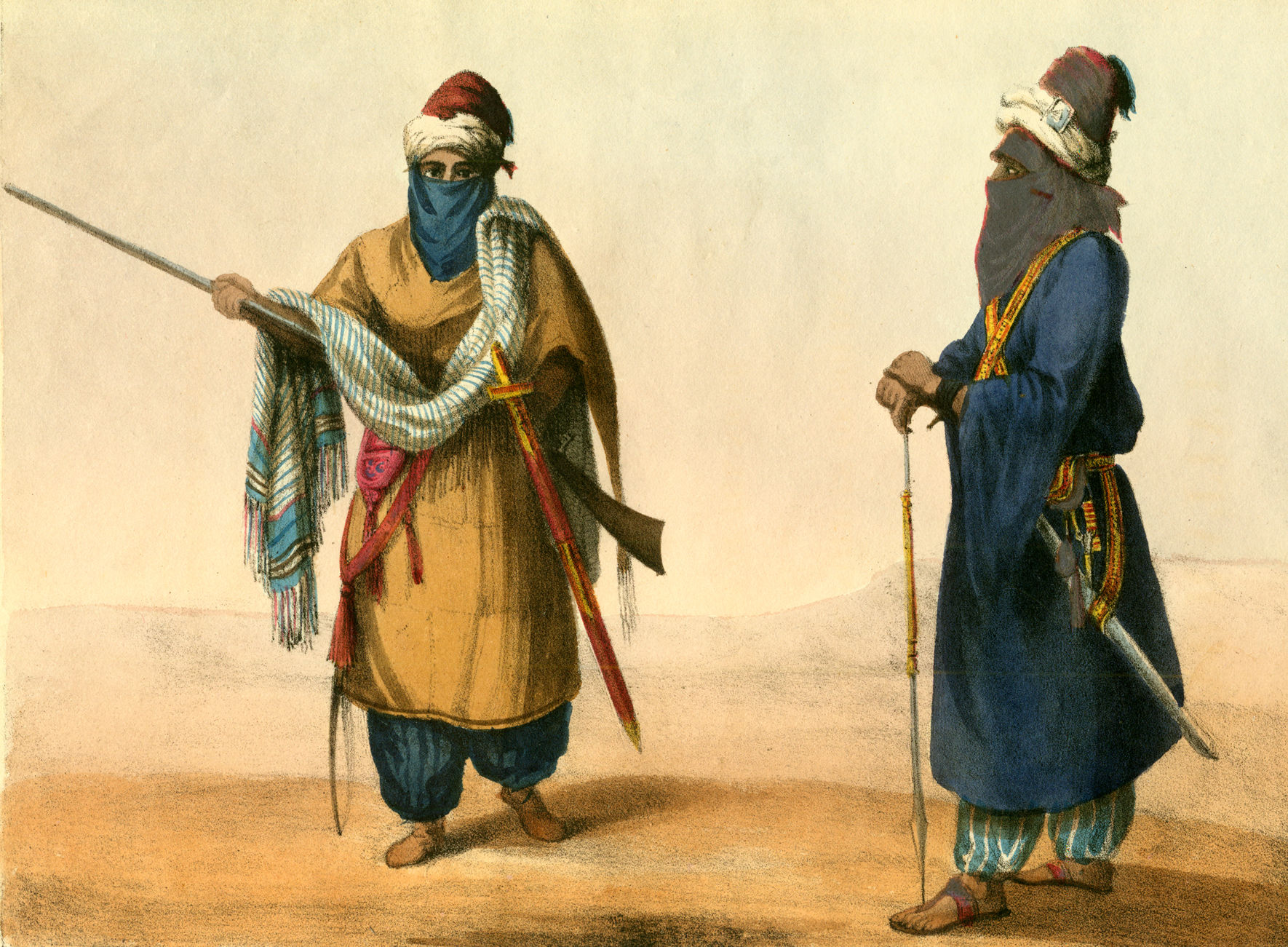
Tuareg people, by Lyon

In 1818, he was sent along with Joseph Ritchie by Sir John Barrow to find the course of the Niger River and the location of Timbuktu. The expedition was underfunded, lacked support and because the ideas of John Barrow departed from Tripoli and thus had to cross the Sahara as part of their journey.

A year later, due to much officialdom they had only got as far as Murzuk where they both fell ill. Ritchie never recovered and died there, but Lyon survived and travelled a little further around the region. Exactly a year to the day he left, he arrived back in Tripoli, the expedition being a complete failure.

=== Northwest Passage ===
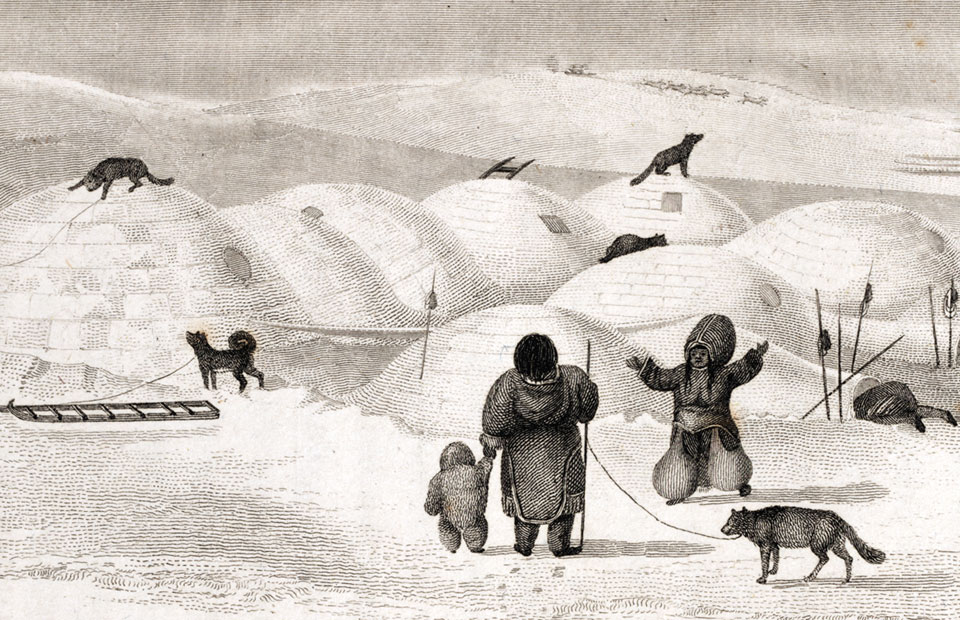
An Inuit igloo village, by Lyon

Having been promised a promotion on his return, he now set about trying to pester the Admiralty into fulfilling their promise. He irritated enough people that his reward was, in 1821, to be given the command of HMS Hecla under William Edward Parry on his second attempt at the Northwest Passage. Among Lyon's lieutenants was Henry Parkyns Hoppner. The expedition also included Francis Crozier and James Clark Ross. Lyon received his promotion to captain on his return.

In 1824, he was given command of HMS Griper, a ship that had proved itself a poor Arctic vessel on William Edward Parry's 1819 expedition. His goal was to sail to Hudson Bay and then north through Roes Welcome Sound to Repulse Bay and then go overland through unknown country to reach John Franklin's furthest east at Point Turnagain on the Kent Peninsula. The Inuit had told Parry that there was salt water three days' walk to the west, but this was apparently the Gulf of Boothia.

Hudson Bay was unusually ice-filled, and on 1 September 1824, near Cape Fullerton, just west of the entrance to Roes Welcome Sound, a storm drove the ship onto a rock or iceberg. All hands expected the ship to sink but when the gale died down it was still afloat. On 12 September, Griper was forced to anchor offshore in a gale with heavy seas and snow. It lost its anchor cables and the masts and rigging were badly damaged. Lyon took three weeks to work the hulk out of Hudson Bay. Arriving at Spithead without anchors the ship only stopped when it fouled a three-decker's mooring cables.

== Later life and death ==
While he was well known in society, this last failure effectively saw him blacklisted in the Royal Navy and he never had another command. Having been made an honorary Doctor of Civil Laws (DCL) by the University of Oxford in 1825, he was elected a Fellow of the Royal Society on 15 November 1827. He died on 8 October 1832, on board the packet boat Emulous en route from Buenos Aires to Britain to be treated for eye problems.

== Personal life ==
He married Lucy Louisa, younger daughter of the Irish revolutionary Lord Edward Fitzgerald, on 5 September 1825. They had a daughter, Lucy Pamela Sophia Lyon, born in September 1826. Lucy Louisa Lyon died that same month, while her husband was away in Mexico. He did not find out about her death until he landed at Holyhead, having survived the wreck of the ship bringing him home. His daughter went on to marry Reverend Thomas Ovens in 1849, had three children, and died in 1904.

An aspect of his personality that was rare at the time was his genuine interest in the "natives" of the countries he visited. Wearing a thawb and learning fluent Arabic, he managed to blend in with the inhabitants of North Africa; he was tattooed by the Inuit in the Arctic, using needle and sooty thread, and ate raw caribou and seal meat with them. The expedition achieved little, spending two years in the Arctic and getting only as far the Fury and Hecla Strait before being stopped by ice. But the information recorded about the Inuit tribes that he met proved valuable to later generations of anthropologists, such as Franz Boas and Knud Rasmussen, who relied on his journals as a reference point for their own observations.

== Publications ==
- A Narrative of Travels in Northern Africa in the Years 1818, 19, and 20..., London (1821) Gutenberg
- The Private Journal of Captain G.F. Lyon, of H.M.S. Hecla, During the Recent Voyage of Discovery under Captain Parry, London (1824)
- A Brief Narrative of an Unsuccessful Attempt To Reach Repulse Bay In His Majesty's Ship Griper, In The Year MDCCCXXIV, London (1825)
- Journal of a residence and tour in the Republic of Mexico in the year 1826, (Vol. 1, Vol. 2) London (1828)
