= HMS North Star (1810) =

British ship

- North Star

History

United Kingdom
- Name: HMS North Star
- Namesake: The North Star
- Ordered: 19 October 1805
- Builder: Benjamin Tanner, Dartmouth (completed by John Cock after Tanner's bankruptcy)
- Laid down: May 1806
- Launched: 21 April 1810
- Fate: Sold 1817

United Kingdom
- Name: Columbo
- Namesake: Colombo
- Owner: Joad & Co.
- Acquired: 1817 by purchase
- Fate: Condemned 1822

General characteristics
- Class & type: Revived Cormorant-class sloop
- Tons burthen: 43328/94 or 43820/94, or 440 (bm)
- Length: Overall:108 ft 4 5/8 in (33.0 m), or 112 ft 10 in (34.4 m); Keel:90 ft 0 1/8 in (27.4 m)
- Beam: 30 ft 1 in (9.2 m), or 30 ft 3 in (9.2 m)
- Depth of hold: 9 ft 0 in (2.7 m)
- Complement: 121 (Royal Navy)
- Armament: Upper deck:16 × 32-pounder carronades; QD:6 × 18-pounder carronades; Fc:2 × 6-pounder chase guns + 2 × 18-pounder carronades

HMS North Star was a ship launched in 1810 and spent much of her naval career on the Jamaica Station. The Navy sold her in 1817 and she became the merchantman Columbo. Columbo sailed between Britain and India under a license from the British East India Company (EIC) until she was damaged in 1822 while returning from Ceylon. She was condemned at Point de Galle and sold there for breaking up.

== Royal Navy ==
The Navy commissioned North Star under Commander Thomas Coe. He received promotion to post captain in April 1811 and at that time the Navy reclassed her as a post ship of 20 guns. Lloyd's List (LL) reported on 27 September 1811 that North Star had detained the Spanish ship Viscount Wellington, Wickes, master. Viscount Wellington had been sailing from Amelia Island to Deptford and North Star set her into Rasgate.

On 10 May 1812 North Star was in company with Sophie when they captured Brick.

North Star sailed for the Leeward Islands on 6 June 1813.

On 14 November 1813 North Star detained Lindsay, Winder, master, and carried her into Jamaica. Lindsay had been on her way from St Domingo to London. She was liberated (released).

In January 1814 Hippolyta, Hill, master, was on her way from Hull to Montego Bay, Jamaica, when she ran aground and lost her rudder near Montego Bay. North Star towed her off.

Franklin, of New York, Thomas, master, foundered on 7 November while sailing from Lisbon. North Star rescued the crew. On 14 November North Star recaptured the schooner Saucy Jack, jun.. North Star's boats recaptured the Jamaica sloops Jane and Friends off the north coast of Cuba. The American privateer Saucy Jack had captured the sloops, which North Star sent into Montego Bay, where they arrived on 30 November.

In November 1815 Commander George Bentham replaced Coe on the Jamaica Station. Bentham received promotion to captain in September 1816.

Disposal: The "Principal Officers and Commissioners of His Majesty's Navy" offered the "North Star sloop, of 433 tons", lying at Deptford, for sale on 30 January 1817. The Navy finally sold North Star on 6 March 1817 to Thomas Pitman for £1010 for breaking up. However she was resold into mercantile service.

== Mercantile service ==
In 1817 C. Joad & Co., purchased North Star and renamed her Columbo (or Colombo). The EIC had in 1813 lost its monopoly on the trade between Britain and India and numerous ship owners put their vessels into that trade, sailing under a license from the EIC.

Columbo underwent a thorough repair in 1817 and first appeared in Lloyd's Register in 1818 with T. Webb, master, Joad & Co., owner, and trade London−Bombay. She may have undergone some lengthening as her burthen and length after 1817 are slightly greater than those of her naval service.

On 29 September 1818 Columbo was at 17°46′N 28°13′W, on her was back to Britain from Bombay and Saint Helena. She encountered Lord Hobart Packet, returning from the Brazils, and informed Lord Hobart Packet of the loss of Calbibia in July, together with Calbibia's captain and 12 crew.

Lloyd's Register for 1819 showed Columbo's master changing from T. Webb to Richardson, and her trade from London−Bombay to London transport. By the 1823 volume of Lloyd's Register (published in 1822), her trade was Liverpool–Bombay.

== Loss ==
On 6 April 1822 Colombo was at Pointe de Galle, Ceylon. She had been badly damaged after striking a rock. She was surveyed there, condemned as a constructive total loss, and sold for breaking up. Part of her cargo, which was damaged, was also to be sold. Columbo, Richardson, master, had been sailing from Columbo to Mauritius and London.
