= Lady Boringdon (1804 ship) =

Merchant and naval vessel launched 1804

History

United Kingdom
- Name: Lady Boringdon
- Owner: 1815:J. Slade
- Launched: 1804, Great Yarmouth
- Fate: Sold to Colombia in 1822

Gran Colombia
- Name: Constitución
- Owner: Navy of Gran Colombia
- Acquired: 1822 by purchase
- Fate: Currently unknown

General characteristics
- Tons burthen: 390, or 393, or 39376/94 (bm)
- Length: 111 ft 10 in (34.1 m)
- Beam: 28 ft 6 in (8.7 m)
- Propulsion: Sail
- Armament: 14 × 18-pounder carronades

Lady Boringdon (or Lady Borringdon), was launched at Great Yarmouth in 1804, possibly under another name. She does not appear in the registers until 1815. She then became an East Indiaman, sailing under a license from the British East India Company (EIC). In 1822 she was sold to the Colombian Government and became the naval brig Constitución; her ultimate fate is currently unknown.

== Career ==
Although Lady Borringdon was launched in 1804, she did not appear in the Register of Shipping or Lloyd's Register until 1815. Both showed her master as T. Sampson, her owner as J. Slade, and her trade as Plymouth–Trinidad. In addition, the Register of Shipping gave her armament and noted that she had undergone a large repair in 1814.

In 1814 the EIC lost its monopoly on the trade between Britain and India. A number of shipowners put their vessels into the trade, sailing under a license from the EIC. Lady Boringdon's appearance in the 1815 registers (published in 1814), may have represented such a repositioning. The Register of Shipping for 1816 showed her master changing from Sampson to Lethbridge, and her trade from London–Trinidad to London–Cape of Good Hope. Lloyd's Register showed her sailing to Bombay, having left in February 1817.

On 23 March 1821, Lady Flora was at the Cape of Good Hope when a gale came up. Lady Borringdon parted from her three anchors and ran into Lady Flora, but caused little damage. Lady Flora gave Lady Borringdon an anchor.

On 27 February 1821, the representative of the New Granada Patriots in London, Luis López Méndez (the Extraordinary and Plenipotentiary Minister of Venezuela), agreed to a loan of £150,000 from the merchant Ewan Mackintosh to cover the purchase of arms and equipment for 10,000 men, and three vessels. López Méndez was not authorized to sign such an agreement and Mackintosh may have known it. The Colombia government never ratified the agreement.

Mackintosh acquired three vessels, Tarántula, Lady Boringdon, and Spey, and in 1822 sent them out. Lloyd's Register for 1823 showed Lady Boringdon with R. Sherwood, master, J. M'Intosh, owner, and trade London–New Orleans.

The Colombians initially refused to accept the cargo, but the fall of Maracaibo to the Royalists on 7 September 1822, caused them to change their minds. They then took the equipment and took over the three vessels for their navy. Tarantula appears to have retained her name. Lady Boringdon may have become Constitución, and Spey Boyacá. (Note: In December 1824, eight months after it had signed a treaty of amity and commerce with the United Kingdom, the Colombian Government signed an agreement to pay MacIntosh £187,500 for the supplies and the three vessels he had bought. The Colombian government made only a partial payment until in 1851 it signed a new agreement to pay £150,000 in bonds receivable for customs duties. The matter was finally settled in 1873 when Colombia made the last of several installment payments. Although Colombia ended up paying much more than the original loan due to cumulative interest payments, Mackintosh received none of the money as he had died.) In July 1822 Lady Boringdon's registration in London was cancelled.

In 1823 Constitución participated in the Battle of Lake Maracaibo.

A list of vessels making up a Colombian squadron cruising in the Gulf of Maracaibo in 1823 under the command of Rene Beluche included "Lady Barrington ship", of 27 guns and 200 men. (Note: This appears to be a mis-identification for Lady Boringdon as Lloyd's List for the time period showed no Lady Barrington.)
