= Thetis (1813 Chittagong ship) =

British merchant ship built in India 1813–1816

History

United Kingdom
- Name: Thetis
- Namesake: Thetis; Countess of Loudoun
- Owner: Hammond & Co.
- Builder: James Macrase, Chittagong
- Launched: 4 January 1813
- Renamed: Countess of Loudoun
- Fate: Wrecked 1816

General characteristics
- Tons burthen: 460, or 466, or 481, of 48131/94, or 482(bm)
- Length: 111 ft 4 in (33.9 m)
- Beam: 31 ft 9 in (9.7 m)
- Armament: 1815:14 × 12-pounder carronades; 1816:4 × 12-pounder carronades
- Notes: Teak-built

Thetis was launched at Chittagong in 1813. At some point she was renamed Countess of Loudoun (or Countess of Loudon, or erroneously Countess of London) for Flora Mure-Campbell, Marchioness of Hastings, Countess of Loudoun. She wrecked in early November 1816 off Palawan.

Countess of Loudon was admitted to the Registry of Great Britain in 1814.

Countess of Loudoun appears in the Register of Shipping for 1815 with Hammond, master and owner, and trade London–Île de France The next year her trade was London−India

Countess of Loudon was sailing from Bengal to China with a cargo of cotton when she struck a shoal during the night in early November 1816. She went over the shoal but was bilged. The water rose to her ports and the crew had to abandon her. She was sailing in company with Susan, which saved Countess's crew.
