= Thomas Durham (1813 ship) =

UK merchant ship 1813–1821

History

United Kingdom
- Name: Thomas Durham
- Builder: Bermuda
- Launched: 1813
- Fate: Wrecked 21 January 1821

General characteristics
- Tons burthen: 124, or 150 (bm)

Thomas Durham was launched in 1813 in Bermuda. She was wrecked in 1821.

Thomas Durham first appeared in Lloyd's Register (LR), in 1820.

Year	Master	Owner	Trade	Source
1820	J.Chissell	Captain & Co.	London–Cape of Good Hope	LR
1821	J.Chissell	Captain & Co.	London–Cape of Good Hope	LR

Fate: On 5 November 1820 Thomas Durham arrived at the Cape from Algoa Bay. On 14 January 1821 a storm tore Thomas Durham from her moorings in Mossel Bay, South Africa. She was wrecked with the loss of all on board. Captain J[ames] Chissell, having gone ashore, was the only survivor; it was expected that little of her cargo could be saved. She had come from "The Knysus".
