= HMS Griper (1813) =

19th-century British Royal Navy ship

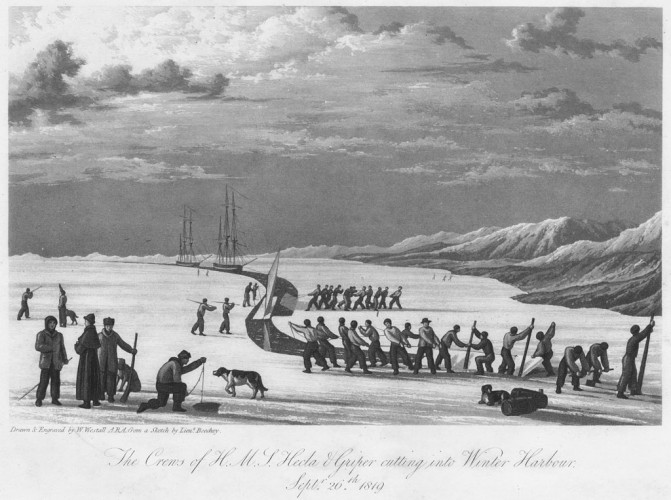
- The Crews of HMS Hecla & Griper Cutting into Winter Harbour, Sept. 26th, 1819, from the 1821 journal of the Arctic expedition

History

United Kingdom
- Name: HMS Griper
- Ordered: 2 November 1812
- Builder: Richards & Davidson, Hythe, Hampshire
- Launched: 14 July 1813
- Fate: Broken up November 1868

General characteristics
- Class & type: Bold-class gun-brig
- Tons burthen: 18160/94 bm
- Length: 84 ft 1 in (25.63 m) (overall); 70 ft 0 1/4 in (21.342 m) (keel)
- Beam: 22 ft 1 in (6.73 m)
- Depth of hold: 11 ft 0 1/4 in (3.359 m)
- Sail plan: Brig
- Complement: 60
- Armament: 10 × 18-pounder carronades + 2 × 6-pounder bow chasers

HMS Griper was a Bold-class gun-brig of the British Royal Navy, built in 1813 by Mark Williams and John Davidson at Hythe. (Note: The Bold class were a revival of Sir William Rule's Confounder-class gun-brig design of 1804.) She participated in the 1819 expedition to the Arctic led by William Parry, made a voyage to Greenland and Norway in 1823, and took part in Parry's third expedition in 1824 as a support ship. Her crew in 1819, 1823, or 1824, qualified for the "Arctic Medal", which the Admiralty issued in 1857. She was eventually broken up in 1868.

== Early career ==
Griper was commissioned in July 1813 under Commander Charles Mitchell. In February 1814 Commander Arthur M'Meekan replaced Mitchell. In 1817, Griper was at Chatham. She then underwent fitting as an exploration ship at Portsmouth between December 1818 and May 1819.

== Expedition to Northwest Passage (1819) ==
Lieutenant Matthew Liddon recommissioned Griper in January 1819. She then sailed with William Edward Parry from London on 11 May 1819. Parry commanded two 3-masted sailing ships: the 375 ton HMS Hecla and the 182 ton Griper. Their destination was the Northwest Passage.

Griper was by far the inferior of the two ships, being described as "one of these paltry Gunbrigs.....utterly unfit for this service!" (A.Parry; Parry of the Arctic ). Their departure had previously been delayed as Griper's condition was described as being "so crank as to cause apprehensions to be entertained for the safety of the officers and crew". She was so slow that she had to be towed by the Hecla part of the way across the Atlantic. However, they successfully traveled further West along the Northwest Passage than any European had previously achieved. After wintering at Melville Island they returned to London in November 1820, and Griper was paid off in December.

== Voyage to Greenland and Norway (1823) ==
Griper was refitted at Deptford between February and May 1823. Under the command of Captain Douglas Clavering, she conducted a voyage to Greenland and Spitzbergen, conveying astronomer Edward Sabine who took observations on behalf of the Board of Longitude. A further note to this voyage occurred on an island later named Clavering Island, where, in August, the expedition made the first and only European contact with the now extinct North Greenland Inuit.

== Northwest Passage expedition (1824) ==
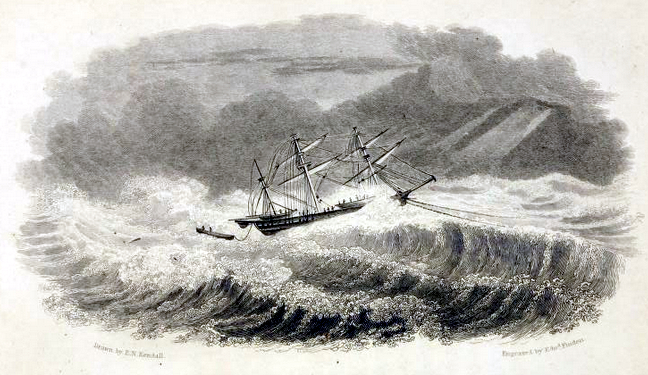
Situation of HMS Griper, Sept 1, 1824

Between January and June 1824, Griper was refitted for Parry's third Northwest Passage expedition. She was commissioned under George Francis Lyon and on 16 June 1824 she sailed for Hudson Bay, and Wager Bay in support of Hecla and Fury. Gripper departed on 3 July 1824, and proceeded in company with the survey vessel Snap. On this occasion, she was carrying a land component of men.

On 19 October 1824, Lyon encountered whaler Achilles, under the command of Captain Valentine. Valentine informed Lyon of the ice conditions and weather, which had resulted in a weak whaling season (Achilles had taken only two whales), and blocked much of Hudson's Strait. Achilles was homeward bound so Lyon sent duplicate dispatches with her.

Griper returned to London and was paid off in December 1824.

== Fate ==
Griper was fitted for the Coast Blockade service at Portsmouth between August and December 1825. She then joined the Coast Guard at Blackwall. She later also served at Sussex.

Griper was at Portsmouth between 1827 and 1830, and at Chichester between 1831 and 1860. She served as a target for gunnery experiments in Portsmouth in 1856, and was used to test armour plate in 1862. She was broken up in November 1868.
