= Oromocto (1813 ship) =

UK merchant ship 1813–1821

History

United Kingdom
- Name: Oromocto
- Namesake: Oromocto
- Builder: Oromocto, New Brunswick
- Launched: 1813
- Fate: Condemned 1821

General characteristics
- Tons burthen: 386, or 393 (bm)

Oromocto was launched at Oromocto, New Brunswick in 1813. She then traded between England and the Caribbean. She started trading between England and India but in 1820 she became leaky on her way back to England from India, put into Maranham, and was condemned there in 1821.

== Career ==
Oromocto sailed to England and was re-registered at Liverpool on 28 January 1814. She appeared in Lloyd's Register (LR) in 1815 with Campbell, master, Ritchie & Co., owners, and trade London–Yucatán.

On 18 and 19 October 1816 a hurricane hit Port-au-Prince. All the vessels in the harbour, except Orocamoto, were driven on shore or upset.

In 1813 the British East India Company (EIC) had lost its monopoly on the trade between India and Britain. British ships were then free to sail to India or the Indian Ocean under a license from the EIC.

On 18 October 1818, while Oromocto, Strickland, master, was in Table Bay, she broke free of her cables and ran afoul of Emma, carrying away her fore yard. On 23 October Oromocto sailed for Bombay.

In the first week of April 1819, Oromocto arrived at St Helena with a detachment of troops from the 22nd Regiment of Foot, who were replacing the 66th Regiment of Foot in their role of guarding Napoleon. On the 19th she sailed for England with a detachment of 400 men from the 66th.

Year	Master	Owner	Trade	Source & notes
1819	R.Strickland	T.Luccock	Liverpool–Bombay	LR; repairs 1817
1821	R.Strickland	Finlay	Liverpool–Bombay	LR; repairs 1818

== Fate ==
On 5 January 1820 Oromocto, Strickland, master, sailed for Bombay.

Oromocto sailed for England via Rio de Janeiro. On 26 December 1820 she stopped at Maranham, Brazil, leaking badly. She was expected to have to discharge her cargo. The next report was that her cargo had been almost entirely landed and appeared in good order, except for the lowest tier of sugars. However, the source of the leak had not yet been determined. She was condemned on 1 February, not being worth the cost of repairs. She was sold for breaking up on 9 February 1821.
