= Swallow (1813 ship) =

History

United Kingdom
- Builder: Blackmore & Co., Sulkea, Calcutta
- Launched: 17 February 1813
- Fate: Sold at Java

General characteristics
- Tons burthen: 330, or 333, or 35365/94 (bm)
- Length: 103 ft 2 in (31.4 m)
- Beam: 27 ft 9 in (8.5 m)
- Notes: Teak-built

Swallow was launched at Calcutta in 1813. She sailed to England and then traded between England and India under a license from the British East India Company (EIC) through 1824. She returned to Calcutta registry and at some point after 1824 was sold in Java.

== Career ==
In 1813 the EIC had lost its monopoly on the trade between India and Britain. British ships were then free to sail to India or the Indian Ocean under a license from the EIC.

Swallow first appeared in Lloyd's Register (LR) in 1815.

Year	Master	Owner	Trade	Source
1815	Brodie	Brodie & Co.	London-India	LR
1816	Brodie; Watson	Hook & Co.	London–India	LR
1820	Watson	Hook & Co.	London–India	LR; London–Madras
1824	Watson	Hook & Co.	London–India	LR; London–Madras

Swallow was no longer listed in LR after 1824.

== Fate ==
At some point Swallow was sold to new owners in Java.
