= Sappho (1813 ship) =

UK merchant ship 1813–1833

History

United Kingdom
- Name: Sappho
- Namesake: Sappho
- Builder: Holt & Richardson, Whitby
- Launched: 11 November 1813
- Fate: Last listed 1833

General characteristics
- Tons burthen: 360, or 36049/94, or 361 (bm)
- Length: 104 ft 1 in (31.7 m)
- Beam: 28 ft 9 in (8.8 m)

Sappho was launched in Whitby in 1813, and moved her registration to London in 1814. Thereafter she traded widely. She made a voyage to Bombay and one to Bengal, sailing under a licence from the British East India Company (EIC). She was last listed in 1833.

== Career ==
Sappho first appeared in the Register of Shipping (RS) in 1813. Missing pages in the online 1814 volume of Lloyd's Register (LR) mean that she first appeared in the 1815 online volume.

Year	Master	Owner	Trade	Source
1813	Granger	S.Holt	Whitby–London	RS
1815	W.Granger; W.Sleigh	Captain & Co.	London–Jamaica	LR
1816	W.Sligh; C.Hall	Captain & Co.	London–Jamaica	LR
1816	C.Hall	Herring	London–Bombay	LR

In 1813 the EIC had lost its monopoly on the trade between India and Britain. British ships were then free to sail to India or the Indian Ocean under a licence from the EIC.

On 30 March 1817 Sappho, C.Hall, master, sailed for Bombay, under a license from the EIC.

Year	Master	Owner	Trade	Source
1818	C.Hall	Herring	London–Bombay	LR
1819	C.Hall; Stewart	Herring	London–Bombay	LR

On 10 September 1819, Sappho, F.G.Stewart, sailed for Fort William, (Calcutta).

Year	Master	Owner	Trade	Source
1821	Stewart; Lamb	Herring	London–India; London–CGH	LR
1822	G.Lamb	Herring	London–CGH; London–Petersburg	LR
1824	G.Lamb; Gattenby	Herring	London–Petersburg; London–Lisbon	LR
1825	J.Gattenby	Herring	London–Quebec	LR
1826	J.Gattenby	Herring	London–Petersburg	LR
1830	J.Gattenby	Herring	London–Quebec	LR
1831	J.Gattenby	Richardson	London–Petersburg	LR

== Fate ==
Sappho was last listed in 1833.
