= USS Montgomery (1813) =

Early 19th century sloop or schooner

History

United States
- Name: USS Montgomery
- Namesake: Richard Montgomery
- Builder: Thomas MacDonough
- Launched: 1813
- Acquired: by purchase, 6 August 1813
- Fate: Sold, 1815

General characteristics
- Type: Sloop or schooner
- Armament: 9 × 9-pounder long guns; 2 × 18-pounder Columbiads

Service record
- Operations: War of 1812

USS Montgomery, a sloop or schooner, was built in 1813 by Thomas MacDonough and purchased on 6 August 1813 for duty on Lake Champlain, preventing plundering expeditions and convoying Wade Hampton's troops trying to penetrate into Canada. Montgomery continued service on the lake until deactivated and sold in 1815.

She was named for Brigadier General Richard Montgomery who fought and died in the American Revolutionary War.
