= Hippolyta (1813 ship) =

History

United Kingdom
- Name: Hippolyta
- Namesake: Hippolyta
- Owner: G. Schonswar & Co.
- Builder: William Gibson, Hull
- Launched: 2 February 1813
- Fate: Wrecked 4 March 1823

General characteristics
- Tons burthen: 352 (bm)
- Armament: 14 × 9-pounder carronades

Hippolyta (or Hippolita), was launched in 1813. She was initially a West Indiaman but then made some voyages to India under a license from the British East India Company. She returned to the West Indies trade and in 1823 wrecked near Boulogne, while sailing from Havana for London.

== Career ==
Hippolyta entered Lloyd's Register in 1813 with W.M. Hill, master, Schonswar, owner, and trade Hull–Jamaica. In January 1814 Hippolita, Hill, master, was on her way from Hull to Montego Bay, Jamaica, when she ran aground and lost her rudder near Montego Bay. HMS North Star towed her off.

In January 1814, Hippolyta was driven ashore on the coast of Jamaica. She was refloated with assistance from the Royal Navy sloop-of-war HMS North Star.

In 1813 the EIC lost its monopoly on the trade between India and Britain. British ships were then free to sail to India or the Indian Ocean under a license from the EIC.

Lloyd's Register for 1818 still showed Hippolyta with W. M. Hill, master, and Schonswar, owner. However, it showed her trade changing from Hull–Shields, to London–Calcutta. A list of licensed ships showed Hippolita, W.M.Hill, master, sailing for Bengal on 27 March 1818. A later list shows Hippolyta, J. Roberts, master, sailing for Bombay on 9 July 1821. It bears the annotation, "Lost". Her entry in Lloyd's Register for 1823 shows her master as J. Richards, her owner as Schonswar, and her trade as Hull–India. It also shows that she underwent a large repair in 1821.

== Loss ==
Hippolita, Doxhead, master was driven ashore by a tremendous gale and wrecked at Boulogne, Pas-de-Calais, France, on 4 March 1823. Boats from Boulogne rescued the crew, with the loss of a crew member. She was on a voyage from Havana, Cuba, to London. By the next day the vessel had gone to pieces.
