= Medusa (1813 ship) =

History

United Kingdom
- Name: Medusa
- Namesake: Medusa
- Owner: Thomas Hutchinson and Thomas Barrick
- Builder: Thomas Barrick, Whitby
- Launched: 1813
- Fate: Abandoned at sea 1 January 1834

General characteristics
- Tons burthen: 217 (bm)
- Armament: 6 guns

Medusa was launched at Whitby in 1813. She spent a number of years as a transport, but from the mid-1820s on she sailed between England and Canada. She was abandoned in a sinking state on 1 January 1834.

== Career ==
Medusa first appeared in Lloyd's Register (LR) in 1813 with Hutchinson, master, Barrick, owner, and trade London transport.

Year	Master	Owner	Trade	Source
1814	Hutchinson	Barrick	London transport	LR
1819	Hutchinson	Capt. & Co.	Plymouth transport	LR

In 1820 Medusa may have participated in the British government's 1820 Settlers scheme to bring settlers to South Africa. She arrived at Simon's Bay on 17 June 1820. However there is no record of any passengers arriving on her.

Year	Master	Owner	Trade	Source
1822	Hutchinson	Capt. & Co.	Cork transport	LR
1825	Hutchinson	Hutchinson	London–Prince Edward Island	LR
1828	J.Sampson	J.Sampson	Dublin–Quebec	LR
1833	J.Sampson	J.Sampson	Dublin–Quebec	LR

Lloyd's List reported on 23 September 1828 that Medusa, Sampson, master, had saved the crew of Evander at 44°N 48°W.

== Fate ==
Medusa was lost around 1833. She is no longer listed in Lloyd's Register in 1834. Lloyd's List reported on 7 January 1834 that a Medusa had been abandoned at sea 60 miles off Flamborough Head. On 1 January 1834 Clyde rescued all ten people on board Medusa, of Whitby as she was in a sinking state. The survivors were Captain Wilson, his wife, and eight crew men. Clyde brought them into Grimsby on 4 January.
