= Partridge (1814 ship) =

History

United Kingdom
- Name: Partridge
- Namesake: Partridge
- Launched: 1813, Antwerp
- Fate: Broken up 1834

General characteristics
- Tons burthen: 51639/94, or 517 (bm)
- Length: 124 ft 6 in (37.9 m)
- Beam: 30 ft 3 in (9.2 m)

Partridge was built at Antwerp in 1813, under another name, and was taken in prize. From 1814 she was under British ownership. Between 1814 and 1822 she traded with India, sailing under a license from the British East India Company (EIC). She then became a whaler, making three voyages to the British southern whale fishery before she was broken up in 1834.

== Career ==
The prize court on 29 July 1814 condemned the vessel that would become Partridge. She appeared in Lloyd's Register in 1815 with Anderson, master, Donaldson, owner, and trade London–Île de France.

In 1813 the EIC had lost its monopoly on the trade between India and Britain. British ships were then free to sail to India or the Indian Ocean under a license from the EIC. Her owners twice applied for a licence, once on 13 March 1814 that they received on 16 March, and again on 31 January 1816 that received it the next day.

Year	Master	Owner	Trade	Source
1820	G.Betham	Blanchard	Liverpool–India	LR

On 13 April 1820 Partridge, Betham, master, sailed for Madras under a licence from the EIC.

On 31 December 1820, Partridge, Betham, master, struck on the Pulicat Shoal near Madras while on a journey from London to Bengal. She was refloated and sailed for Bombay. On 15 January she passed Point de Galle on her way to Bombay. She came into Bombay and there was a report that Partridge, Belham, master, had come in so leaky that she was run ashore and was wrecked. Partridge was docked and a letter dated 13 March stated that she had been put up for sale on 10 March in a dismantled state, with all her stores, and sold for 20,500 Rupees. Her block has been resold at an advance of 5000 Rs. She was undergoing caulking and repairs to her copper sheathing. It was expected that she would be ready on 19 or 20 March. Then Lloyd's List reported that Partridge, Betham, master, which had been condemned and sold at Bombay in March, had been repaired. She was expected to sail to China on 12 April.

On 18 April 1822 Partridge, Bradshaw, master, was at the Cape of Good Hope, having come from Bombay. On the 28th a strong gale caused her to part from her anchors to be blown out to sea. She returned safely to the Cape on 1 May. She arrived at Gravesend on 18 July. On her return to England from Asia Partridge's new owner, Mellish, deployed her as a whaler.

1st whaling voyage (1823–1826): Captain Thornton sailed on 1 May 1823 for Peru. A letter dated 12 December 1823 at Callao reported that Partridge, Thronton, master, had returned to whaling and that since taken a whale that had yielded eight tons of oil, not including the head, and that she had gathered some 46 tons in all. She returned to England on 14 July 1826 with 600 casks of oil. She had sailed from Otahette (Tahiti) on 27 December 1825 and from Valparaiso in March 1826.

2nd whaling voyage (1826–1830): Captain Noah Pease Folger sailed from London on 23 October 1826, bound for the Pacific. At the end of February 1828 Partridge was at Lukunor. Partridge returned to England on 9 July 1830 with 560 casks of oil. This voyage was a financial failure.

After Partridge's owner, James Mellish, had blamed the failure on Folger's abilities, on 18 February 1833, Folger shot at Mellish in the Shipping Exchange in London. Mellish, after arbitration, had paid £848 against Folger's claim for £1200. Mellish did not reemploy Folger, and Folger could not get a reference; Folger had become increasingly disturbed before the shooting, though he had already manifested aberrant behaviour on the voyage. Folger was incarcerated at the Hanwell lunatic asylum for about three years; he disappeared after his release. Mellish died in 1837.

3rd whaling voyage (1830–1834): Partridge underwent a large repair in 1830. Captain Stavers then sailed for Peru. In 1831 Partridge was reported to have visited the Bonin Islands. She returned to England on 22 January 1834. She was reported to have visited Honolulu and Valparaiso during her voyage.

== Fate ==
On 5 November 1834 her register was cancelled as she had been broken up.
