= Susan (1813 ship) =

British East Indiaman and convict transport (1813–1846)

History

United Kingdom
- Name: Susan
- Owner: 1815:J.C. Collingwood; 1819:Alexander & Co.; 1822:Thomas Ward
- Builder: Matthew Smith, Calcutta
- Launched: 23 October 1813
- Fate: Foundered 1846

General characteristics
- Tons burthen: 523, or 56758/94 or 568, or 572, or 573 (bm)
- Length: 121 ft 3 in (37.0 m)
- Beam: 32 ft 7 in (9.9 m)
- Armament: 1815:2 guns; 1828:8 guns

Susan was launched at Calcutta in 1813. She initially traded in the East Indies as a country ship, and with Britain under license from the British East India Company (EIC). Between 1829 and 1831 she made two voyages for the EIC. Then between 1834 and 1836 she made four voyages transporting convicts, two to New South Wales, and two to Tasmania. She foundered in 1846 as she was sailing between London and the Cape of Good Hope.

== Career ==
The EIC lost its monopoly on trade with India in 1813. Thereafter, British non-EIC vessels could legally trade with India under a license from the EIC.

Susan appears in Lloyd's Register in 1815 with Collingwood, master and owner, and trade London–Bengal. She then traded to India under licenses from the EIC.

Susan and Countess of Loudon were sailing from Bengal to China when Countess struck a shoal during the night in early November 1816. She went over the shoal but was bilged. The water rose to her ports and the crew had to abandon her. Susan was able to save Countess's crew. Countess was carrying a cargo of cotton.

Susan underwent a large repair in 1827. In 1828 her master was Holliday and her trade London–Calcutta.

Pirate incident (1828): In February 1828 or so Susan was returning from Bengal when she stopped at St Helena. Because of the report of pirates, she left in a convoy of eight vessels, of which she was the chief ship. Unfortunately, one of the vessels was Morning Star, a noticeably slow sailer, which was returning from Ceylon. The other six vessels soon out-sailed Susan, which held back to accompany Morning Star. Eventually Susan too left Morning Star at some point before 21 February.

As Susan was sailing she encountered the pirate ship Black Joke, which was under the command of Benito de Soto. Black Joke was armed with one long gun amidships. At her approach, Susan ran out her four starboard guns. Black Joke pursued for two hours, and then sailed away. This was fortunate as although Susan had loaded shot, by some oversight she had not loaded powder.

On 19 February 1828 Black Joke captured Morning Star near Ascension Island. de Soto killed Captain Souley and several others. The boarding party also assaulted the women passengers and plundered Morning Star. Due to indiscipline on the part of the pirate boarding party, they did not kill all aboard nor scuttle their capture and she eventually reached England. The pirates were eventually captured and executed at Gibraltar on 11 January 1830.

EIC voyage #1 (1828-1829): Captain George Holiday sailed from Falmouth on 20 July 1828, bound for Bengal. Susan arrived at Calcutta on 15 January 1829 and left on 12 February. She returned to her moorings on 31 August.

EIC voyage #2 (1830-1831): Captain Holiday sailed from Portsmouth on 2 June 1830, bound for the Cape of Good Hope, Madras, and Bengal. She reached the Cape on 19 August and Madras on 7 October. She arrived at Calcutta on 4 November. Homeward bound, she was at Saugor on 30 January 1831 and the Cape on 25 March. She reached St Helean on 11 April and arrived at The Downs on 10 June.

The Register of Shipping for 1832 shows Susan's master changing from Holliday to Gillis, and her trade from London–Madras to London–Calcutta.

Convict voyage #1 (1834): Captain Stephen Addison sailed from London on 10 March 1834. Susan sailed via Madeira and arrived at Sydney on 8 July. She had embarked 300 male convicts and she landed 292, having suffered eight convict deaths en route.

Convict voyage #2 (1835-1836): Captain Henry Neatby sailed from Portsmouth on 10 October 1835. She arrived at Sydney on 7 February 1836. She had She had embarked 300 male convicts and she landed 294, having suffered six convict deaths en route.

Convict voyage #3 (1837): Captain Neatby sailed from London on 5 August 1837. Susan arrived at Hobart Town on 21 November. She had embarked 300 male convicts and she landed 293, having suffered six convict deaths en route. One convict may have been landed before she departed England.

Convict voyage #4 (1842): Captain Neatby sailed from Plymouth on 24 April 1842. Susan arrived at Hobart Town on 25 July. The voyage took 91 days and was the second fastest from England to Tasmania. She embarked 299 convicts and landed 297, having suffered two convict deaths en route.

== Fate ==
Susan underwent a large repair in 1844. She apparently then foundered on her way from London to the Cape. The entry for her in Lloyd's Register for 1846 is marked "Lost".
