= Lady Flora (1813 ship) =

UK merchant ship (1813–1855)

History

United Kingdom
- Name: Lady Flora
- Namesake: Flora Mure-Campbell, Marchioness of Hastings
- Builder: Anthony Blackmore, Calcutta
- Launched: 24 November 1813
- Fate: Last listed in 1855
- Notes: Teak-built

General characteristics
- Tons burthen: 705, or 706, or 750, or 751, or 756, or 7567/94 (bm)
- Length: 132 ft 8 in (40.4 m)
- Beam: 35 ft 9 in (10.9 m)
- Propulsion: Sail
- Notes: Teak-built

Lady Flora was launched at Calcutta in 1813. She spent her entire career as an East Indiaman but made only one voyage for the British East India Company (EIC). She was last listed in 1855.

== Career ==
On 25 November 1814 Lloyd's List reported that Lady Flora, Knox, master, had to put into Portsmouth after some coals had got into the well and clogged the pumps. She was on her way from London to Bengal and had to unload part of the cargo to be able to deal with the problem.

Lady Flora entered the Register of Shipping in 1815 with W. Knox, master, changing to Brown, Stewart, owner, changing to Paxton, and trade London–India.

EIC voyage 1815–1816): Captain Thomas Brown sailed from Macao on 19 December 1815, bound for Britain. Lady Flora reached the Cape of Good Hope on 20 February 1816 and St Helena on 17 March. She arrived at the Downs.

On 23 March 1821 Lady Flora was at the Cape of Good Hope when a gale came up. Lady Boringdon parted from her three anchors and ran into Lady Flora, but caused little damage. Lady Flora gave Lady Borringdon an anchor.

| Year | Master | Owner | Trade | Source & notes |
|---|---|---|---|---|
| 1825 | Brown | J.Palmer | London–India | LR |
| 1830 | Harper | Frayrer | London–Calcutta | LR |
| 1835 | R. Ford | | | LR |
| 1840 | R. Ford | Ford | London–Madras | LR |
| 1845 | R. Ford | Ford | London–Madras | LR |
| 1850 | T. Eagles | Kenrick | London–Madras | LR |
| 1851 | Pentreath | Kenrick | London–Mediterranean; London–Adelaide | LR |

On 12 July 1851, Lady Flora sailed from London for South Australia. She arrived at Adelaide on 31 October 1851, possibly with migrants.

| Year | Master | Owner | Trade | Source & notes |
|---|---|---|---|---|
| 1855 | Parker | Hodginson | | LR |
