= USS Buffalo (1813) =

Tender of the United States Navy

History

United States
- Name: USS Buffalo
- Acquired: Built, 1813
- In service: 29 May 1813
- Out of service: 12 August 1816
- Fate: Sold, 12 August 1816

General characteristics
- Type: Sloop
- Propulsion: Sail
- Complement: 44
- Armament: 5 guns

USS Buffalo was a block sloop in the United States Navy during the War of 1812. Buffalo was built in Philadelphia, Pennsylvania, under the supervision of naval constructor Charles Penrose. Buffalo conducted her sea trials on 29 May 1813 and was commissioned soon thereafter, with Lt. Samuel Angus in command.

== Name ==
Buffalo was named for the American bison, commonly referred to as buffalo, not the city of Buffalo on Lake Erie in western New York as later ships of her name were.

== History ==
Constructed for service with the Delaware Flotilla, a unit that Lt. Angus also commanded, Buffalo, which resembled a vessel loaded with shingles, saw her only action just weeks after commissioning. The morning of 29 July 1813 found the Delaware Flotilla lying off Dennis Creek, when Lt. Angus discovered that the British 18-gun sloop-of-war HMS Martin aground on the outer ridge of Crow's Shoals after chasing and capturing a small vessel too near the Overfalls.

Angus, thinking it "proper to endeavor to bring him [Martin] to action," ordered the flotilla, consisting of the block sloops USS Buffalo and USS Camel and eight gunboats, to weigh anchor and stand toward the enemy. As the American ships did so, however, the British 38-gun frigate HMS Junon anchored to support Martin.

The Americans, despite being plagued by poor gunpowder, delivered a brisk cannonade of the grounded sloop but did so from too great a distance. Likewise, while most of the enemy's shot missed Angus' ships, one passed through the foot of Buffalo's jib and another through the under part of her bowsprit. Only one other American ship, Gunboat No. 125, suffered any damage in the inconclusive, long-range engagement, although Gunboat No. 121 was captured after straying from the formation in disobedience to Angus' orders.

The court of inquiry that met on board Buffalo on 11 September 1813 found Angus guilty of an error in judgement but not of any lack of personal bravery. He had shown ample courage at other times in his career, both in the Quasi-War with France and in the War of 1812. The court felt that he might have moved his command closer to the grounded Martin which then might have been at the flotilla's mercy, given her condition.

Buffalo presumably spent the remainder of her career based at Philadelphia serving as a transport with the Delaware Flotilla. On 24 July 1816, the president of the Board of Navy Commissioners directed George Harrison, the Navy agent in Philadelphia, to sell Buffalo and three other ships. On 12 August 1816, she was sold to Bowers and Company for $1,100.

== See also ==
- HMS Buffalo, a Royal Navy storeship commissioned in the same year
- List of sailing frigates of the United States Navy
- Naval tactics in the Age of Sail
