= Mary Ross (shipbuilder) =

English shipbuilder

Mary Ross (18th-century – 1847) was an English shipbuilder. She is known as the successful shipbuilder of the British Navy during the Napoleonic Wars. She was married to Charles Ross (d. 1808) of Rochester and took over his company after his death.

Mary Ross was married to the shipbuilder Charles Ross (d. 1808) of Rochester, and took over his business company after his death. The shipyard of her late husband in Rochester constructed ships for the Hudson Bay company and the British East Indian company. During her tenure, she became one of the largest shipbuilders for the British fleet during the Napoleonic wars, and was commissioned by the state. She was a successful businesswoman and earned a fortune. When the shipbuilding business experienced a decline after the end of the Napoleonic wars in 1815, she sold the company, and retired with a fortune, which she eventually divided among her children.
