= List of ship launches in 1818 =

The list of ship launches in 1818 includes a chronological list of some ships launched in 1818.

Date	Ship	Class	Builder	Location	Country	Notes
8 January	Centaure	Bucentaure-class ship of the line	Jean Michel Segondat	Cherbourg	United Kingdom	For French Navy.
9 January	Isabella	Full-rigged ship	John Warwick	Rotherhithe	United Kingdom	For private owner.
January	Agenoria	Brig	J. Morrice	Sunderland	United Kingdom	For J. Barker.
24 February	William Etherington	Full-rigged ship	Messrs. Smith	Gainsborough	United Kingdom	For private owner.
February	Barbara	Brig		Aberdeen	United Kingdom	For private owner.
February	Castle Forbes	Full-rigged ship		Aberdeen	United Kingdom	For private owner.
February	Mary Ann	Schooner		Liverpool	United Kingdom	For private owner.
February	Norval	Brig		Aberdeen	United Kingdom	For private owner.
February	Resolution	Brig		Aberdeen	United Kingdom	For private owner.
2 March	Sesostris	Merchantman	James Shepherd	Paull	United Kingdom	For Mr. Staniforth.
21 March	Neptune	Bucentaure-class ship of the line	Aimé Jean Louis Nicholas René Le Dean	Lorient	France	For French Navy.
23 March	Lucy Davidson	Indiaman	John & Mark Richards	Southampton	United Kingdom	For private owner.
24 March	George Canning	Merchantman	Mottershead & Heyes	Liverpool	United Kingdom	For private owner.
6 April	Iris	Iris-class schooner		Rochefort	France	For French Navy.
8 April	Rockingham	East Indiaman	Philip Laing	Sunderland	United Kingdom	For John Laing.
27 April	Sisters	Brig	Steemson	Hull	United Kingdom	For John Marshall.
27 April	Stedcombe	Schooner		Lyme Regis	United Kingdom	For private owner.
1 May	Oktrytie	Kamchatka-class frigate	B. F. Stoke	Saint Petersburg	Russia	For Imperial Russian Navy.
2 May	Olive Branch	Snow	Thomas White	Cowes	United Kingdom	For Brown Mount.
7 May	Flora	Fourth rate	A. I. Melikhov	Nicholaieff	Russia	For Imperial Russian Navy.
8 May	Skoryi	Anapa-class ship of the line	M. K. Surovtsov	Kherson	Russia	For Imperial Russian Navy.
14 May	Vulcan	Steamboat	Messrs. Wilson & Smillie	Falkirk	United Kingdom	For Forth & Clyde Canal Co.
20 May	Retvizan	Selafail-class ship of the line	A. M. Kurochkin	Arkhangelsk	Russia	For Imperial Russian Navy.
28 May	Walk-in-the-Water	Paddle steamer	Noah Brown	Black Rock, New York	United States	For Lake Erie Steamboat Company.
May	Fanny	Brig		Monkwearmouth	United Kingdom	For private owner.
3 June	Racer	Nightingale-class cutter		Pembroke Dockyard	United Kingdom	For Royal Navy.
3 June	Sprightly	Nightingale-class cutter		Pembroke Dockyard	United Kingdom	For Royal Navy.
10 June	Diana	Amfitrada-class frigate	A. M. Kurochkin	Arkhangelsk	Russia	For Imperial Russian Navy.
18 June	Duc de Berry	Téméraire-class ship of the line	Aimé Jean Louis Nicholas René Le Dean	Rochefort	France	For French Navy.
18 June	Ladoga	Transport ship	Y. A. Kolodkin	Lodeynoye Pole	Russia	For Imperial Russian Navy.
24 June	Unnamed	Steamship		Naples	Kingdom of the Two Sicilies	For private owner.
June	Ann	Merchantman	J. Watson & P. Mills	Sunderland	United Kingdom	For R. Denton.
June	Antelope	Sailboat			United Kingdom	For private owner.
June	Barretto Junior	Merchantman	Michael Smith	Howrah	India	For R. Ford & Co.
1 July	Raduga	Schooner	B. F. Stoke	Saint Petersburg	Russia	For Imperial Russian Navy.
4 July	Guard	Schooner	Gibson	Hull	United Kingdom	For Gee, Loft & Co.
4 July	Vostok	Sloop-of-war	B. F. Stoke	Saint Petersburg	Russia	For Imperial Russian Navy.
15 July	Diana	Frigate		Copenhagen	Denmark	For Royal Danish Navy.
27 July	Gonets	Feniks-class sloop	A. I. Melikhov	Saint Petersburg	Russia	For Imperial Russian Navy.
July	Curacio	Corvette	Forman Cheeseman	Corlear's Hook, New York	United States	For Paul Delano.
July	Hippomene	Merchantman		Nantes	France	For private owner.
3 August	Svir	Mirnyi-class transport ship	Y. A. Kolodkin	Lodeynoye Pole	Russia	For Imperil Russian Navy.
5 August	Dauntless	Merchantman	Steemson	Hull	United Kingdom	For Messrs. Eggington & Beadle.
17 August	Pegas	Vestnik-class cutter	B. F. Stoke	Saint Petersburg	Russia	For Imperial Russian Navy.
August	Emulous	Brig	J. Bell	Sunderland	United Kingdom	For B. Roberts & Co.
August	Constance	Frigate		Brest	France	For French Navy.
August	Savannah	Paddle steamer	Fickett & Crockett	New York	United States	For Savannah Steamship Company.
3 September	Malay	Merchantman	John Scott & Sons	Greenock	United Kingdom	For Roger Sinclair.
16 September	Bussorah Merchant	Merchantman	J. Thomas	Howrah	India	For W. Bruce & Co.
18 September	Asiya	Fifth rate			(Ottoman Empire) Egypt	For Egyptian Navy.
September	Nimrod	Smack	Richard Bussell	Lyme Regis	United Kingdom	For Thompson, Lumsden & Catto.
1 October	Thames	East Indiaman	John Blackett	Poplar	United Kingdom	For John Blackett.
2 October	Albion	East Indiaman	Robert Steele	Greenock	United Kingdom	For private owner.
2 October	Christian	Merchantman	John Scott & Sons	Greenock	United Kingdom	For private owner.
3 October	Fame	Merchantman	H. J. W. Pitcher	Northfleet	United Kingdom	For private owner.
15 October	Talavera	Repulse-class ship of the line	Henry Canham	Woolwich Dockyard	United Kingdom	For Royal Navy.
16 October	Waterloo	Third rate	Nicholas Diddams	Portsmouth Dockyard	United Kingdom	For Royal Navy.
29 October	Providence Good Intent	Merchantman	Rolletts	Grimsby	United Kingdom	For private owner.
31 October	Annan	Sloop		Annan Well	United Kingdom	For private owner.
5 November	Katherine Stewart Forbes	Full-rigged ship	Henry & William Pitcher	Northfleet	United Kingdom	For A. Chapman & Co.
November	Enterprise	Steamship	Connecticut Steam Boat Company	Hartford, Connecticut	United States	For private owner.
12 December	Bustard	Cherokee-class brig-sloop		Chatham Dockyard	United Kingdom	For Royal Navy.
16 December	Abberton	West Indiaman	Jabez Bayley	Ipswich	United Kingdom	For British East India Company.
28 December	Malabar	Repulse-class ship of the line		Bombay Dockyard	India	For Royal Navy.
29 December	Alacrity	Cherokee-class brig-sloop		deptford Dockyard	United Kingdom	For Royal Navy.
December	Henry and William	Brig		Southwick	United Kingdom	For private owner.
Unknown date	Acasta	Brig	T. R. Greenwell	Sunderland	United Kingdom	For T. R. Greenwell.
Unknown date	Alejandro I	Third rate			Spain	For Royal Spanish Navy.
Unknown date	Alfred	Merchantman	James Macrae	Chittagong	India	For private owner.
Unknown date	Anglesea	Yacht		Southampton	United Kingdom	For Charles Paget.
Unknown date	Asia	Merchantman	Cochar & Hall.	Aberdeen	United Kingdom	For George McInnes.
Unknown date	Bencoolen	East Indiaman		Liverpool	United Kingdom	For Jones & Co.
Unknown date	Brothers	Snow	John M. & William Gales	Sunderland	United Kingdom	For John M. & William Gales.
Unknown date	Cadmus	Merchantman		New York	United States	For Whitlock Line.
Unknown date	Castle Forbes	Merchantman	Robert Gibbon & Sons	Aberdeen	United Kingdom	For Robert Gibbon & Sons.
Unknown date	Dart	Brig		Sunderland	United Kingdom	For private owner.
Unknown date	Diana	Merchantman	John Peter Fearon	Cochin	India	For private owner.
Unknown date	Dolfijn	Sixth rate		Dunkirk	France	For Royal Netherlands Navy.
Unknown date	Earl Strathmore	Brig	Oswald Partis	Sunderland	United Kingdom	For John White.
Unknown date	Enchantress	Merchantman		Plymouth	United Kingdom	For B. Roberts.
Unknown date	Exmouth	Brig		North Shields	United Kingdom	For Wright & Co.
Unknown date	Felicitas	Merchantman	James Macrae	Chittagong	India	For private owner.
Unknown date	Friends	Snow		Monkwearmouth	United Kingdom	For J. Clyne & Co.
Unknown date	Galathe	Sixth rate		Dunkirk	France	For Royal Netherlands Navy.
Unknown date	Gier	Full-rigged ship		Rotterdam	Netherlands	For Royal Netherlands Navy.
Unknown date	John	Snow		Sunderland	United Kingdom	For private owner.
Unknown date	Koerier	Full-rigged ship		Vlissingen	Netherlands	For Royal Netherlands Navy.
Unknown date	Komeet	Sixth rate		Rotterdam	Netherlands	For Royal Netherlands Navy.
Unknown date	Levant	Merchantman	John M. & William Gales	Sunderland	United Kingdom	For John M. & William Gales.
Unknown date	London Engineer	Paddle steamer	D. Brent	Rotherhithe	United Kingdom	For T. Bramah, W. Bovill, A. Galloway and others.
Unknown date	Lovely Ann	Brig	John M. & William Gales	Sunderland	United Kingdom	For Samuel Bryan.
Unknown date	Luna	Brig	John M & William Gales	Sunderland	United Kingdom	For Robert Knox.
Unknown date	Lynx	Sixth rate		Dunkirk	France	For Royal Netherlands Navy.
Unknown date	Mediterranean	Brig	John M. & William Gales	Sunderland	United Kingdom	For John M. & William Gales.
Unknown date	Milo	Merchantman	Reay	Sunderland	United Kingdom	For private owner.
Unknown date	New Albion	Brig	John M. & William Gales	Sunderland	United Kingdom	For John Bishop.
Unknown date	Orpheus	Merchantman		Southampton	United Kingdom	For John St Barbe & Co.
Unknown date	Placidia	Snow		Sunderland	United Kingdom	For Mr. Oswald.
Unknown date	Rob Roy	Paddle steamer	William Denny	Dumbarton	United Kingdom	For David Napier.
Unknown date	Rosetta	Snow		Sunderland	United Kingdom	For Ridley & Co.
Unknown date	Royalist	Merchantman	W. & J. Pile	Sunderland	United Kingdom	For Mr. Robson.
Unknown date	Skelton	Merchantman	Holt & Richardson	Whitby	United Kingdom	For Dixon & Co.
Unknown date	Thames	Brig	John M. & William Gales	Sunderland	United Kingdom	For John White.
Unknown date	Union	Yacht		Southampton	United Kingdom	For Arthur Paget.
Unknown date	Velasco	Third rate			Spain	For Royal Spanish Navy.
Unknown date	Victory	Paddle steamer	Elias Evans	Frindsbury	United Kingdom	For Elias Evans.
Unknown date	William and Ann	Snow		Bermuda	(United Kingdom of Great Britain and Ireland) Bermuda	For private owner.
Unknown date	William Shand	Merchantman		Sunderland	United Kingdom	For Lumsden & Co.
Unknown date	Zebra	Full-rigged ship			Unknown	For private owner.
Unknown date	Zoroaster	Merchantman		Hull	United Kingdom	For Eggington & Co.
