= List of shipwrecks in November 1831 =

List of shipwrecks in November 1831 includes sunk, foundered, grounded, or otherwise lost during November 1831.

== 1 November ==
List of shipwrecks: 1 November 1831
Ship	State	Description
Acadia	United Kingdom	The ship was driven ashore and wrecked at Greenisland, County Antrim. She was on a voyage from Dublin to Quebec City, Lower Canada, British North America.
Ann	United Kingdom	The ship was wrecked in the Bay of Bulls. Her crew were rescued.
Waterloo	United Kingdom	The ship was driven ashore and wrecked on the Dutch coast. She was on a voyage from Leith, Lothian to Rotterdam, South Holland, Netherlands.

== 2 November ==
List of shipwrecks: 2 November 1831
Ship	State	Description
Catharine	United Kingdom	The ship was wrecked near Talmine, Sutherland with the loss of all three of her crew. She was on a voyage from Tongue, Sutherland to Wick, Caithness.

== 3 November ==
List of shipwrecks: 3 November 1831
Ship	State	Description
Ant	United Kingdom	The ship capsized and sank in the Irish Sea off Larne, County Antrim with the loss of all hands. She was on a voyage from Londonderry to Liverpool, Lancashire.
Harmony	United Kingdom	The whaler was wrecked on the Trinity Sand, in the Humber.
Julia	United Kingdom	The ship was run down and sunk in The Solent 5 nautical miles (9.3 km) east of Cowes, Isle of Wight by the steamship Lord of the Isles (United Kingdom). Her crew were rescued by Lord of the Isles.

== 4 November ==
List of shipwrecks: 4 November 1831
Ship	State	Description
Dorothea	Norway	The ship was driven ashore and wrecked at Noordwijk, South Holland, Netherlands. She was on a voyage from Christiansand to Bordeaux, Gironde, France.
Eliza	United Kingdom	The ship departed from Marstrand, Sweden for London. No further trace, presumed foundered with the loss of all hands.
Jane	United Kingdom	The ship foundered in the Irish Sea off Peel, Isle of Man. Her crew were rescued. She was on a voyage from Belfast, County Antrim to Liverpool, Lancashire.
Mary	United Kingdom	The ship was in collision with another vessel in the Irish Sea and was abandoned by her crew. She was on a voyage from Glasgow, Renfrewshire to Lisbon, Portugal.
Sisters	United Kingdom	The ship was in collision with another vessel in the Baltic Sea between Hogland, Russia and the Aspö Islands, Grand Duchy of Finland. She capsized and sank. Her crew were rescued. Sisters was on a voyage from Saint Petersburg, Russia to London.

== 5 November ==
List of shipwrecks: 5 November 1831
Ship	State	Description
Allonby	United Kingdom	The ship was driven ashore and sank at Burnfoot, Dumfriesshire. Her crew were rescued. She was on a voyage from Maryport, Cumberland to Dumfries.
Ariel	United Kingdom	The schooner-brig was wrecked near Brindisi, Kingdom of the Two Sicilies. HMS Actaeon (Royal Navy) rescued the crew. Ariel was on a voyage from Trieste to Greenock, Renfrewshire.
Betty and Peggy	United Kingdom	The ship was driven ashore at "Rhydland" with the loss of a crew member. She was on a voyage from Bangor, Caernarfonshire to Liverpool, Lancashire.
Ceres	United Kingdom	The ship was holed by an anchor and sank at Beaumaris, Anglesey.
Radiant	United Kingdom	The ship sailed from Montreal, Lower Canada, British North America for London. No further trace, presumed foundered with the loss of all hands.

== 6 November ==
List of shipwrecks: 6 November 1831
Ship	State	Description
James	United Kingdom	The ship was driven ashore at Egmond aan Zee, North Holland, Netherlands. Her crew were rescued. She was on a voyage from Inverkeithing, Fife to Schiedam, South Holland, Netherlands.
Nancy Dawson	United Kingdom	The coaster was wrecked on the West Hoyle Sandbank, in Liverpool Bay.

== 7 November ==
List of shipwrecks: 7 November 1831
Ship	State	Description
Anna	Sweden	The ship foundered in the North Sea off Lindesnes, Lister og Mandal, Norway. She was on a voyage from Marseille, Bouches-du-Rhône, France to Gothenburg.
Betsey	United Kingdom	The ship was driven ashore and wrecked near Fraserburgh, Aberdeenshire. Her crew were rescued.
Diana	Bremen	The ship ran aground on the Goodwin Sands, Kent. She refloated but consequently foundered in the North Sea off the Galloper Sand. Her crew were rescued. Diana was on a voyage from Bremen to Cuba.
Iona	France	The ship foundered in the North Sea off Lindesnes. She was on a voyage from Marseille to Gothenburg.
Premier	United Kingdom	The ship was wrecked at the mouth of the Volta River, Gold Coast. Her crew were rescued.
Snowden	United Kingdom	The ship was lost in early November.
Torra Vechia	flag unknown	The ship foundered in the North Sea off Lindesnes.

== 8 November ==
List of shipwrecks: 8 November 1831
Ship	State	Description
Agenoria	United Kingdom	The ship was driven ashore on the north west coast of North Ronaldsay, Orkney Islands. Her crew were rescued. She was on a voyage from Arkhangelsk, Russia to Aberdeen.
Ann and Jane	United Kingdom	The collier, a brig, sprang a leak and foundered. Her crew were rescued.
Cossack	United Kingdom	The ship was driven ashore at "Norbeck". She was on a voyage from Liverpool, Lancashire to Sierra Leone.
Forley	United Kingdom	The ship was abandoned at sea. She was on a voyage from Sunderland, County Durham to Plymouth, Devon.
Gouvernor Jan Imhoff	Hamburg	The ship was driven ashore and wrecked on Pembrey Sands, Glamorgan with the loss of a crew member. She was on a voyage from Livorno, Grand Duchy of Tuscany to Hamburg via Swansea, Glamorgan.
Hopewell	United Kingdom	The ship was driven ashore at Point of Ayre, Isle of Man and was abandoned by her crew. She later floated off and was boarded by the crew of the Ramsey Lifeboat, who intended to take her in to port.
Latona	United Kingdom	The ship was wrecked in Bighouse Bay. She was on a voyage from Hammerfest, Norway to Swansea, Glamorgan.
Vriendschap	Heligoland	The ship was driven ashore and wrecked on Düne.
Zephyr	United Kingdom	The ship was wrecked at Kyleakin, Skye. Her crew were rescued. She was on a voyage from Newcastle upon Tyne, Northumberland to Newry, County Armagh.

== 9 November ==
List of shipwrecks: 9 November 1831
Ship	State	Description
Camperdown	United Kingdom	The ship was wrecked on the New Ground, 14 Wersts (approximately 8 nautical miles (15 km)) north east of Osmussaar, Russia. She was on a voyage from Saint Petersburg, Russia to London.
Frieundschaft	Hamburg	The ship was driven ashore and wrecked at Thisted, Denmark. She was on a voyage from Sunderland, County Durham, United Kingdom to Hamburg.

== 10 November ==
List of shipwrecks: 10 November 1831
Ship	State	Description
Anacreon	United Kingdom	The ship sprang a leak and was abandoned in the Atlantic Ocean. Her crew were rescued by Resolution (United Kingdom). She was on a voyage from Quebec City, Lower Canada, British North America to London.
Belus	United Kingdom	The ship sank on the Cross Sand, in the North Sea off Great Yarmouth, Norfolk. she was on a voyage from South Shields, County Durham to Dartmouth, Devon.
Cinque Frères	France	The ship was wrecked on the Goodwin Sands, Kent, United Kingdom. Her crew were rescued. She was on a voyage from newcastle upon Tyne, Northumberland, United Kingdom to Nantes, Loire-Inférieure.
George	United Kingdom	The ship was lost near the Water of Urr.
Lady Montgomerie	United Kingdom	The brig foundered in the Irish Sea 2 to 3 nautical miles (3.7 to 5.6 km) off Saltcoats, Ayrshire with the loss of three of her five crew. The survivors were rescued by the Ardrossan Lifeboat. She was on a voyage from Irvine, Ayrshire to Dublin.
Gleaner	United Kingdom	The ship was driven ashore on Lindisfarne. She was on a voyage from Perth to London.
Nelson	United Kingdom	The ship was driven ashore and severely damaged at Workington, Cumberland. She was on a voyage from Belfast, County Antrim to Workington.
Resolution	United Kingdom	The ship was driven ashore in Loch Indaal. She was on a voyage from Dublin to Portrush, County Antrim
William	United Kingdom	The ship was driven ashore in Loch Indaal. She was on a voyage from Wick, Caithness to Limerick.

== 11 November ==
List of shipwrecks: 11 November 1831
Ship	State	Description
Anna Helena	Bremen	The ship departed from Gravesend, Kent, United Kingdom for Bremen. No further trace, presumed foundered with the loss of all hands.
Corsica	United States	The brig was wrecked on Anegada, Bahamas. Her crew survived. She was on a voyage from Gibraltar to Veracruz, Mexico.
Lady Ridley	United Kingdom	The ship was driven ashore and wrecked at Bailey's Mistake, Newfoundland, British North America. Her eighteen crew were rescued.
Mary Graham	United Kingdom	The ship was in collision with another vessel in the Irish Sea. She was abandoned the next day off the Wicklow Sandbank.

== 12 November ==
List of shipwrecks: 12 November 1831
Ship	State	Description
Britannia	United Kingdom	The ship was wrecked on Amrum, Duchy of Holstein. She was on a voyage from London to Amsterdam, North Holland, Netherlands.
Charles Kerr	United Kingdom	The ship departed from Macao on this date. Presumed foundered in the Gulf of Siam.
Christian	United Kingdom	The ship was wrecked on "Sescar Island". Her crew were rescued. She was on a voyage from Saint Petersburg, Russia to Arbroath, Forfarshire.
Heroine	United Kingdom	The ship was driven ashore and wrecked of Læsø, Denmark. Her crew were rescued. She was on a voyage from Saint Petersburg to London.

== 13 November ==
List of shipwrecks: 13 November 1831
Ship	State	Description
Bell and Mary	United Kingdom	The ship foundered in the North Sea with the loss of all five of her crew. She was on a voyage from Montrose, Forfarshire to Leith, Lothian.
Charles and Jean	United Kingdom	The ship foundered off Gardenstown, Aberdeenshire with the loss of all hands.
Constantia	Bremen	The ship was wrecked off Borkum, Kingdom of Hanover. She was on a voyage from Rönnebeck to Great Yarmouth, Norfolk, United Kingdom.
Hoopup	Prussia	The ship was wrecked at Norden, Kingdom of Hanover.
James Grant	United Kingdom	The ship was driven ashore and wrecked 11 nautical miles (20 km) from Liebau, Prussia with the loss of eleven of her crew. She was on a voyage from Saint Petersburg, Russia to London.
Mary Ann	United Kingdom	The ship was driven ashore near Stranraer, Wigtownshire. She was on a voyage from "Bellyharnaw" to Glasgow, Renfrewshire.
Regalia	United Kingdom	The ship foundered in Liverpool Bay off Southport, Lancashire. She was on a voyage from Liverpool, Lancashire to Lisbon, Portugal.
Union	Bremen	The ship was lost in the North Sea off the Newarp Lightship ( Trinity House). She was on a voyage from Bahia, Brazil to Bremen.

== 14 November ==
List of shipwrecks: 14 November 1831
Ship	State	Description
Ambrook	United Kingdom	The ship was driven ashore and wrecked east of Newhaven, Sussex. Her crew were rescued. She was on a voyage from Newcastle upon Tyne, Northumberland to Shoreham-by-Sea, Sussex.
Johansen	Denmark	The ship was driven ashore at Helsingborg. She was on a voyage from Riga, Russia to Dunkirk, Nord, France.
Maria	(Denmark) Duchy of Holstein	The ship was wrecked near Ahrenshoop, Prussia with the loss of all hands. She was on a voyage from Eckernförde to London, United Kingdom.
Maria	United Kingdom	The ship was wrecked in the Magdalen Islands, Lower Canada, British North America. Her crew survived. She was on a voyage from Quebec City, Lower Canada to Greenock, Renfrewshire.

== 15 November ==
List of shipwrecks: 15 November 1831
Ship	State	Description
Elliot	United Kingdom	The ship was driven ashore on Bornholm, Denmark. Her crew were rescued. She later refloated, no further trace.
Fanny	United Kingdom	The ship was driven ashore at Sea Palling, Norfolk. Her crew were rescued. She was on a voyage from Liverpool, Lancashire to Hull. Yorkshire.
Perina	Stettin	The ship was wrecked near Strömstad, Sweden. Her crew were rescued. She was on a voyage from Stettin to Hull.

== 16 November ==
List of shipwrecks: 16 November 1831
Ship	State	Description
Alicia	United Kingdom	The sloop sank at Liverpool, Lancashire.
Amelia	United Kingdom	The ship was driven ashore near "the Potteries". She was on a voyage from Arkhangelsk, Russia to Liverpool.
Fanny	United Kingdom	The ship was driven ashore and wrecked at Ballyferris Point, County Down. She was on a voyage from Wick, Caithness to Dublin.
Gibraltar Packet	United Kingdom	The ship sailed from Youghal, County Cork for Brixham, Devon. No further trace, presumed foundered with the loss of all hands.
William and Ann	United Kingdom	The ship was driven ashore at Sunderland, County Durham.

== 17 November ==
List of shipwrecks: 17 November 1831
Ship	State	Description
Montreal	United Kingdom	The ship was driven ashore in the Humber. She was on a voyage from Hull, East Riding of Yorkshire to New York, United States.
Narcissus	United Kingdom British North America	The ship was wrecked near "Fermose", Newfoundland. She was on a voyage from Dundee, Forfarshire to Saint John, New Brunswick, British North America.

== 18 November ==
List of shipwrecks: 18 November 1831
Ship	State	Description
Robert	United Kingdom	The ship was wrecked at sea with the loss of four of her eleven crew. Survivors were rescued by Iris ( Bremen). Robert was on a voyage from Riga, Russia to Plymouth, Devon. She was taken into "Kingskisping", Jutland in March 1832.
Union	United Kingdom	The ship foundered off Neuwerk, Kingdom of Hanover. Six of her crew were rescued. She was on a voyage from Bahia, Brazil to Bremen.

== 19 November ==
List of shipwrecks: 19 November 1831
Ship	State	Description
Hazard	United Kingdom	The ship sank at Rye Harbour, Sussex. Her crew were rescued. She was on a voyage from Newcastle upon Tyne, Northumberland to Portsmouth, Hampshire.
Integrity	United Kingdom	The ship was driven ashore and wrecked at Havre de Grâce, Seine-Inférieure, France. She was on a voyage from Newcastle upon Tyne to Havre de Grâce.
Peter Felix	France	The ship sprang a leak and foundered in The Downs. Her crew were rescued by George the Third (United Kingdom). She was on a voyage from Saint-Valery-sur-Somme, Somme to Bordeaux, Gironde.
Surprise	United Kingdom	The ship was driven ashopre at the mouth of the Authie, Pas-de-Calais, France. She was on a voyage from Dublin to London.

== 20 November ==
List of shipwrecks: 20 November 1831
Ship	State	Description
Alexander Adam	United Kingdom	The ship was driven ashore at Margate, Kent. She was on a voyage from Alicante, Spain to London. She was refloated on 22 November and taken in to Margate.
Aurea	United Kingdom	The ship was wrecked in the Baltic Sea off Öland, Sweden. She was on a voyage from Saint Petersburg, Russia to Hull, Yorkshire.

== 21 November ==
List of shipwrecks: 21 November 1831
Ship	State	Description
Amie	France	The fishing vessel was driven ashore and wrecked near Rye, Sussex, United Kingdom. Her 30 crew were rescued.
Henry	United Kingdom	The ship was wrecked near Cowbridge, Glamorgan with the loss of all hands. She was on a voyage from Baltimore, County Cork to Bristol, Gloucestershire.
William and Betsey	United Kingdom	The ship ran aground on the Sizewell Sandbank, in the North Sea off the coast of Suffolk. She was consequently beached at Aldeburgh, Suffolk. Her crew were rescued. William and Betsey was on a voyage from Perth to London. She was refloated on 25 November and taken in to Southwold, Suffolk.

== 22 November ==
List of shipwrecks: 22 November 1831
Ship	State	Description
David Ricardo	United Kingdom	The ship was driven ashore at Vlissingen, Zeeland, Netherlands. She was on a voyage from Antwerp Belgium to Riga, Russia.
Henry	United Kingdom	The ship was wrecked near Cowbridge, Glamorgan with the loss of all hands. She was on a voyage from Baltimore, County Cork to Cardiff, Glamorgan.
Lord Wellington	United Kingdom	The ship was driven ashore at Point-aux-Caux, British North America. Her crew were rescued. She was on a voyage from Chatham, Kent to Quebec City, Lower Canada, British North America.
Maria	United Kingdom	The ship was driven ashore near Stralsund, Prussia.
Phœnix	Denmark	The brig ran aground off Kungsbaka, Sweden and was wrecked. She was on a voyage from Kiel, Duchy of Holstein to Goole, Yorkshire, United Kingdom.
Roseau	(United Kingdom of Great Britain and Ireland) British North America	The ship was wrecked at Point Sapean, New Brunswick. Her crew were rescued.
Rover	United Kingdom	The ship was wrecked on Fair Isle, either with the loss of all but two of her crew, or without loss.
William	United Kingdom	The ship was wrecked on the Dunbar Sand, off Padstow, Cornwall with the loss of all hands.

== 24 November ==
List of shipwrecks: 24 November 1831
Ship	State	Description
Ben Lomond	United Kingdom	The ship was driven ashore at Nidingen, Sweden. She was on a voyage from Helsingør, Denmark to Hull, Yorkshire.
Fancy	United Kingdom	The ship departed from Jersey, Channel Islands for Lisbon, Portugal. No further trace, presumed foundered with the loss of all hands.
William	United Kingdom	The ship was run into by another vessel at Poole, Dorset and sank.

== 25 November ==
List of shipwrecks: 25 November 1831
Ship	State	Description
Neptune	United Kingdom	The ship struck a rock and sank in Porthkerry Bay. She was on a voyage from Newport, Monmouthshire to Wexford.
Orion	United Kingdom	The ship was driven ashore at Sandhale, Lincolnshire. She was on a voyage from Caernarfon to Hull, Yorkshire.

== 26 November ==
List of shipwrecks: 26 November 1831
Ship	State	Description
Campion	United Kingdom	The ship was lost in the Baltic Sea.
Shaw Stewart	United Kingdom	The sloop was wrecked near Oysterhaven, County Cork. Her four crew were rescued. She was on a voyage from Greenock, Renfrewshire to Limerick.

== 27 November ==
List of shipwrecks: 27 November 1831
Ship	State	Description
Aid	United Kingdom	The ship was wrecked on the Blackwater Bank, in the Irish Sea off the coast of County Wexford. Her crew were rescued.
Henri	France	The ship sank on the Banjaard Sand, in the North Sea off the coast of Belgium. She was on a voyage from Bordeaux, Gironde to Antwerp, Belgium.
Horatio	United Kingdom	The ship ran aground on the Blackwater Bank. She was consequently beached at Cahore Point. Horatio was on a voyage from Liverpool, Lancashire to Newfoundland, British North America.
Nancy	United Kingdom	The ship foundered in Babbacombe Bay.
St. Patrick	United Kingdom	The steamship was driven ashore and wrecked near the Hook Lighthouse, County Wexford. Her crew were rescued.

== 28 November ==
List of shipwrecks: 28 November 1831
Ship	State	Description
Argyle	United Kingdom	The ship foundered in the Atlantic Ocean off Cape Wrath, Sutherland. Her crew were rescued. She was on a voyage from the Shetland Islands to Dublin.
Lloyd's	United Kingdom	The ship was wrecked on Graemsay, Orkney Islands. She was on a voyage from Fraserburgh, Aberdeenshire to an Irish port.
Trusty	United Kingdom	The brig was wrecked on a sandbank off the Dutch coast with the loss of all nine of her crew. She was on a voyage from East Wemyss, Fife to Rotterdam, South Holland, Netherlands.

== 29 November ==
List of shipwrecks: 29 November 1831
Ship	State	Description
Joyeuse Ariveé	Belgium	The galiot was in collision with another vessel in Dublin Bay and foundered. Her crew were rescued by Deux Frères (France). Joyeuse Ariveé was on a voyage from Liverpool, Lancashire, United Kingdom to Antwerp.
Louisa Wilhelmina	Stettin	The ship was wrecked on the Long Sand, in the North Sea off the coast of Essex, United Kingdom. Her crew were rescued. She was on a voyage from Stettin to London.
Samuel	United Kingdom	The ship departed from Newry, County Antrim for London. No further trace, presumed foundered with the loss of all hands.

== 30 November ==
List of shipwrecks: 30 November 1831
Ship	State	Description
John Danford	United Kingdom	The ship sprang a leak and was abandoned in the Atlantic Ocean. Her crew were rescued by Favourite (United Kingdom). John Danford was on a voyage from Miramichi, New Brunswick, British North America to London.
Lively	United Kingdom	The ship foundered in the North Sea off Rattray Head, Aberdeenshire with the loss of her captain. She was on a voyage from Banff, Aberdeenshire to Leith, Lothian.
Venus	United Kingdom	The ship was wrecked on the Whitford Sands, in the Bristol Channel off Neath, Glamorgan.
Vigilant	United Kingdom	The ship was wrecked on the North Bank, in Liverpool Bay. Her crew were rescued. She was on a voyage from Newport, Monmouthshire to Liverpool, Lancashire.

== Unknown date ==
List of shipwrecks: Unknown date 1831
Ship	State	Description
Abeona	United Kingdom	The ship foundered off Texel, North Holland, Netherlands.
Acorn	United Kingdom	The ship was driven ashore on the Dutch coast in mid-November.
Ben Lomond	United Kingdom	The ship was driven ashore in the Kattegat after 22 November. She was on a voyage from Helsingør, Denmark to Hull, Yorkshire.
Britannia	United Kingdom	The ship was wrecked at Hamburg before 25 November.
Britannia	United Kingdom	The ship was lost near Zandvoort, North Holland before 28 November. She was on a voyage from Texel to Sunderland, County Durham.
Briton	United Kingdom	The ship was driven ashore on Götaland, Sweden. She was burnt by order of the authorities there. Briton was on a voyage from Saint Petersburg, Russia to London.
Carl Ludwig	Norway	The ship was lost during November.
Christian	United Kingdom	The ship was wrecked on "Sescaar Island" before 12 November. Her crew were rescued. She was on a voyage from Saint Petersburg to Arbroath, Forfarshire.
Columbus	United Kingdom	The ship foundered whilst on a voyage from Saint Petersburg to London.
Concordia	United Kingdom	The ship foundered off Texel.
Elliot	United Kingdom	The ship was wrecked on Bornholm, Denmark.
Hammerfest	Norway	The ship foundered off Haröe Island, Greenland in late November.
Harmony	United Kingdom	The whaler was wrecked on the coast of Yorkshire in early November.
Heroyquor	United Kingdom	The ship was wrecked on Læsø, Denmark. She was on a voyage from Saint Petersburg to London.
Herrings	United Kingdom	The ship was wrecked on the Sunk Sand, in the North Sea off the coast of Essex. Her crew were rescued.
James	United Kingdom	The ship was driven ashore near Liebau, Prussia. She was on a voyage from Saint Petersburg to London.
Kains	(United Kingdom of Great Britain and Ireland) New South Wales	The ship was wrecked in the Tamar River, Van Diemens Land in early December.
Leslie Gault	United Kingdom	The steamship foundered off Barra Head, Outer Hebrides. She was on a voyage from Belfast, County Antrim to the Clyde.
London Merchant	United Kingdom	The steamship was driven ashore in the Maas.
Madeira Packet	(United Kingdom of Great Britain and Ireland) New South Wales	The whaler, a schooner, was wrecked north of Moreton Bay in late November.
Malay	United Kingdom	The ship was lost on Basque Island, "below Green Island" before 11 November. She was on a voyage from Liverpool, Lancashire to Quebec City, Lower Canada, British North America.
Meredith	United Kingdom	The ship was wrecked on the coast of Labrador, British North America.
Methlin	United Kingdom	The brig was wrecked at L'Islet, Lower Canada with some loss of life. She was on a voyage from Quebec City, Lower Canada to Liverpool.
Navarino	United Kingdom	The ship was wrecked at Arkhangelsk, Russia.
North Star	(United Kingdom of Great Britain and Ireland) British North America	The ship was destroyed by fire at Canso, Nova Scotia. She was on a voyage from Halifax, Nova Scotia to Saint John's, Newfoundland.
Ocean	United Kingdom	The ship was abandoned in the Baltic Sea off Götaland. Her crew were rescued by Cordelia (United Kingdom). Ocean was on a voyage from Saint Petersburg to London.
Relief	(United Kingdom of Great Britain and Ireland) British North America	The ship was wrecked on Cape Breton Island, Nova Scotia. She was on a voyage from Halifax to Quebec City.
Sisters	United Kingdom	The ship foundered in the Gulf of Finland. She was on a voyage from Saint Petersburg to London.
South Esk	United Kingdom	The ship foundered in the North Sea. Her crew were rescued by Lively (United Kingdom). She was on a voyage from Saint Petersburg to Dundee, Forfarshire.
Southwark	United Kingdom	The brig was abandoned in the North Sea (55°35′N 3°12′E). Her crew were rescued by the schooner Lively.
Trusty	United Kingdom	The ship was driven ashore between Noordwijk and Zandvoort, North Holland, Netherlands with the loss of all hands.
Vigilant	United Kingdom	The ship foundered in the Gulf of Finland. She was on a voyage from Saint Petersburg to London.
Vrow Angelina	Netherlands	The ship was driven ashore on Scharhörn, Hamburg before 22 November. She was refloated but was subsequently wrecked on the Whitt Sand with the loss of all but one of her crew. Vrow Angelina was on a voyage from Sunderland to Amsterdam, North Holland.
Zamfonn	United Kingdom	The ship was lost near Brest, Finistère, France in early November.
Zealous	United Kingdom	The ship sprang a leak and was abandoned in the Gulf of Saint Lawrence in early November.
