= Alfred (East Indiaman) =

Two vessels served the British East India Company (EIC) as East Indiamen named Alfred:

- Alfred (1772 EIC ship) was launched in 1772 and made four voyages for the EIC before she was sold in 1786 for hulking or breaking up.
- Alfred (1790 EIC ship) was launched in 1790 and made eight voyages for the EIC before she was sold in 1812 for hulking. In 1804 she engaged French warships during the Battle of Pulo Aura.

Additionally, the following vessel made one voyage under charter to the EIC:

- Alfred (1818 ship) was launched at Chittagong in 1818 and between 1827 and 1828 made a voyage for the EIC as an "extra ship". In 1845 she was condemned but new owners restored her and named her Deutschland. She was last listed in 1857.
