= List of shipwrecks in September 1842 =

The list of shipwrecks in September 1842 includes ships sunk, foundered, wrecked, grounded, or otherwise lost during September 1842.

== 1 September ==
List of shipwrecks: 1 September 1842
Ship	State	Description
Evelina	France	The ship was wrecked near Fort Royal, Martinique.
Guor or Zior	United Kingdom	The brig was driven ashore on Fårö, Sweden. She was later refloated and resumed her voyage.

== 2 September ==
List of shipwrecks: 2 September 1842
Ship	State	Description
Aurora	United Kingdom	The ship caught fire and was scuttled at Plymouth, Devon. She was refloated on 3 September and taken into Sutton Pool.
Brigand	United Kingdom	The ship was driven onto rocks at "Typa" and was severely damaged.
Challenge	United Kingdom	The ship was driven ashore and wrecked near Musquash, New Brunswick, British North America. All on board were rescued. She was on a voyage from New York, United States to Saint John, New Brunswick.
Dan	United Kingdom	The ship was driven ashore at Dove Point. She was on a voyage from Liverpool, Lancashire to Rio de Janeiro, Brazil. She was refloated and put back to Liverpool.
Henry Davidson	United Kingdom	The ship was wrecked off "Pedro Banca", in the Strait of Singapore with the loss of two of her crew. She was on a voyage from Singapore to China.
Hope	United Kingdom	The ship was driven ashore and wrecked at the mouth of the Belfast Lough. She was on a voyage from South Shields, County Durham to Swansea, Glamorgan.
Mary	United Kingdom	The ship was driven ashore on the "Heo". She was on a voyage from Newcastle upon Tyne, Northumberland to Quillebeuf-sur-Seine, Eure, France. She was later refloated and taken into Havre de Grâce, Seine-Inférieure, France in a severely leaky condition.
Rocked	United Kingdom	The ship arrived at Saint Helena with damage sustained on the coast of Africa and was consequently condemned. She was on a voyage from Africa to Liverpool, Lancashire.

== 3 September ==
List of shipwrecks: 3 September 1842
Ship	State	Description
Henry Davidson	United Kingdom	The ship was wrecked on the Pedra Branca Reef with the loss of two of her crew. She was on a voyage from Bombay, India to China.
Impulse	United Kingdom	The ship was wrecked on the Cayugus Reef. All on board were rescued. She was on a voyage from Baltimore, Maryland, United States to Jamaica.
Westchester	United Kingdom	The ship was driven ashore and damaged at Hampstead, New York, United States. All 279 people on board were rescued. She was on a voyage from Liverpool, Lancashire to New York City. She was later refloated and taken into New York City.

== 4 September ==
List of shipwrecks: 4 September 1842
Ship	State	Description
Catherine	United States	The ship was driven ashore and wrecked at Matanzas, Cuba. Her crew were rescued. She was on a voyage from Charleston, South Carolina to New Orleans, Louisiana.
Condor	(United Kingdom of Great Britain and Ireland) British North America	The ship was wrecked on the French Keys Reef. Her crew were rescued. She was on a voyage from Jamaica to Halifax, Nova Scotia.
Louisa	France	The ship was driven ashore on Fire Island, New York. She was on a voyage from Marseille, Bouches-du-Rhône to New York City. She had become a wreck by 24 September.
McLellan	United Kingdom	The brig was driven ashore at "Cora Blanco", Cuba.
Najaden	(Russian Empire) Grand Duchy of Finland	The ship was driven ashore and wrecked near Helsingborg, Sweden. She was on a voyage from Torrevecchia Teatina, Papal States to Bjorneborg.
Ontario	United Kingdom	The barque was driven ashore at "Cora Blanco".
William and Robert	United Kingdom	The ship was wrecked on a reef off Matanzas. She was on a voyage from Matanzas to Cowes, Isle of Wight.
William IV	United Kingdom	The ship was driven ashore at Plymouth, Devon. She was on a voyage from Labrador, British North America to Poole, Dorset. She was refloated the next day.

== 5 September ==
List of shipwrecks: 5 September 1842
Ship	State	Description
Ennis	United Kingdom	The ship departed from Llanelly, Glamorgan for New Ross, County Wexford. No further trace, presumed foundered with the loss of all hands.
Mary Bain	United Kingdom	The ship was wrecked on the Anholt Reef, in the Baltic Sea. Her crew were rescued. She was on a voyage from Newcastle upon Tyne, Northumberland to Stettin.

== 6 September ==
List of shipwrecks: 6 September 1842
Ship	State	Description
Hope	United Kingdom	The ship ran aground at the entrance to Belfast Lough. She was on a voyage from South Shields, County Durham to Swansea, Glamorgan.
Medora	United Kingdom	The lugger was driven ashore and wrecked at Flamborough Head, Yorkshire.
HMS Victor	Royal Navy	The Cruizer-class brig-sloop foundered in a hurricane in the Gulf of Mexico.
William Shand	United Kingdom	The ship was driven ashore and wrecked at "Siekraggen", 8 German miles (32.54 nautical miles (60.26 km)) north of Ventava, Courland Governorate with the loss of seven of her crew. She was on a voyage from Newcastle upon Tyne, Northumberland to Saint Petersburg, Russia.

== 7 September ==
List of shipwrecks: 7 September 1842
Ship	State	Description
Amity	United Kingdom	The smack was wrecked in Sinclairs Bay. Her crew were rescued.
Caledonia	United Kingdom	The brig was wrecked near Morwenstow, Cornwall with the loss of all nine crew. She was on a voyage from Odesa, Russia to Arbroath, Forfarshire.
Catherine	United States	The ship was wrecked at Matanzas, Cuba. Her crew were rescued. She was on a voyage from Charleston, South Carolina to New Orleans, Louisiana.
Mountaineer	United Kingdom	The ship ran aground on The Shingles, off the Isle of Wight. She was on a voyage from Demerara, British Honduras to London. She was later refloated and taken in tow for London.
Oceanus	(United Kingdom of Great Britain and Ireland) British North America	The ship was wrecked on Dominica.
HMRC Swan	Board of Customs	The ship was wrecked near Clovelly, Devon. Her crew survived.

== 8 September ==
List of shipwrecks: 8 September 1842
Ship	State	Description
Alexander	France	The sloop was driven ashore at Hartland, Devon, United Kingdom. Her crew were rescued. She was on a voyage from Paimpol, Côtes-du-Nord to Neath, Glamorgan, United Kingdom.
Alfred and James	United Kingdom	The ship was driven ashore near Southport, Lancashire. She was on a voyage from Lytham St. Annes, Lancashire to an Irish port.
HMRC Gazelle	Board of Customs	The ship was driven ashore and wrecked east of Shipload Bay, Devon. Her crew were rescued.
John & Elizabeth	United Kingdom	The fishing smack was driven ashore and wrecked at Walberswick, Suffolk. Her crew were rescued.
William	United Kingdom	The ship was driven ashore at "Hacksalo", Grand Duchy of Finland. She was on a voyage from Newcastle upon Tyne to Saint Petersburg, Russia. She was refloated on 11 September and taken into Porvoo.
William Shaw	United Kingdom	The barque was abandoned in the Baltic Sea 16 leagues (48 nautical miles (89 km)) south west of the Filsand Lighthouse, Russia. Seven of her crew were rescued by William (United Kingdom). Three remained on board, and were lost when the vessel foundered that night.
Wynyard	United Kingdom	The collier was wrecked at Worthing, Sussex.

== 9 September ==
List of shipwrecks: 9 September 1842
Ship	State	Description
Alexandria	United Kingdom	The ship was wrecked near Hartland Point, Devon. Her crew were rescued. She was on a voyage from "Pampelona" to Neath, Glamorgan.
Auckland	United Kingdom	The ship was wrecked on the Gore Sands, in the Bristol Channel with the loss of all hands. She was on a voyage from Gloucester to Bridgwater, Somerset.
Barlow	United Kingdom	The ship was driven ashore on "Hare Island". She was on a voyage from Quebec City, Province of Canada, British North America to Loch Ryan. She was refloated.
Elizabeth	United Kingdom	The ship was driven ashore and damaged at Bude, Cornwall. She was on a voyage from London to Newport, Monmouthshire. She was refloated.
Futty Salaam	India	The ship was wrecked near Pooree Island. She was on a voyage from Muscat to Calcutta.
Halcyon	United Kingdom	The ship was wrecked on the Gore Sands with the loss of all nine crew.
Jersey Lass	United Kingdom	The ship was driven ashore at Bridgwater. Her crew were rescued. She was on a voyage from Constantinople, Ottoman Empire to Bristol, Gloucestershire.
Ricardo	United Kingdom	The barque capsized in the Hooghly River with the loss of ten lives. She was on a voyage from London to Calcutta.

== 10 September ==
List of shipwrecks: 10 September 1842
Ship	State	Description
Charles Marie	France	The ship ran aground and sank at Honfleur, Calvados.
Elodie Antoine	France	The ship ran aground at Honfleur.
Falkirk	United Kingdom	The schooner was driven ashore and wrecked on Skomer, Pembrokeshire. Her crew were rescued. She was on a voyage from Grangemouth, Stirlingshire to Pembroke.
Humility	United Kingdom	The ship struck the Whitby rock and sank. Her crew were rescued. She was on a voyage from Hartlepool, County Durham to Scarborough, Yorkshire.
RMS Isis	United Kingdom	The paddle steamer ran aground and was damaged on a reef off Puerto Rico. She was on a voyage from Saint Thomas, Virgin Islands to Havana, Cuba. RMS Isis was refloated and made for Jamaica for repairs.
Jason	France	The ship ran aground and sank at Honfleur.
Lucy	United Kingdom	The ship foundered off Holcombe, Devon. Her crew were rescued.
Mercator	Norway	The ship capsized near "Sorem" with the loss of a crew member.
Molly Lloyd	United Kingdom	The sloop was wrecked in Ramsey Sound. She was on a voyage from Cardigan to Bideford, Devon.
Pearl	United Kingdom	The ship was driven onto the Nautees and was then driven onto the Castle Rocks, Aberystwyth, Cardiganshire and was wrecked.
HMS Spitfire	Royal Navy	The paddle steamer was wrecked on the Half Moon Key Reef, off British Honduras with the loss of one life. Over 200 people were rescued.
Unity	United Kingdom	The ship was driven ashore at Ryde, Isle of Wight. She was on a voyage from Cardiff, Glamorgan to Newhaven, Sussex.

== 11 September ==
List of shipwrecks: 11 September 1842
Ship	State	Description
Harmony	United Kingdom	The ship was driven ashore and wrecked on Stroma, Caithness. Her crew were rescued. She was on a voyage from South Shields, County Durham to Dublin.
Maraboo	United Kingdom	The ship ran aground on the Bird Rock. She was on a voyage from Jamaica to London. She was refloated and put back to Jamaica.

== 12 September ==
List of shipwrecks: 12 September 1842
Ship	State	Description
Malabar	United Kingdom	The ship was driven ashore in Table Bay. She was on a voyage from Portsmouth, Hampshire to Calcutta, India. She was refloated.
Troughton	United Kingdom	The ship was wrecked on the Swedish coast. Her crew were rescued. She was on a voyage from London to Saint Petersburg.
Ingermanland	Imperial Russian Navy	The third rate ship of the line was wrecked in a storm on the Syre Sand, 1 Swedish mile (5.77 nautical miles (10.68 km)) off Lista, Norway, then drifted free and sank off Varhaug, Norway, with the loss of 453 of her 986 passengers and crew. She was on a voyage from Arkhangelsk to Kronstadt. Ten crew were rescued by Gipsy (United Kingdom) and ninety by a Royal Danish Navy steamship.

== 13 September ==
List of shipwrecks: 13 September 1842
Ship	State	Description
Bon Accoud	United Kingdom	The ship foundered in the North Sea off the Dutch coast. Her crew were rescued.
Margarita	Spain	The ship ran aground at the mouth of the Palmones. She was on a voyage from Málaga to Havana, Cuba. She was refloated the next day and resumed her voyage.
Ocean Queen	United Kingdom	The barque ran aground and was wrecked at Half Moon Reef, Pelsaert Group, Houtman Abrolhos. The crew escaped to the mainland and eventually made their way back (firstly by boat and then by foot) to Fremantle, except for one crew member who was left behind at the mouth of the Moore River and was later rescued.
Sophia	Norway	The schooner ran aground and was wrecked off Gjedesby.

== 14 September ==
List of shipwrecks: 14 September 1842
Ship	State	Description
Genoveva	Hamburg	The ship was driven ashore on "Laugervog Island". She was on a voyage from Hull, Yorkshire, United Kingdom to Hamburg.

== 15 September ==
List of shipwrecks: 15 September 1842
Ship	State	Description
Orb	United States	The ship departed from Windsor, Nova Scotia, British North America for New York City. No further trace, presumed foundered with the loss of all hands.

== 17 September ==
List of shipwrecks: 17 September 1842
Ship	State	Description
Gabriella	France	The ship was driven ashore on Saltholm, Denmark. She was on a voyage from Saint Petersburg, Russia to Havre de Grâce, Seine-Inférieure.

== 19 September ==
List of shipwrecks: 19 September 1842
Ship	State	Description
Everdina	France	The ship ran aground on the Gronin Bank, in the English Channel. She was on a voyage from Riga, Russia to Rochefort, Charente-Maritime. She was refloated and completed her voyage.
Lanefer	Prussia	The ship was driven ashore on the north west coast of Denmark. She was on a voyage from Königsberg to Antwerp, Belgium. She was later refloated and resumed her voyage.
Pink	United Kingdom	The brigantine was driven ashore and damaged in Killala Bay. She was refloated the next day.

== 20 September ==
List of shipwrecks: 20 September 1842
Ship	State	Description
Sarah	United Kingdom	The ship was driven ashore near Moulmein, Burma. She was on a voyage from Moulmein to London. She was consequently condemned.

== 21 September ==
List of shipwrecks: 21 September 1842
Ship	State	Description
Intellect	United Kingdom	The ship ran aground on the Swinebottoms. She was on a voyage from Helmsdale, Sutherland to Stettin. She was refloated and put into Helsingør, Denmark for repairs.
Marie Louise	Bremen	The ship ran aground off Holtenau, Prussia. She was on a voyage from Bremen to Saint Petersburg, Russia. She was later refloated.
Newburn	United Kingdom	The ship struck a rock and sank in the Rio Grande. Her crew were rescued. She was on a voyage from Mauritius to London.
Peterel	(United Kingdom of Great Britain and Ireland) British North America	The ship was driven ashore and wrecked in St. Mary's Bay. Her crew were rescued.

== 22 September ==
List of shipwrecks: 25 September 1842
Ship	State	Description
Acaster	United Kingdom	The ship departed from Enmore, New South Wales for Calcutta, India. No further trace, presumed wrecked in late September with the loss of all hands.
Enterprise	United Kingdom	The ship was driven ashore on São Miguel Island, Azores.
Naiad	United Kingdom	The brig capsized in the Atlantic Ocean with the loss of eight of her nine crew. The survivor was rescued on 11 November by Shawmut (United States) when the ship was at 28°10′N 58°10′W. Naiad was on a voyage from Halifax, Nova Scotia, British North America to Demerara, British Honduras.
Swinemünde Packet	Belgium	The ship was driven ashore and wrecked at Narva, Russian Empire.

== 23 September ==
List of shipwrecks: 23 September 1842
Ship	State	Description
Abigail	United States	The ship departed from the Turks Islands for Norfolk, Virginia. No further trace, presumed foundered with the loss of all hands.
Euphrosyne	United Kingdom	The ship was driven ashore at Matane, Province of Canada, British North America. She was on a voyage from Quebec City, Province of Canada to Bridgewater, Connecticut, United States.
Lemuel	(United Kingdom of Great Britain and Ireland) British North America	The brig was wrecked off New London, Prince Edward Island. Her crew were rescued. She was on a voyage from Rustic to Casumpec.
Pursuit	United Kingdom	The ship ran aground at Southwold, Suffolk. She was later refloated.

== 25 September ==
List of shipwrecks: 25 September 1842
Ship	State	Description
Cossack	United Kingdom	The ship was driven ashore and damaged on "Scaur Laggan". She was on a voyage from Malta to Glasgow, Renfrewshire. She was refloated and taken into "Dally Bay", where she was beached.
Douglas	United Kingdom	The ship was abandoned in the Atlantic Ocean. Her crew were rescued by Maitland (United Kingdom). Douglas was on a voyage from Caernarfon to Boston, Massachusetts, United States.
Fortuna	Danzig	The ship was wrecked on the Heel Reef, in the Baltic Sea. She was on a voyage from Danzig to London, United Kingdom.
Nonpareil	Spain	The ship was driven ashore east of Cape Palos. She was on a voyage from Dénia to London.
Othlle	Sweden	The ship sprang a leak and sank in the Jeno Sound. She was on a voyage from Stockholm to Stettin.
Stjerkoff	United Kingdom	The ship was wrecked on the east coast of Öland. She was on a voyage from Kristianstad to Grimsby, Lincolnshire, United Kingdom.
Sundia	Stettin	The ship was in collision with Valeria ( Sweden) and foundered in the Kattegat. Her crew were rescued. She was on a voyage from Newcastle upon Tyne, Northumberland, United Kingdom to Stettin.

== 26 September ==
List of shipwrecks: 26 September 1842
Ship	State	Description
Canopia	United Kingdom	The ship ran aground on the Nore and was damaged. She was later refloated and taken into Sheerness, Kent in a leaky condition.
Germany	United States	The ship was wrecked on Gotland, Sweden. She was on a voyage from Saint Petersburg, Russian Empire to New York.
Mathilda	United Kingdom	The ship was driven ashore at Antwerp, Belgium.
Stjerkoff	Sweden	The ship was driven ashore and wrecked at Alby, Öland. She was on a voyage from Kristianstad to Grimsby, Lincolnshire, United Kingdom.
Susan	United Kingdom	The schooner was driven ashore and sank at Margate, Kent. Her five crew were rescued by the luggers Alfred and Rover (both United Kingdom). She was on a voyage from Liverpool, Lancashire to London.

== 27 September ==
List of shipwrecks: 27 September 1842
Ship	State	Description
Adela	Spain	The ship was driven ashore at the mouth of the Guayas River and was severely damaged. She was on a voyage from Cádiz to Guayaquil, Ecuador.
Hamburgh	United Kingdom	The schooner was driven ashore and wrecked at Sheringham, Norfolk. Her crew were rescued by the Sheringham Lifeboat. She was on a voyage from Dundee, Forfarshire to Abbeville, Somme, France.
Jonge Pieter	Netherlands	The ship was driven ashore near Zandvoort, North Holland. She was on a voyage from Sunderland, County Durham, United Kingdom to Amsterdam, North Holland.
Mathilde	Belgium	The ship was driven ashore at Antwerp. She was on a voyage from Odesa to Antwerp. She was refloated the next day and taken into port.
Ruby	United Kingdom	The brig ran aground on the Maplin Sands, in the North Sea off the coast of Essex. She was on a voyage from a Baltic port to London. Ruby was refloated with assistance from the smack Britannia (United Kingdom) and other vessels and resumed her voyage.
Sylph	United Kingdom	The ship ran aground on the Herd Sand and was damaged. She was refloated the next day and put back to South Shields, County Durham.

== 28 September ==
List of shipwrecks: 28 September 1842
Ship	State	Description
Delphine	Sweden	The ship was driven ashore 12 nautical miles (22 km) east of Calais, France with the loss of two of her crew. She was on a voyage from Hull, Yorkshire to Pernambuco, Brazil.
Evander	United Kingdom	The ship foundered in the Firth of Forth. Her crew were rescued. She was on a voyage from Grangemouth, Stirlingshire to Hull.
Fortuna	Danzig	The ship was driven ashore near Hela, Kingdom of Prussia. Her crew were rescued. She was on a voyage from Danzig to London, United Kingdom.
Havfrein	Norway	The brig ran aground and capsized in the English Channel off Gosport, Hampshire, United Kingdom. She was consequently condemned.

== 29 September ==
List of shipwrecks: 29 September 1842
Ship	State	Description
Abeona	United Kingdom	The ship was driven ashore at The Mumbles, Glamorgan. She was refloated on 1 October and resumed her voyage to Gloucester.
Barrington	United Kingdom	The ship ran aground on the Spaniard Sand, in the North Sea off the coast of Kent, and was abandoned by her crew. She was on a voyage from Onega, Russia to Faversham, Kent. Barrington floated off and was taken into the Swale. She was consequently condemned.
Eleanor	United Kingdom	The ship was destroyed by fire at Aleppee.
Elizabeth	United Kingdom	The ship was driven ashore at Grimsby, Lincolnshire. She was on a voyage from Great Yarmouth, Norfolk to South Shields, County Durham.
Heart of Oak	United Kingdom	The ship was driven ashore at Cape San Antonio, Cuba. she was on a voyage from Jamaica to an English port.
Herman	United Kingdom	The brig was driven ashore at Hartlepool, County Durham. She was on a voyage from Liverpool, Lancashire to Riga, Russia.
Pallas	Hamburg	The ship was sighted in the Øresund whilst on a voyage from Memel, Prussia to Montevideo, Uruguay. No further trace, presumed foundered with the loss of all hands.
Susan	United Kingdom	The schooner was driven ashore and wrecked at Margate, Kent. Her crew were rescued.

== 30 September ==
List of shipwrecks: 30 September 1842
Ship	State	Description
Chalecedony	United Kingdom	The ship was abandoned in the Atlantic Ocean. She was on a voyage from Saint John, New Brunswick, British North America to Dundalk, County Louth.
Cygnet	United States	The ship was wrecked at Size Harbour, Labrador, British North America.
Dahlia	United Kingdom	The ship was wrecked on the Pentland Skerries. Her crew were rescued. She was on a voyage from Liverpool, Lancashire to Saint Petersburg, Russia.
Elizabeth	United Kingdom	The ship was driven ashore at Grimsby, Lincolnshire. She was on a voyage from Great Yarmouth, Norfolk to Newcastle upon Tyne, Northumberland. She was refloated the next day and taken into Grimsby.
Helen Marr	Flag unknown	The ship ran aground on a reef south of Bornholm, Denmark. She was on a voyage from Havana, Cuba to Saint Petersburg, Russia. She was refloated the next day but was driven ashore and sank at Rønne on 2 October.
Isabella	United Kingdom	The ship was abandoned in the Atlantic Ocean. She was on a voyage from Liverpool, Lancashire to Calcutta, India.
John	United Kingdom	The brig was driven ashore and severely damaged at Twillingate, Newfoundland, British North America.
Joseph and Mary	(United Kingdom of Great Britain and Ireland) Isle of Man	The ship was driven ashore at Douglas. She was later refloated and put back to Douglas.
Louisa and Frederick	(United Kingdom of Great Britain and Ireland) British North America	The ship was driven ashore and wrecked at Croque, Newfoundland. Her crew were rescued.
Valente	United Kingdom	The ship was driven ashore and capsized at Penzance, Cornwall.

== Unknown date ==
List of shipwrecks: Unknown date in September 1842
Ship	State	Description
Alexander	United Kingdom	The ship was wrecked.
Ann and Mary	United Kingdom	The brig was wrecked on Stroma, Caithness before 12 September. She was on a voyage from Newcastle upon Tyne, Northumberland to Dublin
Atwick	United Kingdom	The ship was driven ashore on Læsø, Denmark. She was on a voyage from Liverpool, Lancashire to Saint Petersburg, Russia. She was refloated and taken into Helsingør, Denmark, where she arrived on 24 September.
Boston Packet	United States	The ship was abandoned in the Atlantic Ocean before 8 September.
Clio	United Kingdom	The ship was driven ashore at Scarborough, Yorkshire. She was refloated on 21 September and taken into Scarborough.
Dunois	French Navy	The brig was lost in the Gulf of Mexico with the loss of all hands.
Empress	United Kingdom	The schooner was driven ashore and wrecked at L'Anse-au-Loup, Labrador, British North America. She was later refloated and repaired.
Eolo	United States	The ship departed from Philadelphia, Pennsylvania for Palermo, Sicily in early September. No further trace, presumed foundered with the loss of all hands.
George	(United Kingdom of Great Britain and Ireland) British North America	The schooner was driven ashore and wrecked at L'Anse-au-Loup.
Harmony	United Kingdom	The brig was wrecked.
Henry Boyle	United Kingdom	The ship was driven ashore at the Cape of Good Hope. She was on a voyage from Algoa Bay to the Cape of Good Hope. She was consequently condemned.
Lucy	United Kingdom	The schooner was wrecked.
Marjory Lyon	United Kingdom	The brig was wrecked.
Metis Packet	(United Kingdom of Great Britain and Ireland) British North America	The schooner was driven ashore and wrecked at L'Anse-au-Loup.
Middlesex	United Kingdom	The ship was wrecked 20 nautical miles (37 km) south of Cape St. Augustine. All on board were rescued. She was on a voyage from Sydney, New South Wales to London.
Northumberland	United Kingdom	The ship was wrecked at Arkhangelsk, Russia. Her crew were rescued. She was on a voyage from Arkhangelsk to London.
Ocean	United Kingdom	The ship was driven ashore on Skagen, Denmark. She was on a voyage from Liverpool to Aabenraa, Denmark. Ocean was later refloated and taken into Frederikshavn.
Rory O'More	(United Kingdom of Great Britain and Ireland) New Zealand	The schooner was driven ashore in Palliser Bay, New Zealand. She was on a voyage from Akaroa to Wellington.
Sarah and Mary	United Kingdom	The ship sprang a leak and put into Malin Beg, County Donegal, where she was abandoned. She was on a voyage from Sligo to London. Sarah and Mary was taken into Killybegs, County Donegal in a waterlogged condition on 6 September.
Swan	United Kingdom	The ship was driven ashore and sank at Margate, Kent.
Swinemunde	United Kingdom	The ship was driven ashore and wrecked at Narva, Russia.
