= Kenn Reef =

Reef in Queensland, Australia

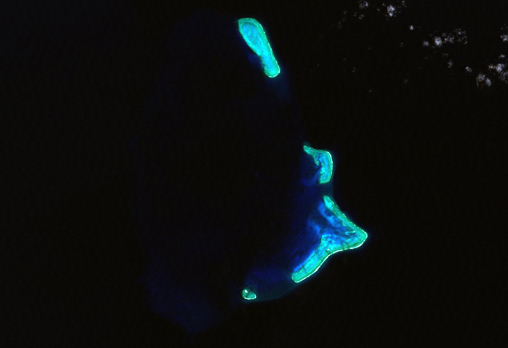
- Satellite image of Kenn Reef

- Location within Pacific Ocean
- Named seamounts in Tasmantid Seamount Chain with Kenn Reef labelled in red (red pushpins – coral reefs, yellow pushpins – seamounts)

Location
- Location: 280 nmi (520 km; 320 mi) northeast from Gladstone, Queensland
- Group: Tasmantid Seamount Chain
- Coordinates: 21°16′S 155°48′E

Geology
- Type: Atoll

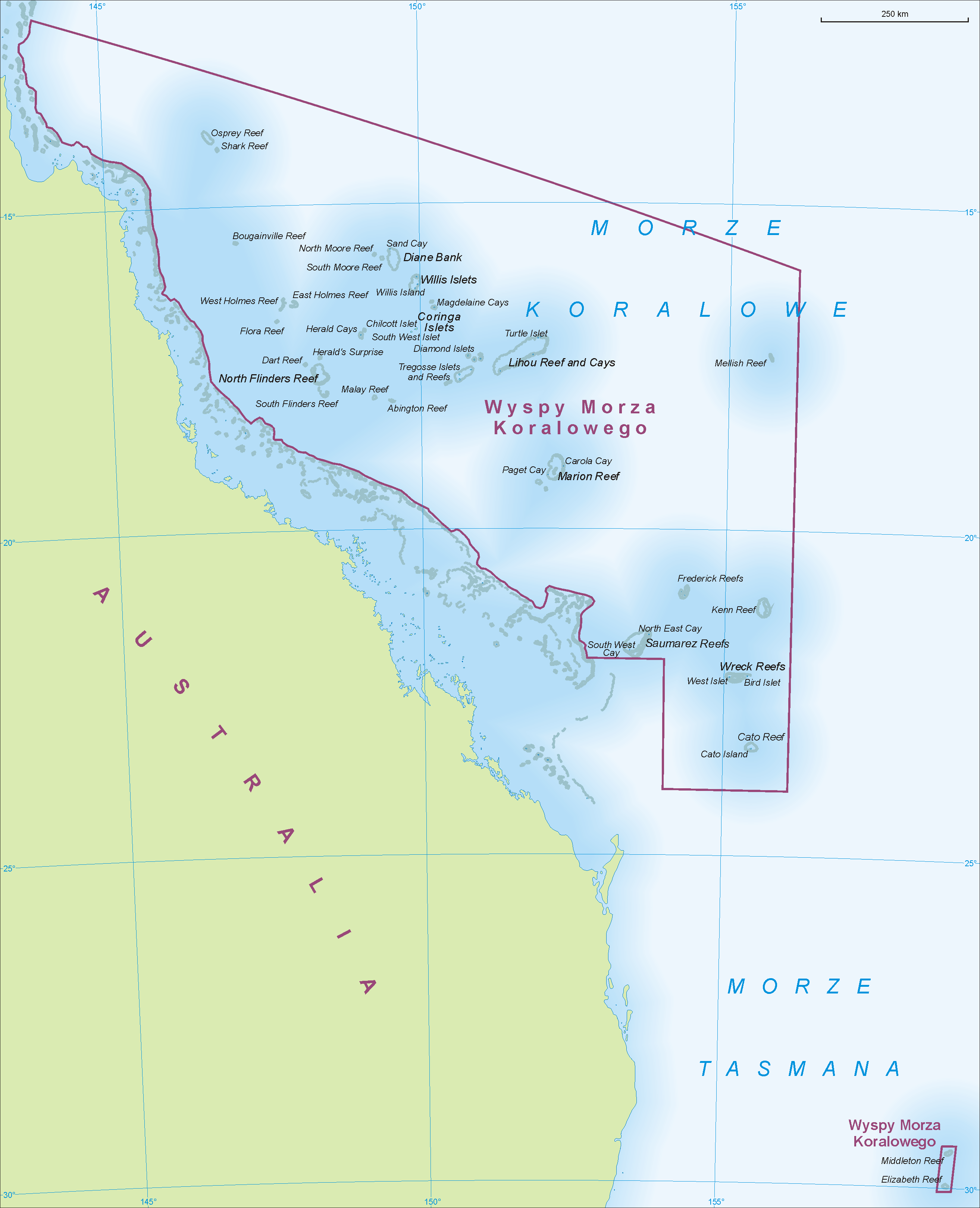
Map of the Coral Sea Islands with Kenn Reef at southeast corner of outlined area

Kenn Reef is a submerged coral atoll off the Pacific coast of Queensland, Australia. It is about 15 by 8 km (9.3 by 5.0 mi) and appears as either a backward facing "L" or a boot. The reef covers an area of approximately 40 km^{2} (15 sq mi), with an islet in the southeast part of the reef called Observatory Cay which is approximately 2 m (6 ft 7 in) above the high tide sea level.

It is part of the Coral Sea Islands and is over 280 nautical miles (520 kilometres; 320 miles) northeast from Gladstone, Queensland.

Kenn Reef is located on part of a submerged continental block, called the Kenn Plateau. This block drifted from Australia around 64 to 52 million years ago. The atoll is believed to be volcanic in origin being on top of one of the Tasmantid Seamounts.

The reef was discovered by Mr. Alexander Kenn, master of the ship William Shand, on her passage from Sydney to Batavia,

== General ==
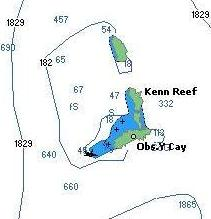
Map of Kenn Reef

Kenn Reef is a remotely situated reef in the south eastern waters of the Coral Sea, it lies approximately 100 km (62 mi) northeast from Bird Islet part of the Wreck Reefs and 140 km (87 mi) southeast from the Frederick Reefs; the Bellona Reefs of New Caledonia are located a further 277 km (172 mi) to the east, with the Australian mainland being located over 500 km (310 mi) to the southwest.

Kenn Reef is part of a submerged continental block, called the Kenn Plateau. The Kenn Plateau lies off the north eastern Australian coast and is a region characterised by a series of prominent, bathymetric troughs and marginal plateaux. And is submerged by 1,000 m (3,300 ft) to over 3,000 m (9,800 ft) of water. The Kenn Plateau, covers around 100,000 km^{2} (39,000 sq mi), an area larger than the Tasmanian landmass.

Various islands and reefs, whose origin is thought to be related to the Tasmantid Seamount Chain, lie along the western margin of the Kenn Plateau and include the well known Kenn Reef and Bird and Cato Island.

The Kenn Plateau is thought to have formed as a sliver of continental crust, resulting from the rifting and seafloor spreading that occurred between 95 and 52 million years ago, along the eastern Australian margin forming the Tasman and Coral Sea basins.

The Kenn Reef areas consists of four main reefs which cover an area of approximately 40 km^{2} (15 sq mi) looking like a backward facing L-shaped structure (or boot) of 15 km (9.3 mi) in length, with a maximum width of 8 km (5.0 mi) along the southern edge.

The three southerly reefs (the toe, foot, ankle and shin of the boot) lie upon a common shelf from which the northern (leg) reef is separated from by a deep channel. The smallest unit and most westerly of this chain (the toe), contains a conspicuous boulder, 1.8 m high, on its northeast side, which from a distance appears as part of a wreck. Landing can be made on the southwest side of the reef. An exposed wreck of a long liner lies on the south side of the reef.

The ankle or the South Eastern reef is the largest reef and with two sand cays on the southwest part of the reef the only permanently emergent land the tiny Observatory Cay 21°16′S 155°48′E, which is about cvt|100| by |50|m}} in area and 2 m (6 ft 7 in) high with a little vegetation. The western side of the ankle of the reef complex forms a bay All the reefs dry at half-tide, and the sea breaks over all of them except for the South Western reef.

The Northern (or leg) reef encloses a shallow lagoon, which is entered on its western side near the southern end.

== History ==
Kenn's Reef was discovered on 3 April 1824 by Alexander Kenn, Master of the ship William Shand, on her passage from Sydney to Batavia (modern day Jakarta) and was described as "extending in the direction of North West by North 1/2 North for ten miles, and is composed of sand and rocks, some of which, at the south end, were six or eight feet out of the water: it is six miles broad; the centre of the edge (? north) is in latitude 21 degrees 9 minutes, and longitude 155 degrees 49 minutes (by chronometer and lunars): it was found to bear South 67 degrees West, six miles from Bird Islet, of Wreck Reef"

The William Shand at the time was considered a new fast sailing ship owned by Lumsdon & Co with the vessel constructed in 1818 in Sunderland, UK. The vessel was single deck ship with beams; sheathed in copper in 1822 and with a displacement of 294 tons and a draft under load of 15 feet and had already made several trips from the UK to Hobart and Sydney carrying cargo (typically with a cargo of cedar, oil, and other articles, procured in the Colony for the return journey) and both steerage and Cabin Passengers

Captain Alexander Kenn, master of the ship William Shand died on or about 7 February 1829 at Launceston in Van Diemen's Land

== Known shipwrecks on the reef ==
=== Bona Vista ===
Bona Vista 18 March 1828 Kenn Reef, 280 miles east of Mackay; Ship; an anchor still visible on Kenn Reef (?) may be from the "Bona Vista" wrecked there on 18 March 1828. Capt. Robert Towns and crew spent several weeks on the reef before being rescued by the "Asia".

=== Jenny Lind ===
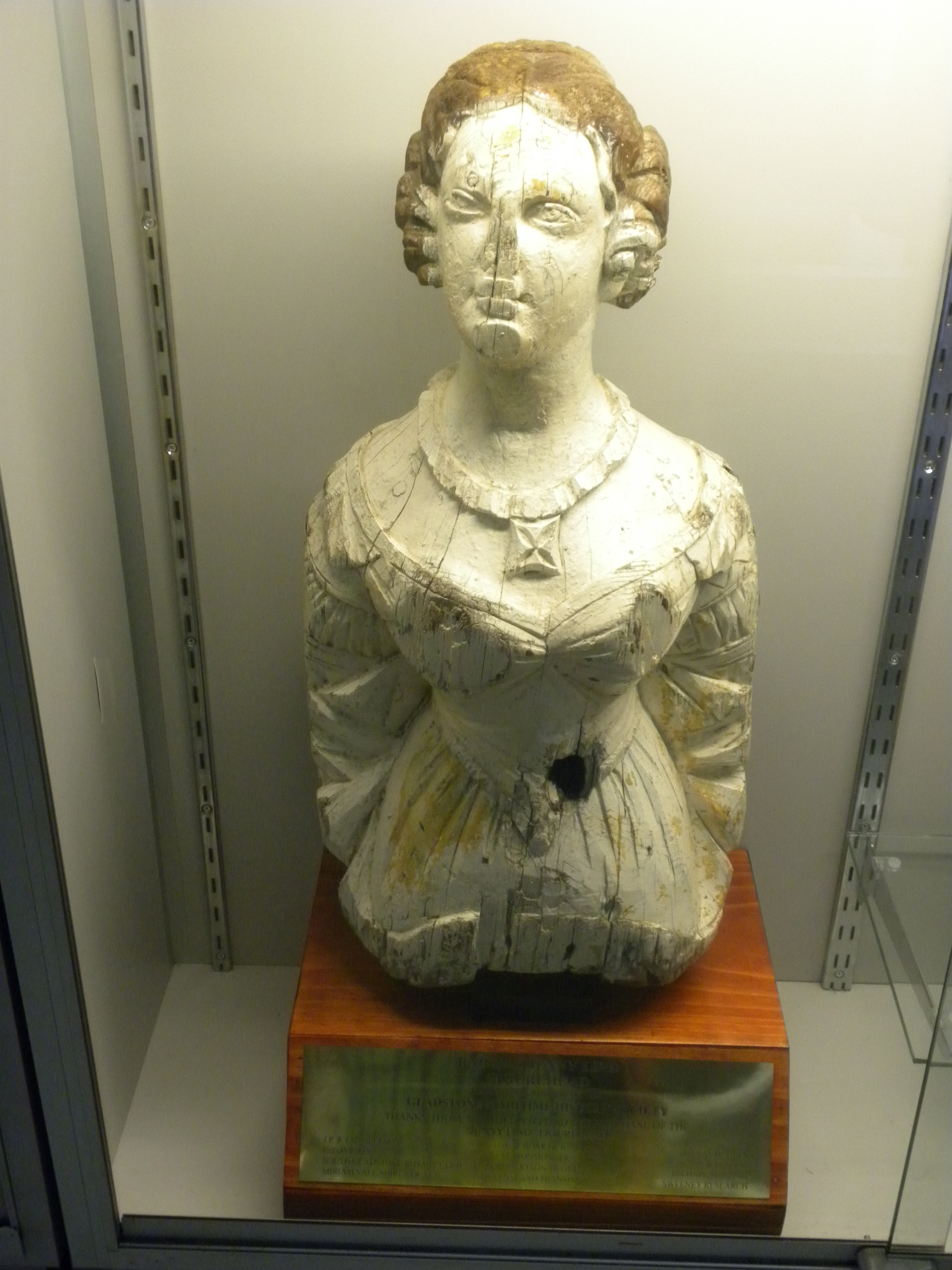
Jenny Lind figurehead, shipwrecked 1850

Jenny Lind Wrecked 21 September 1850 while underway from Melbourne to Singapore under the command of Joseph Taylor struck Kenn Reef, 280 miles east of Mackay. The carvel wooden Barque struck the Reef aft and she lay broadside on with seas pounding over her. 28 passengers and crew landed on a small island and built a boat out of the wreckage. Set out with a small supply of food. No lives lost.

The Jenny Lind was a wooden barque of 484 or 475? ton built in Quebec CANADA Launched Thursday, 15 July 1847 by T.C. Lee, Esq., from his ship-yard, at St. Roch and registered in Plymouth (Registered number: 15/1848) under the owner Brent & Co.

"The Jenny Lind, left Melbourne for Singapore, on Tuesday, 3 September, being chartered to proceed from Singapore to London or Liverpool. The ship's company consisted of Captain Taylor, Mr. Masters, chief mate, Mr. Harpur, second mate, and sixteen seamen and apprentices. The passengers were Mr. Beal, Mr. Noble, Mr. Ackermann, Mrs. Harpur, and Mr and Mrs. Somerset and three children. Mr. Beal, Mr. Noble, and Mrs. Harpur were passengers to London; the others had taken their passage to Singapore. The weather seems to have been very variable until 21 September, no observation having been taken for two days previously, in consequence of the sun being obscured. The chief mate took charge of the watch at ten minutes past four in the morning of the 21st, and enjoined the man on the forecastle to keep a sharp look out, as the sun had not been taken for two days; and at the same time he directed the man at the helm to keep the ship N. by W. The wind at the time was W. by S, and the ship going nine knots through the water. Immediately afterwards the officer of the watch saw something black ahead, and asked the lookout man what it was, and he answered that it was the reflection of a heavy black cloud that was hanging overhead. A quick glance over the gangway seems to have shown the' mate better, and be immediately had the helm port hard up, and all hands called fore and aft. The vessel wore off to the wind, but before the braces could be touched, she struck aft, and immediately afterwards lay broadside on to the reef, the sea making breaches over her. ' The masts were cut away, but the vessel continued to lurch heavily upon the reef, and it was plain that she must soon break up. An attempt was made to launch the pinnace, but this was unsuccessful, and the captain got his leg hurt in the attempt.

After great difficulty the jolly boat was launched, and two hands being placed in her, she was taken to a rock at a short distance, inside the reef, and there secured. The safety boat was then launched, and the difficulty of this process will -be understood when it isremembered that the vessel was nearly on her beam ends, and that the boats had to be hoisted 1 to the davits on the upper quarter, and thence launched into the sea.

When the second boat was launched, the women and children were first taken off in her jolly boat, which served as a temporary depot. In this way all hands were got out in three trips, some of the seamen jumping overboard from the jolly-boat when she was getting overloaded, and holding her on; the water being shoal near the rock.

When all had left the ship, the people were divided in the two boats, and made for a coral bank, partly covered with sand, which lay about half a mile away. This place they all reached in safety. The islet on which they landed was about 150 yards long by 40 wide. In the course of the afternoon some provisions and about four gallons of water were procured from the wreck, and about half a gill of water was served out to each person.

Next day some sails were procured, also some more provisions, and a small keg containing lime juice. The captain had saved some of his charts and nautical instruments, and got them away when the boat left the wreck. A search was made for the mail, but it could not be found, as the vessel was completely bilged, and fast breaking up.

On Monday a copper boiler and some lead piping, together with a cistern, having been procured from the wreck at low water, Mr. Philip Beal (a son, we understand, of the Rev. W. Beal of Exeter, and lately surgeon of the ship Rajah), succeeded in distilling fresh water from the sea water, and half a pint was served to each person that evening; the fuel for the purpose being procured from the wreck.

On the next day, after consultation, it was resolved to attempt the building of a boat large enough to carry all hands in safety to some port, and accordingly three divisions were made of the men; one portion to assist in saving necessary articles from the wreck, another to assist Mr. Beal in distilling water for their sustenance, and the third in building the boat. Some carpenters' tools were procured from the wreck, and timber from time to time, and in this way the judicious arrangements that bad been made were effectively carried out. The men employed at the wreck succeeded in saving many necessary articles, including some clothing; the boat builder's department, under the superintendence of the ship's carpenter, assisted by some persons who had a slight knowledge of boat-building, were actively employed; and Mr. Beal and his assistants were continually engaged in sustaining the lives of the people by distilling the sea water.

An attempt had been made to find fresh water by digging, but the diggers only came on the coral, which afforded to them no more relief than they could get by sucking from it the fresh moisture that had exuded through the sand. During their stay at this solitary, place some relics of former wrecks were found. A rusty chain was discovered on the reef, and some boat boards and other pieces of timber in other places, also some cinders, as if a fire had been made on one of the banks.

By 25 September Mr. Beal had so far improved his machinery by means of articles procured from the wreck, that he was enabled to obtain twenty-five gallons of fresh water that day, and thenceforth the supply to the people was more liberal. The provisions, however, began to get short, and the allowance was reduced to half a pound of flour a day, which had to be made into pudding, with salt water. The little biscuit they had was preserved for a sea stock, as was also all the water that could be put by.

At length, on 26 October, the boat upon which all their hopes depended was launched successfully. It was found that she sat well upon the water, but leaked considerably, and two days more were occupied in repairing that defect, and getting her rigged and stowed. These operations being completed, the adventurers got under way on 29 October, twenty-two persons being in the craft that had been built, and six in the safety boat. They made for Moreton Bay, and the wind was favourable until Saturday last, when it blew from the southward, and they had to cast anchor in a small bay to the southward of Wide Bay, where they saw some natives, but, not liking their manner, refused to allow them on board.

When the wind again shifted they made sail for Brisbane, and, after some difficulty in discovering the mouth of the river, succeeded in reaching within a few miles of the town on Tuesday night, and arrived in Brisbane next morning; all of them, including women and children, being comparatively well and hearty, after having been thirty-seven days on a desolate coral bank in the Pacific.

The preservation of these people is most remarkable. All persons appear to have exerted themselves in an extraordinary mannerly to remedy their condition; but there can be no doubt that to Mr. Beal is due the credit of every life saved, for if he had not brought science to bear upon their difficulties, and supplied them with water when there was scarcely a hope of it, the hot sun of that latitude and the burning sand on which they were encamped, would have made short work with them.

Captain Wickham, on behalf of the government, supplied the shipwrecked mariners with lodging and rations; the females and the children have been quartered with the matron of the immigrant depot, and we believe that the inhabitants generally have exerted themselves to assist the sufferers. Mr. Smith, of the Victoria Hotel, supplied provisions to the men while their rations were being prepared. We are informed that the reef on which the Jenny Lind struck was not laid down on the chart of the Australian coast (dated 1849), with which the ship was provided. The cargo of the Jenny Lind consisted only of a small quantity of flour and beef. We understand that she was partly insured."

=== Alfred Vittery ===
Alfred Vittery Lost 9 March 1884 on Kenn Reef the vessel was built in Brixham UK in 1860 built by J & S Dewdney, a 121-ton, 2 masted schooner trader, launched July 1860. Official no.28947 in 1863, Master Smith, Owner Vittery. Registered DH. In 1876 to Master Johnson, Owner Vittery. In 1877 to Master Gill, Owner Vittery in later times it was owned by Noakes & P.

=== Hester ===
Hester 21 April 1854 Kenn's Reef, 250 miles north of Port Curtis Dutch vessel commanded by Capt A.Vietor. Lost on Kenn's Reef along with other Dutch vessel Doelwijk. They had left Sydney on their way to Batavia. Crew got away in boats and arrived safely in Gladstone. The Hester was a wooden carvel vessel of 856 tons built in Amsterdam, Netherlands by Oranjeboom Werf in 1833 and registered in Amsterdam under the owner Boissevain & Co.

=== Doelwijk ===
Doelwijk 21 April 1854 Kenn's Reef, 250 miles north of Port Curtis. Dutch vessel commanded by Capt J.H. Zeeman. Lost on Kenn's Reef along with another Dutch vessel Hester. They had left Sydney on their way to Batavia. Crew got away in boats but were never seen again. The Doelwijk was a wooden carvel barque of 725 tons built in Kinderdijk, Netherlands in 1850 and registered in Rotterdam.

=== Delta ===
Delta ran aground on Kenn Reef 30 May 1854 under the master of J.G.Kunst the Delta was a wooden carvel 902-ton vessel built in Dordrecht, Netherlands in 1839.

=== Oliver van Noort ===
Oliver van Noort was wrecked on 7 January 1858 on Kenn Reef. The ship ran aground on the same reef within hours of the wreck of Rodney with which it was in company on their way from Sydney to Batavia. Crew rescued. the Oliver van Noort was a wooden carvel barque of 607 tons built in Rotterdam, Netherlands in 1851 and owned by C.Balguerie.

=== Rodney ===
Rodney 7 January 1858 Kenn Reef Barque. Wrecked on Kenn Reef within hours of the wreck of Oliver van Noort on the same reef under the command of Master Bissett. Crew rescued. the Rodney was a wooden carvel ship of 877 tons built in Sunderland, United Kingdom in 1850 registered in London and owned by Green & Co. The Rodney had previously been used in the transportation of convicts and was able to hold 312 convicts on board.

== Notes ==
- Kenn Reef expedition (1970) Fathom magazine
