= Lady Ridley (ship) =

Several vessels have been named Lady Ridley:

- Lady Ridley (1798 ship) was a snow of 175 tons (bm) built by Thomas Walmsley, North Shields.
- Lady Ridley (1813 ship) was launched at Blyth as a West Indiaman. She transported convicts in 1821 to Van Diemen's Land. She also sailed to India under a license from the British East India Company (EIC). She was wrecked on 11 November 1831.
- Lady Ridley (1833 ship) was a schooner of 76 tons (bm (old)), launched at Sunderland. She became a Whitby coaster and was lost in June 1839.
- Lady Ridley (1843 ship) was a schooner of 107 tons (bm (old)), launched at Blythe. She became a Scarborough coaster. She was lost in January 1849.
- Lady Ridley (1849 ship) was a brig of 184 tons (bm (old)), launched at Liverpool. She was lost in September 1857.
