= List of shipwrecks in December 1820 =

The list of shipwrecks in December 1820 includes ships sunk, wrecked, or otherwise lost during December 1820.

== 2 December ==
List of shipwrecks: 2 December 1820
Ship	State	Description
Catherine	United Kingdom	The ship sank at Scarborough, Yorkshire. She was later refloated.
Ceres	United Kingdom	The ship was wrecked in Falmouth Bay, Tristan da Cunha. Her crew were rescued.
Samuel and Jane	United Kingdom	The ship was wrecked on Briar Island, Nova Scotia, British North America. Her crew were rescued.

== 3 December ==
List of shipwrecks: 3 December 1820
Ship	State	Description
Heikman	United Kingdom	The ship was driven ashore at Memel, Prussia.
Hugh Wallace	United Kingdom	The ship was driven ashore at Saltfleet, Lincolnshire. She was on a voyage from Hull, Yorkshire to Liverpool, Lancashire. Hugh Wallace was refloated in mid-December.
Maida	United Kingdom	The ship ran aground off Crab Island whilst on a voyage from Barbados to Bermuda. She was refloated on 5 December and taken in to St. Thomas, Virgin Islands. Maida was declared a total loss.
Margam	United Kingdom	The ship foundered in the Bristol Channel with the loss of all hands. She was on a voyage from a Cornish port to Aberavon, Glamorgan.
Perseverance	United Kingdom	The ship was wrecked near Kilrush, County Clare with the loss of two of her crew. She was on a voyage from Pernambuco, Brazil to Liverpool, Lancashire.

== 4 December ==
List of shipwrecks: 4 December 1820
Ship	State	Description
Christina	United Kingdom	The ship struck a rock in the North Sea off Reculver, Kent and sprang a leak. Whilst making for Margate, Kent she ran aground on the Nayland Rock. Christina refloated the next day and taken in to Margate. She was on a voyage from Seville, Spain to London.
Coventry	United Kingdom	The ship ran aground at Demerara. She was on a voyage from Demerara to London. Coventry was refloated on 9 December.
Eugene	France	The ship was driven ashore in a capsized state near Rottingdean, Sussex, United Kingdom. She was on a voyage from Bordeaux, Gironde to Falkirk, Stirlingshire. United Kingdom
Tobago	United Kingdom	The ship ran aground at Demerara. She was on a voyage from Demerara to London.
Venerable	United Kingdom	The ship ran aground on the Herd Sand, in the North Sea off South Shields, County Durham. She was refloated on 8 December.

== 5 December ==
List of shipwrecks: 5 December 1820
Ship	State	Description
Amsterdam Packet	United States	The ship was abandoned in the Atlantic Ocean. Her crew were rescued by Hannah (United Kingdom). She was on a voyage from Boston, Massachusetts to Málaga, Spain.
August	Prussia	The ship was wrecked near Memel. Her crew were rescued. She was on a voyage from Stettin to Memel.

== 7 December ==
List of shipwrecks: 7 December 1820
Ship	State	Description
Augusta	France	The ship capsized in the English Channel and was driven ashore at Rottingdean, Sussex, United Kingdom. She was on a voyage from Bordeaux, Gironde to Dunkirk, Nord.
Scipio	United Kingdom	The ship was abandoned in the Atlantic Ocean. Her twelve crew were rescued by Hannah (United Kingdom). She was on a voyage from Quebec, British North America to London.

== 8 December ==
List of shipwrecks: 8 December 1820
Ship	State	Description
Eliza	United Kingdom	The ship was sighted off Donaghadee, County Down whilst on a voyage from Dublin to London. No further trace, presumed foundered with the loss of all hands.
Sancho	United Kingdom	The brig was run down and sunk in the North Sea off Great Yarmouth, Norfolk by Baltic Merchant (United Kingdom). Her crew were rescued by Baltic Merchant. She was on a voyage from Hartlepool, County Durham to London.
Virginia	United States	The ship ran aground at Hoylake, Lancashire, United Kingdom, where she was wrecked the next day. She was on a voyage from Virginia to Liverpool, Lancashire.

== 9 December ==
List of shipwrecks: 9 December 1820
Ship	State	Description
James	United Kingdom	The brig foundered in the Atlantic Ocean off Wilmington, Delaware. All on board, over 120 people, were rescued. She was on a voyage from Greenock, Renfrewshire to Wilmington.
Minerva	flag unknown	The ship was driven ashore and wrecked at Dungeness, Kent, United Kingdom. She was on a voyage from "Falkham" to Saint Martins.
Stjernen	Sweden	The ship was driven ashore on the west coast of Gotaland. She was on a voyage from Bergen, Norway to Stockholm.

== 10 December ==
List of shipwrecks: 10 December 1820
Ship	State	Description
Amelia	United States	The ship was driven ashore and wrecked at Cayeux-sur-Mer, Somme, France. She was on a voyage from Baltimore, Maryland to a Dutch port.
Thetis	Sweden	The ship was wrecked on the coast of Jutland. Her crew were rescued. She was on a voyage from Alicante, Spain to Gothenburg.

== 11 December ==
List of shipwrecks: 11 December 1820
Ship	State	Description
Amphitrite	United Kingdom	The ship departed from Newfoundland, British North America for Poole, Dorset. No further trace, presumed foundered in the Atlantic Ocean with the loss of all hands.
Commerce	United Kingdom	The ship was driven ashore and wrecked at Saint John, New Brunswick, British North America. She was on a voyage from Jamaica to St. John.

== 12 December ==
List of shipwrecks: 12 December 1820
Ship	State	Description
Resolution	United Kingdom	The ship foundered in the Irish Sea off Kinsale, County Cork with the loss of a crew member.
Veloz	Portugal	The ship was driven ashore at Pernambuco, Brazil. She was on a voyage from Oporto to Rio de Janeiro, Brazil.

== 13 December ==
List of shipwrecks: 13 December 1820
Ship	State	Description
Barrett	United Kingdom	The ship was abandoned in the Atlantic Ocean. She was on a voyage from Saint John, New Brunswick, British North America to London.
Comet	United Kingdom	The paddle steamer was wrecked at Craignish Point, Oban, Argyllshire. All on board survived.
Endeavour or Euphemia	United Kingdom	The ship ran aground on the Goodwin Sands, Kent. She was refloated but consequently foundered in The Downs with the loss of all but two of her crew. She was on a voyage from South Shields.County Durham to Guernsey, Channel Islands.
Rose	United Kingdom	The ship departed from The Downs for São Miguel Island, Azores. No further trace, presumed foundered with the loss of all hands.

== 14 December ==
List of shipwrecks: 14 December 1820
Ship	State	Description
Martins	United Kingdom	The brig ran aground on the Morant Keys. Her crew were rescued. She was on a voyage from Coro, Gran Colombia to Jamaica. Martins was refloated on 29 December and taken in to Port Royal, Jamaica.
Two Brothers	United Kingdom	The sloop struck a sunken wreck and foundered in the Bay of Biscay off Penmarc'h Point, Finistère, France. Her crew were rescued by La Pierre (France). She was on a voyage from Bilbao, Spain to London.

== 15 December ==
List of shipwrecks: 15 December 1820
Ship	State	Description
Albion	United Kingdom	The ship was driven ashore at "Nannywater", Ireland. She was later refloated.
Bridget	United Kingdom	The ship foundered in the Irish Sea off Dungarvan, County Waterford.
Brother & Sister	United Kingdom	The ship collided with the pier at Shoreham-by-Sea, Sussex and was beached. She was on a voyage from Sunderland, County Durham to Shoreham-by-Sea.
Eliza	United Kingdom	The ship was driven ashore near Cranfield Point, County Down.
Elizabeth	United Kingdom	The ship departed from Cape Broyle, Newfoundland for Figueira da Foz, Portugal. No further trace, presumed foundered with the loss of all hands.
Friends	United Kingdom	The ship was driven ashore at Dungarvan with the loss of all hands.
Fairy	United Kingdom	The ship foundered off Land's End, Cornwall. Her crew were rescued by Eleanor (United Kingdom). Fairy was on a voyage from Newport, Monmouthshire to Penzance, Cornwall.
John and Mary	United Kingdom	The ship was driven ashore at Kinsale, County Cork. Her crew were rescued. She was on a voyage from Cork to Falmouth, Cornwall.
John & Maryann	United Kingdom	The ship was wrecked in Ramsey Bay, Isle of Man. Her crew were rescued.
Queen Charlotte	United Kingdom	The ship was wrecked near Dungarvan with the loss of all hands.
Resolution	United Kingdom	The ship was wrecked near Kinsale. Her crew were rescued. She was on a voyage from Newfoundland, British North America to Liverpool, Lancashire.
Rhoda	United Kingdom	The ship foundered in Dublin Bay with the loss of all but two of her crew.
Thetis	United Kingdom	The sloop was wrecked off the Ballymacotton Tower with the loss of all hands.

== 16 December ==
List of shipwrecks: 16 December 1820
Ship	State	Description
Argo	United Kingdom	The ship ran aground on the Spanish Battery, off the coast of County Durham and was severely damaged. Her crew were rescued. She was refloated on 20 December and taken in to South Shields, County Durham.
Argyle	United Kingdom	The ship was driven ashore at Balbriggan, County Dublin.
Coquette	United Kingdom	The ship was wrecked on the Blackwater Sandbank, in the Irish Sea off Wexford with the loss of all but two of her nineteen crew. She was on a voyage from Liverpool, Lancashire to an African port.
Grape	United Kingdom	The ship was wrecked in the Atlantic Ocean. Her ten crew and both passengers were rescued on 20 December by Dart (United Kingdom). She was o a voyage from Saint John, New Brunswick, British North America to North Shields, County Durham.
Helena	United Kingdom	The ship was wrecked at Ballycastle, County Antrim.
Hope	United Kingdom	The ship was driven ashore and wrecked on Rathlin Island, County Antrim. She was on a voyage from Liverpool, Lancashire to Oban, Argyllshire.
Isabella	United Kingdom	The ship was driven ashore at Omeath, County Louth.
Jeune Charles	France	The ship foundered off Ameland, Friesland, Netherlands. She was on a voyage from Hamburg to Rouen, Seine-Inférieure.
Lord Collingwood	United Kingdom	The ship was wrecked near Youghal, County Cork with the loss of all hands.
Lord Wellington	United Kingdom	The ship was driven ashore and wrecked at Slapton, Devon with the loss of a crew member. She was on a voyage from Sunderland, County Durham to Plymouth, Devon.
Mary	United Kingdom	The brig was driven ashore and wrecked in Dublin Bay.
Minerva	United Kingdom	The ship was driven ashore at Balbriggan.
Sarah & Mary	United Kingdom	The ship was driven ashore and severely damaged at Scarborough, Yorkshire. She was on a voyage from Colchester, Essex to Scarborough.
Sky Lark	United Kingdom	The ship was driven ashore at Teignmouth, Devon with the loss of a crew member. She was on a voyage from London to Haiti. Sky Larkwas refloated on 18 January 1821 and taken in to Teignmouth.
Speculation	United Kingdom	The ship was driven ashore near Scoulaig Ferry, Isle of Bute. She was on a voyage from the Clyde to Berbice.
Thetis	United Kingdom	The ship was lost near Dungarvan, County Waterford. She was on a voyage from Tenby, Pembrokeshire to Cork.
Thomas and Anne	United Kingdom	The sloop foundered in the Bristol Channel between Hartland Point and Lundy Island, Devon. Her crew were rescued. She was on a voyage from Carmarthen to Bristol, Gloucestershire.
Triumph	United Kingdom	The ship was wrecked at Malahide, County Dublin. Her crew were rescued. She was on a voyage from Liverpool to Dublin.

== 17 December ==
List of shipwrecks: 17 December 1820
Ship	State	Description
Elizabeth	United Kingdom	The ship ran aground on the Home Sand, in the North Sea off the coast of Suffolk. She was on a voyage from Hamburg to Bristol, Gloucestershire.
Fairy	United Kingdom	The ship foundered in the Atlantic Ocean off Land's End, Cornwall. Her crew were rescued by Eleanor (United Kingdom).
Helma	United Kingdom	The ship was wrecked at Ballycastle, County Antrim.
Isea	United Kingdom	The ship sank in St George's Channel. Her crew were rescued.
Maygam	United Kingdom	The sloop foundered in the Bristol Channel off Aberavon, Glamorgan with the loss of all hands.

== 18 December ==
List of shipwrecks: 18 December 1820
Ship	State	Description
Betty	United Kingdom	The ship foundered off Drogheda, County Louth with the loss of all hands.
Helena	United Kingdom	The ship was driven ashore and wrecked at Ballywater, County Wexford with the loss of all hands.

== 19 December ==
List of shipwrecks: 19 December 1820
Ship	State	Description
Dublin Packet	United States	The ship was lost on the Kish Sandbank. She was on a voyage from New York to Dublin, United Kingdom.
Fame	United Kingdom	The ship was driven ashore at Devil's Point, Devon. She was on a voyage from the Charente to Plymouth, Devon. Fame was later refloated and taken in to Plymouth for repairs.
Isabella	United Kingdom	The ship was driven ashore and wrecked at Newry, County Antrim.
Rebecca	United Kingdom	The ship was wrecked at Cromane, County Kerry. Her crew were rescued. She was on a voyage from Oporto, Portugal to Dublin.

== 20 December ==
List of shipwrecks: 20 December 1820
Ship	State	Description
Anne	United Kingdom	The ship was driven ashore near Rosslare Harbour, County Wexford.
Betty	United Kingdom	The ship was driven ashore and wrecked at Drogheda, County Louth with the loss of all hands.
Retourde Portneral	France	The chasse-marée foundered in the English Channel off Portland, Dorset, United Kingdom.

== 21 December ==
List of shipwrecks: 21 December 1820
Ship	State	Description
Ceres	United Kingdom	The ship was driven ashore and severely damaged at Flamborough Head, Yorkshire. She was on a voyage from Stockton-on-Tees, Yorkshire to Rotterdam, South Holland, Netherlands. Ceres was later refloated and taken in to Bridlington, Yorkshire.

== 22 December ==
List of shipwrecks: 22 December 1820
Ship	State	Description
HMRC Grimbsy	Board of Customs	The cutter foundered in the Humber with the loss of all six crew.
Martha	United Kingdom	The brig ran aground on the Robin Rigg Sand and was wrecked. Her crew survived. She was on a voyage from Miramichi, New Brunswick, British North America to Glasgow, Renfrewshire. The wreck was plundered by the local inhabitants.
Soc Ormen	Norway	The brig foundered off "Carmoe". She was on a voyage from Amsterdam, North Holland, Netherlands to Trondheim.

== 23 December ==
List of shipwrecks: 23 December 1820
Ship	State	Description
Mary	United Kingdom	The sloop was driven ashore at Dungarvan, County Waterford and was abandoned by her crew. She was later refloated.
Orange	United Kingdom	The ship departed from Jamaica for London. No further trace, presumed foundered with the loss of all hands.
Squid	United Kingdom	The ship was driven ashore at Figueira da Foz, Portugal. She was refloated on 28 December.
Starling	United Kingdom	The ship departed from Saint John, New Brunswick, British North America for Glasgow, Renfrewshire. No further trace, presumed foundered with the loss of all hands.

== 24 December ==
List of shipwrecks: 24 December 1820
Ship	State	Description
Dee	United Kingdom	The ship was driven ashore and wrecked south of the Charleston Lighthouse, South Carolina, United States. Her crew were rescued. She was on a voyage from Liverpool to Charleston, South Carolina
Mary	United Kingdom	The ship was driven ashore and wrecked at Grangemouth, Stirlingshire. She was on a voyage from Alloa, Clackmannanshire to Glasgow, Renfrewshire.

== 25 December ==
List of shipwrecks: 25 December 1820
Ship	State	Description
Charlotte Augusta	Sweden	The ship was driven ashore and wrecked at Huttoft, Lincolnshire, United Kingdom. She was on a voyage from Stocvkholm to Guernsey, Channel Islands.
Hannah	United Kingdom	The ship was lost in the New Shetland Islands.
Margaret & Jane	United Kingdom	The ship sprang a leak and was beached at Bridlington, Yorkshire.
Neptune	United Kingdom	The ship was driven ashore and wrecked at "Dunlinton", Yorkshire.

== 26 December ==
List of shipwrecks: 26 December 1820
Ship	State	Description
Maria	United Kingdom	The ship departed from Cádiz, Spain for Havana, Cuba. No further trace, presumed foundered with the loss of all hands.
Oromocto	United Kingdom	The ship stopped at Maranham, Brazil, leaking badly. She was condemned on 1 February, not being worth the cost of repairs.
Saxony	Hamburg	The ship struck the Home Sand, in the North Sea and was consequently beached at Lowestoft, Suffolk, United Kingdom. She was on a voyage from Hamburg to London, United Kingdom. Saxony was refloated on 9 January 1821 and take in to Great Yarmouth, Norfolk for repairs.

== 27 December ==
List of shipwrecks: 27 December 1820
Ship	State	Description
Cumberland	United Kingdom	The ship departed from Bermuda for Bristol, Gloucestershire. No further trace, presumed foundered with the loss of all hands.
Friend's Desire	United Kingdom	The ship was run into by Hero (United Kingdom) and sunk at Mullion, Cornwall. Her crew were rescued.
HMRC Sprightly	Board of Customs	The cutter was driven ashore and wrecked at Portland, Dorset. Her crew were rescued by HMRC Greyhound and HMRC Scourge (both Board of Customs).
Stephane	France	The ship was wrecked on the Paternoster Rocks, in the English Channel off the Channel Islands. Her crew were rescued. She was on a voyage from Rotterdam, South Holland, Netherlands to Saint-Malo, Ille-et-Vilaine.

== 28 December ==
List of shipwrecks: 28 December 1820
Ship	State	Description
Caledonia	United Kingdom	The ship was driven ashore 10 nautical miles (19 km) south of Sandy Hook, New Jersey, United States and was wrecked the next day. Three people died. She was on a voyage from Liverpool, Lancashire to New York, United States.
Hope	United States	The ship was driven ashore and wrecked at the mouth of the River Boyne. Her thirteen crew were rescued. She was on a voyage from Savannah, Georgia to Liverpool.

== 29 December ==
List of shipwrecks: 29 December 1820
Ship	State	Description
Caledonia	United Kingdom	The ship was driven ashore and wrecked about 11 nautical miles (20 km) south of Sandy Hook, Georgia with the loss of three lives.
Duke of Cambridge	United Kingdom	The ship was wrecked in the English Channel off Broadstairs, Kent. Her crew were rescued. She was on a voyage from Bordeaux, Gironde, France to Hamburg.

== 30 December ==
List of shipwrecks: 30 December 1820
Ship	State	Description
Atlantic	United States	The ship was lost in the Crooked Island Passage, Bahamas. She was on a voyage from Jacmel, Haiti to Boston, Massachusetts.
Hanbury	United Kingdom	The ship was driven ashore and wrecked at Shoreham-by-Sea, Sussex. Her crew were rescued.
Hercules	United Kingdom	The ship ran aground on the Burbo Bank, in Liverpool Bay and was severely damaged. She was on a voyage from Liverpool, Lancashire to New York, United States. Hercules was later refloated and towed in to Liverpool.

== Unknown date ==
List of shipwrecks: Unknown date in December 1820
Ship	State	Description
Ann	United Kingdom	The full-rigged ship was lost in the New Shetland Islands. Her crew were rescued.
Clother	United States	The ship was lost in the New Shetlands Islands. Her crew were rescued.
Harriet	United Kingdom	The ship foundered in the Bristol Channel in late December.
Hercules	United Kingdom	The ship was wrecked near Alnwick, Northumberland. She was on a voyage from Rotterdam, South Holland, Netherlands to Montrose, Forfarshire.
Industry	Stolp	The ship was lost near Læsø, Denmark. Her crew were rescued. She was on a voyage from Brest, Finistère, France to Stolp.
Jonge Pieter Jacobus	Netherlands	The ship ran aground on the Moudersand. She was on a voyage from London, United Kingdom to Amsterdam, North Holland.
Kate	United Kingdom	The ship's crew mutinied and scuttled the vessel near "Deseada". She was on a voyage from Berbice to Halifax, Nova Scotia, British North America.
Lady Trowbridge	United Kingdom	The brig was lost in the New Shetland Islands. Her crew were rescued.
Ludwig Elise	Stettin	The ship was lost near Læsø before 7 December. Her crew were rescued. She was on a voyage from Leith, Lothian, United Kingdom to Stettin.
Marmion	United Kingdom	The ship was wrecked off Ramsgate, Kent at the end of December.
Martin	United Kingdom	The ship struck rocks off Maryport, Cumberland before 10 December. She was refloated but drove ashore at Annandale, Dumfriesshire the next day and was wrecked. Her crew survived but the ship was plundered by the local inhabitants.
Orange	United Kingdom	The ship departed from Jamaica for London at the end of December. No further trace, presumed foundered with the loss of all hands.
Partridge	United Kingdom	The ship was driven ashore near Madras, India. She was on a voyage from Bengal, India to London. Partridge was later refloated and put into Bombay for repairs.
Rodney	United Kingdom	The ship sprang a leak in the Atlantic Ocean and was abandoned by her crew. They were rescued by Mary (United Kingdom). Rodney was on a voyage from Miramichi Bay to Liverpool, Lancashire.
Two Brothers	United States	The ship was wrecked on Blanco Key. She was on a voyage from Charleston, South Carolina to Matanzas, Cuba.
