= Castle Forbes (1818 ship) =

Merchant ship

History

United Kingdom
- Name: Castle Forbes
- Owner: Robert Gibbon & Sons, Aberdeen
- Builder: Robert Gibbon & Sons, Aberdeen
- Launched: 1818
- Fate: Ceased sailing c.1832

General characteristics
- Tons burthen: 439, or 43948/94 or 440, or 443(bm)
- Length: 106 ft 6 in (32.5 m)
- Beam: 31 ft 0 in (9.4 m)
- Propulsion: Sail

Castle Forbes was a merchant ship built by Robert Gibbon & Sons at Aberdeen, Scotland in 1818. She was the first vessel built at Aberdeen for the trade with India. She then made several voyages to India, sailing under a license from the British East India Company (EIC). She made two voyages transporting convicts from Ireland to Australia. She sustained damage in 1826, on a voyage to India and was condemned at the Cape of Good Hope. However, she was repaired. She was last listed in 1832 (Register of Shipping), and in 1838 in Lloyd's Register (LR).

== Career ==
Castle Forbes entered LR in 1818, with J. Frazier, master, R. Gibbons, owner, and trade London–Bombay.

In 1813, the EIC had lost its monopoly on the trade between India and Britain. British ships were then free to sail to India or the Indian Ocean under a license from the EIC. Castle Forbes was the first vessel built in Aberdeen for the trade with India. On 17 May 1818, Captain J. Frazier sailed from London bound for Bombay, sailing under a license from the EIC.

1st convict voyage (1819–1820): Castle Forbes was under the command of Thomas Reid and surgeon J. Scott, when she departed Cork, Ireland on 3 October 1819. She arrived in Sydney on 27 January 1820. She had left with 140 convicts and there were no convict deaths en route. She landed four at Sydney. Castle Forbes departed Port Jackson on 15 February 1820, for Hobart Town with 180 male convicts. She arrived in Hobart Town on 29 February 1820. Castle Forbes left Hobart Town on 26 March 1820, bound for Batavia.

On 8 May 1821, Castle Forbes, Reed, master, grounded three times on the Goodwin south sand head, damaging her rudder. Two Deal boats took her into The Downs. She been sailing from London to Bombay.

In 1821, Castle Forbes's master was Orde, but her owner was still Gibbons & Co.

Between this convict voyage and the next, Castle Forbes sailed between England and Van Diemen's Land.

2nd convict voyage (1823–1824): Castle Forbes sailed from Cork on 28 September 1823; she was under the command of John Ord (or Orde) and surgeon Matthew Anderson. She arrived in Sydney on 15 January 1824. She had embarked 140 male convicts and had one convict death en route. Castle Forbes left Port Jackson on 11 March 1824 bound for Isle de France.

From Mauritius Castle Forbes sailed to Madras. On 19 July, she arrived at Bengal. On 7 November, she sailed from Bengal for Mauritius and London. she arrived at Deal on 7 June 1825.

On 28 October 1825, Castle Forbes, Ord, master, came into Portsmouth leaky. She was going to remove part of her cargo to try to discover the source and repair it before continuing on her way to Madras and Bengal. By 19 December, her repairs were complete but she was still taking in so much water it was expected that she would again have to be unloaded. One week later she had completed her repairs and she sailed out to the Motherbank where she awaited a wind in order to resume her voyage.

Also on 19 December, Brailsford came into Cork due to the extraordinary exertions of here master and mariners. Her crew had been living in the vessel''s roundhouse and were short of water and provisions before Castle Forbes and Malay came by and assisted her.

On 14 January 1826 Castle Forbes arrived at Madeira from London. On 2 February she sailed for Madras and Bengal.

Castle Forbes was sailing from London and Madeira to Madras when she had to put in at the Cape of Good Hope on 15 April 1826. Her main, mizzen, and foretop masts had been sprung. She had to discharge to repair. The next report was that she was discharging her cargo into Coventry, Purdy, master, and was expected to be found unworthy of repair. She was then surveyed; she was condemned and reportedly sold for breaking up.

However, Castle Forbes was repaired. On 3 June, Coventry, Purvis, master, was waiting for Castle Forbes to be heave down to be repaired. On 4 October 1826 Captain Ord sailed from the Cape, bound for Bombay. Castle Forbes arrived at Madras on 4 December, and was expected to sail to Bengal on the 12th.

The next press mention of Castle Forbes was that Castle Forbes, Beveridge, master, had returned to Deal on 29 November 1827, from Trieste.

== Fate ==
Castle Forbes was last listed in the Register of Shipping in 1832. She was still listed from 1834 to 1838 in LR, but with minimal data.
