= Kenn Plateau =

The Kenn Plateau is a large piece of submerged continental crust off northeastern Australia that rifted from northeastern Australia about 63-52 mya, along with other nearby parts of the Zealandia continent.
