= PS Rob Roy =

Ship

History

United Kingdom
- Name: Rob Roy
- Owner: David Napier
- Builder: William Denny, Dumbarton
- Launched: 1818
- Fate: Seized by French customs

History

France
- Name: Henri Quatre
- Owner: Imperial French Navy
- Operator: La Poste

General characteristics
- Tonnage: 87 tons
- Length: 80 ft (24 m) LOA
- Beam: 16 ft (4.9 m)
- Draft: Max. 5 ft 9 in (1.75 m)
- Installed power: 30 HP

The Rob Roy was the first steamship to successfully sail the open sea. The ship was named after the Scottish folk hero Rob Roy MacGregor.

== History ==
The paddle steamer was built by William Denny from Dumbarton and equipped with a 30 HP side-balancing steam engine by David Napier. On the morning of 13 June 1818 the Rob Roy left the port of Greenock, sailed via Campbeltown and reached Belfast on the evening of 14 June 1818. She then plied this route twice a week in all weathers, including those in which sailing ships stayed in port. The ship later operated on the route between Greenock and Dublin. In the winter of 1818/9 the steamship was overhauled and equipped with separate rooms for women and men with beds. From 1818 to 1821 David Tod was Rob Roy's chief engineer.

In May 1821 the ship was transferred to Dover and reached its new homeport on Sunday 10 June 1821. On 15 June 1821 the Rob Roy crossed the English Channel for the first time and reached Calais. In the beginning, there were only a few passengers and the post office favoured conventional sailing ships. But soon the advantages of the steamship were recognized, as it travelled regardless of the weather and only needed 2 hours and 45 minutes for the crossing, which began to be reflected in a growing number of passengers and volume of freight. In August 1821, the Roy Rob met the oncoming sailing ships Lord Duncan and Prince Leopold on the way to Calais. She cleared her goods in Calais, took on new passengers and overtook the two ships on the way back.

The successful use of the Roy Rob led to traditional parcel ships being replaced by steamers on many routes in a very short time. For the connection between Dover and Calais, the steamship Dasher was introduced in October 1821 and the Arrow in January 1822. The French government was interested in acquiring the Rob Roy, but a British export ban on machinery prevented the ship's owners from selling. However, French customs officers found contraband on board the ship and confiscated it. It was suspected that this was just a trick agreed with the shipowners to circumvent the export ban. The ship was renamed to Henri Quatre or Henry IV in 1823 and continued sailing between Calais and Dover. It was France's first seaworthy steamship.
