= Felicitas (1818 ship) =

History

United Kingdom
- Name: Felicitas
- Builder: James Macrae, Chittagong
- Launched: 1818
- Fate: Wrecked 5 December 1827

General characteristics
- Tons burthen: 39535/94, or 400, or 425 (bm)
- Length: 105 ft 3 in (32.1 m)
- Beam: 29 ft 11 in (9.12 m)

Felicitas was a merchantman, trading in the Indian Ocean. She was launched at Chittagong in 1818. She was registered at Calcutta and made one voyage to Great Britain. She was wrecked at Madras in December 1827.

== Career ==
In 1813 the East India Company had lost its monopoly on the trade between India and Britain, and private British ships were then free to sail between India or the Indian Ocean and Great Britain under a license from the EIC.

In 1819 her master was J.A.de Coil and her managing owner was Cruttenden & Co.

On 26 October 1823, with P Campbell now master, Felicitas sailed from Bengal for Mauritius and Gibraltar. On 14 December she was at Mauritius and on 5 March 1824 she was at Saint Helena. She sailed for London on 9 March, arriving at Portsmouth on 8 June, and departing for London on the 10th. She arrived at Gravesend on 14 June.

In 1824 P.Campbell was her master and managing owner.

On 9 September Felicitas, began the return voyage from London for Calcutta. She arrived at Bengal on 9 February 1825. On 10 March she sailed for Madras and Bencoolen. On 29 March she sailed from Madras to Penang.

In 1827 her master was P. Campbell, and Alexander & Co. were her managing owners.

== Loss ==
On 5 December 1827 a gale or hurricane drove Felicitas ashore at Madras and she became a total loss. Felicitas was wrecked about seven miles south of Covelong. Several other British ships were lost at the same time. The masters were all ashore at the time and casualties among their crews were few.
