= Brailsford (1811 ship) =

History

United Kingdom
- Name: Brailsford
- Namesake: Brailsford
- Builder: Kingston upon Hull
- Launched: 1811
- Fate: Wrecked 19 April 1831

General characteristics
- Tons burthen: 466 (bm)

Brailsford was launched at Kingston upon Hull in 1811. She traded widely, including making several voyages to India under a license from the British East India Company (EIC). She suffered mishaps in 1823 and 1826 and was finally wrecked on 19 April 1831.

== Career ==
Brailsford first appeared in Lloyd's Register (LR) in 1815.

Year	Master	Owner	Trade	Source & notes
1815	A.Wood	A.Wood	Cork–Liverpool	LR
1816	A.Wood; W.Robb	Capt.&Co. J.Smith	Cork–Liverpool	LR

In 1817–1818 Brailsford sailed to the West indies and as a transport.

Year	Master	Owner	Trade	Source & notes
1818	Springer	Baker & Co.	London–India	LR
1819	Springer	Baker & Co.	London–India; London–Quebec	LR; repairs 1819

On 22 April 1819 Brailsford, [John] Spring, master, sailed from Gravesend, bound for Quebec. She arrived there on 9 June with 16 passengers and was back at Deal on 31 August. On 12 November she sailed from Gravesend for Sierra Leone. Brailsford arrived there on 2 December.

In 1813 the EIC had lost its monopoly on the trade between India and Britain. British ships were then free to sail to India or the Indian Ocean under a license from the EIC.

On 29 August 1820 Captain Springer sailed from London, bound for Bombay. On 18 September Brailsford arrived at Madeira and on 19 November she arrived at the Cape; she sailed for Bombay on the 25th. She sailed from Bombay on 12 April 1821 and the Cape on 18 July, arriving at Deal on 25 September and Gravesend on the 28th.

On 16 October 1821 she sailed from Plymouth for London.

On 3 January 1822 Captain Springer arrived at Deal from London, bound for Bombay. She arrived at Madeira on 13 January 1822 and sailed for Bombay on the 22nd. She arrived at Bombay on 26 May. She sailed from Bombay on 22 July and the Cape on 25 September, arriving at Gravesend on 26 November.

On 13 April 1823 Brailsford, Spring, master, sailed for Bombay. In May she sailed from Madeira and arrived at Bombay prior to 4 September.

Year	Master	Owner	Trade	Source & notes
1824	J.Springer; J.Newton	Springer & Co. T.Pope	London–Bombay; Plymouth–Montreal	LR; small repairs 1819

On 22 November 1823 came into the Cape of Good Hope leaky. She had run into bad weather in Algoa Bay and was making 13 inches of water per hour. It was expected that she would have to unload her cargo to deal with the leak. By 14 February 1824 she had completed her repairs and reloaded her cargo. She was expected to sail for London in a few days. Brailsford arrived back at Gravesend on 1 May.

Year	Master	Owner	Trade	Source & notes
1825	J.Newton	T.Pope	Plymouth–Montreal	LR; small repairs 1819

In September or October 1824 Brailsford, Sanderson, master was in the Miramichi River. On 3 January 1825 she arrived at Plymouth from Ramshag, Nova Scotia.

On 5 June 1825 she arrived at Miramichi from Weymouth. On 7 July she arrived back at Plymouth from Miramichi.

Trident found Brailsford on 17 December at 51°20′N 8°00′W. Brailsford had been waterlogged for 35 days. Trident supplied her with necessities; Brailsford was expected at Cork. On 19 January 1826 Brailsford came into Cork due to the extraordinary exertions of here master and mariners. Her crew had been living in the vessel''s roundhouse and were short of water and provisions before Castle Forbes and Malay came by and assisted her. On 30 December Archimedes encountered a waterlogged Brailsford at 47°N 14°W. Brailsford was reported to have come from Saint John, New Brunswick. Brailsford, Wilson, master, bound for Falmouth, arrived at the Cove of Cork leaky and having thrown part of her cargo overboard.

On 25 April Brailsford, Moon, master, came into Plymouth in a very leaky state. She had been on a voyage from Cork to Saint John, New Brunswick, with 300 passengers. On 3 September she returned to Plymouth from New Brunswick.

Year	Master	Owner	Trade	Source & notes
1827	F.Moon	T.Pope	Cork–Quebec	LR; large repair 1825
1831	S.Cleverley	T.Pope	Plymouth–Sierra Leone	LR; large repair 1825

== Fate ==
On 19 April 1831 Brailsford, Cleverely, master, struck on Langley Island as Brailsford was sailing from Plymouth to Quebec. Her crew abandoned her on 24 April after securing her sails and rigging. However, a gale sprang up and afterwards the wreck had disappeared; it was believed that she had sunk.
