= William Shand (1818 ship) =

History
- Name: William Shand
- Owner: Lumsden & Co.; William Boswell (from 1836)
- Builder: Monkwearmouth Shipyard, Sunderland, United Kingdom
- Launched: 1818
- Fate: Wrecked, Sīkrags, Courland Governorate in 1842.

General characteristics
- Class & type: Barque
- Tons burthen: 284 (bm)
- Propulsion: Sail
- Notes: Logbook pages discovered at the National Herbarium of Victoria; delivered news of Tasmania’s independence

The William Shand was a merchant ship built in 1818 at Monkwearmouth, Sunderland in the United Kingdom. The name William Shand cannot be tied with certainty to one individual but ship naming convention at the time suggests William Shand may have been a shipowner, merchant, or an investor, possibly involved in trade between Britain and Australia.

She was a wooden sailing vessel known as a barque, a type common in the eighteenth and nineteenth centuries, typically having three or more masts and widely used for long-distance trade and voyages. Made predominantly of English Oak she measured a length of 91.6 feet (just over 28 metres), registered 235 tons of net capacity and weighed a total of 285 tons. There are no known images of the William Shand, but James Cook’s Endeavour was of similar size and design and serves as a comparison.

Commanded by Captain Alexander Kenn, and owned by Lumsdon & Co., London, the William Shand regularly sailed between England, Hobart and Port Jackson, now known as Sydney Harbour. A ship’s arrival was a significant event for the settlers, eagerly anticipated and reported in local newspapers. These accounts allow us to trace her movements and highlight the vital role she played in connecting the colonies with Britain.

News reports from both the Hobart Town Gazette and Van Diemen’s Advertiser and the Sydney Gazette and New South Wales Advertiser indicate on these voyages she transported passengers, livestock for sale, delivered news from London, and essential supplies to the colonies, returning to the UK with Australian exports, such as cedar oil.

In August 1822, the local papers reported the William Shand arriving in Hobart on the 19th August after leaving England on the 1st May, a direct voyage totaling 3 months and eighteen days, giving an indication of the typical duration of the passage from London to Hobart of a nineteenth century barque.

Almost three years later, in July 1825, the William Shand is again reported to be back in Hobart at the end of June after leaving England on the 12th of March. This report is particularly significant because the William Shand brings news to Tasmania of its independence.

She brings a (sic) mail, and the important news that Tasmania is now independent of the elder Colony. This information is furnished to us in a letter from Mr. Wilkinson, a respectable merchant in London, to the house Of Kemp and Co. in Hobart Town; of which the following is an Extract:-- “Your Colony is now made independent of New South Wales; and your Governor will in consequence get a large increase of income --- Many new appointments will follow”

There are brief references in both the Sydney and Hobart newspapers to the William Shand calling at ports outside Australian waters, including Singapore, Saint Jago (Island of Santiago in the Cape Verde Islands) and Penang These accounts, however, are limited in detail, and the broader record of the vessel’s voyages remains incomplete.

== Discovery at the National Herbarium of Victoria ==
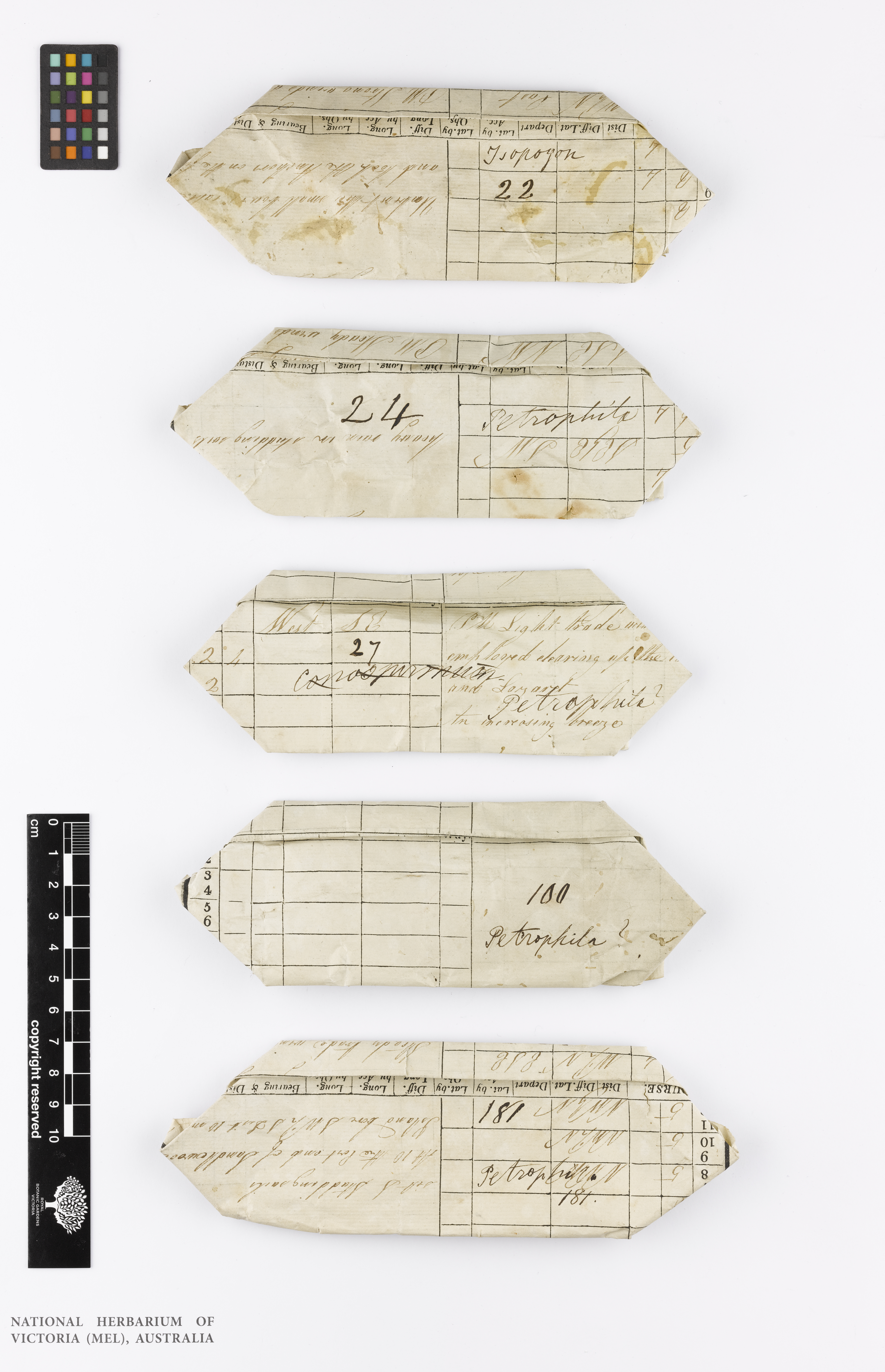
Log book pages from the William Shand (1818), converted for use as seed packets.

The National Herbarium of Victoria is not typically associated with maritime artefacts. In November 2025, however, a member of the curation staff sorting a container of nineteenth century seed collections for accession, made a significant discovery.

As was standard practice in the nineteenth century, seeds were stored in hand folded paper packets. Botanists employed a distinctive folding method designed to secure and protect the contents, and, due to the scarcity of paper at the time, these packets were commonly made from recycled documents. It is not unusual for curation staff to find historic botanical specimens wrapped in paper repurposed from journals, illustrations, sheet music, or correspondence. In this instance, the packets were constructed from pages of the William Shand’s logbook.

The five packets contain seeds from Petrophile and Isopogon, both members of the family Proteaceae. The two principal botanists active during this period were Allan Cunningham and Charles Fraser. While the numbering on the packets appears more consistent with Cunningham’s system, the absence of additional collection details means their provenance cannot be confirmed. At present, the seeds have not been identified to species level. Once identification is complete, it may be possible to associate them with the regions where those species occur, providing further clues about the likely collector.

== The logbook ==
No one can be certain how Allan Cunningham or Charles Fraser may have come across pages from the William Shand’s logbook, there is no record of either man travelling on the vessel. However, before the Mercantile Marine Act of 1850, British merchant ships were not under a statutory obligation to keep an official logbook.

It is therefore possible that, once a log had served its immediate administrative purpose and the ship’s accounts were settled, it was not retained and may have been discarded as routine paperwork at the port’s shipping office, the pages to be recovered later for use as seed packets.

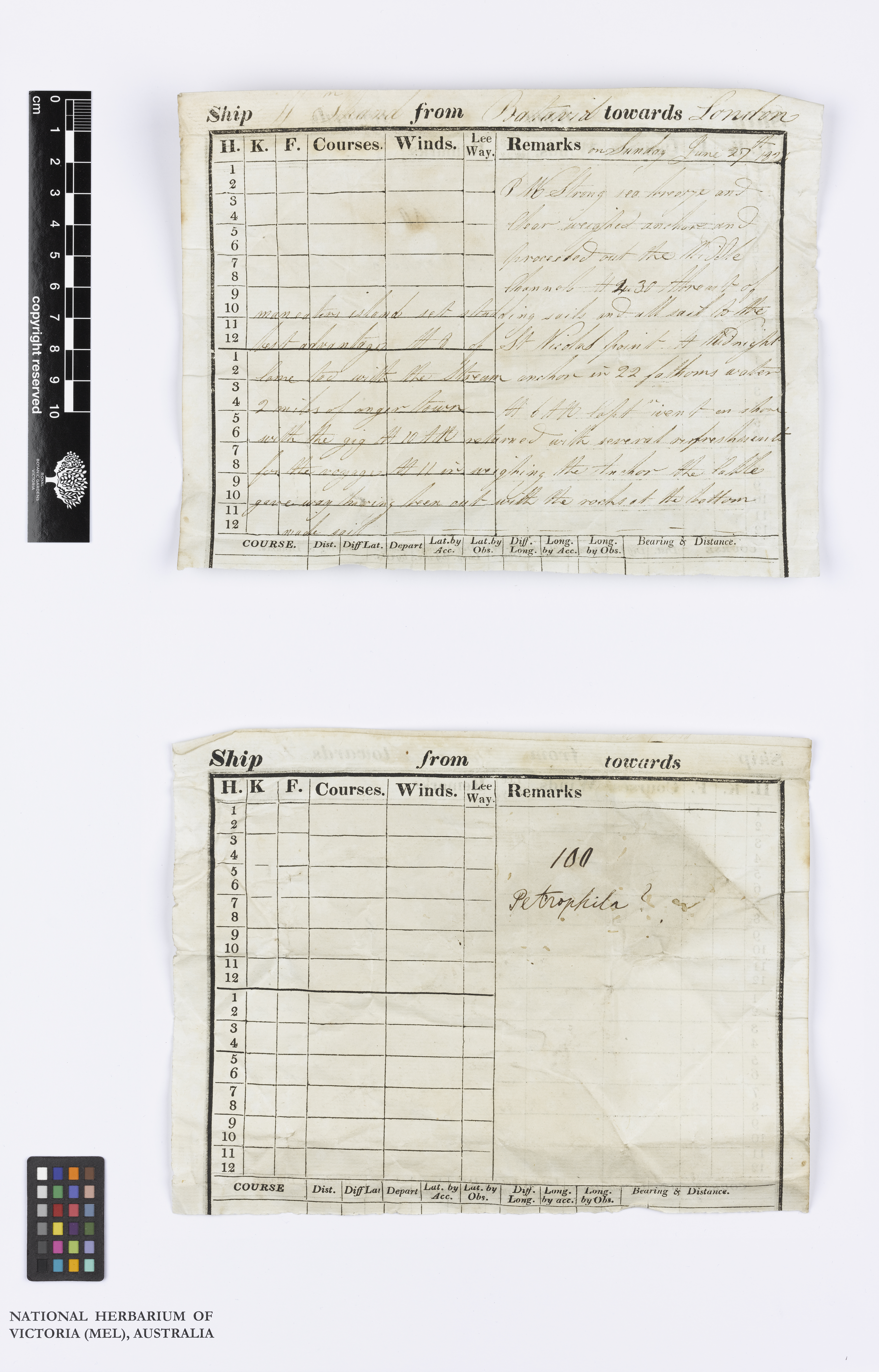
William Shand logbook page dated June 27, 1824, outlining the voyage through the Indonesian Islands.

The surviving records consist of five half pages with nine handwritten logbook entries from the William Shand, dating from Wednesday, October 22, 1823 to Sunday, 27 June, 1824. Two of the pages bear an 1822 watermark, consistent with the vessel's period of operation. These logbook entries provide a window into life aboard an early 19th-century ship, detailing navigation routines and coordinates, weather observations, sailing procedures, and routine maintenance such as painting the vessel’s exterior, cleaning portholes, and maintaining the lazaret, a designated quarantine area.

== 1823-1824 voyage ==
The newly discovered log entries, in conjunction with existing reports, allow a partial route to be plotted of the 1823-1824 voyage.

The William Shand is documented as departing London on 20 October, 1823 and reaching Hobart on 4 February 1824. The earliest surviving logbook entries dated October, 22 and 24 and December 17 and 19, 1823, indicate the vessel sailed from London through the English Channel and across the Bay of Biscay en route to the Mediterranean and, by mid December was recorded in the waters off the western Turkish coast, navigating among the islands and approaches of the Aegean sea, before eventually reaching Hobart. After a brief stay in port, she sailed for Port Jackson (Sydney Harbour) in late February.

From Port Jackson, the vessel departed on 30 March and proceeded north toward Batavia (Jakarta). On the 3rd April, the William Shand came across a large, coral seamount reef system approximately 680 km E, of what is now, the coastal town of Mackay, in the Coral Sea, (21° 9’ S 155° 49 E.) This sighting served as the first documented record of the site in the India Directory, which was subsequently named Kenn Reef, in honour of the ship's commander, Captain Alexander Kenn. This is the last report, prior to the discovery of the logbook pages, of the William Shand during her 1823-1824 voyage.

From this point onward, the vessel’s movements are again traced through the logbook entries. By 2 May the ship had entered the Indonesian archipelago, passing Semoa (Pulau Semau) and Sandalwood Island (Pulau Sumba), and on 4 May she was navigating through the Straits of Allas (Alas Strait).

After departing Batavia for London in late June, the ship navigated the "Middle Channels" of the Thousand Islands (Kepulauan Seribu), passing Maneaters Island (Pulau Laki) and St. Nicholas Point (Tanjung Pujut). On 27 June, the vessel arrived at Anger town (Anyer) where the captain went ashore for refreshments; however, during the subsequent departure, the anchor cable was severed by a rocky bottom, resulting in the possible loss of an anchor. This is the final entry on the surviving logbook pages.

Having spent nearly fifteen and a half months in transit, the William Shand concluded its voyage in London in early 1825, refitting in time for a March 12 departure back to the colonies. There are no recorded voyages of the William Shand travelling this route after 1827.

== Sale of the William Shand ==
On 5 January 1827, a Sydney newspaper reported the sale of the William Shand and noted that Captain Kenn had taken command of another ship. This evidence suggests that the William Shand underwent a change of commander in the late months of 1826, when the ship was sold and Captain Kenn left the vessel to take command of the newly built brig, the Lion. Neither the purchaser nor the identity of the captain who succeeded Kenn after on the William Shand, after the 1827 sale, has been established.

On the 2nd December 1836, the 18-year-old William Shand was documented as being owned William Boswell, most likely a merchant or ship-owner and captained by Thomas Davidson. The vessel was registered in North Shields, a major coal-exporting centre on the River Tyne in the north of England, just 12 km north of Sunderland, where she was built. Under Boswell’s ownership the ship was most likely employed carrying coal outbound on Tyne-Baltic routes.

== Death of Captain Alexander Kenn ==
Captain Kenn died in January 1829 his death notice as follows: DIED — On Sunday last, Jan. 11, universally respected, at Launceston, (where he had only for a short time opened a mercantile house, in connection with Buckles, Bagster, and Buchanan, of London) Captain Alexander Kenn, late owner and commander of the brig Lion and ship William Shand.

== Fate of the William Shand ==
The ship’s last recorded event was in 1842, while still under the Shields registry. On the 6 September, the William Shand was reported as being: “driven ashore on the Sickragger three leagues west of Domesnes (Cape Kolka), Latvia. On a voyage from the Tyne towards St. Petersburg”. The Sickragger referring to the coast off the village of Sīkrags, Courland Governorate (57° 39’ 41” N 22° 13’ 21” E).
