= HMS Sprightly (1818) =

Cutter of the Royal Navy

History

United Kingdom
- Name: Sprightly
- Ordered: 1817
- Builder: Pembroke Dockyard
- Laid down: October 1817
- Launched: 3 June 1818
- Completed: 18 January 1820
- Fate: Wrecked, 27 December 1820

General characteristics
- Class & type: Nightingale-class cutter
- Tons burthen: 140 bm
- Length: 67 ft (20.4 m) (gundeck); 52 ft 7 in (16.0 m) (keel)
- Beam: 22 ft 5 in (6.8 m)
- Draught: 10 ft 5 in (3.2 m)
- Depth: 9 ft 6 in (2.9 m)
- Sail plan: Fore-and-aft rig
- Complement: 34
- Armament: 2 × 6-pdr cannon; 4 × 6-pdr carronades

HMS Sprightly was a 6-gun Nightingale-class cutter built for the Royal Navy during the 1810s. She was wrecked off the Isle of Portland in 1821.

== Description ==
Sprightly had a length at the gundeck of 67 feet (20.4 m) and 52 feet 7 inches (16.0 m) at the keel. She had a beam of 22 feet 5 inches (6.8 m), a draught of about 10 feet 5 inches (3.2 m) and a depth of hold of 9 feet 6 inches (2.9 m). The ship's tonnage was 140 tons burthen. The Nightingale class was armed with two 6-pounder cannon and four 6-pounder carronades. The ships had a crew of 34 officers and ratings.

== Construction and career ==
Sprightly, the fourth ship of her name to serve in the Royal Navy, was ordered in 1817, laid down in October 1817 at Pembroke Dockyard, Wales, and launched on 3 June 1818. She was transferred to the Revenue Service in 1819 and completed on 18 January 1820 at Plymouth Dockyard. She was driven ashore and wrecked at Portland, Dorset on 27 December 1820. Her crew were rescued by HMRC Greyhound and HMRC Scourge.
