= Lady Ridley (1813 ship) =

History

United Kingdom
- Name: Lady Ridley
- Builder: William Stoveld, Blyth
- Launched: 10 December 1813
- Fate: Wrecked 11 November 1831

General characteristics
- Tons burthen: 373, or 37932/94, or 393 (bm)

Lady Ridley was launched in 1813 at Blyth as a West Indiaman. She transported convicts in 1821 to Van Diemen's Land. She also sailed to India under a license from the British East India Company (EIC). She was wrecked on 11 November 1831.

== Career ==
Lady Ridley first appeared in Lloyd's Register (LR) in 1814 with P.Inglis, master, Inglis & Co., owners, and tade London-Grenada.

Year	Master	Owner	Trade	Source & notes
1815	P.Inglis; J.Dyson; Anderson	Inglis & Co.	London–Grenada	LR
1816	Anderson	Wassak & Co	Liverpool–Madeira	LR
1820	Boydel; R.Vare	Robertson	London–St John; London–Botany Bay	LR

In July 1818 Lady Ridley was returning to England from Jamaica when she had to put into Havana leaky. She was repaired and left on 27 July.

A gale at Saint John, New Brunswick, drove Lady Ridley ashore on 21 December 1819 and damaged her. Once she had been refloated, she sailed to Jamaica.

Convict transport: Captain Robert Weir sailed Lady Ridley from England on 4 June 1821. She sailed via Rio de Janeiro and arrived at Hobart on 27 June. She had embarked 138 male convicts and she disembarked 137. On 25 July she arrived at Sydney. She returned to England via Batavia. On 15 April 1822 she arrived at Cape of Good Hope from Batavia. She had put in to fix a trivial leak. She was surveyed and the carpenters put to work. She sailed for England on the 20th. However, she sailed on to Helvoet and Rotterdam. She arrived at Gravesend on 25 September.

Year	Master	Owner	Trade	Source & notes
1825	W.Scott	Captain & Co.	Plymouth	LR
1830	W.Scott	Martin & Co.	Dublin–Quebec	LR; small repairs 1827

On 13 May 1831 Doris sprang a leak, forcing her crew to abandon her in the Atlantic Ocean. Lady Ridley rescued the crew.

== Fate ==
On 11 November 1831 Lady Ridley was driven ashore and wrecked at Bailey's Mistake, Newfoundland. Her eighteen crew were rescued.
