= Malay (1818 ship) =

History

United Kingdom
- Name: Malay
- Builder: John Scott & Sons, Greenock
- Launched: 3 September 1818
- Fate: Wrecked 1 November 1831

General characteristics
- Tons burthen: 215 (bm)
- Length: 87 ft 2 in (26.6 m)
- Beam: 23 ft 10 in (7.3 m)

Malay was launched in Greenock in 1818. She sailed between Greenock and either North America or the West Indies. In particular, in 1830, she brought immigrants from Scotland to what is now Canada. She was wrecked in November 1831.

== Career ==
Malay first appeared in Lloyd's Register (LR) in 1818.

At 3am on 23 May 1819 a fire broke out on Malay as she had begun a voyage from Greenock to Jamaica, but her crew was able to work her into the Greenock Roads. Within three hours they were able to put out the fire, which had run along the deck. The water used to put out the fire badly damaged her cargo.

Year	Master	Owner	Trade	Source & notes
1818	Young	R[oger] Sinclair	Greenock–Saint Johns	LR
1820	Young; Montlemore	R.Sinclair	Greenock–Jamaica	LR
1824	D[avid] Neill	Clothers	Greenock–Jamaica	LR
1828	D.Neill	J.Neill & Co.	Greenock–Demerara	LR
1831	Coverdale	J.Laing	Greenock-Quebec	LR; good repair 1830

In January 1826 Malay was able to provide assistance to Brailsford, which had become waterlogged while sailing from Quebec to Cork.

In 1830, Malay brought 261 settlers to Canada from Tobermory. She had left Tobermory on 20 July. On 28 August she delivered 211 to Sydney, Nova Scotia; then on 10 September she reached Quebec City, where she delivered 50 more.

The immigrants included 49 families, comprising some 200 people, from Skye. The landed at Margeree on Cape Breton Island, and settled deep in the interior, founding Skye Glen. Each immigrant received a grant of 100 acres of land, "free of charges other than the usual fees". The group's leader, Alexander Beaton, received 300 acres. The Halifax Council later awarded each family a grant of $100 from the "King's Casual Revenue".

In January 1831, Malay, Coverdale, master, sailed from Greenock, bound for St Thomas and Trinidad.

== Fate ==
Malay was lost on 1 November 1831 on Basque Island (45.580°N 60.650°W), "below Green Island". She was on a voyage from Liverpool to Quebec City. Her crew was saved. Her whole cargo was expected to be saved, but in a very damaged state.
