= Alfred (1818 ship) =

History

United Kingdom
- Name: Alfred
- Owner: Various
- Builder: James Macrae, Chittagong,
- Launched: 1818
- Renamed: Deutschland (1845)
- Fate: Last listed 1857

General characteristics
- Tons burthen: 681, or 716, or 71632/94,< (bm)
- Length: 136 ft 3 in (41.5 m) (keel)
- Beam: 35 ft 2 in (10.7 m)
- Propulsion: Sail
- Notes: Teak-built

Alfred was launched at Chittagong in 1818 and in 1820 her owners transferred her registry to Great Britain. She then traded around India and between Britain and India under a license from the EIC. Between 1827 and 1828 made a voyage to China for the British East India Company (EIC) as an "extra ship", i.e., under charter. In 1845 she was condemned but new owners restored her and named her Deutschland. She was last listed in 1857.

== Career ==
Alfred first appears in Lloyd's Register in 1820. Her master is Wilkerson, her owner is Alexander, and her trade is London—India.

Year	Master	Owner	Trade
1821	Wilkerson	Alexander	London—India
1822	Wilkerson	Alexander	London—India
1823	Wilkerson	Alexander	London—India
1824	Wilkerson	Alexander	London—India
1825	Lamb	Liebing & Co.	London—Bombay
1826	Lamb	Liebing & Co.	London—Bombay
1827	Lamb; Pearson	Liebing & Co.	London—Bombay
1828	Pearson	Liebing & Co.	London—India
1829	Pearson; Hill	Liebing & J. Flint	London—India
1830	Hill; Flint	J. Flint	London—Madras

What the above table, drawn from various issues of Lloyd's Register, hides is that between 1827 and 1828 she made a voyage to China under charter to the EIC. At the time her principal managing owners were Fraser, Living & Co. Captain John Pearson sailed from the Downs on 16 April 1827 and arrived at Whampoa Anchorage on 10 August. Homeward bound, she left Whampoa on 10 October, reached Saint Helena on 28 December, and arrived at Blackwall on 20 February 1828. The EIC had chartered her for £13 17s 6d per ton.

After her sale to Flint, she was converted to a barque.

On 6 May 1845, Alfred was condemned at Valparaiso as unseaworthy. However, Roepingh, of Hamburg, purchased and refitted her, renaming her Deutschland.

Year	Master	Owner	Trade	Source
1846	Brett	Flint & Co.		Lloyd's Register (1846)
1847				Not listed in Lloyd's Register (1847)

== Fate ==
No longer listed after 1857.
