= British transport vessels for the Persian Gulf campaign of 1819 =

In 1819 the British government of India decided to mount an expedition to Ras Al Khaimah to suppress piracy in the Persian Gulf.

A British memo of 1819 stated:

The piratical enterprises of the Joasmi [Al Qasimi] tribes and other Arab tribes in the Persian Gulf region had become so extensive and attended by so many atrocities on peaceful traders, that the Government of India at last determined that an expedition on a much larger and comprehensive scale than ever done before, should be undertaken for the destruction of the maritime force of these piratical tribes on the Gulf and that a new policy of bringing the tribes under British rule should be inaugurated.

For the expedition the government engaged a number of merchant vessels to transport troops and ordnance stores.

Name	Burthen (bm)	When and where built	Notes
Angelica	300	1808† / 1818‡; Demaun	Later sold to the Portuguese‡
Ann			See ship article
Bombay Castle	571‡ / 580†	1815† / 1816‡; Cochin	Still sailing out of Bombay in 1838‡
Carron	451† / 484‡	1817; Cochin	Sailing out of Bombay in 1838‡
Conde de Rio Pardo	430	1816;† Demaun	Sailing out of Bombay in 1823 under the name King George the Fourth‡
Cornwall			See ship article
Diana	500†	1818†; Cochin†	Wrecked June 1820 off the coast of Muscat
Ernaad	550 / 557 / 594	Bombay 1813 / Demaun 1814	Timber ship built for the British East India Company (EIC), sold at public auction and sailing out of Calcutta in 1839.
Faiz Remaun			
Francis Warden	410† / 419‡	1810† Beypoor / 1803‡ Beypour	Launched as Duncan; sailing out of Bombay in 1837‡
Glenelg	810† / 867‡	1817 Cochin	Sailing out of Bombay 1838‡
Hannah			See ship article
Jemima	460‡	1817‡ Chittagong‡	Later called Mahomed Shah; foundered at the Sand Heads September 1822‡
Jessy	338	1814‡ Cochin	
Orient			See ship article
Orpheus			See ship article
Pascoa			See ship article
Upton Castle	596	1818 Cochin	Still sailing out of Bombay 1839

†:Register; ‡: Phipps; no mark when both agree

Following the surrender of Ras Al Khaimah and Dhayah Fort, the British expeditionary force then blew up the buildings comprising the town of Ras Al Khaimah and established a garrison there of 800 sepoys and artillery, before visiting Jazirat Al Hamra, which was found to be deserted. They went on to destroy the fortifications and larger vessels of Umm Al Qawain, Ajman, Fasht, Sharjah, Abu Hail, and Dubai. Ten vessels that had taken shelter in Bahrain were also destroyed. The Royal Navy suffered no casualties during the action.
