= Hannah (1811 ship) =

United Kingdom
- Name: Hannah
- Owner: 1811:Bruce, Fawcett & Co.; 1814:Buxton & Co.; 1820:Heathorn; 1825:Forbes & Co.
- Builder: Bombay Dockyard
- Launched: 4 September 1811
- Fate: Last listed 1833

General characteristics
- Tons burthen: 457, or 466, or 46659/94, or 492 (bm)
- Length: 114 ft 7 in (34.9 m)
- Beam: 31 ft 1 in (9.5 m)
- Complement: Three officers and 30 European seamen
- Armament: 1814:2 × 9-pounder guns + 10 × 18-pounder carronades; 1820:6 guns
- Notes: Teak-built; two decks

Hannah was launched at Bombay Dockyard in 1811. Shortly after she was launched, she sailed to England on a voyage for the British East India Company (EIC), where her owners sold her to British owners. She engaged in a single-ship action in 1814 in which she repelled an American privateer. She participated as a transport in a punitive expedition in 1819-1820 to Ras al-Khaimah in the Persian Gulf. She was last listed in 1833.

== Career ==
Captain William Denniston sailed Hannah from Bombay to London. She left Bombay on 11 March 1813, was at Point de Galle on 30 March, reached St Helena on 9 June, and arrived at The Downs on 11 August.

Hannah was admitted to the Registry of Great Britain on 16 September 1813. She first appears in Lloyd's Register in 1813 with M'Quaker, master, Buxton & Co., owner, and trade London–Bombay.

A letter from Bombay dated 16 June 1814 reported that the day before Hannah, M'Quaker, master, had arrived there. She reported that when she was in latitude 39°S and a little east of the Cape of Good Hope she had encountered an American privateer of 22 guns. After an engagement lasting three-and-a-half hours, Hannah repulsed the American ship. A fuller account appeared in American papers. The action took place on 14 March 1814 at 39°15′S 20°41′W and the American vessel was the privateer Jacob Jones, of Boston, J. Roberts, master. According to the papers she was armed with sixteen 12 and 9-pounder guns, and had a crew of about 70 men. (Note: There exists a report that Jacob Jones was of 555 tons (bm; American), and sailed with 20 guns and 127 men.) The American report stated that Jacob Jones would have continued the action if she had not run out of ammunition. Casualties aboard Hannah amounted to one man killed and two wounded, one severely.

Hannah, McQuaker, arrived at Portsmouth from Bombay in early December 1814. Captain Andrew McQuaker died aboard Hannah in April 1816 as she was sailing from Bombay to Calcutta.

In late 1819 the government appointed Captain Francis Augustus Collier of Liverpool to command the naval portion of a joint navy-army punitive expedition against the Joasmi (Al Qasimi) pirates at Ras al-Khaimah in the Persian Gulf. The naval force consisted of Liverpool, Eden, Curlew, several EIC cruisers including HCS Aurora, and a number of gun and mortar boats. There were also a large number of transports to carry troops and supplies. One of the transports was Hannah

After destroying Ras-al-Khaima, the British then spent the rest of December and early January moving up and down the coast destroying forts and vessels. The capture and destruction of the fortifications and ships in the port was a massive blow for the Gulf pirates. British casualties were minimal.

Her owners had tendered Hannah while she was still on her way from London. After the expedition she sailed to China, but on her return her owners successfully tendered her on 13 December 1820 for a second punitive expedition.

Year	Master	Owner	Trade	Source
1820	M'Quaker	Buxton & Co.	London–Bombay	LR
1820	Heathorn	Captain & Co.	London–Bombay	RS
1825	Shepherd	Forbes & Co.	London–Bombay	LR
1825	Lamb	Forbes & Co.	London–Bombay	RS
1830	Shephard	Forbes & Co.	London–Bombay	LR & RS
1833	Jackson	Forbes & Co.	London–Bombay	LR
1833	Shepherd	Inglis & Co.	London–Bombay	RS
