= List of shipwrecks in June 1822 =

The list of shipwrecks in June 1822 includes some ships sunk, foundered, grounded, or otherwise lost during June 1822.

== 1 June ==
List of shipwrecks: 1 June 1822
| Ship | State | Description |
|---|---|---|
| Grace | United Kingdom | The ship was destroyed by fire at the Cape of Good Hope. All on board were rescued. She was on a voyage from New South Wales to London. |

== 2 June ==
List of shipwrecks: 2 June 1822
| Ship | State | Description |
|---|---|---|
| Llanstephan Castle | United Kingdom | The ship was wrecked on Saint Pierre Island. Her crew were rescued. |
| Thornton | United Kingdom | The ship was driven ashore near Ottendorf, Duchy of Schleswig. She was on a voyage from Hull, Yorkshire to Hamburg. Thornton was later refloated and resumed her voyage. |

== 3 June ==
List of shipwrecks: 3 June 1822
| Ship | State | Description |
|---|---|---|
| Patrioten | Denmark | The ship was wrecked on Læsø. Her crew were rescued. She was on a voyage from Liverpool, Lancashire, United Kingdom to Helsingør. |

== 8 June ==
List of shipwrecks: 8 June 1822
| Ship | State | Description |
|---|---|---|
| General Nugent | (United Kingdom of Great Britain and Ireland) Jamaica | The drogher was wrecked off Point Henderson. |

== 9 June ==
List of shipwrecks: 9 June 1822
| Ship | State | Description |
|---|---|---|
| Blessing | United Kingdom | The ship was wrecked at "Servilla", Cuba. |
| Harriet | (United Kingdom of Great Britain and Ireland) British North America | The ship was lost in the Grey Islands. Her crew were rescued. |

== 10 June ==
List of shipwrecks: 10 June 1822
| Ship | State | Description |
|---|---|---|
| Brothers | United Kingdom | The ship was driven ashore at Richibucto, New Brunswick, British North America. Her crew were rescued. Brothers was eventually refloated; she arrived at The Downs on 17 October 1823. |
| Commerce | United States | The full-rigged ship was wrecked at Môle-Saint-Nicolas, Haiti. Her crew were rescued. She was on a voyage from St. Thomas, Virgin Islands to Saint-Domingue. |

== 11 June ==
List of shipwrecks: 11 June 1822
| Ship | State | Description |
|---|---|---|
| Industry | Norway | The ship was wrecked on the Goodwin Sands, Kent, United Kingdom. Her crew survived. She was on a voyage from Vaasa, Sweden to Havre de Grâce, Seine-Inférieure, France. |

== 12 June ==
List of shipwrecks: 12 June 1822
| Ship | State | Description |
|---|---|---|
| Charles William | United Kingdom | The ship was destroyed by fire at Stockholm, Sweden. |
| Vittoria | Stettin | The ship was driven ashore at Lacanau, Gironde. Her crew were rescued. |

== 13 June ==
List of shipwrecks: 13 June 1822
| Ship | State | Description |
|---|---|---|
| Henry & Elizabeth | United Kingdom | The ship was driven ashore near Warnemünde, Rostock. She was refloated on 16 June and taken in to Warnemünde. |
| Perseverance | United Kingdom | The ship was driven ashore at "Boven Bergen", where she was subsequently wrecked. She was on a voyage from Alnmouth, Northumberland to Saint Petersburg, Russia. |

== 14 June ==
List of shipwrecks: 14 June 1822
| Ship | State | Description |
|---|---|---|
| Fame | United Kingdom | The ship was wrecked at the Cape of Good Hope with the loss of eight lives. She was on a voyage from Madras, India to London. |
| King | Sweden | The ship was beached at Karlskrona. She was on a voyage from Stockholm to Hull, Yorkshire, United Kingdom. |

== 18 June ==
List of shipwrecks: 18 June 1822
| Ship | State | Description |
|---|---|---|
| Thompson Packet | United Kingdom | The brig was driven ashore and damaged on the south west coast of Anticosti Island, Nova Scotia, British North America. She was on a voyage from Dumfries to Quebec City, Lower Canada, British North America. Thompson Packet was later refloated. She arrived at Quebec City on 11 July. |

== 21 June ==
List of shipwrecks: 21 June 1822
| Ship | State | Description |
|---|---|---|
| Giraffa | Spain | The ship was beached at Almeria. She was on a voyage from Adra to Flint, United Kingdom. |

== 22 June ==
List of shipwrecks: 22 June 1822
| Ship | State | Description |
|---|---|---|
| Venus | United Kingdom | The ship was wrecked on the Falsterbo Reef, in the Baltic Sea. |
| Wesley | United Kingdom | The ship was driven ashore and damaged at Southern Head, Newfoundland, British North America. She was on a voyage from Sunderland, County Durham to St. John's, Newfoundland. |

== 23 June ==
List of shipwrecks: 23 June 1822
| Ship | State | Description |
|---|---|---|
| HMS Drake | Royal Navy | The Cherokee-class brig-sloop was wrecked in Trepassey Bay with the loss of 21 lives. She was on a voyage from Halifax, Nova Scotia, British North America to St. John's, Newfoundland, British North America. |

== 26 June ==
List of shipwrecks: 26 June 1822
| Ship | State | Description |
|---|---|---|
| Lady Forbes | United Kingdom | The whaler was crushed by ice and sank in the Davis Straits. Her crew survived. |

== 29 June ==
List of shipwrecks: 29 June 1822
| Ship | State | Description |
|---|---|---|
| Ann | (United Kingdom of Great Britain and Ireland) Jamaica | The schooner ran aground on the Portland Keys, She was refloated but was consequently beached in the Salt River. She was on a voyage from the Chagres River to Jamaica. |

== 30 June ==
List of shipwrecks: 30 June 1822
| Ship | State | Description |
|---|---|---|
| Mayflower | United Kingdom | The ship was driven ashore at Newhaven, Sussex and consequently sank. She was later refloated and taken in to Newhaven. |

== Unknown date ==
List of shipwrecks: Unknown date in June 1822
| Ship | State | Description |
|---|---|---|
| Leonidas | United States of the Ionian Islands | The ship foundered in the Adriatic Sea in late June. Her crew were rescued. She was on a voyage from Trieste to Malta. |
| Samuel and Maryanne | United Kingdom | The ship was driven ashore and wrecked on the coast of Norway in early June with the loss of her captain. She was on a voyage from Harwich, Essex to Stavanger, Norway. |
| Visconde de Monte Alegre | Portugal | The ship ran aground in the Tagus between Belém and "Paca d'Arcos". She was on a voyage from Lisbon to Rio de Janeiro, Brazil. Visconde de Monte Alegre was subsequently destroyed by fire on 18 June. |
