= Paragon (ship) =

Several vessels have been named Paragon:

- Paragon (1800 Liverpool ship) was launched at Liverpool. She made one voyage in 1801 as a slave ship and was lost shortly thereafter.
- Paragon (1800 Whitby ship) was launched at Whitby. Between 1803 and 1805 she served as an armed defense ship protecting Britain's coasts and convoys. She then served as a transport on the 1805 naval expedition to capture the Cape of Good Hope. Next, she returned to mercantile service and in 1814 a French privateer captured her, but the British Royal Navy recaptured her the next day. She sailed to India in 1818 under a license from the British East India Company (EIC}, and was wrecked in March 1819 while inbound to Calcutta.
- Paragon (1801 ship) was launched at Lancaster. She traded across the Atlantic with the West Indies, South America, and North America. She captured one French vessel, and was herself captured, but swiftly recaptured by the Royal Navy. She was last listed in 1830, but with stale data from 1825.
- Paragon (1803 ship) was launched at Portsmouth, Virginia. She sailed for some time as a merchantman under the British flag. She then made three whaling voyages between 1819 and 1828, and sank at sea near Oahu on her third.
- Paragon (1813 ship) was a schooner launched at Medford, Massachusetts, that HMS Curlew captured.
- Paragon (1814 ship), of 383 tons (bm), was launched at Greenock. She was lost off Barbados in July 1832 but her crew was saved.

Citations
