= List of ships named Forbes =

Several ships have been named Forbes. Some have been named for Charles Forbes MP in 1818, his daughter Katherine Stewart Forbes, his wife Lady Forbes, or Castle Forbes, the seat of the peerage Lord Forbes.

== Lady Forbes (1799 ship) ==
Lady Forbes was launched at Leith in 1799. She became a West Indiaman, sailing under a series of letters of marque. She survived a major hurricane and an attack by pirates. From 1819, she was a whaler in the British northern whale fishery. She made three annual whaling voyages before she was lost in 1822 when ice crushed her.

== Forbes (1803 ship) ==
Forbes, of 530 tons (bm), was launched at Chittagong in 1803. She was broken up at Fort Gloster in 1822.

== Lord Forbes (1803 ship) ==
Lord Forbes was launched at Chester in 1803 as a West Indiaman. She soon became an "armed defense ship", but by 1805 had returned to being a West Indiaman. She made two voyages as an "extra" ship for the British East India Company (EIC). She continued trading with India until 1817 when she sustained damage on her way to Bengal. There she was surveyed, condemned and sold.

== Forbes (1805 ship) ==
Forbes was launched at Calcutta in 1805. She was wrecked in the Billeton Straits in the southern part of the Karimata Strait in 1806. Her owner was Forbes & Co., which John Forbes of Aberdeenshire, Scotland, had established in Bombay in 1767.

== Lady Forbes (1808 ship) ==
Lady Forbes, of 58 tons (bm), was a sloop launched at Leith in 1808. On 6 March 1832 she was driven ashore at Aberdeen. Her crew were rescued. She was on a voyage from Fraserburgh, Aberdeenshire to Leith.

== Castle Forbes (1818 ship) ==
Castle Forbes was a merchant ship built by Robert Gibbon & Sons at Aberdeen, Scotland in 1818. She was the first vessel built in Aberdeen for trade with India. She then made several voyages to India, sailing under a license from the British East India Company (EIC). She made two voyages transporting convicts from Ireland to Australia. She sustained damage in 1826 on a voyage to India and was condemned at the Cape of Good Hope. However, she was repaired. She was last listed in 1832 (Register of Shipping), and in 1838 in Lloyd's Register (LR).

== Katherine Stewart Forbes (1818 ship) ==
Katherine Stewart Forbes was built by William & Henry Pitcher at Northfleet dockyard in Kent, England in 1818. She initially sailed between Britain and India under a license from the British East India Company (EIC). She next transported convicts to Australia in 1830 and 1832. She also carried early settlers to South Australia in 1837, and New Zealand in 1841 and 1851, and mapped part of the coast of Borneo. She made several trips from England to Australia and between Australian settlements.

== Charles Forbes (1821 ship) ==
Charles Forbes, of 917 tons (bm), was launched by J. Thomas on 19 June 1821 in Calcutta. She was 147 ft (45 m) long, and with a beam of 38 ft 8 in (11.8 m). In 1822 her owners transferred her registry to Bombay. The ship ran aground on the Pyramid Shoals, in the Strait of Malacca and was wrecked on 2 May 1851. The paddle steamer Malta rescued some of the crew. HMS Amazon subsequently rescued the rest. Charles Forbes was on a voyage from Bombay to China.

== Sir Charles Forbes (1824 ship) ==
Sir Charles Forbes was a barque built at Aberdeen in 1824. Between 1825 and 1837 she made three voyages transporting convicts to Hobart and one convict voyage to Sydney. In 1842 she made one voyage carrying emigrants from England to New Zealand under the auspices of the New Zealand Company. She was last listed in 1861.

== Forbes (1829 ship) ==
Forbes, of 161 tons (bm), was a teak-built steam vessel, built at the Howrah Dock Co, Sulkea (opposite Calcutta), and launched in 1829. She had two Bolton & Watt engines that generated a total of 120 horsepower. She was built for Mesers. Mackintosh & Co. at a cost of 310,000 or 400,000 rupees. She made voyages to China and the Red Sea until in 1837 the Calcutta Steam Tug Association purchased her to tow vessels on the Hooghly River. In 1830 James Matheson, of Jardine Matheson, chartered Forbes to tow Jamesina to Canton with 840 chests of Bengal opium. He bet $1000 that she could reach Lintin from Sandheads in a month. Forbes started out, but ran onto a sandbank. On 14 March 1829 she finally left. Forbes towed Jamesina from Calcutta to Singapore, from where Jamesina and Forbes both proceeded under sail. Forbes could only carry 130 tons of coal; Jamesina carried another 52 tons, in addition to her opium. On 12 April, with only four days of coal left, the two parted. Forbes arrived in Hong Kong two days before Jamesina. Matheson lost his bet, but Jamesina was still the first opium vessel to arrive at Canton that year.

== See also ==
List of ships named Clan Forbes
