= Orient (1814 ship) =

History

United Kingdom
- Name: Orient
- Namesake: Orient
- Owner: 1815:Murry; EIC voyages 1&2:Stewart Marjoribanks; EIC voyages 3&4:Thomas White; Thereafter: Various
- Builder: Matthew Smith, Calcutta
- Launched: 29 October 1814
- Fate: Sold for breaking up in 1865

General characteristics
- Tons burthen: 580, or 596, or 5962/94, or 597, or 598 (bm)
- Length: 122 ft 4 in (37.3 m)
- Beam: 34 ft 0 in (10.4 m)

Orient was launched in 1814, at Calcutta. She sailed to England and from then on was based there. She traded with India into the 1830s. She participated in a naval punitive expedition in 1819, and performed four voyages for the British East India Company. From the 1840s, she continued to sail widely until she was condemned in 1865, and sold for breaking up.

== Career ==
=== Early career ===
Shortly after her launch, Orient sailed to England. She first appeared in Lloyd's Register in 1815, with W. Rutter, master, Js. Murry, owner, and trade London–Bengal.

From 1814, the EIC lost its monopoly on the trade between Britain and India. Orient then traded with India under a license from the EIC. For instance, on 17 March 1817, Captain R. Cook sailed for Bengal.

=== Punitive expedition ===
In late 1819, the government appointed Captain Francis Augustus Collier of HMS Liverpool to command the naval portion of a joint navy-army punitive expedition against the Joasmi (Al Qasimi) pirates at Ras al-Khaimah in the Persian Gulf. The naval force consisted of HMS Liverpool, Eden, Curlew, several EIC cruisers including HCS Aurora, and a number of gun and mortar boats. Eighteen transports, most merchant vessels registered at Bombay, carried troops and supplies. One of the transports was Orient.

After destroying Ras al-Khaima, the British then spent the rest of December and early January moving up and down the coast destroying forts and vessels. The capture and destruction of the fortifications and ships in the port was a massive blow for the Gulf pirates. British casualties were minimal.

Then on 3 April 1821, Captain P. Wallace sailed Orient to Madras.

=== EIC voyages ===
The EIC chartered Orient four times, each time for a single voyage.

==== EIC voyage #1 (1823–1824) ====
On 22 April 1822, the EIC accepted a tender from Orient's owner for a voyage at a rate of £10 15s per chartered ton. Captain Thomas White sailed from Portsmouth on 26 May 1823, bound for Bengal and Madras. Orient reached Simon's Bay on 14 August, and arrived at Diamond Harbour on 30 October. She was Calcutta on 18 November. Homeward bound, she was at Diamond Harbour again on 3 January 1824. She was at Madras on 17 January, and Point de Galle on 11 February. She reached St Helena on 19 April, and arrived at The Downs on 18 June.

==== EIC voyage #2 (1825–1826) ====
The EIC accepted a tender of £14 7s per chartered ton for one voyage to China and Quebec. Captain White sailed from Portsmouth on 3 July 1825, bound for China and Quebec. She reached Penang on 13 November, and arrived at Whampoa anchorage on 30 January 1826. Homeward bound, she crossed the Second Bar on 10 March, and reached on St Helena on 4 July. She arrived at Quebec on 4 September, and returned to her mornings on 20 November.

==== EIC voyage #3 (1831–1832) ====
The EIC on 29 April 1831, chartered Orient for a voyage to and from Bengal at a rate of £7 19s d per ton. Captain White sailed from Portsmouth on 12 July 1831, bound for Bengal. Orient reached the Cape of Good Hope on 13 September, and arrived at Calcutta on 29 November. Homeward bound, she was at Kedgeree on 14 February 1832, was at the Cape on 20 April, reached St Helena on 7 May, and arrived at The Downs on 22 June.

==== EIC voyage #4 (1833–1834) ====
The EIC on 1 May 1833, chartered Orient for a voyage to and from Bengal at a rate of £8 13s 6d per ton. Captain White sailed from Portsmouth on 18 June 1833, bound for Madras and Bengal. Orient reached Madras on 4 November, and arrived at Calcutta on 19 December. Homeward bound, she was at Saugor on 6 February 1834, and Madras again on 24 February, reached St Helena on 28 May, and arrived at The Downs on 20 July.

=== Later career ===
The data below comes from Lloyd's Register, which was only as accurate as shipowners chose to keep it.

Year	Master	Owner	Trade	Notes
1835	T. White	White	London–Calcutta	
1840	T. White	White	London–Sydney	Damages repaired in 1838
1841	Wales		London	

Between 1838 and 1841, Orient carried emigrants to Australia. Captain Douglas Wales sailed from England on 6 April 1839, with passengers and some 300 emigrants for Australia.

Year	Master	Owner	Trade	Notes
1845				Not listed
1846	D. Wales	D. Wales	London–Madras	Underwent a "large repair" in 1845
1850	P. Cory	J. Griffiths	London–China	
1855		Griffiths	London	Underwent a "small repair" in 1853
1860	F. King	Griffiths	London	Underwent a "small repair" in 1857
1861	F. King; N. Merritt	Griffiths; Shearer & Co.	London; Clyde–West Indies	Homeport of Ardrossan
1864	N. Merritt	J. Barr & Co.	Clyde	Homeport of Ardrossan; entry marked "condemned"

== Fate ==
Orient, having been condemned after survey, was sold in 1864 for breaking up.
