= Pascoa (1816 ship) =

Ship launched in Calcutta in 1816

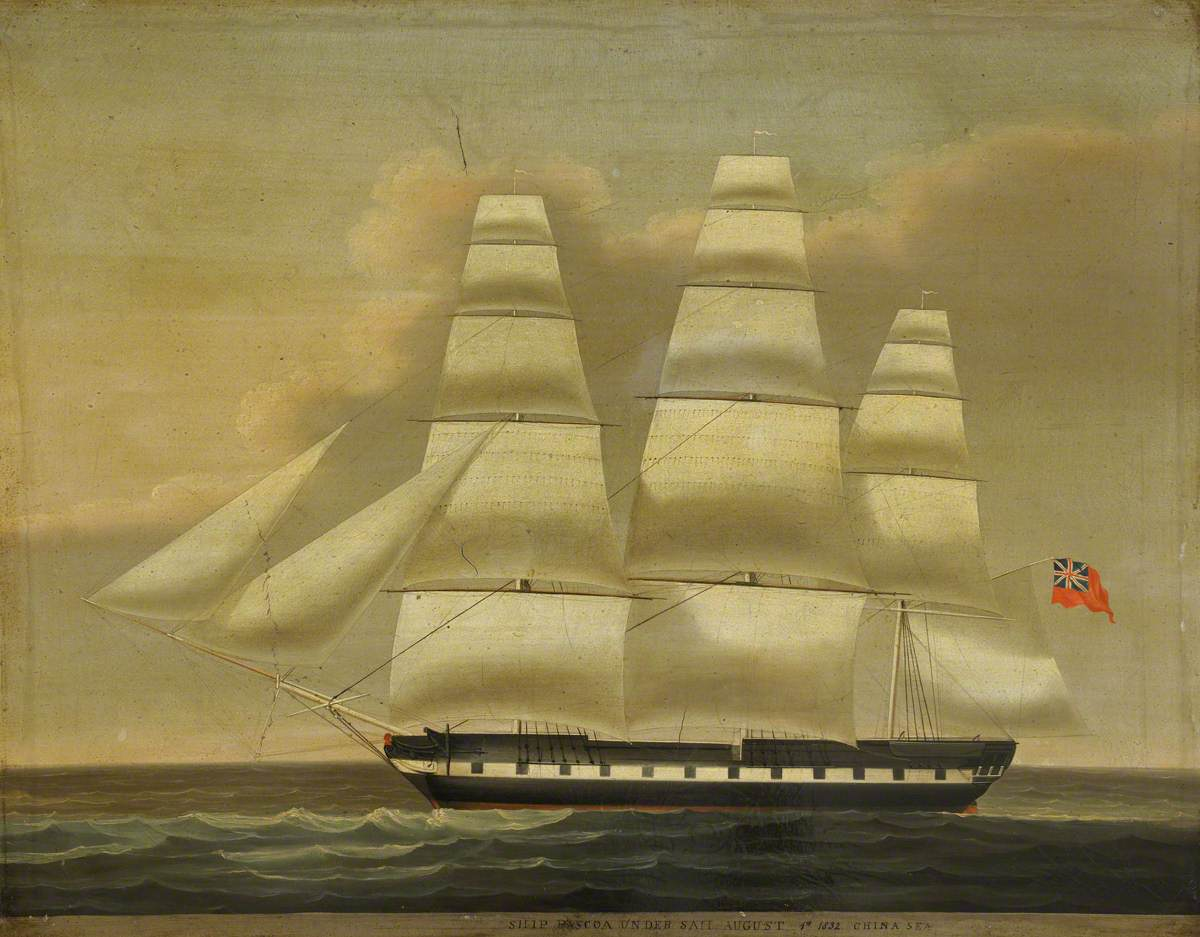
- Ship Pascoa under sail, 1 August 1832, China Sea

History

United Kingdom
- Name: Pascoa
- Builder: Matthew Smith, Howrah, Calcutta
- Launched: 1816
- Fate: Wrecked 1836

General characteristics
- Tons burthen: 735, or 802, (bm)

Pascoa was launched at Calcutta in 1816. She was a "country ship", trading around India and between India and China. She was a transport in 1819-20, during the British punitive campaign against the Al Qasimi pirates. She was lost in 1836.

== Career ==
In late 1819, the government appointed Captain Francis Augustus Collier of HMS Liverpool to command the naval portion of a joint navy-army punitive expedition against the Joasmi (Al Qasimi) pirates at Ras al-Khaimah in the Persian Gulf. The naval force consisted of HMS Liverpool, Eden, and Curlew, several EIC cruisers including HCS Aurora, and a number of gun and mortar boats. Eighteen transports, most of them merchant vessels registered at Bombay, carried troops and supplies. One of the transports was Pascoa, from Calcutta.

After destroying Ras al-Khaima, the British then spent the rest of December and early January moving up and down the coast destroying forts and vessels. The capture and destruction of the fortifications and ships in the port was a massive blow for the Gulf pirates. British casualties were minimal.

Year	Master	Owner	Source
1819	Edward Touissaint	T.de Souza & Co.	East-India register and directory (1819), p. 136.
1824	Hugh Cathie	Mercer & Co.	East-India register and directory (1824), p. 155.
1827	Hugh Cathie	Mercer & Co.	East-India register and directory (1827), p. 156.
1828	Hugh Cathie		East-India register and directory (1828), p. 154.
1829	William Morgan	Cursetjee & Co.	East-India register and directory (1829), p. 346.

In 1827 Parsi merchants at Bombay purchased Pascoa. Her primary trade was carrying cotton from Bombay and Bengal to China.

== Fate ==
In December 1836, Pascoa struck a rock outside the Romania Islands. (Note: This may be a group of islands and rocks around 1.316994°N 104.299311°E, some seven miles NNW of Pedra Branca.) She had been sailing from Singapore to China.

She began taking on water but was able to reach Singapore Roads where she sank in shoal water. All her cargo was retrieved, though most of it was damaged; the hull was left in place. In June 1845, Captain Faber used gunpowder to blow the hull to pieces as it had become a hazard to navigation.
