= Diana (1818 ship) =

History

United Kingdom
- Name: Diana
- Builder: John Peter Fearon
- Launched: 1817
- Fate: Wrecked in June 1820

General characteristics
- Tons burthen: 506 (bm)
- Propulsion: Sail
- Notes: Teak-built

Diana was a merchant ship built in 1817 at Cochin, British India. She made one voyage to Britain before the British government hired her to transport troops for a punitive expedition against the pirates of Ras al Khaima. It was in connection with that operation that she wrecked off the coast of Muscat in 1820.

Having Diana built in Cochin made her less expensive than having her built in Bombay, even after taking into account a number of costs that would not have been incurred there.

Diana appears in Lloyd's Register (LR) for 1820 (published in 1819), with Williams, master and owner. Her voyage is described as Liverpool-Bombay. (Lloyd's Register incorrectly gives her launch place as Bombay.)

== The punitive expedition ==
In late 1819, the government appointed Captain Francis Augustus Collier of Liverpool to command the naval portion of a joint navy-army punitive expedition against the pirates at Ras al-Khaimah in the Persian Gulf. The naval force consisted of Liverpool, Eden, Curlew, several EIC cruisers including HCS Aurora, and a number of gun and mortar boats. Later several vessels belonging to the Sultan of Muscat joined them.

On the army side, Major General Sir William Keir commanded some 5,000 troops in transports. For the expedition the government hired 18 transports. Thirteen were Bombay ships. One of the non-Bombay transports was Diana, which had returned from Liverpool.

In May 1820, the government engaged Diana and three other vessels to bring back some detachments of General Keir's force.

== Loss ==
Diana wrecked in June on the Khuriya Muriya Islands (or Curia Muria) off the coast of Muscat. Captain Williams, all the officers (Messers. D. Henderson and G. Oliphant), and eleven of the crew drowned. Lloyd's List reported a message from Muscat dated 6 October, that Diana had wrecked on the island of "Cuira", and reported the same casualties. (The largest of the four islands is Al-Hallaniyah at 17.509430°N 56.017577°E.)

There were 54 survivors who reached the island on which Diana had wrecked. Sometime after 15 July 1820, two Arab buggalows (dhows) arrived at the island. They were on their way from Zanzibar to Muscat and had stopped at the island to get water. They took the survivors to Muscat, minus four Portuguese seamen who had earlier constructed a raft. One of the buggalows was also carrying the crew of Nadir Shah, which had wrecked at Zanzibar. At Muscat the survivors went on board Robarts, which conveyed them to Bombay, arriving on 22 May 1821.
