= Grace (ship) =

Several ships have been named Grace:

- Grace (1811 ship) was launched at Ipswich. She spent most of her career sailing to South America. However, she was returning to Britain from New South Wales in 1822 when a fire that started in her cargo destroyed her.
- Grace (1814 ship) was launched in New York in 1812. She was taken in prize circa 1814. She then became a Falmouth, Cornwall, packet, sailing for the Post Office. She primarily sailed to New York via Halifax and Bermuda, but also sailed to the Mediterranean and Brazil. She twice encountered American privateers, repelling one and outpacing the other. In 1821 she sailed on a seal and whale hunting voyage to the South Shetland Islands and the coast of Chile. She foundered in the South Atlantic circa May 1823 while homeward bound.
