= List of shipwrecks in July 1824 =

The list of shipwrecks in July 1824 includes some ships sunk, foundered, grounded, or otherwise lost during July 1824.

== 1 July ==
List of shipwrecks: 1 July 1824
Ship	State	Description
Fortitude	United Kingdom	The brig was driven ashore and wrecked on the west coast of Nash Island, in the Bristol Channel with the loss of all on board. She was on a voyage from Newport, Monmouthshire to Waterford.
Lovely Nelly	United Kingdom	The ship was driven ashore near Bideford, Devon. Her crew were rescued. She was on a voyage from Galway to Bristol, Gloucestershire. Lovely Nelly was refloated the next day and taken in to Appledore, Devon.

== 2 July ==
List of shipwrecks: 2 July 1824
Ship	State	Description
Enigheit	Flag unknown	The ship was driven ashore and sank west of Dartmouth, Devon, United Kingdom. She was on a voyage from Havre de Grâce, Seine-Inférieure, France to "Saint Sebastian". Enigheit was later refloated and taken in to Dartmouth.
Resulti	Portugal	The ship ran aground and was damaged beyond repair at Lisbon. She was on a voyage from Turku, Grand Duchy of Finland to Lisbon.
Udny (or Udney)	United Kingdom	The ship was wrecked in the Inhambane River, Mozambique Channel. All on board were rescued.

== 4 July ==
List of shipwrecks: 4 July 1824
Ship	State	Description
Margaret	United Kingdom	The schooner was wrecked on the Rush Bank, in the Irish Sea off Wexford. She was on a voyage from Glasgow, Renfrewshire to Dunmore East, County Waterford.

== 5 July ==
List of shipwrecks: 5 July 1824
Ship	State	Description
Janet	United Kingdom	The ship was wrecked at Scarlet Head, Caithness. Her crew were rescued.

== 8 July ==
List of shipwrecks: 8 July 1824
Ship	State	Description
Union	Spain	The ship was captured by a Colombian privateer in the Atlantic Ocean (36°24′N 4°00′W). She was on a voyage from Torraveja to Málaga and the Bay of Biscay. Union was set afire and destroyed on 10 July. Her crew were put aboard Hebe (United Kingdom).

== 9 July ==
List of shipwrecks: 9 July 1824
Ship	State	Description
Fortitude	United Kingdom	The brig was wrecked on the Nass Sands, in the Irish Sea with the loss of all ten people on board. She was on a voyage from Newport, Monmouthshire to Waterford.
Mary	United Kingdom	The ship was driven ashore and wrecked in Mossel Bay, Cape of Good Hope. All on board were rescued. She was on a voyage from Bengal, India to London.

== 12 July ==
List of shipwrecks: 12 July 1824
Ship	State	Description
Sancho Panza	United States	The ship was wrecked on the Allikrano, in the Gulf of Mexico. All on board were rescued. She was on a voyage from New York to Tampico, Mexico.

== 13 July ==
List of shipwrecks: 13 July 1824
Ship	State	Description
Mary	United Kingdom	The ship struck rocks off Lindisfarne, Northumberland and was abandoned by her crew. She was later brought in to Lindisfarne.

== 15 July ==
List of shipwrecks: 15 July 1824
Ship	State	Description
George IV	United Kingdom	The ship was driven ashore at the Cape of Good Hope. All on board were rescued. She was on a voyage from Mauritius to London. George the Fourth was later refloated and taken in to Cape Town, Cape Colony for repairs.
Kowie Packet	(United Kingdom of Great Britain and Ireland) Cape Colony	The ship was driven ashore in the Kowie River.

== 18 July ==
List of shipwrecks: 18 July 1824
Ship	State	Description
Belinda	(United Kingdom of Great Britain and Ireland) New South Wales	The sealer, a brig, was wrecked on Middle Island, in the Recherche Archipelago. Her crew were rescued by Nereus ( (United Kingdom of Great Britain and Ireland) New South Wales.
Tordenskiold	(Sweden) Norway	The ship foundered 60 nautical miles (110 km) off the coast of Norway with the loss of two lives. She was on a voyage from Boston to Christiansand.

== 20 July ==
List of shipwrecks: 20 July 1824
Ship	State	Description
Golden Grove	United Kingdom	The ship was driven ashore near Yarmouth, Isle of Wight. She was on a voyage from Youghall, County Cork to Portsmouth, Hampshire.

== 21 July ==
List of shipwrecks: 21 July 1824
Ship	State	Description
De Hoop	Netherlands	The ship struck the Runnel Stone and was abandoned. She was on a voyage from Rotterdam, South Holland to Liverpool, Lancashire, United Kingdom. De Hoop was later taken in to Plymouth, Devon, United Kingdom.
Phoenix	United Kingdom	The ship ran aground on the Sow and Pigs Reef, Sydney, Australia. She was later refloated but declared a constructive total loss. Phoenix subsequently served as a prison hulk until 1837.

== 23 July ==
List of shipwrecks: 23 July 1824
Ship	State	Description
Albion	United Kingdom	The ship was driven ashore and wrecked at Cape Town, Cape Colony.
Burossa	United Kingdom	The ship was driven ashore and wrecked at Cape Town.
George the Fourth	United Kingdom	The ship was driven ashore and wrecked at Cape Town.

== 24 July ==
List of shipwrecks: 24 July 1824
Ship	State	Description
James	United Kingdom	The schooner was wrecked off Lindisfarne, Northumberland. Her crew were rescued.
Quatre Amigos	Portugal	The ship was destroyed by fire off Skagen, Denmark. She was on a voyage from Faial Island, Azores to Gothenburg, Sweden and Copenhagen, Denmark.

== 25 July ==
List of shipwrecks: 25 July 1824
Ship	State	Description
Anglem	United Kingdom	The ship was driven ashore and wrecked at Maryport, Cumberland.

== 26 July ==
List of shipwrecks: 26 July 1824
Ship	State	Description
Cumberland	United Kingdom	The ship was severely damaged by fire at North Shields, County Durham.
Thomas	United Kingdom	The ship was driven ashore and wrecked at Corton, Suffolk. Her crew were rescued. She was on a voyage from Newcastle upon Tyne, Northumberland to Ipswich, Suffolk.

== 29 July ==
List of shipwrecks: 29 July 1824
Ship	State	Description
Hopewell	United Kingdom	The ship was destroyed by fire at Maryport, Cumberland.

== 30 July ==
List of shipwrecks: 30 July 1824
Ship	State	Description
Swift	United Kingdom	The ship was wrecked on Long Island, Bahamas. She was on a voyage from Havana, Cuba to London.

== 31 July ==
List of shipwrecks: 31 July 1824
Ship	State	Description
Britannia	United Kingdom	The ship struck the Heaps Sand, in the North Sea and foundered. Her crew were rescued.
Dykes	United Kingdom	The ship was damaged by fire off Flint.

== Unknown date ==
List of shipwrecks: Unknown date in July 1824
Ship	State	Description
Briton	United Kingdom	The ship was trapped by ice off the coast of Iceland and was abandoned by her crew.
Chace	United States	The ship was wrecked in the Abaco Islands in early July. Her crew were rescued, She was on a voyage from Charleston, South Carolina to Havana, Cuba.
Cowie	United Kingdom	The ship was lost in Algoa Bay.
Dolphin	United States	The schooner capsized in a squall. Her crew were rescued. She was on a voyage from New York to the Spanish Main.
Elizabeth Frederica	Netherlands	The ship foundered in the North Sea in late July.
Ellen	United Kingdom	The ship was wrecked in the White Sea in late July.
Franklin	United States	The schooner was wrecked in the Caicos Islands in late July.
Heart of Oak	United Kingdom	The brig capsized in a squall 6 nanometres (6.0×10^{−12} km) from Saint John, New Brunswick, British North America in early July. She was later refloated and sold.
Joseph	United States	The ship was wrecked on the Memory Rock in early July.
Julia	United Kingdom	The ship was last sighted during July, presumed subsequently foundered with the loss of all hands.
Lavinia	United Kingdom	The ship ran aground on the Middle Ground, in the Kattegat. She was on a voyage from Memel, Prussia to Boston, Lincolnshire. Lavinia was later refloated and taken in to Copenhagen, Denmark for repairs.
Mercury	United Kingdom	The brig was abandoned in the Atlantic Ocean on or before 17 July.
Rose Virginie	France	The ship was wrecked on Cape Blanc, French Empire between 3 and 16 July. Five of her crew were rescued by Fox (United Kingdom). Other survivors were taken prisoner by the Moors. Rose Virginie was on a voyage from Senegal to Cherbourg, Seine Maritime.
