= List of shipwrecks in August 1836 =

The list of shipwrecks in August 1836 includes ships sunk, foundered, wrecked, grounded, or otherwise lost during August 1836.

== 1 August ==
List of shipwrecks: 1 August 1836
Ship	State	Description
Active	United Kingdom	The schooner was wrecked at Somosomo, in the Fiji Islands. Her crew survived, but some of them were murdered by the local inhabitants.
Richard Bartley	United Kingdom	The ship was wrecked on the Haisborough Sands, in the North Sea off the coast of Norfolk. Her crew were rescued. She was on a voyage from Licata Sicily to Newcastle upon Tyne, Northumberland.
Suzanna	(Portugal) Macao	The barque was wrecked at "Nan-con", China with the loss of eleven of her crew. She was on a voyage from Bombay, India to Macao.
Vrow Margaretha	Duchy of Holstein	The ship was driven ashore on Neuwerk. She was on a voyage from Flensburg to King's Lynn, Norfolk.

== 2 August ==
List of shipwrecks: 2 August 1836
Ship	State	Description
Perseverance	United Kingdom	The ship was driven ashore near Donaghadee, County Down. She was on a voyage from Westport, County Mayo to Liverpool, Lancashire.

== 3 August ==
List of shipwrecks: 3 August 1836
Ship	State	Description
Crown	United Kingdom	The ship was abandoned in the Atlantic Ocean with the loss of a crew member. Survivors were rescued by Voyager (United Kingdom). Crown was on a voyage from Quebec City, Lower Canada, British North America to London.
Jane	United Kingdom	The ship sprang a leak and was beached at Peterhead, Aberdeenshire, where she was wrecked.

== 4 August ==
List of shipwrecks: 4 August 1836
Ship	State	Description
Cato	United Kingdom	The ship was run down and sunk in the River Mersey by William Huskisson (United Kingdom). She was on a voyage from Liverpool, Lancashire to Plymouth, Devon.
Clyde	United Kingdom	The ship foundered in the Indian Ocean off Rodrigues. Her crew survived. She was on a voyage from Batavia, Netherlands East Indies to London.

== 5 August ==
List of shipwrecks: 5 August 1836
Ship	State	Description
Despatch	United Kingdom	The sloop departed from Kirkwall, Orkney Islands for Montrose, Forfarshire. No further trace, presumed foundered with the loss of all hands.
Francis Russell	United Kingdom	The ship was wrecked on the North Head, in the Bay of Bulls. Her crew were rescued. She was on a voyage from Grenada to Newfoundland, British North America.
Jeune Henri	France	The ship was driven ashore at Berry Head, Devon, United Kingdom and was damaged. She was refloated and taken in to Brixham, Devon.
HMS Raleigh	Royal Navy	The Cruizer-class brig-sloop capsized 150 nautical miles (280 km) off Formosa (21°18′N 118°28′E) in a hurricane.

== 6 August ==
List of shipwrecks: 6 August 1836
Ship	State	Description
Mary	United Kingdom	The ship was wrecked at Cape St. George, Newfoundland. She was on a voyage from Halifax, Nova Scotia to Richibucto, New Brunswick.
Rateau	Belgium	The ship was driven ashore at Ostend, West Flanders.

== 7 August ==
List of shipwrecks: 7 August 1836
Ship	State	Description
Dorothy Foster	United Kingdom	The ship was wrecked on Pichell's Reef, off the coast of the Florida Territory. Her crew were rescued. She was on a voyage from Jamaica to London.
Heinrich	flag unknown	The ship was wrecked on "Wulff Island, Russia.
New Zealander	(United Kingdom of Great Britain and Ireland) New South Wales	The schooner was wrecked near "Nukutorua", Table Cape, Van Diemen's Land. Her crew survived.

== 9 August ==
List of shipwrecks: 9 August 1836
Ship	State	Description
Hindoo	United Kingdom	The ship was wrecked in Regidopore Bay, India with the loss of two of her crew. She was on a voyage from Liverpool, Lancashire to Bombay, India.
Odin	Sweden	The steamship was driven ashore at Thisted, Denmark. All on board were rescued. She was on a voyage from London, United Kingdom to Gothenburg.
Two Friends	(United Kingdom of Great Britain and Ireland) Jersey	The ship was wrecked on the Grand Key.

== 10 August ==
List of shipwrecks: 10 August 1836
Ship	State	Description
Camden	United Kingdom	The ship was lost in the Madura Strait. Her crew were rescued. She was on a voyage from Sydney, New South Wales to Soarabaga, Netherlands East Indies.
Elizabeth Starbuck	United States	The ship capsized off Knuckle Point, in the Bay of Islands, New Zealand with the loss of all hands.

== 12 August ==
List of shipwrecks: 12 August 1836
Ship	State	Description
Tiger	United Kingdom	The ship was wrecked on Astorva Island in the Seychelles while sailing from Bombay to Liverpool. Her captain committed suicide on 16 August. Twelve crew sailed for Mahé, Seychelles on 18 September in the ship's longboat. Emma (United Kingdom) rescued the remaining thirteen passengers and crew on 14 October and took them to Mahé, arriving there on 1 November.

== 13 August ==
List of shipwrecks: 13 August 1836
Ship	State	Description
Hannibal	United Kingdom	The brig was capsized by a tornado and sank the Dardanelles with the loss of six of her eight crew. She was later refloated.
Minerva	United Kingdom	The ship was wrecked off the Dardanelles. Her crew were rescued.

== 15 August ==
List of shipwrecks: 15 August 1836
Ship	State	Description
Integrity	United Kingdom	The ship ran aground on the Florida Reef. She was on a voyage from Campeche, Mexico to Liverpool, Lancashire. Integrity was later refloated and taken in to Key West, Florida Territory, where she was condemned.

== 16 August ==
List of shipwrecks: 16 August 1836
Ship	State	Description
Brunswick	United Kingdom	The ship was driven ashore at Breaksea Point, Glamorgan. Her crew were rescued. She was on a voyage from Bideford, Devon to Barry, Glamorgan.
Santa Maria	Brazil	The ship was wrecked on Marajó. She was on a voyage from Belém (then called Pará) to Mexiana Island.
Victorine	United Kingdom	The ship was wrecked on the Mayuqua Reef.

== 17 August ==
List of shipwrecks: 17 August 1836
Ship	State	Description
Sisters	United Kingdom	The brig caught fire and sank in the Mediterranean Sea off Gorgona, Grand Duchy of Tuscany. Her crew were rescued by an Austrian vessel. She was on a voyage from Liverpool, Lancashire to Livorno, Grand Duchy of Tuscany.

== 18 August ==
List of shipwrecks: 18 August 1836
Ship	State	Description
L'Ostendaise	Belgium	The schooner foundered in the Bristol Channel off Lundy Island, Devon, United Kingdom. Her six crew survived. She was on a voyage from Liverpool, Lancashire, United Kingdom to Ostend, West Flanders.
Margaret	United Kingdom	The schooner was driven ashore at "Hornbeck", Denmark. She was on a voyage from Danzig to London. Margaret was later refloated and taken in to Helsingør, Denmark.
Okelina	Hamburg	The ship was abandoned in the North Sea. Her crew were rescued by Malvina (Hamburg). Malvina was on a voyage from Newcastle upon Tyne, Northumberland, United Kingdom to London.

== 19 August ==
List of shipwrecks: 19 August 1836
Ship	State	Description
Warsaw	United Kingdom	The ship was wrecked on Eynhallow, Orkney Islands. Her crew were rescued. She was on a voyage from Arkhangelsk, Russia to Gloucester.

== 20 August ==
List of shipwrecks: 20 August 1836
Ship	State	Description
Hibbert	United Kingdom	The ship collided with Victoria and sank in the River Usk. She was on a voyage from Newport, Monmouthshire to Cork. Hibbert was later refloated.
Windsor	United Kingdom	The ship was wrecked in the Gasper Channel. Her crew were rescued.

== 23 August ==
List of shipwrecks: 23 August 1836
Ship	State	Description
Niord	Norway	The ship struck rocks and was damaged whilst on a voyage from La Rochelle, Charente-Maritime, France to Trondheim. She put into "Indrevar" in a sinking condition.

== 24 August ==
List of shipwrecks: 24 August 1836
Ship	State	Description
Alexandre	France	The ship was lost in the Strait of Malacca. Her crew were rescued.
Ann and Elizabeth	United Kingdom	The ship sprang a leak and foundered in the North Sea off the Sunk Lightship ( Trinity House). Her crew were rescued. She was on a voyage from Saint-Valery-sur-Somme, France to Newcastle upon Tyne, Northumberland.

== 25 August ==
List of shipwrecks: 25 August 1836
Ship	State	Description
Lagan	United Kingdom	The ship was wrecked at the mouth of the Dwina. She was on a voyage from London to Arkhangelsk, Russia.
Respected Friends	United Kingdom	The ship sprang a leak and foundered in the Irish Sea 25 nautical miles (46 km) off St. Ann's Head, Pembrokeshire. Her crew were rescued. She was on a voyage from Milford Haven, Pembrokeshire to Dover, Kent.

== 26 August ==
List of shipwrecks: 26 August 1836
Ship	State	Description
Allies	United Kingdom	The ship sprang a leak and was abandoned in the Atlantic Ocean. Her crew were rescued by Salus (United Kingdom). Allies was on a voyage from Drogheda, County Louth to Quebec City, Lower Canada, British North America.
Catharine	United Kingdom	The ship was wrecked near Ringkøbing, Denmark. Her crew were rescued. She was on a voyage from Stornoway, Isle of Lewis, Outer Hebrides to Saint Petersburg, Russia.
Louisa	Belgium	The ship was wrecked on the Breakwater Bank, in the North Sea. Her crew were rescued. She was on a voyage from Liverpool, Lancashire, United Kingdom to Ostend, West Flanders.

== 27 August ==
List of shipwrecks: 27 August 1836
Ship	State	Description
Ceres	United Kingdom	The ship was wrecked on the Brazil Bank, in Liverpool Bay. Her crew were rescued by lifeboat. She was on a voyage from Littlehampton, Sussex to Runcorn, Cheshire.
Respected Friends	United Kingdom	The ship was abandoned in the Irish Sea off St. Ann's Head, Pembrokeshire. Her crew were rescued by Henry (United Kingdom). Respected Friends was on a voyage from Milford Haven, Pembrokeshire to Dover, Kent.

== 29 August ==
List of shipwrecks: 29 August 1836
Ship	State	Description
Ceres	(United Kingdom of Great Britain and Ireland) New South Wales	The paddle steamer struck the Bullee Nogglen Rock and consequently foundered. All on board survived. She was on a voyage from Newcastle to Sydney.

== 30 August ==
List of shipwrecks: 30 August 1836
Ship	State	Description
Diana	United Kingdom	The sloop was driven ashore and wrecked at Peterhead, Aberdeenshire with the loss of one life. She was on a voyage from Aberdeen to Peterhead.

== Unknown date ==
List of shipwrecks: Unknown date in August 1836
Ship	State	Description
Alexander	France	The ship was wrecked at Coringa, India before 18 August. Her crew survived.
Ardent	United Kingdom	The ship was wrecked near Anticosti Island, Lower Canada, British North America.
Mars	United Kingdom	The ship was driven ashore at Duncansby Head, Caithness. She was on a voyage from Dalhousie, New Brunswick, British North America to South Shields, County Durham. Mars was later refloated and taken in tow, but was subsequently cut adrift and came ashore near Fraserburgh, Aberdeenshire where she was wrecked. Her crew were rescued.
Sir Watkin	United Kingdom	The ship was wrecked on the coast of Senegal before 8 August. Her fifteen crew were rescued by La Dordogne (French Navy).
William Torr	United Kingdom	The whaler foundered in the Atlantic Ocean before 17 August.
