= Ulitea (1829 ship) =

Merchant ship built in Tahiti 1829–1840

History

Society Islands
- Name: Ulitea (Note: A transcription error has resulted in some accounts recording her name as Mitea.)
- Namesake: 19th century British name for Raiatea
- Owner: John Hunter
- Builder: John Hunter, Tahiti
- Launched: c.1829
- Fate: Wrecked 29 February 1840

General characteristics
- Tons burthen: 70, or 75 (bm)
- Sail plan: Schooner

Ulitea was a schooner that John Hunter built in late 1829 or early 1830 in the Society Islands (Tahiti). She primarily traded between Sydney and Tahiti, but also sailed to Valparaiso and New Zealand. She was wrecked in New Zealand in February 1840.

== Career ==
The first mention of Ulitea in the Sydney newspapers occurred in December 1832.

On 19 December 1832, the schooner Ulitea, Hunter, master, arrived at Sydney from Tahiti. She had left on 6 November and was carrying 18 casks of "cocoa-nut oil". Her passengers included Mrs. Hunter and seven children, Captain Buckle, late master of the ship Matthews, which had wrecked at Tahiti, Mr. Robson late owner of Schnapper, which the natives had taken near Tahiti, and some others. Ulitea also brought the information that the whaler Pocklington had touched at Eoora, Tonga.

On 17 August 1833 Ulitea, Captain Hunter, arrived at Sydney from Raitea with 22 tuns of whale oil and the lower rigging from Sir Charles Price, which had wrecked in April at Huahine in the Society Islands.

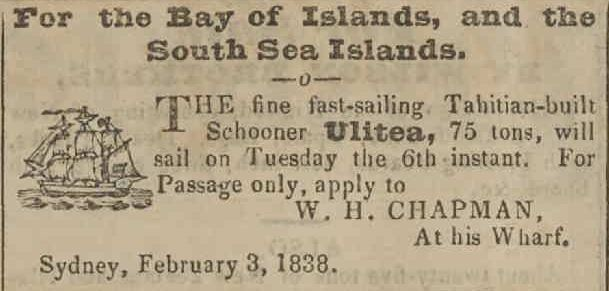

On 18 January 1839 Ulitea, Captain Waddy, sailed for the Society Islands, with sundries. Her only passenger was Captain Hunter, her owner.

== Fate ==
Ulitea was wrecked on the night of 29 February 1840 east of Sulphur Point in Tauranga Harbour. The captain cut away the masts during the night and hoisted a shirt to the bowsprit as a distress signal. A Mr Wilson, together with Maori from the Mission Station, took a boat out and brought all aboard on ashore. Newspaper reports in Australia, and then England and India, incorrectly reported that she had been lost with all aboard.
