= List of ships named Clan Forbes =

Several ships have been named Clan Forbes after the Scottish clan.

- SS Clan Forbes (1882) was a Clan Line cargo ship built by Alexander Stephen and Sons in Glasgow. She was sold to Furness, Withy & Co in 1903 and renamed London City, then scrapped in 1922.
- SS Clan Forbes (1903) was built for Clan Line by William Doxford & Sons at Pallion, Sunderland and sunk by a u-boat in 1918.
- Clan Forbes (1903), a steam fishing trawler, was built by Smith's Dock Company at South Shields, Tyne and Wear, for Aberdeen owners. After sale to Dutch owners she was wrecked as Gerard on 31 October 1915.
- SS Clan Forbes (1938) was a Clan Line cargo liner in their Cameron-class. She survived World War II service and was scrapped in 1959.
- MV Clan Forbes (1961) was a cargo liner, built by Swan, Hunter & Wigham Richardson at Wallsend, Tyne and Wear for Clan Line. She was sold in 1968 Arya National Shipping Company, Iran, and scrapped in 1985.

== See also ==
- List of ships named Forbes
