= HMS Forth (1813) =

Frigate of the Royal Navy

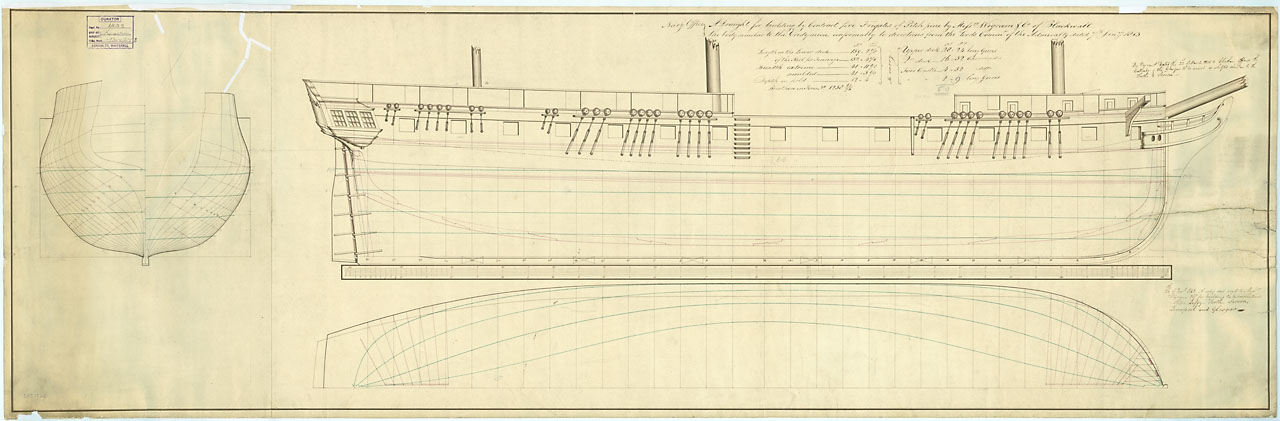
Ship's plan of Forth

HMS Forth was a 50-gun fifth-rate frigate of the Endymion class, launched on 14 June 1813 at Blackwall and broken up at Chatham in July 1819.

== Service ==
From June 1813 to 1815 Forth came under the command of Captain Sir William Bolton in The Downs and later in the year off the Scheldt, with a spell under Sir Edward Codrington in 1814–1815. During service off North America in the War of 1812 under Captain Bolton, the American privateer brig Regent was captured on 19 Sep 1814 in Little Egg Harbor.

From February 1816 until July 1819 Forth came under the command of Captain Sir John Louis, after undergoing a refitting first as a flagship and subsequently as a fourth rate frigate at Chatham.

Pactolus and the Saracen accompanied Forth, the flagship of Rear Admiral Griffith, to spend the winter at Bermuda, setting sail from Halifax on 10 November 1816.
