= John Parker (whaling master) =

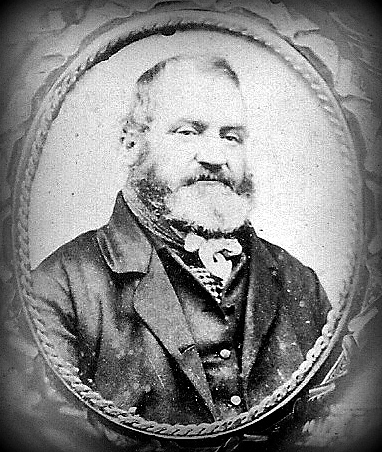
Captain John Parker, Whaling Master.

John Parker (1803–1867) was an English whaling master. He was based at Hull for most of his life, and was one of the most successful and intrepid Arctic whalers to sail from that port in the 19th century. The products of the whaling trade such as oil and whalebone (baleen) were essential to the British economy during this period of the Industrial Revolution and the rigours of life on board a whaleship in the Greenland fisheries produced a particularly hardy and efficient breed of sailor.

== A remarkable career ==
According to the 1861 census form completed when Parker was master of the whaleship Lady Seale, he was born at Grimsby, Lincolnshire. He commenced his seafaring career in 1815 and was a commander by 1831. Never losing a ship, he had no chronometer but relied on dead reckoning to reach his destination. He could also be considered an explorer as in his journeys he would almost certainly have visited places which had not been seen before by anyone other than the indigenous Inuit (or Eskimos as they were then called). Parker's Bay (Baffin Island), 62°28′48″N 64°30′00″W, was named after him. Captain Parker commanded the whale ship Truelove continuously for sixteen years in addition to other vessels such as Emma and Harmony. When captain of the latter ship she was so severely damaged by the ice that he had her hull bound with chains, in which condition he sailed her safely back home to England. An exceptional whaler who, according to William Scoresby, in 1833 caught 28 whales between Cape York and Cape Kater, in Prince Regent Inlet.

== Concern for the Inuit ==
Although a strong disciplinarian, outstanding seaman and navigator Captain Parker could also be considered a man of high principles and generous heart. Shocked by the impoverished condition and starvation of the Inuit inhabitants of Baffin Island as compared to those of Greenland where the Danish authorities treated them humanely, providing shelter and ensuring they had the means to hunt and clothe themselves adequately, in 1847 he brought two young Inuit to Britain in order to publicise their plight, raise money for the purchase of material goods for them, enlist government support for their relief and to persuade the Moravian Church to send a missionary to the region. The Inuit, named Memiadluck and Uckaluk (a 15-year-old orphan), were husband and wife and lived in the Parker home whilst in England where they learned basic household tasks. The captain presented them to the public in various locations, such as Hull, York, the Mechanics' Institute in Manchester and the Moravian community near Manchester and used these exhibitions to obtain donations to buy goods for them to take back to Niatiluk such as rifles, ammunition, utensils, etc. The elders of Trinity House, Hull also presented them with more firearms and tools at a ceremony before they left for their home in the north. The good captain's efforts did not stop there as in 1848 he also addressed a memorial to Queen Victoria through his local M.P. outlining a scheme that would alleviate the misery and destitution of the Inuit settlements worded partly as follows:-

".....Your Majesty's Memorialist has been deeply impressed, from personal observations, with their miserable lot; and with great humility ventures to suggest that the most effectual method of securing their permanent benefit will be to colonise the western side of Davis' Straits, – making Hogarth Sound (Cumberland Sound) the principal stations, – in the manner which has for many years been adopted by the Danish Government on the eastern side, where the natives are comparatively happy and where there is no risk of their being subjected to the horrible calamities which those on the western coast have continually to endure..."

Unfortunately his appeal fell on deaf ears in the Colonial Office, therefore little was achieved in that direction.

Sadly, when the Truelove sailed again for Cumberland Sound Uckaluk (translated into English, a hare) died of measles brought on board by a seaman. She was very attached to Captain Parker, having reportedly said, "Uckaluk no father, no mother; Captain Parker be her father, doctor (the ship's surgeon Mr.Gedney) be her mother." and he had her buried on an island called Kinatuk. A cast of her head, that of her husband Memiadluck and John Parker himself can be seen at the Hull Maritime Museum. Despite several attempts to transfer a Moravian missionary from Greenland this was not achieved, due to weather conditions, until one was eventually brought over directly from Britain some years later.

== The search for Franklin ==
In 1845 Sir John Franklin led an expedition to try to find the North West Passage, but nothing was seen or heard from him or his ships after they left the coast of Baffin Island. Many searches were made for the expedition and, in 1849, Captain Parker brought to England the report made by an Eskimo that he had seen and been on board (in Prince Regent Inlet) Franklin's stranded ships. Unfortunately the thickness of the ice prevented anyone, including Captain Parker, from getting through to investigate the truth of the matter; however, he was able to land a cask of preserved meat and thirty bags of coal sent out by Lady Franklin at Cape Hay on the south shore of Lancaster Sound. The ship's company received £500 for their efforts to find the expedition.

== The jolly sailor ==
Noted for his hospitality, Captain Parker was described by William Parker Snow on a visit to the Truelove as ".....the tout ensemble of a bluff and honest-hearted sailor. Frank and lively he seemed not to know how to make enough of us, or to give us sufficient pleasure in our visit to him.....". He plied his guests with bottled beer, sherry, ham and excellent cheese, etc., and when they left he insisted upon giving them fresh beef, a fine ham and a leg of mutton preserved from the previous March when he had left Hull.

== Final days ==
John Parker retired from the sea about 1862 following a stroke and died at his home in Hull on 12 February 1867. When he was buried in the Sacristy of Sculcoates Cemetery, Hull the flags on board the Truelove and many buildings on the dock quays were flown at half-mast out of respect.
