= Endymion-class frigate =

1797 class of British fifth-rate frigates

Class overview
- Builders: John Randall & Company, Rotherhithe; (Endymion); Wigram, Wells & Green, Blackwall Yard; (Severn, Liffey, Liverpool, Glasgow, & Forth)
- Operators: Royal Navy
- Built: 1795–1814
- In commission: 1797–1859
- Completed: 6

General characteristics
- Type: 40-gun fifth rates, rerated as 50-gun fourth rates in 1817
- Tons burthen: 1,468 11/94 (as designed)
- Length: 159 ft 2 in (48.5 m) on gundeck
- Beam: 41 ft 2 in (12.5 m)
- Draught: 12 ft 4 in (3.8 m)
- Propulsion: Sail
- Speed: 14.4 knots (16.6 mph; 26.7 km/h)
- Complement: 300 (later 340)
- Armament: UD: 26 × 24-pounder guns; 28 × 24-pounder guns; QD: 14 (later 16) × 32-pounder carronades; FC: 2 × 9-pounder guns and 4 × 32-pounder carronades

The Endymion class was a class of six Royal Navy 40-gun fifth-rate frigates, with the prototype launched in 1797 and five slightly amended versions built of fir launched from 1813 to 1814.

== Design ==
In 1794, a frigate squadron under the command of Captain Sir John Borlase Warren captured the French 40-gun frigate Pomone. Surprisingly to her captors, the ship was armed with 26 × 24-pounder long guns, a main armament that was relatively uncommon for frigates in the 18th century. Furthermore, Pomone impressed the British with outstanding sailing qualities in every variation of the wind, and being capable of sailing more than 13 knots (24 km/h; 15 mph).

On 30 April 1795, the Admiralty ordered three frigates – with 36 guns, 38 guns and 40 guns – the first and third built to the lines of the captured French frigate and the second to a new design by the Surveyors (the ship designers of the Royal Navy). The 40-gun French design was copied from Pomone, and in November 1795 the keel was laid down at the Rotherhithe shipyard of John Randall & Company for the new ship, which on 14 November 1795 was named as HMS Endymion. She was launched on 29 March 1797 and towed to Deptford Dockyard, where she was commissioned in April 1797 and completed on 12 June 1797.

Endymion was not an exact copy of Pomone, being built to British design standards with stronger construction. Surprisingly, Endymion sailed even better than Pomone, reaching 14.4 knots (26.7 km/h; 16.6 mph), the highest recorded speed during the Age of Sail. Reclassified as a 48-gun fourth-rate frigate in February 1817, then as 50-gun, and finally as 44-gun in February 1839, Endymion's fine qualities were such that she continued to be praised for nearly half a century. She was finally broken up at Plymouth Dockyard in June 1868.

== 1812 Programme ==
Early in 1812, war with the United States seemed inevitable. To cope with the heavy American 24-pounder frigates of the Constitution-type, the Admiralty decided to build a batch of new 24-pounder frigates. During the long war with France, the standard British frigate was of about 1,000 tons and armed with a main battery of only 18-pounders, no match for the big US ships. The only proven design for a suitable 24-pounder frigate was that of Endymion, and in May 1812 two ships were ordered from Wigram, Wells & Green of Blackwall Yard, who were to construct all five ships eventually built. They differed from the prototype by being constructed of "fir" (actually, pitch pine) rather than oak, and mounted an extra (fourteenth) pair of 24-pounder guns on the upper deck forward. All would be reclassified as 50-gun fourth-rate frigates in February 1817; however, the use of softwood in their construction was such that they were only intended for a short lifetime, and indeed all five were taken to pieces after a few years' service.

The first pair were originally ordered on 4 May 1812 as Tagus and Eridanus of the 18-pounder armed Leda class, but were renamed on 7 January 1813 as Severn and Liffey. The War of 1812 broke out in June, and on 26 December two further ships were ordered, becoming Glasgow and Liverpool. The final ship was Forth, ordered on 7 January 1813. These five new ships were of a slightly modified design, having ports for 28 instead of 26 × 24-pounders and were built of softwood, to speed up the construction. The ships were launched from June 1813 to February 1814.

== Principal characteristics ==
There were small variations in the dimensions of the different ships:

- Length on gundeck: 159 feet 2 inches
- Beam: 41 feet 11 inches
- Tonnage: 1246 to 1277 tons
- Established armament: 28 (Endymion 26) × 24-pounders, 20 × 32-pounder carronades, 2 × 9-pounder chase guns
- Complement: 340 men
- Rated: 40-gun fifth-rates, rerated as 50-gun fourth-rates in 1817.

== List of ships ==
Name	Laid down	Launched	Completed	Notable action and fate
HMS Endymion	November 1795	29 March 1797	12 June 1797	Captured USS President on 15 January 1815; Broken up at Plymouth in June 1868
HMS Severn	January 1813	14 June 1813	11 September 1813	Bombardment of Algiers; Sold for breaking 20 July 1825
HMS Liffey	February 1813	25 September 1813	10 June 1814	First Burmese War; Broken up July 1827
HMS Liverpool	May 1813	21 February 1814	30 June 1814	Sold at Bombay 16 April 1822
HMS Glasgow	May 1813	21 February 1814	26 August 1814	Bombardment of Algiers & Battle of Navarino; Broken up January 1829
HMS Forth	February 1813	14 June 1813	7 September 1813	Broken up at Deptford in October 1819

== Bibliography ==
- Winfield, Rif (2008) [2005]. British Warships in the Age of Sail 1793–1817: Design, Construction, Careers and Fates (2nd revised ed.). Barnsley, UK: Seaforth Publishing. ISBN 978-1-84415-700-6.
- Winfield, Rif (2014). British Warships in the Age of Sail, 1817-1863: Design, Construction, Careers and Fates. Barnsley, UK: Seaforth Publishing. ISBN 978-1-84832-169-4.
