= Sir Charles Price (1815 ship) =

History

United States
- Launched: 1807, 1811, or 1812
- Captured: 1814

United Kingdom
- Name: Sir Charles Price
- Namesake: Sir Charles Price, 1st Baronet
- Acquired: 1814 by purchase of a prize
- Fate: Wrecked April 1833

General characteristics
- Tons burthen: 282, or 284, or 294 (bm)

Sir Charles Price was launched in America in 1812 under another name. The British captured her c.1814 and Daniel Bennett purchased her and added her to his fleet of whalers. She made six complete whaling voyages to the southern whale fishery, and was lost in 1833 on her seventh whaling voyage.

== Career ==
Sir Charles Price first entered Lloyd's Register (LR) in 1815 with Whiteouse, master, Bennett & Sons, owner and trade London–South Seas. Before that, though, she received a special license on 19 July 1814 to sail to the East Indies. She required a special license because she had a burthen of under 350 tons. She underwent repairs in 1815.

1st whaling voyage (1815–1818): Captain Whiteous (or Whiteuse, or Whittens, or Whitehouse) sailed from England on 16 July 1815, bound for Timor. Sir Charles Price returned on 17 February 1818 with 500 casks of whale oil.

2nd whaling voyage (1818–1820): Captain Bristow sailed from England on 30 April 1818. Sir Charles Price returned on 29 March 1820.

3rd whaling voyage (1820–1822): Captain Ford sailed from England on 8 June 1820, bound for the whaling grounds off Peru. On 18 December 1821 Sisters, Earle, master, arrived at Milford Haven. She had left Sir Charles Price "on the Coast" with 1200 barrels. Syren, Coffin, master, Emma, Grand Sachem, and Emerald were also there. (Note: "On the coast" means off Japan.) Sir Charles Price returned to England on 14 June 1822 with 550 casks of whale oil.

4th whaling voyage (1822–1825): Captain John Duncan sailed from England on 26 September 1822, bound for the whaling grounds off Japan. Sir Charles Price was reported at Timor on 19 May 1825 with 1800 barrels of sperm oil. She arrived back at England on 9 September 1825 with 550 casks of whale oil.

5th whaling voyage (1825–1828): Captain May sailed from England on 11 November 1825. Sir Charles Price returned on 30 September 1828 with 330 casks.

6th whaling voyage (1828–1831): Captain Robert Clark Morgan sailed from England on 10 December 1828. Sir Charles Price entered the harbour of Honoruru, Woahoo on 24 April 1830. She was at Tahiti on 21 January 1831. She returned to England on 19 July 1831 with 500 casks.

7th whaling voyage (1831–Loss): Captain Lee sailed from England on 16 October 1831.

== Fate ==
Sir Charles Price was wrecked in April 1833 at Huahine in the Society Islands. Her crew were rescued. She was going into the harbour of Huahine, "for the purpose of refreshing her hands" but a strong current carried her on to the rocks. She had 700 barrels of oil aboard, some of which was saved.

On 17 August Ulitea, Captain Hunter, arrived at Sydney from Raitea with 22 tuns of whale oil and the lower rigging from Sir Charles Price.
