= HMS Martin (1809) =

Sloop of the Royal Navy

History

United Kingdom
- Name: HMS Martin
- Ordered: 26 April 1806
- Builder: David McCallan, Bermuda
- Laid down: 1806
- Launched: May 1809
- Fate: Wrecked 8 December 1817

General characteristics
- Class & type: Bermuda-class sloop
- Tons burthen: 39931/94 (bm)
- Length: Overall:107 ft 0 in (32.6 m); Keel:83 ft 10 5/8 in (25.6 m)
- Beam: 29 ft 11 in (9.1 m)
- Depth of hold: 14 ft 8 in (4.5 m)
- Complement: 121
- Armament: 16 × 24-pounder carronades + 2 × 9-pounder guns
- Notes: Built of Bermuda cedar; all measurements are design

HMS Martin was launched in Bermuda in 1809. Commander John Evans then commissioned her at Halifax Nova Scotia. During the War of 1812, Martin spent much of her time on the Halifax station. She captured or shared in the capture of numerous small merchant vessels. She also captured a small United States privateer, and was involved in an action with United States gunboats. After the war she conducted patrols against smugglers. She was on one of those patrols when she was wrecked in 1817.

== Career ==
On 15 June 1811 Martin was at Deal with a Danish ship that she had detained.

In August Martin detained and sent into the Downs the American vessel Oliver Elsworth, of Wilmington.

On 20 May 1813, Martin, Statira, and Spartan captured the brig Volador, M.Marquez, master. Volador had been carrying a cargo consisting of some boxes of silk, window glass, and specie.

Martin shared with Statira and Spartan in the proceeds of the capture of five vessels. On 30 May 1813 they captured Morning Star and Ploughboy. Ploughboy, R.Ogden, master, had been sailing from the Marrier River to Philadelphia. On 1 June they captured Fanny. Lastly, on 8 June they captured Hetty and Belle. Hetty was a brig of 151 tons (bm), H.Skinner, master. She had been sailing from Madeira to Philadelphia in ballast. Belle, of 105 tons (bm), F.R.Steinhaven, master, was a schooner. She had been sailing from Madeira to Egg Harbour, in ballast.

On 26 May, Curlew and Martin recaptured the brig Thomas and Sally, R.Stocks, master.

Also on 30 May, Statira, Spartan, and Martin captured the brig Commerce, of 185 tons (bm), T. Collinnck, master. She had been on her way from Philadelphia to Gottenburg with 498 bales of cotton and 3000 staves.

On 2 June Statira, Spartan, and Martin captured the brig Flor de Lisboa, F.D.Viena, master. She had been sailing with sugar and rice from Puerto Rico to Philadelphia.

On 12 June Statira, Spartan, and Martin captured the brig Hero, of 165 tons, R.Stanworth, master. She was sailing from Limerick to Lisbon with beef, pork, and provisions.

On 14 June, Statira and Martin detained Carl Gustaf, of 374 tons (bm), G.B.Baker, master. She had been sailing in ballast from New York to Beaufort North Carolina. The Vice Admiralty court returned her to her owners. That same day Statira, Spartan, and Martin captured the schooner Del Carmen, J.Invida, master. She had been sailing from New York to Havana with 405 boxes of soap. the Court returned her to her owners.

On 22 June, Statira, Spartan, and Martin captured the brig Carlotta, J.DaLonza Carvoutha Souza, master. She had been sailing from Puerto Rico to Philadelphia with some money, 48 barrels of rice, and 20 barrels of coffee.

In July 1813 the frigate HMS Junon and Martin were in Delaware Bay. On 29 July at 8 a.m. Martin grounded about 2 1/2 miles from shore. As the tide went out she had to be shored up to present her falling over. The low tide also forced Junon to stay almost two miles away. A flotilla of eight American gun-boats and two block-vessels took advantage of the opportunity to position themselves so as to put Martin between them and Junon. (Note: The block-vessels were former coastal sloops of about 100 ton (bm), each. Their sides had been raised, heavy beams laid across, and the whole planked in, on the top, on each bide, and at the ends. Three gunports on each side held 18-pounder guns. Loopholes for small arms augmented the six gunports. The block-vessels had a complement of 60 men each. The gun-boats were sloop-rigged vessels, averaging about 95 tons (bm). They were armed with a 32-pounder and a 4-pounder gun, on traversing carriages, and had a complement of 35 men.)

The Americans opened fire; Martin returned fire, but her carronades could not reach the Americans, which were over a mile away. Senhouse repositioned his 9-pounder guns, one to the top-gallant forecastle and one to the poop, and returned fire. After about two hours of exchanging fire, Martin at least had sustained no casualties. When the sternmost of the American gunboats separated a little from the rest, 40 men from Martin, in three boats, and 100 men from Junon in four boats, set out and boarded the American. In the attack the British had three men killed or mortally wounded, and four men slightly wounded; the Americans had seven men wounded. (Note: A first class share of the prize money for "Gunboat 121" was worth £15 11s 6d; sixth-class share, that of an Ordinary Seaman, was worth 2s 6 3/4.) The remaining American vessels were in a position to attack Martin, but instead withdrew at around 5 p.m.

On 8 August Martin captured the sloop Louisa, P.Erqunigo, master. Louisa had been sailing from Laguira to Providence with a cargo of hides and indigo.

On 7 October 1813 an American privateer captured Margaret, Dunn, master, of and from St Johns, New Brunswick, and on her way to Martinique. Two days later Martin recaptured Margaret, which then arrived back at St Johns on the 14th.

On 27 November Martin captured the schooner Dove, Benjamin Barber, master, and sent her into St Johns, New Brunswick.

On 8 December Martin captured the schooner Julian, E.Foster, master.

On 13 April 1814, Martin recaptured Hannah, which the American privateer Pike had captured. Hannah, Connelley, master, had been sailing from Demerara to Bermuda with a cargo of rum and molasses. (Note: The Vice Admiralty Court records from Halifax give the year as 1813.)

Lloyd's List reported in July 1814 that Martin had recaptured Mary and sent her into Shelburn. She had been sailing from Greenock to Quebec when she had been captured. Martin had recaptured Mary, Moore, master, on 1 June. She had been sailing with flour from Waterford to Quebec when originally captured.

On 5 June 1814 Martin captured the schooner Magdalena, of 62 tons, J.Nyman, master. She had been sailing from Boston to Halifax with a cargo of 150 barrels of flower and 5 barrels of bread. The court restored her to her owners.

On 30 June 1814 Martin captured the American privateer schooner Snapdragon, of six guns and 80 men, off Hambro Head. Her master was W.R.Graham.

On 11 July, Martin assisted in the British taking possession of Moose island, in Passamaquoddy Bay, which was accomplished without casualties. Martin then returned to Britain.

In October 1814 Commander James Arbuthnot took command. In October 1816, Commander Andrew Mitchell took command on the Cork station.

== Fate ==
On 3 December 1817 Martin sailed from Killybegs Bay on an anti-smuggler patrol. On 7 December she was off the Aran Islands and caught in a full gale. During the night her crew threw guns and shot overboard to lighten her but by morning it was clear that she was being driven towards land. She was driven aground and her masts fell overboard. A swimmer died attempting to get a rope ashore. A boat was lowered, but it was stove in on Martin's side. While the crew waited, unable to do anything else, the winds and sea pushed her onto the beach. All but four men of her crew were able to struggle through the surf to safety. She had wrecked in Mal Bay and the wreck attracted inhabitants from miles around, intent on plundering her.

Newspaper accounts have her foundering in the Atlantic Ocean 8 nautical miles (15 km) off Kilrush, County Clare, with the loss of five of her crew.
