= HCS Vestal (1809) =

Ship owned by the East India Company

History

United Kingdom
- Name: HCS Vestal
- Namesake: Pertaining to the goddess Vesta in Roman mythology
- Operator: British East India Company
- Builder: Bombay Dockyard
- Launched: 1809
- Fate: Condemned 1824

General characteristics
- Tons burthen: 159 (bm)
- Sail plan: Brig
- Armament: 10 or 14 guns; 1825: 6 × 12-pounder carronades + 4 × brass 18-pounder long guns

HCS Vestal was built in 1809 at the Bombay Dockyard for the Bombay Marine, the naval arm of the British East India Company (EIC). She spent much of her career suppressing commerce raiding in the Persian Gulf. Lastly, she figured in a notable action during the First Anglo-Burmese War. She was subsequently condemned as unserviceable and sold for breaking up.

== Career ==
In 1810 Vestal was one of the EIC warships the EIC that supported the British Invasion of Isle de France.

Shortly after 18 November 1816 HMS Challenger and the British East India Company's cruisers HCS Ariel, Mercury, and Vestal sailed from Bushire on a punitive expedition against Ras-al-Khaimah. The squadron attacked on 1 December but could not approach the town closely enough for its fire to effect much damage. The squadron did burn some dhows before it withdrew.

Rear Admiral King appointed Captain Collier of HMS Liverpool to command the naval portion of the 1819 joint navy-army punitive expedition against the Al Qasimi at Ras Al Khaimah. The naval force consisted of the Royal Navy vessels Liverpool, Eden, Curlew, and a number of gun and mortar boats. The Bombay Marine contributed six armed vessels: the 16-gun Teignmouth under the command of Captain Hall, the senior captain, the 16-gun Benares, the 14-gun Aurora, the 14-gun Nautilus, the 12-gun Ariel, and the 12-gun Vestal. Later two frigates and 600 men belonging to Said bin Sultan, Sultan of Muscat and Oman joined the expedition. On the army side, Major General Sir William Keir commanded some 3,000 troops in transports, including the 47th and 65th Regiments, the 1st Battalion of the 2nd Regiment of Native Infantry, the flank companies of the 1st Battalion of the 3rd Regiment of Native Infantry and of the Marine Battalion, and half a company of Pioneers. In all, 1,645 European and 1,424 Indian soldiers ('sepoys') and marines took part in the expedition.

The fleet anchored off Ras Al Khaimah on 2 December, landing troops two miles south of the town on 3 December. Collier placed Captain Walpole of Curlew in charge of the gun boats and an armed pinnace to protect the landing, which was, however, unopposed. The bombardment of the town commenced on 6 December, from landed batteries of 12 pound guns and mortars as well as from sea. On 7 December, two 24-pounder cannons from Liverpool were added to the land batteries. When the troops stormed the town on 9 December they found that the inhabitants had all fled. The siege cost the British five dead and 52 men wounded. The Arabs reportedly had lost a thousand dead.

In 1821 Vestal fired on Doha, setting fire to the town and forcing its inhabitants to flee. The cause was Buhar bin Jurban of the Al bu-Aynayn tribe having breached an 1819 treaty between the British and a number of Gulf sheiks who agreed not to harbour pirates. It is not clear that bin Jurban was aware of the treaty, let alone a signatory.

Vestal distinguished herself in one notable action during the First Anglo-Burmese War. On 4 June 1824 Vestal, under the command of Lieutenant James W. Guy, was off Shahporee Island at the mouth of the Naaf River, together with two gunboats, each armed with one 12-pounder carronade. A fleet of 100 Burmese war-boats came out of Mungdoo Creek. The boats were full of men and were armed with guns. They called on the British to surrender. Guy responded with a broadside. After about 10 minutes the Burmese retreated back up the creek, pursued by the two gunboats firing canister as they went. Vestal fired on some boats at Shahporee Island and a stockade. In all, the British estimated that they had destroyed some 14 boats and inflicted 150 casualties. On 7 June Vestal and the gunboats sailed for Chittagong.

== Fate ==
Not long after the action at Shahporee Island Vestal was declared unserviceable and sold for breaking up.
