= Cumbrian (1811 ship) =

British merchantman and whaler 1811–1844

History

United Kingdom
- Name: Cumbrian
- Namesake: Cumbria
- Owner: Wright, Brandon & Co.(1819)
- Builder: Quintin Blackburn, South Shields
- Launched: 24 January 1803
- Fate: Condemned 14 September 1814

General characteristics
- Tons burthen: 374, or 375 (bm)
- Complement: 50 (1834)
- Armament: 1813: 8 × 18-pounder carronades; 1816:2 × 6-pounder guns + 8 × 18-pounder carronades

Cumbrian was launched at Shields in 1811. Initially, during the last years of the Napoleonic Wars, Cumbrian was a transport. After the end of the war she became a West Indiaman. In 1817 she made one voyage to Bengal, sailing under a licence from the British East India Company (EIC). In 1819 she became a whaler, sailing from Kingston upon Hull to the northern whale fishery (Greenland (Gr) and Davis Strait (DS)). From 1835 on she left whaling and started trading more widely, to North America, Bombay, and Africa. She was driven ashore in August 1844, refloated, and subsequently condemned.

== Career ==
Cumbrian first appeared in the Register of Shipping (RS) in 1811.

Year	Master	Owner	Trade	Source & Notes
1811	T.Smith	Blackburn	Shields transport	RS
1816	T.Smith	Blackburn	Shields transport London–Jamaica	RS

Cumbrian, Smith, master, was reported to have arrived at Jamaica on 2 May 1816. She was back at Deal on 13 February 1817, and Gravesend two days later.

In 1813 the EIC had lost its monopoly on the trade between India and Britain. British ships were then free to sail to India or the Indian Ocean under a license from the EIC.

In 1817 Cumbrian, J.Brodie, master, sailed to Fort William, India under a licence from the EIC. She sailed from Deal on 29 May 1817, bound for Bengal. On 8 July she stopped at Tenerife and the next day resumed her voyage. Prior to 12 June 1818 she was at the Cape of Good Hope, having come from Bengal. She was off Dover on 3 September.

Cumbrian first appeared in Lloyd's Register (LR) in 1818.

Year	Master	Owner	Trade	Source & Notes
1818	T.Smith	Blackburn	London–Jamaica	LR
1819	T.Smith; Johnson	Blackburn; Wright & Co.	London–Jamaica; Hull–Davis Strait	LR; large repair 1819

From 1819 to 1835 Cumbrian sailed from Hull as a whaler, hunting whales at Greenland or Davis Strait. The data in the table below is from Coltish.

Year	Master	Grounds	"Fish" (Whales)	Tuns whale oil
1819	Johnson	DS	5	64
1820	Johnson	DS	13	177
1821	Johnson	Gr	28	214 (+12 tons of bone
1822	Johnston	DS	8	102

On 26 June 1822, ice crushed Lady Forbes; all the crew survived. Captain William Manger, of Lady Forbes transferred to Cumbrian. On the following Sunday, Captain Johnson asked Manger to raise the Bethel Flag and conduct a prayer service for the seamen from all the nearby whalers.

Year	Master	Owner	Trade	Source & Notes
1823 (Note: Lubbock has a detailed list of all 23 whales taken, complete with their measurements.)	Johnston	DS	23	236
1824	Johnston	DS	6	85
1825	Johnston	DS	6	70
1826	Munro	DS	3	40
1827	Munroe (Note: Lubbock reproduces the content of Cumbrian's logbook for 10–15 August 1827. On Saturday, 11 August, she killed three whales. The next three days were taken up with removing the flesh, and the three days after that with taking off the blubber. In all, the three whales yielded 123 butts of blubber. Cambrian was the best fished ship of the season. At the time it was believed that this was the largest cargo in the annals of Arctic whaling.)	DS	18	264, or 280
1828	Munroe	DS	16.5	264
1829	Munroe	DS	11	149
1830	Munroe	DS	0 (clean)	0
1831	Munroe	DS	1	12
1832	Munroe	Gr	3	39
1833 (Note: Although Cumbrian was not the best fished ship, she was a full ship.)	Dring, Jr.	DS	25	275
1834	Dring, Jr.	DS	5	61 (48 tuns train oil + 150 butts blubber, 2 tons of fins)
1835	Dring, Jr.	DS	0 or 1	

Cumbrian ceased whaling in 1835. In her some 17 years in the trade she had averaged about 10 fish a year, for a total take of a little more than 170 whales.

Year	Master	Owner	Trade	Source & Notes
1835	R.Dring	Wright & Co.	Hull–"N.W.F." (Northern Whale Fishery)	LR; large repair 1821 & 1826, and small repair 1831
1839	R.Dring	Wright & Co.	Liverpool–Petersburg; Hull	LR; large repair 1821 & 1826, small repair 1834, damages repaired 1837 & 1838, and large repair 1840
1840	R.Dring	Wright & Co.	Hull; London–Bombay	LR; large repair 1821 & 1826, small repair 1834, damages repaired 1837 & 1838, and large repair 1840
1844	R.Dring	Wright & Co.	Hull	LR; large repair 1826 & 1840

On 12 January 1843 Cumbrian sailed for Madras and Bengal. She put back four days later with the loss of her sails and quarter-boat, and with one man having been washed overboard. On 22 September she sailed from Calcutta for London.

== Fate ==
Cumbrian was driven ashore on 28 August 1844. She was refloated seventeen day later and resumed her voyage to Sierra Leone. She arrived on 2 October and was condemned. LR for 1844 carried the annotation "Condemned" by her name.
