= Forbes (1805 ship) =

British India-built merchant and privateer ship 1805–1806

History

United Kingdom
- Name: Forbes
- Owner: Forbes & Co. (Note: John Forbes of Aberdeenshire, Scotland, established Forbes & Co. in Bombay in 1767. The Tata Group acquired it, and then the Shapoorji Pallonji Group acquired it.)
- Builder: Michael Smith, Calcutta
- Launched: 15 January 1805
- Fate: Wrecked on 11 September 1806

General characteristics
- Tons burthen: 340 (bm)

Forbes was launched at Calcutta in 1805. She was wrecked in the Billeton Straits in the southern part of the Karimata Strait on 11 September 1806. (Note: Elsewhere Phipps gives the date as 11 April, not 11 September.)

== Career ==
Forbes sailed under the command of Frazer Sinclair. She traded on the coast of India and between India and the Malay archipelago. In late 1806 Sinclair engaged in privateering.

On 6 September 1806, Lord Forbes was westward of the east coast of Madura Island when she encountered the Dutch frigate Phoenix, which was sailing from Batavia to Sourabaya. Sinclair hoisted American colours and sailed within point blank range of Phoenix, which fired a few shots, but without effect. (Note: Phoenix, of 32 guns, had been launched at Rotterdam on 4 May 1799. Rear-Admiral Sir Edward Pellew, led a force of four ships of the line, two frigates and brig to Batavia. Her crew scuttled Phoenix at the British approach. Pellew set fire to her as he sailed off at the end of his Raid on Batavia (1806).)

On 7 September, Forbes captured a Dutch brig sailing from Batavia to Sourabaya. The following day Forbes captured two more Dutch vessels. Sinclair put a prize crew of 16 men on one of these two vessels, under the command of his second mate, Mr. Hitchins, with orders to cruise in search of more prizes.

== Loss ==
On 11 September, after Forbes had run aground and become stranded on a reef, the crew took to her boats to free her before she was scuttled. They were unsuccessful and she eventually slipped off the reef and sank. At dawn the 78 European officers and men, and lascars took to her boats. The pinnace held Sinclair, the 4th mate and 11 crew. One longboat held the 1st and 3rd officers and 27 crew. The second longboat held 40 crew. There is some uncertainty about five Javanese who had been in the brig taken in prize. They may have refused to leave the wreck, or may have been divided among the boats.

On 19 September, the pinnace encountered General Baird, Harford, master, which furnished the men in the pinnace with supplies. The pinnace arrived at Malacca on 22 September. The longboat with the other Europeans arrived on 25 September. It is not clear what happened to the second longboat with the lascars.

On 22 October, a Dutch snow arrived at Penang under the command of Mr. Hitchins. He had captured her and then transferred her crew and his other prisoners to the brig of the ship in which he had been sailing, taking over the snow. She was larger and had a cargo worth 14–15,000 dollars.

Later, Sinclair would become master of several vessels, including Emma and Lady Rollo.
