= Emma (1808 ship) =

United Kingdom
- Name: Emma
- Namesake: Emma, daughter of builder Michael Smith
- Owner: 1812: T. Ward & Co.; 1848:Bews & Co.; 1851:Wilson & Co.; 1854:Mills; 1857:Ward
- Builder: Michael Smith, Howrah, Calcutta
- Launched: 25 November 1808, or 1809
- Fate: Foundered April 1864

General characteristics
- Tons burthen: 379 (New measurement), or 416, or 440, or 463, or 463 17/94, or 463 57/94, or 550, (bm)
- Length: 1808:108 ft 0 in (32.9 m); 1864:100 ft 0 in (30.5 m)
- Beam: 1808: 31 ft 3 in (9.5 m); 1864: 28 ft 5 in (8.7 m)
- Complement: 53 (1864)
- Armament: 2 × 9-pounder chase guns + 10 × 18-pounder carronades
- Notes: Teak-built

Emma was a merchant vessel launched at Calcutta in 1809 that in 1810 served as a government armed ship in the British invasion of Île de France. In 1811 she sailed to England where she was sold. She then became a transport and later a whaler. Between 1815 and 1853 she made 11 whaling voyages. She was then sold and became a merchantman on the England-Australia run. Between 1851 and 1853 she made one more whaling voyage to the South Seas fisheries. She then returned to the England-Australia trade. In 1857 her home port became Hull, and she became a Greenland whaler, though that role may have begun as early as 1855. She was converted in 1864 to a screw steamer but was lost in April while seal hunting.

== Career ==
Initially, Emma was under the command of Captain Frazer Sinclair, trading between Calcutta, Bombay, and Madras. (Note: Earlier, Sinclair had been master of several vessels, including Forbes. Later, he was master of several vessels, including Lady Rollo.)

=== Government armed ship ===
In 1810 Emma participated in the British invasion of Île de France as a "government armed ship" under the command of Lieutenant Street. Her cannons came from Windham.

Because she had served as a hired armed vessel and not just as a transport, Emma was entitled to share in the prize money for the campaign. (Note: A first-class share was worth £278 19s 5 3/4d; a sixth-class share, that of an ordinary seaman, was worth £3 7s 6 1/4d. A fourth and final payment was made in July 1828. A first-class share was worth £29 19s 5 1/4d; a sixth-class share was worth 8s 2 1/2d.)

The British government chartered Emma and eight other vessels as cartels to carry back to France the French troops that they had captured in these campaigns. Emma took on board General Decaen (the former governor of Mauritius), his family, and suite, sailing on 24 December 1810. She sailed via the Cape, which she reached in January 1811.

=== Merchantman ===
In August 1811, presumably after her return from England, she was sold to Fairlie, Ferguson, & Co., of Calcutta, who appointed A.G.Noyes as her master.

Emma sailed to England again. She was admitted to the Registry of Great Britain on 20 February 1812. She entered Lloyd's Register (LR).

Year	Master	Owner	Trade	Source
1812	J.Jackson	T.Ward	London transport	LR
1815	J.Jackson; D.Porter	T.Ward	London transport London–South Seas	LR

=== South Seas whaler ===
Whaling voyage #1 (1815-1816): Emma, Porter, master, sailed from England on 14 March 1815, bound for the Brazil Banks. (Note: The Brazil Banks are the edge of the continental shelf to the east and south of latitude 16°S of the coast of South America.) She returned on 2 July 1816 with 600 casks, plus "fins".

Year	Master	Owner	Trade	Source
1816	D.Porter; J.Cripps; Jarwood	T.Ward	London–South Seas	LR

Whaling voyage #2 (1816-1818): Emma, Captain Jarwood (or Garwood), sailed from England on 5 September, bound for the Pacific Ocean. On 18 March 1817 she was "all well" off Patagonia. She returned to England on 26 February 1818, a "full ship". She had taken 40 whales, which yielded her 500 casks, and fins.

Whaling voyage #3 (1818-1819): Captain Riddle sailed from England on 6 July, and returned on 9 October 1819. Emma returned with 550 casks, and fins.

Whaling voyage #4 (1820-1823): Captain Gulliver sailed from England on 1 February 1820, bound for Timor. On 18 December 1821 Sisters, Earle, master, arrived at Milford Haven. She had left Emma "on the Coast" with Syren, Coffin, master, Sir Charles Price, Grand Sachem, and Emerald. (Note: "On the coast" means off Japan.) On 29 November 1822 Emma lost a boat and six men at 4°N 19°W. She returned on 11 January 1823 with 420 casks (200 tons).

Whaling voyage #5 (1823-1825): Captain Riddell (or Riddle) sailed from England on 27 June, bound for Delagoa Bay. Emma was reported on 13 July 1824 to have come to the Cape of Good Hope from Delagoa Bay with Riddell, his Chief Mate, and a number of seamen dead, and the crew ill. She was carrying 140 tons oil. Captain Walters replaced Riddell. Emma was again at the Cape, on 24 June, having come in from whaling. At some point she embarked the crew of Udny, which had wrecked on 2 July at Inhambane Bay, Mozambique, on her passage from Calcutta and Madras for London. Emma carried the crew to Saint Helena. Emma returned to England on 16 March 1825. She was carrying 520 casks, and fins.

In 1825 Emma received repairs to her copper sheathing. Lloyd's Register carried a notation that Emma's teak sheathing was badly wormed.

Whaling voyage #6 (1825-1827): Captain Stephen Reynolds sailed from England and was at the Cape on 9 April 1826. Emma returned to England on 11 May 1827 with only 200 casks.

Whaling voyage #7 (1827-1831): Captain Reynolds sailed from England on 29 August, bound for the Sandwich Islands. By March 1828 Emma was at Honolulu. On 26 1830 she was off the coast of California, and on 24 August she was at Coquimbo. She returned to England on 5 March 1831 with 2200 barrels or more.

Whaling voyage #8 (1831-1834): Captain Goodman sailed from England on 17 May, bound for the Seychelles. Emma was reported to have been there in mid-July 1832. She stopped at Praslin in 1833. On 11 April 1834 she was at 40°N 27°W (about 50 miles north of the Azores). She returned to England on 7 May with 2700 barrels or more.

Whaling voyage #9 (1834-1838): Captain Goodman sailed from England on 4 August, again bound for the Seychelles. Emma was at Praslin on 25 June 1825, but with only 400 barrels.

On 12 August 1836 Tiger wrecked on Astorva Island (10.098°S 47.7474°E) while sailing from Bombay to Liverpool. Her captain committed suicide on 16 August. Twelve crew sailed for Mahé, Seychelles on 18 September in the ship's long boat and were never again seen. Emma rescued the remaining thirteen passengers and crew on 14 October. Emma took the people she had rescued to Mahé, arriving there on 1 November.

Goodman then sailed to Sydney, Australia, and from there to the coast of Sumatra. Emma returned to England on 23 March 1838 with 250 tons of oil.

Whaling voyage #10 (1838-1842): Captain Goodman sailed to Timor in 1838. When Emma returned she had only 78 tons of oil.

Whaling voyage #11 (1843-1847): Captain Elbourne (or J. Aberdeen) sailed on 9 January 1843. She was at Tahiti from 8 to 16 November, Ponape on 5 April 1844 and at Lahaina, Hawaii, on 24 October. She returned to England on 11 May 1847 with 82 tons of oil.

Around the end of her voyage Ward sold Emma. She disappears and reappears in Lloyd's Register with a variety of masters, owner, and trades.

=== Merchant vessel and whaler ===
Year	Master	Owner	Trade	Notes
1847				No entry
1848	T. Knight	Bews & Co.	London–Sydney, Australia	Small repairs 1848
1851				No entry

Whaling voyage #12 (1851-1853): Emma's owner was Wilson & Co. Captain J. Davies sailed from England on 7 January 1851. On 10 November Emma was off the Curia Maria Islands (17°33′N 56°06′E) (SE coast of Oman). She then was reported to have sailed from Table Bay for the South Seas. She returned to England on 8 October 1853 with 90 casks.

Merchant vessel: Emma reappeared in Lloyd's Register in 1854 with W. Mills, master, Wilson & Co., owner, and trade London–Australia. This entry continued into 1855 and 1856, though in 1856 she had no trade.

=== Greenland whaler ===
One source states that Emma had wintered over 1855-1856 at Goodhavn. She was by then, therefore, already a Greenland whaler.

Lloyd's Register for 1857 reported that Emma's owner was again T. Ward, and that she had undergone damage repairs in 1856. Her home port was Hull, her master was J(ohn) Parker, and her trade was now Hull–Davis Strait. In 1859 her trade was Hull–Greenland. The source for the information about Goodhavn wrote a memoir. In it he described two whaling voyages between 1857-1859 when he was mate aboard Emma.

In 1858 Emma was ice-bound in Melville Bay. The crew of Gypsey, which the ice had crushed, were able to reach Emma. After about a week the ice opened and Emma was able to sail out. She sailed southward where she found some other whalers anchored to the ice. Parker then dispersed Gypsey's crew among the vessels.

== Fate ==
From 1862 on Ward was no longer listed as owner, and her home port was no longer listed as Hull. However, her trade was still listed as Hull–Greenland until the 1864 issue of Lloyd's Register. Apparently, a Dundee shipping firm had purchased Emma in 1863. In 1863 her master was Nichol, of Dundee.

A report in January 1864 stated that Emma, of Dundee, Messrs. Gilroy, owners, was in dock. She was undergoing refitting inside and out, and was being fitted with a 50HP steam engine built by Messrs. Gourlay.

Emma, Captain Gravill, left the docks on 10 March and Dundee two days later to engage in sealing. On 17 March she stopped at Lerwick to gather more crew. The Dundee Advertiser reported on 16 May that Emma, one the Dundee fleet of screw whalers, was lost at 70°10′N 14°00′W (about 130 miles WSW of Jan Mayen), on 15 April. She had developed a leak that the pumps could not handle and the crew had to abandon ship. The crew took to her boats and were rescued by the Norwegian whaler Elise, Gunnar, master.

The 1864 volume of Lloyd's Register carries the notation "Lost" against Emma's name.
