= Sir Andrew Snape Hammond (1802) =

19th century merchant ship

United Kingdom
- Name: Sir Andrew Snape Hammond
- Namesake: Sir Andrew Hamond, 1st Baronet
- Owner: Various
- Builder: M. Smith, Howrah, Calcutta
- Launched: 1802, or 1803
- Renamed: Udny (or Udney)
- Captured: 1807
- Fate: Wrecked 1824

General characteristics
- Tons burthen: 469, or 46984/94, or 480, or 490, or 500 (bm)
- Length: 116 ft 6 in (35.5 m)
- Beam: 30 ft 9 in (9.4 m)

Sir Andrew Snape Hammond was a merchant vessel launched at Calcutta in 1802. By 1807, her name had changed to Udny (or Udney). In 1807, the French captured her, but she eventually returned to non-French ownership and Calcutta registry. She was wrecked in 1824.

== Career ==
In 1803, Sir Andrew Snape Hammond's owner was S. Teague.

It is not clear when Sir Andrew Snape Hammond was renamed Udny.

The French frigate Piémontaise captured Udny on 2 October 1807. At the time the name of her master was Walteas or Wallis. Udny (or Adny) was carrying a cargo of saltpeter, wine, grain, and 5,625 sacks of rice. The value of the prize was 201,316.54 French francs.

It is not clear how or when Udny returned to Calcutta registry, though it is clear that she did.

| Year | Master | Owner |
|---|---|---|
| 1819 | A. Pelly | Sheik Goulam Hussein |
| 1821 | T. Woody | Sheik Goulam Hussein |

== Loss ==
Lloyd's List reported on 17 December 1824, that Udney, Holden, master, had been sighted off Île Bourbon on 29 May 1824, whilst on a voyage from Bengal to London. At the time of the report there had been no further trace, and so she was presumed foundered with the loss of all hands. Actually, Udney, Houlding, master, had wrecked at Inhambane Bay, Mozambique, on her passage from Calcutta and Madras for London.

She had sprung a leak on 15 June, while she was off Natal, but had gotten into Delagoa Bay on the 19th. On the 21st she had been blown out of the Bay, resulting in her wreck on 2 July. Her crew and passengers were saved, and the whaler Emma carried them to Saint Helena. Some pepper and cardamums of Udny's cargo had been saved too. Sixty-five cases of cardamums and 235 bags of pepper were sold at Mozambique for the benefit of the underwriters.
