= Lady Rollo (1810 ship) =

India-built UK merchant ship 1810–1813

History

United Kingdom
- Name: Lady Rollo
- Launched: Calcutta October 1810
- Fate: Wrecked 13 September 1813

General characteristics
- Tons burthen: 120, or 125 (bm)
- Sail plan: Brig
- Notes: Teak-built

Lady Rollo was launched at Calcutta in 1810. She was a country ship, trading east of the Cape of Good Hope, primarily between Calcutta and the islands of the Malay Archipelago, such as Java.

Loss: On 13 September 1813 Lady Rollo, Pringle, master, grounded on a shoal 40 miles (64 km) south southeast from Flores Head. The crew were unable to get her off and she bilged and was lost. Her crew took to her boat and Captain Sinclair, the supercargo, set her on fire. On 20 September they reached Bima where the Rajah declined to assist them. A local Chinese merchant who provided them with a proa. They arrived at Bisuki on 12 October.

Earlier, Frazer Sinclair had been captain of Forbes when she was wrecked, and of Emma.
