= Paragon (1813 ship) =

History

United States
- Name: Paragon
- Owner: John Peters
- Builder: C.Turner, Medford, Massachusetts
- Launched: 1813
- Commissioned: 6 July 1813
- Captured: 1813

General characteristics
- Tons burthen: 157 (bm)
- Sail plan: Schooner
- Complement: 20 (at capture)
- Armament: 2 × 12-pounder + 2 × 9-pounder guns (at capture)

Paragon was launched at Medford, Massachusetts in 1813. She was commissioned (acquired her letter of marque), and then captured later that year.

Capture: On 14 August 1813, HMS Nymphe's yawl (armed with a carronade), and supported by HMS Curlew's boats, chased a schooner for eight hours off Cape Cod, in little wind, before they captured her. The schooner was the letter-of-marque Paragon, of 157 tons burthen, 20 men, and pierced for 16 guns but carrying four, two 12-pounders and two 9-pounders.

Paragon was under the command of Captain Warren Weston. She had been sailing from Charlestown to Boston when she was captured. Her cargo consisted of 178 bales of cotton, and 146 barrels and 34 half-barrels of rice. Her captors sent Paragon to Halifax, Nova Scotia, and the Vice admiralty court there condemned her in prize.
