= Lady Forbes (1799 ship) =

History

Great Britain
- Name: Lady Forbes
- Owner: 1799: William Sibbald & Son (Note: The firm was involved in the West Indian sugar and rum trade. In addition to Lady Forbes, the firm owned Isabella Simpson, Roselk, Lune, and some other vessels. The firm went out of business circa 1826. Isabella Simpson was lost in July 1834.)
- Launched: 1799, Leith
- Fate: Crushed by ice 22 June 1822

General characteristics
- Tons burthen: 335, or 337 (bm)
- Complement: 1799: 30; 1805: 35; 1811: 30; 1812: 50
- Armament: 1799: 6 × 6-pounder guns + 4 × 12-pounder + 4 × 18-pounder carronades; 1805: 4 × 6-pounder guns + 4 × 18-pounder carronades; 1808: 2 × 6-pounder guns; 1811: 10 × 6-pounder guns + 6 × 18-pounder carronades; 1812: 4 × 6 & 4 × 9-pounder guns + 12 × 18-pounder carronades

Lady Forbes was launched at Leith in 1799. She became a West Indiaman, sailing under a series of letters of marque. She survived a major hurricane and an attack by pirates. From 1819, she was a whaler in the British northern whale fishery. She made three annual whaling voyages before she was lost in 1822 when ice crushed her.

== Career ==
Lady Forbes first appeared in Lloyd's Register (LR) in 1799.

Year	Master	Owner	Trade	Source & notes
1799	T.Bishop	Sibbald	Leith–Petersburg	LR
1800	T.Bishop; Gourlay	Sibbald	Leith–Petersburg; Leith–Jamaica	LR

Captain David Gourlay acquired a letter of marque on 25 December 1799. After the resumption of war with France he acquired a new letter of marque on 21 January 1805.

Between 21 and 23 August, Lady Forbes survived the 1806 Great Coastal hurricane. She was part of the Jamaica fleet, 109 merchantmen plus escorts, returning to England. Of the 109 vessels, by October five vessels of the 109 in the convoy were still unaccounted for, though only 13 were known to have sunk. The seventy crew on the vessels known to have been lost were drowned.

Year	Master	Owner	Trade	Source & notes
1808	D.Gourlay (Note: Gourlay went on to become the manager of the Old Shipping Company of London and Leith.); J.Richardson	Sibbald	Leith–Jamaica	LR; repairs 1806 & 1807
1810	J.Richardson; A.Nelson	Sibbald	Leith–Jamaica	LR; repairs 1806 & 1807

On 25 January 1811, Lady Forbes, of Leith, Nelson, master, was driven ashore at Annotto Bay, Jamaica. After she unloaded part of her cargo she was gotten off without any damage.

Year	Master	Owner	Trade	Source & notes
1812	A.Nelson; D.M'Vicar	Sibbald	Leith–Jamaica	LR; repairs 1807 & 1810

Captain M'Vicar died at Morrant Bay. Captain William Wight acquired a letter of marque on 19 December 1811. He acquired a second one on 1 December 1812.

Year	Master	Owner	Trade	Source & notes
1813	D.M'Vicar; M.Wright	Sibbald	Leith–Jamaica	LR; repairs 1810 & 1812
1815	W.Wright; Robinson	Sibbald	Leith–Jamaica	LR; repairs 1810 & 1812
1816	Robinson; Marjoribanks	Sibbald	Leith–Jamaica	LR; repairs 1810 & 1812

On 2 February 1817, pirates in two schooners boarded Lady Forbes off San Domingo. They plundered her of her firearms, cutlasses, and powder. She was on her way from Jamaica to Leith.

On 12 September 1817, Lady Forbes, Marjoribanks, master, arrived at New York City from Leith, with passengers. From New York she sailed on to Jamaica.

Year	Master	Owner	Trade	Source & notes
1818	Marjoribanks	Sibbald	London–New York	LR; repairs 1819
1819	Marjoribanks; Robertson	Sibbald	London–New York	LR; repairs 1812 & 1819
1820	Robertson	Hurry & Co.	London–Greenland	LR

In 1819, Hurry & Co. purchased Lady Forbes, which became a northern whale fishery whaler sailing out of Liverpool. That year she was the only whaler operating out of Liverpool. In 1820, Baffin and James joined her. The whaling season lasted from February–March to July–October. Between whaling seasons, Lady Forbes sailed to Archangel or New Brunswick. In 1819 and 1820, Lady Forbes hunted whales in the waters off Greenland. In 1821, Captain William Manger replaced Captain Robertson; under Manger, Lady Forbes hunted whales in Davis Strait.

Year	Master	Whales	Tuns of whale oil	Seals	Source
1819	Robertson	13			Lloyd's List (LL)
1819		13	124		Coltish
1820		10	110		LL
1820		11	125		Coltish
1820		11	186	350	
1821	Manger	8	86		Coltish
1821	Manger	8	110		LL

Another source reports that in 1821, Lady Forbes had boiled 200 tons of oil.

== Fate ==
Ice crushed Lady Forbes on 26 June 1822, while she was whaling in Davis Strait. Her crew was saved.

The day before, several vessels were made fast to ice flows at 72°5'N. The next day a small channel opened. Brunswick managed to get through. Lady Forbes tried, but the ice came back, crushing her. Her crew barely had time to save their clothes. Captain William Manger shifted to Cumbrian, Johnson, master. On her on Sunday he raised the Bethel Flag, the first time it had been raised in Davis Strait, and conducted a prayer service for the seamen from all the nearby whalers.

Lady Forbes was one of seven whalers lost that year.
