= Grace (1811 ship) =

History

United Kingdom
- Name: Grace
- Owner: Bond & Co.; 1815:M. Boyd; 1822:Buckles & Co.
- Builder: Ipswich, Suffolk, England
- Launched: 1811
- Fate: Destroyed by fire 1822

General characteristics
- Type: Full-rigged ship
- Tons burthen: 245, or 250 (bm)
- Propulsion: Sail
- Complement: 17
- Armament: 1812:10 × 9-pounder guns; 1815:4 × 4-pounder guns + 10 × 9-pounder carronades (RS); 1822:4 guns

Grace was launched at Ipswich in 1811. She spent most of her career sailing to South America. However, she was returning to Britain from New South Wales in 1822 when a fire that started in her cargo destroyed her.

== Career ==
Grace entered Lloyd's Register (LR) in 1812 with Smith, master, changing to J. Kerr, and Bond & co., owner. Later, the British East India Company licensed her to travel east of the Cape of Good Hope.

Year	Master	Owner	Trade	Source
1815	J.Kerr; Salmon	M.Boyd	London–Rio de Janeiro	Register of Shipping (RS)
1820	J.Kerr	M.Boyd	London–Malta	RS
1822	Letbridge	M.Boyd	London–New South Wales	RS
1822	Lethbridge	Buckle & Co.	London–Van Diemen's Land	LR

Grace, Lethbridge, master, left Cowes on 20 April 1821 with merchandise and passengers. On 11 July she struck some rocks coming into port at Hobart, Van Diemen's Land, although she was under the control of a pilot. She could not be gotten off until she was lightened. She arrived in the Derwent on 10 August. She was not holed and by 1 September she had completed her repairs and was again ready for the sea.

== Loss ==
Grace was under the command of Captain Robert Lethbridge when she left Sydney on 19 February 1822 carrying a cargo of whale oil and wool. During the journey, which took 14 weeks, gales badly battered Grace; the oil sprung a leak and saturated the wool, which with the movement eventually spontaneously combusted. Grace was in sight of Simon's Bay at the time the fire was discovered. While five men stayed on board to fight the fire, douse the hatches and keep them sealed, the remaining passengers and crew stood off in a longboat, towed behind Grace. However, the crew were unable to keep the fire under control and as she neared Struys Bay (34°48′16″S 20°03′27″E), she burst into flames. The remaining crew were taken on the longboat and the tow was cut. Grace grounded and burned down to the water line. The passengers and crew reached the shore without harm and six days later made it overland to Cape Town.

While most of the mail was lost, dispatches from Governor Macquarie were saved and for doing so, Captain Lethbridge was awarded 1,000 acres (4.0 km^{2}) at Bridgeman, near Singleton, when he settled in New South Wales in 1825. Twenty-one barrels of oil and 38 bales of cotton drifted ashore.
