= Francis Collier =

British admiral (1786–1849)

Rear-Admiral Sir Francis Collier CB KCH
- Born: 7 August 1785; Ireland
- Died: 28 October 1849 (aged 63); Hong Kong
- Military career
- Allegiance: United Kingdom
- Branch: Royal Navy
- Service years: 1794 – 1849
- Rank: Royal Navy Rear-Admiral
- Conflicts: French Revolutionary Wars; Battle of the Nile; Napoleonic Wars; Invasion of Martinique; Persian Gulf campaign of 1819
- Awards: Knight Bachelor, Companion of the Order of the Bath, Knight Commander of the Royal Guelphic Order

Rear-Admiral Sir Francis Augustus Collier, CB, KCH (7 August 1785 – 28 October 1849) was a senior officer of the British Royal Navy during the early nineteenth century. Born into a naval family, Collier served in the French Revolutionary Wars and fought at the Battle of the Nile on Horatio Nelson's flagship. During the Napoleonic Wars he was engaged in campaigns in the West Indies and in 1819 he commanded an operation against pirates in the Persian Gulf. He remained in service for the next thirty years, holding several commands before his death in 1849 as commander of the China Squadron at Hong Kong.

== Early life ==
Collier was born on 7 August 1785 in Ireland and baptised in Wandsworth 16 September the same year, the son of Admiral Sir George Collier and his wife Elizabeth Fryer. In 1794 he entered the Royal Navy aged 11 and served with the Channel Fleet for several years before being transferred to the Mediterranean to serve aboard Admiral Horatio Nelson's flagship HMS Vanguard. In 1798, Vanguard and Collier were engaged at the Battle of the Nile, and he subsequently moved with Nelson to HMS Foudroyant, serving aboard until 1802 and the Peace of Amiens.

== Command ==
In 1803 he was promoted to Lieutenant and in 1805 to Commander. Between 25 October 1805 and 15 January 1806 he commanded Nimrod in the Caribbean.

=== Pearl Rock and Martinique ===
On 12 December 1808, Commander Collier was captain of Circe was in charge of a squadron that included Stork, Epervier and Express. The vessels joined to attack the French 16-gun brig Cygne and two schooners off Saint-Pierre, Martinique. Circe sent in her boats, which the French repelled, causing 56 casualties, dead, wounded and missing.

That evening Amaranthe, under the command of Captain Edward Pelham Brenton, joined Circe and Stork. The next day fire from Amaranthe compelled the crew of Cygne to abandon her and Amaranthe's boats boarded and destroyed the French vessel. For her part Amaranthe lost one man killed and five wounded due to fire from batteries on the shore. One schooner was run ashore and destroyed.

Amaranthe's boats, assisted by boats from the schooner Express, boarded the second schooner and set fire to her too. This expedition cost Amaranthe her sailing master, Joshua Jones, who was severely wounded. The other British vessels that contributed boats also had casualties. Including the losses in the earlier fighting before Amaranthe arrived, the British had lost some 12 men killed, 31 wounded, and 26 missing (drowned or prisoners) for little gain. Brenton was promoted to Post-captain soon after the battle, with the promotion being back dated to 13 December, the date of the battle. In 1847 the Admiralty authorized the award of the Naval General Service Medal with the clasp "OFF THE PEARL ROCK 13 DECR. 1808".

For his part in this action, Collier received a promotion to post captain, with the confirmation back-dating the promotion to 13 December 1808. As a result, he was still a commander in 1809 when as captain of Starr he participated in the invasion of Martinique. In 1847 the Admiralty authorized the award of the Naval General Service Medal with clasp "Martinique" to all surviving claimants from the campaign.

=== Subsequent career ===
Collier served as captain of Cyane from September 1810 until May 1812. In early 1812, a seaman named Oakey struck Collier, was charged, found guilty and sentenced to death. His plea for a stay of execution was denied, and every ship in port sent a boat of seamen to witness the hanging. Oakey came on deck with his arms tied behind him, attended by the Chaplain, and the sentence of the Court Martial was read. Then Captain Hall produced a letter from the Prince Regent that, at Collier's request, commuted Oakey's sentence to transportation. The reprieve surprised Oakey, who fell on his knees and wept.

=== Post-war ===
At the end of the war in 1815 Collier was made a Companion of the Order of the Bath for his services, mainly in the West Indies.

In 1818, Collier took command of the fourth rate Liverpool and joined the squadron on the East Indies Station. The following year he was given command of a joint Navy and East India Company squadron including the 20-gun post-ship Eden, the 18-gun brig-sloop Curlew, several East India Company cruisers, and a number of gun and mortar boats. Several vessels belonging to the Sultan of Muscat joined them, while Major General Sir William Keir commanded 3,000 troops in transports.

The squadron's task was to destroy the pirate bases in the Persian Gulf and simultaneously eliminate the company's competition in the region. The operation lasted from 4 to 8 December and was a resounding success for the Royal Navy. The capture and destruction of the fortifications and ships in the pirate capital of Ras al-Khaimah was a massive blow to the local pirates. The Royal Navy suffered no casualties during the action.

In 1820 the pirate states signed a treaty that effectively eliminated them as a threat to British shipping. In 1822 Collier returned to Britain, and between 1826 and 1830 he was the commodore in command of the West African Station. He raised his pennant in Sybille; during the time she was engaged in anti-slavery duties off West Africa, Sybille captured numerous slavers and freed some 3,500 slaves.

== Late career and honours ==
For his varied service he was knighted on 28 July 1830 and then admitted to the Persian Order of the Lion and the Sun for his service in the Persian Gulf. In 1833 he was made a Knight Commander of the Royal Guelphic Order and in 1841 became the commandant of Woolwich Dockyard, moving in 1846 to command a squadron in the Channel Fleet as a rear-admiral. In April 1848 he was made commander on the East Indies and China Station and took up his position at Hong Kong later in the year.

== Death ==
He died in October 1849 at Hong Kong, and is buried at Hong Kong Cemetery. He was survived by his second wife, Catherine Thistlethwaite, whom he had married in 1831, and their child, Selina Catherine Collier, although few details are known of his family life. He was, however, a well-known figure on the racecourse in the 1830s and early 1840s and won the 1836 Ascot Derby (now known as The King Edward VII Stakes) with Lieutenant.

== See also ==
- O'Byrne, William Richard (1849). A Naval Biographical Dictionary . John Murray – via Wikisource.

Military offices
Preceded by Samuel Inglefield	Commander-in-Chief, East Indies and China Station; 1848–1849	Succeeded by Sir Charles Austen
