= HMS Liverpool (1814) =

Frigate of the Royal Navy

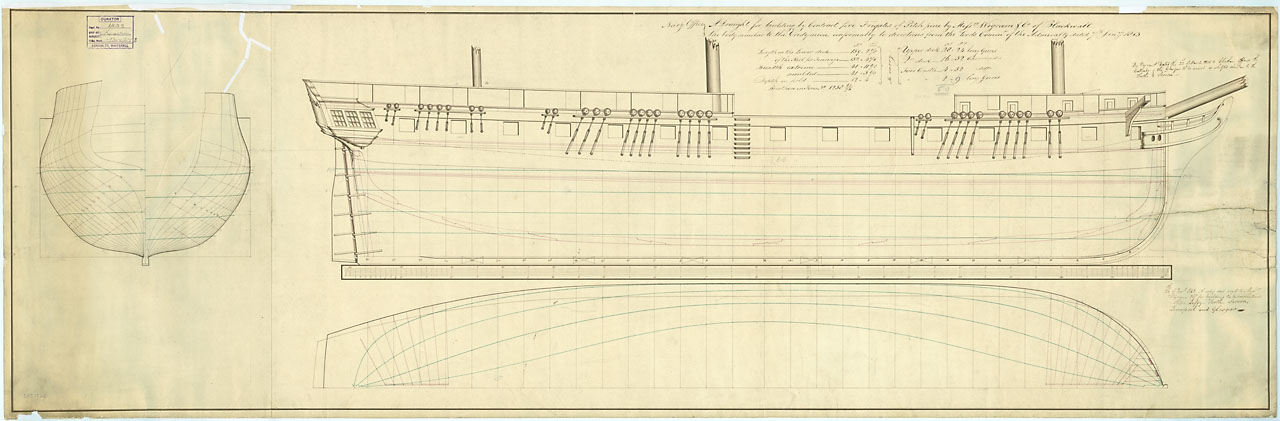
- Ship's plan for Liverpool

History

United Kingdom
- Name: HMS Liverpool
- Builder: Wigram, Wells & Green, Blackwall Yard, London
- Laid down: May 1813
- Launched: 21 February 1814
- Commissioned: May 1814
- Decommissioned: 3 April 1816
- Recommissioned: 1818
- Decommissioned: January 1822
- Fate: Sold, 1822

General characteristics
- Class & type: Endymion-class frigate, reclassified as a fourth rate
- Tons burthen: 124686/94 bm
- Length: 159 ft (48.5 m) (overall)
- Beam: 41 ft (12.5 m)
- Draught: 12 ft 4 in (3.8 m)
- Sail plan: Full-rigged ship
- Speed: 14 knots (16 mph; 26 km/h)
- Complement: 300
- Armament: Upper deck: 28 × 24-pounder guns; QD: 16 × 32-pounder carronades; Fc: 2 × 9-pounder guns + 4 × 32-pounder carronades

HMS Liverpool was a Royal Navy Endymion-class frigate, reclassified as a fourth rate. She was built by Wigram, Wells and Green and launched at Woolwich on 21 February 1814. She was built of pitch-pine, which made for speedy construction at the expense of durability.

Her major service was on the East Indies Station from where in 1819 she led the successful punitive campaign against the Al Qasimi, a belligerent naval power based in Ras Al Khaimah which the British considered to be piratical. She was sold in 1822 but continued to operate in the Persian Gulf for an indefinite period thereafter.

== Service ==
Liverpool was commissioned under Captain Arthur Farquhar in May 1814. Her first commission was very brief, though. She escorted convoys to Newfoundland, Nova Scotia and Quebec. She then served at the Cape Station before returning to Deptford to be paid off on 3 April 1816. First, though, she captured the French schooner Circonstance on 21 October 1815. Circonstance was carrying 67 slaves. (Note: The first-class share of the bounty money for the release of the slaves was worth £111 0s 3d; a sixth-class share, that of an ordinary seaman, was worth 16s 5½d.)

On 5 Match 1816, Liverpool was driven ashore and severely damaged at Dover, Kent, England. She was later refloated and taken in to The Downs. In 1817 she was laid up at Deptford.

In 1818, Liverpool was re-commissioned under Captain Francis Augustus Collier. He sailed her to join the East Indies Station, sailing via Mauritius and Trincomalee. While at Port Louis she captured four slave vessels. In the middle of 1819 she captured Deux Amis (29 July), Constance (17 August) and Jenny (24 August). Bounty money was paid for the freed slaves. (Note: The first-class share was worth £214 10s 7½d; a sixth-class share was worth £1 17s 10¼d.)

== Persian Gulf campaign of 1819 ==
Rear Admiral King appointed Captain Collier of Liverpool to command the naval portion of a joint navy-army punitive expedition against the Al Qasimi at Ras Al Khaimah in the Persian Gulf. The naval force consisted of Liverpool, Eden, Curlew, and a number of gun and mortar boats. The Bombay Marine of the East India Company contributed six armed vessels: the 16-gun Teignmouth under the command of Captain Hall, the senior captain, the 16-gun Benares, the 14-gun Aurora, the 14-gun Nautilus, the 12-gun Ariel, and the 12-gun Vestal. Later two frigates and 600 men belonging to the Sultan of Muscat joined the expedition. On the army side, Major General Sir William Keir commanded some 3,000 troops in transports, including the 47th and 65th Regiments of Foot, the 1st Battalion of the 2nd Regiment of Native Infantry, the flank companies of the 1st Battalion of the 3rd Regiment of Native Infantry and of the Marine Battalion, and half a company of Pioneers. In all, 1,645 European and 1,424 Indian soldiers ('sepoys') and marines took part in the expedition.

The fleet anchored off Ras Al Khaimah on 2 December, landing troops two miles south of the town on 3 December. Collier placed Captain Walpole of Curlew in charge of the gun boats and an armed pinnace to protect the landing, which was, however, unopposed. The bombardment of the town commenced on 6 December, from landed batteries of 12 pound guns and mortars as well as from sea. On 7 December, two 24-pound cannon from Liverpool were added to the land batteries. When the troops stormed the town on 9 December they found that the inhabitants had all fled. The siege cost the British five dead and 52 men wounded. The Al Qasimi reportedly had lost a thousand dead.

On the fall of Ras Al Khaimah, three ships were sent to blockade the nearby harbour at Rams, to the North. They landed a force on 18 December, which fought its way inland through date plantations to the hilltop fort of Dhayah on the 19th. There, 398 men and another 400 women and children held out, without water or effective cover from the sun, for three days under heavy fire until the two 24-pound cannon from Liverpool were once again pressed into use. After enduring two hours of fire from the big guns, which breached the fort's walls, the last of the Al Qasimi surrendered at 10.30 on the morning of the 22nd.

The expeditionary force then blew up the town of Ras Al Khaimah and established a garrison there of 800 sepoys and artillery, before visiting Jazirat Al Hamra, which was found to be deserted. They went on to destroy the fortifications and larger vessels of Umm Al Qawain, Ajman, Fasht, Sharjah, Abu Hail, and Dubai. Ten vessels that had taken shelter in Bahrain were also destroyed. The Royal Navy suffered no casualties during the action.

The action was to result in the signing of the General Maritime Treaty of 1820, the first treaty between the British and the Sheikhs of what was formerly known as the Pirate Coast and what would become known as the Trucial Coast. The area is known today as the United Arab Emirates (UAE).

== Fate ==
Liverpool carried on serving in the East Indies Station and made a trip to China under Collier. Liverpool returned to the Persian Gulf in August 1821, where she lost a number of her crew to the heat. She was paid off at Bombay in January 1822. Liverpool's captain, officers and crew then transferred to the newly built Ganges and sailed her back to Spithead, arriving on 6 October 1822.

Liverpool was sold at Bombay on 16 April 1822 for £3,780. The buyer apparently was a Persian prince who wanted to use her to suppress piracy in the Persian Gulf.
