= HMS Curlew (1812) =

Brig-sloop of the Royal Navy

History

United Kingdom
- Name: HMS Curlew
- Namesake: Curlew
- Ordered: 30 August 1811
- Builder: William Good & Co., Bridport
- Laid down: October 1811
- Launched: 27 May 1812
- Commissioned: July 1812
- Decommissioned: 1822
- Fate: Sold, December 1822

United Kingdom
- Name: Jamesina
- Owner: James Matheson
- Route: India–China
- Acquired: 1822
- Fate: Unknown

General characteristics
- Class & type: Cruizer-class brig-sloop
- Tons burthen: 38551/94, or 494 (bm)
- Length: 100 ft 1 in (30.5 m) o/a; 77 ft 3 1/2 in (23.6 m) (keel)
- Beam: 30 ft 7 1/2 in (9.3 m)
- Draught: 6 ft 6 in (2.0 m) (unladen); 11 ft 6 in (3.5 m) (laden)
- Depth of hold: 12 ft 10 in (3.9 m)
- Sail plan: Brig
- Complement: 121
- Armament: 16 × 32-pounder carronades; 2 × 6-pounder bow guns

HMS Curlew (1812) was a Cruizer class brig-sloop built by (William) Good & Co., at Bridport for the Royal Navy and launched in 1812. She served with the Navy for only 10 years. During the War of 1812 she sailed from Halifax and captured several American privateers. Her greatest moment was her role in the 1819 British occupation of Ras Al Khaimah, leading to the signature of the General Maritime Treaty of 1820, which established the Trucial States, today the United Arab Emirates. Curlew was sold in 1822 in Bombay. She then had a 13 or so year career as an opium runner for James Matheson, one of the founders of the firm Jardine Matheson.

== War of 1812 ==
Commander Michael Head was appointed to Curlew on 27 June 1812 and commissioned her in July. She was still at Portsmouth on 31 July when the British authorities seized the American ships there and at Spithead on the outbreak of the War of 1812. She therefore shared, with numerous other vessels, in the subsequent prize money for these vessels: Belleville, Aeos, Janus, Ganges, and Leonidas. (Note: A first-class share of the prize money was worth £20 19s 0d; a sixth-class share, that of an ordinary seaman, was worth 4s 1d.)

Head sailed Curlew for North America on 28 August. (Note: Head was a native of Nova Scotia having been born to physician in Halifax, Nova Scotia.) On 31 October, Curlew was in company with Shannon, Nymphe and Tenedos when Shannon captured the privateer brig Thorn. Thorn was armed with eighteen long 9-pounders and had a crew of 140 men. Thorn, of Salem, was under the command of Captain T. Harper and was three weeks into her first cruise. Prior to being herself captured, Thorn had captured a brig carrying salt. (Note: A first-class share for Thorn was worth £32 9s 8d; a sixth-class share was worth 4s 7d.)

Next month, on 6 November, Curlew and the same squadron recaptured the brig Friendship. A privateer had captured her while she was sailing from Quebec to Tenerife.

Curlew was among the vessels that shared in the capture on 1 February 1813 of the ship Hebe. Hebe had been sailing from Smyrna to London.

In March 1813, Nymphe, Hogue and Curlew sent in to Halifax a ship from Wiscasset, that had been bound for Saint Barts. On 2 April, Curlew brought into Halifax the American letter of marquee Volante of 22 guns, or 14 guns, and 90 men. Actually, Volante was pierced for 22 guns but carried only ten 24-pounder carronades and four long 9-pounders, giving her a broadside roughly half that of Curlew's. Taking Volante involved an exchange of shots but no casualties were reported. Lloyd's List describes Volant, of Boston, as being of 550 tons bm, armed with twenty 24-pounders, and having a crew of 90 men. She had been sailing from Bayonne with a cargo of wine, silks, brandy, and the like.

Curlew captured the Sally on 24 April. She was of 143 tons burthen, out of Salem, and sailing to St Margaret's.

On 2 May the American frigates President and Congress fell in with Curlew. Fortunately for Curlew, Head was able to out-sail them and escape. Nineteen days later, Curlew and the frigate Tenedos captured the American privateer schooner Enterprise, of four guns and 91 men, out of Salem. Enterprise had been on a four-month-long cruise off Brazil but had not taken any prizes.

On 26 May, Curlew and Martin recaptured the brig Thomas and Sally, R.Stocks, master.

In July, Curlew captured three small schooners. She captured two on 7 July, Swift, of 63 tons (bm), from Cape cod to Ipswich, and Two Brothers, 53 tons (bm), from Kennebeck, and also sailing to Ipswich. Two days later Curlew captured the schooner Precilla, of 61 tons (bm), sailing to Boston. Then almost a month later, on 7 August, Curlew captured the sloop Eunice. In between, on 8 July, Curlew was in sight when Hogue captured Fanny. (Note: A first-class share was worth £86 0s 11d; a sixth-class share was worth 14s 9d.)

In August 1813, Curlew and Nymphe captured three small prizes. On 12 August they took the fishing vessel Gennet. Then five days later they captured the sloop Endeavor, sailing from Castine to Boston. In between, on 14 August, Nymphe's yawl (armed with a carronade), and supported by Curlew's boats, chased a schooner for eight hours off Cape Cod, in little wind, before they captured her. The schooner was the letter of marque Paragon, of 157 tons burthen, 20 men, and pierced for 16 guns but carrying four, two 12-pounders and two 9-pounders.

In March 1814 the American privateer Rambler captured Union, Rennie, master, sailing from Jamaica to Glasgow. Curlew recaptured Union off Cape Sable. Unfortunately, Union was lost off Sambro Light during the night of 31 March. Only a few bags of cotton and some rigging were saved.

On 9 April 1814 Curlew captured the brig Plutus. Then on 4 May she captured the Spanish brig Maria Francisca, which Victorious had earlier captured, as had Diomede. On 25 May Curlew recaptured Ontario. That same day, together with Martin, she recaptured the brig Two Brothers. The next day, Curlew and Martin recaptured the brig Thomas and Sally.

On 25 May Curlew and Martin recaptured the bark Two Brothers, J. Tucker, master. Two Brothers had been sailing from Liverpool to the Balti with a cargo of salt, crates of ware, rum, and coffee when she had been captured.

On 28 May 1814 Curlew was in Halifax, having retaken and sent in Ontario and other vessels. Commander Hugh Pearson assumed command in June after Head was promoted to post-captain on 7 June.

Curlew, Maidstone, Arab, and Junon shared in the detention, on 23 November 1814 of Firmina, of 260 tons (bm), Antonio Jose Fereira, master. She had been sailing from Boston to Amelia Island in ballast. The Vice admiralty court in Halifax restored her to her owners.

She returned from Bermuda with the warship Bacchante, accompanied by the troopships HMS Melpomene and HMS Ceylon, arriving at Portsmouth on 22 June 1815.

== Persian Gulf campaign ==
From November to January 1817 she was Chatham undergoing repairs. Between February and April 1818 she was fitted for sea. Commander William Walpole commissioned her for the East Indies.

On 8 May Curlew was at Mauritius. On 18 August 1819 she was reported to be cruising in the Persian Gulf. By September she was in Bombay. On the way 15 large Joasmi (Al Qasimi) Arab boats attacked her. After five hours of fighting she had sunk three and captured seven.

Rear Admiral King appointed Captain Collier of HMS Liverpool to command the naval portion of the 1819 joint navy-army punitive expedition against the Al Qasimi at Ras Al Khaimah in the Persian Gulf. The naval force consisted of Liverpool, Eden, Curlew, and a number of gun and mortar boats. The Bombay Marine of the East India Company contributed six armed vessels: the 16-gun Teignmouth under the command of Captain Hall, the senior captain, the 16-gun Benares, the 14-gun Aurora, the 14-gun Nautilus, the 12-gun Ariel, and the 12-gun Vestal. Later two frigates and 600 men belonging to the Sultan of Muscat joined the expedition. On the army side, Major General Sir William Keir commanded some 3,000 troops in transports, including the 47th and 65th Regiments, the 1st Battalion of the 2nd Regiment of Native Infantry, the flank companies of the 1st Battalion of the 3rd Regiment of Native Infantry and of the Marine Battalion and half a company of Pioneers. In all, 1,645 European and 1,424 Indian soldiers ('sepoys') and marines took part in the expedition.

The fleet anchored off Ras Al Khaimah on 2 December, landing troops two miles south of the town on 3 December. Collier placed Captain Walpole of Curlew in charge of the gun boats and an armed pinnace to protect the landing, which was, however, unopposed. The bombardment of the town commenced on 6 December, from landed batteries of 12 pound guns and mortars as well as from sea. On 7 December, two 24-pound cannon from Liverpool were added to the land batteries. When the troops stormed the town on 9 December they found that the inhabitants had all fled. The siege cost the British five dead and 52 men wounded. The Arabs reportedly had lost a thousand dead.

On the fall of Ras Al Khaimah, three ships - including Curlew - were sent to blockade nearby Rams, landing a force on 18 December which fought its way inland through date plantations to the hilltop fort of Dhayah on the 19th, where almost 400 men and another 400 women and children held out for three days under heavy fire until the two 24-pound cannon from Liverpool were once again pressed into use and, following two hours of fire, the last of the Al Qasimi surrendered on the morning of the 22nd.

The town of Ras Al Khaimah was razed and a garrison was established there, consisting of 800 sepoys and artillery. The expedition then visited Jazirat Al Hamra, which was deserted, but then went on to bombard and destroy the fortifications and larger vessels of Umm Al Quwain, Ajman, Fasht, Sharjah, Abu Hail and Dubai. Ten vessels which had taken shelter in Bahrain were also destroyed. The Royal Navy suffered no casualties during the action.

In December Commander George Gambier replaced Walpole who had received a promotion to Post-captain for his role in the attack on the pirates. Walpole returned to Britain as captain of HMS Seringpatam. In April 1820 Lieutenant The Right Honourable Price Blackwood replaced Gambier. (Note: Blackwood was later the fourth Baron Dufferin and Claneboye, of Ballyleidy and Killyleeagh, county Down (1800), and the fifth Baronet (1763).) (Blackwood was promoted to Commander on 4 June 1821.) In November 1820 Curlew participated in another punitive expedition, but due to disagreement between Blackwood and Captain Thompson of the Army, a naval force did not accompany the army inland and so missed the debacle that followed. Later, Blackwood sailed Curlew to the China seas.

== Mercantile service: opium running ==
On 28 December 1822, the Admiralty sold Curlew to James Matheson at Bombay for 15,100 rupees. He renamed her Jamesina.

Jamesina proceeded to run opium for more than a decade thereafter. The reason Matheson bought a naval vessel was that the opium merchants had found that their firepower was an effective deterrent to Chinese pirates and customs officials. Although the naval vessels were not designed to carry cargo, opium was compact. Crews were mixed. One report gives the Jamesina's crew in 1832 as consisting of 10 Europeans, 54 Indian lascars, and four Chinese staff.

By the 1830s opium was the single most valuable commodity traded in the world. Though the trade was illegal, there was no shortage of suppliers. In 1830, James Matheson chartered the new steam tug Forbes, and bet $1000 that she could reach Lintin from Sandheads in a month. Forbes towed Jamesina, carrying 840 chests of Bengal opium, from Calcutta to Singapore, from where Jamesina and Forbes both proceeded under sail. Forbes could only carry 130 tons of coal; Jamesina carried another 52 tons, in addition to her opium. On 12 April, with only four days of coal left, the two parted. Forbes arrived at Hong Kong two days before Jamesina. Matheson lost his bet, but Jamesina was still the first opium vessel to arrive that season.

William Jardine and James Matheson chartered four vessels to sail north to explore the possibility of new markets for opium. Sylph, Wallace, master, left Lintin on 20 October 1832 and returned on 29 April 1833. Jamesina, James Innes, master, left Lintin on 8 November and returned in early spring 1833. The next two vessels were John Biggar, William Makay, master, and Colonel Young, John Rees, master.

In 1833 Jamesina sold £330,000 worth of opium at Fuzhou (Foochow), Amoy, Ningbo (Ningpo) and other Chinese ports. This may have occurred during her voyage north.

In the mid-1930s, Magniac & Co. used Jamesina, in Hong Kong, as a floating warehouse for opium. (Note: Magniac & Co. was renamed Jardine Matheson & Co. on 1 July 1832. Jardine and Matheson had delayed the name change to assist Magniac, their former partner.) It is not clear when and what her final disposition was.
