= John Toup Nicolas =

British Royal Navy officer (1788–1851)

Rear-Admiral John Toup Nicolas CB KH (1788–1851) was a Royal Navy officer.

Nicolas was born in East Looe, Cornwall. He entered the Royal Navy in 1797 and later served on various ships, including HMS Edgar, HMS Malta, and HMS Queen. As a lieutenant, he participated in the 3rd Battle of Cape Finisterre in 1805. Nicolas commanded several successful attacks while in charge of HMS Pilot, earning praise from the British press. He was promoted to Captain in 1815 and later commanded HMS Egeria, HMS Hercules, HMS Belleisle, and HMS Vindictive. Nicolas was appointed Superintendent of the Victualling Yard at Plymouth in 1847 and retired as Rear Admiral in 1850. He died in Plymouth and is buried in St Martin's Church there.

== Life ==
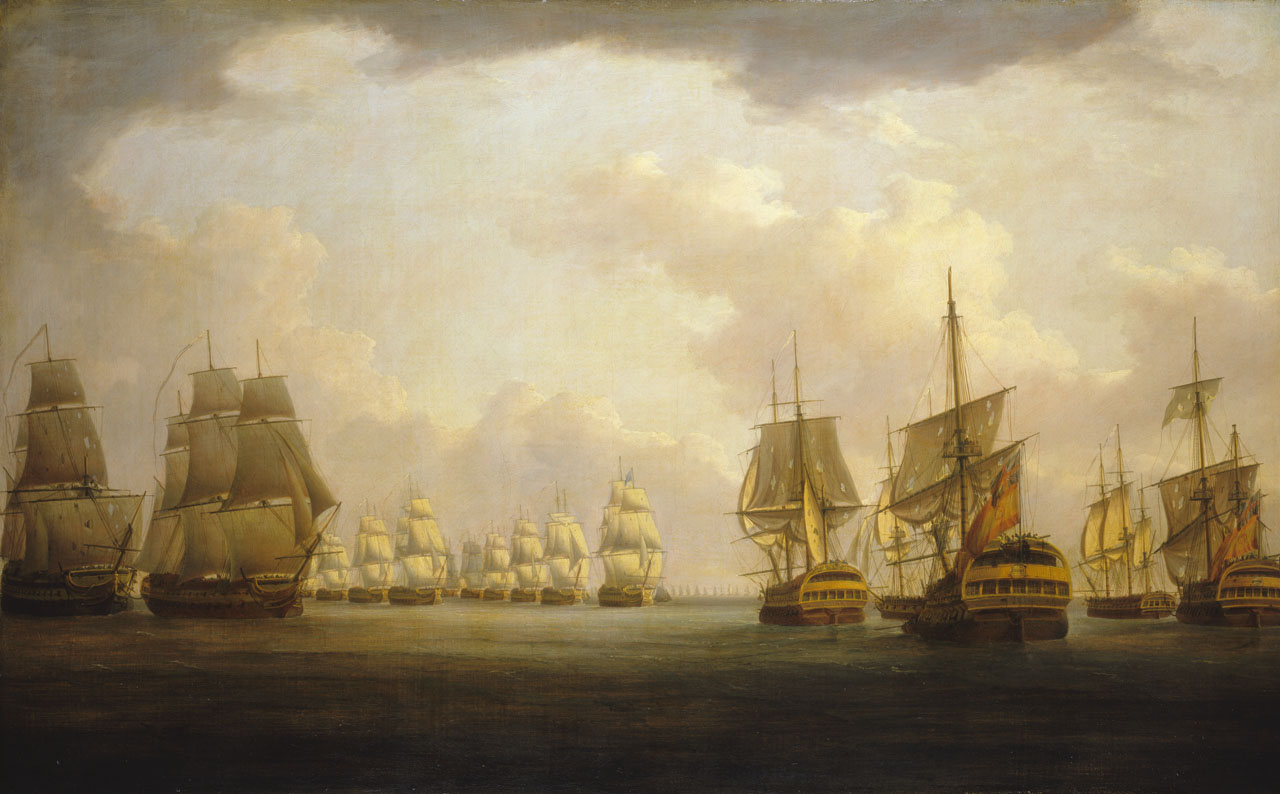
Battle of Cape Finisterre

He was the eldest son of Lieutenant (Commander) John Harris Nicolas R.N. (1758–1844) and his wife, Margaret Blake. He was born on 22 February 1788 at East Looe in Cornwall. He was the brother of antiquarian Nicholas Harris Nicolas; 1st Lt Paul Harris Nicolas RM; and Lt Keigwin Nicolas RN (died 17 June 1815). His wider family nearly all had military or naval connections.

He entered the Royal Navy in 1797 as a boy (first class volunteer) but was not allowed at sea until he was older (11 in February 1799) then serving as on a gunboat HMS Attack serving at the Dartmouth station. In September 1799 he was promoted to midshipman and transferred to the 74-gun HMS Edgar under Captain Edward Butler serving in the English Channel. He and Captain Butler left the ship together (indicating that Nicolas was perhaps his valet) and together moved to HMS Achille. After a brief spell apart on HMS Naiad he rejoined Captain Butler on the 80-gun HMS Malta in March 1803.

He was created Lieutenant on HMS Malta on 1 May 1805. Soon after, on 22 July 1805, he took part in his first major sea-battle: the 3rd Battle of Cape Finisterre off the north-west coast of Iberia. They then sailed to the Mediterranean and spent two years patrolling. In February 1807, the ship took place in the blockade of Cádiz.

In June 1807 he was created flag-lieutenant on the 98-gun HMS Queen and in October 1807 was created flag-lieutenant on the 80-gun HMS Canopus under Rear Admiral George Martin.

== Commander ==
On 12 October 1809 he was given command of HMS Lapwing, his first command, and in April 1810 moved to command the 18 gun brig, HMS Pilot. Although relatively small, the Pilot was well-armed for her size, and very manoeuvrable. Consequently, Lt Nicolas used Pilot in several successful attacks:

- 24 June 1810 - With the schooner Ortenzia near San Lucido on the Calabrian coast attacked a convoy of 51 vessels including 16 armed vessels at the loss of only 3 British killed.
- 25 July 1810 - With HMS Thames under Granville George Waldegrave and HMS Weazle attacked an enemy Neapolitan convoy off Calabria consisting of 32 transport ships and 7 gunboats and four other armed vessels, all under command of Giovanni Caracciolo. This successful attack was at the British loss of only one killed and six wounded.
- 26 May 1811 - HMS Pilot in a solo attacked vessels on a beach between Neto and Lipuda on the Calabrian coast, capturing three vessels at the loss of only one British wounded.
- 6 September 1811 - As a solo action Pilot burnt a ketch under the walls of Castella
- 16 April 1812 - Pilot in a solo action captured nine vessels on a beach near Policastro Bussentino in Campania
- 14 May 1812 - With HMS Thames under Captain Charles Napier attacked a battery at Sapri with a group of marines led by Rofer Langlands caused the battery to surrender and captured 28 barges containing oil.
- June 1812 - With HMS Cephalus and HMS Euryalus attacked a large convoy being protected by three batteries off Dino. An unsuccessful attack with heavy damage to the Pilot
- 17 June 1815 - In a solo attack against the French ship La Legere under Nicolas Tuffet off Cape Corso. This action was inclusive, in that despite causing much loss of life on the French ship, the Pilot was so damaged that it could not pursue. The Pilot lost only one: Nicolas's own brother, Lt William Keigwin Nicolas, who was buried at sea.

== Promotion ==
On 4 June 1815 he was awarded a Commander of the Order of the Bath by the Prince Regent.

As a result of the previous years' success, which received much praise in the British press, Nicolas was promoted to Captain on 26 August 1815, but retained notional charge of HMS Pilot, which had been returned to Plymouth Dockyard for major repairs in July 1815.

He was given a period of extended shore leave before being given command of 20-gun HMS Egeria and her crew of 121 men on 5 January 1820 in place of Captain Henry Shiffner.

In 1834 he was awarded a Knight of the Royal Guelphic Order by King William IV.

In August 1837 he was made Captain and Commander of the 74-gun HMS Hercules, one of the many huge ships commissioned during the Napoleonic Wars and ending as largely redundant when a prolonged peace was achieved. (see Pax Britannica).

In April 1839 he took over the 74-gun HMS Belleisle and in September 1841 moved to HMS Vindictive which had had its armament reduced from 74 to 50 guns. On the latter he served in the East Indies.

On 1 September 1847 he was appointed Superintendent of the Victualling Yard at Plymouth: a desk job. He never returned to sea. He was retired at the rank of Rear Admiral on New Year's Eve 1850. He died in Plymouth on 1 April 1851. He is buried in St Martin's Church in Plymouth.

== Family ==
On 1 August 1818 he married Frances Anna Were (1799 - c. 1877), daughter of Nicholas Were of Landcox near Wellington, Somerset.

They had a son: Granville Toup Nicolas. He also joined the Royal Navy, reaching the rank of Captain and died in Edinburgh in 1894. Their daughter, Frances Anna Nicolas (1827-1838), did not survive to adulthood.
