= HMS Tigris (1813) =

Royal Navy fifth-rate frigate

- Plan of the Scamander-class frigates

History

United Kingdom
- Name: Tigris
- Namesake: Tigris River
- Ordered: 4 May 1812
- Builder: John Pelham, Frindsbury
- Laid down: September 1812
- Launched: 26 June 1813
- Completed: 24 December 1813
- Commissioned: October 1813
- Out of service: 13 January 1818
- Fate: Sold 11 June 1818

General characteristics
- Class & type: Fifth-rate Scamander-class frigate
- Tons burthen: 934 (bm)
- Length: 143 ft (43.6 m) (upper deck); 119 ft 11 7/8 in (36.6 m) (keel)
- Beam: 38 ft 3 in (11.7 m)
- Draught: 8 ft 7 in (2.6 m) (forward); 12 ft 9 in (3.9 m) (aft)
- Depth of hold: 12 ft 4 in (3.8 m)
- Propulsion: Sails
- Complement: 284
- Armament: UD: 26 × 18-pounder guns; QD: 12 × 32-pounder carronades; Fc: 2 × 9-pounder guns + 2 × 32-pounder carronades

HMS Tigris was a 36-gun Scamander-class frigate of the Royal Navy. Tigris was commissioned in October 1813 under the command of Captain Robert Henderson. Serving on the Irish Station, between 19 and 20 July 1814 she chased USS Adams, failing to catch the American frigate after the wind damaged her rigging. After the end of the Napoleonic Wars, Tigris served on the Leeward Islands Station and then in 1817 operated in the English Channel as escort to Prince William Frederick, Duke of Gloucester and Edinburgh. In poor condition, the ship was sold the following year.

== Design ==
Tigris was a 36-gun fifth-rate frigate of the Scamander class. The class was constructed as part of the reaction of the Admiralty, headed by Lord Melville, to the beginning of the War of 1812. This new theatre of operations, with the Napoleonic Wars ongoing, was expected to put a strain on the existing fleet of Royal Navy frigates. Designed by the Surveyor of the Navy, Sir William Rule, the Scamander class was put into construction to fill this need. The class was a variant of the existing Apollo-class frigate, which had been the standard design for 36-gun frigates in the Royal Navy for over a decade. The class was particularly copied from the lines of the 36-gun frigate HMS Euryalus.

The war was expected to only be a short affair, and so ships built specifically for it were not designed for long service lives. As such Tigris's class was ordered to be constructed out of the soft but easily available red and yellow pine. Using pine for construction meant that the usually long period of time between keel laying and launching could be dramatically decreased to as little as three months. Pine-built ships could usually be differentiated from those of oak by their flat "square tuck" stern, but as copies of oak-built ships the Scamander class did not have this feature. The naval historian Robert Gardiner describes the class as an austerity version of the Apollos.

Pine was a lighter material than oak which allowed the ships to often sail faster than those built of the heavier wood, but at the expense of requiring more ballast to ensure that they sat at their designated waterline. As such, Tigris and her class were designed with a distinctly shallower depth in the hold. This ensured that the frigates were not adversely affected by the excess ballast, which could cause them to sail overly rigidly and without much give.

== Construction ==
The first seven ships of the Scamander class, six of which were ordered in May before the war had begun, were built with red pine. Tigris was one of these. The final three received yellow pine. All ships of the class were ordered to commercial shipyards rather than Royal Navy Dockyards, with the navy providing the pine for their construction from its own stocks. Tigris was ordered on 4 May 1812, to be built by the shipwright John Pelham at Frindsbury. She was initially ordered under the name Forth, but this was changed on 11 December for her namesake the Tigris River. She was the first Royal Navy vessel to bear the name. The frigate was laid down in September, and launched on 26 June 1813 with the following dimensions: 143 feet (43.6 m) along the upper deck, 119 feet 11 7/8 inches (36.6 m) at the keel, with a beam of 38 feet 3 inches (11.7 m) and a depth of hold of 12 feet 4 inches (3.8 m). The ship had a draught of 8 feet 7 inches (2.6 m) forward and 12 feet 9 inches (3.9 m) aft, and measured 934 tons burthen.

The fitting out process for Tigris was completed at Chatham Dockyard on 24 December 1813. The frigate originally had a complement of 274, but this was increased to 284 for her class on 26 January 1813, while she was under construction. Tigris held twenty-six 18-pounder long guns on her upper deck. Complementing this armament were twelve 32-pounder carronades on the quarterdeck, with two 9-pounder long guns and two additional 32-pounder carronades on the forecastle.

=== Characteristics ===
Frigates of the Scamander class were reported by crews to handle well, being manoeuvrable and fast especially when off the wind. The decreased depth of the hold, which promoted these characteristics, also meant that the frigates were unable to carry more than three months of provisions in the assigned space. If the ships needed to be at sea for as much as six months then water supplies had to be sacrificed to provide space for the food. Tigris was one of the fastest ships in her class, being recorded at as much as 13 knots (24.1 km/h).

== Service ==
=== Irish Station ===
Tigris was commissioned in October 1813 under the command of Captain Robert Henderson. Intended for service on the Irish Station, the ship was delayed in this by difficulties in recruiting enough seamen. Tigris eventually joined the station in February 1814. Her service on the station was predominantly mundane; on one occasion a fever spread onboard, killing some of the crew, forcing Tigris to return to port.

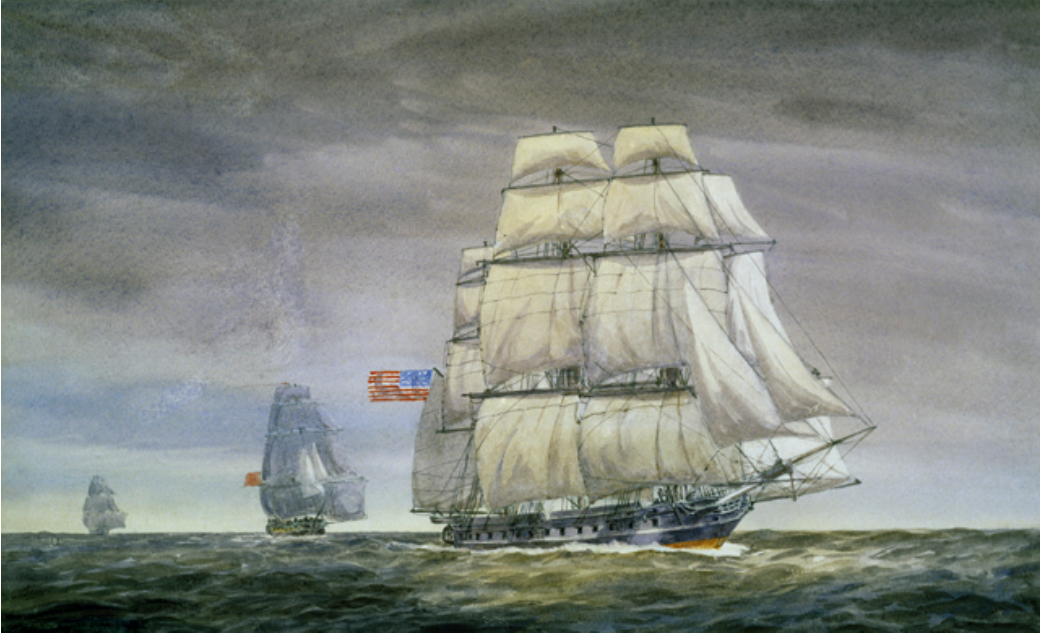
USS Adams was chased by Tigris in July 1814

The ship was paid off at the end of the War of the Sixth Coalition in May. Tigris was then recommissioned, still under Henderson, and returned to service after another delay to recruit a new crew. On 13 July Tigris was sailing south of Ireland in sight of her sister ship HMS Eridanus, when the latter chased the American 28-gun frigate USS Adams. Sea conditions were poor and Eridanus did not identify Adams to Tigris, leaving only the former to chase the American, which escaped on 15 July.

Tigris then encountered Adams in the Irish Sea early on 19 July, beginning a new chase. By midday fog had rolled in, with Tigris about 4 miles (6.4 km) behind Adams. Soon afterwards the wind blew away Tigris's foretopgallant mast. Repairs took the crew an hour and a half before they could continue the chase. The wind continued to damage the ship's rigging, slowing her so that at 9:40 p.m. Tigris lost sight of Adams. Henderson stayed in the area to search for the American, and at about 2:40 a.m. re-located Adams. Still behind in the chase, Tigris attempted to set more sail to increase speed but the wind only caused further damage to the ship. Adams, which had increased her own speed by throwing some guns and stores overboard, escaped Tigris for a final time at 9:45 p.m. on 20 July. The chase had spanned 400 miles (640 km) and taken Tigris far into the Atlantic Ocean.

=== Leeward Islands ===
The ship sailed to the Leeward Islands in the West Indies as escort to a convoy in October. Tigris returned to Britain in May 1815; by 15 September she was at Plymouth Dockyard. With the Napoleonic Wars over, the ship was to be refitted for service on the peace establishment of the Royal Navy. This had been completed by March 1816, and Tigris subsequently joined the Leeward Islands Station. On 24 May 1817 she returned to Britain carrying dispatches from Rear-Admiral John Harvey, which included the first news of the Pernambucan revolution in Brazil.

=== Royal services ===
Tigris was subsequently sent to serve in the English Channel. On 18 September Tigris conveyed Prince William Frederick, Duke of Gloucester and Edinburgh, to Guernsey, and then on the following day took him on to Jersey. The ship subsequently continued in royal service, taking Gloucester from Weymouth to Plymouth on 7 October for a visit to Richard Edgcumbe, 2nd Earl of Mount Edgcumbe. Gloucester then used Tigris's barge on the following day to make a royal visit to the flagship at Plymouth, the 98-gun ship of the line HMS Impregnable. Tigris arrived at Portsmouth Dockyard from a cruise in early December. Found to be in poor condition, she was paid off on 13 January 1818. The ship was sold on 11 June to Joshua Crystall for £3,020 (equivalent to £223,682 in 2025).
