= Indian (1815 ship) =

History

United States
- Builder: New York
- Launched: 1813
- Captured: c.1814

United Kingdom
- Name: Indian
- Acquired: c.1815 by purchase of a prize
- Fate: Condemned March 1821

General characteristics
- Tons burthen: 197, or 210 (bm)

Indian was launched in 1813 in New York, possibly under another name. She entered British records in 1815, probably as a prize. In 1820 she sailed to Valparaiso. While in the Pacific, she rescued three survivors from the whaler Essex. At Chile, she got caught up in the conflict between Spain and the independence movement in Peru and Chile. She was condemned at Valparaiso in March 1821.

== Career ==
Indian first appeared in Lloyd's Register (LR) in 1815.

Year	Master	Owner	Trade	Source
1815	Elder	Sarjeant & Co.	London–St Thomas	LR
1819	Elder; Crozier	Sarjeant; Briant	Liverpool–Charleston	LR
1821	Crozer	Crozer	London–Valparaiso	Register of Shipping; repairs 1819

== The Essex ==
Indian was caught up in the conflict between Spain and the local independence movement in South America. The Chilean squadron had detained Edward Ellice and Lord Suffield at Callao in December 1820; the Spanish authorities had seized Grant. The report listed a number of other vessels, British and American, such as Indian, that had also been detained by one side or the other.

On 18 February 1821, 89 days after a whale sank Essex, Indian, Crozier, master, spotted and rescued three survivors. (Note: The crew of Essex had taken to three whaleboats. The boatsteerer Thomas Nickerson (1805-1883), and two other men were in the boat Indian encountered. Thomas Nickerson next served as a boatsteerer on Two Brothers. He wrote about the wreck of Two Brothers. Nickerson's account is preserved in a manuscript titled "Loss of the Ship Two Brothers of Nantucket" (MS 106 F3.5) in the collections of the Nantucket Historical Association.) Indian had encountered the three men in their modified whaleboat at 33°45′S 81°3′W. She arrived at Valparaiso on 25 February.

Edward Ellice, Lord Suffield, and Indian, which Lord Cochrane's squadron had detained, arrived at Valparaiso on 1 March 1821 for adjudication. A later report was that the Prize Court at Valparaiso had condemned Indian and her cargo. Edward Ellice and Lord Suffield had not yet been adjudicated. However, Commodore Thomas Hardy, Commander-in-Chief on the South America Station, was present in HMS Superb and stated that he would not allow any of the property to be touched. An advice dated 8 August at Santiago de Chili reported that Edward Ellice and Lord Suffield had been restored, with their cargoes.

There is no record of Indian being restored, and she disappeared from online records.

== Citations ==
- Spears, John R. (1910). The story of the New England whalers. Macmillan.
