= Edward Ellice (1813 ship) =

History

United Kingdom
- Name: Edward Ellice
- Namesake: Edward Ellice
- Builder: St. Andrews, New Brunswick
- Launched: 1813
- Fate: Sold 1822

General characteristics
- Tons burthen: 461, or 475 (bm)

Edward Ellice was launched in New Brunswick in 1813 and sailed to England where she was re-registered. She was sold in 1822 in South America.

== Career ==
Edward Ellice was re-registered at London on 28 May 1813. She first appeared in Lloyd's Register (LR) in 1813 with J.Lenox, master, G.Inglis & Co., owners, and trade Liverpool–Quebec.

Year	Master	Owner	Trade	Source & notes
1815	W.Capes	Inglis & Co.	London–Yucatán	LR
1820	W.Stephenson	Soames & Co.	London–Cadiz	(LR)

Lloyd's List (LL) reported on 29 March 1821 that Edward Ellice, Heath, master, Lord Suffield, Brown, master, and Grant, Hogarth, master, had sailed from Cadiz in June 1820. They were then caught up in the conflict between Spain and the local independence movement in South America. The Chilean squadron had detained Edward Ellice and Lord Suffield at Callao; the Spanish authorities had seized Grant. The report listed a number of other vessels, British and American, such as Indian, that had also been detained by one side or the other.

A report in The Times stated that Lord Cochrane's squadron had captured and taken Edward Ellice and Lord Suffield into Huaco on 9 December 1820. The alleged cause of the capture was that the vessels had Spanish property aboard. The crews of the vessels joined Cochrane's squadron and the vessels were to be taken to Valparaiso for adjudication. (Note: Edward Ellice was, in fact, one of several vessels that agents in British and French ports of the Spanish government had chartered. The vessels listed does not include Lord Suffield, Grant, or Indian.)

Edward Ellice, Lord Suffield, and Indian, which Cochrane's squadron had detained, arrived at Valparaiso for adjudication on 1 March 1821. A later report was that the Prize Court at Valparaiso had condemned Indian and her cargo. Edward Ellice and Lord Suffield had not yet been adjudicated. However, Commodore Thomas Hardy, Commander-in-Chief on the South America Station, was present in HMS Superb and stated that he would not allow any of the property to be touched. An advice dated 8 August at Santiago de Chili reported that Edward Ellice and Lord Suffield had been restored, with their cargoes. On 15 September she sailed for the coast of Peru.

== Fate ==
Edward Ellice became Independencia del Sud. With Heath, master, she arrived at Callao from Guayaquil on 8 April 1822.
