= List of shipwrecks in July 1820 =

The list of shipwrecks in July 1820 includes ships sunk, wrecked or otherwise lost during July 1820.

== 1 July ==
List of shipwrecks: 1 July 1820
Ship	State	Description
Good intent	United Kingdom	The ship was wrecked on the Falsterbo Reef. Her crew were rescued. She was on a voyage from London to Vyborg, Grand Duchy of Finland.

== 6 July ==
List of shipwrecks: 6 July 1820
Ship	State	Description
HMS Carron	Royal Navy	The Cyrus-class post ship was wrecked on the coast of "Juggernaut" with the loss of twenty of her crew.
Robert Dewar	United Kingdom	The schooner was lost at Jamaica.

== 7 July ==
List of shipwrecks: 7 July 1820
Ship	State	Description
Agnes	United Kingdom	The ship was wrecked at Wreck Cove, Labrador, British North America. Her crew were rescued. She was on a voyage from Quebec, British North America to Greenock, Renfrewshire.

== 8 July ==
List of shipwrecks: 8 July 1820
Ship	State	Description
William Broughton	(United Kingdom of Great Britain and Ireland) New South Wales	The sloop was wrecked south of Botany Bay with the loss of three of her crew.

== 9 July ==
List of shipwrecks: 9 July 1820
Ship	State	Description
Duke	United Kingdom	The ship was sighted west of Götaland, Sweden on this date. No further trace, presumed foundered with the loss of all hands. She was on a voyage from Riga, Russia to London.
Gotha	(United Kingdom of Great Britain and Ireland) Bermuda	The ship was abandoned whilst on a voyage from Bermuda to Demerara. Her crew were rescued by Echo (United Kingdom).

== 10 July ==
List of shipwrecks: 10 July 1820
Ship	State	Description
Elizabeth	United Kingdom	The ship was driven ashore at Teignmouth, Devon.

== 11 July ==
List of shipwrecks: 11 July 1820
Ship	State	Description
Wanstead	United Kingdom	The ship was driven ashore and wrecked in Irvin's Bay, Grenada. Her crew were rescued. She was on a voyage from Grenada to London.
Wellington	United Kingdom	The ship was driven ashore in the Narrows, Kingston, Jamaica. She was on a voyage from Kingston to London. Wellington was refloated in mid-June and resumed her voyage.

== 13 July ==
List of shipwrecks: 13 July 1820
Ship	State	Description
Hermosa	Spain	The ship was lost in the Black River, Jamaica. All on board were rescued. She was on a voyage from Cartagena to Veracruz, Gran Colombia.

== 15 July ==
List of shipwrecks: 15 July 1820
Ship	State	Description
Amelia	United Kingdom	The ship was wrecked on Langlade Island, Miquelon. Her crew were rescued. She was on a voyage from Miramichi, New Brunswick, British North America to Port Rush, County Antrim.

== 16 July ==
List of shipwrecks: 16 July 1820
Ship	State	Description
Hope	United Kingdom	The ship was driven ashore on Rathlin Island, County Antrim. She was on a voyage from Belfast, County Antrim to Quebec City, Lower Canada, British North America. Hope was later refloated and put into Whitehaven, Cumberland, where she arrived on 21 July. She resumed her voyage the next day.

== 17 July ==
List of shipwrecks: 17 July 1820
Ship	State	Description
Mary Ann	United Kingdom	The ship ran aground at Whitby, Yorkshire. She was later refloated.
Ophelia	United Kingdom	The ship ran aground and sank near Whitby.
Sea Nymph	United Kingdom	The ship ran aground at Whitby. She was later refloated.
Thomas & Mary	United Kingdom	The ship ran aground at Whitby. She was later refloated.
Triton	United Kingdom	The ship sprang a leak and was abandoned in the Atlantic Ocean (49°20′N 38°30′W). She was on a voyage from Quebec, British North America to Hull, Yorkshire. Triton was subsequently taken in to Broadhaven Bay by HMS Fly (Royal Navy).

== 18 July ==
List of shipwrecks: 18 July 1820
Ship	State	Description
London	United Kingdom	The schooner was driven ashore and severely damaged at Teignmouth, Devon. She was on a voyage from Teignmouth to London.

== 19 July ==
List of shipwrecks: 19 July 1820
Ship	State	Description
Charlotte	United Kingdom	The ship ran aground on the Herd Sand, in the North Sea off South Shields, County Durham. Her crew were rescued by the South Shields Lifeboat. Charlotte was later refloated with some damage.

== 20 July ==
List of shipwrecks: 20 July 1820
Ship	State	Description
London	United Kingdom	The schooner was severely damaged on the Bench Rocks, in the English Channel off Teignmouth, Devon. She was on a voyage from Teignmouth to London.
Madelaine	(United Kingdom of Great Britain and Ireland) British North America	The schooner was abandoned at sea whilst on a voyage from Quebec to Saint Vincent. She came ashore on New Providence on 16 September.

== 21 July ==
List of shipwrecks: 21 July 1820
Ship	State	Description
Prosperity	United Kingdom	The brig was driven ashore and wrecked at Wells-next-the-Sea, Norfolk. She was on a voyage from Dram, Norway to London.

== 22 July ==
List of shipwrecks: 22 July 1820
Ship	State	Description
Marquess of Ely	British East India Company	The East Indiaman was last sighted in the Atlantic Ocean (31°20′S 34°20′E) whilst on a voyage from China to Saint Helena. Presumed subsequently foundered with the loss of all hands.

== 23 July ==
List of shipwrecks: 23 July 1820
Ship	State	Description
Atalanta	United Kingdom	The ship was driven ashore and severely damaged at Calais, France. All on board were rescued. She was on a voyage from Ramsgate, Kent to Calais.
Cynthia	United Kingdom	The ship was driven ashore on Neuwerk, Kingdom of Hanover She was on a voyage from London to Hamburg.> Cynthia was refloated on 25 July and taken in to Hamburg.

== 25 July ==
List of shipwrecks: 25 July 1820
Ship	State	Description
Piutus	United Kingdom	The ship was wrecked on the Domesnes Reef, in the Baltic Sea. Her crew survived. She was on a voyage from Riga, Russia to London.

== 27 July ==
List of shipwrecks: 27 July 1820
Ship	State	Description
Mercurius	Danzig	The ship was abandoned in the Dogger Bank. Her crew were rescued. She was on a voyage from Danzig to Amsterdam, North Holland, Netherlands.

== 30 July ==
List of shipwrecks: 30 July 1820
Ship	State	Description
Betty	United Kingdom	The ship struck the Red Rocks, Guernsey, Channel Islands and was damaged. She was on a voyage from Gothenburg, Sweden to Guernsey. Betty was later refloated and taken in to Guernsey.
Grant	United Kingdom	The ship departed from Gibraltar for San Blas. No further trace. There was an unconfirmed report in March 1821 that she had been seized off the coast of Peru.

== 31 July ==
List of shipwrecks: 31 July 1820
Ship	State	Description
Ceres	Netherlands	The ship was wrecked on the Wicklow Banks, in the Irish Sea. Her crew were rescued. She was on a voyage from Liverpool, Lancashire, United Kingdom to Antwerp.
Mary	United Kingdom	The humber keel foundered in the North Sea off Aldeburgh, Suffolk. Her crew were rescued by James (United Kingdom). She was on a voyage from Wisbech, Cambridgeshire to London.

== Unknown date ==
List of shipwrecks: Unknown date in July 1820
Ship	State	Description
Ariel	United Kingdom	The ship was driven ashore on Fair Isle before 20 July. She was on a voyage from South Shields, County Durham to an American port. Ariel was later refloated and taken in to Fair Isle.
Dispatch	United States	The ship was driven ashore at Aveiro, Portugal. She was on a voyage from Boston, Massachusetts to San Sebastián, Spain.
Emma	United Kingdom	The ship was wrecked off the Shetland Islands in early July.
Finchett	United Kingdom	The ship ran aground in the Ponoo River, Russia. She was on a voyage from Arkhangelsk, Russia to Liverpool, Lancashire. She was later refloated and taken in to Arkhangelsk, where she arrived on 27 July.
Nile	United Kingdom	The ship was driven ashore on Fair Isle before 20 July. She was on a voyage from South Shields to an American port. Nile was later refloated and taken in to Fair Isle.
William Ewart	United Kingdom	The ship foundered off Falmouth, Jamaica.
