= HMS Scamander =

Royal Navy fifth-rate frigate

- Plan of the Scamander-class frigates

History

United Kingdom
- Name: Scamander
- Namesake: Scamander
- Ordered: 4 May 1812
- Builder: Josiah & Thomas Brindley, Frindsbury
- Laid down: August 1812
- Launched: 13 July 1813
- Completed: 24 December 1813
- Commissioned: October 1813
- Fate: Sold 22 July 1819

General characteristics
- Class & type: Fifth-rate Scamander-class frigate
- Tons burthen: 941 (bm)
- Length: 143 ft 0 1/2 in (43.6 m) (upper deck); 119 ft 11 1/2 in (36.6 m) (keel)
- Beam: 38 ft 5 in (11.7 m)
- Draught: 8 ft 8 in (2.6 m) (forward); 12 ft 9 in (3.9 m) (aft)
- Depth of hold: 12 ft 4 in (3.8 m)
- Propulsion: Sails
- Complement: 284
- Armament: UD: 26 × 18-pounder guns; QD: 12 × 32-pounder carronades; Fc: 2 × 9-pounder guns + 2 × 32-pounder carronades

HMS Scamander was a 36-gun Scamander-class frigate of the Royal Navy. Commissioned in 1813 during the War of 1812 and Napoleonic Wars, the ship's initial services were in the English Channel, also including patrols in the Outer Hebrides and Bay of Biscay. Kept in commission after the wars had ended, in 1816 Scamander was sent to the Leeward Islands Station. There she spent two years on trade protection and anti-smuggling duties, seizing ten ships. Scamander was paid off upon her return in Britain in 1818 and sold in the following year.

== Design ==
Scamander was a 36-gun, 18-pounder fifth-rate Scamander-class frigate. The class was constructed as part of the reaction of Lord Melville's Admiralty to the beginning of the War of 1812. This new theatre of operations, with the Napoleonic Wars ongoing, was expected to put a strain on the existing fleet of Royal Navy frigates. Designed by the Surveyor of the Navy, Sir William Rule, the Scamander class was put into construction to fill this need. The class was a variant of the existing Apollo-class frigate, which had been the standard design for 36-gun frigates in the Royal Navy for over a decade. The class was particularly copied from the lines of the 36-gun frigate HMS Euryalus.

The war was expected to only be a short affair, and so ships built specifically for it were not designed for long service lives. As such Scamander's class was ordered to be constructed out of the soft but easily available "fir". This meant the use of red and yellow pine. Using pine for construction meant that the usually long period of time between keel laying and launching could be dramatically decreased to as little as three months. Pine-built ships could usually be differentiated from those of oak by their flat "square tuck" stern, but as copies of oak-built ships the Scamander class did not have this feature. The naval historian Robert Gardiner describes the class as an "austerity" version of the Apollos.

Pine was a lighter material than oak which allowed the ships to often sail faster than those built of the heavier wood, but this in turn meant that the ships required more ballast than usual to ensure that they sat at their designated waterline. Based on an oak-built design but with more ballast than that design was expected to carry, Scamander and her class were designed with a distinctly shallower depth in the hold. This ensured that the frigates were not adversely affected by the excess ballast, which could cause them to sail overly rigidly and without much give.

== Construction ==
The first seven ships of the Scamander class, six of which were ordered in May before the war had begun, were built with red pine. Scamander was one of these. The final three received yellow pine. All ships of the class were ordered to commercial shipyards rather than Royal Navy Dockyards, with the navy providing the pine for their construction from its own stocks. Scamander was ordered on 4 May 1812, to be built by the shipwrights Josiah and Thomas Brindley at Frindsbury. She was initially ordered under the name Lively, but this was changed on 11 December for her namesake the river Scamander. She was the only Royal Navy vessel to bear the name. The frigate was laid down in August, and launched on 13 July 1813 with the following dimensions: 143 feet 0 1/2 inch (43.6 m) along the upper deck, 119 feet 11 1/2 inches (36.6 m) at the keel, with a beam of 38 feet 5 inches (11.7 m) and a depth of hold of 12 feet 4 inches (3.8 m). The ship had a draught of 8 feet 8 inches (2.6 m) forward and 12 feet 9 inches (3.9 m) aft, and measured 941 tons burthen.

The fitting out process for Scamander was completed at Chatham Dockyard on 24 December 1813, after which she was sent to Sheerness Dockyard. The frigate originally had a complement of 274, but this was increased to 284 for her class on 26 January 1813, while she was under construction. Scamander held twenty-six 18-pounder long guns on her upper deck. Complementing this armament were twelve 32-pounder carronades on the quarterdeck, with two 9-pounder long guns and two additional 32-pounder carronades on the forecastle.

=== Characteristics ===
Frigates of the Scamander class were reported by crews to handle well, being manoeuvrable and fast especially when off the wind. The decreased depth of the hold, which promoted these characteristics, also meant that the frigates were unable to carry more than three months of provisions in the assigned space. If the ships needed to be at sea for as much as six months then water supplies had to be sacrificed to provide space for the food. Scamander was recorded on 13 November 1818 as being able to reach speeds of 12.5 knots (23.2 km/h).

== Service ==
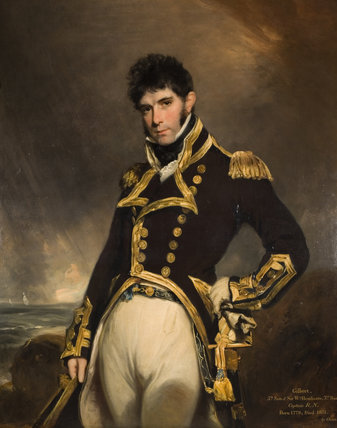
Gilbert Heathcote was Scamander's first captain

Scamander was commissioned under the command of Captain Gilbert Heathcote in October 1813. Under Heathcote the ship served in the English Channel. By February 1814 Scamander was patrolling the Outer Hebrides, and by February 1815 she was based at Plymouth. She returned there from duties in the Bay of Biscay on 13 July. With the Napoleonic Wars having ended, Captain Sir John Louis assumed command of Scamander on 26 August. The ship spent this period of time based at Sheerness, having been flagged for continued service on the peacetime naval establishment.

Captain Charles Hawtayne replaced Louis in command of Scamander on 15 January 1816. While the ship was undergoing a refit in preparation for service on the Leeward Islands Station, Hawtayne's wife died and on 8 April he exchanged commands with Captain William Elliot.

Under Elliot Scamander sailed from Portsmouth on 24 May to join the Leeward Islands Station. There the ship was employed protecting British mercantile trade and enforcing the Navigation Acts. Smuggling was rife between Martinique and Saint Vincent. During her time on the station, Scamander seized ten ships including a British schooner found sailing with contraband off Martinique. Elliot subsequently complained to the Board of Trade that several of the vessels he had taken had been restored to their owners by Vice admiralty courts, and in other cases he had to pay the legal fees himself to ensure condemnation.

Scamander was sailing off Barbados on 21 October 1817 when the island was hit by a hurricane; having survived it, the ship rescued several ships that had been wrecked in Carlisle Bay, for which Elliot was thanked by the Barbados merchant community. Scamander was sent to Güiria in August 1818 to request that the Spanish authorities there release two British ships they had detained. With the Venezuelan War of Independence underway, when Scamander arrived the Venezuelan naval officer Luis Brión was preparing to attack the settlement. With the Spanish having already refused to give up the British ships, Brión agreed that if Scamander waited out his assault, he would then return the vessels. The Venezuelan attack succeeded in the night of 24 August, with Scamander anchored away as an observer. Brión then gave up the two seized ships to Elliot. For this duty he was subsequently thanked by the merchants of Trinidad.

Having completed her period of West Indies service, Scamander sailed from the Leeward Islands carrying dispatches and arrived at Portsmouth Dockyard on 28 October. The ship was paid off in November and sold to John Small Sedger of Rotherhithe on 22 July 1819, for £3,010 (equivalent to £228,884 in 2025).
