= Cyfarthfa High School =

School in Merthyr Tydfil, UK

Coordinates: 51.749°N 3.369°W

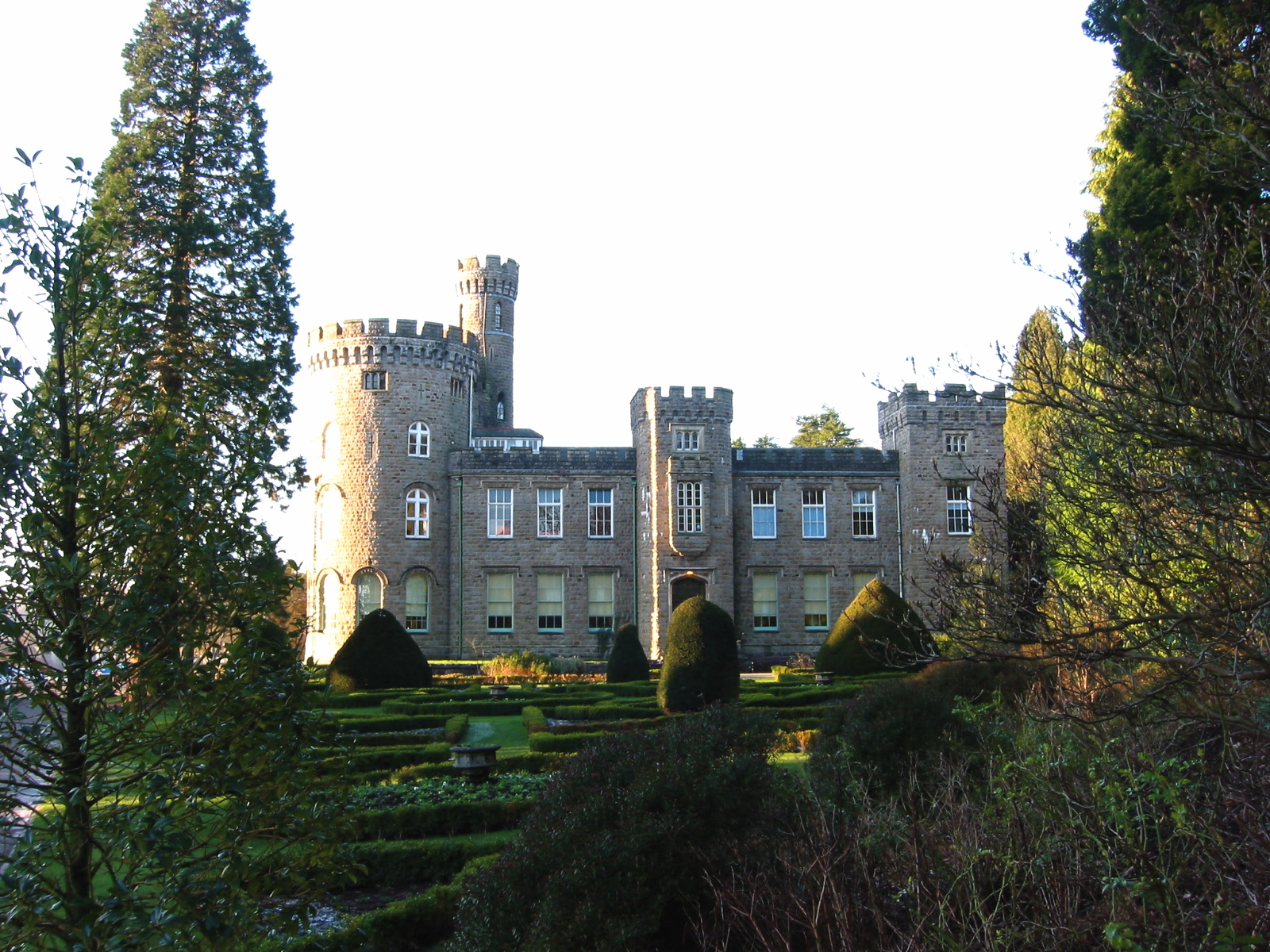
- Cyfarthfa Castle housed the school until 1981

Information
- Established: 1970; 56 years ago

Cyfarthfa High School is a comprehensive school, based in Merthyr Tydfil County Borough, Wales, that was established in 1970. Cyfarthfa means "Place of the barking (dog)" in Welsh and the school crest reflects this.

== Origins ==
The school was formed by the amalgamation of Cyfarthfa Castle Grammar School and Georgetown Secondary Modern School. Cyfarthfa Grammar School, opened in 1913, was based in Cyfarthfa Castle operating as separate boys' and girls' schools. In 1945, they amalgamated, and in accordance with the then government policy the school was redesignated as a Grammar school under the name of Cyfarthfa Castle Grammar School. Georgetown Secondary Modern School was located at Georgetown, Merthyr Tydfil.

=== Upper School ===
Initially, the Upper School was located in the Grammar School premises at Cyfarthfa Castle. The Upper School moved to a new campus in Cae Mari Dwn in 1981.

The new site is based a few miles away from the lower school and provides a range of purpose based facilities. It has a brick built building with a hall and external playing fields. The two storey site includes a dedicated science wing, sports hall, a range of general purpose classrooms, a flood-lit Astroturf.

=== Lower School ===
The original lower school was situated in Georgetown, Merthyr Tydfil. At that site it had two wings plus an annex providing science and metalwork facilities. External portable units provided woodwork and language labs. In 1981 the Lower School relocated to the Cyfarthfa Castle site, vacated by the Upper School. The lower school was also later vacated in 2013, leaving the school disused

The current Lower School premises are within a park with considerable grounds and gardens as well as a museum and swimming pool.

== Notable alumni ==
- Merryl Wyn Davies, scholar, writer and broadcaster
- Philip Madoc, actor
- Ursula Masson, academic and writer

== See also ==
- Cyfarthfa Castle
