= HMS Attack (1794) =

Naval brig (1794–1802)

History

Great Britain
- Name: HMS Attack
- Ordered: 6 March 1794
- Builder: John Wilson & Co., Frindsbury
- Laid down: March 1794
- Launched: 28 June 1794
- Commissioned: February 1795
- Fate: Sold September 1802

General characteristics
- Class & type: Conquest-class gunvessel
- Tons burthen: 147 (bm)
- Length: Overall: 75 ft 0 1/2 in (22.9 m); Keel: 62 ft 2 1/2 in (19.0 m)
- Beam: 21 ft 1 1/4 in (6.4 m)
- Draught: 7 ft 0 1/4 in (2.1 m)
- Complement: 50
- Armament: 10 × 18-pounder carronades + 2 × 24–pounder bow + 2 × 4-pounder stern chase guns

HMS Attack was launched in 1794 as a Conquest-class gunvessel for the Royal Navy. She had an uneventful career and the Navy sold her in 1802.

== Career ==
Lieutenant Thomas Eyre Hinton commissioned Attack in February 1795. In 1795 she served in Sir Sidney Smith's inshore squadron.

HMS Diamond, Syren, Sybille, Childers, and the gun-brigs Fearless and Attack shared in the proceeds of the capture on 6 July 1795 of the Latitia.

Between July and October 1796 Attack was at Portsmouth being coppered and receiving sliding keels.

Lieutenant Joseph James took command in 1798. Attack spent 1799 escorting convoys in the Channel. In April she recaptured William, Rowell, master, which had been sailing from Newry to London when a French privateer had captured her.

On 14 August 1800, Attack sent into Plymouth Christian, Odding, master, which had been sailing from Bordeaux to Hamburg.

== Fate ==
Attack was paid off in 1801. She was sold at Sheerness in September 1802.

== Crew ==
John Toup Nicolas began his naval career on Attack.
