= HMS Alpheus =

Royal Navy fifth-rate frigate

- Plan of the Scamander-class frigates

History

United Kingdom
- Name: Alpheus
- Ordered: 7 December 1812
- Laid down: July 1813
- Launched: 6 April 1814
- Completed: 11 July 1814
- Commissioned: 14 May 1814
- Out of service: 31 December 1816
- Fate: Sold 10 September 1817

General characteristics
- Class & type: Fifth-rate Scamander-class frigate
- Tons burthen: 949 (bm)
- Length: 143 ft 4 3/4 in (43.7 m) (upper deck); 120 ft 2 3/8 in (36.6 m) (keel)
- Beam: 38 ft 6 1/2 in (11.7 m)
- Draught: 9 ft (2.7 m) (forward); 12 ft 8 in (3.9 m) (aft)
- Depth of hold: 12 ft 4 in (3.8 m)
- Propulsion: Sails
- Complement: 284
- Armament: UD: 26 × 18-pounder guns; QD: 12 × 32-pounder carronades; Fc: 2 × 9-pounder guns + 2 × 32-pounder carronades

HMS Alpheus was a 36-gun Scamander-class frigate of the Royal Navy. Commissioned in May 1814, the ship was sent to serve on the East Indies Station. She served mostly uneventfully at Macao and Manila; in the latter location the ship's captain was discovered by the Spanish to be using his barge to smuggle dollars. In December 1815 the ship was deemed to be in such bad condition with rot that she was sent home, described by William Henry Dillon, captain of an accompanying vessel, as "in a very crazy state". Having received a refit at Bombay, Alpheus returned to England in December 1816 and saw no further service. The frigate was paid off and then sold at Sheerness in the following year.

== Design ==
Alpheus was a 36-gun, 18-pounder fifth-rate Scamander-class frigate. The class was constructed as part of the reaction of Lord Melville's Admiralty to the beginning of the War of 1812. This new theatre of operations, with the Napoleonic Wars ongoing, was expected to put a strain on the existing fleet of Royal Navy frigates, and so more were needed to be built. Designed by the Surveyor of the Navy, Sir William Rule, the Scamander class was one of those put into construction to fill this need. The class was a variant of the existing Apollo-class frigate, which had been the standard design for 36-gun frigates in the Royal Navy for over a decade. The class was particularly copied from the lines of the 36-gun frigate HMS Euryalus.

The war was expected to only be a short affair, and so ships built specifically for it were not designed for long service lives. As such Alpheus's class was ordered to be constructed out of the soft but easily available "fir". This meant the use of red and yellow pine. Using pine for construction meant that the usually long period of time between keel laying and launching could be dramatically decreased to as little as three months. Pine-built ships could usually be differentiated from those of oak by their flat "square tuck" stern, but as copies of oak-built ships the Scamander class did not have this feature. The naval historian Robert Gardiner describes the class as an "austerity" version of the Apollos.

Pine was a lighter material than oak which allowed the ships to often sail faster than those built of the heavier wood, but this in turn meant that the ships required more ballast than usual to ensure that they sat at their designated waterline. Based on an oak-built design but with more ballast than that design was expected to carry, Alpheus and her class were designed with a distinctly shallower depth in the hold. This ensured that the frigates were not adversely affected by the excess ballast, which could cause them to sail overly rigidly and without much give.

== Construction ==
The first seven ships of the Scamander class, six of which were ordered in May before the war had begun, were built with red pine. The final three, of which Alpheus was the last, received yellow pine. All ships of the class were ordered to commercial shipyards rather than Royal Navy Dockyards, with the navy providing the pine for their construction from its own stocks. Alpheus was ordered on 7 December 1812, to be built by the shipwright William Wallis at Blackwall, London. The frigate was laid down in July the following year, and launched on 6 April 1814 with the following dimensions: 143 feet 4 3/4 inches (43.7 m) along the upper deck, 120 feet 2 3/8 inches (36.6 m) at the keel, with a beam of 38 feet 6 1/2 inches (11.7 m) and a depth of hold of 12 feet 4 inches (3.8 m). The ship had a draught of 9 feet (2.7 m) forward and 12 feet 8 inches (3.9 m) aft, and measured 949 tons burthen.

The fitting out process for Alpheus was completed at Woolwich Dockyard on 11 July. The frigate originally had a crew complement of 274, but this was increased to 284 for the entire class on 26 January 1813, while she was under construction. Alpheus held twenty-six 18-pounder long guns on her upper deck. Complimenting this armament were twelve 32-pounder carronades on the quarterdeck, with two 9-pounder long guns and two additional 32-pounder carronades on the forecastle.

== Service ==
Alpheus was commissioned under Captain George Langford on 14 May 1814, by which time the Bourbon Restoration in France had occurred. She was ordered to join the East Indies Station, one of the ships assigned to keep the station at war establishment levels. The frigate formed part of the escort to a convoy of merchant ships as she made her way to the station, doing so alongside the 18-gun brig-sloop HMS Penguin and 12-gun brig HMS Swinger. They departed from Portsmouth on 1 September.

Having reached Calcutta Alpheus sailed on to Ceylon, arriving there on 4 May 1815. By July the frigate was serving at Macao, from where she transported the East India Company employee Thomas Pattle to Manila so that he could recover from dropsy. Pattle's condition in fact worsened at Manila, and in August Langford conveyed him back to Macao before returning to the Philippines to be again stationed at Manila. About this time the Spanish authorities at Manila caught Langford using his ship's barge to smuggle dollars. The barge was captured by several armed launches, after which Langford was known to the Spanish as "the Captain of the Dollars".

While sailing off Luzon on 13 November Alpheus encountered the 38-gun frigate HMS Horatio, whose crew was beset with sickness. The two ships raced to test their capabilities, and found Horatio to be the faster vessel. Langford then guided Horatio in to Manila where the Spanish provided hospital treatment to the crew. Alpheus continued in Manila Bay through the next month, during which time the frigate was surveyed and found to be in poor condition. Langford decided to refit the ship and then return to England, as the war establishment in the East Indies was coming to an end.

Alpheus received her refit at Bombay, and began her passage to England on 12 May 1816. She then spent some time at Mauritius weathering storms off the coast of Africa, as her rotten timbers would have made sailing through them very dangerous. The frigate left the island on 14 August and made for the Cape of Good Hope. While doing so she encountered Horatio on 20 August, whose commander Captain William Henry Dillon described Alpheus as "in a very crazy state" despite the refit. The two ships chose to sail together to the Cape. Alpheus's hull was in a bad state, and while making the journey Langford kept the ship at a slow pace to avoid damaging it further, as a result of which Horatio sailed on alone on 27 August. Alpheus arrived at Simon's Town on 7 September, a day after Horatio. She spent the next twenty days there.

From the Cape Alpheus transported 150 sheep to the garrison at Saint Helena, arriving on 13 October. While there some of Alpheus's passengers were allowed a meeting with Napoleon. She departed four days later, taking despatches with her. Alpheus arrived at Spithead on 5 December before sailing to Deal, Kent, four days later. She was subsequently paid off at Sheerness Dockyard on 31 December. Amongst the cargo brought from the East Indies by the ship was part of a Persepolis relief, wall stones from Babylon, a portrait of Arthur Wellesley, 1st Duke of Wellington, an Arabian horse, and a tortoise. Alpheus was surveyed and ordered to be either sold or broken up. The frigate was put up for sale by the Admiralty on 19 August 1817 and sold for £2,320 to Bailey & Co. on 10 September.
