= HMS Orontes (1813) =

Frigate of the Royal Navy

History

United Kingdom
- Name: HMS Orontes
- Ordered: 4 May 1812
- Builder: Josiah & Thomas Brindley, Frindsbury
- Laid down: August 1812
- Launched: 29 June 1813
- Completed: 13 December 1813
- Renamed: Originally ordered as HMS Brilliant
- Fate: Broken up in April 1817

General characteristics
- Class & type: Scamander-class frigate
- Tons burthen: 939 bm
- Length: 142 ft 10.5 in (43.548 m) (gundeck); 119 ft 9.5 in (36.513 m) (keel)
- Beam: 38 ft 4.75 in (11.7031 m)
- Depth of hold: 12 ft 4 in (3.76 m)
- Sail plan: Full-rigged ship
- Crew: 284
- Armament: Upper deck: 26 × 18pdrs; Quarterdeck: 12 × 32pdr carronades; Forecastle: 2 × 9pdrs + 2 × 32pdr carronades

HMS Orontes was a 36-gun Scamander-class fifth rate frigate of the Royal Navy. She was built at Frindsbury as Brilliant, but was renamed in 1812. She was launched in 1813. Her first commander was Captain Nathaniel Day Cochrane, who served on the Irish Station. She was later under Captain William M’Culloch, who may have taken her to the West Indies.

On 31 January 1815 Lloyd's List reported that Orontes was one of the escorts of a fleet that had left St Thomas on 11 December 1814.

On 18 February 1817, Lloyd's List reported that Orontes, just arrived at Portsmouth, had spoken with Grant at 1°32′N 17°15′W, out 110 days on her voyage from Madras to England.

Orontes was broken up at Sheerness in April 1817.
