= Scamander-class frigate =

Class overview
- Operators: Royal Navy
- Completed: 10

General characteristics
- Type: Fifth-rate frigate
- Tons burthen: 930 25/94 (as designed)
- Length: 143 ft (44 m) (gundeck); 120 ft 0.75 in (36.5951 m) (keel)
- Beam: 38 ft 2 in (11.63 m)
- Draught: 12 ft 4 in (3.76 m)
- Propulsion: Sail
- Sail plan: Full-rigged ship
- Complement: 274 (later raised to 284 from 1813).
- Armament: UD: 26 × 18-pounder guns; QD: 2 × 9-pounder guns + 12 × 32-pounder carronades; FC: 2 × 9-pounder guns + 2 × 32-pounder carronades

The Scamander class were a series of ten 36-gun sailing frigates, all built by contract with private shipbuilders to an 1812 design by Sir William Rule, which served in the Royal Navy during the late Napoleonic War and War of 1812.

They were all built of "fir" (actually, pine), selected as a stop-gap measure because of the urgent need to build ships quickly, with the Navy Board supplying red pine timber to the contractors from dockyard stocks for the first seven ships. The last three were built of yellow pine. While quick to build, the material was not expected to last as long as oak-built ships, and indeed all were deleted by 1819, except the Tagus which lasted to 1822.

== Ships in class ==
Red pine group. These seven ships were originally ordered under the names Liffey, Brilliant, Lively, Severn, Blonde, Forth and Greyhound, all being renamed on 11 December 1812 (except Liffey and Severn, which were renamed on 26 January 1813).

- HMS Eridanus (ex-Liffey)
  - Builder: Mrs Mary Ross, Rochester
  - Ordered: 4 May 1812
  - Laid down: August 1812
  - Launched: 1 May 1813
  - Completed: 13 July 1813 at Chatham Dockyard
  - Fate: Sold 29 January 1818
- HMS Orontes (ex-Brilliant)
  - Builder: Josiah & Thomas Brindley, Frindsbury
  - Ordered: 4 May 1812
  - Laid down: August 1812
  - Launched: 29 June 1813
  - Completed: 13 December 1813 at Chatham Dockyard
  - Fate: Broken up at Sheerness in April 1817
- HMS Scamander (ex-Lively)
  - Builder: Josiah & Thomas Brindley, Frindsbury
  - Ordered: 4 May 1812
  - Laid down: August 1812
  - Launched: 13 July 1813
  - Completed: 24 December 1813 at Chatham Dockyard
  - Fate: Sold 22 July 1819
- HMS Tagus (ex-Severn)
  - Builder: Daniel List, Binstead, Isle of Wight
  - Ordered: 4 May 1812
  - Laid down: August 1812
  - Launched: 14 July 1813
  - Completed: 9 November 1813 at Portsmouth Dockyard
  - Fate: Sold 19 April 1822
- HMS Ister (ex-Blonde)
  - Builder: William Wallis, Leamouth
  - Ordered: 4 May 1812
  - Laid down: August 1812
  - Launched: 14 July 1813
  - Completed: 11 November 1813 at Woolwich Dockyard
  - Fate: Sold 8 March 1819
- HMS Tigris (ex-Forth)
  - Builder: John Pelham, Frindsbury, Kent
  - Ordered: 4 May 1812
  - Laid down: September 1812
  - Launched: 26 June 1813
  - Completed: 24 December 1813 at Chatham Dockyard
  - Fate: Sold 11 June 1818
- HMS Euphrates (ex-Greyhound)
  - Builder: John King, Upnor, Kent
  - Ordered: 12 October 1812
  - Laid down: January 1813
  - Launched: 8 November 1813
  - Completed: 24 September 1814 at Chatham Dockyard
  - Fate: Sold 29 January 1818

Yellow pine group.

- HMS Hebrus
  - Builder: John Barton, Limehouse
  - Ordered: 16 November 1812
  - Laid down: January 1813
  - Launched: 13 September 1813
  - Completed: 18 December 1813 at Deptford Dockyard
  - Fate: Sold 3 April 1817
- HMS Granicus
  - Builder: John Barton, Limehouse
  - Ordered: 17 November 1812
  - Laid down: January 1813
  - Launched: 25 October 1813
  - Completed: 31 January 1814 at Deptford Dockyard
  - Fate: Sold 3 April 1817
- HMS Alpheus
  - Builder: William Wallis, Leamouth
  - Ordered: 7 December 1812
  - Laid down: July 1813
  - Launched: 6 April 1814
  - Completed: 11 July 1814 at Woolwich Dockyard
  - Fate: Sold 10 September 1817
