= Nicholas Harris Nicolas =

English antiquary (1799–1848)

Sir (Nicholas) Harris Nicolas GCMG KH (10 March 1799 – 3 August 1848) was an English antiquary.

== Life ==
The fourth son of Commander John Harris Nicolas RN (1758–1844) and Margaret (née Blake), he was born at Dartmouth. He was the brother of Rear Admiral John Toup Nicolas RN CB KH; 1st Lt Paul Harris Nicolas RM; and Lt Keigwin Nicholas RN.

Having served in the navy from 1812 to 1816, he studied law and was called to the bar at the Inner Temple in 1825. His work as a barrister was confined principally to peerage cases before the House of Lords, and he devoted the rest of his time to the study of genealogy and history.

In 1831, he was made a knight of the Royal Guelphic Order, and, in 1832, chancellor and Knight Commander of the Order of St Michael and St George (KCMG), being advanced to Grand Cross of the order in 1840. He became a member of the council of the Society of Antiquaries in 1826, but soon began to criticise the management of the Society's affairs, and withdrew in 1828. He was elected a member of the American Antiquarian Society in 1838.

He criticised the Record Commission, which he regarded as too expensive. These attacks, which brought him into controversy with Francis Palgrave, led in 1836 to the appointment of a select committee to inquire into the public records. Nicolas was also responsible for several reforms at the British Museum.

In 1822, he married Sarah (d. 1867), daughter of John Davison of Loughton, Essex, a reputed descendant of the Tudor statesman William Davison. They had two sons and six daughters. Financial difficulties compelled Nicolas to leave England, and he died near Boulogne.

== Works ==
The most important of Nicolas' works is his History of the Orders of Knighthood of the British Empire; of the Order of the Guelphs; and of Medals, Clasps, &c., for Naval and Military Services (London, 1841–1842), which was the first attempt to write a general history of the British honours. Among his numerous other writings are:

- The Chronology of History (London, 1833)
- Life of William Davison (London, 1823); Nicholas Harris Nicolas, Life of William Davison: Secretary of State and Privy Counsellor to Queen Elizabeth, Nichols (1823)
- Synopsis of the Peerage of England (London, 1825)
- Life and Times of Sir Christopher Hatton (London, 1847)
- an uncompleted History of the Royal Navy (London, 1847).

He edited Proceedings and Ordinances of the Privy Council of England, 1386–1542 (London, 1834–1837), and (with the help of Nelson's daughter Horatia) Dispatches and Letters of Lord Nelson (London, 1844–1846); wrote lives of Geoffrey Chaucer, Robert Burns, William Cowper, William Collins, Henry Kirke White and others for Pickering's Aldine Press edition of the poets; lives of Izaak Walton and Charles Cotton for an edition of The Compleat Angler illustrated by James Inskipp; and several elaborate works on genealogical and kindred subjects printed for private circulation only.
