= Ursula Masson =

Welsh academic

Ursula Masson (1945–2008), born Ursula O'Connor, was a Welsh academic and writer who worked closely with Jane Aaron and Honno Press/Gwasg Honno, the Welsh Women's Press, on the imprint Welsh Women's Classics – to bring back into print the works of forgotten Welsh women writers of the 19th and 20th centuries.

Her areas of study included Welsh social history, the political history of Welsh women from 1800 to 1914, and the history of liberalism in Wales.

== Early life and education ==
Ursula Masson was born into the Irish community of Merthyr Tydfil, whose history she researched for her master's degree at University of Keele. She attended Cyfarthfa Castle Grammar School and Cardiff University. Masson had commenced doctoral research into women's Liberal Associations in Wales prior to her death, and her thesis was published posthumously.

== Career ==
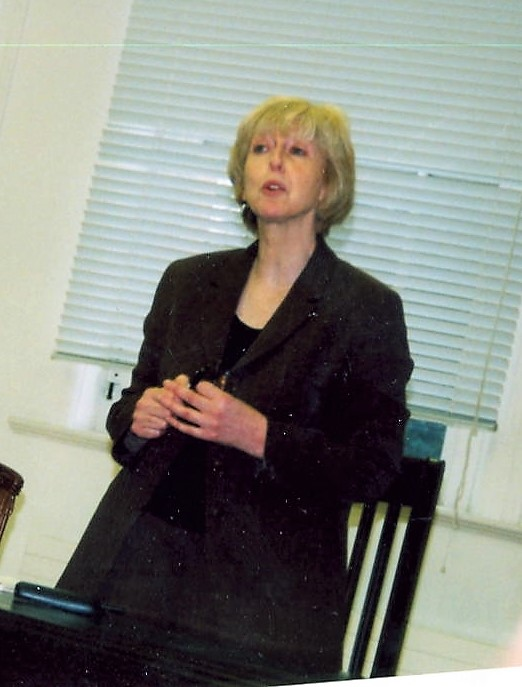
Ursula Masson, International Women's Day, 8 March 2003, The Old Library, Cardiff

After graduating with her MA, she worked as a journalist in South Wales and Australia, before returning to teach adults in Swansea. In 1994 she became a lecturer in history at the University of Glamorgan (which subsequently became part of the University of South Wales).

In 1998 Masson and Welsh historian Deirdre Beddoe founded Archif Menywod Cymru / Women's Archive Wales. Masson was also a committee member of the South-West Group of the Women's History Network (later renamed South West and Wales Group), and co-edited Llafur, the journal of Llafur: The Welsh People's History Society. During a long period as Chair of Archif Menywod Cymru / Women's Archive Wales, she proposed holding a series of Wales Women's history roadshows. People would be invited to bring material relating to the social history of women's lives, which were deposited in many cases in public archive collections in Wales, or were photographed or scanned. The results later became part of The People's Collection Wales.

She established what became the Centre for Gender Studies in Wales at University of South Wales. Her students described her as an "inspirational" teacher. Whilst teaching and organizing, she continued with her own research, editing the Aberdare Women's Liberal Association 1891–1910 papers, and completing a doctorate entitled For Women, for Wales and for Liberalism: Women in Liberal Politics in Wales, 1880–1914, which was published posthumously by the University of Wales Press:

"This is a wonderful work of reconstruction from difficult sources. Ursula Masson makes a vital contribution to several aspects of modern Welsh history and provides a key part of the story of the women's suffrage movement in Wales, a dimension that enhances recent research on campaigning pressure groups in Wales. It combines general analysis for the whole of Wales with intense, fascinating studies of the contrasting communities of Cardiff and Aberdare. The work behind these is as thorough, and as revealing, as an archaeological dig," according to Neil Evans of Cardiff University.

"For those of us who had the privilege of knowing her, it won't be the teacher or researcher or organizer we're primarily grieving, however, but the friend who always seemed to have space for people, and warmth and humour to give them, though she was so busy, and though, since 2001, she was fighting serious illness. In her final years she gave us an extraordinary example of the way in which the human spirit can with dignity and grace face up to the worst trials. It is for us now to treasure the records she has left us of her own life and work, which are every bit as valiant and inspiring as those of the Welsh heroines she researched" (Jane Aaron).

== Legacy ==
The public Ursula Masson Memorial Lecture on the subject of gender studies is given annually at the Centre for Gender Studies in Wales at University of South Wales. The Centre also awards the Ursula Masson Memorial Prize annually for the best undergraduate dissertation in women’s or gender history. A Purple Plaque was installed at Merthyr Tydfil Central Library on 8 March 2019 to commemorate her life and achievements.

== Publications ==
- For Women, for Wales and for Liberalism: Women in Liberal Politics in Wales, 1800-1914, Ursula Masson, University of Wales Press, 2010

Masson edited two books in the Honno Classics series:

- A Woman's Work is Never Done by Elizabeth Andrews, edited and introduced by Ursula Masson, Honno Press, 2006
- The Very Salt of Life: Welsh Women's Political Writings from Chartism to Suffrage, edited and introduced by Jane Aaron and Ursula Masson, Honno Press, 2007
