= HMS Crane (1809) =

Brig-sloop of the Royal Navy

- Crane

History

United Kingdom
- Name: HMS Crane
- Ordered: 5 November 1808
- Builder: Josiah & Thomas Brindley, Frindsbury
- Laid down: December 1808
- Launched: 27 September 1809
- Fate: Foundered December 1813

General characteristics
- Type: Cruizer-class brig-sloop
- Tons burthen: 385 55/94 bm
- Length: 100 ft 0 in (30.5 m) (overall); 77 ft 3 1/2 in (23.6 m) (keel)
- Beam: 30 ft 7 1/2 in (9.3 m)
- Depth of hold: 12 ft 9 in (3.9 m)
- Propulsion: Sails
- Sail plan: Brig
- Complement: 121
- Armament: 16 × 32-pounder carronades + 2 × 6-pounder bow guns

HMS Crane was a Royal Navy Cruizer-class brig-sloop launched in 1809. She had an unusually uneventful five-year career before she foundered in 1814.

She was commissioned in September 1809 under Cmdr. James Stuart for the Irish station. Stuart captured two American vessels, Asia of Boston and Washington of Marblehead, on their way home from Archangel. He brought the crews into Horta, in the Azores, and released them to John B. Dabney, the American consul, who repatriated them. It is not at all clear why Stuart had detained the Americans.

In August 1811 Commander William Haydon took temporary command and sailed her for the Leeward Islands on 29 September 1812. On 13 December 1812, she collided with the British merchant ship Robert Augustus, which was on a voyage from Barbados to Surinam; Robert Augustus sank without loss of life. Crane's next captain was Commander Thomas Forrest. In December 1813 Commander Robert Standly became her captain.

On 4 April 1814 Crane chased the American privateer Chasseur, of 14 guns and 135 men, off St Kitts, but was unable to capture her.

Crane was lost, presumed foundered with all hands, in September 1814 while en route from Bermuda to Canada.
