= James Inskipp =

English painter (1790–1868)

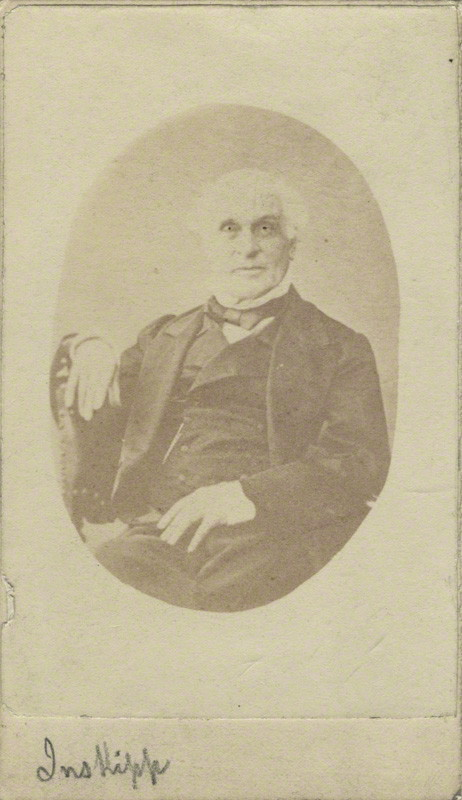
- Inskipp in the 1860s
- Born: 1790
- Died: 15 March 1868 (aged 77–78); Godalming, Surrey

James Inskipp (1790 – 15 March 1868) was a British painter and illustrator. He started successfully painting when he retired. He exhibited in London and illustrated a version of the Compleat Angler.

== Life ==
Inskipp was born in 1790 and does not come to notice until he retires from the commissariat service when he was about 30 years old. He started to paint and successfully exhibited at the Royal Academy, the British Institution and the Society of British Artists.

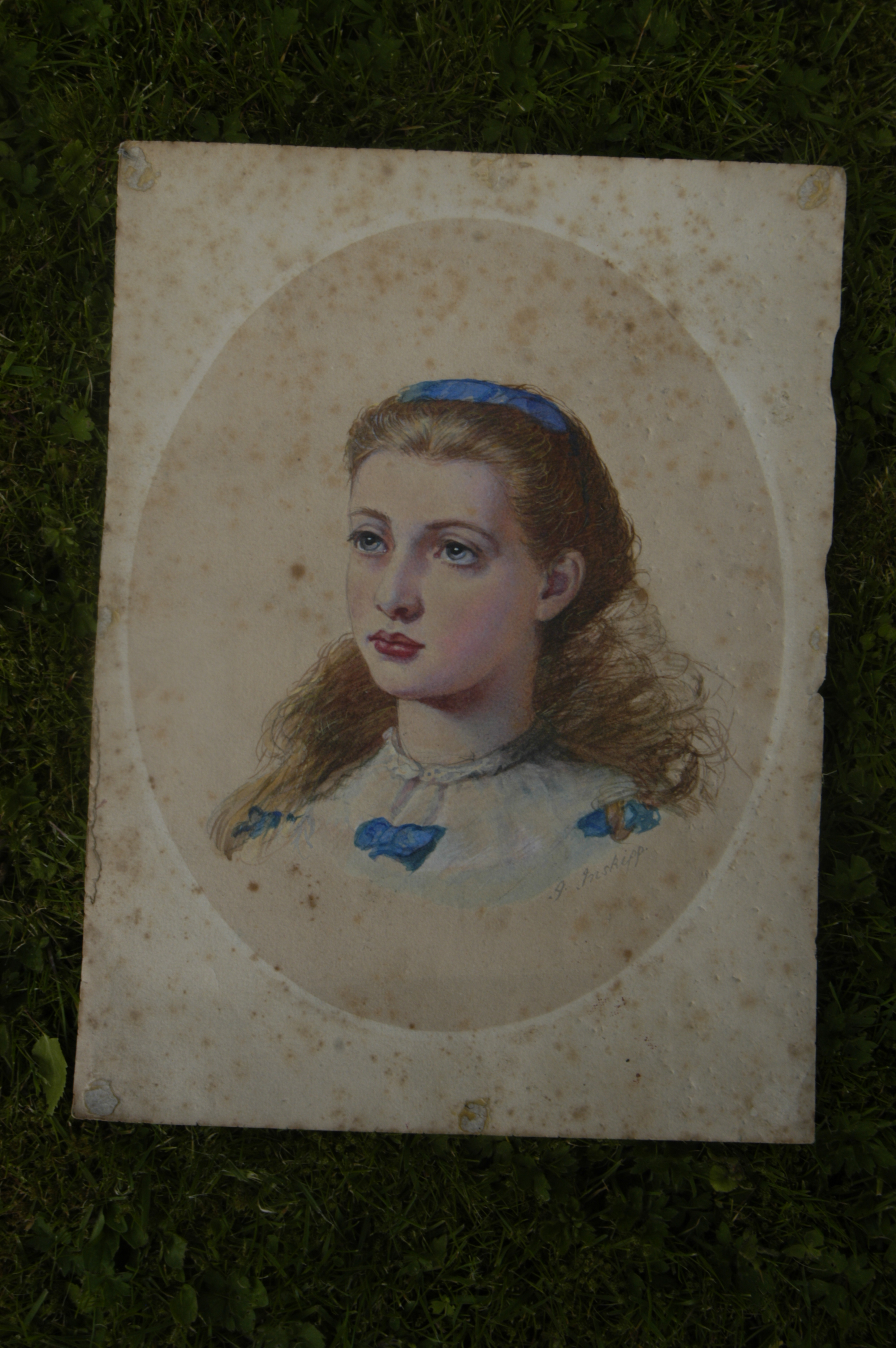
Portrait of a girl by James Inskipp, watercolour.

Between 1833 and 1836 Sir Nicholas Harris Nicolas published an edition of the Compleat Angler by Isaac Walton which was illustrated by Inskipp. This book contained a portrait of Walton

== Death and legacy ==
Inskipp died at his home at Cattshall Lane in Godalming in 1868. Inskipp has paintings at Cyfarthfa Castle's Museum & Art Gallery and in the British Government Art Collection.

== Gallery ==
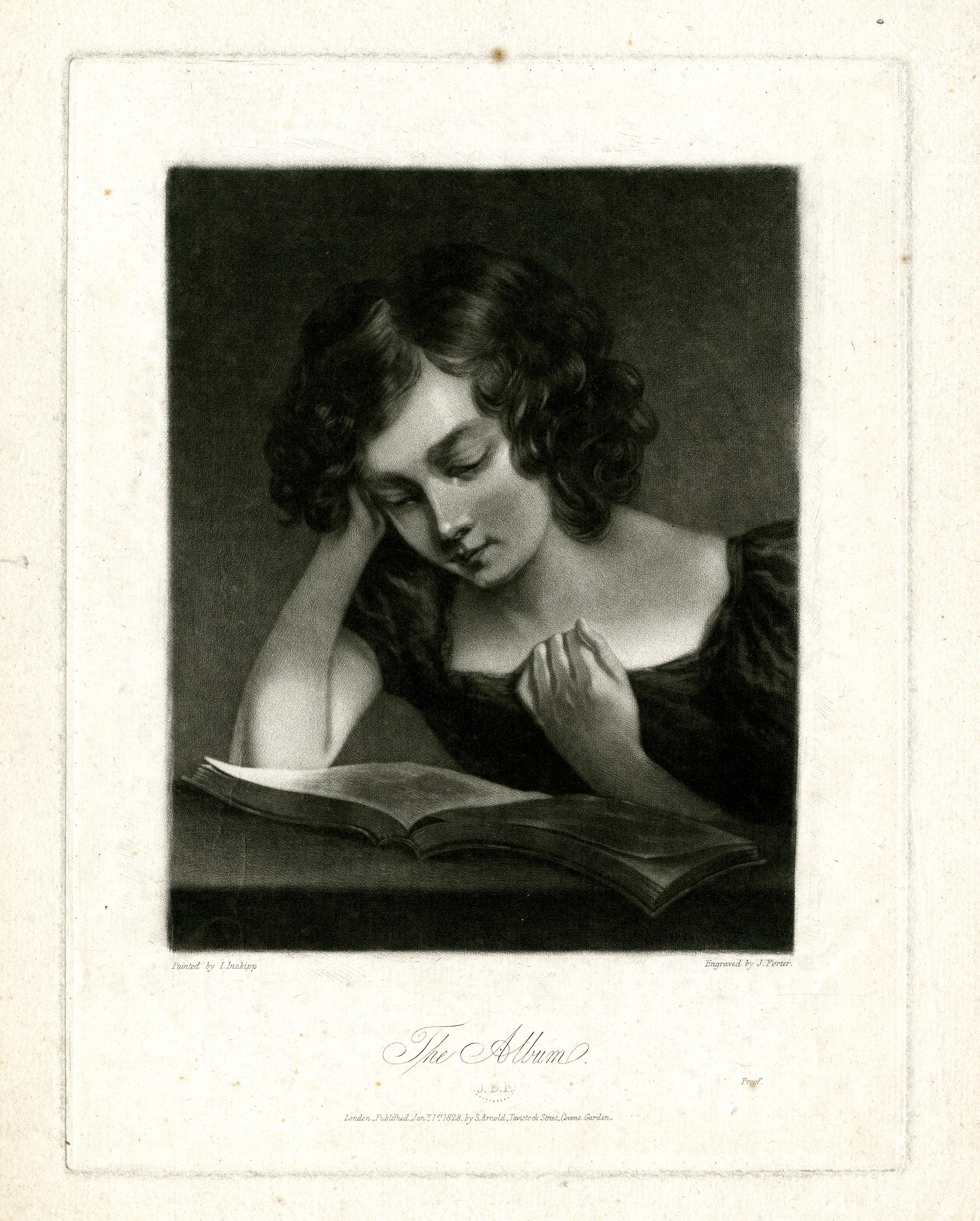
The Album, 1828

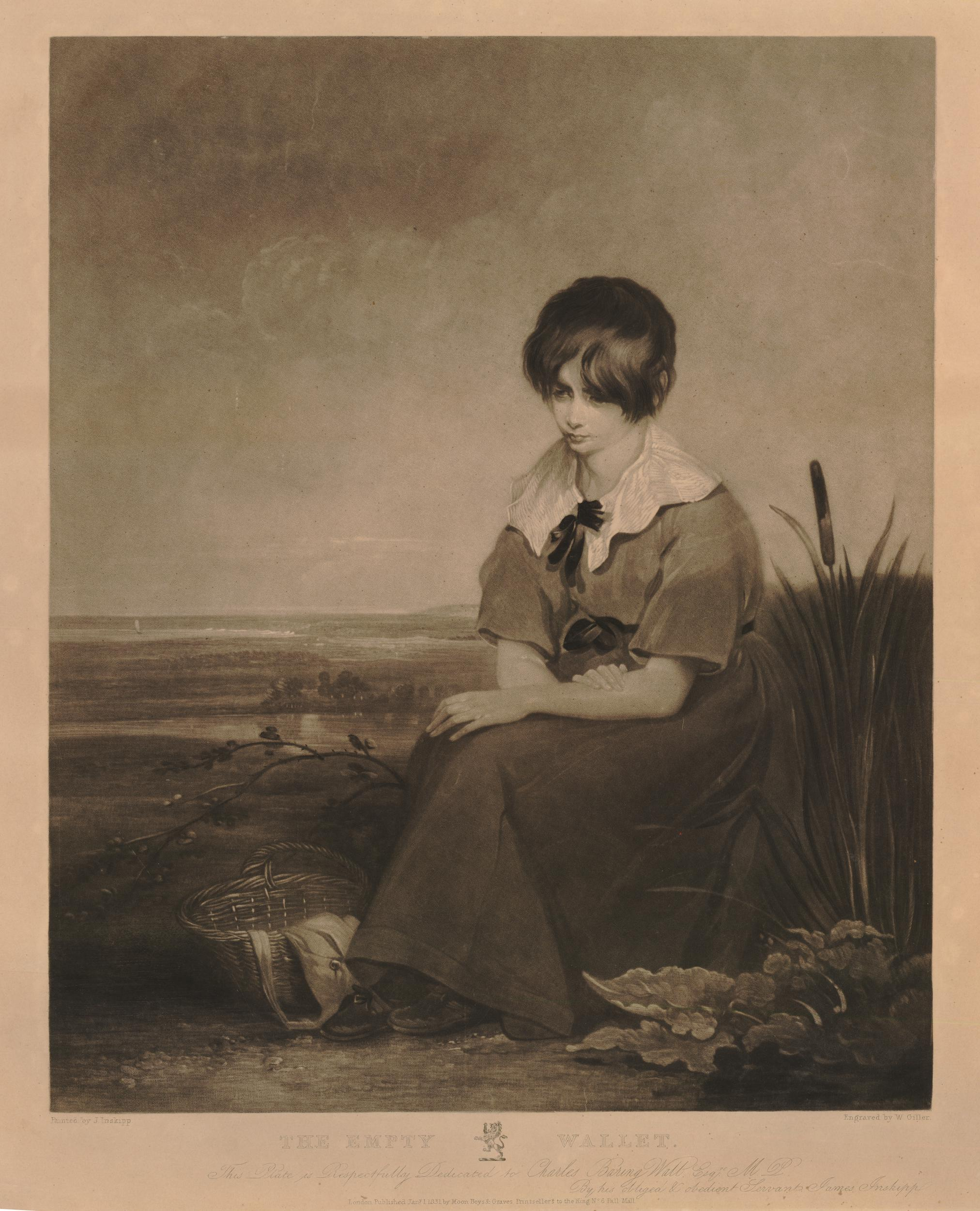
The Empty Wallet, 1831

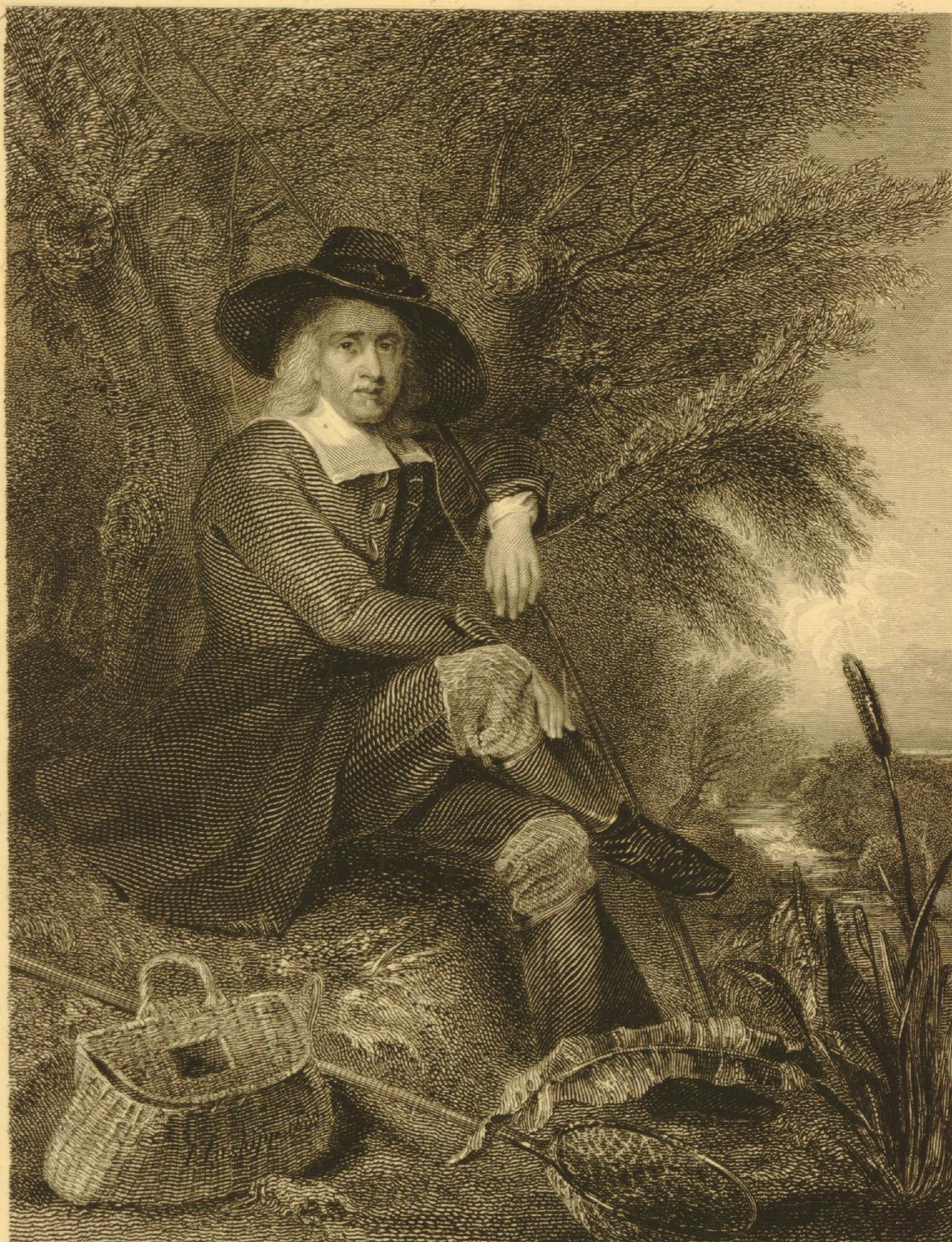
The Compleat Angler,1832 (This is an illustration of Isaac Walton Taber)

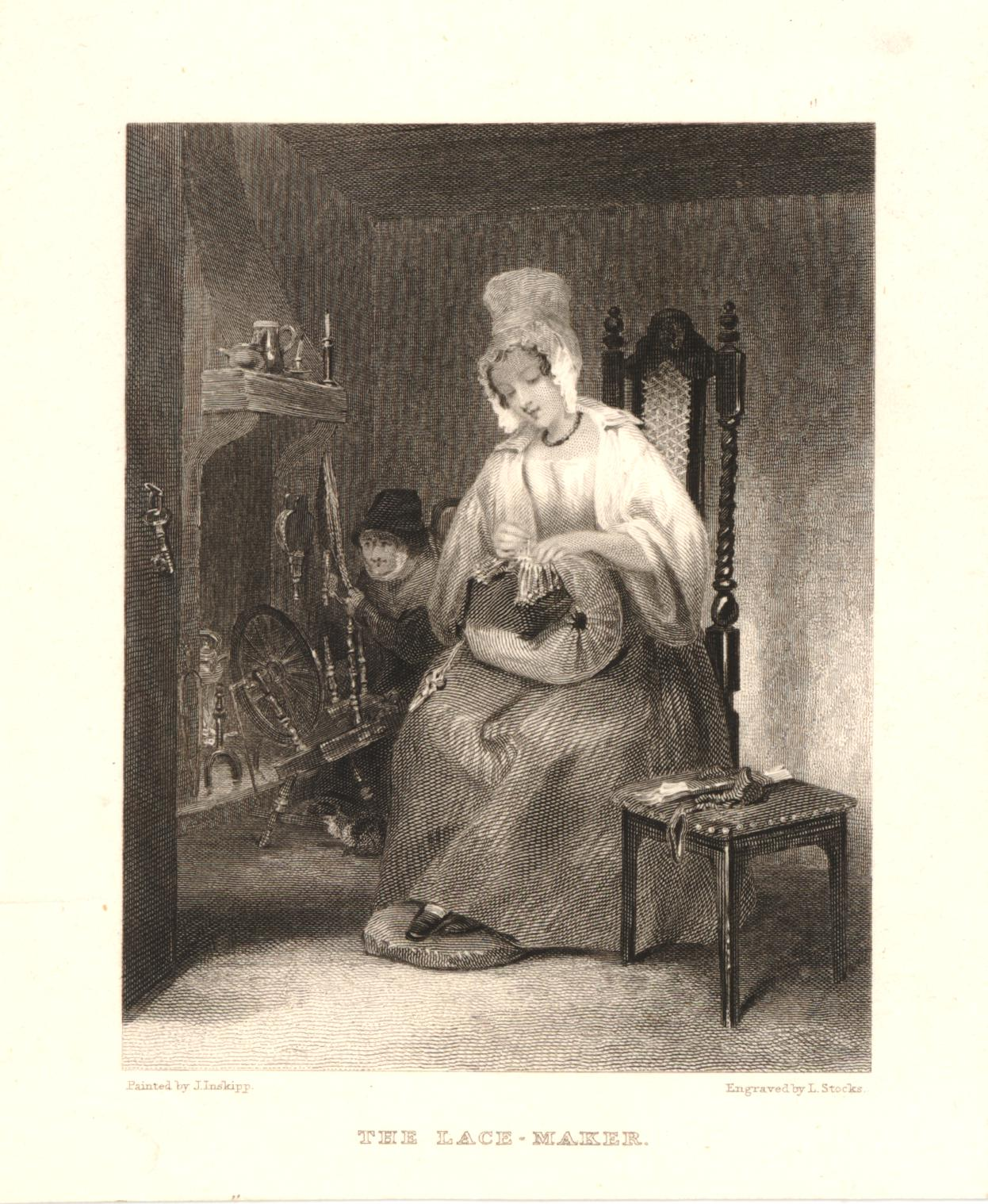
The Lace Maker, 1835

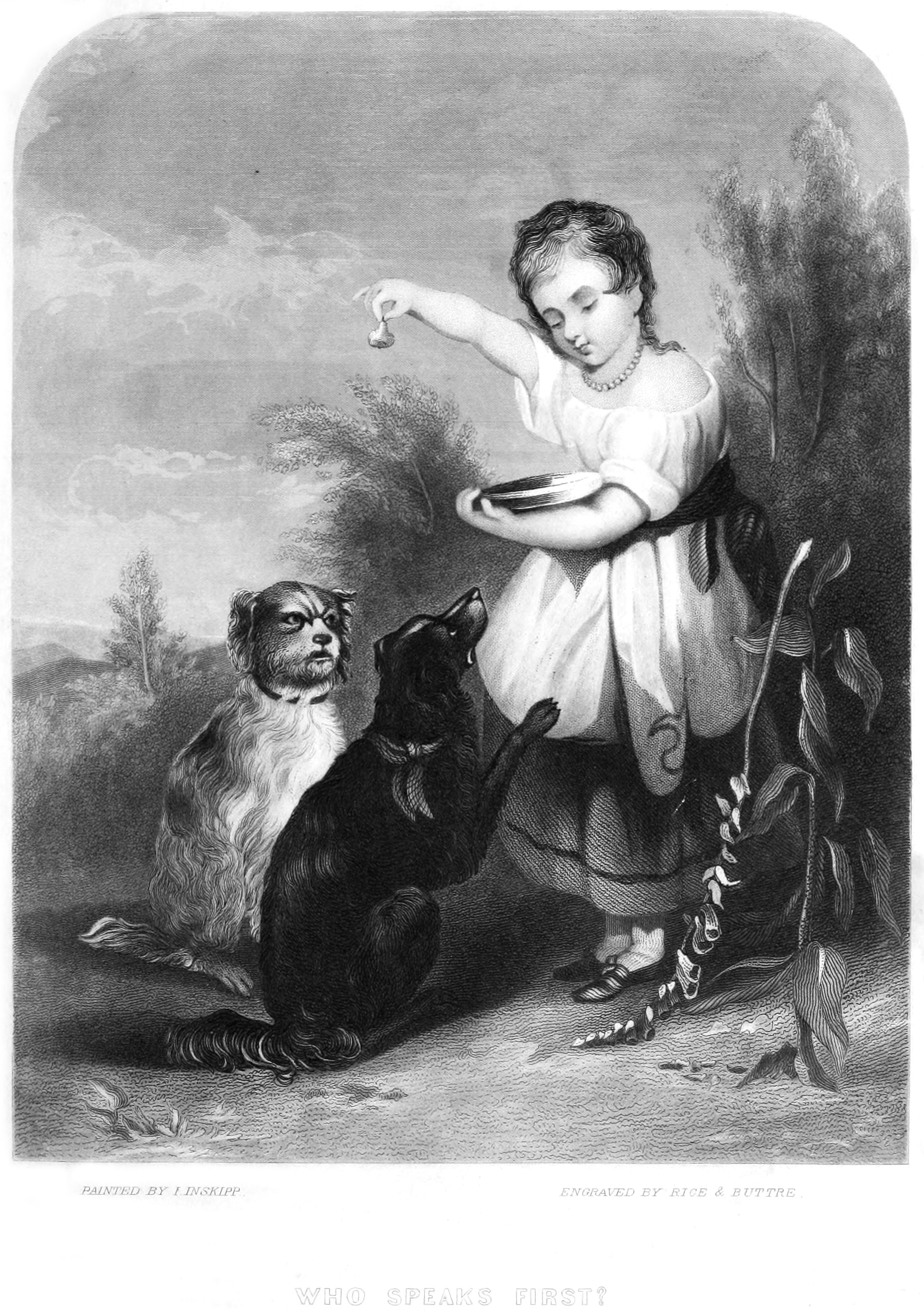
Who Speaks First, 1877
