= Women's Archive Wales =

Welsh archive charity

Coordinates: 51°36′36″N 3°58′41″W

Archif Menywod Cymru / Women's Archive Wales
- Abbreviation: AMC/WAW; WAW
- Nickname: Archif Menywod Cymru (Welsh); Women's Archive Wales
- Formation: 1997; 29 years ago
- Founder: Ursula Masson; Avril Rolph
- Type: Charitable organisation; Archive
- Headquarters: Singleton Park Library, Swansea University, Singleton Park, Swansea
- Website: womensarchivewales.org

Women's Archive Wales (Welsh: Archif Menywod Cymru, official name Archif Menywod Cymru / Women's Archive Wales) (WAW or AMC/WAW) is a charity which works to identify and preserve resources for the study of women in the history of Wales.

Its aims are defined as: "To identify and rescue materials relating to the lives of women in Wales past, present and future, and encourage their deposit in appropriate public repositories" and "To promote understanding of women’s roles in Welsh history, and the inclusion of women in history taught in schools and higher education."

AMC/WAW's collections are held in county archives, the National Library of Wales, Amgueddfa Cymru – Museum Wales, and university and other libraries.

AMC/WAW supports research and study into women's history in Wales, including both Welsh women and other women who have lived or worked in Wales or contributed to Welsh history.

It was co-founded by Ursula Masson, who in 1995 had obtained research funding to document the history of the women's liberation movement in Wales. In December 1997 she and her research assistant Avril Rolph organised a meeting of librarians, archivists, historians and other interested parties, which resulted in the formation of AMC/WAW. Its first AGM was held in 1998 and Deirdre Beddoe was elected as chair.
