= HMS Thames =

Eight ships of the Royal Navy have borne the name HMS Thames, after the River Thames:

- HMS Thames (1758) was a 32-gun fifth rate launched in 1758 and broken up in 1803. She was in French hands between 1793 and 1796, when she was known as Tamise.
- HMS Thames (1805) was another 32-gun fifth rate, launched in 1805 and broken up in 1816.
- HMS Thames (1805 tender) was a cutter tender built in 1805. She became a dockyard craft in 1866 and was renamed YC 2. She was sold in 1872.
- HMS Thames (1823) was a 46-gun fifth rate launched in 1823. She was converted to a prison ship in 1841, and sank at her moorings in 1863.
- HMS Thames (1885) was a Mersey-class second-class cruiser launched in 1885. She was converted to a depot ship in 1903, and was sold in 1920 to become a training ship at the Cape, being renamed General Botha. Her name reverted to Thames when she became an accommodation ship in 1942; she was finally scuttled in 1947.
- HMS Thames (N71) was a River-class submarine launched in 1932 and sunk by a mine in 1940.
- HMS Thames (1938), a tugboat in service during World War II
- HMS Thames has since 1949 been the name borne by a sequence of Royal Naval Volunteer Reserve tenders.

== See also ==
- HCS Thames (1814) was a bomb ketch that the Bombay Dockyard launched for the Bombay Marine, the naval arm of the British East India Company (EIC). At some point after active service she became a luggage ship; her ultimate fate is unknown.
