= Paul Harris Nicolas =

Royal Marines officer, historian and artist

- Born: Paul Harris Nicolas; 1 March 1790; St Martin-by-Looe, Cornwall, England
- Died: 1 May 1860 (aged 70); Notting Hill, London, England
- Military career
- Allegiance: United Kingdom
- Branch: Royal Marines
- Service years: 1805–1814
- Rank: First lieutenant
- Conflicts: Napoleonic Wars; Battle of Trafalgar; Battle of Basque Roads
- Awards: Naval General Service Medal
- Other work: Historian, writer, artist

Paul Harris Nicolas (1 March 1790 – 1 May 1860) was a Royal Marines officer, historian, and artist. Nicolas was the author of the two volume Historical Record of the Royal Marine Forces.

== Family origins and early years ==
Paul Harris Nicolas was born at St Martin-by-Looe, Cornwall, England, on 1 March 1790. He was the nephew of a British Marine Lieutenant, Nicholas Harris Nicholas (1755–1816) who was wounded at the Battle of Bunker Hill. Paul Harris Nicolas was himself the second of five sons of still another noteworthy, if lesser known, British water colourist, Commander John Harris Nicolas, RN (1758–1844), and his wife, the former Margaret Blake (1762–1852). With deep roots in Cornwall, the family also claimed French Huguenot origins. In spite of romantic attachments to the past, however, the commander and his widow continued to spell their name as Nicholas until the end of their lives, long after the decision of their sons (Paul Harris Nicolas and his brothers) to adopt the French-styled "original" spelling of Nicolas.

The four brothers of Paul Harris Nicolas were: Rear Admiral John Toup Nicolas, CB (1788–1851); Commander William Keigwin Nicolas, RN (1792–1871); Lieutenant Sir Nicholas Harris Nicolas, RN (1799–1848); and Charles Henry Nicolas (1801–1881).

== Trafalgar and the Royal Marines ==
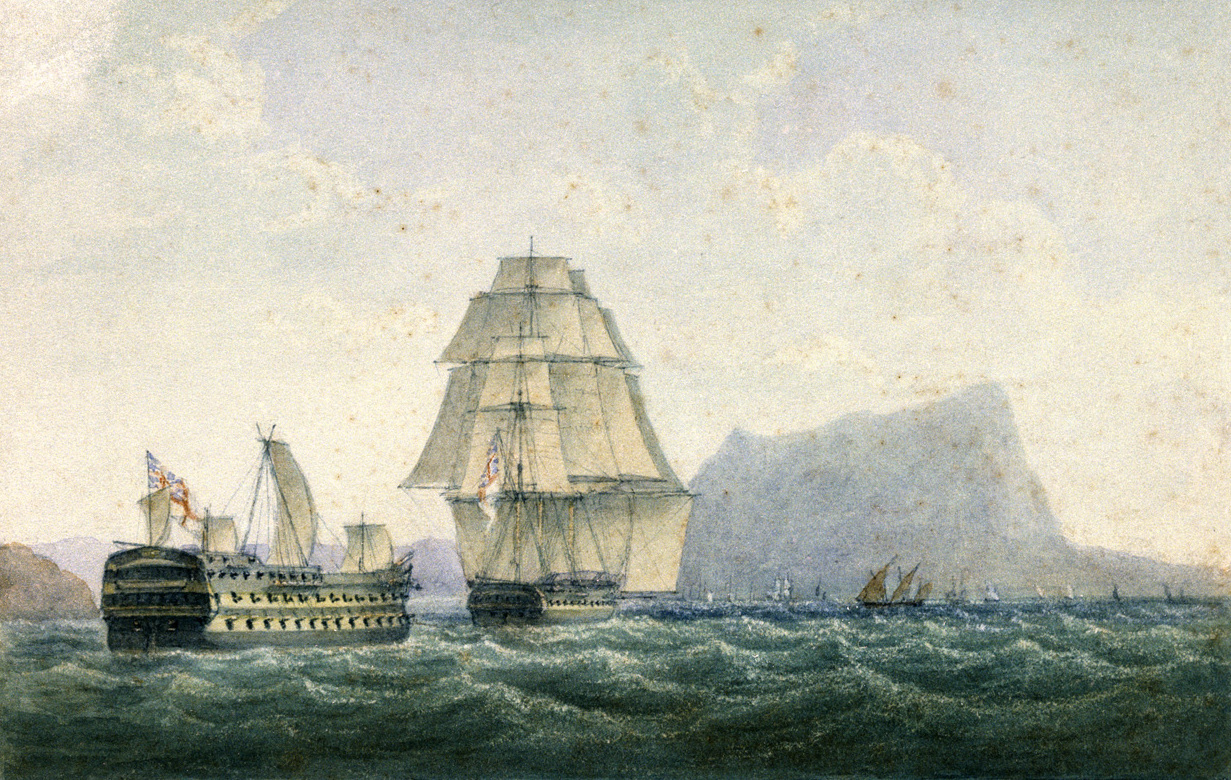
A watercolour by Nicolas of the Belleisle in tow of the Naiad off Gibraltar, on 23 October 1805

Having entered the Royal Navy as a volunteer at an early age, Nicolas was commissioned a second lieutenant in the Royal Marines on 6 July 1805. He was thus not quite sixteen when, aboard the 80-gun Belleisle under the command of Captain William Hargood, he joined Lord Nelson's fleet off Cadiz in the early part of October 1805.

In 1829 he published an account of the naval battle in which his ship, alone, was totally dismasted with a loss of 33 officers and men killed (nine of whom were Royal Marines), and a further 93 officers and men wounded, including both ship's Captain William Hargood and First Lieutenant (later Lieutenant General [Army List] and Deputy Adjutant-General (Colonel, Royal Marines) Sir John Owen KCB KH (1777–1857), an officer who was young Lieutenant Nicolas' immediate superior in charge of the Marines on the poop. Sergeant John Jackson and 12 other Royal Marines also numbered among the ship's casualties.

In all, 92 Royal Marine officers and over 3,600 Marines of other ranks were present at Trafalgar aboard the ships of Nelson's fleet. Four Marine officers were among the killed and 13 more were wounded. Losses in killed and wounded among the total rank and file of the Royal Marines who were present at Trafalgar were proportionately severe.

Nicolas was promoted to first lieutenant in the Royal Marines on 27 July 1808. He fought in the Battle of Basque Roads in 1809.

On 24 June 1813, he married Miss Ann Morcoumbe. On 1 September 1814 Nicolas went on half-pay, which with the passing of years came to amount to his effective retirement from the military.

== Later years, artistic and literary work ==
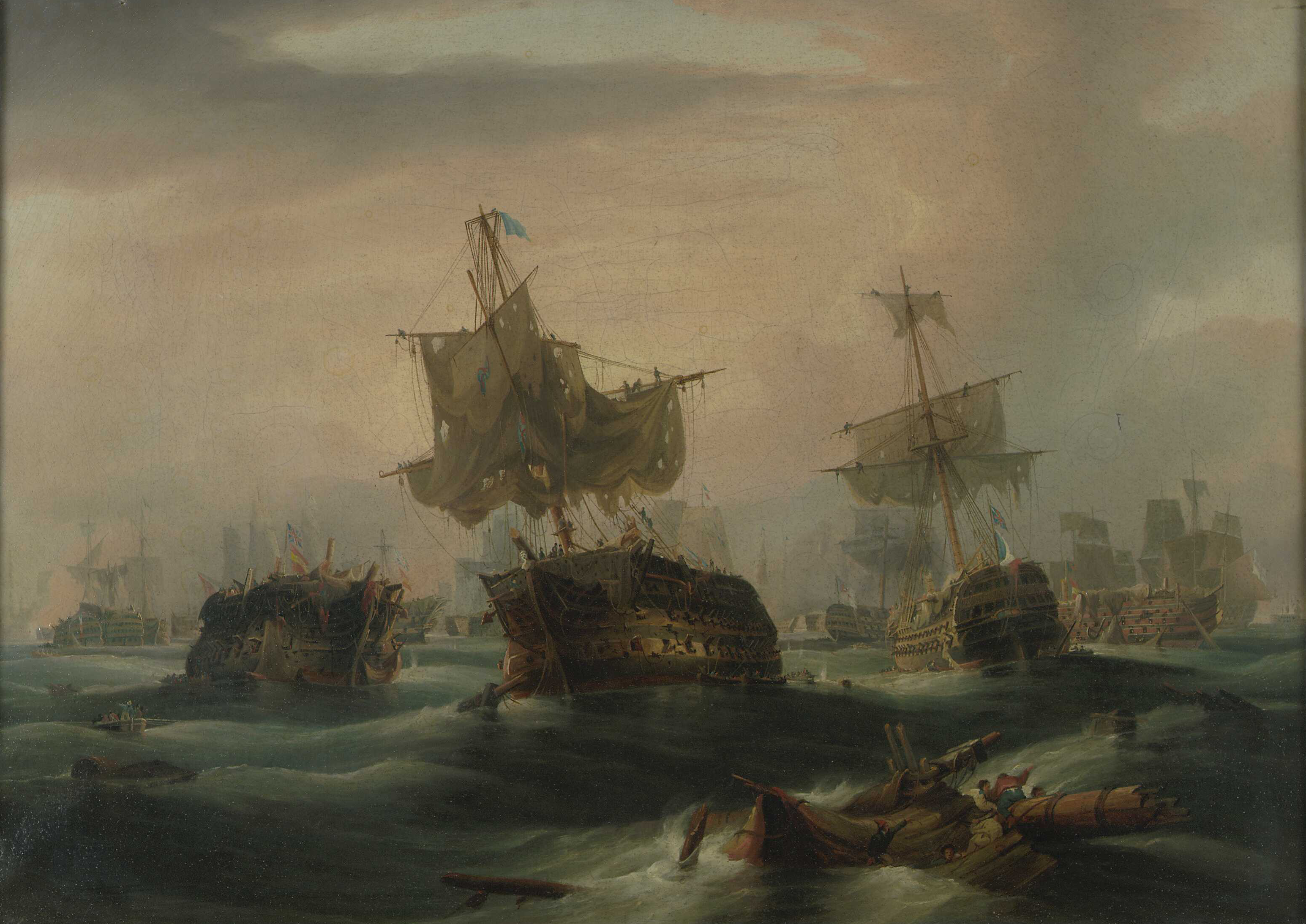
Huggins picture of The Battle of Trafalgar, 21 October 1805, after a watercolour by Nicolas

Nicolas' skillful watercolour rendering of HMS Belleisle at Trafalgar became the model for the central painting in the work of marine painter William John Huggins which was commissioned to commemorate the Battle of Trafalgar by William IV of the United Kingdom. His two volume Historical Record of the Royal Marine Forces is still a starting point for students of the military institution and its changing role in the course of British history.

Nicolas also collaborated with Brevet Major Richard Johns, RM (1805–1851) in completing and publishing his co-author's work posthumously as The Naval and Military Heroes of Great Britain, or Calendar of Victory, being a record of British Valour and Conquest by sea and by land on every day in the year from the Reign of William the Conqueror to the Battle of Inkerman (London:Longman, Brown, Green, and Longmans, 1855); and (London:Bohn 1860).

In 1848 or 1849, Nicolas was awarded the Naval General Service Medal with two clasps (representing Trafalgar and Basque Roads). In declining health, Paul Harris Nicolas died in Notting Hill, London, on 1 May 1860.

== See also ==
- Royal Marines Museum
- History of the Royal Marines
