= HMS Euphrates (1813) =

Royal Navy fifth-rate frigate

- Plan of the Scamander-class frigates

History

United Kingdom
- Name: Euphrates
- Namesake: Euphrates
- Ordered: 12 October 1812
- Builder: John King, Upnor
- Laid down: January 1813
- Launched: 8 November 1813
- Completed: 24 September 1814
- Commissioned: August 1814
- Out of service: 1817
- Fate: Sold 29 January 1818

General characteristics
- Class & type: Fifth-rate Scamander-class frigate
- Tons burthen: 943 (bm)
- Length: 143 ft 3 1/2 in (43.7 m) (upper deck); 120 ft 2 1/4 in (36.6 m) (keel)
- Beam: 38 ft 5 in (11.7 m)
- Draught: 8 ft 5 in (2.6 m) (forward); 12 ft 8 in (3.9 m) (aft)
- Depth of hold: 12 ft 4 in (3.8 m)
- Propulsion: Sails
- Complement: 284
- Armament: UD: 26 × 18-pounder guns; QD: 12 × 32-pounder carronades; Fc: 2 × 9-pounder guns + 2 × 32-pounder carronades

HMS Euphrates was a 36-gun Scamander-class frigate of the Royal Navy. Constructed in response to the start of the War of 1812, Euphrates was commissioned in August 1814 under Captain Robert Foulis Preston. The frigate spent her wartime service in the English Channel and unsuccessfully hunting for American privateers off the Azores. Kept on in the post-Napoleonic Wars peace, the ship was sent to serve in the Mediterranean Fleet.

Euphrates was stationed at Corfu with orders to combat pirates, until Admiral Lord Exmouth arrived in the Mediterranean for operations against Algiers. Taken off her regular duties for this, Euphrates missed the Bombardment of Algiers when Preston chose not to pass on the despatch announcing Exmouth's arrival to his commanding officer, Rear-Admiral Sir Charles Penrose. Early in the following year the frigate was ordered home. Preston, whose mental health had been deteriorating, slit his throat after Euphrates had departed from Gibraltar, and died rabidly insane three days later. The frigate saw no more service after returning to England, and was sold in 1818.

== Design ==
Euphrates was a 36-gun, 18-pounder fifth-rate Scamander-class frigate. The class was constructed as part of the reaction of Lord Melville's Admiralty to the beginning of the War of 1812. This new theatre of operations, with the Napoleonic Wars ongoing, was expected to put a strain on the existing fleet of Royal Navy frigates. Designed by the Surveyor of the Navy, Sir William Rule, the Scamander class was put into construction to fill this need. The class was a variant of the existing Apollo-class frigate, which had been the standard design for 36-gun frigates in the Royal Navy for over a decade. The class was particularly copied from the lines of the 36-gun frigate HMS Euryalus.

The war was expected to only be a short affair, and so ships built specifically for it were not designed for long service lives. As such Euphrates's class was ordered to be constructed out of the soft but easily available "fir". This meant the use of red and yellow pine. Using pine for construction meant that the usually long period of time between keel laying and launching could be dramatically decreased to as little as three months. Pine-built ships could usually be differentiated from those of oak by their flat "square tuck" stern, but as copies of oak-built ships the Scamander class did not have this feature. The naval historian Robert Gardiner describes the class as an "austerity" version of the Apollos.

Pine was a lighter material than oak which allowed the ships to often sail faster than those built of the heavier wood, but this in turn meant that the ships required more ballast than usual to ensure that they sat at their designated waterline. Based on an oak-built design but with more ballast than that design was expected to carry, Euphrates and her class were designed with a distinctly shallower depth in the hold. This ensured that the frigates were not adversely affected by the excess ballast, which could cause them to sail overly rigidly and without much give.

== Construction ==
The first seven ships of the Scamander class, six of which were ordered in May before the war had begun, were built with red pine. Euphrates was one of these. The final three received yellow pine. All ships of the class were ordered to commercial shipyards rather than Royal Navy Dockyards, with the navy providing the pine for their construction from its own stocks. Euphrates was ordered on 12 October 1812, to be built by the shipwright John King at Upnor. She was initially ordered under the name Greyhound, but this was changed on 11 December for her namesake the Euphrates. The frigate was laid down in January the following year, and launched on 8 November 1813 with the following dimensions: 143 feet 3 1/2 inches (43.7 m) along the upper deck, 120 feet 2 1/4 inches (36.6 m) at the keel, with a beam of 38 feet 5 inches (11.7 m) and a depth of hold of 12 feet 4 inches (3.8 m). The ship had a draught of 8 feet 5 inches (2.6 m) forward and 12 feet 8 inches (3.9 m) aft, and measured 943 tons burthen.

The fitting out process for Euphrates was completed at Chatham Dockyard on 24 September 1814. The frigate originally had a crew complement of 274, but this was increased to 284 for the entire class on 26 January 1813, while she was under construction. Euphrates held twenty-six 18-pounder long guns on her upper deck. Complementing this armament were twelve 32-pounder carronades on the quarterdeck, with two 9-pounder long guns and two additional 32-pounder carronades on the forecastle.

== Service ==
Euphrates was commissioned under Captain Robert Foulis Preston in August 1814. Initially at Portsmouth, the ship moved down to St Helens on the Isle of Wight on 20 October. She sailed from Plymouth to patrol the English Channel alongside the 18-gun sloop HMS Pheasant on 27 October. With American privateers frequently attacking British shipping, the two ships were then sent to the Azores to deter them. Arriving on 11 November at São Miguel Island, by 22 November Preston had seen only one privateer, the 12-gun Hero, which as soon as it saw the British ships sailed away from the islands.

Euphrates spent five months stationed in the area, coming across only five ships as she patrolled. She returned to England in February 1815, stopping at Madeira on 17 February before reaching Portsmouth on 10 March. After Napoleon's defeat at the Battle of Waterloo Euphrates was one of a number of ships sent out from Portsmouth on 1 July to prevent any attempt by him to flee to America. They were ordered to detain any suspicious vessel they came across that had sailed from a French port. On 23 July Euphrates was sailing off Cherbourg with the 18-gun brig-sloop HMS Despatch when the Bonapartist military commandant raised the white flag and surrendered the port. Preston took the two ships into the harbour where they anchored as a sign of good faith before dining with the governor, on which a newspaper reported:

"The passing events, however, did not appear to be a favourite topic of conversation."

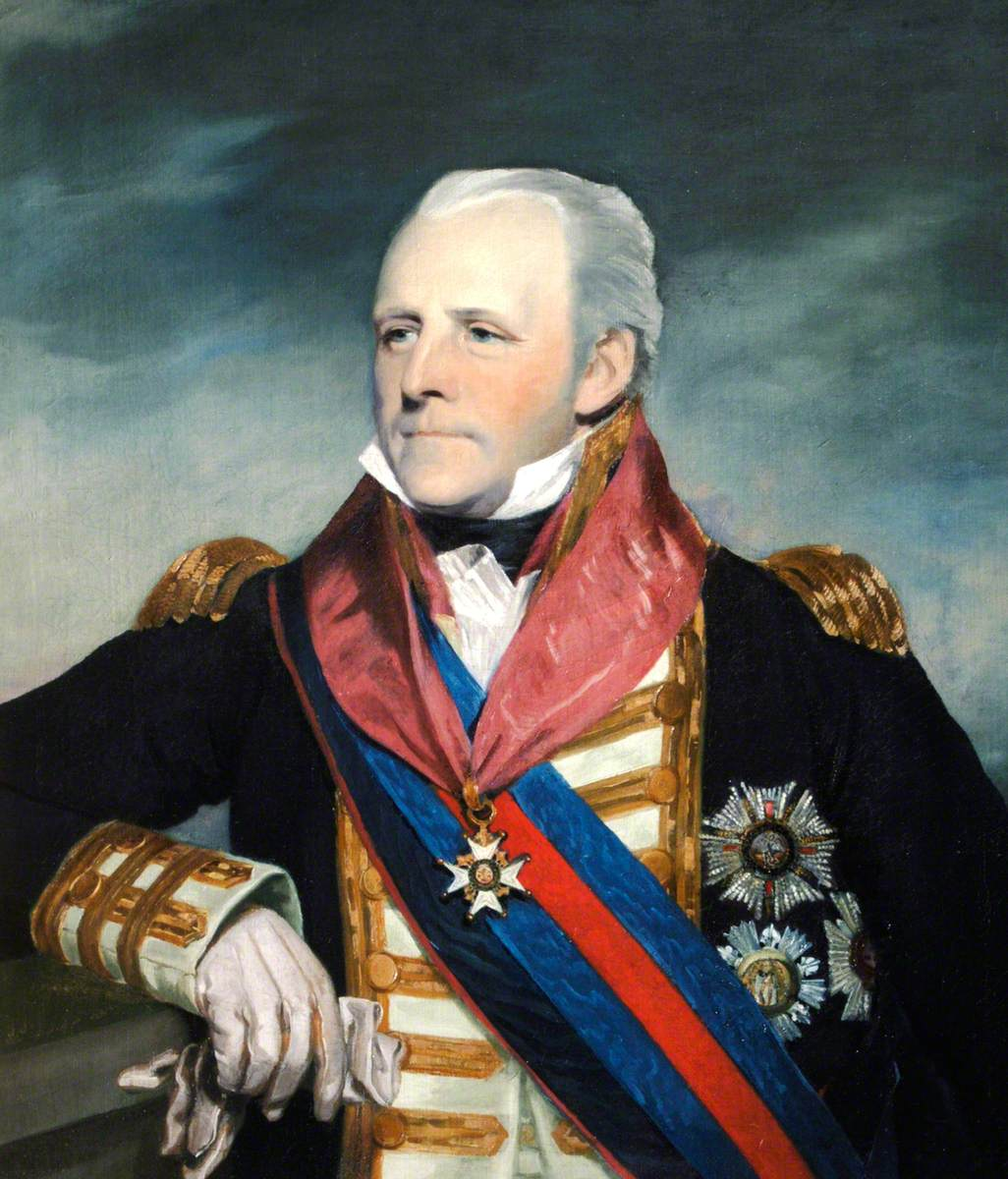
Sir Charles Penrose, under whose orders Euphrates served in the Mediterranean

=== Peacetime ===
With the wars coming to an end, in mid-August Euphrates returned to Portsmouth to sail upriver to be paid off. Soon afterwards this decision was reversed, and the frigate was kept on as part of the Royal Navy's peace establishment with an expectation of three years service. While at Sheerness Dockyard in September she was assigned to join the Mediterranean Fleet. Needing volunteers to fill a peacetime crew, it took Preston seven months to recruit enough men to bring the ship to operational levels. She sailed on 12 April 1816, arriving at Gibraltar on 25 May before sailing on with despatches for the commander of the Mediterranean Fleet, Admiral Lord Exmouth, three days later.

Euphrates came under the orders of the second-in-command of the fleet, Rear-Admiral Sir Charles Penrose, who assigned the ship to pirate hunting duties in July. Throughout this period the ship was based at Corfu under the Lord High Commissioner of the Ionian Islands, Lieutenant-General Sir Thomas Maitland. The crew spent time riding, playing cricket, and conversing with the army regiments stationed there in a mostly relaxed atmosphere.

=== Algiers controversy ===
In August, Exmouth began bringing the fleet together for operations against Algiers; Euphrates was one of the ships taken off her regular duties by Penrose to support what became the Bombardment of Algiers.

Euphrates was at Livorno when Exmouth arrived off Algiers. Preston was the first to receive the news, but ignored it, questioning "what have I to do with fleets and admirals?", and did not inform Penrose. One of Euphrates's officers, Lieutenant Frederick Chamier, believed that this was not an act of cowardice on Preston's part, but instead because he had fallen in love with a woman on Corfu. This resulted in Preston neglecting his command of the ship, only briefly visiting Euphrates every few weeks.

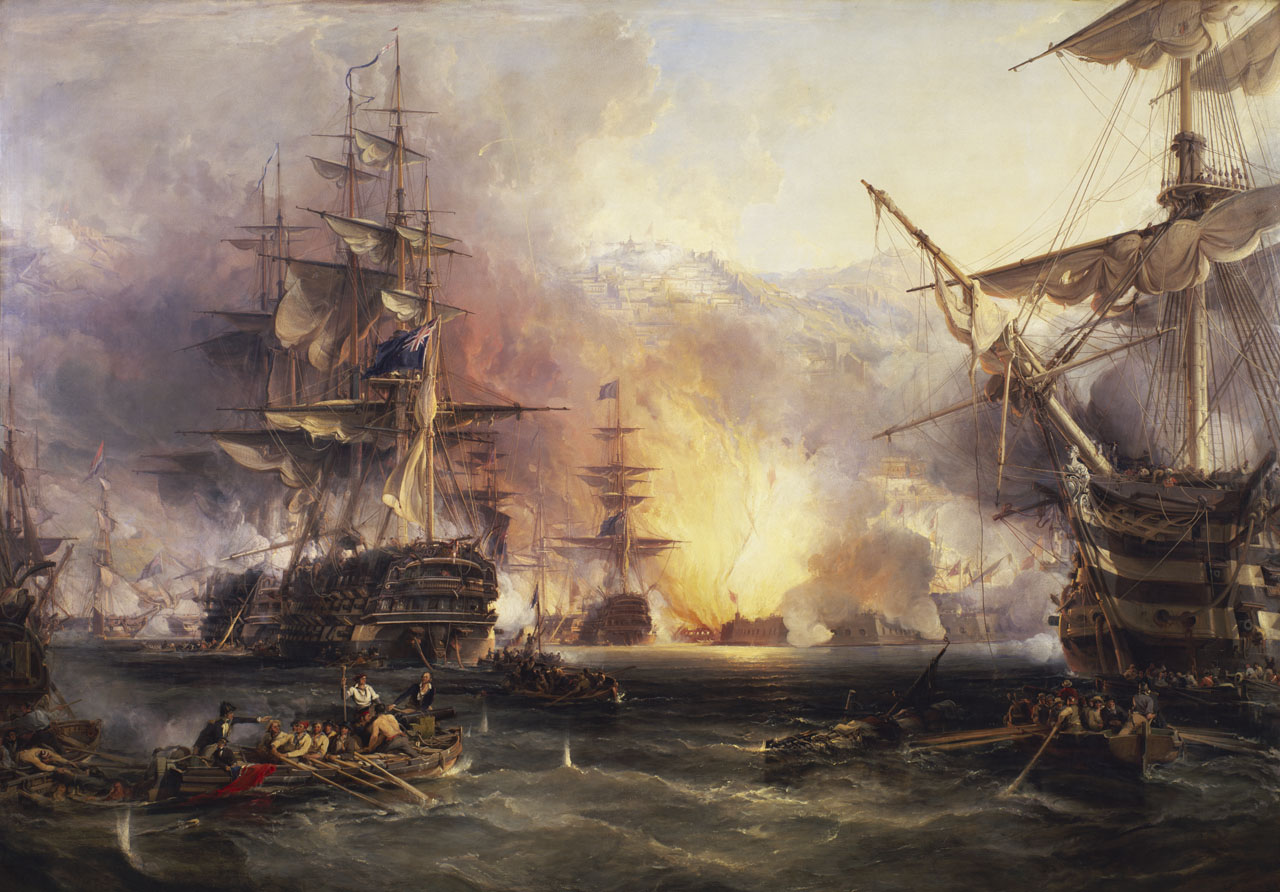
The Bombardment of Algiers, which Euphrates missed after her captain failed to pass on despatches about it

Ten days after receiving the first despatch from Exmouth, Preston received another. This time the captain acceded and set forth in Euphrates; however soon afterwards he ordered the frigate to change course for Marseille, where Preston intended to fulfil previous orders to meet with Maitland. The crew, worried about his state of mind, attempted but failed to change course again. Euphrates was still anchored at Marseille when it received word of Exmouth's successful attack on Algiers, which took place on 27 August. The frigate afterwards returned to service at Corfu.

=== Death of Preston ===
In early 1817 Euphrates was painted by the artist Nicolas Cammillieri as she sailed past Valletta. The ship was ordered to return from the Mediterranean in May, one of several frigates expected to be paid off. As the ship journeyed through the Mediterranean, Preston's mental health deteriorated. He frequently referenced his Corfu lover, believed the crew were hatching conspiracies against him, and that he could see the Devil. On 14 May Euphrates had just left Gibraltar when Preston, dining in his cabin, cut his throat with his breakfast knife. The wound was superficial, and Preston fell asleep, with the frigate's first lieutenant taking over command. The captain awoke in the evening in what Chamier described as "a perfect state of insanity", and was secured in a straitjacket. The captain raved loudly, alternately screaming about being a victim of the Spanish Inquisition and imitating a pig. Preston died while Euphrates was sailing off Cape Finisterre on 16 May, with his body placed in a cask of alcohol for the rest of the journey to England.

After a period of quarantine Euphrates reached Spithead on 27 May, where Preston's body was taken ashore and buried at the Garrison Church. Subsequently, the ship was one of four of her class under consideration to be sent as reinforcements to the South America Station, but she stayed in England and was laid up at Deptford Dockyard. Her service at an end, Euphrates was put up for sale at Deptford on 13 January 1818, and was sold to W. Thomas on 29 January for £2,679.
