= Shipbuilding in Frindsbury =

Frindsbury TQ744697 51°23′58″N 0°30′29″E is a parish on the River Medway, on the opposite bank to Chatham Dockyard in Kent, England. It was a centre of ship building before 1820, building at least six 74 gun third rate ships of the line and many smaller vessels. From 1820, until recent times, the ship yards built over 100 Thames sailing barges. Shipbuilding stopped but in 2006, one yard was still active in ship repair.

== Ships ==
=== Quarry House Yard ===
Edward Greaves and Nicholson set up at the Quarry House yard in c.1745. The full list of ships built is unknown but two of the later ones were:

- 1785 HMS Meleager—32 gun frigate was part of a squadron off the coast of Genoa in 1794 under the command of Captain Horatio Nelson.
- 1786 HMS Bellerophon—74 gun designed by Sir Thomas Slade. Laid down in 1783, she was launched on 6 October 1786 and commissioned on 19 July 1790. Nicknamed the "Billy Ruffian". She destroyed the French flagship L'Orient at the Battle of the Nile. Fought at Trafalgar. On 15 July 1815 she received the surrender of Napoleon Bonaparte. She was renamed Captivity and served as a prison hulk off Sheerness. She was sold to breakers at Plymouth for £4030 and broken up in 1834. The construction of the Bellerophon features in a poem by the American Imagist poet Amy Lowell.

Josiah and Thomas Brindley, leased the Quarry House yard. The first ship was launched from here in 1794. They expanded, built a new yard which became the entrance to the Thames and Medway Canal, then a third shipyard further down river. They built no more ships for the Navy after the Napoleonic War. However they did continue shipbuilding. In 1821 they built the McQueen East India Man and in 1825 the British Steam and Navigation Company contracted them to build a steamship. When the Brindleys were declared bankrupt in 1826 they lost their shipyards and all their other businesses. It had been thought that Josiah and Thomas Brindley were nephews of Lord Nelson but the Nelson family has said there is no relationship.

- 1794 HMS Hazard—16 gun
- 1794 HMS Conquest—12 gun
- 1794 HMS Attack—12 gun
- 1803 HMS Shannon—36 gun – commissioned in September 1803, and wrecked 10 December 1803.
- 1804 HMS Firm—12 gun
- 1804 HMS Flamer—12 gun
- 1805 HMS Pomone—38 gun
- 1806 HMS Shannon—38 gun – Launched 5 May 1806, HMS Shannon, commanded by Captain Philip Broke, received the surrender of the USS Chesapeake in Boston Bay on 1 June 1813, after a fight of 15 minutes.
- 1807 HMS Aboukir—74 gun
- 1808 HMS Badger—10 gun
- 1809 HMS Crane—18 gun
- 1809 HMS Thracian—18 gun
- 1810 HMS Cressy—74 gun
- 1811 HMS Asia—74 gun
- 1811 HMS Chatham transport
- 1813 HMS Orontes—36 gun
- 1813 HMS Scamander—36 gun
- 1813 HMS Slaney—20 gun
- 1814 HMS Lee—20 gun
- 1814 HMS Menai—26 gun
- 1814 HMS Tamar—26 gun

Wilson and Co

- 1794 HMS Peterel—16 gun
- 1796 HMS Cyane—18 gun
- 1797 HMS Hasty—12 gun
- 1797 HMS Hecate—12 gun

John Pelham

- 1807 HMS Leonidas—36 gun
- 1808 HMS Wild Boar—10 gun
- 1808 HMS Bermuda—10 gun
- 1809 HMS Echo—18 gun
- 1809 HMS Sophie—18 gun
- 1812 HMS Conway—20 gun
- 1812 HMS Romney—58 gun

John King of Upnor

- 1801 HMS Reynard—10 gun
- 1801 HMS Ephira—10 gun
- 1801 HMS Helicon—10 gun
- 1801 HMS Cordelia—10 gun
- 1801 HMS Briseis—10 gun
- 1809 HMS Hecate—18 gun
- 1809 HMS Rifleman—18 gun
- 1809 HMS Poictiers—74 gun third rate ship of the line.
- 1810 HMS Pigmy—10 gun
- 1810 HMS Pioneer—12 gun
- 1810 HMS Algerine—Cutter
- 1810 Medway - merchant ship that twice transported convicts to Van Diemen's Land
- 1812 HMS Heron—18 gun
- 1812 HMS Dispatch—18 gun
- 1812 HMS Mulgrave—74 gun
- 1813 HMS Euphrates—36 gun
- 1814 HMS Bann—20 gun

== Barge Building ==
Frindsbury was an important centre for building of Thames sailing barges, using the land vacated by the shipbuilders. Barges were needed for many reasons; on the Medway it was for cement, brick and lime.

Curel's

- In c. 1820 the lease of Quarry Yard, (Curel's Lower Yard), passed to John Curel. George H. Curel took over the business around 1870. He expanded the yard in 1887 leasing the yard by Strood Basin (Curel's Upper Yard).

Other families ran yards in Frindsbury, often they had other yards in Rochester.

Little

- William Burgess Little
- James Little

Gill

- Gill Family, George Gill, of Cheetham Gill and Company. Canal shipyard.

London and Rochester Barge Co

- LRTC- Crescent Shipping- Canal Road, this yard was still operating in 2006, being used for ship repair.

=== List of Barges ===
Here are some Frindsbury-built barges grouped by their owners. From 1870 to 1990 the Register of Shipping shows just over 100 Frindsbury Built Barges.

Phoenix Portland Cement Company, Frindsbury.

- Hawk—43 ton
- Cerf—58 ton
- Phoenix—51 ton

William Tingey

- Robert Bladen—33 ton
- Eliza—41 ton

Formby Cement Company, Whitewall Creek, Frindsbury

- Sara—39 ton
- Pink—43 ton
- Queen—43 ton
- Neptune—40 ton
- Whitewall—37 ton
- Vauxhall—40 ton
- Eclipse—39 ton
- Margaret Louise—45 ton
- Ella Vicars—43 ton

Burham Brick, Lime and Cement Company

- James—42 ton
- John—40 ton
- Ann—40 ton
- Varnes—41 ton
- The Gun—44 ton
- William—41 ton

Peter Bros Ltd. Cement Works Burham

- John—38 ton
- William—39 ton
- Overcomer—44 ton
- Monkwood—46 ton
- Ninety Nine—57 ton

Trenchmann Weekes Company Halling

- John Tinworth—43 ton
- William and Sarah—41 ton
- George—45 ton
- Ambrose—40 ton
- Bella—35 ton
- Edward and William—40 ton
- Stratford—42 ton

West Kent Portland Cement Company (Margretts)

- Stanley Margretts—44 ton
- Cecil Margretts—46 ton
- Harold Margretts—45 ton

Imperial Portland Cement Company

- Gundulph—44 ton

John Blazey White, Gillingham

- Sarah—38 ton
- Flower of Kent—44 ton

Queenborough Cement Company

- Trent—42 ton

Solomon Brice and Sons, Rainham and Hoo

- Ada Mary—41 ton
- Alumina—60 ton
- Mosquito—40 ton
- William Bennet—42 ton

Eastwoods (Medway brickmakers)

- 1845 George and Eliza
- 1852 Frederick and Mary Ann
- 1857 Ann and Frances
- 1862 Arthur and Eliza
- 1872 Onward
- 1876 Atlanta
- 1879 Hawk
- 1881 Banff
- 1884 Plover
- 1886 Snipe
