= Lord Suffield (1816 ship) =

Ship used by the British East Indian Company

History

United Kingdom
- Name: Lord Suffield
- Builder: Jacob Preston, Great Yarmouth
- Launched: 5 June 1816
- Fate: Wrecked 17 April 1832

General characteristics
- Tons burthen: 367, or 36893/94 (bm)

Lord Suffield was launched in 1816, at Great Yarmouth. She made a voyage to Peru that proved unsuccessful after the insurgent forces detained and then released her, under pressure from the Royal Navy. Next, she made several voyages to Bengal under a licence from the British East India Company (EIC). Finally, she grounded on 17 April 1832, in Pentland Firth and was wrecked.

== Career ==
Lord Suffield first appeared in Lloyd's Register (LR) in 1816, with T.Seward, master, J.Preston, owner, and trade Yarmouth–Baltic.

In 1813, the EIC had lost its monopoly on the trade between India and Britain. British ships were then free to sail to India or the Indian Ocean under a license from the EIC.

Year	Master	Owner	Trade	Source
1818	B.Brown	J.Preston	London–Calcutta	LR
1820	B.Brown	Brown & CO.	Plymouth–India	LR

Lloyd's List (LL) reported on 29 March 1821, that Edward Ellice, Heath, master, Lord Suffield, Brown, master, and Grant, Hogarth, master, had sailed from Cadiz in June 1820. The cargoes were primarily quicksilver. The reason they stopped at Cadiz was to get secret, alternate papers, that showed them as carrying Spanish cargo under licenses issued originally in by the Spanish authorities in Chile. These would enable them to trade with the Spanish territories such as Peru. Their open, British papers, would protect them from the insurgent forces in Chile.

They were then caught up in the conflict between Spain and the local independence movement in South America. The Chilean squadron had detained Edward Ellice and Lord Suffield at Callao; the Spanish authorities had seized Grant. The report listed a number of other vessels, British and American, such as Indian, that had also been detained by one side or the other. Edward Ellice, Lord Suffield, and Indian, which Lord Cochrane's squadron had detained, arrived at Valparaiso for adjudication on 1 March 1821. Cochrane had captured the secret documents for Edward Ellice and Lord Suffield, and wanted to condemn them as Spanish property.

A later report was that the Prize Court at Valparaiso had condemned Indian and her cargo. Edward Ellice and Lord Suffield had not yet been adjudicated. However, Commodore Thomas Hardy, Commander-in-Chief on the South America Station, was present in HMS Superb and stated that he would not allow any of the property to be touched. An advice dated 8 August, at Santiago de Chili reported that Edward Ellice and Lord Suffield had been restored, with their cargoes. On 14 September she sailed for the coast of Peru.

On 11 March 1822, Lord Suffield arrived at Gibraltar after a voyage of 112 days from Callao. She still carried the cargo she had taken out to Peru and which it had been impractical to land. Commodore Hardy and Superbe were about to leave and so unable to provide protection.

On her return from Peru, Lord Suffield sailed to India on 7 September 1822, under a EIC license. Lord Suffield returned from Bengal on 11 April 1824. In between, she may have gone to the Baltic, or not. sources are contradictory. LR reported that on 1 February 1824, Lord Suffield, D.Dipnal, master sailed for Bengal. (This contradicts the SAD data above.)

Year	Master	Owner	Trade	Source
1824	Brown; Clark	Brown&Co. W.Downton	London–Bengal; London–Baltic	LR
1825	R.Brown; Depnell	T.&R.Brown; Indecipherable	London–Baltic; London–Bengal	Register of Shipping
1825	Clark	W.Dowson	London–Baltic	LR

Then on 6 January 1825, Lord Suffield, Depnell, master, bound for Madras and Bengal, put into Portsmouth. She had suffered damages from being run foul of by a vessel in the Downs. Captain Daniel Dipnall died on 21 August 1825. Lord Suffield, Deane, master, arrived at the Cape of Good Hope on 31 December 1825, from Bengal.

Lord Suffield does not appear to have sailed to India again. Instead, it traded generally.

Year	Master	Owner	Trade	Source
1832	Carlill	Carlill	Hull–Quebec	Register of Shipping

== Fate ==
On 17 April 1832, Lord Suffield was driven ashore and wrecked in the Pentland Firth. She was on a voyage from Hull to Quebec City. She had been carrying emigrants for Quebec. The emigrants went to Thurso to remain there awaiting an opportunity to resume their voyage to Quebec.
