= Grant (1798 ship) =

Great Britain
- Name: Grant
- Owner: 1799:Ruckers & Co.; 1800:G.Faith & Co.; 1802:Faith & Co.
- Builder: Whitby
- Launched: 1798, or 1799
- Fate: Not heard from after 1820

General characteristics
- Tons burthen: 386,. or 394, or 396, or 497 (bm)
- Armament: 4 × 6-pounder guns, or 6 × 6-pounder guns

Grant was launched at Whitby in 1798, or possibly 1799. She made one voyage for the British East India Company (EIC) between 1800 and 1802 bringing rice to England from Bengal. Thereafter she sailed as a West Indiaman or a London-based transport. She was last heard from in 1820; Spanish authorities may have seized her off Peru.

== Career ==
Grant first appears in Lloyd's Register in 1800 with Peacock, master, Rucker & Co. owner, and trade London–St Vincent. The Register of Shipping for 1800 has Peacock as master, but G. Faith owner, and trade Whitby–Shields, changing to London–St Vincent.

Messrs. Princip and Saunders tendered her to the EIC to bring back rice from Bengal. She was one of 28 vessels that sailed between November 1800 and February 1801. On 28 November, Grant, Captain Peacock, sailed from England, bound for Bengal. She was off the English coast on 16 December. She arrived at Calcutta on 30 April 1801.

Homeward bound, she left Bengal on 25 July and by 18 January 1802, was off Dungeness. She returned to her moorings on 24 January.

The voyage to India appears in Lloyd's Register for 1801, but not in the Register of Shipping for 1801. One source states that Grant was used extensively as a convict transport. If so, it is not clear where she transported the convicts from or too as she does not appear in the listings of vessels that transported convicts to Australia.

In May 1816 Grant, Moffat, master, was reported to have been at 15°30′N 27°30′W, 54 days into a voyage from London to Batavia. On 18 February 1817, Lloyd's List reported that HMS Orontes, just arrived at Portsmouth, had spoken with Grant at 1°32′N 17°15′W, out 110 days on her voyage from Madras to England.

Year	Master	Owner	Trade	Source
1802	J.Peacock	G. Faith	London–St Vincent; London–Jamaica	Register of Shipping (RS)
1802	Peacock	Ruckers; Faith & Co.	London–India; London–Jamaica	Lloyd's Register (LR)
1805	W. Wright	G. Faith	London transport	RS
1805	Wright; Syme	Faith & Co.	Cork	LR
1810	J. Smith	G. Faith or Faith & Co.	London–Suriname	RS & LR
1815	Moffat	G. Faith or Faith & Co.	London transport	RS & LR
1821	Hogarth	G. Faith	London–Cadiz	RS
1821	Moffat; Hogarth	Faith & Co.	London	LR

== Fate ==
Grant's fate is obscure as there are reports that are inconsistent.

One report, in Lloyd's List for March 1821, held that Grant had sailed from Cadiz in June 1820 in company with Edward Ellice and Lord Suffield, and that Spanish authorities had seized her off the coast of Peru. On 14 August 1821 Lloyd's list reported that Grant had departed from Gibraltar for San Blas on 30 July 1820, and that there was no further trace of her. The report mentioned that there had been no confirmation of the prior report. Lastly, a letter from Lima dated 17 April 1821, reported that Grant, of London, had been off Pisco, Peru, five months earlier, i.e., in November 1820.

Grant was last listed in the Register of Shipping in 1821. She was last listed in Lloyd's Register in 1825, but with information unchanged since 1821.
