= List of ship launches in 1811 =

The list of ship launches in 1811 includes a chronological list of some ships launched in 1811.

Date	Ship	Class	Builder	Location	Country	Notes
1 January	Numa	Merchantman	John White, Thomas Young & Edward Potts	Sunderland	United Kingdom	For private owner.
9 January	Countess of Harcourt	Merchantman	Chiene	Prince of Wales's Island	Kedah	For George Young.
24 January	Cumbrian	Transport ship	Quintin Blackburn	South Shields	United Kingdom	For Mr. Blackburn.
26 January	Edinburgh	Vengeur-class ship of the line	Brent	Rotherhithe	United Kingdom	For Royal Navy.
25 January	Harleston	Merchantman	Jabez Bayley	Ipswich	United Kingdom	For Peter Everitt Mestaer.
2 March	Atalanta	Merchantman	William Smith & Co.	Newcastle upon Tyne	United Kingdom	For J. Levitt.
16 March	Bacchante	Fifth rate	Robert John Nelson	Deptford	United Kingdom	For Royal Navy.
22 March	Abeona	Merchantman		Newcastle upon Tyne	United Kingdom	For private owner.
22 March	Mary	West Indiaman	Richard Chapma	Bideford	United Kingdom	For William Fry.
26 March	Havannah	Apollo-class frigate	Wilson & Co.	Liverpool	United Kingdom	For Royal Navy.
30 March	Lord Bacarres	East Indiaman		Madras	India	For British East India Company.
March	New Orleans	Sternwheeler	Nicholas Roosevelt	Pittsburgh, Pennsylvania	United States	For Robert Fulton and Robert R. Livingston.
3 April	The Prince Regent	Schooner	William Little	Anderton	United Kingdom	For private owner.
7 April	Ariane	Pallas-class frigate		Nantes	France	For French Navy.
9 April	Lady Holland	West Indiaman	John King	Upnor	United Kingdom	For Mr. Plummer.
10 April	Barrosa	Brig	Strachan & Gavin	Leith	United Kingdom	For private owner.
10 April	General Graham	Merchantman	William Gibson & Co.	Hull	United Kingdom	For J. W. Buckle & Co.
23 April	Earl of Surry	West Indiaman		Ipswich	United Kingdom	For private owner.
23 April	Investigator	Survey ship		Deptford Dockyard	United Kingdom	For Royal Navy.
25 April	Auguste	Bucentaure-class ship of the line	Pierre Jacques Guillaume Laire	Antwerp	France	For French Navy.
25 April	Britannia	Brig	Dryden	Woodbridge	United Kingdom	For private owner.
25 April	Prince Regent	Merchantman	John Pelham	Frindsbury	United Kingdom	For Mr. Middleton.
April	Le Prince d'Esseling	Privateer		Toulon	France	For private owner.
1 May	Lord Nelson	Schooner		Niagara-on-the-Lake	(United Kingdom of Great Britain and Ireland) Upper Canada	For James Crooks.
5 May	Médée	Ariane-class frigate	Mathurin François Boucher	Genoa	France	For French Navy.
8 May	Mary	Merchantman	Jabez Bayley	Ipswich	United Kingdom	For M. Boyd.
9 May	Nord Adler	Selafail-class ship of the line	A. M. Kurochin	Arkhangelsk	Russia	For Imperial Russian Navy.
9 May	Prints Gustav	Selafail-class ship of the line	A. M. Kurochin	Arkhangelsk	Russia	For Imperial Russian Navy.
10 May	Unnamed	Dredger	Gill	Aberdeen	United Kingdom	For Aberdeen Harbour Trustees.
10 May	Andromaque	Pallas-class frigate	Mathurin Crucy	Nantes	France	For French Navy.
17 May	Le Malouin	Privateer		Saint-Malo	France	For Thomazeau Jeune et Compagnie.
22 May	Pacificateur	Bucentaure-class ship of the line	Pierre Jacques Guillaume Lair	Antwerp	France	For French Navy.
24 May	Chesma	Parmiat Estaveti-class ship of the line	I. V. Kurenapov	Saint Petersburg	Russia	For Imperial Russian Navy.
24 May	Sviatyk Zhen Mironosits	Trekh Sviatitelei-class ship of the line	G. S. Isakhov	Saint Petersburg	Russia	For Imperial Russian Navy.
31 May	Dvenadtstadt Apostolov	Poltava-class ship of the line	M. K. Surovtsov	Kherson	Russia	For Imperial Russian Navy.
May	Balgowan	Merchantman	John Anderson	Newburgh	United Kingdom	For private owner.
May	Yssel	Pallas-class frigate		Amsterdam	(France) French First Empire	For French Navy.
3 June	Afrika	Voin-class frigate	M. K. Surovtsov	Kherson	Russia	For Imperial Russian Navy.
9 June	Mont Saint-Bernard	Téméraire-class ship of the line	Jean Marguerite Tupinier	Venice	France	For French Navy.
9 June	Trident	Téméraire-class ship of the line		Toulon	France	For French Navy.
13 June	British Army	Merchantman	Francois Robitaille	Quebec	(United Kingdom of Great Britain and Ireland) Upper Canada	For private owner.
16 June	Carolina	Pallas-class frigate	Jean-François Lafosse	Naples	Kingdom of Naples	For French Navy.
20 June	Orlando	Perseverance-class frigate	Sir Robert Seppings	Chatham Dockyard	United Kingdom	For Royal Navy.
25 June	Nautilus	Brig	Bailey	Ipswich	United Kingdom	For private owner.
June	Illustre	Bucentaure-class ship of the line		Antwerp	France	For French Navy.
6 July	Lesnoe	Anapa-class ship of the line	D. V. Kuznetsov	Nicholaieff	Russia	For Imperial Russian Navy.
7 July	Rigenaratore or Régénérateur	Téméraire-class ship of the line	Fonda	Venice	France	For Royal Italian Navy/French Navy.
8 July	Barham	Vengeur-class ship of the line	Perry, Wells & Green	Blackwall Yard	United Kingdom	For Royal Navy.
8 July	Kingston	Merchantman	Sydenham Teast	Bristol	United Kingdom	For Richard Gibbs & Son.
10 July	Fame	Sloop	Mr. Raymond	Ipswich	United Kingdom	For private owner.
12 July	Fenix	Fenix-class sloop	A. V. Zenkov	Kronstadt	Russia	For Imperial Russian Navy.
13 July	Strela	Lugger	B. F. Stoke	Saint Petersburg	Russia	For Imperial Russian Navy.
22 July	Hermes	Hermes-class post ship	William Stone	Milford Haven	United Kingdom	For Royal Navy.
25 July	Medina	Merchantman	Robert Davy	Topsham	United Kingdom	For Davy & Co.
15 August	Trajan	Téméraire-class ship of the line		Antwerp	France	For French Navy.
4 September	Hannah	Merchantman		Bombay Dockyard	India	For Bruce, Fawcett & Co.
5 September	Princesse de Bologne	Pallas-class frigate		Venice	France	For French Navy.
11 September	True Briton	Merchantman		Quebec	(United Kingdom of Great Britain and Ireland) Lower Canada	For private owners.
16 September	Insolent	Gun-brig		Plymouth Dockyard	United Kingdom	For Royal Navy.
16 September	Union	Boyne-class ship of the line	Joseph Tucker	Plymouth Dockyard	United Kingdom	For Royal Navy.
17 September	Avtroil	Amfitrada-class frigate		Saint Petersburg	Russia	For Imperial Russian Navy.
17 September	Arkhipelag	Amfitrada-class frigate	I. V. Kurepanov	Saint Petersburg	Russia	For Imperial Russian Navy.
19 September	Fife Packet	Smack	Smith	Kirkcaldy	United Kingdom	For Edinburgh, Leith & Hull Shipping Company.
28 September	Adamant	Merchantman		Blyth	United Kingdom	For William Clark.
3 October	Alcmène	Armide-class frigate	Jean Michel Segondat	Cherbourg	France	For French Navy.
3 October	Cabalva	East Indiaman	Wells, Wigram & Green	Blackwall	United Kingdom	For British East India Company.
3 October	La Hogue	Vengeur-class ship of the line	Robert John Nelson	Deptford Dockyard	United Kingdom	For Royal Navy.
3 October	Morley	West Indiaman	John Dudman	Deptford	United Kingdom	For Mr. Morley.
3 October	Sir Simon Clerk	West Indiaman	Syme	Leith	United Kingdom	For private owner.
5 October	Unnamed	Full-rigged ship	John Foster	Selby	United Kingdom	For Thomas Winter.
8 October	Governor Macquarrie	Merchantman		Sydney	(United Kingdom of Great Britain and Ireland) New South Wales	For private owner.
9 October	Fife	West Indiaman	Gilderdale, Pearson & Co	Thorne	United Kingdom	For private owner.
17 October	Marquis of Huntly	East Indiaman	Daniel & Samuel Brent	Rotherhithe	United Kingdom	For private owner.
18 October	Maidstone	Sixth rate	Robert John Nelson	Deptford	United Kingdom	For Royal Navy.
21 October	Castle Lachlan	Full-rigged ship	Scott & Sons	Greenock	United Kingdom	For John Campbell Sr., & Co.
21 October	Christopher	Merchantman		Portneuf, Quebec	(United Kingdom of Great Britain and Ireland) Upper Canada	For private owner.
26 October	Najaden	Frigate	Frantz Hohlenberg	Nyholm	Denmark-Norway	For Dano-Norwegian Navy.
29 October	Minerva	Fourth rate	D. V. Kuznetzov	Nicholaieff	Russia	For Imperial Russian Navy.
31 October	Claudine	Merchantman	Anthony Blackmore	Calcutta	United Kingdom	For Joseph Heathorn.
October	Glasgow Packet	Merchantman	Messrs. Hall, Russell & Co.	Aberdeen	United Kingdom	For private owner.
October	Unnamed	Galiot		Liverpool	United Kingdom	For private owner.
1 November	Swan	Nimble-class cutter	Thomas Gely	Cowes	United Kingdom	For Royal Navy.
3 November	Gloire	Pallas-class frigate	François-Toussaint Gréhan	Havre de Grâce	France	For French Navy.
4 November	Maitland	Merchantman	J. & R. Kyd	Kidderpore	India	For private owner.
13 November	Illyrienne	Pallas-class frigate	François Timothée Benjamin Pestel	Saint-Servan	France	For French Navy.
13 November	Sir James Henry Craig	Merchantman	John Hare	Quebec	(United Kingdom of Great Britain and Ireland) Lower Canada	For private owner.
16 November	Asia	East Indiaman	William Barnard	Deptford	United Kingdom	For British East India Company.
16 November	Bacchante	Fifth rate		Deptford	United Kingdom	For Royal Navy.
16 November	Barkworth	West Indiaman	Barkworth & Hawkes	Hull	United Kingdom	For S. Barkworth.
28 November	Inconstant	Sylphe-class brig	Jean-Baptiste Merestier	Livorno	France	For French Navy.
29 November	Prince Regent	East Indiaman	Wells, Wigram & Green	Blackwall	United Kingdom	For British East India Company.
30 November	Diadème	Bucentaure-class ship of the line	François Louis Anne Etesse	Lorient	France	For French Navy.
30 November	Prince Regent	Merchantman	William Temple	Jarrow	United Kingdom	For Temple.
November	Abercromby	Merchantman		Calcutta	India	For private owner.
1 December	Impérial	Océan-class ship of the line	François Poncet	Toulon	France	For French Navy.
2 December	Asia	Vengeur-class ship of the line	Josiah Brindley	Frindsbury	United Kingdom	For Royal Navy.
2 December	Duncan	Vengeur-class ship of the line	Dudman	Deptford Wharf	United Kingdom	For Royal Navy.
7 December	Arrow	Schooner	Thomas Kemp	Baltimore, Maryland	United States	For private owner.
15 December	Circé	Armide-class frigate	Pierre-Elisabeth Rolland	Rochefort	France	For French Navy.
17 December	Java	Merchantman	Blackmore & Co.	Calcutta	India	For private owner.
17 December	Meuse	Pallas-class frigate		Amsterdam	(France) French First Empire	For French Navy.
17 December	Nimble	Nimble-class cutter	Thomas Gely	Cowes	United Kingdom	For Royal Navy.
18 December	Bengal	East Indiaman	John Wells	Blackwall	United Kingdom	For British East India Company.
21 December	Maria	Brigantine	Foster	Selby	United Kingdom	For private owner.
28 December	Regalia	Merchantman		Monkwearmouth	United Kingdom	For private owner.
30 December	Barrosa	Merchantman	White	Cossipore	India	For private owner.
31 December	Stirling Castle	Vengeur-class ship of the line	Mary Ross	Rochester	United Kingdom	For Royal Navy.
December	Morgiana	Bermuda-class sloop	Robert Hill	Bermuda	(United Kingdom of Great Britain and Ireland) Bermuda	For Royal Navy.
Unknown date	Aberdeen	Merchantman	J. Henry & P. Leitch	Quebec	(United Kingdom of Great Britain and Ireland) Upper Canada	For private owner.
Unknown date	Adriatic	Merchantman			United States	For private owner.
Unknown date	Agamemnon	Merchantman		Sunderland	United Kingdom	For Mr. Nicholson.
Unknown date	Ajax	Transport ship	Wright & Harle	South Shields	United Kingdom	For private owner.
Unknown date	Albuera	Merchantman		Sunderland	United Kingdom	For Mr Saunders.
Unknown date	Alexander	Merchantman			United States	For private owner.
Unknown date	Alexander	Full-rigged ship	Reay	Hylton (North Hylton or South Hylton, Sunderland; the source does not specify)	United Kingdom	For private owner.
Unknown date	Ariane	Ariane-class frigate		Nantes	France	For French Navy.
Unknown date	Atlas	Merchantman	T. Barrick	Whitby	United Kingdom	For T. Barrick.
Unknown date	Auguste	Privateer			France	For Robert Surcouf.
Unknown date	Babiole	Privateer		La Ciotat	France	For private owner.
Unknown date	Barton	Merchantman	Barkworth & Hawkes	Hull	United Kingdom	For Mr. Barkworth.
Unknown date	Benson	Merchantman	Sam Finch	St. Patrick, Quebec	(United Kingdom of Great Britain and Ireland) Upper Canada	For Benson & Co.
Unknown date	Blenden Hall	Full-rigged ship	John Tyson & Richard Blake	Bursledon	United Kingdom	For Swan & Co.
Unknown date	Brailsford	Merchantman		Hull	United Kingdom	For private owner.
Unknown date	Brave	Brig	James Crown	Sunderland	United Kingdom	For private owner.
Unknown date	Caledonian	West Indiaman		Barnstaple	United Kingdom	For William Scott.
Unknown date	Canada	Merchantman	D Munn	Montreal	(United Kingdom of Great Britain and Ireland) Upper Canada	For private owner.
Unknown date	Catherine	Merchantman		New Bedford, Massachusetts	United States	For S Russell.
Unknown date	Coquille	Barge		Toulon	France	For private owner.
Unknown date	Cyrus	Transport ship	Holt & Richardson	Whitby	United Kingdom	For Holt & Skinner.
Unknown date	Dauntless	Brig		Monkwearmouth	United Kingdom	For private owner.
Unknown date	Earl of Balcarras	East Indiaman		Bombay	India	For British East India Company.
Unknown date	Eliza	Merchantman		Calcutta	India	For private owner.
Unknown date	Eliza	Full-rigged ship		Hull	United Kingdom	For private owner.
Unknown date	Friends Good Will	Sloop	Oliver Williams	River Rouge, Michigan	United States	For Oliver Williams.
Unknown date	General Hewett	Merchantman	Matthew Smith	Howrah	India	For private owner.
Unknown date	Glory	Merchantman		William Henry	(United Kingdom of Great Britain and Ireland) Lower Canada	For private owner.
Unknown date	Grace	Full-rigged ship		Ipswich	United Kingdom	For Bond & Co.
Unknown date	Hannah	Full-rigged ship		Bombay	India	For private owner.
Unknown date	Harvest	Merchantman	Moses Wilkinson	Sunderland	United Kingdom	For Bartholomew Thomas and Moses Wilkinson.
Unknown date	Hawkesbury Packet	Sloop			(United Kingdom of Great Britain and Ireland) New South Wales	For Solomon Wiseman.
Unknown date	Hermes	Merchantman		Montreal	(United Kingdom of Great Britain and Ireland) Lower Canada	For private owner.
Unknown date	Highflyer	Schooner		Dorchester County, Maryland	United States	For private owner.
Unknown date	Hinchinbrook	Cutter		Bridport	United Kingdom	For Post Office Packet Service.
Unknown date	Home Castle	Merchantman		Aberdeen	United Kingdom	For private owner.
Unknown date	Inconstant	Brig			France	For private owner.
Unknown date	Independence	Schooner			United States	For private owner.
Unknown date	Iris	Merchantman	Cuthbert Young	South Shields	United Kingdom	For private owner.
Unknown date	Isaac Todd	Merchantman		Quebec	(United Kingdom of Great Britain and Ireland) Lower Canada	For John McTavish.
Unknown date	Kennersley Castle	Snow	William Smoult Temple	Jarrow	United Kingdom	For Mr. Temple.
Unknown date	Laura	Full-rigged ship		Sunderland	United Kingdom	For private owner.
Unknown date	L'Edouard	Privateer		Saint-Malo	France	For Robert Surcouf.
Unknown date	Lottery	Schooner	Talbot Co.	Maryland	United States	For Massachusetts State Navy.
Unknown date	Lady Mary Pelham	Brig		Falmouth	United Kingdom	For Post Office Packet Service.
Unknown date	Lord Wellington	Merchantman		Montreal	(United Kingdom of Great Britain and Ireland) Lower Canada	For private owner.
Unknown date	Lord Wellington	Merchantman		Quebec	(United Kingdom of Great Britain and Ireland) Lower Canada	For private owner.
Unknown date	Lord Wellington	Transport ship	J. Langbourne & Co.	Whitby	United Kingdom	For Joseph Holt Jr., Champion Coates and John Richardson.
Unknown date	Lord Wellington	Merchantman		Great Yarmouth	United Kingdom	For J. Preston.
Unknown date	Margaret	Merchantman	John & Philip Laing	Sunderland	United Kingdom	For J. Brown & Co.
Unknown date	Majestic	Merchantman	John & Philip Laing	Sunderland	United Kingdom	For Mr. Mellish.
Unknown date	Marcellus	Merchantman		Boston, Massachusetts	United States	For private owner.
Unknown date	Minerva	East Indiaman		Bombay	India	For British East India Company.
Unknown date	Newfoundland	Merchantman	T. Owen	Hull	United Kingdom	For private owner.
Unknown date	Nymph	Merchantman	John & Philip Laing	Sunderland	United Kingdom	For private owner.
Unknown date	Perceval	Merchantman	J. White & J. Young	Sunderland	United Kingdom	For private owner.
Unknown date	Peter Waldo	Merchantman	Anthony Landers	Plymouth	United Kingdom	For private owner.
Unknown date	Price	Schooner		Baltimore, Maryland	United States	For John Hollins, John Smith Hollins and Michael McBlair.
Unknown date	Prince Regent	West Indiaman	Francis Hurry & Co.	Howdon Pans	United Kingdom	For Francis Hurry & Co.
Unknown date	Prince Regent	Merchantman		Montreal	(United Kingdom of Great Britain and Ireland) Upper Canada	For private owner.
Unknown date	Queen Elizabeth	Merchantman		Pownal Bay	(United Kingdom of Great Britain and Ireland) Prince Edward Island	For private owner.
Unknown date	Racer	Privateer	Talbot & Co.	Baltimore, Maryland	United States	For George J. Brown, John G. Brown, George P. Stephenson and William Hollins.
Unknown date	Rachel	Brig		Terrebonne	(United Kingdom of Great Britain and Ireland) Lower Canada	For private owner.
Unknown date	Richmond	West Indiaman		Itchenor	United Kingdom	For private owner.
Unknown date	Sarah Ann	Privateer		St. Mary's County, Maryland	United States	For Dutton Williams, James Ramsey, Charles Malloy and John Craig.
Unknown date	Sir James Henry Craig	Merchantman	Bell & Robitaille	Quebec	(United Kingdom of Great Britain and Ireland) Lower Canada	For private owner.
Unknown date	Surry	Transport ship		Harwich	United Kingdom	For Mr. Mangles.
Unknown date	Vere	Barque		Chester	United Kingdom	For France & Co.
Unknown date	William	Merchantman		Blyth	United Kingdom	For private owner.
Unknown date	William	Whaler		Hull	United Kingdom	For Mr. Marshall.
Unknown date	Name unknown	Merchantman			United States	For private owner.
Unknown date	Ulverstone	Full-rigged ship		Ulverstone	United Kingdom	For private owner.
Unknown date	Name unknown	Schooner		Baltimore, Maryland	United States	For private owner.
Unknown date	Name unknown	Merchantman		Newburyport, Massachusetts	United States	For private owner.
