= Lord Wellington (ship) =

Several ships have been named Lord Wellington for Arthur Wellesley, 1st Duke of Wellington:

- Lord Wellington (1809 ship) was launched at Shields. She initially sailed as a London-based transport and then made two voyages to India and one to Mauritius. Thereafter she traded widely until she was condemned c.1842.
- Lord Wellington (1810 ship) was launched at Rochester, or equally, Chatham, as a West Indiaman. She made at least one voyage to India under a license from the British East India Company (EIC). She then made a voyage to New South Wales transporting female convicts from England and Ireland. She was lost in December 1822 off Denmark while sailing from Saint Petersburg to London.
- Lord Wellington (1810 Hull ship) was a whaler in the northern whale fishery that made some 20 whaling voyages. She was lost in June 1834.
- Lord Wellington (1811 ship) was launched at Whitby as a London-based transport. She made one voyage to India c.1816. She sank in May 1823 after striking an iceberg in the North Atlantic.
- Lord Wellington (1811 Montreal ship) was launched in Montreal. She was a London-based transport that made one voyage to India in 1819 under a license from the British East India Company (EIC). Afterwards she continued to sail to the Baltic and North America. She was last listed in 1829.
- Lord Wellington (1811 Quebec ship) was launched in 1811 in Quebec and in 1812 changed her registry to London. She spent most of her career sailing between Great Britain and North America, though she spent her last few years as a coastal collier. In 1832 she was the site of an outbreak of cholera that killed several passengers and crew. She was last listed in 1844.
- Lord Wellington (1811 Yarmouth ship) was launched at Great Yarmouth. She was a West Indiaman but in 1820 made one voyage to India under license from the British East India Company (EIC). Her crew abandoned her in the North Atlantic in July 1825 when she became waterlogged.
- Lord Wellington, Clephan, master, was a brig that the American privateer Sparrow captured in early 1813 as Lord Wellington was sailing from Halifax, Nova Scotia, to Jamaica. HMS Moselle recaptured Lord Wellington, Cliphane, master, on 16 January 1813.
