= List of shipwrecks in February 1824 =

The list of shipwrecks in February 1824 includes some ships sunk, foundered, grounded, or otherwise lost during February 1824.

== 1 February ==
List of shipwrecks: 1 February 1824
Ship	State	Description
Birkby	United Kingdom	The ship was lost in the Colorados Archipelago, Cuba. She was on a voyage from Campeche, Mexico to Liverpool, Lancashire.
Hector	United States	The ship was wrecked on the Isaacs with the loss of all but four of her crew. She was on a voyage from Portsmouth, New Hampshire to New Orleans, Louisiana.
Perseverance	United States	The ship was wrecked on the Isaacs with the loss of all but one of her crew. She was on a voyage from Portsmouth, New Hampshire to New Orleans.

== 2 February ==
List of shipwrecks: 2 February 1824
Ship	State	Description
Fame	United Kingdom	The East Indiaman was destroyed by fire off Bengkulu, Sumatra before 29 May. All on board were rescued by an American schooner. She was on a voyage from Bengkulu to London.
Mary	United Kingdom	The ship departed from Terceira, Azores, Portugal for Liverpool, Lancashire. Reported to have subsequently capsized with the loss of all hands.
Nyade	Sweden	The ship was captured by pirates off the Isle of Pines, Cuba. She was beached and burnt the next day.
William Pitt	(United Kingdom of Great Britain and Ireland) British North America	The ship was lost at Beaver River, Nova Scotia. Her crew were rescued. She was on a voyage from Demerara to St. Andrew, New Brunswick.

== 4 February ==
List of shipwrecks: 4 February 1824
Ship	State	Description
Dorset	United Kingdom	The ship was lost near La Orotava, Tenerife, Spain. She was on a voyage from Tenerife to London.

== 5 February ==
List of shipwrecks: 5 February 1824
Ship	State	Description
John	United Kingdom	The schooner was driven ashore and wrecked at Holyhead, Anglesey with the loss of thirteen of the nineteen people on board. She was on a voyage from Cork to Liverpool, Lancashire.

== 6 February ==
List of shipwrecks: 6 February 1824
Ship	State	Description
Columbine	United Kingdom	The ship was driven ashore and wrecked in the River Plate. She was on a voyage from Liverpool to Buenos Aires, Argentina.
Union	United Kingdom	The ship was driven ashore in the Bay of Glenelg. Her crew were rescued. She was on a voyage from Bangor to Berwick upon Tweed, Northumberland.

== 7 February ==
List of shipwrecks: 7 February 1824
Ship	State	Description
Peggy	United Kingdom	The ship was driven ashore and wrecked at Wemyss, Fife with the loss of all four people on board. She was on a voyage from Wemyss to Leith, Lothian.
Union	United Kingdom	The brig was driven ashore at Glenelg, Ross-shire. She was on a voyage from Bangor, Caernarfonshire to Berwick-upon-Tweed, Northumberland.
Voltaire	France	The ship was wrecked on the Hogsty Reef. Her crew survived. She was on a voyage from Port-au-Prince, Haiti to Havre de Grâce, Seine-Inférieure.

== 8 February ==
List of shipwrecks: 8 February 1824
Ship	State	Description
Aurora	United Kingdom	The ship was driven ashore at Allonby, Cumberland. She was refloated on 14 February and taken in to Whitehaven, Cumberland.
Nautilus	United States	The ship foundered in the Mediterranean Sea east of the Isla de Alborán, Spain. Her crew were rescued by Upton (United Kingdom). She was on a voyage from New York to Marseille, Bouches-du-Rhône, France.

== 9 February ==
List of shipwrecks: 9 February 1824
Ship	State	Description
Joseph	United States	The ship was wrecked on North Uist, Outer Hebrides, United Kingdom. She was on a voyage from Philadelphia, Pennsylvania to Londonderry, United Kingdom.

== 10 February ==
List of shipwrecks: 10 February 1824
Ship	State	Description
Andromeda	Portugal	The ship was wrecked near False Point, India. All on board were rescued. She was on a voyage from China to Bengal, India.
Favorite	United Kingdom	The ship was wrecked at Holyhead, Anglesey. She was on a voyage from Liverpool, Lancashire to an African port.

== 11 February ==
List of shipwrecks: 11 February 1824
Ship	State	Description
Anine	United Kingdom	The ship was driven ashore at Ramsey, Isle of Man.
Johanna	Danzig	The ship was driven ashore at "Webeck", Denmark. She was on a voyage from Danzig to London, United Kingdom.
Maria	United Kingdom	The ship departed from Belfast, County Antrim for Bahia, Brazil. No further trace, presumed foundered with the loss of all hands.

== 12 February ==
List of shipwrecks: 12 February 1824
Ship	State	Description
Fox	United Kingdom	The sloop capsized in a squall off Great Cumbrae, Buteshire with the loss of five of her twelve passengers.

== 13 February ==
List of shipwrecks: 13 February 1824
Ship	State	Description
Columbine	United Kingdom	The ship ran aground "off the Embudo". She was on a voyage from Liverpool, Lancashire to Buenos Aires, Argentina. Columbine was refloated on 1 March and taken in to Ensenada, Buenos Aires.

== 14 February ==
List of shipwrecks: 14 February 1824
Ship	State	Description
Friendship	United Kingdom	The sloop was wrecked at Howth, County Dublin. Her crew were rescued. She was on a voyage from Whitehaven, Cumberland to Bray, County Wicklow.
Mayflower	United Kingdom	The ship was abandoned in the English Channel. Her crew were rescued by Diamond (United Kingdom). Mayflower was on a voyage from Plymouth, Devon to Penzance, Cornwall.
Po	United Kingdom	The ship was wrecked on the Dunbar Sand, off Padstow, Cornwall. She was on a voyage from Llanelli, Glamorgan to Hayle, Cornwall. Po was refloated on 16 February and taken in to Padstow.

== 16 February ==
List of shipwrecks: 16 February 1824
Ship	State	Description
Concordia	Netherlands	The ship sprang a leak and foundered in the Mediterranean Sea between Corsica, France and Genoa, Kingdom of Sardinia. All on board survived. She was on a voyage from Livorno, Grand Duchy of Tuscany to Amsterdam, North Holland.

== 17 February ==
List of shipwrecks: 17 February 1824
Ship	State	Description
Nautilus	United Kingdom	The ship departed from Trinidad for London. No further trace, presumed foundered with the loss of all hands.

== 18 February ==
List of shipwrecks: 18 February 1824
Ship	State	Description
Favourite	United States	The ship was driven ashore east of Red Bank, New Jersey. She was on a voyage from New York to Greenock, Renfrewshire, United Kingdom.
Henry	United Kingdom	The ship ran aground on the Herd Sand, in the North Sea off the coast of County Durham and was severely damaged.
Swiftsure	United Kingdom	The ship was driven ashore at the Spanish Beach, Gibraltar. She was refloated on 23 February and taken in to Gibraltar.
Terwan	United Kingdom	The ship sprang a leak and was beached at North Shields, County Durham.

== 19 February ==
List of shipwrecks: 19 February 1824
Ship	State	Description
Lord Wellington	United Kingdom	The ship was driven ashore at Cranfield Point, County Down. She was on a voyage from Liverpool, Lancashire to Newry, County Down.
Swiftsure	United Kingdom	The ship was driven ashore on Spanish Beach, Gibraltar. She was on a voyage from Gibraltar to London.

== 20 February ==
List of shipwrecks: 20 February 1824
Ship	State	Description
Federal George	United States	The ship was wrecked off Scituate, Massachusetts. Her crew were rescued. She was on a voyage from Philadelphia, Pennsylvania to Boston, Massachusetts.
Plantagenet	United Kingdom	The ship was wrecked off Charleston, South Carolina, United States. Her crew survived. She was on a voyage from Liverpool, Lancashire to Charleston.

== 22 February ==
List of shipwrecks: 22 February 1824
Ship	State	Description
HMS Delight	Royal Navy	The Cherokee-class brig-sloop foundered in the Indian Ocean off Mauritius with the loss of all 75 crew and that of 110 recaptured slaves.

== 23 February ==
List of shipwrecks: 23 February 1824
Ship	State	Description
Albion	United Kingdom	The full-rigged ship was driven ashore at Port Louis, Mauritius. She was later refloated, repaired and returned to service.
Alfred	United Kingdom	The lugger was driven ashore at Port Louis.
Andromaque	France	The full-rigged ship was driven ashore on Mauritius.
Angelica	United Kingdom	The full-rigged ship was driven ashore at Port Louis.
Ann	United Kingdom	The full-rigged ship was driven ashore at Port Louis.
Barrosa	United Kingdom	The full-rigged ship was driven ashore at Port Louis. She was later refloated and repaired.
Cecilie	France	The ship was driven ashore on Île Bourbon.
Cherriby	United Kingdom	The lugger was driven ashore at Port Louis.
Clelie	United Kingdom	The brig sank at Port Louis.
Clio	United States	The ship was lost on Grand Bahama. She was on a voyage from Bath, Maine to Havana, Cuba.
Concorde	United States	The full-rigged ship was driven ashore and wrecked at Mauritius.
Crown	United Kingdom	The galiot was driven ashore at Port Louis.
HMS Delight	Royal Navy	The Cherokee-class brig sloop foundered off Mauritius.
Ernest	United Kingdom	The full-rigged ship was driven ashore at Port Louis.
Felicie	France	The brig was driven ashore on Mauritius.
George IV	United Kingdom	The full-rigged ship was driven ashore at Port Louis. She was subsequently repaired.
Governor Billie	Denmark	The full-rigged ship was driven ashore and wrecked at Port Louis. She was on a voyage from Batavia, Netherlands East Indies to Copenhagen
Governor Brisbane	United Kingdom	The brig was driven ashore and wrecked at Port Louis.
Governor Phillips	United Kingdom	The brig was driven ashore at Port Louis.
Gustave	United Kingdom	The brig was driven ashore on Mauritius.
Java	United States	The brig was driven ashore at Port Louis.
L'Indien	France	The ship was driven ashore on Mauritius.
Nancy	United Kingdom	Captain Adler's brig was driven ashore at Port Louis.
Nancy	United Kingdom	Captain Clarkson's brig was driven ashore at Port Louis.
Peace	United Kingdom	The lugger was wrecked at Port Louis.
Scythe	France	The brig was driven ashore and wrecked on Mauritius.
Seraphime	United Kingdom	The galiot was driven ashore at Port Louis.
Suzanne	France	The brig was driven ashore and severely damaged on Mauritius.
Ventienne	United Kingdom	The ship was driven ashore on Île Bourbon.
Young Laura	United Kingdom	The ship full-rigged ship was driven ashore and wrecked at Port Louis.
Young Mary	United Kingdom	The brig was driven ashore at Port Louis.
Young Olympe	United Kingdom	The brig sank at Port Louis.
Young Theodore	United Kingdom	The galiot was driven ashore at Port Louis.

== 24 February ==
List of shipwrecks: 24 February 1824
Ship	State	Description
George IV	United Kingdom	The ship was wrecked on the Carysfort Reef, in the Atlantic Ocean off the coast of the Florida Territory. Her crew were rescued. She was on a voyage from British Honduras to London.

== 25 February ==
List of shipwrecks: 25 February 1824
Ship	State	Description
Jean Bart	France	The ship was driven ashore and wrecked on Île Bourbon. Her crew were rescued.
Magicienne	France	The ship was driven ashore and wrecked on Île Bourbon. Her crew were rescued.
Sylph	France	The ship was driven ashore and wrecked on Île Bourbon. Her crew were rescued.
Tippoo Sain	France	The ship was driven ashore and wrecked on Île Bourbon. Her crew were rescued.

== 26 February ==
List of shipwrecks: 26 February 1824
Ship	State	Description
Concordia	Netherlands	The ship sprang a leak and foundered in the Tyrrhenian Sea. All on board survived. She was on a voyage from Livorno, Kingdom of Sardinia to Amsterdam, North Holland.

== 27 February ==
List of shipwrecks: 27 February 1824
Ship	State	Description
Barton	United Kingdom	The ship was wrecked on the Haisborough Sands, in the North Sea off the coast of Norfolk.
Marquis of Drogheda	United Kingdom	The ship ran aground and capsized in Courtmasherry Bay. She was on a voyage from Terceira Island, Azores to Cork.
Rialto	United Kingdom	The ship was lost on Haisborough Sands, in the North Sea off the coast of Norfolk. Her crew were rescued.

== 29 February ==
List of shipwrecks: 29 February 1824
Ship	State	Description
Vriendschap	Netherlands	The ship departed from Vlissingen, Zeeland for London, United Kingdom. No further trace, presumed foundered in the North Sea with the loss of all hands.

== Unknown date ==
List of shipwrecks: Unknown date in February 1824
Ship	State	Description
Dart	United Kingdom	The ship departed from Salcombe, Devon for Portsmouth, Hampshire. No further trace, presumed foundered with the loss of all hands.
Deux Frères	France	The brig was abandoned in the Atlantic Ocean in late February. Her crew were rescued by Carl Johan (Sweden). She was on a voyage from St. Ubes, Spain to Dunkirk, Nord.
Draper	United Kingdom	The ship was driven ashore at New York, United States in late February. She was on a voyage from New York to Londonderry.
Favourite	United Kingdom	The ship was driven ashore and wrecked at New York in late February. She was on a voyage from New York to Greenock, Renfrewshire.
George	United Kingdom	The ship was driven ashore and wrecked at Dungarvan, County Waterford in early February. She was on a voyage from Quebec City, Lower Canada, British North America to Liverpool, Lancashire.
Hannah	(United Kingdom of Great Britain and Ireland) British North America	The schooner was abandoned in the Atlantic Ocean 150 nautical miles (280 km) west of Cape Clear Island, County Cork. Her crew were rescued by Restoration (United Kingdom). Hannah was on a voyage from Saint John, New Brunswick to Liverpool. She was towed in to Falmouth, Cornwall on 4 May.
Victory	United Kingdom	The ship was wrecked at West Quoddy, Nova Scotia, British North America. Her crew were rescued. She was on a voyage from Saint John, New Brunswick, British North America to Liverpool, Lancashire.
