= True Briton =

(The) True Briton may refer to:

- The True Briton (magazine), an English weekly magazine
- True Briton (ship) – one of several vessels by that name
- True Briton (East Indiaman)– one of four vessels by that name that sailed for the British East India Company
