= List of shipwrecks in February 1820 =

The list of shipwrecks in February 1820 includes ships sunk, foundered, grounded, or otherwise lost during February 1820.

== 1 February ==
List of shipwrecks: 1 February 1820
Ship	State	Description
General Miranda	United Kingdom	The ship was wrecked near Cape Sable Island, Nova Scotia, British North America. She was on a voyage from Saint Andrews, New Brunswick, British North America to Tobago.
Two unnamed vessels	United Kingdom	The ships were driven ashore ear Bayonne, Pyrenées-Atlantiques, France.

== 2 February ==
List of shipwrecks: 2 February 1820
Ship	State	Description
Boldon	United Kingdom	The ship was driven ashore and wrecked at Sunderland, County Durham.

== 3 February ==
List of shipwrecks: 3 February 1820
Ship	State	Description
Theodosia	United Kingdom	The ship caught fire and was abandoned. All on board were rescued. She was on a voyage from Table Bay to Algoa Bay.

== 4 February ==
List of shipwrecks: 4 February 1820
Ship	State	Description
Janson	Netherlands	The ship was sunk by ice in the North Sea off Den Helder, North Holland. Her crew were rescued.
Uranie	French Navy	The corvette struck a rock in Berkley Sound, East Falkland, Falkland Islands. She was beached on 6 February in French Bay. Her 120 crew were later rescued by Mercury (France). Uranie was on a voyage from New Holland to Rio de Janeiro, Brazil.

== 5 February ==
List of shipwrecks: 5 February 1820
Ship	State	Description
New Triton	United Kingdom	The ship was driven ashore near St. Bees Head, Cumberland. She was on a voyage from Douglas, Isle of Man to Whitehaven, Cumberland.

== 6 February ==
List of shipwrecks: 6 February 1820
Ship	State	Description
Diana	United Kingdom	The ship struck a rock and sank near Loch Tarbert. Her crew were rescued. She was on a voyage from Limerick to Liverpool, Lancashire.
Louisa Elizabeth	Netherlands	The ship was lost near Hellevoetsluis, South Holland. She was on a voyage from Rouen, Seine-Inférieure, France to Rotterdam, South Holland.
Mary & Betty	United Kingdom	The ship was driven ashore and sank at St. Bees Head, Cumberland.
Moira	United Kingdom	The ship was driven ashore and wrecked near Westport, County Mayo. She was on a voyage from São Miguel Island, Azores to Liverpool, Lancashire.

== 7 February ==
List of shipwrecks: 7 February 1820
Ship	State	Description
John & James	United Kingdom	The ship was driven ashore near St. Alban's Head, Dorset. She was on a voyage from Plymouth, Devon to Portsmouth, Hampshire.

== 9 February ==
List of shipwrecks: 9 February 1820
Ship	State	Description
Cupido	Sweden	The ship was wrecked in the Weser. Her crew were rescued. She was on a voyage from the Weser to Gothenburg.
Three Brothers	United States	The ship was driven ashore and wrecked at Cape Cod, Massachusetts.

== 10 February ==
List of shipwrecks: 10 February 1820
Ship	State	Description
Fox	United Kingdom	The ship was abandoned in the North Sea. She was subsequently taken in to Whitby, Yorkshire in a waterlogged condition.
Harry Morris	United Kingdom	The ship struck a rock and sank off Whitby. She was on a voyage from South Shields, County Durham to London.
William	United Kingdom	The ship was driven ashore near Newport, Rhode Island, United States. She was on a voyage from New York, United States to Halifax, Nova Scotia, British North America.

== 11 February ==
List of shipwrecks: 11 February 1820
Ship	State	Description
Peggy	United Kingdom	The ship was lost off the Isle of Rhum. Her crew were rescued. She was on a voyage from Sligo to Glasgow, Renfrewshire.

== 14 February ==
List of shipwrecks: 14 February 1820
Ship	State	Description
Ann	United Kingdom	The ship was driven ashore at Teignmouth, Devon.
Prince of Wales	United Kingdom	The ship was driven ashore and capsized at Brighton, Sussex. She was deemed beyond repair.

=== 15 February ===
List of shipwrecks: 15 February 1820
Ship	State	Description
Hamilton	United Kingdom	The ship was driven ashore by ice at Cuxhaven.

== =16 February ==
List of shipwrecks: 16 February 1820
Ship	State	Description
Helen	United Kingdom	The ship was driven ashore at Ardgowan, Renfrewshire. She was on a voyage from Greenock, Renfrewshire to Jamaica.

== 17 February ==
List of shipwrecks: 17 February 1820
Ship	State	Description
Active	United Kingdom	The ship was driven ashore in Prince's Bay, New York City, United States. She was on a voyage from Martinique to New York.
Helen	France	The ship was driven ashore and wrecked at Southampton, New York, United States. She was on a voyage from Bordeaux, Gironde to New York.
Mary	United Kingdom	The ship was wrecked on the Cold Spring Bar, in the Atlantic Ocean off the coast of New Jersey. She was on a voyage from Saint Thomas, Virgin Islands to New York.
Midas	United States	The ship was run down and sunk off Boston, Massachusetts. She was on a voyage from Santo Domingo, Hispaniola to Boston.
Ogland	Norway	The sloop was wrecked at Burrafeith, Uist, Outer Hebrides, United Kingdom. Her crew were rescued. She was on a voyage from a Danish port to Iceland.
Port of Sunderland	United Kingdom	The ship was wrecked on the Isle of Whithorn, Cumberland. She was on a voyage from Miramichi Bay to Maryport, Cumberland and Kirkcudbright.
Unnamed	United Kingdom	The brig was driven ashore in Bracknell Cove, New York, United States.

== 18 February ==
List of shipwrecks: 18 February 1820
Ship	State	Description
Sans Souel	United Kingdom	The ship foundered off "Point Galico de Zamba". Her crew were rescued. She was on a voyage from Jamaica to India.

== 19 February ==
List of shipwrecks: 19 February 1820
Ship	State	Description
Fortuna	Kingdom of the Two Sicilies	The schooner was wrecked at Cape Carbonara, Kingdom of Sardinia. She was on a voyage from Tunis, Beylik of Tunis to Naples.
Mars	France	The ship was wrecked at Cape St. Mary's, Portugal. Her crew were rescued. She was on a voyage from Havre de Grâce, Seine-Inférieure to Sète, Hérault.

== 20 February ==
List of shipwrecks: 20 February 1820
Ship	State	Description
Belle Adele	France	The ship was wrecked at Wilmington, Delaware, United States. She was on a voyage from Havana, Cuba to Wilmington.
Quebec Packet	United Kingdom	The ship was abandoned off the Shipwash Sand, in the North Sea. She was taken in to Harwich, Essex in a waterlogged condition the next day.
William and Mary	United Kingdom	The ship was driven ashore at Ballyhack, County Wexford. She was on a voyage from Ross to Youghal, County Cork.

== 22 February ==
List of shipwrecks: 22 February 1820
Ship	State	Description
Fancy	United Kingdom	The ship was driven ashore near Vlissingen, Zeeland, Netherlands. She was on a voyage from Antwerp, Netherlands to Hull, Yorkshire. She was refloated.
Success	United Kingdom	The ship ran aground on the Herd Sand, in the North Sea off South Shields, County Durham. Her crew were rescued by the South Shields Lifeboat. Success was on a voyage from Littlehampton, Sussex to Newcastle upon Tyne, Northumberland. She was refloated on 17 March and taken in to South Shields.

== 24 February ==
List of shipwrecks: 24 February 1820
Ship	State	Description
Harbinger	United Kingdom	The ship was driven ashore at Wells-next-the-Sea, Norfolk. She was on a voyage from London to Scarborough, Yorkshire. Harbinger was refloated on 26 February.
Perfect	United Kingdom	The brig was driven ashore and wrecked at Aberdeen. Her crew were rescued. She was on a voyage from Savannah, Georgia, United States to Aberdeen.

== 25 February ==
List of shipwrecks: 25 February 1820
Ship	State	Description
Dolphin	United Kingdom	The ship was wrecked in Red Wharf Bay with the loss of five of the twenty people on board. She was on a voyage from Liverpool, Lancashire to New Providence, Bahamas.
Elizabeth & Sally	United Kingdom	The ship was driven ashore at Beaumaris, Anglesey. She was on a voyage from Tralee, County Kerry to Liverpool.
Friends	United Kingdom	Captain Mearns's sloop was driven ashore and wrecked at Bridlington, Yorkshire with the loss of all four people on board.
Friends	United Kingdom	Captain Payne's ship was driven ashore and wrecked at Bridlington. Her crew were rescued.
San Fidel	Spain	The ship struck rocks off Gibraltar and foundered. She was on a voyage from "Caril" to Algeciras.

== 26 February ==
List of shipwrecks: 26 February 1820
Ship	State	Description
Alexandrine	France	The ship ran aground at Saint-Vaast-la-Hougue, Manche. She was on a voyage from London, United Kingdom to Rouen, Seine-Inférieure. She was refloated on 20 April and taken in to Rouen, Seine-Inférieure.
Dolphin	United Kingdom	The ship ran aground and capsized at Dover, Kent. She was on a voyage from Messina, Sicily to Saint Petersburg, Russia.
Flirt	United Kingdom	The ship fouled her anchor and was beached in Swanage Bay. She later sank but was refloated and taken in to Poole, Dorset Flirt was on a voyage from Dunbar, Lothian to Bristol, Gloucestershire.
Maria	United Kingdom	The ship ran aground at Poole, Dorset. She was refloated and taken in to Studland Bay for repairs.
Neapolitan	France	The ship was driven ashore at Saint-Vaast-la-Hougue. She was on a voyage from Málaga, Spain to Havre de Grâce, Seine-Inférieure.
Star	United Kingdom	The ship was severely damaged by fire at Rotherhithe, Surrey. She was on a voyage from London to Saint Petersburg.

== 27 February ==
List of shipwrecks: 27 February 1820
Ship	State	Description
Albion	United States	The ship was driven ashore and wrecked at Ballyteague, County Wexford, United Kingdom Her crew were rescued. She was on a voyage from Charleston, South Carolina to Liverpool, Lancashire, United Kingdom.
Star	United Kingdom	The ship was severely damaged by fire at Rotherhithe, Surrey.

== 28 February ==
List of shipwrecks: 28 February 1820
Ship	State	Description
Armavilla	United Kingdom	The ship capsized in the Atlantic Ocean (38°N 17°W). Six crew were rescued by John Bulkley (United Kingdom). Armavilla was on a voyage from New Brunswick, British North America to Saint Vincent.
Little Belt	United Kingdom	The ship was wrecked at Cape Palos, Spain. She was on a voyage from Palermo, Sicily to London.
Prince Regent	United Kingdom	The ship ran aground in the River Thames at Gravesend, Kent. She was on a voyage from London to Bombay, India and China. Prince Regent was later refloated.
Respect	United Kingdom	The ship was lost off Skagen, Denmark. Her crew were rescued. She was on a voyage from Sunderland, County Durham to Randers, Denmark.
Prosperity	United Kingdom	The ship was wrecked in the North Sea. She put in to Hull, Yorkshire.

== 29 February ==
List of shipwrecks: 29 February 1820
Ship	State	Description
John and Charlotte	United Kingdom	The ship ran aground at North Shields, Northumberland. She was on a voyage from North Shields to London. She was refloated and resumed her voyage.
Roberts	United Kingdom	The ship ran aground at North Shields. She was on a voyage from North Shields to London. She was refloated and resumed her voyage.

== Unknown date ==
List of shipwrecks: Unknown date in February 1820
Ship	State	Description
Alert	United Kingdom	The brig was struck by lightning off Cape St. Mary's, Portugal and foundered. Her crew were rescued. She was on a voyage from Trieste to Hamburg.
Amie	(United Kingdom of Great Britain and Ireland) Grenada	The drogher was wrecked at Saint Lucia.
Duke of Wellington	United Kingdom	The ship was driven ashore at Batavia, Netherlands East Indies in early February.
Eolus	United Kingdom	The ship was wrecked near Saint Andrew, New Brunswick, British North America. She was on a voyage from Barbadoes to Saint Andrew.
Friends	United Kingdom	The ship was driven ashore near Carrickfergus, County Antrim.
Endeavour	United Kingdom	The ship was driven ashore near Carrickfergus.
Fame	United Kingdom	The ship was run aground on a sandbank 18 nautical miles (33 km) off mouth of the Demerara River. All on board were rescued. She was on a voyage from London to Demerara. Fame was later refloated but ran aground again in the Demerara River and was subsequently sold. She was refloated in June.
Fanny	United Kingdom	The ship was lost off Lambay Island, County Dublin. She was on a voyage from Irvine, Ayrshire to Dublin.
Heroine	United States	The ship was lost at Bermuda.
Isabella	United Kingdom	The ship was driven ashore and wrecked between "Abavy" and "Mahacooy" in early February. Her crew were rescued. She was on a voyage from London to Essequibo, British Guiana. She was refloated on 27 February.
Jeanne	France	The brig was wrecked near Falmouth, Cornwall, United Kingdom. She was on a voyage from Bordeaux, Gironde to Havre de Grâce, Seine-Inférieure.
Jubilee	United Kingdom	The schooner sprang a leak and was beached at Coleraine, County Antrim.
Kitty	United Kingdom	The ship sank at Dún Laoghaire, County Dublin. She was on a voyage from Killala, County Cork to Liverpool, Lancashire.
Lord Wellington	(United Kingdom of Great Britain and Ireland) Tortola	The schooner was wrecked on the north coast of St. John, Virgin Islands in mid-February. She was on a voyage from Puerto Rico to Tortola.
Mariner	United Kingdom	The ship was driven ashore near Castletown, Isle of Man. She was on a voyage from Dublin to Maryport.
Mary	(United Kingdom of Great Britain and Ireland) Grenada	The sloop was wrecked near Levera, Grenada before 9 February.
May	(United Kingdom of Great Britain and Ireland) British North America	The ship was wrecked on "Bridger's Island", New York, United States with the loss of all hands.
Onderneming	Netherlands	The ship was driven ashore on the Dutch coast. She was on a voyage from Genoa, Grand Duchy of Tuscany to Amsterdam, North Holland.
Santa Croce	Grand Duchy of Tuscany	The ship departed from Gibraltar for Genoa. No further trace, presumed foundered in the Mediterranean Sea with the loss of all hands.
Sophie	France	The ship foundered in the English Channel off Honfleur, Calvados. She was on a voyage from Rouen, Seine-Inférieure to London, United Kingdom.
Susannah	United States	The schooner was abandoned in the Atlantic Ocean on or before 24 February.
Vine	United Kingdom	The ship foundered off Islay in mid-February.
