= List of shipwrecks in August 1820 =

The list of shipwrecks in August 1820 includes ships sunk, wrecked or otherwise lost during August 1820.

== 1 August ==
List of shipwrecks: 1 August 1820
Ship	State	Description
Malsham	(United Kingdom of Great Britain and Ireland) British North America	The steamboat ran aground at Montreal, Quebec.
Superior	United Kingdom	The ship was driven ashore on Rathlin Island, County Antrim. She was on a voyage from Liverpool, Lancashire to Philadelphia, Pennsylvania, United States. Superior was later refloated and resumed her voyage.

== 2 August ==
List of shipwrecks: 2 August 1820
Ship	State	Description
Concord	United Kingdom	The ship foundered in the North Sea off Lindisfarne, Northumberland with the loss of all but one of her crew. The survivor was rescued by Inverness Packet (United Kingdom). Concord was on a voyage from Perth to London.

== 3 August ==
List of shipwrecks: 3 August 1820
Ship	State	Description
Hope	United Kingdom	The ship sprang a leak and was beached at Orford Haven, Suffolk. She was on a voyage from Wisbech, Cambridgeshire to Southampton, Hampshire.

== 5 August ==
List of shipwrecks: 5 August 1820
Ship	State	Description
Peace	United Kingdom	The ship was lost at the mouth of the Orinoco. Her crew were rescued.

== 9 August ==
List of shipwrecks: 9 August 1820
Ship	State	Description
Duke	United Kingdom	The ship was sighted in the Baltic Sea off Götaland, Sweden with her cargo having shifted. No further trace, presumed foundered with the loss of all hands. She was on a voyage from Riga, Russia to London.

== 10 August ==
List of shipwrecks: 10 August 1820
Ship	State	Description
New Jersey	United States	The full-rigged ship was driven ashore on South Hampton Beach, Rhode Island. She was on a voyage from Liverpool, Lancashire, United Kingdom to Alexandria, Virginia.

== 12 August ==
List of shipwrecks: 12 August 1820
Ship	State	Description
Samuel	United Kingdom	The ship ran aground on the Mad Wharf Bank. She was on a voyage from Liverpool, Lancashire to London.
Oden	Sweden	The ship capsized at Plymouth, Devon.

== 13 August ==
List of shipwrecks: 13 August 1820
Ship	State	Description
Marcellus	United Kingdom	The ship was wrecked on Sagar Island, Bengal. She was on a voyage from the Netherlands to Bengal.
Neptune	France	The ship was driven ashore near Cape Malabata, Beylik of Tunis, where she was burnt by the local inhabitants. Her crew survived. She was on a voyage from Brest, Finistère to Messina, Sicily.

== 14 August ==
List of shipwrecks: 14 August 1820
Ship	State	Description
Maria	Netherlands	The ship was driven ashore on the coast of East Florida, New Spain. She was on a voyage from Havana, Cuba to Amsterdam, North Holland. Maria was later refloated and put into Nassau, Bahamas for repairs.
Ulysses	United Kingdom	The ship was wrecked at Whithorn, Wigtownshire. She was on a voyage from Whithorn to Gorleston, Suffolk.

== 16 August ==
List of shipwrecks: 16 August 1820
Ship	State	Description
Glatton	United Kingdom	The ship ran aground on the Haaks Bank, in the North Sea off Texel, North Holland, Netherlands and was wrecked. Her crew were rescued. She was on a voyage from Bahia, United Kingdom of Portugal, Brazil and the Algarves to Hamburg.
Janna	Hamburg	The ship was lost near Terschelling, Friesland, Netherlands. All on board were rescued. She was on a voyage from Saint Thomas, Virgin Islands to Hamburg.

== 18 August ==
List of shipwrecks: 18 August 1820
Ship	State	Description
Peterell	United Kingdom	The ship was wrecked on Cabrita Point, Spain. She was on a voyage from Liverpool, Lancashire to Gibraltar.

== 19 August ==
List of shipwrecks: 19 August 1820
Ship	State	Description
Fly	(United Kingdom of Great Britain and Ireland) Jamaica	The ship was wrecked on the Guinea Reef.
Mary Ann	United Kingdom	The ship was wrecked on Cape Gommett, Jamaica. She was on a voyage from Bermuda to Jamaica.
Twey Gesusters	Netherlands	The ship ran aground near Sandhamn, Sweden. She was on a voyage from Danzig to Amsterdam, North Holland.

== 20 August ==
List of shipwrecks: 20 August 1820
Ship	State	Description
Achilles	United Kingdom	The ship was severely damaged in the River Plate at Buenos Aires, Argentina.
Adonia	Argentina	The brig was driven ashore or sank in the River Plate at Buenos Aires.
Anne	United Kingdom	The schooner was driven ashore in the River Plate at Buenos Aires.
Argo	United States	The brig sank in the River Plate at Buenos Aires.
Brilliant	United Kingdom	The ship was wrecked at Ensenada, Buenos Aires.
Dispatch	Argentina	The brig was driven ashore or sank in the River Pate at Buenos Aires.
Hercules	Russia	The full-rigged ship was driven ashore in the River Plate at Buenos Aires.
Johanna	Netherlands	The ship was wrecked on the Dutch coast. She was on a voyage from Königsburg, Prussia to Amsterdam, North Holland.
Navarrois	France	The brig was driven ashore and wrecked in the River Plate at Buenos Aires.
Peru	United Kingdom	The brig ran aground in the River Plate at Buenos Aires. She was refloated on 25 August.
San Juan Nepomacia	Argentina	The polacca was driven ashore or sank in the River Plate at Buenos Aires.
Trafalgar	United Kingdom	The ship was wrecked in the River Plate at Buenos Aires with the loss of two of her crew.

== 21 August ==
List of shipwrecks: 21 August 1820
Ship	State	Description
Providence	United Kingdom	The ship was wrecked on the Kentish Knock, in the North Sea off Margate, Kent. Her crew were rescued. She was on a voyage from Kragerø, Norway to Margate.
Sprightly	United Kingdom	The ship was wrecked on the Sikar Reef, she was on a voyage from Saint Petersburg, Russia to Harrington, Cumberland.

== 22 August ==
List of shipwrecks: 22 August 1820
Ship	State	Description
Escalop	United Kingdom	The schooner capsized off Falmouth, Cornwall. Her crew were rescued. Escalop was later righted and taken in to Falmouth.
Jonge Harm	Netherlands	The ship ran aground near Dunkirk, Nord, France. Her crew were rescued.
Maria Constance	Netherlands	The ship foundered off Caen, Calvados, France. She was on a voyage from Amsterdam, North Holland to Havre de Grâce, Seine-Inférieure, France and the Canary Islands.
William and Mary	United Kingdom	The ship foundered in the North Sea. She was on a voyage from Gothenburg, Sweden to Topsham, Devon.

== 23 August ==
List of shipwrecks: 23 August 1820
Ship	State	Description
Maria Constance	Netherlands	The ship foundered in the English Channel off Caen, Calvados, France. Her crew were rescued. She was on a voyage from Havre de Grâce, Seine-Inférieure, France to the Canary Islands, Spain.
Vrow Elizabeth	Netherlands	The ship was lost off Terschelling, Friesland. She was on a voyage from Königsburg, Prussia to Amsterdam, North Holland.
Vrow Hendrica Jacoba	Netherlands	The ship was lost off Terschelling. She was on a voyage from Danzig to Amsterdam.

== 26 August ==
List of shipwrecks: 26 August 1820
Ship	State	Description
Harmony	United Kingdom	The brig was wrecked on the North Bank, in Liverpool Bay. Her crew were rescued. She was on a voyage from Charlestown, Cornwall to Liverpool, Lancashire.

== 27 August ==
List of shipwrecks: 27 August 1820
Ship	State	Description
Jane	United Kingdom	The ship was driven ashore and wrecked on Barbados.

== 29 August ==
List of shipwrecks: 29 August 1820
Ship	State	Description
Bons Amis	France	The ship was driven ashore at Dungeness, Kent, United Kingdom. She was on a voyage from Morlaix, Finistère to Hamburg. Bons Amis was refloated on 9 September and taken in to Dover, Kent.
Doggerbank	France	The ship was wrecked on the Swedish coast. Her crew were rescued. She was on a voyage from Bordeaux, Gironde to Saint Petersburg, Russia.
Pitt	United Kingdom	The ship was driven ashore and severely damaged on Saint Kitts. She was on a voyage from Nevis to Saint Kitts and London. Pitt was later refloated, but was declared a total loss.

== 30 August ==
List of shipwrecks: 30 August 1820
Ship	State	Description
Sterling	United Kingdom	The ship was driven ashore and wrecked at Beaver Harbour, New Brunswick, British North America. She was on a voyage from Liverpool, Lancashire to New Brunswick.

== 31 August ==
List of shipwrecks: 31 August 1820
Ship	State	Description
Koophandel	Netherlands	The ship was driven ashore on Terschelling, Friesland. She was on a voyage from Saint Petersburg, Russia to Rotterdam, South Holland.
Vrow Alberdina	Netherlands	The ship was lost off Texel, North Holland. She was on a voyage from Saint Petersburg to Rotterdam.

== Unknown date ==
List of shipwrecks: Unknown date in August 1820
Ship	State	Description
China Packet	United States	The ship struck a reef and foundered in the Old Bahama Channel, Bahamas. Her crew were rescued.
Integrity	United Kingdom	The ship was lost near Burin, Newfoundland, British North America. She was on a voyage from Liverpool to Newfoundland.
Mercurius	Prussia	The ship was wrecked off Veere, Zeeland, Netherlands at the end of August. She was on a voyage from Saint-Martin-de-Ré, Charente-Maritime, France to Memel, Prussia.
Theodore	Netherlands	The ship was lost near Riga, Russia. She was on a voyage from Amsterdam, North Holland to Riga.
Vrouw Alberdina	Netherlands	The ship was wrecked off Texel, North Holland. She was on a voyage from Saint Petersburg, Russia to Rotterdam, South Holland.
Vrow Christina	Netherlands	The ship was driven ashore on Skagen, Denmark. She was on a voyage from Königsburg, Prussia to Amsterdam. Vrow Christina was later refloated and put into Arendal, Norway.
