= List of shipwrecks in February 1830 =

The list of shipwrecks in February 1830 includes ships sunk, foundered, grounded, or otherwise lost during February 1830.

== 1 February ==
List of shipwrecks: 1 February 1830
Ship	State	Description
Garland	United Kingdom	The ship was driven ashore near Orford, Suffolk. Her crew were rescued. She was refloated on 10 February.
Scotia	United Kingdom	The ship struck the Hoghshead Rock, in the Irish Sea and sank. She was refloated on 22 February and taken in to Limerick for repairs.

== 2 February ==
List of shipwrecks: 2 February 1830
Ship	State	Description
Carlen	United Kingdom	The ship was wrecked on the Whittaker Sand, in the North Sea. She was on a voyage from South Shields, County Durham to London.

== 3 February ==
List of shipwrecks: 3 February 1830
Ship	State	Description
Commerce	United Kingdom	The ship ran aground on the Nore Sand, in the North Sea.
Scotia	United Kingdom	The ship struck the Hogshead Rock, in the River Shannon and capsized. She was on a voyage from Limerick to Greenock, Renfrewshire.

== 6 February ==
List of shipwrecks: 6 February 1830
Ship	State	Description
Ellen	United Kingdom	The sloop was wrecked at Point of Ayre, Isle of Man with the loss of all hands. She was on a voyage from Killala, County Mayo to Liverpool, Lancashire.
Margaret	United Kingdom	The ship was driven ashore on the Isle of Man. She was on a voyage from Newport, Monmouthshire to Glasgow, Renfrewshire. Margaret was refloated in late February.
Maria	United Kingdom	The ship was wrecked in the English Channel off The Lizard, Cornwall.

== 7 February ==
List of shipwrecks: 7 February 1830
Ship	State	Description
Annabelle	United Kingdom	The ship was driven ashore and wrecked at Greystones, County Wicklow. Her crew were rescued. She was on a voyage from Liverpool, Lancashire to Demerara.
Borodino	United Kingdom	The barque lost both anchors in a gale and was driven on to the Carn Morvel Rock, St Mary's, Isles of Scilly and wrecked. Her crew were rescued. She was on a voyage from Sierra Leone to Milford Haven, Pembrokeshire.
Caledonia	United Kingdom	The ship was driven ashore and wrecked near Saint-Vaast-la-Hougue, Manche, France. She was on a voyage from Bristol, Gloucestershire to Dundee, Forfarshire.
Crown	United Kingdom	The ship was wrecked near the Corsewall Lighthouse. Her crew were rescued. She was on a voyage from Charleston, South Carolina to Greenock, Renfrewshire.
Oak	United Kingdom	The ship foundered in the North Sea off Sea Palling, Norfolk. Her five crew were rescued.
Triton	United Kingdom	The ship sank near Donaghadee, County Down. She was on a voyage from Warrington, Cheshire to Dublin. Triton was later refloated and was taken in to Donaghadee on 21 February.

== 8 February ==
List of shipwrecks: 8 February 1830
Ship	State	Description
Liberty	United Kingdom	The ship struck on the Goodwin Sands, Kent, floated off and sank in deep water. Her crew were rescued. She was on a voyage from Jersey, Channel Islands to South Shields, County Durham or to London.
Pilot	United Kingdom	The brig, from Newcastle-upon-Tyne, was wrecked off the Point of Olives, Royan, Charente-Maritime, France, with the loss of her crew.
Plover	United Kingdom	The ship was driven ashore and wrecked at Ambleteuse, Pas-de-Calais, France. Her crew were rescued. She was on a voyage from Cork to London.

== 9 February ==
List of shipwrecks: 9 February 1830
Ship	State	Description
Elizabeth Gillies	United Kingdom	The ship was driven ashore at Killala, County Mayo. She was on a voyage from Killala to Liverpool, Lancashire.
Paul Pry	United Kingdom	The ship was run down and sunk off Terceira Island, Azores, Portugal.

== 10 February ==
List of shipwrecks: 10 February 1830
Ship	State	Description
Daniel	United Kingdom	The ship was wrecked in the Bonny River, Nigeria.
Spaniel	United Kingdom	The ship was wrecked on the Triangle Rocks, off Saint-Domingue. She was on a voyage from Cap-Haïtien, Haiti to Liverpool, Lancashire.

== 12 February ==
List of shipwrecks: 12 February 1830
Ship	State	Description
Neptunus	Netherlands	The ship ran aground on the Scroby Sands, Norfolk, United Kingdom and sank. She was on a voyage from Salou, Spain to Rotterdam, South Holland.

== 13 February ==
List of shipwrecks: 13 February 1830
Ship	State	Description
Jane	United Kingdom	The brig was driven ashore near Beachy Head, Sussex. She was refloated but was consequently beached west of Beachy Head. Jane was late taken in to Newhaven, Sussex.
Lady Holland	United Kingdom	The ship was wrecked near Saldanha Bay, Cape Colony. All on board were rescued. She was on a voyage from London to Bengal, India.
Superior	United States	The schooner was abandoned in the Atlantic Ocean. Her crew were rescued by Neptune (United Kingdom). Superior was on a voyage from Guadeloupe to Wilmington, Delaware.

== 16 February ==
List of shipwrecks: 16 February 1830
Ship	State	Description
Arlon	United Kingdom	The ship was driven ashore and wrecked at Whitehaven, Cumberland. She was on a voyage from Belfast, County Antrim to Ayr.
Jane	United Kingdom	The sloop was destroyed by an explosion at Penzance, Cornwall. Her former captain was arrested on suspicion of barratry and committed to prison.

== 21 February ==
List of shipwrecks: 21 February 1830
Ship	State	Description
Isabella	United Kingdom	The ship was driven ashore on the Mull of Galloway, Ayrshire. She was on a voyage from Southampton, Hampshire to Greenock, Renfrewshire.
Maria	United Kingdom	The ship collided with a sloop off the Dudgeon Sandbank, in the North Sea off the coast of Norfolk and foundered. Her crew were rescued. The sloop foundered with the loss of all hands.

== 22 February ==
List of shipwrecks: 22 February 1830
Ship	State	Description
Venus	United Kingdom	The ship was driven ashore and wrecked at Robin Hoods Bay, Yorkshire.
Warner	United Kingdom	The brig was driven ashore on the Isle of Arran.

== 23 February ==
List of shipwrecks: 23 February 1830
Ship	State	Description
Ceres	United Kingdom	The sloop collided with Corsair (United Kingdom) in the Irish Sea and foundered with the loss of one of her four crew. She was on a voyage from Liverpool, Lancashire to Newry, County Down.
Good Intent	United Kingdom	The sloop was driven ashore 3 nautical miles (5.6 km) north of Ramsey, Isle of Man. She was on a voyage from Gatehouse of Fleet, Wigtownshire to Glasgow, Renfrewshire.
Hope	United Kingdom	The ship was driven ashore and wrecked at St. Alban's Head, Dorset.
Meteor	United Kingdom	The steamship was wrecked at Portland, Dorset. All on board were rescued. She was on a voyage from Guernsey, Channel Islands to Weymouth, Dorset.
Thomas	United Kingdom	The ship was abandoned in the North Sea off Wells-next-the-Sea, Norfolk.
Young Charles and James	United Kingdom	The sloop ran aground on the Hadston Sands, in the North Sea off Warkworth, Northumberland. She was refloated on 26 February and taken in to Warkworth.

== 24 February ==
List of shipwrecks: 24 February 1830
Ship	State	Description
Diana	France	The ship was driven ashore and wrecked at Blackgang Chine, Isle of Wight, United Kingdom. Her crew were rescued. She was on a voyage from Bordeaux, Gironde to Antwerp, Netherlands.
Helen M^{c}Gregor	United States	Helen M^{c}Gregor. The steamboat exploded and sank at Memphis, Tennessee with the loss of sixteen lives. She was on a voyage from New Orleans, Louisiana to Louisville, Kentucky.
Isabella	United Kingdom	The ship was wrecked at São Miguel, Azores, Portugal with the loss of a crew member. She was on a voyage from Sierra Leone to Plymouth, Devon.
Keith Douglas	United Kingdom	The ship was wrecked on the Black Middens, in the North Sea off Hartlepool, County Durham.
William	United Kingdom	The ship was wrecked at São Miguel. Her crew were rescued.

== 25 February ==
List of shipwrecks: 25 February 1830
Ship	State	Description
Carrier	United Kingdom	The ship was driven ashore and wrecked near Ravenglass, Cumberland. Her crew were rescued.
Cumberland	United Kingdom	The ship was driven ashore near St Bees Head, Cumberland. She was on a voyage from Whitehaven, Cumberland to Jamaica.
Dart	United Kingdom	The ship was wrecked near Baltimore, County Cork. She was on a voyage from Lisbon, Portugal to Glasgow, Renfrewshire.
John	(United Kingdom of Great Britain and Ireland) British North America	The brig was wrecked at Lisbon, Portugal. She was on a voyage from Newfoundland to Lisbon.
Scipio	United Kingdom	The ship was driven ashore and wrecked near St Bees Head.
St. Aubin	United Kingdom	The ship ran upon an anchor at Falmouth, Cornwall. She was refloated but found to be leaking and was consequently beached. St. Aubin was later refloated and repaired.
Tolson	United Kingdom	The ship was wrecked near St Bees Head. Her crew were rescued.

== 28 February ==
List of shipwrecks: 28 February 1830
Ship	State	Description
Euphrates	United Kingdom	The ship was run down and sunk by Eagle in the North Sea off Great Yarmouth, Norfolk.

== Unknown date ==
List of shipwrecks: Unknown date 1830
Ship	State	Description
Ann	(United Kingdom of Great Britain and Ireland) New South Wales	The whaler departed from Sydney. No further trace, presumed foundered with the loss of all hands.
Carron	United Kingdom	The ship was wrecked near Ravenglass, Cumberland.
Diana	flag unknown	The ship was wrecked on the south coast of the Isle of Wight, United Kingdom. She was on a voyage from Bordeaux, Gironde to Antwerp, Netherlands.
Elizabeth	United Kingdom	The ship was driven ashore at Ballina, County Mayo.
Halcyon	(United Kingdom of Great Britain and Ireland) Royal Yacht Club	The cutter was lost in Mediterranean waters.
Hope	United Kingdom	The ship was driven ashore near Ballywalter, County Down.
James	United Kingdom	The ship was driven ashore near Ballywalter.
Moira	United Kingdom	The ship foundered in the English Channel off The Lizard, Cornwall. She was on a voyage from Poole, Dorset to Bristol, Gloucestershire.
Provestenen	Netherlands	The ship was wrecked on the Bunjart Sandbank, in the North Sea in late February.
Waterloo	United Kingdom	The ship capsized at Galway.
