= True Briton (ship) =

Several vessels have been named True Briton:

- True Briton, of 100 tons (bm), was launched at Newbury in 1763. In 1776 her master was T.Babbs, her owner Jn Pitts, and her voyage Teignmouth to St Ubes. In November 1776 the American privateer schooner True Blue, of eight guns, captured True Briton off Lisbon as True Briton was sailing from Newfoundland to the Mediterranean. Her captors took her into Boston.
- True Briton (1775 ship) was launched at Liverpool in 1775. She made two voyages as a slave ship in the triangular trade in enslaved people. During the second of these voyages there was an unsuccessful insurrection by the captives. Then in 1777–1778 she made another enslaving voyage, this time under the name John. On her return to Liverpool, she became the privateer Bellona, and succeeded in taking several prizes. Bellona then made three voyages as a slave ship. In 1786 her ownership changed, and so did her name. She became Lord Stanley, and under that name proceeded to make 11 enslaving voyages. In 1794, at Havana, a deadly fever spread through the vessel, apparently after she had landed her captives. On her last voyage the captain acted with such brutality towards a black crew member that the man, who providentially survived, sued the captain when the vessel arrived at Liverpool and won substantial damages.
- True Briton (1811 ship) was launched at Port Neuf, Quebec. Her primary trade was sailing between Britain and New Brunswick, but she also sailed to Jamaica, and made two voyages to India. Her crew abandoned her in the Atlantic in 1822.
- True Briton (1861 ship) was a Blackwall frigate that carried passengers and cargo to Australia and New Zealand. She ended up as a coal hulk.
- True Briton (1865 ship) was built by Henry Dinning & Co. in Quebec. She stranded on the Marquesas Shoal, Florida Reefs, in January 1889.

== See also ==
- True Briton (East Indiaman) – one of four vessels
- HMS True Briton – the only vessel by that name of the Royal Navy
