= List of shipwrecks in 1829 =

The list of shipwrecks in 1829 includes some ships sunk, wrecked or otherwise lost during 1829.

table of contents
1829
Jan	Feb	Mar	Apr
May	Jun	Jul	Aug
Sep	Oct	Nov	Dec
Unknown date

== Unknown date ==
List of shipwrecks: Unknown date 1829
Ship	State	Description
Aimable	France	The ship was wrecked at Senegal.
Alert	United Kingdom	The ship was lost in the Cayman Islands. Her crew were rescued. She was on a voyage from Jamaica to St. Thomas, Virgin Islands.
Amelia	United Kingdom	The ship was lost off Montevideo, Uruguay.
Bockhay Packet	United Kingdom	The schooner was wrecked at Lourenço Marques, Mozambique.
Brothers	(United Kingdom of Great Britain and Ireland) British North America	The sealer was lost before 6 May.
Carolina	(United Kingdom of Great Britain and Ireland) British North America	The sealer was lost before 6 May.
Charlotte	United Kingdom	The ship was wrecked on the Murr Ledge before 9 May.
Cremongate	United Kingdom	The ship was lost at Bathurst, New Brunswick, British North America.
Cyprus	United Kingdom	Cyprus mutiny: The brig was scuttled off Canton, China, by convicts who had commandeered her.
Dauntless	United Kingdom	The whaler was lost in the Davis Strait.
Elrick	United Kingdom	The ship foundered with the loss of all hands. She was on a voyage from Funen, Denmark to London.
Envy	(United Kingdom of Great Britain and Ireland) British North America	The sealer was lost before 6 May.
Éolé or Iolé	France	The ship was wrecked on the coast of Kaffraria with the loss of eleven or twelve of the twenty people on board. She was on a voyage from Île Bourbon to Bordeaux, Gironde.
Experiment	(United Kingdom of Great Britain and Ireland) British North America	The sealer was lost before 6 May.
Fanny	(United Kingdom of Great Britain and Ireland) British North America	The sealer was lost before 6 May.
Favourite	(United Kingdom of Great Britain and Ireland) British North America	The sealer was lost before 6 May.
George	(United Kingdom of Great Britain and Ireland) Isle of Man	The ship was lost in January or February.
George Canning	United Kingdom	The ship was lost at Newfoundland, British North America. There were no casualties amongst her crew.
Gordon Castle	United Kingdom	The ship was lost at Bathurst.
Governor Philip	(United Kingdom of Great Britain and Ireland) New South Wales	The brig was lost off the coast of New South Wales.
Granicus	United Kingdom	The ship was wrecked in the Magdalen Islands, Lower Canada, British North America. She was on a voyage from Quebec City, Lower Canada to Cork.
Grecian	United Kingdom	The ship was lost on the Triangles Reef before 3 July. She was on a voyage from British Honduras to Campeche, Mexico.
Highland Laddie	(United Kingdom of Great Britain and Ireland) British North America	The sealer was lost before 6 May.
Home Castle	United Kingdom	The whaler was wrecked on the coast of the Davis Strait. Her crew were rescued by Lady Jane (United Kingdom).
Industry	(United Kingdom of Great Britain and Ireland) British North America	The sealer was lost before 6 May.
Jane	United Kingdom	The whaler was lost in the Davis Strait. There were no casualties amongst her crew.
Jean	United Kingdom	The ship was lost at Bahamas. There were no casualties amongst her crew.
Lady Nancy	(United Kingdom of Great Britain and Ireland) British North America	The sealer was lost before 6 May.
Magner	United Kingdom	The ship foundered in Lyme Bay.
Maria Louisa	(United Kingdom of Great Britain and Ireland) British North America	The ship was wrecked on the coast of Labrador. Her crew were rescued.
Mariner	United Kingdom	The ship was wrecked off Cape Canso, Nova Scotia, British North America. She was on a voyage from Saint Vincent to Quebec City, Lower Canada, British North America.
Mary	United Kingdom	The ship was lost at Bathurst.
Middlesex	United Kingdom	The ship was lost on the coast of Newfoundland, British North America. Her crew survived. She was on a voyage from London to Quebec City, Lower Canada.
Nancy	(United Kingdom of Great Britain and Ireland) British North America	The sealer was lost before 6 May.
Rockwood	United Kingdom	The whaler was lost in the Davis Strait.
Sally	(United Kingdom of Great Britain and Ireland) British North America	The sealer was lost before 6 May.
Tohora	(United Kingdom of Great Britain and Ireland) New Zealand	The whaler and trader Tohora ran aground during a heavy gale at Otaikokako, Taranaki, New Zealand. The ship was refloated, having sustained some damage but still seaworthy. As she was being loaded with cargo the following day, a heavy cask fell into the hold and smashed through a weakened part of the bottom.
Visitor	(United Kingdom of Great Britain and Ireland) British North America	The sealer was lost before 6 May.
Waterloo	United Kingdom	The ship was wrecked at Little River, Bay of Fundy, British North America.
