= List of shipwrecks in June 1839 =

The list of shipwrecks in June 1839 includes ships sunk, foundered, wrecked, grounded, or otherwise lost during June 1839.

== 1 June ==
List of shipwrecks: 1 June 1839
Ship	State	Description
Huron	United States	The ship ran aground at New Orleans, Louisiana.
Runswick	United Kingdom	The ship was driven ashore near "Allskagen", Denmark. She was on a voyage from Hull, Yorkshire to Riga, Russia. She was later refloated and resumed her voyage.
Sydney	United Kingdom	The ship ran aground at New Orleans.

== 2 June ==
List of shipwrecks: 2 June 1839
Ship	State	Description
Britain	United Kingdom	The ship foundered off the coast of Pembrokeshire. Her crew were rescued.
Ellen	United Kingdom	The ship was driven ashore at Red Wharf Bay, Anglesey. She was on a voyage from Strangford, County Down to Liverpool, Lancashire.

== 3 June ==
List of shipwrecks: 3 June 1839
Ship	State	Description
Union	United Kingdom	The ship was driven ashore at Redcar, Yorkshire. She was later refloated.

== 5 June ==
List of shipwrecks: 5 June 1839
Ship	State	Description
Aurora	Sweden	The ship ran aground and was damaged in Gullman Fjorden. She was on a voyage from "Saltkallaw" to Havre de Grâce, Seine-Inférieure, France.
Lapwing	(United Kingdom of Great Britain and Ireland) Tobago	The ship was driven ashore and wrecked on the west coast of Tobago.
Paget	United Kingdom	The ship was driven ashore and wrecked on the west coast of Tobago. She was on a voyage from Newfoundland, British North America to Barbados.
Venus	United Kingdom	The ship was driven ashore near Roquetas de Mar, Spain. She was on a voyage from Messina, Sicily to Liverpool, Lancashire. Venus was later refloated and resumed her voyage.

== 6 June ==
List of shipwrecks: 6 June 1839
Ship	State	Description
Harmina	Kingdom of Hanover	The ship was driven ashore on Baltrum. She was on a voyage from Leer to Stettin.
Onandango	United Kingdom	The ship was driven ashore in the Saint Lawrence River. She was on a voyage from Cork to Quebec city, Lower Canada, British North America.

== 7 June ==
List of shipwrecks: 7 June 1839
Ship	State	Description
Maid of Claro	United Kingdom	The ship paddle tug foundered off Lowestoft, Suffolk. Her crew survived.
Medora	United Kingdom	The ship was wrecked on the Sligo Reefs, off Jamaica. Her crew were rescued. She was on a voyage from Cork to Jamaica.

== 8 June ==
List of shipwrecks: 8 June 1839
Ship	State	Description
Sarah	(United Kingdom of Great Britain and Ireland) New South Wales	The cutter capsized off Sydney. All nine people on board were rescued by the whaler Nathaniel Tallmidge(United States). Sarah was on a voyage from Sydney to Wollongong.
Siam	United Kingdom	The ship was wrecked 15 nautical miles (28 km) east of Java Head, Java, Netherlands East Indies. Her crew were rescued. She was on a voyage from London to Singapore and Manila, Spanish East Indies.

== 9 June ==
List of shipwrecks: 10 June 1839
Ship	State	Description
Dublin Packet	(United Kingdom of Great Britain and Ireland) New South Wales	The whaler, a schooner, was wrecked at Taieri Island, New Zealand with the loss of three lives.

== 10 June ==
List of shipwrecks: 10 June 1839
Ship	State	Description
Sarah	United Kingdom	The ship was wrecked at Payta, Peru.

== 11 June ==
List of shipwrecks: 11 June 1839
Ship	State	Description
Bruderliebe	Bremen	The ship was in collision with Niord (Denmark) in the Kattegat and was abandoned with the loss of a crew member. Survivors were rescued by Niord. Bruderliebe was on a voyage from Riga, Russia to Bremen. She came ashore near Varberg, Sweden and was wrecked.
Francis Freeling	(United Kingdom of Great Britain and Ireland) New South Wales	The ship ran aground and capsized off Port Stephens and was wrecked. All 40 passengers were rescued by HMS Beagle (Royal Navy). Francis Freeling was on a voyage from Sydney to Port Phillip.
Hero	United Kingdom	The ship departed from Table Bay for Algoa Bay. No further trace, presumed foundered with the loss of all hands.
Jane	United Kingdom	The ship was wrecked in the Dry Tortugas. Her crew were rescued. She was on a voyage from Newport, Monmouthshire to Havana, Cuba.

== 12 June ==
List of shipwrecks: 12 June 1839
Ship	State	Description
Emperor	United Kingdom	The ship was wrecked at "Tarbau", Africa. Her crew were rescued.
Atlantic	United States	The whaling ship was wrecked off Akaroa, New Zealand, driven onto rocks by a gale. Her crew were rescued.
Gironde	France	The steamship was struck a rock off Ouessant, Finistère and was severely damaged. She was on a voyage from an English port to Brest, Finistère. Gironde was refloated and taken into "Legoudon".
Gode Hensight	Stettin	The ship foundered between "Trindel" and "Winga". Her crew were rescued. She was on a voyage from Stettin to Rouen, Seine-Inférieure, France.
Leonhard	Rostock	The ship was driven ashore at Thisted, Denmark. Her crew were rescued. She was on a voyage from Jersey, Channel Islands to Rostock. Leonhard was refloated on 26 August and taken into Aalborg.

== 13 June ==
List of shipwrecks: 13 June 1839
Ship	State	Description
Anne	United Kingdom	The ship struck the Sheringham Shoals, in the North Sea off the coast of Norfolk. She was beached near Cley-next-the-Sea, where she became a wreck. Her crew were rescjed. Anne was on a voyage from South Shields, County Durham to London.
Comet	United Kingdom	The ship was driven ashore and wrecked near Cley-next-the-Sea. Her crew were rescued. She was on a voyage from Sunderland, County Durham to London.

== 14 June ==
List of shipwrecks: 14 June 1839
Ship	State	Description
Flora	United Kingdom	The ship ran aground at Liverpool, Lancashire. She was on a voyage from Liverpool to Quebec City, Lower Canada, British North America.
Mary Ann	United Kingdom	The ship ran aground off Saugor, India. She was refloated and out back to Calcutta for repairs.
Vigilentia	Netherlands	The ship was driven ashore on Terschelling, Friesland. She was on a voyage from Pillau, Prussia to Amsterdam, North Holland. Vigilentia was later refloated.

== 15 June ==
List of shipwrecks: 15 June 1839
Ship	State	Description
Bonne Mere	United Kingdom	The ship was driven ashore in British Honduras.
Emanuel	Sweden	The ship ran aground on the Sunk Sand, in the North Sea off the coast of Essex, United Kingdom. Her crew were rescued by the smack Lord Howe (United Kingdom), which lost three of her crew during the rescue. Emanuel was on a voyage from Gothenburg to London, United Kingdom.
Joseph Hume	United Kingdom	The ship was driven ashore in British Honduras.

== 16 June ==
List of shipwrecks: 16 June 1839
Ship	State	Description
Maidstone	United Kingdom	The ship ran aground in the Agger Channel. She was on a voyage from Rochester, Kent to Saint Petersburg, Russia. She was later refloated.
Victoria	United Kingdom	The schooner ran aground on the Corton Sand, in the North Sea off the coast of Suffolk. She was on a voyage from Hamburg to London. Victoria was later refloated and taken into Lowestoft, Suffolk.

== 17 June ==
List of shipwrecks: 17 June 1839
Ship	State	Description
Cane Grove	United Kingdom	The ship was struck rocks at Duncansby Head, Caithness and was severely damaged. She was on a voyage from Memel, Prussia to Galway. Cane Grove was refloated and taken into Stromness, Orkney Islands.
Hope	United Kingdom	The ship was driven ashore at Teignmouth, Devon. She was on a voyage from Teignmouth to Bristol, Gloucestershire.
Vulture	United Kingdom	The steamship ran aground on the Shipwash Sand, in the North Sea off the coast of Suffolk, She was on a voyage from London to Saint Petersburg, Russia. Vulcan was later refloated and resumed her voyage.

== 18 June ==
List of shipwrecks: 18 June 1839
Ship	State	Description
Ann and Mary	United Kingdom	The whaling brig was wrecked at Whangaroa Harbour (Port Hutt), Chatham Island, New Zealand. Her crew were rescued. She was on a voyage from Sydney, New South Wales to New Zealand.
Felicité	France	The ship was wrecked between Hjørring and Thisted, Denmark. She was on a voyage from Bordeaux, Gironde to Saint Petersburg, Russia.

== 19 June ==
List of shipwrecks: 19 June 1839
Ship	State	Description
Active	United Kingdom	The ship ran aground on the Cork Sand, in the North Sea off Felixtowe, Suffolk. She was on a voyage from Liverpool, Lancashire to Ipswich, Suffolk. Active was later refloated.
Delta	United States	The ship was wrecked on Torbay Point, Newfoundland, British North America. Her crew were rescued. She was on a voyage from New York to Miramichi, New Brunswick, British North America.
Lucretia	United Kingdom	The ship was destroyed by fire at Sydney, New South Wales. An attempt by HMS Pelorus (Royal Navy) to scuttle her was unsuccessful. She was on a voyage from Sydney to India.

== 20 June ==
List of shipwrecks: 20 June 1839
Ship	State	Description
Cacique	Belgium	The ship ran aground on the Noord Rassen Bank, in the North Sea. She was on a voyage from Saint Domingo to Antwerp. Cacique was refloated and put into Vlissingen, Zeeland, Netherlands.
Somerset	United Kingdom	The schooner foundered in the Bristol Channel off Steep Holm, Somerset with the loss of all eight people on board. She was on a voyage from Newport, Monmouthshire to Bridgwater, Somerset.

== 21 June ==
List of shipwrecks: 21 June 1839
Ship	State	Description
Aigle	France	The ship was driven ashore at Deal, Kent, United Kingdom. She was on a voyage from Caen, Calvados to Sandwich, Kent. Aigle was refloated and resumed her voyage.
Fame	United Kingdom	The ship ran aground at King's Lynn, Norfolk. She was on a voyage from Seaham, County Durham to King's Lynn. Fame was later refloated and taken into King's Lynn.
Four Brothers	United Kingdom	The ship was holed by an anchor at Rye, Sussex. She was on a voyage from Rye to Leith, Lothian.

== 22 June ==
List of shipwrecks: 22 June 1839
Ship	State	Description
Argyra	United Kingdom	The ship ran aground off Therasia, Greece. She was on a voyage from Smyrna, Ottoman Empire to Plymouth, Devon.
Lark	United Kingdom	The ship struck rocks near Scarborough, Yorkshire and was damaged. She was on a voyage from King's Lynn, Norfolk to Stockton-on-Tees, County Durham. Lark was refloated and taken into Scarborough.
Les Enfants Cheris	France	The lugger was wrecked on the Nash Sands, in the Bristol Channel. Her six crew were rescued. She was on a voyage from Nantes, Loire-Inférieure to Bristol, Gloucestershire, United Kingdom.
Prince Regent	United Kingdom	The ship was driven ashore in Tramore Bay. All 40 passengers and crew were rescued. She was on a voyage from Newport, Monmouthshire to New York, United States.

== 23 June ==
List of shipwrecks: 23 June 1839
Ship	State	Description
Dorothy	United Kingdom	The ship was driven ashore in the Magdalen Islands, Lower Canada, British North America. She was on a voyage from Quebec City, Lower Canada to Bristol, Gloucestershire. Dorothy was later refloated and resumed her voyage.
Orleans	United Kingdom	The brigantine was driven ashore and wrecked near Cork. She was on a voyage from Cork to Arkhangelsk, Russia.

== 24 June ==
List of shipwrecks: 24 June 1839
Ship	State	Description
Mary	United Kingdom	The ship was driven ashore on Lundy Island, Devon. She was on a voyage from Liverpool, Lancashire to Rotterdam, South Holland, Netherlands. Mary was refloated and taken into Ilfracombe, Devon.

== 25 June ==
List of shipwrecks: 25 June 1839
Ship	State	Description
Mary	United Kingdom	The ship ran aground at Shoreham-by-Sea, Sussex. She was on a voyage from Swansea, Glamorgan to Shoreham by Sea.

== 26 June ==
List of shipwrecks: 26 June 1839
Ship	State	Description
Annie	United Kingdom	The ship was wrecked near Aden. Her crew were rescued. She was on a voyage from Llanelly, Glamorgan to Manila, Spanish East Indies.
Lafayette	France	The ship ran aground on the Middleton Ledge, in the English Channel off the coast of Sussex, United Kingdom. She was on a voyage from Cette, Hérault to Bremen. She was refloated.
Rolla	France	The ship was wrecked near Val-Salé, Eure. Her crew were rescued.

== 27 June ==
List of shipwrecks: 27 June 1839
Ship	State	Description
Zorgvlith	Netherlands	The ship ran aground at Tønningen, Duchy of Holstein. She was on a voyage from Amsterdam, North Holland to Königsberg, Prussia.

== 28 June ==
List of shipwrecks: 28 June 1839
Ship	State	Description
Ealing Grove	United Kingdom	The ship ran aground south of Dominica. All on board were rescued. She was on a voyage from Dominica to London. Ealing Grove was refloated on 3 July and put back to Dominica. She was subsequently condemned.
Henry	United Kingdom	The ship capsized and sank in the English Channel with the loss of two of her crew. She was on a voyage from London to Guernsey, Channel Islands.

== 29 June ==
List of shipwrecks: 29 June 1839
Ship	State	Description
Lady Ridley	United Kingdom	The ship was driven ashore at Whitby, Yorkshire.
Nymph	United Kingdom	The ship was driven ashore at Teignmouth, Devon. She was on a voyage from Newport, Monmouthshire to Teignmouth. Nymph was later refloated and taken into Teignmouth.
Sarah	United Kingdom	The ship was driven ashore at Whitby.

== 30 June ==
List of shipwrecks: 30 June 1839
Ship	State	Description
Nelson	United Kingdom	The ship sprang a leak was abandoned in the Atlantic Ocean. Her crew were rescued. She was on a voyage from Newcastle upon Tyne, Northumberland to New York, United States.

== Unknown date ==
List of shipwrecks: unknown date in June 1839
Ship	State	Description
Alcyon	United Kingdom	The ship was wrecked at Mazagan, Morocco.
Anaxibia	United Kingdom	The ship was wrecked at Saint Domingo. She was on a voyage from Saint Domingo to Liverpool, Lancashire.
Diane	Belgium	The ship was driven ashore on Schouwen, Zeeland, Netherlands and was damaged. She was on a voyage from Riga, Russia to Antwerp. Diane was later refloated; she arrived at Antwerp on 18 June.
Elizabeth	United Kingdom	The ship was wrecked in the Hooghly River before 18 June. Her crew were rescued.
Hope	United Kingdom	The ship ran aground on the Spratt Sands. She was on a voyage from Teignmouth, Devon to Bristol, Gloucestershire. Hope was later refloated.
Laura Secunda	Brazil	The ship was seized by her slave crew, who murdered the rest of the crew and ran the ship ashore at Ceará. She was on a voyage from Maranhão to Pernambuco.
Onondaga	United Kingdom	The ship was driven ashore on "Bessamitis". She was on a voyage from Cork to Quebec City, Lower Canada, British North America. She was refloated and resumed her voyage.
Prince Regent	United Kingdom	The ship was on her way from Newport to New York with a cargo of rod iron, when she stranded in Tramore Bay. Her passengers and crew were landed safely.
Princess Victoria	Hamburg	The steamship ran aground in the Elbe and was damaged. She was on a voyage from Antwerp, Belgium to Hamburg. She was refloated and completed her voyage, but was consequently put under repair.
