= List of shipwrecks in August 1822 =

The list of shipwrecks in August 1822 includes some ships sunk, foundered, grounded, or otherwise lost during August 1822.

== 1 August ==
List of shipwrecks: 1 August 1822
Ship	State	Description
Venus	United Kingdom	The ship foundered in the Bristol Channel off Lundy Island, Devon. Her crew were rescued. She was on a voyage from Cardiff, Glamorgan to Hayle, Cornwall.

== 3 August ==
List of shipwrecks: 3 August 1822
Ship	State	Description
Warden	United Kingdom	The ship ran onto rocks and sank at Tynemouth, Northumberland. Her crew were rescued.

== 5 August ==
List of shipwrecks: 5 August 1822
Ship	State	Description
Hero	United Kingdom	The whaler was lost in the Davis Straits. Her crew were rescued.

== 11 August ==
List of shipwrecks: 11 August 1822
Ship	State	Description
Perth	United Kingdom	The ship sprang a leak and was abandoned in the North Sea. Her crew were rescued. Perth was on a voyage from Sunderland, County Durham to Aberdeen.

== 12 August ==
List of shipwrecks: 12 August 1822
Ship	State	Description
Betsey	(United Kingdom of Great Britain and Ireland) New South Wales	The ship was wrecked in Broken Bay. Her crew were rescued.

== 15 August ==
List of shipwrecks: 15 August 1822
Ship	State	Description
Britannia	United Kingdom	The ship was wrecked at Solva, Pembrokeshire. She was on a voyage from Little Haven to Solva.

== 16 August ==
List of shipwrecks: 16 August 1822
Ship	State	Description
Comet	United States	The ship was wrecked on Amburger Key. She was on a voyage from British Honduras to Portland, Maine.
Palmyra	Puerto Rican pirates	The brig was captured and sunk off St. Thomas, Virgin Islands by USS Grampus (United States Navy) with the loss of eleven of her 88 crew.
Pancheta	Spain	The privateer, a brig was severely damaged St. Thomas, Virgin Islands in an engagement with USS Grampus (United States Navy). She was taken in to St. Thomas.

== 17 August ==
List of shipwrecks: 17 August 1822
Ship	State	Description
Venus	United Kingdom	The ship was wrecked on The Holmes, in the Bristol Channel. Her crew were rescued.

== 18 August ==
List of shipwrecks: 18 August 1822
Ship	State	Description
Hopewell	United Kingdom	The ship was driven ashore at Richibucto, New Brunswick, British North America.

== 18 August ==
List of shipwrecks: 18 August 1822
Ship	State	Description
Anna Dorothea		The ship, of Kiel, was on her way from St Ubes when she started to sink. George Hibbert United Kingdom took off the crew and brought them into the Downs.

== 20 August ==
List of shipwrecks: 20 August 1822
Ship	State	Description
Jonathan	United Kingdom	The ship sprang a leak and was beached at Calcutta, India.

== 21 August ==
List of shipwrecks: 21 August 1822
Ship	State	Description
Martha Brae	United Kingdom	The ship was lost on Cape Sable Island, Nova Scotia, British North America. Her crew were rescued. She was on a voyage from Bristol, Gloucestershire to New Brunswick, British North America.

== 23 August ==
List of shipwrecks: 23 August 1822
Ship	State	Description
Edward	United Kingdom	The ship was wrecked at Kirktown Head, Aberdeenshire. Her crew were rescued. She was on a voyage from Virginia, United States to Leith, Lothian.

== 24 August ==
List of shipwrecks: 24 August 1822
Ship	State	Description
Lark	United Kingdom	The ship sprang a leak and was beached. She was on a voyage from Dundalk, County Louth to Liverpool, Lancashire.
Victorine	(United Kingdom of Great Britain and Ireland) New South Wales	The schooner departed from Sydney for Mauritius. No further trace, presumed foundered in the Pacific Ocean with the loss of all seven or eight crew.

== 25 August ==
List of shipwrecks: 25 August 1822
Ship	State	Description
Monitor	United States	The ship was wrecked at Barbuda. She was on a voyage from Philadelphia, Pennsylvania to Sint Eustatius.
Retrieve	United Kingdom	The ship ran aground on the St. Anna Shoal. She was on a voyage from London to Maranhão, Brazil. Retrieve was later refloated but was condemned.
True Briton	United Kingdom	The ship was abandoned in the Atlantic Ocean. Her crew were rescued by Hebe (United Kingdom) She was on a voyage from Liverpool, Lancashire to Saint John, New Brunswick, British North America.

== 26 August ==
List of shipwrecks: 26 August 1822
Ship	State	Description
Nueva Pelicana	Spain	The schooner was driven ashore and wrecked at Kingston, Jamaica by a privateer.

== 28 August ==
List of shipwrecks: 28 August 1822
Ship	State	Description
Neptune	United Kingdom	The ship foundered in the Bristol Channel off Swansea, Glamorgan with the loss of two of her crew. She was on a voyage from Neath, Glamorgan to Cardigan.

== 29 August ==
List of shipwrecks: 29 August 1822
Ship	State	Description
Cepheus	United Kingdom	The brig was driven ashore and wrecked between Dungeness, Kent and Camber, Sussex. Her crew were rescued.

== 30 August ==
List of shipwrecks: 30 August 1822
Ship	State	Description
Asia Feliz	India	The ship was driven ashore and wrecked at Mazagon.
Eliza	United Kingdom	The ship was driven ashore and wrecked om Butcher's Island, Bombay, India.

== 31 August ==
List of shipwrecks: 31 August 1822
Ship	State	Description
Alexander	United States	The ship was driven ashore and severely damaged in the River Plate near Point Indigo, Argentina. She was later refloated and put into Ensenada.

== Unknown date ==
List of shipwrecks: Unknown date in August 1822
Ship	State	Description
David Shaw	United Kingdom	The ship was abandoned in the Atlantic Ocean before 22 August. She was on a voyage from Quebec City, Lower Canada, British North America to Belfast, County Antrim. She was towed into Crookhaven, County Cork on 25 September by HMRC Kite ( Board of Customs).
Eleanor	United Kingdom	The ship sank in the River Liffey. She was later refloated and taken in to Dublin.
Friendship	United Kingdom	The ship foundered off Rame Head, Cornwall. Her crew were rescued.
Hazard	United Kingdom	The ship foundered in the North Sea. Her crew were rescued by a Dutch galiot. She was on a voyage from Stockton-on-Tees, Yorkshire to Rouen, Seine-Inférieure, France.
Katherine	United Kingdom	The sloop was lost in the Hebrides with the loss of at least 13 lives.
Victorine	(United Kingdom of Great Britain and Ireland) New South Wales	The ship departed from Sydney for Hobart, Van Diemen's Land. No further trace, presumed foundered with the loss of all hands.
