= Equity (1811 ship) =

UK merchant ship 1811–1813

History

United States
- Builder: Marblehead, Massachusetts
- Launched: 1807

United Kingdom
- Name: Equity
- Acquired: 1811 by purchase
- Fate: Captured and burnt 8 December 1813

General characteristics
- Tons burthen: 85, or 88 (bm)
- Sail plan: Schooner
- Complement: 8

Equity was launched at Marblehead, Massachusetts in 1807, possibly under another name. She entered British registry in 1811. In 1813 an American letter of marque captured her, but the Royal Navy recaptured her. Then at the end of 1813 an American privateer captured and burnt her.

== Career ==
Equity first appeared in Lloyd's Register (LR) with M.Till, master, D.Field, owner, and trade Plymouth–Swansea.

The American letter of marque Price captured Equity, Irwin, master, on 3 April 1813. HMS Iris recaptured Equity on 13 April, the day after she captured Price. Iris sent Equity into Corunna. Equity, of eight men and 88 tons, was carrying wine from Madeira to London.

Lloyd's Register for 1813 showed Equity with Irwin, master, changing to Shaw, J.Field, owner, and trade Plymouth–Madeira. The Register of Shipping (RS) showed her with the same change of master and the same owner as in Lloyd's Register, but showed her with a change of trade, from Plymouth–Wales to London–Limerick. It also showed her as having undergone small repairs in 1812, and having damages repaired in 1813.

== Fate ==
The American privateer Rattlesnake captured Equity, Shaw, master, on 8 December 1813, in the Atlantic Ocean at (51°30′N 11°20′W). Equity was on a voyage from London to Limerick. Rattlesnake set fire to Equity, which sank.
