= Prince Regent (1811 Howdon Pans ship) =

UK merchant ship (1811–1836)

History

United Kingdom
- Name: Prince Regent
- Namesake: The Prince Regent
- Launched: 1817, Francis Hurry & Co., Howdon Pans (Note: Prince Regent was the last vessel that the firm of Francis Hurry & Co. (1763–1811) built. The firm had gone into bankruptcy in 1806, Francis Hurry died in 1808, and the firm ceased building ships in 1811.)
- Fate: Wrecked 31 October 1836

General characteristics
- Tons burthen: 394, or 403, or 404 (bm)
- Armament: 8 × 6-pounder guns

Prince Regent was launched at Howdon Pans in 1811, the last vessel that the shipbuilding firm of Francis Hurry & Co. built. She spent almost all her career as a West Indiaman. New owners circa 1834 started trading with the Baltic. She was wrecked on 31 October 1836, forcing her crew to abandon her.

== Career ==
Prince Regent first appeared in Lloyd's Register (LR) in 1812.

She was registered in Liverpool in 1818

Year	Master	Owner	Trade	Source & notes
1812	Taylor	Hurry & Co. J.How (or Hawes) & Co	London–Tobago	LR
1820	Taylor	How & Co	London–Tobago	LR; some repairs 1817 & large repair 1819
1825	Taylor	How & Co	London–Tobago	LR; large repair 1819, wales and some repairs 1824
1830	G.Taylor	How & Co	London–Tobago	LR; large repair 1819, wales and some repairs 1824
1834	J.S. Collyer		London	
1835	J.S. Collyer; E.Lane	Lane & Co.	London	LR; some repairs 1835
1836	E.Lane	Lane & Co.	London	LR; some repairs 1835 & 1836

== Fate ==
On 31 October 1836, Prince Regent, Lane, master, was wrecked on her way back from Riga to London. Her crew abandoned her as she had nine feet of water in her hold. She had been driven ashore at "Wettsa", Russia.

Her entry in the volume of Lloyd's Register for 1836 carried the annotation "Abandoned".
