= Price (1811 ship) =

History

United States
- Name: Price
- Owner: John Hollins, John Smith Hollins, Michael McBlair
- Builder: Baltimore
- Launched: 1811
- Commissioned: 4 February 1813
- Captured: 14 February 1813

United Kingdom
- Name: Price
- Acquired: 1813 by purchase of a prize
- Fate: Last listed 1820

General characteristics
- Tons burthen: 235, or 253 (bm)
- Sail plan: Schooner
- Complement: 35
- Armament: American: 6 guns; British: 2 × 9 & 2 × 12-pounder guns

Price was launched in 1811 and commissioned at New York in 1813. HMS Iris captured her shortly thereafter. She then became the British merchantman Price. She was last listed in 1820.

== Career ==
Captain Enoch Staples commissioned Price on 4 February 1813. HMS Iris captured her on 12/13 April after a chase of 13 hours. Price had a crew of 30, five of her crew presumably forming the prize crew on Equity. Price, Stoffield, master, had been sailing from Charleston to France. She arrived at Plymouth on 6 April.

Iris also captured the schooner Equity, of Plymouth, Irwin, master, on 3 April. Price had captured Equity, Irwin, master, on 3 April. Iris recaptured Equity the day after she had captured Price. Iris sent Equity into Corunna. Equity, of eight men and 88 tons, was carrying wine from Madeira to London.

Price first appeared in Lloyd's Register (LR) in 1813 with Nepier, master, and trade Plymouth–London. The Register of Shipping (RS) for 1813 showed Price with F.Jones, master and owner, and trade Plymouth–London.

Price was last listed in Lloyd's Register in 1818, and in the Register of Shipping in 1820, in both cases with information unchanged from her first appearances.
