= Queen Elizabeth (1811 ship) =

History

United Kingdom
- Name: Queen Elizabeth
- Namesake: Elizabeth I of England
- Builder: Pownal Bay, Prince Edward Island
- Launched: 1811
- Fate: Last listed 1831

General characteristics
- Tons burthen: 17290/94, or 195, or 19551/94, or 198 (bm)
- Armament: 2 × 9-pounder carronades

Queen Elizabeth was launched in 1811 at Pownall Bay, Prince Edward Island. She sailed to England and transferred her registry to the Port of Exeter on 20 April 1812. She then traded between England and Canada, was a transport, and traded between London and the Cape of Good Hope.

Queen Elizabeth first appeared in Lloyd's Register (LR) in 1812.

She arrived at Plymouth on 11 October 1812 with a cargo of timber from Prince Edward Island. (Note: She reported that the fort there (probably Fort Amherst), had been repaired and that its garrison consisted of part of the New Brunswick corps (probably the 104th (New Brunswick) Regiment), and a company of the Royal Artillery.)

Year	Master	Owner	Trade	Source & notes
1812	Hollett; Chandler	Hollett	Cowes–Portsmouth	LR
1814	Hurdle	Welsford	Plymouth transport	LR
1820	S.Amm	Welsford	London–New Brunswick	LR; damages repaired 1815
1825	G.Griffin	Welsford	London–New Brunswick	LR; damages repaired 1815
1831	Griffin	Welsford	London–CGH	LR; damages repaired 1825
