= Rachel (1811 ship) =

UK merchant ship 1811–1813

History

United Kingdom
- Name: Rachel
- Builder: Parish of Terrebonne, Quebec
- Launched: 1811
- Fate: Condemned February 1813

General characteristics
- Tons burthen: 194, or 195 (bm)
- Sail plan: Brig
- Armament: 8 × 9-pounder carronades

Rachel was launched in the Parish of Terrebonne, Quebec, in 1811. She was condemned in 1813 as irreparably damaged.

== Overview ==
She first appeared in Lloyd's Register (LR) in 1812.

Year	Master	Owner	Trade	Source
1812	P.Morin	M'Kenzie	London–Quebec	LR

On 6 August 1812, Rachel. Morin. master, arrived at Liverpool from Quebec. This was at least her second voyage between England and Quebec. On 20 September she sailed from Loch Ryan for Quebec.

== Loss ==
On 24 January 1813 Rachel, Morin, master, was sailing from Newfoundland to Barbados when she encountered a gale at 41°34′N 46°52′W that dismasted her and reduced her to a complete wreck. The prevailing winds were from South to West so the crew made for the Western Islands. They arrived on 11 February at Augra on Terceira Island. There it proved impossible to find the stores required to refit her so she was condemned. The entry for her in the 1814 Lloyd's Register carried the annotation "condemned".
