= Vittoria (1813 ship) =

1813 British owned schooner

History

United Kingdom
- Launched: 1811, Baltimore
- Acquired: 1813 by purchase of a prize
- Renamed: Vittoria (1813)
- Fate: Lost 1814

General characteristics
- Tons burthen: 258, (Note: The name in the referenced list of British letters of marque was mis-transcribed as Victoria.) or 276 (bm)
- Sail plan: Schooner, or brig
- Complement: 36
- Armament: 9 × 12-pounder guns

Vittoria was a schooner launched at Baltimore in 1811 under another name. British owners acquired her in 1813, probably as a prize, and renamed her. She became a privateer sailing out of Guernsey and captured at least three vessels trading between the United States and France. She disappeared from online records circa 1814, though she remains listed to 1818 with data unchanged from 1813. A French privateer may have captured her in 1814.

== Origins ==
It would require original archival research to determine Vittoria's origins. Two sources state that she was the American warship USS Argus, which HMS Pelican captured on 14 August 1813, but that is highly improbable. Argus, of 299 tons (bm), was launched in 1802 at Boston; Vittoria, of 258–276 tons (bm), was launched in Baltimore in 1811. Vittoria first appeared in Lloyd's List's ship arrival and departure data as arriving in Guernsey on 19 August 1813, and Pelican had captured Argus on 14 August.

There were American letters of marque named Argus. One, from Newburyport, Massachusetts, was a schooner of 275 tons (bm), but there is nothing beyond her name and size that would suggest that she might have become Vittoria. There is no report in either the London Gazette or Lloyd's List of a capture of an Argus in 1813 that might have become Vittoria.

== Career ==
Vittoria first appeared in Lloyd's Register (LR) in 1813. She entered the Guernsey Registry in 1813 too.

Year	Master	Owner	Trade	Source
1813	de Putron	de Lisle	London–Guernsey	LR

"Victory", de Putron, master, arrived in Guernsey on 19 August 1813. Vittoria, David de Putron, master, received a protection on 30 September. Captain William de Putron acquired a letter of marque on 29 September. Thereafter, the Guernsey privateer Vittoria captured several French vessels that she sent into Guernsey.

- Vrou Lounels, Holden, master, from Lorient to New York
- Volunteer, Inoff, master, from Nantes to America
- Pilot, Straford, master, from Savannah to Bordeaux (Note: On 8 June 1814, Pilot, Le Messurier, master, the prize to Vittoria, commenced a voyage to Madeira. There Le Messurier was unable to sell his cargo, which consisted mainly of prize goods. He sailed on to Rio de Janeiro, Cayenne, St Bartholomew, and lastly St Kitts. There he sold both Pilot and her cargo at a profit. He purchased a brig, Jane, and a cargo of rum, molasses, indigo, and the like. She arrived at Guernsey on 9 May 1815.)

The same source that stated that Vittoria had been the American sloop USS Argus, reported that the Vittoria privateer, of Guernsey, had taken the Baltimore letter of marque schooner Eliza, of 272 tons (bm), five guns, and 38 men. There is no mention of such a capture in Lloyd's List.

== Fate ==
Lloyd's List reported than the privateer Invincible Napoleon had captured Vittoria, sailing from Jersey to Newfoundland, but had given up her and some other British vessels that Invincible Napoleon had captured. It is not clear that the captured Vittoria was the Vittoria of this article. However, although Lloyd's Register continued to carry Vittoria until 1819 with unchanged data, she does not appear again in Lloyd's List's ship arrival and departure data. (Note: There was a report in Lloyd's List in December 1813 that two French frigates had captured and destroyed the privateer Vittoria of Guernsey. However, the next issue stated that the report was in error. The vessel captured was the Falmouth Post Office Packet Service packet ship Little Catherine, which the Royal Navy had recaptured.)

Vittoria was carried as "Lost" in the Guernsey Registry for the year ending 30 September 1814.

== Sources ==
- Cranwell, John Philips; Crane, William Bowers (1940). Men of marque; a history of private armed vessels out of Baltimore during the War of 1812. New York: W.W. Norton & Co.
- Latimer, Jon (2009). 1812: War with America. Harvard University Press. ISBN 978-0-674-03995-7.
- Sarre, John W. (2007). Howell, Alan (ed.). Guernsey sailing ships, 1786–1936. Vol. 8. Guernsey Museum monograph series.
