= French ship Régénérateur (1811) =

Ship of the line of the French Navy

- Scale model of Achille, sister ship of French ship Régénérateur (1811), on display at the Musée national de la Marine in Paris.

History

France
- Name: Régénérateur
- Builder: Venice
- Laid down: December 1806
- Launched: 7 July 1811
- Commissioned: December 1812
- Decommissioned: 1831
- Fate: Broken up, 1831

General characteristics
- Class & type: petit Téméraire-class ship of the line
- Displacement: 2,781 tonneaux
- Tons burthen: 1,381 port tonneaux
- Length: 53.97 m (177 ft 1 in)
- Beam: 14.29 m (46 ft 11 in)
- Draught: 6.72 m (22.0 ft)
- Depth of hold: 6.9 m (22 ft 8 in)
- Sail plan: Full-rigged ship
- Crew: 705
- Armament: 74 guns: Lower gun deck: 28 × 36 pdr guns; Upper gun deck: 30 × 18 pdr guns; Forecastle and Quarterdeck: 20–26 × 8 pdr guns & 36 pdr carronades

Régénérateur was a 74-gun petite Téméraire-class ship of the line built for the French Navy during the 1810s. Completed in 1812, she was captured by the Austrian Empire two years later.

== Background and description ==
Régénérateur was one of the petit modèle of the Téméraire class that was specially intended for construction in some of the shipyards in countries occupied by the French, where there was less depth of water than in the main French shipyards. The ships had a length of 53.97 metres (177 ft 1 in), a beam of 14.29 metres (46 ft 11 in) and a depth of hold of 6.9 metres (22 ft 8 in). The ships displaced 2,781 tonneaux and had a mean draught of 6.72 metres (22 ft 1 in). They had a tonnage of 1,381 port tonneaux. Their crew numbered 705 officers and ratings during wartime. They were fitted with three masts and ship rigged.

The muzzle-loading, smoothbore armament of the Téméraire class consisted of twenty-eight 36-pounder long guns on the lower gun deck and thirty 18-pounder long guns on the upper gun deck. The petit modèle ships ordered in 1803–1804 were intended to mount sixteen 8-pounder long guns on their forecastle and quarterdeck, plus four 36-pounder obusiers on the poop deck (dunette). Later ships were intended to have fourteen 8-pounders and ten 36-pounder carronades without any obusiers, but the numbers of 8-pounders and carronades actually varied between a total of 20 to 26 weapons.

== Construction and career ==
Régénérateur was laid down on 26 December 1806 as Severo in the Venetian Arsenal and renamed Régénérateur in 1807. The ship was launched on 7 July 1811 and completed on 30 January 1812. Régénérateur was surrendered to Austria at the fall of Venice on 20 April 1814, and commissioned in the Austrian Navy on 16 May with her original name. In 1823, she was razéed into a 56-gun frigate and renamed Bellona. She was broken up in 1831.
