= Vere (1811 ship) =

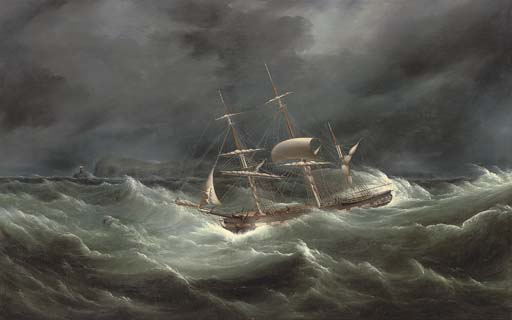
- Vere in a gale off Anglesey, 1833. (Note: At the time of this painting (1833), Vere was still in service and made one round trip that year from Liverpool to West African ports; she sailed on 12 March 1833, and returned on 24 October. Anglesey is on the shipping track for those voyages. There was another barque "Vere" at the same time, built in 1833 at Sunderland, but she made her first departure from London for Jamaica on or about 6 October 1833, and would not have been in the Anglesey area.) By Samuel Walters. (Note: Samuel Walters was a painter based in Liverpool, and Vere, was both owned and registered there.)

History

United Kingdom
- Name: Vere
- Builder: Chester
- Launched: 1811
- Fate: Grounded and condemned 1843

General characteristics
- Class & type: Barque
- Tons burthen: 440, or 445, or 460 (bm)

The barque Vere was launched in Chester, England, in 1811 as a West Indiaman. She later traded with Africa and Canada. She was last listed in 1842 as she grounded and was condemned in early 1843.

== Career ==
Vere first appeared in Lloyd's Register (LR) in 1811.

Year	Master	Owner	Trade	Source & notes
1811	T.Clegg	France & Co.	Liverpool–Jamaica	LR
1813	T.Clegg	Fletcher & Co.	Liverpool–Jamaica	LR
1815	T.Clegg; J.Dawson	Fletcher & Co.	Liverpool–Jamaica; Liverpool–New York	LR
1818	J.Asker; R.Allen	Fletcher & Co.	Liverpool–Jamaica	LR; Large repair 1817

On 26 September 1820, Vere, Allen, master, was arriving at Liverpool from Jamaica when she ran ashore on the bank near the Duke's Dock. She was got off the next day after she had discharged part of her cargo, and was brought into the dock.

On 25 October 1824, Vere, Robert Allen, master, imported merchandise with an invoice value of £2115 8s 4d to the port of Freetown, Sierra Leone.

Year	Master	Owner	Trade	Source & notes
1828	R.Allen; Arrowsmith	Fletcher & Co.	Liverpool–Jamaica	LR; damages repaired 1820 & small repair 1824
1829	J.Cudd	Tobin & Co.	Liverpool–Africa	LR; damages repaired 1820 & small repair 1824
1831	J.Cudd; J.Griffith	Tobin & Co.	Liverpool–Africa	LR; damages repaired 1820 & small repair 1824 and 1830
1832	J.Griffith; Hemmingway	Tobin & Co.	Liverpool–Africa	LR; damages repaired 1820 & small repair 1824 and 1830

Vere, Hemmingway, master, arrived at Fernando Po on 24 August 1831 from Bonny. She sailed from there on 5 September and arrived back at Liverpool around 24 November. Coming into Fernando Po she struck several times on the bar and was leaky when she left.

Year	Master	Owner	Trade	Source & notes
1834	Larkman			
1839	Casseidy; J.Wills	G.Castle; Silby & Sons	London; Poole–Quebec	LR; large repair 1840

On 27 October 1840 Vere ran aground on Hamilton's Bank, in the Solent. She was on a voyage from Quebec City to Portsmouth, Hampshire. She had to be lightened to be gotten off.

Year	Master	Owner	Trade	Source & notes
1840	J.Wills	Selby & Son	Poole–Quebec	LR; large repair 1840 and damages repaired 1841
1842	Badcock	Selby & Son	Poole–Quebec; Poole–New Brunswick	LR; large repair 1840 and damages repaired 1841

== Fate ==
On 29 March 1843, in a heavy snowstorm, Vere ran aground on Herd Harbour Point, Campbell's Islands, New Brunswick. She was refloated but subsequently had to be beached on Sandy Island, where she was condemned. She was on a voyage from Poole, Dorset to Saint John, New Brunswick. Her crew were saved.
