= Majestic (1811 ship) =

Whaler active in northern Britain from 1812 through 1819

History

United Kingdom
- Name: Majestic
- Owner: 1811:Lane (or J.Laing); 1812:William Mellish
- Builder: Sunderland
- Launched: 1811
- Fate: Wrecked 16 July 1819

General characteristics
- Tons burthen: 393 (bm)
- Armament: 10 guns

Majestic was launched at Sunderland in 1811. In 1812 she became a whaler in the British northern whale fishery, whaling at Davis Strait. She was lost there on 16 July 1819.

== Career ==
Majestic entered Lloyd's Register (LR) in 1812 with Lawrence, master, Lane, owner, changing to Mellish, and trade London, changing to London–Davis Strait.

On 5 April 1816 Lloyd's List (LL) reported that Majestic, Lawson, master, had sprung a leak and had had to put back to Stromness. She was on her way to Davis Strait and was going to have to discharge to effect repairs. Majestic had arrived at Stromness on 22 March and resumed her voyage on 31 March.

The following data is from Coltish:

Year	Master	Where	Whales	Tuns whale oil
1814	Lawson	Davis Strait	9	137
1815	Lawson	Davis Strait	6	70
1816	Lawson	Davis Strait	8	128
1817	Lawson	Davis Strait	12	170
1818	Lawson	Davis Strait	15	201

On 3 March 1818, at Lerwick during a heavy gale, Majestic, Lawson, master, drove on board Flora, Swaneson, master. Majestic carried away Flora's rigging and stove in her side.

== Fate ==
On 8 March 1819, Majestic, Lawson, master, sailed from Gravesend, bound for Davis Strait.

On 16 July 1819, Majestic was crushed by ice and sunk in the Davis Strait. Her crew were rescued. Lloyd's List reported on 24 August 1819 that Ocean, Samuels, Equestria of Hull, Majestic of London, Royal Bounty and Thomas & Ann, both of Leith, and Tey of Dundee, had been lost in Davis Strait. Their crews were saved.

== Post script ==
In 1824 a harpoon from Majestic in 1819 was recovered from a whale. The harpoon had gotten embedded in the near left fin.
