= True Briton (East Indiaman) =

Four vessels named True Briton have sailed as East Indiamen for the British East India Company (EIC):

- True Briton (1746 EIC ship) was launched at Rotherhithe and made four voyages to India or China for the EIC before she was sold in 1760 for breaking up.
- True Briton (1761 EIC ship) was launched at Deptford and made four voyages to India and China for the EIC before she was sold in 1772 for breaking up.
- True Briton (1773 EIC ship) was launched at Deptford and made four voyages to India or China for the EIC. In 1786 she was sold and renamed Carnatic. Carnatic made one voyage to China for the EIC and then was sold in 1788 for use as a hulk.
- True Briton (1790 EIC ship) made seven voyages for the EIC; she was lost without a trace in 1809 during her eighth voyage.
