= Lord Wellington (1811 Yarmouth ship) =

1811-1825 British ship

History

United Kingdom
- Name: Lord Wellington
- Namesake: Arthur Wellesley, 1st Duke of Wellington
- Builder: Great Yarmouth
- Launched: 1811
- Fate: Abandoned 13 July 1825

General characteristics
- Tons burthen: 363 (bm)
- Propulsion: Sail
- Armament: 10 × 6-pounder carronades

Lord Wellington was launched in 1811 at Great Yarmouth. She was a West Indiaman but in 1820 made one voyage to India under license from the British East India Company (EIC). Her crew abandoned her in the North Atlantic in July 1825 when she became waterlogged.

== Career ==
Lord Wellington first appeared in Lloyd's Register (LR) in 1811 with J.Hare, master, J. Preston, owner, and trade Yarmouth–London. By the next year she was a West Indiaman.

Year	Master	Owner	Trade	Source
1815	Gunhouse	Foster & Co.	London-Martinique	LR
1820	Anderson	Foster & Co.	London–Batavia	LR

On 12 July 1815, Lord Wellington, Gunhouse, master, was on her way back to England from St Domingo and Jamaica. On 9 August, Fanny, Ray, master, was totally dismasted in a gale. Her crew then abandoned her. Aurora and Lord Wellington saved the crew.

On 15 November 1816 LL reported that Lord Wellington, Anderson, master, was on her way from Plymouth to Newcastle when she ran aground on North Sand Head. She was got off and taken into Ramsgate. She had lost her anchor and cable, and was leaky.

On 17 November 1817 Lord Wellington, Anderson, master, was coming from Quebec when she put into Plymouth leaky, and having lost a boat and sails.

In 1813 the EIC had lost its monopoly on the trade between India and Britain. British ships were then free to sail to India or the Indian Ocean under a license from the EIC. On 31 August 1820 Captain J. Anderson sailed Lord Wellington for Bombay.

Year	Master	Owner	Trade	Source & notes
1825	R.Bennett	Broderick	Hull–America	LR

== Fate ==
On 13 July 1825 Lord Wellington, of Hull, Bennet, master, was sailing from Quebec when she encountered a gale at 47°N 39°W and heavy seas. As she scudded she became waterlogged. On the 18th Nottingham, which had been sailing from Derry to Quebec, rescued the crew from the tops and poop. Henry then took on Lord Wellington's master, mate, carpenter, and a boy from Nottingham. (Note: Nottingham, of Liverpool and of 403 tons (bm), J. Sharp, master, had been launched at Chester in 1819.)
