= Home Castle (1811 ship) =

History

United Kingdom
- Name: Home Castle
- Namesake: Hume Castle
- Launched: 1811, Aberdeen
- Fate: Lost 1829

General characteristics
- Tons burthen: 311, or 315 (bm)
- Armament: 8 × 9-pounder carronades

Home Castle was launched in Aberdeen in 1811. From 1813 on she was a whaler in the British northern whale fishery (Greenland and Davis Strait). She was lost in 1829, while whaling in Davis Strait.

== Career ==
Home Castle first appeared in the Register of Shipping (RS) and in Lloyd's Register in 1813.

Year	Master	Owner	Trade	Source
1813	G.Wallis	Boyd & Co.	London–Leith; Leith–Davis Strait	RS
1813	G.Wallace	C.White & Co.	Leith–Davis Strait	LR

Home Castle then made 16 annual voyages to the Northern Whale Fishery, being lost on her last. Between 1813 and 1824, she sailed from Bo'ness (Borrowstounness). Then from 1825, to her loss she sailed from Leith. Even when she belonged to Leith, she would go up to Bo'ness to boil her oil there and to overwinter.

The data below came primarily from Coltish:

Year	Master	Where	Whales	Tuns whale oil
1814	Wallace	Greenland	7	52.5
1815	Wallace	Davis Strait	4	27
1816	Wallace	Davis Strait	4	30

On her way to Davis Strait in early 1816, Home Castle became leaky and had to put into Burnt Islands, Newfoundland and Labrador to effect repairs.

Year	Master	Where	Whales	Tuns whale oil
1817	Wallace	Davis Strait	8	61
1818	Robertson	Davis Strait	5	34
1819	Wallace	Davis Strait	13	
1820	Wallace	Davis Strait	16	108.5
1821	Wallace	Greenland	17	81.5
1822	Wallace	Greenland	1	6
1823	Wallace	Greenland	18	108.5
1824	Wallace	Davis Strait	3	
1825	Wallace	Davis Strait	1	6.5
1826	Wallace	Davis Strait	3	17.5
1827	Stewart (or Stuart)	Davis Strait	19	194
1828	Stewart	Davis Strait	15	82
1829	Stewart	Davis Strait		

== Fate ==
Home Castle was wrecked on the coast of the Davis Strait, either while crossing or after having crossed Melville Bay. Ice closed in on her, crushing her on 8 July. She was just behind Eagle, so close that Home Castle's jib boom projected over Eagle's taffrail, but Eagle was unharmed.

Lady Jane rescued two of Home Castle's crew and took them into Newcastle.

Of 88 or 89 ships, only four were lost.
