= Lord Wellington (1811 Montreal ship) =

1811-1829 British ship

History

United Kingdom
- Name: Lord Wellington
- Namesake: Arthur Wellesley, 1st Duke of Wellington
- Launched: 1811, Montreal
- Fate: Last listed 1829

General characteristics
- Tons burthen: 453, or 46626/94, or 472 (bm)
- Length: 117 ft 0 in (35.7 m)
- Beam: 30 ft 7 in (9.3 m)
- Propulsion: Sail
- Armament: 10 × 18-pounder guns "of the New Construction"

Lord Wellington was launched in 1811 in Montreal. She became a London-based transport that made one voyage to India in 1819 under a license from the British East India Company (EIC). Afterwards she continued to sail to the Baltic and North America. She was last listed in 1829.

== Career ==
Lord Wellington was launched at Montreal. A letter dated 9 June 1812 stated that she had been re-registered at London.

Lord Wellington first appeared in Lloyd's Register (LR) in 1812 with Landels, master, Chapman, owner, and trade London transport.

On 16 May 1813 a gale drove the transport Lord Wellington on shore at Bermuda. She was gotten off and her cargo was saved.

On 20 January 1814 as Lord Wellington, Landelles, master, was returning to England from Bermuda, she ran down Ceres, Watkins, master, off the Lizard. Ceres had been sailing from Dublin to London. She was sunk, but Lord Wellington rescued her crew. (Note: Ceres, of 125 tons (bm), J. Watkins, master, had been launched in Wales in 1798.) Then on 17 July the transport Lord Wellington arrived at Ramsgate from Calais with elements of the 13th and 16th Dragoons. By 8 June she was at St Helena.

| Year | Master | Owner | Trade | Source & notes |
|---|---|---|---|---|
| 1815 | Landles | Chapman | London transport | LR |
| 1820 | Wasse | Chapman | London–Bengal | LR |

In 1813 the EIC had lost its monopoly on the trade between India and Britain. British ships were then free to sail to India or the Indian Ocean under a license from the EIC.

LR reported that Lord Wellington, Wase, master, had sailed for Bombay on 28 February 1819. LL reported on 12 May 1820 that Lord Wellington, Wasse, from Bengal, having struck on a sunken rock, put into Madras with damage. She sailed early in December 1819 to Trincomalee to repair, and was expected to return to Madras to sail in January 1820 for London. She actually returned to Madras on 15 February and was expected to sail for London on 2 March.

LR showed Lord Wellington with M.Majden, master, Chapman, owner, and trade Liverpool–Nova Scotia.

A letter dated Reval 17 September 1825 reported that Lord Wellington had put in leaky. She had been sailing from Narva to London when she grounded on Hang Hood. A letter dated 1 October reported that she had been hove down and was expected to commence reloading in three or four days.

== Fate ==
Lord Wellington was last listed in LR in 1827 with M.Madjen, master, Chapman, owner, and trade London. She was last listed in the Register of Shipping in 1829 with Madkin, master, Chapman, owner, and trade London–North America. Both showed her having undergone repairs in 1825 and 1826.

On 28 September 1829 Captain Lumly Madgen, of the brig John Dunn, and formerly of the ship Lord Wellington, died at Quebec.
