= Prince Regent (1811 Montreal ship) =

UK merchant ship (1811–1839)

History

United Kingdom
- Name: Prince Regent
- Namesake: The Prince Regent
- Builder: Montreal
- Launched: 1811
- Fate: Stranded June 1839

General characteristics
- Tons burthen: 244, or 245, or 250, or 256, or 263, or 264 (bm)
- Armament: 10 × 9 & 2 × 6-pounder guns (1812)

Prince Regent was launched at Montreal in 1811. She sailed to England and thereafter traded from England with the Mediterranean, but mostly across the Atlantic. She suffered maritime mishaps in 1815, 1817, 1826, and 1827. She finally stranded and was lost, though with no loss of life, in June 1839.

== Career ==
Prince Regent first appeared in Lloyd's Register (LR) in 1812.

Year	Master	Owner	Trade	Source
1812	Jones	At Liverpool	London–West Indies	LR

On 3 January 1812, Prince Regent, Jones, master, arrived at Sheerness from Quebec.

Year	Master	Owner	Trade	Source
1813	J.Jones	Morrall & Co.	London–Malta	Register of Shipping (RS)
1814	J.Jones; J.Stafford	At Liverpool	London–Malta	LR
1815	J.Stafford	Baring	London–Havana	RS

On 25 January 1815 Prince Regent, Stafford, master, was anchored at Gibraltar when a gale caused her to part her cables and drove her aground. She was carrying a cargo from Malta to Havana. She was soon got off with little damage.

Year	Master	Owner	Trade	Source
1816	J.Stafford; W.Barden	Baring; Holmes	London–Havana; London–Gibraltar	RS

On 13 August 1817, Prince Regent, Bardon, master, was on her way from Havana to Amsterdam when she ran aground on the flats near Eyerland. After 216 boxes of sugar had been offloaded she was refloated and came into the Texel.

On 25 April 1818, Prince Regent, Bardon, master, came Harwich from Amsterdam with the loss of cables and two anchors. She had been blown out of the Texel on the 23rd.

Year	Master	Owner	Trade	Source & notes
1818	W.Bardon	H.Holmes	London–Jamaica	LR
1819	W.Young	H.Holmes	London–Jamaica	LR
1820	W.Young	H.Holmes	London–News Brunswick	LR
1821	W.Young; Holmes; Coppinger	H.Holmes	London–News Brunswick	LR
1822	T.Coppinger	H.Holmes	London–Demerara	LR
1826	T.Coppinger; Masterman	H.Holmes	London–Demerara; Bristol–Quebec	LR; good repair 1826

On 27 November 1825, Prince Regent, Masterman, master, was on her way from St John, New Brunswick, to Newport, when she encountered a gale at 50°N 25°W. She received considerable damage to her upperworks and took on eight feet of water in her hold. On 13 December she passed through Cardiff Roads.

On 8 July 1826 as Prince Regent, Masterman, master, was on her way from Bristol to Quebec she lost her mainmast and sails. On 18 July she had to put into Plymouth. While she was there she was found to be very leaky and had to discharge part of her cargo.

Year	Master	Owner	Trade	Source & notes
1829	Masterman; G.Bosence	Captain & Co.	Bristol–Quebec	LR; good repair 1826
1830	G.Bosenet	Humphrey	Waterford–Quebec	LR; good repair 1826
1831	G.Bosenet	Humphrey	Cork–Boston	LR; good repair 1826 and large repair 1831
1834	Rosence	Phillips	Newport–Quebec	LR; good repair 1826 and some repairs 1831
1835	J.Smith	Phillips	Newport–Quebec	LR; good repair 1826 and some repairs 1831
1839	W.Pines	Phillips	Newport–New York	LR; large repair 1836, and some repairs 1833 & 1839

In December 1838, Prince Regent, Pures, master, arrived at Newport from Quebec with her foremast sprung and her deck having been swept by the seas.

== Fate ==
In June 1839, Prince Regent, Price, master, was on her way from Newport to New York with a cargo of rod iron, when she came into Tramore Bay. Captain Price was able to get her anchors out before she drove onto the strand. He had intended to go into Waterford to exchange his crew but had mistaken Tramore for the Waterford estuary a few miles to the east. The coastguard was able to land safely all 27 passengers and the 13 or so men of her crew. She grounded, and the initial expectations were that she might be gotten off. Some of her cargo was unloaded. The passengers were emigrants from Wales.

Her entry in Lloyd's Register for 1839 bore the annotation Stranded, and she was not listed again in the volume for 1840.
