= Barrosa (1811 ship) =

UK East India merchant and convict and migrant transport ship 1811–1847

History

United Kingdom
- Name: Barrosa
- Namesake: Battle of Barrosa (5 March 1811)
- Owner: 1813:Ferguson; EIC voyages #1-3: John William Buckle; EIC voyages #4-5: Buckle & Co.; EIC voyage#6: John Clarkson; 1833:Joseph Somes; 1846:Mitcheson & Co.
- Builder: White, Cossipore, Calcutta
- Launched: 30 December 1811
- Fate: Wrecked 10 January 1847

General characteristics
- Tons burthen: 697, or 700, or 729, or 72974/94, or 730, or 968 (bm)
- Armament: 18 guns
- Notes: Teak-built three-decker

Barrosa (or Barrossa, or Barossa, or Barosa) was launched in 1811 at Cossipore. She sailed to England and then made six voyages for the British East India Company (EIC); during this period she also made one voyage carrying immigrants to South Africa. After the EIC gave up its maritime activities in 1833-1834, Barossa became a transport. She made three voyages transporting convicts to Australia. She was lost in 1847, without loss of life, while transporting contract labourers from Madras to Jamaica.

== Career ==
Shortly after her launch Barossa sailed to England.

=== 1st EIC voyage (1812) ===
Barossa was at Calcutta on 1 March 1812. Captain Benjamin Fergusson sailed from there and was at Saugor on 10 May. Barossa was at Madras on 12 June, reached St Helena on 6 September, and arrived at The Downs on 6 November.

Barossa was sold in England and was admitted to the Registry on 12 February 1813. She entered Lloyd's Register (LR) in 1813, with Ferguson as master and owner.

=== Licensed trade with India ===
In 1814, the EIC lost its monopoly on the trade between England and India. Thereafter, many shipowners sailed their vessels in that trade under a license from the EIC. In 1816, her master and owner changed from Ferguson to Hawkey. Hawkey had purchased Barrosa and she was the first ship to take advantage of the new opportunity. (Note: Hawkey had been Chief Mate on Astell at the action of 3 July 1810. Captain Robert Hay was severely wounded in the action and Hawkey took command of her. Because of his successful handling of Astell, the EIC promoted Hawkey to captain and Lloyd's Patriotic Fund awarded him with a sword.) One of the passenger's on Barrosa's first voyage as a free trader was William's brother Captain Charles Hawkey, of the Royal Navy, who was returning to India. When Barrosa reached the Cape, Captain Charles Hawkey fought a duel with Major Clason of the EIC's service that resulted in Clason's death. After she left the Cape, after a long detention, Barrosa encountered severe weather that damaged her and her cargo. She arrived at Madras and Calcutta later than Hawkey had intended and as a result other vessels had arrived before her and sold their cargoes, depressing the market. The EIC, exceptionally, authorized Hawkey to sail to China, which Hawkey hoped would re-establish the voyage's profitability. Captain William Hawkey died at sea on 19 September 1816, aged 33; his memorial is at St Paul's Hill, Malacca.

Lloyd's List reported on 25 July 1817, that Barrosa, Hawkey, late master, had arrived in China. Only three days earlier Lloyd's List had reported that she was one of four vessels that had been lost in a typhoon in the China Sea. She returned to Bengal from China, and then eventually to England.

=== 2nd EIC voyage (1819–1820) ===
The EIC accepted on 5 February 1819, the tender of Barossa by John William Buckle for one journey. The rate was £12 per ton for destination Madras or Bombay, and £12 15s per ton for Bengal.

Captain Henry Hutchinson sailed from The Downs on 5 May, bound for Bombay. Barossa reached the Cape on 12 August, and arrived at Bombay on 9 October. She left Bombay on 11 January 1820, was at the Cape on 2 April, reached St Helena on 21 April, and arrived at Purfleet on 9 July.

=== 3rd EIC voyage (1821–1822) ===
Captain Hutchinson sailed from The Downs on 21 June 1821, bound for Bengal. Barossa arrived at Diamond Harbour on 17 November, and Calcutta on 6 December. Homeward bound, she was at Vizagapatam on 18 February 1822, and Madras on 16 March. She arrived at her moorings on 5 November.

=== Emigrants to South Africa (1823) ===
In 1823 a Mr. J. Ingram chartered Barossa to bring out 400 colonists from the south of Ireland to the Cape Colony. Fifty were to be at his expenses, and 200 men, 50 women, and 100 children were to be at the expense of the government. Ingram received an advance of £14 per person to cover transportation, provisions, bedding, and medical expenses. Barossa brought 352 persons: 188 men, 59 women, 78 boys, and 27 girls. A dispute arose between Ingram and the government over the reimbursement and whether Ingram had met the terms of his contract.

On 26 July 1823, Captain Hutchinson sailed Barossa to Mauritius.

A hurricane on 23 February 1824, drove Barossa ashore at Port Louis. She sustained minor damage. She sailed for Bengal around 20 March. On 26 February 1824, Mr. & Mrs. Brownrigg brought with them on Barossa, from Mauritius, three male and two female domestic slaves.

In 1825, the Register of Shipping reported Barossa's trades as London–Cape of Good Hope, changing to London–Calcutta. On 26 September 1826, Barrossa, Captain H. Hutchinson, sailed for Calcutta under a license from the EIC.

She returned to Gravesend on 14 December 1826. She had left Bengal on 5 May, Madras on 7 June, Mauritius on 5 September, and Saint Helena on 17 October.

=== 4th EIC voyage (1827–1828) ===
Captain Hutchinson sailed from The Downs on 16 April 1827, bound for China. She arrived at Whampoa on 3 September. Homeward bound, she crossed the Second Bar on 30 October, reached St Helena on 14 January 1828, and arrived at Blackwall on 25 March.

=== 5th EIC voyage (1828) ===
Captain Hutchinson sailed from East India Dock on 12 June 1828, and arrived at Calcutta on 10 December. On 4 June, the EIC had accepted a tender by Buckles & Co. of £3 15s per man to carry troops to the Cape, Ceylon, and Bengal.

=== 6th EIC voyage (1832–1833) ===
The EIC on 18 April 1832, accepted Buckles & Co. tender of Barossa at a rate of £9 15s per ton for one voyage to China, Halifax, and Quebec. Captain Orlando Hart Wilson sailed from The Downs on 10 June, bound for China and Quebec. Barossa arrived at Whampoa on 29 October. Homeward bound, she crossed the Second Bar on 24 January 1833, and arrived at Quebec on 18 June. She arrived at her moorings on 5 September.

=== Transport ===
In 1833 Joseph Somes purchased Barossa and hired her out as a transport.

=== First convict voyage (1839) ===
On 4 August 1839 Captain John Austin sailed from Dublin for New South Wales. Barrosa sailed via the Cape and arrived at Port Jackson on 8 December. She had embarked 336 male convicts and she disembarked 334, two convicts having died on the voyage.

=== Second convict voyage (1841-1842) ===
Captain John Austin sailed from Sheerness on 30 August 1841, bound for Van Diemen’s Land. Barrosa sailed via Tenerife and arrived at Hobart on 13 January 1842. She had embarked 350 male convicts and she landed 347, having lost three convicts on the voyage.

=== Third convict voyage (1844) ===
Captain Henry H. Greaves sailed from Dublin on 14 July 1844, bound for Van Diemen’s Land. Barossa arrived at Hobart on 5 September. She had embarked 322 male convicts and she landed 320, having lost two convicts on the voyage.

== Fate ==
In 1846, Somes sold Barossa to Mitcheson & Co., London. Her master changed from Austin to Dodds, and her trade from London transport to London–Bombay.

An item in The Spectator states that Barossa had wrecked at Port Morant while carrying contract labourers from Madras to Jamaica. The crew and emigrants were saved. The Illustrated London News referenced a report from the Jamaica Dispatch that Barossa had wrecked on a reef on 10 January 1847 due to the negligence of the pilot. All 340 labourers were saved. Lloyd's Register for 1846 carried the notation "LOST" by her name.
