= Marcellus (1811 ship) =

American trading ship

History

United States
- Name: Marcellus
- Namesake: Marcus Claudius Marcellus
- Launched: 1811, Boston, Massachusetts
- Fate: Wrecked 13 August 1820

General characteristics
- Tons burthen: 370, or 385 (bm)
- Notes: Spruce beams and knees

Marcellus was launched in Boston in 1811. She traded between Liverpool and the United States, all the while retaining American ownership though possibly with British registry. It is not entirely clear how her owners dealt with the War of 1812. Lloyd's List's ship arrival and departure data does show a voyage between Lisbon and Baltimore during that period. She was lost in 1820 on a voyage to Bombay.

== Career ==
Marcellus first appeared in Lloyd's Register (LR) in 1812.

Year	Master	Owner	Trade	Source
1812	William Ward	Boston	Liverpool–St Ubes	LR
1816	Ward; S.Bickwell	Boston	Liverpool–Virginia	LR
1821	S.Bickwell	C.Coolidge & Co.	Liverpool–New York	LR

== Fate ==
Marcellus, Ahorn, master, wrecked on 13 August 1820 on Saugor Island, in the River Hooghly. She was sailing to Calcutta from Holland. Her cargo was saved.
