= Theodosia (1815 ship) =

History

United Kingdom
- Name: Theodosia
- Launched: 1811
- Acquired: By purchase of a prize
- Fate: Abandoned on fire on 3 February 1820

General characteristics
- Tons burthen: 255, (bm)

Theodosia was built in the United States in 1811, almost certainly under another name. She was taken in prize and began sailing under the British flag in 1815. She sailed between London and India under a license from the British East India Company (EIC). She caught fire in February 1820 and her crew and passengers had to abandon ship.

== Career ==
Theodosia first appeared in Lloyd's Register (LR) in 1815.

In 1813 the EIC had lost its monopoly on the trade between India and Britain. British ships were then free to sail to India or the Indian Ocean under a license from the EIC. Though the entries in the LR only show her voyages as going to the Cape, she did in fact sail to India. For instance Theodosia, Flinn, master, arrived at Mauritius on 5 February 1819, and intended to sail to Bengal on the 27th. On 12 June she had to put back at Bengal because of problems with her windlass.

Year	Master	Owner	Trade	Source & notes
1815	J.Flinn	Nourse & Co.	London–Cape of Good Hope	LR
1820	J.Flinn	Nourse & Co.	London–Cape of Good Hope	LR

== Fate ==
On 31 January 1820 Theodosia sailed from Table Bay for Algoa Bay. On 3 February she caught fire. Crew and passengers took to her boats and abandoned her. They reached the Cape of Good Hope on 5 February after having spent 40 hours in the boats without water or provisions.
