= Lady Holland (1811 ship) =

History

United Kingdom
- Name: Lady Holland
- Builder: John King, Upnor, Rochester
- Launched: 9 April 1811
- Fate: Wrecked 13 February 1830

General characteristics
- Tons burthen: 445, or 45261/94 (bm)
- Length: 117 ft 6 in (35.8 m)
- Beam: 29 ft 2 in (8.9 m)

Lady Holland was launched in 1811 at Rochester, as a West Indiaman. She underwent one maritime incident in 1812. She continued sailing to the West Indies until 1826. Then she began sailing to India under a license from the British East India Company. She wrecked in February 1830 on the outbound leg of her third voyage to Bengal.

== Career ==
Lady Holland first appeared in Lloyd's Register in 1811.

Year	Master	Owner	Trade	Source
1811	Sullivan	Plummer	London–Jamaica	LR

Lady Holland, Sullivan, master, was run ashore at Savanna-la-Mar, Jamaica on 1 July 1812. She was on a voyage from Jamaica to London.

Year	Master	Owner	Trade	Source & notes
1812	Sullivan; Foubister	Plummer	London–Jamaica	LR; damages repaired 1812

On 1 July 1813 Lady Holland, Foubister, master, sailed with the fleet homeward bound from Jamaica. She was missing on the 21st and had lost her foremast running into Jane.

Year	Master	Owner	Trade	Source & notes
1816	Foubester; Robertson; Dennam	Plummer	London–Jamaica	LR; damages repaired 1812
1818	Robson; Plummer	Plummer	London–Jamaica	LR; damages repaired 1812
1822	Powell	G.Joad (or Goad)	London–Jamaica	LR; small repairs 1821
1824	Powell; Hearn; Rogers	G.Joad	London–Jamaica	LR; small repairs 1821
1826	Rogers; J.Snell	G.Joad	London–Jamaica; London–Calcutta	LR; small repairs 1821 * almost rebuilt 1825

In 1813 the EIC had lost its monopoly on the trade between India and Britain. British ships were then free to sail to India or the Indian Ocean under a license from the EIC. On 30 April 1826 Lady Holland, Snell, master, sailed from Portsmouth, bound for Madras and Bengal. Homeward bound, she sailed from Madras on 26 October, and the Cape on 15 January 1827. She sailed from Saint Helena on 5 February, passed Ascension Island that same day, and arrived in London on 30 March.

Lady Holland made a second such voyage. She left on her third voyage to Bengal on 4 October 1829.

== Fate ==
Lady Holland, Snell, master, wrecked on Dassen Island, Cape of Good Hope, on 13 February 1830. All on board were rescued. She was on a voyage from London to Bengal. All aboard reached the island in the ship's boats. It was expected that much of her cargo, consisting of Madeira wine in casks, would be saved.
