= Lord Wellington (1811 Quebec ship) =

History

United Kingdom
- Name: Lord Wellington
- Namesake: Arthur Wellesley, 1st Duke of Wellington
- Builder: John Goudie, Quebec
- Launched: 1811
- Fate: Last listed in 1844

General characteristics
- Tons burthen: Old Act:271, or 272, or 288, or 388 (bm); New Act:276 (bm)
- Length: 95 ft (29.0 m)
- Beam: 26 ft (7.9 m)
- Propulsion: Sail
- Armament: 2 × 4-pounder guns + 6 × 12-pounder carronades

Lord Wellington was launched in 1811 in Quebec and in 1812 changed her registry to London. She spent most of her career sailing between Great Britain and North America, though she spent her last few years as a coastal collier. In 1832, during the 1832 cholera outbreak in Ireland, she was the site of an outbreak of cholera that killed several passengers and crew. She was last listed in 1844.

== Career ==
Lord Wellington was launched at Quebec. A letter dated 9 March 1812 stated that she had been re-registered at London.

Lord Wellington first appeared in Lloyd's Register (LR) in 1812. Her master was Mitchell, her owner J.R. Cato, and her trade London–Quebec. The entry gave her burthen as 388 tons, a number that was eventually revised down by 100 or more tons.

Year	Master	Owner	Trade	Source
1815	J.Michell	J.R. Cato	London transport	RS
1820	J.Mitchell	Thompson	Liverpool–Darien	RS
1825	Pollock; Maxwell	Boyd; Williams	Liverpool–Nova Scotia	RS; damages repaired 1823

On 18 February 1824 Lord Wellington, Maxwell, master, was sailing into Newry with a cargo of coal from Liverpool. Lord Wellington ran on shore at Cranfield Point. It was expected that she would be gotten off. A report from Liverpool dated 8 March stated that Lord Wellington, Maxwell, master, which had gone on shore at Carlingford Bay, had been gotten off without damage, and without suffering from leaks.

Year	Master	Owner	Trade	Source
1830	Roach	Williams	Liverpool–Quebec	LR; damages repaired in 1823 & small repairs 1829
1833	W.Culliton	Howlett & Co.	Waterford–Quebec	LR; good repair 1823 & small repair 1830
1833	W.Culletson	Howlett & Co.	London–New York	RS; damages repaired 1823 and small repairs 1829

Cholera outbreak (1832): There were already reports of cholera in the Waterford area when Lord Wellington stopped at Passage East on 15 June 1832, a few days after she had embarked passengers at New Ross. A number of passengers alighted, stating that there was cholera aboard the ship. By the 17th several of the passengers who had left the ship were dead or ill, and several passengers or crew were also dead or ill. That day Lord Wellington sailed for Milford Haven, one of three ports designated for vessels requiring quarantine due to illness aboard.

At Waterford the inhabitants shunned the ill Captain Culleton had landed until a clergyman persuaded them to render assistance. When Lord Wellington arrived at Milford Haven the physicians that came on board discovered bodies on deck.

Lord Wellington left Milford Haven on 29 June to resume her voyage to Quebec. On 13 August Lord Wellington, Collaton, master, landed 167 immigrants at Quebec.

Year	Master	Owner	Trade	Source
1836	W.Black		Waterford	
1840	T.Brown	Brown	London collier	LR; small repairs 1836 & damages repaired 1838 271/276
1844	T.Brown	Brown	London collier	LR; small repairs 1836 & damages repaired 1838 271/276

== Fate ==
Lord Wellington was last listed in 1844.
