= True Briton (1811 ship) =

British merchant ship (1811–1822)

History

United Kingdom
- Name: True Briton
- Builder: Pont Neuf, Quebec
- Launched: 11 September 1811
- Fate: Abandoned 1822

General characteristics
- Tons burthen: 38116/94, or 398 (bm)

True Briton was launched at Pont Neuf, Quebec, in 1811. Her primary trade was sailing between Britain and New Brunswick, but she also sailed to Jamaica, and made two voyages to India. Her crew abandoned her in the Atlantic in 1822.

== Career ==
True Briton first entered Lloyd's Register (LR) in 1812 with John Kirby, master, Ridsdale & Co., owners, and trade London–New Brunswick.

In 1814 her master changed from Kirby to Williams, her owner from Ridsdale to Gladstone & Co., and her trade from London to Liverpool–Jamaica. She had undergone repairs in 1814. In 1815 her master changed from P. Williams to Cameron. In 1816 she sailed from Liverpool to Madeira.

The British East India Company (EIC) had lost its monopoly on the trade between Britain and India in 1813. True Briton became one of the many vessels that entered that trade. Lloyd's Register for 1818 showed her master changing from J.O.Head to Hannys, and her trade from Liverpool–Île de France to Liverpool–Calcutta.

However, Captain J.O.Head had already sailed in January 1817 to Madras and Bengal under a license from the EIC. Then Captain A. Hannay sailed on 28 October 1818 bound for Fort William, India. By 1820 True Briton's master was J. Wright, her owner was still Gladstone, and her trade was Liverpool–New Brunswick.

Lloyd's Register for 1822 listed True Briton with J.Wright, master, Gladstone & Co., owners, and trade Liverpool–New Brunswick. She had undergone small repairs in 1820.

== Loss ==
On 25 August 1822 her crew abandoned True Briton, Harvey, master, at 55°N 30°W as they expected her to founder immediately. She had been on a voyage from Liverpool to St John, New Brunswick. Hebe, of Quebec, returned the crew to Liverpool on 3 September.
