= List of vessels of the Hudson's Bay Company =

The Hudson's Bay Company, at one time a fur trading business, has operated a large fleet of vessels in its history.

== Ship list ==
List of Hudson's Bay Company vessels
Image	Vessel	Type	Start	End	Area
	Aklavik	Motor vessel	1923	1942	Western Arctic
	Anson Northup (a.k.a. The Pioneer)	Steamboat	1861	1861	Interior
	Anyox	Steamship (chartered by HBC)	1933	1933	Western Arctic
	Athabasca	Stern wheel steamer	1888	1897	Interior
	Athabasca River	Stern wheel steamer	1912	1917	Interior
	Athabasca River	Stern wheel tug	1922	1949	Interior
	Banksland	Freighter	1955	1964	Western Arctic
	Baychimo	Steel steamer	1921	1931	Europe, Western Arctic, Eastern Arctic
	Bayeskimo	Steel screw steamer	1922	1925	Eastern Arctic
	Baymaud	Motor schooner	1926	1927	Western Arctic
	Baynain	Steel screw steamer	1928	1930	Eastern Arctic
	Bayrupert	Steel screw steamer	1926	1927	Eastern Arctic
	Beaver	Steamship	1835	1860	Pacific Northwest
	Beaver	Sloop, converted to brig	1788	1793	Europe, Hudson Bay, James Bay
	Beaver Lake	Twin-screw diesel tug	1938	1947	Interior
	Brierley Hill	Barque	1872	1881	Europe, Pacific Northwest
	Brothers	Barque, chartered by HBC	1843	1845	Europe, Pacific Northwest
	Broughton	Sloop	1826	1836	Pacific Northwest
	Buffalo Lake	Tunnel sterned tug (twin screw)	1930	post-1939	Interior
	Cadborough	Schooner	1826	1850	Europe, Pacific Northwest
	Caledonia	Stern paddlewheel	1890	1907	Pacific Northwest
	Cam Owen	Brigantine	1883	1886	Europe, Hudson Bay, James Bay
	Camden		1824	1831	Europe, Hudson Bay, James Bay
	Carnatic	Full-rigged ship	1858	1860	Europe, Pacific Northwest
	Ceres	Brig	1802	1804	Europe, Hudson Bay, James Bay
	Charlotte	Brig	1769	1782	Europe, Hudson Bay, James Bay
	Charlotte	Sloop	1775	1781	Europe, Hudson Bay, James Bay
	Cheshire Cat	Auxiliary yacht	1910	1910	Europe, Eastern Arctic
	Cheyenne	Sidewheeler	1881	1881	Interior
	Chief Commissioner	Screw steamer	1872	1875	Interior
	City of Winnipeg	Sternwheeler	1881	1881	Interior
	Colinda	Barque, chartered by HBC	1853	1854	Europe, Pacific Northwest
	Columbia	Barque	1835	1850	Europe, Pacific Northwest
	Colvile	Screw steamer	1875	1882	Interior
	Corea	Barque	1860	1861	Europe, Hudson Bay, James Bay, Eastern Arctic
	Cowlitz	Barque	1840	1851	Europe, Pacific Northwest
	D.A. Thomas	Steamship	1924	1930	Interior
	Dering	Frigate	1692	1697	Europe, Eastern Arctic
	Dering	Pink, fireship	1688	1689	Europe, Eastern Arctic
	Diamond	Barque, chartered by HBC	1842	1843	Europe, Pacific Northwest
	Diana	Screw steamer	1880	1888	Europe, Eastern Arctic
	Discovery	Barque-rigged auxiliary steamer	1905	1920	Europe, Hudson Bay, James Bay, Eastern Arctic
	Distributor	Sternwheeler tug	1924	1947	Interior
	Dryad	Brigantine, chartered by HBC	1825	1836	Europe, Pacific Northwest
	Eagle	Brigantine	1827	1837	Europe, Hudson Bay, James Bay, Pacific Northwest
	Eaglet	Ketch	1668	1668	Europe, Eastern Arctic
	Eddystone	Full-rigged ship	1807	1823	Europe, Hudson Bay, James Bay
	Edward and Ann	Full-rigged ship, chartered by HBC	1811	1811	Europe, Hudson Bay, James Bay
	Emerald	Brig	1816	1817	Europe, Hudson Bay, James Bay
	Enterprise	Sidewheeler	1862	1883	Pacific Northwest
	Erik	Screw steamer	1888	1900	Europe, Eastern Arctic
	Eskimo	Single screw motor vessel	1947	1949	Hudson Bay, James Bay, Eastern Arctic
	Esquimaux	Brigantine	1835	1836	Europe, Hudson Bay, James Bay, Eastern Arctic
	Forager	Chartered by HBC	1839	1841	Europe, Pacific Northwest
	Fort Charles	Wooden ketch	1940	1959	Hudson Bay, James Bay
	Fort Churchill	Motor sailing vessel	1913	1939	Hudson Bay, James Bay
	Fort Garry	Schooner	post-1924	1939	Eastern Arctic
	Fort Garry	Steel Naval Stores Lighter	1950	1961	Hudson Bay, James Bay
	Fort Hearne	Motor screw	1949	1961	Western Arctic
	Fort James	Two-masted auxiliary schooner	1928	1937	Western Arctic, Eastern Arctic
	Fort McPherson	Gas schooner	1914	1930	Western Arctic
	Fort Ross	Motor vessel	1938	1950	Western Arctic
	Fort Severn	Auxiliary wood schooner	1926	1950	Hudson Bay, James Bay
	Fort York	Motor schooner	1914	1930	Hudson Bay, James Bay
	Fox	Schooner	1850	1878	Hudson Bay, James Bay
	Fox	Yawl	1885	1918	Eastern Arctic
	Frances	Schooner	1836	1843	Europe, Hudson Bay, James Bay
	Ganymede	Barque, chartered by HBC	1828	1837	Europe, Hudson Bay, James Bay, Pacific Northwest, Eastern Arctic
	Glaramara	Barque	1865	1867	Europe, Pacific Northwest
	Gomelza	Full-rigged ship, chartered by HBC	1859	1859	Europe, Pacific Northwest
	Grahame	Sternwheeler	1884	1896	Interior
	Hadlow	Full-rigged ship	1815	1816	Europe, Hudson Bay, James Bay
	Hampshire	Frigate	1697	1697	Eastern Arctic
	Harmony	Auxiliary steamer	1926	1927	Eastern Arctic
	Harpooner	Brigantine or barque, chartered by HBC	1848	1850	Pacific Northwest
	Holgate	Steamship, chartered by HBC	1916	1916	Europe
	Huband	Frigate	1687	1687	Europe, Eastern Arctic
	Hudson's Bay	Pink, frigate	1689	1697	Europe, Hudson Bay, James Bay, Eastern Arctic
	Inenew	Steamship	1902	1903	Europe, Hudson Bay, James Bay
	International	Double-decked sternwheeler	1867	1871	Interior
	Isabella	Brig	1829	1830	Europe, Pacific Northwest
	Isobel	Schooner	1851	1857	Interior
	James	Ketch	1682	1683	Eastern Arctic
	John & Alexander	Fireship, lent to HBC	1679	1680	Eastern Arctic
	Kayoshk	Schooner	1874	1879	Eastern Arctic
	King George	Full-rigged ship	1750	1755	Europe, Hudson Bay, James Bay
	King George	Full-rigged ship	1761	1780	Europe, Hudson Bay, James Bay
	King George	Full-rigged ship	1781	1812	Europe, Hudson Bay, James Bay
	Kitty	Barque, chartered by HBC	1859	1859	Eastern Arctic
	Koksoak	Peterhead	1929	1944	Eastern Arctic
	Kugyuk	Motor screw schooner (tug)	1925	1926	Western Arctic
	Labouchere	Sidewheeler	1858	1866	Europe, Pacific Northwest
	Labrador	Screw steamer/barque	1866	1887	Europe, Eastern Arctic
	Lady Frances Simpson	Schooner	1852	1858	Hudson Bay, James Bay
	Lady Head	Barque	1865	1903	Europe, Hudson Bay, James Bay, Pacific Northwest
	Lady Kindersley	Schooner	1921	1924	Western Arctic
	Lady Lampson	Barque	1869	1878	Europe, Pacific Northwest
	Lama	Brigantine	1832	1837	Pacific Northwest
	Lauriston	Barque	1916	1917	Europe
	Liard River	Sternwheeler	1918	1922	Interior
	Liard River	Tunnel sterned motor tug	1923	1947	Interior
	Lily	Sternwheeler	1877	1883	Interior
	Lively	Brig, chartered by HBC	1822	1824	Europe, Pacific Northwest
	Mackenzie River	Sternwheeler	1908	1947	Interior
	Mainwaring	Schooner	1807	1820	Europe, Hudson Bay, James Bay
	Manitoba	Sternwheeler	1880	1884	Interior
	Margaret A.	Motor schooner	1934	1943	Western Arctic
	Marquette	Sternwheeler	1879	1883	Interior
	Marquis	Sternwheeler	1882	1886	Interior
	Marten)	Brig	1845	1850	Eastern Arctic
	Marten	Schooner	1852	1878	Europe, Hudson Bay, James Bay
	Mary	Frigate	1737	1749	Europe, Hudson Bay, James Bay
	Mary Dare	Brigantine	1846	1854	Europe, Pacific Northwest
	Messenger	Fan-tail stern	1897	1906	Interior
	Midge	Schooner	1877	1877	Eastern Arctic
	Mink	Schooner	1874	1903	Europe, Hudson Bay, James Bay
	Mount Royal	Sternwheeler	1902	1907	Pacific Northwest
	Nascopie	Steel screw semi-icebreaker	1912	1947	Europe, Hudson Bay, James Bay, Eastern Arctic
	Neophyte	Motor ketch	1946	1947	Hudson Bay, James Bay
	Nereide	Brig	1833	1840	Europe, Pacific Northwest
	Nigalik	Ketch	1938	1952	Western Arctic
	Nimble	Brigantine	1792	1793	Europe, Hudson Bay, James Bay
	Nonsuch Replica	Ketch, replica	1968	1974	Europe, Pacific Northwest, Interior
	Norman Morison	Barque	1849	1853	Europe, Pacific Northwest
	North West	Sternwheeler	1882	1897	Interior
	Northcote	Stern paddlewheel steamer	1874	1886	Interior
	Northland Echo	Sternwheel tug	1928	1945	Interior
	Northwest Fox	Frigate	1689	1690	Europe, Eastern Arctic
	Ocean Nymph	Barque	1863	1884	Europe, Hudson Bay, James Bay, Eastern Arctic
	Old Maid	Schooner	1928	1930	Western Arctic
	Otter	Screw steamer	1853	1883	Europe, Pacific Northwest
	Pagwa	Motor tug	1923	1924	Interior
	Pandora	Brig	1846	1851	Pacific Northwest
	Pelican	Screw sloop	1901	1920	Europe, Hudson Bay, James Bay, Eastern Arctic
	Pelly Lake				
	Perseverance	Barque	1891	1900	Europe, Hudson Bay, James Bay, Eastern Arctic
	Port Simpson	Sternwheeler	1908	1918	Pacific Northwest
	Prince Albert	Barque	1841	1856	Europe, Hudson Bay, James Bay, Pacific Northwest
	Prince Arthur	Barque	1854	1864	Europe, Hudson Bay, James Bay
	Prince George	Full-rigged ship, chartered by HBC	1834	1837	Europe, Hudson Bay, James Bay
	Prince of Wales	Full-rigged ship	1793	1841	Europe, Hudson Bay, James Bay
	Prince of Wales	Schooner	1845	1850	Pacific Northwest
	Prince of Wales	Barque	1850	1885	Europe, Hudson Bay, James Bay, Pacific Northwest
	Prince Rupert	Frigate	1744	1760	Europe, Hudson Bay, James Bay
	Prince Rupert	Presumed pink	1755	1768	Europe, Hudson Bay, James Bay
	Prince Rupert	"Ship" frigate	1769	1786	Europe, Hudson Bay, James Bay
	Prince Rupert	Sailing ship	1827	1841	Europe, Hudson Bay, James Bay
	Prince Rupert	Barque	1841	1853	Europe, Hudson Bay, James Bay
	Prince Rupert	"Clipper" Barque	1865	1886	Europe, Hudson Bay, James Bay, Pacific Northwest
	Prince Rupert	Barque	1887	1891	Europe, Hudson Bay, James Bay
	Princess	Schooner	1892	1896	Hudson Bay, James Bay
	Princess Louise	Side paddle-wheeler	1878	1883	Pacific Northwest
	Princess Royal	Frigate	1854	1885	Europe, Hudson Bay, James Bay, Pacific Northwest
	Queen Charlotte	Full-rigged ship	1790	1800	Europe, Hudson Bay, James Bay
	Recovery	Brigantine	1852	1859	Pacific Northwest
	Robin	Schooner	1843	1856	Hudson Bay, James Bay
	Ruby	Schooner, chartered by HBC	1914	1923	Europe, Western Arctic
	Rupertsland	Steel motor vessel	1948	1960	Hudson Bay, James Bay, Eastern Arctic
	Saskalta			1921	
	Saskatchewan	Steamboat	1873	1873	Interior
	Saskatchewan	Sternwheeler	1905	1909	Interior
	Seahorse	Pink	1734	1764	Europe Hudson Bay, James Bay
	Seahorse	"Ship" frigate	1765	1781	Europe, Hudson Bay, James Bay
	Seahorse	Full-rigged ship	1782	1792	Europe, Hudson Bay, James Bay
	Sorine	Barque, chartered by HBC	1910	1911	Europe, Hudson Bay, James Bay
	Stork	Barque	1904	1908	Europe, Hudson Bay, James Bay
	Strathcona	Stern steam paddlewheel	1898	1902	Pacific Northwest
	Sumatra	Barque, chartered by HBC	1836	1838	Europe, Pacific Northwest
	Titania	Clipper	1885	1893	Europe, Pacific Northwest
	Tory	Barque, chartered by HBC	1850	1851	Europe, Pacific Northwest
	Una	Brigantine	1849	1852	Europe, Pacific Northwest
	Union	Sloop	1824	1831	Hudson Bay, James Bay
	Valleyfield	Barque, chartered by HBC	1841	1843	Europe, Pacific Northwest
	Vancouver	Schooner	1826	1834	Pacific Northwest
	Vancouver	Barque	1838	1848	Europe, Pacific Northwest
	Vancouver	Brigantine	1852	1853	Pacific Northwest
	Walrus	Sloop	1851	1857	Europe, Hudson Bay, James Bay
	Walrus	Schooner	1872	1876	Europe, Eastern Arctic
	Wave	Schooner	1840	1841	Europe, Pacific Northwest
	Weenusk	Motor boat	1920	1938	Interior
	Weenusk	Steel tug	1940	1951	Interior
	William and Ann	Snow	1824	1829	Europe, Pacific Northwest
