= William Alexander Mouat =

British seafarer and sea captain

- Born: 9 April 1821; London, England
- Died: 11 April 1871; Knight Inlet, British Columbia, Canada
- Occupations: Master mariner and fur trader
- Years active: 1835–1871
- Employer: Hudson's Bay Company
- Spouse: Mary Ann Ainsley (m. 1854)
- Children: 7

William Alexander Mouat (9 April 1821 – 11 April 1871) was a British seafarer. Born in London, he spent much of his career with the Hudson's Bay Company in British Columbia on the west coast of Canada. He became master of several merchant ships including the Otter and the Labouchere. His last posting was at Fort Rupert where he died in a canoe accident. He was married to Mary Ann Ainsley and they had eight children.

== Early life ==
William Alexander Mouat was baptised on 1 July 1821 in Eastcheap, in the City of London. He was born into a seafaring family. His father William Mouat – born 1774 in Kirkwall, Orkney – was a master mariner and later a coal merchant and a coal meter in the City of London. William Alexander's mother was Elizabeth Ingles born 1796 in East London. He had two older siblings: Elizabeth Ann Mouat who married John Edward Foster, a master mariner, and John Ingles Mouat who, according to a statement by his great nephew, drowned at sea off the coast of Madagascar. Captain Foster and his wife Elizabeth Ann were early settlers in New Zealand.

William Alexander Mouat began his sailing career as an apprentice in 1835 at the age of 14. In 1844, he served as second mate of the Hudson's Bay Company steam bark Vancouver under the command of Captain Andrew Cook Mott. He sailed to North America and arrived in Fort Vancouver, in what is now Washington state and then the "capital" of the Hudson's Bay Company's Columbia District, on 27 March 1845. From 28 April 1845 until the end of February 1847 he was first officer of the Cadboro under Captain James Scarborough. In 1848 he acted as a pilot on the Columbia River and in early 1849 he was master of a Californian ship.

== The Mary Dare ==
Later in 1849 he served as first officer of the Mary Dare, again under James Scarborough. In the summer of 1849 he was at Beaver Harbour, British Columbia, where Captain William Henry McNeill of the SS Beaver was establishing Fort Rupert, British Columbia. On 30 July 1849 Charles Beardmore of the Hudson's Bay Company reported to Dr William Fraser Tolmie that Scarborough had kept Mouat "under arrest during his whole stay here" and that by 25 July Mouat had been "so driven and bullied that he left the ship putting himself under Captain McNeill's protection". Scarborough then "declared him as a deserter and broke open his chest and proceeded to the extremity of the law… We shall be anxious to hear how it is settled as this officer is a favourite with us all".

Presumably the Hudson's Bay Company exonerated William Mouat as in 1850 he became master of the Mary Dare. On 28 November 1851 the Beaver, under the command of Captain Charles E Stuart towed the Mary Dare, under William Mouat's command, to Budd Inlet, on which the American Olympia custom-house was situated. The customs inspectors reported that the Mary Dare had a packet of refined sugar on board weighing two hundred and thirty pounds in violation of American laws which stated that refined sugar cannot be imported in packages of less than six hundred pounds. Beaver had on board "a quantity of Indian trading goods not upon the manifest, to the value of $500; also that both vessels before reaching the port of entry, had anchored at Fort Nisqually for fifteen hours; that six passengers and their baggage had been landed without permit". Charles Stuart fled in a canoe to avoid being prosecuted for the infringement. After a court case and the payment of customs duties by the Hudson's Bay Company the two ships were released.

This was one incident in several concerning disputes over the territorial boundaries between Canada and America. These territorial disputes eventually led to the Pig War between America and England – a conflict started by the shooting of a pig.

In 1854 the Mary Dare was due for renewal of her twelve-year registration and as no facilities existed for her inspection in British Columbia, William Mouat took her back to England. He left Victoria in December 1853 and arrived in London on 27 May 1854. During the voyage he was accused by his first officer, Mr Williams, of disgraceful conduct in making a physical assault on the second officer of the Mary Dare in the presence of the crew. The outcome of the accusation is unknown.

The Governor and committee of the Hudson's Bay Company paid him a £100 bonus for safe delivery of the vessel.

== Marriage ==
Whilst in England, on 8 August 1854, he married Mary Ann Ainsley at St Dunstan's, Stepney, East London. Mary's father was a master mariner from Tyneside and at least three captains attended their marriage – William Alexander's father William Mouat, his father-in-law Matthew Ainsley and his brother-in-law John Foster. William Alexander and his new wife left England on 1 September 1854 and travelled back to Victoria as passengers on the Marquis of Bute. Fellow passengers included the Reverend Edward Cridge, chaplain to the Hudson's Bay Company and his new wife also called Mary. Mary Ann Mouat was described as "a gentle, educated lady" and "an accomplished musician … who brought her piano with her on the ship". They arrived back in Victoria on 1 April 1855. William and Mary Mouat had eight children between 1855 and 1867.

Edward Cridge became dean of the Anglican cathedral in Victoria, British Columbia, and later withdrew with about three hundred and fifty of his congregation (of whom William Mouat was one) and joined the Reformed Episcopal Church. Cridge was consecrated a bishop in 1876.

== The Labouchere ==
The Hudson's Bay Company gave William Mouat command of the Otter on 16 April 1854, appointed him as a chief trader on 27 February 1860 and made him master of the Enterprise on 3 April 1862. Gold was discovered in 1865 on the Big Bend of the Columbia River (the Big Bend Gold Rush) and William Mouat was asked to investigate the possibility of steam navigation on the Kamloops Lake, Shuswap Lake and the Thompson River between the lakes. His findings were favorable and the Hudson's Bay Company built the steamship Marten at Savona's Ferry, British Columbia on the Thompson River at the west end of Kamloops Lake.

In 1866 The Hudson's Bay Company won the contract for taking mail between Victoria and San Francisco. William Mouat, "one of the most careful and reliable men that ever handled a wheel", was given command of the Labouchere, which he took to San Francisco on 15 February 1866 to be fitted out for the accommodation of passengers. The British Colonist newspaper reported "The steamer Labouchere, under the command of Captain Mouat, the popular captain of the Enterprise, is announced to sail for San Francisco direct, carrying Her Majesty's mails under the new contract, on the 15th instant".

The Labouchere left San Francisco, after her refit, at six o'clock in the evening on 14 April 1866 in thick and foggy weather. She struck rocks off Point Reyes. After several hours trying to pump the water out, Captain Mouat issued the order to abandon ship. After all the available boats were launched eighteen men were left on board. Captain Mouat addressed them: "Gentlemen, we are now on a sinking ship without boats. Let us do something to save our lives". Accordingly, they began to make rafts. Captain Mouat produced some cigars and remarked that "if they had to go down, they might as well go down smoking". Before the ship sank the men were rescued by the sailing ship Andrew.

William Mouat had displayed "admirable coolness, bravery and forethought" in saving his passengers but the official enquiry censured him for "very gross negligence…in not swinging the Labouchere to ascertain the deviation of the compasses before leaving San Francisco the steering apparatus having been shifted from aft forward" during the refit, and also for not having taken sufficient care of Her Majesty's mail.

== Death ==
William Mouat now took command of the Marten which became the first steamer to ply the Thompson River making her maiden trip on 26 May 1866. However, the Big Bend mines were a failure and the Marten was laid up. William Mouat was posted to Fort Rupert, British Columbia, where he remained in charge until his death on 11 April 1871 while on a canoe trip from Knight Inlet to the fort. He was buried in Victoria, and his tombstone can still be seen in Pioneer Square, adjoining Christ Church Cathedral.

William Mouat was survived by seven of his children and by his wife Mary Ann (who died 1 July 1896). One of their daughters, Ethel Margaret, married Dr James Douglas Helmcken, grandson of Sir James Douglas, colonial governor of Vancouver Island and British Columbia. William and Mary Ann Mouat are commemorated in Victoria. The Fort Victoria Brick Project has outlined the boundaries of the original fort with a double row of bricks, each engraved with the name of a pioneer.
