= Vega Productions =

Vega Productions, Inc.
- Vega Productions, Inc. official logo

Background information
- Origin: Owatonna, Minnesota, USA
- Years active: 2005–present
- Board members: Mark Gehring, Karrisa Gehring, Jason Fladager, Tim Peters, Christopher Pyle

Vega Productions, Inc. is an American music and art education group based near Minneapolis, Minnesota. The group is a 501(c)(3) registered non-profit organization, which works to promote music and art education in the Minnesota public school system, with concerts, albums and events for public schools

== Charity events ==
Events that the group has produced include the Yggdrasil Festival, which featured Karl Denson's Tiny Universe, and was held at Harmony Park in Geneva, Minnesota in August 2005. A Night for Lyndale Elementary was held at the First Avenue on March 14, 2008, and featured music by local artists including Pert Near Sandstone, God Johnson, Down Lo and The Pistol Whippin' Party Penguins, and as guest speakers U.S. Senator Amy Klobuchar and Minnesota State Senator Linda Berglin. News anchor Robyne Robinson hosted the night and over $15,000.00 was raised and used to purchase musical instruments for the students of Lyndale Elementary. Rock The Boat was held on St. Paul's Harriet Island on August 15, 2008, and featured a cruise aboard two connected Padelford Packet River Boats, The Betsy and Anson Northrup, with 2 stages and 4 bands including The Big Wu. Rock The Boat raised over $15,000.00 and Vega Productions donated 37 instruments along with a $1,000.00 check for Linwood/Monroe's art department. Other activities in 2008 included a donation to Albert Lea High School and the formation of a partnership with Schmitt Music to conduct a statewide instrument drive to support Anthony Middle School in South Minneapolis. Rock the Boat II was held on August 15 and featured Minneapolis bands The Big Wu, Pert Near Sandstone, White Iron Band, Heatbox, The Common Man Dan Cole and keyboardist Bernie Worrell. The event generated a $25,000.00 donation of music instruments and supplies to Maxfield Magnet Elementary School. Minnesota Beatle Project Vol. I is a charitable project produced by Vega Productions. 89.3 The Current, McNally Smith College of Music, Pachyderm Studio, Schmitt Music and others contributed to the production and promotion of the benefit album that features Minnesota musicians performing Beatles' songs, with all proceeds used to fund music and art education in the Minnesota public school system.
