= List of shipwrecks in May 1843 =

The list of shipwrecks in May 1843 includes ships sunk, foundered, wrecked, grounded, or otherwise lost during May 1843.

== 1 May ==
List of shipwrecks: 1 May 1843
Ship	State	Description
Amelie	France	The ship was driven ashore 2 leagues (6 nautical miles (11 km) south west of Cette, Hérault. She was on a voyage from Montevideo, Uruguay to Cette.
Chevalier Fleury	France	The ship was wrecked near Cette.
Indus	United Kingdom	The ship ran aground on the Scroby Sands, Norfolk. She was on a voyage from Hartlepool, County Durham to London. She was refloated and resumed her voyage.

== 2 May ==
List of shipwrecks: 2 May 1843
Ship	State	Description
Dora	United Kingdom	The ship was driven ashore at Wexford. She was on a voyage from Newport, Monmouthshire to Wexford.
Elizabeth	United Kingdom	The ship was wrecked on St. Paul Island, Nova Scotia, British North America. Her crew were rescued. She was on a voyage from Liverpool, Lancashire to Quebec City, Province of Canada, British North America.
Elsje Poljce	Netherlands	The ship struck the Brisons and was consequently beached in Whitesand Bay. She was on a voyage from Cardiff, Glamorgan, United Kingdom to Rotterdam, South Holland. She was later refloated.

== 3 May ==
List of shipwrecks: 3 Mary 1843
Ship	State	Description
John Jardine	United Kingdom	The ship was driven ashore at Saint John, New Brunswick, British North America. She was on a voyage from Saint John to Liverpool, Lancashire. She was refloated on 8 May and taken into Portland for repairs.

== 4 May ==
List of shipwrecks: 4 May 1843
Ship	State	Description
Eliza	United States	The brig collided with Avon (United Kingdom) and was abandoned in the Atlantic Ocean (43°30′N 17°13′W). All thirteen people on board were rescued by Avon. Eliza was on a voyage from Faial Island, Azores to Savannah, Georgia.
Hope	United Kingdom	The ship ran aground and was damaged at Plymouth, Devon.
Lancet	United Kingdom	The brig was driven ashore at Absecon, New Jersey, United States.
HDMS St. Jan	Royal Danish Navy	The ship sprang a leak in the Øresund. The leak was repaired, but she subsequently sprang another leak off Flekkerøy, Norway. Consequently decommissioned on 26 Jund and scrapped.
Tay	United Kingdom	The ship was driven ashore near Shippegan Harbour, New Brunswick, British North America. She was on a voyage from South Shields, County Durham to Miramichi, New Brunswick. She was refloated on 23 June and put under repair.

== 5 May ==
List of shipwrecks: 5 May 1843
Ship	State	Description
Briton	United Kingdom	The ship ran aground off Crosby, Lancashire. She was o a voyage from Liverpool, Lancashire to Rio de Janeiro, Brazil. She was refloated and resumed her voyage.
Maria	Russian Empire	The ship was holed by ice and capsized at "Tolbeacon", Sweden. Her crew were rescued. She was on a voyage from Messina, Sicily to Saint Petersburg. She was driven ashore and wrecked before 15 May.
Perseverance	(United Kingdom of Great Britain and Ireland) New South Wales	The cutter was wrecked on the South Reef, off Sydney Heads. She was on a voyage from Sydney to Kiama.
Sarah Crisp	United Kingdom	The ship ran aground at the mouth of the Rangoon River.
Two Brothers	United Kingdom	The ship was driven ashore at Shoreham-by-Sea, Sussex. She was on a voyage from Caernarfon to Shoreham-by-the-Sea. She was refloated on 7 May and taken into Shoreham-by-the-Sea.
Twee Gebroeders	Belgium	The galiot ran aground off Brook, Isle of Wight, United Kingdom. She was on a voyage from Bordeaux, Gironde, France to Brussels. She was refloated and taken into Cowes, Isle of Wight, where she was repaired.

== 6 May ==
List of shipwrecks: 6 May 1843
Ship	State	Description
St. John	United Kingdom	The brig capsized at Swansea, Glamorgan. She was consequently condemned.

== 7 May ==
List of shipwrecks: 7 May 1843
Ship	State	Description
Marie Elise	Bremen	The ship was driven ashore on Süderoog, Duchy of Holstein.

== 8 May ==
List of shipwrecks: 8 May 1843
Ship	State	Description
Amos or Anne	United Kingdom	The ship foundered in the North Sea off Saltfleet, Lincolnshire. Her crew were rescued.
Robert	United Kingdom	The collier, a full-rigged ship, struck the Sizewell Bank, in the North Sea off the coast of Suffolk and was wrecked. Her crew survived.

== 9 May ==
List of shipwrecks: 9 May 1843
Ship	State	Description
Betsey, Sarah	United Kingdom	The ships collided in the North Sea off the coast of Norfolk. Both vessels were consequently beached at Sea Palling. Their crews were rescued. They were each on a voyage from South Shields, County Durham to Rouen, Seine-Inférieure, France.

== 10 May ==
List of shipwrecks: 10 May 1843
Ship	State	Description
Cecile	France	The ship was wrecked at Cape Santa Maria, Portugal. Her crew were rescued. She was on a voyage from Havre de Grâce, Seine-Inférieure to Buenos Aires, Argentina.
Sarah and Ann	United Kingdom	The ship ran aground on the Klein Vogel Sand, in the North Sea. She was refloated the next day and resumed her voyage.
Warwick	United Kingdom	The ship was driven ashore near the Kronstadt Lighthouse, Russia. She was on a voyage from Sunderland, County Durham to Kronstadt. She was refloated and taken into Kronstadt in a leaky condition.

== 11 May ==
List of shipwrecks: 11 May 1843
Ship	State	Description
John N. Gossler	United States	The ship ran aground in the Hooghly River. She was on a voyage from Calcutta, India to Philadelphia, Pennsylvania. She was refloated.
Quebec	United Kingdom	The ship was wrecked on the Red Island Reef, in the Saint Lawrence River.

== 13 May ==
List of shipwrecks: 13 May 1843
Ship	State	Description
Isabella Dick	United Kingdom	The ship was beached at Tobermory, Isle of Mull, Inner Hebrides. She was on a voyage from Inverkeithing, Fife to Malta.
John Hale	United States	The ship departed from Havana, Cuba for Norfolk, Virginia. No further trace, presumed foundered with the loss of all hands.
Regular	United Kingdom	The ship foundered off Mauritius. Her crew were rescued She was on a voyage from London to Bombay, India.
Thomas and Elizabeth	United Kingdom	The ship was wrecked in Sinclair's Bay. Her crew were rescued. She was on a voyage from South Shields, County Durham to Dublin.
William Harris	United Kingdom	The ship was wrecked on the Hobby Reef. She was on a voyage from London to British Honduras.

== 15 May ==
List of shipwrecks: 15 May 1843
Ship	State	Description
Commodore Napier	United Kingdom	The ship ran aground on the London Chest, in the Baltic Sea. She had been refloated by 29 May and taken into Saint Petersburg, Russia.

== 16 May ==
List of shipwrecks: 16 May 1843
Ship	State	Description
Fox	(United Kingdom of Great Britain and Ireland) Van Diemen's Land	The whaler, a brig, was driven ashore and wrecked at George Town. She was refloated and put under repair.
Harmonie	Bremen	The ship was driven ashore on the coast of Friesland, Netherlands. She was on a voyage from Hull, Yorkshire, United Kingdom to Bremen.
Virginia	United States	The packet ship, a brig, was run into off the coast of County Cork, United Kingdom by the schooner Jane (United Kingdom). Her crew were rescued by Jane. She capsized the next day and was driven ashore and wrecked at Derk Cove, near Kinsale, County Cork on 20 May. Virginia was on a voyage from Liverpool, Lancashire, United Kingdom to Boston, Massachusetts.

== 17 May ==
List of shipwrecks: 17 May 1843
Ship	State	Description
Farnacres	United Kingdom	The ship was wrecked on the Norton Sand, in the North Sea off the coast of Suffolk. Her crew were rescued. She was on a voyage from Sunderland, County Durham to London.
Washington	United Kingdom	The schooner was wrecked on the Stony Binks, in the North Sea at the mouth of the Humber. All on board were rescued by the pilot boats № 2 and № 3 (both United Kingdom). Washington was on a voyage from Grangemouth, Stirlingshire to Rotterdam, South Holland, Netherlands.

== 18 May ==
List of shipwrecks: 18 May 1843
Ship	State	Description
Bachelor	United Kingdom	The ship ran aground on the west point of the Île d'Orléans, Province of Canada, British North America. She was refloated the next day.
Tranqueliade	Portugal	The barque was wrecked on Luzon, Spanish East Indies. Her crew were rescued. She was on a voyage from Macao to the Sooloo Islands.
Washington	United Kingdom	The ship was wrecked on the Stoney Binks, in the North Sea off the mouth of the Humber. Her crew were rescued. She was on a voyage from Grangemouth, Stirlingshire to Rotterdam, South Holland, Netherlands.
William Harris	United Kingdom	The ship was wrecked on the Hobby Reef. She was on a voyage from London to British Honduras.

== 19 May ==
List of shipwrecks: 19 May 1843
Ship	State	Description
Ariel	United Kingdom	The ship was driven ashore and sank at Margate, Kent. Her crew were rescued. She was on a voyage from London to Limerick.
Eddystone	United Kingdom	The ship was driven ashore and wrecked at Point May, Newfoundland, British North America. Her crew were rescued. She was on a voyage from Liverpool, Lancashire to Quebec City, Province of Canada, British North America.

== 20 May ==
List of shipwrecks: 20 May 1843
Ship	State	Description
Lady Harvey	United Kingdom	The ship was driven ashore near Shippegan, New Brunswick, British North America. She was refloated.
Lucy	United Kingdom	The ship was driven ashore at Swanage, Dorset.
Mary Jane	United Kingdom	The ship sprang a leak and was beached in Ballycotton Bay. Her crew were rescued. she was on a voyage from Newport, Monmouthshire to Cork. Mary Jane was refloated on 28 May and taken into Cork.

== 21 May ==
List of shipwrecks: 21 May 1843
Ship	State	Description
Atlas	United Kingdom	The ship collided with Marion (United Kingdom) and sank in the River Thames at Gravesend, Kent. Atlas was on a voyage from South Shields, County Durham to London.
Janet	United Kingdom	The sloop foundered in the North Sea off Leven, Fife with the loss of one of her three crew. She was on a voyage from Newcastle upon Tyne, Northumberland to Leven.
Mercury	United States	The whaler capsized in the Atlantic Ocean with the loss of five of her crew.

== 22 May ==
List of shipwrecks: 22 May 1843
Ship	State	Description
Hamsamalah	India	The ship was driven ashore 12 nautical miles (22 km) north of Coringa with the loss of a crew member.
Hydros	(United Kingdom of Great Britain and Ireland) Ceylon	The ship was driven ashore and wrecked at Colombo. She was on a voyage from Trincomalee to Colombo.
Jubilee	(United Kingdom of Great Britain and Ireland) British North America	The ship was wrecked on Saint Pierre Island. She was on a voyage from Saint John's, Newfoundland to Charlotte Town, Prince Edward Island.
Sarah and Elizabeth	United Kingdom	The whaler was burnt in Coffin's Bay, Timor, by the local pirates.
Union	United Kingdom	The brig foundered at Madras, India.

== 23 May ==
List of shipwrecks: 23 May 1843
Ship	State	Description
Amelia Thompson	United Kingdom	The ship foundered in a squall in the Indian Ocean 80 nautical miles (150 km) east by south of Bombay, India with the loss of seven of her crew.
Isabella	United Kingdom	The ship was run down and sunk in the North Sea off the mouth of the Humber by Itenerant (United Kingdom). Her crew were rescued by Itenerant.
Reward	United Kingdom	The ship foundered in the North Sea 16 nautical miles (30 km) south by west of Inchcape. Her crew survived. She was on a voyage from Dublin to South Shields, County Durham.
Union	United Kingdom	The ship foundered in the Indian Ocean. All on board were rescued by Helen (United Kingdom).

== 24 May ==
List of shipwrecks: 24 May 1843
Ship	State	Description
Flower	United Kingdom	The ship was driven ashore at Dennis Bale Point, Cornwall. She was on a voyage from Polperro, Cornwall to Plymouth, Devon. She was refloated and resumed her voyage.
Triton	United Kingdom	The ship was driven ashore at Flamborough Head, Yorkshire. She was on a voyage from Bridlington, Yorkshire to Sunderland, County Durham. She was refloated.

== 25 May ==
List of shipwrecks: 25 May 1843
Ship	State	Description
Canton	United Kingdom	The ship was run aground on the Beacon Rock Shoal. She was on a voyage from Quebec City, Province of Canada, British North America to Liverpool, Lancashire.
Providence	United Kingdom	The ship ran aground at Grimsby, Lincolnshire. She was on a voyage from Grimsby to London.

== 26 May ==
List of shipwrecks: 26 May 1843
Ship	State	Description
Abigail	United Kingdom	The ship ran aground on the Beeves Rock, in the River Shannon. She was on a voyage from Liverpool, Lancashire to Limerick. She was refloated on 8 June.
Ambassador	United Kingdom	The ship was wrecked on Key Conficio. Her crew were rescued. She was on a voyage from Nuevitas, Cuba to Halifax, Nova Scotia, British North America.
Granville	United Kingdom	The ship was wrecked on Key Conficios. Her crew were rescued. She was on a voyage from Nuevitas to Halifax.
Hero of Malown	United Kingdom	The ship was wrecked on the Malabar Coast of India. She was on a voyage from Cochin to Cannonore.
Lequietiano	Spain	The ship was wrecked on the Caracole Shoals, off Saint Domingo. Her crew were rescued. She was on a voyage from Santander to St. Jago de Cuba, Cuba.

== 27 May ==
List of shipwrecks: 27 May 1843
Ship	State	Description
Lord Sydenham; Queen	(United Kingdom of Great Britain and Ireland) British North America	The steamships collided in the Saint Lawrence River downstream of Machiche, Province of Canada. Both vessels sank with the loss of two lives on each ship.
Thomas Rickinson	United Kingdom	The brig was wrecked on a reef off Poudre d'Or, Mauritius. Her crew were rescued. She was on a voyage from Mauritius to London.
Tom Moore	United Kingdom	The ship was wrecked on the White Island Reef. All on board were rescued. She was on a voyage from Sligo to Quebec City, Province of Canada, British North America.
Vienna	Kingdom of Lombardy–Venetia	The ship ran aground and sank in the Adriatic Sea with the loss of several lives. She was on a voyage from Vienna to Bratislava, Austrian Empire.

== 28 May ==
List of shipwrecks: 28 May 1843
Ship	State	Description
Isabella Anderson	United Kingdom	The ship ran aground on the Herd Sand, in the North Sea off the coast of County Durham. She was on a voyage from Inverness to South Shields, County Durham.

== 29 May ==
List of shipwrecks: 29 May 1843
Ship	State	Description
O. C. Raymond	United Kingdom	The ship departed from Chusan, China for Macao. No further trace, presumed foundered with the loss of all hands.
Patriot	(United Kingdom of Great Britain and Ireland) Jersey	The ship ran aground on the Scroby Sands, Norfolk and was abandoned by her crew. She was on a voyage from Gallipoli, Ottoman Empire to Hull, Yorkshire. Patriot was reboarded the next day and towed into Great Yarmouth, Norfolk.

== 30 May ==
List of shipwrecks: 30 May 1843
Ship	State	Description
Albion	United Kingdom	The ship was wrecked on Inchkeith. She was on a voyage from Leith, Lothian to Rotterdam, South Holland, Netherlands.
Aurora	United States	The barque was driven ashore at Buenos Aires, Argentina.
Brilliante	Kingdom of Sardinia	The brig was driven ashore at Buenos Aires.
Celerity	United Kingdom	The ship ran aground on The Shingles, off the Isle of Wight. She was on a voyage from Southampton, Hampshire to Penzance, Cornwall.
Harriet	United Kingdom	The ship was driven ashore at the mouth of the Palmones. She was on a voyage from Algiers, Algeria to Quebec City, Province of Canada, British North America. She was refloated and taken into Algeceiras Bay.
Jeune Estelle	France	The brig was driven ashore at Buenos Aires.
Marco Polo	Belgium	The ship was damaged in a gale at Bueno Aires. She was consequently condemned.
Oswego	United States	The brig was driven aground at Buenos Aires.

== Unknown date ==
List of shipwrecks: Unknown date in May 1843
Ship	State	Description
Abigail	United Kingdom	The ship ran aground in the River Shannon. She was on a voyage from Liverpool, Lancashire to Limerick. She was refloated on 29 May and taken into Limerick.
Adventurer	United Kingdom	The ship was wrecked in Sandown Bay, Cape Colony. She was on a voyage from Sandown Bay to Algoa Bay.
Ariel	United Kingdom	The ship was driven ashore and wrecked at Margate, Kent before 21 May.
Athenais	France	The ship capsized whilst on a voyage from Nantes, Loire-Inférieure to Cette, Hérault. She was taken into the Bay of Bourgneuf on 27 May in a capsized condition.
Chance	United Kingdom	The ship was wrecked in the Swan River before 31 May. She was on a voyage from Java, Netherlands East Indies to the Swan River Colony.
Concord	United Kingdom	The ship was in collision with Ebenezar (United Kingdom and foundered.
Eliza and Ellen	United Kingdom	The ship departed from London in late May. No further trace, presumed foundered with the loss of all hands.
Industry	(United Kingdom of Great Britain and Ireland) British North America	The ship was wrecked on Partridge Island. She was on a voyage from Halifax, Nova Scotia to Saint John, New Brunswick.
Orb	United States	The ship was wrecked on the Man of War Shoals before 23 May. She was on a voyage from Jamaica to New York.
Pathfinder	United Kingdom	The ship ran aground on St James' and Marys' Lump, in the Hooghly River. She was on a voyage from Calcutta, India to London.
Phoebe	United Kingdom	The ship was wrecked at Aberdyfi, Merionethshire before 17 May.
Racer	United Kingdom	The ship was wrecked on the Bare Bush Keys, off the coast of Jamaica before 29 May. Her crew were rescued. She was on a voyage from Jamaica to Veracruz, Mexico.
Resolution	United Kingdom	The ship ran aground and sank in the Hooghly River. She was on a voyage from Calcutta to a port in Arracan. She was refloated on 7 May.
Sarah	United Kingdom	The ship was departed from Arakan for Penang, Malaya. No further trace, presumed foundered with the loss of all hands.
Thompson	United Kingdom	The ship was wrecked in the Crooked Island Passage, Bahamas.
Tres Irmaos	Portugal	The ship foundered off Socotra, Mahra Sultanate with the loss of 25 of the 40 people on board. She was on a voyage from Mozambique to Bombay, India.
Vigilant	United Kingdom	The ship was abandoned in the Indian Ocean off Madagascar before 8 May. Three crew were rescued by Rodolphe ( (France) Île Bourbon). Vigilant was on a voyage from Marseille, Bouches-du-Rhône to Île Bourbon. She came ashore on Madagascar in early July and was wrecked.
Zakrewsky	(Russian Empire) Grand Duchy of Finland	The ship was lost off Saaremaa before 18 May. She was on a voyage from St. Ubes, Portugal to Oulu.
