= Fort Garry (disambiguation) =

Fort Garry may refer to the following places located in the Canadian province of Manitoba:

- Fort Garry (or Upper Fort Garry), a former Hudson's Bay Company trading post located at present-day downtown Winnipeg
- Lower Fort Garry, its mate, on the Red River near Lockport, Manitoba
- Fort Garry, Winnipeg, a former town, now a district within the city of Winnipeg
  - Fort Garry (electoral district), a provincial electoral constituency
  - Winnipeg—Fort Garry, a former federal electoral district

== See also ==
- The Fort Garry Horse Canadian armoured regiment
- Fort Garry Hotel, a hotel in downtown Winnipeg
- Fort Garry Brewing Company
- Fort Garry (1920 HBC vessel), built in 1920, in Little Brook, Nova Scotia
