= Chastity Brown =

American musician (born 1982)

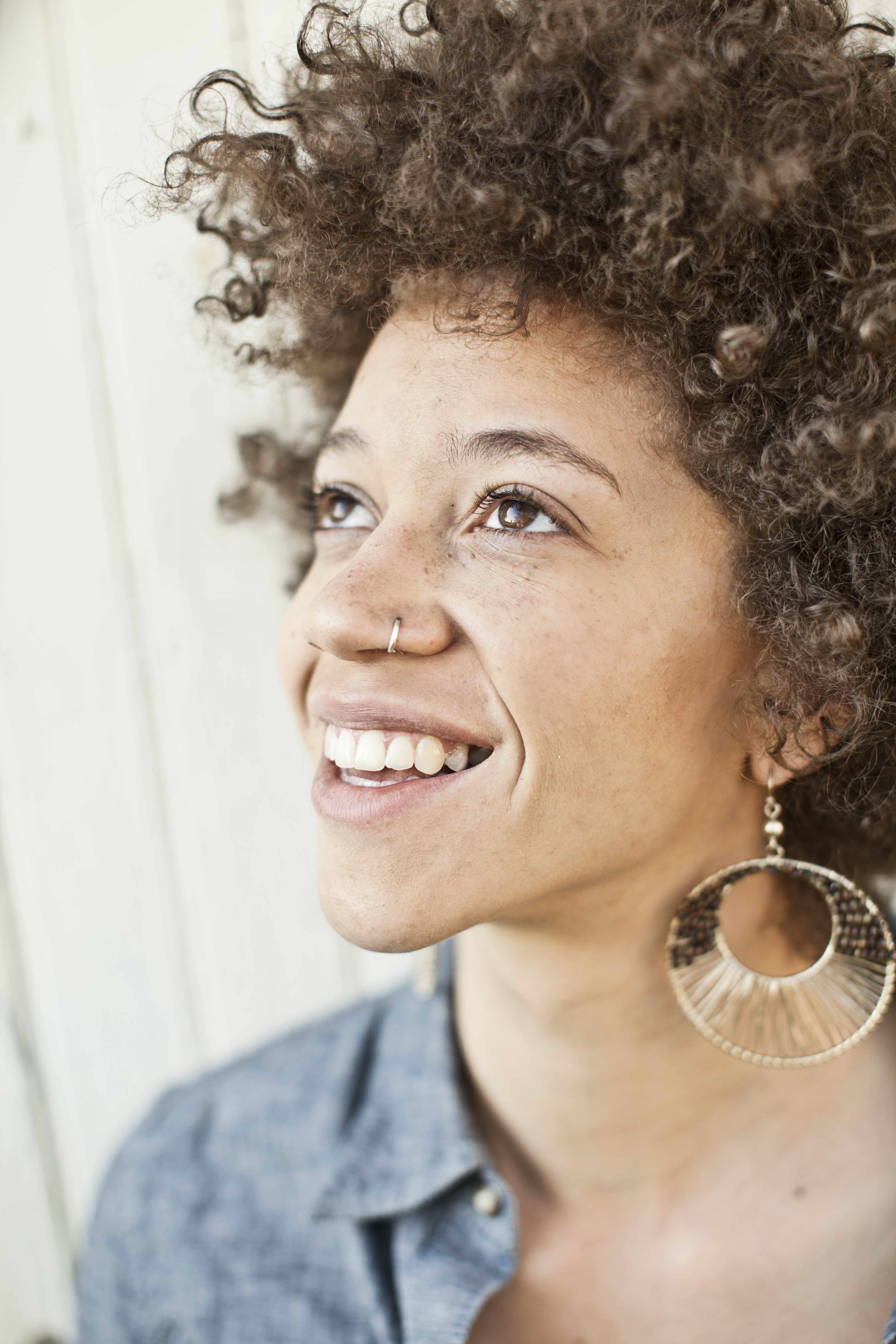

Background information
- Born: June 1, 1982 (age 44)
- Origin: Union City, Tennessee, United States
- Genres: Americana, blues, folk, jazz, soul, rock
- Occupations: Singer-songwriter, musician
- Instruments: Vocals, guitar, banjo, piano, saxophone
- Label: Red House Records
- Members: Robert Mulrennan, DeVon Gray, Jef Sundquist, Greg Schutte
- Website: chastitybrownmusic.com

Chastity Brown (born June 1, 1982) is an American singer-songwriter and musician based out of Minneapolis, Minnesota. Critics have dubbed her "a banjo-playing soul-singer" and "a rocking, rolling encyclopedia of roots music."

== Biography and music career ==
Raised in Union City, Tennessee, Chastity grew up playing the saxophone and drums in church before she started to write and sing her own songs. She performed her first show in Knoxville, Tennessee before moving to Minneapolis in 2006. Brown self-released her debut album Do the Best You Can in 2007 and follow-up, Sankofa in 2009. Both were met with critical acclaim. Music critic Jim Walsh of the Star Tribune commented, "...for those who appreciate songwriter-fueled jazz and a sense of organic greatness in the making, she is nothing short of a massage therapist for the ears and soul."

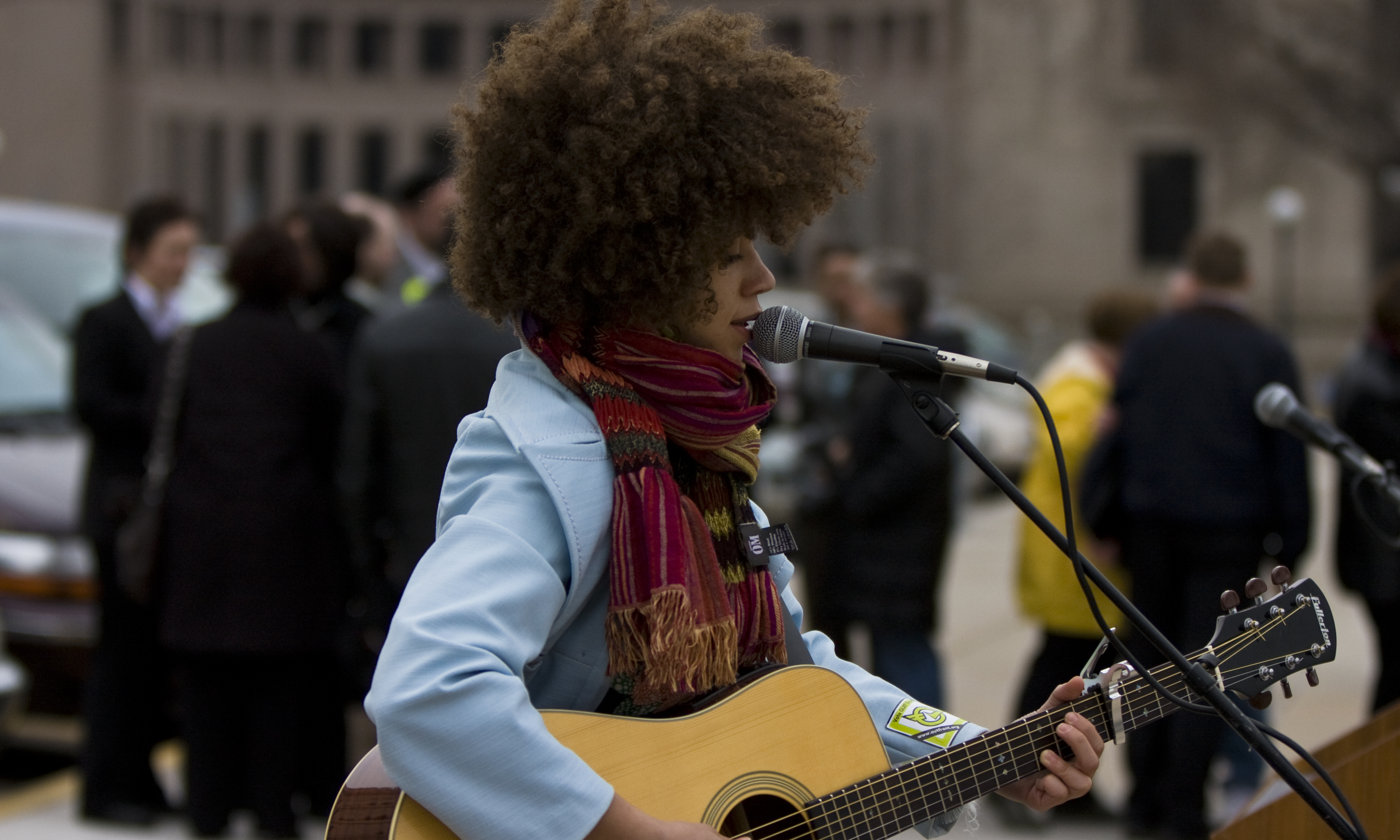
Chastity Brown in 2008

She released her 2010 album High Noon Teeth with bandmates, Michael X. (percussion), Adam Wozniak (of Dark Dark Dark, upright bass) and Nikki Schultz (backing vocals). Brown's song "By the Train Tracks" was 89.3 The Current's "Song of the Day" on June 6, 2010.

In October 2011, Chastity Brown was discovered by Fred Cannon SVP of BMI at the Bitter End. He introduced her to Rose Drake, who signed her to Creative and Dreams Music Network. Cannon brought in Paul Buono to produce with him "a classic record, that will be memorable and will put Chasity Brown on the map." In 2012, she released Back-Road Highways on Creative and Dreams Music Network, based out of Nashville, Tennessee. Musicians include Chastity's long-time guitar player, Robert Mulrennan, along with Blair Masters on B-3 organ, Anton Nesbitt on bass, and Bernard Bell on drums. She was chosen as Minneapolis' Best Folk Artist in early 2012 before garnering nods from NPR as a "promising new voice," and best album nods from 89.3 The Current, Star Tribune, City Pages, and Lavender Magazine. She toured Europe for the first time that same year and sold out her first two shows in Kiel, Germany. While touring with Back-Road Highways, she supported Michael Kiwanuka, Dar Williams, Raul Midon, and Leon Russell.

Chastity's hit single, "After You" landed on 89.3 The Current's Top 89 Songs of 2012, and was also featured in the BBC & HBO television movie, Mary & Martha, starring Hilary Swank. After seeing Chastity's performance of "After You" at the Americana Music Festival in Nashville, CMT highlighted it as a Top Ten Moment of the 2012 festival, stating "she's definitely a songwriter and performer to watch."

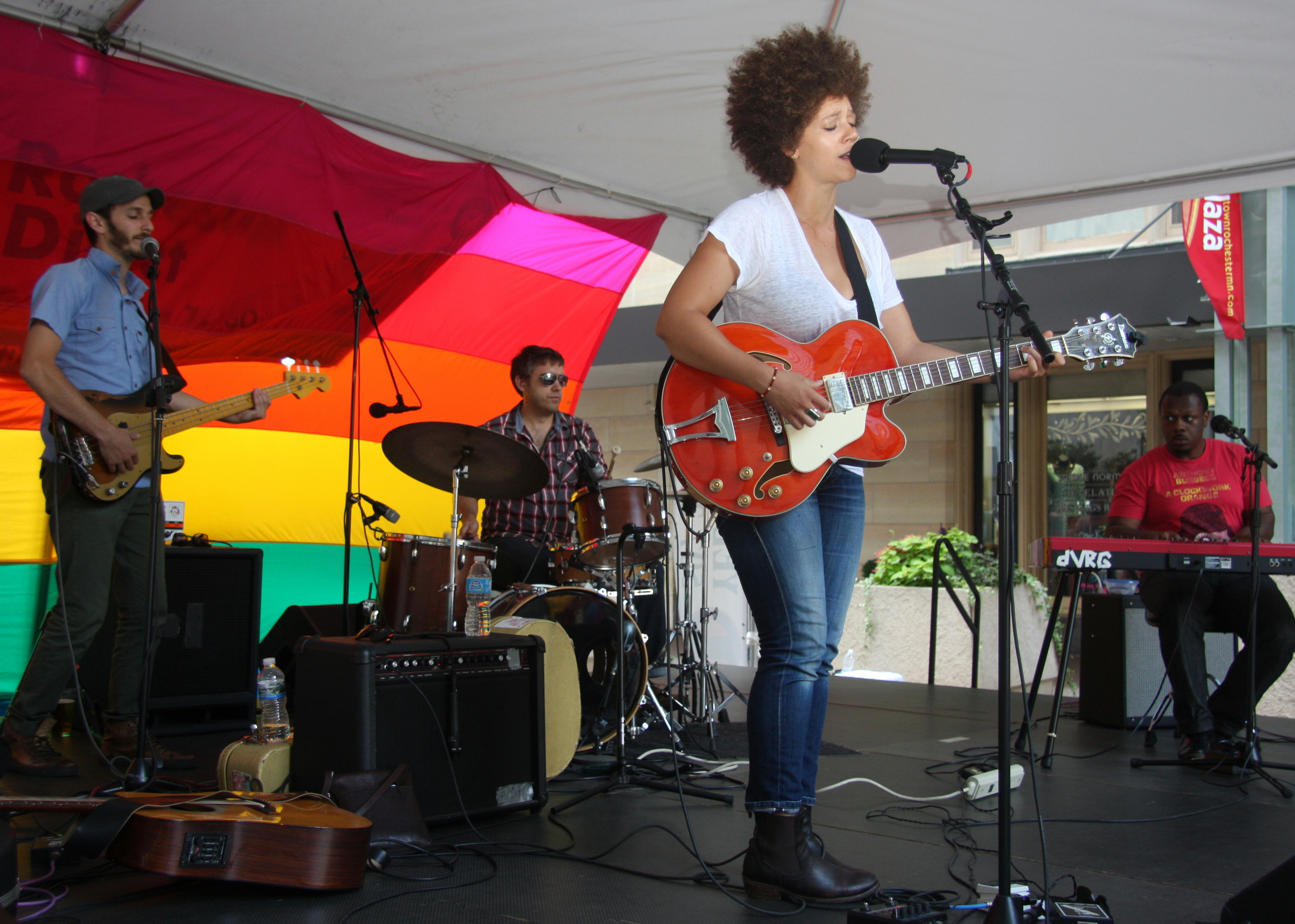
Chastity Brown and band in 2014

On July 28, 2016, Chastity signed with Red House Records.

== Non-profit contributions ==
Brown is involved in a number of nonprofit and charitable events around the Twin Cities. She was a contributing artist to the 2012 album Think Out Loud: Music Serving the Homeless in the Twin Cities, and has performed at events for nonprofits promoting youth access to the arts, including Vega Productions, Inc., and Free Arts Minnesota, among others.

== Discography ==
=== Studio albums ===
- Do the Best You Can (2007)
- Sankofa (2009)
- High Noon Teeth (2010)
- Back-Road Highways (2012)
- Long Way (2014)
- Silhouette of Sirens (2017)
- Sing to the Walls (2022)
