= City of Winnipeg =

City of Winnipeg may refer to:

- Winnipeg, a city in Manitoba, Canada
  - Government of Winnipeg
- City of Winnipeg (HBC vessel), a steamship that operated on rivers in the Canadian prairies
