= Eddystone (ship) =

Several ships have been named Eddystone, initially for the Eddystone Rocks:

- Eddystone (1802 ship) (or Eddistone) was launched at Kingston-upon-Hull. She then sailed for the North West Company. The French Navy captured her in 1806 but an armed ship of the Royal Navy recaptured her within weeks. She next sailed for the Hudson's Bay Company (HBC) from 1807 to about 1824. She then traded generally until May 1843 when she was wrecked.
- Eddystone, of 233 tons (bm) was launched at Hull in 1809 and was last listed in 1811.
- Eddystone, of 950 tons, was launched in 1856 at Newburyport
- Eddystone, of 1,550 GRT, was launched in 1927 for the Clyde Shipping Co. From 11 June 1943 she sailed as a convoy rescue ship. She sailed with 24 convoys and rescued 64 survivors. In 1948 she became Brookmount. She was broken up in 1959.
- MV Eddystone (2002) was launched by Flensburger Schiffbau as one of six roll-on/roll-off Point-class sealift ships whose construction the British Ministry of Defence financed so that they would be available for use as naval auxiliaries when needed.
