= Prince of Wales (1793 ship) =

Ship of the Hudson's Bay Company

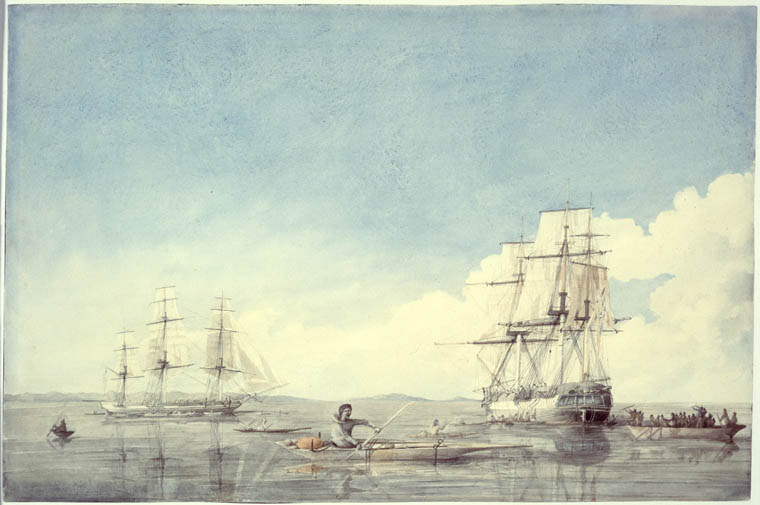
- The Hudson's Bay Company ships Prince of Wales and Eddystone bartering with the Inuit off the Upper Savage Islands, Hudson Strait; by Robert Hood (1819)

History

Great Britain
- Name: Prince of Wales
- Operator: Hudson's Bay Company
- Builder: Randall & Brent, Rotherhithe
- Launched: 1793
- Fate: Wrecked 12 June 1849

General characteristics
- Tons burthen: 342, or 351, or 380, or 840 (Note: This is clearly a mistranscription or a typographical error.) (bm)
- Complement: 36, or 45
- Armament: 16 or 18 × 9-pounder guns + 6 swivel guns

Prince of Wales was launched in 1793, on the Thames. She spent much of her career sailing for the Hudson's Bay Company (HBC). From 1845, she was a Greenland whaler, sailing out of Hull. In 1845 she was the last ship to see Sir John Franklin's expedition to the arctic. She was wrecked on 12 June 1849, in Davis Strait.

== Hudson's Bay Company ==
Prince of Wales had been launched in 1793, for the HBC, and first appeared in Lloyd's Register (LR) with H.Hanwell, master, Hudson's Bay Company, owner, and trade London–Hudson Bay. War with France had just begun and Captain Henry Hanwell acquired a letter of marque on 8 April 1793. Hanwell sailed for Hudson Bay at the end of May, sailing via Stromness. She then sailed between York Factory or Moose Factory and London.

In 1811, Prince of Wales, Eddystone, and Edward and Ann carried immigrants to Hudson Bay.

On 1 June 1813, three merchant vessels sailed from Gravesend, bound for Hudson Bay: Prince of Wales, Eddystone, Ramsay, master, carried employees of the Hudson's Bay Company, and Ann, Neale, master, was taking a party of Moravian missionaries. On 13 June, they sailed from Stromness in the Orkney Islands. There Prince of Wales had embarked 97 settlers for the Red River Colony. HMS Brazen sailed as their escort. On the way fever broke out on Prince of Wales, which resulted in the death of a number of the emigrants. Instead of landing at York Factory, the convoy arrived at Churchill, Manitoba, 100 miles away. They arrived on 19 August, and Brazen left again on 20 September, escorting another convoy to England via the Orkney Islands and arriving at the Downs on 25 November.

In 1816–1817, Prince of Wales overwintered at Charlton Island.

In 1819 Prince of Wales again carried settlers.

On 16 July 1821, Prince of Wales, Eddystone, and Lord Wellington were sailing in company to York Factory in Hudson Bay when they encountered HMS Fury and Hecla at 61°20′N 66°30′W. The two British warships were under the command of Commander William Edward Parry. This was Fury's first Arctic journey, but Parry's second in search of the Northwest Passage.

On 24 July, an iceberg struck Prince of Wales, staving in her starboard side. Eddystone and Lord Wellington narrowly escaped. Prince of Wales began to take on water at an alarming rate. To lighten her, Eddystone took on her cargo. Consequently, the damaged timbers rose above the water line, making temporary repairs possible.

On 24 June 1826, as Prince of Wales was sailing out of Hoy Sound, bound for Hudson Bay, she struck a rock and was stuck there for four hours. She took on so much water she had to return and unload to effect repairs. On 1 July she put into Kirkcaldy for the repairs. On 10 July, she resumed her voyage to Hudson Bay, repairs having been made. She arrived at Hudson Bay on 17 September.

Prince of Wales again overwintered at Charlton Island in 1830–1831. Some of the crew joined Beaver on an expedition to the Ungava Peninsula.

Prince of Wales overwintered at Charlton Island for a third time in 1833–1834.

Disposal: On 23 February 1842, the HBC ordered that Prince of Wales be advertised for sale. She then sold in 1844, to John Chambers, of Kingston upon Hull.

== Northern whaler ==
Prince of Wales then became a Northern Whale Fishery whaler.

Year	Master	Owner	Trade	Source & notes
1844	W.Couldrey	Abbey & Co.	Hull–Davis Strait	LR; small repairs 1835 & 1844
1849	T.Lee	Abbey & Co.	Hull–Davis Strait	LR; small repairs 1844

Prince of Wales, Captain Dannet, master, was the last to see Sir John Franklin's expedition to the Arctic. On 26 July 1845, she was at 74°48′N 66°13′W in Lancaster Sound, Baffin Bay and there saw HMS Erebus and Terror moored to an iceberg.

== Fate ==
On 12 June 1849, Prince of Wales sank in Davis Strait after ice crushed her. Her crew took to her boats, survived, and eventually reached the Orkney Islands.
