= Hadlow (1814 ship) =

History

United Kingdom
- Name: Hadlow
- Owner: W. Parker & Co
- Port of registry: London
- Builder: J. Munn, St. Rocques, Quebec
- Launched: 1814, Quebec
- Fate: Foundered 1823

General characteristics
- Class & type: Full-rigged ship
- Tons burthen: 372, 37232/94, 374, or 376, or 380 (bm)
- Length: 104 ft (32 m)
- Beam: 29 ft (8.8 m)
- Depth of hold: 7 ft (2.1 m)
- Decks: Two decks
- Propulsion: Sails
- Sail plan: Full-rigged ship

Hadlow was a merchant sailing ship built in 1814 at Quebec, British North America. She made two voyages transporting convicts from England and Ireland to Australia. She plied between England, India, and Sierra Leone before being lost with all hands in 1823.

== Construction ==
Hadlow was built for W. Parker & Co.; she was a two-deck full-rigged ship with a coppered hull, she was assessed at around 374 tons (bm).

== History ==
A letter dated 28 April 1815 reported that she had re-registered at London.

Having left London under the command of one Captain Davison on 27 May 1815, Hadlow sailed from Cromarty, Scotland, to the Hudson Bay in June with 34 colonists from Stromness and possibly Loch Eriboll. She arrived in York Factory on 26 August 1815 and left again on 7 September to winter at Strutton Sound. Hadlow arrived back in London on 4 November the following year.

Described as "new built", Hadlow sailed from London for Bengal, India via Madeira, Portugal in February 1817 under the command of Captain Edward Lamb. During the return voyage from Calcutta, Captain Lamb died on 31 December 1817. Command of the ship was taken by Captain Anderson. Hadlow collided with the transport ship Wyton in the English Channel in April 1818. Wyton put in to Portsmouth, Hampshire with the loss of her bowsprit.

Hadlow appears in Lloyd's Register for 1818 with master Lamb, changing to J. Craigie, and trade London—India, changing to London—Botany Bay.

In July 1818, Hadlow was fitted for the transportation of convicts at Deptford Dockyard, Kent. Her guard of a lieutenant and 32 troops of the 48th Regiment of Foot embarked on 17 July, along with six women and four children. She sailed to Woolwich, Kent on 30 July and took 50 male convicts from the prison hulk Justitia on 1 August. The next day, she sailed for Sheerness, Kent where she took 97 convicts from the prison hulks Bellerophon and Retribution.

Hadlow departed from Sheerness for New South Wales on 22 August under the command of Captain John Craigie. (Note: Captain Craigie's surname also appears as "Craige" and "Cragie" in sources. The spelling "Craigie" has been adopted for this article.) Having called in at the Cape of Good Hope en route, she arrived at Port Jackson on 23 December, and her cargo of 149 male convicts were turned over to the authorities there, one having died en route. (Note: The figures don't tally, but are given per sources quoted. Bateson too gives the number of convicts embarked as 150, with one dying en route.) A woman who had been taken on board at the Cape of Good Hope gave birth to a stillborn child shortly after arrival at Port Jackson and subsequently died. The convicts were disembarked on 4 January 1819 for inspection by Governor Macquarie.

Hadlow departed from Sydney, New South Wales for Calcutta, India on or about 20 January 1819. She departed from Calcutta in late May 1819 for London, where she arrived in early December.

Hadlow departed from Deptford on 20 February 1820 for Gravesend, where, on 23 February, she embarked a captain, sergeant and 32 privates of the 48th Regiment. She then sailed to Cobh, County Cork, to collect 150 male convicts, who were embarked on 23 March. Hadlow sailed on 2 April and arrived at Port Jackson on 5 August 1820. Two of her 150 convicts died en route. The convicts were disembarked on 15 August. Hadlow departed from Sydney on 15 September for Batavia, Netherlands East Indies. She returned from Batavia in October 1820 in company with Earl St. Vincent, Mangles and Neptune; between them the four ships had brought 603 convicts to Port Jackson.

Hadlow sailed from London for Bombay, India on or about 10 October 1821. She arrived in April 1822. Hadlow departed from Bombay on 2 June 1822 and arrived in The Downs in mid-October.

In 1823 she underwent a small repair. The Register of Shipping (1824), gave her master's name as Pounder, and her trade as London—Sierra Leone. Hadlow, Pounder, master, sailed from Gravesend for Sierra Leone on 14 March 1823.

While she was at Sierra Leone, yellow fever broke out on Hadlow, killing four of her crew. The disease was brought to Sierra Leone either by the merchant ship Caroline or by USS Cyane. At the time, Hadlow was under the command of Captain Praguel, or Prangnell.

== Fate ==
Hadlow departed for London on 31 August, but subsequently foundered with the loss of all hands. There was a report of her arriving in The Downs on 4 September 1823, but this is clearly an error.
