= Anson Northup (Minnesota politician) =

American politician

- Northup c. 1858

Member of the Minnesota Senate from the 21st District
- In office December 2, 1857 – December 6, 1859

Personal details
- Born: January 4, 1817 Cattaraugus County, New York, U.S.
- Died: March 27, 1894 (aged 77) Saint Paul, Minnesota, U.S.
- Resting place: Lakewood Cemetery

Anson "Anse" Northup (January 4, 1817 – March 27, 1894), also spelled as Anson Northrup, was an American businessman, politician, soldier, ship captain, and early citizen of Stillwater, Minnesota. Northup was the owner and namesake of the paddle steamer Anson Northup which was the first steamboat to navigate the Red River of the North in 1859.

== Early life ==
Northup was born on January 4, 1817 in Cattaraugus County, New York.^{:61} Northup briefly worked on Ohio before moving to Wisconsin Territory in 1839 where he worked as a cowboy moving cattle from the Wisconsin River to the St. Croix River.^{:61}^{:501} Northup eventually moved his family from Ohio to St. Croix Falls, Wisconsin in 1841 where he owned several businesses.^{:61} Northup later moved to Minnesota Territory in the spring of 1844 originally settling in Stillwater, Minnesota but later settling in the state capital of Saint Paul, Minnesota by 1849.^{:61}

== Business ventures ==
=== Hotels ===
Throughout his life Northup owned a series of hotels. Northup's first major business venture was building and operating the Northup House, a rural hotel in Washington County, Minnesota in the spring of 1844.^{:502,526} The Northup House was later destroyed by a fire in 1846.^{:502,529} During this time Northup became the business partner of Socrates Nelson who Northup leased a shanty to Nelson which was used as a general store.^{:109}^{:503}

In 1847 Northup purchased William H. Nobles and H. Walker's interests in the Osceola Lumber Company of Osceola, Wisconsin, Northup sold his interests in the company a year later in 1848 to W. O. Mahoney and W. Kent.^{:279} In 1848 Northup constructed the St. Croix House hotel which was later destroyed by a fire in the 1870's.^{:526}

Northup moved to Saint Paul in 1849 where he built the American Hotel on Third Street near the Seven Corners.^{:61} Northup later moved to St. Anthony, Minnesota in 1851 where he built the St. Charles Hotel, in 1853 Northup constructed the Bushnell Hotel in Minneapolis.^{:61} The Bushnell Hotel was the first brick hotel in Minneapolis.^{:61}

=== Steamboating ===
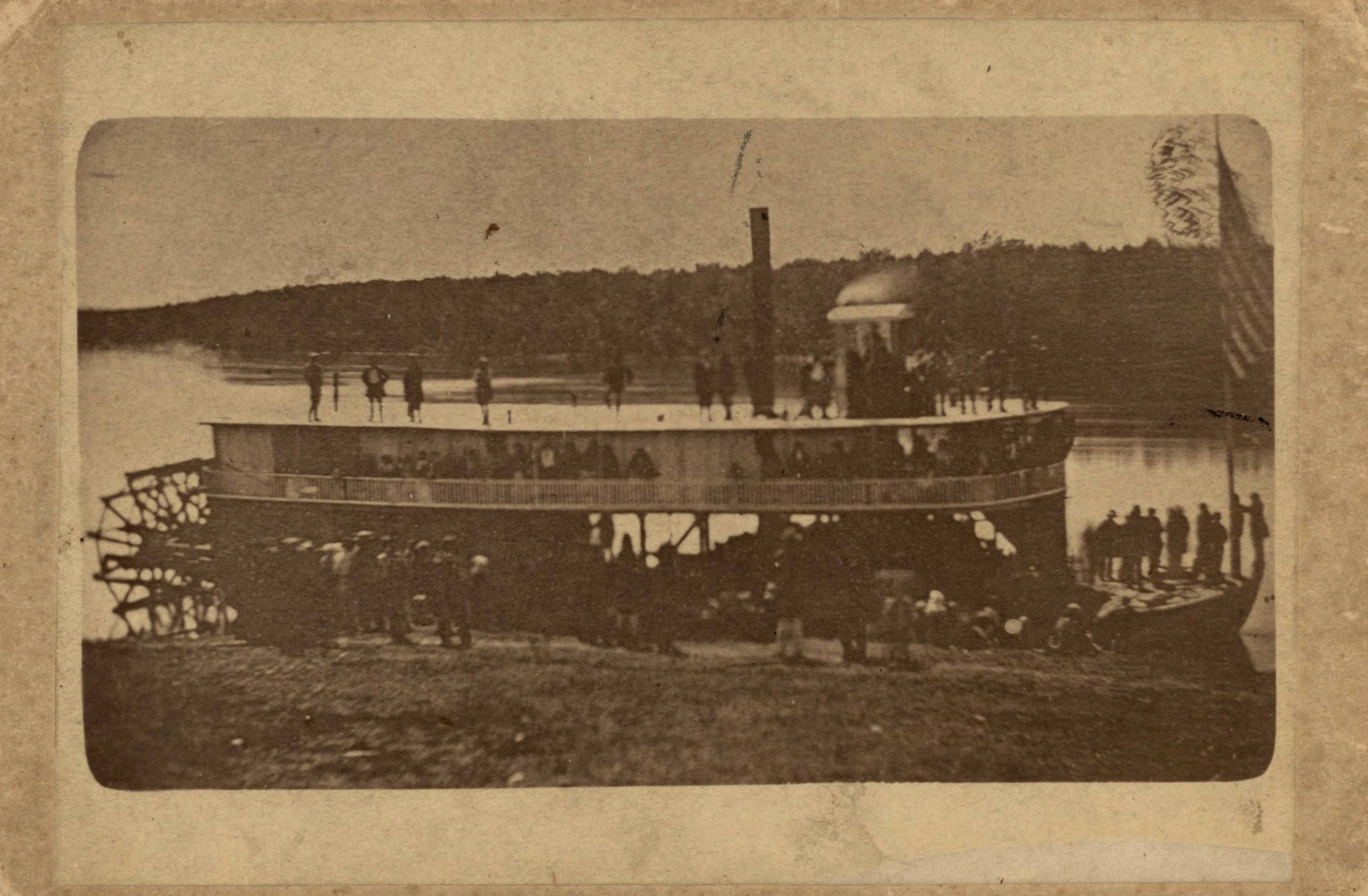
The Anson Northup in 1859

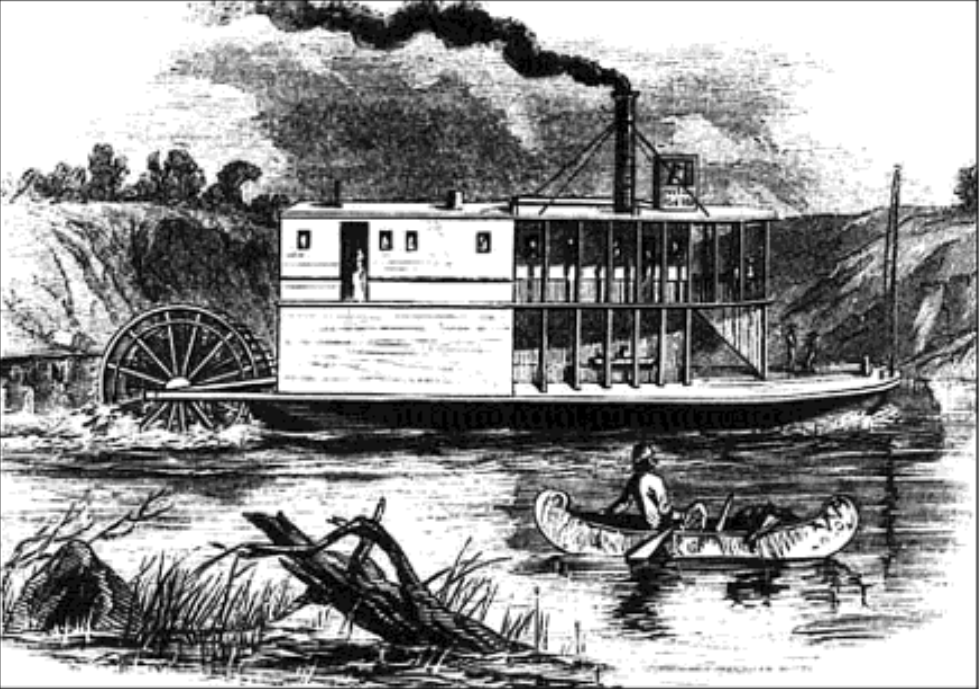
Engraving of the Anson Northup in 1859

In late 1858 the Saint Paul Chamber of Commerce offered $1,000 to any citizen that could put a steamboat on the Red River of the North, the Chamber of Commerce later raised this incentive to $2,000 during the summer of 1859. During the North American fur trade furs and commodities from the Hudson's Bay Company in the Red River Colony and the American Fur Company in the east were transported through Minnesota using Red River carts back and forth to Fort Garry utilizing the Red River trails. The introduction of steamboats to the Red River would increase trade and hasten the shipping of commodities in both Minnesota and Canada.

Northup entered the statewide competition to traverse the Red River by purchasing the paddle steamer North Star in 1858 and renamed it the Anson Northup.^{:339} Northup planned to disassemble and portage the ship across Minnesota from the Crow Wing River during the winter and move it to Pokegama Falls near Grand Rapids, Minnesota.^{:1338} The ship would then be portaged to western Minnesota to modern-day Fargo-Moorhead where it would be reassembled in the spring and transported up the Red River from Fort Abercrombie to Fort Garry in the Red River Colony.

In the spring of 1859 Northup's expedition crew consisted of roughly 44 men, including translator and guide Pierre Bottineau, along with 34 teams of oxen to move the ship's wood, machinery, and boiler which weighed 11,000 pounds (5,000 kg).^{:570} Northup's expedition covered 150 miles (240 km) in 11 days.^{:1338} Northup's expedition was discovered by Randolph M. Probstfield near Detroit Lakes, Minnesota where it was struggling to cross the Otter Tail River due to a combination of deep snow and thawed ice.

The expedition arrived at Fargo-Moorehead at the mouth of the Sheyenne River on April 1 where they began to rebuild the ship, the ship took 6 weeks to reassemble.^{:570} Northup left the Sheyenne River on June 6 and arrived at Fort Garry on June 10, 1859 successfully navigating the Red River to Fort Garry.^{:570} Northup eventually sold the North Star for $8,000 to J.C. Burbank of the Hudson's Bay Company who renamed it Pioneer.^{:570}

== Political career ==
=== Early offices ===
Northup's first elected position was in 1847 as the Road Supervisor of Washington County, Minnesota.^{:322}

=== Minnesota senate ===
Northup was elected to serve a term in the Minnesota Senate on October 13, 1857 representing Minnesota's 21st Senate district. At the time the 21st Senate district consisted of Morrison County, Crow Wing County, and Mille Lacs County.^{:61} Northup served in the 1st Minnesota Legislature from December 2, 1857 to December 6, 1859. During his term he was the chairman of the Agriculture and Manufacturing Committee and Roads and Bridges Committee and was a member of the Elections Committee.

== Military service ==
During the American Civil War Northup volunteered for service in the Union Army. Northup served during the war as the wagon master of the 1st Minnesota Infantry Regiment.^{:819} While on leave in Minnesota in the summer of 1862 the Dakota War of 1862 broke out.^{:819} Northup would participate in the conflict at the Battle of Fort Ridgely where he led a mounted militia unit.^{:1169}

== Later life and legacy ==
Northup later lived in Long Prairie, Minnesota, Swan River, Minnesota, and Duluth, Minnesota before settling again in Saint Paul.^{:61} Northup died on March 27, 1894 in Saint Paul, he is buried in Lakewood Cemetery.

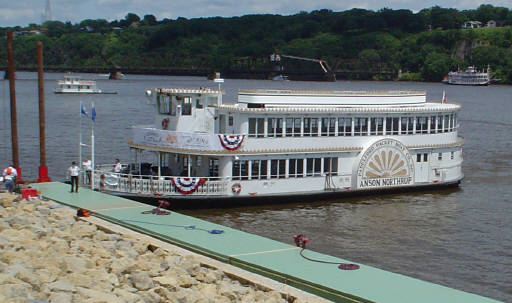
The modern Anson Northup in Dubuque, Iowa

The modern paddle steamer the Anson Northup and its extension, the Betsy Northup, are named in honor of Northup and his wife. The modern boat is owned by the Paddleford Packet Boat Company.
