= Minnesota Centennial Showboat =

Coordinates: 44°56′23″N 93°5′45″W

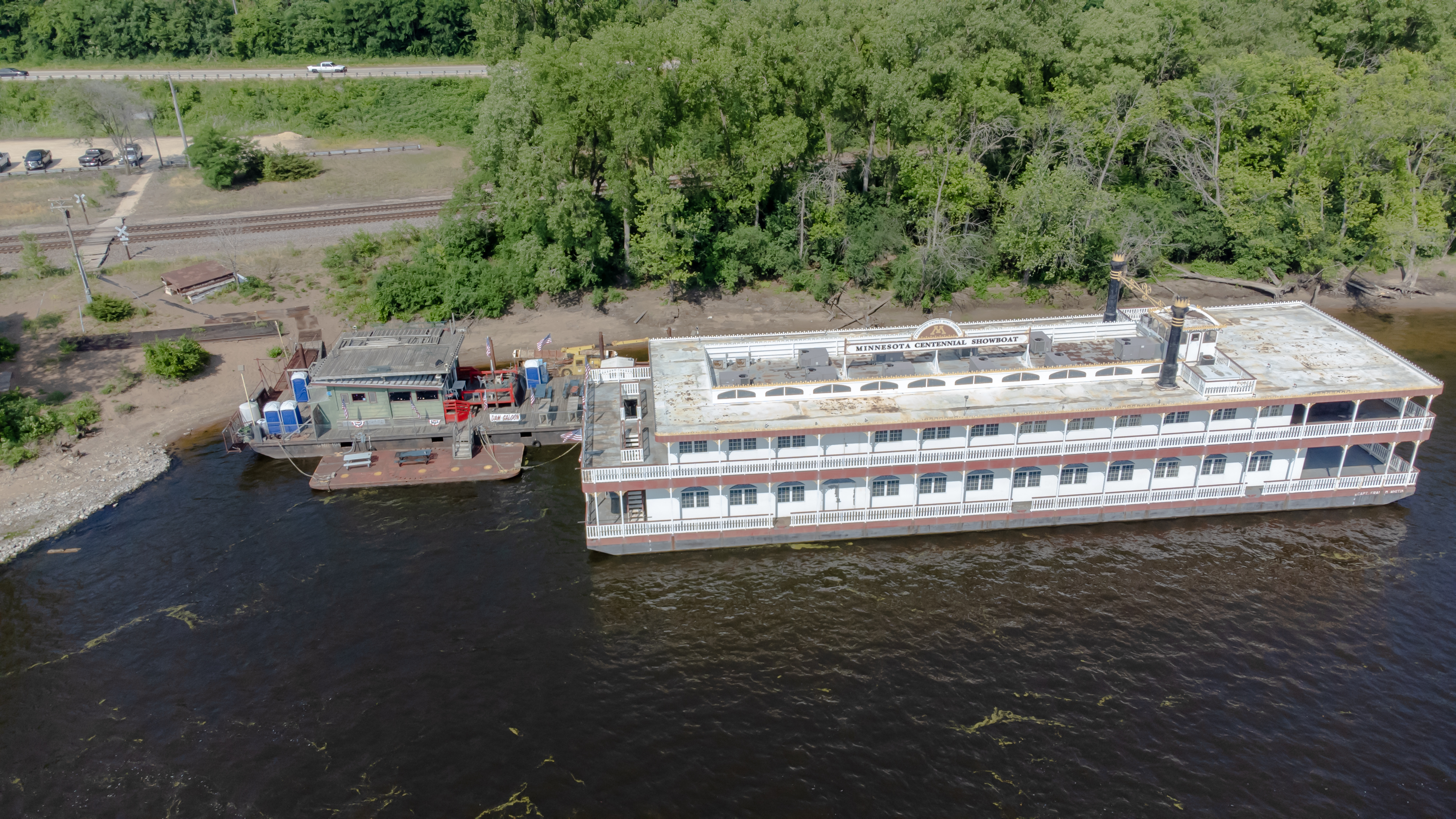
Minnesota Centennial Showboat

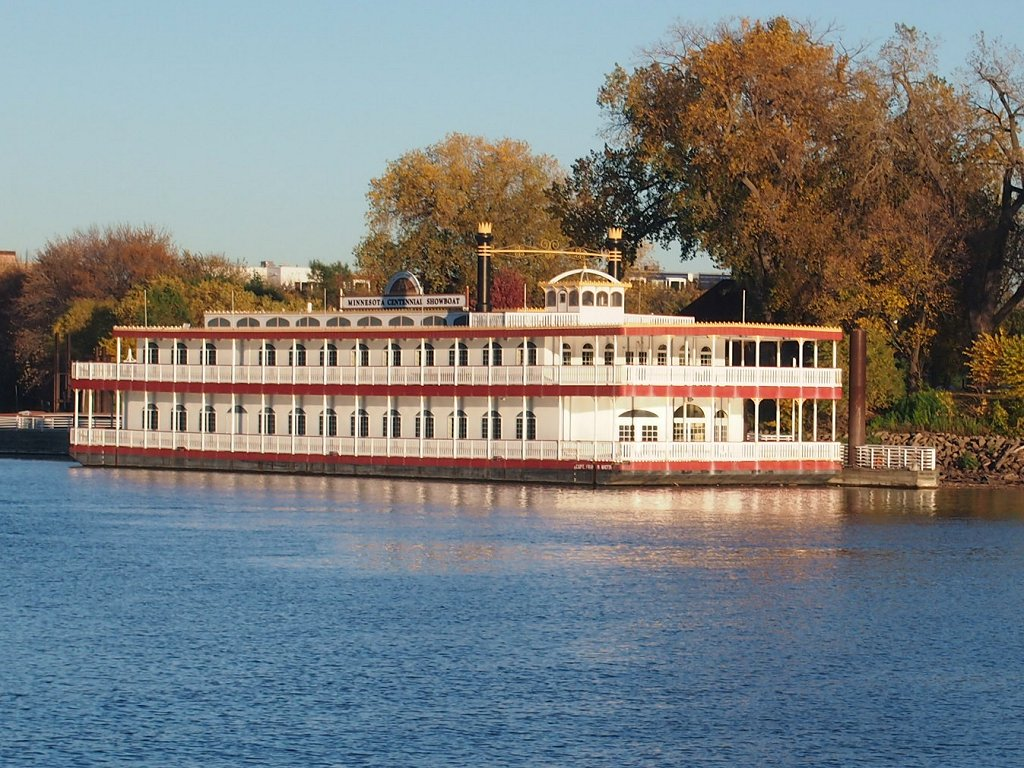
The Minnesota Centennial Showboat from across the Mississippi River

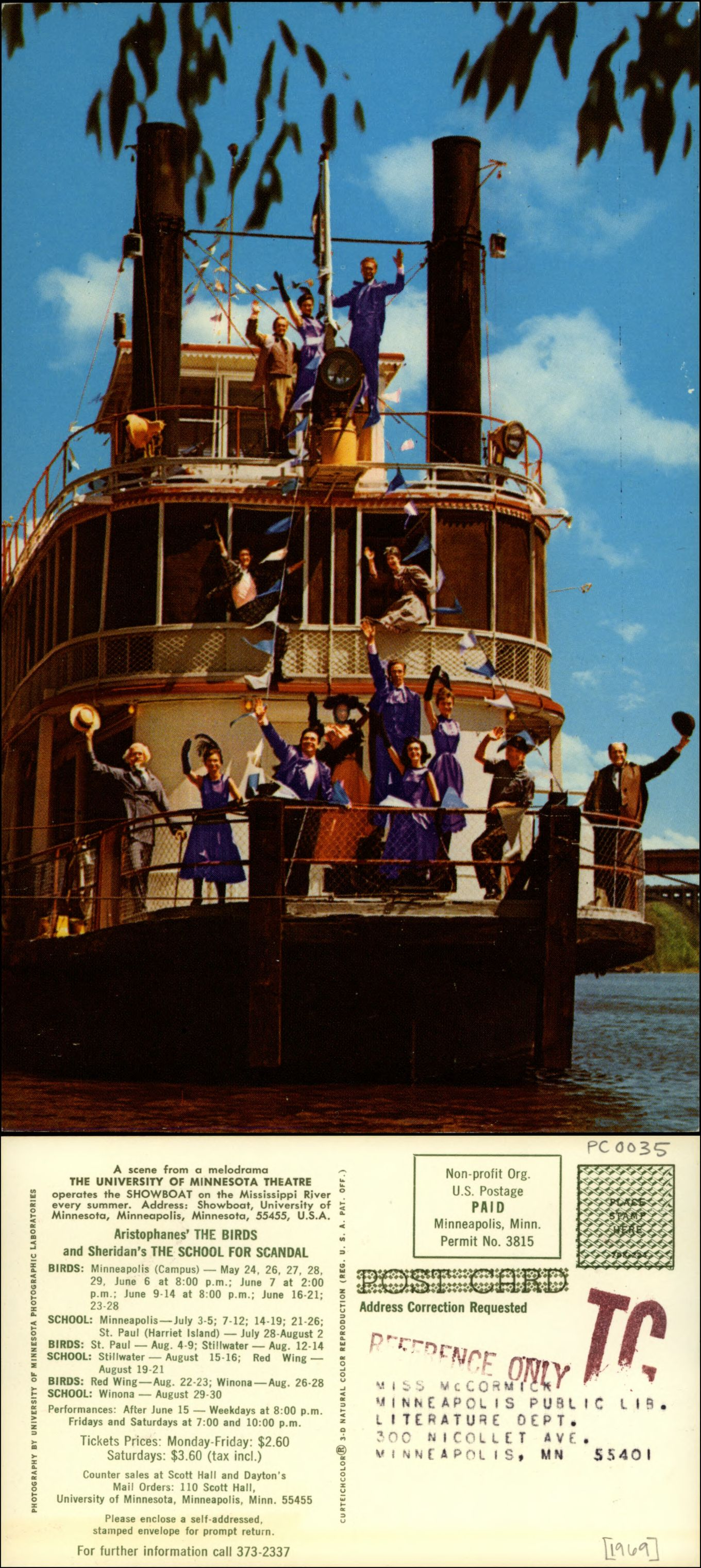
The Showboat in 1969

Minnesota Centennial Showboat was a traditional riverboat theatre docked at Harriet Island Regional Park on the banks of the Mississippi River in downtown Saint Paul, Minnesota, United States. The showboat contained an intimate jewelbox theatre that seated 225. The interior was decorated to keep in time with the Victorian Era style commonly associated with showboats. The Minnesota Centennial Showboat was run through a partnership with the University of Minnesota Theatre Department and the Padelford Boat Company. The showboat was a longtime tradition with the University beginning in 1958. The University Theatre utilized the showboat as a learning opportunity for its students to experience professional theatre. The showboat had its final performance in 2016.

== History ==
In 1956, the Minnesota Centennial Commission began to plan for the 1958 state centennial celebration. Frank Whiting, director of the University of Minnesota's theater program, saw an opportunity to realize his dream of a showboat theater on the Mississippi River. He proposed a Minnesota Centennial Showboat. The commission agreed, and the search began for a suitable boat.

Finding a paddleboat wasn't easy, and building one on an existing barge proved too costly. In 1957, Whiting and the Centennial Commission's Tom Swain learned that the U.S. Army Corps of Engineers planned to retire the General John Newton, a 175-foot (53 m) sternwheeler towboat built in 1899. Minnesota Senator Edward J. Thye helped to arrange its transfer to the university for the symbolic fee of one dollar.

The paddleboat arrived in Saint Paul on April 3, 1958. The university had less than three months to prepare it for the season opening on June 26. Students helped to recreate the atmosphere of an 1890s showboat by painting walls, sewing curtains, reupholstering old theater seats, building scenery, and sewing costumes.

The first season opened with a production of Augustin Daly's 1867 melodrama Under the Gaslight. Miss Minnesota Diane Albers, assisted by Doc Whiting and Centennial Commission Chairman Peter Popovich, christened the boat by breaking a bottle of champagne across the bow. James S. Lombard of the commission's arts committee cut the ribbon to open the gangplank. Mayor Joseph E. Dillon of Saint Paul rang the ship's original bell to invite the theater's first patrons aboard.

In its early years, the showboat traveled up and down the river. It stopped for scheduled performances in Minneapolis, Saint Paul, Stillwater, Hastings, Red Wing, Wabasha, and Winona. The student cast, numbering about fifteen, performed one or two plays each season. Each show featured vaudeville-style olios (lively song-and-dance numbers) between acts. In addition to performing, the actors cleaned the boat, greeted visitors, and took tickets, among other tasks.

1969 marked the last season the boat toured. Following that season, it made an appearance in the Swedish film The Emigrants before settling into a stationary mooring site on the river's east bank, below Coffman Memorial Union.

In 1995, the ninety-six-year-old paddleboat moved to Saint Paul for $2 million in needed repairs. However sparks from a welder ignited a fire that destroyed the boat on the evening of January 27, 2000, just months before its scheduled reopening. Only the paddlewheel and burned-out hull remained.

University theater professor C. Lance Brockman led a campaign to obtain a new showboat. In December 2000, the university agreed to a partnership with the City of Saint Paul, the Saint Paul Riverfront Development Corporation, and the Padelford Packet Boat Company to build a new showboat. Construction began the following spring in Greenville, Mississippi.

Christened the Frank M. Whiting, the new Minnesota Centennial Showboat arrived at Harriet Island on April 17, 2002. It opened on July 4 with a production of Dr. Jekyll and Mr. Hyde.

The Minnesota Centennial Showboat exposed students to a unique type of theater. Student actors embraced the over-the-top style of melodrama. Designers and student crews met the challenges presented by a small performance space. Audiences joined the fun by booing and hissing at the villain and applauding the hero.

The showboat program earned the Tourism Partner of the Year Award from the Saint Paul Convention and Visitors Bureau in 2004. The Padelford Packet Boat Company joined the university's Department of Theatre Arts & Dance to create the C. Lance Brockman Showboat Scholarship later that year.

The final curtain came down on the Minnesota Centennial Showboat at the end of the 2016 summer season. The university's fifteen-year agreement with the City of Saint Paul expired, and the university cut the program for budget reasons. The final season featured a revival of Under the Gaslight.

In 2018, a nonprofit raised money to buy the boat and move it to Winona, Minnesota.

The university sold the boat to the City of Saint Paul for one dollar. The showboat was being renovated in St. Paul when it caught fire and burned down.

== The Showboat Players ==
The Showboat Players were a troupe of performers that were cast exclusively from students at the University of Minnesota. They performed a wide range of melodramas and comedies, plays most commonly viewed by 19th century audiences. The Showboat Players are most known for their whimsical olios. Many well-known performers today received their first taste of professional theatre as a Showboat Player; Loni Anderson, Linda Kelsey, Peter MacNicol, Peter Michael Goetz, and Jon Cranney to name a few.

== Olios ==
Olios are musical entertainment pieces performed either between scenes or as an afterpiece to relieve the tension created by the melodrama and its serious storyline. University of Minnesota Professor Robert Darrell Moulton, who created many of the olios performed, found it important to have the olios be in contrast to the play, but be in tune with it stylistically and thematically. The olios mainly depend on the performers' strengths; they may also use a clever "gimmick" or surprise. It is essential in an olio to present romance, nostalgia, color, extravagance, and affectionate fun. Olios have been a favorite among the Showboat audiences, and this was mainly due in part to Bob Moulton drawing upon his talents as a dancer, costumer, choreographer, and director.

== Shows performed on the showboat ==
- 1958: Under the Gaslight
- 1959: Billy the Kid and She Stoops to Conquer
- 1960: Forty-Five Minutes From Broadway
- 1961: Bloomer Girl
- 1962: Rip van Winkle and The Merry Wives of Windsor
- 1963: Camille and Under the Gaslight
- 1964: A Midsummer Night's Dream and Zoey, or Life in Louisiana
- 1965: Because I Love You and Arms and the Man
- 1966: The Great Git-Away and Fashion
- 1967: Romeo and Juliet and Charley's Aunt
- 1968: The Rivals and Trelawny of the "Wells"
- 1969: The School for Scandal and The Birds
- 1970: Lady of Lyons and Tartuffe
- 1971: The Matchmaker and The Devil's Disciple
- 1972: Show Boat and The Madwoman of Chaillot
- 1973: A Midsummer Night's Dream and Stephen Foster
- 1974: The Importance of Being Earnest and The Tavern and Trial By Jury
- 1975: An Ideal Husband and The Magistrate
- 1976: The Streets of New York
- 1977: The Black Crook
- 1978: Dracula
- 1979: Dandy Dick
- 1980: Charley's Aunt
- 1981: Hazel Kirke
- 1982: The Belle of New York
- 1983: Florodora
- 1984: The Count of Monte Cristo
- 1985: The Girl of Golden West
- 1986: Sherlock Holmes
- 1987: The Bat
- 1988: Down River Ramble: A Mississippi Panorama
- 1989: Captain Jinks of the Horse Marines
- 1990: The Moonstone
- 1991: Dracula
- 1992: Angel Street and The Mystery of Irma Vep
- 1993: The Mousetrap
- 1994: Charley's Aunt
- 1995: Peg O' My Heart
- 1996: The Matchmaker
- 2002: Dr. Jekyll and Mr. Hyde
- 2003: Dracula
- 2004: The Mousetrap
- 2005: Importance of Being Earnest
- 2006: Forty-Five Minutes from Broadway
- 2007: Sherlock's Last Case
- 2008: Count of Monte Cristo
- 2009: Is There a Doctor in the House?
- 2010: Triumph of Love
- 2011: The Demon Barber of Fleet Street: The Melodrama of Sweeney Todd
- 2012: The Vampire!
- 2013: Sweet Revenge!
- 2014: Dr. Jekyll and Mr. Hyde
- 2016: Under the Gaslight
