= SS Colvile =

Coordinates: 53.1897°N 99.2544°W

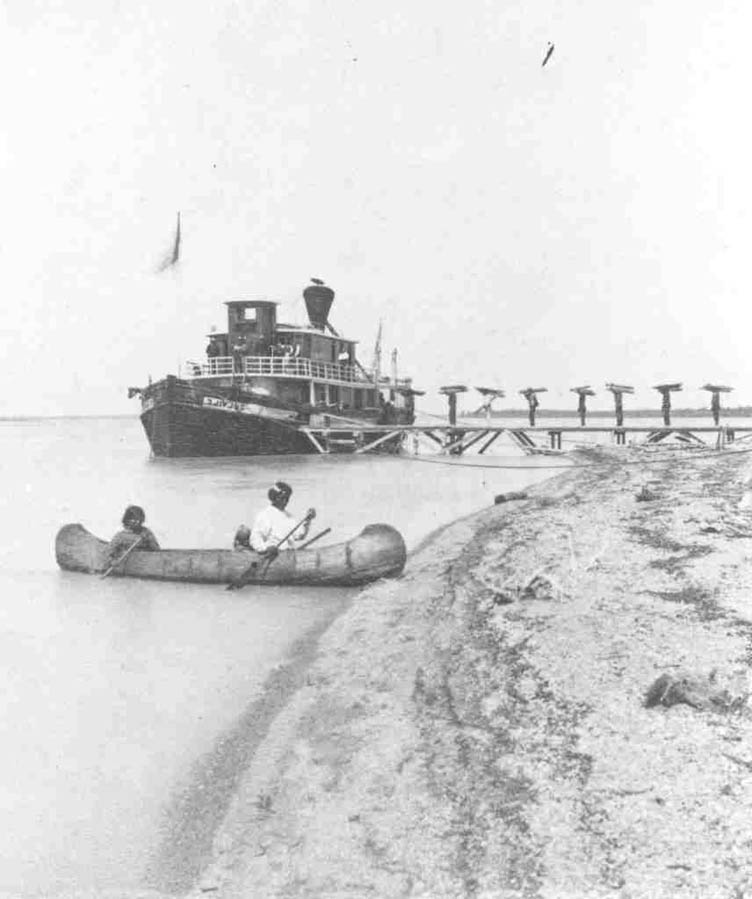
- SS Colvile docked at Norway House, Keewatin District, c. 1880

History
- Name: Colvile
- Owner: Hudson's Bay Company
- Builder: John Reeves at Grand Forks
- Completed: 1875
- Fate: Burned 1894
- Notes: Two non-condensing side-valve engines made April 1872 by C. Dumont, Cincinnati, Ohio

SS Colvile was a Lake Winnipeg steamboat built for the Hudson's Bay Company in Grand Forks, Dakota Territory. Colvile was constructed, using some parts of the vessel called Chief Commissioner which in turn used a boiler taken from Anson Northup. Colvile was one of the largest vessels constructed for the HBC. The company hired Captain J. Reeves to supervise the construction of the vessel.

By 1878 Colvile was a vital link in the HBC trade on the Red River of the North and Saskatchewan River routes. When a railway was built to Selkirk, Manitoba, a storage area was built on the shore of the river. Later, this site became known as the Colvile Landing. A railway spur was constructed from the Selkirk station to the landing.

Colvile was destroyed by fire in 1894 while docked in the town of Grand Rapids in the northwest corner of Lake Winnipeg. The fire also destroyed several dockside buildings.
