= Strutton Islands =

Island group in Nunavut, Canada

- Location within Nunavut Location within Canada

Geography
- Location: Northern Canada
- Coordinates: 52°N 79°W
- Archipelago: Arctic Archipelago

Administration
- Canada
- Nunavut: Nunavut
- Region: Qikiqtaaluk

Demographics
- Population: Uninhabited

The Strutton Islands are an uninhabited Canadian arctic islands group located within the midsection of James Bay in Nunavut, Canada. They are situated south of Vieux-Comptoir (Old Factory).

== History ==
In 1906, Revillon built a post on the Strutton Islands to compete with the Hudson's Bay Company post at nearby Charlton Island. The Revillon post was able to receive deep sea supply ships which allowed Strutton to become a Revillon warehouse for goods destined for other Revillon posts in the area.
