= Lord Wellington (1811 ship) =

UK merchant ship, 1811–1823

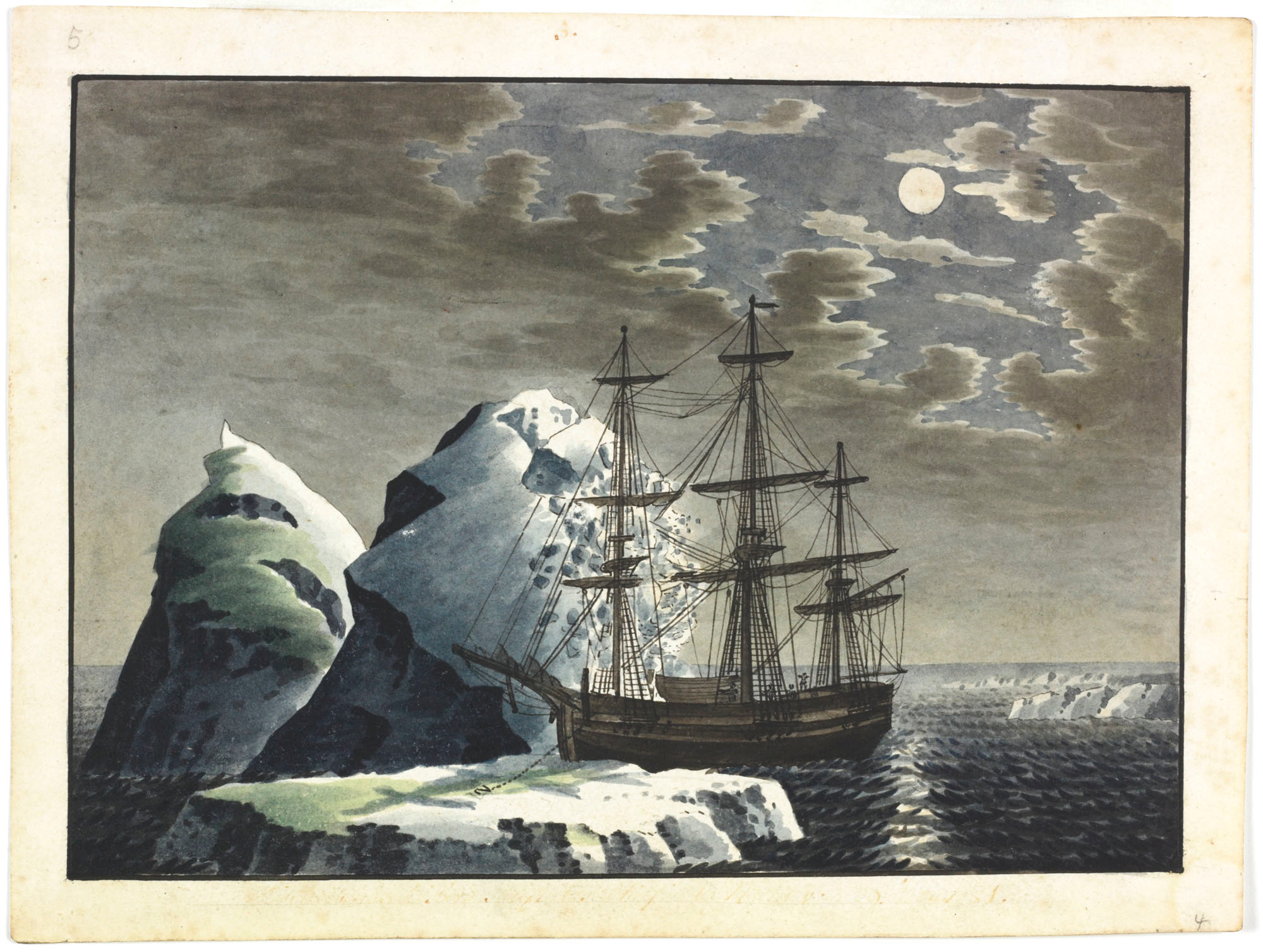
- An iceberg struck Lord Wellington on 29 June 1821

History

United Kingdom
- Name: Lord Wellington
- Namesake: Arthur Wellesley, 1st Duke of Wellington
- Owner: 1811: Joseph Holt, Jr., Campion Coates, and John Richardson; 1823:Holt & Co.
- Builder: J. Langborne and Co., Whitby
- Launched: 1811
- Fate: Wrecked 14 May 1823

General characteristics
- Tons burthen: 410, or 415 (bm)
- Propulsion: Sail
- Armament: 8 × 18-pounder carronades

Lord Wellington was launched in 1811 at Whitby as a London-based transport. She made one voyage to India c. 1816. In 1821 she made one voyage carrying Swiss settlers to Hudson's Bay. She sank in May 1823 after striking an iceberg in the North Atlantic.

== Career ==
Lord Wellington first appeared in Lloyd's Register (LR) in 1811 with "Slighertm", master, Richardson & Co., owners, and trade London Transport.

In 1813 the EIC lost its monopoly on the trade between India and Britain. British ships were then free to sail to India or the Indian Ocean under a license from the EIC.

A list of licensed ships sailing to India showed Lord Wellington, W. Williamson, master, sailing to Batavia and Bengal in August 1816.

Both LR and the Register of Shipping (RS) for 1820 showed Lord Wellington with trade London–Bengal. However, LR gave the name of her master as J. Antice, and RS gave it as Williamson. This appears to be stale data as lists of licensed ships between 1819 and 1823 show no further such voyages for her.

Year	Master	Owner	Trade	Source & notes
1821	Harrison	Campion	London – Quebec	RS; pairs of iron knees and standards 1815
1822	Fulbester; Gattenby	Campion	London – Hudson's Bay	RS; pairs of iron knees and standards 1815

On 30 May 1821, Captain James Falbister sailed from Dordrecht. Lord Wellington was carrying mostly Swiss emigrants bound for York Factory, in what is now Manitoba, on Hudson Bay. One of the passengers was the then 15-year old artist Peter Rindisbacher who painted numerous watercolour pictures of Lord Wellington, other vessels, icebergs, Inuit, and incidents on the voyage. On the way, Lord Wellington sailed in company with the Hudson's Bay Company ships Prince of Wales and Eddystone.

On 29 June, a drifting Iceberg struck Lord Wellington, which anchored on the iceberg.

On 16 July, the three merchantmen encountered HMS Fury and Hecla at 61°20′N 66°30′W. The two British warships were under the command of Commander William Edward Parry. This was Fury's first Arctic journey, but Parry's second in search of the Northwest Passage.

On 24 July, an iceberg struck Prince of Wales, staving in her starboard side. Eddystone and Lord Wellington narrowly escaped. Prince of Wales began to take on water at an alarming rate. To lighten her, Eddystone took on her cargo. Consequently, the damaged timers rose above the water line, making temporary repairs possible.

Lord Wellington and the settlers arrived at York Factory on August 17, together with Prince of Wales and Eddystone. They used boats from York to proceed up the Hayes River to Lake Winnipeg, the mouth of the Red River, and Fort Douglas, the Selkirk Settlement (Red River Colony) fort.

LR for 1823 showed Lord Wellington with J. Gatenby, master, Holt & Co., owners, and trade Liverpool–New Brunswick.

== Fate ==
On 14 May 1823 Lord Wellington, Gatenby, master, was sailing from Liverpool to Miramichi, New Brunswick, when she struck an iceberg on the Newfoundland Banks (41°N 52°W) and stove in her bows. When the water in her hold rose to eight feet her 19 crew members abandoned her and went on board Thompson Packet about a week later. They landed at Picton on 21 May. (Note: Thompson Packet, of 201 tons (bm), had been launched in 1817 at Dumfries.)
