= Otter (steamship) =

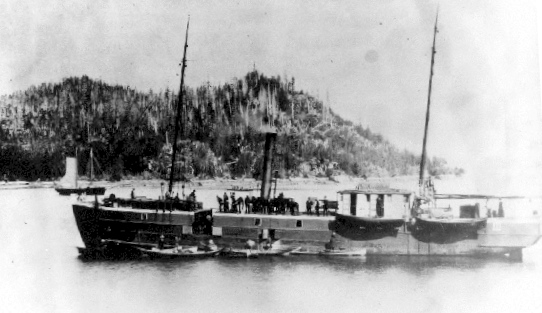
- Otter about 1852

History

Colony of Vancouver Island, Colony of British Columbia
- Name: Otter
- Builder: Blackwall Yard
- Laid down: London, England
- Launched: 1852
- In service: 1852
- Out of service: 1886
- Status: burned for scrap in 1895

General characteristics
- Length: 122 feet (37 m)
- Beam: 20 feet (6.1 m)
- Draft: 12 feet (3.7 m)
- Propulsion: screw-steamer

Otter was the second steamship to operate in the Pacific Northwest of North America, following her sister ship and twin, the much more famous Beaver. Otter, a sidewheeler, was used to service trading posts maintained by the Hudson's Bay Company between Puget Sound and Alaska and like her sister Beaver became pressed into service during the Fraser Gold Rush on the Lower Fraser River from 1858 onwards. From 16 April 1855 to 3 April 1862, Otter was captained by William Alexander Mouat.

She was built in London, for the Hudson's Bay Company.

She sank on August 21, 1880, but was raised and put back into operation.

She was sold to the Canadian Pacific Navigation Company in 1883. They converted her to a coal hulk in 1886.

Her hull was burned to recover the copper in 1895.

== See also ==
- List of steamboats on the Columbia River
- List of ships in British Columbia
