= Labouchere (paddle steamer) =

Coordinates: 38°05′N 123°01′W

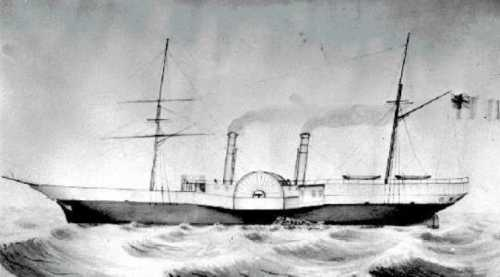

The Labouchere was a paddle steamer in the service of the Hudson's Bay Company, built in 1858 at Green's in Blackwall, London, England. Under the command of Captain J. Trivett it was mostly in service in British Columbia and the rest of the Pacific Northwest in the 1850s and 1860s, including the Stikine lisière in Russian America. In 1859, its then-captain John Swanson was elected by a "celebrated" majority of one (there was only one qualified elector) in the colonial riding of Nanaimo for the Legislative Assembly of the Colony of Vancouver Island.

In 1862 the Labouchere, while trading in Russian America (now Alaska), was nearly captured by aboriginal people presumably of the Tlingit tribe, as reported by George Davidson, Assistant United States Coast Survey: "In May 1862, between two hundred and fifty and three hundred Tlingit on the west side of Chatham Strait, and about twenty-five miles north of Icy Strait, seized the captain and chief trader of the Hudson's Bay Company's steamer Labouchere, of seven hundred tons, on the quarter-deck, and taking possession of the vessel drove the crew forward. But parleying took place, and the crew having a large gun trained aft, agreed to fire off their rifles, the Tlingit afterwards doing the same, and finally leaving the vessel, which at night quietly steamed away and was afraid to return for a year. It is but just to the Tlingit chiefs to say that when the vessel returned they covered her deck with fine sea-otter and other skins as a present to the captain and trader and a token of peace."

By 1865-66 the Labouchere served the San Francisco to Victoria run. On its second run on that route, under the command of W.A. Mouat and carrying 100 passengers and cargo on behalf of Faulkner, Bell & Co., the Labouchere was grounded in heavy fog off Point Reyes after disembarking San Francisco on 14 April 1866 and, after backing off the reef and staying offshore overnight, sank on the morning of the 15th. One of eight lifeboats was swamped, incurring the loss of two lives. Those in the lifeboats were picked up by Rescue; 23 men who had stayed on board were rescued by the Italian fishing vessel Andrew just before the Labouchere sank beneath the waves.

== Legacy ==
Labouchere Channel and Labouchere Point, on the northeast end of King Island in the Dean Channel area of the Central Coast of British Columbia, near Bella Coola, and Labouchere Passage near Drury Inlet farther south, are named after the Labouchere. The vessel was named for Henry Labouchere who was colonial secretary from 1855 to 1858. Labouchere Bay on Prince of Wales Island in Alaska was named for the sidewheeler Labouchere.

== See also ==
- List of ships in British Columbia
