= Padelford Riverboats =

River boat cruise provider in Minnesota, US

- Founded: 1969; 57 years ago
- Founder: William Bowell
- Headquarters: Saint Paul, Minnesota, United States
- Website: www.riverrides.com/index.html

Padelford Riverboats, established in 1969, is the sole provider of river boat cruises within the Mississippi National River and Recreation Area in the Twin Cities of the U.S. State of Minnesota. Padelford boats cruise on the Mississippi River and celebrate the history of the region.

The Padelford Riverboat Company is based at Harriet Island in downtown St. Paul. The company was founded in 1969 by William Bowell - a World War II decorated veteran - at a time when the Mississippi River was neglected and underused. The activities of Bowell and Padelford helped build relationships between the people and the river, and spurred positive changes on the riverfront.

== History ==
Founder William Bowell grew up close to the river, helping his father's small business on Harriet Island. He served in World War II, then enrolled at Macalester College after the war. His lifelong dream was to pilot a boat on the Mississippi River. He was a curator for the Minnesota Historical Society and later a businessman, but returned to the river in 1969 to start the Padelford Riverboat business. His lifelong collection of books about the river, along with historic photographs, books, blueprints, original documents, and other reference materials are stored in the Captain William D. Bowell, Jr. River Library, housed in the National Mississippi River Museum & Aquarium in Dubuque, Iowa.

After initially purchasing the paddle steamer Jonathan Padelford, Bowell continued to expand the boat inventory. He also expanded the original boat itself - cutting it in half and adding a 20-foot section at midship. The eventual fleet included three coast-guard rated boats and 5 vessels total.

In 2006, the three co-owners sold one of their boats, the Harriet Bishop, to buy a new overnight cruiser to replace the Viking Explorer, which had been sold in 1998. But before they could get their hands on one, the economy slipped into recession and that extra cash ended up providing the necessary resources for the company to remain in operation.

== Operations ==
The company was founded by Captain William Bowell, who retired in 2002, passing leadership of the company to his family members Bill Bowell Jr, Beth Myers, Shelley Kosmo, Steve Bowell, and Jim Kosmo; and General Manager Gus Gaspardo.

The Padelford operated out of Harriet Island originally, and continues to this day. For a period from 1988 until 2004, they also operated from Boom Island in Minneapolis. Their Minneapolis operations were within a contract with the Minneapolis Park and Recreation Board, and ended when the two parties were unable to come to terms for a new contract.

Starting in 1996, Padelford partnered with the National Park Service, the Minnesota Department of Natural Resources, the Science Museum of Minnesota, the St. Paul chapter of the National Audubon Society, Hamline University's Center for Global Environmental Education, and other government agencies and nonprofit organizations to create a temporary floating classroom/field trip series. This field trip series on a Padelford riverboat includes curriculums involving environmental studies, ecology, aquatic life and watershed stewardship as well as cultural studies and regional history.

The Padelford company partnered with the University of Minnesota to bring back their flagship vessel, the Minnesota Centennial Showboat, containing a 210-seat theater. The Showboat Players - theater students of the University - performed melodramas and olios in that venue. Originally operated by the University itself, the refurbished vessel arrived back at Harriet Island on April 17, 2002. The University decided to end the partnership due to declining interest in melodramas. Its final show - also featured during its first season - was Under the Gaslight in 2016.

In 2004, the Padelford participated in the 2004 Grand Excursion, celebrating the 150-yr anniversary of the original grand excursion in 1854. As part of that event, the company provided public and private cruises from Diamond Bluff, Wisconsin for one week. The Padelford participated in other steamboat revival events throughout the region.

The company was a founding member of the Passenger Vehicle Association and has been an active member in the association.

== Mississippi riverfront resurgence ==
In the early part of the century, industrialization and farming activities caused the Mississippi to become very polluted. Not only was the MNRRA region named and identified, but regular recreational activity of all kinds increased starting in that period.

When Bowell launched the Padelford, there were no cruise lines operating in that stretch of the river - the closest was in Iowa. The locks and dams had recently been built and the river was used mainly for industrial shipping. Bowell went against that grain and provided access to the river on a recreational basis, including also a dose of regional history in each excursion. Through to the current day, the company remains involved in a wide variety of activities focused on the river.

== Vessels ==
The Jonathan Padelford is a nearly authentic Mark Twain-era sternwheeler riverboat that was built in 1969 at Dubuque Boat and Boiler Co., Dubuque, IA. The boat replicates the paddle wheel mechanism, but operates on diesel fuel instead of the original steam technology. Two years after completion the Padelford was taken to a shipyard in Lemont, Illinois, where it was cut in two and a 20-foot section was added at midship. The lengthening increased capacity and made the overall length 125 feet with a 24-foot beam. Capacity: 313. The name Jonathan Padelford is that of the founder's ancestor, a territorial pioneer who came to Minnesota in 1856.

In 1988 the 300-passenger sidewheeler Anson Northrup was added. Built in 1988 in Jennings, LA the Northrup started in service with public excursions on Father’s Day, June 19, 1988. Length - 92 feet.

In 1990 a car/truck ferry vessel named the Brandon Paul from Tiptonville, Kentucky was acquired, renamed the Betsey Northrup and converted to a two deck, 300-passenger party barge. The main deck was enclosed while the second deck was left open but was covered for maximum sightseeing. Length - 108 feet.

Viking Explorer - formerly the Arkansas Explorer - Length - 110 feet; built in 1980; Capacity - 34 passengers. Mini cruise ship with 24 staterooms, provided cruises that ranged as far as Florida. Viking Explorer was sold in 1992.

Harriet Bishop - Length - 98 Feet; Built 1987, Utica, Indiana; Capacity - Harbor Cruises: 350, Riverboat Race, Themed Harbor and Parade of Tall Stacks Cruises: 300, Lunch and Dinner Cruises: 264.

Captain Frank M. Whiting - Showboat built in 2002 by John Nichols of Mississippi Marine for the University of Minnesota and Padelford. Owned by the University of Minnesota and operated by Padelford as the replacement of the original Minnesota Centennial Showboat until 2016. Capacity - 499.

== See also ==
- Minnesota Centennial Showboat
- Steamboats of the Mississippi
