= Chief Commissioner (HBC vessel) =

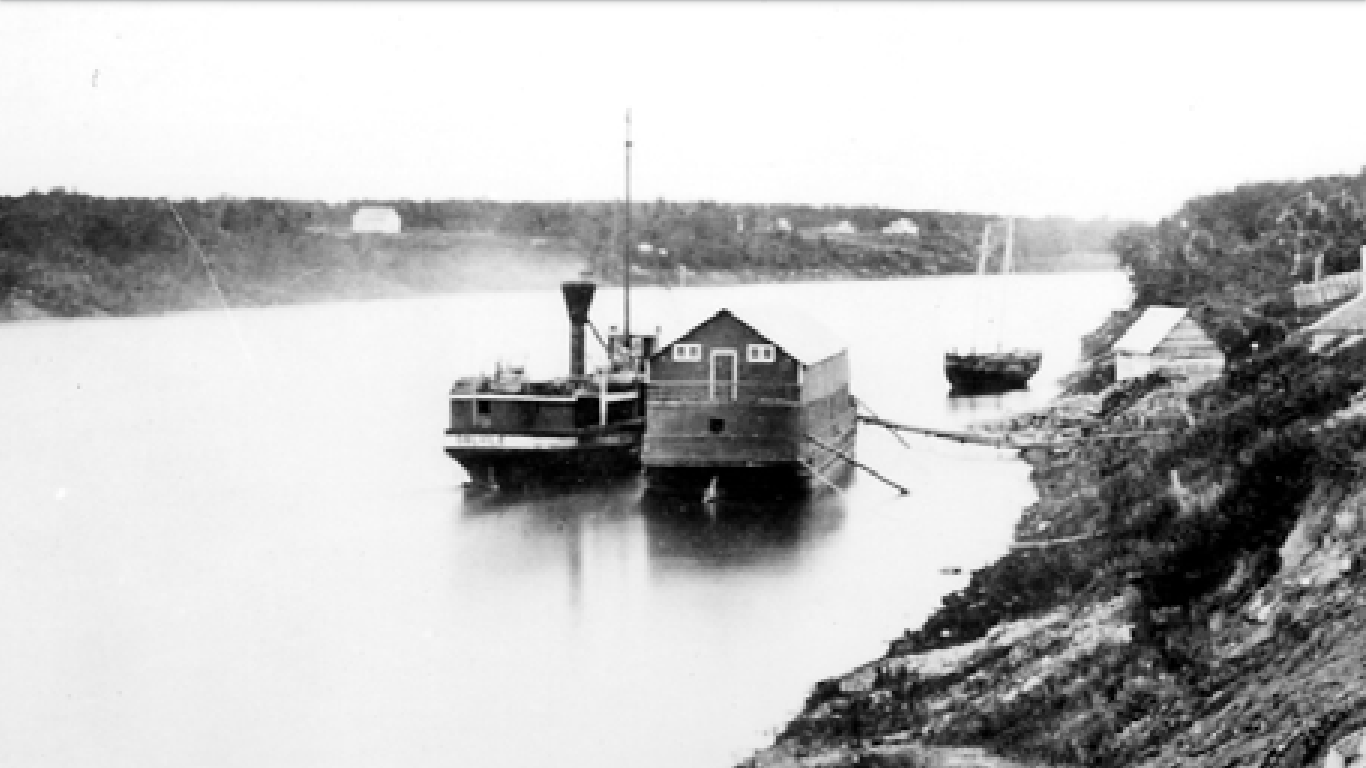
After being stripped of her steam engine the Chief Commissioner (right) was converted to a floating warehouse.

Chief Commissioner was a Hudson's Bay Company propeller driven steamship intended for operation on the Saskatchewan River. She was launched in May 1872, in Fort Garry. However, her draft was too deep, and for her three years of operation, she provided service on Lake Winnipeg. She was retired in 1875, with her components cannibalized and used in other vessels.
