= City of Winnipeg (HBC vessel) =

Hudson's Bay Company steamship

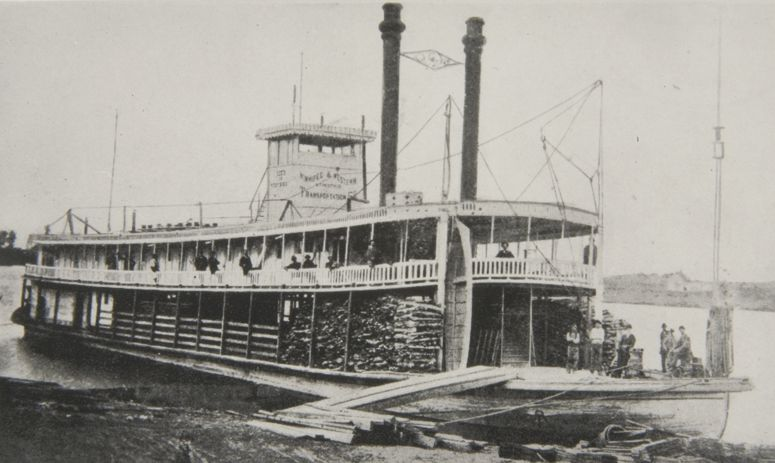

History
- Name: City of Winnipeg

City of Winnipeg was a Hudson's Bay Company steamship. She was launched in Grand Forks in 1881, being a lengthened version of the Minnesota. She was described, at the time, as:

"The City of Winnipeg is a finely appointed, three-decked steamboat, gaily painted and upholstered and kept in the most spotless and shining order throughout."

Problems with her lengthening caused her to start to fall apart, mere months after her completion. She had to be towed back to Grand Forks for extensive repairs.

After strengthening she was transferred from the Red River to the Saskatchewan River.
