= Vancouver (steamboat) =

History
- Builder: Hudson's Bay Company

General characteristics
- Tons burthen: 324 tons
- Crew: 24

Vancouver was a barque (a kind of sailing ship) built and operated by the Hudson's Bay Company to serve on the route between London, England and Fort Victoria on Vancouver Island in what is now the province of British Columbia, Canada. Other vessels committed to the route were Columbia and Cowlitz, but Vancouver was the first of the three to enter Victoria harbour, and the first vessel to sail directly from England to enter that port, in 1845. Other vessels in the company's service were Nereid and Cadboro.

Vancouver was 324 tons burthen, and had six guns and a crew of 24 men.

== See also ==
- List of ships in British Columbia
