= Fort Garry (1920 HBC vessel) =

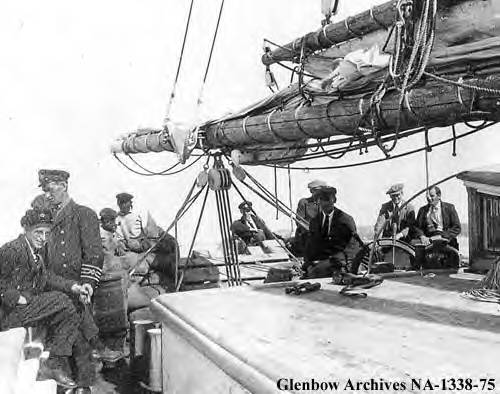
Albert Revillon in Ungava Bay.

Fort Garry was a vessel built in Little Brook, Nova Scotia, in 1920. Her first owners were Revillon Frères Ltd., who operated her under the name Albert Revillon. She was later purchased by the Hudson's Bay Company. She is described as a propeller driven steam powered schooner, of 246 tonnes.
