= Charlton Island =

Uninhabited island in Nunavut, Canada

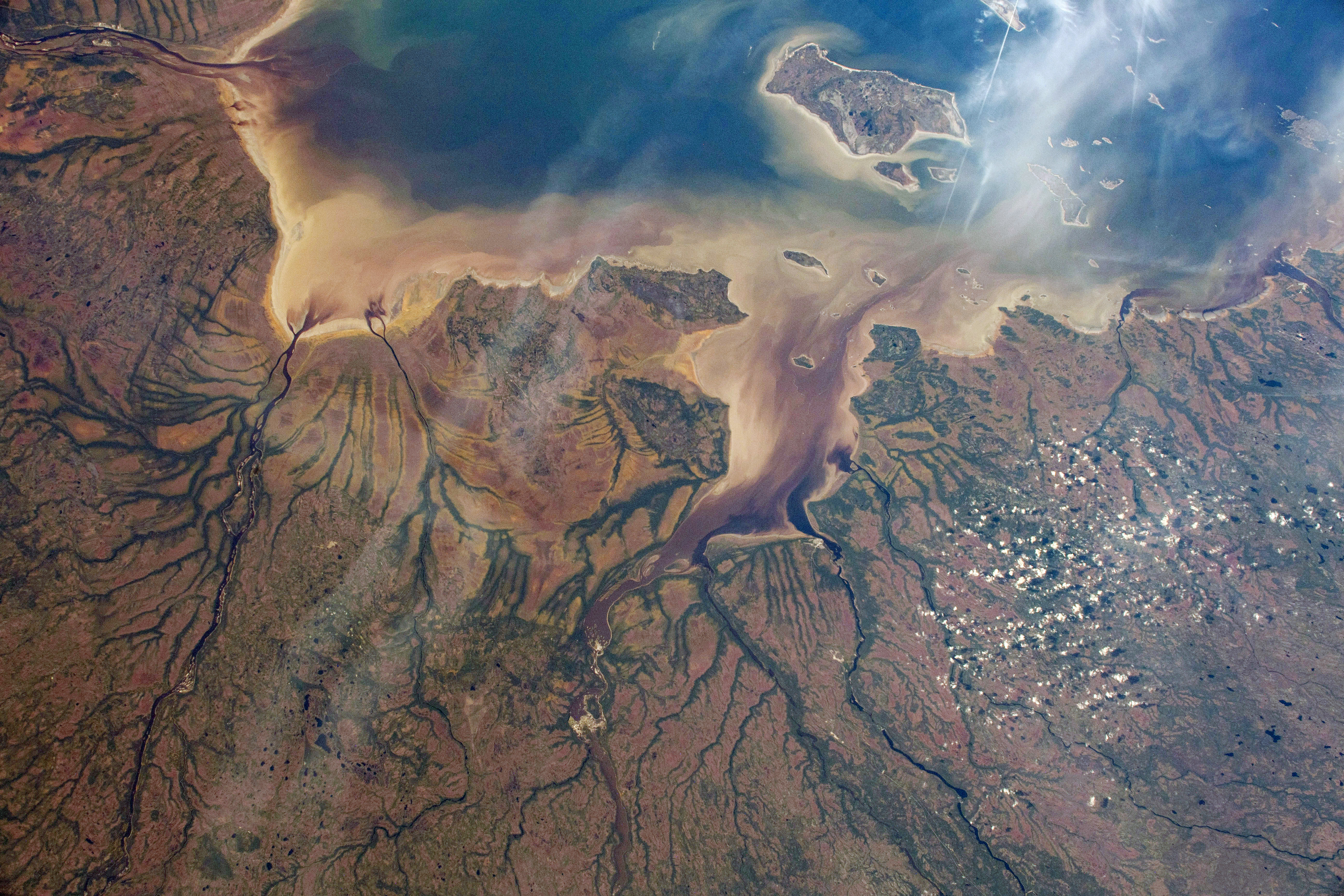

- Location within Nunavut

Geography
- Location: James Bay
- Coordinates: 51°59′59″N 79°29′10″W
- Archipelago: Arctic Archipelago
- Area: 308 km^{2} (119 sq mi)

Administration
- Canada
- Nunavut: Nunavut
- Region: Qikiqtaaluk

Demographics
- Population: Uninhabited

Charlton Island (Sivukutaitiarruvik) is an uninhabited island located in James Bay, Qikiqtaaluk Region, Nunavut, Canada. Located northwest of Rupert Bay, it has an area of 308 km^{2} (119 sq mi), making it the second largest island (after Akimiski Island) in James Bay.

The island has one named locality: Charlton Depot (51°58′00″N 79°19′00″W).

== History ==
Thomas James, who gave his name to James Bay, wintered here in 1631 and named the island after Prince Charles. The founders of Fort-Rupert (1668) must have seen it and Charles Bayly was nearly driven ashore here in 1674. Some time before 1679 Bayly proposed making Charlton Island a central depot and meeting place for the Hudson's Bay Company (HBC), and in 1680, Charlton Depot (also known as Charlton Island Depot) was established. It served as a transshipment point and warehouse for the annual cargo to and from Moose Factory, Albany, and Rupert House, whose harbours were too shallow and rough for safe unloading and loading of large ships bound for England. In 1684, the HBC build a fort on the island. Two years later, the fort was captured by the French during their Hudson Bay expedition.

In 1713, Rupert's Land, including all the posts on James Bay, was returned to England as part of the Treaty of Utrecht. After this, the HBC made Moose Factory its supply depot for James Bay, and Charlton Island was only used on rare occasions.

About 1802 the North West Company (NWC) acquired the brig Eddystone, and placed it under Captain Richards, a former Hudson's Bay Company man, and John George McTavish, the younger brother of the Chief of Clan McTavish. In the summer of 1803 it left Montreal for Hudson Bay. At the same time a force under Angus Shaw left the Tadoussac area for James Bay. They met at Charlton Island in HBC territory and claimed the island for the NWC. They built Fort St. Andrews there and two forts at the mouths of the Moose River and Eastmain River, in defiance of the HBC's monopoly. But the trade was not profitable, and the NWC had abandoned Charlton Island by 1806.

From 1839 to 1902, the HBC used the island as a beaver reserve, where beavers were hunted every four years. In 1902, the depot was reestablished. Once the railroad to Moosonee was built in 1931, cargo was shipped by train to the south and the depot was no longer needed. It closed in 1935.

In 1933, the HBC reestablished the beaver reserve, and used it until 1962. The island continues to be used by the Cree for trapping and goose hunting in the spring.
