= Anson Northup =

19th-century riverboat

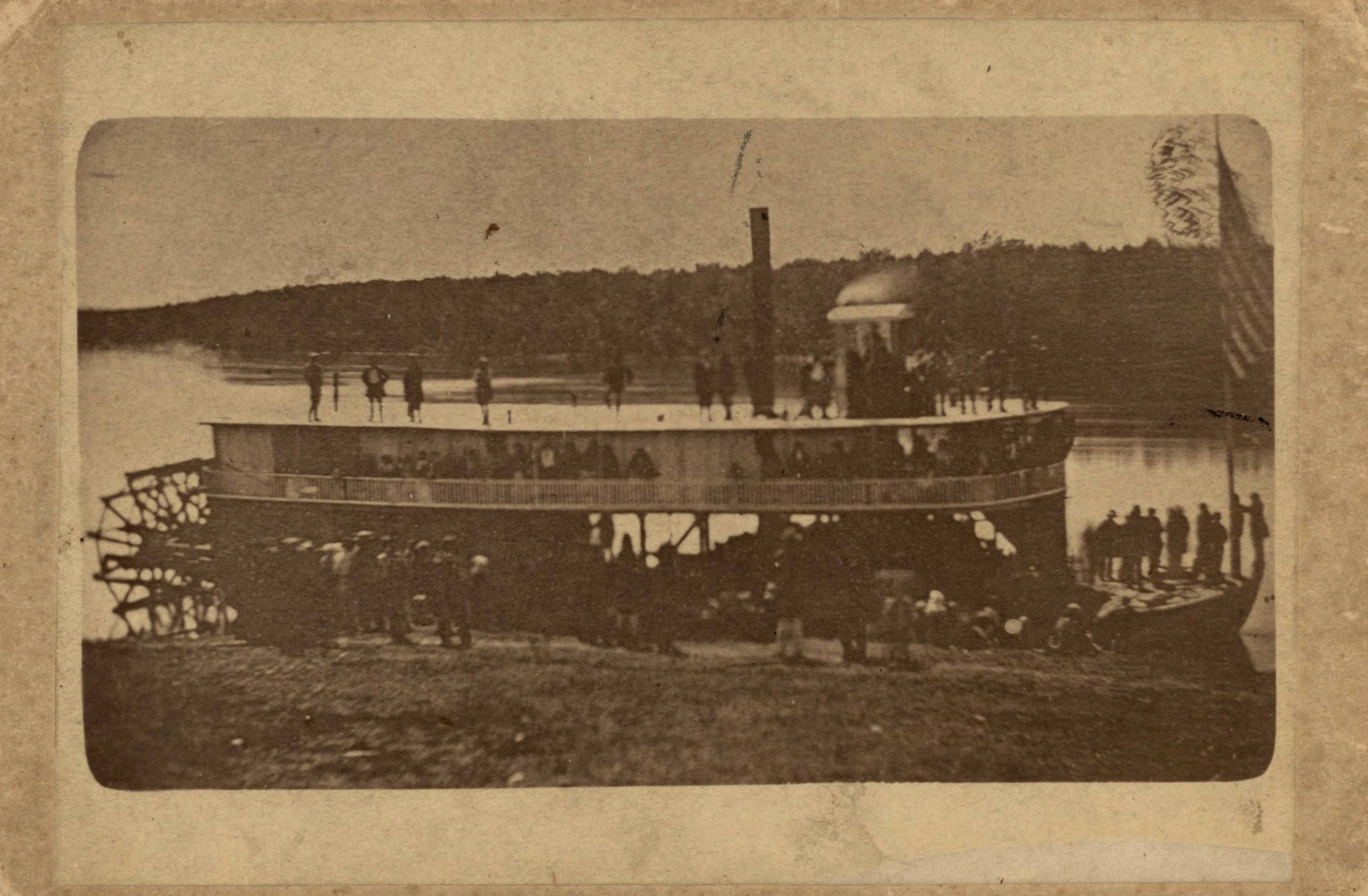

History
- Name: Anson Northup (until 1861); Pioneer (1861)
- Namesake: Anson Northup
- Owner: Anson Northup (until 1861); J. C. Burbank (1861–1862)
- Builder: Anson Northup
- Fate: Sank winter 1861/1862

General characteristics
- Type: Riverboat
- Length: 90 ft (27 m)
- Beam: 22 ft (6.7 m)
- Installed power: 100 hp (75 kW)
- Propulsion: Sternwheel
- Capacity: 50 to 75 tons

Anson Northrup
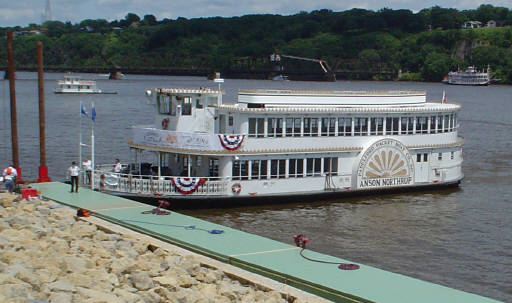
- The new Anson Northrup at Dubuque

History
- Namesake: Anson Northrup (Northup?)
- Owner: Padelford Packet Boat Company
- Launched: 1988

General characteristics
- Type: Riverboat
- Length: 92 ft (28 m)
- Beam: 33 ft (10 m)
- Height: 22 ft (6.7 m)
- Propulsion: Twin Screw

Anson Northup (also called the Anson Northrup) was a 100-horsepower (75 kW) sternwheel riverboat named for her captain, Anson Northup, who was the first to navigate the Red River of the North from Fort Abercrombie, Dakota Territory, to Fort Garry, Rupert's Land, departing 6 June and arriving 10 June 1859. Sold and renamed Pioneer, she sank during the winter of 1861–62. Pioneer was dismantled and her boiler reused by SS Colvile.

The new Anson Northrup is a riverboat that normally offers tours in the Twin Cities area on the Mississippi River. The boat was built in Louisiana and is operated by Padelford Packet Boat Company. In 2004, the boat participated in the Grand Excursion, which ran from the Quad Cities of Iowa to the Twin Cities.
