= Eddystone (1802 ship) =

1802 ship

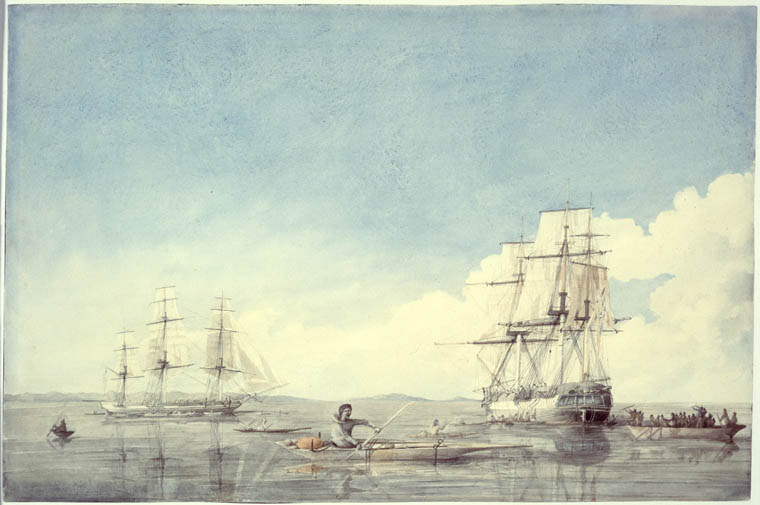
- The Hudson's Bay Company ships Prince of Wales and Eddystone bartering with the Inuit off the Upper Savage Islands, Hudson Strait; by Robert Hood (1819)

History

United Kingdom
- Name: Eddystone
- Namesake: Eddystone Rocks
- Builder: Hull
- Launched: 1802
- Fate: Wrecked 19 May 1843

General characteristics
- Tons burthen: 245 (bm)
- Complement: 28
- Armament: 2 × 6-pounder guns + 12 × 9-pounder carronades

Eddystone (or Eddistone) was launched at Hull in 1802. She then sailed for the North West Company. The French Navy captured her in 1806 but an armed ship of the Royal Navy recaptured her within weeks. She next sailed for the Hudson's Bay Company (HBC) from 1807 to about 1824. She then traded generally until May 1843 when she was wrecked.

== Career ==
Eddystone first appeared in Lloyd's Register (LR) in 1802 with Featherstone, master and owner, and trade Hull–Baltic.

The North West Company's flag after 1801

In 1803 John Fraser, one of the founders of the North West Company, purchased her. At the time, the North West company was challenging the HBC's monopoly on the fur trade at Hudson's Bay. The North West Company sent an overland expedition to the southern end of the bay, and sent Eddyston to meet it there. The Company then established a post on Charlton Island, on James Bay.

Year	Master	Owner	Trade	Source
1803	Featherstone; Richards	Feaherstone; Fraser & Co.	Hull–Baltic	LR
1805	Richard; Sarman	Fraser & Co.	Hull–Baltic; London–Quebec	LR

The French frigates Sirène and Revanche captured Eddystone, Sarman, master, on 13 September 1806 as she was sailing from Quebec to London. The French took out her captain, crew, and furs, which were the most valuable part of her cargo. Colpoys recaptured Eddystone off Cape Finisterre and sent her into Plymouth, where she arrived in early October.

By 1807 the North West Company had given up its operations at Charlton Island. The problem was not the HBC's opposition but rather was one of lack of trade. In 1807 the HBC purchased Eddystone and appointed Captain Thomas Ramsey as her master. Thereafter, Eddystone and Prince of Wales were the main vessels supplying the HBC's posts in Hudson Bay. (Note: Log books exist for Eddystone for the period 1807 to 1823.) Captain Thomas Ramsey acquired a letter of marque on 2 May 1808.

Year	Master	Owner	Trade	Sources & notes
1807	Sarman; Ramsey	Fraser & Co. Hudson's Bay Company	London–Quebec	LR
1810	Ramsey	Hudson's Bay Company	London–Hudson Bay	LR
1815	J.Turner	Hudson's Bay Company	London–Hudson Bay	LR

In 1811 and 1813 Eddystone and Prince of Wales carried settlers to Hudson Bay. In 1815, Eddystone became trapped in the lower part of Hudson Bay and had to overwinter there.

On 21 October 1817, Eddystone, Davis, master, came upon the waterlogged and abandoned Rover, of Newcastle, at 59°30′N 17°30′E. Eddystone could not approach because of the state of the sea. Eddystone was carrying a cargo of timber and furs.

Hudson's Bay Flag

Year	Master	Owner	Trade	Source & notes
1820	Bell	Hudson's Bay Company	London–Hudson's Bay	LR

On 16 July 1821, Eddystone, Prince of Wales, and Lord Wellington were sailing in company to York Factory in Hudson Bay when they encountered HMS Fury and Hecla at 61°20′N 66°30′W. The two British warships were under the command of Commander William Edward Parry. This was Fury's first Arctic journey, but Parry's second in search of the Northwest Passage.

On 24 July, an iceberg struck Prince of Wales, staving in her starboard side. Eddystone and Lord Wellington narrowly escaped. Prince of Wales began to take on water at an alarming rate. To lighten her, Eddystone took on her cargo. Consequently, the damaged timers rose above the water line, making temporary repairs possible.

Year	Master	Owner	Trade	Source & notes
1824	Bell; J.Dale	Hudson's Bay Company	London–Hudson's Bay	LR
1825	J.Dale	T.Benson	Dartmouth	LR; small repairs 1824
1830	H.Harrison	T.Benson	Cowes–Southampton	LR; small repairs 1825 and 1827
1835	J.Kearsley	T.Benson	"Stk."	LR; small repairs 1833 & large repairs 1835
1840	J.Kearsley; Macintosh	T.Benson	Plymouth–America	LR; large repairs 1835 & 1836, small repairs 1838, & damages repaired 1839

In June 1836 Eddystone, Kearsley, master, grounded in the river at Newport, Wales, at the outset of a voyage to Savannah. It appeared her bottom might have been broken and she had to discharge and effect repairs.

== Fate ==
Eddystone was wrecked on 19 May 1843. She was driven ashore and wrecked at Point May, Newfoundland. Her crew were rescued. She was on a voyage from Liverpool, Lancashire to Quebec City. Her entry in Lloyd's Register for 1843 carried the annotation "LOST".
