= Sturge =

Sturge may refer to:

== People ==
Sturge is a Middle Ages surname of Norse-Viking origins, meaning son of Turgis or Thurgis, Turgeus etc., which meant "Thor's follower".

=== Surname ===
- Alfred Sturge (1816–1901), British cleric who ministered in Devon, India and Kent
- David Sturge (born 1948), British athlete in rowing
- Diana Catherine Sturge, Viscountess Eccles DL (born 1933), British Conservative peer and businesswoman
- Edmund Sturge (1808–1893), British Quaker businessman and campaigner for liberal causes
- Eliza Sturge (1842–1905), British women rights activist based in Birmingham
- Emily Sturge (1847–1892), British campaigner for women's education
- Ernest Adolphus Sturge (1856–1934), American missionary, organiser of Japanese Presbyterian churches in California
- Georgina Sturge, British quantitative researcher and author
- Hannah Sturge, born Hannah Dickinson, (1816–1896), British Quaker philanthropist
- Joseph Sturge (1793–1859), British founder of the British and Foreign Anti-Slavery Society
- Mary Sturge (1865–1925), British doctor, known for her pioneering work with alcoholism
- Matilda Sturge (1829–1903), British Quaker minister, poet and essayist from Bristol
- Michael Sturge (1931–2003), English experimental physicist, worked in solid-state spectroscopy
- Sophia Sturge (1849–1936), British Quaker suffragist, social reformer and peace campaigner
- Sophia Sturge (abolitionist) (1795–1845), British slavery abolitionist based in Birmingham
- Thomas Sturge (1787–1866), British oil merchant, shipowner, cement manufacturer, railway company director, social reformer and philanthropist
- Thomas Sturge the elder (1749–1825), London tallow chandler, oil merchant, spermaceti processor and philanthropist
- Wayne Sturge, Trinidad and Tobago politician
- William Allen Sturge (1850–1919), British physician and archaeologist

=== Given name ===
- John Sturge Stephens (1891–1954), British conscientious objector and historian
- Mary Sturge Gretton, born May Gertrude Sturge (1871–1970), British historian and magistrate
- Thomas Sturge Moore (1870–1944), British poet, author and artist
- William Sturge Moore (1785–1809), political figure in Lower Canada

== Places ==
- Sturge Island, one of the three main islands in the uninhabited Balleny Islands group in the Southern Ocean
- Sturge Park, former cricket ground in Montserrat, destroyed by the volcanic eruption of 1997
- Sturge Town, a settlement in Jamaica

== See also ==
- King Sturge, international property consultancy
- Sturge–Weber syndrome (encephalotrigeminal angiomatosis), a rare congenital neurological and skin disorder
