= Elberton =

Places known as Elberton:

- Elberton, Georgia, USA
- Elberton, Montserrat
- Elberton, Gloucestershire, England
- Elberton, Washington, USA
