= Eliza Sturge =

British women's rights activist

- Born: 14 November 1842; Edgbaston
- Died: 24 November 1905 (aged 63); Edgbaston
- Known for: campaigning for women to get the vote

Eliza Mary Sturge (14 November 1842 – 24 November 1905) was a British women rights activist based in Birmingham. She was first woman elected to the Birmingham school board in 1873.

== Life ==
Sturge was born in Edgbaston. Her mother was Mary Darby (born Dickinson) and her father was Charles Sturge who was once Mayor of Birmingham. She came from an important Quaker family. Her aunt was the pacifist Sophia Sturge and her uncle Joseph Sturge was a leading abolitionist.

The Birmingham Women's Suffrage Society was formed in 1868 and in 1871 Sturge became its secretary. The BWSS was related to the National Society for Women's Suffrage which in time became the National Union of Women's Suffrage Societies (NUWSS). This was a suffragist organisation. The suffragettes did not start until 1903. She rose to be vice-President of the BWSS and she spoke frequently on the subject. She noted that the gallantry that her gender received was no substitute for the right to vote. In 1871 she used the phrase "When words needed saying and deeds needed doing...".

In 1872 she, as BWSS President, gave a rousing speech in support of women getting the vote on the same platform as Millicent Fawcett at Birmingham Town Hall. The speeches were later published as pamphlets.

In 1873 the Liberal's added her to the list of candidates to serve on School boards. She was elected in third place. Her contributions during her time on the board were said to be impressive but her views were frequently overshadowed by the existing male patriarchy. She stood down in 1876 to concentrate more time on women's suffrage.

Sturge died in Edgbaston in 1905 at her niece's house. Mary Sturge was able to certify the death as she had benefited from a medical education and she became a surgeon in that year. Mary inherited all of Eliza's legacy including being able to vote in 1918.
