= Robert Charlton =

Robert Charlton may refer to:

- Bobby Charlton (1937–2023), English footballer
- Robert M. Charlton (1807–1854), American politician and jurist

== See also ==
- Robert Charleton (1809–1872), British Quaker minister
- Robert Charleton (judge) (d. 1395/6), English judge
