= Joseph Sturge memorial =

Statue to Joseph Sturge in Edgbaston Birmingham

Joseph Sturge Memorial
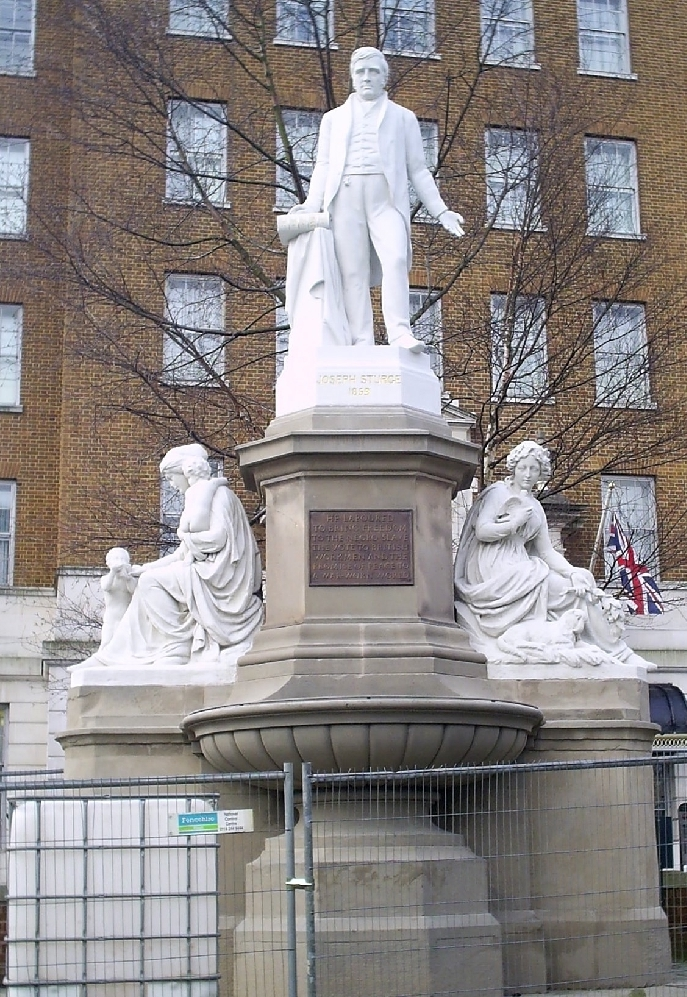
- Memorial after restoration in 2007
- Interactive map of Joseph Sturge Memorial
- Location: Five Ways, Birmingham, England
- Coordinates: 52.4722°N 1.9192°W
- Designer: John Thomas
- Completion date: 4 June 1862
- Restored date: 2006–2007
- Dedicated to: Joseph Sturge

The Joseph Sturge memorial is a memorial to the English Quaker, abolitionist and activist Joseph Sturge (1793–1859) was unveiled before a crowd of 12,000 people on 4 June 1862 at Five Ways, Birmingham, England, near his former home. The statue has been grade II listed since 8 June 1982.

Standing at the boundary between Birmingham and Edgbaston, it was sculpted by John Thomas, whom Sir Charles Barry had employed as stone and wood carver on the former King Edward's Grammar School at Five Ways. He died before completing the memorial, which cost £1000. Some time around 1975, the figure of Sturge's left hand fell off.

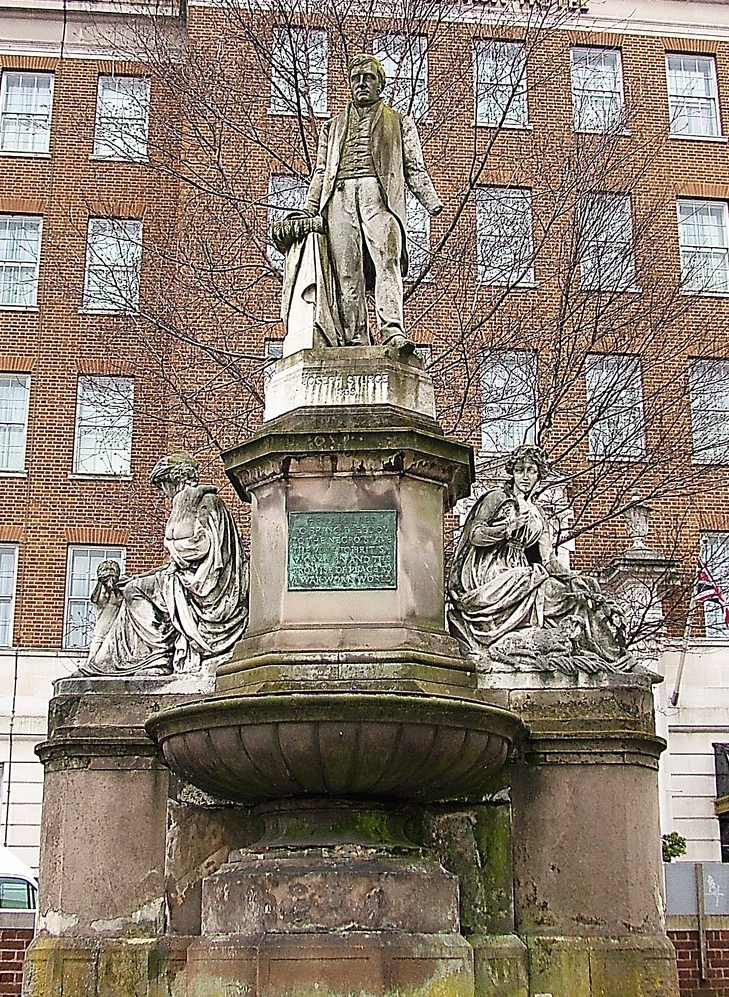
Sturge Memorial before restoration

Sturge is posed as if he were teaching, with his right hand resting on a Bible to indicate his strong Christian faith. He wears a lapel-less coat of a style favoured by contemporary Quakers. Lower on the plinth, he is flanked by two female allegorical figures: one representing Peace holds a dove and an olive branch, with a lamb at her feet, symbolic of innocence; and the other, Charity, offers comfort and succour to two Afro-Caribbean infants, recalling the fight and victory over slavery. Around the crown of the plinth are inscribed the words "Charity, Temperance and Peace" (the word "Temperance" is on a gadrooned basin, which used to dispense drinking water), as well as Sturge's name and his date of death. The figures and pedestal (still the original) are in Portland stone.

In 1925 the monument was moved a short distance, to its current position, and a bronze plaque was affixed to the memorial to tell passers-by more about its subject. The inscription reads (all in capitals; punctuation added for readability):

He laboured to bring freedom to the Negro slave, the vote to British workmen, and the promise of peace to a war-torn world.

In 2006–2007 the Birmingham Civic Society, Birmingham City Council, and the Sturge family restored the statue for the 200th anniversary of the Slave Trade Act 1807. This included the provision of a replacement for the missing hand.

On 24 March 2007, the city held a civic ceremony to formally rededicate the statue. The Lord Mayor of Birmingham, councillor Mike Sharpe, unveiled a new interpretation board giving details of Sturge's life. The work is now in the care of Birmingham City Council.

After years of dirt and grime again, the statue was given another clean from November 2025 to January 2026.

== Gallery ==
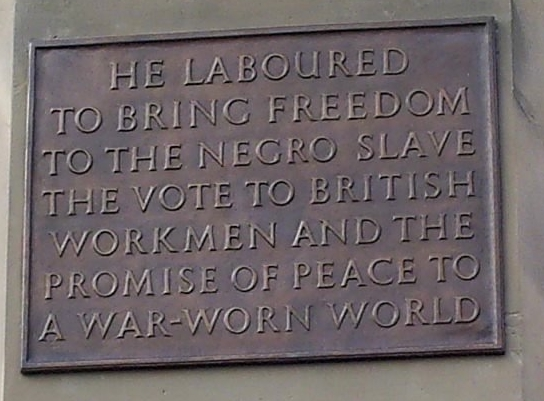
The plaque inscription

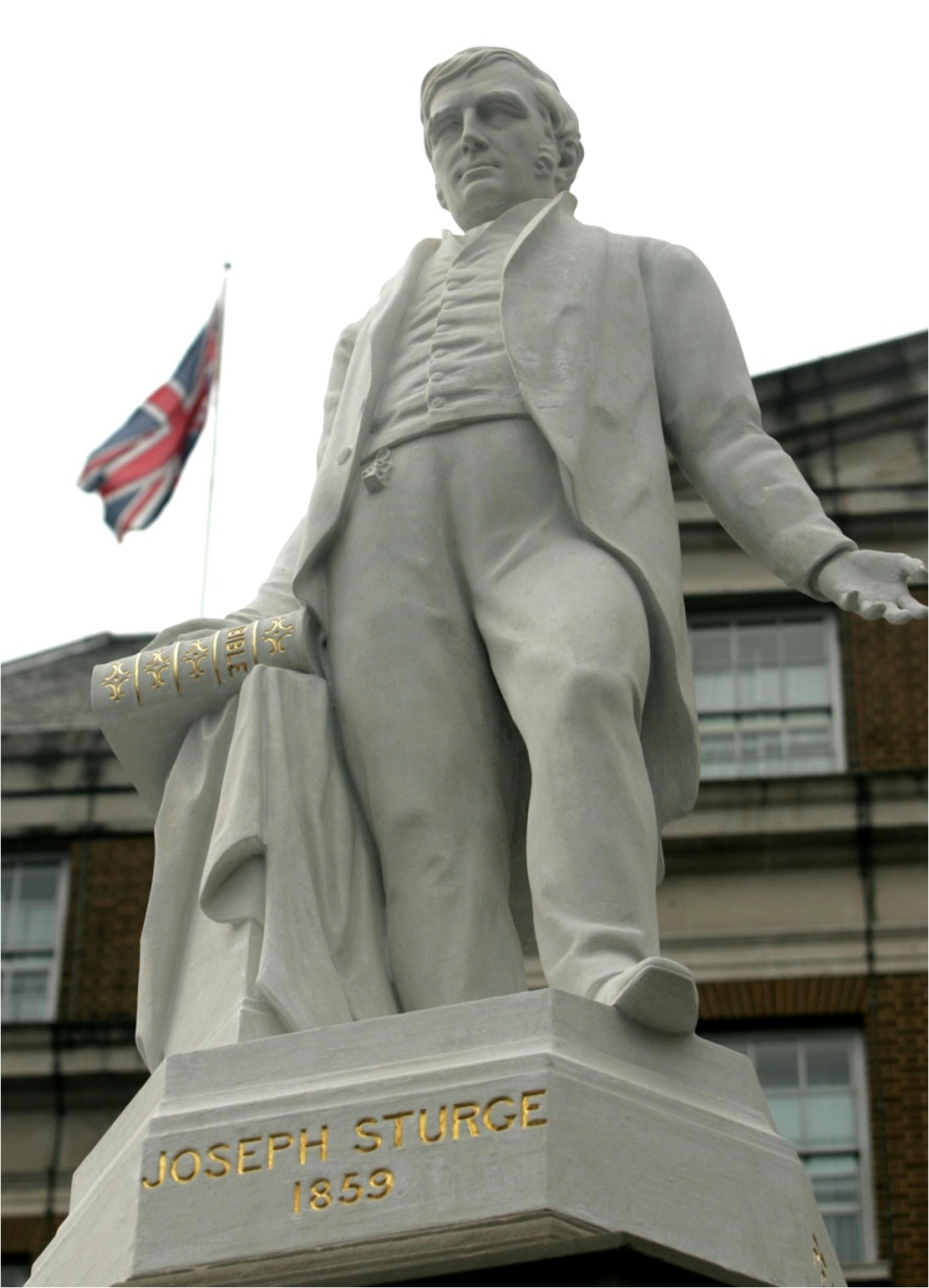
The restored statue of Joseph Sturge on 24 March 2007

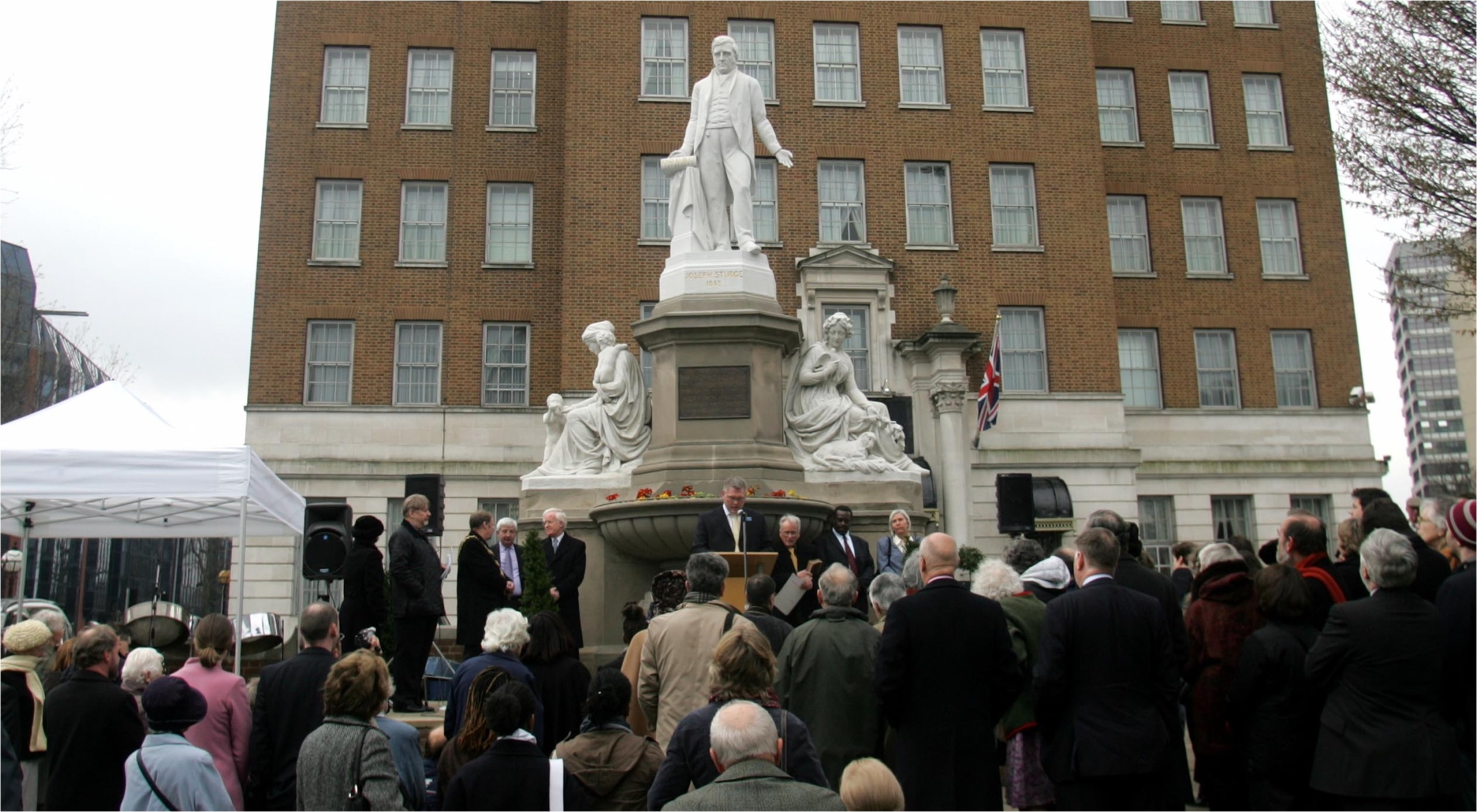
Stephen Hartland of The Birmingham Civic Society spoke at the re-dedication in 2007

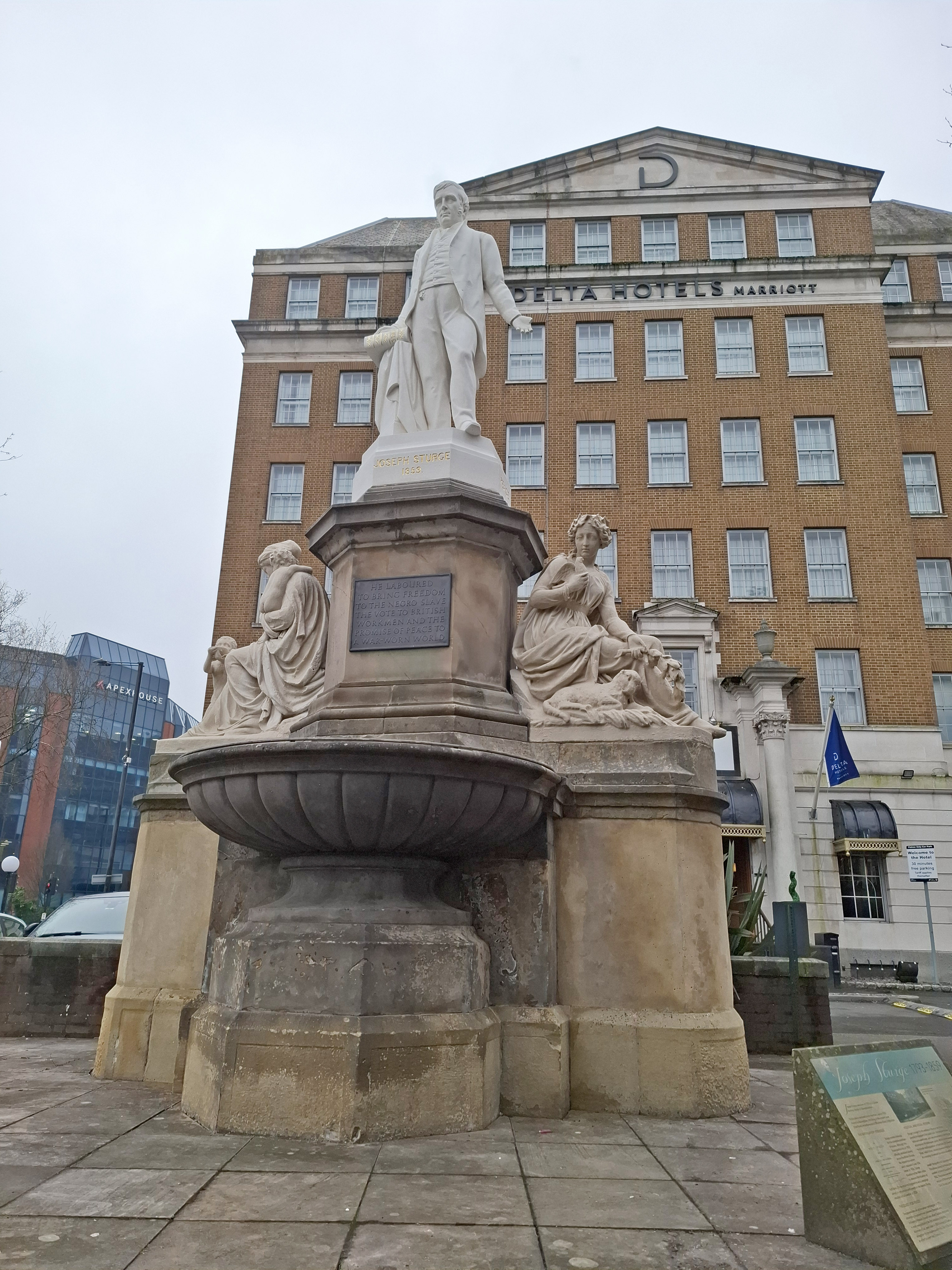
The statue was cleaned again from November 2025 to January 2026.
