= East Redmond, Washington =

- Former town
- Location in Washington and the United States East Redmond (the United States)
- Coordinates: 47°41′21″N 122°05′14″W
- Country: United States
- State: Washington
- County: King
- Incorporated: August 14, 1956
- Dissolved: July 1, 1965

Government
  - Type: Council–manager

Area
  - Total: 4.5 sq mi (12 km^{2})

Population (1960)
  - Total: 203
  - Estimate (1962): 185
- Time zone: UTC-8 (PST)
  - Summer (DST): UTC-7 (PDT)

East Redmond was a short-lived town in King County, Washington that existed from 1956 to 1965. The town, then located to the east of Redmond in the Seattle metropolitan area, was formed as a result of a land use dispute between neighbors. East Redmond, with a population of fewer than 400 people, was found to have not met the state's minimum population requirement for incorporation and was dis-incorporated by a decision of the Washington Supreme Court in 1965.

== History ==
The King County government entered into an agreement with the Dincov family in 1954 to operate a gravel mine on their East Redmond property for use in constructing Interstate 405. The Dincovs' neighbors, in opposition to the gravel mine, proposed to form an incorporated town in order to halt operations. A special election was held on August 14, 1956, and 108 residents voted in favor of incorporating East Redmond as a fourth-class town, while 67 opposed. The town's government passed an ordinance that prohibited the county's gravel mine operations, leading King County to seek a restraining order against the town. East Redmond officials threatened to arrest county employees violating the ordinance, and the requested temporary restraining order was denied by a Superior Court judge. The county was eventually denied an injunction that removed the town from interfering with the mine, due to expired and lapsed permits.

In February 1957, the King County Board of Commissioners received a petition signed by Snoqualmie Valley residents asking for the dis-incorporation of East Redmond. The petition concerned the maintenance of Novelty Hill Road, which ran through East Redmond towards the Snoqualmie Valley, which would be too expensive for East Redmond to maintain; the petition also alleged that the town had created a speed trap on the road. Another petition was presented to the town council that month, signed by 125 of its 375 residents hoping to trigger a dis-incorporation election. The election was called off after a ruling by a Superior Court judge after the discovery of signatures that did not match voter registrations, as well as withdrawn signatures, which reduced the number of petitioners to below the majority of registered of voters. Residents of the Novelty Hill Road area unsuccessfully attempted to secede from East Redmond through a special election in May 1957; The Seattle Times reported that some residents had voted in favor of staying in East Redmond in order to be eligible to vote for dis-incorporation at a later date. A petition to dis-incorporate a majority of the town was certified in June, and the county scheduled a vote on the matter in October. East Redmond voted 164 to 24 to dis-incorporate three-fourths of the town, leaving only 50 residents and 0.87 square miles (2.3 km^{2}). The town annexed 350 acres (140 ha; 0.55 sq mi) the following month, including the Dincov gravel mine, to extend the city's boundaries to Lake Sammamish.

In March 1962, King County Prosecutor Charles O. Carroll filed a court action on the request of a Superior Court judge and 42 East Redmond residents that challenged the validity of East Redmond's fourth-class status. Two years later, on March 10, 1964, the Superior Court ruled that the incorporation was invalid for several reasons: the incorporated town was 4.5 square miles (12 km^{2}), but state law limited fourth-class towns to a size of one square mile (2.6 km^{2}); the town did not meet the minimum population of 300 required for the status; and the incorporation vote had taken place outside of the proposed town, in neighboring Redmond. East Redmond's government, then conducting a regular election, appealed to the State Supreme Court, who heard the case in early 1965. The State Supreme Court affirmed the Superior Court's decision on July 1, 1965, declaring that the town was illegally incorporated and thus invalid.

East Redmond became the second town in King County history to be dis-incorporated, following Ravensdale in the 1920s. The area remains unincorporated, as part of the Union Hill-Novelty Hill census-designated place.

== Geography ==
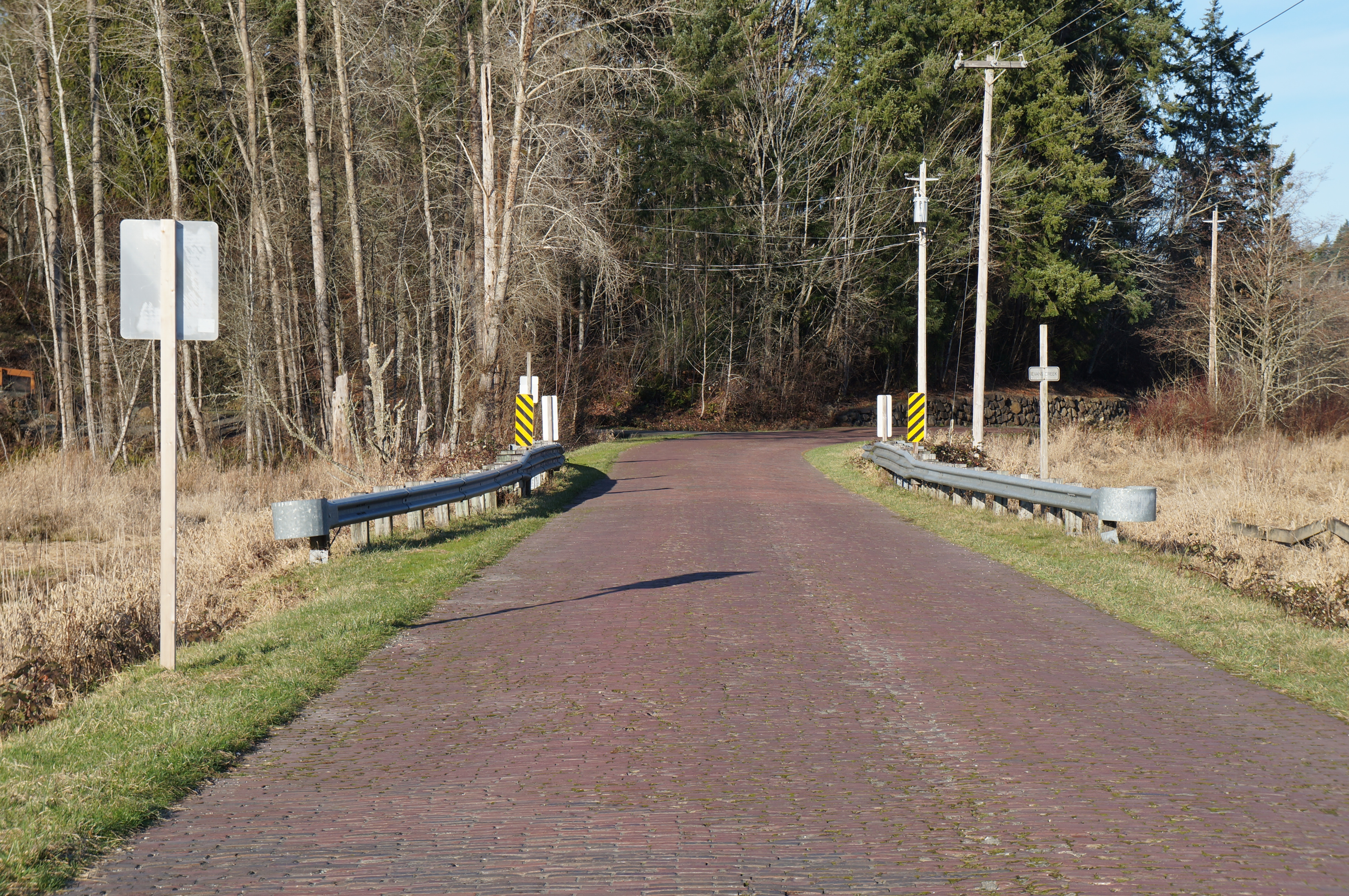
A preserved brick road in eastern Redmond

At the time of its incorporation, East Redmond had a total size of 4.5 square miles (12 km^{2}); it was three times larger than the neighboring town of Redmond. By the end of 1957, the town shrunk to just over one square mile (2.6 km^{2}), due to residents voting to dis-incorporate.

== Demographics ==
The 1960 census counted a population of 203 people in East Redmond.

At the time of its dis-incorporation, the population of East Redmond had declined to 185. An unofficial population count by the Washington Secretary of State in 1956 estimated that the town had 516 residents, but after the 1957 dis-incorporation vote, the town's population was reduced to 225 by 1958. The town was the smallest incorporated place in King County for most of its existence.

== Government ==
The town operated under a council–manager government, with a town manager and honorary mayor chosen from the five-member elected town council. East Redmond was the only fourth-class town to operate under the government, whilst others used a mayor–council government.

== See also ==
- Elberton, Washington, another Washington town which was dis-incorporated in the 1960s
