= Arthur Newsholme =

British public health expert (1857–1943)

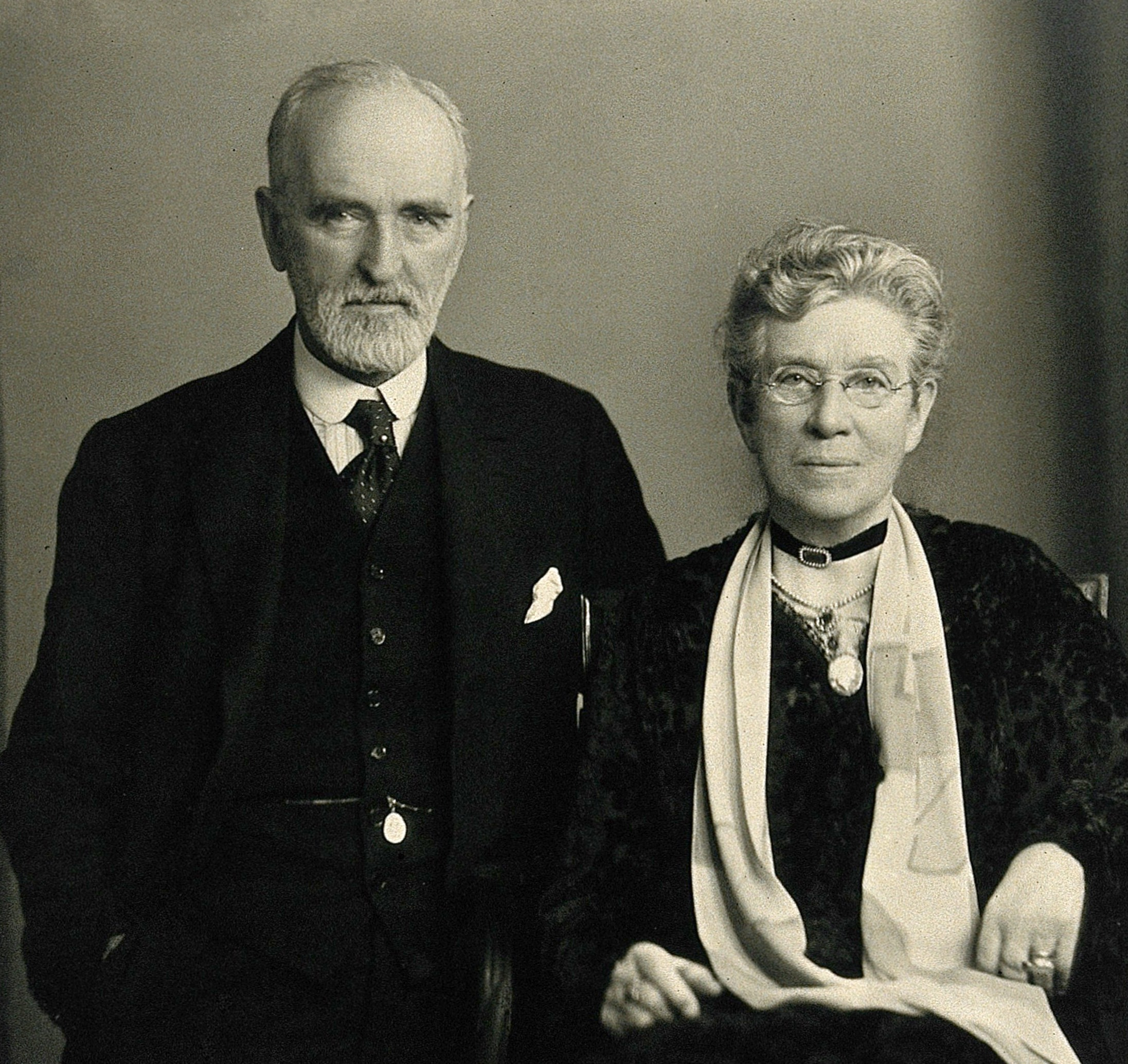
Arthur Newsholme with wife in 1931

Sir Arthur Newsholme KCB FRCP (10 February 1857 – 17 May 1943) was a leading British public health expert during the Edwardian era in the early 20th century. He is best known for promoting successful local health programs in his role as the Medical Officer of the national Local Government Board for England and Wales. He took the lead in legislation for national health insurance. After he retired, he published influential studies of international health systems as well as statistical and epidemiological studies.

== Personal life ==
He was born at Haworth and died at Worthing. He recalled talking with people who had known the Brontë family. He was educated in Haworth and Keighley; entered St Thomas' Hospital, London, 1875. He married Sara (nee Mansford) in 1881. They had no issue.

== Career ==
Newsholme strongly advocated improvement of public health by state intervention, such as national health insurance, sanitary measures, hospitals, and sanatoriums for the isolation of persons with contagious disease. Some of these proposals for public health interventions were described in a seminal paper in 1919, with the following abstract:

"There is much illness that might have been avoided if there had been an organized system of state medicine," says Sir Arthur Newsholme, speaking of England. He would give a freer hand to the health officer who measures up to the standard. England's chief defect lies in the existence of small and inefficient local health bodies.

Newsholme lived through a time wherein England, and many other countries in the western world, saw a demographic transition characterized by an exponential growth of the population since halfway the nineteenth century, which he explained both by a rise in fertility and mortality since the early nineteenth century, followed by a decline of mortality since halfway the nineteenth century followed by a decline in fertility after 1875. In his 1911 book on The Declining Birth-Rate he ascertained:

'There is no reasonable doubt that the decline in the birth-rate, which is one of the most striking features of the last thirty years, has been principally caused by volitional regulation of the size of the family.'

He realized that the decline in the birth-rate was both be seen as a threat and an advantage:

'The population question, in particular, is one in which thoughtful men have alternatively been racked by fears of depopulation or, at least, stagnation of population and the excessive growth of population.'

Although a decrease in birth-rate could (and would) eventually result in a stagnation of population growth, and although the reasons to volitionally regulate the size of the family may sometimes have been 'selfish', the effect will eventually be beneficial to the development and prosperity of the population. Time proved that he was right:

'It would not be fair to omit from consideration what is probably one of the chief factors tending to restrict families. This is the desire of parents with small incomes to educate their children more satisfactorily than they were educated, and to give their children the means for rising in the social scale.'

- Graduated MB, London, 1880; MD, London, 1881.
- 1884 appointed part-time Medical Officer of Health (MOH) for the parish of Clapham
- 1888 appointed MOH for Brighton
- conducted research in epidemiology, particularly relating to tuberculosis, scarlet fever, and diphtheria
- 1895 gave Milroy lectures at Royal College of Physicians on The Natural History and Affinities of Rheumatic Fever
- 1900–1901 President, Society of Medical Officers of Health
- 1908 appointed Principal Medical Officer, Local Government Board; served for ten years in this post, dealing particularly with tuberculosis, maternity and child-welfare, and venereal diseases
- President of the Society of Medical Officers of Health
- 1910–1919 Sat as crown nominee on the General Medical Council
- Examined for the Universities of Oxford, Cambridge, and London.
- Member of the executive of the Imperial Cancer Research Fund.
- 1914–1918 served on Army Sanitary Committee with rank of Lt Col, Royal Army Medical Corps.
- 1909 He moved to the Local Government Board, supported by John Burns (1858–1943)
- 1919 Retired from Whitehall; invited by W. H. Welch to lead the new School of Hygiene at Johns Hopkins University; many links with Russia.
- 1920–1921 Lecturer on Public Health, Johns Hopkins University; continued to write and lecture on public health, with visits to other countries, including the Soviet Union in 1933

Sir Arthur Newsholme's papers are held at the London School of Hygiene & Tropical Medicine Archives.

== Awards ==
- 1898: FRCP London
- 1912: Companion of The Most Honourable Order of the Bath
- 1917: Knight Commander of the Order of the Bath
- 1917: Awarded Bisset Hawkins Medal by the Royal College of Physicians

== Bibliography ==
- 1908: Alcohol and the Human Body (with Mary Sturge and Sir Victor Horsley)
- 1908: The Prevention of Tuberculosis
- 1919: Influenza: a Discussion (in cooperation with the Royal Society of Medicine)
- 1925: The Ministry of Health
- 1927: Evolution of Preventive Medicine
- 1929: The Story of Modern Preventive Medicine
- 1932: Medicine and the State with John Adams Kingsbury.
- 1933: Red Medicine with John Adams Kingsbury.
- 1935: Fifty Years in Public Health
- 1936: The Last Thirty Years in Public Health

== Publications ==
Hygiene (1884); School Hygiene (1887); The Elements of Vital Statistics (1889); `Vital Statistics of Peabody Buildings' Journal of the Statistical Society (1891); `The Alleged Increase of Cancer', with G. King (Proceedings of the Royal Society, 1893); Natural History and Affinities of Rheumatic Fever (Milroy Lecture, 1895); Epidemic Diphtheria: a Research on the Origin and Spread of the Disease from an International Standpoint (1898); The Prevention of Phthisis, with special reference to its Notification to the MOH (1899); `An Inquiry into the Principal Causes of the Reduction of the Death-Rate from Phthisis' Journal of Hygiene (1906); The Brighton Life Tables, 1881–1890 and 1891–1923; International Studies on the Relation between the Private and Official Practice of Medicine (3 vols, 1931); American Addresses on Health and Insurance (1920).

== Commemoration ==
A bus in Brighton has been named after him.

== See also ==
- History of public health in the United Kingdom

== Papers ==
- The Newsholme Archive
