= Robert Charleton =

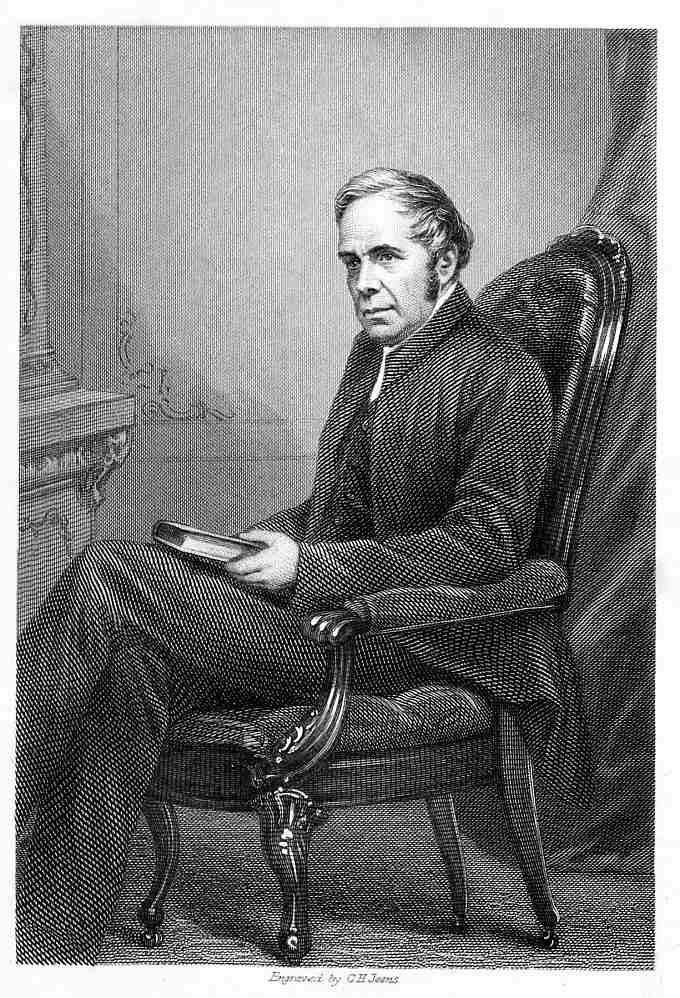
- Born: 15 April 1809; Bristol, England
- Died: 5 December 1872 (aged 62–63); Ashley Down, Bristol, England
- Movement: Temperance movement
- Spouse: Catherine Brewster (m. 1849)

Signature
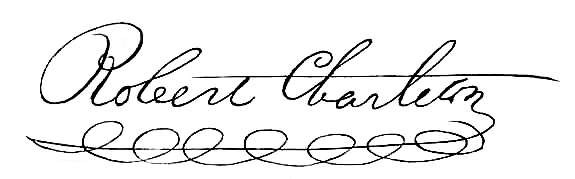

Robert Charleton (1809 – 5 December 1872) was a Quaker, Recorded Minister and a prominent citizen of Bristol, England. He was a philanthropist and ran a pin-making factory which was noted for its good employment practices. He was an advocate of total abstinence and peaceful relations between nations.

== Family ==
He was the son of James and Elizabeth Charleton of Bristol. James died at Ashley Hill, Bristol, in 1847. After a business training under H. F. Cotterell, a land surveyor at Bath, became the proprietor of a pin manufactory at Kingswood, near Bristol, in 1833, and continued that business until his retirement in 1852. He married, on 13 December 1849, Catherine Brewster, the eldest daughter of Thomas Fox of Ipswich. He died at his residence, Ashley Down, near Bristol, on 5 December 1872.

== Pin making ==
Robert Charleton ran one of the largest factories in East Bristol, at Two Mile Hill, Kingswood, from 1831 to 1852. It was inspected by Elijah Waring, the Sub-Commissioner for South Gloucestershire, for the Childrens Employment Commission (1840). The report describes the working condition of the workers, and the outworkers.

In 1841 Robert Charleton employed about 110 women and girls and 50 men and boys in the factory. In addition, about 500 women and girl outworkers were employed at heading and sticking. Pin making is an example of the survival of the pre-industrial system of outwork well into the Victorian years of factory based industrial organisation.

"Pin-making furnishes employment to a multitude of the poor population; the operation of fixing on the heads being carried on to a great extent by females, in private houses as well as in the manufactories".

He reported that the majority of employees in these two factories were young girls from 14 to 18 years old; no girls or boys under 12 were employed.

A few boys were employed in drawing and straightening the wire. The boys in Charleton's factory were all sons of men working in the factory. Some were employed directly by Charleton, others were paid by their fathers.

The Victorians were concerned that working class single women should be respectable. Girls who went out to work were in moral danger and were not being trained in the skills that they would need to become good mothers. To the emerging middle class, pinmaking was seen as suitable occupation for the poor, and suitable for women. Waring describes approvingly Robert Charletons strict moral control and his disciplined work force.

"The girls employed in pin-heading, are accustomed to take a share in the domestic labours of home; and when they become wives and mothers, are considered to fulfill their relative duties very respectably. It is, nevertheless, hardly probable, that they can be, generally, so well qualified for the economy of housekeeping, as girls who have been either in service, or in constant household training"

.

Attendance at Sunday School and the ability to read and write were taken as signs of moral respectability.

"The separation between the male and female workpeople, in these pin-manufactories, is perfect; and the proprietors, in both instances, reject any candidates for employment, who cannot bring with them a fair moral character".

Charleton was reported as believing that the women he employed were "respectable", and most of them were "virtuous girls".

He would fine his employees 3d for using foul language, and they were permitted to sing but only hymn tunes.

Robert Charleton built a school for the children of his employees. There was already provision for the education of the poor in the South Gloucester area at national schools, charity schools and Sunday Schools. Two-thirds to three-quarters of the working class was literate in the early 19th century.

Girls and boys paid 2d a week to attend the school and 1d extra for writing. Both boys and girls did reading, writing and grammar. Girls were taught sewing, and the boys geography and maths. The school rooms accommodated 120 boys and 80 girls. The schools at Kingswood and Oldland Common were mainly dependent on his support and superintendence, also the large British school in Redcross Street, Bristol

== Quaker belief and action ==
As a Quaker he wrote a critique of Barclay's Apology (1868). He was present in as a child at Congénies in the 1820s. He was a member of the Peace Society and was part of a peace delegation (1854) with Joseph Sturge and Henry Pease that went to Saint Petersburg to attempt to head off the Crimea War to present an address to the Emperor Nicholas at Saint Petersburg against the war. This address was graciously received by the emperor on 10 Feb (Illust. London News, 4 and 11 March 1854).

Again in 1858, in company with Robert Forster, he presented to the northern powers of Europe the plea for liberty of conscience issued by the Society of Friends. At the commencement of 1860 he was unanimously recorded by the monthly meeting of Bristol as an approved minister of the Gospel.

Henceforth his time was chiefly occupied in lecturing throughout England and Ireland. He was an advocate of the Permissive Bill, and much averse to the Contagious Diseases Acts.

== Temperance ==
He was involved with the temperance movement believing in total abstinence. He was one of the earliest of the advocates of total abstinence. He lectured on that subject in England in 1836, and in 1842 with his friend Samuel Capper in Ireland. At the same time he advocated the doctrines of the Friends, and in 1849 accompanied Capper in his tent-meeting tour in Oxfordshire and the neighbouring counties.

== Publications ==
- Opposition to the War an address, 1855
- A Lecture on the Protestant Reformation in England 1863
- A Brief Memoir of William Forster 1867
- Thoughts on Barclay's Apology 1868: Addressed to the Society of Friends : And Especially to the Members of the Meeting for Sufferings. Bristol [England] : Ackland & Son.
- Thoughts on the Atonement 1869
