= Georgina Sturge =

British quantitative researcher and author

Georgina Sturge (born 1988 or 1989) is a British quantitative researcher and author. She is a data consultant at the Migration Observatory, in the University of Oxford's Centre on Migration, Policy and Society (COMPAS). She previously worked as a statistical researcher at the library of the House of Commons. She is the author of two general audience books on the collection and use of data in government decision-making.

== Education ==
Sturge earned her bachelor's degree in English language and literature at Balliol College, Oxford (2011) and earned her MSc in public policy and human development from Maastricht University (2013).

After completing her MSc, Sturge worked as a researcher at the Overseas Development Institute, a global affairs think tank.

== Career ==
In 2018, Sturge joined the library in the UK House of Commons, where she was a statistical researcher, writing research briefing papers on migration and justice statistics to support members of parliament and their staff. She leveraged her experience in the House of Commons to write her first book, Bad Data: How Governments, Politicians, and the Rest of Us Get Misled by Numbers, which describes how politicians use national statistics to inform policy decisions and how often those statistics can be inconsistent, vague, misleading, or even wrong. Bad Data was generally well received by reviewers, although Snowdon suggested more details about some of the data discussed in the book would have been useful, and Guest was frustrated by the lack of solutions proposed.

In 2025, Sturge became a researcher at the Migration Observatory, in the University of Oxford's Centre on Migration, Policy and Society (COMPAS). She returned to the Netherlands to live and to work part-time at the Maastricht Centre for Citizenship, Migration and Development (MACIMIDE).

Her second book, Sum of Us: A History of the UK in Data, describes the collection of official national statistics from the Norman invasion to the present.

== Personal life ==
Sturge met her wife while studying at Maastricht University. They were married in 2022.

== Selected publications ==
=== Refereed journal articles ===
- Bastagli, Francesca; Hagen-Zanker, Jessica; Harman, Luke; Barca, Valentina; Sturge, Georgina; Schmidt, Tanja (2019). "The Impact of Cash Transfers: A Review of the Evidence from Low- and Middle-income Countries". Journal of Social Policy. 48 (3): 569–594. doi:10.1017/S0047279418000715.
- Sturge, Georgina; Bilgili, Özge; Siegel, Melissa (2016). "Migrants' capacity as actors of development: Do skills matter for economic and social remittances?". Global Networks. 16 (4): 470–489. doi:10.1111/glob.12117.

=== Newspaper articles ===
- Sturge, Georgina (6 January 2017). "Five myths about cash transfers". The New Humanitarian.
- Sturge, Georgina (7 November 2022). "From migration to railways, how bad data infiltrated British politics". The Guardian.

=== Presentations ===
- Sturge, Georgina (6 March 2024). "What's So Dangerous About Bad Data?". YouTube. TEDx London Business School.

== Bibliography ==
- Sturge, Georgina (2022a). Bad Data: How Governments, Politicians, and the Rest of Us Get Misled by Numbers. London: The Bridge Street Press. ISBN 978-0-349-12861-0.
- Sturge, Georgina (2025). Sum of Us: A History of the UK in Data. Little, Brown Book Group Limited. ISBN 978-0-349-12902-0.
