= Sophia Sturge (abolitionist) =

British slavery abolitionist (1795–1845)

- Born: 17 August 1795; Elberton, Gloucestershire, England
- Died: 6 June 1845 (aged 49); Edgbaston, England

Sophia Sturge (17 August 1795 – 6 June 1845) was a British slavery abolitionist based in Birmingham. She was a founding member of the Birmingham Ladies Society for the Relief of Negro Slaves and devoted much of her life to supporting her brother who was one of the UK's leading abolitionists.

== Life ==
Sturge was born in Elberton in Gloucestershire in 1795. She became an invalid, a victim, she said "of disease and medicine". She was the fifth child in the family of twelve of Joseph Sturge, a farmer in Elberton, Gloucestershire, and his wife Mary Marshall, who belonged to the Religious Society of Friends (commonly known as Quakers).

Her brothers included John Sturge, who became a manufacturer in Birmingham, and Edmund Sturge. The abolitionist Joseph Sturge was her elder brother and Charles Gilpin was a nephew. She and her siblings were taught by tutors but their mother had to decide what could be afforded and Sophia's requests for drawing and French had to be refused. However the children taught themselves by correspondence. Sophia read well and would discuss ideas by letter. She attended a school in Wellington, but did not enjoy it.

In 1815, she became housekeeper for her brother, Joseph Sturge, in Edgbaston, while he was in business with his brother Charles. In fact she joined the business for a time as their bookkeeper. She idolised her brother Joseph as he became one of the pre-eminent abolitionists. That world was on hold when he married Eliza Cropper in 1834 and she went off to be a governess. She returned the following year when Eliza died and she would remain at his house as his personal assistant and adviser.

The big debate of the time was not just when, but how, to end slavery. Many argued that it should be phased out, but Sophia and Joseph wanted it to end quickly and completely. Sophia founded the Birmingham Ladies Society for the Relief of Negro Slaves which although based in Birmingham, had national influence. She called on 3,000 households to ask for their support is boycotting sugar because of its links to slavery.

== Death and legacy ==
Sturge died in Edgbaston in 1845. She was cared for during her final illness by her brother, Joseph.

Her idolised brother married again the following year and his first child was named Sophia Sturge. She would be a leading peace campaigner.
