= Two Mile Hill, Bristol =

District on the eastern edge of Bristol, England

Coordinates: 51.463°N 2.519°W

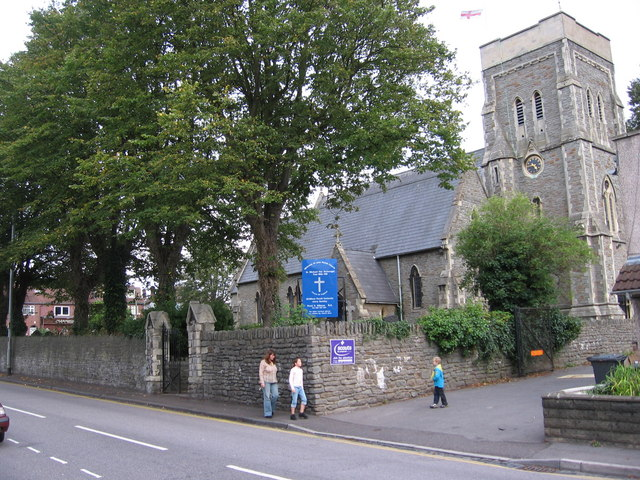
St Michael, the parish church

Two Mile Hill is a small district and parish on the eastern edge of the City of Bristol, just to the west of Kingswood which itself is in South Gloucestershire. Two Mile Hill Primary School is located in the area.

== Area ==
It is not known how the name for the area came about however it is speculated that it was done when the area was split off from the nearby St George's parish and based on Two Mile Hill Road that runs through it. The area used to house a retail outlet run by the supporters trust of Bristol Rovers F.C. It would mostly be used by fans for merchandise sales before matches at the Memorial Stadium as well as for ticket sales. In 2018, it was closed by the supporters trust due to lack of revenue and due to duplicating services already offered at the Memorial Stadium.

== Churches ==
The Church of England parish church is St Michael, on Two Mile Hill Road. The church was constructed in 1848 in the Gothic Revival style. St Michael's is one of Bristol's seven Commissioners' churches. In 1994 it was granted grade II listed status by English Heritage. Two Mile Hill was the location selected by John Wesley, one of the founders of Methodism, as the location for a Methodist school and preaching house. The area also housed the first Primitive Methodist Church chapel in the United Kingdom. It was opened in 1841 but was remodelled in 1849 when it was taken over by the Salvation Army.
