= Elberton, Gloucestershire =

Village in South Gloucestershire, England

Coordinates: 51°36′N 2°35′W

Elberton
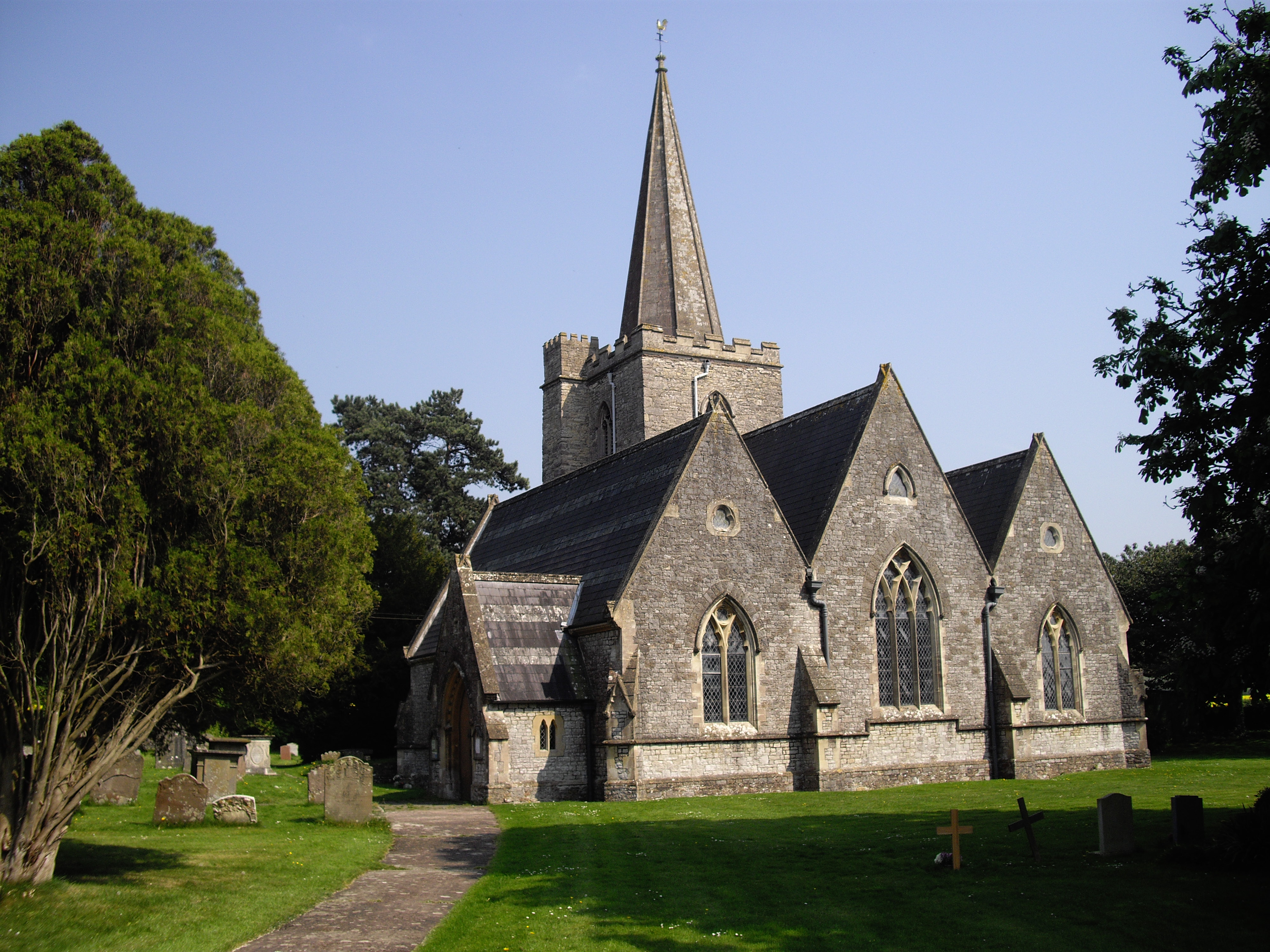
- St John's Church in Elberton

- Location within Gloucestershire
- Population: 99 (2011 census)
- OS grid reference: ST600886
- Civil parish: Aust
- Unitary authority: South Gloucestershire
- Ceremonial county: Gloucestershire
- Region: South West
- Country: England
- Sovereign state: United Kingdom
- Post town: Bristol
- Postcode district: BS35
- Dialling code: 01454
- Police: Avon and Somerset
- Fire: Avon
- Ambulance: South Western
- UK Parliament: Thornbury and Yate

Elberton is a village in the civil parish of Aust, in the South Gloucestershire district, in the ceremonial county of Gloucestershire, England. In 2011 it had a population of 99.

The village is located near the River Severn and the Severn Bridge, and is situated on the main road between the villages of Aust and Alveston. The nearest town is Thornbury and the nearest city is Bristol. Neighbouring villages also include Olveston and Littleton-upon-Severn.

Elberton is mostly a farming community, with a church, a village hall, and a garage.

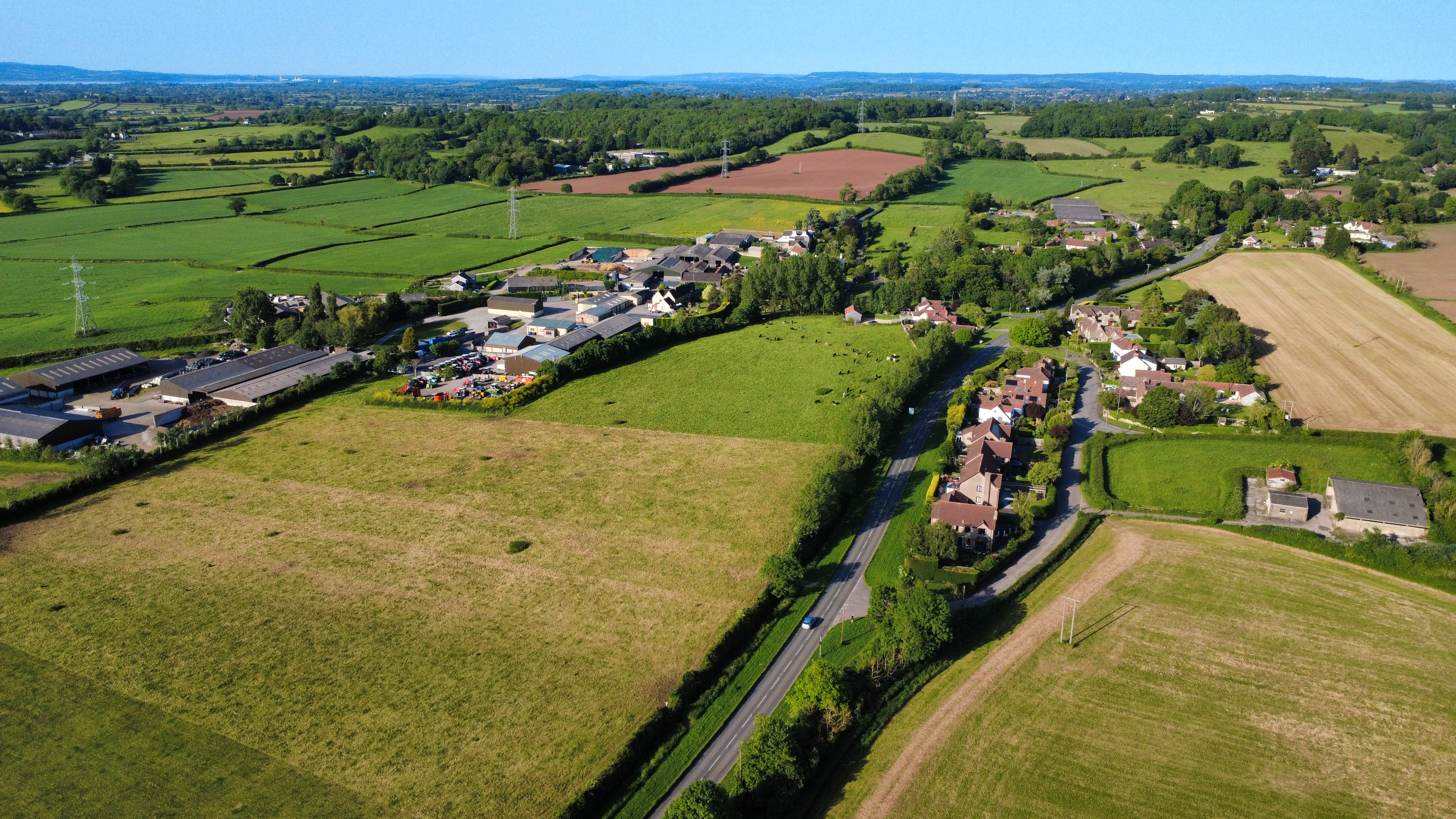
View of Elberton, looking NE.

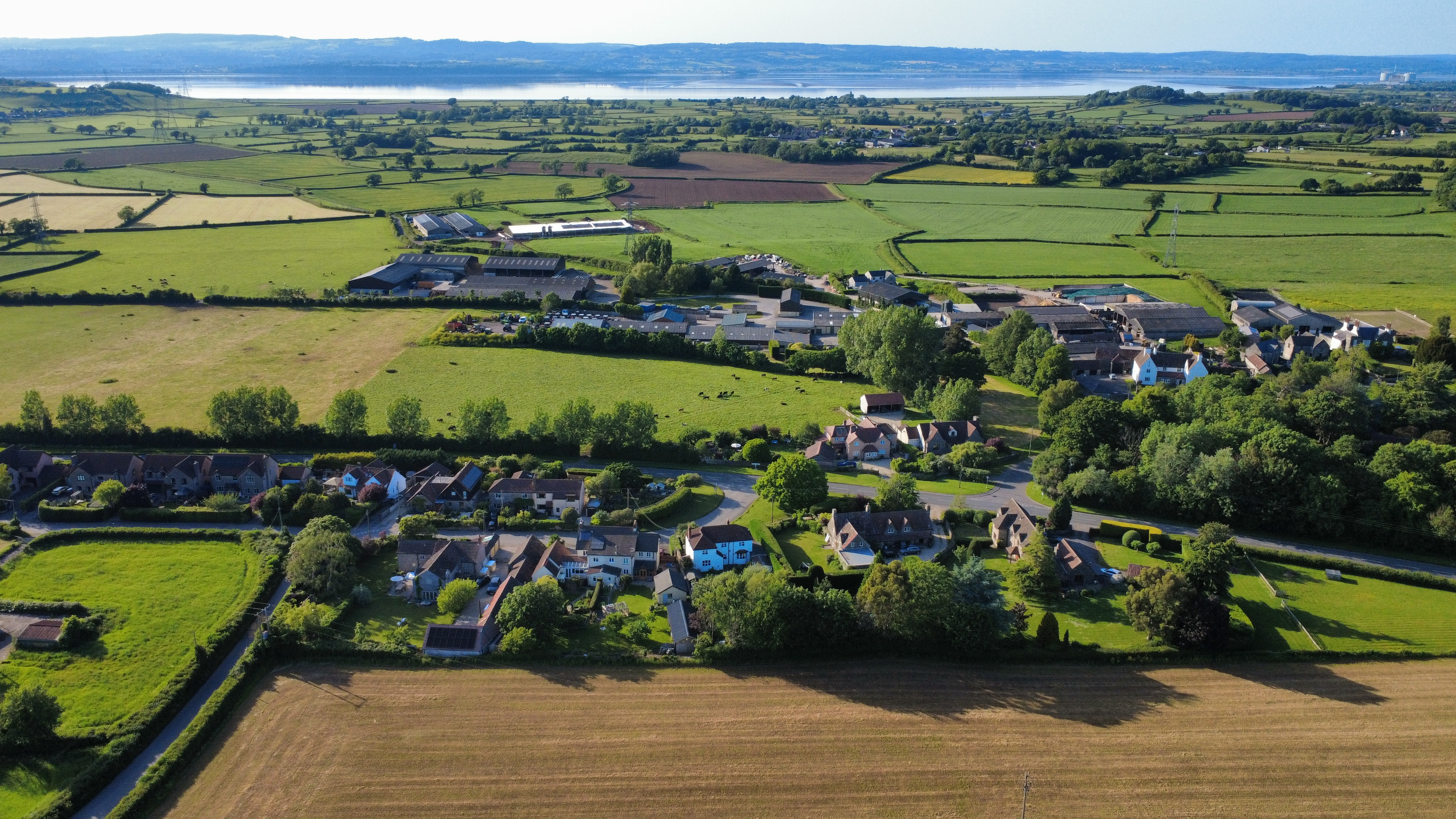
Looking NNW, with the Severn in the distance, Aust Cliff at left and Oldbury Power Station at right.

== History ==
The name Elberton means the farmstead of a man called Æthelbeorht. The name dates back to at least 1086, when the village was listed in the Domesday Book. In 1931 the parish had a population of 137. On 1 April 1935, the parish was abolished and merged with Aust.

=== Elberton Camp ===
The earthworks of an Iron Age defended settlement, Elberton Camp, can be found in the Vineyards Brake woodland overlooking the village.

=== Quakers ===
In 1654, in the wake of the English Civil War, the influential early Quaker preachers John Audland and John Camm held a meeting in the village of "1000 people". Elberton and neighbouring villages remained home to many Quaker families, such as the Goldney family who from 1674 owned Elberton Manor over multiple generations. The family later sold the manor to the Sturge family, who were also Quakers.

Later generations of the Sturge family included the leading abolitionists Joseph Sturge (1793–1859) and Sophia Sturge (1795–1845) who were both born in the village. Joseph Sturge purchased a sugar plantation in Montserrat and renamed it Elberton, hoping to demonstrate the commercial viability of a plantation built on free waged-labour, as opposed to slave labour. (Note: There is contradiction between sources on whether the plantation was purchased in 1837 or 1857.)

=== Quarry ===
On the edge of the village lies the former Harn Hill quarry, which has since been filled in as a landfill site. The expansion of the quarry in 1960s saw the demolition of a number of buildings, including the old vicarage. The landfill now serves as a source for biogas generation, producing 2.6MW for the national grid.

=== Miscellaneous ===
From 1799 to 1802 the Welsh antiquarian Edward Davies was curate to the village.

The organist and composer Basil Harwood composed a hymn tune named after the village.

== St John's Church ==
The tower of the Church of St John the Evangelist dates back to the 14th century, while the rest of the church was mostly rebuilt in 1858, and the spire refurbished in 2000. The graveyard includes a number of Grade II listed tombs.
