= Michael Sturge =

Michael Dudley Sturge (25 May 1931 – 13 July 2003) was an English experimental physicist best known for his contributions to solid-state spectroscopy.

He was born in Bristol to a family with a Quaker tradition and educated at Leighton Park School and Cambridge University. While his most influential paper is about discovery of excitons in gallium arsenide, the scope of his research covered wide field of solid-state spectroscopy, and its impact is reflected by establishment of the Sturge Prize in condensed matter spectroscopy.

After accepting the editorship of the Journal of Luminescence in 1985, Sturge drastically extended its scope by transforming it into a journal covering the extensive area of the contemporary condensed matter spectroscopy. He stepped down as chief editor in 1990. He died in Castleton, England on 13 July 2003, of leukaemia.

Sturge's achievements have been recognized by establishment of the Sturge Prize for scientists at the initial phase of their scientific career by the International Conference on Dynamical Processes in Excited States of Solids. The prize was first awarded in 2005.
