= Elberton, Washington =

Unincorporated community in Washington, United States

Elberton
- Unincorporated community, Ghost town
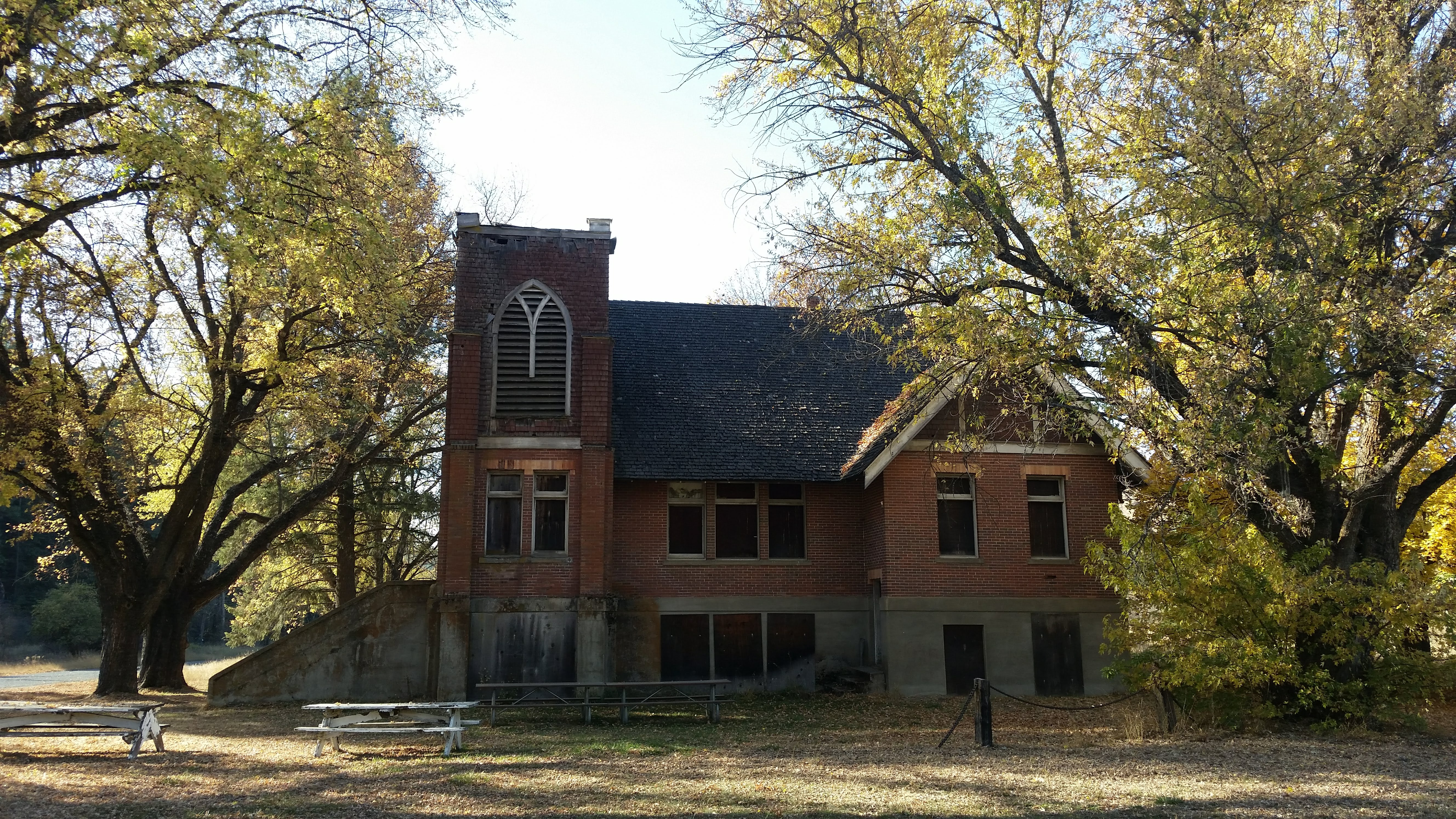
- Abandoned United Brethren Church building in Elberton

- Location in Washington
- Coordinates: 46°58′53″N 117°13′13″W
- Country: United States
- State: Washington
- County: Whitman
- Incorporated: April 24, 1896
- Disincorporated: January 14, 1966

Population
  - Estimate (as of unknown date): 15
- Time zone: UTC-8 (PST)
  - Summer (DST): UTC-7 (PDT)

Elberton is an unincorporated community on the north fork of the Palouse River northeast of Colfax and northwest of Palouse in Whitman County, Washington, United States. Due to the town's disincorporation in the 1960s, and a low-level population, it is also classified as a ghost town.

== Geography ==
The nearest cities to Elberton are Spokane and Pullman in Washington, Moscow in Idaho, and the Lewiston/Clarkston metropolitan area that spans the two states. It is in the middle of the Columbia River Plateau, in a region called the Palouse.

== History ==
Elberton was first settled by C.D. Wilbur. The townsite was platted in 1886, and named by S.M. Wait for his deceased son Elbert.

Elberton was incorporated as a fourth class town on April 24, 1896. It grew to have a population of 500 and at one time had a sawmill, a flour mill, a railroad (the Oregon-Washington Railroad and Navigation Company) that passed through and the world's largest prune dryer.

A major fire started in the town in the 1930s and due to the Great Depression, many of the businesses and homes destroyed by the fire were too costly to rebuild. The fire, along with the Depression hurt the town greatly and it started to decline in population, with people packing up what they could carry and abandoning their homes that they could no longer afford to keep and maintain.

In November 1966, residents of Elberton voted 15–5 in favor of dis-incorporation. Elberton became part of unincorporated Whitman County, Washington again within four years, when the county acquired the property of the town. As of 2005, Eleberton is the last instance of a municipality in Washington voting to disincorporate.

Currently, about 15 people live in the 200-acre (0.81 km^{2}) area that once was Elberton. Many of the original homes and buildings have gone or are partially collapsed. Remaining landmarks include United Brethren Church (built in 1913) and the Elberton Cemetery.

== See also ==
- East Redmond, Washington, another Washington town which was dis-incorporated in the 1960s
