= Hannah Sturge =

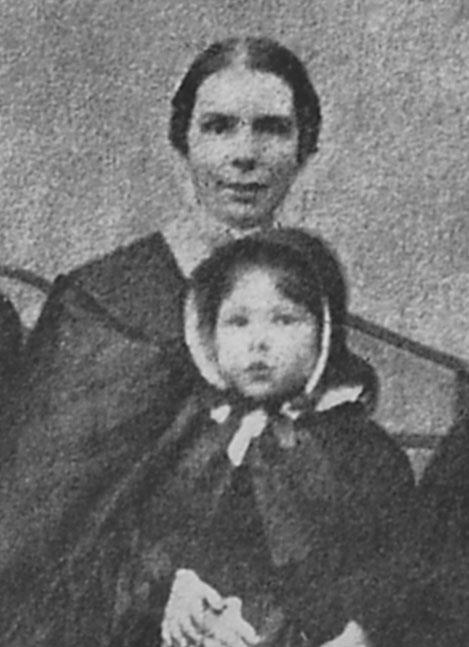
- with a daughter
- Born: Hannah Dickinson; 30 December 1816
- Died: 19 October 1896 (aged 79); Edgbaston
- Known for: philanthropy
- Spouse: Joseph Sturge
- Children: five

Hannah Sturge born Hannah Dickinson (30 December 1816 – 19 October 1896) was a British Quaker philanthropist. She and her husband Joseph Sturge were spoken about internationally as pre-eminent in both the abolition and peace movements

== Life ==
Sturge was born in 1816 to Edgbaston Quakers. Her parents were Ann (born Darby) and Barnard Dickinson and they were leading Quakers. Her mother was from the iron founders of Coalbroodkdale. Her father was able to retire when she was a teenager to devote himself to being a Quaker and good works. She had a pious upbringing.

She became the second wife of Joseph Sturge in 1846. He was over twenty years older than her and the brother of her sister's husband Charles Sturge. Her new home was at 64 Wheeley's Road in Edgbaston in Birmingham. She ran the large household and impressive visitors included Richard Cobden and Harriet Beecher Stowe. To support Stowe's work, she organised a "Penny Offering" at the Birmingham Ladies’ Negro's Friend Society. The Penny Offering went on to be known nationally.

Hannah's good works were limited by the society that she lived in. Six years before they married her husband organised the World Anti-Slavery Convention "for gentleman" in London. Women were only allowed inside under protest and none were allowed to speak. She was not as enthusiastic a Quaker as her parents but she was an active member of the Ladies' Temperance Association, the Free Produce Committee, a committee to improve the education of Jamaican girls, the Infirm and the Aged Women's Society. Joseph and Hannah Sturge were spoken about internationally as pre-eminent in both the abolition and peace movements.

In 1852 her father died and left her a substantial bequest of £1,800. Later she was able to use this to rescue her husband and brother-in-law's partnership when it was in financial trouble.

Sturge died in Birmingham in 1896.

== Private life ==
She and her husband had five children - Joseph, Sophia Sturge, Priscilla, Eliza, and Hannah. She became a widow in 1859 and she then brought up their children.
