= Melissa Siegel =

Melissa Siege
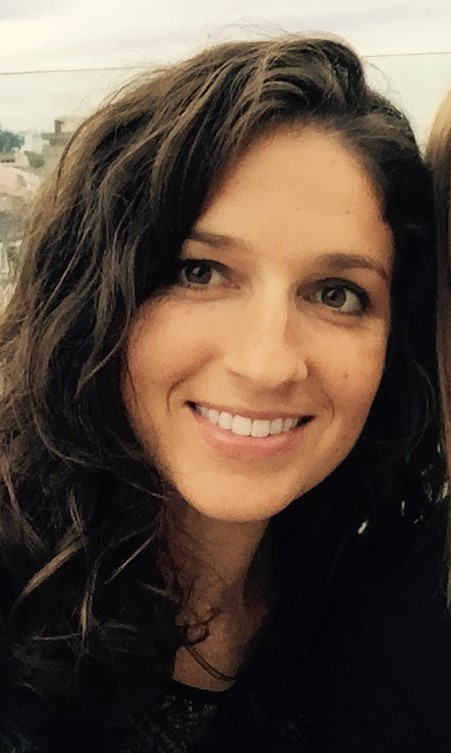
- Born: April 8, 1981 (age 45)
- Education: College of Charleston (B.Sc., Economics, Honors College, 2003) Utrecht University (M.Sc., Law and Economics, 2004 and M.A., Policy and Organization, 2005) Maastricht University (Ph.D. in Social Protection Policy, 2010)
- Occupations: Academic, professor
- Website: www.melissasiegel.org

Melissa Siegel (born 8 April 1981) is an American academic specialising in migration. She is professor of migration studies at the Maastricht Graduate School of Governance and UNU-MERIT where she has also been head of the migration and development research section since 2010.

== Biography ==
Melissa Siegel received a BSc in economics from the College of Charleston and graduated from the Honors College in 2003. In 2004, she received an MSc in Law and Economics from Utrecht University, as well as an MA in Policy and Organization in 2005. She obtained a PhD from Maastricht University in 2010 in Social Protection Policy.

Siegel is head of the Migration and Development research section of the Maastricht Graduate School of Governance and UNU-MERIT, which implements research projects and teaching programmes for policy makers. She is also co-director of the Maastricht Center for Citizenship, Migration and Development (MACIMIDE) at Maastricht University. Siegel currently holds the Chair of the UNU Migration Network and is a research associate at the Centre on Migration, Policy and Society (COMPAS) at the University of Oxford. She is also on the advisory board of the Migration Policy Center at the EUI and the International Institute of Social Studies in the Hague (ISS), and was formerly on the board of the Hague Process on Refugees and Migration. She has been a visiting research fellow at Harvard University, the Kiel Institute for the World Economy, and the University of Oxford.

== Research ==
Siegel's main research areas include:

- The effects of migration on children and elderly left behind
- The linkages between different forms of migration and multi-dimensional poverty
- The linkages between migration (including return) and development
- Remittance, effects, usage and channels
- Migration policy and practice
- Migration and corruption
- Migration and health

Siegel has a leading role in a number of Horizon 2020 research projects including Aligning Migration Management and the Migration–Development Nexus (MIGNEX) (2018-2023) and the Role of European Mobility and its Impacts in Narratives, Debates and EU Reforms (REMINDER) (2016-2019). She led the notable IS Academy project on Migration and Development (Migration, a World in Motion) (2009-2014), as well as the EuropeAid (EC) project on the Effects of Migration on Children and Elderly Left Behind in Moldova and Georgia (2010-2012).

== Select Bibliography ==
- Vanore, M., Mazzucato, V. and Siegel, M. (2015) ‘`Left behind’ but not left alone: Parental migration & the psychosocial health of children in Moldova’, Social Science and Medicine. 132, pp. 252–260. doi: 10.1016/j.socscimed.2014.08.040.
- van Houte, M., Siegel, M. and Davids, T. (2015) ‘Return to Afghanistan: Migration as Reinforcement of Socio-Economic Stratification’, Population, Space and Place. 21(8), pp. 692–703. doi: 10.1002/psp.1876.
- Naude, W., Siegel, M. and Marchand, K. (2017) ‘Migration, entrepreneurship and development: critical questions’, IZA Journal of Migration. 6. doi: 10.1186/s40176-016-0077-8.
- Siegel, M. and Luecke, M. (2013) ‘Migrant transnationalism and the choice of transfer channels for remittances: the case of Moldova’, Global Networks - A Journal of Transnational Affairs. 13(1), pp. 120–141. doi: 10.1111/glob.12002.
- Ruiz, I., Siegel, M. and Vargas-Silva, C. (2015) ‘Forced up or down? The impact of forced migration on social status’, Journal of Refugee Studies, 28(2), pp. 183–201. doi: 10.1093/jrs/feu035.
- Meshkovska, B. et al. (2015) ‘Female Sex Trafficking: Conceptual Issues, Current Debates, and Future Directions’, Journal of Sex Research. 52(4, SI), pp. 380–395. doi: 10.1080/00224499.2014.1002126.
