= Elberton, Montserrat =

Elberton
- Abandoned suburb
- Map showing location of Elberton
- Coordinates: 16°43′24.10″N 62°13′8.28″W
- Sovereign state: United Kingdom
- Overseas Territory: Montserrat

Area
  - Land: 0.11 sq mi (0.28 km^{2})
- Elevation: 200 ft (61 m)

Elberton is an abandoned suburb of Richmond Hill, St Anthony Region, Montserrat. It consists mainly of clearings and concrete car parks. It is abandoned because it lies in the 'uninhabitable zone' surrounding the Soufrière Hills volcano after the 1997 eruption of Chances Peak.

The suburb takes its name from a sugar plantation which was renamed as Elberton in 1837 by the owner, Joseph Sturge, after his birthplace – the English village of Elberton in South Gloucestershire.
