= Sturge Town =

- Town
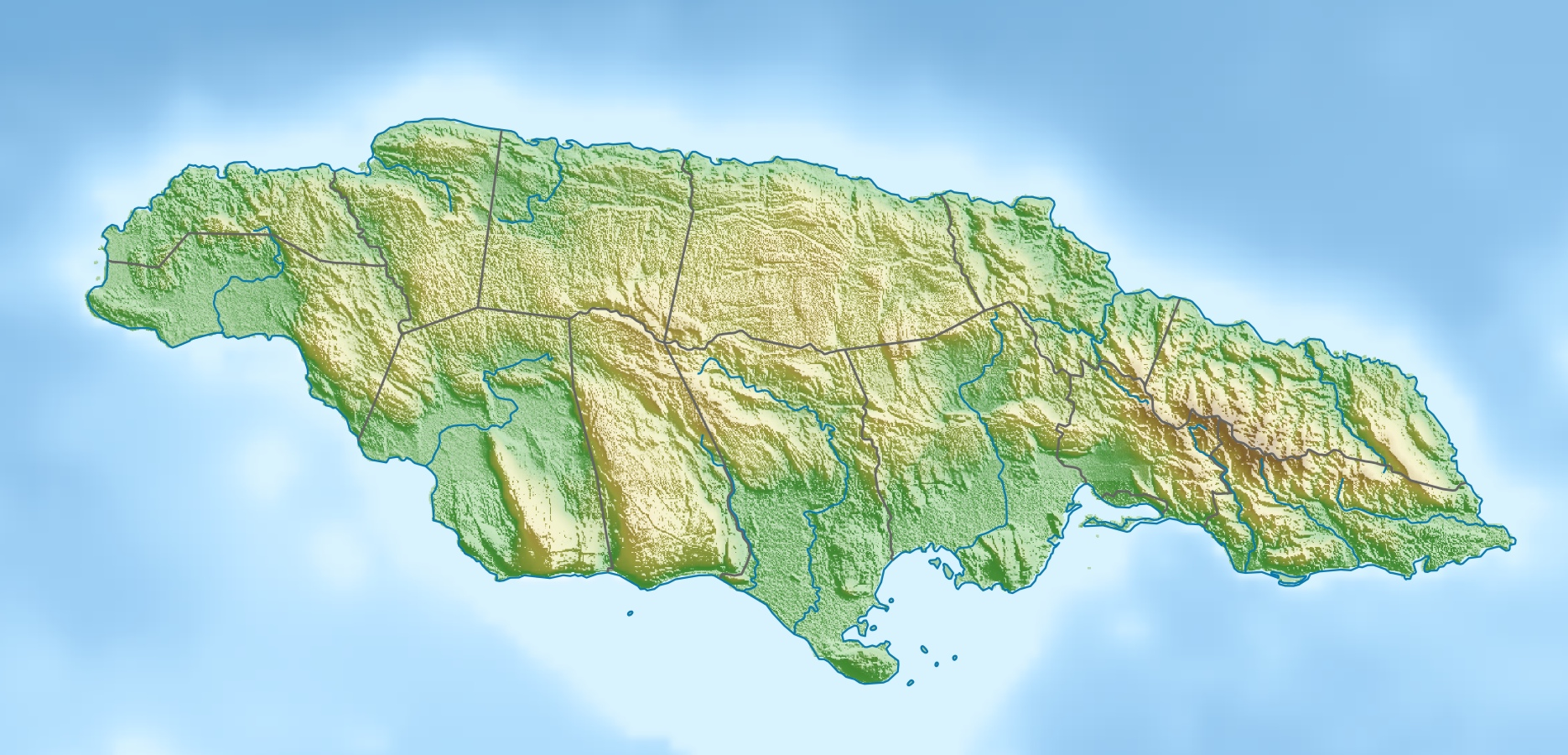
- Location in Jamaica
- Coordinates: 18.419465°N 77.313440°W
- Country: Jamaica
- Parish: St Ann
- Time zone: UTC-05:00 (EST)

Sturge Town or Sturgeville is a town in St. Ann Parish, Jamaica. It is located eight miles from Brown's Town.

== History ==
Sturge Town was founded in 1839. The settlement was founded by Baptists. It is the second Free Village to be registered, and was named after the English abolitionist, Joseph Sturge, who founded the British and Foreign Anti-Slavery Society. Sturge Town is the ancestral home of Kwame Dawes and Neville Dawes.

== Education ==
- Sturge Town Primary School

== Politics ==
Sturge Town is part of the Saint Ann North Western constituency for elections to the Parliament of Jamaica.
