= Ernest Adolphus Sturge =

American physician

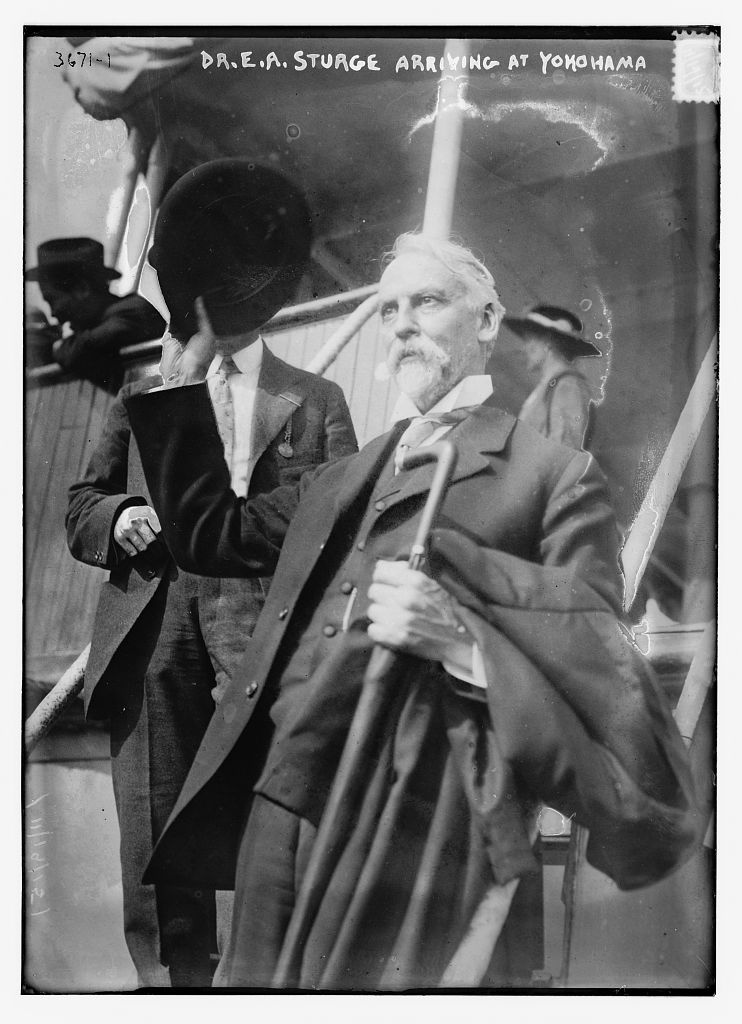

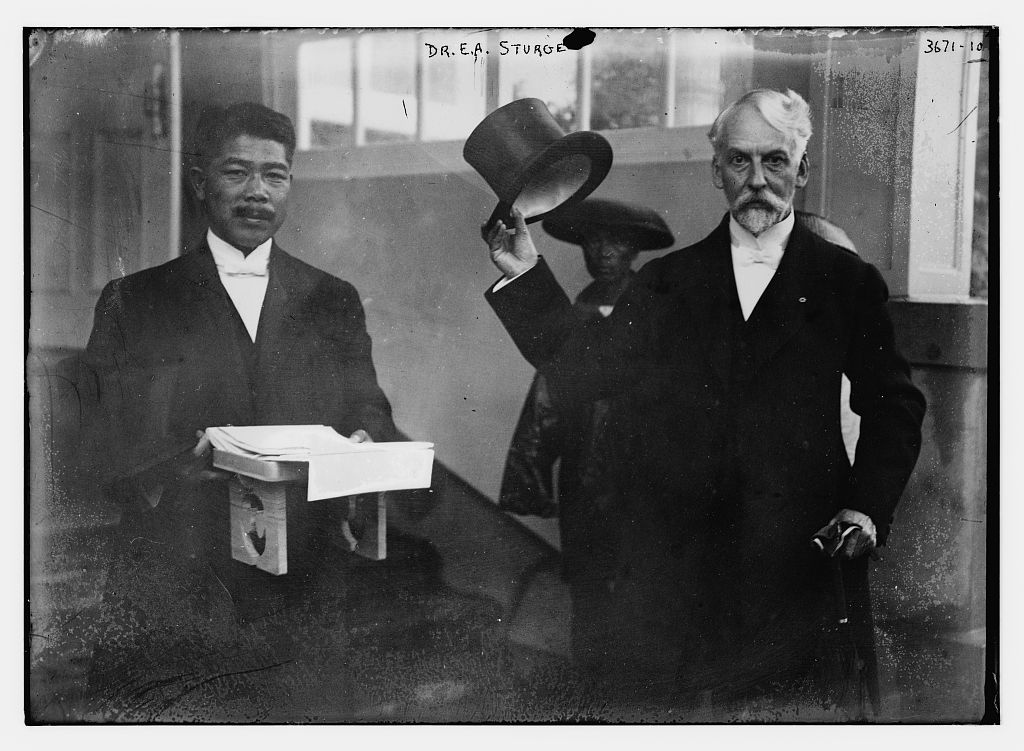

Ernest Adolphus Sturge (April 29, 1856 – October 11, 1934) was a physician and Presbyterian missionary who built hospitals in Asia. From 1886 to 1934 he was the General Superintendent of the Japanese Presbyterian Church.

== Biography ==
He was born on April 29, 1856, in Cleveland, Ohio, to Adolphus Sturge (1823-1894) and Caroline Harper (1822-1915). In 1867 his family moved to Bridgeton, New Jersey.

He received an M.D. and Ph.D. degree from the University of Pennsylvania in 1880.

In 1886, he was appointed as the superintendent of Japanese missions by the Presbyterian church.

In 1904 he received the Order of the Rising Sun from Emperor Meiji.

He died on October 11, 1934, in San Francisco.

== Works ==
- The Spirit of Japan: With Selected Poems and Addresses (1923)
