= Joseph Sturge =

English Quaker, abolitionist and activist (1793–1859)

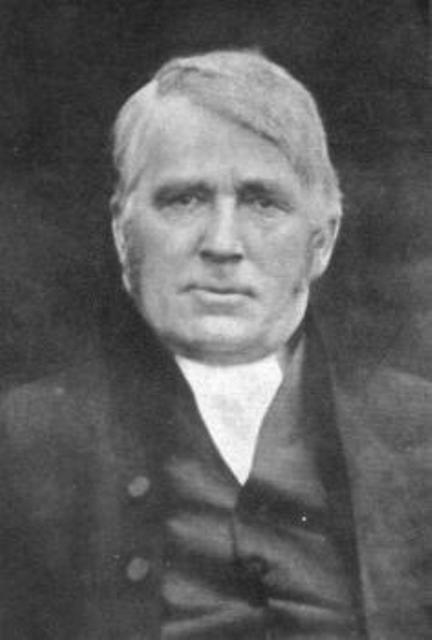
- Born: 2 August 1793; Elberton, Gloucestershire, England
- Died: 14 May 1859 (aged 65); Edgbaston, Birmingham, England
- Monuments: Joseph Sturge memorial
- Education: Sidcot School
- Known for: Founded the British and Foreign Anti-Slavery Society
- Spouses: Eliza Cropper (m. 1834) Hannah Dickinson (m. 1846)
- Children: 5, including Sophia Sturge
- Relatives: Edmund Sturge (brother); Sophia Sturge (sister); John Cropper (brother-in-law); Charles Gilpin (nephew); Thomas Sturge the elder (uncle); Thomas Sturge (cousin)

Joseph Sturge (2 August 1793 – 14 May 1859) was an English Quaker, abolitionist and activist. He founded the British and Foreign Anti-Slavery Society (now Anti-Slavery International). He worked throughout his life in Radical political actions supporting pacifism, working-class rights, and the universal emancipation of slaves. In the late 1830s, he published two books about the apprenticeship system in Jamaica, which helped persuade the British Parliament to adopt an earlier full emancipation date. In Jamaica, Sturge also helped found Free Villages with the Baptists, to provide living quarters for freed slaves; one was named Sturge Town in his honour.

== Early life ==
Born on 2 August 1793, Joseph Sturge was the fourth child in the family of 12 of Joseph Sturge, a farmer in Elberton, Gloucestershire, and his wife Mary Marshall, who belonged to the Religious Society of Friends (commonly known as Quakers). His brothers included John Sturge, who became a manufacturer in Birmingham, and Edmund Sturge. The abolitionist and pacifist Sophia Sturge (1795–1845) was his sister, and Charles Gilpin was a nephew.

After a year at school in Thornbury, Sturge boarded for three years at the Quaker Sidcot School. He then farmed with his father, and on his own account. Of pacifist views, he refused in 1813 to serve in the militia.

Failing at first to earn a living as a corn factor, at Bewdley from 1814, Sturge moved to Birmingham in 1822. There he became an importer of grain. Successful in business, with his brother Charles, he built up the company. The Sturges as a family became investors in railways and docks. Joseph from 1831 ceased to be an active partner, leaving operations to Charles, and concentrated on causes and public life. As an abolitionist, he was allied in 1831 with George Stephen in pressing Parliament for immediate legislation against slavery. The Reform Act 1832, in his view, failed to address poverty, and he worked for radical electoral reform.

Sturge was appointed an alderman in 1835. He opposed the building of Birmingham Town Hall, to be used for performances, because of a conscientious objection to religious oratorios. He became interested in the island of Jamaica and the conditions of its enslaved workers. He visited it several times and witnessed first-hand the horrors of slavery, as well as the abuses under an apprenticeship system designed to control the labour of all former slaves above the age of six for 12 years. He worked for emancipation and abolition with African-Caribbean and English Baptists.

In 1838, after full emancipation was authorised, Sturge laid the foundation stone to the "Emancipation School Rooms" in Birmingham. Attending were United Baptist Sunday School and Baptist ministers of the city. In 1839, his work was honoured by a marble monument in a Baptist mission chapel in Falmouth, Jamaica. It was dedicated to "the Emancipated Sons of Africa".

== Campaign against apprenticeship ==
After legislation for the abolition of slavery in the British dominions was enacted in 1833, slave-owning planters in the West Indies lobbied to postpone freedom for adults for twelve years in a form of indenture. Enslaved children under the age of six were emancipated by the new law on 1 August 1834, but older children and adults had to serve a period of bonded labour or "apprenticeship". Sturge led a campaign against this delaying mechanism. He was supported by William Allen, Lord Brougham, and others. In a speech to the House of Lords, Brougham acknowledged Sturge's central role at that time in rousing British anti-slavery opinion.

In 1834, Sturge sailed to the West Indies to study apprenticeship as defined by the Slavery Abolition Act 1833. He intended to open it to criticism as an intermediate stage en route to emancipation. He travelled throughout the West Indies and talked directly to apprentices, proprietors (planters), and others directly involved. Upon his return to Great Britain, he published Narrative of Events since the First of August 1834. In it, he cited an African-Caribbean witness, to whom he referred as "James Williams" to protect him from reprisals.

The original statement was signed by two free African-Caribbeans and six apprentices, and was authenticated by an English Baptist minister Thomas Price of Hackney, who wrote the introduction. Following another trip and further study, Sturge published The West Indies in 1837. Both books highlighted the cruelty and injustice of the system of indentured apprenticeship. They reported on the abuse of apprentices, and the way the treadwheel was used in prisons, and by 1840 changes had been made.

While in Jamaica, Sturge worked with the Baptist chapels to found Free Villages, to create homes for freed slaves when they achieved full emancipation. They planned the communities to be outside the control of planters.

He bought two plantations on the Caribbean island of Montserrat, Olveston, and Elberton to demonstrate that slavery was unnecessary.

As a result of Sturge's single-minded campaign, in which he publicised details of the brutality of apprenticeship to shame the British Government, a major row broke out amongst abolitionists. The more radical element were pitted against the government. Although both had the same ends in sight, Sturge and the Baptists, with mainly Nonconformist support, led a successful popular movement for immediate and full emancipation. As a consequence, the British Government moved the date for full emancipation forward to 1 August 1838. They abolished the 12-year intermediary apprenticeship scheme. For many English Nonconformists and African-Caribbean people, 1 August 1838, became recognised as the true date of abolition of slavery in the British Empire.

== International anti-slavery campaign ==
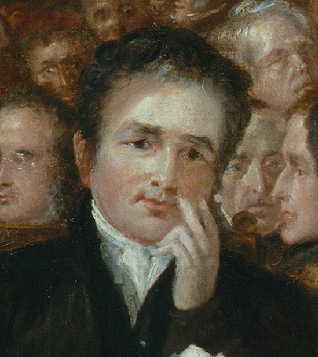
Sturge in the painting The Anti-Slavery Society Convention, 1840 by Benjamin Robert Haydon. From left to right: Vice Admiral Constantine Richard Moorsom, Sturge, John Keep (American delegate), Joseph Eaton. Top left G.K.Prince and top right, James Dean (another American).

In 1837, keen to act independently of the consensus in the Anti-Slavery Society, Sturge founded the Central Negro Emancipation Committee. More significantly, in 1839, one year after abolition in the British dominions, Sturge led a small group who founded the British and Foreign Anti-Slavery Society to put an end to slavery worldwide. It continues today as Anti-Slavery International.

The Society's first major activity was to organise the World's Anti-Slavery Convention. It was held at the Freemasons' Hall, London, from 12 June 1840. Others were held in 1843 (Brussels) and 1849 (Paris). It attracted delegates from Europe, North America, South Africa and Caribbean countries, as well as the British dominions of Australia and Ireland. It included African-Caribbean delegates from Haiti and Jamaica (then representing Britain), women activists from the United States, and many Nonconformists.

In 1841, Sturge travelled in the United States with the poet John Greenleaf Whittier to examine the slavery question there. On his return, he published A Visit to the United States in 1841 (1842). On the same visit (22 May), he saw William Jay, who was interested in forwarding the peace agenda, by international arbitration.

== The 1843 London Peace Congress ==
The Peace Congress of June 1843 held in London resulted from proposal made by Sturge to the American Peace Society in 1841, intended to propagate the ideas of William Jay. A preliminary meeting was held in London in 1842, and the decision was taken that the Peace Congress should follow directly on from the second Anti-Slavery Convention. Sturge ended up organising both, after the death of Nun Morgan Harry (1800–1842). The Peace Congress took place 22–24 June 1843, and formally was the responsibility of the London Peace Society.

The resolution of the Congress mentioned Jay's ideas positively, but laid more weight on those of William Ladd, who had died in 1841, proposing international institutions to keep the peace.

== Politics and Chartism ==
Sturge was critical of the role of William Scholefield, the Mayor of Birmingham, in the suppression of a chartist meeting in the Bull Ring, Birmingham. Schofield had arrived with 60 officers of the newly formed Metropolitan Police, on 4 July 1839. After Schofield read the Riot Act, Sturge held the police were responsible for the escalation of violence that led to the Bull Ring Riots, 1838.

In addition to his other commitments, Sturge joined the Anti-Corn Law League early in its existence. During 1842, he began a campaign for "complete suffrage", and had the support of the Christian Chartist pastor Arthur George O'Neill in Birmingham. His movement was based squarely on the middle classes. He envisaged a platform that could unite the League and the Chartist movement. The League would have nothing to do with it. Sturge had a measure of further Chartist and nonconformist support, but by the end of the year the Chartist leaders William Lovett and Feargus O'Connor had swung against him. O'Connor had supported Sturge's Complete Suffrage Union earlier in the year, before the industrial conflicts of the Plug Riots had hardened his attitude and he began to see Sturge's broadly middle class support as a threat to his leadership position.

Following a dispute over redrafting the People's Charter as a legislative bill, in December 1842 with William Sharman Crawford MP, Sturge walked out of a joint CSU-Chartist delegate conference in Birmingham. Crawford introduced their reform bill to "a small and bored House" in May 1843. The bill was lost by 101 to 32.

In the years 1842–7, Sturge ran three times for Parliament, on his "complete suffrage" platform, without success. In August 1842, he was parliamentary candidate for Nottingham, in a by-election. He was defeated by John Walter, the proprietor of The Times. In Nottingham he visited a Sunday School run by Samuel Fox. The idea of teaching not only scripture, but also basic skills such as reading and writing, was taken up by Sturge, who opened a similar school around 1845. In that year, he started an Adult School movement, in Birmingham, and took steps in 1847 to spread Sunday (First-Day) Schools among Quakers.

Sturge then contested Birmingham in 1844 as a Chartist candidate, in a by-election caused by the death of Joshua Scholefield. He was strongly supported at the election hustings, split the liberal vote, but ultimately came bottom of the poll: Richard Spooner [Cons] 2095, William Scholefield [Lib] 1735 and Sturge [Chartist] 346. In 1847, he stood once more, for Leeds, in the general election. There, he was identified as "Bainesite" — a follower of Edward Baines — and was campaigning for schooling, with no state involvement, a divisive position in the British and Foreign School Society.

== Later life ==
Sturge took up the cause of peace and arbitration being pioneered by Henry Richard. He was instrumental in the founding of the Morning Star in 1855 as a newspaper through which to promote the Peace Society and his other social ideas.

In 1854, Sturge and two other Quakers, Robert Charleton and Henry Pease, travelled to Saint Petersburg to see Tzar Nicholas I, trying to prevent the outbreak of the Crimean War. In 1856 Sturge and Thomas Harvey visited the Grand Duchy of Finland to investigate the damage caused by the Royal Navy and French Navy gunboats, in attacks during the Crimean War. On this trip Sturge bought Robert Wilhelm Ekman's painting Sunday Morning in a Farmhouse, which was shown in the exhibition of the Royal Academy of Arts in 1858. The painting was brought back to Finland in 1960.

== Personal life ==
Sturge married, first, in 1834, Eliza Cropper, sister of John Cropper. After her death, in 1846 he married Hannah Dickinson, daughter of Barnard Dickinson and his wife Ann Darby, who was granddaughter of Abraham Darby III; and they had five children, one being the peace campaigner Sophia Sturge (1849–1936). Fellow Quaker Stephen Henry Hobhouse wrote a biography in 1919 titled Joseph Sturge, his life and work. Joseph Sturge was a cousin of whaling shipowner, industrialist and philanthropist Thomas Sturge.

== Death and memorial ==
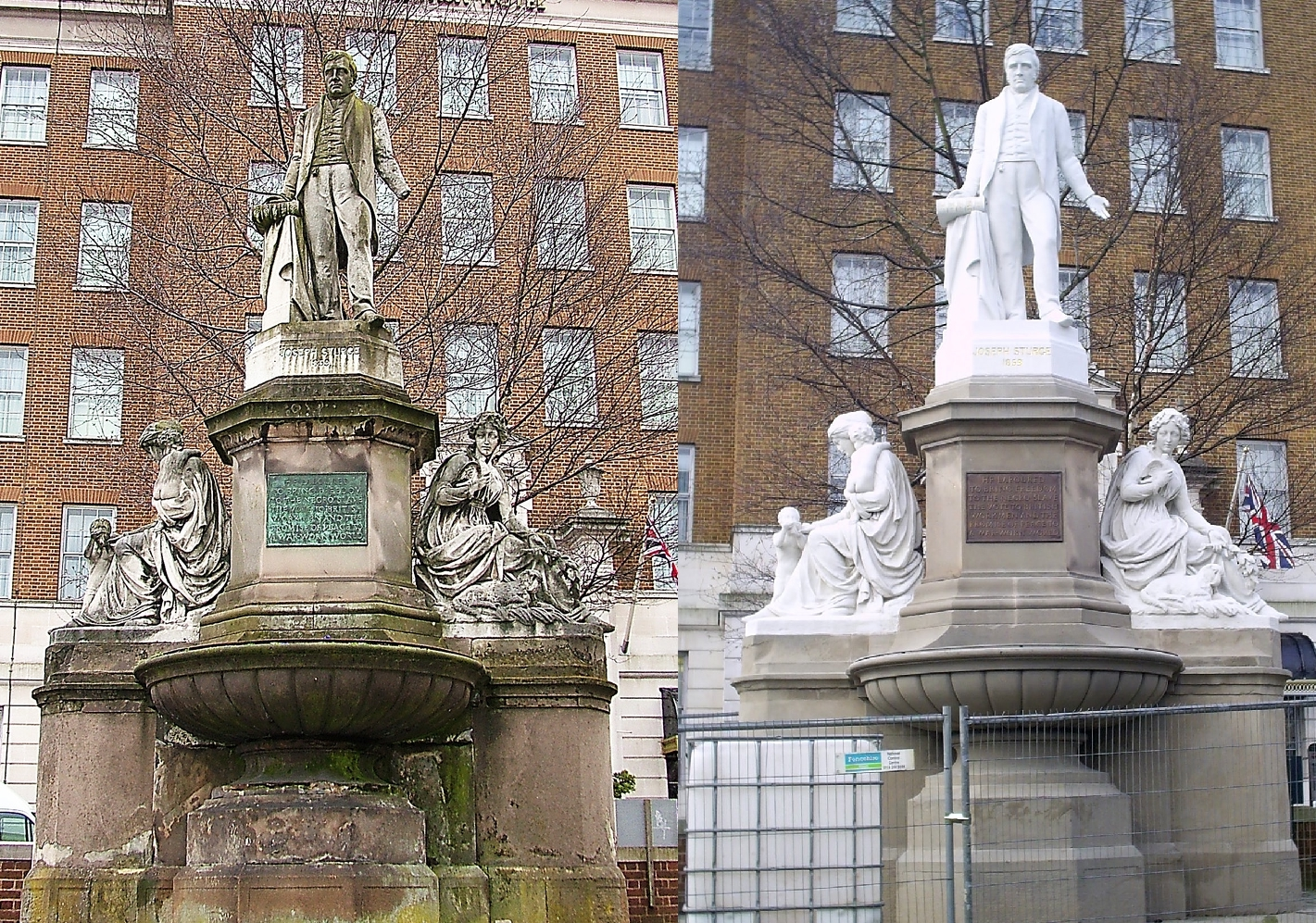
Sturge memorial before and after restoration

Sturge died suddenly at his home on Wheeley's Road, in Edgbaston, Birmingham, on 14 May 1859 of heart disease. He was buried in the graveyard at the Friends Meeting House, in Birmingham, England. Rather than a grand public funeral, the family sought a modest event in keeping with their Quaker beliefs; but the mourning procession from the late Sturge's home included forty carriages of friends and family, led by the mayor, Sir John Ratcliff.

The Joseph Sturge memorial by sculptor John Thomas was unveiled on 4 June 1862 at Five Ways.

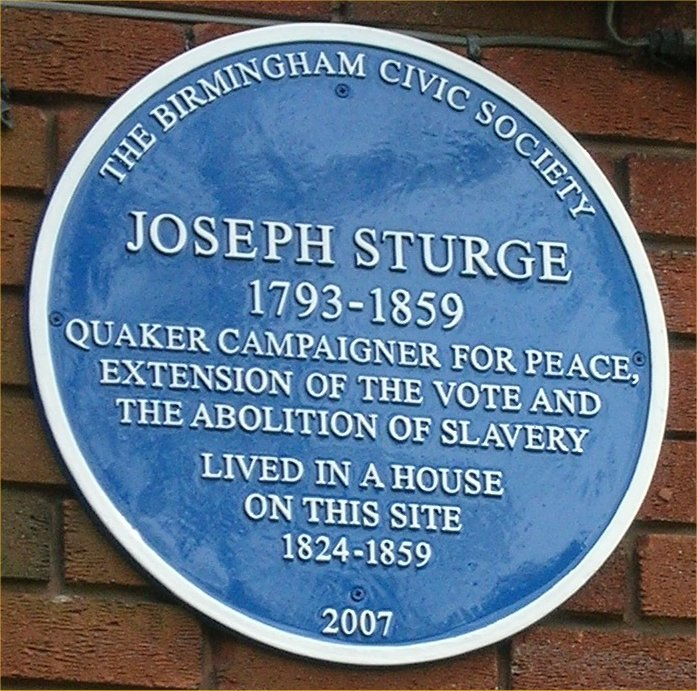
Blue plaque on Wheeleys Road

On 24 March 2007, the city held a civic ceremony to formally rededicate the statue. Randal Brew, the Lord Mayor of Birmingham, unveiled an interpretation board giving details of Sturge's life. On the same day, a blue plaque (historic marker) was unveiled at the site of his home in Wheeleys Road, Edgbaston.

Sturge Town in Jamaica is named after him. Sturge Park on the Caribbean island of Montserrat was named in honour of Joseph Sturge and his son. Also on the island was Elberton, a suburb named after Joseph Sturge’s birthplace.
