= Sophia Sturge =

Leading British Woman Pacifist in WWI

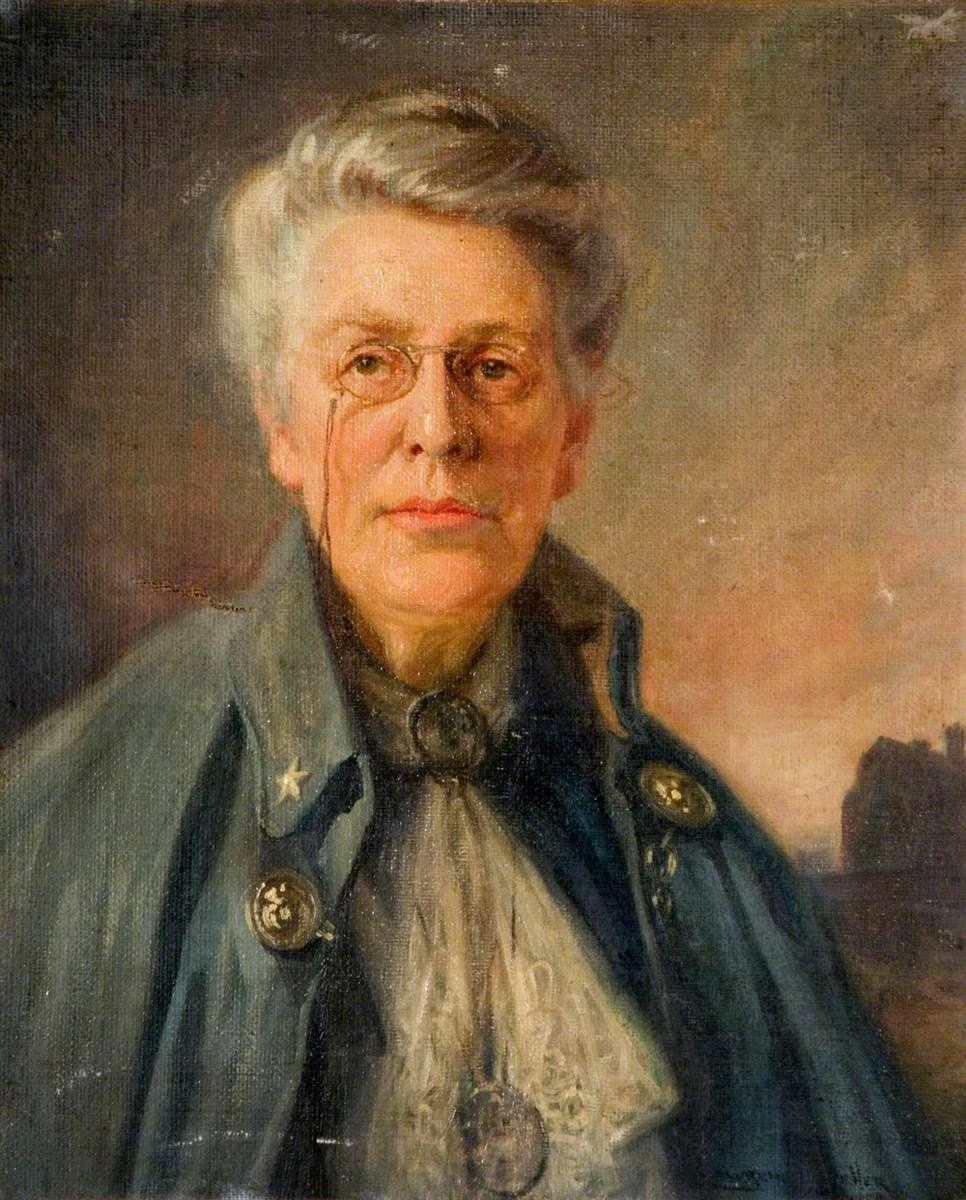
- Born: 5 January 1849; Edgbaston, England
- Died: 17 January 1936 (aged 87); Edgbaston, England
- Occupation: Social reformer
- Years active: 60
- Known for: Pacifism during WWI; Establishment of basket-weaving factory in Ireland

Sophia Sturge (1849–1936) was a British Quaker suffragist, social reformer and peace campaigner who carried out activities in opposition to World War I.

== Life ==
Sturge was born in Edgbaston, Birmingham, England on 5 January 1849. She was the first daughter of the Quaker abolitionist Joseph Sturge and his second wife Hannah Sturge born Dickinson. Her aunt of the same name was Joseph’s sister, and was, like Joseph, an important member of the anti-slavery movement. After an education at home, Sophia Sturge devoted her life to philanthropy and to attempts at reform. She was a pacifist who emphasised peace-making by women, worked with the Neutrality League to oppose WWI, initiated a programme to help enemy aliens in WWI and contributed to post-war relief for German children.

Sturge was a president of Young British Women's Temperance Association and a member of the Women's Liberal Social Council. She was a strong supporter of suffragism. As a supporter of the Irish Home Rule movement and appalled by the poverty in Ireland she moved to Connemara in 1888, where, with financial assistance from some Quakers, she set up a basket-making industry in the village of Letterfrack, which had already become a place of residence for several other Quakers. She taught young girls the art of basket-making, leading to a self-sustaining enterprise that sold many of its products in Britain. She lived there for seven years but then returned to England for health reasons. The factory continued to function under a manager until 1905.

By 1900 pacifism had become the main focus of her activities and she attended several international peace conferences. She opposed the Second Boer War and supported the campaign against it led by the Nobel Prize winner Norman Angell. Sturge became a member of the Union of Democratic Control, which was a British pressure group formed in 1914. While not a pacifist organisation, it was opposed to military influence in government.

On 7 August 1914, the British issued orders to detain all those considered to be dangerous. By the end of August, 4,800 people had been interned although many had been living and working in Britain for decades. On the day that WWI was declared, Sturge was travelling home from London to Birmingham when she saw queues of hundreds of Germans waiting to register as enemy aliens. She wrote a letter to Stephen Hobhouse, a fellow Quaker and prominent peace campaigner, to suggest that the enemy aliens would need help. Her suggestion led to the Quakers setting up the “Emergency Committee for the Assistance of Germans, Austrians and Hungarians in distress” (usually known as the Friends' Emergency Committee). Initially, the committee concentrated on finding people willing to provide employment to Germans who had suddenly been made unemployed; accommodation for those who had been evicted from their homes; and financial help. Many Germans who were reservists had been called home, leaving their British wives and children destitute. Sometimes the Committee helped people return to Germany.

In December 1914, a group of suffragists and social reformers, including Emily Hobhouse, Isabella Ford, Helen Bright Clark, Margaret Clark Gillett, Sophia Sturge and her sister Lily, and Catherine Courtney, Baroness Courtney of Penwith, addressed a letter through the International Women’s Suffrage Alliance, to the women of Germany and Austria urging them to join them in calling for a truce. Dutch suffragists, led by Aletta Jacobs, proposed holding a Women’s International Congress at The Hague. Sophia Sturge was on the Committee to organize British participation. 180 British women wanted to attend and 25 were given passports. However, they were barred from travelling by the British Government at the last minute and were attacked in the press as unpatriotic and pro-German. In the end, only three British women managed to make their way to The Hague.

After the war Sturge went to the Netherlands, where she helped German children affected by the war. She also spoke at many British schools and published several works for children, including The Children of Hunger, a collection of children's letters from Germany and Austria written after the First World War. Over time, she began to question her attitude to Quakerism, and she became a member of the Church of England. However, she resumed her Quakerism before her death, on 17 January 1936.
