= Eliza Cone =

Eliza Cone (66°55′S 163°12′E) is a rock with an archway through it standing 1 nautical mile (2 km) west of Cape McNab on the south end of Buckle Island, in the Balleny Islands. It is located adjacent to Scott Cone; the two features appear to have been named after John Balleny's schooner, the Eliza Scott, in which he discovered the Balleny Islands in February 1839.
