= Scott Cone =

Scott Cone (66°55′S 163°15′E) is a conical hill about 2 nautical miles (3.7 km) north-northeast of Cape McNab on the south end of Buckle Island, in the Balleny Islands. Located adjacent to Eliza Cone, the two features appear to have been named after John Balleny's schooner, the Eliza Scott, in which he discovered the Balleny Islands in February 1839.
