= List of shipwrecks in February 1825 =

The list of shipwrecks in February 1825 includes some ships sunk, foundered, grounded, or otherwise lost during February 1825.

== 1 February ==
List of shipwrecks: 1 February 1825
Ship	State	Description
Aurora	United Kingdom	The ship was driven ashore and wrecked on Walney Island, Lancashire with the loss of all hands.

== 2 February ==
List of shipwrecks: 2 February 1825
Ship	State	Description
Anne Eliza	United Kingdom	The ship was wrecked in the North Sea off the coast of Norway and abandoned by some of her crew. She was on a voyage from Leith, Lothian to Lerwick, Shetland Islands. Anne Eliza was taken in to a Norwegian port on 9 February in a waterlogged condition.
Aurora	United Kingdom	The ship was wrecked on the south of Walney Island, Lancashire.
Diligence	United States	The ship was driven ashore at Marshfield, Massachusetts. She was on a voyage from Martinique to Boston, Massachusetts.
Relief	United Kingdom	The ship was driven ashore at Bowmore, Islay, Inner Hebrides. She was on a voyage from Glasgow, Renfrewshire to Ballina, County Mayo.

== 3 February ==
List of shipwrecks: 3 February 1825
Ship	State	Description
Alliance	Sweden	The ship was driven ashore at Petten, North Holland, Netherlands with the loss of a crew member. She was on a voyage from Gothenburg to London, United Kingdom.
Ann	United Kingdom	The ship was wrecked off the Norderdyk, in the North Sea off the Dutch coast. She was on a voyage from London to Harlingen, Friesland, Netherlands.
Anna Christina	Sweden	The ship was driven ashore at Kijkduin, North Holland. She was on a voyage from Gothenburg to Alexandria, Egypt.
Columbus	United States	The ship was driven ashore near Vlissingen, Zeeland, Netherlands. She was on a voyage from New York to Antwerp, Netherlands. Columbus was later refloated and taken in to Veere, Zeeland.
David Owens	United Kingdom	The ship struck the pier at Prince's Dock, Liverpool, Lancashire and was consequently beached at Tranmere, Cheshire. She was on a voyage from Pernambuco, Brazil to Liverpool. David Owen was taken in to Brunswick Dock, Liverpool the next day.
Eliza	United Kingdom	The ship was driven ashore at Cuxhaven.
Happy Return	United Kingdom	The schooner was driven ashore and wrecked at Bude, Cornwall. Her crew were rescued.
Inclination	Bremen	The ship was driven ashore in the Weser. She was on a voyage from Bremen to London. Inclination was refloated in late March.
Lord Nelson	United Kingdom	The ship was driven ashore near Vlissingen. She was on a voyage from Antwerp, Netherlands to London. Lord Nelson was later refloated and taken in to Vlissingen for repairs.
Martha	Bremen	The ship was driven ashore in the Weser. She was on a voyage from Bremen to Lisbon, Portugal.
Maxwell	United Kingdom	The ship was driven ashore in Loch Ryan. She was on a voyage from Waterford to London. Maxwell was refloated on 12 February.
Seraphim	France	The ship was wrecked at Callantsoog, North Holland with the loss of a crew member. She was on a voyage from Gävle, Sweden to Marseille, Bouches-du-Rhône.
Spring	United Kingdom	The ship was driven ashore at Cuxhaven.
Unity	United Kingdom	The ship was wrecked at Bude, Cornwall. Her crew were rescued. She was on a voyage from Cork to Southampton, Hampshire.
Vriesland Welvaart	Netherlands	The ship was driven ashore on the south coast of Texel, North Holland. She was on a voyage from Harlingen, Friesland to London.

== 4 February ==
List of shipwrecks: 4 February 1825
Ship	State	Description
America	United States	The ship was driven ashore at Livorno, Grand Duchy of Tuscany.
Betsey	United Kingdom	The ship was wrecked at Llanelly, Glamorgan. Her crew were rescued.
Brancepeth Castle	United Kingdom	The ship struck the pier and sank at Sunderland, County Durham. She was later refloated but found to be severely damaged.
Christiana	United Kingdom	The ship was lost on the Hoyle Bank, in Liverpool Bay with the loss of all but one of her crew. She was on a voyage from Bangor, Caernarfonshire to Carlisle, Cumberland.
Edward	Prussia	The ship was driven ashore at Hellevoetsluis, South Holland, Netherlands. She had been refloated by 8 February.
USS Ferret	United States Navy	The schooner capsized in a gale off Cuba. Five crew killed.
Hendrick	Hamburg	The ship was driven ashore on Vlieland, Friesland, Netherlands. Her crew were rescued. She was on a voyage from Hamburg to London, United Kingdom.
Mary	United Kingdom	The ship was wrecked on the West Barrow Sand, in the North Sea off the coast of Essex. Her crew were rescued.
Minet	Sweden	The ship was driven ashore on Rottumeroog, Groningen, Netherlands with the loss of a crew member. She was on a voyage from Gothenburg to Guernsey, Channel Islands.
Neptune	United Kingdom	The ship foundered in Cardigan Bay off Barmouth, Caernarfonshire. She was on a voyage from New Orleans, Louisiana to Liverpool, Lancashire.
Paragon	United Kingdom	The ship was wrecked on the Cross Sand, in the North Sea off the coast of Norfolk. She was on a voyage from Dunbar, Lothian to London.
Ranger	United Kingdom	The ship was driven ashore at Longhope, Orkney Islands. She was on a voyage from Peterhead, Aberdeenshire to Liverpool.
Somers	United States	The ship was driven ashore at Hellevoetsluis. She had been refloated by 8 February.
Thomas & Eleanor	United Kingdom	The ship was driven ashore at Dunkirk, Nord, France. Four of her crew and a pilot were rescued.
Vrow Catharina	Hamburg	The ship was driven ashore on Vlieland. Her crew were rescued. She was on a voyage from Hamburg to London.

== 5 February ==
List of shipwrecks: 5 February 1825
Ship	State	Description
Concord	United Kingdom	The ship capsized and was severely damaged at Howden, Yorkshire. She was refloated and beached.
Four Sisters	United Kingdom	The ship was wrecked 20 nautical miles (37 km) north of Dieppe, Seine-Inférieure, France with the loss of three of her crew . She was on a voyage from London to Malta and Smyrna, Ottoman Empire.
Helen	United Kingdom	The sloop was wrecked at Sunderland, County Durham Her crew were rescued. She was on a voyage from Dunbar, Lothian to Sunderland.
Virginia	United States	The ship was driven ashore at Wijk aan Zee, North Holland, Netherlands. She was on a voyage from Baltimore, Maryland to Rotterdam, South Holland, Netherlands.
Woodbine	United States	The ship was abandoned in the Atlantic Ocean. She was on a voyage from Rotterdam, South Holland, Netherlands to Philadelphia, Pennsylvania.

== 6 February ==
List of shipwrecks: 6 February 1825
Ship	State	Description
Albrecht	Sweden	The ship was driven ashore at Havre de Grâce, Seine-Inférieure, France. She was on a voyage from Stockholm to Havre de Grâce. Albrecht was later refloated.
Ann	United Kingdom	The ship was driven ashore on Ameland, Friesland, Netherlands. Her crew were rescued. She was on a voyage from Hull, Yorkshire to Antwerp, Netherlands.Ann was refloated in June and taken in to Harlingen, Friesland for repairs.
Prince Coburg	United Kingdom	The ship was driven ashore at Whitstable, Kent.

== 7 February ==
List of shipwrecks: 7 February 1825
Ship	State	Description
Caledonia	United Kingdom	The ship ran aground on the North Bank, in Liverpool Bay and was severely damaged. She was on a voyage from Liverpool, Lancashire to Demerara. Caledonia was refloated and taken back to Liverpool.
James & Mary	United Kingdom	The ship was driven ashore and wrecked near Calais, France. She was on a voyage from Sunderland, County Durham to Rye, Sussex.
Mary Ann	United States	The ship was abandoned in the Atlantic Ocean. She was on a voyage from Portsmouth, New Hampshire to Demerara.
Point a Pitre	France	The ship was wrecked on the Florida Reef. Her crew were rescued. She was on a voyage from New Orleans, Louisiana, United States to Bordeaux, Gironde.
Venus	Sweden	The ship was driven ashore and wrecked near Calais. She was on a voyage from Gothenburg to Livorno, Grand Duchy of Tuscany.
Vernugsamkeit	Prussia	The galiot was wrecked near Hoorn, North Holland, Netherlands with the loss of all hands. She was on a voyage from Swinemünde to Schiedam, South Holland, Netherlands.

== 8 February ==
List of shipwrecks: 8 February 1825
Ship	State	Description
Farmer	United Kingdom	The ship was driven ashore in the Inner Hebrides. She was on a voyage from Glasgow, Renfrewshire to Ballina, County Mayo.
Haabet	Netherlands	The ship was run down and sunk off Cape Finisterre, Spain by Corsair (United Kingdom). Her crew were rescued. She was on a voyage from Bandol, Spain to Rotterdam, South Holland.
Nancy	United Kingdom	The schooner foundered in the Gulf of Mexico off Tampico, Mexico.
Ocean	United Kingdom	The ship ran aground 1 nautical mile (1,900 m) off Bamburgh, Northumberland.

== 9 February ==
List of shipwrecks: 9 February 1825
Ship	State	Description
George	United Kingdom	The ship ran aground on the Sow and Pigs Rocks, in the North Sea off the coast of Northumberland. She was later refloated and taken in to Blyth, Northumberland for repairs.
Haabet	Netherlands	The ship was run down and sunk off Cape Finisterre, Spain by Corsair (United Kingdom). Her crew were rescued by Corsair. She was on a voyage from Bandol, Var, France to Rotterdam, South Holland.
Neptune	United Kingdom	The brig was driven ashore on Texel, North Holland, Netherlands and was abandoned by her crew.
Superior Hope	United States	The ship was driven ashore at Sandy Hook, New Jersey. She was on a voyage from Jacmel, Haiti to New York.
Trumbull	United States	The ship was driven ashore at Sandy Hook. She was on a voyage from Trinidad to New York.

== 10 February ==
List of shipwrecks: 10 February 1825
Ship	State	Description
Unity	United Kingdom	The ship was wrecked at Bude, Cornwall. All six people on board were rescued. She was on a voyage from Cork to St. Ives, Cornwall.

== 11 February ==
List of shipwrecks: 11 February 1825
Ship	State	Description
Euphemia	United Kingdom	The ship was abandoned in the North Sea off Texel, North Holland, Netherlands. Her crew were rescued by a Dutch fishing vessel.

== 12 February ==
List of shipwrecks: 12 February 1825
Ship	State	Description
Good Hope	United Kingdom	The ship was driven ashore at Carolinensiel, Grand Duchy of Oldenburg. She was on a voyage from Bremen to Amsterdam, North Holland, Netherlands.
Mangles	United Kingdom	The ship was reported wrecked on the South Head Reef, off Sydney, New South Wales. She was on a voyage from Sydney to an English port. Actually, she continued on her voyage seven hours after the incident.

== 14 February ==
List of shipwrecks: 14 February 1825
Ship	State	Description
Derwent	United Kingdom	The collier was driven ashore at Old Hall, Yorkshire. She was refloated on the following tide.
Ferino	United Kingdom	The collier was driven ashore at "Helderthorp", Yorkshire. She was refloated on the following tide.
Martha	United Kingdom	The collier was driven ashore at Flamborough Head, Yorkshire. She was refloated on the following tide.
Nymph	United Kingdom	The ship struck a reef and was wrecked 1 nautical mile (1.9 km) south of Coquet Island, Northumberland. Her crew were rescued. She was on a voyage from Sunderland, County Durham to Aberdeen.
Vrow Elena	Netherlands	The ship was stranded on the Schildyk. She was on a voyage from Rotterdam, South Holland to Hamburg.
William Cossar	(United Kingdom of Great Britain and Ireland) New South Wales	The schooner was wrecked on the Sow and Pigs Reef, in Sydney Harbour.

== 15 February ==
List of shipwrecks: 15 February 1825
Ship	State	Description
Catharine	United Kingdom	The ship ran aground south of Cullercoats, County Durham and was damaged. She was on a voyage from London to South Shields, County Durham. Catharine was later refloated and towed in to South Shields.

== 17 February ==
List of shipwrecks: 17 February 1825
Ship	State	Description
Doris	(Russian Empire) Grand Duchy of Tuscany	The ship was driven ashore on Vlieland, Friesland, Netherlands. She was on a voyage from Oulu to London, United Kingdom.
John & Joseph	United Kingdom	The ship struck a rock at Holyhead, Anglesey and was severely damaged. She was on a voyage from Liverpool, Lancashire to Plymouth, Devon.
Lovenso	Portugal	The ship was driven ashore south of Baltimore, Maryland, United States.
HMS Pike	Royal Navy	The schooner was driven ashore on the coast of Sierra Leone.
Rapid	United Kingdom	The ship was driven ashore and wrecked at Buenos Aires. Argentina.
Vrow Engelina	Netherlands	The ship was wrecked on Ameland, Friesland. She was on a voyage from Mandahl, Norway to Amsterdam, North Holland.

== 19 February ==
List of shipwrecks: 19 February 1825
Ship	State	Description
Eliza & Mary	United Kingdom	The ship was wrecked on the Île à Vache, Haiti. She was on a voyage from Liverpool to Saint Domingo.

== 21 February ==
List of shipwrecks: 21 February 1825
Ship	State	Description
Caroline	United Kingdom	The ship capsized at Kilrush, County Clare and was severely damaged. She was on a voyage from Limerick to Cardiff, Glamorgan.

== 23 February ==
List of shipwrecks: 23 February 1825
Ship	State	Description
Thetis	United Kingdom	The ship was driven ashore and wrecked near the mouth of the Palmones River, Spain. She was on a voyage from Buenos Aires, Argentina to Gibraltar.

== 25 February ==
List of shipwrecks: 25 February 1825
Ship	State	Description
General Brock	United Kingdom	The ship was destroyed by fire in the Delaware River with the loss of three of her crew.
Princess of Wales	United Kingdom	The cutter on the Bahia Honda Key, Florida Territory. Hr crew were rescued.

== 26 February ==
List of shipwrecks: 26 February 1825
Ship	State	Description
Otto	Prussia	The ship was wrecked on Terschelling, Friesland, Netherlands. She was on a voyage from Königsberg to Amsterdam, North Holland, Netherlands.

== 27 February ==
List of shipwrecks: 27 February 1825
Ship	State	Description
Herring	United Kingdom	The ship was driven ashore at Great Yarmouth, Norfolk. She was on a voyage from Newcastle upon Tyne, Northumberland to Great Yarmouth.
Resolution	Hamburg	The ship was wrecked at Haroldswick, Unst, Shetland Islands, United Kingdom with the loss of all but one of her crew.
Rosneath Castle	United Kingdom	The ship was driven ashore and wrecked on Islay, Inner Hebrides. She was on a voyage from Dumbarton to Belfast, County Antrim.

== 28 February ==
List of shipwrecks: 28 February 1825
Ship	State	Description
Alicia	United Kingdom	The ship was driven ashore at Châtillon. She was on a voyage from Bristol, Gloucestershire to the Charente. She was refloated on 10 March and taken in to Rochefort, Charente-Maritime, France.
Chebucto	United Kingdom	The brig was driven ashore at Liverpool, Nova Scotia, British North America.
Constitution	United Kingdom	The ship was driven ashore 6 nautical miles (11 km) north of Lytham St. Annes, Lancashire. She was on a voyage from London to Preston, Lancashire.
Resolution	Hamburg	The ship was wrecked on Uist, Outer Hebrides, United Kingdom with the loss of all but one of her crew.

== Unknown date ==
List of shipwrecks: Unknown date in February 1825
Ship	State	Description
Ann	United Kingdom	The sloop struck the Mystone Rock, in the North Sea off the coast of Northumberland and sank between 1 and 8 February. Her crew were rescued. She was on a voyage from Dundee, Forfarshire to Gothenburg, Sweden.
Catharina Margaretha	Hamburg	The ship was lost in the Vlie. She was on a voyage from Hamburg to Amsterdam, North Holland, Netherlands.
Edward Protheroe	United Kingdom	The ship was driven ashore in the Dardanelles. She was on a voyage from Bristol, Gloucestershire to Odesa. Edward Protheroe was reported to have been refloated with assistance from an Austrian man-of-war, but a later report said that she was likely to be wrecked. She was eventually refloated on 29 April and taken in to Constantinople, Ottoman Empire for repairs.
Four Sisters	United Kingdom	The ship was wrecked near Le Tréport, Seine-Inférieure, France in early February with some loss of life. There were thirteen survivors.
Godt Haab	Norway	The ship foundered at "Sondre Sondmoer". She was on a voyage from Bergen to Trieste.
Guldberg	(Denmark) Duchy of Schleswig	The ship was abandoned in the North Sea. She was taken possession of and beached at Sea Palling, Norfolk, United Kingdom on 28 February.
Horace	United States	The ship was abandoned at sea. She was towed in to Saint Barthélemy in a waterlogged condition.
John	United Kingdom	The ship was driven ashore on the Sandwich Flats, Kent in early February. She was on a voyage from South Shields, County Durham to Bordeaux, Gironde, France. She had been refloated by 4 February and taken in to Ramsgate, Ken.
Letitia Tennant	United Kingdom	The ship was driven ashore at Stromness, Orkney Islands. She was on a voyage from Riga, Russia to Belfast, County Antrim. Letitia Tennant was later refloated bit drove ashore again and was severely damaged.
Mary	United Kingdom	The ship was driven ashore and wrecked at Whitstable, Kent in early February. Her crew were rescued.
Morningfield	United Kingdom	The ship ran aground off the Isla de Flores, Brazil in late February and was wrecked. She was on a voyage from Bahia to Montevideo, Uruguay.
Neptune	United Kingdom	The ship was driven ashore on Texel, North Holland. Netherlands and was abandoned.
North America	United States	The ship was wrecked on Bimini, Bahamas in early February. She was on a voyage from Nassau, Bahamas to Key West, Florida.
Strong	United States	The ship was wrecked on Mayaguana in early February. She was on a voyage from Gonaïves, Haiti to Baltimore, Maryland.
Woodstock	United Kingdom	The brig was wrecked on Mayaguana in early February. She was on a voyage from Jamaica to London.
