= Row Island =

Row Island (66°31′S 162°38′E) is a small island, less than 1 nautical mile (1.9 km) in diameter, which lies just off the southeast end of Young Island in the Balleny Islands. John Balleny assigned the name in 1839 to an island which he reported to be 10 nautical miles (18 km) north of Young Island, naming it for James Row(e), one of the merchants who united with Charles Enderby in sending out the expedition. Since the island reported by Balleny could not be found by other explorers in the vicinity, the name was assigned to this island discovered by the British ship Discovery II in 1936.

== See also ==
- List of antarctic and sub-antarctic islands
