= Thomas Sturge (disambiguation) =

Thomas Sturge (1787–1866) was a British oil merchant, shipowner, cement manufacturer, railway company director and philanthropist.

Thomas Sturge may also refer to:

- Thomas Sturge the elder (1749–1825), his father, likewise a British tallow chandler, oil merchant and philanthropist

== See also ==
- Thomas Sturge Moore (1870–1944), English poet, author and artist
