= Balleny =

Balleny may refer to:

- John Balleny (d. 1857), an English captain and explorer of the Antarctic
- Balleny Islands, a series of uninhabited islands in the Antarctic Ocean
- Balleny, County Down, a townland in County Down, Northern Ireland
- Balleny, County Antrim, a townland in County Antrim, Northern Ireland
