= Thomas Sturge =

British shipowner and oil merchant

Thomas Sturge junior
- Born: 13 July 1787; Southwark St John Horsleydown, Bermondsey, London
- Died: 14 April 1866 (aged 78); Northfleet, Kent
- Occupations: Oil merchant, whaler, ship owner, cement manufacturer
- Years active: 1800-1866
- Notable work: philanthropist and social reformer

Thomas Sturge (1787–1866) was a British oil merchant, shipowner, cement manufacturer, railway company director, social reformer and philanthropist.

== Family background and early life ==
Thomas Sturge was born in 1787, one of at least ten children of Thomas Sturge the elder (1749–1825), tallow chandler and oil merchant of Newington Butts, about a mile south of London Bridge. Thomas the younger joined his father's business early in the 19th century, as did at least three of his brothers, Nathan, George and Samuel. Thomas Sturge & Sons, oil merchants and spermaceti processors operated from premises near Elephant and Castle, Newington Butts, until 1840.

He was a first cousin of fellow Quakers, social reformers and philanthropists Joseph, Sophia and Edmund Sturge. Other relatives and social reformers included second cousins Charles Gilpin, Eliza and Sophia Sturge. Hannah, Alfred and Mary Sturge were other relatives.

== Oil merchant and shipowner ==
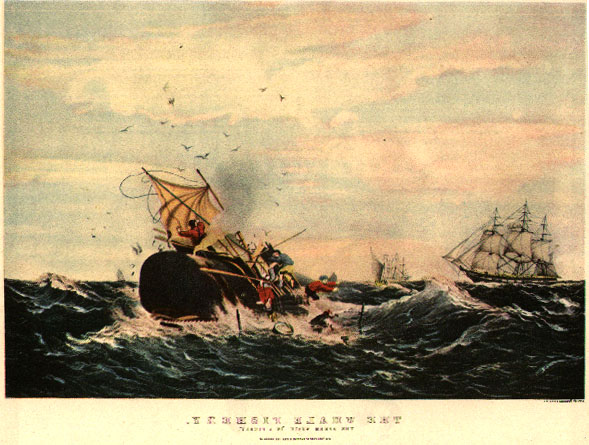
Hunting the sperm whale

Thomas Sturge junior had become the senior partner in the business by 1816, when he began to buy ships and send them to the Southern Whale Fishery to obtain whale oil, seal oil and spermaceti for processing and sale in London. He became the principal owner of at least 23 vessels, most of them South Sea whalers.

His Quaker faith and values were reflected in his business dealings. He tried to choose committed Christians to command his whale ships and in his sailing instructions gave his captains detailed advice on how to treat their crewmen. His vessels each seem to have been supplied with a small library and at least five of his vessels carried a "surgeon" or ship's doctor. One of these was Dr Thomas Beale who later wrote, The Natural History of the Sperm Whale (1839), which he dedicated to his employer. Herman Melville drew on the book for his novel Moby-Dick (1851). The book also inspired three paintings of whaling scenes by J. M. W. Turner, exhibited at the Royal Academy in 1845 and 1846. Turner tried to sell them to his patron, oil merchant, shipowner and art collector Elhanan Bicknell. Bicknell was an associate and friend of Sturge at Newington Butts.

=== Ships ===
Some of the ships owned by Thomas Sturge & Co,

- Cadmus (376 tons)
- Eliza (343 tons)
- Lusitania (243 tons)
- Mediterranean (198 tons)
- Portsea (315 tons)

== Social reformer and philanthropist ==
Sturge was a member of a committee to assist “distressed seaman” by 1818. His firm donated £15 15 shillings in 1821 toward the cost of a suitable vessel to serve as a floating hospital for the “assistance and relief of sick and helpless seamen.” The Seamen's Hospital Society was established that year, with William Wilberforce as one of the many vice presidents; Sturge was one of a couple of dozen men on its management committee, along with Zachary Macaulay and Captain William Young.

He was a member of the Anti-Slavery Society and substantial financial contributor to the cause. Another member of the society was the historian and politician Thomas Babington Macaulay (1800–1859) who became friends with Sturge. There were many Quakers in the abolition movement. Among these was his cousin the prominent anti-slavery abolitionist and philanthropist Joseph Sturge (1793–1859).

Thomas also made regular donations to a range of other charitable causes. He provided transport to missionaries going to the South Seas on his whaling ships. Robert Moffat and his wife left their children in the care of Sturge and his invalid sister when they were in South Africa in the 1860s. Thomas or his father, Thomas senior, was supporting the education of the deaf by May 1821.

== Contributor to Antarctic exploration ==
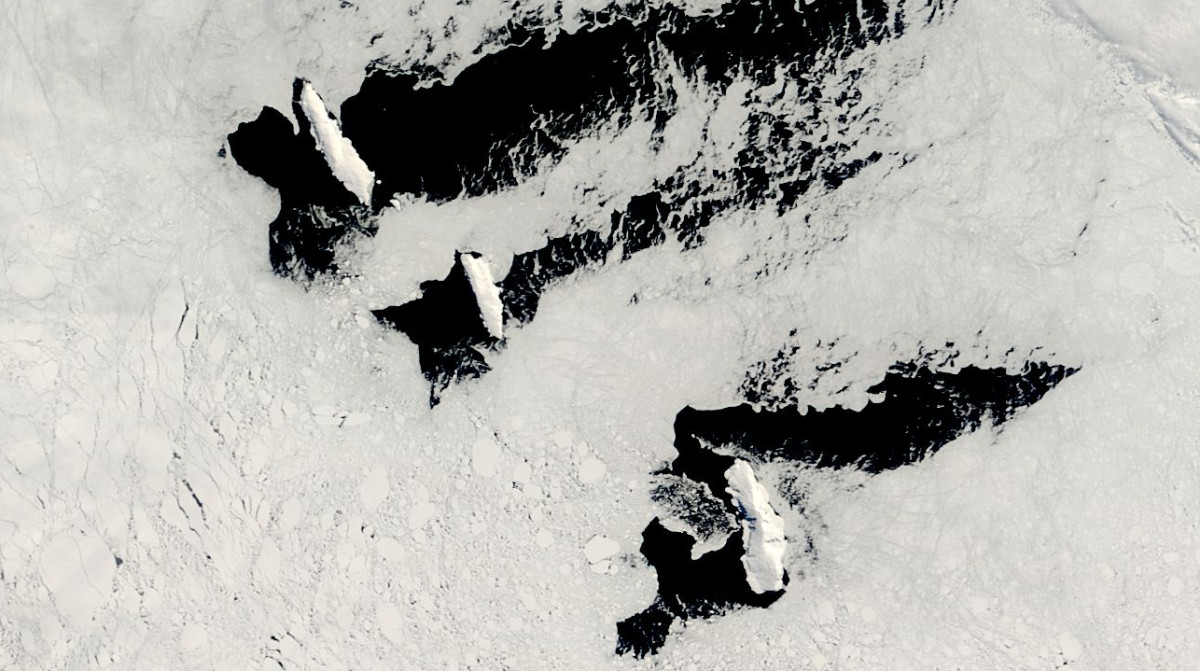
The Balleny Islands from a NASA satellite, December 2007. Sturge Island is the lower of the three main islands.

In 1838 Sturge joined a group of London shipowners to purchase two vessels, the schooner Eliza Scott (154 tons) and the cutter Sabrina (54 tons). These were sent to the Antarctic, under the overall command of Captain John Balleny, to search for undiscovered offshore islands that might host seal colonies that could be harvested. Among the discoveries made was a cluster of five previously unknown islands. They were given the collective name of the Balleny Islands with individual islands named after those who had funded the expedition. Sturge Island is 23 miles long and 7.5 miles wide and permanently covered in a mantle of snow and ice.

== Cement producer ==
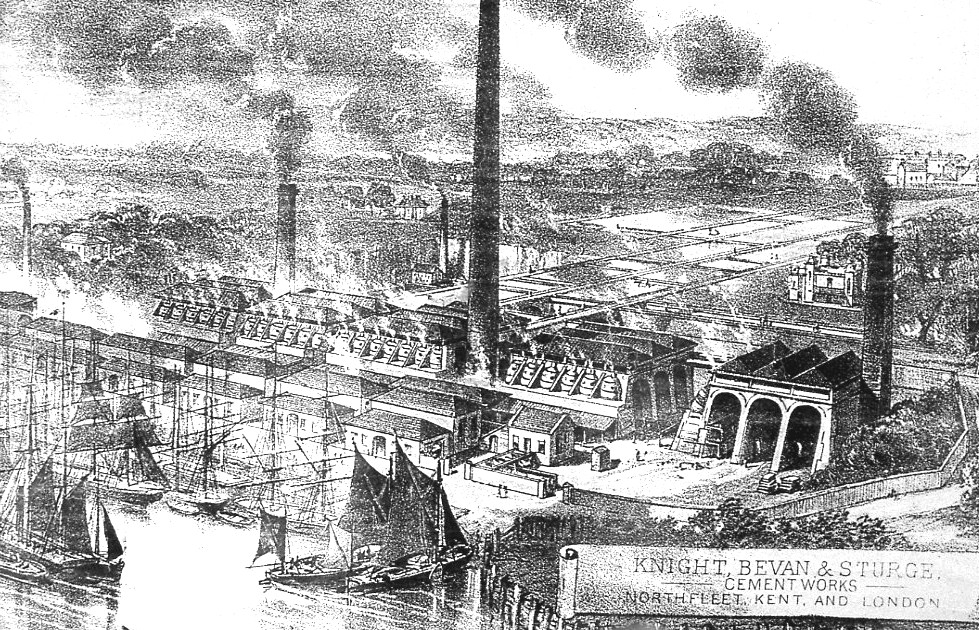
The Knight, Bevan and Sturge Cement works in the second half of the 19th century.

In 1837 and 1838 he purchased two adjacent blocks of land on the Thames near Northfleet at a cost of £9,313. On that 74-acre plot he built a cement works to make Portland cement. Construction of the cement kilns started in 1851 and production began in 1853.

== Railway investments ==
He was interested in the building of new railways and in 1842 he spoke at a public meeting in favour of the construction of the Dean Forest and Gloucester railway line. He became a significant shareholder in the Eastern Union Railway Company and a major shareholder and director of the West Hartlepool Harbour and Railway Company.

== Later life ==
In 1842 he left London and moved downriver to Northfleet, where he had purchased Northfleet House, a mansion under construction, for £3,900. Thomas Sturge the younger died there on 14 April 1866. He never married and most of his estate, valued at about £180,000 (£17,729,000 in 2023 values), was left to his brother and business partner, George.

== Accolades ==
Dr Thomas Beale served on two of Sturge’s whaling vessels and dedicated his book The Natural History of the Sperm Whale (1839) to his employer. In the preface of the book he said,

Having acquired most of the information contained in this Volume during my engagement in your ships, I could not allow the present opportunity to escape without expressing the satisfactionI have felt at witnessing your kindness towards the seamen and others engaged in your service in the South-Sea Fishery. Your care for their comfort and welfare has been constantly shewn in the attention you have paid to the proper fitting out of your ships, so as ro render the voyage - which is necessarily long - less irksome and comfortless to those brave men who go out to capture the “giant of the deep;” while the excellent advice and more solid assistance which you have rendered to their wives and families, when their natural protectors have been “far o’er the sea,” have formed a striking contrast to the conduct of some other ship-owners, possessed of the same means, but with less disposition to solace those who are so often left friendless and unfortunate.

Sturge is commemorated in Sturge Island, the largest in the Balleny chain of Antarctic islands. Twenty-three miles long and up to 7.5 miles wide, it also contains the highest point in the island group, Brown Peak, a stratovolcano more than 2,000 metres high.
