= John William Buckle =

British lawyer and merchant

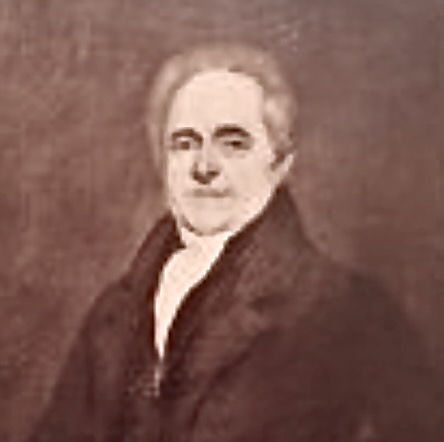
John William Buckle

John William Buckle (1775 – 20 February 1846) was a businessman, merchant and solicitor of 33 Mark Lane, London. He was a partner in the ship-owning merchant firm of Buckle, (sometimes abbreviated to Buckles) Bagster and Buchanan, whose partners were his brother, Thomas Henry Buckle, Henry Bagster and Walter Buchanan. John William Buckle was chairman of the Shipowners’ Society from 1814 to 1824 and of the Committee for the Relief of Distressed Seamen from 1818. He was a member of the short-lived London chamber of commerce in 1823 and 1824, as a wine and brandy merchant, insurance broker and ship manager.

Buckles, Bagster and Buchanan's ships included the Admiral Gambier, Baring, Barossa, Batavia, General Graham and Mangles. They carried convicts, wool and general cargoes and their Australian contacts included, the Colonial Surgeon James Bowman, and the Sydney merchant, Thomas Iceley. Bagster & Co sent four vessels to Australia where they made a dozen whaling voyages from Sydney between 1830 and 1840.

The brothers were the sons of William Buckle, then at Elbow Lane, Ratcliffe, London, but already a wine merchant. The 1784 London Directories showed William Buckle had moved to 64 Queens Street, Cheapside. Henry & Wm Bagster were then sugar refiners in Princes Street, Ratcliffe. They came together as Buckles & Bagster, wine and spirit traders, about 1811. In 1807 John William Buckle gained the Freedom of the City of London as a member of the Company of Skinners. By 1825 he was a director of the Australian Agricultural Company and remained so until his death. He was a director of Indemnity Mutual Marine Insurance (now part of Aviva) and of the Union Bank of Australia from 1837, until his death. In 1825 he became solicitor for the New Zealand Company and remained as a director on its board until 1844.

In 1798 Buckle married Sarah Boyd. They lived at Hither Green. They had at least two children one of whom was named Charlotte. The historian Henry Thomas Buckle (1821-1862) was his nephew.

== Legacy ==
Many places in Wellington and elsewhere were given names associated with the New Zealand Company. One of them is Buckle St, in Mount Cook, Wellington, named after John William Buckle. It now forms part of State Highway 1, between Taranaki Street and Basin Reserve.

In 1839-40, Buckle was one of a consortium of London shipowners who purchased the Eliza Scott and Sabrina and sent them on a voyage of exploration to the Antarctic under the overall command of John Balleny. The expedition discovered a cluster of previously unknown sub-Antarctic islands. Collectively, they were given the name of the Balleny Islands. Each island was named after an individual member of the consortium. One of these is Buckle Island.
