= Cape McNab =

Cape in the Balleny Islands of Antarctica

Cape McNab (66°56′S 163°14′E) is a cape, 350 metres (1,150 ft) high, which forms the south end of Buckle Island in the Balleny Islands of Antarctica. It was named for John McNab, second mate of the schooner Eliza Scott, who made a sketch of the Balleny Islands when they were discovered by John Balleny in 1839.
