= Sabrina Island (Antarctica) =

Islet in the Balleny Islands, Antarctica

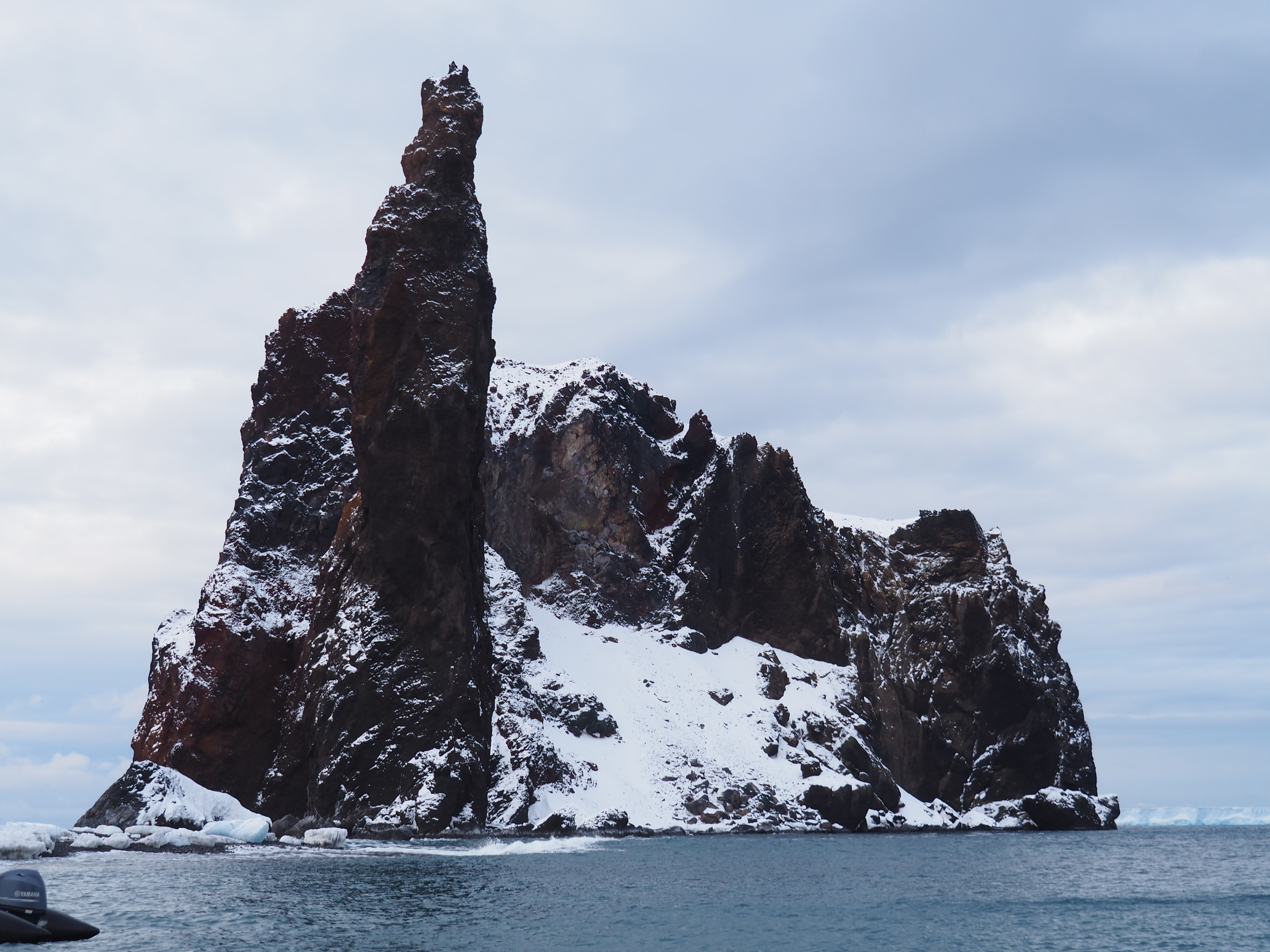
- Sabrina Island monolith

- Location within Antarctica

Geography
- Location: Antarctica
- Coordinates: 66°57′S 163°17′E
- Archipelago: Balleny Islands

Administration
- Administered under the Antarctic Treaty System

Demographics
- Population: Uninhabited

Sabrina Island is the largest of three small islets lying 1.5 km (0.93 mi) south of Buckle Island in the Balleny Islands of Antarctica and are part of New Zealand's Ross Dependency.

== History ==
Sabrina Island was named after Thomas Freeman's cutter when John Balleny's squadron discovered the islands in 1839. A pair of islets called The Monolith are located off of the island's southern tip. The Fifth French Antarctic Expedition led by Frank Liotard landed there on 3 March 1949, but could spend only a few hours ashore.

== Birds ==
The island has outstanding environmental and scientific value as a representative sample of the Balleny Islands – the only oceanic archipelago located within the main Antarctic Coastal Current. It is a breeding site for chinstrap and Adélie penguins as well as Cape petrels. The site is protected under the Antarctic Treaty System as Antarctic Specially Protected Area (ASPA) No.104.

== See also ==
- List of Antarctic and subantarctic islands
