= Alfred Sturge =

Baptist missionary and minister (1816–1901)

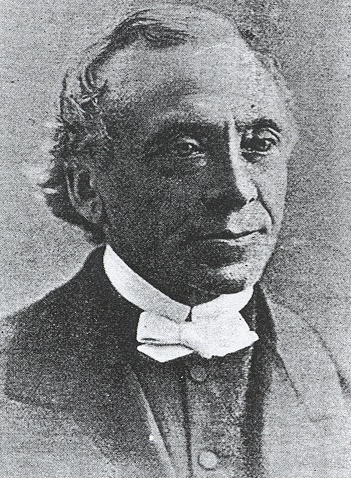
- Born: 5 May 1816; Bishopsgate in London
- Died: 25 January 1901 (aged 84); Dartford, Kent
- Occupations: Baptist missionary & minister

Alfred Sturge (5 May 1816 – 25 January 1901) was a Baptist missionary and minister who served in Devon, India and Kent.

== Ancestry and early life ==
Alfred Sturge was born to Jeanette née Emeric de St. Dalmas (b.1788 d.1874) and Nathan Sturge (b.1789 d.1864) at Bishopsgate in London on 5 May 1816.

He came from a family among the Society of Friends from the days of George Fox. His grandfather, Thomas Sturge, was one of the founders of the British and Foreign Bible Society. George Sturge, one of his uncles, left £500,000 to charity, and another uncle, Thomas Sturge, was an intimate friend of Lord Macaulay. Both were active in the movement for the abolition of slavery, as was his relative Joseph Sturge. On his mother’s side, he was descended from a noble French family, and Count Emerie de St. Dalmas was his maternal grandfather, whose eldest son converted to the Protestant Christian faith, and was consequently prevented by the law of those times from inheriting his father’s title and estates.

He was educated at a Quakers’ School, but found the long and sometimes silent meetings very trying, being only a small boy. The visit of some Quaker Missionaries from America seems to have been the chief factor in him committing his life to Christ. On leaving school, he sat under the ministry of Rev. George Clayton (b.1783 d.1862), and sometimes heard such men as John Leifchild (b.1780 d.1862), an independent minister, and Thomas Binney (b.1798 d.1874), a congregational minister. Subsequently, he moved to Plymouth, where he sat under the ministry of Samuel Nicholson of the George Street Baptist Church (1845–1941), which he joined when he was about twenty-five years old.

In 1841, he married Margaret Tait Stove (b.1819 d.1913), with whom he had twelve children: Esther Eliza (b.1842), Alfred Robert (b.1844 d.1904), Margaret (b.1845 d.1908), Thomas Stove (b.1847 d.1911), Lydia (b.1849 d.1908), Emily Jane (b.1850 d.1924), Samuel George (b.1852), Herbert (b.1854), Maria Frances (b.1856 d.1860), Henry Havelock (b.1858 d.1942), Agnes Ellen (b.1860 d.1951) and Ernest Brainerd (b.1862 d.1882).

== Ministry ==
He began to preach in the villages around Plymouth, and was eventually invited to become pastor of the church at Modbury. After some hesitation he accepted the call, and finally abandoned business for the life of a Christian minister. After several years at Modbury, a Mr. Page of Plymouth asked him to become the pastor of the Baptist Church at Madras in India. He worked there for four years, but found the climate too oppressive for his young growing family.

On returning to England, he resided for some time with his uncle, Thomas Sturge of Northfleet, and became known in the neighboring town of Dartford, where he assisted the pastor of the Congregational Church. After the death of that pastor, he established a Baptist church in that growing town on 7 April 1867 which met in the Working Men’s Institute. The work was so successful, that a more permanent chapel was constructed in Highfield Street and dedicated on 20 April 1868. The work continued to prosper under his charge, until his retirement in 1886.

His disposition, reputation and influence recommended him to many in the community. He was a member, and for a long time chairman, of the School Board, a member of the Board of Guardians, a governor of the Grammar School, and a helper in the local emigration society.

== Retirement ==
In his retirement, he was a valued friend and adviser to all the neighboring churches and pastors, becoming known as the "Bishop of West Kent". He maintained his interest in national and denominational affairs, attending the regular meetings of the London Baptist ministers' fraternal.

The last year of his life was marked by a debilitating weakness, of which he died on 25 January 1901.

He was buried in the East Hill Cemetery at Dartford in Kent, where his tombstone reads:

In loving memory
of
ERNEST BRAINERD STURGE
who fell asleep in Jesus
September 21st 1882
in his 21st year.
'As in Adam all die, even so in Christ
shall all be made alive.' 1.Cor. XV.22.

Also
in loving memory of
the Revd ALFRED STURGE,
for nearly 40 years a faithful minister of
Jesus Christ
in this town,
founder and first pastor of the Baptist church in Highfield Road
Entered into his rest Jan 25th 1901
in his 85th year.
'He was a good man, and full of the Holy
Ghost and of faith: and much people was
added unto the Lord.' Acts.XI.24.

Also in loving memory of
MARGARET TAIT STURGE
wife of the Rev ALFRED STURGE,
a devoted wife & mother and an earnest Christian worker.
Entered into her rest on March 29th 1913,
in the 95th year of her age.
