= Cape Cornish =

Cape in the Balleny Islands, Antarctica

Cape Cornish (66°43′S 163°5′E) is a cape which forms the northern tip of Buckle Island in the Balleny Islands. It was named by personnel on the Discovery II in 1938 for A.W. Cornish, a meteorologist with the Australian Central Bureau who was an observer aboard the Discovery II during 1937–38.
