= Melanella convexa =

- Shell of Melanella convexa (specimen at the Natural History Musum, London)

Scientific classification
- Kingdom: Animalia
- Phylum: Mollusca
- Class: Gastropoda
- Subclass: Caenogastropoda
- Order: Littorinimorpha
- Family: Eulimidae
- Genus: Melanella
- Species: M. convexa

Binomial name
- Melanella convexa (E. A. Smith, 1907)

Synonyms
- Eulima convexa E. A. Smith, 1907

Species of gastropod

Melanella convexa is a species of sea snail, a marine gastropod mollusk in the family Eulimidae. The species is one of many species known to exist within the genus, Melanella.

== Distribution ==
This species is mainly distributed throughout the seas and oceans south of the Antarctic Circle.

== Description ==
The maximum recorded shell length is 5.75 mm; the diameter is 2 mm; the aperture is 1.5 mm long and 1 mm broad.

(Original description) The shell is small and elongate, pellucid white in color, exhibiting the red dried remains of the animal. It is smooth and glossy, and rather blunt at the apex. The eight whorls are a little convex, and increase slowly and regularly. They are narrowly marginate beneath the slightly oblique suture. The aperture is ovate and acuminate above. The peristome is whitish; the outer lip is curved forward in the middle and somewhat sinuated above and at the base. The columellar lip is thickened and reflexed, and it is joined above to the outer lip by a thin callosity.

== Habitat ==
Minimum recorded depth is 250 m. Maximum recorded depth is 765 m.
