= Cape Freeman =

Cape Freeman may refer to:

- Cape Freeman (Balleny Islands)
- Cape Freeman (Graham Land)
