= Cape Smyth =

Cape Smyth (67°37′S 164°40′E) is the southern extremity of Sturge Island in the Balleny Islands. In 1841, Captain James C. Ross, viewing Sturge Island from a considerable distance, thought it a group of three islands. He named the southernmost "Smyth Island" for his friend Captain William Henry Smyth, Royal Navy, President of the Royal Astronomical Society. Ross' error was discovered in 1904 by Captain Robert F. Scott, who applied the name to the southernmost point on Sturge Island.

Other locations named Cape Smyth are: (1) the south-western point of Melville Island, between Warrington Bay and Hardy Bay, in the Canadian Northwest Territories; (2) Inuit ‘Nuwak’ (‘north point’) just west of Point Barrow, Alaska, the most northerly point of U.S. territory. The latter, briefly also called ‘Cape North’, was applied by Captain Frederick Beechey of the Blossom for (later Admiral) William Smyth (c. 1800–1877) who surveyed it with others from that ship in 1826.
