= Sturge Island =

Island of Antarctica

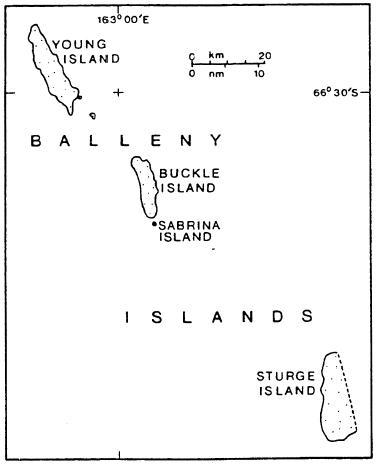
- Sturge Island is the southernmost of the Balleny Islands

- Location within Antarctica

Geography
- Location: Antarctica
- Coordinates: 67°25′S 164°44′E
- Archipelago: Balleny Islands
- Area: 437.2 km^{2} (168.8 sq mi)
- Length: 37 km (23 mi)
- Width: 12 km (7.5 mi)
- Highest elevation: 1,705 m (5594 ft)
- Highest point: Brown Peak

Administration
- Administered under the Antarctic Treaty System

Demographics
- Population: 0

Sturge Island is one of the three main islands in the uninhabited Balleny Islands group located in the Southern Ocean. It lies 25 km (16 mi) southeast of Buckle Island and 95 km (59 mi) north-east of Belousov Point on the Antarctic mainland. The island also forms part of the Ross Dependency, claimed by New Zealand.

== Description ==
The island is roughly a parallelogram in shape, with long east and west coasts and shorter coasts facing north-west and south-east. Of volcanic origin, it is about 12 km (7.5 mi) in width, with a maximum length of 37 km (23 mi), between Cape Freeman in the north and Cape Smyth in the south. It is mostly covered by ice and snow throughout the year. Only sheer cliffs along parts of the west and north coasts are free of snow and ice, thanks to the strong winds. There, on ledges and in crevices, arctic birds nest in large numbers.

The island's highest point is Brown Peak. It reaches 1,524 m (5,000 ft) and is a stratovolcano and also the highest point in the Balleny chain. It has not been climbed.

Sturge Island, and others in the group, are often surrounded by drift ice which makes it hard for small vessels to approach their coasts.

== Discovery and naming ==
The Balleny Islands were discovered by British mariner John Balleny in 1839. Sturge Island was named after Thomas Sturge, an oil merchant and shipowner who was a member of a consortium of London shipowners who sent two vessels on a voyage of exploration to the Antarctic coast in 1839-40 under the overall command of Balleny.

== Later visits and landings ==
The island was sighted by the members of the Terra Nova Expedition early in 1911.

In March 1948, the crew of HMAS Wyatt Earp saw whales along with Japanese and British whaling vessels near the island. They also noted icebergs or drift ice driven ashore by recent gales.

Members of a joint American and New Zealand scientific expedition aboard the United States Naval icebreaker Glacier landed on Sturge Island early in 1965. They were believed to be the first to go ashore.

The Magga Dan, with tourists aboard, came close inshore in February 1968.

Dr David Lewis and other members of a private expedition aboard the Australian yacht Solo landed on the island in January 1978.

== Important Bird Area ==
A 4,655 ha site on the island has been designated an Important Bird Area (IBA) by BirdLife International because it supports extensive breeding colonies of southern fulmars and snow petrels on ice free cliffs along the western and northern coasts.

== See also ==
- Cape Frances
- Composite Antarctic Gazetteer
- Antarctic Treaty
- List of Antarctic and Subantarctic islands
- Thomas Sturge
- List of Antarctic expeditions
