= Cape Ellsworth =

Rock bluff in the Balleny Islands

Cape Ellsworth (66°17′S 162°18′E) is a sheer rock bluff 290 metres (950 ft) high forming the north end of Young Island in the Balleny Islands. It was named by personnel of the Discovery II in 1936 for American explorer Lincoln Ellsworth. The vessel, after picking up Ellsworth at Little America on the Ross Ice Shelf, made a running survey around the northern end of the Balleny Islands on the way back to Australia.
