= Balleny Trough =

The Balleny Trough (66°S 158°E) is an undersea trough named in association with the Balleny Islands. The name was approved by the Advisory Committee for Undersea Features in February 1972.
