= Borradaile Island =

- Location within Antarctica

Geography
- Location: Antarctica
- Coordinates: 66°35′S 162°45′E
- Archipelago: Balleny Islands
- Length: 4 km (2.5 mi)
- Width: 2 km (1.2 mi)

Administration
- Administered under the Antarctic Treaty System

Demographics
- Population: Uninhabited

Borradaile Island (66°35′S 162°45′E) is one of the Balleny Islands. It was the site of the first landing south of the Antarctic Circle, and features the "remarkable pinnacle" called Beale Pinnacle, near Cape Beale on its south-eastern coast, and Cape Scoresby on its north-western coast.

== Exploration ==
Borradaile Island was discovered in February 1839 by John Balleny, who named it for William Borradaile, one of the London merchants who united with Charles Enderby in sending out the expedition. The first landing on the island was by Captain Freeman of the cutter Sabrina on February 12, 1839, who landed briefly on a spit at the islands north-west corner. This was the first time a human set foot south of the Antarctic Circle. The island was not visited again until February 29, 1948, when a party of Australians, including Phillip Law and Stuart Campbell, landed at the same point from HMAS Wyatt Earp.

== Features ==
Borradaile Island is about 4 kilometres (2 nmi) long and 2 kilometres (1 nmi) wide, lying 7 kilometres (4 nmi) southeastward of Young Island. Cape Scoresby (66°34′S 162°45′E) is a high bluff marking the north end of Borradaile Island. It was charted by personnel on the RRS Discovery II who made running surveys of the northern portion of the Balleny Islands in 1936–1938. Cape Scoresby is named after the RSS William Scoresby, a companion research ship of Discovery II in carrying out oceanographic work in Antarctic waters at that time, which is in turn named after the Arctic explorer William Scoresby. Beale Pinnacle (66°36′S 162°45′E) is a boot-shaped rock pinnacle, 60 m high, lying close off Cape Beale, a steep bluff on the south-east side of the island. Both are named after W. Beale, another of the merchants who joined with Charles Enderby in sending out the John Balleny expedition of 1839.

== See also ==
- List of Antarctic and subantarctic islands
