= Admiral Gambier (1807 ship) =

British sailing ship

History

United Kingdom
- Name: Admiral Gambier
- Namesake: Admiral Gambier
- Owner: Buckles and Co.
- Builder: Simon Temple, Temple shipbuilders, Jarrow, South Shields
- Launched: 24 September 1807
- Fate: Wrecked on 20 June 1817

General characteristics
- Tons burthen: 500, or 50075/94 (bm)
- Propulsion: Sail

Admiral Gambier was launched on 24 September 1807 for J. W. Buckle & Company. She made two trips to Australia as a convict transport and one trip from China to Britain for the British East India Company (EIC) before she was wrecked in 1817.

== Career ==
The EIC took Admiral Gambier on as an "extra ship" in 1808.

Under the command of Edward Harrison, she sailed from Portsmouth, England on 2 July 1808, and arrived at Port Jackson on 20 December. She had embarked 200 male convicts, of whom three died on the voyage. Admiral Gambier sailed on 28 March from Port Jackson to England.

On her second voyage, under the command of Edward Sindrey, she sailed from England on 12 May 1811, stopped at Rio de Janeiro, and arrived at Port Jackson on 29 September 1811. She embarked 200 male convicts, of whom three died on the voyage. Admiral Gambier departed for England on 2 December 1811.

Admiral Gambier made one voyage for the EIC. Under Sindrey's command she sailed from Lintin, China, on 5 Jul 1812. She reached Macao on 21 August, Cape of Good Hope on 31 December, St Helena on 27 January 1813, and arrived at Blackwall on 18 May. On her return to Britain Admiral Gambier left the East India company's service.

Admiral Gambier then sailed to Batavia. On 28 December 1815 she was reported to have been well in the Sunda Straits. At the time she was under the command of Captain Duke.

Robert Brooks arrived on 27 March 1816 in Table Bay, South Africa, on the Speke ex Mauritius. He sailed on the Admiral Gambier for England on 1 June 1816.

She sailed for Ceylon in December 1816 under the command of Captain Robert Brasch on what would prove to be an ill-fated voyage. She proved leaky in The Downs and had to return to port. Then on 14 January 1817 while she was in the Bay of Biscay seas struck her, stove in her boats, and swept everything off her decks. Several crew members were injured while clearing the wreckage. Consequently, she had to return to Portsmouth for repairs, reaching there on 18 January.

She left Portsmouth again on 15 March and reached Madeira by the 26th. She dropped off mails, picked up mails for Ceylon, and sailed the same day.

== Fate ==
While still on her way to Ceylon, Admiral Gambier was wrecked on a coral reef in the Mozambique Channel on 20 June 1817. The crew arrived at Johanna after eight days in the boats. Brash reported that the wreck occurred on the reefs of Juan de Nova, which is also known as Sainte-Christophe.

At Johanna, Sultan Allowic treated the 40 passengers and crew with great kindness. When the French vessel Titus arrived on her way to Chandernagow and Bengal, Captain Beck picked up the castaways and took them with him. Titus and her passengers arrived safely in Calcutta around 7 August.
