= Cape Freeman (Balleny Islands) =

Cape on Sturge Island in the Balleny Islands

Cape Freeman (67°20′S 164°35′E) is a cape forming the north end of Sturge Island in the Balleny Islands. It was named for H. Freeman, commander of the cutter Sabrina, which sailed with the schooner Eliza Scott, resulting in the discovery of the Balleny Islands in 1839.
