= Young Island =

Island of the Balleny Islands in Antarctica

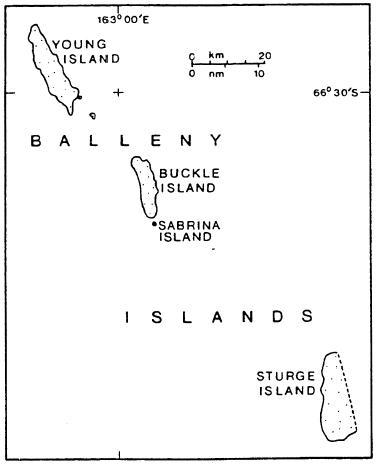
- Young Island is the northernmost of the Balleny Islands

- Location within Antarctica

Geography
- Location: Antarctica (Subantarctic island)
- Coordinates: 66°17′S 162°25′E
- Archipelago: Balleny Islands
- Length: 35 km (21.7 mi)
- Width: 7 km (4.3 mi)
- Highest elevation: 1,190 m (3900 ft)

Administration
- Administered under the Antarctic Treaty System

Demographics
- Population: Uninhabited

Young Island (66°17′S 162°25′E) is the northernmost and westernmost of the three main islands in the uninhabited Balleny Islands group located in the Southern Ocean. It lies 8 kilometres (5.0 mi) northwest of Buckle Island, some 115 kilometres (71 mi) north-northeast of Belousov Point on the Antarctic mainland.

The island is named after George Frederick Young, a Limehouse shipbuilder who was a member of a consortium of London merchants who sent two vessels on a voyage of exploration to the Antarctic coast in 1839–40 under the overall command of John Balleny.

The island is roughly semi-oval in shape, with a long straight east coast and a curved west coast meeting at Cape Scoresby in the south and Cape Ellsworth in the north. The distance between these two capes is 19 nautical miles (22 mi), and at its widest the island is 4 nautical miles (4.6 mi) across. The island is volcanic, with active fumaroles, and a height of 1,340 metres (4,400 feet). It is entirely covered with snow. An explosive VEI-7 eruption occurred from Young Island 1,700,000 years ago.

Several small islets lie in the channel separating Cape Scoresby and Buckle Island, the largest of which is Borradaile Island. Several sea stacks lie off the island's northern tip. These are known as the Seal Rocks.

The island forms part of the Ross Dependency, claimed by New Zealand (see Antarctic territorial claims).

On some days near the Southern Hemisphere summer solstice, Young Island is the first place on land to have a sunrise – that is, the sun sets very briefly, and then rises again earlier in the day than anywhere else on Earth.

== See also ==
- List of Antarctic islands south of 60° S
