= Balleny fracture zone =

Fracture zone in the Southern Ocean

- Fracture zone
- Approximate surface projection on oceans of fracture zones is shown. Key: Fracture zones; Probable extension of fracture zones; Fracture zone of relevance to article; Probable extension relevant to article; Mid-oceanic ridges; Sea; Land; Clicking on the rectangle icon enables full window and mouse-over with text detail.
- Location within Antarctica
- Coordinates: 62°S 156°E
- Water bodies: Southern Ocean
- Etymology: Balleny Islands

The Balleny fracture zone (62°S 156°E) is a fracture zone about 1,700 km (1,100 mi) long in the Southern Ocean that extends south towards the Balleny Islands. Related areas extending to the south past the Balleny Islands and towards northern Victoria Land and the Ross Sea are potentially tectonically active. The name was approved by the Advisory Committee for Undersea Features in December 1971.

== Tectonics ==
The Balleny fracture zone is the first defined fracture zone to the east of the current large plate boundary of the Antarctic and Pacific plates and their Macquarie triple junction with the Australian plate. Its northern end is near the South Tasman Rise and it extends at least to the Balleny islands, with some acaedemic sources mapping it to the Ross Sea. Recent marine survey data raise the possibility that there is an intraplate continuation of the Balleny Fracture Zone as a deformation zone in the offshore area of northern Victoria Land with reactivation of the former plate boundary. There is other evidence that the continuation of the Balleny fracture zone past the Balleny Islands is inactive and does not reach the Ross Sea.

The currently seismically active area between the Bellemy Islands, the Ross Sea and northern Victoria Land is exceptional for an intraplate active area as it was host to the large M_{w} 8.1 1998 Balleny Islands earthquake which has had a long standing debate as to whether it had tectonic or deglaciation as its triggering mechanism. There is a still active Balleny volcanic province associated with the seismically active area.
