= Umitaka Bank =

- Submerged bank Umitaka Bank (Antarctica)
- Interactive map of Umitaka Bank
- Ocean: Southern Ocean

Umitaka Bank (67°25′S 167°0′E) is a submarine bank in the Balleny Islands area. It was named after the research vessel Umitaku-Maru of the Tokyo University of Fisheries, which took soundings in the area (1964–65). Name approved 4/80 (ACUF 201).
