= General Graham (1811 ship) =

British merchant ship 1811–1847

History

United Kingdom
- Name: General Graham
- Namesake: Thomas Graham, 1st Baron Lynedoch
- Owner: J. W. Buckle & Co., or "Middleton"
- Builder: William Gibson & Co., Hull
- Launched: 10 April 1811
- Fate: Last listed in 1844

General characteristics
- Tons burthen: 426, or 429, or 430, or 450 (bm)
- Length: 116 ft 6 in (35.5 m)
- Beam: 29 ft 5 in (9.0 m)
- Complement: 35
- Armament: 14 × 12-pounder carronades

General Graham was launched in 1811 at Hull. She made one voyage for the British East India Company (EIC) as an "extra" ship, i.e., under charter. She carried stores to New South Wales, and returned to England via China. She also made one voyage to Bengal as a licensed ship. Between 1829 and 1847, she made numerous voyages between Scotland and Canada carrying cargoes, but also some immigrants. Currently, she last appears in records in 1847.

== Career ==
At launch, General Graham's master was A. Nieven, but shortly thereafter William Watson replaced him.

=== EIC voyage to Australia and China ===
Captain William Watson received a Letter of Marque on 14 August 1811. He sailed from The Downs on 4 September, bound for New South Wales and China. General Graham left in company with the convict transport Guildford, and reached Rio de Janeiro on 31 October, some five days after Guildford. The two vessels left Rio together. Guildford was again the faster sailer, arriving in Port Jackson on 18 January 1812, whereas General Graham arrived ten days later. Apparently she was carrying stores.

General Graham left Port Jackson on 30 March 1812, supposedly for Bengal. However, she actually sailed to China. On 6 May, Watson sighted a high island at about 7°N that was possibly Pohnpei. Canoes left the island and came towards General Graham. However, they did not make contact with the ship.

Some time thereafter Watson died and William Bendall, the Chief Mate, took command. General Graham arrived at Whampoa on 24 June. Homeward-bound, she reached Malacca on 22 October, the Cape on 34 January 1813, and St Helena on 10 March. She arrived at The Downs on 14 May.

General Graham, Weatherhead, master, was scheduled to sail to Madras and Bengal on 23 July 1818. She sailed on 18 September, as a licensed ship.

Lloyd's Register for 1819 reported that General Graham, Weatherhead, master, had sailed on 31 March 1818 for Bengal and Madras as a licensed ship.

=== Canada ===
Between 1829 and 1847, General Graham made several voyages between Scotland, particularly Alloa, and Canada, sometimes bringing immigrants.

- Captain Craigie sailed from Leith to Miramichi on 3 April 1829. General Graham cleared from Quebec on 12 October, bound for Dundee.
- Captain Craigie sailed from Dundee on 7 August 1830, and arrived at Miramichi on 2 June 1831. In October she sailed to Grangemouth with cargo.
- General Graham sailed from Dundee on 29 July 1831.
- General Graham sailed from Alloa on 27 March 1832, and arrived at Quebec on 17 May 1832, with 12 passengers.
- General Graham arrived at Quebec on 17 May 1834, with 66 passengers from Alloa. In June she sailed to Grangemouth with cargo.
- General Graham sailed from Alloa on 13 April 1835, and arrived at Quebec on 27 May.

General Graham was reported to have been lost on 11 May 1838, near Cape Ray. She was later refloated and taken into Quebec City for repairs.

- Captain Jamieson sailed from Alloa to Miramichi on 4 April 1840.
- In May 1842, General Graham arrived at Quebec with 27 passengers (farmers) from Alloa.
- In 1844, General Graham arrived with three passengers, having sailed on 4 August 1843, from Alloa.
- On 14 April 1847, Captain White arrived at Saint John, New Brunswick.

Lloyd's Register last listed General Graham in 1844, but the last records of voyages occur in 1847.
