= Vaughan Seamount =

Vaughan Seamount Vaughan Bank
- Seamount Vaughan Seamount (Antarctica)
- Interactive map of Vaughan Seamount
- Ocean: Southern Ocean

Vaughan Seamount (67°37′S 163°30′E), formerly Vaughan Bank, is a seamount and submarine bank in the Balleny Islands area. It was named for V. J. Vaughan, commanding officer, USS Glacier used in the U.S./New Zealand Balleny Island Expedition (1965). Name approved 4/80 (ACUF 201).

In June 2017, the New Zealand Geographic Board altered the unofficial name "Vaughan Bank" to "Vaughan Seamount".
