= Portsea (1807 ship) =

United Kingdom
- Name: Portsea
- Namesake: Portsea Island
- Owner: 1809:Smith & Tory; 1815:Nichols; 1825:Shepherd & Co.; 1828:Sturge; 1837:Waddell; 1840:Pacific Steam Navigation Company
- Builder: Michael Smith, Howrah, Calcutta
- Launched: 1807
- Fate: Coal hulk in 1840; final disposition unknown

General characteristics
- Tons burthen: Originally:315, or 320, or 340 (bm); Post-lengthening:425, or 450, or 451 (bm)
- Armament: 12 × 6&4-pounder guns
- Notes: Lengthened 1814

Portsea (or Port Sea) was launched at Calcutta in 1807. She was a country ship; that is, she primarily traded east of the Cape of Good Hope. She participated as a transport in the British invasion of Mauritius. She then carried French prisoners of war to France. She also made one voyage to St Helena from Bengal under charter to the British East India Company (EIC). In 1814 a storm dismasted her and she was lengthened, but it is unclear whether that happened before or after the storm. She made two voyages as a South Seas whaler between 1828 and 1835. In 1838 she made one voyage transporting convicts to New South Wales. She carried coal to Valparaiso in 1840 and there her owners turned her into a coal hulk. Her final fate is not known.

== Career ==
=== Invasion of Mauritius ===
In 1810 Portsea was one of a large number of vessels that the British government chartered as transports to support the invasion.

The British government chartered some nine of these vessels, Portsea among them, as cartels to carry back to France the French troops that they had captured in these campaigns.

Portsea, Hogue, Davidson, & Co., owners, appeared in a list of vessels registered at Calcutta in January 1811.

=== East India Company voyage ===
Portsea left Spithead with the 1st Battalion soldiers of the 60th Regiment of Foot on board that were transferred from Cowes on 30 May 1811 to the Cape of Good Hope and arrived on 18 September 1811. Her master was Captain H Roberts. She departed 15 October. On her way back from delivering the prisoners, Portsea, Burgh, master, was at the Cape of Good Hope on 15 October 1811. She arrived at Kedgeree on 17 January 1812 and Calcutta on 22 January. She was at Kidderpore on 13 February and Fultah on 20 June, before returning to Kedgeree on 24 June. She then arrived at St Helena on 18 October.

=== Capture and recapture ===
On 12 November 1812 Portsea, sailing from Bengal, left St Helena in the company of some whalers, all bound for England. On 31 December the American privateer Thrasher captured her at 42°49′N 27°30′W. (Note: Thrasher, Captain R. Evans, of 14 guns and 110 men, was 19 days out of Gloucester, Massachusetts, and had not yet captured anything. She would capture one more vessel before HMS Magicienne would capture her on 18 January 1813. The British reportedly recaptured all three of Thrasher's prizes.) HMS Helena recaptured Portsea the same day. Portsea arrived in the Thames on 13 January 1813.

=== Country ship ===
On 13 September 1814, Lloyd's List reported that Portsea, from London to Bengal, had put into Ceylon totally dismasted. The Register of Shipping for 1815 shows her master as Burgh, and does not indicate that she had yet been lengthened. The need for repairs may have prompted her lengthening in 1814.

Portsea continued to trade in the East Indies and between India and England. Portsea, Nichols, master, arrived at Port Jackson on 24 August 1817, with merchandise from Calcutta. She left for Peru on 7 September. A letter dated St Jago de Chili 12 December 1817, reported that Portsea, Nichols, master, had arrived at Valparaiso from Bengal via Port Jackson with 1200 bales of piece good, valued at 300,000 dollars.

In 1824 she was sold for a Free Trader.

Year	Master	Owner	Trade	Source
1815	Burgh; J. Nicholls	White & Co.	London–India	Lloyd's Register (LR)
1820	Nicholls	Nicholls & Co.	Liverpool–Bengal	LR
1825	W. Shepheard	Captain & Co.	London–Calcutta	LR; Shepheard died at Calcutta on 18 June 1825.

=== Whaler ===
Portsea made two voyages as a whaler between 1828 and 1835.

First whaling voyage (1828-1831): On 5 March 1828 Captain Bews (or Bowes, or Buze) sailed for the Pacific Ocean. The owner of the vessel was Thomas Sturge. She was reported to have been at Atooi on 18 April 1829, at Oahu on 7 November, on the Japan grounds in April 1830, on 9 September she was in the Eastern Pacific, and at Honolulu on 29 November. She returned to England in 1831 with 322 tons of whale oil.

Second whaling voyage (1828-1831): Captain Bews sailed from England on 28 October 1831, bound for the Galápagos Islands. She was at the Galapagos in April 1832, at Honolulu on 10 November 1833, at Te Puna on 9 February 1835, and the Bay of Islands on 3 March. She returned to England on 20 August with 580 casks and 5 tanks of whale oil.

=== Convict voyage ===
By 1837 Portsea had returned to trading between London and Bombay. Lloyd's Register for 1837 reports that she underwent small repairs in 1837, and gives the name of her master as Woodward and that of her owner as Waddell.

On 8 August 1838, Portsea, Captain Samuel John Lowe, sailed from Plymouth with convicts, bound for New South Wales. She arrived there on 18 December. She had embarked 240 male convicts and she landed 239, one having died on the voyage.

=== Coal hulk ===
Lloyd's Register for 1839 showed Portsea with Woodward, master, J.Somes, owner, and homeport of London.

In 1840 the newly formed Pacific Steam Navigation Company (PSNC) purchased Portsea to carry coal to Valparaiso to establish a refueling depot there for its steam ships. The PSNC purchased the 485 tons of coal that Portsea carried from the Cwm Vale Colliery, Llanely. Captain Samuel Thomas Yetts agreed a freight of 11s per ton, for a total freight bill of £266 15s.

In October 1840 when she was off Cape Horn on her way to Chile a fire developed in her hold. The crew was able to stop the fire by throwing the burning coal overboard and putting water on the remaining coal. She then sailed on to Valparaiso.

Portsea discharged her remaining cargo at Valparaiso. There she provided coal for a British vessel that had just arrived, but the coal proved of poor quality, at least for steam ships. In the case of The Pacific steam Navigation Company vs. Lewis, the PSNC argued that the coal they had received was not suitable for steam engines and the seller had stated.

After the coal was unloaded, it was discovered that several of her hold beams and stanchions were burned through, and the ceiling charred in many places. The PSNC had Portsea's topmasts and yards removed. She then became a coal hulk. Her final fate is currently obscure.

=== Appendix ===
Lloyd's List did not carry her sale to the Pacific Steam Navigation Company or her last voyage.

Year	Master	Owner	Trade	Source & notes
1840	Woodward		London	LR; homeport London
1844			London	LR; homeport London

Portsea was last listed in Lloyd's Register in 1844.
