= The Monolith (Antarctica) =

Antarctican islets

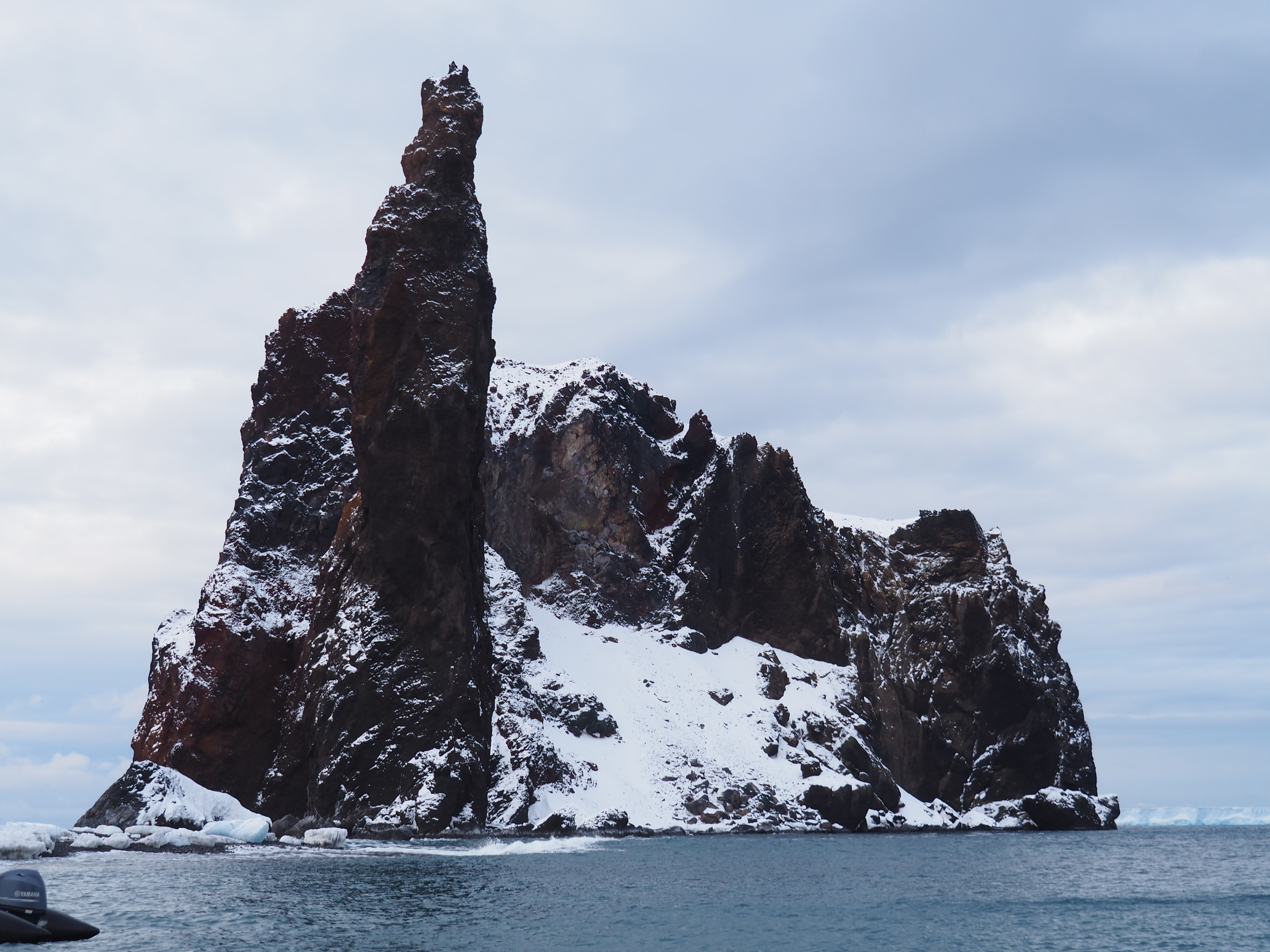

- Location within Antarctica

Geography
- Location: Antarctica
- Coordinates: 66.92°S 163.31°E
- Archipelago: Balleny Islands
- Total islands: 2
- Length: 0.3 km (0.19 mi)
- Width: 0.15 km (0.093 mi)
- Highest elevation: 111 m (364 ft)

Administration
- Administered under the Antarctic Treaty System

Demographics
- Population: Uninhabited

The Monolith is a pair of small islets located off the southern tip of Sabrina Island within the Ross Dependency of Antarctica. The smaller of the two islets rises at a steep incline to 363 feet (111 m) above sea level, and is uninhabited even by penguins which have colonized the other nearby islands.
