= Mediterranean (1810 ship) =

Whaling ship

History

United Kingdom
- Name: Mediterranean
- Namesake: Mediterranean Sea
- Launched: 1810, Lowestoft or [Great] Yarmouth

General characteristics
- Tons burthen: 19820/94, or 202 (bm)
- Length: 84 ft 2 in (25.7 m)
- Beam: 23 ft 8 in (7.2 m)
- Armament: 4 × 4-pounder + 4 × 6-pounder guns

Mediterranean was launched in 1810 in Lowestoft or Great Yarmouth. Initially she sailed to the Mediterranean. Between 1819 and 1823 she made two voyages as a whaler in the British southern whale fishery. She then traded with India, sailing under a licence from the British East India Company (EIC). She may have shifted to India, before returning to British registry in 1835–1837 while performing a third whaling voyage. She then disappeared from online records.

== Career ==
Mediterranean first appeared in Lloyd's Register (LR) in 1810.

Year	Master	Owner	Trade	Source
1810	H.Martin	Captain & Co.	Yarmouth	LR
1812	H.Martin	Captain & Co.	London–Malta	LR
1814	H.Martin	Captain & Co.	London–Mogador	LR
1819	S.Coleman	T.Sturge	London–South Seas	LR

1st whaling voyage (1819–1821): In 1820 Mediterranean became a whaler. Captain Coleman sailed from London, bound for Peru. Mediterranean returned to London on 26 March 1822 with 125 tuns of oil, plus fins.

Year	Master	Owner	Trade	Source & notes
1819	S.Coleman; Ross	T.Sturge	London–South Seas	LR; repairs 1822

2nd whaling voyage (1822–1823): Captain Ross sailed from England on 10 May 1822. On 17 October Mediterranean was at the Cape of Good Hope; on the 24th she sailed for London. She arrived at Gravesend on 18 December 1823 with 30 tanks and 20 casks of whale oil, fins, and 40 cwt of whale bone.

Year	Master	Owner	Trade	Source & notes
1824	Ross; Stewart	T.Sturge	London–South Seas	LR; repairs 1822
1825	J.Stewart	Stewart	London–Ceylon	LR; small repairs 1824

In 1813 the EIC had lost its monopoly on the trade between India and Britain. British ships were then free to sail to India or the Indian Ocean under a licence from the EIC.

Captain Stewart arrived on 29 July 1824 from Madeira and elsewhere. He sailed for Ceylon on 31 July 1824 under a licence from the EIC. He arrived at Madeira on 17 August and sailed for Ceylon on the 24th. Mediterranean arrived at Ceylon on 22 December. On 13 February 1825 she was at Bengal, having come via Columbo.

Although LR continued to carry Mediterranean for some time with data unchanged from 1825, she disappeared from ship arrival and departure (SAD) data. However, in 1828 and 1829, the East-India register and directory did carry a vessel named Mediterranean, of 200 tons. Her master was J.Stephens and her owner Gilmore& Co. The same entries show her being built in "Bayhore", which is possibly Beypore. (Note: Phipps lists four vessels built at Beypore between 1803 and 1825. None is named Mediterranean, and none has a burthen of about 200 tons.)

Mediterranean may have returned to England, though she does not reappear in LR. There is evidence for a third whaling voyage.

3rd whaling voyage (1835–1837): Captain R.Ross sailed in 1835 and returned to England on 19 December 1837 with 20 casks of oil, 30 tuns of oil, and fins. Her owner at the time was Thomas Sturge, Jr. (Note: A listing of Sturge's whalers and their voyages does not include this voyage. It does include the first two.)

== Fate ==
Thereafter Mediterranean disappeared from online records.
