= Cape Frances =

Cape on Sturge Island in the Balleny Islands

Cape Frances (67°30′S 164°45′E) is a cape on the east side of Sturge Island in the Balleny Islands. In 1841, Captain James C. Ross, viewing Sturge Island from a considerable distance, thought it a group of three islands and named the center island Frances. This error was discovered in 1904 by Captain Robert F. Scott, who applied the name to this cape.
