= Brown Peak (Sturge Island) =

Mountain in Ross Dependency, Antarctica

- Location within Antarctica

Highest point
- Elevation: 1,705 m (5,594 ft)
- Prominence: 1,705 m (5,594 ft)
- Listing: Ultra; Ribu
- Coordinates: 67°41′S 164°58′E

Geography
- Location: Sturge Island, Balleny Islands, East Antarctica

Geology
- Mountain type: Stratovolcano
- Last eruption: Unknown

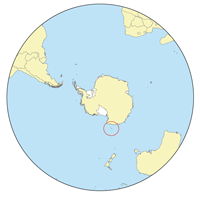
Location of the Balleny Islands

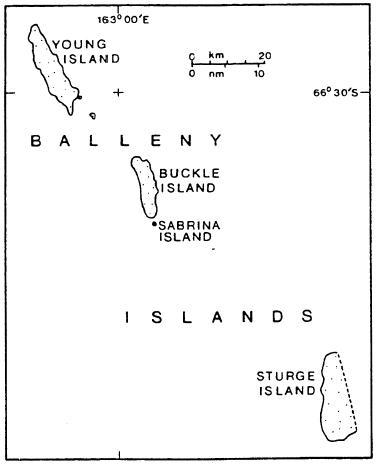
Sturge Island is the southernmost of the Balleny Islands

Brown Peak is a stratovolcano and the highest point of the Balleny Islands. It is situated on the northern part of Sturge Island. Recent research suggests this may be as high as 2170m.

== Discovery and naming ==
John Balleny discovered Brown Peak in February 1839, and named it for William Brown, a Glasgow merchant who provided financial support to the Enderby Brothers' expedition. In 1841, Captain James Clark Ross, who sighted the islands on his own expedition to Antarctica, gave it the name Russell Peak.

== Possible 2001 eruption ==
Satellite imagery suggests that an eruption may have occurred on or about 12 June 2001.

== See also ==
- List of volcanoes in Antarctica

== Bibliography ==
- LeMasurier, W. E.; Thomson, J. W., eds. (1990). Volcanoes of the Antarctic Plate and Southern Oceans. American Geophysical Union. pp. 512 pp. ISBN 0-87590-172-7.
