= Balleny Seamounts =

Seamounts named in association with the Balleny Islands

Balleny Seamounts (61°0′S 161°30′E) are seamounts named in association with the Balleny Islands. The name was approved by the Advisory Committee for Undersea Features in June 1988.

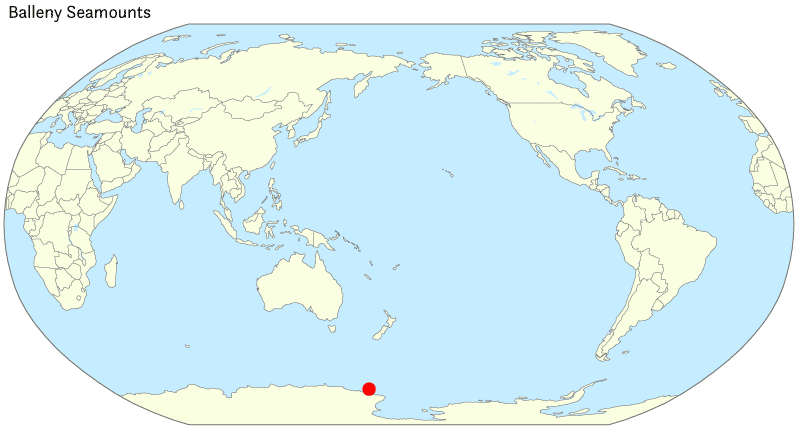
Locator map for Balleny Seamounts
