= Antarctic Circle =

Boundary of the Antarctic

Map of the Antarctic with the Antarctic Circle in blue.

The Antarctic Circle is the most southerly of the five major circles of latitude that mark maps of Earth. The region south of this circle is known as the Antarctic, and the zone immediately to the north is called the Southern Temperate Zone. South of the Antarctic Circle, the Sun is above the horizon for 24 continuous hours at least once per year (and therefore visible at solar midnight) and the centre of the Sun (ignoring refraction) is below the horizon for 24 continuous hours at least once per year (and therefore not visible at solar noon); this is also true within the Arctic Circle, the Antarctic Circle’s counterpart in the Northern Hemisphere.

The position of the Antarctic Circle is not fixed and, not taking account of the nutation, currently runs 66°33′51.1″ south of the Equator. This figure may be slightly inaccurate because it does not allow for the effects of astronomical nutation, which can be up to 10″. Its latitude depends on the Earth's axial tilt, which fluctuates within a margin of more than 2° over a 41,000-year period, due to tidal forces resulting from the orbit of the Moon. Consequently, the Antarctic Circle is currently drifting southwards at a speed of about 14.5 m (48 ft) per year.

== Midnight sun and polar night ==
Relationship of Earth's axial tilt (ε) to the tropical and polar circles

The Antarctic Circle is the northernmost latitude in the Southern Hemisphere at which the centre of the sun can remain continuously above the horizon for twenty-four hours; as a result, at least once each year at any location within the Antarctic Circle the centre of the sun is visible at local midnight, and at least once the centre of the sun is below the horizon at local noon.

Directly on the Antarctic Circle these events occur, in principle, exactly once per year: at the December and June solstices, respectively. However, because of atmospheric refraction and mirages, and because the sun appears as a disk and not a point, part of the midnight sun may be seen on the night of the southern summer solstice up to about 50 minutes (′) (90 km (56 mi)) north of the Antarctic Circle; similarly, on the day of the southern winter solstice, part of the sun may be seen up to about 50′ south of the Antarctic Circle. That is true at sea level; those limits increase with elevation above sea level, although in mountainous regions there is often no direct view of the true horizon. Mirages on the Antarctic continent tend to be even more spectacular than in Arctic regions, creating, for example, a series of apparent sunsets and sunrises while in reality the sun remains below the horizon.

== Human habitation ==
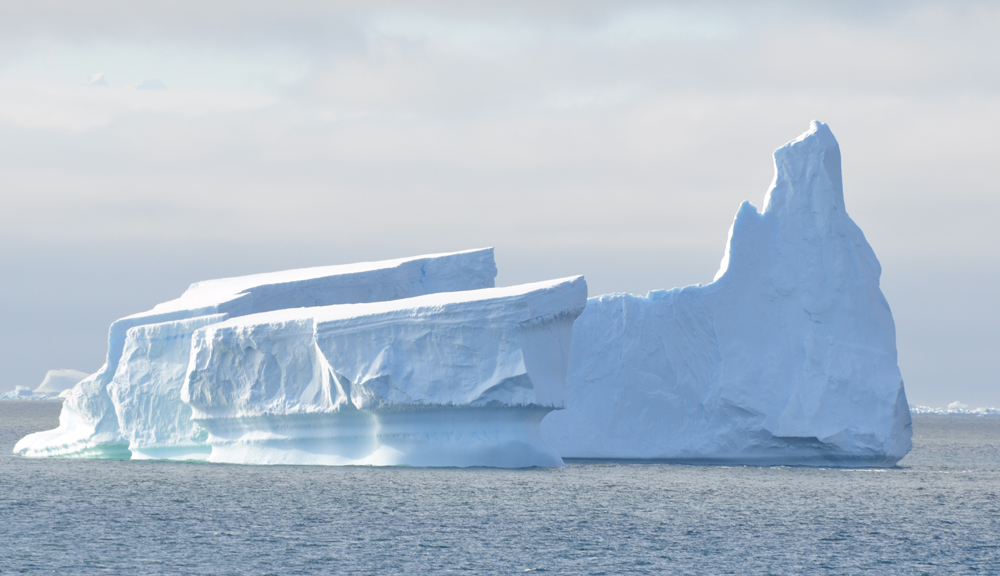
An iceberg near the Antarctic Circle north of Detaille Island

There is no permanent human population south of the Antarctic Circle, but there are several research stations in Antarctica operated by various nations that are inhabited by teams of scientists who rotate on a seasonal basis. In previous centuries some semi-permanent whaling stations were established on the continent, and some whalers would live there for a year or more. At least eleven children have been born in Antarctica, albeit in stations north of the Antarctic Circle.

== Geography ==
The circumference of the Antarctic Circle is roughly 16,000 kilometres (9,900 mi). The area south of the Circle is about 20,000,000 km^{2} (7,700,000 sq mi) and covers roughly 4% of Earth's surface. Most of the continent of Antarctica is within the Antarctic Circle.

=== Sites along the Circle ===
Starting at the prime meridian and heading eastwards, the Antarctic Circle passes through:

Co-ordinates (approximate)	Country, territory or sea	Notes
66°34′S 0°0′E	Southern Ocean	North of Queen Maud Land and Enderby Land
66°34′S 50°32′E	Antarctica – Enderby Land	Territory claimed by Australia
66°34′S 57°19′E	Southern Ocean	North of the Amery Ice Shelf
66°34′S 82°6′E	Antarctica	Territory claimed by Australia
66°34′S 89°14′E	Southern Ocean	
66°34′S 91°29′E	Antarctica	Territory claimed by Australia
66°34′S 92°21′E	Southern Ocean	
66°34′S 93°52′E	Antarctica	Territory claimed by Australia
66°34′S 107°45′E	Southern Ocean	Vincennes Bay
66°34′S 110°12′E	Antarctica – Wilkes Land	Territory claimed by Australia
66°34′S 116°35′E	Southern Ocean	
66°34′S 121°31′E	Antarctica – Wilkes Land	Territory claimed by Australia
66°34′S 127°9′E	Southern Ocean	
66°34′S 129°38′E	Antarctica – Wilkes Land	Territory claimed by Australia
66°34′S 136°0′E	Antarctica – Adélie Land	Territory claimed by France
66°34′S 138°56′E	Southern Ocean	
66°34′S 162°44′E	Balleny Islands – Borradaile Island	Territory claimed by New Zealand
66°34′S 162°45′E	Southern Ocean	Passing just north of Adelaide Island (claimed by Argentina, Chile and United Kingdom)
66°34′S 65°44′W	Antarctica – Antarctic Peninsula, Graham Land and Larsen Ice Shelf	Territory claimed by Argentina, Chile and United Kingdom
66°34′S 60°21′W	Southern Ocean	Passing through the Weddell Sea and into an unnamed part of the ocean

== See also ==
- Antarctic Convergence
- Tropic of Cancer
- Tropic of Capricorn
