= Buckle Island =

Island in Ross Dependency, Antarctica

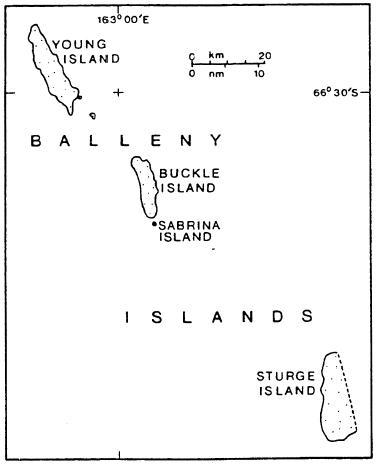
- Buckle Island is in the middle of the Balleny Islands

- Location within Antarctica

Geography
- Coordinates: 66°39′S 163°3′E
- Archipelago: Balleny Islands
- Length: 24 km (14.9 mi)
- Width: 5 km (3.1 mi)
- Highest elevation: 1,239 m (4065 ft)

Administration
- None

Demographics
- Population: Uninhabited

Buckle Island is one of the three main islands in the uninhabited Balleny Islands group located in the Southern Ocean. It lies 25 km (16 mi) north-west of Sturge Island and 8 km (5 mi) south-east of Young Island, some 110 km (68 mi) north-north-east of Belousov Point on the Antarctic mainland.

The island is named after John William Buckle, a merchant and shipowner who was a member of a consortium of London shipowners who sent two vessels on a voyage of exploration to the Antarctic coast in 1839-40 under the overall command of John Balleny.

The island forms part of the Ross Dependency, claimed by New Zealand.

== Description ==
The island is roughly triangular in shape, with long east and west coasts and a short north coast. It is about 3 nmi (6 km; 3 mi) wide in the north, with a maximum length of 13 nmi (24 km; 15 mi). It is of volcanic origin, and is still volcanically active. Smoke was seen issuing from two craters in the middle of the island by vessels nearby in 1839, 1899 and 1904.

The northernmost point is Cape Cornish. Several small islets also lie in the channel separating Cape Cornish and Young Island, the largest of which is Borradaile Island. Several small islets lie off the island's southern extremity, Cape McNab, including Sabrina Islet and the 80-metre (262 ft) tall stack of The Monolith. Both Buckle Island and Sabrina Islet are home to colonies of Adelie and chinstrap penguins.

The island is often surrounded by drift ice which makes it difficult for small vessels to approach the coast.

== Sightings and visits ==
A party from the French Antarctic exploration ship Commandant Charcot landed on the island on 3 March 1949.

== See also ==
- List of Antarctic and subantarctic islands
