= Mangles (1803 ship) =

Calcutta-built UK merchant ship and convict transport 1803–1844

History

United Kingdom
- Name: Mangles
- Owner: John William Buckle/Buckle & Co.
- Builder: Hudson, Bacon, & Co. Calcutta
- Launched: 8 February 1803
- Fate: Last listed in 1844

General characteristics
- Tons burthen: 542, or 543, or 549, or 54951/94, or 561, or 574, or 57453/94, or 594 (bm)
- Length: Overall: 119 ft 10 in (36.5 m); Keel: 94 ft 4 3/4 in (28.8 m)
- Beam: 33 ft 1 in (10.1 m)
- Depth of hold: 17 ft 2 in (5.2 m)
- Complement: 70
- Armament: 1804: 20 × 18-pounder carronades; 1815:18 × 12-pounder guns
- Notes: Teak-built

Mangles was built in Calcutta in 1803 and immediately sailed for England. Including that voyage, she made a total of six voyages as an "extra ship" for the British East India Company (EIC). Between her first and second voyages for the EIC a French privateer captured her. Mangles also made nine voyages transporting convicts to Australia: eight voyages to Port Jackson, one to Hobart Town, and one in which she delivered some convicts to Port Jackson but carried most of her charges to Norfolk Island. She was last listed in 1844.

== Career ==
=== 1st EIC voyage (1803) ===
Captain Hugh Read sailed from Bengal on 26 March 1803. Mangles was at the Cape on 2 June, St Helena on 20 July, and Cork on 19 September. She arrived at the Downs on 2 October. She was admitted to British registry on 16 May 1804. Captain Hugh Read acquired a letter of marque on 19 June 1804. She first appeared in Lloyd's Register (LR) in 1804.

Year	Master	Owner	Trade	Source
1804	H.Reed	Mangles	London–Bengal	LR
1808	H.Reed	Mangles	London–Bengal	LR

=== Capture ===
The privateer Robert Surcouf, in French corvette Revenant, captured Mangles on 20 or 26 September 1807 off Coringa. Maingless (Mangles) was carrying 8,000 sacks of rice from Bengal, but also books, mirrors, and furniture. French records report that she was captured on 18 November, and arrived at Port-Louis on 2 or 16 December.

She returned to British ownership circa 1814. She was not among the vessels the British recaptured in their Invasion of Isle de France in 1810, though several vessels that Surcouf had captured at around the same time as he captured Mangles were.

Year	Master	Owner	Trade	Source
1815	TWCourt	Hussem & Co.	London–Calcutta	LR
1816	TWCourt; B.Bunn	Hussem & Co.	London–Calcutta	LR

=== 2nd EIC voyage (1816–1817) ===
Captain Benjamin Bunn sailed from the Downs on 17 May 1816, bound for Bengal. Mangles was at Madeira on 28 May and the Cape on 15 August; she arrived at Calcutta on 6 November. Homeward bound, she was at Saugor on 30 January 1817 Saugor and Bencoolen on 7 February. She reached St Helena on 6 June and arrived at Long reach on 8 August.

=== 3rd EIC voyage (1818–1819) ===
Captain Bunn sailed from the Downs on 27 March 1818, bound for Bengal. Mangles reached St Helena on 7 June and arrived at Calcutta on 21 November. Homeward bound, she was at Diamond Harbour on 18 February 1819 and Madras on 1 March, and arrived back at the Downs on 16 October.

=== 1st convict voyage (1820) ===
Captain John Cogill sailed from Falmouth on 11 April 1820. Mangles arrived at Port Jackson on 7 August. She had embarked 190 male convicts and she suffered one convict death on the voyage. On 17 September she sailed for Calcutta.

=== 2nd convict voyage (1822) ===
Captain Cogill sailed on 21 June 1822 from Cork. Mangles arrived at Port Jackson on 8 November, having left Rio de Janeiro on 1 September. She had embarked 190 male convicts and she suffered no convict deaths en route. A detachment from The Buffs had provided the guard. On 21 December Mangles sailed for Madras.

=== 3rd convict voyage (1824) ===
Captain Cogill sailed from Portsmouth on 7 July 1824. Mangles left Teneriffe on 28 July, and arrived at Port Jackson on 27 October. She had embarked 190 male convicts and suffered no convict deaths. A detachment of an officer, a surgeon, and 57 men of the 40th Regiment of Foot had provided the guard. Two crew members were lost overboard during the voyage.

Mangles sailed for England on 12 February 1825. She cleared the Sydney Heads but as she was coming abreast of the Macquarie Lighthouse the wind dropped and she became becalmed. A strong current started to drive her towards land, but she dropped her anchors, which held. Boats from HMS Slaney, plus two pilot boats, brought out hawsers and sea anchors. Finally, after seven hours of riding at risk, Mangles was able to continue safely on her journey to England. On the way back into the harbour William Cossar, one of the pilot boats, was wrecked, but the pilot and her six crew members managed to survive, though not without some difficulty. Some merchants in Sydney later gathered 240 Spanish dollars to be distributed among the crewmen of Slaney that had gone to help Mangles. She arrived in England by mid-June.

=== 4th convict voyage (1825–1826) ===
Captain Cogill sailed from Cork on 23 October 1825. Mangles arrived at Port Jackson on 28 February 1826. She had embarked 190 male convicts and had suffered one convict death on her voyage. A detachment of the 57th Regiment of Foot provided the guard.

Captain Coghill decided to stay in Australia so First Mate William Carr assumed command. He sailed Mangles back to England on 14 May with passengers and a cargo of wool, Messrs. Cooper and Levey 9or levy) having chartered her for that purpose. She also carried timber, seal skins, pearl shells, and sundries. On her voyage she touched at Rio de Janeiro for refreshments. She arrived back in London on 3 October.

=== 4th EIC voyage (1826–1827) ===
Captain William Carr sailed on 21 December 1826, bound for Bombay. She arrived at Bombay on 27 May 1827.

=== 5th convict voyage (1828) ===
Captain Carr sailed from Dublin on 23 February 1828, bound for Port Jackson. Mangles arrived on 2 June. She had embarked 200 convicts and suffered three convict deaths on her voyage. At the time the voyage of 94 days was the fastest convict voyage from England. A detachment of two officers and 45 men of the 57th Regiment of Foot provided the guard. On 30 June Mangles sailed for Batavia. From there she sailed to Calcutta before returning to England.

=== 5th EIC voyage (1829–1830) ===
Captain Carr sailed from the Downs on 6 June 1829, bound for China and then Halifax, Nova Scotia. On 12 November Mangles was in the Cap Sing Moon passage. (Note: The Cap Sing-Moon passage is the waterway between the northern tip of Lantoa and mainland China. Mah Wan Island splits the Passage into two channels, the narrower channel between Lanoa/Lantau and Ma Wan, and the wider between Ma Wan and the mainland.) On 9 February 1830 she arrived at Whampoa Anchorage. Homeward bound, she crossed the Second Bar on 13 March, reached St Helena on 29 May, and arrived at Halifax on 13 July. She arrived back in England on 16 September.

=== 6th EIC voyage (1831–1832) ===
Captain Carr sailed from the Downs on 4 June 1831, bound for China and then Halifax. Mangles arrived at Whampoa on 8 October. Homeward bound, she crossed the Second Bar on 5 December, reached St Helena on 9 February 1832, and arrived at Halifax on 12 April. She arrived back in England on 15 August.

=== 6th convict voyage (1832–1833) ===
Captain Carr sailed from London on 14 December 1832, bound for Port Jackson. Mangles arrived on 29 April 1833. She had embarked 236 male convicts and suffered one convict death on the voyage. The 21st Regiment of Foot provided the enlisted men of the guard. She sailed on 3 June for Singapore with muskets, gunpowder, and stores.

Year	Master	Owner	Trade	Source & notes
1834	Wm.Carr	London–Hobart town	Buckles & Co.	LR; small repairs 1835

=== 7th convict voyage (1835) ===
Captain Carr sailed from Portsmouth on 21 April 1835, bound for Hobart Town. Mangles arrived 2 August. She had embarked 310 convict and she suffered no convict deaths on her voyage. The 17th Regiment of Foot provided the guard; one soldier died on the voyage. Mangles was at Murray Island in the Torres Strait Island on 18 September. When he reached Singapore, Carr notified the authorities that he believed that there were survivors on Murray's Island from Charles Eaton and that the locals would not let them leave. He had also see one European who apparently was content not to leave. On 18 May 1836 Mangles sailed form Calcutta for London.

=== 8th convict voyage (1837) ===
Captain Carr sailed from London on 23 March 1837, bound for Port Jackson. Mangles arrived on 10 July. She had embarked 310 male convicts and suffered two crew deaths on the voyage. Three officers and 32 men of the 80th Regiment of Foot provided the guard. She sailed for Canton on 13 August, in ballast.

=== 9th convict voyage (1839–1840) ===
Captain Carr sailed from Portsmouth on 28 November 1839, bound for Port Jackson. Mangles sailed via Teneriffe and the Cape and arrived at Port Jackson on 27 April 1840. She had embarked 290 male convicts and she suffered one convict death on the voyage. Two officers and 29 rank-and-file of the 50th Regiment of Foot provided the guard. Mangles disembarked 53 convicts at Port Jackson. Then on 8 May she sailed to Norfolk Island, where she arrived on 18 May. There she landed 236 convicts.

Year	Master	Owner	Trade	Source & notes
1841	W.Carr; Driscoll	London	W.Carr	LR; small repairs 1835 & damages repaired 1836
1843	Driscoll	London	T.Ward	LR; small repairs 1835 & damages repaired 1836

== Fate ==
Mangles was last listed in 1844.
