= William Cossar =

Welsh Naval Vessel

Coordinates: 33.8369°S 151.2706°E

History

New South Wales
- Name: William Cossar
- Namesake: William Cossar, Shipbuilder
- Builder: William Cossar, HM Dockyard, Sydney
- Fate: Wrecked in 1825

General characteristics
- Class & type: Schooner
- Tons burthen: 20 (bm)

William Cossar was a small 20 ton wooden New South Wales Colonial Government schooner that was wrecked in 1825.

The ship was named after the Government master boat builder, William Cossar.

On 7 July 1817 a party of convicts stole William Cossar from Newcastle, New South Wales. In late November the ship was reported to have been driven ashore at Port Stephens. Nancy was sent to investigate and on 10 December 1818 William Cossar was found to be lying on a beach at the high-tide mark. The rigging, sails, gaffs, booms, bowsprit and rudder were missing, as was most of the copper sheathing. There were no signs of the convicts. They may have been killed by Aboriginal people although it was reported that one survivor returned to Sydney on 1 May 1819. The ship was repaired and refloated after much effort.

On 11 March 1824, the ship capsized near Fort Macquarie, Sydney Harbour, in a squall, and three men drowned. The ship was righted and repaired but then on 14 February 1825, while under the command of Captain Wise, she was wrecked on the Sow and Pigs Reef in Sydney Harbour, after towing the ship Mangles out to sea.
