= Thomas Sturge the elder =

London tallow chandler, oil merchant, spermaceti processor and philanthropist

Thomas Sturge senior
- Born: 1749; Olveston, Gloucestershire, England
- Died: August 11, 1825 (aged 75–76); Bath, England
- Occupations: tallow chandler and oil merchant
- Notable work: philanthropist, education reformer
- Spouse: Lydia Moxhan (m. 1790)
- Children: At least 10

Thomas Sturge the Elder (1749 – 11 August 1825) was a London tallow chandler, oil merchant, spermaceti processor and philanthropist. He was a Quaker.

== Business career ==
Sturge was born into a farming family at Olveston, Gloucestershire, in 1749. He was an apprentice at Poole, Dorset, by 1766, and afterwards began work as an oil-leather dresser. He seems to have been in London by 1782, where he worked as a tallow chandler and oil merchant. By 1785 he was at Walworth and then at Newington Butts, Elephant and Castle. He is also named as a spermaceti refiner there by 1791.

== Reformer and philanthropist ==
Sturge was a devout Quaker and an elder of the society in London. Like many other Quakers, he took an interest in social reform and gave financial support to worthy causes. He took a particular interest in education and was an early supporter of Joseph Lancaster (1788–1838), a fellow Quaker, neighbour and friend at Newington Butts. Lancaster developed a system of cheap mass education for the poor known as the Lancastrian Method, in which more advanced students were employed to instruct the younger children under the direction of an adult teacher. This system of peer tutoring came to be used widely in Europe and America in the first half of the 19th century to provide basic education for many poor children who might otherwise have received no instruction at all. Sturge was a member of the Committee of the Royal British or Lancastrian System of Education by 1808, which was renamed the British and Foreign School Society in 1819.

Sturge gave his support to other forms of education. In 1804 he made a donation to the School for the Indigent Poor, St George's Fields, London. He, or his son Thomas Junior, was also supporting the education of the deaf by May 1821.

Thomas Sturge was a founding member of the Peace Society in 1816.

== Family life ==
Sturge married Lydia Moxhan in 1790. The couple had at least ten children. Early in the 19th century, he took into the business at least four of his sons, including his namesake Thomas Sturge the younger. The firm then became Thomas Sturge & Sons.

Thomas Sturge the elder died at Bath on 11 August 1825.
