= Balleny Islands =

Group of volcanic islands

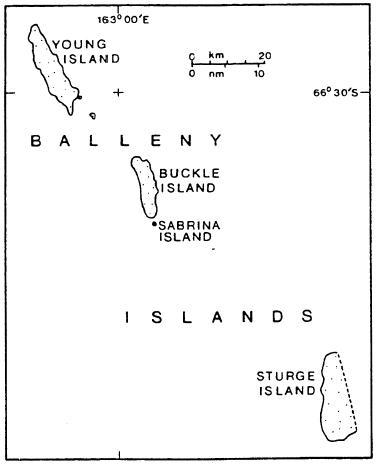
- Map of the Balleny Islands

- Location within Antarctica

Geography
- Location: Antarctica
- Coordinates: 66°55′S 163°45′E
- Archipelago: Balleny Islands
- Area: 800 km^{2} (310 sq mi)
- Highest elevation: 1,705 m (5594 ft)
- Highest point: Brown Peak

Administration
- New Zealand

Demographics
- Population: Uninhabited

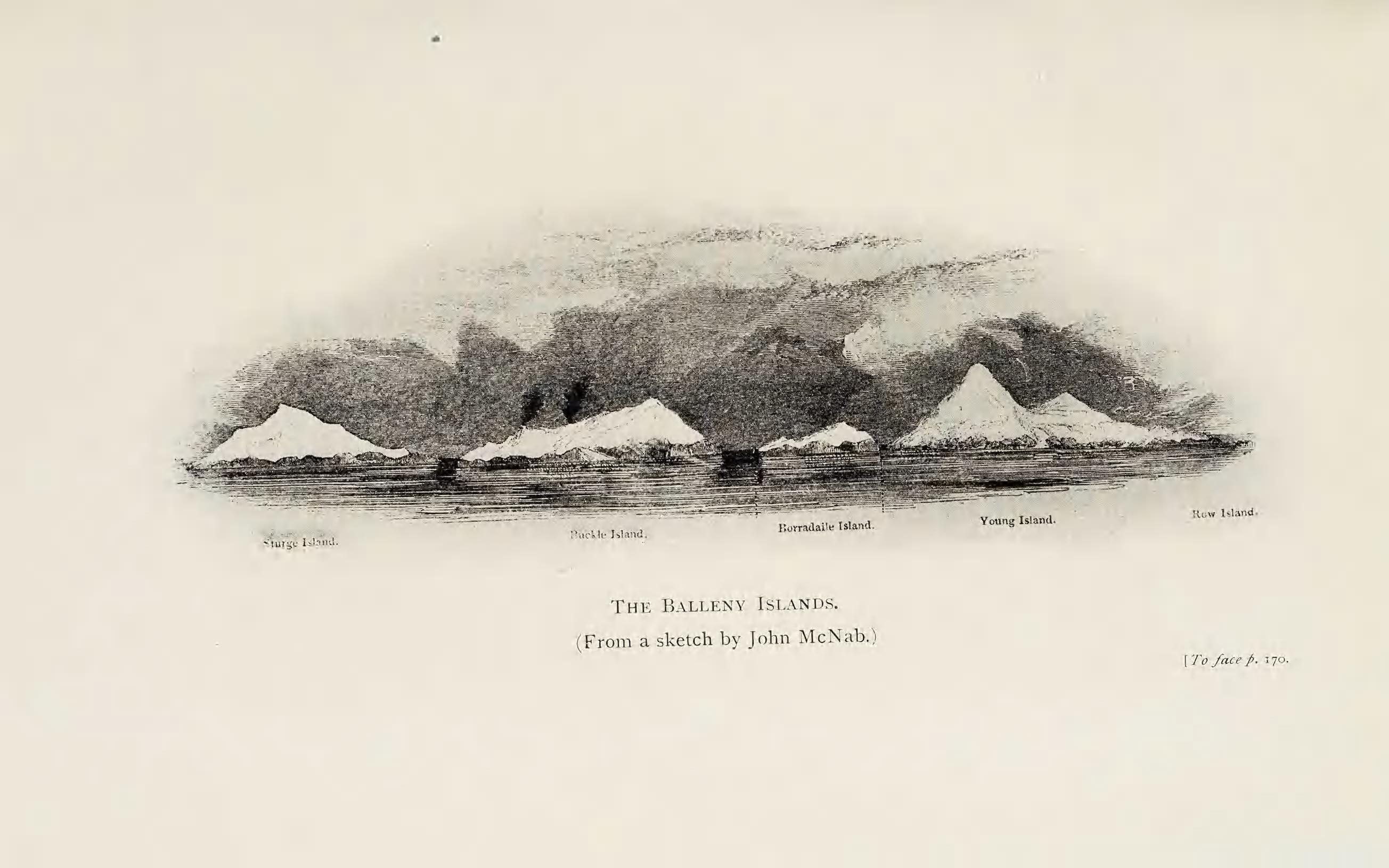
The Balleny Islands from a sketch by John MacNab, a crew member of the ship Eliza Scott that visited the Balleny Islands in 1839. In a description of this sketch in his 1905 history of Antarctic exploration, H.R. Mill drew attention to "smoke rising from an active volcano on Buckle Island". This sketch supports findings suggesting Buckle Island as the source of volcanic cryptotephra layers deposited in Marie Byrd Land in 1839.

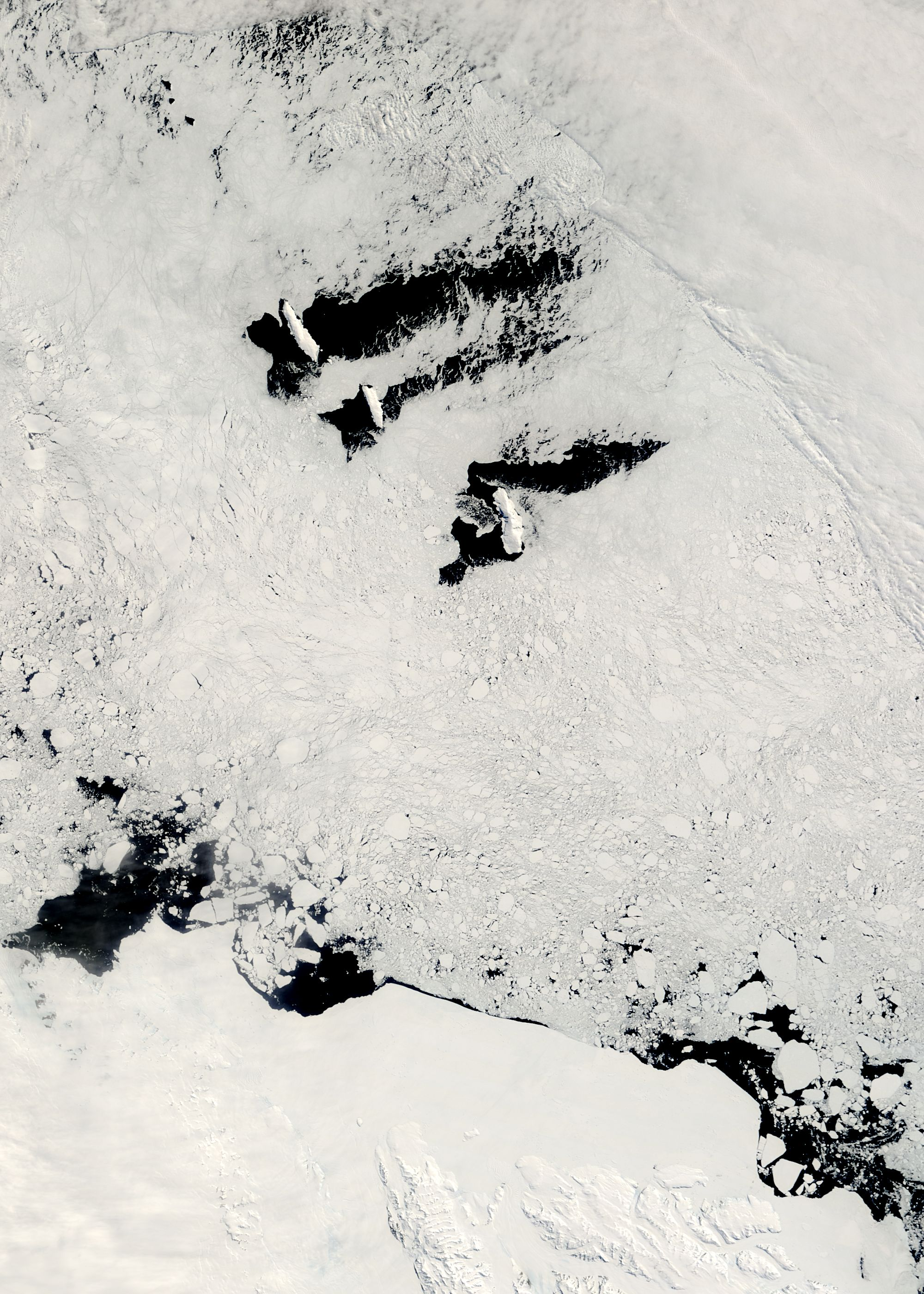
The Balleny Islands (top) and Antarctic coast (bottom) from space, December 2007. Dark patches are ice-free sea surface.

The Balleny Islands (66°55′S 163°45′E) are a series of uninhabited islands in the Southern Ocean extending from 66°15' to 67°35'S and 162°30' to 165°00'E. The group extends for about 160 km (99 mi) in a northwest–southeast direction. The islands are heavily glaciated and of volcanic origin. Glaciers project from their slopes into the sea. The islands were formed by the so-called Balleny hotspot.

The group includes three main islands: Young, Buckle and Sturge, which lie in a line from northwest to southeast, and several smaller islets and rocks:

- northeast of Young Island: Seal Rocks, Pillar
- southeast of Young Island: Row Island, Borradaile Island (with Swan Base shelter hut)
- south of Buckle Island: Scott Cone, Chinstrap Islet, Sabrina Islet (with Sabrina Refuge shelter hut), and the Monolith

The islands are claimed by New Zealand as part of the Ross Dependency (see Territorial claims in Antarctica).

== Islands and rocks from north to south ==
Island/Rock	Area		Highest peak	
Island/Rock	km^{2}	mi^{2}	m	ft
Young Island and satellite islets
Seal Rocks	0.0	0	15	49
Pillar	0.0	0	51	167
Young Island	255.4	98.6	1,340	4,400 (Freeman Peak)
Row Island	1.7	0.66	183	600
Borradaile Island	3.5	1.4	381	1,250
Beale Pinnacle	0.0	0	61	200
Buckle Island and satellite islets
Buckle Island	123.6	47.7	1,238	4,062
Scott Cone	0.0	0	31	102
Eliza Cone	0.0	0	67	220
Chinstrap Islet	0.0	0		
Sabrina Island	0.2	0.077	90	300
The Monolith	0.1	0.039	79	259
Sturge Island (no satellite islets)
Sturge Island	437.4	168.9	1,705 or 1524	5,594 or 5,000 (Brown Peak)

The islands' area totals 400 km^{2} (154 mi^{2}) and the highest point has been measured as 1,705 m (5,594 ft) or approximately 1,500 m (5,000 ft) (the unclimbed Brown Peak on Sturge Island).

The Antarctic Circle is close to Borradaile Island, in the eight-kilometre channel between Young and Buckle Islands. Buckle Island and the nearby Sabrina Island is home to several colonies of Adelie and chinstrap penguins.

== Recorded human visits to the islands ==
The English sealing captains John Balleny and Thomas Freeman first sighted the group in 1839. Balleny named the island group after himself and the individual islands after the London merchants whose financial backing had made the expedition possible. Freeman was the first person known to land on any of the islands on 9 February 1839, and this was the first recorded human landfall south of the Antarctic Circle.

Sealers sighted the islands in 1853 but did not land.

In 1948, the islands were surveyed by the Australian National Antarctic Research Expeditions aboard HMAS Wyatt Earp. A small landing party led by Stuart Campbell made landfall in a whaleboat on 29 February 1948, apparently the first people to set foot on the islands since their discovery in 1839.

In February 2015 the islands were visited for three days by the New Zealand-Australia Antarctic Ecosystems Voyage under the auspices of the New Zealand National Institute of Water and Atmospheric Research aboard the vessel RV Tangaroa, with the objective of studying marine life ecosystems of the islands, especially with reference to the humpback whale. This work followed up work done on a previous visit in 2010.

On 3 February 2017, personnel from the Swiss Polar Institute's Antarctic Circumnavigation Expedition visited the islands and carried out considerable photographic and video survey work which was intended to contribute to the first accurate mapping of the main islands. Most of the work was done by helicopter, although at least one landfall was also made on the islands by this expedition, using Zodiac inflatable boats.

== Geology ==
In the archipelago, the Buckle, Sturge and Young Islands are examples of stratovolcanoes. Strong earthquakes very close to the islands are rare, but tremors of moderate strength do occur over the Pacific-Antarctic Ridge, Macquarie triple junction and Pacific Rim between the Balleny Islands and Macquarie Island. Other earthquakes occur near the Southeast Indian Ridge and Balleny fracture zone, including a magnitude 8.1 earthquake in 1998 that struck just over 700 km (430 mi) west-northwest of the islands which changed the pattern of seismicity in a wide area around the islands.

It is possible that these islands are still volcanically active. The Brown Peak volcano may have had an eruption in 2001, based on satellite observation.

== Weather ==
The islands experience strong weather with powerful winds and regular gales for much of the year. Cloud cover is present most of the time with an average of only 15 days of blue sky a year.

== Submerged features ==
Several underwater features lie close to the Balleny Islands:

- Balleny Seamounts
- Balleny Trough
- Umitaka Bank
- Vaughan Seamount

== See also ==
- Cape Frances
- Composite Gazetteer of Antarctica
- List of Antarctic islands south of 60° S
- Lists of islands
- Scientific Committee on Antarctic Research
- Territorial claims in Antarctica
- Uninhabited island
- List of Antarctic expeditions
