= John Balleny =

British mariner and explorer

John Balleny (c. 1770 – 1857) was the English captain of the sealing schooner Eliza Scott, who led an exploration cruise for the English whaling firm Samuel Enderby & Sons to the Antarctic in 1838–1839. During the expedition of 1838–1839, Balleny, sailing in company with Thomas Freeman and HMS Sabrina, sailed into the Southern Ocean along a corridor of longitude centering on the line of 175°E., south of New Zealand.

== Biography ==
Balleny was born approximately 1770, and by 1798 was living in St George in the East, then the shipping quarter of London, and was part owner of a 569 ton ship, Blenheim. He was recorded as ship's master for a few trading ships up until 1824, including the trading ship Lord Cathcart and the 269-ton brig Peace. In 1824, he owned part of a whaling barque, Caledonia, but was not longer registered as the master of any ship for the following year, possibly indicating his retirement.

== Voyage of Eliza Scott ==
Samuel Enderby & Sons had sent two unsuccessful expeditions towards Antarctica in the early 1830s, and had decided to send a third - the 156–ton (bm), schooner Eliza Scott and the 54-ton cutter HMS Sabrina (18216). (Note: Lloyd's Register (LR) reported that Eliza Scott, of 135 tons (bm), had been launched at London in 1830.) (Note: The British Southern Whale fishery Database reports that Sabrina had been launched at Southampton in 1821. It gives her burthen as 47 tons (new measurement), or 82 tons (old measurement).) Although the ships set off from London on 12 July 1838 with Thomas Freeman in command of Eliza Scott, by the time they had reached Deal, Kent two days later, Balleny was in command and Freeman was master of Sabrina, evidently brought out of retirement for the expedition.

Eliza Scott had not been built for such an arduous journey, making the trip quite a difficult one for Balleny and his crew. In addition, Balleny had intended to hold religious services on a Sunday, which had endeared him to the Enderbys, but the crew refused to come on deck to the service early in the journey and the plan was dropped. The ships arrived at Chalky Island near New Zealand on 3 December 1838, where they remained for a month, hunting seals and replenishing supplies.

From New Zealand, the expedition reached Campbell Island. There they found a four-man sealing gang that New Zealander had left behind four years earlier. Balleny enlisted the four men and purchased their 165 seal skins.

The Balleny squadron logged a partial break in the pack ice surrounding the southern continent, discovered the Balleny Islands in 1839, and caught a brief sight of Antarctica itself at 64°58′S 121°08′E. This patch of icy land is today called the Sabrina Coast.

On the return journey, Sabrina was lost on 24 March 1839.

Eliza Scott arrived back in England on 19 September 1839. The voyage was not profitable as the 178 seal skins that Balleny returned with did not cover the cost of the expedition.

She left on another whaling voyage on 8 July 1840. She then sailed between London and Saint Helena.
