= HMS Confiance (1814) =

Frigate of the Royal Navy

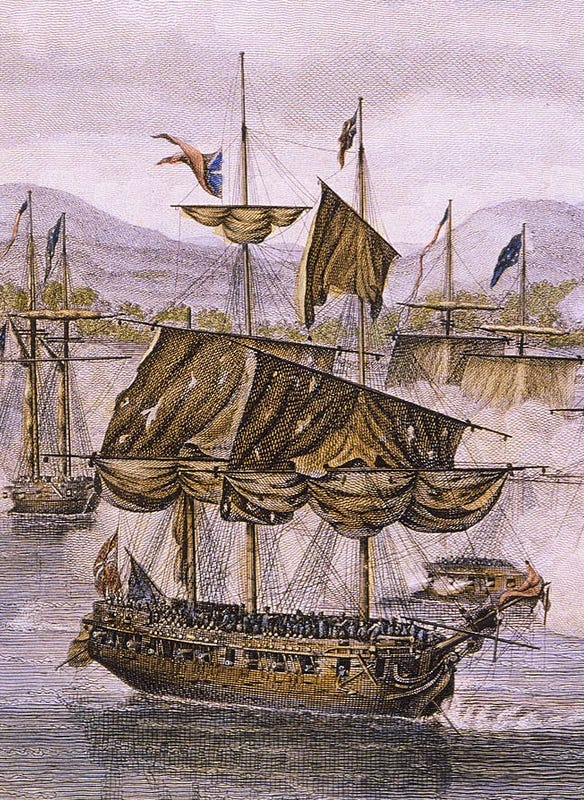
- Confiance

History

United Kingdom
- Name: HMS Confiance
- Builder: Ile aux Noix Naval Shipyards, Quebec, Canada
- Launched: 25 August 1814
- Fate: Captured at the Battle of Plattsburgh, 11 September 1814

United States
- Name: USS Confiance
- Acquired: 11 September 1814
- Fate: Abandoned and sunk, 1820

General characteristics
- Type: Fifth-rate frigate
- Tons burthen: 831 bm
- Length: 147 ft 5 in (44.93 m) (Note: All dimensions are from Silverstone.)
- Beam: 37 ft 2 in (11.33 m)
- Depth of hold: 7 ft (2.1 m)
- Propulsion: Sail
- Armament: British service: 30 × 24-pounder guns; 6 × 32-pounder carronades; 1 × 24-pounder gun (on pivot mount); As captured: 27 × 24-pounder guns; 2 × 18-pounder guns; 4 × 32-pounder carronades; 6 × 24-pounder carronades

HMS Confiance was a 36-gun fifth-rate frigate that served in the Royal Navy on Lake Champlain during the War of 1812. Confiance served as Captain George Downie's flagship at the Battle of Plattsburgh, on 11 September 1814. Surrendered to the American Squadron following a nearly 2½ hour battle, she was eventually taken to Whitehall, New York where she was taken into the U.S. Navy and placed in ordinary. The vessel was formally abandoned by the Navy in 1820 and after being partially salvaged, was allowed to sink at her moorings. As a danger to navigation, the sunken hulk was destroyed with dynamite charges during dredging operations on the channel in 1873.

== Background ==
The frigate was constructed at the Ile aux Noix Naval Shipyards and launched on 25 August 1814. To this day Confiance remains the largest warship ever to sail on Lake Champlain. The British built Confiance in answer to the American commander Thomas Macdonough's ambitious shipbuilding program, itself designed to thwart British advances into Vermont and New York State via the lake. The formidable vessel was described as having "the gun-deck of a heavy frigate, with thirty long twenty-fours upon it. She also had a spacious top gallant forecastle, and a poop that came no further forward than the mizzen mast. On the first were a long twenty-four on a circle, and four heavy carronades; two heavy carronades were mounted on the poop."

Captain George Downie was appointed to command soon after the vessel was launched, replacing Captain Peter Fisher, who in turn had superseded Commander Daniel Pring. As a fifth-rate ship, Confiance required a post rank captain in command, and only the distant Admiralty could promote Pring to Post Captain. Like Macdonough, Downie had difficulty obtaining men and materials from Commodore James Lucas Yeo on Lake Ontario, and Macdonough had intercepted several spars and other materials sold to Britain by unpatriotic Vermonters. Downie could promise to complete Confiance only on 15 September; and even then, her crew would not have been exercised.

Sir George Prevost, Governor in Chief of British North America and overall commander of the invasion forces, was anxious to begin his campaign as early as possible, to avoid the bad weather of late autumn and winter, and continually pressed Downie to prepare Confiance for battle more quickly. Although the British sloops and gunboats were already on the Lake, it took two days to tow the frigate Confiance up the Richelieu River from Ile aux Noix, against both wind and current. Downie finally joined the squadron with his flagship on 9 September.

== The Battle of Plattsburgh ==
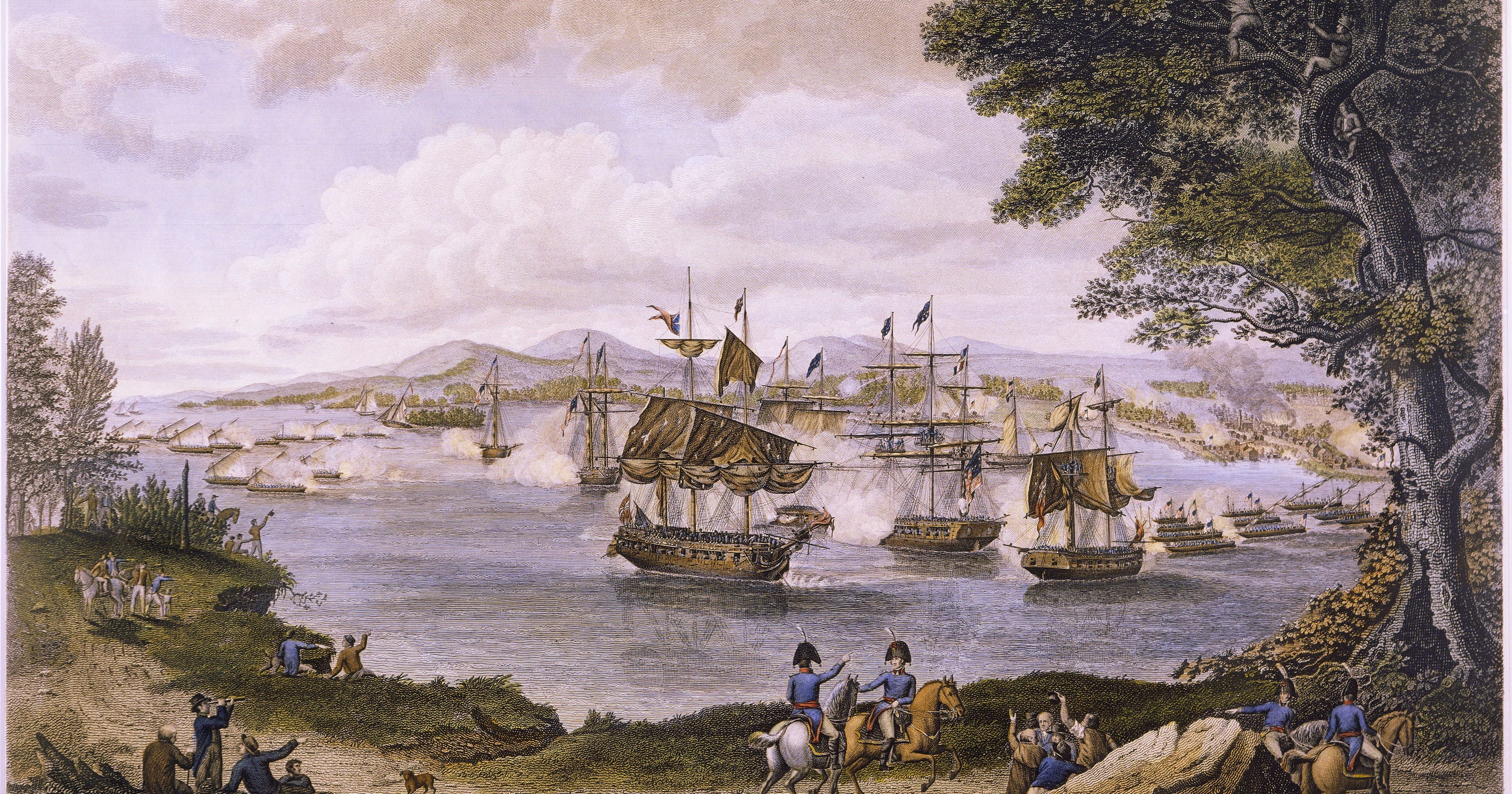
View from Cumberland Head, on Lake Champlain at the Battle of Plattsburg 11 September 1814

For all intents and purposes, the vessel was still unfinished at the time of the battle, with some workmen, including riggers and carpenters, still laboring on her completion right up to the days before. According to one source, at the time of the battle, the Confiance mounted 37 guns but actually carried 39, with two additional cannon aboard but having not yet been mounted. Admiralty records show that in reality, she mounted only 16 12-pounders when she went into battle.

Her crew was made up of a large number of untrained provincials. A company of the 39th Foot augmented the incomplete crew.

Shortly before 8 am, as the British squadron approached the northern tip of Cumberland Head, Downie ordered the guns of his ship scaled. This was a pre-arranged signal to the British land forces announcing his presence and his intent to engage the American fleet, basically informing them they could begin their offensive operations. At about 9 am, the British squadron rounded Cumberland Head close-hauled in line abreast with the large ships to the north initially in the order Chubb, Linnet, Confiance (flying a 23-foot British Naval White Ensign), Finch, and the gunboats to the south.

Macdonough had cleverly anchored his vessels in a line, each bow to stern, across the entrance of Plattsburgh Bay from Cumberland Head at the north, to Crab Island at the south. This forced Downie either to engage his vessels in the confusing winds of the Bay, or try to sail south around Crab Island, risking being caught between the guns of the American fleet and the guns of U.S.-held Fort Scott on the shore. The wind was light, and Downie was unable to maneuver Confiance across the head of Macdonough's line. As Confiance suffered increasing damage from the American ships, he was forced to drop anchor between 300 and 500 yards from Macdonough's flagship, the corvette USS Saratoga. Downie then proceeded deliberately, securing everything before firing a broadside that killed or wounded one fifth of Saratoga's crew. It was at this point, within a mere fifteen minutes after the opening of the engagement, that Commodore Downie was killed. He had been standing behind one of his vessel's 24-pounders, sighting it, when a round shot fired from the Saratoga struck the muzzle. This in turn had dismounted the 2,000-pound cannon from its carriage and sent it tipping up on end before sprawling on top of the commanding officer, crushing him to the deck and killing him instantly. One eyewitness later recorded how Downie appeared when the heavy gun was removed from his body:

His skin was not broken, a black mark about the size of a small plate was the only visible injury. His watch was found flattened, with its hands pointing to the very second at which he received the fatal blow.

Both flagships fought each other to a standstill. It has been surmised that the Confiance had also been equipped with a "shot furnace", a stove where solid iron round shot could be heated red hot before being quickly fired at an enemy vessel with the intention of setting it alight. The British apparently attempted this tactic several times during the engagement as the men on Saratoga had to extinguish on board fires at least three times. After Downie and several of the other officers had also been killed or injured, Confiance's fire became steadily less effective. Still, aboard Saratoga, almost all the starboard-side guns had been dismounted or put out of action.

At this critical moment, Macdonough ordered the bow anchor cut, and he hauled in the kedge anchors he had laid out earlier to spin Saratoga around. This allowed Saratoga to bring its undamaged port battery into action. The British flagship withered in the face of the renewed American fire, with one shot smashing a gaping 7-foot hole in her hull below the waterline. The Confiance began to list badly to starboard. Below decks, crewman scrambled to move weight to the port side in hopes of keeping the damaged planking above water. Likewise, men scurried to move her already amassing wounded to prevent them from being drowned by the rising water. Mr. Cox, the ship's carpenter, was later praised for having "drove in sixteen large shot plugs under the water line" during the action. The vessel's surviving lieutenant, James Robertson, tried to haul in on the springs to his only remaining anchor that hadn't been shot away to make a similar maneuver, but succeeded only in presenting the vulnerable stern to the American fire. Helpless, and now being raked by fresh broadsides from the American ship, Confiance could only surrender. She was forced to strike after a fierce two-hour-and-five-minute gun duel, during most of which she had been engaged with Macdonough's flagship. The last vestige of the British Squadron, HMS Linnet, itself barely a floating hulk, continued to fire defiantly for an additional fifteen minutes following the flagship's surrender. Macdonough simply hauled in further on his kedge anchors to bring his broadside to bear on the Linnet, which also could only surrender, after being pummeled almost to the point of sinking.

In his after action report to Secretary of the Navy William Jones, Commodore Macdonough estimated that during the battle the Confiance had sustained at least 105 hits from round shot. Daniel Records, assigned by Macdonough as the Confiance's prize master, later reported the extent of the damage to be "250 to 300 cannon shot in the hull and grape without number." Forty-one of her crew were killed, including Downie, and another eighty-three wounded. The loss of their commanding officer so early in the battle, arguably the most experienced officer in the British Squadron, had no doubt greatly improved the odds of an American victory. A local area judge, Julius Caesar Hubbell, was allowed to visit the ships of the American and British squadrons immediately following the action and later recounted the grisly scene he witnessed aboard Confiance:

... here was an absolutely horrible sight. The vessel was absolutely torn to pieces; the decks were strewed with mutilated bodies lying in all directions, and everything was covered with blood.

== Aftermath ==
Following the battle, the battered American ships and their equally battered prizes, many of which were in danger of sinking, including Confiance, were hastily repaired and the following month taken to the southernmost port on Lake Champlain, Whitehall, New York, where they were to be placed in Ordinary. On the trip down the lake, the passing vessels fired a salute to the battery at Burlington, Vermont. It would be the last time the guns of the fleet, and Confiance would ever fire.

Upon the vessel's arrival at Whitehall, she was taken into the U.S. Navy. After being laid up, the vessel served as Commodore Macdonough's headquarters during the winter of 1814–15. When the war ended, the ships of the ragtag fleet were stripped of their guns, rigging, and equipment, their decks were housed over to protect them from the elements, and the ships were anchored in a line along the main channel below town.

Understandably rot quickly spread through the green-timbered ships, and in 1820 they were towed into the nearby mouth of the Poultney River, known as East Bay, and formally abandoned. At their new moorings, the vessels were allowed to sink; the Confiance was the first of the five larger ships to settle into the river. This was in no small way aided by the fact that, in their haste to finish her, the British had used substandard materials in her construction. The Commander of the Whitehall Navy Yard at the time even commented that her scantlings were "of the very worst timber for building ships." Four years after her initial sinking, spring flooding washed the hull out of the river and into the main lake channel. The Navy Department ordered the hull moved and broken up, and dockyard records indicate that the hull was at least partially dismantled. The destruction must not have been complete, however, for a derelict hull marked "wreck of the Confiance" appears on an 1839 map of Whitehall prepared by the U.S. Corps of Topographical Engineers. The following year in 1825, the Navy decided to close the Whitehall station and sold all the remaining hulks to salvagers.

This was not to be the last "huzzah" of the Confiance, however. In 1873, after dredging work was being done on the river, the submerged hull of the Confiance, defiant to the last, slid into the deepened channel and blocked it. In view of this problem, Mr. J.J. Holden, a local contractor better known as "Nitroglycerine Jack," was called in to remove the obstacle. After a huge explosion, the only remains of the largest warship ever to sail on Lake Champlain were turned into a limited supply of walking canes, which were sold for a dollar apiece.

== Relics ==
Today there is nothing that remains of the wreck of the Confiance herself. However, several major relics from the vessel still exist and fortunately have been preserved:

- The White Ensign from the Confiance, taken as an American prize, survived long enough to be photographed in the late 19th century. Her ensign was on display at Mahan Hall at the U.S. Naval Academy, but was removed on 27 February 2018 for preservation.
- A 24-pounder cannon from the captured Confiance, actually the same gun responsible for the death of her commanding officer, Commodore George Downie, can be found today on display in front of Macdonough Hall at the United States Naval Academy in Annapolis Maryland. The indentation on the muzzle of this gun left by the ball from the USS Saratoga is still present.
- In 1996, sport divers located a massive main anchor from the Confiance which had been lost in Plattsburgh Bay during the 1814 Naval battle. Weighing almost 1 ton, the anchor underwent conservation work at the Lake Champlain Maritime Museum. It was given a round of mechanical cleaning (scraping the rust off) and then treated with tannic acid to seal the metal. After its cleaning and treatment, the anchor revealed a large dent in one of its flukes made by a cannonball hit. A maker's mark could also be clearly seen, from Hawks, Crawshay, & Co. in Gateshead, England. This anchor is currently on display in the lobby of City Hall in Plattsburgh, New York.

== The debris field ==
According to local sport divers, a debris field made up of wreckage from the Confiance, as well as the other vessels involved in the 1814 battle, still lies strewn across the floor of Lake Champlain beneath the site. This field purportedly consists of wreckage of all kinds that was cleared from the decks of the vessels and pushed over the side during and after the engagement. Also supposedly present are several cannon, possibly as many as thirteen, that were thrown overboard from the Confiance by the Americans following the British surrender to lighten her and correct a serious list as the vessel was actually in danger of sinking. To date, this debris field has never been fully explored or documented by professionals, but may be viewable from the surface on a magnetometer. Plattsburgh Bay, the actual scene of the engagement, was among the first sites in the United States to be declared a National Historic Landmark in 1960.

== Footnotes ==
Notes

Citations
