= James Robertson-Walker =

British Royal Navy captain

Captain James Robertson-Walker
- Born: 22 June 1783
- Died: 26 October 1858 (aged 75)
- Occupation: Royal Navy captain

James Robertson-Walker (22 June 1783 – 26 October 1858) was a British Royal Navy captain.

== Biography ==
Robertson-Walker was born on 22 June 1783, was eldest son of James Robertson, deputy-lieutenant of Ross-shire, and for many years collector of the customs at the port of Stornoway. His mother was Annabella, daughter of John Mackenzie of Ross. He probably served for some few years in merchant ships; he entered the navy in April 1801 as able seaman on board the Inspector sloop at Leith, but was moved into the Princess Charlotte frigate, in which, as midshipman and master's mate, he served for two years on the Irish station. In May 1803 he joined the Canopus, the flagship of Rear-admiral George Campbell off Toulon in 1804. From her in March 1805 he was moved to the Victory, in which he was present in the battle of Trafalgar. When the Victory was paid off in January 1806, Robertson was sent, at the request of Captain Hardy, to the Thames frigate, in which he went out to the West Indies; there in April 1807 he was moved to the Northumberland, the flagship of Sir Alexander Forrester Inglis Cochrane, with whom in December he went to the Belle-Isle. In April 1808 he was appointed acting-lieutenant of the Fawn, in which, and afterwards in the Hazard sloop, he was repeatedly engaged in boat actions with the batteries round the coast of Guadeloupe. On 21 July 1809 his rank of lieutenant was confirmed. He continued in the Hazard till October 1812, and was over and over again engaged with the enemy's batteries, either in the boats or in the ship herself. Several times he won the approval of the admiral, but it did not take the form of promotion; and in October 1812 he was appointed to the Antelope, the flagship of Sir John Thomas Duckworth. In her in 1813 he was in the Baltic, and in November was moved to the Vigo, the flagship of Rear-admiral Graham Moore. A few weeks later the Vigo was ordered to be paid off, and in February 1814 Robertson was sent out to North America for service on the lakes.

In September he joined the Confiance, a ship newly launched on Lake Champlain, and being fitted out by Captain George Downie. The English army of eleven thousand men, under the command of Sir George Prevost, had advanced against Plattsburg on the Saranac, then held by an American force estimated at two thousand men, but supported by a strong and heavily armed flotilla. Prevost sent repeated messages urging Downie to co-operate with him in the reduction of this place, and in language which, coming from an officer of Prevost's rank, admitted of no delay. The Confiance was not ready for service, her guns not fitted, her men made up of drafts of bad characters from the fleet, and only just got together when she weighed anchor on 11 Sept., and, in company with three smaller vessels and ten gunboats, crossed over to Plattsburg Bay. The American squadron was of nearly double the force; but Downie, relying on the promised co-operation of Prevost, closed with the enemy and engaged. But Prevost did not move; the gunboats shamefully ran away; one of the small vessels struck on a reef; Downie was killed; and Robertson, left in command, was obliged to surrender after the Confiance had sustained a loss of forty-one killed and eighty-three wounded, out of a complement of 270, and was herself sinking. Sir James Lucas Yeo, the naval commander-in-chief, preferred charges of gross misconduct against Prevost, who, however, died before he could be brought to trial. At the peace Robertson returned to England, was tried for the loss of the Confiance, and honourably acquitted. The next day, 29 August 1815, he was promoted to the rank of commander. He had no further service; on 28 July 1851 he was promoted to be captain on the retired list, and died on 26 October 1858. On 24 June 1824 he married, first, Ann, only daughter and heiress of William Walker of Gilgarran, near Whitehaven, and thereupon assumed the name of Walker. He married, secondly, Catherine (d. 1892), daughter of John Mackenzie of Ross. He left no issue.
