= USS Eagle (1814) =

United States Navy brig

History

United States
- Name: USS Eagle
- Builder: Adam and Noah Brown
- Launched: 11 August 1814
- Fate: Sold in 1825

General characteristics
- Type: Brig
- Displacement: 500 long tons (508 t)
- Propulsion: Sail
- Complement: 150 officers and enlisted
- Armament: 8 × 18-pounder guns + 12 × 32-pounder carronades

USS Eagle, a brig, was launched 11 August 1814 as Surprise at Vergennes, Vermont, by Adam and Noah Brown. She was renamed Eagle 6 September and placed under the command of Lieutenant R. Henley.

Barely finished in time to participate in the decisive Battle of Lake Champlain on 11 September 1814, Eagle rendered service. The first vessel in the American line, she fought HMS Chub, HMS Linnet, and HMS Confiance alongside the USS Saratoga. During the course of the battle she was holed 39 times and had 13 men killed and 20 wounded. After the battle she was laid up for preservation at Whitehall, New York, but was sold in 1825.
