= Incidents in the Life of John Edsall =

1831 autobiography

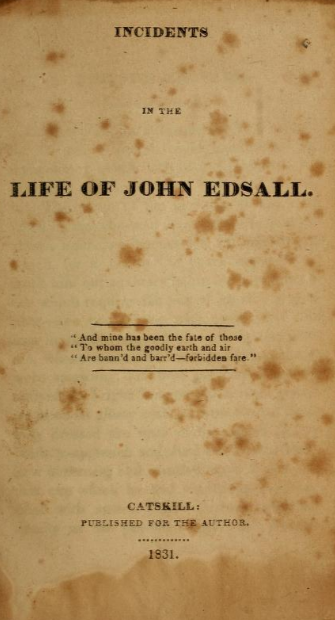
- Title page for Incidents in the Life of John Edsall (1831)
- Author: John Edsall
- Language: English
- Genre: Memoir
- Publication date: 1831
- Publication place: United States

Incidents in the Life of John Edsall is an autobiographical memoir published in Catskill, New York, in 1831. John Edsall (1788 – 1860) was an illiterate American sailor who participated in several historically significant voyages and events. The book describes itself as an oral account set down with the assistance of an editor who signed the descriptive foreword as "J.D.P.". It includes an attestation by several "gentlemen of high standing in the community" that the account "deserves the highest credit".

Edsall's seafaring adventures began at age 18 when he was inveigled into joining a mysterious voyage in 1806 that turned out to be the filibustering expedition to Venezuela of General Francisco de Miranda. This was one of the first attempts to liberate one of the Spanish colonies of South America, and was partially financed and supported by two Americans, Colonel William S. Smith and Samuel G. Ogden. Edsall had enlisted as a sailor on the principal ship of the expedition, the Leander. The initial effort ended disastrously for Edsall when two ships were captured off shore of Ocumare de la Costa by a Spanish warship. He and many others of the American sailors were imprisoned in San Felipe Castle of Puerto Cabello, and several were executed. He describes the miseries of a prolonged imprisonment, the death of several comrades, and their eventual escape from Cartagena de Indias.

He then served on several British merchant ships crossing the Atlantic, visiting London and Gibraltar, and ports throughout the Caribbean. He quarreled with his captain off the western coast of Africa and was discharged, cheated of his wages, and abandoned on Princes Island, in the Gulf of Guinea. He found another ship, managed to evade several attempted impressments by British navy ships, but eventually in 1812 was impressed to serve on the brig Burlette, which was convoying a merchant fleet through the Baltic Sea to Russia during the Gunboat War between Britain and Denmark during the Napoleonic Wars. He describes naval actions with the Danes.

Edsall was serving in the British navy at the time of the outbreak of the War of 1812. Edsall and four other American sailors applied for discharge when this news reached their ship in the Baltic, but on the return to England, they were shipwrecked on the coast of Sweden. Edsall and a few survived and found refuge with the American consul in Gothenburg, Sweden.

Although he eventually reached the United States, he was forced by hardship to enlist in the American navy, in the squadron of Commodore Oliver Hazard Perry. In 1814 Edsall volunteered for detachment to the fleet on Lake Champlain commanded by Thomas Macdonough and was appointed master-at-arms on the Saratoga. At the Battle of Plattsburgh the small American fleet repelled the British invasion of Lake Champlain. Two official reports by Master Commandant Macdonough and Lieutenant Robert Henley describing the action are included in Edsall's book.

As the war wound down, Edsall was transferred to the first American ship of the line, the Independence, when it sailed from Boston harbor in 1815 to Tripoli under Commodore William Bainbridge to help enforce the suppression of the Barbary pirates.

At the conclusion of the mission, Edsall returned to New York, where he arranged a satisfying confrontation with the New York butcher who had tricked him into enlisting on the Leander 9 years earlier. He returned to merchant seafaring for another year or two, making several voyages between New York and ports to the south. Edsall finally had his fill of sailing around 1816 and found work butchering in Catskill, where he lived for 15 years and married, before narrating the events of this book.

Apart from the adventures themselves, limited personal information is provided. Edsall says he was born May 2, 1788, on a farm in the "English Neighborhood" of Bergen County, New Jersey. He died 9 January 1860 and is buried in Catskill Village Cemetery, Catskill, Greene Co., New York. He describes being apprenticed to a butcher in New York City, and plying that trade in between, and after, his seafaring. His wife at the time of his death and with whom he is buried is one Hannah Pickett (1798–1872). He was head of a household in Catskill as of the census of 1850 and 1855. He also appears in the Catskill, Greene County, NY censuses for the years 1830 and 1840.

== See also ==
A complete copy of the book
