= Reinagle =

Reinagle is a surname. Notable people with the surname include:

- Alexander Reinagle (1756–1809), English-born American composer and organist
- Caroline Reinagle (born Orger; 1818–1892), English composer, pianist, and writer
- George Philip Reinagle (1802–1835), English marine painter, son of Ramsay Richard Reinagle
- Hugh Reinagle (c. 1790–1834), American painter
- Joseph Reinagle (1762–1836), English music composer and cellist
- Philip Reinagle (1749–1833), English animal, landscape and botanical painter
- Ramsay Richard Reinagle (1775–1862), English portrait, landscape and animal painter, and son of Philip Reinagle
