= USS Allen =

Two ships of the United States Navy have been named Allen, for William Henry Allen.

- USS Allen (1814), a row galley built in 1814.
- USS Allen (DD-66), a Sampson-class destroyer launched in 1916 and scrapped in 1948.
