= Daniel Pring =

British Royal Navy officer (1788–1846)

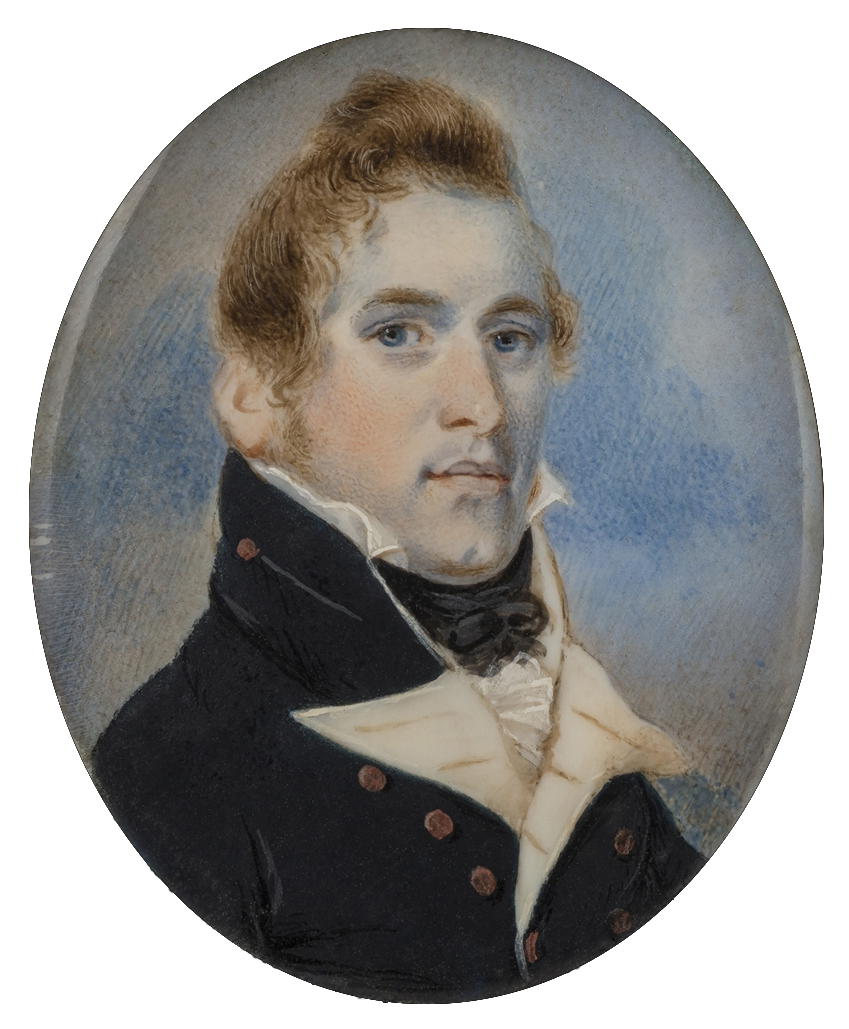
- Portrait attributed to Thomas Richmond, c. 1810
- Born: c. 1788; Honiton, Devon, England
- Died: 29 November 1846 (aged 57–58); Port Royal, Colony of Jamaica
- Spouse: Sarah Anne Wemyss (m. 1810)
- Relatives: John Taylor (brother-in-law)
- Military career
- Allegiance: Great Britain; United Kingdom
- Branch: Royal Navy
- Service years: 1800–1816; 1836–1846
- Rank: Commodore
- Commands: HMS Paz; HMS Wolfe; HMS Linnet; HMS Inconstant; HMS Thunderer; HMS Imaum
- Conflicts: British invasions of the River Plate; War of 1812; Battle of Lacolle Mills; Battle of Plattsburgh

Daniel Pring (c. 1788 – 29 November 1846) was an officer in the British Royal Navy. He is best known for the part he played in the War of 1812 between Britain and the United States.

He was born near Honiton in Devon. He entered the Navy in 1800, and evidently took part in the abortive British invasions of the Río de la Plata, as in 1807 he was appointed Lieutenant and commander of the schooner HMS Paz, taken as a prize at Montevideo. His promotion to Lieutenant was confirmed in 1808. In 1810, he married Sarah Anne Wemyss from Dundee.

In 1811, he was serving aboard HMS Africa, the flagship of Vice Admiral Sir Herbert Sawyer, the commander in chief of the North American station based at Halifax, Nova Scotia. The following year, he transferred to HMS San Domingo, the flagship of Sawyer's successor, Vice Admiral Sir John Borlase Warren. He was one of three Lieutenants (the other two being Robert Finnis and Robert Heriot Barclay) detached by Warren to the naval establishment on the Great Lakes, with the acting rank of Commander. The Admiralty however had independently appointed Captain Sir James Lucas Yeo as Commodore to command on the lakes. During the early part of 1813, Pring served as commander of HMS Wolfe, which carried Yeo's broad pendant.

Later in 1813, Pring was appointed to the naval establishment on Lake Champlain, based at Ile aux Noix in the Richelieu River. He was temporarily superseded by Commander Thomas Everard (who was senior to Pring) during several destructive raids against American outposts and depots on Lake Champlain during the late summer of 1813. During the early months of 1814, Pring commanded gunboats which played a part in the Battle of Lacolle Mills.

In the spring of 1814, the Americans constructed a substantial flotilla on Lake Champlain, which outmatched Pring's force. In response, the British laid down the fifth rate frigate HMS Confiance. This was a ship which required a Post Captain in command, so Pring was superseded by Captain George Downie. Pring took charge of the 16-gun brig Linnet. During the Battle of Plattsburgh, Pring anchored the Linnet across the head of the American line of battle and did great damage, but Downie was killed and the Confiance and two other British armed vessels were forced to surrender. Left isolated and unable to escape, Pring fought on until the Linnet was battered almost to the point of sinking. In his report, Pring paid tribute to the gallantry of Downie, and also to the care paid to the prisoners and wounded by his opponent, Master Commandant Thomas Macdonough.

As was customary after any defeat, Pring faced a court martial between 18 and 21 August 1815 aboard HMS Gladiator, but was exonerated and honourably commended. The next year, he was promoted Post Captain. He briefly commanded the naval establishment on Lake Erie, but this was soon closed down. Pring then went on half pay for 20 years, living at Ivedon Penn near Honiton.

In 1836, he returned to active service, in command of the frigate HMS Inconstant. From 1841 until 1843, he commanded the second rate ship of the line HMS Thunderer. In 1845, he commanded the 76-gun ship of the line, HMS Imaum, and was appointed Commodore of the Jamaica Division as well as the shore establishment Jamaica Dockyard.

He died late in 1846 at Port Royal, Jamaica, possibly of yellow fever.

He and his wife apparently left no children.
