= USS Ticonderoga (1814) =

US Navy schooner

Coordinates: 43°33′18.43″N 73°24′7.98″W

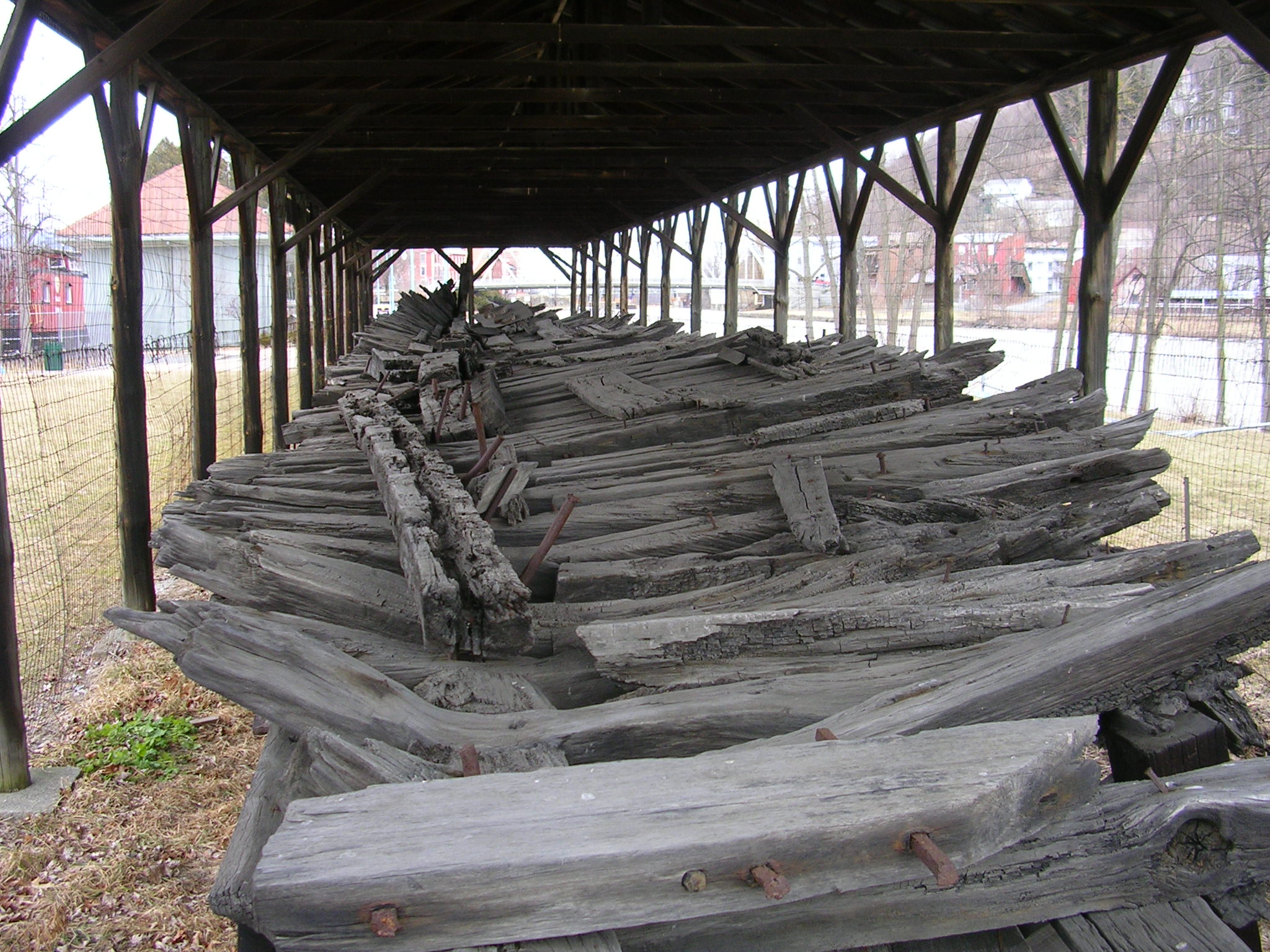
- Hull of the Ticonderoga on display at Whitehall, New York

History

United States
- Name: USS Ticonderoga
- Builder: Adam and Noah Brown
- Laid down: 1814
- Acquired: by purchase, 1814
- Commissioned: 12 May 1814
- Fate: Sold, 19 July 1825
- Notes: Remains on display in Whitehall, New York

General characteristics
- Type: Schooner
- Displacement: 350 long tons (356 t)
- Length: 120 ft (37 m)
- Armament: 8 × 12-pounder guns; 4 × 18-pounder guns; 3 × 32-pounder carronades

The USS Ticonderoga was a schooner which served in the United States Navy from 1814 to 1825. The first vessel in navy service by that name, she was built as a merchant steamer in 1814 at Vergennes, Vermont, purchased by the Navy at Lake Champlain, converted to a schooner, and relaunched on 12 May 1814.

== Service history ==
Ticonderoga served with Captain Thomas Macdonough's squadron during the Battle of Plattsburgh on 11 September 1814. Commanded by Lt. Stephen Cassin, Ticonderoga compelled sloop HMS Chubb (formerly USS Growler) to surrender after riddling her with shot and forcing her aground. She also assisted in the capture of sloop HMS Finch (formerly USS Eagle), and repelled several boarding attempts by British gunboats. Midshipman Hiram Paulding was on board Ticonderoga during the battle and used his pistol to discharge a cannon when firing matches proved defective. During the two-and-one-half-hour engagement, six members of Ticonderoga's crew were killed, and six others were wounded.

After the war, Ticonderoga was laid up at Whitehall, New York. A decade later, she was pronounced unworthy of repair and sold at public sale on 19 July 1825.

She was rediscovered in 1958, raised and "salvaged" the next year; the wooden remains of this historic vessel are now on public display in Whitehall, New York.

== Bibliography ==
- Maclay, Edgar Stanton (1894). A history of the United States Navy, from 1775 to 1893.
  D. Appleton & Company, New York. p. 647. Url
- Roosevelt, Theodore (1883). The naval war of 1812.
  G.P. Putnam's sons, New York. p. 541. Url
