= HMS Linnet (1814) =

Brig of the Royal Navy

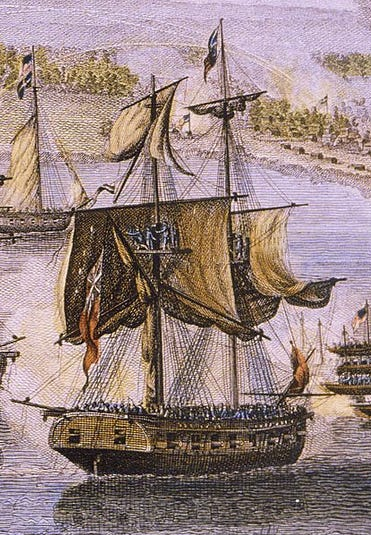
- Linnet

History

United Kingdom
- Name: HMS Linnet
- Builder: Isle de Noix, Lake Champlain
- Launched: April 1814
- Captured: 11 September 1814

United States
- Name: USS Linnet
- Acquired: By capture, 11 September 1814
- Fate: Sold 1825

General characteristics
- Class & type: 16-gun brig-sloop
- Tons burthen: 350 (bm)
- Length: 82 ft 6 in (25.1 m)
- Beam: 27 ft (8.2 m)
- Depth of hold: 6 ft 8 in (2.0 m)
- Propulsion: Sails
- Sail plan: Brig
- Complement: 99
- Armament: 16 × 12-pounder guns

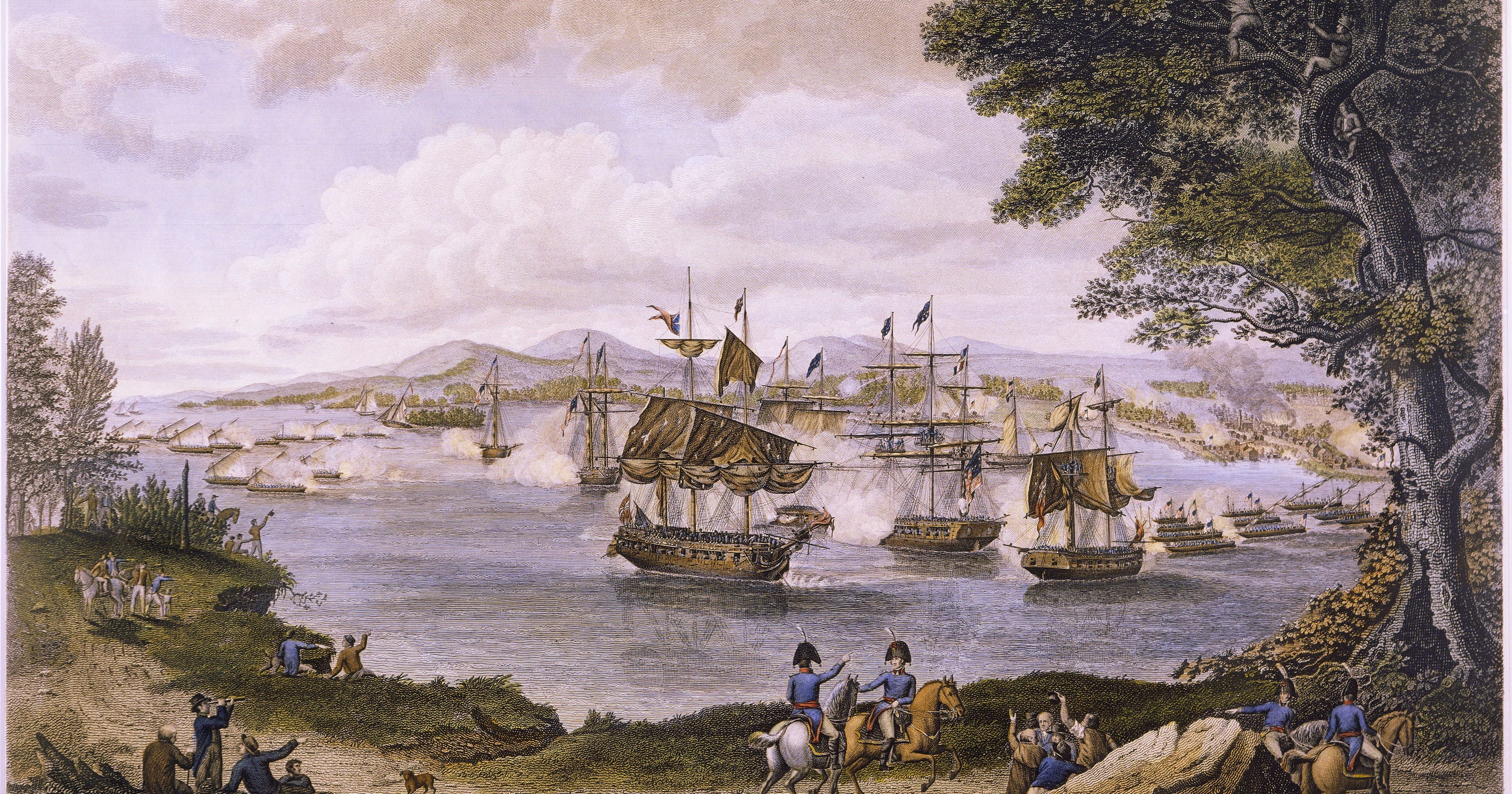
Linnet viewed from Cumberland Head, on Lake Champlain at the Battle of Plattsburg 11 September 1814

HMS Linnet was a 16-gun brig, built in 1814 by the Royal Navy at Ile aux Noix, Canada, as Niagara. Renamed Linnet and commanded by Commander Daniel Pring, RN, she served on Lake Champlain during the War of 1812. The Americans captured her in 1814 at the Battle of Lake Champlain at Plattsburgh, New York, and took her into service though she never sailed again. She was sold in 1825.

== Service ==
Linnet joined Capt. George Downie's squadron, taking part in the Battle of Lake Champlain on 11 September 1814. Sailing down the bay, Linnet engaged the American brig Eagle, of 18 guns. Linnet did much damage to Eagle until Commodore Thomas Macdonough's flagship Saratoga raked Linnet, causing her to strike. Linnet had sustained losses of 10 killed and 15 wounded.

== Fate ==
The Americans repaired Linnet and took her into the U.S. Navy as the USS Linnet. However, because the War of 1812 was over by that time, they placed her in ordinary at Whitehall, New York. She was sold in 1825.
