= USS Viper (1814) =

Heavily armed row galley

History

United States
- Name: USS Viper
- Completed: Mid-1814 at Vergennes, Vermont
- Commissioned: Mid-1814
- Decommissioned: 1815
- Fate: Sold at public sale in 1825

General characteristics
- Type: gunboat
- Length: 75 ft (23 m)
- Beam: 15 ft (4.6 m)
- Draft: 4 ft (1.2 m)
- Propulsion: Oars
- Armament: 1 × 24-pounder gun; 1 × 18-pounder Columbiad

USS Viper was a heavily armed row galley commissioned by the United States Navy for service in the War of 1812. She was successful in her operations against the British on Lake Champlain, and was retired after the war.

== Built in Vermont ==
The second ship to be so named by the Navy, Viper was one of six large row galleys hastily built and commissioned in the mid-1814 at Vergennes, Vermont, for use by Commodore Thomas Macdonough against the British on Lake Champlain.

== Service in the War of 1812 ==
Under the command of Lieutenant Francis Mitchell, Viper participated in the defeat of the British squadron, under Commodore George Downie, off Plattsburgh, New York, on 11 September 1814, where she helped drive British gunboats back towards Canada.

This American naval victory ended English attempts to invade and split the United States in two by way of the Lake Champlain-Hudson River corridor, immeasurably strengthening the American bargaining position during peace negotiations at Ghent. Viper remained with the squadron for the remainder of the war but, with the return of peace, was partially dismantled and laid up at Whitehall, New York.

== Post-war disposition ==
Viper was sold at Whitehall at public sale in 1825.
