= USS Allen (1814) =

Row galley built in 1814

History

United States
- Name: Allen
- Namesake: William Henry Allen
- Builder: Adam and Noah Brown, Vergennes, Vermont
- Launched: 1814
- Commissioned: 1814
- Fate: Sold, 1824 or 1825.

General characteristics
- Type: row galley
- Tons burthen: 70 tons
- Length: 75 ft (23 m)
- Beam: 15 ft (4.6 m)
- Depth of hold: 4 ft (1.2 m)
- Complement: 40
- Armament: 1 × 24-pounder gun; 1 × 18-pounder columbiad

USS Allen was a row galley built in 1814 at Vergennes, Vermont, by Adam and Noah Brown. She was commissioned during the summer of 1814, with Sailing Master William M. Robins in command. She became a unit of Commodore Thomas Macdonough's squadron on Lake Champlain and participated in the Battle of Lake Champlain in September 1814, during which the American squadron captured the remnants of the British squadron under Captain George Downie. After the War of 1812, she remained in active service for another decade. She was sold at Whitehall, New York, sometime in late 1824 or early 1825.
