= USS Growler (1812 sloop) =

Sloops-of-war of the United States Navy

History

United States
- Name: USS Growler
- Launched: 1812.
- Acquired: Purchased, 1812
- Fate: Captured by the British, 3 June 1813

United Kingdom
- Name: HMS Shannon; HMS Chub
- Acquired: 3 June 1813
- Fate: Re-captured by the Americans, 11 September 1814

United States
- Name: USS Growler
- Acquired: 11 September 1814
- Fate: Sold, July 1815

General characteristics
- Type: Sloop-of-war
- Tons burthen: 112 (bm)
- Length: 64 ft (20 m)
- Beam: 20 ft 4 in (6.20 m)
- Draft: 5 ft 8 in (1.73 m)
- Propulsion: Sail
- Armament: 10 × 18-pounder carronades + 1 × 6-pounder gun

USS Growler was a 112-ton sloop-of-war, armed with ten 18-pounders and one 6-pounder, during the War of 1812. The United States Navy purchased Growler on Lake Champlain in 1812. The British captured her in 1813 and renamed her HMS Chub or Chubb. (Note: This is the history per DANFS and the NMM. Hepper has Growler becoming Finch, and USS Eagle becoming Chub. Winfield has no mention of Finch, and agrees with Hepper re Eagle/Chubb.) The Americans recaptured her at the Battle of Lake Champlain. She was sold in 1815.

== American service and capture ==
Growler cruised under the command of Lieutenant Sidney Smith as part of Commodore Thomas Macdonough's squadron. Major George Taylor of the 100th Regiment captured Growler on 3 June 1813 on the Sorrell River near Ile aux Noix on the Canadian side of the lake and took her into the Royal Navy as HMS Shannon. (Note: Taylor also captured another American vessel, Eagle, also a 10-gun brig. She was initially named Broke, and later Finch.) They later renamed her HMS Chubb or Chub.

== British service and recapture ==
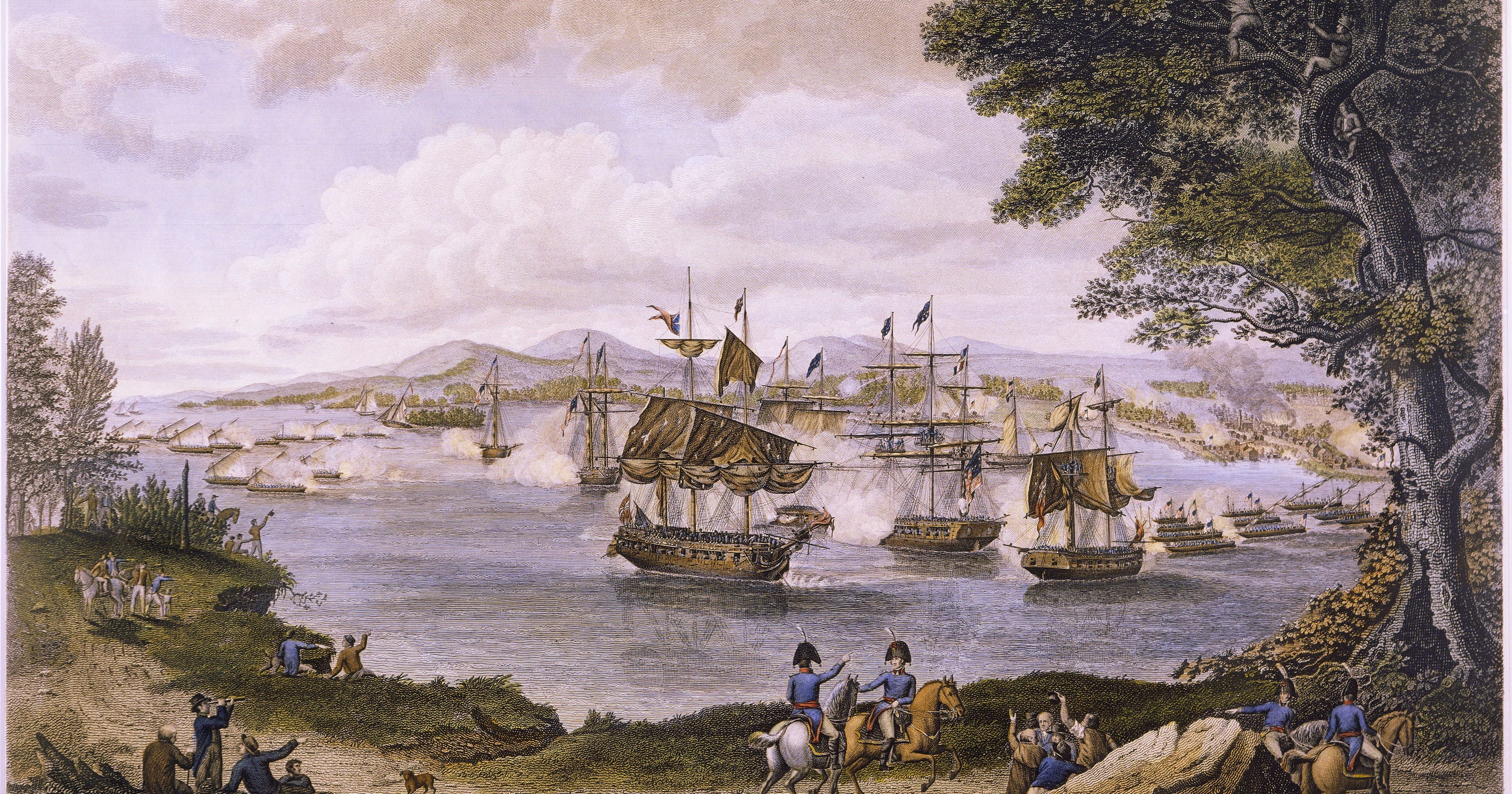
View from Cumberland Head, on Lake Champlain at the Battle of Plattsburg on 11 September 1814

Chub was under the command of Lieutenant James McGhie on 11 September 1814 at the Battle of Lake Champlain. McGhie was ordered to support HMS Linnet in her attack on USS Eagle. Chub reached her station relatively unscathed and anchored. In the engagement Chub lost her main boom and bowsprit, and had her anchor cable severed. She drifted into the American line where she struck her colors to USS Saratoga. She had lost six men killed and 16 wounded. At McGhie's court martial for the loss of his ship, the board severely reprimanded him for not coming into action properly and for failing to anchor properly.

== Fate ==
After the Americans recaptured the vessel, the sloop-of-war saw no further service. The Americans sold her at Whitehall, New York, in July 1815.
