= USS Eagle (1812) =

Sloops-of-war of the United States Navy

History

United States
- Name: USS Eagle
- Builder: A & N Brown, Vergennes, Vermont
- Acquired: Purchased
- Fate: Captured by the British, 3 June 1813

United Kingdom
- Name: HMS Broke; HMS Finch
- Acquired: Captured, 3 June 1813
- Fate: Lost at the Battle of Lake Champlain, 11 September 1814

United States
- Name: USS Eagle
- Acquired: Captured, 11 September 1814
- Fate: Sold, July 1815

General characteristics
- Type: Sloop or brig
- Tons burthen: 110 (bm)
- Length: 64 ft (20 m)
- Beam: 20 ft 4 in (6.20 m)
- Draft: 5 ft 8 in (1.73 m)
- Propulsion: Sail
- Complement: 50 officers and enlisted
- Armament: 11 guns

USS Eagle, was a ship which served in the United States Navy in 1813-1815. Originally a merchant sloop, she was purchased at Vergennes, Vermont on Lake Champlain in 1812 and fitted as either sloop of war or brig for naval service. The British captured her in 1813 and renamed her HMS Finch, only to lose her back to the Americans at the Battle of Lake Champlain in 1814. (Note: This is the history per DANFS and the NMM. Hepper has the USS Growler becoming Finch, and Eagle becoming Chub. Winfield has no mention of Finch, and agrees with Hepper re Eagle/Chubb.) She was sold in 1815.

== American service and capture ==
She cruised on the lake under the command of Sailing Master J. Loomis as a member of Commodore Thomas Macdonough's squadron blockading the British advance from Canada. Major George Taylor of the 100th Regiment captured Eagle on 3 June 1813 on the Sorrell River near Ile aux Noix on the Canadian side of the lake, after a fight of three-and-a-half hours; British casualties were three men wounded and American casualties were one man killed and eight severely wounded. (Both vessels were taken into Royal Navy service, but the Americans recaptured them the next year.) (Note: Prize money in the amount of £5 7s 10d currency per share was awarded, with a private being allocated one share and a major 30 shares, though an officer commanding independently, such as Taylor, received a double allocation.) The British took her into the Royal Navy as HMS Broke but later renamed her HMS Finch.

== British service and recapture ==
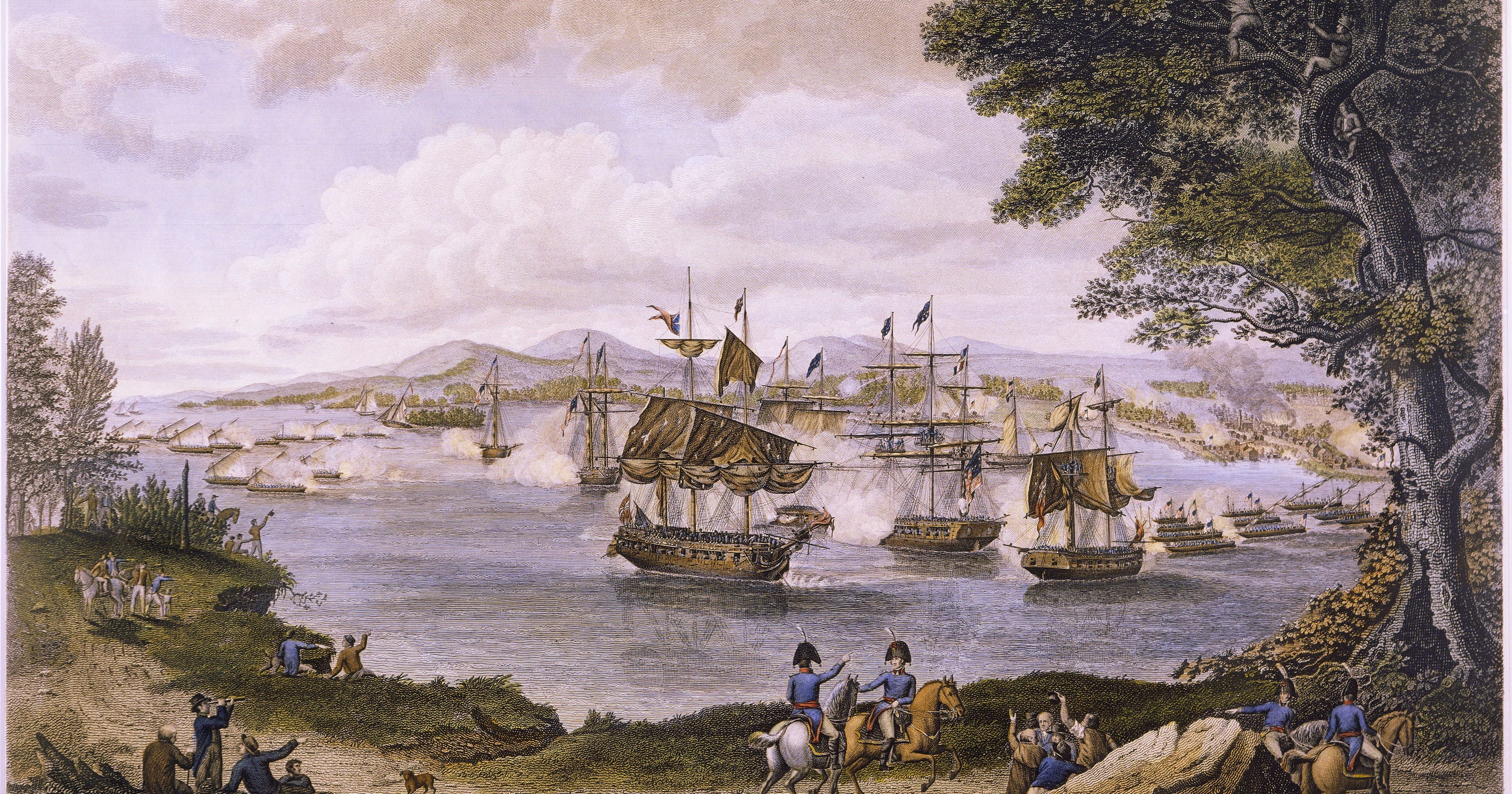
View from Cumberland Head, on Lake Champlain at the Battle of Plattsburg 11 September 1814

Finch accompanied the expedition that burned the arsenal and storehouses at Plattsburgh, New York. She was under the command of Lieutenant William Hicks on 11 September 1814 at the Battle of Lake Champlain. She was bringing up the rear of the British line together with some gunboats. She was ordered to sail towards and engage the USS Preble, a sloop of seven guns. As she did so, the schooner USS Ticonderoga fired on Finch shooting away her rigging. Finch ran aground near Crab Island where a small American shore battery commenced firing on her. Unable to free herself, and with two men wounded, Hicks struck the colors.

== Fate ==
After the Americans recaptured Finch they took her back into the U.S. Navy under her original name. After the war, she was sold in July 1815 at Whitehall, New York.

== See also ==
- List of sloops of war of the United States Navy
- List of ships captured in the 19th century

== Footnotes ==
Notes

Citations
