= 100th Regiment of Foot (Prince Regent's County of Dublin Regiment) =

- Active: 1804–1818
- Country: (United Kingdom of Great Britain and Ireland) United Kingdom
- Branch: British Army
- Type: Line Infantry
- Size: One battalion
- Engagements: War of 1812

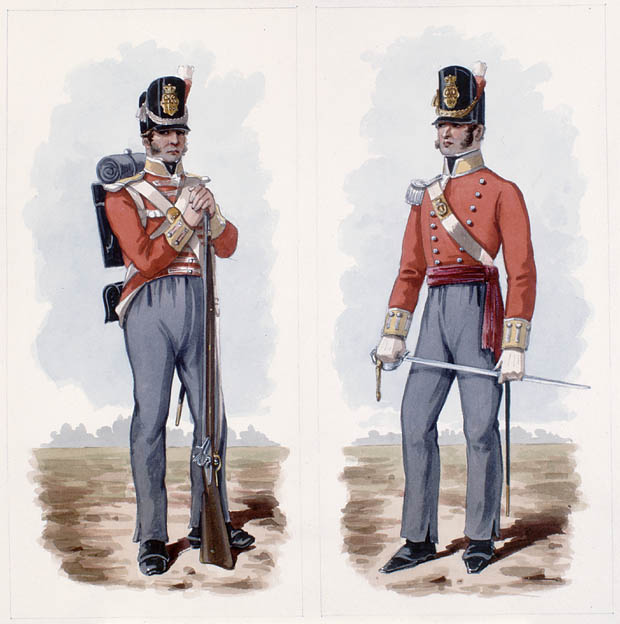
A regimental private and officer in 1812–1814

The 100th Regiment of Foot (Prince Regent's County of Dublin Regiment) was raised in Ireland in 1804 for service in the Napoleonic Wars. It was stationed in North America from 1805 to 1818, with service in the War of 1812. On its disbandment in 1818, many men of the regiment were discharged in Canada to settle on land there.

== History ==
The regiment was raised in Ireland as the 100th Regiment of Foot for service in the Napoleonic Wars in 1804. After a few weeks, Lieutenant Colonel John Murray was appointed to command; he was to remain in this post for most of the regiment's active service.

The 100th were transferred to Nova Scotia in 1805, with 271 men being lost when the troopship Aeneas was wrecked off Newfoundland. They were then stationed in Canada proper. In 1807, Colonel Isaac Brock, then serving on the staff in North America, reported favourably on the regiment while they were serving as garrison for Quebec City, and commented, "The men were principally raised in the north of Ireland, and are nearly all Protestants; they are robust, active, and good looking."

During the War of 1812 the regiment served on the Canadian frontier. A detachment was present at the Battle of Sackett's Harbour in May 1813. Major George Taylor captured two 10-gun American vessels, the Growler and Eagle, on 3 June 1813 on the Sorrell River near Île aux Noix on the Canadian side of the lake, after a fight of three-and-a-half hours; British casualties were three men wounded and American casualties were one man killed and eight severely wounded. (Both vessels were taken into Royal Navy service, but the Americans recaptured them the next year.) (Note: Prize money in the amount of £5 7s 10d currency per share was awarded, with a private being allocated one share and a major 30 shares, though an officer commanding independently, such as Taylor, received a double allocation.) The regiment was given an extra descriptor as the 100th Regiment of Foot (Prince Regent's County of Dublin Regiment) in 1813.

The whole regiment took part in the Capture of Fort Niagara in December 1813. From there, they were engaged on raids to Buffalo and Black Rock in late December 1813.

In July 1814, the regiment saw action at the Battle of Chippawa (or Street's Creek), where the regiment took heavy losses, reduced to "one Captain & 3 subalterns doing duty, with 250 effective men". They then served at the Siege of Fort Erie in the closing months of the year. For their services in the defence of Canada, they were awarded the battle honour Niagara. The Colonel of the Regiment was Brig. Sir Frederick John Falkiner, Bt.

In February 1816 the regiment was renumbered as the 99th Regiment of Foot (Prince Regent's County of Dublin Regiment), then withdrawn to England in 1818 to be disbanded at Chatham. As the Napoleonic Wars ended, England was faced with thousands of returning soldiers. Rather than having them all return to England and Ireland, many of soldiers of the 100th Foot were offered and accepted land-grants in Upper Canada. The largest settlement from the 100th Foot was in Richmond, Ontario. The transport Hussaren arrived at Quebec from Cowes on 31 May with 124 officers and men of the 76th and 99th Regiments of Foot.

== Colonels of the Regiment ==
Colonels of the Regiment were:

100th Regiment of Foot

- 1805–?1818: Brig. Sir Frederick John Falkiner, Bt.
- disbanded 1818
