= Crab Island (Lake Champlain) =

Island in Clinton County, New York, United States

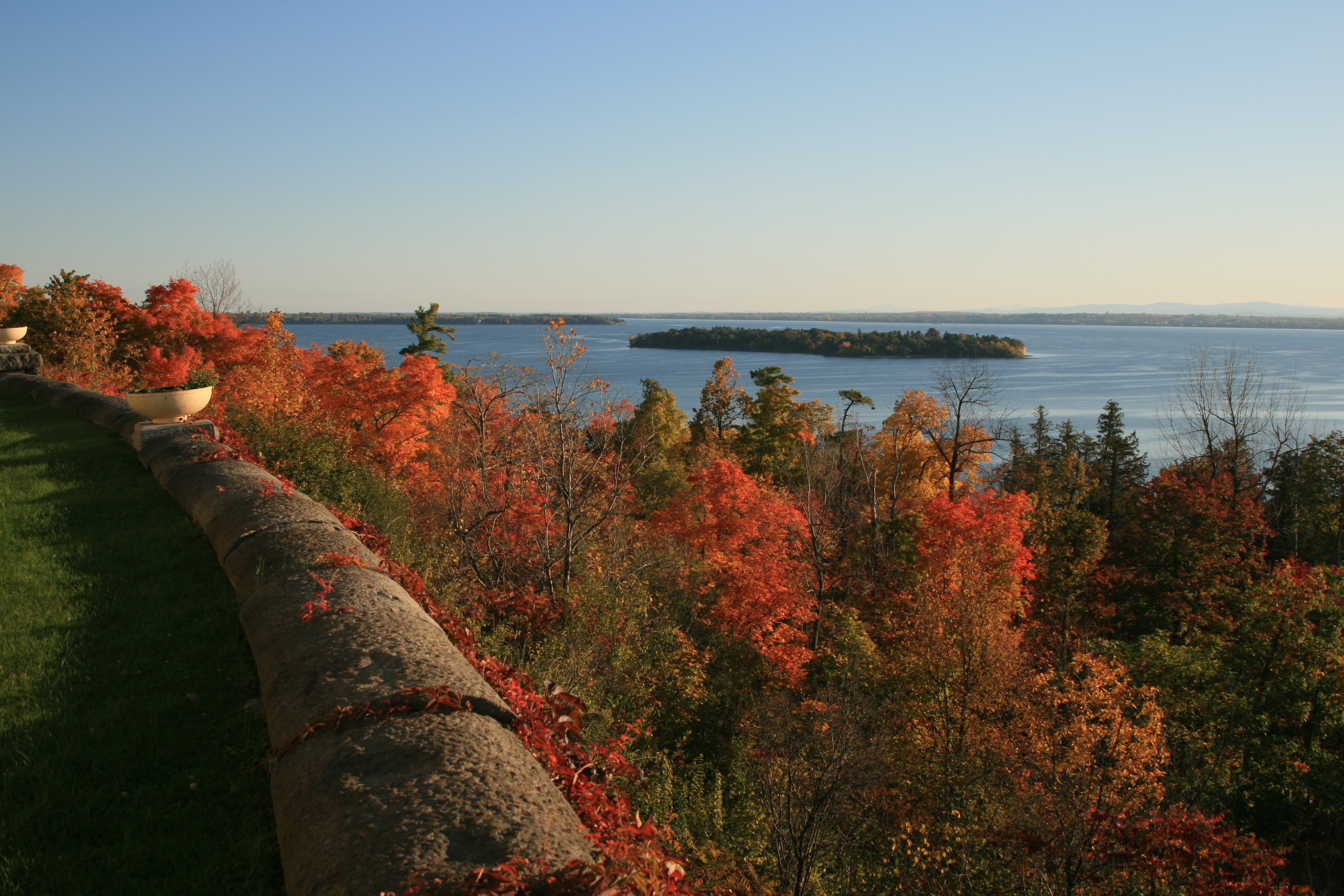
- View of Crab Island from Plattsburgh, New York.

- Location within New York

Geography
- Location: Lake Champlain
- Coordinates: 44.662°N 73.417°W
- Area: 40 acres (16 ha)
- Highest elevation: 112 ft (34.1 m)

Administration
- United States
- State: New York
- County: Clinton
- Town: Plattsburgh

Crab Island is a roughly 40-acre (0.16 km^{2}) limestone island situated in Lake Champlain just outside Plattsburgh Bay in the town of Plattsburgh in Clinton County in upstate New York. During the War of 1812, the island was utilized as a military field hospital for convalescent soldiers as well as both British and American casualties of the Battle of Plattsburgh. The island is the site of a mass grave believed to contain the remains of roughly 150 of those casualties.

Crab Island is infamous locally for its poison ivy, which grows abundantly on the island. Its name is thought to come from the large amounts of "crabs" (referring to fossilized shells, trilobites, and other fossils) found along the island's limestone shoreline.

== History ==
=== The naval battle ===
Crab Island played an important role during the September 1814 Battle of Plattsburgh. On the morning of September 11, 1814, the tiny island served as the southern end of Commodore Thomas Macdonough's battle line. Macdonough had moored his ships end to end between it and Cumberland Head to the north, forming a line across the entrance to Plattsburgh Bay. Macdonough strategised that this arrangement of his warships would either force the British to engage his anchored squadron immediately after rounding Cumberland Head, which would give him the advantage, or force them to sail farther south around Crab Island at his rear. In this case, the British ships would then come within range of the guns of the American fortifications ashore. To assist in this, a battery of two six-pounder (2.7 kg) cannon were also placed by the Americans on the northern tip of Crab island and were manned by a crew of convalescents from the field hospital. During the nearly two and a half hour action, an 11-gun British sloop, HMS Finch, commanded by Lieutenant William Hicks, ran hard aground on a reef just to the north-east of the island and became engaged in a fierce cannon duel with the Crab Island battery. Lieutenant Hicks would later recall that his crew "had the pleasure of killing or wounding every man at the guns on shore and silence them."

=== Hospital ===
The military hospital on Crab Island was first established around September 6, 1814, just prior to the Battle of Plattsburgh. The hospital consisted mainly of rows of "tents" quickly constructed of boards and canvas and several hastily built log structures. Convalescent or invalid soldiers who were unable to fight were initially evacuated to the island before the commencement of hostilities to prevent them from becoming caught up or overrun by the fighting ashore. Many of these were later transported in bateaux from Crab Island to a larger hospital at Burlington, Vermont, 25 miles (40 km) across the lake. The island's hospital was placed under the direction of a U.S. Army surgeon, Doctor James Mann. At the time, the number of invalids on the general hospital reports alone numbered 720 men. Following the naval battle, as the nearest point of land to it, the Crab Island hospital absorbed the dead and wounded of both fleets. The dead, including those that died on the island and those that washed ashore, numbered 150. They were buried shoulder to shoulder in three long trenches to the south of the hospital. The bodies of officers killed in the battle, including one initially buried on Crab Island, all received military burials in Plattsburgh's Riverside Cemetery, while the enlisted men were left in the mass graves out on the island. Crab Island is purported to be one of the only places in the world where both British and American soldiers were buried indiscriminately in the same graves. The actual site of the graves on Crab Island was never marked, and the exact site of their graves has never been established. Ninety-one of the deceased are known by name.

=== Aftermath ===
Memorials on Crab Island

Following years of effort by numerous Plattsburgh citizens, money for a proper memorial on the island was appropriated by Congress in the early 1900s. In 1903, a 100-foot (30 m) iron flagstaff, designed to be reminiscent of a ship's mast, was erected. This was followed in 1908 by the construction of a 50-foot (15 m) granite obelisk, known as the Crab Island Soldiers and Sailors Monument, which included commemorative bronze plaques on each face. A series of inter-connecting gravel paths were cleared allowing access for visitors and a wharf was built to accommodate boats. A full-time caretaker was hired to live in a small cottage on the island and in 1909, by act of Congress, the island was officially renamed Macdonough National Military Park.

By 1930, the island had been mostly abandoned. The one and only caretaker had left in 1915 and the caretaker's cottage burned in 1929. The island remained mostly devoid of activity until the 1950s, when United States Air Force personnel stationed at nearby Plattsburgh Air Force Base began a project of clearing portions of the island for a base recreational area. This initiative also proved short lived. In 1967, the Government auctioned the island off as surplus property, despite the presence of graves, monuments and a National Military Cemetery. Crab Island changed private hands several times throughout the proceeding decades and was only saved from development by the efforts of a vigilant few who succeeded in changing the island's zoning regulations.

== Crab Island State Park ==
Crab Island State Park
- Interactive map of Crab Island State Park
- Type: State park (Undeveloped)
- Location: Crab Island, Lake Champlain
- Nearest city: Plattsburgh, New York
- Area: 40 acres (0.16 km^{2})
- Created: 1988
- Operator: New York State Office of Parks, Recreation and Historic Preservation

In 1988, the New York State Office of Parks, Recreation and Historic Preservation created Crab Island State Park after acquiring the island in order to prevent private recreational development of the site.

The state had initially attempted to purchase the property in 1986, however they were outbid at that time by Roger Jakubowski, a New Jersey businessman who was actively purchasing large amounts of Adirondack property during the late 1980s. Jakubowski hoped to operate the island as a recreational venture, and planned to offer boat tours, picnic and barbecue facilities, and camping.

These uses were viewed as being detrimental to the historic and cultural value of the island, and public outcry led to New York State using eminent domain to appropriate the island in January 1988. The state ultimately paid Jakubowski $210,000 for the island, $20,000 more than he spent two years prior. In 1991, Jakubowski sued New York State for $1.5 million in damages relating to the seizure of Crab Island. The case was settled in 1994 for an undisclosed amount.

Although New York State has no plans to officially develop Crab Island State Park, volunteers have made progress in restoring the island's monuments and recreational features since the park's formation, including clearing the overgrown 1908 trail system. In August 2003, a dedicated group of volunteers restored and re-erected the island's unique iron flagpole, which had fallen in a windstorm in 1996. A bronze plaque placed at the foot of the flagpole memorializes the names of the American dead buried on the island.

== See also ==
- List of New York state parks
