= USS Preble (1813) =

1813 ship

History

United States
- Name: USS Preble
- Namesake: Edward Preble
- Acquired: 1813
- Commissioned: 6 August 1813
- Fate: Sold 1815

General characteristics
- Complement: 30
- Armament: 7 × 12-pounders; 2 × 18-pounders

USS Preble, sometimes called Commodore Preble, was a sloop which served in the United States Navy from 1813–1815. Named for Commodore Edward Preble, she was the first ship by that name in American naval service . Preble was purchased on Lake Champlain in 1813, commissioned 6 August, Lt. Charles Augustus Budd in command. Operating with Commodore Macdonough's squadron, she participated in the Battle of Lake Champlain, 11 September, which gave control of that lake to the Americans and forced General Prevost to retire back to Canada. Laid up after the battle, Preble was sold at Whitehall, New York, in July 1815.
