= Hugh Reinagle =

American painter

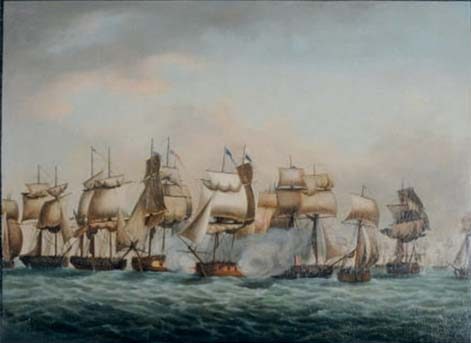
The battle of Lake Erie by Hugh Reinagle

Hugh Reinagle (c. 1790 – May 1834) was an American painter.

Born in Philadelphia, Reinagle studied under John J. Holland, and became known as a landscape painter, working in oil and watercolor. For many years, he worked as a scene painter in New York, and produced also a panorama of New York, which was exhibited in that city. In 1830, he went to New Orleans, where he died of cholera four years later. He was one of the original thirty members of the National Academy of Design, and exhibited there, in 1831, a View of the Falls of Mount Ida. His Macdonough's Victory on Lake Champlain was engraved by Benjamin Tanner in 1816.
