= USS Saratoga (1814) =

American warship built for service on Lake Champlain during the War of 1812.

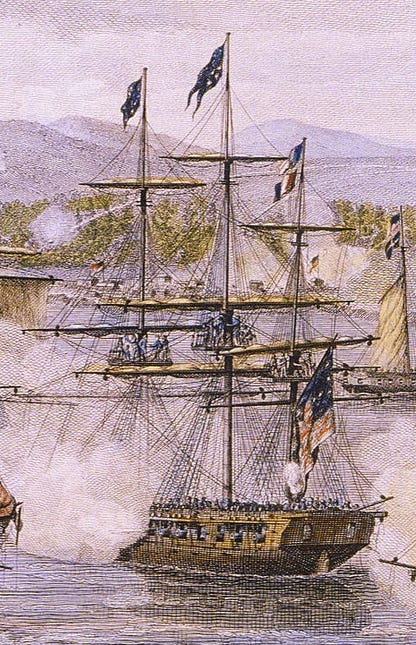
- Saratoga

History

United States
- Name: USS Saratoga
- Builder: Adam and Noah Brown
- Laid down: 7 March 1814
- Launched: 11 April 1814
- Fate: Sold, 1825

General characteristics
- Type: Corvette
- Displacement: 734 long tons (746 t)
- Length: 143 ft (44 m)
- Beam: 36 ft 6 in (11.13 m)
- Draft: 12 ft 6 in (3.81 m)
- Propulsion: Sail
- Complement: 212 officers and men
- Armament: 8 × long 24-pounder guns; 6 × 42-pounder carronades; 12 × 32-pounder carronades

USS Saratoga was a corvette built in Vergennes, Vermont, for service on Lake Champlain in the War of 1812. She was named for the Battles of Saratoga.

== Service history ==
Saratoga was laid down on 7 March 1814, launched on 11 April 1814 and she was christened April 6, the day that Napoleon abdicated. She was a Corvette weighing 734 tons, 143' long with a beam of 36'6" and a depth of hold 12'6". She had a complement of 212 with an armament of eight long 24-pounders, six 42-pounder carronades and twelve 32-pounder carronades. The Saratoga began her service on Lake Champlain as England was turning her attention and resources from the European continent to North America. British strategy envisaged a series of amphibious raids along the American coast as a diversion to cover a lethal thrust south from Canada down the strategic and already historic Lake Champlain-Hudson River corridor.

However, the completion of Saratoga put the United States ahead in the naval construction race on Lake Champlain; and Sir George Prevost, the Governor General of Canada and top British military commander in America, felt that supremacy afloat was a prerequisite to a successful invasion of the United States through the state of New York. He, therefore, delayed the start of his campaign until new naval construction had tipped the balance back in his favor.

Meanwhile, Master Commandant Thomas Macdonough, commander of American naval forces on the lake, took advantage of the edge which Saratoga had given him and sailed to the mouth of the Richelieu River. He proceeded to blockade the Richelieu for most of the following summer. Up the river at Ile aux Noix, the little British fleet, protected by shore batteries and by the river's narrow and tricky channel, waited while English shipwrights worked feverishly to complete HMS Confiance. The British launched the Confiance on 25 August 1814. She was a 36-gun frigate hastily fitted out for battle and the largest warship ever to sail on Lake Champlain.

=== Battle of Plattsburgh ===
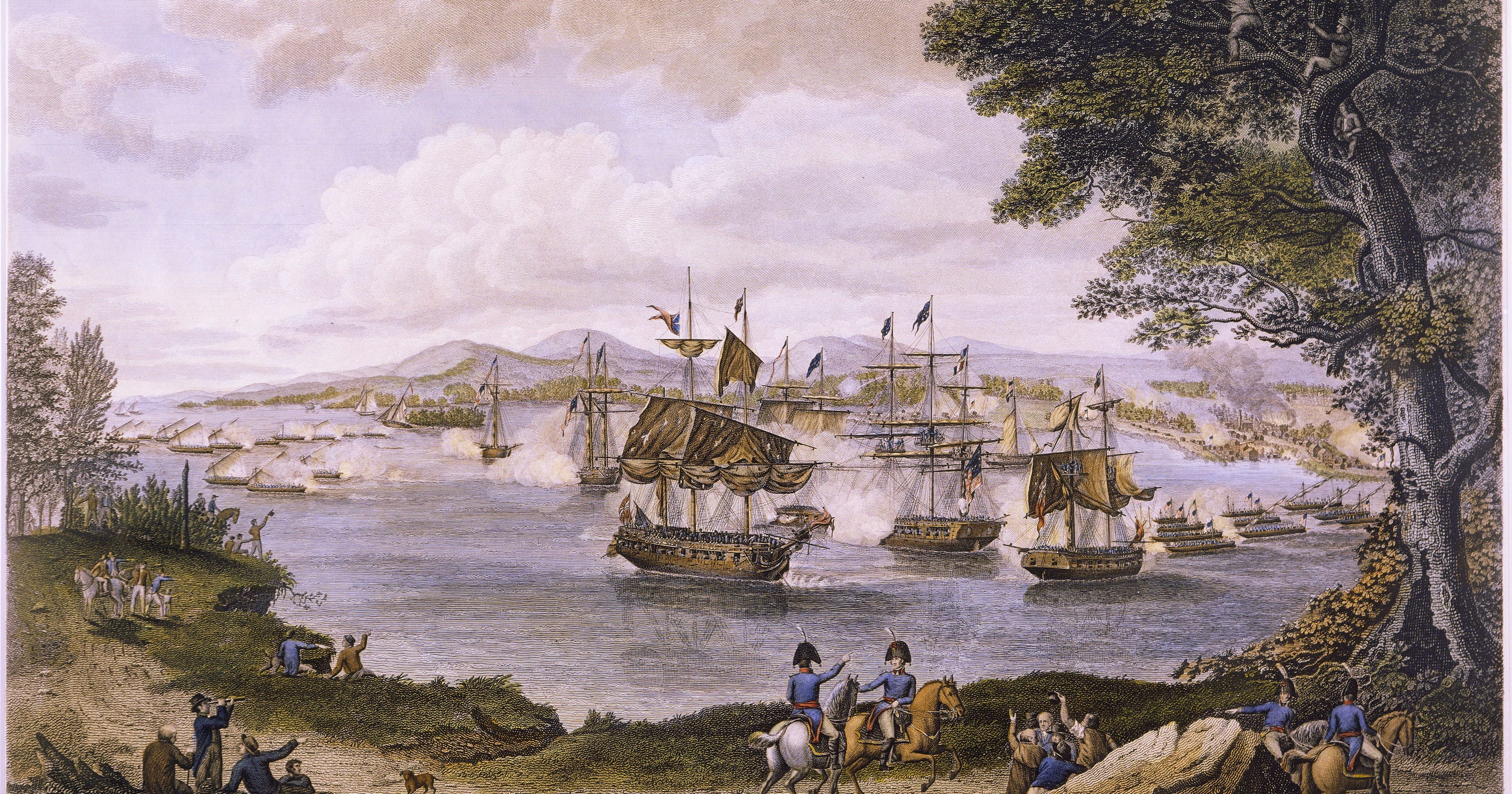
Battle of Plattsburg, an engraving by B. Tanner in 1816, after a painting by Hugh Reinagle

Master Commandant Macdonough, commanding officer of Saratoga as well as of the other American forces on the lake, had sailed back south. He had proceeded around Cumberland Head, New York; and entered Plattsburgh Bay. There, he deployed his ships across the mouth of the harbor in a strong defensive position where when the British fleet would attack them, they would be at a disadvantage of having to slowly and laboriously approach the line of American broadsides, against the wind and unable to bring most of their guns to bear.

As Master Commandant MacDonough awaited the arrival of the enemy, he dropped kedge anchors and arranged spring lines, which afforded his ships maximum maneuverability. He then had the crews practice turning their ships so that alternately starboard and port guns would face south.

During the construction race, crack British troops — veterans hardened in Wellington's bloody Peninsular Campaign — had been rushed from Spain to the St. Lawrence for the impending offensive. Before the end of August, the British Army had begun to march south along the western shore of Lake Champlain. Badly outnumbered, American ground forces withdrew before the English advance, crossed the Saranac River, and took prepared positions on the bluffs which overlook Plattsburgh Bay. On the morning of 11 September, when Commodore George Downie led the British squadron around Cumberland Head, Macdonough was ready. As British brig, Linnet, approached firing range, she opened the action with a salvo toward Saratoga. All but one of the projectiles fell short; and that solid shot was all but spent as it landed on the American corvette, bounced across her deck, and smashed a wooden poultry cage freeing a gamecock. The indignant rooster took to his wings and landed in the rigging. Facing the British warships, the cock defiantly called out challenge to battle.

Macdonough, himself, aimed a long 24-pounder at the bow of Confiance, pulled the lanyard firing Saratoga's first round, and gave the signal, "close action." The shot cut the British flagship's anchor cable, ripped up her deck, and smashed her helm. Then, all the American ships opened fire.

Confiance's first broadside struck Saratoga from point blank range, and the American flagship reeled from the blow. Half of her men were felled by the shock; but most of the sailors picked themselves up, carried their dead and wounded comrades below, and returned to the fray. Since Confiance's green gunners failed to reset the elevation of their barrels, each of her subsequent volleys tended to be higher than its predecessor and, while shredding Saratoga's rigging, did little structural damage to the ship.

After almost two hours' fighting, Saratoga's last serviceable starboard gun, a carronade, broke loose from its carriage and hurtled down the main hatch. Macdonough then dropped a stern anchor; cut his bow cable; and, with the help of tars hauling on lines to kedge anchors, swung the ship around bringing her fresh, port, broadside guns to bear on the enemy.

The badly battered British flagship, with Downie and her first lieutenant dead, also attempted to wind ship but was unable to do so. Helpless to do further harm to her adversary, Confiance struck her colors.

Then, by pulling on her starboard kedge line, Saratoga's sailors turned the corvette's guns toward Linnet and opened fire. The British brig, although severely damaged and unable to move, gallantly kept up the fight for about an hour before surrendering. At that time, Finch and Chub, the other two relatively large warships in the British squadron, were already in American hands; so the surviving English gunboats fled toward Canada.

Macdonough's victory in Plattsburgh Bay left the United States unchallenged on Lake Champlain and forced Prevost to retreat to Canada. This weakened the British position in negotiations at Ghent and enabled American commissioners to secure a favorable rather than a humiliating peace. It also helped to restore American morale after the recent burning of Washington, D.C.

After the war, Saratoga was laid up until sold at Whitehall, New York, in 1825.

Saratoga Passage, a body of water in Puget Sound, was named after the ship.
