= George Downie =

Royal Navy officer

Captain George Downie
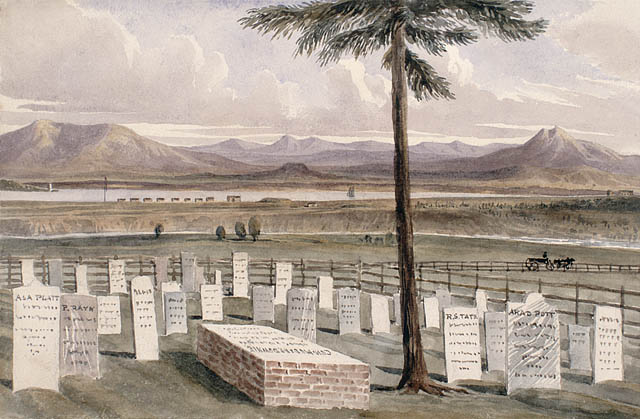
- Downie's tomb in Plattsburgh depicted in the 1840s
- Born: 19 January 1778; Tong, Lewis, Scotland
- Died: 11 September 1814 (aged 36) near Plattsburgh, New York
- Burial place: Riverside Cemetery, Plattsburgh; 44°41′35.58″N 73°27′33.78″W
- Military career
- Allegiance: Kingdom of Great Britain; United Kingdom
- Branch: Royal Navy
- Service years: c.1790–1814
- Rank: Captain
- Commands: HMS Royalist; HMS Montreal; HMS Confiance
- Conflicts: French Revolutionary Wars; Battle of Camperdown; Napoleonic Wars; War of 1812; Battle of Plattsburgh †

George Downie (19 January 1778 – 11 September 1814) was a Scottish officer of the British Royal Navy. During the War of 1812, he commanded a British squadron that fought an American squadron on Lake Champlain in the Battle of Plattsburgh, during which he was killed.

== Biography ==
=== Background and early career ===
Downie was born in the village of Tong near Stornoway on the Isle of Lewis in the Scottish Outer Hebrides. He was the son of The Reverend John Downie, minister of Stornoway, and Charlotte Mackenzie. He joined the Royal Navy in around 1790 as a midshipman, served aboard the frigate Circe, and saw action during the Battle of Camperdown on 11 October 1797. He then served aboard the frigates Melampus and Apollo in the West Indies for several years. He was promoted to acting-lieutenant, and after he returned to the United Kingdom on sick leave, his promotion was confirmed on 23 March 1802.

=== Lieutenant ===
In 1804 he was appointed to the 38-gun frigate Seahorse, and in May 1805 was serving as first lieutenant under the command of Captain the Honourable Courtenay Boyle, in the Mediterranean. On 4 May 1805, Boyle sighted a convoy of Spanish ships loaded with gunpowder at San Pedro, an anchorage east of Cape de Gata. Though under the protection of a fort, two armed schooners, and three gun and mortar launches, Downie was sent in a cutter to board the vessels while covered by the guns of Seahorse. Downie boarded and brought out a Spanish brig, laden with 1,170 quintals of powder while the Spanish gun-boats continued to fire on the Seahorse, damaging the main topgallant mast, shooting away several braces and bowlines, and killing a crewman. Seahorse then discontinued the engagement, wishing to leave the coast while the breeze and daylight lasted.

Downie was still first lieutenant of Seahorse in July 1808, under Captain John Stewart, patrolling in the Aegean Sea, when on 5 July she encountered two Turkish vessels off Skopelos. They were the Badere-Zaffer, a large frigate armed with fifty-two guns, mainly 12 and 24-pounders, but also two 42-pounders, and with a complement of 500 men under the command of Captain Scanderli Kichuc Ali. The other was the Alis Fezan, armed with twenty-four 13-pounders and two mortars, commanded by Captain Daragardi Ali, with a complement of 230. Despite being out-gunned and out-manned Seahorse engaged the Turks at 09:30 in the evening. At 10:00 he came up close alongside the Alis Fezan and within 15 minutes reduced her to a wreck, without sails and incapable of returning fire, and then engaged the larger Badere-Zaffer and in an action lasting until 01:15 reduced her to a motionless wreck. At dawn Stewart observed that her colours where still flying and so gave her a broadside into her stern, and she struck. Badere-Zaffer had suffered 165 men killed and 195 wounded; while Seahorse had 5 killed and 10 wounded, and lost her mizzen mast. On Stewart's recommendation Downie was subsequently promoted to commander.

=== Commander ===
Downie commanded the 18-gun Cruizer-class brig-sloop Royalist from 15 June 1810 to December 1812, operating in the English Channel and taking several prizes:

- On 18 December 1810 he captured the French lugger privateer l'Aventurier, of 14 guns and 50 men, off Fécamp.
- On 2 February 1811, in company with Castilian, he pursued and captured the French lugger privateer Le Braconnier, of 10 guns and 47 men, off the coast of France.
- On 19 December 1811, in company with Skylark and Rosario, he captured the French privateer La Rondeur.
- On 6 January 1812 he captured the French privateer La Furet, of 14 guns and 56 men, off Folkestone.
- On 28 December 1812 he captured the French privateer La Ruse.

=== Captain ===
Downie was promoted to captain on 1 January 1813, and was appointed to command of the sloop Montreal on Lake Ontario. In August 1814 he was appointed to Confiance, flagship of the British squadron on Lake Champlain, taking command of her on 3 September.

On 11 September 1814, during the Battle of Plattsburgh, Downie was leading into battle inexperienced crews, most of them from provincial units and not from the cream of the Royal Navy. The crew of Confiance consisted of 270 men; 86 Marines, artillerymen and soldiers, and the rest "volunteers" from ships at Quebec who were of inferior quality and bad character, several having been in irons. They were all strangers to each other and to their officers; Downie was acquainted with no officer on board his ship except his first lieutenant. The American forces had both time to prepare and were readily familiar with that area of the Lake. Early in the ensuing battle, Downie was crushed by a cannon aboard his flagship Confiance and killed instantly; the gun having been struck on its muzzle by a cannonball from the American flagship USS Saratoga which had sent the piece reeling backwards onto him. One eyewitness later recorded how Downie appeared when the gun, which weighed several tons, was removed:

"His skin was not broken, a black mark about the size of a small plate was the only visible injury. His watch was found flattened, with its hands pointing to the very second at which he received the fatal blow."

The loss of Downie, who was arguably the most experienced officer in the British fleet, greatly increased the odds of the American forces winning the engagement that day.

A 24-pound cannon from the captured Confiance, the same gun responsible for the death of Downie, can be found today on display in front of Macdonough Hall at the United States Naval Academy in Annapolis, Maryland. The deep indentation on the muzzle of this gun left by the ball from the USS Saratoga is still present. The anchor from Downie's Confiance is in the lobby of Plattsburgh City Hall in Plattsburgh, NY.

Downie is buried in the Riverside Cemetery, Plattsburgh.
