= List of ship launches in 1814 =

The list of ship launches in 1814 includes a chronological list of some ships launched in 1814.

Date	Ship	Class	Builder	Location	Country	Notes
6 January	James Harris	West Indiaman	Melling, Watson & Co.	Liverpool	United Kingdom	For private owner.
8 January	Falmouth	Cyrus-class ship-sloop	Richard Chapman	Bideford	United Kingdom	For Royal Navy.
8 January	Spey	Cyrus-class ship-sloop	James Warwick	Eling	United Kingdom	For Royal Navy.
24 January	Lee	Cyrus-class post ship	Josiah and Thomas Brindley	Frindsbury	United Kingdom	For Royal Navy.
29 January	Juliana	Barque	Matthew Smith	Sulkea	India	For private owner.
January	Earl of Fife	Whaler		Sunderland	United Kingdom	For private owner.
7 February	Brunswick	Whaler	Thomas Steemson	Paull	United Kingdom	For James Shrapnell Bowden & Willia Wright.
12 February	Glasgow	Endymion-class frigate	Wigram & Green	Blackwall	United Kingdom	For Royal Navy.
19 February	Prince of Orange	West Indiaman	Thomas Burn	Sunderland	United Kingdom	For private owner.
20 February	The Tyne Steam Boat	Steamboat		River Tyne	United Kingdom	For private owner.
21 February	Liverpool	Endymion-class frigate	Wigram, Wells & Green	Blackwall Yard	United Kingdom	For Royal Navy.
February	Bedford	West Indiaman	Barkworth & Co.	Hessle	United Kingdom	For private owner.
February	Camillus	West Indiaman	Barkworth & Co.	Hessle	United Kingdom	For M. Metcalf & Sons.
8 March	Hind	Cyrus-class post ship	Robert Davy	Topsham	United Kingdom	For Royal Navy.
8 March	Larne	Cyrus-class post ship	William Bottomley	King's Lynn	United Kingdom	For Royal Navy.
10 March	Conway	Conway-class post ship	John Pelham	Frindsbury	United Kingdom	For Royal Navy.
23 March	Tamar	Conway-class post ship	Josiah & Thomas Brindley	Frindsbury	United Kingdom	For Royal Navy.
24 March	Lively	Smack	Birnie	Montrose	United Kingdom	For private owner.
24 March	Marchioness of Queensbury	Packet ship	Wilson	Liverpool	United Kingdom	For private owner.
25 March	Kent	Merchantman	John White	Chittagong	India	For private owner.
March	Eclipse	Merchantman	T. R. Greenwell	Sunderland	United Kingdom	For T. R. Greenwell.
March	Mersey	Conway-class post ship	William Courtney	Chester	United Kingdom	For Royal Navy.
March	Montreal	Full-rigged ship	Gilkieson, Mair & Co.	Irvine	United Kingdom	For private owner.
March	Princess Charlotte	Paddle steamer	James Munn	Greenock	United Kingdom	For private owner.
4 April	Fury	Hecla-class bomb vessel	Mary Ross	Rochester	United Kingdom	For Royal Navy.
5 April	Menai	Conway-class post ship	Josiah Brindley	Frindsbury	United Kingdom	For Royal Navy.
6 April	Alpheus	Scamander-class frigate	William Wallis	Blackwall	United Kingdom	For Royal Navy.
6 April	Tartar	Apollo-class frigate	William Stone	Deptford	United Kingdom	For Royal Navy.
7 April	Jefferson	Brig	Henry Eckford	Sackett's Harbor, New York	United States	For United States Navy.
7 April	Tserber	Lugger	B. F. Stoke	Saint Petersburg	Russia	For Imperial Russian Navy.
10 April	Jones	Brig	Henry Eckford	Sackett's Harbor, New York	United States	For United States Navy.
11 April	Saratoga	Corvette	Adam and Noah Brown	Vergennes, Vermont	United States	For United States Navy.
14 April	Prince Regent	Fourth rate	Kingston Royal Naval Dockyard	Kingston	(United Kingdom of Great Britain and Ireland) Upper Canada	For Royal Navy.
14 April	Princess Charlotte	Fifth rate	Kingston Royal Naval Dockyard	Kingston, Ontario	(United Kingdom of Great Britain and Ireland) Upper Canada	For Royal Navy.
21 April	Name unknown	Brig	Hutchison	Kirkcaldy	United Kingdom	For Robert & William Russell.
22 April	Blucher	Merchantman	John Scott	Sunderland	United Kingdom	For J. Hurry & Co.
25 April	John	Brig	Titterton	Storkwith	United Kingdom	For private owner.
April	Niagara	Brig		Île aux Noix	(United Kingdom of Great Britain and Ireland) Upper Canada	For Royal Navy.
2 May	Superior	Frigate	Henry Eckford	Sackett's Harbor, New York	United States	For United States Navy.
5 May	Dee	Conway-class post ship	Jabez Bayley	Ipswich	United Kingdom	For Royal Navy.
6 May	Towey	Conway-class post ship	Balthazar Adams	Bucklers Hard	United Kingdom	For Royal Navy.
14 May	Trusty	Paddle steamer	Archibald McLauchlin & William Denny	Dumbarton	United Kingdom	For private owner.
19 May	Eden	Conway-class post ship	William Courtney	Chester	United Kingdom	For Royal Navy.
20 May	Tyne	Conway-class post ship	Robert Davy	Topsham	United Kingdom	For Royal Navy.
21 May	Forte	Fifth rate	Edward Sison	Woolwich Dockyard	United Kingdom	For Royal Navy.
May	Enterprise	Sternwheeler	Daniel French	Brownsville, Pennsylvania	United States	For Monongahela and Ohio Steam Boat Company.
May	Henry	Brig		Sunderland	United Kingdom	For private owner.
May	Industry	Paddle steamer	Fyffe	Fairlie	United Kingdom	For Mr. Cochrane.
May	Jessy	Brig	Hustwick	River Spey	United Kingdom	For private owner.
3 June	Blucher	Merchantman		Portobello	United Kingdom	For private owner.
4 June	Cyrene	Cyrus-class post ship	Richard Chapman	Bideford	United Kingdom	For Royal Navy.
8 June	Bann	Sixth rate	John King	Upnor	United Kingdom	For Royal Navy.
11 June	Mohawk	Frigate	Henry Eckford	Sackett's Harbor, New York	United States	For United States Navy.
18 June	Belette	Cruizer-class brig-sloop	Edward Larking & William Sprong	King's Lynn	United Kingdom	For Royal Navy.
20 June	Guerriere	Frigate	Francis & Joseph Grice	Philadelphia Navy Yard	United States	For United States Navy.
21 June	Salisbury	Salisbury-class ship of the line	William Stone	Deptford Dockyard	United Kingdom	For Royal Navy.
22 June	Independence	Third rate	Josiah Barker	Boston Navy Yard	United States	For United States Navy.
23 June	Rossiya	Rossiya-class frigate	A. K. Kaverznev	Saint Petersburg	Russia	For Imperial Russian Navy.
27 June	Mary	Brig	Hustwick	River Spey	United Kingdom	For private owner.
June	Argyll	Paddle steamer		River Clyde	United Kingdom	For private owner.
June	Margery	Paddle steamer	Archibald McLachlan	Dumbarton	United Kingdom	For William Anderson, John McCubbin and others.
June	Princess of Orange	Paddle steamer		River Cluyde	United Kingdom	For private owner.
June	Stakesby	Merchantman	W. S. Chapman	Whitby	United Kingdom	For Edward Chapman, W. S. Chapman, and Henry Simpson.
4 July	Nelson	Nelson-class ship of the line	Edward Sison	Woolwich Dockyard	United Kingdom	For Royal Navy.
5 July	Superbe	Téméraire-class ship of the line		Antwerp	France	For French Navy.
11 July	Princess Charlotte	West Indiaman	William Gibson & Son	Hull	United Kingdom	For James Burton.
18 July	Duke of Wellington	West Indiaman	Robert Menzies	Leith	United Kingdom	Built on speculation.
19 July	Brilliant	Full-rigged ship	Alexander Hall & Co.	Aberdeen	United Kingdom	For private owner.
19 July	Hyperion	Merchantman	John & Robert Davison	Sunderland	United Kingdom	For J. Davidson.
20 July	Brilliant	Merchantman	A. Hall & Co.	Aberdeen	United Kingdom	For private owner.
July	Alexander	Full-rigged ship	Gilderdale, Pearson & Co	Thorne	United Kingdom	For private owner.
1 August	Duke of Wellington	West Indiaman	Mark Richards & Co.	Hythe	United Kingdom	For private owner.
1 August	Java	Frigate		Baltimore, Maryland	United States	For United States Navy.
1 August	St Helena	Schooner	Wigram & Green	Blackwall Yard	United Kingdom	For British East India Company.
3 August	Alexander	Full-rigged ship	Bunney & Firbank	Hull	United Kingdom	For private owner.
3 August	Kirkella	Full-rigged ship	Barnes, Dikes, and King	Hull	United Kingdom	For Messrs. Eggington.
5 August	Stentor	Full-rigged ship	James Crown	Monkwearmouth	United Kingdom	For private owner.
6 August	Rochfort	Third rate	Jacobs	Milford Haven	United Kingdom	For Royal Navy.
6 August	Unnamed	Brig		Constantinople	Ottoman Empire	For Ottoman Navy.
6 August	Unnamed	Frigate		Constantinople	Ottoman Empire	For Ottoman Navy.
6 August	Unnamed	Gunboat		Constantinople	Ottoman Empire	For Ottoman Navy.
7 August	Ianus	Vestnik-class cutter	B. F. Stoke	Saint Petersburg	Russia	For Imperial Russian Navy.
7 August	Khameleon	Vestnik-class cutter	B. F. Stoke	Saint Petersburg	Russia	For Imperial Russian Navy.
11 August	Surprise	Brig	Adam and Noah Brown	Vergennes, Vermont	United States	For United States Navy.
17 August	Wye	Sixth rate	Hobbs & Hellyer	Redbridge	United Kingdom	For Royal Navy.
18 August	Icarus	Brig-sloop	Nicholas Diddams	Portsmouth Dockyard	United Kingdom	For Royal Navy.
20 August	Finland	Trekh Sviatitelei-class ship of the line	B. F. Stoke	Saint Petersburg	Russia	For Imperial Russian Navy.
20 August	Piotr	Trekh Sviatitelei-class ship of the line	I. V. Kurepanov	Saint Petersburg	Russia	For Imperial Russian Navy.
25 August	Confiance	Fifth rate	Ile aux Noix	Quebec	(United Kingdom of Great Britain and Ireland) Lower Canada	For Royal Navy.
30 August	Iéna	Commerce de Paris-class ship of the line		Rochefort	France	For French Navy.
August	Prince Blucher	Merchantman		Danzig	Danzig	For private owner.
2 September	Lady Nugent	Merchantman	J. Scott & Co.	Calcutta	India	For private owner.
10 September	St Lawrence	First rate	Kingston Royal Naval Dockyard	Kingston	(United Kingdom of Great Britain and Ireland) Upper Canada	For Royal Navy.
13 September	Duckenfield	West Indiaman	Preston	Great Yarmouth	United Kingdom	For C. Nockels.
14 September	Amstel	Pallas-class frigate		Rotterdam	(France) French First Republic	For Dutch Navy.
14 September	The Aboyne	Merchantman	William Brenner	Aberdeen	United Kingdom	For private owner.
16 September	Wolf	Crocus-class brig-sloop	Edward Sison	Woolwich Dockyard	United Kingdom	For Royal Navy.
1 October	Washington	Independence-class ship of the line	Portsmouth Navy Yard	Portsmouth, New Hampshire	United States	For United States Navy.
27 October	Lord Lyndoch	Merchantman	Matthew Smith	Sulkea	India	For private owner.
29 October	Fulton	Floating battery	Adam and Noah Brown	New York	United States	For United States Navy.
29 October	Layton	West Indiaman	Brocklebank	Lancaster	United Kingdom	For private owner.
29 October	Magnifique	Bucentaure-class ship of the line		Lorient	France	For French Navy.
29 October	Orient	Merchantman	Matthew Smith	Calcutta	India	For private owner.
29 October	Victor	Sloop-of-war	Jamsetjee Bomanjee Wadia	Bombay	India	For Royal Navy.
31 October	Lord Hungerford	Merchantman	R. Kyd & W. Richardson	Kidderpore	India	For private owner.
12 November	Albion	Merchantman	J. Scott & Co.	Calcutta	India	For J. Hunter.
13 November	Gannet	Sloop	Edward Larking	King's Lynn	United Kingdom	For Royal Navy.
22 November	Busiris	West Indiaman	William Smith & Co.	Newcastle upon Tyne	United Kingdom	For private owner.
22 November	Parizh	Poltava-class ship of the line	M. K. Surovtsov	Kherson	Russia	For Imperial Russian Navy.
6 December	Potton	Merchantman	Barkworth & Hawkes	Hessle	United Kingdom	For John Barkworth.
15 December	Chippewa	Chippewa-class ship of the line	Adam Brown	Sacketts Harbor, New York	United States	For United States Navy.
25 December	Psyche	Fourth rate	Kingston Royal Naval Dockyard	Kingston	(United Kingdom of Great Britain and Ireland) Upper Canada	For Royal Navy.
27 December	Esther	Brig	W. and M. Moody	Gainsborough	United Kingdom	For private owner.
27 December	Hercules	Merchantman	Gilmore & Co.	Calcutta	India	For private owner.
28 December	Brilliant	Apollo-class frigate		Deptford Dockyard	United Kingdom	For Royal Navy.
Unknown date	Aboyne	Merchantman		Sunderland	United Kingdom	For private owner.
Unknown date	Allen	Row galley	Adam and Noah Brown	Vergennes, Vermont	United States	For United States Navy.
Unknown date	Ariadne	Brig	James Thompson	Sunderland	United Kingdom	For James Thompson.
Unknown date	Batavia	Third rate		Antwerp	France	For Dutch Navy.
Unknown date	Borer	Galley	Noah Brown	Vergennes, Vermont	United States	For United States Navy.
Unknown date	British Tar	Merchantman		Whitby	United Kingdom	For private owner.
Unknown date	Burrows	Full-rigged ship		Vergennes, Vermont	United States	For United States Navy.
Unknown date	Caroline	Frigate		Bombay	India	For Imaum of Muscat.
Unknown date	Centipede	Full-rigged ship			United States	For United States Navy.
Unknown date	Countess of Liverpool	Cutter		Portland	United Kingdom	For Robert Naylor.
Unknown date	Deveron	Snow		Monkwearmouth	United Kingdom	For Mr. Wilson.
Unknown date	Diligence	Storeship	Jabez Bayley	Ipswich	United Kingdom	For Royal Navy.
Unknown date	Duke of Wellington	Merchantman	John & Philip Laing	Sunderland	United Kingdom	For Park & Co.
Unknown date	Earl of Buckinghamshire	Merchantman	D. Munn	Montreal	(United Kingdom of Great Britain and Ireland) Lower Canada	For private owner.
Unknown date	Eendracht	Sixth rate			Netherlands	For Dutch Navy.
Unknown date	Emperor Alexander	Merchantman		Sunderland	United Kingdom	For private owner.
Unknown date	Firefly	Ful-rigged ship			United States	For United States Navy.
Unknown date	Flambeau	Full-rigged ship			United States	For United States Navy.
Unknown date	Flora	Brig		Bombay	India	For Bombay Pilot Service.
Unknown date	Frederica Sophia Wilhelmina	Pallas-class frigate			Netherlands	For Dutch Navy.
Unknown date	Glaphyra	Barque		Calcutta	India	For private owner.
Unknown date	Grampian	Brig		Monkwearmouth	United Kingdom	For private owner.
Unknown date	Guide	Brig		Bombay	India	For Bombay Pilot Service.
Unknown date	Hadlow	Full-rigged ship	J. Munn	Quebec	(United Kingdom of Great Britain and Ireland) Lower Canada	For W. Parker & Co.
Unknown date	Halifax Packet	Merchantman	John & Philip Laing	Sunderland	United Kingdom	For Mr. Sanderson.
Unknown date	Hebe	Merchantman	John & Philip Laing	Sunderland	United Kingdom	For Mr. Saunders.
Unknown date	Hilton	Brig	John M. & William Gales	Sunderland	United Kingdom	For J. H. Henzell.
Unknown date	John Barry	Merchantman	John Barry	Whitby	United Kingdom	For John Barry.
Unknown date	John Palmer	Schooner	J. & W. Jenkins	Cockle Bay	(United Kingdom of Great Britain and Ireland) New South Wales	For D. H. Smith.
Unknown date	Kent	Merchantman	John & Philip Laing	Sunderland	United Kingdom	For private owner.
Unknown date	Layton	Merchantman	John Brockbank	Lancaster	United Kingdom	For private owner.
Unknown date	Leda	Brig	John M. & William Gales	Sunderland	United Kingdom	For W. Alexander.
Unknown date	London	Brig		Hylton (Note: The source says only "unknown Hylton builder", so this may be either North Hylton or South Hylton—there were shipbuilders on both banks.)	United Kingdom	For private owner.
Unknown date	Lynx	Baltimore Clipper	James Owner	Georgetown, Maryland	United States	For United States Navy.
Unknown date	Nettle	Full-rigged ship		Vergennes, Vermont	United States	For United States Navy.
Unknown date	New Carmo	Merchantman	M. Smith	Calcutta	India	For private owner.
Unknown date	Norfolk	West Indiaman		Littlehampton	United Kingdom	For Corney & Co.
Unknown date	Oscar	Merchantman		Sunderland	United Kingdom	For Booth & Co.
Unknown date	Ottawa	Merchantman		New Liverpool, Quebec	(United Kingdom of Great Britain and Ireland) Upper Canada	For private owner.
Unknown date	Palladium	Brig		Sunderland	United Kingdom	For private owner.
Unknown date	Peace	Brig	John M. & William Gales	Sunderland	United Kingdom	For John White.
Unknown date	Polly	Brig	John & Philip Laing	Sunderland	United Kingdom	For W. Wheatley.
Unknown date	Princess Charlotte	West Indiaman		Bristol	United Kingdom	For G. Hillhouse, Sons & Co.
Unknown date	Princess Charlotte	West Indiaman	R. & J. Bulmer	South Shields	United Kingdom	For Mr. Bulmer.
Unknown date	Ranger	Full-rigged ship			United States	For United States Navy.
Unknown date	Regret	Merchantman	T. Barrick	Whitby	United Kingdom	For George Barrick Jr., Henry Barrick and John Watson.
Unknown date	Releif	Merchantman	J. Booth	Sunderland	United Kingdom	For private owner.
Unknown date	Richard	Merchantman	John Brockbank	Lancaster	United Kingdom	For private owner.
Unknown date	Robert Quayle	Snow		Liverpool	United Kingdom	For Mr. Davidson.
Unknown date	Royalist	Merchantman		Sunderland	United Kingdom	For private owner.
Unknown date	Sarah	Snow		Sunderland	United Kingdom	For private owner.
Unknown date	Seneca	Merchantman	John & Philip Laing	Sunderland	United Kingdom	For private owner.
Unknown date	Sophia	Brig		Bombay	India	For Bombay Pilot Service.
Unknown date	Spion	Full-rigged ship			France	For Dutch Navy.
Unknown date	Superior	Smack	Richard Bussell	Lyme Regis	United Kingdom	For private owner.
Unknown date	Thames	Ketch		Bombay	India	For British East India Company.
Unknown date	Thames	Brig	John M. & William Gales	Sunderland	United Kingdom	For Andrew & John White.
Unknown date	Ticonderoga	Steamboat		Vergennes, Vermont	United States	For private owner.
Unknown date	Timandra	Merchantman	Robert Gibbons & others	Aberdeen	United Kingdom	For W. Gibbon.
Unknown date	Van der Werff	Fourth rate		Rotterdam	Netherlands	For Dutch Navy.
Unknown date	Viper	Row galley		Vergennes, Vermont	United States	For United States Navy.
Unknown date	Wilhelmina	Pallas-class frigate		Dunkerque	France	For Dutch Navy.
Unknown date	Name unknown	Merchantman		New York	United States	For private owner.
Unknown date	Name unknown	Smack			United Kingdom	For private owner.
