= List of shipwrecks in June 1872 =

The list of shipwrecks in June 1872 includes ships sunk, foundered, grounded, or otherwise lost during June 1872.

== 1 June ==
List of shipwrecks: 1 June 1872
Ship	State	Description
Jeanette Marianne	Netherlands	The ship departed from Lagos, Africa for Queenstown, County Cork, United Kingdom. No further trace, presumed foundered with the loss of all hands.
Little Hirondelle	United Kingdom	The yacht was run down and sunk off Folkestone, Kent by the collier Surprise (United Kingdom). All three people on board were rescued by Surprise.

== 2 June ==
List of shipwrecks: 2 June 1872
Ship	State	Description
Isa	United Kingdom	The steamship departed from Galle, Ceylon for Cardiff, Glamorgan. No further trace, presumed foundered with the loss of all hands.
Lady Duff	United Kingdom	The schooner ran aground on the Abertay Sands, off the mouth of the River Tay and was wrecked. Her crew were rescued by the tug Sensation (United Kingdom). Lady Duff was on a voyage from Sunderland, County Durham to Dundee, Forfarshire.

== 3 June ==
List of shipwrecks: 3 June 1872
Ship	State	Description
Inflexible	France	The schooner collided with Glenhuntly (United Kingdom) and foundered in the English Channel off The Lizard, Cornwall, United Kingdom.

== 4 June ==
List of shipwrecks: 4 June 1872
Ship	State	Description
Carrie Fischer	United Kingdom	The schooner was wrecked at Cow Head, Newfoundland Colony.

== 6 June ==
List of shipwrecks: 6 June 1872
Ship	State	Description
Tees	United Kingdom	The hulk, a former Conway-class post ship used as a floating church, sank at Liverpool, Lancashire.
Unnamed	United Kingdom	The schooner ran aground on the Brazil Bank, in the Irish Sea off the coast of Lancashir. She was refloated.

== 7 June ==
List of shipwrecks: 7 June 1872
Ship	State	Description
Ems, and Schwan	Germany	The steamship Ems collided with Schwan in the Weser and sank. Her crew were rescued. She was on a voyage from Antwerp, Belgium to Bremen. Schwan put back to Bremen in a leaky condition.
Georgiana	United Kingdom	The schooner was run into by the steamship Rotterdam (Netherlands) in the Belfast Lough. Rotterdam towed her in to Belfast, County Antrim, where she sank. She was refloated on 13 June.
Margaret	United Kingdom	The schooner ran aground on the Elbow End Bank, off the mouth of the River Tay. She was on a voyage from Sunderland, County Durham to Dundee, Forfarshire. She was refloated but consequently had to be beached at Buddon Ness. She was refloated and towed in to Dundee in a severely leaky condition.
Unnamed	France	The schooner was driven ashore in the Scheldt at Doel, East Flanders, Belgium.

== 8 June ==
List of shipwrecks: 8 June 1872
Ship	State	Description
Unnamed	Greece	The ship was run down and sunk off Cape Maleas by the steamship Mid-Surry (United Kingdom). Her crew were rescued by Mid-Surry.

== 9 June ==
List of shipwrecks: 9 June 1872
Ship	State	Description
John Phillips	United Kingdom	The ship foundered off the Isles of Scilly. Her crew were rescued by Acorn (). John Phillips was on a voyage from Ardrossan, Ayrshire to Demerara, British Guiana.

== 11 June ==
List of shipwrecks: 11 June 1872
Ship	State	Description
St. François	France	The ship ran aground off "Solis", Uruguay and was wrecked. Her crew survived. She was on a voyage from Havre de Grâce, Seine-Inférieure to Montevideo, Uruguay.

== 13 June ==
List of shipwrecks: 13 June 1872
Ship	State	Description
Emma Annie	United Kingdom	The schooner struck a rock off the North Bishops and sank. Her crew were rescued by Nora Cain (United Kingdom). Emma Annie was on a voyage from Caernarfon to London.

== 14 June ==
List of shipwrecks: 14 June 1872
Ship	State	Description
Amity	United Kingdom	The smack was wrecked in the River Dovey. Both crew were rescued by the Aberdovey Lifeboat Royal Berkshire ( Royal National Lifeboat Institution).
Eliza O'Keefe	United Kingdom	The ship ran aground on the Goodwin Sands, Kent. She was on a voyage from Seville, Spain to Antwerp, Belgium. She was refloated and resumed her voyage.
France	France	The steamship ran aground in the Saint Lawrence River and had to be beached. She was on a voyage from Montreal to Quebec City, Canada.
Rose and Mary	United Kingdom	The brig was run down and sunk in Lough Foyle by the steamship Prussian (United Kingdom). Her crew were rescued. Rose and Mary was on a voyage from Troon, Ayrshire to Londonderry.

== 15 June ==
List of shipwrecks: 15 June 1872
Ship	State	Description
Cromwell	United Kingdom	The barque sprang a leak and sank off Cape Finisterre, Spain. Her crew were rescued. She was on a voyage from Almería, Spain to Newcastle upon Tyne, Northumberland.
Clarence	New South Wales	The steamship was driven ashore between Bald Hill and Port Macquarie. She was on a voyage from Sydney to Port Macquiarie.
Leo	United Kingdom	The brig was driven ashore. She was refloated and put back to Sunderland, County Durham.

== 16 June ==
List of shipwrecks: 16 June 1872
Ship	State	Description
Guadiara	Spain	The steamship suffered a boiler explosion and sank at Marseille, Bouches-du-Rhône, France with the loss of 56 of the 85 people on board.
Nevada	United Kingdom	The steamship ran aground in Roche's Bay. Her passengers were taken off. She was on a voyage from New York, United States to Liverpool, Lancashire. She was refloated and resumed her voyage.
Tuskar	United Kingdom	The steamship ran ashore on Stroma, Caithness. She was on a voyage from Dundee, Forfarshire to Liverpool. She was refloated the next day and resumed her voyage.

== 17 June ==
List of shipwrecks: 17 June 1872
Ship	State	Description
City of Paris	United Kingdom	The steamship was wrecked at Ouistreham, Calvados, France.
Clara	Sweden	The brig collided with the brig Christien (Denmark) and was abandoned in the Irish Sea 25 nautical miles (46 km) west of Holyhead, Anglesey, United Kingdom. Her crew were rescued. Clara was on a voyage from Liverpool, Lancashire, United Kingdom to Riga, Russia.
Prince Alfred	United Kingdom	The brig was driven ashore on Spike Island, County Cork. She was refloated.
Wild Wave	United Kingdom	The brigantine struck rocks and was run ashore at Sandyland, County Down. She was on a voyage from Liverpool to Newcastle upon Tyne, Northumberland. She was refloated and towed in to Belfast, County Antrim in a severely leaky condition.

== 18 June ==
List of shipwrecks: 18 June 1872
Ship	State	Description
Conflict	United Kingdom	The ship caught fire at sea. She was on a voyage from Calcutta, India to Dundee, Forfarshire. She arrived at Dundee on 27 June in a severely damaged condition.

== 19 June ==
List of shipwrecks: 19 June 1872
Ship	State	Description
Kate	New Zealand	The 27-ton schooner went onshore and was wrecked south of the mouth of the Whanganui River. All hands survived.
Kingaloch	United Kingdom	The ship struck the Shagstone, off the coast of Devon and sank.
Unnamed	United Kingdom	The scow was run down and sunk in the Clyde at Bowling, Dunbartonshire by the steamship Eddystone (United Kingdom). Her crew survived.

== 20 June ==
List of shipwrecks: 20 June 1872
Ship	State	Description
Tweedsdale	United Kingdom	The ship was abandoned in the Atlantic Ocean. Her crew were rescued by Pequot (France). Tweedsdale was on a voyage from Quebec City, Canada to Liverpool, Lancashire. She was subsequently set afire.

== 21 June ==
List of shipwrecks: 21 June 1872
Ship	State	Description
Aldate	Portugal	The schooner sank. Her crew were rescued by Battasara (United Kingdom).
Justicia	Germany	The galiot ran aground on the Cork Sand, in the North Sea off the coast of Essex, United Kingdom. She was on a voyage from Pärnu, Russia to Porto, Portugal. She was refloated and assisted in to Harwich, Essex.
Koln	Germany	The ship ran aground. She was on a voyage from Baltimore, Maryland, United States to Bremen. She was refloated and resumed her voyage.
Lealdade	Spain	The ship foundered in the Atlantic Ocean. Her crew were rescued. She was on a voyage from Cardiff, Glamorgan, United Kingdom to the Cape Verde Islands.
Princess Royal	(Dominion of Newfoundland) Newfoundland Colony	The schooner was wrecked on the coast of Labrador. She was on a voyage from Big Harbour, Nova Scotia, Canada to Harbour Grace.
Rainton	United Kingdom	The steamship was driven ashore at Büyükdere, Ottoman Empire.

== 22 June ==
List of shipwrecks: 22 June 1872
Ship	State	Description
Andes	United Kingdom	The steamship collided with the steamship Perière (France) and was beached in the Clyde.
Unnamed	United Kingdom	The brigantine was run into by a steam yacht and sank in the River Thames at Erith, Kent. Her crew were rescued.

== 23 June ==
List of shipwrecks: 23 June 1872
Ship	State	Description
Gibraltar	United Kingdom	The steamship ran aground and sank at Lisbon, Portugal. Her crew were rescued. She was on a voyage from Cádiz, Spain to London.
Glance	United Kingdom	The yacht foundered off the mouth of the Humber. Both crew were rescued by the schooner Ebony (United Kingdom). Glance was on a voyage from Inverness to Wivenhoe, Essex.

== 24 June ==
List of shipwrecks: 24 June 1872
Ship	State	Description
Adalia	United Kingdom	The steamship ran aground on St. Paul Island, Nova Scotia, Canada and was wrecked. She was on a voyage from London to Quebec City Canada.
Balmacarra	United Kingdom	The barque ran aground off Langeoog, Germany and was wrecked. Her crew were rescued. She was on a voyage from Bahia, Brazil to Bremen, Germany.
Franklin	Germany	The steamship was damaged by fire at New York, United States.
Jesmond	United Kingdom	The steamship collided with the steamship Alicante (Spain) and sank in the Mediterranean Sea 35 nautical miles (65 km) east of Gibraltar. Her crew were rescued by Alicante. Jesmond was on a voyage from Brăila, Ottoman Empire to an English port.
Lamplighter	United Kingdom	The ship sprang a leak and sank at Islandmagee, County Antrim. She was on a voyage from Ayr to Neath, Glamorgan.
Tom Bell	United Kingdom	The steamship ran aground in the Danube.

== 25 June ==
List of shipwrecks: 25 June 1872
Ship	State	Description
Marquis of Lorne	United Kingdom	The steamship was driven ashore at Highbridge, Somerset.

== 26 June ==
List of shipwrecks: 26 June 1872
Ship	State	Description
Germania	United States	The ship ran aground on the Burnanceira Rock, on the coast of Portugal. She was on a voyage from New York to Porto, Portugal. She was refloated on 28 June.
Struggler	New Zealand	The 30-ton ketch stranded at Le Bons Bay, Banks Peninsula in a gale and became a wreck.
Uruguay	United Kingdom	The steamship ran aground on the Goodwin Sands, Kent. She was on a voyage from Odesa, Russia to Hamburg, Germany. She was refloated and resumed her voyage.

== 27 June ==
List of shipwrecks: 27 June 1872
Ship	State	Description
Haidee	(United Kingdom of Great Britain and Ireland) Jamaica	The brigantine was wrecked north of Inagua, Bahamas. Her crew were rescued. She was on a voyage from Wilmington, Delaware to Jamaica.

== 28 June ==
List of shipwrecks: 28 June 1872
Ship	State	Description
Astarte	United Kingdom	The ship caught fire in the South Atlantic and was abandoned by her crew. They were rescued by Baroda (United Kingdom). Astarte was on a voyage from Bombay, India to Liverpool, Lancashire.
Sarah Newman	United Kingdom	The ship was sighted in the Indian Ocean whilst on a voyage from Akyab, Burma to Liverpool. No further trace, presumed foundered with the loss of all hands.

== 29 June ==
List of shipwrecks: 29 June 1872
Ship	State	Description
Erasmo	United Kingdom	The barque was driven ashore between Cape Spartel and Tangier, Morocco. Her crew were rescued. She was on a voyage from Livorno to New York, United States.
Grazietta	Italy	The ship was wrecked at Agrigento, Sicily. She was on a voyage from "Mazzarelli" to Plymouth, Devon, United Kingdom.
Lizzie Webster	United States	The steamship was wrecked on Cozumel, Mexico. All on board survived. The wreck was plundered by the local inhabitants.
Prudhoe Castle	United Kingdom	The steamship ran aground in the Mohnsund. She was on a voyage from Reval to Riga, Russia. She was refloated and resumed her voyage.
Temperley	United Kingdom	The steamship ran aground at Ottawa, Quebec, Canada. She was on a voyage from London to Montreal, Quebec.

== 30 June ==
List of shipwrecks: 30 June 1872
Ship	State	Description
Dauntless	New Zealand	The 72-ton schooner was lost towards the end of the month while en route from Tauranga to Auckland.
Omaha	United Kingdom	The steamship was wrecked in a cyclone at Saugor, India with the loss of seven of her crew.
Orchis	United Kingdom	The steamship was damaged in a cyclone at Calcutta, India.
Pekin	United Kingdom	The steamship was driven ashore in the Hooghly River during a cyclone. She was refloated.
Singapore	United Kingdom	The steamship was driven ashore in a cyclone at Saugor. She was on a voyage from China to Calcutta, India. She was refloated on 6 July and taken in to Calcutta.

== Unknown date ==
List of shipwrecks: Unknown date in June 1872
Ship	State	Description
Adalia	United Kingdom	The steamship was wrecked on St. Paul Island, Nova Scotia, Canada. All on board were rescued. She was on a voyage from Sunderland, County Durham to Montreal, Quebec, Canada.
Alexandria	United States	The schooner was abandoned in the Atlantic Ocean.
Bengal	Flag unknown	The steamship was driven ashore at Aden. She was refloated with assistance from a steamship and resumed her voyage.
Bentinck	United Kingdom	The barque was driven ashore and wrecked at Grand-Popo, Dahomey.
California	United Kingdom	The steamship sank in the Strait of Georgia before 22 June. She was on a voyage from San Francisco, California to Sitka, Department of Alaska.
Chester	United Kingdom	The steamship was driven ashore at "Stefano Point". She was refloated.
Corning	United Kingdom	The ship was abandoned at sea. She was on a voyage from South Shields, County Durham to Bombay, India.
Cremona	United Kingdom	The ship ran aground in the Dry Tortugas before 4 June. she was on a voyage from Galveston, Texas, United States to Liverpool, Lancashire. She was refloated.
Dhollerah	United Kingdom	The ship was destroyed by fire at sea before 11 June. All on board were rescued by Perle (Flag unknown). Dhollerah was on a voyage from London to Adelaide, South Australia.
Dorchester	United States	The ship was driven ashore at Wellfleet, Massachusetts. She was on a voyage from "Trepansto" to Boston, Massachusetts.
Eliza and Mary	United Kingdom	The steamship ran aground in the River Parrett. She was on a voyage from Highbridge, Somerset to Cardiff, Glamorgan. She was refloated and placed under repair.
Emigrant	United Kingdom	The ship was abandoned at sea. She was on a voyage from Quebec City, Canada to Greenock, Renfrewshire. She was towed in to Charlottetown, Prince Edward Island, Canada.
Excelsior	United Kingdom	The barque ran aground on the Mendensand.
Fannie	United States	Ten Years' War: The steamship was captured and burnt in Cuba with about half of the 56 filibusters killed or take prisoner. Her cargo of war materials was seized.
Florence	United Kingdom	The ship was wrecked on Key Verde.
Gape	Canada	The ship was driven ashore and wrecked on Miquelon. She was on a voyage from Pictou, Nova Scotia to Saint John, New Brunswick.
George R. Upton	United States	The ship was wrecked near Norfolk, Virginia.
Gertrude	Norway	The ship was driven ashore at Kaskinen, Grand Duchy of Finland.
Gibraltar	United Kingdom	The steamship was wrecked at Lisbon, Portugal before 27 June. She was on a voyage from Málaga, Spain to London.
Gioga	Germany	The ship sank. She was on a voyage from Callao, Peru to Hamburg.
Golden Hind	United States	The ship was wrecked on Charles Island, Galapagos Islands with the loss of thirteen of her 21 crew. Survivors were later rescued by the schooner Eagle ( (United Kingdom of Great Britain and Ireland) Falkland Islands).
Harriet Irving	United States	The ship was wrecked at Laguna de los Padres, Argentina with the loss of two of her crew. She was on a voyage from Boston, Massachusetts to Valparaíso, Chile.
Harvest Queen	United States	The ship ran aground at Goiânia, Brazil. She was refloated and resumed her voyage.
Hibernia	United Kingdom	The ship ran aground at "Lake St. Peter". She was on a voyage from Liverpool to Halifax, Nova Scotia.
Idaho	United Kingdom	The steamship ran aground at Victoria, British Columbia, Canada before 22 June. She was refloated.
John Barden	United Kingdom	The barque was driven ashore and wrecked at "Jellah Coffee", Dahomey.
John Millar	United Kingdom	The ship was abandoned in the Atlantic Ocean before 11 June.
John Mitchell	United Kingdom	The ship was abandoned in the Atlantic Ocean before 9 June.
Karen	United Kingdom	The ship was driven ashore at Point Pleasant, New Jersey, United States. She was on a voyage from Liverpool to Halifax.
Killara	United Kingdom	The steamship was driven ashore on the South Wall. She was on a voyage from Amsterdam, North Holland, Netherlands to Goole, Yorkshire.
Mary	United Kingdom	The steamship was driven ashore at "Stefano Point". She was refloated.
Mayflower	United Kingdom	The skiff foundered between Rùm and Coll. She was on a voyage from Loch Boisdale to the Crinan Canal.
Mizpah	United Kingdom	The steamship was driven ashore at Blakeney, Norfolk. She was on a voyage from Sunderland to Malta. She was refloated and resumed her voyage.
Need	United Kingdom	The smack was driven ashore at Fowey, Cornwall.
Nicholas Etienne Jeune	France	The ship was lost near Lagos.
Otter	United Kingdom	The steamship ran aground on the Huckerplatt, off the coast of Zeeland, Netherlands. She was refloated and resumed her voyage.
Recordate	Austria-Hungary	The steamship ran aground at Yeisk, Russia and was abandoned by her crew.
Saxonia	Germany	The ship ran aground off Schulan. She was on a voyage from New Orleans, Louisiana, United States to Hamburg. She was refloated and completed her voyage.
Schiedam	United Kingdom	The brig ran aground on the Pagensand, in the North Sea and sank.
St. Andrews	United Kingdom	The ship was driven ashore on Hare Island. She was on a voyage from Newport, Monmouthshire to Quebec City. She was refloated and resumed her voyage.
St. Paul	France	The ship was lost near Lagos.
Tunsin	China	The steamship was driven ashore in the Yangtze. She was refloated and taken in to Shanghai.
Twee Gebroders	Germany	The ship was abandoned in the North Sea off Heligoland. Her five crew were rescued by the steamship Minerva (United Kingdom).
Valparaiso	United Kingdom	The ship caught fire at Rangoon, Burma and was scuttled. She was refloated.
W. Mosher	Canada	The ship was damaged by fire at Quebec City.
