= Timandra =

Timandra may refer to:

- Timandra (mythology), half-sister of Helen of Troy
- Timandra (moth), a genus of moth in the family Geometridae
- Croton (plant) (syn. Timandra), a genus of spurge in the family Euphorbiaceae
- 603 Timandra, an asteroid
- Timandra (ship), several ships
- Timandra (mother of Neophron), lover of Aegypius in Greek mythology
- Timandra (fl. 5th century BC), mistress of Alcibiades at the time of his assassination
