= List of shipwrecks in August 1825 =

The list of shipwrecks in August 1825 includes some ships sunk, wrecked or otherwise lost during August 1825.

== 3 August ==
List of shipwrecks: 3 August 1825
Ship	State	Description
Traveller	United States	The ship was abandoned in the Atlantic Ocean with the loss of two of her crew. She was on a voyage from Alexandria, Virginia, to Barbados.

== 4 August ==
List of shipwrecks: 4 August 1825
Ship	State	Description
John and Mary	United Kingdom	The brig was driven ashore in Barnstaple Bay. Her crew were rescued. She was wrecked a few days later.
Speedwell	United Kingdom	The ship was driven ashore at Langney Point, Sussex and was wrecked over the next few days.

== 5 August ==
List of shipwrecks: 5 August 1825
Ship	State	Description
Elizabeth	United Kingdom	The ship was driven ashore and wrecked on Terschelling, Friesland, Netherlands. She was on a voyage from Matanzas, Cuba to Hamburg.
North Star	United Kingdom	The ship ran aground on the Middle Bank, in the Irish Sea off the coast of Cumberland, and was abandoned by her crew. She was on a voyage from Miramichi, New Brunswick, British North America to Bo'ness, Fife. North Star subsequently floated off and was driven ashore at Beckfoot, Cumberland, where she was wrecked.

== 6 August ==
List of shipwrecks: 6 August 1825
Ship	State	Description
John	United Kingdom	The ship was wrecked in the Magdalen Islands, Quebec City, Lower Canada, British North America. She was on a voyage from Miramichi, New Brunswick, British North America to London.
North Star	United Kingdom	The ship ran aground on the Middle Bank, in the Irish Sea and was abandoned by her crew. She later floated off and came ashore at Beckfoot, Cumberland, where she was wrecked. North Star was on a voyage from Miramichi to Bo'ness, Lothian.

== 7 August ==
List of shipwrecks: 7 August 1825
Ship	State	Description
Adams	United States	The ship was abandoned in the Atlantic Ocean. She was on a voyage from Alexandria, Virginia, to Gibraltar.
Canada	United Kingdom	The full-rigged ship was destroyed by fire at Miramichi, New Brunswick.
Concord	United Kingdom	The full-rigged ship was destroyed by fire at Miramichi.
Jane	United Kingdom	The brig was destroyed by fire at Miramichi.

== 10 August ==
List of shipwrecks: 10 August 1825
Ship	State	Description
Lavinia	United Kingdom	The ship was wrecked 3 leagues (9 nautical miles (17 km) north of Cape St. Vincent, Portugal. She was on a voyage from Sicily to Falmouth, Cornwall.
Ocean	United Kingdom	The ship was destroyed by fire at Faro, Portugal.
Rambler	United Kingdom	The whaler was wrecked on the coast of Madagascar. She was on a voyage from London to the South Seas.

== 11 August ==
List of shipwrecks: 11 August 1825
Ship	State	Description
Gipsey	United States	The ship sprang a leak and was abandoned in the Atlantic Ocean. She was on a voyage from Hartford, Connecticut, to Barbados.

== 12 August ==
List of shipwrecks: 12 August 1825
Ship	State	Description
Friendship	United Kingdom	The ship was run down and sunk in the English Channel off Hythe, Kent by Stakesby (United Kingdom). Her crew were rescued. She was on a voyage from South Shields, County Durham to Jersey, Channel Islands.
Penguin	(United Kingdom of Great Britain and Ireland) New South Wales	The schooner was wrecked at Half Moon Beach.

== 13 August ==
List of shipwrecks: 13 August 1825
Ship	State	Description
Ann	United Kingdom	The ship struck the Woolseners, in The Solent and sank. Her crew were rescued. She was on a voyage from Sunderland, County Durham to Portsmouth, Hampshire.
John	United Kingdom	The ship was wrecked on the Goodwin Sands, Kent. Her crew were rescued. She was on a voyage from Jamaica to London.
Nancy	United Kingdom	The ship foundered in the Atlantic Ocean with the loss of a crew member. She was on a voyage from Antigua to Liverpool, Lancashire.

== 14 August ==
List of shipwrecks: 14 August 1825
Ship	State	Description
Eliza & Jane	United Kingdom	The ship departed from Penzance, Cornwall for Newport, Monmouthshire. No further trace, presumed foundered with the loss of all hands.
Nancy	United Kingdom	The ship was abandoned in the Atlantic Ocean. Her crew were rescued by Wellington (United Kingdom). Nancy was on a voyage from Antigua to Liverpool, Lancashire.
Otter	United Kingdom	The ship was wrecked near Southport, Lancashire. Her crew were rescued. She was on a voyage from Liverpool to Africa.
Theodosia	United Kingdom	The ship was wrecked on the Coromandel Coast. Her crew were rescued. She was on a voyage from Bengal, India to London.

== 15 August ==
List of shipwrecks: 15 August 1825
Ship	State	Description
Gipsey	United Kingdom	The schooner was wrecked on the West Hoyle Bank, in Liverpool Bay with the loss of all ten people on board. She was on a voyage from Warrenpoint, county Down to Chester, Cheshire.

== 16 August ==
List of shipwrecks: 16 August 1825
Ship	State	Description
Fraternity	Norway	The brig was driven ashore on Neuwark and was abandoned by her crew. She was subsequently taken in to Cuxhaven in a waterlogged condition.

== 17 August ==
List of shipwrecks: 17 August 1825
Ship	State	Description
Britannia	United Kingdom	The ship ran around and sank on the Swine Bottoms, in the Baltic Sea off the coast of Denmark. Her crew were rescued. Shew as on a voyage from London to Saint Petersburg, Russia.
Commerce	United Kingdom	The sloop capsized, was driven ashore, and was wrecked at the mouth of the River Ribble. She was on a voyage from London to Preston, Lancashire. Repaired in situ and refloated on 24 September, Commerce was taken in to Lytham St. Annes, Lancashire.
Five Sodskende	Prussia	The ship driven ashore and wrecked on Wittow. She was on a voyage from Livorno, Grand Duchy of Tuscany to Königsburg.

== 18 August ==
List of shipwrecks: 18 August 1825
Ship	State	Description
Catharina Elizabeth	Netherlands	The ship was lost off Ameland, Friesland. Her crew were rescued. She was on a voyage from Riga, Russia to Amsterdam, North Holland.
Charles Miller	Sweden	The ship departed from Havre de Grâce, Seine-Inférieure, France for Gothenburg. No further trace found, and it was presumed foundered with the loss of all hands.

== 19 August ==
List of shipwrecks: 19 August 1825
Ship	State	Description
Fury	United Kingdom New South Wales	The ship was wrecked in Prince Rupert's Inlet.

== 21 August ==
List of shipwrecks: 21 August 1825
Ship	State	Description
Columbus	Netherlands	The ship departed from Havana, Cuba for Amsterdam, North Holland. No further trace, presumed foundered with the loss of all hands.
Jenny	United Kingdom	The ship was destroyed by fire in the Irish Sea. All on board survived. She was on a voyage from Whitehaven, Cumberland to Saint John, New Brunswick, British North America.
Kent	United Kingdom	The ship ran aground on the North Bank, in Liverpool Bay and was damaged. She was on a voyage from Liverpool, Lancashire to Africa. Kent was refloated and put back to Liverpool for repairs.

== 22 August ==
List of shipwrecks: 22 August 1825
Ship	State	Description
Thompsons	United Kingdom	The ship was driven ashore near the mouth of the Daugava, Russia. She was refloated on 20 October.
Three Brothers	(United Kingdom of Great Britain and Ireland) Bahama	The ship capsized whilst on a voyage from Virginia, United States to Nevis.

== 25 August ==
List of shipwrecks: 25 August 1825
Ship	State	Description
HMS Fury	Royal Navy	The Hecla-class bomb vessel was damaged by ice in Prince Regent Inlet and was abandoned by her 67 crew.

== 26 August ==
List of shipwrecks: 26 August 1825
Ship	State	Description
Jane & Barbara	United Kingdom	The ship was driven ashore and wrecked near Arkhangelsk, Russia.
Leeds	United Kingdom	The ship was driven ashore on the south coast of Kotlin Island, Russia.

== 27 August ==
List of shipwrecks: 27 August 1825
Ship	State	Description
Almira	United States	The ship was wrecked on Bermuda. Her crew were rescued.

== 28 August ==
List of shipwrecks: 28 August 1825
Ship	State	Description
Hercules	United Kingdom	The ship was wrecked on a reef off Domesnes, Norway. Her crew survived. She was on a voyage from London to Riga, Russia.
John Oldin	United Kingdom	The ship was wrecked on Heneaga, Bahamas. Her crew were rescued. She was on a voyage from Genoa, Kingdom of Sardinia to Alvarado, Veracruz, Mexico.

== 29 August ==
List of shipwrecks: 29 August 1825
Ship	State	Description
Gazelle	United Kingdom	The ship capsized in a hurricane. She was on a voyage from Tobago to Saint John, New Brunswick, British North America.
Martha	United Kingdom	The ship ran aground on the Skitter Sand and capsized. She was on a voyage from Saint Petersburg, Russia to Hull, Yorkshire. Martha was refloated and taken in to Hull.

== 30 August ==
List of shipwrecks: 30 August 1825
Ship	State	Description
Nassau	United Kingdom	The ship was beached on Tristan da Cunha, where she was wrecked the next day. All on board survived. the East Indiaman Fairlie (United Kingdom) rescued thirteen survivors on 3 December. Nassau was on a voyage from Sydney, New South Wales to London.

== 31 August ==
List of shipwrecks: 31 August 1825
Ship	State	Description
Gainsborough or Guysborough	United Kingdom	The ship was abandoned in the Atlantic Ocean. Her crew were rescued by Eliza (United Kingdom). Gainsborough was on a voyage from Newfoundland, British North America to Liverpool, Lancashire.
Hydrus	United Kingdom	The country ship was wrecked off Saugur, India. Her crew were rescued.
Nassau	United Kingdom	The ship, which sprang a leak on 14 August, was beached on the south west coast of Tristan da Cunha. All on board survived. She was wrecked the next day. Nassau was on a voyage from Sydney, New South Wales to London.

== Unknown date ==
List of shipwrecks: Unknown date in August 1825
Ship	State	Description
Alexander	Netherlands	The ship was lost near Ventava, Courland Governorate. She was on a voyage from Amsterdam, North Holland to Riga, Russia.
Boston Packet	United States	The ship was abandoned in the Atlantic Ocean on or before 18 August.
John	United Kingdom	The brig was wrecked on the Goodwin Sands, Kent. She was on a voyage from Jamaica to London.
John	United Kingdom	The ship was wrecked in the Magdalen Islands, Lower Canada, British North America. She was on a voyage from Saint John, New Brunswick, British North America to London.
Lady Lumley	(United Kingdom of Great Britain and Ireland) Bermuda	The ship was wrecked in the Magdalen Islands.
Mary	United Kingdom	The sloop foundered in the Irish Sea with the loss of all on board.
Palambam	United Kingdom	The ship was driven ashore at Blyth, Northumberland. She was on a voyage from Quebec City, Lower Canada, British North America to London. Palambam was refloated on 12 August.
Robert	United Kingdom	The brig was driven ashore on the North Triangles.
