= List of shipwrecks in April 1829 =

The list of shipwrecks in April 1829 includes some ships sunk, wrecked or otherwise lost during April 1829.

== 3 April ==
List of shipwrecks: 3 April 1829
Ship	State	Description
Myrtle	United Kingdom	The ship was lost on Ragged Island, Bahamas. Her crew were rescued. She was on a voyage from Bermuda to Halifax, Nova Scotia, British North America.

== 4 April ==
List of shipwrecks: 4 April 1829
Ship	State	Description
Hope	United Kingdom	The ship was wrecked on the Fisherman's Flat, off Calcutta, India. Her crew were rescued.

== 9 April ==
List of shipwrecks: 9 April 1829
Ship	State	Description
Glasgow	United Kingdom	The ship ran aground on the Herd Sand, in the North Sea off Hartlepool, County Durham. She was refloated on 21 April and taken in to Hartlepool in a severely damaged condition.
Grabe	United Kingdom	The ship foundered off Bangor, Caernarfonshire. She was on a voyage from Bangor to Ipswich, Suffolk.
Hawk	United Kingdom	The ship foundered in the North Sea off Berwick upon Tweed, Northumberland with the loss of two lives.

== 10 April ==
List of shipwrecks: 10 April 1829
Ship	State	Description
Jessie	United Kingdom	The ship was wrecked off "Grassholm Island, Jutland. She was on a voyage from Funen, Denmark to London.

== 11 April ==
List of shipwrecks: 11 April 1829
Ship	State	Description
Betsey	United Kingdom	The ship was wrecked on the Newcombe Sand, in the North Sea off the coast of Norfolk.

== 12 April ==
List of shipwrecks: 12 April 1829
Ship	State	Description
Henry & Harriet	United Kingdom	The ship was wrecked at Sumburgh, Shetland Islands with the loss of four of her crew.
Lièole	France	The ship was wrecked south west of the mouth of the Bashee River, Cape Colony with the loss of twelve lives. She was on a voyage from Calcutta, India to Réunion.

== 15 April ==
List of shipwrecks: 15 April 1829
Ship	State	Description
Ayr	United Kingdom	The ship was driven ashore and wrecked in Witsand Bay. Her crew were rescued. She was on a voyage from Newport, Monmouthshire to Penzance, Cornwall.
Letitia Tennant	United Kingdom	The ship was driven ashore and wrecked at St. Mary's, Isles of Scilly. She was on a voyage from Limerick to London.

== 19 April ==
List of shipwrecks: 19 April 1829
Ship	State	Description
Neptune	United Kingdom	The ship was wrecked at the mouth of the Nun River, Nigeria. Her crew were rescued.

== 20 April ==
List of shipwrecks: 20 April 1829
Ship	State	Description
Harper	United Kingdom	The ship was driven ashore and wrecked at Southport, Lancashire. She was on a voyage from Westport, County Mayo to Southport.
Potton	United Kingdom	The ship foundered off Flores Island, Azores. All on board survived. She was on a voyage from Sierra Leone to London.

== 21 April ==
List of shipwrecks: 21 April 1829
Ship	State	Description
Achilles	United Kingdom	The ship struck a rock. She was towed into Loch Tarbert in a sinking state.

== 23 April ==
List of shipwrecks: 23 April 1829
Ship	State	Description
Echo	United Kingdom	The ship was driven ashore and capsized at Bolderāja, Russia.
Marwood	United Kingdom	The ship was driven ashore at Bolderāja.
Providentia	(Denmark) Duchy of Holstein	The ship foundered in the North Sea off the Haisborough Sands. She was on a voyage from Kiel to London, United Kingdom.
Thomas Hodgson	United Kingdom	The ship was driven ashore at Bolderāja.

== 24 April ==
List of shipwrecks: 24 April 1829
Ship	State	Description
James	United Kingdom	The ship was wrecked on the Corton Sand, in the North Sea off the coast of Suffolk. Her crew were rescued. She was on a voyage from Havana, Cuba to London.
John and Mary	United Kingdom	The ship was driven ashore at Eastbourne, Sussex. She was later refloated.
Jolly Sailor	United Kingdom	The ship was driven ashore and wrecked at Eastbourne.
Sir George Osborne	United Kingdom	The whaler ran aground in the Seychelles. She broke up after her crew had abandoned her. Her cargo of 1,000 barrels of whale oil was retrieved.

== 27 April ==
List of shipwrecks: 27 April 1829
Ship	State	Description
Bee	United Kingdom	The ship was wrecked at Sunderland, County Durham.
George & Henry	United Kingdom	The ship was wrecked at Sunderland.
Hope	United Kingdom	The brig foundered in the Bristol Channel off Hartland Point, Devon with the loss of six of her seven crew.
Perdaves	United Kingdom	The ship was driven ashore and wrecked at "Rosecastle".

== 28 April ==
List of shipwrecks: 28 April 1829
Ship	State	Description
Baring	United Kingdom	The ship departed from South Shields, County Durham for Great Yarmouth, Norfolk. No further trace, presumed foundered in the North Sea with the loss of all hands.
Diamond	United Kingdom	The ship was wrecked on the coast of County Limerick with the loss of two lives.
Esther	United Kingdom	The ship sprang a leak and was beached at Robin Hood's Bay, Yorkshire where she was wrecked. Her crew were rescued.
Fame	United Kingdom	The ship was driven ashore and wrecked near Holyhead, Anglesey. Her crew were rescued. She was on a voyage from Palermo, Sicily to Liverpool, Lancashire.
Felicia	United Kingdom	The ship was driven ashore and wrecked near Holyhead. She was on a voyage from Liverpool to "Zelling".
Fowler	United Kingdom	The sloop was driven ashore near Whitby, Yorkshire.
Friends	United Kingdom	The sloop was driven ashore near Whitby.
Harlequin	United Kingdom	The ship was wrecked near Holyhead. Her crew were rescued. She was on a voyage from Pernambuco, Brazil to Liverpool.
Hope	United Kingdom	The ship foundered in the Bristol Channel off Hartland Point, Devon with the loss of all bar her captain. She was on a voyage from London to Bridgwater, Somerset.
Hope	United Kingdom	The ship was wrecked on South Georgia.
Iona or Jona	United Kingdom	The ship struck the Kettlebottom Sand, in the North Sea off Great Yarmouth and foundered. Her crew were rescued.
John	United Kingdom	The ship struck the Barber Sand, in the North Sea off Great Yarmouth and foundered. Her crew were rescued.
Matilda	United Kingdom	The ship was driven ashore and wrecked near Padstow, Cornwall with the loss of three lives. She was on a voyage from Dublin to Shoreham-by-Sea, Sussex.
Portsoy	United Kingdom	The sloop was wrecked at Portsoy, Aberdeenshire. She was on a voyage from Macduff, Aberdeenshire to London.
Superb	United Kingdom	The ship was lost on the Shipwash Sand, in the North Sea off the coast of Essex with the loss of two of her five crew. She was on a voyage from Aberdeen to London. Survivors, and crew members from the smack Paul Pry (United Kingdom), which had gone to her assistance and were stranded on the wreck when their boat was smashed, were rescued by Lively (United Kingdom).

== 29 April ==
List of shipwrecks: 29 April 1829
Ship	State	Description
Alexander	United Kingdom	The ship was driven ashore near Bangor, Caernarfonshire.
HMS Barham	Royal Navy	The third rate ship of the line ran aground off Bonaire and was severely damaged. She was refloated the next day having thrown 37 cannon overboard.
Betsey	United Kingdom	The schooner foundered in the North Sea with the loss of all six crew.
Better Luck Still	United Kingdom	The ship was driven ashore and wrecked at Boulogne, Pas-de-Calais, France. She was on a voyage from London to Shoreham-by-Sea, Sussex.
Brothers	United Kingdom	The ship was wrecked on the Head Sand, in the North Sea. She was on a voyage from Inverness to London.
Buboa	United Kingdom	The ship was wrecked at Fishguard, Pembrokeshire.
Fanny	United Kingdom	The sloop was wrecked off North Somercotes, Lincolnshire with the loss of all seven people on board.
Kate	United Kingdom	The ship was driven ashore at Mockbeggar, Cheshire.
Margaret	United Kingdom	The ship was wrecked near North Sunderland, County Durham. She was on a voyage from Rosehearty, Aberdeenshire to Newcastle upon Tyne, Northumberland.
New Albion	United Kingdom	The ship was wrecked near Scarborough, Yorkshire with the loss of three lives.
Phœnix	United Kingdom	The ship was driven ashore near Boulogne, Pas-de-Calais, France. She was on a voyage from London to Rouen, Seine-Inférieure, France.
Sarah and Eliza	United Kingdom	The ship was driven ashore near Appledore, Devon. She was on a voyage from Gloucester to Sunderland, County Durham.
Star	United Kingdom	The ship was driven ashore at North Somercotes. Her crew were rescued.

== 30 April ==
List of shipwrecks: 30 April 1829
Ship	State	Description
Henry	United Kingdom	The ship foundered off Saint Tudwal's Islands, Caernarfonshire. Her crew were rescued. She was on a voyage from Whitehaven, Cumberland to Cardiff, Glamorgan.
Perseverance	United Kingdom	The ship was wrecked on the Goodwin Sands, Kent with the loss of four of her nine crew. She was on a voyage from Newcastle upon Tyne to Dublin.
Temple	United Kingdom	The ship was lost in the "Camoynas".

== Unknown date ==
List of shipwrecks: Unknown date in April 1829
Ship	State	Description
Cambria	United Kingdom	The collier foundered in the English Channel off Portland, Dorset in early April with some loss of life.
Chieftain	United Kingdom	The ship was driven ashore and severely damaged at Herne Bay, Kent. She was on a voyage from London to Saint Vincent.
Isabella	United Kingdom	The ship was wrecked whilst on a voyage from Alnmouth to London in early April.
