= Signal Station, Moreton Island =

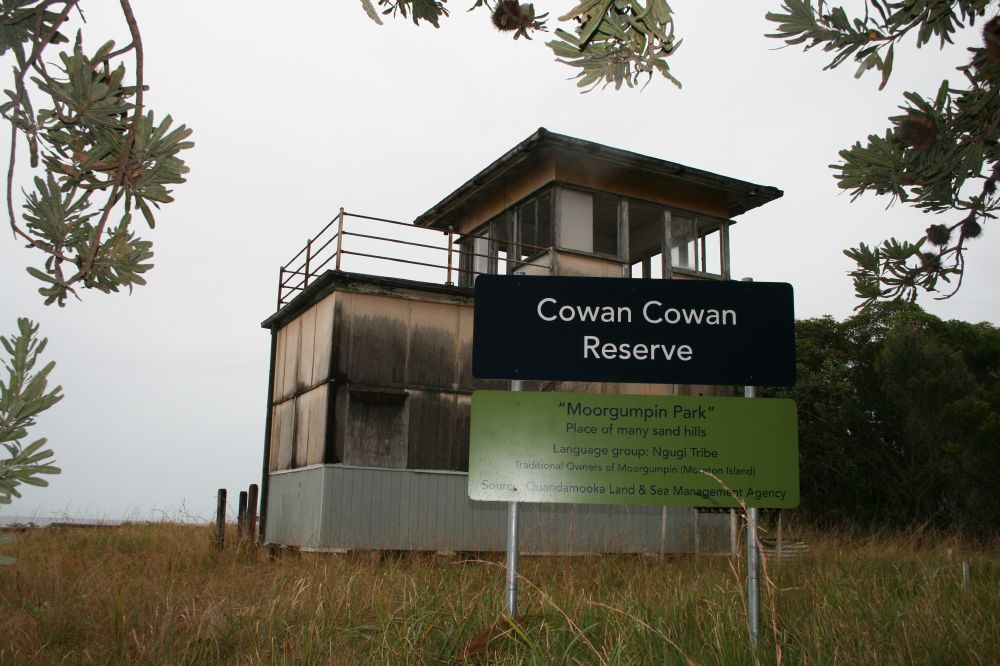
- Signal Station, 2006

- Location within Queensland Location within Australia
- 27.1273°S 153.3649°E
- Location: 25 Dorothy Newnham Street, Cowan Cowan, Moreton Island, City of Brisbane, Queensland, Australia

History
- Design period: 1919–1930s (interwar period)
- Built: 1930s

Queensland Heritage Register
- Official name: Signal Station (former), Former Navy Signal Station Fort Cowan
- Type: state heritage (built, archaeological)
- Designated: 1 February 1995
- Reference no.: 601097
- Significant period: 1930s (fabric); 1930s–1960s (historical)
- Significant components: slab/s – concrete

Signal Station, Moreton Island is a heritage-listed signal station at 25 Dorothy Newnham Street, Cowan Cowan, Moreton Island, City of Brisbane, Queensland, Australia. Built in the 1930s, the site is also sometimes referred to known as Former Navy Signal Station Fort Cowan. It was added to the Queensland Heritage Register on 1 February 1995.

== History ==
Erected probably during the late 1930s by the Royal Australian Navy, and acquired by the Queensland Government in 1947, this structure was the second signal station to be used at Cowan Cowan, on the western side of Moreton Island.

=== Founding ===
During the early period of the Moreton Bay penal settlement, vessels entered Moreton Bay primarily through the South Entrance, which was the passage between Moreton and North Stradbroke Islands. The first navigation aids were placed in Moreton Bay in 1825, and marked the south entrance. A Pilot Station was established at Amity Point on North Stradbroke Island by 1827. As the south entrance proved to be difficult and hazardous for vessels and during the 1830s, consideration was given to the advantages of using the northern entrance into Moreton Bay. However, despite the hazards, the southern entrance remained the preferred entrance to the Moreton Bay settlement as it better suited the colony; the entrances were already marked, and the pilot station was already established at Amity Point.

Following proclamation of Moreton Bay as a free settlement in 1842, the regulations, which had previously prohibited all but authorised vessels to come to an anchorage at a penal settlement except in cases of distress or necessity, were revoked, and shipping activity in Moreton Bay increased. Brisbane was declared a port of entry in 1846, and a Warehousing Port in 1849.

By the mid-1840s both the north and south entrances were used by vessels entering Moreton Bay. In 1846, Captain John Clements Wickham and Lieutenant Yule carried out extensive surveys in Moreton Bay and buoys marking the northern entrance were laid soon after. In April 1847, Sailing directions for the northern entrance were published in the Moreton Bay Courier in preparation for the closure of the southern passage as the main entrance to the Bay.

Indeed, these facilities served an important, potentially lifesaving function ships arriving and exiting the Port of Brisbane. Navigation in Moreton Bay was and remains difficult and potentially dangerous, and over the years been the site of a number of maritime accidents, in which ships either ran aground or foundered on the bay's many sandbanks. Following the sinking of the Sovereign off of Amity Point on March 10, 1847, a harbour master was appointed for Brisbane. Additional buoys were laid to better indicate the northern entrance, and in 1848 the pilot station was moved from Amity Point, firstly to Cowan Cowan and then to Bulwer, on Moreton Island. The pilot station marked the first official European settlement of Moreton Island.

The pilot station at Bulwer was closed in 1909, with the exception of the signalman who was also in charge of the telephone station. In 1912 the Signal Station was moved back to Cowan Cowan, considered to be more convenient for vessels using the North West Channel, which had been declared the safest entrance into Moreton Bay during the 1890s. The Channel ran close to the shore near Caloundra, across the bar in a southeasterly direction towards Moreton Island, and then southwesterly towards the mouth of the river, forming a Z-shaped route. James Palmer, the signalman at Bulwer, was appointed Signalman at Cowan Cowan Point from March 1913.

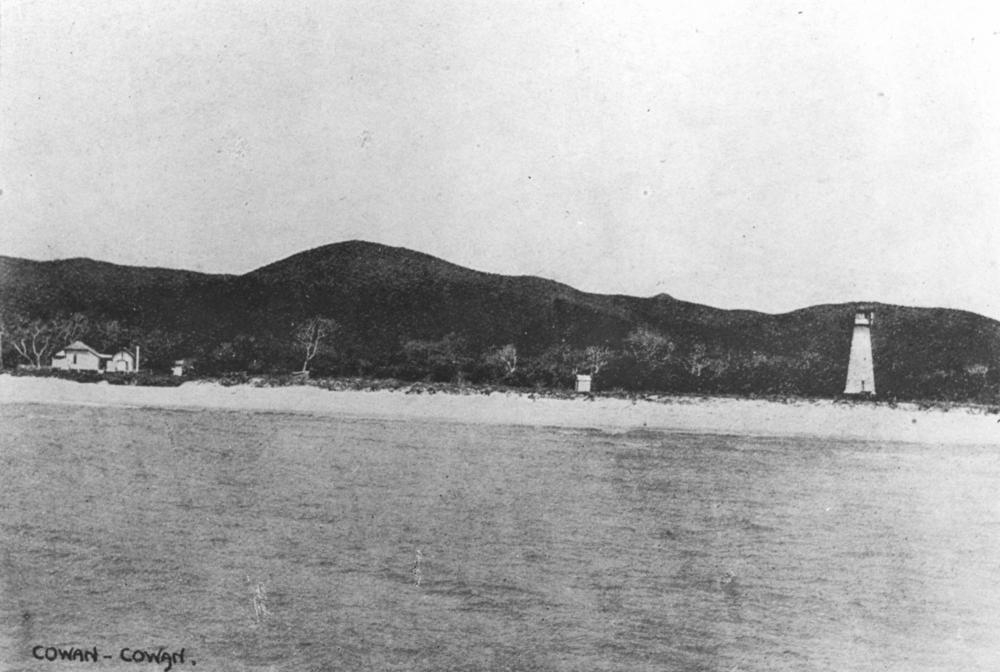
Pilot Station and lighthouse at Cowan Cowan

Other signalmen stationed at Cowan Cowan included Charles William Hill, Keeper of the Cowan Cowan light for a number of years, and Harry Wadsworth, appointed in 1939. By the mid-1940s, the Signal Station building which had been removed from Bulwer to Cowan Cowan, was in a deteriorated condition, and the erosion of the coastline placed the building in danger of falling into the sea.

=== Wartime service ===
Fort Cowan, located north of the Signal Station, was completed in the late 1930s (sources differ as to whether this was prior to or shortly after the commencement of the Second World War), and formed part of the defensive system for southeast Queensland. Other fortifications built throughout Moreton Bay during the Second World War included those at Caloundra, the Bribie Island Fortifications, and at Rous also on Moreton Island. Together with the existing installations at Fort Lytton (now part of Fort Lytton National Park), they formed a system of defensive batteries along the region's coast.

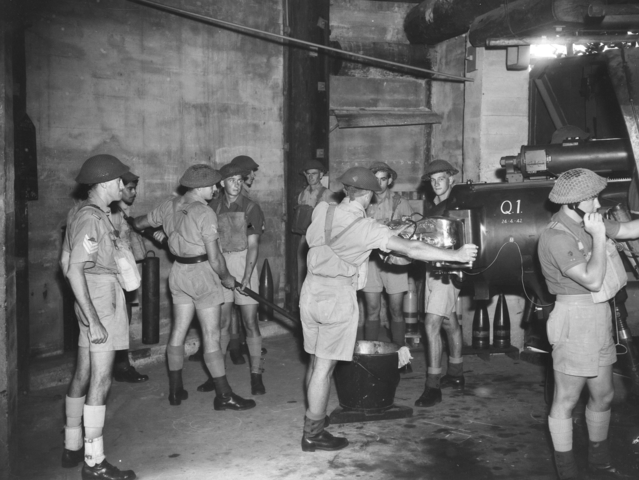
6 inch Mark XI gun and crew on Moreton Island, Queensland, November 1943

The shipping channels in Moreton Bay simplified the proposed placement of batteries. The major access route into the Brisbane River was still the North West Channel, which dictated the ideal positions for stationary artillery batteries, as the most effective sites for guns being the closest points to the channel bends. Fort Cowan took over the role of an Examination Battery from Fort Lytton, and a Port War Signal Station (PWSS), also referred to as the Naval Signal Station, was built in conjunction. The Examination Service was staffed by Naval Reserve Volunteers, who had been called up in August 1939. As described in a Navy paper prepared in 1949, the Examination Service was tasked with identifying, inspecting, and ascertaining the character and intentions of vessels seeking to enter defended ports. This was necessary, as their warnings allowed for the defences to be prepared in advance of an attempted entry by suspicious or unfriendly vessels. Prior to entry, merchant vessels approaching the port would be met by an Examination Vessel, stationed permanently at the Examination Anchorage near the harbour entrance. If an approaching vessel could not be identified, it was directed to proceed to the Examination Anchorage under the observation of the Examination Battery, whereby further investigation would be undertaken. The major function of the Naval Signal Station appears to have been to receive signals from the Examination Vessels and relay messages to the gunnery, allowing the transmission of signals without revealing the position of the battery. This process was not new to the Second World War, as at least two examination vessels appear to have also been stationed at Cowan Cowan during the First World War in response to the threat of German commerce raiders operating in the Pacific.

=== Postwar use ===
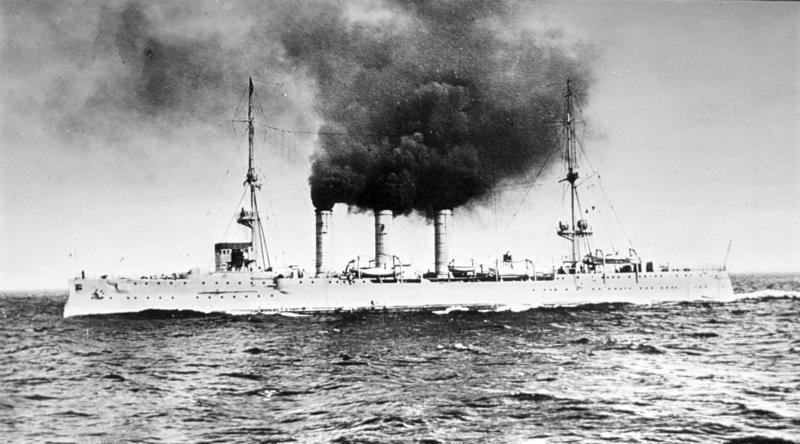
SMS Emden, a German cruiser, which during the opening months of World War I conducted raids on allied shipping and ports in the Pacific and Indian Oceans

All PWSSs were closed down after VJ Day in September 1945. In 1946, with its own Signal Station in a state of disrepair, the Department of Public Works in Queensland entered into negotiations with the Commonwealth Disposals Commission, for the purchase of the former Naval Signal Station, mast and a nearby signalman's cottage. Although consideration was given to acquiring and relocating the former Naval Signal Station, it was ultimately decided that to shift the building to another site would risk extensive damage to the fibro walls and roof, and that the building in its present position was in any case an ideal site for a Signal Station, with Signal tower mast and flag room close by. Moreover, this position has a commanding view of the bay, certainly more suitable than existing site of old signal station. The former Naval Signal Station, including the mast, and the residence were acquired by the Queensland Government in May 1947, for a sum of £1,300.

In 1954 the Postmaster-General's Department (PMG) proposed to establish a radio telephone communication service between Brisbane and Cowan Cowan. The PMG had previously expressed interest in acquiring the former Naval Signal Station to house radio and telephone equipment. However, upon inspecting the site, it was decided that the building was too large for the PMG's requirements. The radio telephone equipment was housed in the Signal Station and maintained by Wadsworth in addition to his signal station and lighthouse duties.

With the advent of VHF radio communication for shipping in the early 1960s, the need for signal stations was reduced, and following Wadsworth's retirement in December it was decided to close the Signal Station. However, the lighthouse, which had been converted to an automatic gas light in 1950, would continue to operate unattended.

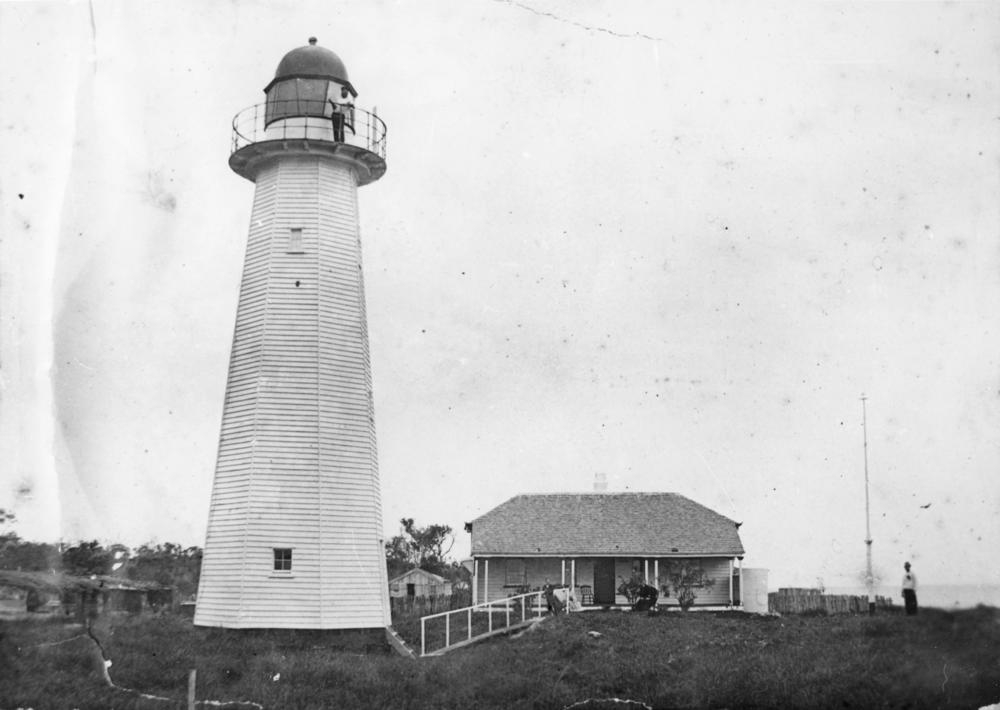
Cowan Cowan Point Light, 1899

Wadsworth and his wife Jessie, had acquired land adjacent to the Signal Station in 1952. Following the closure of the Signal Station, the Wadsworths sought to acquire the use of part of the signal station building, and were granted an Informal Lease over the former Signal Station site in 1967.

In 1976, the Australian Telecommunications Commission (Telecom) removed the radio telephone equipment installed by the former PMG's Department.

=== Conversion into park ===
Harry Wadsworth died in 1979, and Jessie died in 1985. In 1987, the Brisbane City Council recommended that the land be set aside as a recreation reserve and a Reserve for Local Government (Historical Park and Recreation) Purposes was gazetted in 1989, under the control of the Brisbane City Council as trustee.

The timber stairs to the upper level of the structure were removed in May 1990. The radio mast/signal mast was dismantled and moved to the Enoggera Army Barracks in 1993, as the mast was infested with white ants and one of the stays fallen onto the beach.

== Description ==
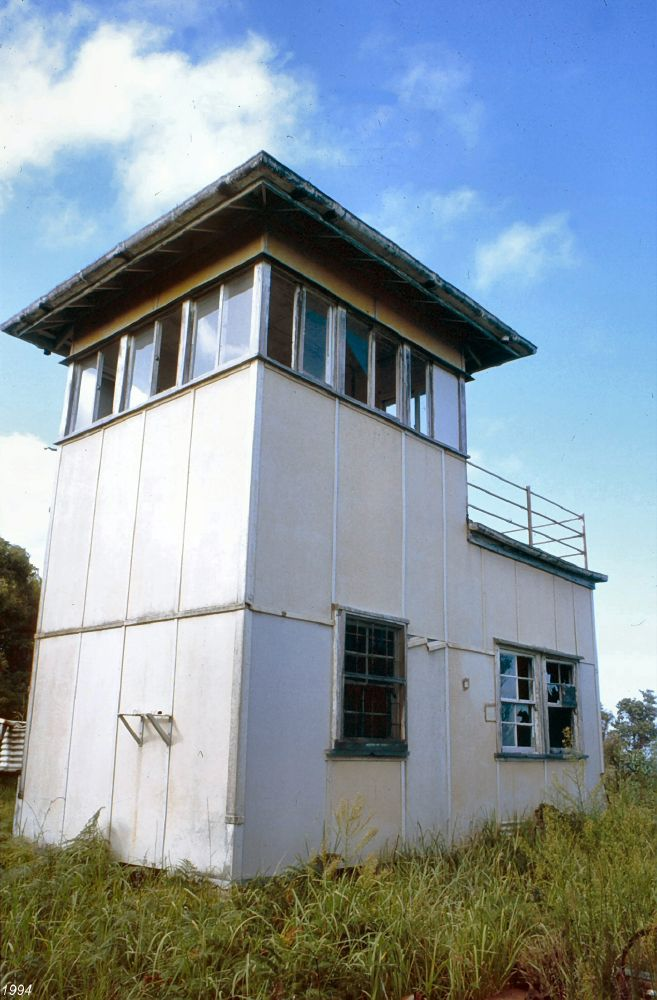
Signal station, 1994

Located on the western side of Moreton Island at Cowan Cowan, the two storied Signal Station is positioned behind the first dune overlooking the beach and shipping channel. To the north along the beach are the remains of concrete gun emplacements.

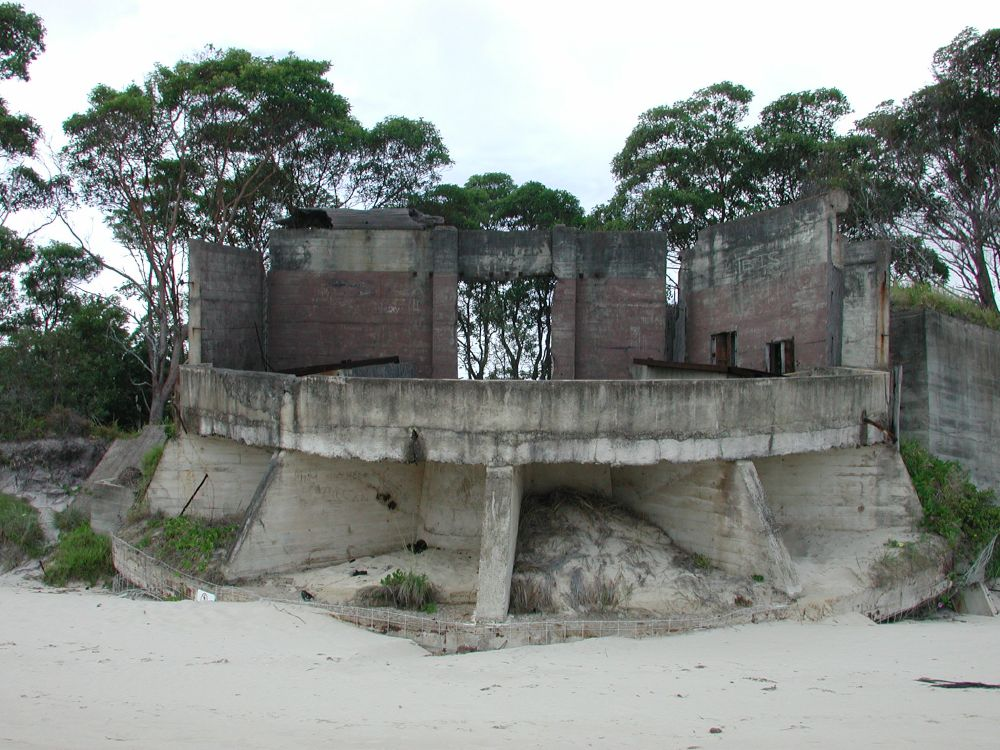
Remains of Cowan Cowan Battery

A small timber-framed building, rectangular in plan, it is mounted on low concrete stumps and clad internally and externally with asbestos cement sheeting and asbestos cement cover strips. On the southeast corner a double row of stumps lead to a timber door indicating the former position of the entry steps. This door opens into the lower level which consists of two rooms joined by a connecting door. These rooms have suspended timber floors and double hung timber framed windows which are barred and screened.

The upper level, similarly divided into two, consists of a single room with a hip roof and a roof terrace providing a panoramic view. This upper level is inaccessible as the staircase, formerly an external stair on the eastern side of the building, has been removed. The room has continuous windows running around the perimeter walls which are interrupted only by the two doorways. A doorway remains which would have formerly been at the top of the stair. Another doorway, in the centre of the southern wall, opens from the room onto the roof terrace.

A number of small concrete slabs and other remains are located in the grass around the Signal Station.

== Heritage listing ==
The former Signal Station was listed on the Queensland Heritage Register on 1 February 1995 having satisfied the following criteria.

The place is important in demonstrating the evolution or pattern of Queensland's history.

The Former Signal Station survives as evidence of the role of Cowan Cowan and Moreton Island in the Moreton Bay navigation network, from the mid-19th century when the pilot station was relocated from North Stradbroke to Moreton Island. Located as part of the former Fort Cowan/Cowan Cowan Battery, this former Naval Signal Station has an association with the defence of Queensland during the Second World War by the Australian Military Force and particularly by the Royal Australian Navy. The former Naval Signal Station is also significant as part of the Cowan Cowan Battery, in turn, part of an integrated series of defence batteries around Moreton Bay.

The place is important in demonstrating the principal characteristics of a particular class of cultural places.

The Former Signal Station survives as evidence of the role of Cowan Cowan and Moreton Island in the Moreton Bay navigation network, from the mid-19th century when the pilot station was relocated from North Stradbroke to Moreton Island.
