= Potton (disambiguation) =

Potton is a town and civil parish in Bedfordshire, England.

Potton may also refer to:

- Potton (1814 ship)
- Potton, Quebec, a Canadian township
- Potton United F.C., an English football club based in Potton, Bedfordshire
- Richard de Potton (13th-century–c. 1270), a 13th-century English bishop
