= Oscar (ship) =

Several ships have been named Oscar:

== Oscar (1809) ==
Oscar, of 205 tons (bm), was a Danish vessel, taken in prize, that first entered Lloyd's Register (LR) in 1809. She began trading between Greenock and New Brunswick. In 1812 she made a voyage as a whaler to East Greenland. She returned having taken 12 whales, four seals, one bear, and a narwhal. Outward bound on her second whaling voyage, Oscar, John Innes, master, was wrecked at Greyhope Bay, Aberdeen on 1 April 1813. All but two of her crew of 45 men drowned.

== Oscar (1814 ship) ==
Oscar was launched at Sunderland in 1814. From about 1825 she started trading with the Cape of Good Hope (CGH) and eastward. In 1828 she was returning from Batavia when she had to put back there leaky. She was condemned there.
