= List of shipwrecks in March 1847 =

The list of shipwrecks in March 1847 includes ships sunk, foundered, wrecked, grounded, or otherwise lost during March 1847.

== 1 March ==
List of shipwrecks: 1 March 1847
Ship	State	Description
Argyle	United Kingdom	The ship was holed by her anchor and sank at Tralee, County Kerry.

== 2 March ==
List of shipwrecks: 2 March 1847
Ship	State	Description
Anna Maria	Spain	The brigantine was driven ashore at Cádiz.
Carmen	Spain	The polacca was driven ashore between "Puerto Piojo" and Seville.
Ocean	United Kingdom	The ship was wrecked on the Colorados, off the coast of Cuba. She was on a voyage from New Orleans, Louisiana to Liverpool, Lancashire.
Peliano	Spain	The ship was driven ashore at Cádiz. She was on a voyage from Cádiz to Santiago de Cuba, Cuba.
HMS Thunderbolt	Royal Navy	The Driver-class sloop was wrecked at Cape Recife, Cape Colony.

== 3 March ==
List of shipwrecks: 3 March 1847
Ship	State	Description
Amelia	Prussia	The ship was driven ashore at Memel. She was on a voyage from Memel to Hartlepool, County Durham, United Kingdom. She was refloated on 5 March.
Chance	United Kingdom	The ship ran aground and was damaged at South Shields, County Durham. She was on a voyage from Rotterdam, South Holland, Netherlands to South Shields.
Governor Harvey	(United Kingdom of Great Britain and Ireland) British North America	The schooner was driven ashore and wrecked at Alicante, Spain.
Joven Claudio	Spain	The lugger was driven ashore at "Puerto Piojo". She was refloated.
Mary Ann Mitchell	United Kingdom	The brigantine foundered in the Atlantic Ocean. Her crew were rescued by the schooner Belle (United Kingdom). Mary Ann Mitchell was on a voyage from Waterford to Galaţi, Ottoman Empire.

== 4 March ==
List of shipwrecks: 4 March 1847
Ship	State	Description
Albert	United Kingdom	The ship was driven ashore 8 nautical miles (15 km) east of Calais, France. She was on a voyage from London to Dunkirk, Nord, France.
Ark	United Kingdom	The ship ran aground on Scroby Sands, Norfolk.
Jack o'Lantern	United Kingdom	The ship departed from Seville, Spain for London. No further trace, presumed foundered with the loss of all hands.
Jupiter	United Kingdom	The ship ran aground on Scroby Sands.

== 5 March ==
List of shipwrecks: 5 March 1847
Ship	State	Description
Sally	United Kingdom	The ship ran aground at Faversham, Kent. She was on a voyage from Newcastle upon Tyne, Northumberland to Faversham.
Octavie	Belgium	The ship was wrecked near Mogadore, Morocco.
William	United Kingdom	The ship was beached at Santa Eugènia, Mallorca, Spain.
Zampa	France	The brig ran aground on the Punta Reef, off the coast of Cuba and was damaged. She was on a voyage from Havana, Cuba to Havre de Grâce, Seine-Inférieure. She was refloated.

== 6 March ==
List of shipwrecks: 6 March 1847
Ship	State	Description
Cora	United States	The ship was abandoned in the Atlantic Ocean. Her crew were rescued by Vermont (United States. Cora was on a voyage from Philadelphia, Pennsylvania to Belfast, County Antrim, United Kingdom.
Isaac	(United Kingdom of Great Britain and Ireland) Cape Colony	The sloop was wrecked in Struys Bay.
Mary Ann	(United Kingdom of Great Britain and Ireland) Saint Lucia	The schooner was wrecked in Caville Bay.

== 7 March ==
List of shipwrecks: 7 March 1847
Ship	State	Description
Ann	United Kingdom	The brig ran aground on the Maplin Sand, in the North Sea off the coast of Essex. She was refloated on 9 March and taken in to Sheerness, Kent.
Betsy	United Kingdom	The ship was driven ashore 2 nautical miles (3.7 km) south of Southport, Lancashire. She was on a voyage from Liverpool, Lancashire to Newry, County Antrim.
Kennebec	United States	The ship was abandoned in the Atlantic Ocean. Her crew were rescued. She was on a voyage from New York to the Clyde.
Louise	France	The brig was wrecked near Cherchel, Algeria. Her crew were rescued.
Sarah	United States	The ship was abandoned in the Atlantic Ocean. Five crew were rescued by Cambridge (United Kingdom). Sarah was on a voyage from New York to Cork, United Kingdom.
Vrouw Johanna	Netherlands	The ship ran aground on the Burbo Bank, in Liverpool Bay. She was on a voyage from Schiedam, South Holland to Liverpool. She was refloated and taken in to Liverpool in a leaky condition.

== 8 March ==
List of shipwrecks: 8 March 1847
Ship	State	Description
Ann	United Kingdom	The ship ran aground and was damaged on the Maplin Sand, in the North Sea off the coast of Essex. She was refloated and beached at Sheerness, Kent.
China	United Kingdom	The ship was damaged by fire at St. Katherine's Dock, London.
Sarah	United Kingdom	The ship was driven ashore at Gallipoli, Ottoman Empire. She was on a voyage from Smyrna, Ottoman Empire to London.
Zaddora	Spain	The brig was wrecked near Nuevitas, Cuba.

== 9 March ==
List of shipwrecks: 9 March 1847
Ship	State	Description
Butten	Kingdom of Hanover	The ship was driven ashore and wrecked near Løkken, Denmark. Her crew survived. She was on a voyage from Wick, Caithness, United Kingdom to Stettin. She was refloated on 2 April.
Chanticleer	United Kingdom	The ship was lost near the Bird Rock, off Crooked Island, Bahamas. She was on a voyage from Jamaica to London.
Earl of Durham	United Kingdom	The ship was driven ashore in Cockle Bay, Saint Kitts.
Genius	Denmark	The ship was driven ashore and wrecked near Karlebo. Her crew were rescued. She was on a voyage from Denmark to Greenland.
Ingeborg Marie Jensen	Denmark	The ship was driven ashore at "Horu". she was on a voyage from Svendborg to London.
Johan, or Johanne	Denmark	The sloop was wrecked on the east coast of Læsø. Her crew survived. She was on a voyage from Copenhagen to Hull, Yorkshire, United Kingdom.
Thekla	Netherlands	The koff was driven ashore near Karlebo. Her crew were rescued. Her crew were rescued. She was on a voyage from Sunderland, County Durham, United Kingdom to Copenhagen She was refloated and taken in to Grenaa.

== 10 March ==
List of shipwrecks: 10 March 1847
Ship	State	Description
Cumberland	United States	The ship was wrecked on Cayo Brelon with the loss of two of her crew. She was on a voyage from Philadelphia, Pennsylvania to Cienfuegos, Cuba.
Eugenia	United Kingdom	The ship was driven ashore at South Foreland, Kent. She was on a voyage from Bangor, Caernarfonshire to London. She was refloated on 13 March and put in to Ramsgate, Kent in a leaky condition.
Flora	United Kingdom	The ship was in collision with Two Brothers (United Kingdom) in the North Sea and was damaged. She was beached the next day at Lowestoft, Suffolk. She was on a voyage from Colchester, Essex to Leith, Lothian.
Henry and Sarah	United Kingdom	The ship was driven ashore and sank near Dover, Kent. Her crew were rescued. She was on a voyage from Swansea, Glamorgan to Newcastle upon Tyne, Northumberland.
Lamartine	France	The ship was lost off Aitutaki, Cook Islands.
Madras	United Kingdom	The ship was abandoned in the Atlantic Ocean. Her eleven crew were rescued by Liverpool (United Kingdom). Madras was on a voyage from New York, United States to Rotterdam, South Holland, Netherlands.
Perseverance	United Kingdom	The ship was driven ashore and wrecked at South Foreland. She was on a voyage from Waterford to London. She was refloated on 15 March but capsized on the Sandwich Flats. Perseverance was subsequently righted and taken in to Ramsgate, Kent, where she was condemned.
Sovereign	(United Kingdom of Great Britain and Ireland) New South Wales	The steamship was wrecked at Amity Point with the loss of 44 of the 54 people on board. She was on a voyage from Brisbane to Sydney.
Trial	United Kingdom	The full-rigged ship was abandoned in the Atlantic Ocean. Her crew were rescued by Henry Volant (United States). Trial was on a voyage from Newport, Monmouthshire to Boston, Massachusetts, United States.

== 11 March ==
List of shipwrecks: 11 March 1847
Ship	State	Description
Agenoria	United Kingdom	The ship ran aground on the Whiting Sand, in the North Sea off the coast of Suffolk. She was on a voyage from London to Wisbech, Cambridgeshire. She was refloated, repaired and resumed her voyage.
Arthur	Prussia	The schooner was driven ashore and wrecked near "Cummin". Her crew were rescued. She was on a voyage from Pillau to London.
Jessie	United Kingdom	The ship, a brig or schooner, foundered in the North Sea off the Farne Islands, Northumberland during a squall with the loss of all hands, at least four lives. She was on a voyage from Newcastle upon Tyne, Northumberland to Grangemouth, Stirlingshire.
Jessie Alexander	United Kingdom	The ship ran aground on the Oat Car Rock, off the coast of County Durham and was severely damaged. She was refloated and resumed her voyage.
Lady Ross	United Kingdom	The ship was in collision with the schooner Rose (United Kingdom and foundered in the North Sea off the Farne Islands, Northumberland. Her crew were rescued. She was on a voyage from South Sunderland, County Durham to Littleferry, Sutherland.
Latona	Stettin	The ship was driven ashore near Warnemünde, Prussia. She was on a voyage from Stettin to Sunderland, County Durham. She had become a wreck by 18 March.
Nautilus	United Kingdom	The ship was in collision with the clipper Dee and sank off Stonehaven, Aberdeenshire with the loss of a crew member. She was on a voyage from Alloa, Clackmannanshire to Aberdeen.

== 11 March ==
List of shipwrecks: 11 March 1847
Ship	State	Description
Eugene	United Kingdom	The ship was abandoned in the Atlantic Ocean. Her crew were rescued. She was on a voyage from New York, United States to an Irish port.

== 12 March ==
List of shipwrecks: 12 March 1847
Ship	State	Description
Catherine	United Kingdom	The barque ran aground on the Colorados. She was refloated but consequently foundered off Cape San Antonio, Cuba. Her crew were rescued. She was on a voyage from Jamaica to Glasgow, Renfrewshire. Date also reported as 20 March.
Eliza Keith	United Kingdom	The ship was driven ashore at South Foreland, Kent. She was refloated and taken in to The Downs.
Tamar	United Kingdom	The schooner was in collision with the brig Millhall (United Kingdom) and was abandoned in the North Sea off Lowestoft, Suffolk. Her crew were rescued by Millhall. Tamar was on a voyage from London to Goole, Yorkshire.

== 13 March ==
List of shipwrecks: 13 March 1847
Ship	State	Description
Commerce	Russian Empire	The ship was driven ashore at Pillau, Prussia. She was refloated on 28 March and taken in to Pillau.
George and Ann	United Kingdom	The schooner ran aground on the Newcombe Sand, in the North Sea off the coast of Suffolk. She was on a voyage from Cardiff, Glamorgan to Newcastle upon Tyne, Northumberland. She was refloated and resumed her voyage.
Manly	United Kingdom	The barque was wrecked on the Mantaiaer Shoal, in Spanish East Indies waters. She was on a voyage from Lombok, Netherlands East Indies to China.

== 14 March ==
List of shipwrecks: 14 March 1847
Ship	State	Description
Angerona	United Kingdom	The ship was wrecked off Bermuda. She was on a voyage from Aux Cayes, Haiti to Falmouth, Cornwall.
Magnet	United Kingdom	The schooner struck the Newholm Rock, off the Orkney Islands and sank. All on board were rescued. She was on a voyage from Leith, Lothian to Stromness, Orkney Islands.
Quatre Frères	France	The ship was wrecked on Great Heneagua. Her crew were rescued. She was on a voyage from Saint Domingo to Havre de Grâce, Seine-Inférieure.

== 15 March ==
List of shipwrecks: 15 March 1847
Ship	State	Description
Amici	United Kingdom	The ship ran aground at Redcar, Yorkshire. She was on a voyage from London to Stockton-on-Tees, County Durham. She was refloated on 16 March and taken in to the River Tees.
Mary Eleanor	United Kingdom	The ship was abandoned in the Atlantic Ocean (44°14′N 28°10′W). Her crew were rescued. She was on a voyage from Sligo to Baltimore, Maryland, United States.
Montgomery	United States	The ship was driven ashore and wrecked in Struys Bay. She was on a voyage from Manila, Spanish East Indies to Boston, Massachusetts.

== 16 March ==
List of shipwrecks: 16 March 1847
Ship	State	Description
Dublin	United Kingdom	The ship was wrecked at the Old Head of Kinsale, County Cork with the loss of six of her crew. She was on a voyage from Montevideo, Uruguay to Liverpool, Lancashire.
Fishburn	United Kingdom	The ship ran aground and broke her back in the River Nene. She was on a voyage from Wisbech, Cambridgeshire to Havre de Grâce, Seine-Inférieure, France. She was refloated.
Gilbert Henderson	United Kingdom	The ship was driven ashore and wrecked in Algoa Bay.
Racer	United Kingdom	The ship was run down and sunk. Her crew were rescued by Azores Packet (United Kingdom). Racer was on a voyage from São Miguel Island, Azores to Penzance, Cornwall.
Schiller	Hamburg	The ship ran aground and capsized in the Köhlbrand. She was on a voyage from Harburg to London, United Kingdom. She was declared a total loss.

== 17 March ==
List of shipwrecks: 17 March 1847
Ship	State	Description
Affiance, or Defiance	United Kingdom	The ship struck the Runnel Stone and sank. Her crew were rescued by the schooner Eda (United Kingdom). Affiance was on a voyage from London to Galway.
London	United Kingdom	The full-rigged ship was driven ashore near Drogheda, County Louth. She was refloated and put back to Liverpool.
Mason	United States	The ship was driven ashore near Havana, Cuba. She was on a voyage from Liverpool, Lancashire, United Kingdom to Havana. She was later refloated and taken in to Havana for repairs.
New Model	United States	The ship was abandoned in the Atlantic Ocean. Her crew were rescued by Fanny (United Kingdom). She was on a voyage from Baltimore, Maryland to Cork, United Kingdom.
Princess Royal	United Kingdom	The ship was wrecked at Cranberry Head, British North America. She was on a voyage from Saint John, New Brunswick to Yarmouth, Nova Scotia.
Tigre	France	The ship ran aground on the Punta Reef, off Havana. She was on a voyage from Havre de Grâce, Seine-Inférieure to Havana. She was refloated and taken in to Havana for repairs.

== 19 March ==
List of shipwrecks: 19 March 1847
Ship	State	Description
Charles	United Kingdom	The barque was abandoned in the Atlantic Ocean. Her crew were rescued by Auricula (United Kingdom). Charles was on a voyage from Moulmein, Burma to Falmouth, Cornwall.
Stag	United Kingdom	The ship was beached at the Chameleon Fort, Galway. She was on a voyage from Cádiz, Spain to Galway.
William Caldwell	(United Kingdom of Great Britain and Ireland) British North America	The schooner was wrecked on the Ragged Islands. All on board were rescued.

== 18 March ==
List of shipwrecks: 18 March 1847
Ship	State	Description
Matilda	United States	The brig was abandoned in the Atlantic Ocean. She was on a voyage from New York to Cork, United Kingdom.
Otteren	France	The ship ran aground and was damaged at St. Ubes, Portugal. She was on a voyage from Rochefort, Charente-Maritime to St. Ubes. She was refloated.

== 19 March ==
List of shipwrecks: 19 March 1847
Ship	State	Description
Mare	United Kingdom	The ship was destroyed by fire in the Hooghly River. She was on a voyage from Calcutta, India to Dundee, Forfarshire.

== 20 March ==
List of shipwrecks: 20 March 1847
Ship	State	Description
Agility; HMS Blenheim	United Kingdom; Royal Navy	The Vengeur-class ship of the line HMS Blenheim was in collision with the brig Cactus (United Kingdom in the River Thames and was driven ashore on the Essex bank. HMS Monkey (Royal Navy) attempted to refloat HMS Blenheim but the two vessels collided and HMS Blenheim was driven into the brig Agility which was severely damaged. HMS Monkey assisted in beaching Agility on the Essex bank. HMS Blenheim was subsequently refloated and taken in to Woolwich, Kent.
Caspian	United States	The ship was abandoned in the Atlantic Ocean. Her crew were rescued by Levant (United Kingdom). Caspian was on a voyage from Philadelphia, Pennsylvania to Liverpool, Lancashire, United Kingdom.
Halifax	United Kingdom	The ship was driven ashore in Ardbear Bay, County Cork. Her crew were rescued. She was on a voyage from Callao, Peru to Cork.
Minerva	United Kingdom	The ship ran aground and was wrecked at Douglas, Isle of Man. She was on a voyage from Liverpool to Galaţi, Ottoman Empire.
Premier	United Kingdom	The ship ran aground off St Mary's, Isles of Scilly. She was on a voyage from Nevis to London. She was refloated and taken in to New Grimsby, Isles of Scilly.
Princess Alice	United Kingdom	The ship was driven ashore at Howth, County Dublin. She was on a voyage from Liverpool, Lancashire to New York. She was refloated and taken in to Howth. She was refloated on 31 March and taken in to Dublin for repairs.
Susannah Ann	United Kingdom	The schooner was wrecked in the Cook Strait at the entrance to Queen Charlotte Sound.

== 21 March ==
List of shipwrecks: 21 March 1847
Ship	State	Description
Thomas	United Kingdom	The ship was driven ashore at Skibbereen, County Cork. She was on a voyage from London to Westport, County Mayo.

== 22 March ==
List of shipwrecks: April 1847
Ship	State	Description
Cactus	United Kingdom	The ship was wrecked at Truro, Massachusetts, United States with the loss of all hands. She was on a voyage from Boston, Massachusetts to Cork.
Vermont	United States	The schooner was driven ashore and wrecked 30 nautical miles (56 km) north of Alvarado, Mexico. Her crew survived. They were taken prisoner by the Mexicans but were later released.

== 23 March ==
List of shipwrecks: 23 March 1847
Ship	State	Description
Buteshire	United Kingdom	The ship was wrecked on Diamond Point, Cuba. Her crew were rescued. She was on a voyage from London to Havana, Cuba.
Demerara	United Kingdom	The abandoned brig foundered in the Atlantic Ocean.
Favourite	United Kingdom	The ship was driven ashore at the "Giant's Stairs", County Cork.
Three Brothers	United Kingdom	The ship was driven ashore at Shoreham-by-Sea, Sussex. She was on a voyage from Shoreham-by-Sea to a French port.

== 24 March ==
List of shipwrecks: 24 March 1847
Ship	State	Description
Amicitia	United Kingdom	The ship was wrecked on the Arklow Bank, in the Irish Sea off the coast of County Wicklow. Her crew were rescued. She was on a voyage from Whitehaven, Cumberland to Cardiff, Glamorgan.
Concord	United Kingdom	The ship was abandoned in the Atlantic Ocean. Her crew were rescued by Quebec (United Kingdom). Concord was on a voyage from Porto Caballo, Venezuela to Liverpool, Lancashire.
Elizabeth	United Kingdom	The ship ran aground on the Goodwin Sands, Kent. She was on a voyage from Portsmouth, Hampshire to London. She was refloated and resumed her voyage.
Helen Scott	United Kingdom	The ship was driven ashore in Roche's Bay, County Cork. She was on a voyage from Cork to Constantinople, Ottoman Empire. She had been refloated by 6 April and taken in to Cork.
Ketty	United Kingdom	The ship foundered east of the Scalp. Her crew were rescued. She was on a voyage from Portree, Isle of Skye to Lochgilphead, Argyllshire.
Sarah Adams	United States	The ship departed from Baltimore, Maryland for an Irish port. No further trace, presumed foundered with the loss of all hands.
Spec	United Kingdom	The ship ran aground on the Goodwin Sands. She was on a voyage from Exeter, Devon to Middlesbrough, Yorkshire.
Ugland	Norway	The sloop ran aground and sank off Copenhagen. Her crew were rescued. She was on a voyage from Grimstad to Copenhagen.

== 25 March ==
List of shipwrecks: 25 March 1847
Ship	State	Description
Harriet Burnett	United Kingdom	The ship ran aground off Mistley, Essex.
Katharina	Russia	The full-rigged ship was driven ashore in the Dardanelles.
Maria	United Kingdom	The schooner struck the Bo Nap Rock, capsized and sank. Her four crew survived. She was on a voyage from Irvine, Ayrshire to Oban, Argyllshire.
Meanwell	United Kingdom	The ship ran aground on a reef off "Siluria". She was on a voyage from Constantinople, Ottoman Empire to Heraklia, Greece.
Triton	United Kingdom	The ship ran aground on the Goodwin Sands, Kent. She was on a voyage from Hamburg to Plymouth, Devon. She was refloated and taken in to The Downs.
Vindicator	United Kingdom	The ship departed from Liverpool, Lancashire for Quebec City, Province of Canada, British North America. No further trace, presumed foundered with the loss of all hands.

== 26 March ==
List of shipwrecks: 26 March 1847
Ship	State	Description
Eliza Scotland	United Kingdom	The ship was driven ashore at Cobh, County Cork. She was on a voyage from Cork to Constantinople, Ottoman Empire. She was refloated but drove ashore again and was wrecked.
France	United Kingdom	The ship was driven ashore at Swan Point, Maryland, United States. She was on a voyage from Baltimore, Maryland to London.
John Marshall	United Kingdom	The ship was driven ashore near Chester, Pennsylvania. She was refloated on 28 March and taken in to Philadelphia, Pennsylvania. She was on a voyage from London to Philadelphia.
Mary and Eliza	United Kingdom	The ship was wrecked in Oysterhaven with the loss of all hands.
Mary Ann	(United Kingdom of Great Britain and Ireland) British North America	The ship was driven ashore on Reedy Island, Delaware, United States. She was on a voyage from Halifax, Nova Scotia to Philadelphia, Pennsylvania, United States.
Mary Ann	United States	The schooner sank at New York.
Monongahela	United Kingdom	The ship was driven ashore at Philadelphia. She was refloated on 28 March.

== 27 March ==
List of shipwrecks: 27 March 1847
Ship	State	Description
France	United Kingdom	The ship was driven ashore south of Baltimore, Maryland, United States.
Nordhuset	Netherlands	The ship ran aground on the Haisborough Sands, in the North Sea off the coast of Norfolk, United Kingdom. She was refloated on 31 March and taken in to Great Yarmouth, Norfolk.

== 28 March ==
List of shipwrecks: 28 March 1847
Ship	State	Description
Monica	United Kingdom	The ship was driven ashore and wrecked at Warkworth, Northumberland. She was on a voyage from Warkworth to London.
Shamrock	United Kingdom	The ship ran aground on the Herd Sand, in the North Sea off the coast of County Durham. She was refloated on 1 April and taken in to South Shields.
Whitehaven	United Kingdom	The ship ran aground at Cardigan. She was on a voyage from Cardigan to Cardiff, Glamorgan. She was refloated on 30 March and taken in to Cardigan.

== 29 March ==
List of shipwrecks: 29 March 1847
Ship	State	Description
Commerce	United Kingdom	The ship was driven ashore and wrecked.
Consort	United Kingdom	The ship was abandoned off the coast of Ireland. Her crew were rescued.
Friends	United Kingdom	The ship ran aground and was damaged on the Herd Sand, in the North Sea off the coast of County Durham. She was refloated and taken in to South Shields, County Durham.
Herald	United Kingdom	The ship ran aground and was damaged on the Herd Sand. She was refloated and taken in to South Shields.
Rugia	Prussia	The ship ran aground at Memel. She was on a voyage from Memel to Amsterdam, North Holland, Netherlands. She was refloated.
William and Henry	United Kingdom	The ship ran aground and was damaged on the Herd Sand. She was refloated and taken in to South Shields.

== 30 March ==
List of shipwrecks: 30 Thomas 1847
Ship	State	Description
Admiral Rodney	United Kingdom	The schooner ran aground on the North Gar Sandbank, in the North Sea off the coast of Yorkshire. She was refloated and taken in to Middlesbrough, Yorkshire in a leaky condition.
Defiance	United Kingdom	The ship was destroyed by fire at Peterhead, Aberdeenshire.
Diploma	United States	The brig was destroyed by fire at Boston, Massachusetts.
Emma	Denmark	The brig was driven ashore on Scharhörn. She was on a voyage from Naples, Kingdom of the Two Sicilies to Hamburg. She was refloated the next day and taken in to Cuxhaven in a leaky condition.
Geerdina	Hamburg	The ship ran aground at Hamburg.
James Gibson	United Kingdom	The ship was driven ashore and damaged at Gibraltar. She was on a voyage from Hull, Yorkshire to Alexandria, Egypt. She was refloated.
Johannes	Denmark	The ship departed from Helsingør for Newcastle upon Tyne, Northumberland, United Kingdom. No further trace, presumed foundered with the loss of all hands.
Joven Esegnio	Spain	The ship was driven ashore at Adra.
Marie	Prussia	The ship was driven ashore on the east coast of Læsø, Denmark. She was on a voyage from Wolgast to Antwerp, Belgium.
Zephyr	United Kingdom	The ship ran aground at Savanilla, Republic of New Granada.

== 31 March ==
List of shipwrecks: 31 March 1847
Ship	State	Description
Josephine	France	The ship was driven ashore near Brouwershaven, Zeeland, Netherlands. She was on a voyage from Marseille, Bouches-du-Rhône to Rotterdam, South Holland, Netherlands. She was refloated the next day and taken in to Brouwershaven, Zeeland.

== Unknown date ==
List of shipwrecks: Unknown date March 1847
Ship	State	Description
Bristol	United Kingdom	The barque was abandoned at sea. She was towed in to Bayonne, Basses-Pyrénées, France on 6 March.
Carl Johann	Flag unknown	The ship was driven ashore and wrecked near "Tromsal". She was on a voyage from Tromsal to Amsterdam, North Holland, Netherlands.
Fiume	Austrian Empire	The ship was wrecked at Eupatoria, Russia before 5 March.
Gloria	United Kingdom	The schooner ran aground on the Gunfleet Sand, in the North Sea off the coast of Essex. She was refloated and resumed her voyage.
Harriet Emma	United Kingdom	The ship ran aground and was damaged at Wisbech, Cambridgeshire. She was on a voyage from Wisbech to Rouen, Seine-Inférieure, France. She was refloated on 17 March.
Jeune Elise	France	The ship was destroyed by fire on the coast of Portugal before 8 March. Her crew were rescued by Mercury (United Kingdom).
Jeune Nancy	France	The barque was wrecked at Arrest, Somme before 22 March with the loss of thirteen of the eighteen people on board. She was on a voyage from Cuba to Bordeaux, Gironde.
Lively	United Kingdom	The ship ran aground on the Gunfleet Sand. She was refloated and resumed her voyage.
Lord Wellington	United Kingdom	The ship was driven ashore and damaged at Barnegat, New Jersey, United States before 12 March. She was refloated.
Medusa	United Kingdom	The ship was wrecked on the Luconia Shoals, in the South China Sea. She was on a voyage from Liverpool, Lancashire to China.
Montague	United Kingdom	The schooner capsized off the Cape Colony before 29 March.
Morbihan	France	The ship was wrecked at "Abrevack" before 21 March.
Nightingale	United Kingdom	The brig ran aground on the Maplin Sand, in the North Sea off the coast of Essex. She was refloated on 9 March and resumed her voyage.
Nymph	(United Kingdom of Great Britain and Ireland) British North America	The ship was abandoned in the Atlantic Ocean before 11 March.
Petit Nancy	France	The ship was wrecked Pointe de Coubre and "Terre Negre", Charente-Maritime. She was on a voyage from St. Jago de Cuba, Cuba to Bordeaux.
Picard	France	The ship was damaged at Calcutta, India before 15 March. She was consequently condemned.
Racer	United Kingdom	The ship was run down and sunk. Her crew were rescued. She was on a voyage from São Miguel Island, Azores to Penzance, Cornwall.
Ripson	United Kingdom	The ship ran aground on the Gunfleet Sand. She was on a voyage from Newcastle upon Tyne, Northumberland to London. She was refloated and taken in to the River Colne.
Rose	United Kingdom	The ship was driven ashore and severely damaged at Ballina, County Mayo. She was refloated on 31 March.
St. Cloud	United Kingdom	The ship was wrecked on the Florida Reef. She was on a voyage from New Orleans, Louisiana, United States to a European port.
St. Lawrence	United Kingdom	The ship was driven ashore in the Sea of Marmora before 13 March. She was refloated on 17 March and taken in to Constantinople, Ottoman Empire.
Sussannah Ann	(United Kingdom of Great Britain and Ireland) New Zealand	The schooner was wrecked on rocks near the mouth of Queen Charlotte Sound, New Zealand. All hands were saved.
Three Brothers	United Kingdom	The ship was abandoned in the Atlantic Ocean before 17 March. Her crew were rescued. She was on a voyage from Viana do Castelo, Portugal to Cork. She was taken in to Broadhaven Bay on 18 March.
Triton	United Kingdom	The barque was abandoned in the Atlantic Ocean before 18 March. She was on a voyage from a Welsh port to New York, United States.
Yalmar	United Kingdom	The schooner was in collision with another vessel and was abandoned in the North Sea before 13 March. She was taken in to Ramsgate, Kent on 14 March.
