= Timandra (ship) =

A number of ships have been named Timandra for the mythological Timandra:

- Timandra (1814 ship) was launched in 1814. She started trading with India and made one voyage for the British East India Company (EIC) before she was lost off the Lofoten Islands in 1822.
- Timandra (1822 ship) was launched in 1822 at Whitby. She sailed to India and South East Asia until she disappeared in June 1829 after leaving Batavia with a cargo of rice for Antwerp.
- Timandra (1841 ship) was built at Littlehampton and in 1841–42 carried immigrants to New Zealand for the New Zealand Company; Lloyd's Register for 1869 carries the notation "Wrecked" under her name.
- Timandra (1843 ship) was launched at Sunderland. In October 1858 she was sailing from Newcastle to Rockhampton with 105 passengers when she wrecked on Timandra Bank, Keppel Bay.
- Timandra (1885 ship), a merchant ship of 1562GRT, was built by Robert Duncan & Co., Glasgow. She was a fully rigged sailing ship and disappeared in March 1917 after having left Norfolk with a cargo of coal for Buenos Aires.

The following steamships were operated by A. Kirsten:

- SS Timandra (1898), to Kaiserliche Marine in 1914
- SS Timandra (1912), purchased 1939, seized by the United Kingdom in 1945
- SS Timandra (1951), sold in 1971

Citations
