= Princess Charlotte (1814 Bristol ship) =

History

United Kingdom
- Name: Princess Charlotte
- Owner: 1814: G. Hillhouse, Sons & Co., Bristol; 1836: Miles & Co., Bristol.; 1839: Manning & Co., London.; 1842: Farquharson & Co., London.; 1844: Cox & Co., London.; 1846: Sweeting & Co., London.
- Builder: G. Hillhouse, Sons & Co., Bristol
- Launched: 1814
- Fate: Sold in 1848 for breaking up
- Notes: One source attributes to this Princess Charlotte, a voyage for the British East India Company actually performed by Princess Charlotte (1813 Sunderland ship).

General characteristics
- Tons burthen: 401, or 411, or 4113/94 (bm)
- Length: 112 ft 5 in (34.3 m)
- Beam: 28 ft 7 in (8.7 m)

Princess Charlotte was launched in 1814 at Bristol. She spent almost all of her career as a West Indiaman, though she did make voyages to North America and Africa. In 1848 she was sold for breaking up.

== Career ==
Princess Charlotte first appeared in Lloyd's Register (LR) in 1815.

Year	Master	Owner	Trade	Source & notes
1815	J.Ray	Hillhouse	Bristol–Jamaica	LR
1820	T.Payne	Vaughn	Bristol–Jamaica	LR
1825	T.Payne	Vaughn	Bristol–Jamaica	LR
1830	J.Pike	Vaughn	Bristol–Jamaica	LR
1835	J.Pike	Miles & Co.	Bristol–Jamaica	LR
1839	Reynolds; Maitland	Miles & Co. Manning & Co.	Bristol–Jamaica; London–Quebec	LR; small repairs 1836 & 1837
1844	E.Hough	Farquarson & Co.	London–Honduras; Ichaboe Island	LR
1845	E.Hough	Farquarson & Co.	Ichaboe; London–Quebec	LR
1848	A.Beech	Sweeting		LR

== Fate ==
Princess Charlotte was sold in 1848 for breaking up.
