= Regret (1814 ship) =

History

United Kingdom
- Name: Regret
- Owner: John Watson, Henry Barrick, and George Barrick, Jnr.
- Builder: T. Barrick, Whitby,
- Launched: 1814
- Fate: Burnt September 1822

General characteristics
- Type: Ship
- Tons burthen: 356, or 357 (bm)
- Propulsion: Sail
- Armament: 2 × 4-pounder guns (1815)

Regret was launched at Whitby in 1814. She traded with the East Indies under license from the British East India Company (EIC). She also made one voyage for the EIC. A fire destroyed Batavia Roads in September 1822.

== Career ==
Regret appears in the Register of Shipping in 1815 with trade Whitby—Baltic.

Captain Thomas Wellbank, who had captained Potton on a voyage for the EIC in 1815 to 1816, took command of Regret c. 1817.

EIC voyage (1820–1821): Captain Thomas Wellbank sailed from the Downs on 4 June 1820, bound for Bombay. Regret arrived at Bombay on 3 November. Homeward bound, she was at Tellicherry on 10 January 1821, and the Cape of Good Hope on 18 March. She reached St Helena on 9 April, and arrived at the Downs on 9 July.

On 6 March Regret was on her way to Batavia when a gale caused her to come into Portsmouth.

== Fate ==
During the evening of 23 September 1822 Regret was in Batavia Roads when a lighted candle set fire to a cask of spirits causing it to explode. The fire spread so rapidly the officers and crew could save nothing but the clothes they had on. She had landed most of her cargo but still had 30–40 tons of iron and some coal on board. The iron was mostly saved after the fire, but was much damaged. Regret's hull was towed on to a mud bank and the materials would be auctioned off.

Wellbank returned to England and was master of Potton again, including sailing her on another voyage for the EIC between 1823 and 1824.
