= HMS Lee (1814) =

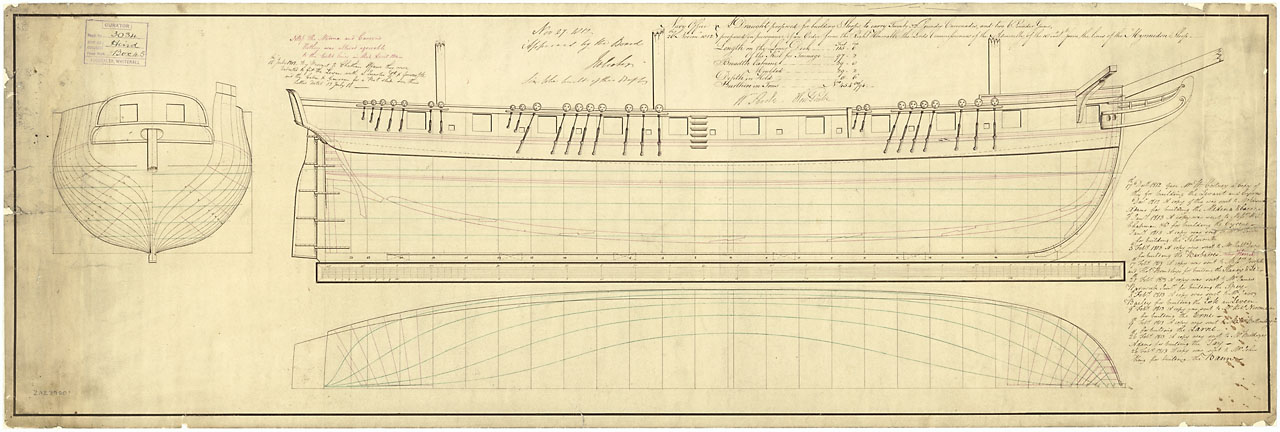
- Lee

History

United Kingdom
- Name: HMS Lee
- Ordered: 18 November 1812
- Builder: Josiah and Thomas Brindley, Frindsbury, Kent
- Laid down: March 1813
- Launched: 24 January 1814
- Commissioned: January 1815
- Fate: Broken up in May 1822

General characteristics
- Class & type: 20-gun Cyrus-class sixth-rate post ship
- Tons burthen: 462 73/94 (bm)
- Length: 115 ft 7 in (35.2 m) (gundeck); 96 ft 11 1/2 in (29.6 m) (keel)
- Beam: 29 ft 11 1/2 in (9.1 m)
- Depth of hold: 8 ft 6 in (2.59 m)
- Sail plan: Full-rigged ship
- Complement: 135
- Armament: 20 × 32-pounder carronades + 2 × 6-pounder chase guns

HMS Lee was a 20-gun Cyrus-class sixth-rate post ship of the Royal Navy built in 1814 by Josiah and Thomas Brindley, nephews to Lord Nelson, at one of their three yards in Frindsbury in Kent.

The Lee was first commissioned in January 1815 under Captain James Bremer. Following the end of the Napoleonic Wars, in August 1815 Captain John Pasco was given command of HMS Lee and was employed in the English Channel for the suppression of smuggling. He remained her captain until Lee was paid off in September 1818. Lee was retained in ordinary for another four years before she was sold for breaking up in May 1822.
