= HMS Tees (1817) =

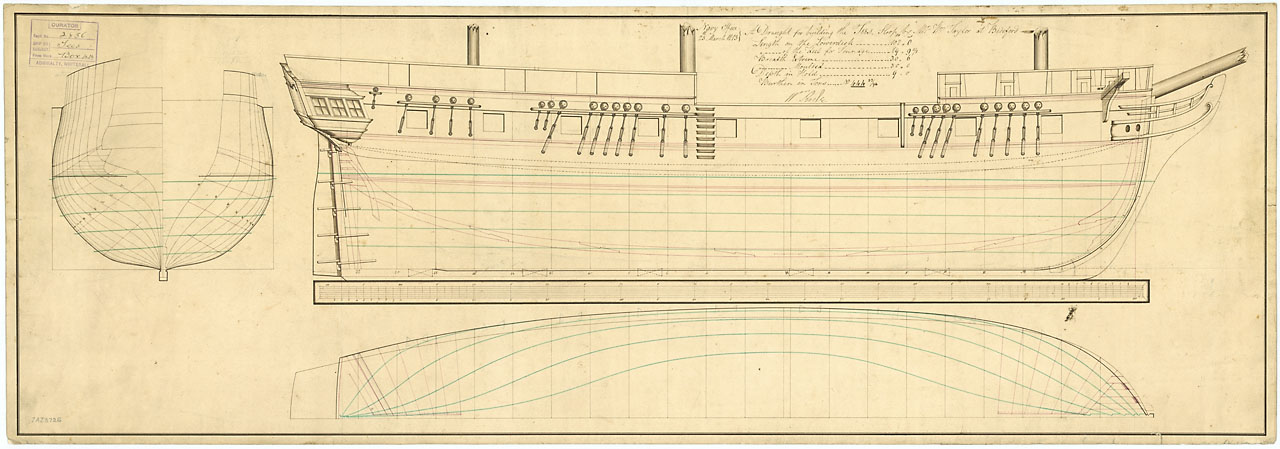
- Tees

History

United Kingdom
- Name: HMS Tees
- Builder: William Taylor, Bideford
- Laid down: October 1813
- Launched: 17 May 1817
- Commissioned: September 1818
- Decommissioned: 1827
- Fate: Sank in 1872

General characteristics
- Class & type: 28-gun sixth-rate Conway-class post ship
- Tons burthen: 450 bm
- Length: 108 ft 6 in (33.1 m) (gundeck); 90 ft 1.25 in (27.5 m) (keel)
- Beam: 30 ft 8 in (9.3 m)
- Depth of hold: 9 ft (2.74 m)
- Sail plan: Full-rigged ship
- Complement: 155
- Armament: 28 guns: UD: 18 × 32-pdrs carronades; QD: 6 × 12-pounder carronades; Fc: 2 × 12-pounder carronades; and 2 × 6-pdr chase guns

HMS Tees was a Conway-class 28-gun sixth rate post ship, launched in Bideford in 1817. She was used as the "Mariners' Church" permanently moored in St Georges Dock, Liverpool, from 1827 until she sank on 6 June 1872.

== Bibliography ==
- Rif Winfield. British Warships in the Age of Sail 1793–1817: Design, Construction, Careers and Fates. 2nd edition, Seaforth Publishing, 2008. ISBN 978-1-84415-717-4.
- Liverpool: Churches, in A History of the County of Lancaster: Volume 4, ed. William Farrer and J Brownbill (London, 1911), pp. 43–52. British History Online http://www.british-history.ac.uk/vch/lancs/vol4/pp43-52.
