= HMS Wye =

There have been five ships of the Royal Navy named HMS Wye, although only four were launched. The ships were named after the River Wye.

- HMS Wye (1814), a sixth-rate ship of the line of 24 guns, launched 1814 and broken up in 1852.
- HMS Wye (1855), a stores ship, previously Hecla and renamed in 1855. Sold 1866.
- HMS Wye (1873), a stores ship purchased in 1873 and sold in1906 to be broken up.
- HMS Wye (1919), a Admiralty W-class destroyer laid down in 1918 but cancelled before being launched.
- HMS Wye (1943), a River-class frigate launched in 1943 and sold in 1955 to be broken up.
