= Cyrus-class ship-sloop =

Class overview
- Name: Cyrus class
- Operators: Royal Navy
- Completed: 16

General characteristics
- Type: Sixth rate; (later rated as ship sloops)
- Tons burthen: 454 80/94 (as designed)
- Length: 115 ft 6 in (35.20 m) (gundeck); 97 ft 2 in (29.62 m) (keel)
- Beam: 29 ft 8 in (9.04 m)
- Depth of hold: 8 ft 6 in (2.59 m)
- Propulsion: Sail
- Sail plan: Full-rigged ship
- Complement: 135
- Armament: UD: 20 × 32-pounder carronades; and 2 × 6-pounder chase guns

The Cyrus-class sixth rates of the Royal Navy were a series of sixteen flush-decked sloops of war built to an 1812 design by Sir William Rule, the Surveyor of the Navy. The first nine ships of the class were launched in 1813 and the remaining seven in 1814. The vessels of the class served at the end of the Napoleonic War. They were built on the lines of HMS Hermes, which was based in turn on the French ship Bonne Citoyenne.

The Cyrus class was intended to be the counter to the new Frolic-class ship-rigged sloops that were under construction for the United States Navy. No encounter took place between any vessel of the Frolic class and one of the Cyrus class, but HMS Levant was captured by the American frigate USS Constitution.

With the re-organisation of the rating system which took place in the Royal Navy effective from 1 January 1817, the Cyrus-class flush-decked ships were re-classified as 20-gun sloops.

== Ships in class ==
| Name | Ordered | Builder | Laid down | Launched | Completed | Fate |
|---|---|---|---|---|---|---|
| Medina | 18 November 1812 | Edward Adams, Bucklers Hard | January 1813 | 13 August 1813 | 20 December 1813 at Portsmouth Dockyard | Sold to be broken up at Rotherhithe in 1832. |
| Cyrus | 18 November 1812 | William Courtney, Chester | January 1813 | 26 August 1813 | 11 March 1814 at Plymouth Dockyard | Sold to be broken up at Plymouth in 1823 |
| Levant | 18 November 1812 | William Courtney, Chester | January 1813 | 8 December 1813 | 22 April 1814 at Plymouth Dockyard | Broken up at Chatham in 1820 |
| Esk | 18 November 1812 | Jabez Bayley, Ipswich | March 1813 | 11 October 1813 | 14 June 1814 at Sheerness | Sold at Chatham in 1829 |
| Carron | 18 November 1812 | Edward Adams, Bucklers Hard | March 1813 | 9 November 1813 | 22 March 1814 at Portsmouth Dockyard | Wrecked near Puri, India in 1820 |
| Tay | 18 November 1812 | Balthazar Adams, Bucklers Hard | April 1813 | 26 November 1813 | 28 November 1814 at Portsmouth Dockyard (for sea) | Wrecked in the Gulf of Mexico in 1816 |
| Slaney | 18 November 1812 | Josiah & Thomas Brindley, Frindsbury | April 1813 | 9 December 1813 | 23 January 1815 at Chatham Dockyard (for sea) | Receiving ship in Bermuda in 1832, BU in 1838 |
| Erne | 18 November 1812 | Robert Newman, Dartmouth | March 1813 | 18 December 1813 | 30 March 1814 at Portsmouth Dockyard | Wrecked on Sal Island in 1819 |
| Leven | 18 November 1812 | Jabez Bayley, Ipswich | March 1813 | 23 December 1813 | 22 January 1815 at Sheerness (for sea) | Broken up at Deptford Dockyard in 1848 |
| Falmouth | 18 November 1812 | Richard Chapman, Bideford | April 1813 | 8 January 1814 | July 1815 at Plymouth Dockyard (for sea) | Sold for mercantile use (renamed Protector) in 1825 |
| Cyrene | 18 November 1812 | Richard Chapman, Bideford | April 1813 | 4 June 1814 | 12 October 1818 at Plymouth Dockyard (for sea) | Sold at Bombay in 1828 |
| Bann | 18 November 1812 | John King, Upnor | May 1813 | 8 January 1814 | 23 January 1815 at Chatham Dockyard (for sea) | Sold at Chatham in 1829 |
| Spey | 18 November 1812 | James Warwick, Eling, Southampton | May 1813 | 24 January 1814 | 7 February 1815 at Portsmouth Dockyard (for sea) | Sold at Chatham in 1822 |
| Lee | 18 November 1812 | Josiah & Thomas Brindley, Frindsbury | March 1813 | 24 January 1814 | January 1815 at Plymouth Dockyard (for sea) | Broken up at Plymouth Dockyard in 1822 |
| Hind | 18 November 1812 | Robert Davy, Topsham, Exeter | May 1813 | 8 March 1814 | 13 July 1819 Plymouth Dockyard (for sea) | Sold at Bombay in 1829 |
| Larne | 18 November 1812 | William Bottomley, King's Lynn | July 1813 | 8 March 1814 | 12 January 1815 Sheerness (for sea) | Sold for breaking up in 1828 |
