= HMS Mersey (1814) =

History

United Kingdom
- Name: HMS Mersey
- Ordered: 18 January 1813
- Builder: William Courtney, Chester
- Laid down: March 1813
- Launched: March 1814
- Commissioned: September 1818
- Fate: Broken up in July 1852

General characteristics
- Class & type: 20-gun sixth-rate Conway-class post ship
- Tons burthen: 44433/94 (bm)
- Length: 108 ft 6 in (33.1 m) (gundeck); 90 ft 1.25 in (27.5 m) (keel)
- Beam: 30 ft 8 in (9.3 m)
- Depth of hold: 9 ft (2.74 m)
- Sail plan: Full-rigged ship
- Complement: 155
- Armament: 20 guns: UD: 18 × 32-pdrs carronades; QD: 6 × 12-pounder carronades; Fc: 2 × 12-pounder carronades; and 2 × 6-pdr chase guns

The first HMS Mersey was a Conway-class 20-gun sixth-rate post ship, launched in 1814; she was re-rated as 26 guns in 1817. She was launched too late to see action in the Napoleonic War, though she nevertheless had a long and distinguished career that took her to Halifax Station in 1818 and then the South American station in 1824 until her departure in 1827, when she was then deployed to the Caribbean station from that year until 1831. She was eventually broken up in 1852.

== Sources ==
- Rif Winfield. British Warships in the Age of Sail 1793–1817: Design, Construction, Careers and Fates. 2nd edition, Seaforth Publishing, 2008. ISBN 978-1-84415-717-4.
