= Albion (1814 ship) =

History

United Kingdom
- Name: Albion
- Namesake: Albion
- Owner: J. Hunter
- Builder: J. Scott & Co., Calcutta
- Launched: 12 November 1814
- Fate: Wrecked January 1817

General characteristics
- Tons burthen: 790, or 81780/94, (bm)
- Propulsion: Sail
- Notes: Three decks

Albion was launched at Fort Gloucester, Calcutta, India, in 1814. She wrecked on 13 January 1817 off Trincomalee, while on her way from Madras to London. Her crew and passengers were rescued.

HMS Magicienne assisted in the rescue efforts. The officers of the Madras Establishment awarded Captain John Brett Purvis a silver plate worth £100 in recognition of his efforts.
