= Kent (1814 ship) =

History

United Kingdom
- Name: Kent
- Builder: John White, Chittagong
- Launched: 25 March 1814
- Fate: Last listed 1831

General characteristics
- Tons burthen: 414, or 421, or 44051/94, or 441, or 465 (bm)
- Length: 106 ft 10 in (32.6 m)
- Beam: 30 ft 6 in (9.3 m)
- Armament: 2 × 9-pounder carronades
- Notes: Teak-built

Kent was launched at Chittagong in 1814. Between 1814 and 1823, Kent sailed between India and Great Britain under a licence from the British East India Company (EIC). In 1823, she was sold in England. From then until she was last listed in 1831, she sailed between Liverpool and Africa.

== Career ==
In 1813, the EIC lost its monopoly on the trade between India and Britain. British ships were then free to sail between India or the Indian Ocean and Britain under a license from the EIC.

On 26 November 1814, Kent, Ambrose, master, arrived at Gravesend, from Bengal.

Kent, Baynes, sailed from Gravesend on 29 June 1815, bound for Fort William, India. On 7 October, she was at the Cape of Good Hope (the Cape). She had been boarded off Cape Verde by an armed vessel, believed to be a Carthaginian privateer. The schooner privateer had a burthen of 150–200 tons, was armed with 18 and 12-pounder guns, and had a crew of 25 men. Kent arrived at Bengal on 15 January 1816.

Kent first appeared in Lloyd's Register (LR) in 1815, and in the Register of Shipping (RS) in 1816.

Year	Master	Owner	Trade	Source
1815	Baynes		London–India	LR
1816	C.Baynes	Baynes	London–Isle de France	RS

Kent. Ireland, master, arrived at Gravesend on 23 September 1816, from Batavia. On 15 January 1817, she sailed from Deal for India. On 3 May, she was at the Cape; she sailed for Bengal on the 8th.

Year	Master	Owner	Trade	Source
1818	E.Ireland	Capt. & Co.	London–Bengal	LR

Kent appeared in the registry of Calcutta in 1819, with Farquharson, master, and Palmer & Co., owners.

Year	Master	Owner	Trade	Source
1820	E.Ireland	Capt. & Co.	London–Bengal	LR

Ken was sold in England in 1823.

Year	Master	Owner	Trade	Source
1823	E.Ireland; J.Crosby	Capt.& Co	London–Bengal	LR
1823	Crawford	J.Tobin	Liverpool–Africa	LR (supple. pages)

On 21 August 1825, Kent, Cummins, master, ran aground on the North Bank, in Liverpool Bay and was damaged. She was on a voyage from Liverpool to Africa. Kent was refloated and put back to Liverpool for repairs. She had been towed out by a steam tug in a fog when she ran aground.

Year	Master	Owner	Trade	Source
1826	Cummins	J.Tobin	Liverpool–Africa	LR
1829	Cummins; W.Roberts	J.Tobin	Liverpool–Africa	LR
1831	W.Roberts	J.Tobin &Co.	Liverpool–Africa	LR

In July 1828, Kent, Cummins, master, returned to Liverpool with 1400 casks of palm oil, 379 elephant teeth (ivory tusks), 700 billets of redwood, and 10 fathoms of dunnage wood.

== Fate ==
LR last listed Kent in 1831.
