= Potton (1814 ship) =

History

United Kingdom
- Name: Potton
- Namesake: Potton, or possibly Potton Island
- Owner: 1814:John Barkworth; 1825:Thomas Barkworth
- Builder: Barkworth & Hawkes, Hessle, Hull
- Launched: 6 December 1814
- Fate: Foundered 1829

General characteristics
- Tons burthen: 39161/94, or 396 (bm)
- Length: 111 ft 0 in (33.8 m)
- Beam: 28 ft 10 in (8.8 m)
- Propulsion: Sail
- Armament: 10 × 6-pounder guns

Potton was launched in 1814 and shortly thereafter made one of two voyages under charter to the British East India Company (EIC). Between voyages for the EIC and after she was a general trader until she foundered in 1829.

== Career ==
Potton enters the Register of Shipping in 1815 with Fairburn, master, changing to Welbank. Her trade was Hull—London, changing to Hull—Bengal.

EIC voyage #1 (1815–1816): Captain Thomas Wellbank sailed from the Downs on 22 May 1815, bound for Bengal. Potton left Calcutta on 8 May 1816 and on 25 May was at Saugor. She reached the Cape of Good Hope on 11 August and St Helena on 8 September. She arrived at the Downs on 17 November.

In 1817 Welbank sailed Potton to India under a license from the EIC. The information in the tables below is from the Register of Shipping.

Year	Master	Owner	Trade
1818	Welbank; Scott	Barkworth	London—India
1819	Scott	Barkworth	London—India
1820	Sughrue	Barkworth	London—Jamaica
1821	Sughrue; Richter	Barkworth	London—Jamaica
1822	Richeter; Bacon	Barkworth	London—Jamaica; London—Quebec
1823	Bacon	Barkworth	London—Quebec

Wellbank had left Potton to sail Regret for the Barricks. He sailed to the East Indies and made one voyage for the EIC in 1820–21. A fire destroyed Regret in September 1822 at Batavia Roads and Wellbank returned to England and again became master of Potton.

EIC voyage #2 (1823–1824): Captain Wellbank sailed from the Downs on 25 May 1823, bound for Bengal. On 21 September she and Atlas, Clifton, master, ran onshore in Hog River Creek, which is a point on the Hooghli River between Kidderpore and Kedgeree. It was feared both would be lost. However, Potton was got off with little damage, though she was still there on 25 September. She had part of the EIC's mint on board.

Potton arrived at Calcutta on 17 October. Homeward bound, she was at Kedgeree on 14 February and Saugor on 27 February. She reached the Cape on 10 May. On 23 May officers and men from HMS Tamar came to her assistance after a gale the previous night damaged her anchor and almost drove her onshore. Potton, Neptune, and Lady Campbell sailed for England on 28 May. Potton reached St Helena on 13 June, (Note: The British Library's summary of her records gives her arrival at St Helena as 13 "Jan 1825", but this is clearly a mis-transcription for June.) and arrived at the Downs on 16 August.

Year	Master	Owner	Trade
1825	Wellbank	Barkworth	London—Calcutta
1826	Wellbank; Higton	Barkworth	London—Calcutta; London-Sierra Leone
1827	Higton	Barkworth	London-Sierra Leone
1828	Higton	Barkworth	London-Sierra Leone
1829	Higton	Barkworth	London-Sierra Leone

== Fate ==
Potton foundered on 20 March 1829 off the Isle of Flores, Azores, as she was sailing from Sierra Leone to London. Potton had left Sierra Leone on 2 February but heavy gales around the middle of March left her waterlogged and sinking near the Western Islands (Azores). Passengers and crew took to her boats as she foundered and were able to reach land on the 20th. On the 29th Falcon, Littleworth, master, took the survivors and arrived at Dover on 18 June. (Note: Falcon, of 82 tons (bm), Littleworth, master and owner, was a former prize.)
