= Susanna Ann (1823 ship) =

History

United Kingdom
- Name: Susanna Ann
- Acquired: 1823
- Fate: Wrecked 19 March 1847

General characteristics
- Tons burthen: 79 (bm)
- Sail plan: Smack, and later schooner

Susanna Ann (or Susannah Ann, or Susannah Anne). was a smack launched at Bridport or Cowes in 1814, almost surely under another name. Between 1823 and 1833 she made six voyages as a whaler and sealer in the British southern whale fishery. From around 1834 on she traded with Africa, and then in 1838 she sailed to New South Wales (NSW). She moved her registry to NSW and traded between east coast Australian ports and with New Zealand until she was wrecked on 20 March 1847.

== Career ==
Susanna Ann first appeared in Lloyd's Register (LR) in 1823.

Year	Master	Owner	Trade	Source
1823	Brown	Captain & Company	London–South Seas	LR

News of the discovery of the South Shetland Islands and a new sealing ground there had just reached England and so a number of owners sent vessels to the region to exploit the opportunity.

1st voyage (1823–1825): Captain Brown sailed from London on 12 September 1823, bound for the Falkland Islands. She carried three apprentices from the Marine Society, who all deserted when she reached Buenos Aires. (Susanna Ann was quite small, and uncomfortable.) On 12 August 1824 she arrived at Buenos Aires from the Falklands, under the command of Captain Robertson; Brown had apparently died. On 5 October she arrived at Buenos Aires again, this time from Patagonia.

Susanna Ann returned to London on 26 June 1825, with 20 casks of oil, and 3,700 or 4,423 seal skins. Other records show that she had two tons of train oil for J. Lucas, and 74 tons of sperm oil for William Mellish.

2nd voyage (1825–1826): Captain Robert Ferguson sailed from London in 1825. In December 1825 Susannah Ann, Camden, and Dove were off the coast of Patagonia. (Note: In March 1826 Camden was wrecked on the coast of Patagonia. Dove rescued her crew.) Susanna Ann returned to London on 12 September 1827 with 3,320 seal skins. She was also carrying 150 tons of sperm oil from the South Seas for Donaldson & Co.

3rd voyage (1827–1828): Captain Ferguson sailed from London on 16 October 1827. Susanna Ann returned to London on 8 July 1828, with 3,900 seal skins.

4th voyage (1828–1830): Captain Ferguson sailed from London in 1828. Susanna Ann returned to London on 14 May 1830, with 4,900 seal skins.

5th voyage (1830–1832): Captain Ferguson sailed from London on 17 August 1830. Susanna Ann returned to London on 21 August 1832 with 1780 seal skins. That year, while in the Falklands, Captain Ferguson shot some tame mares, sheep, and hogs belonging to Mr. Luis Vernet, to whom the United Provinces of the River Plate had granted all of East Falkland, together with exclusive fishing and sealing rights.

6th voyage (1832–c.1834): Captain Ferguson sailed on 13 November 1832. In March/April 1833, Britain took over the Falkland Islands. On 26 August 1833, "five Indian convicts and three gauchos" murdered Captain Matthew Brisbane at Port Louis, Falkland Islands, angry at his attempts to protect Vernet's property in Vernet's absence. The gang also murdered four other men at the same time. Challenger rescued the surviving Europeans. Ferguson took advantage of the situation, taking all the seal skins that Brisbane had stored up. Susanna Ann returned to London on 28 April 1835. After she returned, she left sealing.

Year	Master	Owner	Trade	Source
1835	Ferguson; Gaynor (or Gaymer)	T.Brown	London–Africa	LR; small repairs 1825
1838	Gaynor	Street	London–New South Wales	LR; small repairs 1825 & large repair 1838

Susanna Ann arrived in Sydney and there in January 1839 she was offered for sale, freight, or charter. She proceeded to sail between Australia and New Zealand. In 1847 she was listed among the vessels belonging to Sydney.

== Loss ==
On 19 March 1847 Susannah Ann was attempting to leave Queen Charlotte's Sound with a cargo of spars. She was driven ashore and wrecked. All aboard were saved, as was some of her cargo.
