= Timandra (1814 ship) =

History

United Kingdom
- Name: Timandra
- Namesake: Timandra
- Owner: 1814:W. Gibbon; 1821:John Dingwall
- Builder: Robert Gibbons & the Sons of John Dingwall, Aberdeen
- Fate: Foundered September 1822

General characteristics
- Tons burthen: 36585/94 or 367, or 467(bm)
- Length: 101 ft 4 in (30.9 m)
- Beam: 29 ft 2 in (8.9 m)
- Propulsion: Sail

Timandra was launched in 1814. She started trading with India and made one voyage for the British East India Company (EIC) before she was lost off the Lofoten Islands in 1822.

== Career ==
Timandra quickly began trading with the India and South East Asia under a license from the EIC. She first appeared in the Register of Shipping in 1816.

Year	Master	Owner	Trade	Source
1816	Cattanick	Gibbon & Co.	London—Bombay	Register of Shipping
1818	Cattanick; Baigrie	Gibbon & Co. Dingwell	London—Bombay; London—Batavia	Register of Shipping
1819	Baigrie	Dingwell	London—Batavia	Register of Shipping
1820	Baigre	Dingwell	London—Batavia	Register of Shipping
1821	Price	Dingwell	Liverpool-Bengal	Register of Shipping

EIC voyage (1820-1821): Captain John Price sailed from Falmouth on 19 July 1820, bound for Bengal. Timandra arrived at Calcutta on 31 January 1821. Homeward bound, she passed Saugor on 3 April, reached Saint Helena on 19 July, and arrived at the Downs on 10 September.

On her return Timandra's master changed from Price to E. Marshall, her owner from Dingwell to J. Benson, and her trade from Liverpool—Bengal to London—Baltic.

== Loss ==
Timandra sprang a leak in the Norwegian Sea 80 miles (130 km) off Lofoten, Norway, on 6 September 1822; despite their efforts the crew could not keep her afloat. Her crew took to their boats and arrived at Bodø three days later. The mate and seven men arrived at Trondheim on 27 September. The master and six men stayed at Bodø. She was on a voyage from Arkhangelsk, Russia to London.
