= HMS Tamar (1814) =

Conway-class ship of the Royal Navy

History

United Kingdom
- Name: Tamar
- Namesake: River Tamar
- Ordered: 18 January 1813
- Builder: Josiah & Thomas Brindley, Frindsbury
- Laid down: May 1813
- Launched: 23 March 1814
- Completed: 5 November 1814
- Fate: Sold in 1837

General characteristics
- Class & type: Conway-class post ship
- Tons burthen: 45083/94 (bm)
- Length: 108 ft 0 1/2 in (32.9 m) (gundeck); 89 ft 7 3/4 in (27.3 m) (keel)
- Beam: 30 ft 9 in (9.4 m)
- Depth of hold: 9 ft 0 3/4 in (2.8 m)
- Sail plan: Full-rigged ship
- Complement: 155
- Armament: 20 guns (from 1817, 28 guns): Upper deck: 18 × 32-pounder carronades; QD: 6 × 12-pounder carronades; Fc: 2 × 12-pounder carronades and 2 × 6-pounder guns

HMS Tamar was a 26-gun Conway-class post-ship launched in 1814, converted into a coal hulk in 1831 at Plymouth, and sold in 1837.

Josiah & Thomas Brindley launched Tamar at Frindsbury in 1814. She arrived in Halifax, after 75 men died of fever, including Captain Arthur Stowe. She was driven ashore on the coast of Labrador, British North America, in early August 1819, but later was refloated. Under the command of Captain George Richard Pechell, she captured a large pirate brig near San Domingo in 1820. She was part of the failed settlement on Melville Island at Fort Dundas in the Gulf of Carpentaria.

On 3 March 1821 Tamar came into Kingston, Jamaica, with the brigantine Jupiter. Tamar had detained Jupiter in the Mona Passage on 23 May after a long chase. Jupiter, of eight guns and 190 men, was flying the Buenos Ayrean flag and did not surrender until Tamar had fired several shots into her that killed one man and wounded another, and that severely damaged her rigging. A few days later Tamar sailed for Savanilla with Jupiter.

== Fate ==
Tamar was converted to a coal hulk in 1831, based at Plymouth. She was sold in 1837.
