= Oscar (1814 ship) =

Ship launched 1814, condemned 1828

History

United Kingdom
- Name: Oscar
- Builder: Sunderland
- Launched: 1814
- Fate: Condemned 1828

General characteristics
- Tons burthen: 293, or 294, or 298 (bm)

Oscar was launched at Sunderland in 1814. From about 1825 she started trading with the Cape of Good Hope (CGH) and eastward. In 1828 she was returning from Batavia when she had to put back there leaky. She was condemned there.

== Career ==
Oscar first appeared in the Register of Shipping (RS) in 1814 with G.Booth, master, Booth & Co., owner, and trade Sunderland–London.

| Year | Master | Owner | Trade | Source & notes |
|---|---|---|---|---|
| 1815 | Ward | Brugh | London | RS |
| 1820 | Elsworthy | Foster | London–St Johns | RS |
| 1825 | Briggs; Stewart | Foster | London–CGH | RS; large repair 1824 |

Lloyd's List for 1828 showed Oscar with W.Stewart, master, M.Foster, master, and trade London–Île de France.

== Fate ==
Lloyd's List reported on 5 February 1828 that Oscar, Steward, master, had been put back to Batavia leaky and had been condemned there.
