= Conway-class post ship =

Royal Navy post ship class

Class overview
- Name: Conway-class post ships
- Operators: Royal Navy
- Completed: 10

General characteristics
- Type: Sixth-rate post ship
- Tons burthen: 444 33/94 (as designed)
- Length: 108 ft (33 m) (gundeck); 89 ft 9.625 in (27.37168 m) (keel)
- Beam: 30 ft 6 in (9.30 m)
- Depth: 9 ft (2.7 m)
- Sail plan: Full-rigged ship
- Complement: 155
- Armament: 20 guns (from 1817, 28 guns): Upper Deck: 18 × 32-pounder carronades; Quarterdeck: 6 × 12-pounder carronades; Forecasle: 2 × 12-pounder carronades and 2 × 6-pounder guns

The Conway class sailing sixth rates were a series of ten Royal Navy post ships built to an 1812 design by Sir William Rule. All ten were ordered on 18 January 1812, and nine of these were launched during 1814, at the end of the Napoleonic War; the last (Tees) was delayed and was launched in 1817.

These ships were originally designated as "sloops", but were nominally rated as sixth rates of 20 guns when built, as their 12-pounder carronades were not included in the official rating. When this changed in February 1817, they were rated at 28 guns.

== Ships in class ==
- HMS Mersey
  - Builder: William Courtney, Chester
  - Laid down: March 1813
  - Launched: March 1814
  - Completed: 26 April 1814 at Plymouth Dockyard
  - Fate: Broken up at Portsmouth in 1852.
- HMS Eden
  - Builder: William Courtney, Chester
  - Laid down: March 1813
  - Launched: 19 May 1814
  - Completed: 20 June 1814
  - Fate: Broken up at Portsmouth in 1833.
- HMS Conway
  - Builder: John Pelham, Frindsbury
  - Laid down: May 1813
  - Launched: 10 March 1814
  - Completed: 7 November 1814
  - Fate: Sold in 1825; became the merchantman and whaler Toward Castle and was wrecked in 1838
- HMS Tamar
  - Builder: Josiah & Thomas Brindley, Frindsbury
  - Laid down: May 1813
  - Launched: 23 March 1814
  - Completed: 5 November 1814
  - Fate: Sold in 1837.
- HMS Dee
  - Builder: Jabez Bayley, Ipswich
  - Laid down: May 1813
  - Launched: 5 May 1814
  - Completed: 29 October 1814
  - Fate: Sold in 1819.
- HMS Towey
  - Builder: Balthazar Adams, Bucklers Hard
  - Laid down: May 1813
  - Launched: 6 May 1814
  - Completed: 6 December 1814
  - Fate: Broken up at Plymouth in 1822.
- HMS Menai
  - Builder: Josiah & Thomas Brindley, Frindsbury
  - Laid down: June 1813
  - Launched: 5 April 1814
  - Completed: 8 December 1814
  - Fate: Broken up in 1853.
- HMS Tyne
  - Builder: Robert Davy, Topsham, Exeter
  - Laid down: August 1813
  - Launched: 20 May 1814
  - Completed: 9 November 1814
  - Fate: Sold in 1825.
- HMS Wye
  - Builder: Benjamin Hobbs & George Hellyer, Redbridge, Southampton
  - Laid down: September 1813
  - Launched: 17 August 1814
  - Completed: 10 July 1815
  - Fate: Broken up at Deptford in 1852.
- HMS Tees
  - Builder: William Taylor, Bideford
  - Laid down: October 1813
  - Launched: 17 May 1817
  - Completed: 30 May 1818
  - Fate: Sold in 1872.
