= McDonough =

- Language: Irish

Origin
- Meaning: Brown Warrior
- Region of origin: Ireland

Other names
- Variant forms: MacDonough, McDonnough, MacDonogh, McDonogh, MacDonagh, McDonagh, McDonaugh, McDonnaugh, Mcdonnaeug

McDonough is an Irish surname.

== Origins and variants ==
The surname is an Anglicized form of the Gaelic name "Mac Donnchadha", which means son of Donnchadh or son of Donough. The name itself consists of elements meaning "brown (donn)" or Donn “the dark one”, plus "battle (chatha)".

Various unrelated clans carrying this surname existed in Ireland, at least two in Connacht: these MacDonnchadhas were a branch of the MacDermots, the kings of Moylurg. Another McDonough clan were cadets of the O'Flaherty chiefs in Iar Connacht.

The second clan in Munster, whose chiefs held the Castle of Kanturk in County Cork, and who were known as the bards of Duhallow, were a branch of the MacCarthys going by McDonough. The name is now rare in Cork, with some of the original name holders, it is believed, changing their name to MacCarthy, although some with the original name still remain in Munster.

One explanation for the many spelling variations is that scribes and church officials frequently spelled the name as it sounded: an imprecise method at best. Understandably then, various spellings of the surname McDonough were found in the many archives researched including MacDonough, McDonogh, and many more.

== Notable people with the surname ==
- Adam McDonough (born 1985), American mixed martial artist
- Aidan McDonough (born 1999), American ice hockey player
- Al McDonough, Canadian ice hockey player
- Alexa McDonough, Canadian politician
- Ann M. McDonough (1915-1995), member of the Military Intelligence Hall of Fame
- Ann Patrice McDonough, American figure skater
- Arthur Edward McDonogh, (c. 1810 – 1852), New Zealand policeman, police magistrate, militia officer and roading supervisor.
- Brendan McDonough, American soccer player
- Blair McDonough, Australian actor
- Bob McDonogh, American racecar driver
- Brian McDonough, American physician and writer
- Bridget McDonough, American businesswoman
- David McDonough, New York Assemblyman
- Darron McDonough, English footballer
- Declan McDonogh, Irish jockey who competes in Flat racing
- Denis McDonough, US Secretary of Veterans Affairs under President Joe Biden; White House Chief of Staff, Deputy National Security Advisor and National Security Council Chief of Staff under President Barack Obama.
- Eileen McDonough (1962–2012), American child actress
- Elizabeth MacDonough, Parliamentarian of the United States Senate
- Frank McDonough, British historian of 20th-century Germany
- Fred McDonogh, Irish politician
- Gabe McDonough, Canadian record producer who is the vice president music director at Leo Burnett USA
- George Macdonogh, British Army general officer.
- Giles MacDonogh (born 1955), British writer, historian and translator
- Glen MacDonough (1870–1924), US American writer, lyricist and librettist
- Gordon L. McDonough, U.S. Representative from California
- Guy McDonough, Australian rock musician
- Harry Macdonough, Canadian singer and recording executive
- Hubie McDonough, American ice hockey player
- Jack McDonough, Australian rules footballer who played with South Melbourne and Fitzroy in the VFL during the early 1900s
- Jake McDonough, American football defensive end
- James MacDonough (born 1970), American bass guitarist
- James McDonogh, Irish first-class cricketer
- Jenny McDonough, field hockey forward who plays for Ireland
- Jimmy McDonough, American journalist and biographer
- John McDonogh (1779-1850), United States entrepreneur and philanthropist, founder and namesake of McDonoghville Louisiana
- John McDonogh (hurler) (1941–2012), Irish hurler who played as full-back for the Limerick senior team
- John McDonough (piper), Irish piper from County Galway
- John McDonough (Savannah mayor), politician and businessman from Georgia, US
- John McDonough (sports executive) (born 1953), former president of the Chicago Blackhawks ice hockey team
- John E. McDonough (born 1953), professor of public health at the Harvard School of Public Health
- John J. McDonough (Massachusetts politician), American politician who served as a member of the Boston School Committee from 1966 to 1968 and again from 1972 to 1982
- John J. McDonough (mayor), mayor of St. Paul, Minnesota
- John P. McDonough (politician), American politician from Maryland
- John T. McDonough, Irish born-American lawyer and politician
- Kiki McDonough, British jewellery designer
- Martin McDonogh (1860–1934), Irish politician
- Martin McDonagh, British-Irish playwright and filmmaker
- Marie McDonough (1917–2013), Australian cricketer
- Mary Elizabeth McDonough, American actress
- Mary ("Polly") McDonough (1783–1856), mother of Andrew Johnson, the 17th President of the United States
- Matthew McDonough, drummer for American heavy metal band Mudvayne
- Megon McDonough, American folk/cabaret singer/songwriter
- Neal McDonough, American actor
- Pat McDonough, US Maryland politician
- Patrick MacDonogh (1902–1961), Irish poet
- Patrick McDonough (cyclist) (born 1961), American track cyclist
- Patrick F. McDonough (fl. 1956–2001), Irish-American police officer, attorney, and politician
- Patrick J. McDonough (1911–1980), American politician from Massachusetts
- Paul McDonough (disambiguation), several people
- Pete McDonough, San Francisco bail bondsman
- Peter J. McDonough (1925–1998), American Republican Party politician from New Jersey
- R. C. McDonough (1924–2018), Justice of the Montana Supreme Court
- Roger I. McDonough, American judge, served on the Utah Supreme Court from 1938 to 1966
- Roy McDonough, English football player and manager who holds the record for red cards in the English professional game
- Ryan McDonough (disambiguation), several people
- Sean McDonough, American television sportscaster
- Sean Daniel (basketball) (born 1989), Israeli basketball player
- Suzanne Clarke McDonough, American journalist, documentary filmmaker
- Thomas Macdonough, 19th-century American naval officer
- Will McDonough, American sportswriter for the Boston Globe
- William McDonough, American architect and author
- William Joseph McDonough, Federal Reserve Bank of New York chairman

== Given name ==
- Macdonough Craven, (1858–1919), American naval officer, engineer, and politician
- Tunis Augustus Macdonough Craven (1813–1864), officer in the United States Navy

== Fictional characters ==
- Alex McDonough, lawyer in the film I Now Pronounce You Chuck & Larry, portrayed by Jessica Biel.
- Blane McDonnagh, a popular kid from a wealthy family in the film "Pretty in Pink". He falls for the protagonist, Andie (Molly Ringwald), portrayed by Andrew McCarthy.
- Declan McDonough, spoiled rich kid and high school basketball star in the American science fiction television series Kyle XY, portrayed by Chris Olivero.
- H.I. "Hi" McDunnough, portrayed by Nicolas Cage in the film Raising Arizona.
- Jefferson "Seaplane" McDonough, pilot in the film Jumanji: Welcome to the Jungle and its sequel, portrayed by Nick Jonas.
- Detective Sergeant McDonough, police detective in the film Criminally Insane portrayed by George Buck Flower.
- Detective McDonough, police detective in the film Devil's Knot, portrayed by Brian Howe.
