= MacDonough =

MacDonough is an Irish surname, it may refer to:

== Surname ==
- Elizabeth MacDonough, the current Parliamentarian of the United States Senate
- George MacDonough or George Macdonogh GBE KCB KCMG (1865–1942), British Army general officer
- Glen MacDonough (1870–1924), US American writer, lyricist and librettist
- Harry Macdonough (1871–1931), Canadian singer and recording executive
- James MacDonough (born 1970) American professional bass guitarist
- Thomas Macdonough (1783–1825), early-19th-century American naval officer noted for his roles in the first Barbary War and the War of 1812

== Given name ==
- Macdonough Craven, (1858–1919), American naval officer, engineer, and politician
- Tunis Augustus Macdonough Craven (1813–1864), officer in the United States Navy

== Places ==
- MacDonough, Delaware, a small unincorporated community in New Castle County, Delaware, United States
- MacDonough Island, a large island in the Possession Sound portion of Puget Sound, located in Island County, Washington
- Commodore Thomas MacDonough Highway, State Route 314 (New York–Vermont) (NY 314) and Vermont Route 314 (VT 314)
- Comdr. Thomas MacDonough House, a historic home located near Odessa, New Castle County, Delaware

== Ships ==
- USS Macdonough (DD-331), Clemson-class destroyer built for the United States Navy during World War I
- USS Macdonough (DD-351), Farragut-class destroyer in the United States Navy during World War II
- USS Macdonough (DD-9), Lawrence-class destroyer, which was a sub-class of Bainbridge-class destroyer, in the United States Navy
- USS Macdonough (DDG-39), Farragut class guided missile destroyer in the United States Navy

== See also ==
- McDonough
