= John McDonagh =

John McDonagh may refer to:

- John Michael McDonagh (born 1967), screenwriter and film director with British and Irish nationality
- John MacDonagh (1880–1961), Irish film director, playwright and republican
- John McDonagh (cricketer), South African cricketer

== See also ==
- John McDonough (disambiguation)
- John McDonogh
- John McDonogh (hurler)
