= 1955 Limerick Senior Hurling Championship =

Annual hurling competition season

- Teams: 14
- Champions: Ahane (16th title); Dick Leonard (captain)
- Runners-up: Geraldines

Tournament statistics
- Matches played: 19

The 1955 Limerick Senior Hurling Championship was the 61st staging of the Limerick Senior Hurling Championship since its establishment by the Limerick County Board in 1887.

Cappamore were the defending champions.

Ahane won the championship after a 4–04 to 2–02 defeat of Geraldines in the final. It was their 16th championship and first title since 1948.

== Results ==
=== Semi-finals ===
24 July 1955 Semi-final	Ahane	2–09 – 2–07	Treaty Sarsfields	Gaelic Grounds

4 September 1955 Semi-final	Geraldines	5–07 – 1–03	Emmets	Gaelic Grounds

=== Final ===
18 September 1955 Final	Ahane	4–04 – 2–02	Geraldines	Gaelic Grounds
	J Power 3–0, P Enright 1–0, Keane 0–1, Leonard 0–1, Houlihan 0–1, O'Brien 0–1.		Sheehan 1–2, O'Connor 1–0.
