= 1954 Limerick Senior Hurling Championship =

Annual hurling competition season

- Champions: Cappamore (2nd title)
- Runners-up: Western Gaels

The 1954 Limerick Senior Hurling Championship was the 60th staging of the Limerick Senior Hurling Championship since its establishment by the Limerick County Board in 1887.

Treaty Sarsfields were the defending champions.

Cappamore won the championship after a 2–11 to 3–05 defeat of Western Gaels in the final. It was their second championship title overall and their first title in fifty years.

== Championship statistics ==
=== Miscellaneous ===
- Cappamore end an 50-year gap to win the first time since 1904.
