= Bridget Kenny =

Irish fiddle player

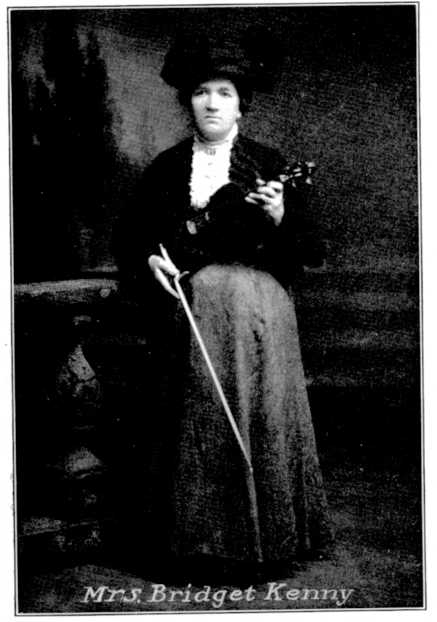
- Kenny holding her fiddle
- Born: 1855-1857
- Died: 1915
- Title: The Queen of Irish Fiddlers
- Spouse: John Kenny
- Children: 13
- Father: John McDonough

Bridget Kenny (c. 1855-1915) was an Irish violinist known as "the Queen of Irish Fiddlers." She began playing the fiddle when she was seven years old, and is mentioned in Francis O'Neill's Irish Minstrels and Musicians, a collection of important traditional Irish musicians. Her father was John McDonough who was also a famous Irish piper, and later married John Kenny, who was also a piper.

== Biography ==
Bridget Kenny's father, John McDonough, died when she was "less than two years old." She was born to a poor rural family with at least two other siblings named Mary Anne and John McDonough. She began playing the fiddle at seven years old and first played in the streets of old Dublin.

She later married John Kenny, who was a well-known piper, and together they had 13 children. Together, Kenny and her husband played at concerts and "their joint collection of unpublished Irish music has been awarded a prize on three different occasions." Some of their children also lived to become successful musicians who were nearly as good as Kenny herself.

One of Kenny's daughters was married by John Flannagan who was another famous Irish piper.

== Career ==
In 1907, Kenny played at a Gaelic Revival concert but was booed off of the stage because she had played at the Irish International Exhibition some years before. Before 1907, the exhibition only focused on Irish and Celtic culture, but William Martin Murphy, who owned the newspaper the Irish Independent at the time, changed it to become more international and industrial.

Kenny won first prize at the annual Feiseanna "year after year," and it was this what won her the title "The Queen of Irish Fiddlers."

== See also ==
Musicians:

- John McDonough, Bridget Kenny's father and famous piper
- Francis O'Neill, Irish musician, captain, and collector of Irish folk music
- Isabella Rudkin
- Bettina Walker
- Edith Best, one founder of the Gaelic Revival concert Feis Ceoil

History:

- Feis Ceoil
- Gaelic Revival
- Irish Famine
