= William McDonough (disambiguation) =

William McDonough may refer to:

- William McDonough, American architect
- William Joseph McDonough (1934–2018), Federal Reserve Bank of New York chairman
- William McDonough (jockey), took part in four Grand Nationals in the 1830s and 40s
