= 1947 Limerick Senior Hurling Championship =

Annual hurling competition season

- Champions: Ahane (14th title); Jackie Power (captain)
- Runners-up: St Patrick's

The 1947 Limerick Senior Hurling Championship was the 53rd staging of the Limerick Senior Hurling Championship since its establishment by the Limerick County Board.

Ahane were the defending champions.

On 14 September 1947, Ahane won the championship after a 5–06 to 1–05 defeat of St. Patrick's in the final. It was their 14th championship title overall and their sixth title in succession.

== Results ==
=== Final ===
14 September 1947 Final	Ahane	5–06 – 1–05	St. Patrick's	Gaelic Grounds, Limerick
