= 1949 Limerick Senior Hurling Championship =

Annual hurling competition season

- Champions: St. Patrick's (1st title); Paddy Fitzgerald (captain)
- Runners-up: Geraldines

The 1949 Limerick Senior Hurling Championship was the 55th staging of the Limerick Senior Hurling Championship since its establishment by the Limerick County Board.

Ahane were the defending champions.

St. Patrick's won the championship after a 1–07 to 1–03 defeat of Geraldines in the final. It was their first ever championship title.
