= Antigo (YTB-792) =

Tugboat of the United States Navy

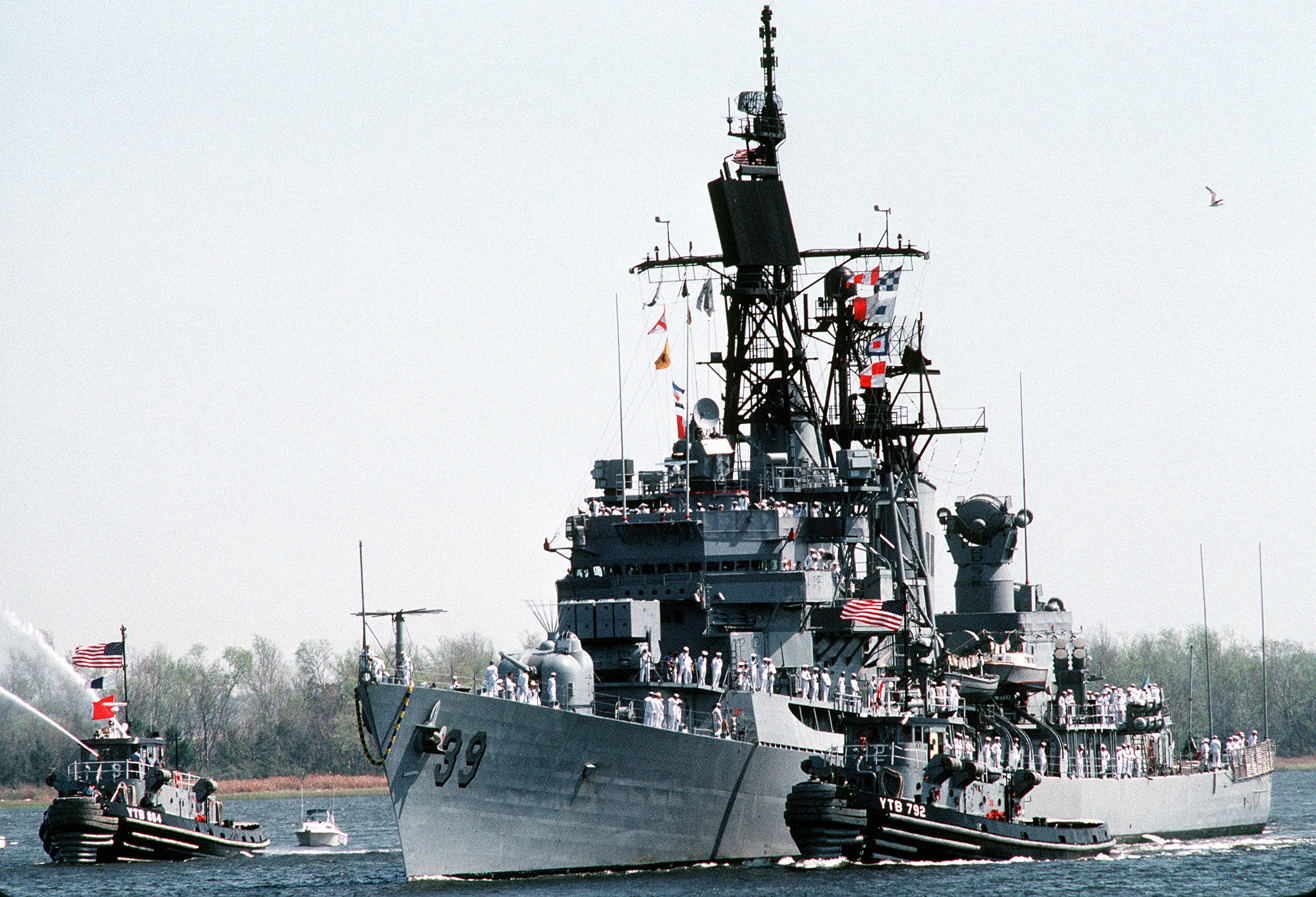
- Ahoskie (YTB-804), left, sprays streams of water into the air as Antigo comes alongside the guided-missile destroyer USS Macdonough (DDG-39) to escort her up the Cooper River to Naval Station Charleston, South Carolina, 22 March 1991.

History

United States
- Ordered: 16 June 1966
- Builder: Marinette Marine, Marinette, Wisconsin
- Laid down: 27 September 1966
- Launched: 18 April 1967
- Acquired: 10 July 1967
- Stricken: 25 June 1999
- Identification: IMO number: 8980880; MMSI number: 366857410; Callsign: WDA8725
- Fate: Sold by GSA for commercial service, 17 May 2000, to McAllister Towing, renamed Donal G. McAllister

General characteristics
- Class & type: Natick-class large harbor tug
- Displacement: 283 long tons (288 t) (light); 356 long tons (362 t) (full)
- Length: 109 ft (33 m)
- Beam: 31 ft (9.4 m)
- Draft: 14 ft (4.3 m)
- Speed: 12 knots (14 mph; 22 km/h)
- Complement: 12
- Armament: None

Antigo (YTB-792) was a United States Navy Natick-class large harbor tug named for Antigo, Wisconsin. She is the second ship to bear the name.

== Construction ==
The contract for Antigo was awarded 16 June 1966. She was laid down on 27 September 1966 at Marinette, Wisconsin, by Marinette Marine and launched 18 April 1967.

== Operational history ==
The second USS Antigo (YTB-792) was laid down on 27 September 1966 at Marinette, Wisconsin, by the Marinette Marine Corp.; launched on 18 April 1967; completed in July 1967; and placed in service soon thereafter.

Assigned to the 6th Naval District and based at Charleston, South Carolina, Antigo spent her entire Navy career providing towing and other support services for ships visiting Charleston.

Stricken from the Navy Directory 25 June 1999 she was sold through the General Services Administration (GSA) for reuse 17 May 2000. Currently in civilian service as Donal G. McAllister.
