= Closer (play) =

1997 play by English playwright Patrick Marber

- Cover art, First edition, Methuen Drama
- Original language: English
- Written by: Patrick Marber
- Characters: Dan; Alice (Jane Jones); Anna; Larry
- Subject: A quartet of strangers in a sexual square dance in which partners are constantly swapped, caught between desire and betrayal.
- Genre: Drama, melodrama
- Setting: London, 1990s

Premiere
- Date: 22 May 1997
- Place: Cottesloe Theatre; London

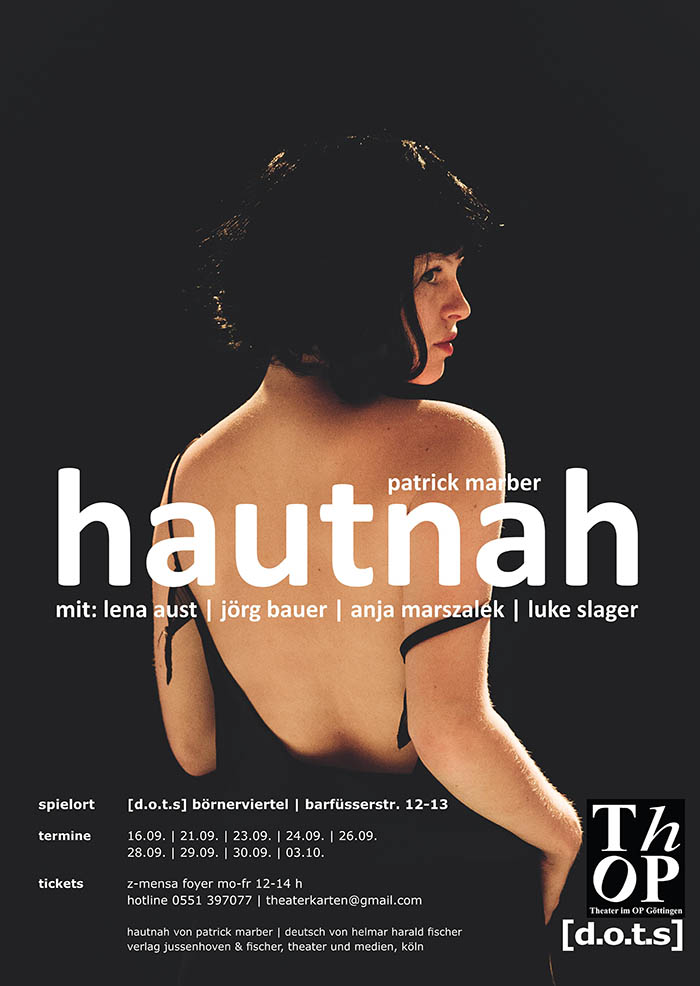
Poster for the stage production of Closer by Patrick Marber, in German, as "Hautnah" at Theater im OP (ThOP), in Göttingen, 2015

Closer (1997) is a dramatic play by British playwright Patrick Marber. It premiered at the Royal National Theatre's Cottesloe Theatre in London in 1997 and made its North American debut at the Music Box Theatre on Broadway on 25 January 1999.

It was adapted by Marber for the 2004 film of the same name, produced and directed by Mike Nichols.

== Background ==
Closer was first performed at the Royal National Theatre in London on 22 May 1997; it was the second original play written by Patrick Marber.

== Work ==
- Marber, Patrick (1999). Closer (First ed.). London: Methuen Drama. ISBN 0-413-70950-7.

== Plot ==
A young man, Dan, takes a young woman to hospital after she has been hit by a taxi; they flirt while waiting for the doctor to attend to her bloodied knee. Dermatologist Larry inspects her leg briefly and leaves. Dan and the young woman introduce themselves—he is Daniel Woolf, an obituary writer and failed novelist who mentions how he and his colleagues use euphemisms humorously in their work in obituaries. At the young woman's prompting, he says that his euphemism would be "reserved" and hers would be "disarming". She is Alice Ayres, a self-described waif who has a scar along her leg shaped like a question mark. Wanting him to spend the rest of the day with her, she calls in sick to his office for him.

More than a year later, Dan is on the verge of publishing a book based on Alice's past as a stripper, and Anna is taking his photograph for publicity. Dan is infatuated with Anna, despite being in a relationship with Alice, for whom he left his former girlfriend. He begs Anna to see him again, and she rejects him. Alice overhears this conversation. She asks Anna to take her photo, and after Dan leaves, confronts her. Anna insists that she is "not a thief" and snaps a photo of a tear-stricken Alice.

Six months later, Dan and Larry meet in an adult chat room. Dan impersonates Anna and has Internet sex with Larry. He tries to play a practical joke on Larry by arranging for Larry to meet him (Dan pretending to be Anna in the chat room) in the London Aquarium the next day. When Larry arrives, stunned to see Anna (who Dan did not know would be there), he acts believing that she is the same person from the chat and makes a fool of himself. Anna catches on and says that Dan was probably playing a practical joke on him. She reveals that it is her birthday and snaps a photo of Larry.

At Anna's exhibition of photos, Alice stands in front of the photo of her, looking at it; Dan is watching her. They have an argument over Alice's feeling that Dan will leave her. Larry meets Alice, whom he recognises as the woman in the photo, and knows that she is Dan's girlfriend. Meanwhile, Dan persuades Anna to carry on an affair with him. They cheat on their partners with each other, even through Anna and Larry's marriage. A year later, they tell their partners the truth and leave to be with each other.

Alice, devastated, disappears from Dan's life. She returns to stripping, using the name Jane. Larry finds her at a seedy strip club in London, where he pushes her to tell the truth about her name. He asks, "Tell me something true, Alice." She says, "Lying is the most fun a girl can have without taking her clothes off—but it's better if you do." They share a connection based on mutual betrayal and heartbreak. He asks her to meet him later for sex. She declines.

A month after this, Anna is late meeting Dan for dinner. She is coming from asking Larry to sign the divorce papers. Dan finds out that Larry had demanded Anna have sex with him before he would sign the papers. Dan becomes upset and jealous, asking Anna why she did not lie to him. They have a candid, truthful conversation. Anna reveals that she did have sex with Larry and he did sign the papers.

Alice meanwhile has been having sex with Larry. On his birthday, she summons him to the museum and sets up Anna to meet him there. Larry and Anna exchange words, as Anna discovers Alice and Larry have been having a casual relationship. Larry asks Anna if their divorce will ever become finalised; he leaves when Alice emerges. The two women share an exchange in which their mutual animosity is revealed. Anna calls Alice "primitive", a description Alice accepts. The younger Alice describes Larry's emotional state as troubled and learns from Anna that Dan still calls out for "Buster" (Alice's nickname) in his sleep.

Anna goes back to Larry. Distraught, Dan confronts Larry at his office and has to reconcile himself to the loss of Anna. Larry recommends that Dan return to Alice and reveals that he had seen her in the strip club. He lies for Alice at first and tells Dan that they did not have sex, since Alice feared that, if Dan found out, he would not want her any more. At the end, Larry decides to hurt Dan and reveals the truth—that they had sex.

Dan and Alice, back together, prepare to go to the United States. They relive the memories of their first meeting, but Dan is haunted by their encounters with Larry and Anna and pushes Alice to tell him the truth. In the moment when Alice becomes caught between refusing to tell the truth and being unable to lie to him, she says, "I don't love you anymore. Goodbye." (She had told Dan in the beginning that these are the words she tells her significant others when their relationship is over and she is going to leave.) She tells Dan to leave. He struggles with her; she spits in his face, and he throws her back on the bed, grabbing her neck. She dares him to hit her, and he does; she leaves.

Later, Anna and Larry meet again, only to reveal that they have broken up once again and Larry is dating Polly, a young nurse. They are meeting because Alice has died the night before in New York, having been hit by a car while crossing the street. Their conversation also reveals that "Alice" was always a pseudonym—her real name was actually Jane. Larry leaves as Dan arrives because he has patients to see. Dan talks with Anna and says that no one could identify Alice's body and he is flying over to the United States to do so. Before Dan leaves, he tells Anna that Ruth, his ex-girlfriend whom he left for Alice/Jane, is now married, has a child, and is pregnant with a second. She married a poet, having fallen in love with him (without ever having met him) after reading his book of poems, Solitude. Dan and Anna bid each other goodbye. Dan leaves to catch his flight, leaving Anna alone.

== Genre ==
Closer is written in the style of a drama, characteristically blending elements of classical tragedy, classical comedy, and melodrama. Conflicts occur between people, in the style of a melodrama. But the way the plot progresses is comedic, in that several romances are pursued. Dan plays a massive comedic trick on Larry, which results in another romance emerging. There are moments of cognito, where Alice realises that she does not love Dan any more and Dan realises he loves Alice—and the final moment of revelation occurs when Alice's true identity is unveiled. But these elements blend with melodramatic plot twists—the four characters switch partners frequently, and their emotional statuses constantly fluctuate between high and low, in a series of reversals that build toward increasing tension.

== Staging ==
The play is set in a few small places—a hospital room, a studio, a pair of living rooms, a café, a room in the museum, in front of a photo at a showing, a doctor's office, a bench in front of a suggested aquarium. The text of the play insists on all settings being "minimal". The lack of physical detail is meant to balance the verbal excess. Places are evoked, not shown—benches instead of the front of a museum; a large photo instead of the entire exhibit.

According to Robert Brustein, in the original production, "Memorial blocks constitute the backdrop of the set—a design that gradually accumulates all the scenic pieces used in the play, as if these four lives were a detritus of props and furniture." The setting is formed to be deliberately symbolic.

== Themes ==
The central theme of Closer revolves around truth. All the characters have a tense relationship with truth—only Alice is "not passionate about veracity". Truth, for Dan, is what distinguishes humans from animals—and yet Alice accepts her identity as not quite human for any of the other characters, and loves her primitivism. Arguably, her inability to deal with the truth causes her to leave Dan at the end. Those who are passionate about veracity press each other to tell the complete truth, no matter the emotional pain caused by it—and the controlling irony of the situation is that though the truth clarifies, it does not bring together. No one is made "closer" by the truth.

The play challenges the illusion of love and romance. Dan, the failed writer, speaks in romantic language but feels few qualms about his infidelities. The characters are driven both by a need for love and a need for sex—these needs clash at times, as when Larry tells Dan that Alice needed love, and Dan had left her for a relationship with Anna. The mythic constructions surrounding personal relationships—the myth of love and truth bringing us together—are turned on their head by Marber.

Closer has been described as a work that "gets under its audience's skin, and ... not for the emotionally squeamish", a work in which "Marber is alert to the cruel inequalities of love, as the characters change partners in what sometimes comes over like a modern reworking of Coward's Private Lives."

== Language ==
Marber uses direct, emotionally brutal and sexually explicit language. In scene three, when Dan and Larry are instant messaging on an adult website, Marber uses crude and up-to-date terminology and dialogue typical of such a communication.

In a review of the Broadway run in New York magazine, John Simon writes,

"Marber tells his story in short, staccato scenes in which the unsaid talks as loudly as the said. The dialogue is almost entirely stichomythic, the occasional speech still not much longer than a few lines. There are frequent pauses, but not of the Pinteresque variety—more like skipped heartbeats ... Closer does not merely hold your attention; it burrows into you."

According to Matt Wolf, "the animalistic pulse of the play [is] reflected in its often scabrous language".

== Music ==
Although no music is indicated in Marber's script, productions have commonly used classical music. This was also the case in the 2004 film version of Closer. In one production, the music in Closer was composed by Paddy Cunneen, a score described as sounding like "modern Bach".

== Productions ==
=== Royal National Theatre ===
It was first performed at the Royal National Theatre, London, on 22 May 1997.

- Dan .... Clive Owen
- Alice .... Liza Walker
- Anna .... Sally Dexter
- Larry .... Ciarán Hinds

After its initial run, the production moved from the Cottlesloe to the Lyttleton Theatre in mid-1997. Mark Strong replaced Owen and Neil Dudgeon replaced Hinds; Walker and Dexter remained with the production.

=== West End ===
In March the next year the play moved to the West End.

- Dan .... Lloyd Owen
- Alice .... Liza Walker
- Anna .... Frances Barber
- Larry .... Neil Pearson

=== Music Box Theatre ===
The first American performance was presented 9 March 1999, on Broadway at the Music Box Theater, New York, by Robert Fox, Scott Rudin, Roger Berlind, Carole Shorenstein Hays, ABC Inc., the Shubert Organization, and the Royal National Theatre.

- Dan .... Rupert Graves
- Alice .... Anna Friel
- Anna .... Natasha Richardson
- Larry .... Ciarán Hinds

The production core consisted of:

Director	Patrick Marber
Designer	Vicki Mortimer
Lighting	Hugh Vanstone
Music	Paddy Cunneen
Sound	Simon Baker
Internet	John Owens
Production stage manager	R. Wade Jackson

Closer ran for 172 performances on Broadway during 1999, with Polly Draper replacing Richardson starting 15 June. Closer won the New York Drama Critics' Circle Award for Best Foreign Play and was nominated for a Tony Award for Best Play in 1999.

=== Theatre Fontaine ===
It received its Paris premiere on 22 December 1998 at the Theatre Fontaine, in a production based on a French translation by Pierre Laville and directed by Patrice Kerbrat.

- Dan .... Gad Elmaleh
- Alice .... Anne Brochet
- Anna .... Caroline Sihol
- Larry .... Jean-Philippe Ecoffey

=== California ===
Early productions of Closer on the West Coast of the United States include one featuring Maggie Gyllenhaal as Alice in a Berkeley Repertory Theatre production from 19 May to 9 July 2000 (directed by Wilson Milam). Gyllenhaal played opposite Rebecca De Mornay as Anna in a Mark Taper Forum production in December 2000, directed by Robert Egan.

=== Divadlo Na Jezerce ===
Directed by Jan Hřebejk. The play had its premiere on 22 November 2009 in Jezerka Theatre, in Prague. The Czech title is Na Dotek.

- Dan .... Jiří Macháček
- Alice .... Kristýna Liška Boková
- Anna .... Lenka Vlasáková
- Larry .... Marek Daniel

=== Slezské divadlo ===
Directed by Ivan Krejčí. The play had its premiere on 21 March 2004 in the Silesian Theatre in Opava, Czech Republic.

- Dan .... Ladislav Špiner or Ondřej Veselý
- Alice .... Sabina Figarová or Veronika Senciová
- Anna .... Hana Vaňková
- Larry .... Kostas Zerdaloglu

== Other productions and translations ==
As of 2001, the play has been produced in more than a hundred cities in over thirty different languages around the world.

In February 2009 a new German translation of the play opened in Berlin under the title Hautnah.

In 2015, David Leveaux revived Marber's Closer at the Donmar Warehouse in Covent Garden, London.

In 2019, the Israeli Cameri Theater debuted a production of the play, translated and directed by Miri Lazar.

== Film adaptation ==
In 2004, Marber adapted the play for a film of the same title. The feature film was directed by Mike Nichols, with stars Julia Roberts, Jude Law, Natalie Portman, and Clive Owen.

== References in popular culture ==
The band Panic! at the Disco split a line from the play into two song titles on their 2005 album A Fever You Can't Sweat Out: "Lying Is the Most Fun a Girl Can Have Without Taking Her Clothes Off" and "But It's Better If You Do".

Larry's line to Dan, "Have you ever seen a human heart? It looks like a fist wrapped in blood", is used by Canadian post-hardcore band Silverstein as a title to the song "Fist Wrapped in Blood" on their 2005 album Discovering the Waterfront. The line was also sampled in the Killwhitneydead song "Let Me Give You A Hand Throwing Yourself Out"

The line Anna speaks to Larry, "He tastes like you, only sweeter", is used in the 2007 Fall Out Boy song "Thnks fr th Mmrs". Also, the line spoken by Larry to Alice/Jane in the strip club, "I love everything about you that hurts", is used in the Fall Out Boy song "G.I.N.A.S.F.S.".

Dan and Alice's conversation where Alice tells Dan that she doesn't love him anymore is used by the American depressive black metal band Happy Days in the song "Abigail".

== Awards and nominations ==
The play won the 1997 Evening Standard Best Comedy Award and the 1998 Laurence Olivier Award for Best New Play.

Awards

- 1998 Laurence Olivier Award for Best New Play
- 1999 New York Drama Critics' Circle Award for Best Foreign Play

Nominations

- 1999 Drama Desk Award for Outstanding Play
- 1999 Tony Award for Best Play
