= Cunneen =

Cunneen is a surname. Notable people with the surname include:

- Dan Cunneen (born 1963), American musician
- James Cunneen (1826–1889), Australian politician
- Jim Cunneen, American politician
- John Cunneen (1848–1907), American lawyer and politician
- John Cunneen (bishop) (1932–2010), New Zealand prelate
- Margaret Cunneen (born 1959), Australian barrister and prosecutor
- Paddy Cunneen (born 1936), Irish retired hurler
- Peter Cunneen (1926–2007), Australian speedway driver
- Shannon Cunneen (born 1977), Australian cricket player
