= Ahoskie (YTB-804) =

Tugboat of the United States Navy

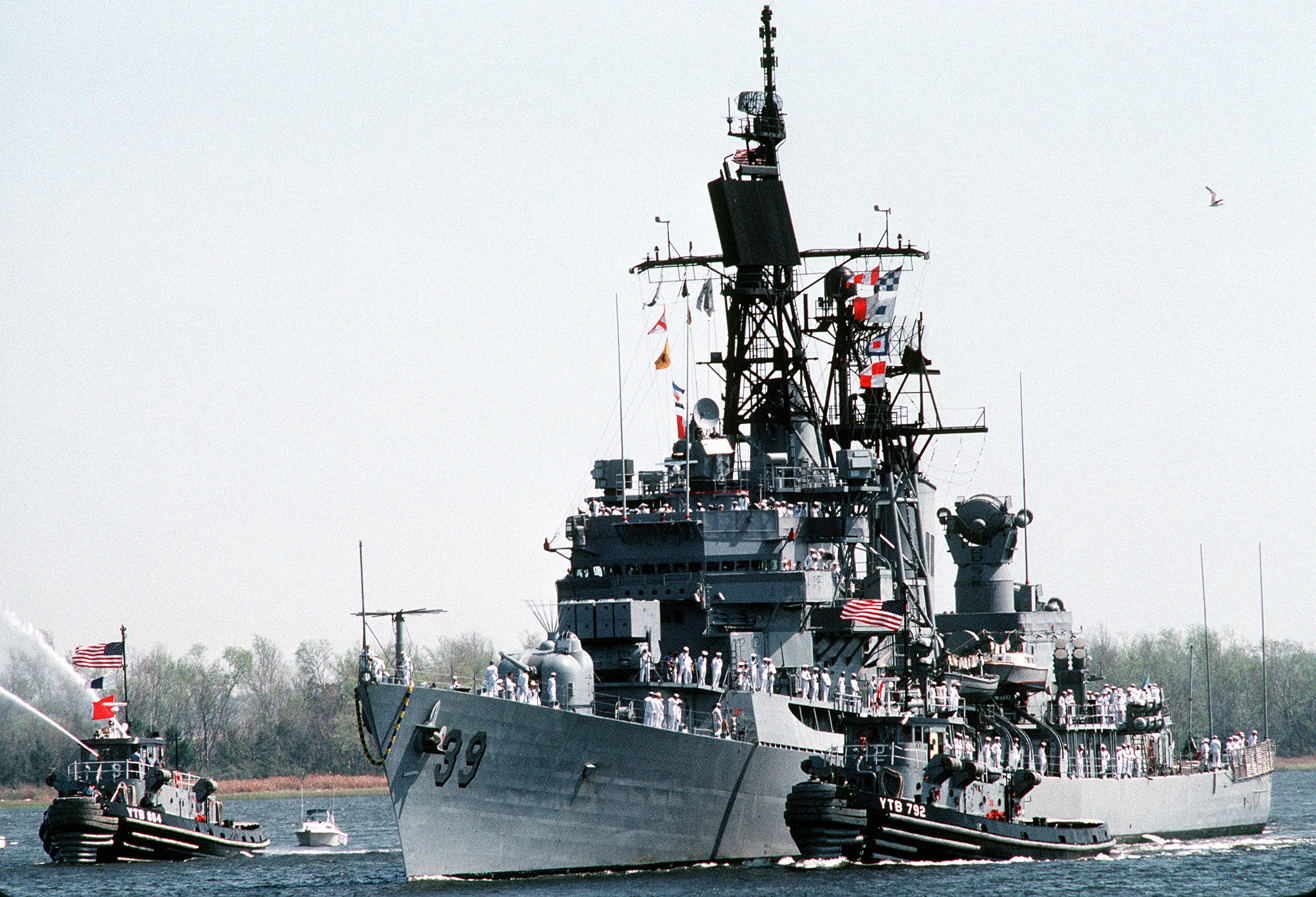
- Ahoskie (YTB-804), left, sprays streams of water into the air as Antigo (YTB-792) comes alongside the guided-missile destroyer USS Macdonough (DDG-39) to escort her up the Cooper River to Naval Station, Charleston, 22 March 1991.

History

United States
- Name: Ahoskie
- Namesake: Ahoskie, North Carolina
- Awarded: 4 March 1969
- Builder: Peterson Builders, Sturgeon Bay, Wisconsin
- Laid down: 23 June 1969
- Launched: 14 January 1970
- Acquired: 7 July 1970
- Stricken: 10 October 1995
- Home port: Charleston, S.C.v
- Identification: IMO number: 8980866, YTB-804
- Fate: In private service in Eastport, Maine

General characteristics
- Class & type: Natick-class large harbor tug
- Displacement: 282 long tons (287 t) (light); 341 long tons (346 t) (full)
- Length: 109 ft (33 m)
- Beam: 31 ft (9.4 m)
- Draft: 14 ft (4.3 m)
- Speed: 12 knots (14 mph; 22 km/h)
- Complement: 12
- Armament: None

Ahoskie (YTB-804) was a United States Navy Natick-class large harbor tug named for Ahoskie, North Carolina.

== Construction ==
The contract for Ahoskie was awarded 4 Mar 1969. She was laid down on 23 June 1969 at Sturgeon Bay, Wisconsin by Peterson Builders and launched 14 January 1970.

== Operational history ==
Delivered to the Navy on 7 July 1970, Ahoskie was assigned to duty in the 6th Naval District and based at Charleston, South Carolina. She has spent her entire Navy career providing towing and other services to ships at Charleston.

Stricken from the Navy Directory 10 October 1995, ex-Ahoskie was sold to the City of Eastport, Maine Port Authority, 7 March 1996.

Circa 2000, the ship was in civilian service in Eastport, Maine. A wooden plaque on the stack identified it as the Ahoskie.
