= Geraldines GAA =

Former Gaelic games division in County Limerick, Ireland

Geraldines
- Na Gearaldtaigh
- Founded: 1943
- County: Limerick
- Nickname: The Dines
- Colours: Red and white

Playing kits
Standard colours

Senior Club Championships
	All Ireland	Munster champions	Limerick champions
Hurling:	0	0	0

Geraldines GAA was a Gaelic Athletic Association division located in east County Limerick, Ireland. The division was primarily concerned with the game of hurling.

== History ==
Divisional Boards in Limerick were created at the start of the 20th century, with the East Board being formed in 1943. The notion of divisional teams taking part in the SHC and SFC is believed to have first been suggested in the late 1940s. These divisional teams would be composed of players from the various juvenile and intermediate clubs within the division. The divisional system had been operated by Cork GAA in their competitions since the 1930s.

Geraldines, as the division became known, contested the SHC final for the first time in 1949, but were beaten by 1-07 to 1-03 by St Patrick's. Geraldines had further SHC final defeats in 1951 (Treaty Sarsfields) and 1955 (Ahane).

== Honours ==
- Limerick Senior Hurling Championship (0):
  - (Runners-up) 1949, 1951, 1955
