= Paddy Cobbe =

Irish hurler

Personal information
- Native name: Pádraig Cobb (Irish)
- Nickname: Paddy
- Born: 1940 (age 85–86) Limerick, Ireland

Sport
- Sport: Hurling
- Position: Right corner-forward
Club
- Years: Club
- St Patrick's
Club titles
- Limerick titles: 0
Inter-county*
Years	County	Apps (scores)
1963-1964	Limerick	3 (0-00)
Inter-county titles
- Munster titles: 0
- All-Irelands: 0
- NHL: 0
- *Inter County team apps and scores correct as of 00:50, 23 June 2015.

Patrick Cobbe (born 1940) is an Irish retired hurler who played as right corner-forward for the Limerick senior team.

Born in Limerick, Cobbe first played competitive hurling during his schooling at CBS Sexton Street. He arrived on the inter-county scene at the age of seventeen when he first linked up with the Limerick minor team. He joined the senior panel during the 1963 championship. Cobbe was a regular member of the team over the next few years, however, he ended his career without any major success.

At club level Cobbe played with St Patrick's.

Cobbe's retirement came following the conclusion of the 1964 championship.

== Honours ==
=== Team ===
Limerick

- All-Ireland Minor Hurling Championship (1): 1958 (c)
- Munster Minor Hurling Championship (1): 1958 (c)

Achievements
Preceded by Jimmy Doyle (Tipperary)	All-Ireland Minor Hurling Final winning captain 1958	Succeeded by Larry Kiely (Tipperary)
