= 1952 Limerick Senior Hurling Championship =

Annual hurling competition season

- Champions: Treaty Sarsfields (2nd title)
- Runners-up: St. Patrick's

The 1952 Limerick Senior Hurling Championship was the 58th staging of the Limerick Senior Hurling Championship since its establishment by the Limerick County Board in 1887.

Treaty Sarsfields were the defending champions.

Treaty Sarsfields won the championship after a 6–10 to 1–02 defeat of St. Patrick's in the final. It was their second championship title overall and their second title in succession.
