= Theater im OP =

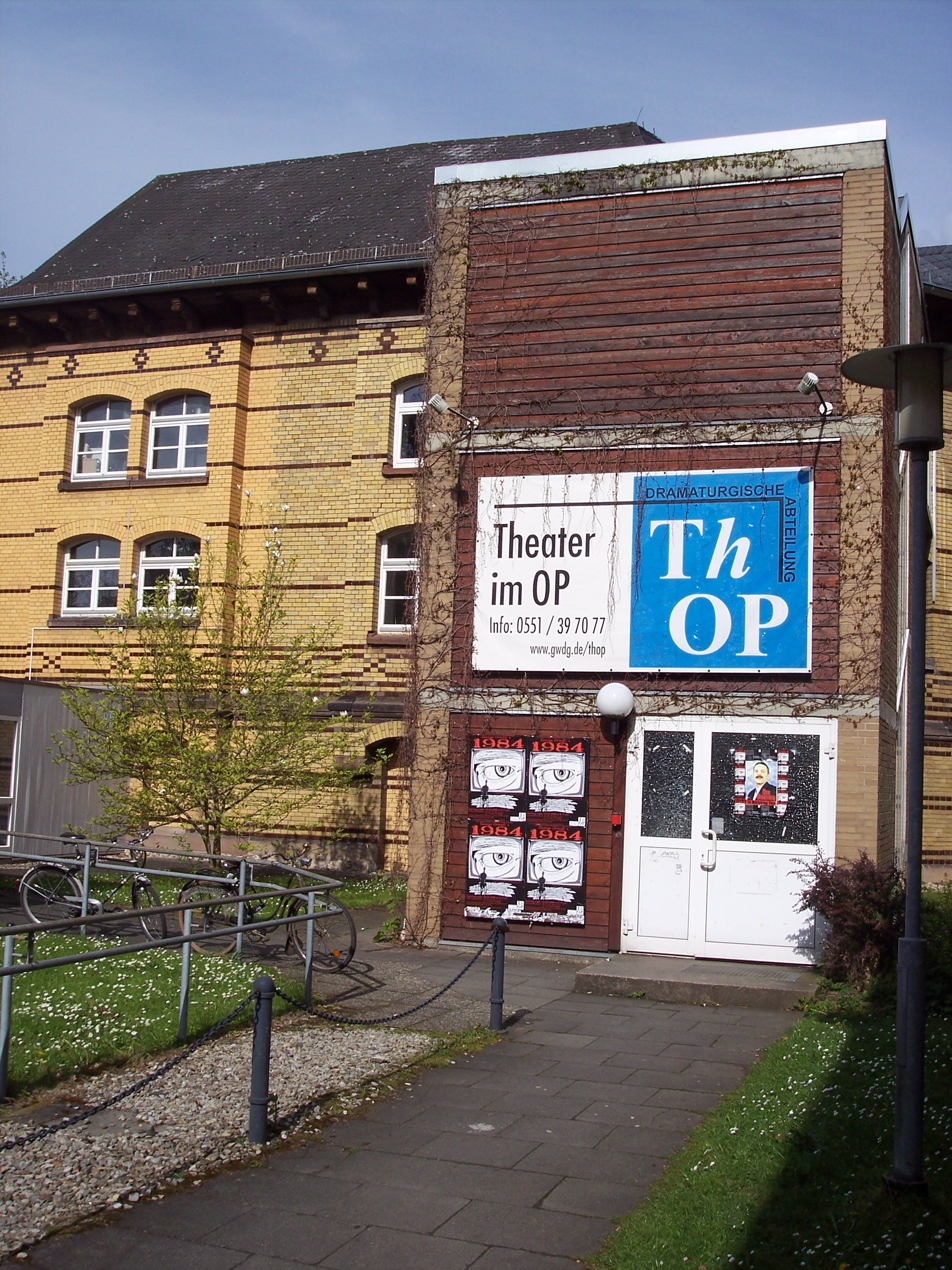
- audience entrance May 3, 2008
- Interactive map of Theater im OP
- Address: 3 Käte-Hamburger-Weg; Göttingen, LS 37073; Germany
- Coordinates: 51.5418°N 9.94°E
- Public transit: Campus
- Owner: Georg-August-Universität
- Type: theater
- Seating type: wooden benches
- Capacity: 120
- Field size: 5 m × 9 m (16 ft × 30 ft)
- Field shape: rectangular

Construction
- Opened: 1984; 42 years ago

Website
- www.theater-im-op.de

The Theater im OP, abbreviated ThOP (/tɔp/), is a community theater on the former premises of the Georg-August-Universität medical center. The stage is situated in the former anatomical theater. The theater's name refers to this, OP standing for German: Operationssaal, lit. 'operating hall' (operating room, OR).

== History ==
The theater was founded by the drama section of the German Department in 1984. Its primary mission is to give opportunities to students for training and hands-on experience in a theater.

The theater evolved to the largest student theater in Germany. It has become one of the largest of its kind across Europe.

== Venue ==
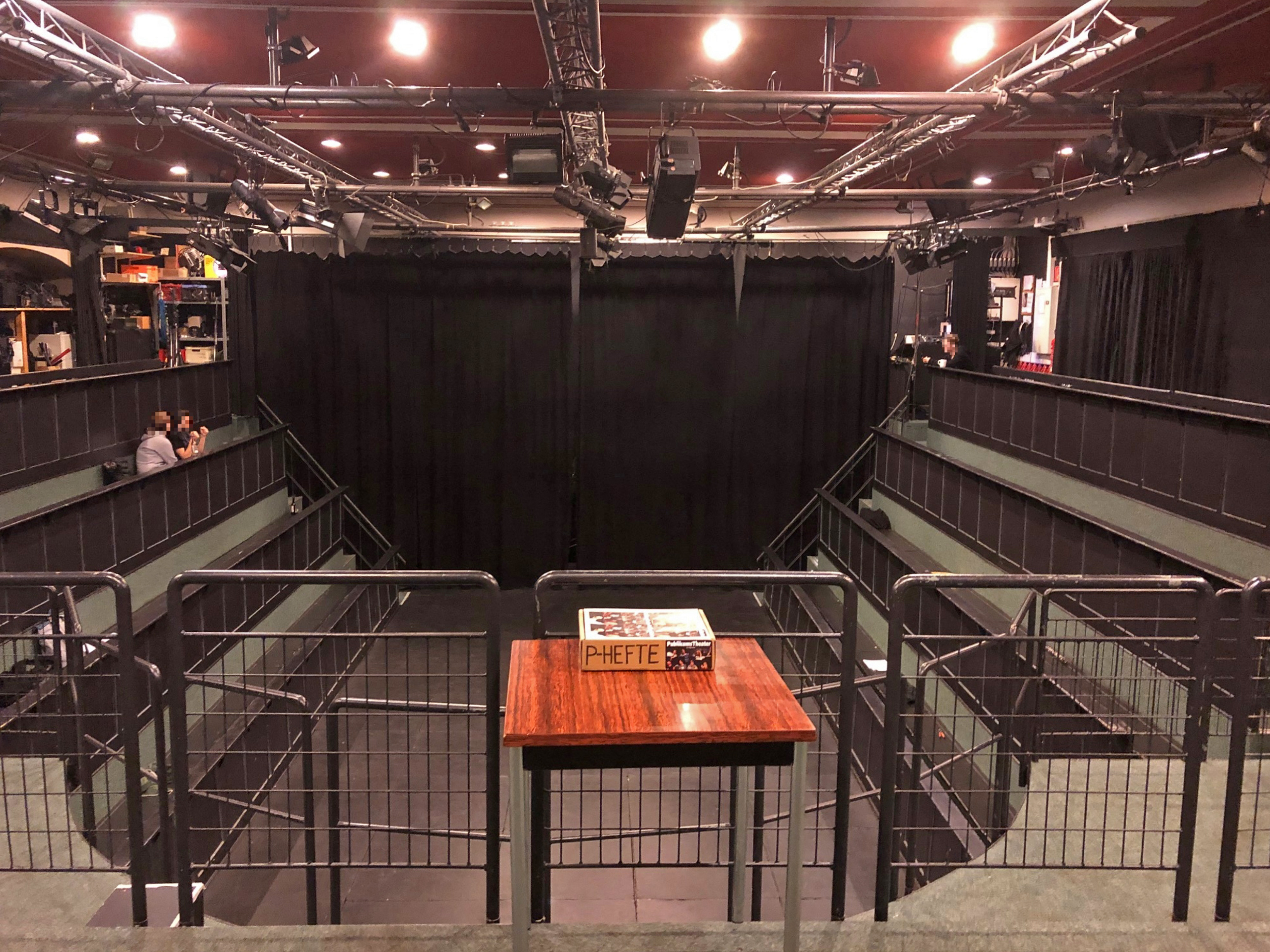
stage and terraces as seen from the gallery

The former operating room has two opposing straight elongated stands, east and west. The rows of benches rise very steeply, allowing an unobstructed view. The northern face of the building has a large window, that is usually covered with a black sheet of molton. The southern gallery may be used for additional seats. This arrangement then virtually creates a thrust stage.

There is no glass dome separating observers from the scene. Unlike during an operation focused on one spot in the middle of the hall, actors can – and do – use the whole width and length of the stage. This, combined with the bench structure, tend to give the theater an intimate atmosphere.

A separate staircase for the audience has been attached to the building's southwest. While the stage level can be reached via an elevator, the gallery can not. Nonetheless, the crew is determined to find means allowing everyone to attend shows.

A dressing room, a make-up room and a workshop, beside other facilities, are located laterally to the stage, underneath the stands and gallery. Below the main stage, the former ER's operating room serves the ThOP as a rehearsal stage. Some productions used it as a stage for public audience, too. However, the former barrel vault-like operating room is limited to 30 persons. Yet it is accessible by wheelchair via ramps, as it is slightly below street level.

Properties and costumes are stored in the attic of an adjacent building, if they are not in use in current or upcoming productions.

From October 2014 till March 2016 a damage of the roof forced the ThOP to use other irregular venues. Unfortunately this coincided with the 30-year anniversary of the theater. Alternative venues were for example a (secondary) stage at the city theater Deutsches Theater, as well as the stage of the Junges Theater, but also non-theater surroundings such as the assembly hall at the former grounds of the local private university, now also property of the Georg-August-university, and the ThOP's own rehearsal stage the former ER's OR.

In the course of building repairs a ventilation system has been built in into the ThOP's own attic. It helps managing excess heat emitted by a full house and lighting.

== Operations ==
Productions are shown en suite. One ensemble "moves in" into the ThOP, sets up the stage setting and performs final rehearsals, and then has public performances usually over the course of two weeks, until they "move out" again yielding the stage to the next ensemble. This cycle allows up to 12 productions to premiere per year, totaling about 130 shows.

Casts and crews are predominantly students, but a sizable number of the participants are university staff and towns-people as well. Enrolled university students can obtain credits in some courses of studies.

Directors have to go through a vetting process, by being an Assistant Director for one production at the ThOP first. The remaining tasks have more or less formal requirements, but there is a culture of passing forward skills and knowledge: Senior ThOP affiliates instruct novices, who themselves may eventually become senior ThOP members too.

There is only one position funded by the department, accompanied by some (student) assistants. All participants are otherwise volunteers. The admission pricing policy is non-profit, nonetheless subsidies and sponsoring support the budget. Enrolled students of the Georg-August-Universität can attend shows for a compulsory flatrate. A bar serving bottled drinks belongs to the theater's services.

Most plays are in German. The "English drama workshop" stages a play in English once per year. There have been productions incorporating German sign language, too.

There is no limit to the range of genres. Classical plays as well as contemporary dramas are shown. Since 2004 the theater also hosts a budding dramatists competition. The eventually winning play is guaranteed to have its world premiere in the ThOP.

stagings (excerpt)
title	premiere	notes
Andorra	September 13, 2019	
Antigone	May 15, 2007	
Age of Cannibals	December 4, 2015	
Arsenic and Old Lace	April 2012	in English
August: Osage County	June 26, 2019	
Baal	July 10, 2008	
Beautiful Thing	July 12, 2017	
Bent	October 6, 2017	
Boeing-Boeing	September 2016	
The Brothers Lionheart	January 16, 2016	
A Clockwork Orange	September 2009	
Closer	September 16, 2015	
The Comedy of Errors	January 11, 2008	
The Country Wife	May 2014	in English
Death and the Maiden	March 6, 2015	
Dream Story	January 17, 2020	
Educating Rita	August 18, 2007	
8 Women	November 2013	
The Fire Raisers	October 2011	
Four Rooms	June 10, 2011	in English
Frau Müller muss weg!	October 28, 2017	
Ghosts	July 16, 2014	
Heart of Stone	November 28, 2012	
Hedda Gabler	November 3, 2007	
Herr Lehmann	May 6, 2016	
An Ideal Husband	August 2010	
The Imaginary Invalid	January 2010	
An Inspector Calls	March 12, 2014	
Jake's Women	July 5, 2016	
Killer Joe	September 8, 2017	
Krabat	December 4, 2008	
Ladies Night	January 11, 2014	
Les Liaisons Dangereuses	April 29, 2010	
Lysistrata	June 9, 2017	musical adaptation
The Maids	December 4, 2007	
A Midsummer Night's Dream	June 2013	in English
A Midsummer Night's Sex Comedy	February 14, 2009	
Mr. Marmalade	September 5, 2014	
A Murder Is Announced	March 1, 2007	
1984	May 2, 2008	in English
Pictures at an Exhibition	July 2009	
The Pillowman	May 31, 2019	
Possible Worlds	February 7, 2015	
Pygmalion	April 21, 2007	in English
A Report to an Academy	April 15, 2016	
Romeo and Juliet	May 12, 2017	modern adaptation
Ronia, the Robber's Daughter	December 3, 2010	
The Seagull	January 2012	
Shoppen	November 4, 2016	
Survivor	January 17, 2013	own dramatization
The Sound of Music	June 8, 2016	in English
The Taming of the Shrew	May 20, 2009	in English
Tango	April 18, 2009	
Tartuffe	January 2011	
The 35th of May, or Conrad's Ride to the South Seas	December 6, 2019	
Vernon God Little	February 16, 2013	
We're No Angels	December 2009	
What the Butler Saw	April 5, 2017	in English
Who's Afraid of Virginia Woolf?	February 2010	

Due to the coronavirus pandemic the theater temporarily shut down its operations mid March 2020, like virtually all theaters in Germany. All productions were put on hold and will be shown as soon as rehearsals become possible again. Nonetheless, ThOP-related classes were still held, although predominately via distance teaching.
