= 1950 Limerick Senior Hurling Championship =

Annual hurling competition season

- Champions: St. Patrick's (2nd title); Paddy Fitzgerald (captain)
- Runners-up: City Gaels

The 1950 Limerick Senior Hurling Championship was the 56th staging of the Limerick Senior Hurling Championship since its establishment by the Limerick County Board.

St. Patrick's were the defending champions.

St. Patrick's won the championship after a 4–05 to 3–05 defeat of City Gaels in the final. It was their second championship title overall and their second title in succession. It remains their last championship triumph.

== Championship statistics ==
=== Miscellaneous ===
- City Gaels become the first divisional side to qualify for the final.
