= Vivian Cobbe =

Irish hurler (1934–2023)

Personal information
- Native name: Béibhinn Mac Cobb (Irish)
- Nickname: Meteorological assistant
- Born: 26 January 1934 Mountmellick, County Laois, Ireland
- Died: 31 October 2023 (aged 89) Limerick, County Limerick, Ireland
- Height: 5 ft 6 in (168 cm)

Sport
- Sport: Hurling
- Position: Left corner-forward
Club
- Years: Club
- St. Patrick's
Club titles
- Limerick titles: 0
Inter-county
- Years: County
- Limerick
Inter-county titles
- Munster titles: 1
- All-Irelands: 0
- NHL: 0

Vivian G. Cobbe (26 January 1934 – 31 October 2023) was an Irish hurler who played at club level with St. Patrick's, at inter-county level with Limerick and at inter-provincial level with Munster.

== Background ==
Cobbe was born in Mountmellick, County Laois, Ireland on 26 January 1934. He died at home in Limerick, County Limerick, on 31 October 2023, at the age of 89.

== Career ==
From the St. Patrick's club, Cobbe first came to prominence on the inter-county scene with the Limerick junior team that overcame London to win the 1955 All-Ireland Junior Championship. Promotion to the senior side followed, with Cobbe lining out in the forwards when Limerick surprised Clare to win the 1955 Munster Championship. The team, labelled "Mackey's Greyhounds" after their trainer Mick Mackey, were subsequently beaten by eventual champions Wexford in the All-Ireland semi-final. Cobbe continued playing for Limerick until the 1960s, by which time he had also won two Railway Cup medals with Munster.

== Honours ==
Limerick

- Munster Senior Hurling Championship: 1955
- All-Ireland Junior Hurling Championship: 1954
- Munster Junior Hurling Championship: 1954

Munster

- Railway Cup: 1957, 1958
