= USS Macdonough =

USS Macdonough may refer to the following ships of the United States Navy:

- USS Macdonough (DD-9), was an early destroyer, launched in 1900 and served until 1919
- USS Macdonough (DD-331), was a Clemson-class destroyer, launched in 1920 and served until 1930
- USS Macdonough (DD-351), was a Farragut-class destroyer, launched in 1934 and served through World War II until 1945
- USS Macdonough (DDG-39), was a Farragut-class guided missile frigate (destroyer leader), launched in 1959 and served until 1992

== See also ==
- SS Thomas Macdonough a Liberty ship
