= John McDonough =

John McDonough may refer to:

- John McDonough (businessman) (1951–2023), British businessman, CEO of Carillion
- John McDonough (Savannah mayor) (1849–1926), American politician, mayor of Savannah, Georgia, 1891–1895
- John McDonough (sports executive) (born 1953), president of the Chicago Blackhawks
- John McDonough (American football referee) (1916–1978), American pro football referee
- John McDonough (piper) (died 1850s), Irish piper
- John E. McDonough (born 1953), member of the Massachusetts House of Representatives, 1985–1997
- John J. McDonough (mayor) (1895–1962), American politician, mayor of St. Paul, Minnesota, 1940–1948
- John J. McDonough (Massachusetts politician), member of the Boston School Committee
- John P. McDonough (politician) (born 1950), American politician from Maryland
- John P. McDonough (chaplain) (1928–2021), Chief of Chaplains of the U.S. Air Force
- John T. McDonough (1843–1917), American politician, Secretary of State of New York 1899–1902, and Associate Justice of the Supreme Court of the Philippines, 1903–1904
- Jack McDonough (1879–1955), Australian rules footballer
