= 1943 Limerick Senior Hurling Championship =

Annual hurling competition season

- Champions: Ahane (10th title); Mick Mackey (captain)
- Runners-up: Croom

The 1943 Limerick Senior Hurling Championship was the 49th staging of the Limerick Senior Hurling Championship since its establishment by the Limerick County Board.

Ahane were the defending champions.

On 12 September 1943, Ahane won the championship after a 7–02 to 1–02 defeat of Croom in the final. It was their 10th championship title overall and their second title in succession.

== Results ==
=== Final ===
| 12 September 1943 Final | Ahane | 7–02 – 1–02 | Croom | Gaelic Grounds, Limerick |
