= 1951 Limerick Senior Hurling Championship =

Annual hurling competition season

- Champions: Treaty Sarsfields (1st title)
- Runners-up: Geraldines

The 1951 Limerick Senior Hurling Championship was the 57th staging of the Limerick Senior Hurling Championship since its establishment by the Limerick County Board in 1887.

St. Patrick's were the defending champions.

Treaty Sarsfields won the championship after a 1–06 to 1–02 defeat of Geraldines in the final. It was their first ever championship title.
