= 1946 Limerick Senior Hurling Championship =

Annual hurling competition season

- Champions: Ahane (13th title); Mick Mackey (captain)
- Runners-up: Croom

The 1946 Limerick Senior Hurling Championship was the 52nd staging of the Limerick Senior Hurling Championship since its establishment by the Limerick County Board.

Ahane were the defending champions.

Ahane won the championship after a 6–07 to 1–01 defeat of Croom in the final. It was their 13th championship title overall and their fifth title in succession.

== Results ==
=== Final ===
| Final | Ahane | 6–07 – 1–01 | Croom | Gaelic Grounds, Limerick |
