= 1953 Limerick Senior Hurling Championship =

Annual hurling competition season

- Champions: Treaty Sarsfields (3rd title)
- Runners-up: Ahane

The 1953 Limerick Senior Hurling Championship was the 59th staging of the Limerick Senior Hurling Championship since its establishment by the Limerick County Board in 1887.

Treaty Sarsfields were the defending champions.

Treaty Sarsfields won the championship after a 2–05 to 0–05 defeat of Ahane in the final. It was their third championship title overall and their third title in succession. It remains their last championship title.

== Championship statistics ==
=== Miscellaneous ===
- Treaty Sarsfields win the last of their three titles.
