= 1945 Limerick Senior Hurling Championship =

Annual hurling competition season

- Champions: Ahane (12th title); Mick Mackey (captain)
- Runners-up: Granagh-Ballingarry

The 1945 Limerick Senior Hurling Championship was the 51st staging of the Limerick Senior Hurling Championship since its establishment by the Limerick County Board.

Ahane were the defending champions.

On 30 September 1945, Ahane won the championship after a 5–09 to 3–02 defeat of Granagh-Ballingarry in the final. It was their 12th championship title overall and their fourth title in succession.

== Results ==
=== Final ===
30 September 1945 Final	Ahane	5–09 – 3–02	Granagh-Ballingarry	Gaelic Grounds, Limerick
