= 1944 Limerick Senior Hurling Championship =

Annual hurling competition season

- Champions: Ahane (11th title); Mick Mackey (captain)
- Runners-up: Rathkeale

The 1944 Limerick Senior Hurling Championship was the 50th staging of the Limerick Senior Hurling Championship since its establishment by the Limerick County Board.

Ahane were the defending champions.

On 10 September 1944, Ahane won the championship after a 4–02 to 1–08 defeat of Rathkeale in the final. It was their 11th championship title overall and their third title in succession.

== Results ==
=== Final ===
10 September 1944 Final	Ahane	4–02 – 1–08	Rathkeale	Gaelic Grounds, Limerick
