= St Patrick's GAA (Limerick) =

Gaelic games club in Limerick, Ireland

- CLG Naomh Pádraig
- Founded: 1886
- County: Limerick
- Nickname: St Pat's
- Colours: Green and White
- Grounds: Rhebogue, Dublin Road, Limerick

Playing kits
Home Kit

Senior Club Championships
	All Ireland	Munster champions	Limerick champions
Football:	0	0	5
Hurling:	0	0	2

St Patrick's GAA (Irish: CLG Naomh Pádraig) is a Gaelic Athletic Association located in the Rhebogue area of Limerick City, Ireland. The club fields teams in both hurling and Gaelic football.

== History ==
Located in the Rhebogue area on the banks of the River Shannon, St Patrick's GAA Club is one of the oldest clubs in Limerick, having been founded in 1886. It remains the oldest-surviving city club. The club had several successes in Gaelic football in its early years, winning back-to-back Limerick SFC titles at the expense of Commercials in 1890 and 1891. Half a century passed before the club enjoyed what could arguably be described as its most successful period. Further Limerick SFC titles were won in 1943, 1944 and 1954, while St Patrick's also claimed consecutive Limerick SHC titles in 1949 and 1950. The club's most recent success was a Limerick JAHC title in 2017. The club recently completed the building of a new club house in May 2024.

== Honours ==
- Limerick Senior Football Championship (5): 1890, 1891, 1943, 1944, 1954
- Limerick Senior Hurling Championship (2): 1949, 1950
- Limerick Junior Hurling Championship (3): 1905, 1934, 2017

== Notable players ==
- Paddy Cobbe: All-Ireland MHC-winning captain (1958)
- Vivian Cobbe: All-Ireland JHC-winner (1954)
- Paddy Cunneen: All-Ireland JHC-winner (1954)
- Gearóid Hegarty: All-Ireland SHC-winner (2018, 2020, 2021, 2022, 2023. 2026)
- John McDonogh: All-Ireland MHC-winner (1958)
- Pat O'Doherty: All-Ireland MHC runner-up (1965)
