= Gabe McDonough =

Musician

Gabe McDonough is a music and branding professional and musician. He is currently Executive Producer at MAS - Music and Strategy and has previously lead the music departments of advertising agencies TBWA\Media Arts Lab, Leo Burnett and DDB Chicago. He was a Governor of the Chicago Chapter of the Recording Academy from 2011 until 2016.

== Early life ==
McDonough is a graduate of Wilfrid Laurier University in Waterloo, Ontario.

== Career ==
In the worlds of music and branding/advertising, McDonough is "seen as a savvy translator between the creative and corporate sides."

In 2009, Adweek recognized McDonough's use of Os Mutantes song "A Minha Menina" in a McDonald's commercial as being one of the five best ad songs of all time. By including song "Lights Out" in Bud Light Lime commercials, music artist Santigold was catapulted to fame. McDonough won the 2013 Midem Marketing Competition award for Best Music Placement in a TV Commercial/Ad.

McDonough has played bass in several bands, including the London-based Piano Magic, Füxa, Boas, and The Chicago Stone Lightning Band.
