= Western Gaels GAA =

Sligo-based Gaelic games club

Western Gaels
- Gaeil an Iarthar
- Founded: 1999
- County: Sligo
- Colours: Green and White

Playing kits
Standard colours

Senior Club Championships
	All Ireland	Connacht champions	Sligo champions
Hurling:	-	-	1

Western Gaels is a Gaelic Athletic Association club in west County Sligo, Ireland. It concentrates on hurling. The club has players from 4 football clubs in West Sligo, St Pats, St Farans, Enniscrone/Kilglass and Castleconnor. The club is affiliated as an exclusive hurling club to the Sligo County Board. The club won its first Sligo Senior Hurling Championship in 2010.

== Honours ==
- Sligo Senior Hurling Championship:(1)
  - 2010

== History ==
Western Gaels Hurling Club was founded on 7 February 1999 at the inaugural meeting in Brownes Harbour Bar. The membership was open to U-14 boys from the parishes of Enniscrone/ Kilglass, Castleconnor, Easkey, Dromore & Templeboy. In the club's first year the team won the county final. The club won its first Senior County Hurling Championship in 2010 with the players from the original U-14’s being the backbone of the team. In the following years the club was decimated by emigration due to the recession but kept going with limited numbers. However in the last number of years the club has rebuilt and now has teams at every level from U-6 to senior.
