= Suzanne Clarke McDonough =

American socialite and anti-drug activist

Suzanne Clarke McDonough (born Suzanne B. Clarke in 1933) is an American socialite and anti-drug activist.

== Early life and education ==
Suzanne B. Clarke was born in Highland Park, Illinois. She is the daughter of Eugene Vincent Clarke and his wife.

Clarke studied at the Medill School of Journalism at Northwestern University.

== Career and philanthropy ==
During the 1970s, Clarke served as director of the Project Straight Dope anti-drug abuse pressure group.

In 1985, she was a board member of the Chicago Symphony Orchestra.

== Personal life ==
On January 5, 1959, Clarke eloped to Las Vegas and married Ralph Falk II. Their second child, Melanie Borden Falk, was born in April 1961. The relationship later ended in divorce. On September 28, 1985, she married William Joseph McDonough at their home in Chicago. He served as president of the Federal Reserve Bank of New York for 10 years and died in 2018.

Clarke was a prominent fixture of Chicagoan high society in the North Shore suburbs, known for her parties. She developed a similar reputation in Mexico where she founded the Cuernavaca Racquet Club.
