= Paul McDonough =

Paul McDonough may refer to:

- Paul McDonough (American football) (1916–1960), American football player
- Paul McDonough (photographer) (1941–2025), American photographer
