= Ryan McDonough =

Ryan McDonough may refer to:

- Ryan McDonough (cardiologist) (1978–2025), American cardiologist
- Ryan McDonough (ice hockey) (born 1988), Canadian ice hockey player
- Ryan McDonough (NBA executive) (born 1980), American NBA executive
