= 1942 Limerick Senior Hurling Championship =

Annual hurling competition season

- Champions: Ahane (9th title); Mick Mackey (captain)
- Runners-up: Rathkeale

The 1942 Limerick Senior Hurling Championship was the 48th staging of the Limerick Senior Hurling Championship since its establishment by the Limerick County Board.

Croom were the defending champions, however, they were defeated by Rathkeale in the Western Championship final.

On 18 October 1942, Ahane won the championship after a 7–08 to 1–00 defeat of Rathkeale in the final. It was their ninth championship title overall and their first title in three championship seasons.

== Results ==
=== Final ===
18 October 1942 Final	Ahane	7–08 – 1–00	Croom	Gaelic Grounds, Limerick
