= Bettina Walker =

Irish pianist and composer

- Born: 1837; Dublin
- Died: 4 February 1893 (aged 55–56)
- Occupations: Pianist, music educator, memoirist
- Notable work: My Musical Experiences (1890)

Bettina or Bessie Walker (1837 – 4 February 1893) was an Irish pianist and composer. She wrote a memoir of her musical education, published in 1890.

== Biography ==
Walker was born in Dublin, the daughter of physician William Augustus Walker, who died in 1838. Her mother encouraged her study of music, but opposed Walker's hopes of a career as a pianist.

Walker studied in the 1870s, first with William Sterndale Bennett in London and Carl Tausig in Berlin and Giovanni Sgambati in Rome. In 1883 she came to Weimar and continued her studies with Franz Liszt. She also studied under Ludwig Deppe, Xaver Scharwenka and Adolf Henselt. She also studied organ music with composer John Goss. She advertised herself as an "honorary associate of the St. Cecilian Academy of Rome."

After Henselt's death in 1889 she settled in Fulham, London, where she taught her piano methodology, but died four years later, in 1893, in her sixties.

== My Musical Experiences (1890) ==
Of lasting importance are Walker's "chatty and agreeable" memoirs, My Musical Experiences (1890), in which she details her numerous encounters with important musicians. "The book is pleasantly written with perfect freshness and innocence and freedom from affectation," commented one reviewer. Critics compared Walker's book to Amy Fay's Music Study in Germany (1880), an American woman's memoir about piano study in Europe, with many of the same instructors. "This book is valuable for two things," wrote another reviewer in 1892. "Its reflections upon music and the order of study, and its glimpses of remarkable and interesting personalities." In particular, Walker's descriptions of Liszt, although admiring, showed the composer "in anything but an amiable light" and "little better than a boor."

== Works ==
- Walker, Bettina (1890). My Musical Experiences. London: Richard Bentley & Sons.
- Songs and Sonnets. London: Richard Bentley & Sons. 1893.

== Bibliography ==
- Monthly Bulletin of the Carnegie Library of Pittsburgh, Volume 11 (1906), S. 327
