= Comdr. Thomas MacDonough House =

Historic house in Delaware, US

- U.S. National Register of Historic Places
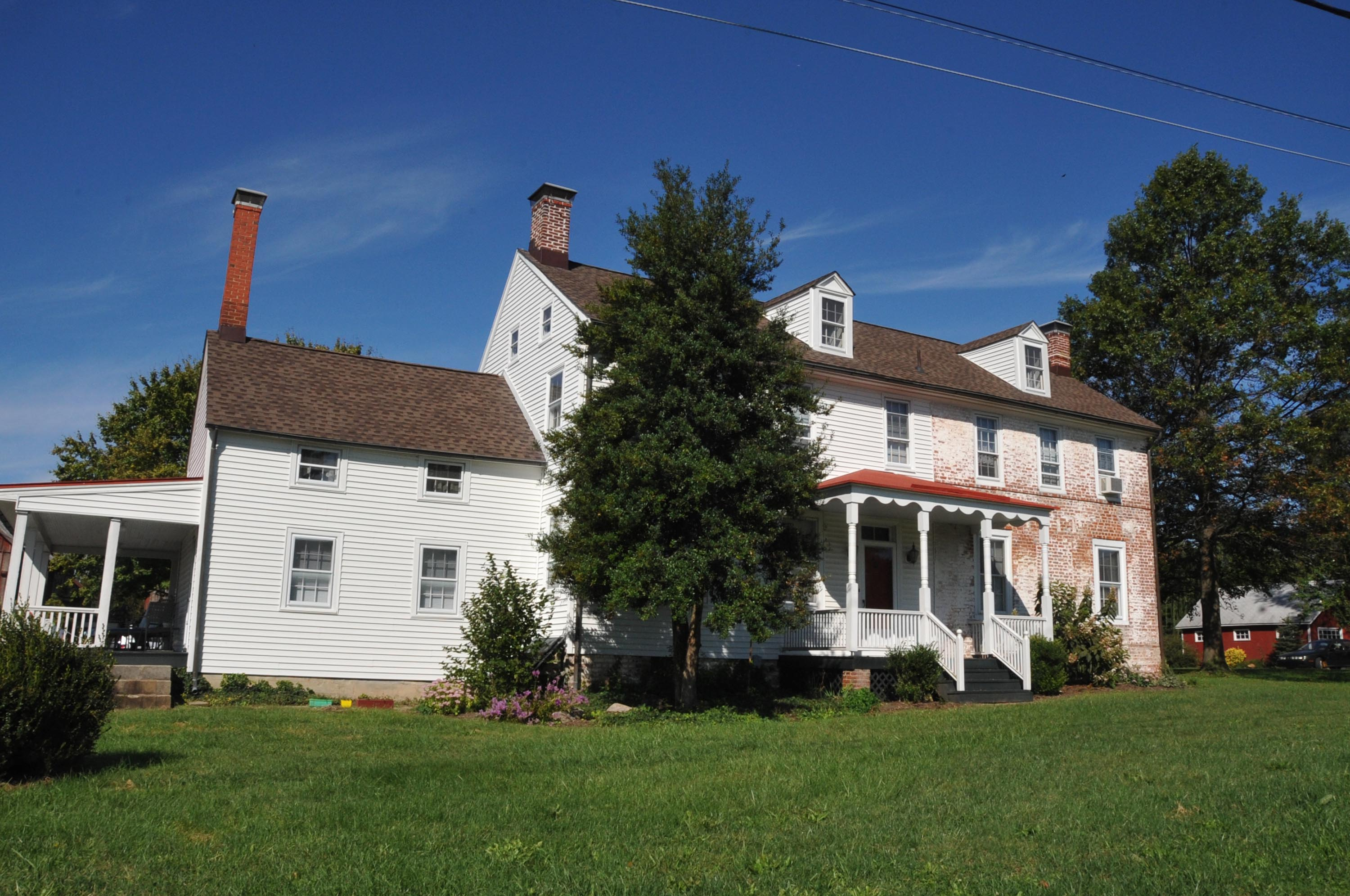
- Comdr. Thomas MacDonough House, September 2012

- Location within Delaware Location within the United States
- Location: 2501 DuPont Parkway in St. Georges Hundred, near Odessa, Delaware
- Coordinates: 39.491366°N 75.650498°W
- Area: 1.4 acres (0.57 ha)
- Built: c. 1814, c. 1825
- NRHP reference No.: 78000902
- Added to NRHP: December 12, 1978

Comdr. Thomas MacDonough House, also known as The Trap, is a historic home located near Odessa in New Castle County, Delaware, United States. It was built in several sections. The two main sections are two stories and consists of a three-bay brick section dated to the mid-18th century and a three bay frame section built between 1820 and 1830. Later-19th century additions to the house include frame one-and 1 1/2-story wings to the south gable end wall and southwest rear wall. Also on the property is a contributing farm building complex, including a shed, root cellar, and privy. It was the home of Commander Thomas MacDonough (1783-1825), an early-19th-century American naval officer noted for his roles in the First Barbary War and the War of 1812.

It was listed on the National Register of Historic Places in 1978.
