= John McDonogh (hurler) =

Irish hurler

Personal information
- Native name: Seán Mac Donncha (Irish)
- Born: 1941 Ballysimon, Limerick, Ireland
- Died: 12 September 2012 (aged 71) Castletroy, Limerick, Ireland
- Occupation: Farmer

Sport
- Sport: Hurling
- Position: Full-back
Club
- Years: Club
- St Patrick's
Club titles
- Limerick titles: 0
Inter-county*
Years	County	Apps (scores)
1963-1970	Limerick	9 (0-00)
Inter-county titles
- Munster titles: 0
- All-Irelands: 0
- NHL: 0
- *Inter County team apps and scores correct as of 01:36, 23 June 2015.

John McDonogh (1941 - 12 September 2012) was an Irish hurler who played as full-back for the Limerick senior team.

Born in Ballysimon, Limerick, McDonogh first arrived on the inter-county scene at the age of sixteen when he first linked up with the Limerick minor team. He joined the senior panel during the 1963 championship. McDonogh was a regular member of the team over the next few years, however, he ended his career without any major success.

At club level McDonogh hurling and Gaelic football with St. Patrick's.

McDonogh's son, Stephen, also played with Limerick.

Throughout his career McDonogh made 9 championship appearances. His retirement came following the conclusion of the 1970 championship.

== Honours ==
=== Team ===
Limerick

- All-Ireland Minor Hurling Championship (1): 1958
- Munster Minor Hurling Championship (1): 1958
