= William Joseph McDonough =

American economist (1934–2018)

William McDonough
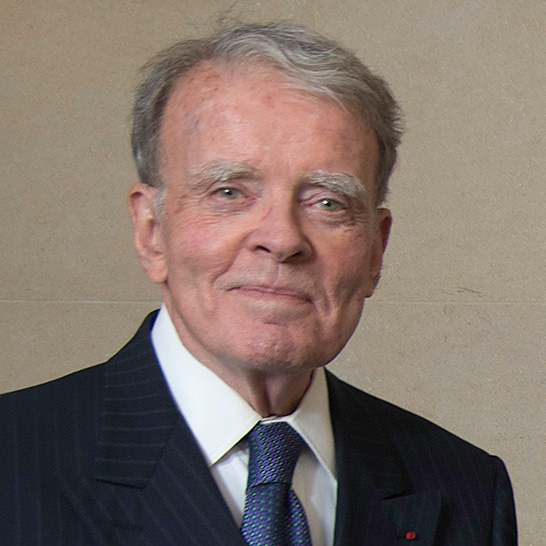
- McDonough in 2014

President of the Federal Reserve Bank of New York
- In office July 19, 1993 – July 21, 2003
- Preceded by: E. Gerald Corrigan
- Succeeded by: Timothy F. Geithner

Personal details
- Born: William Joseph McDonough; April 21, 1934 Chicago, Illinois, U.S.
- Died: January 22, 2018 (aged 83) Waccabuc, New York, U.S.
- Education: College of the Holy Cross (BS); Georgetown University (MA)

William Joseph McDonough (April 21, 1934 – January 22, 2018) was an American economist. He was president and CEO of the Federal Reserve Bank of New York from 1993 to 2003. He was also on the board of the Bank for International Settlements and chairman of the Basel Committee on Banking Supervision.

Prior to joining the Fed, McDonough had a six-year career with the U.S. State Department followed by a 22-year career at First Chicago Corporation. After leaving the Fed he was the first chairman of the Public Company Accounting Oversight Board for three years, and then became vice chairman and senior advisor to the CEO at Merrill Lynch in early 2006, retiring at the end of 2009.

== Early life and education ==
McDonough was born on April 21, 1934, in the West Side of Chicago, Illinois, to immigrants from Ireland. His mother died when he was 10, and his father, who worked as an insurance salesman, died within the following year, leaving McDonough orphaned by the age of 11. He subsequently went to live with an aunt and supported himself financially by delivering newspapers.

McDonough's three sisters helped pay the tuition for his first year at Campion High School in Prairie du Chien, Wisconsin. At Campion, he finished first in his class in each of his four years there. His academic performance helped him gain admission to the College of the Holy Cross in Worcester, Massachusetts, where he graduated with a Bachelor of Science, cum laude, in economics in 1956. As an undergraduate at Holy Cross, McDonough served as the vice-president of the college's Alpha Sigma Nu chapter and was the editor-in-chief of its yearbook, The Purple, and a member of the ROTC.

After graduating from Holy Cross, McDonough served as an officer in the United States Navy from 1956 to 1961. His naval service included duty aboard a destroyer and a posting at Pearl Harbor, after which he taught at the United States Naval Academy. During his service, he served as the chief engineer of a navy vessel. He then earned a master's degree in economics from Georgetown University in 1962.

== Career ==
=== Early career ===
He was with the U.S. State Department from 1961 to 1967, and became fluent in Spanish and French. He was sent to Uruguay as a diplomat, and also worked in Washington D.C. on Latin American policy.

First Chicago Corporation and its bank, First National Bank of Chicago, needed someone with economic skills and international experience, and hired McDonough in 1967. First Chicago initially sent him to Paris and then London, before bringing him back to the head office in the U.S., where he rose to vice chairman of the corporation in 1986. Concluding he was unlikely to become CEO of the firm, McDonough retired from First Chicago in 1989 after a 22-year career there.

Before joining the Federal Reserve Bank of New York, McDonough worked as a consultant and did charity work for several years.

=== Federal Reserve Bank of New York ===
In 1992, McDonough was hired by the Federal Reserve Bank of New York as an executive vice president and head of markets. The bank's foreign exchange and domestic market operations were consolidated and placed under his direction. He was in charge of the bank's open market operations.

He served as president and chief executive officer of the Federal Reserve Bank of New York from July 1993 to July 2003. As president of the New York Fed, he also automatically served as the vice chairman and a permanent member of the Federal Open Market Committee, which makes decisions about interest rates.

McDonough also served on the board of directors of the Bank for International Settlements, and as chairman of the Basel Committee on Banking Supervision. While he was chairman of the Basel Committee on Banking Supervision from 1998 to 2003, the McDonough ratio, which revised the former Cooke ratio of weighting risks versus solvency, was introduced and became part of the Basel II accords in 2004.

As president of the Federal Reserve Bank of New York, McDonough guided the New York Fed through the 1997 Asian financial crisis, and helped ensure that international banks kept credit flowing to South Korea during that period. He oversaw the institution’s preparations for guarding against a Y2K computer-conversion market failure at the onset of the year 2000. And he oversaw stabilizing the Federal Reserve and the U.S. financial system in the immediate aftermath of the September 11 attacks in 2001. He was also a strong supporter of chairman Alan Greenspan's decision in 1994 to begin announcing the Federal Reserve's interest rate decisions.

His most controversial action was brokering a private-sector bailout in 1998 of Long-Term Capital Management, a large hedge fund which had amassed billions of dollars in debt and whose imminent bankruptcy threatened to spark a contagion of investor panic.

In speeches he made during his tenure at the Fed, he criticized the ballooning compensation of corporate CEOs, the excess risk being increasingly taken on Wall Street, and the growing income inequality in the U.S.

=== Career post-Fed ===
In 2003, immediately after leaving the New York Fed, McDonough was appointed as the first chairman of the Public Company Accounting Oversight Board, a U.S. non-profit regulatory entity created by the Sarbanes-Oxley Act of 2002 to oversee audits of public companies and broker-dealers. He resigned the post towards the end of 2005.

In January 2006, he was appointed vice chairman of Merrill Lynch and as a senior advisor to its CEO Stanley O'Neal. He was responsible for advising senior management in the company's business development efforts with governments and financial institutions. He retired from Bank of America, which acquired Merrill Lynch, at the end of 2009.

== Additional posts ==
McDonough was vice chairman of the Council on Foreign Relations, where he had been a director since 1995.

He was chairman of the Economic Club of New York from 1996 to 2000.

In 2004 he was elected to the board of advisors of the Yale School of Management.

He was chairman of the board of the Investment Committee for the United Nations Joint Staff Pension Fund, and was co-chairman of the United Nations Association of the United States of America (UNA-USA). He was also an emeritus member of the Group of Thirty, an influential Washington-based financial advisory body.

He was also a member of the board of directors of the New York Philharmonic Orchestra.

== Personal life ==
McDonough died January 22, 2018, at the age of 83, at his home in Waccabuc, New York in Westchester County. He was survived by his wife, Suzanne Clarke McDonough, and six children from a former marriage.

Other offices
Preceded by E. Gerald Corrigan	President of the Federal Reserve Bank of New York; 1993–2003	Succeeded by Timothy Geithner
