= Thomas Macdonough =

United States Navy officer (1783–1825)

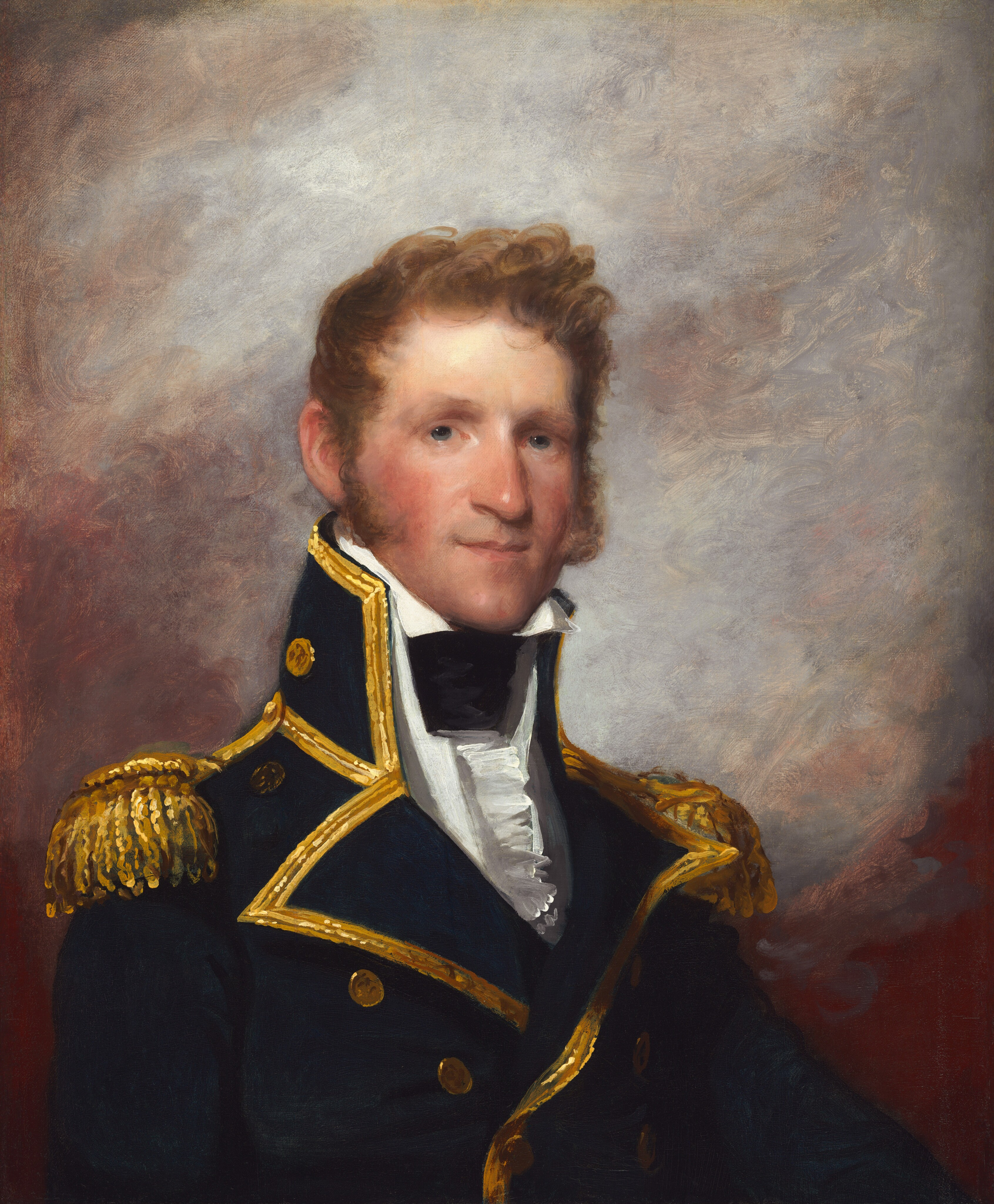
- Portrait by Gilbert Stuart, c. 1815–1818
- Born: December 30, 1783; The Trap, New Castle County, Delaware, U.S.
- Died: November 10, 1825 (aged 41); At sea aboard USS Edwin, near Gibraltar
- Burial place: Middletown, Connecticut, U.S.
- Relatives: Thomas Macdonough, Sr. (father); James Macdonough (brother); Augustus Rodney Macdonough (son)
- Military career
- Allegiance: United States
- Branch: United States Navy
- Service years: 1800–1810; 1812–1825
- Rank: Captain
- Commands: Lake Champlain squadron; Commandant, Portsmouth Naval Shipyard 1815‑18; USS Guerriere; USS Constitution
- Conflicts: Quasi War; First Barbary War; Battle of Tripoli Harbor; War of 1812; Battle of Lake Champlain
- Awards: Congressional Gold Medal

Thomas Macdonough, Jr. (December 31, 1783 – November 10, 1825) was a United States Navy officer noted for his roles in the First Barbary War and the War of 1812. He was the son of a revolutionary officer, Thomas Macdonough, Sr. who lived near Middletown, Delaware.

He was the sixth child from a family of ten siblings and was raised in the countryside. He entered naval life at an early age, receiving a midshipman's commission at the age of sixteen.

Serving with Stephen Decatur at Tripoli, he was a member of "Preble's Boys", a select group of U.S. naval officers who served under the command of Commodore Preble during the First Barbary War. Macdonough achieved fame during the War of 1812, commanding the American naval forces that overpowered a British squadron at the Battle of Lake Champlain, part of the larger Battle of Plattsburgh.

== Early life ==
Major Thomas Macdonough Sr., Captain Thomas Macdonough's father, lived at a farm referred to as "The Trap" (also spelled 'Trapp'), in the county of New Castle, Delaware.

Macdonough's great-grandfather, also named Thomas Macdonough, lived in Leinster, Ireland in the Salmon Leap district not far from Dublin. His surname derives from the Gaelic Mac Donnchadha meaning son of donnachada- brown warrior. Traditionally the surname is very common among Gaelic Irish, who before The American Revolution, fought against William of Orange and Oliver Cromwell to free Ireland from Protestant British occupation. He was of the Protestant faith and succeeding generations were connected with the Episcopal Church in the United States.

Thomas Macdonough Jr. was born in a small town near Odessa, which later was named MacDonough, Delaware, in his honor.

He was a major in the Continental Army. He was employed in Middletown as a clerk upon the return of his brother James, who lost a leg in a naval battle with a French vessel in 1799 during the Quasi-War with France. Shortly after, Macdonough requested a commission with the United States Navy with the assistance of Senator Latimer from the state of Delaware.

Macdonough was a tall, dignified man with a commanding character which suited him well for military service. He was a devoutly religious man of Episcopal faith, as were his parents and greater family. He was known to adhere to a set of steadfast principles in his personal and military life. He received a contemporary education here but it remains uncertain if he attended any sort of formal schools or was taught by family members or a tutor.

Before joining the Navy, Thomas, Jr., for unknown reasons, changed the spelling of his last name from "McDonough" to "Macdonough.

On May 27, 1800, at the age of sixteen, Macdonough secured a warrant and served as a midshipman aboard the 24-gun USS Ganges, a corvette class ship, converted over from a merchantman vessel and outfitted as a man-of-war.

Under the command of Captain John Mullowny, Ganges then set sail for the West Indies. During operations there she captured three French merchant ships between May and September. When hostilities between the United States and France had finally ended the following year on October 20, 1801, Macdonough was assigned to USS Constellation, a 38-gun frigate.

Commanded by Alexander Murray, Constellation was about to embark on its mission in the Mediterranean sea. While serving aboard Constellation he received a thorough education from Murray in seamanship, navigation, gunnery, and other nautical sciences towards improving his service as a junior officer.

== First Barbary War ==
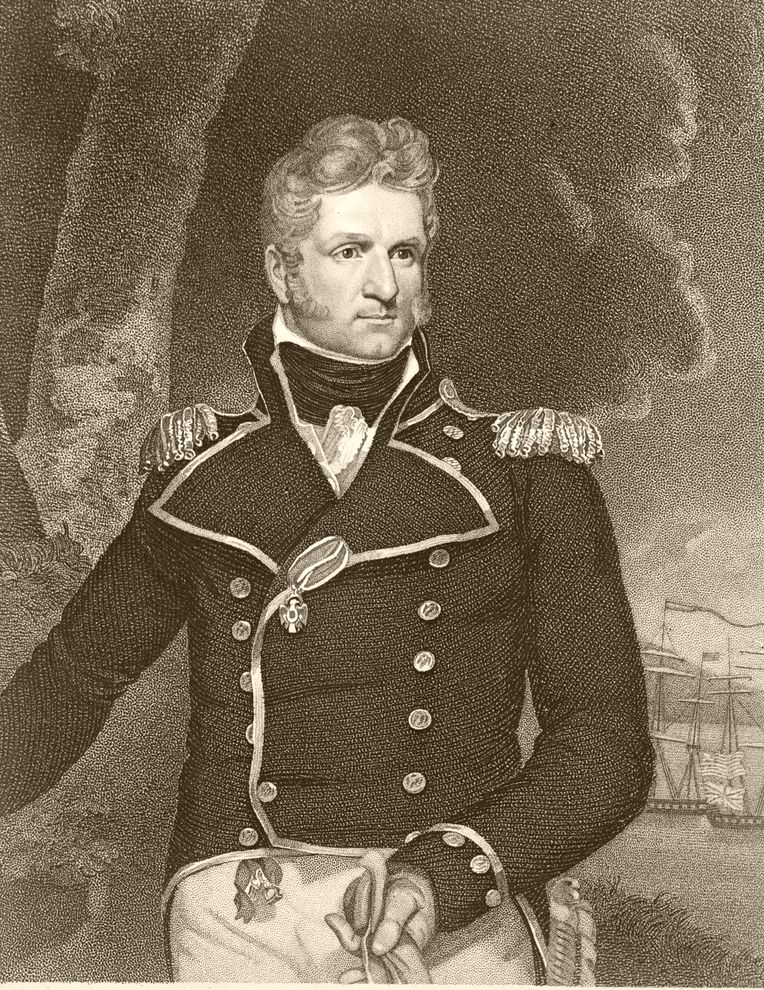
Thomas Macdonough Engraving by John Wesley Jarvis

Aboard Constellation in January 1802, Macdonough served with distinction in naval operations against Tripoli during the First Barbary War. This was the same ship that his brother James had served on a few years earlier.

In 1803, Navy Secretary Robert Smith selected Macdonough to serve aboard USS Philadelphia, a 38-gun frigate, commanded by William Bainbridge. Macdonough was aboard this ship when it captured the Moroccan ship Mirboka on August 26, 1803. Shortly before Philadelphia ran aground and was consequently captured by the Tripolitans, Macdonough had gone ashore on leave. He was reassigned on October 31 to the 12-gun sloop USS Enterprise under the command of Lieutenant Stephen Decatur. Macdonough volunteered to join Decatur's successful raid into the harbor of Tripoli. On February 6, 1804, they succeeded in burning and destroying Philadelphia.

Having just served on Philadelphia, Macdonough's familiarity made his role in the operation a crucial one. For his heroic actions he was promoted to acting lieutenant.

Macdonough also accompanied Decatur when they hunted down the murderer of Decatur's brother, James Decatur, who was killed by the commander when he boarded a Tripolitan ship that had pretended to be surrendering. After catching up with and pulling alongside the ship involved, Decatur was the first to board the enemy vessel with Midshipman Macdonough at his heels along with nine volunteer crew members. Decatur, Macdonough and the rest of the crew were outnumbered 5 to 1 but were determined, organized and kept their form, fighting furiously side by side, killing the commander and most of the crew along with capturing the Tripolitan ship.

== Other service ==
After winning promotion to Lieutenant for his participation in the raid on Philadelphia, Macdonough served aboard the 18-gun brig USS Syren, the same vessel assisting Intrepid at Tripoli. Assisting Isaac Hull, he then supervised the construction of several gunboats in Middletown, Connecticut. In January 1806, Macdonough was promoted to a commission of Lieutenant.

As commander of the 18-gun USS Wasp, Macdonough served patrolling waters near Great Britain and various points in the Mediterranean. He returned to America and enforced the Embargo Act, and the Atlantic blockade, from 1807 and 1808.

In 1809, he served with Captain Smith aboard USS Essex, but later requested reassignment. Macdonough returned to Middletown, Connecticut, and was placed in charge of the several gunboats there. In Middletown Macdonough met his future wife, Ann Shaler.

With the repeal of the Embargo Act, the role of the navy became less active, with a fifth of its officers away on furlough at half pay. Macdonough remained in Middleton for only eight months before requesting a furlough in June 1810. From 1810 to 1812, Macdonough took a leave of absence for two years as the captain of a British merchantman that was en route to India.

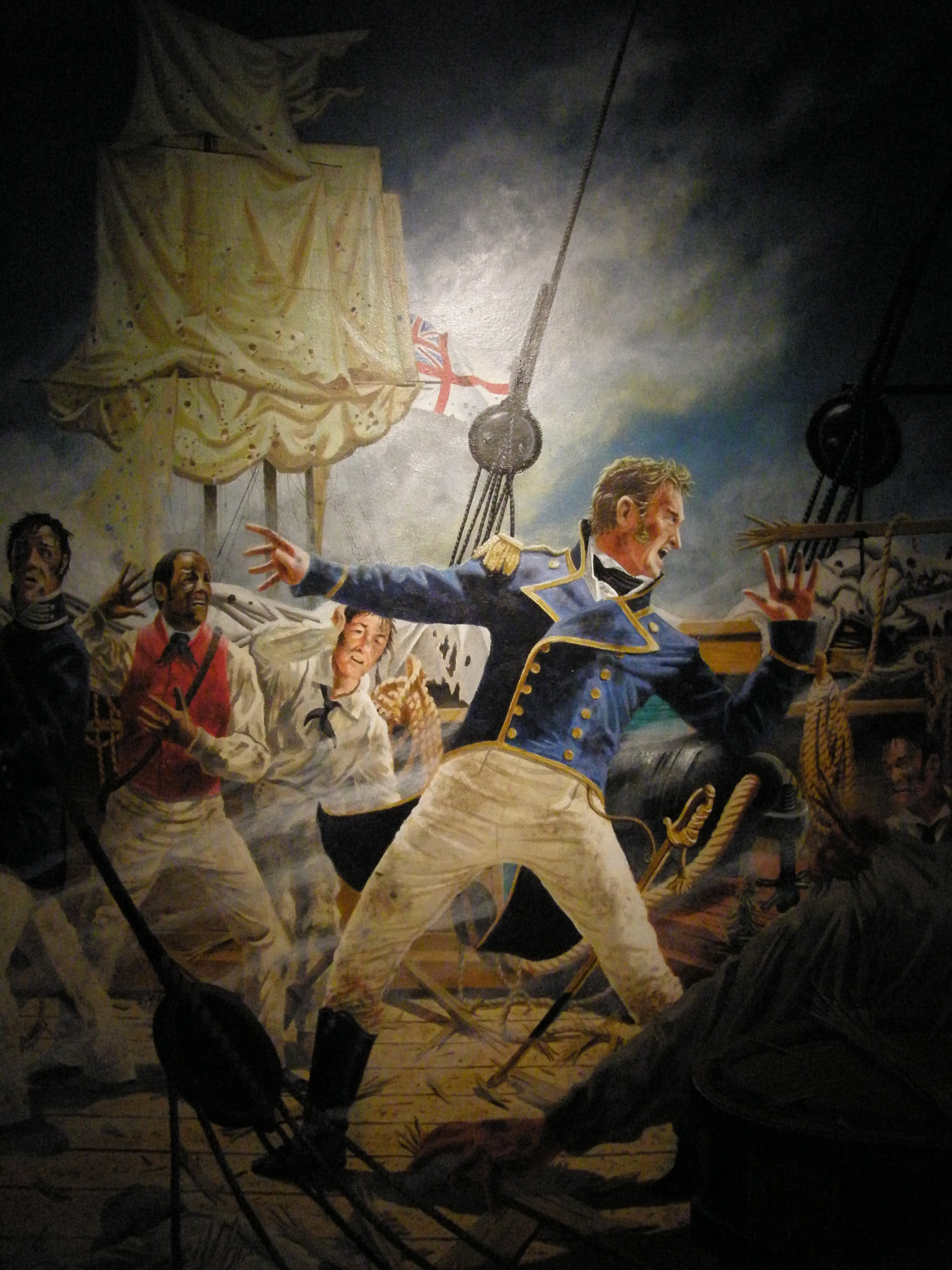
Painting of MacDonough inside the War of 1812 Museum in Plattsburgh

== War of 1812 ==
At the beginning of the War of 1812 American naval forces were very small, allowing the British to make many advances into the Great Lakes and northern New York waterways. The roles played by commanders like Oliver Hazard Perry at Lake Erie and Isaac Chauncey at Lake Ontario and Thomas Macdonough at Lake Champlain all proved vital to the naval effort on the lakes that was largely responsible for preserving American territory during that war.

Assigned to USS Constellation, as First Lieutenant, Macdonough returned to active service just prior to the outbreak of the war in June 1812. The ship at this time was being outfitted and supplied in Washington, DC, for its next mission, but was still months away from being ready. Moreover, it did not escape from the British blockade at the Chesapeake Bay until 1814.

Requesting transfer to a more active front, Macdonough was assigned the command of a squadron of gunboats defending Portland, Maine. His stay there was brief when he received new orders from Secretary of the Navy Hamilton. Macdonough was reassigned to Burlington, Vermont to command U.S. naval forces in Lake Champlain in October 1812.

Taking leave from his assignment at Lake Champlain, Macdonough married Lucy Anne Shaler on December 12, 1812, at the Christ Church in Middletown by Bishop Abraham Jarvis.

On June 2, 1813, Macdonough sent Lieutenant Sidney Smith with USS Growler, along with Sailing Master Loomis with USS Eagle, to guard against British advances at the Canada–US border at the Richelieu River. The impatient Smith sailed into British waters, an action which was contrary to his orders, and at once found himself overpowered by the British squadron. After enduring four hours of battle, Smith was finally forced into surrendering.

=== Lake Champlain Campaign ===
On July 24, 1813, Macdonough was promoted to the rank of master commandant.

When the war began in 1812, there were only two American naval vessels on Lake Champlain, Growler and Eagle, each carrying ten guns with a crew of fifty. On June 3, 1813, the two vessels were pursuing a British gunboat but were caught up in a strong current that prevented them from maintaining their heading and position, giving the advantage to British forces, resulting in their capture. The loss of the two and only American vessels on the lake gave undisputed control of this strategic waterway to the British. This prompted Macdonough to begin the construction of the corvette Saratoga and new sloop Eagle and several gunboats at the shipyard in Otter Creek at Vergennes, Vermont. While construction was underway, Ticonderoga, a schooner, was being converted to a warship carrying seventeen guns.

In 1814 the ice covering Lake Champlain, which usually lasted well into May, began melting and breaking up early in April. Macdonough feared that the British, who he assumed by now knew of the ship construction going on there, would use the opportunity to capture or destroy the vessels being built. Having learned of Macdonough's ship building activity, the British constructed a heavily armed brig and five large gunboats at 'Isle Aux Noix' over the winter. As Macdonough had predicted, British forces attempted to navigate the lake. Because of unfavorable winds, the British commander Daniel Pring, whose forces were based at Isle Aux Noix in upper Lake Champlain, didn't complete the 65-mile journey to Otter Creek until May 14. Upon arrival, Pring situated his squadron in the lake just off Otter Creek with eight galleys and a bomb sloop, preventing the American forces' passage north and to the sea. For one hour, Commander Pring maintained a heavy fire. However, Macdonough had learned of the attack beforehand from his observers on land and had prepared a defense in anticipation of this likely event. Using the guns of his ships, he had them landed on shore at the mouth of Otter Creek.

Macdonough constructed an artillery battery with which he repelled the attack and drove the Royal Navy back to Isle Aux Noix in Canadian waters by autumn. With the way now clear, Macdonough's squadron sailed out of Otter Creek and made its way to Plattsburgh, New York, where it anchored just off shore in anticipation of the next and inevitable British advance.

=== Battle of Plattsburgh ===
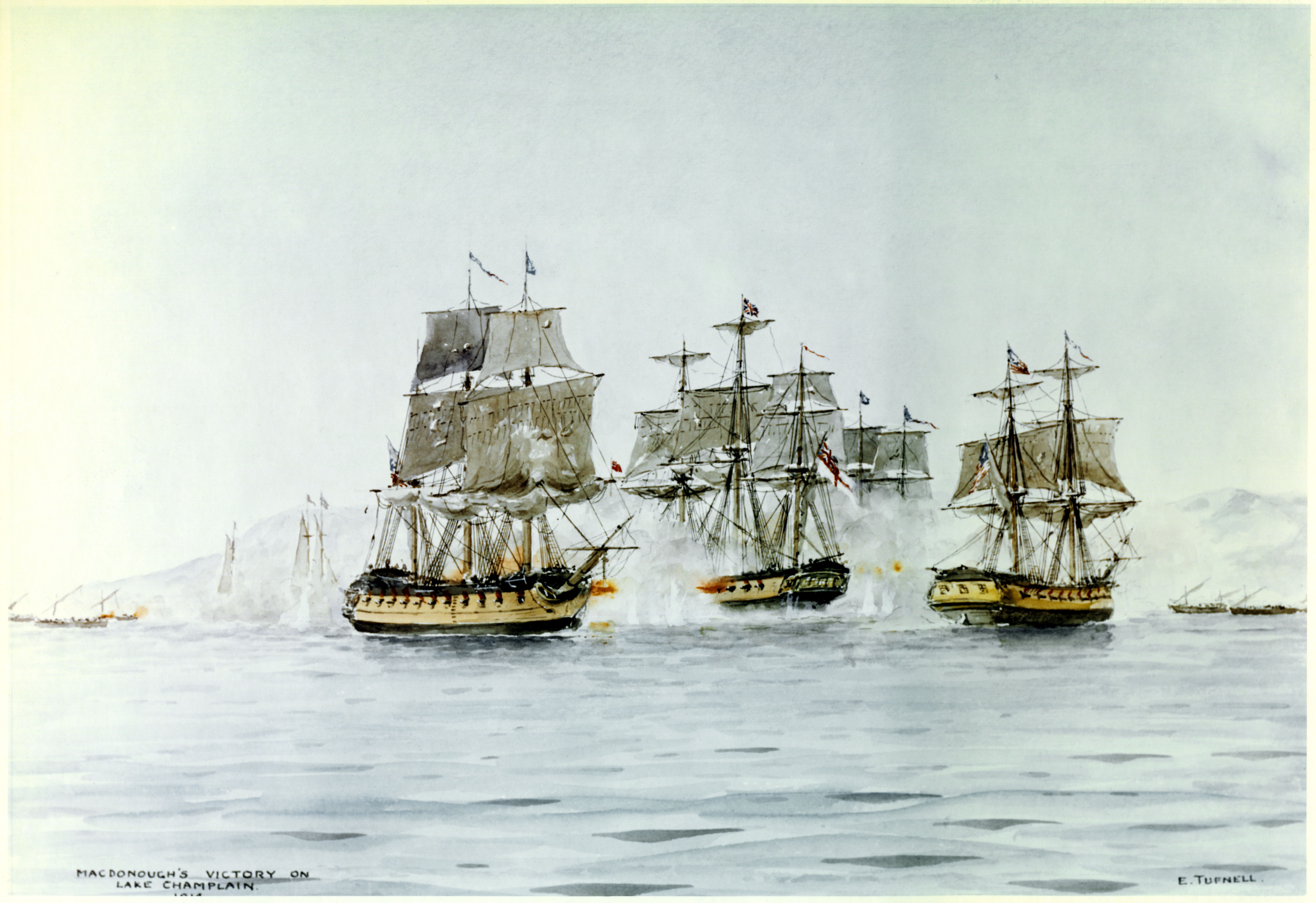
Macdonough's Saratoga (left) and Eagle (right) engaging Confiance.

By late August 1814, approximately 10,000 British troops under the command of George Prevost had assembled near Montreal at the Canada–US border. Many of these soldiers were well-trained, regular troops who served under Wellington, already battle hardened from their recent defeat of Napoleon in Europe. Macdonough had little naval combat experience. His service in the Barbary wars was limited to gunboat actions and the capture and destruction of Philadelphia.

He had yet to experience a ship-to-ship action, being on a vessel that was receiving broadsides, surrounded by dead and wounded men. Regardless of this lack in experience, Macdonough well understood that defending and holding Plattsburgh, thus not allowing General Macomb's troops to be surrounded by British forces on land and water, was vital to victory in the campaign. On September 3, Prevost's army crossed the border and marched into northern New York State, advancing on Plattsburgh.

The city was held by General Macomb with less than 2,000 regular troops, with the support of the New York militia, under the command of General Mooers and the Vermont volunteers, under the command of General Strong. However, Prevost who had arrived in earnest was yet aware of enemy strength and positions and refused to march on the city itself without adequate naval support to divert the American forces. A squadron under the command of Commodore George Downie sailed southward into the open lake to engage the American squadron commanded by Macdonough. In anticipation of the British squadron, Macdonough strategically positioned and anchored his ships a short distance off shore from Plattsburgh and made further preparations for Downie's advance.

On September 11, Downie's forces departed from Isle-aux-Noix and sailed southward along the Richelieu River into Lake Champlain. Upon encountering Macdonough's squadron waiting in Plattsburgh harbor, Downie immediately attacked, achieving the upper hand early in the battle, largely because of the firepower of the 16-gun British flagship HMS Confiance. As the battle unfolded, the British squadron incurred considerable damage from close-range cannon fire. In the process an American cannon shot blasted one of Confiance's cannon off its mount, crushing and killing Downie. Through use of anchor and cable tactics, Macdonough in command of Saratoga was able to swing his ship around the undamaged side of Confiance, gaining firepower superiority over the British squadron. As the poorly and hurriedly equipped Confiance with its inexperienced crew attempted the same tactic, Macdonough seized the opportunity and fired a broadside, severely damaging Confiance and forcing its surrender. Having removed Confiance from action, American forces captured or destroyed the remaining ships in the squadron.

Both commanders would have seen the parallels of Macdonough's anchorage on Lake Champlain to that of the French under Vice-Admiral Francois-Paul Brueys, opposing British Rear-Admiral Sir Horatio Nelson, at the Battle of the Nile in Aboukir Bay on August 1, 1798.

A study of Nelson's battles was part of the professional knowledge expected of naval commanders. But Macdonough did all that Brueys did not. He expected to take advantage of the prevailing winds on Lake Champlain that constrained Downie's axis of approach. "Because nearly every circumstance that worked to Nelson's advantage proved disadvantageous to Downie, the Battle of Lake Champlain is sometimes called the False Nile" by British sources. British naval historian William Laird Clowes regarded Macdonough's False Nile victory as "a most notable feat, one which, on the whole, surpassed that of any other captain of either navy in this war." Roosevelt claimed that the "British sailors on the lakes were as good as our own, but no better. None of their commanders compare with Macdonough."

After the battle, Macdonough returned to the British officers their swords. Captain Pring wrote:

I have much satisfaction in making you acquainted with the humane treatment the wounded have received from Commodore Macdonough; they were immediately removed to his own hospital on Crab Island, and furnished with every requisite. His generous and polite attention to myself, the officers, and men, will ever hereafter be gratefully remembered.

— Captain Pring

Upon wresting control of Lake Champlain from the British, Macdonough's victory forced the British forces to retire to Canada, the actions of which left no grounds for any claims by the British for any territory when the Ghent peace conference convened on December 24. For his success in forcing the retreat of Prevost into Canada, Macdonough was duly promoted to the rank of captain.

He was also awarded the Congressional Gold Medal at this time. He was also awarded by the State of New York a thousand acres of land in Cayuga county, with another hundred acres awarded to him from the State of Vermont, making the once modest commodore a wealthy man.

== Later days ==
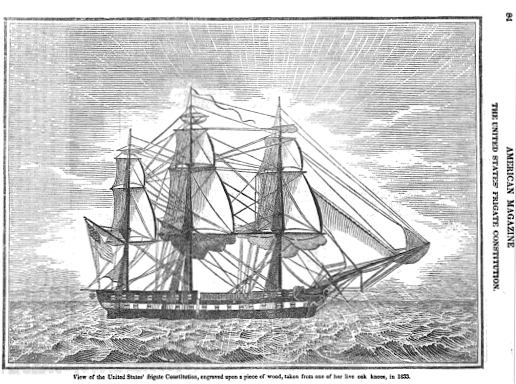
USS Constitution, painted 1934

Macdonough relieved Isaac Hull of command of the Portsmouth Navy Yard on July 1, 1815. In command there for three years, he returned to the Mediterranean Squadron in 1818 and was appointed commander of USS Guerriere, a frigate of 44 guns, and later transported Hon. G.W. Campbell to the Court of St. Petersburg in Russia stopping in ports in England, Elsineur and Copenhagen along the way.

In April Macdonough was stricken with tuberculosis but he still remained on duty for as long as possible. After returning to America later in the year, he was given command of USS Ohio a ship of the line, bearing 74 guns under construction in New York harbor. From 1818 to 1823 Macdonough served as her captain. In the fall of 1822 Macdonough toured western New York State visiting Niagara Falls and then battling the rapids sailed down the St. Lawrence River to Quebec in a batteau.

After submitting several requests for active sea duty, Macdonough received command of the 44-gun frigate USS Constitution in 1824. However, his health continued to worsen. On October 14, 1825, Macdonough had to relieve himself of his command. On October 14 he turned command of Constitution over to Captain Daniel T. Patterson at Gibraltar. Intending to return to New York, Macdonough departed the Mediterranean in the merchant brig USS Edwin. The day before his death, in the presence of Dr. Turk, Macdonough drew up and signed a will leaving a small sum of money to his servant, his wife having died several months beforehand. On November 10, 1825, Thomas Macdonough died aboard ship while it was passing Gibraltar.

Macdonough's body was returned to the United States and was buried in Middletown, Connecticut. He was laid to rest alongside his wife Ann Shaler, a lady of a prominent family in Middletown, she having died just a few months earlier.

== Legacy ==
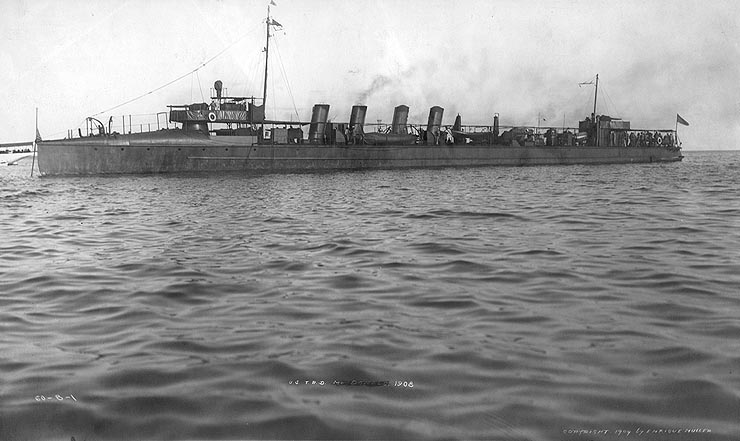
The first USS Macdonough, 1900

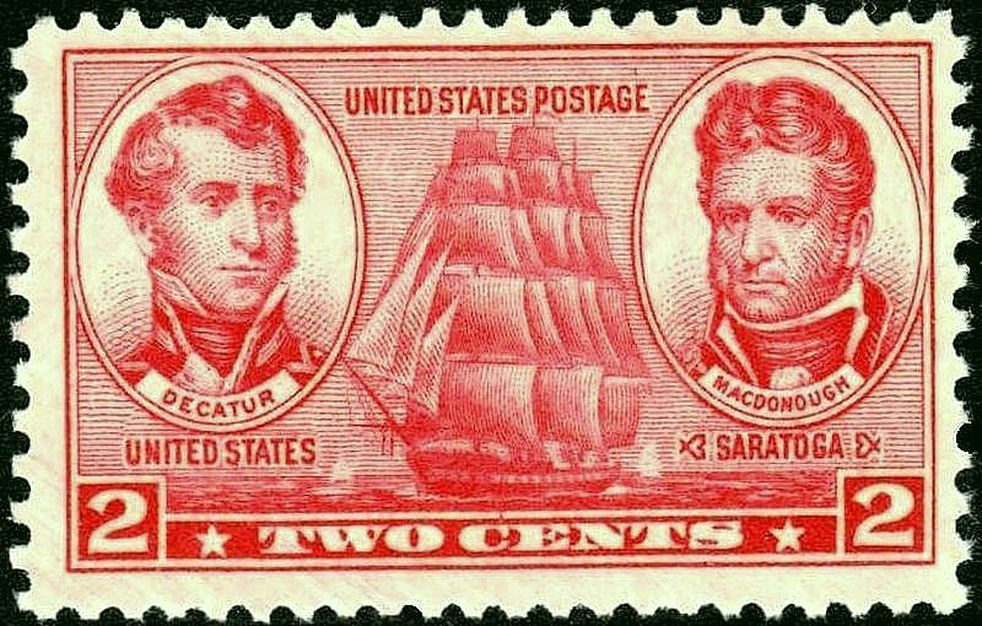
Decatur ~ Macdonough U.S. postage, Navy Issue of 1937

Macdonough in this battle won a higher fame than any other commander of the war, British or American. He had a decidedly superior force to contend against, the officers and men of the two sides being about on a par in every respect; and it was solely owing to his foresight and resource that we won the victory. He forced the British to engage at a disadvantage by his excellent choice of position; and he prepared beforehand for every possible contingency. His personal prowess had already been shown at the cost of the rovers of Tripoli, and in this action he helped fight the guns as ably as the best sailor. His skill, seamanship, quick eye, readiness of resource, and indomitable pluck, are beyond all praise. Down to the time of the Civil War he is the greatest figure in our naval history.

— Theodore Roosevelt, 1882

- Several U.S. Navy ships have been named USS Macdonough in his honor.
- In 1937, at the urging of Franklin D. Roosevelt, the U.S. Post Office issued a series of five postage stamps honoring the U.S. Navy and various naval heroes in American history. Stephen Decatur and Thomas Macdonough (right) appearing on the two-cent denomination, were among the few chosen to appear in this commemorative series.
- The annual Commodore Macdonough sailboat race (a nonstop 74-nautical-mile (137 km) overnight event sponsored by the Lake Champlain Yacht Club of Shelburne, Vermont) has been held on the lake every September since 1968.
- The State University of New York at Plattsburgh has a dormitory named Macdonough Hall, the initial and oldest dorm building.
- McDonough, New York, is named after Thomas Macdonough.
- Macdonough Hall, at the United States Naval Academy, is home to the boxing, sprint football, water polo, and gymnastics programs, as well as housing a gymnasium, racquetball courts, a swimming pool, and recreational weight rooms for Midshipmen.
- In 1925, a Macdonough Monument was erected in the city green in Vergennes, Vermont, to commemorate the building of the USS Saratoga and other ships at Otter Creek that were used in the Battle of Plattsburgh. Vergennes Union High School's mascot is the Commodores, and their gym is called the Commodore Thomas Macdonough Gymnasium.
- In 1926, a 135-foot-tall (41 m) obelisk, known as the Macdonough Monument, was dedicated to honor the victory of American soldiers and sailors in the Battle of Plattsburgh. It is located across from City Hall in Plattsburgh, N.Y. In August 2026, the City of Plattsburgh celebrated the 100th anniversary of the monument with a commemoration event.
- Camano Island (formerly known as Macdonough Island), Washington. Charles Wilkes, during the Wilkes Expedition of 1838–1842, named the island in honor of Macdonough in tribute to his victory at the Battle of Plattsburgh (aka Battle of Lake Champlain) that ended the War of 1812.
- McDonough County, Illinois, is named after Thomas Macdonough, its seat being Macomb.
- Two elementary schools, one in St. Georges, Delaware, and one in Middletown, Connecticut, are named in honor of Macdonough.
- MacDonough Street in the Stuyvesant Heights section of Brooklyn, New York, is named after Thomas Macdonough. MacDonough Street runs parallel to Decatur Street, one block away, named after Stephen Decatur, with whom Macdonough served during the Barbary War.
- McDonough, the county seat of Henry County, Georgia, is named in honor of Macdonough.
- McDonough Street in Montgomery, Alabama, is named for Macdonough. It runs parallel to streets named after other Barbary War/War of 1812 naval Heroes: Bainbridge Street, named for William Bainbridge; Decatur Street, named for Stephen Decatur; Hull Street, named for Isaac Hull; Lawrence Street, named for James Lawrence and Perry Street, named for Oliver Hazard Perry.
- The Comdr. Thomas MacDonough House was listed on the National Register of Historic Places in 1978.
- In October 1814 a fort was constructed on Westport Island, Maine near Clough Point and named after Thomas MacDonough (McDonough) the fort was active till the end of the war of 1812.

== See also ==
- Other notable naval commanders of the time : John Paul Jones • Commodore John Barry • Commodore Stephen Decatur • Commodore John Hazelwood • Admiral David Farragut • Admiral Richard Howe • Admiral Horatio Nelson
- Bibliography of early American naval history: Thomas Macdonough
- Bibliography of early American naval history: War of 1812
- List of sailing frigates of the United States Navy
- History of the United States Navy
- Naval tactics in the Age of Sail
- Naval artillery in the Age of Sail

== Bibliography ==
- Abbot, Willis John (1886). The Naval History of the United States. New York: Peter Fenelon Collier.
- Barnes, James (1896). Naval actions of the War of 1812. Harper & Brothers, New York. p. 263.
- Frost, John (1845). The pictorial book of the commodores: comprising lives of distinguished commanders in the navy of the United States. New York: Nafis and Cornish. pp. 432. ISBN 1-55750-839-9.
- Hagan, Kenneth J. (1992). This People's Navy: The Making of American Sea Power. Touchstone. ISBN 978-0-02-913471-9.
- Heidler, David Stephen (2004). Encyclopedia of the War of 1812. Annapolis, Md.: Naval Institute Press. p. 636. ISBN 1-59114-362-4.
- Hill, Frederic Stanhope (1905). Twenty-six historic ships. New York and London: G. P. Putnam's Sons. pp. 515.
- Holden, James A. (1914). The Centenary of the Battle of Plattsburg. Albany NY: The University of the State of New York.
- Latimer, Jon (2007). 1812: War with America. Cambridge, MA: Harvard University Press. p. 637. ISBN 978-0-674-02584-4.
- Lewis, Charles Lee (1924). Famous American Naval Officers. L. C. Page & Company, Inc. p. 444. ISBN 0-8369-2170-4.
- Loubat, Joseph Florimond (1881). The medallic history of the United States of America, 1776–1876, Volume 1. Published by Author, New York. p. 488.
- Macdonough, Rodney (1909). Life of Commodore Thomas Macdonough, U. S. Navy. Boston, MA: The Fort Hill Press. pp. 303.
- MacKenzie, Alexander Slidell (1846). Life of Stephen Decatur: A Commodore in the Navy of the United States. C. C. Little and J. Brown, 1846 – Biography & Autobiography – 443 pages.
- Maclay, Edgar Stanton (1894). A history of the United States Navy, from 1775 to 1893. New York: D. Appleton & Company. pp. 647.
- Mahon, John H. (1972). The War of 1812. Da Capo Press, in arrangement with University of Florida Press. p. 496. ISBN 0-306-80429-8.
- Malcomson, Robert (1991). Historical Dictionary of the War of 1812. Lanham, Maryland: Scarecrow Press. p. 701. ISBN 978-0-8108-6516-7.
- Skaggs, David Curtis (2003). Thomas Macdonough: Master of Command in the Early U.S. Navy. Annapolis, MD: Naval Institute Press. p. 257. ISBN 1-55750-839-9.
- Potter, E. B.; Nimitz, Chester W. (1960). "The War of 1812". Sea Power: A Naval History (First ed.). Englewood Cliffs, NJ: Prentice-Hall, Inc.
- Roosevelt, Theodore (1889) [1882]. The Naval War of 1812, Or The History of the United States Navy during the Last War with Great Britain to Which Is Appended an Account of the Battle of New Orleans (Tenth ed.). New York: G. P. Putnam's Sons.
- Tucker, Spencer (2004). Stephen Decatur: A Life Most Bold and Daring. Annapolis, Maryland: Naval Institute Press. p. 245. ISBN 1-55750-999-9.
