= Macdonough Craven =

American naval officer, engineer, and politician (1858–1919)

Street Cleaning Commissioner of New York City
- In office October 22, 1906 – July 8, 1907
- Preceded by: John McGaw Woodbury
- Succeeded by: Walter Bensel

Personal details
- Born: Macdonough Craven; November 9, 1858 Annapolis, Maryland, U.S.
- Died: February 10, 1919 (aged 60) Bay Ridge, Brooklyn, New York City, New York
- Resting place: Green-Wood Cemetery, New York City, New York
- Party: Non-political
- Education: United States Naval Academy
- Profession: Naval officer Politician; Engineer

Military service
- Allegiance: United States of America; Brazil
- Branch/service: United States Navy; Brazilian Navy
- Years of service: 1876–1883; 1898 (United States); 1894 (Brazil)
- Rank: Lieutenant
- Battles/wars: Spanish–American War

Macdonough Craven, often mistaken as MacDonough Craven and McDonough Craven, (November 11, 1858 – February 2, 1919) was an American naval officer, engineer, and politician. Born into a highly respected naval family, Craven was raised in Maryland and New York City and in 1876 was appointed to the United States Naval Academy. While at the academy, he was a below-average student, finishing 55th out of a class of 72. He was, however, a member of the school's inaugural football team and later helped chronicle the academy's football program. He graduated from the academy in 1883 and was given a discharge the same year.

Following his naval service, Craven returned to New York and worked as an engineer on a number of transportation and sanitation projects. He was a long-time assistant of sanitation pioneer George E. Waring, Jr. Craven served for a brief period of time in the Brazilian navy during 1894, and returned to serve in the U.S. navy during the Spanish–American War. During the turn of the century, he rose through the ranks of New York City's sanitation department, eventually being appointed its commissioner in 1906. He served only for a few months; his predecessor had left the department in poor condition. Craven resigned in 1907 after a garbage collectors' strike. His health began to decline shortly afterwards and Craven died in 1919 at the age of 60.

== Family and Naval Academy ==
Craven was born on November 9, 1858, in Annapolis, Maryland.

== Naval service and assistant engineer ==
Craven was honorably discharged in 1883, but later served during the Spanish–American War and spent a short time in the Brazilian navy. He was for several years an assistant to George E. Waring, Jr., an engineer and sanitation expert.

== Politics and later life ==
During the early 1900s, Craven moved up through the ranks of the New York City Sanitation Department, eventually spending about six months as its commissioner, until a strike forced him to resign.

== Personal life ==
Craven was married and had four children. He was a noted Freemason.
