= 1948 Limerick Senior Hurling Championship =

Annual hurling competition season

- Champions: Ahane (15th title); Jackie Power (captain)
- Runners-up: Croom

The 1948 Limerick Senior Hurling Championship was the 54th staging of the Limerick Senior Hurling Championship since its establishment by the Limerick County Board.

Ahane were the defending champions.

On 28 November 1948, Ahane won the championship after a 2–03 to 0–01 defeat of Croom in the final. It was their 15th championship title overall and their seventh title in succession. It was the second time in their history that Ahane won seven titles in-a-row.

== Results ==
=== Final ===
28 November 1948 Final	Ahane	2–03 – 0–01	Croom	Gaelic Grounds, Limerick

== Championship statistics ==
=== Miscellaneous ===
- Five minutes after the final was due to start, the two captains and the referee decided to postpone the game due to foggy conditions. Many spectators left, however, officials from the Limerick County Board intervened stating that the championship would have to be played within the calendar year and not in the springtime as the two captains suggested. The game was played with hundreds of departing spectators unaware of the change.
