= 1958 All-Ireland Minor Hurling Championship =

All-Ireland Minor Hurling Championship 1958
Championship Details
- Dates: 6 April 1958 – 7 September 1958

All Ireland Champions
- Winners: Limerick (2nd win)
- Captain: Paddy Cobbe

All Ireland Runners-up
- Runners-up: Galway

Provincial Champions
- Munster: Limerick
- Leinster: Kilkenny
- Ulster: Antrim
- Connacht: Galway

The 1958 All-Ireland Minor Hurling Championship was the 28th staging of the All-Ireland Minor Hurling Championship since its establishment by the Gaelic Athletic Association in 1928. The championship began on 6 April 1958 and ended on 7 September 1958.

Tipperary entered the championship as the defending champions in search of a fourth successive title, however, they were beaten by Limerick in the Munster quarter-final.

On 7 September 1958 Limerick won the championship following a 5-8 to 3-10 defeat of Galway in the All-Ireland final. This was their second All-Ireland title and their first in 15 championship seasons.

== Results ==
=== Connacht Minor Hurling Championship ===
3 August 1958 Final	Roscommon	1-1 - 12-10	Galway	Dr. Hyde Park

=== Leinster Minor Hurling Championship ===
15 June 1958 Semi-final	Laois	3-9 - 4-3	Wexford	Nowlan Park

29 June 1958 Semi-final	Dublin	1-3 - 4-7	Kilkenny	Wexford Park

13 July 1958 Final	Kilkenny	5-11 - 1-7	Laois	Wexford Park

=== Munster Minor Hurling Championship ===
6 July 1958 Final	Limerick	8-9 - 2-5	Waterford	Thurles Sportsfield

=== Ulster Minor Hurling Championship ===
13 July 1958 Final	Donegal	2-1 - 9-9	Antrim	Carndonagh

13 July 1958 Final	Antrim	10-5 - 0-2	Down	Casement Park

=== All-Ireland Minor Hurling Championship ===
10 August 1958 Semi-final	Limerick	8-14 - 0-2	Antrim	Croke Park

17 August 1958 Semi-final	Galway	4-5 - 3-5	Kilkenny	Croke Park

7 September 1958 Final	Limerick	5-8 - 3-10	Galway	Croke Park
