= Paddy Cunneen =

Irish hurler

Personal information
- Native name: Pádraig Ó Coinín (Irish)
- Nickname: Farmer
- Born: 1936 Limerick, Ireland
- Died: 2023 (aged 86–87)
- Height: 5 ft 10 in (178 cm)

Sport
- Sport: Hurling
- Position: Goalkeeper
Club
- Years: Club
- St. Patrick's
Club titles
- Limerick titles: 0
Inter-county
- Years: County
- Limerick
Inter-county titles
- Munster titles: 1
- All-Irelands: 0
- NHL: 0

Patrick J. Cunneen (born 1936) is an Irish retired hurler who played at club level with St. Patrick's and at inter-county level with Limerick.

== Career ==
From the St. Patrick's club, Cunneen first came to prominence on the inter-county scene with the Limerick junior team that overcame London to win the 1955 All-Ireland Junior Championship. Promotion to the senior side followed, with Cunneen lining out in goal when Limerick surprised Clare to win the 1955 Munster Championship. The team, labelled "Mackey's Greyhounds" after their trainer Mick Mackey, were subsequently beaten by eventual champions Wexford in the All-Ireland semi-final.

== Honours ==
Limerick

- Munster Senior Hurling Championship: 1955
- All-Ireland Junior Hurling Championship: 1954
- Munster Junior Hurling Championship: 1954
