= John McDonough (piper) =

- Born: Annaghdown, County Galway
- Died: 1857; Annaghdown, County Galway
- Other name: Mac an Asal
- Occupation: Irish Piper
- Children: Bridget Kenny, Mary Anne, John McDonough

John McDonough (died 1857) was an Irish piper born in Annaghdown, County Galway. He was also known as "Mac an Asal" and spent a lot of his time in Dublin. He is mentioned in Francis O'Neill's Irish Minstrels and Musicians and described as "the best player of Irish pipes known in his day."

== Biography ==
John McDonough gained the nickname "Mac an Asal" ("son of a donkey") because his father, who sold donkeys, made him play the pipes while they travelled to the market while sitting on the backs of one of the animals. This helped McDonough develop his musical skills while also attracting attention to his father's business.

McDonough had at least three children: Bridget Kenny, Mary Anne, and John McDonough. Kenny went on to become a prolific fiddler and earned the title "The Queen of Irish Fiddlers."

Later in life, McDonough struggled through the Great Famine which forced him to leave Dublin, and then died in the Gort poorhouse where he was born, "neglected and ignored." His death was soon after Bridget Kenny was born.

== Career ==
McDonough's pipe was made by Micheal Egan who was considered "the most famous of all Irish pipemakers" while they were in Liverpool at the same time.

He was a "celebrated Irish piper" and was known for his expressive playing in a way that made the music his own. McDonough was very adaptable as a musician and preferred piece and descriptive music.

While in Dublin, McDonough was at Trinity College "either for the purpose of teaching his art" or just for entertainment. It's possible he met Canon Goodman, who was later a professor there, during his travels. Goodman is considered a "reverend piper" and was given instruction by McDonough for a time.

Also in Dublin, there was a night McDonough was playing on the streets in the evening and gathered a crowd. A "well-to-do gentry" approached him and took him to a nearby clubhouse to show his appreciation. McDonough reappeared on the streets later, visibly drunk, and this made the original audience so angry that they began to stone the building.
