= USS Macdonough (DDG-39) =

Guided missile destroyer in the United States Navy

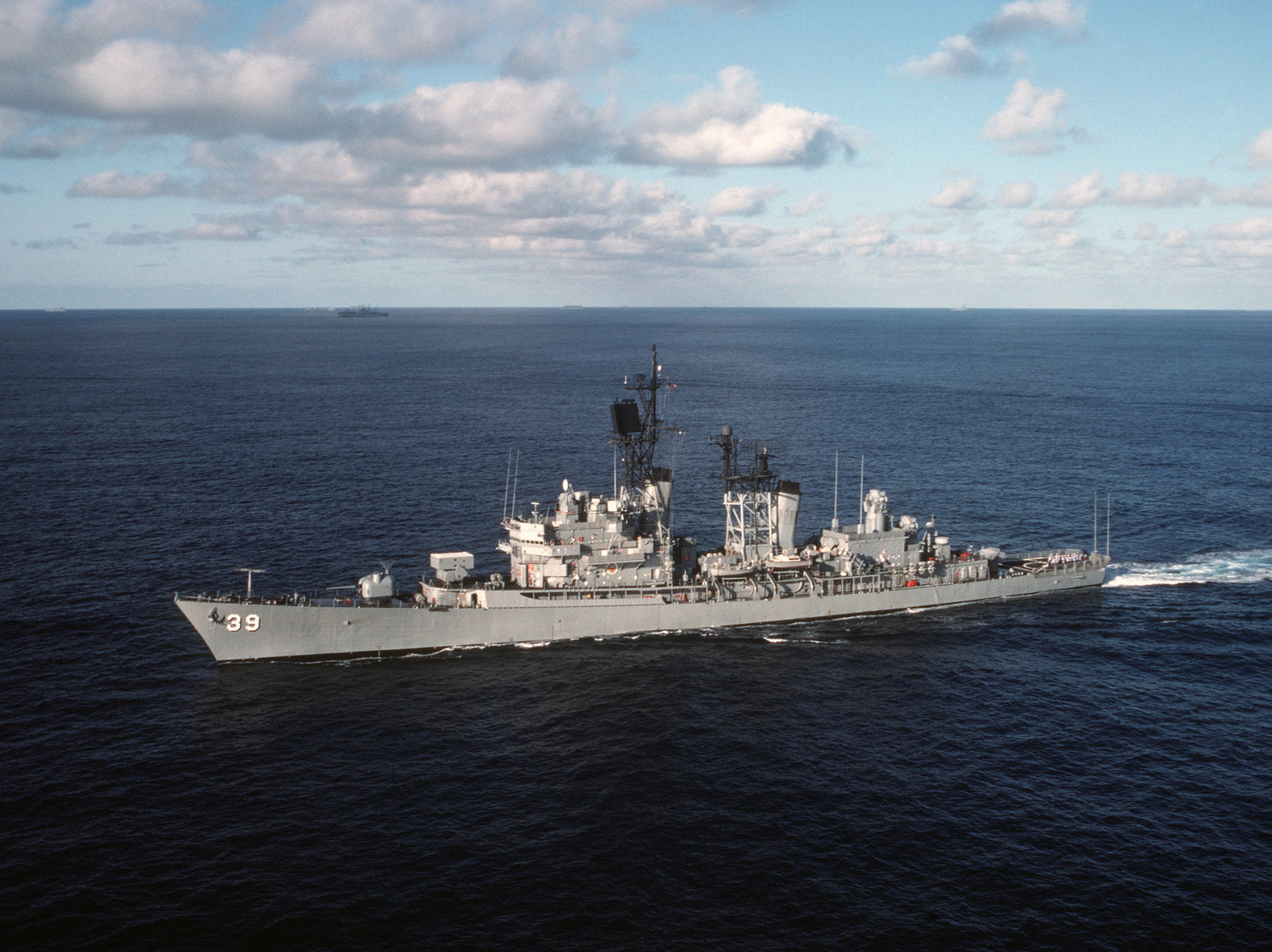
- USS Macdonough (DDG-39)USS MacDonough (DDG-39)

History

United States
- Name: MacDonough
- Namesake: Thomas MacDonough
- Builder: Fore River Shipyard, Bethlehem Steel Corporation
- Laid down: 15 April 1958
- Launched: 9 July 1959
- Commissioned: 4 November 1961
- Decommissioned: 23 October 1992
- Stricken: 30 November 1992
- Fate: Sold for scrapping
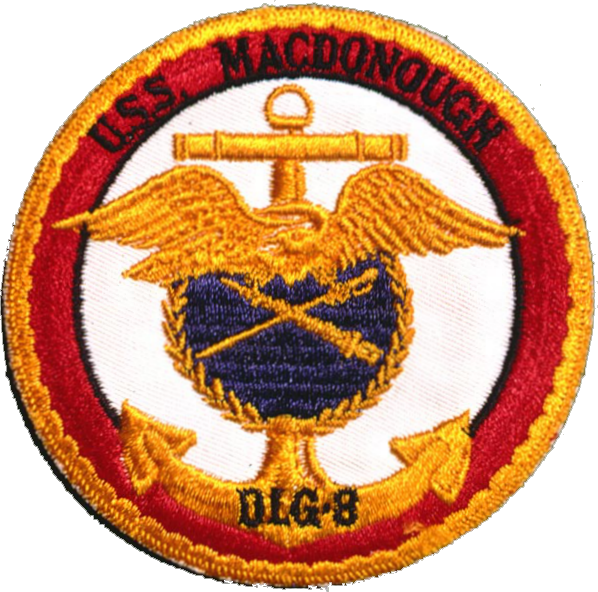
- Badge

General characteristics
- Class & type: Farragut-class destroyer
- Displacement: 5,800 tons
- Length: 512.5 ft (156.2 m)
- Beam: 52 ft (16 m)
- Draft: 25 ft (7.6 m)
- Propulsion: 4 x 1200psi boilers; 2 x geared turbines
- Speed: 33 knots (61 km/h; 38 mph)
- Complement: 377 (21 officers + 356 enlisted)
- Armament: 1 x 1 Mk 42 5-inch (127 mm)/54 dual-purpose gun; 1 x 2 Mk 10 Mod 0 missile launcher for Terrier SAM later SM1 Standard Missile; 1 x 8 Mk 16 ASROC Box missile launcher; 2 x 3 12.75-inch (324 mm) Mk 32 torpedo tubes for Mk 46 torpedoes; 2 x 4 Mk 141 Harpoon anti-ship missile launchers

USS Macdonough (DLG-8/DDG-39) was a Farragut-class guided missile destroyer in the United States Navy. She was named for Commodore Thomas Macdonough, the 4th ship of the United States Navy to be named for him.

== Construction and career ==
The fourth Macdonough was projected as DL-8, but redesignated DLG-8 prior to keel laying by the Fore River Shipyard owned by Bethlehem Steel Co. in Quincy, Massachusetts, on 16 April 1958. The ship was launched on 9 July 1959, sponsored by Mrs. Agnes Macdonough Wilson, great-granddaughter of Commodore Thomas Macdonough; and commissioned on 4 November 1961. She was initially rated as a guided missile frigate.

Having undergone an extended shakedown and training period, she reported to her home port at Charleston, South Carolina, 23 September 1962 and assumed duties as flagship for Commander, Cruiser-Destroyer Flotilla 6, U.S. Atlantic Fleet. A month later she joined other units of the U.S. 2nd Fleet in enforcing the Cuban quarantine during the Cuban Missile Crisis, become part of Task Group 136.1 under Rear Admiral John Ailes, Commander, CruDesFlot 6. She remained with that force until it was dissolved on Thanksgiving Day, 22 November. The first 3 months of 1963 were spent firing missiles off the coast of Florida under the auspices of the Operational Test and Evaluation Force. She returned to Charleston in March and operated in the Charleston-Norfolk area until departing on her first U.S. 6th Fleet deployment 4 June.

The guided missile destroyer cruised the Mediterranean Sea until the following fall, taking part in scheduled fleet exercises and training operations. Upon her return to the East Coast of the United States, 26 October, she resumed operations in the Charleston area. With the new year, 1964, Macdonough steamed south to Puerto Rico for training exercises with the 2nd Fleet. During these exercises; she participated in an Atlantic Fleet live-firing anti-air warfare exercise, which included missile firing at drone aircraft. The ship returned to Charleston for 2 weeks in February, and then put out to sea again for carrier exercises off the East Coast followed by helicopter evaluation tests in the Atlantic.

Macdonough's second Mediterranean deployment, 10 July to 22 December 1964, was followed by a 6-month overhaul at the Charleston Naval Shipyard. Coastal operations out of home port occupied the frigate until mid-September 1965, when she proceeded to the Atlantic Fleet Missile Range and then to Guantánamo Bay, Cuba, for training exercises. Having returned to her Charleston home port in early November, Macdonough prepared for another Mediterranean deployment, departing Charleston at the end of the month. Macdonough served as flagship for the recovery effort of the Palomares Incident during the third Mediterranean deployment.

On 8 April 1966, Macdonough returned to South Carolina and once again resumed operations and fleet and squadron exercises along the southern east coast and in the Caribbean Sea. During the summer a midshipman training cruise took the frigate to several east coast ports and to the Caribbean. After participating in "LANTFLEX 66," and AAW/ASW/amphibious exercise, she returned to Charleston on 16 December.

After conducting further exercises off the east coast, Macdonough prepared once again for overseas movement; and, on 2 May 1967, she departed Charleston for her fourth Mediterranean cruise. She conducted summer midshipmen training, visited various Mediterranean ports and participate in several joint exercises with ships of allied navies, returning to South Carolina 28 October.

Macdonough continued operating with the 2nd Fleet until May 1968 when she again deployed to the Mediterranean, returning to her home port in September. She remained off the east coast into 1969.

== Decommissioning ==
Commissioned as a guided missile frigate (DLG), the USS MacDONOUGH was reclassified as guided missile destroyer (DDG) on 30 June 1975, changing its hullnumber from DLG 8 to DDG 39.

The ship was decommissioned on 23 October 1992, and stricken from the Navy list on 20 November 1992. On 16 December 1994, the MacDONOUGH was finally sold for scrapping.
