= List of ship launches in 1816 =

The list of ship launches in 1816 includes a chronological list of some ships launched in 1816.

Date	Ship	Class	Builder	Location	Country	Notes
11 January	Congo	Paddle sloop	William Stone	Deptford Dockyard	United Kingdom	For Royal Navy.
15 January	Cameleon	Cherokee-class brig-sloop	Jamsetjee Bomanjee Wadia	Bombay	India	For Royal Navy.
16 January	Diamond	Leda-class frigate		Chatham Dockyard	United Kingdom	For Royal Navy.
10 February	Ariadne	Hermes-class post ship	Edward Churchill	Pembroke Dockyard	United Kingdom	For Royal Navy.
10 February	Valorous	Hermes-class post ship	Edward Churchill	Pembroke Dockyard	United Kingdom	For Royal Navy.
28 February	Louisa	Brig	James Adamson	Aberdeen	United Kingdom	For private owner.
11 March	Kazan	Corvette		Kazan	Russia	For Imperial Russian Navy.
14 March	Antigone	Armide-class frigate	François Courau	Bordeaux	France	For French Navy.
30 March	Black Prince	Black Prince-class ship of the line	Henry Canham	Woolwich Dockyard	United Kingdom	For Royal Navy.
10 April	Majestic	Steam yacht	Caught	Ramsgate	United Kingdom	For Thames Steam Yacht Company.
13 April	Buckinghamshire	East Indiaman		Bombay	India	For British East India Company.
13 April	Pallas	Apollo-class frigate	Nicholas Diddams	Portsmouth Dockyard	United Kingdom	For Royal Navy.
13 April	Pitt	Vengeur-class ship of the line	Nicholas Diddams	Portsmouth Dockyard	United Kingdom	For Royal Navy.
14 April	Amphitrite	Leda-class frigate		Bombay	India	For Royal Navy.
15 April	Minotaur	Ganges-class ship of the line	Robert Seppings & George Parkin	Chatham Dockyard	United Kingdom	For Royal Navy.
6 May	N. Rechdun Dubh	Merchantman	Skene	Leith	United Kingdom	For private owner.
16 May	Krasnoi	Anapa-class ship of the line	M. K. Surovtsov	Kherson	Russia	For Imperial Russian Navy.
18 May	Neva	Rossiia-class frigate	B. F. Stoke	Saint Peterburg	Russia	For Imperial Russian Navy.
26 May	Arsis	Selafail-class ship of the line	A. M. Kurochkin	Arkhangelsk	Russia	For Imperial Russian Navy.
26 May	Katsbakh	Selafail-class ship of the line	A. M. Kurochkin	Arkhangelsk	Russia	For Imperial Russian Navy.
26 May	Provornyi	Provornyi-class frigate	A. M. Kurochkin	Saint Petersburg	Russia	For Imperial Russian Navy.
5 June	Lord Suffield	Merchantman	Jacob Preston	Great Yarmouth	United Kingdom	For Jacob Preston.
13 June	Elizabeth Henrietta	Brig		Sydney Dockyard	(United Kingdom of Great Britain and Ireland) New South Wales	For Government of New South Wales.
16 June	Nikolai	Anapa-class ship of the line	D. V. Kuznetsov	Kherson	Russia	For Imperial Russian Navy.
June	Alert	Cutter	Wallis & Co	Blackwall	United Kingdom	For Mr. Minshan.
June	Erie	Schooner		Black Rock, Connecticut	United States	For United States Navy.
3 July	Patrikii	Speshnyi-class frigate	A. M. Kurochkin	Arkhangelsk	Russia	For Imperial Russian Navy.
July	Blenheim	Merchantman	Ann Burn	Sunderland	United Kingdom	For M. Laws.
8 August	Royal Sovereign	Yacht		Deptford Dockyard	United Kingdom	For unknown owner.
16 August	Legkii	Spechnyi-class frigate	B. F. Stoke	Saint Petersburg	Russia	For Imperial Russian Navy.
16 August	Pospeshnyi	Provornyi-class frigate	B. F. Stoke	Saint Petersburg	Russia	For Imperial Russian Navy.
20 August	Charles Philip	Steamboat		Petit-Bercy	France	For private owner.
8 September	Victory	Merchantman	James Macrae	Chittagong	India	For private owner.
21 September	Hero	Vengeur-class ship of the line	William Stone	Deptford Dockyard	United Kingdom	For Royal Navy.
September	Frontenac	Paddle steamer		Ernest-town	(United Kingdom of Great Britain and Ireland) Upper Canada	For private owner.
2 October	Leiptsig	Leiptsig-class ship of the line	G. S. Isakov	Saint Petersburg	Russia	For Imperial Russian Navy.
21 October	Cleopatra's Barge	Yacht	Retire Bucket	Salem, Massachusetts	United States	For George Crowdinshield Jr.
21 October	Waterloo	East Indiaman	Robert Wigram	Blackwall, London	United Kingdom	For British East India Company.
October	Audacieux	Téméraire-class ship of the line	Schuyt	Amsterdam	Netherlands	For French Navy.
October	Rhijn	Pallas-class frigate		Rotterdam	Netherlands	For Royal Netherlands Navy.
October	Sherbrooke	Horse-powered paddle-wheel vessel		Dartmouth	(United Kingdom of Great Britain and Ireland) Upper Canada	For private owner.
6 November	Lady Mary Pelham	Packet ship	John Pelham	Rotherhithe	United Kingdom	For Post Office Packet Service.
6 November	Marchioness Salisbury	Packet ship	John Pelham	Rotherhithe	United Kingdom	For Post Office Packet Service.
21 November	Lady Kennaway	Merchantman	Kyd & Co.	Kidderpore	India	For Kyd & Co.
December	Maria	Barque		Chepstow	United Kingdom	For private owner.
Unknown date	Amity	Brig		Saint John	(United Kingdom of Great Britain and Ireland) Colony of New Brunswick	For private owner.
Unknown date	Anna	Merchantman			India	For private owner.
Unknown date	Ann and Amelia	Full-rigged ship	James Macrae	Chittagong	India	For Joseph Somes.
Unknown date	Arvales	Brig		Sunderland	United Kingdom	For private owner.
Unknown date	Cadmus	Merchantman	Thatcher Magoun	Medford, Massachusetts	United States	For Benjamin Rich & Co.
Unknown date	Caledonia	Paddle steamer	J. & C. Wood	Glasgow	United Kingdom	For private owner.
Unknown date	Cerberus	Brig	John Laing & Co.	Sunderland	United Kingdom	For Mr. Blanchard.
Unknown date	Commodore Hayes	Full-rigged ship		Kidderpore	India	For Forbes & Co.
Unknown date	Constantia	Coaster		Swansea	United Kingdom	For W. Moyes & Co.
Unknown date	Cyprus	Brig		Sunderland	United Kingdom	For private owner.
Unknown date	David Clark	Barque	S. Teague	Calcutta	India	For Ferguson Bros.
Unknown date	De Voos	Full-rigged ship			Netherlands	For Royal Netherlands Navy.
Unknown date	Dorah	Merchantman		Chittagong	India	For F. J. I. Edwards & Co.
Unknown date	Eliza	Merchantman		Calcutta	India	For private owner.
Unknown date	Eliza	Brig	R. Radcliffe	Sunderland	United Kingdom	For private owner.
Unknown date	Elizabeth	Merchantman	J. Gilmore & Co	Calcutta	India	For private owner.
Unknown date	Fame	Merchantman	J. S. Scott	Calcutta	India	For private owner.
Unknown date	Frontenac	Steamship			(United Kingdom of Great Britain and Ireland) Upper Canada	For private owner.
Unknown date	Graces	Snow	John & Philip Laing	Sunderland	United Kingdom	For private owner.
Unknown date	Greyhound	Merchantman		Java	Netherlands East Indies	For private owner.
Unknown date	Hannah	Square		Sunderland	United Kingdom	For private owner.
Unknown date	Isabella	Brig	J. Hall	Sunderland	United Kingdom	For private owner.
Unknown date	Isabella	Brig	John M. & William Gales	Sunderland	United Kingdom	For John M. & William Gales.
Unknown date	Java	Fourth rate		Rotterdam	Netherlands	For Royal Netherlands Navy.
Unknown date	John Baker	Merchantman		Sunderland	United Kingdom	For private owner.
Unknown date	Kanonneerboot No. 7	Gunboat			Netherlands	For Royal Netherlands Navy.
Unknown date	Kanonneerboot No. 27	Gunboat			Netherlands	For Royal Netherlands Navy.
Unknown date	Lady Mary Pelham	Brig	John Pelham	Rotherhithe	United Kingdom	For James Hay.
Unknown date	Marsha & Ann	Brig	John M. & William Gales	Sunderland	United Kingdom	For Mark Thompson.
Unknown date	Ontario	Steamship		Sackets Harbor	United States	For private owner.
Unknown date	Paris	Merchantman		Sunderland	United Kingdom	For private owner.
Unknown date	Pascoa	Full-rigged ship	Matthew Smith	Howrah	India	For T. de Souza & Co.
Unknown date	Phatisalam	Merchantman		Cochin	India	For private owner.
Unknown date	Planet	Lightship		Bombay	India	For Bombay Pilot Service.
Unknown date	Prince Leopold	Merchantman		Sunderland	United Kingdom	For Mr. Mitchell.
Unknown date	Riseborough	Merchantman	John & Philip Laing	Sunderland	United Kingdom	For Bailey & Co.
Unknown date	Royal Union	Merchantman		Sunderland	United Kingdom	For private owner.
Unknown date	Rothsay Castle	Paddle steamer			United Kingdom	For private owner.
Unknown date	Sevastopol	Schooner	Tarusov	Sevastopol	Russia	For Imperial Russian Navy.
Unknown date	Sisters	Brig		Monkwearmouth	United Kingdom	For private owner.
Unknown date	Skene	Brig	Skene	Leith	United Kingdom	For L. Skeene.
Unknown date	Starling	Snow	John M. & William Gales	Sunderland	United Kingdom	For John M. & William Gales.
Unknown date	Superior	Schooner		Ashtabula, Ohio	United States	For private owner.
Unknown date	Supply	Water boat		Bombay	India	For Royal Navy.
Unknown date	Three Sisters	Merchantman	John & Philip Laing	Sunderland	United Kingdom	For R. Smith.
Unknown date	Union	Snow	John M. & William Gales	Sunderland	United Kingdom	For Jonathan & Will Canney.
Unknown date	Wanderer	Merchantman	W. Potts	Sunderland	United Kingdom	For private owner.
Unknown date	William Miles	West Indiaman	George Hilhouse & Sons	Bristol	United Kingdom	For Miles & Co.
Unknown date	Zephyr	Snow	E. Potts	Sunderland	United Kingdom	For Rowland Webster.
