= List of shipwrecks in August 1883 =

The list of shipwrecks in August 1883 includes ships sunk, foundered, grounded, or otherwise lost during August 1883.

== 2 August ==
List of shipwrecks: 2 August 1883
| Ship | State | Description |
|---|---|---|
| Carnatic | United Kingdom | The clipper foundered off the Cape of Good Hope, Cape Colony. All nineteen people on board were rescued on 4 August by the full-rigged ship Alumbagh (United Kingdom). Carnatic was on a voyage from Taifanfoo, Formosa to New York, United States. |

== 5 August ==
List of shipwrecks: 5 August 1883
| Ship | State | Description |
|---|---|---|
| Queen Mab | Russia | The yacht struck the wreck of Flamingo (United Kingdom) and sank off St. Margaret's Bay, Kent, United Kingdom. Her crew survived. |

== 6 August ==
List of shipwrecks: 6 August 1883
| Ship | State | Description |
|---|---|---|
| Jane | United Kingdom | The smack was driven ashore at Keiss, Caithness. |

== 7 August ==
List of shipwrecks: 7 August 1883
| Ship | State | Description |
|---|---|---|
| A. C. Meyer | Germany | The ship departed from Quebec City, Canada for Cardiff, Glamorgan, United Kingdom. No further trace, reported overdue. |

== 8 August ==
List of shipwrecks: 8 August 1883
| Ship | State | Description |
|---|---|---|
| Speranza | Norway | The barque collided with the barque Erstatningen (Norway) and sank in the English Channel 10 nautical miles (19 km) off Dover, Kent, United Kingdom. Her crew were rescued by Speranza. |
| William Miles | United Kingdom | The barque ran aground and sank near Porthcawl, Glamorgan. The lifeboat Chafyn Grove ( Royal National Lifeboat Institution) rescued all thirteen people on board. William Miles was on a voyage from Havre de Grâce, Seine-Inférieure, France to Swansea, Glamorgan. |

== 9 August ==
List of shipwrecks: 9 August 1883
| Ship | State | Description |
|---|---|---|
| Givalia | United Kingdom | The steamship was driven ashore at Port Glasgow, Renfrewshire. |
| J. E. Furlong | United Kingdom | The schooner was abandoned off Ballycastle, County Antrim. Her four crew were rescued. |
| Joseph Thompson | United Kingdom | The ship departed from Coosaw Island, South Carolina, United States for Bo'ness, Lothian. No further trace, reported overdue. |

== 10 August ==
List of shipwrecks: 10 August 1883
| Ship | State | Description |
|---|---|---|
| Evie Reed | United States | The barque was driven ashore in the "Pamalang Islands". She was on a voyage from Samarang, Netherlands East Indies to Manila, Spanish East Indies. She was refloated on 23 August and taken in to Surabaya, Netherlands East Indies. |
| Louisa | United Kingdom | The Thames barge sprang a leak and sank in the River Thames at Erith, Kent. Her crew were rescued by another Thames barge. |
| Sarah Lavina | United States | The schooner was sunk in a collision with the steamship Willam Lawrence (United States) near Point Lookout with the loss of four lives. |

== 11 August ==
List of shipwrecks: 11 August 1883
| Ship | State | Description |
|---|---|---|
| Hillechina | Netherlands | The schooner sprang a leak and foundered in the North Sea (56°10′N 6°55′E). Her six crew were rescued by the steamship Granville (United Kingdom). Hillechina was on a voyage from Delfzijl, Groningen to Sundsvall, Sweden. |

== 12 August ==
List of shipwrecks: 12 August 1883
| Ship | State | Description |
|---|---|---|
| Norden, and Palmer | Norway | The barque Norden collided with the brig Norden. Both vessels were severely damaged. |
| Provenzel | Spain | The steamship was lost near Santona. Her crew were rescued. |

== 13 August ==
List of shipwrecks: 13 August 1883
| Ship | State | Description |
|---|---|---|
| Evelyn | United Kingdom | The steamship was run into by the steamship Ghazee (United Kingdom) and sank off Cape St. Vincent, Portugal. Evelyn was on a voyage from Cardiff, Glamorgan to Salerno, Sicily, Italy. |
| Merthyr | United Kingdom | The steamship ran aground at Portugalete, Spain. She was run into by the steamship Rumney (United Kingdom) and was holed. |
| Nereid | United Kingdom | The barque collided with HMS Eclipse (Royal Navy) and sank in the Mediterranean Sea 40 nautical miles (74 km) south of Cape Palos, Spain (37°14′N 0°12′W). Her ten crew were rescued by HMS Eclipse. Nereid was on a voyage from North Shields, Northumberland to Tarragona, Spain. |

== 14 August ==
List of shipwrecks: 14 August 1883
| Ship | State | Description |
|---|---|---|
| Luso | Portugal | The steamship was wrecked at "Giuberon". Her crew were rescued. |

== 15 August ==
List of shipwrecks: 15 August 1883
| Ship | State | Description |
|---|---|---|
| William Hartmann | Netherlands | The steamship was driven ashore and wrecked at the Hoek van Holland, South Holland. She was on a voyage from Huelva, Spain to Rotterdam, South Holland. |
| Theodore Catharina | Germany | The ship departed from Savannah, Georgia, United States for London, United Kingdom. No further trace, reported overdue. |
| Maassluis Lifeboat | United Kingdom | The lifeboat capsized whilst going to the assistance of William Hartmann (Netherlands) with the loss of five lives. |

== 16 August ==
List of shipwrecks: 16 August 1883
| Ship | State | Description |
|---|---|---|
| Airy | United Kingdom | The steamship was driven ashore and wrecked on the Arabian coast at "Neshto". Her crew were rescued. She was on a voyage from Bombay, India to Port Said, Egypt. |
| Baron Mackay | Netherlands East Indies | The steamship struck a rock and was wrecked in the Karimata Strait. |
| Corinth | United Kingdom | The steamship ran aground on the Elba Reef, in the Red Sea. She was on a voyage from Bombay, India to Marseille, Bouches-du-Rhône, France. She was refloated on 19 August and subsequently taken in to Suez, Egypt. |

== 17 August ==
List of shipwrecks: 17 August 1883
| Ship | State | Description |
|---|---|---|
| Ariel | United Kingdom | The steamship put in to Tunis, Tunisia on fire. She was on a voyage from Agrigento, Sicily, Italy to London. |
| Eider | United Kingdom | The steamship was driven ashore in the Oude Vlie. She was on a voyage from London to Harlingen, Friesland, Netherlands. She was refloated on 30 August. |
| Zenobia | Norway | The barque was driven ashore at "Krawing", Netherlands East Indies. She was on a voyage from Pakalongan, Netherlands East Indies to Lisbon, Portugal. |

== 19 August ==
List of shipwrecks: 19 August 1883
| Ship | State | Description |
|---|---|---|
| Waterloo | Netherlands | The ship departed from Pensacola, Florida, United States for Amsterdam, North Holland. No further trace, reported missing. |

== 20 August ==
List of shipwrecks: 20 August 1883
| Ship | State | Description |
|---|---|---|
| C. T. B. | United Kingdom | The ship departed from Lisbon, Portugal for Amlwch, Anglesey. No further trace,. reported missing. |

== 22 August ==
List of shipwrecks: 22 August 1883
| Ship | State | Description |
|---|---|---|
| Unnamed | Russia | The lighter was run into by the steamship Gordonia (United Kingdom) and sank at Riga. |

== 23 August ==
List of shipwrecks: 23 August 1883
| Ship | State | Description |
|---|---|---|
| Cyane | United States | The whaler, a barque ran aground in the Chukchi Sea 5 nautical miles (9.3 km) north east of Point Belcher (70°47′40″N 159°39′02″W), Department of Alaska, during a gale. Her seventeen crew abandoned ship and survived, but she broke up. |
| Emma Kline | United States | The steamship was sunk in a collision with the steamship Dauntless (United States) with the loss of one life. |
| Fratelli Arecco | Italy | The ship was wrecked at Durban, Natal Colony. Her crew were rescued. She was on a voyage from Akyab, Buram to the English Channel. |
| Margaret | France | The schooner foundered in the Atlantic Ocean 10 nautical miles (19 km) south west of Looe, Cornwall, United Kingdom. Her crew survived. She was on a voyage from Cardiff, Glamorgan, United Kingdom to Brest, Finistère. |
| Merriano | United Kingdom | The steamship was driven ashore at Kastrup, Denmark. She was on a voyage from Grangemouth, Stirlingshire to Ystad, Sweden. |
| Oregon | Chile | The barque foundered on Oeno Island, one of the Pitcairn Islands. |

== 24 August ==
List of shipwrecks: 24 August 1883
| Ship | State | Description |
|---|---|---|
| Thames | United Kingdom | The steam lighter was run into by the steamship Egypt (United Kingdom) and sank in the River Thames at Woolwich, Kent. Thames was subsequently refloated and taken in to Sheerness, Kent for repairs. |

== 25 August ==
List of shipwrecks: 25 August 1883
| Ship | State | Description |
|---|---|---|
| HMS Jumna | Royal Navy | The troopship collided with HMS Minotaur (Royal Navy) and ran aground at Plymouth, Devon. |
| Kismet | United Kingdom | The barque caught fire and was abandoned off the coast of Santa Catarina, Brazil. Her crew were rescued by the steamship Menes (Germany). Kismet was on a voyage from Liverpool, Lancashire to Callao, Peru. |
| Marinella | United Kingdom | The yacht was driven ashore near "Scalpa". She was refloated on 28 August and beached at Kyleakin, Isle of Skye. |
| Palermo, and Rivoli | Germany; United Kingdom | The steamship Rivoli was run into by the steamship Palermo and sank off Ouessant, Finistère, France with the loss of five of her crew. Survivors were rescued by Palermo. Rivoli was on a voyage from Bilbao, Spain to Middlesbrough, Yorkshire. Palermo was severely damaged. She put in to Falmouth, Cornwall the next day waterlogged at the bow. |
| Teutonia | United Kingdom | The steamship was driven ashore at Cape Mazagan, Morocco. She was on a voyage from Glasgow, Renfrewshire to Buenos Aires, Argentina. She was refloated and taken in to Gibraltar in a leaky condition. |
| Werneth Hall | United Kingdom | The steamship ran aground in the Berlengas. She was on a voyage from Liverpool, Lancashire to Bombay, India. She was refloated and put in to Lisbon, Portugal in a leaky condition. |

== 26 August ==
List of shipwrecks: 26 August 1883
| Ship | State | Description |
|---|---|---|
| Elma | United Kingdom | The steamship was driven ashore at Stubben, Denmark. She was on a voyage from Kronstadt, Russia to London. She was refloated and put in to Copenhagen, Denmark. |
| Norbiton | United Kingdom | The steamship was run into by the steamship Acadia (United Kingdom) at Gibraltar and was severely damabed. |
| Pauline David | Belgium | The steamship ran aground during a dense fog, 15 nautical miles (28 km) north of Cape St Vincent, Portugal. Her 26 crew abandoned ship. They were rescued the next day by Gelert (United Kingdom). |
| Rowland | United Kingdom | The steamship ran aground in the Danube 35 nautical miles (65 km) from its mouth. She was refloated the next day and taken in to Galaţi, Romania. |
| Saint-Germain, and Woodburn | France; United Kingdom | Whilst under tow of the tug Recovery (United Kingdom), the steamship Woodburn was run into by the ocean liner Saint-Germain. Woodburn was cut in two and sank in the English Channel 45 nautical miles (83 km) south west of Plymouth, Devon with the loss of twenty of the 31 people on board. Survivors were rescued by St Germain. Woodburn had been on a voyage from Bombay to London, but had put in to Lisbon, Portugal due to a defect in her propeller shaft. She was being towed to London by Recovery. Saint-Germain was on a voyage from Havre de Grâce, Seine-Inférieure to New York, United States. She became waterlogged at the bow and was towed in to Plymouth by the tug Perseverance (United Kingdom). It was decided that temporary repairs would be made there before Saint-Germain returned to a French port for permanent repairs. |

== 27 August ==
List of shipwrecks: 27 August 1883
| Ship | State | Description |
|---|---|---|
| HNLMS Berouw | Royal Netherlands Navy | 1883 eruption of Krakatoa: The gunboat was anchored in the harbor at Telok Betong, Sumatra, Netherlands East Indies, when a tsunami generated by an eruption of Krakatoa washed her into the city's Chinese quarter at 7:30 a.m. A larger tsunami at 11:00 a.m. carried Berouw up the valley of the Koeripan River and dumped her 1.1 miles (1.8 km) inland at an elevation of 30 feet (9 m). Her entire crew of 28 died. |
| Dido | Germany | The barque was driven ashore 5 nautical miles (9.3 km) east of Baltimore, County Cork, United Kingdom. Her crew were rescued. She was on a voyage from Liverpool, Lancashire, United Kingdom to New York, United States. |
| Edith | United Kingdom | The steamship collided with the steamship Dordogne (United Kingdom) and sank off the coast of Finistère, France. Her crew were rescued. Edith was on a voyage from Swansea, Glamorgan to the Charente. |
| George Sutton | United Kingdom | The ship departed from Newcastle upon Tyne, Northumberland for Cork. No further trace, reported overdue. |
| John Marychurch | United Kingdom | The ship ran aground at "Reni", Romania. She was refloated on 29 August and taken in to Galaţi, Romania. |
| Prinses Wilhelmina | Netherlands | 1883 eruption of Krakatoa: The cargo-liner was stranded while in port at Tanjung Priok, Netherland East Indies by a tsunami of less than 6.6 feet (2 m) in height. She was refloated and returned to service. |
| Rydal | United Kingdom | The steamship was driven ashore at Cabo da Roca, Portugal. Her crew were rescued. She was on a voyage from Newport, Monmouthshire to Naples, Italy. |
| Unnamed | Flag unknown | 1883 eruption of Krakatoa: A large ship was left on the top of some trees 4 nautical miles (7.4 km) inland. |

== 28 August ==
List of shipwrecks: 28 August 1883
| Ship | State | Description |
|---|---|---|
| Fifeshire | United Kingdom | The steamship foundered in the Atlantic Ocean 4 nautical miles (7.4 km) north of Cabo da Roca, Portugal. Her 24 crew were rescued by the steamship Olympia (United Kingdom). Fifeshire was on a voyage from Cardiff, Glamorgan to Malta. |
| Rapid | United Kingdom | The steamship was wrecked near Brest, Finistère, France. Her crew were rescued. She was on a voyage from Bilbao, Spain to Cardiff. |
| Tempest | United Kingdom | The schooner was driven ashore at Wexford. She was on a voyage from Waterford to Wexford. She was refloated the next day and taken in to Wexford. |
| Theodore | United Kingdom | The ketch was driven onto the Longnose Rocks, Margate, Kent. She was refloated the next day. |
| Troubador | United Kingdom | The steamship departed from Gibraltar for Plymouth, Devon. No further trace, presumed foundered in the Bay of Biscay with the loss of all 27 crew. |
| Unnamed vessel | Flag unknown | An excursion steamship suffered a boiler explosion on the Hudson River and sank. The loss of life is unknown, although most of the several hundred on board were saved. |

== 29 August ==
List of shipwrecks: 29 August 1883
| Ship | State | Description |
|---|---|---|
| Anna | Germany | The schooner was wrecked west of Domesnes, Russia. Her crew were rescued. She was on a voyage from Riga, Russia to an English port. |
| Brenda | United Kingdom | The brig was wrecked at Nagasaki, Japan. |
| Cherubini | United Kingdom | The steamship departed from Sunderland, County Durham for Genoa, Kingdom of Italy. No further trace, presumed foundered with the loss of all 23 crew. |
| City of Glasgow | United Kingdom | The steamship departed from Glasgow, Renfrewshire for Porto, Portugal. No further trace, reported overdue. |
| C. S. P. | United Kingdom | The pilot boat sank in Swansea Bay. |
| James Bliss | United States | The fishing schooner sank in a gale on the Grand Banks of Newfoundland with the loss of all eleven or twelve crew. |
| Marguerite | France | The fishing trawler caught fire and was abandoned in the English Channel. Her nine crew survived. She came ashore at East Blatchington, Sussex, United Kingdom and was burnt out. |

== 30 August ==
List of shipwrecks: 30 August 1883
| Ship | State | Description |
|---|---|---|
| Zelini | United Kingdom | The steamship departed from Cardiff, Glamorgan for Porto, Portugal. No further trace, presumed foundered with the loss of all hands. A lifeboat sighted in the Bay of Biscay may have been from Zelini. |

== 31 August ==
List of shipwrecks: 31 August 1883
| Ship | State | Description |
|---|---|---|
| Aristos | United Kingdom | The brigantine was driven ashore on Flores Island, Azores. All on board were rescued. She was on a voyage from Faial Island, Azores to Boston. |
| Louise | United Kingdom | The steamship collided with the steamship Senior (Netherlands) and sank off the Île du Nord, Gironde. |

== Unknown date ==
List of shipwrecks: Unknown date in August 1883
| Ship | State | Description |
|---|---|---|
| Alaska | United States | The schooner departed Canso, Nova Scotia, Canada on 24 August and was not heard from again. She probably was lost with all 12 crew in the gale of 29 August. |
| Cambodia | United Kingdom | The steamship caught fire at Aden, Aden Settlement. |
| Challenge | United States | The schooner was lost on Long Beach, Cape Race, Newfoundland Colony. Her crew were saved. |
| City of Durham | United Kingdom | The steamship was wrecked on the Saintes, off the coast of Finistère, France. Her crew were rescued. She was on a voyage from Bilbao, Spain to Cardiff, Glamorgan. |
| Consclation | Flag unknown | The steamship was totally wrecked on the Rashafoon rock in the Red Sea. Her passengers and crew were rescued by the steamship Natal (France). |
| Der Versuch | Flag unknown | The ship was abandoned in the Atlantic Ocean. Her crew were rescued. She was on a voyage from Cardiff, Glamorgan, United Kingdom to Quebec City, Canada. |
| Earl of Dumfries | United Kingdom | The steamship was driven ashore at Lisbon, Portugal before 5 August. She was refloated in late August and towed in to Lisbon. |
| Evelyn | United Kingdom | The steamship collided with another vessel and sank off Cape St Vincent, Portugal with the loss of a crew member. |
| George Sutton | United Kingdom | The ship departed from Newcastle upon Tyne, Northumberland for Cork. No further trace, presumed foundered with the loss of all hands. |
| Karl William | Flag unknown | The ship foundered before 11 August. Her crew were rescued. She was on a voyage from Niuzhuang to Amoy, China. |
| Lottie | United Kingdom | The steamship was driven ashore at "Balcal", Portugal on or before 22 August. Her crew were rescued. She subsequently became a wreck. |
| Maria Auger | France | The barque was destroyed by fire at sea. Her crew were rescued. |
| Mayflower | United Kingdom | The schooner caught fire at Newquay, Cornwall and was scuttled. She was on a voyage from Swansea, Glamorgan to Plymouth, Devon. |
| Nor | Norway | The brigantine was driven ashore at Korsør, Denmark. She was on a voyage from Leith, Lothian, United Kingdom to Korsør. She was refloated and taken in to Korsør. |
| Octavia | (Dominion of Newfoundland) Newfoundland Colony | The ship was wrecked at Ferryland. Her crew were rescued. She was on a voyage from Saint John's to Sydney, Nova Scotia. |
| Pauline David | Belgium | The steamship struck a rock and foundered. |
| Perseveranceken | Belgium | The boat suffered an onboard explosion and sank at Wesel, Germany with the loss of all but her captain. |
| Prince Arthur | United Kingdom | The barque was driven ashore and wrecked in the Fiji Islands before 10 August. |
| Rapid | United Kingdom | The brig was driven ashore on Seal Island, Nova Scotia. She was on a voyage from Saint John, New Brunswick to Portrush, County Antrim. |
| Royal Crown | United Kingdom | The steamship ran aground near Baltimore, Maryland, United States. She was on a voyage from Baltimore to a French port. |
| Serena | United Kingdom | The barque was abandoned at sea with the loss of four of her crew. She was on a voyage from Swansea, Glamorgan to Valparaíso, Chile. |
| Washington | United States | The ship was driven ashore at "Romer". She was on a voyage from London, United Kingdom to New York. |
| Wealthy Pendleton | United States | The ship foundered in the South Atlantic. Her crew survived. She was on a voyage from "Malton Island" to Hamburg, Germany. |
| Two unnamed vessels | United Kingdom | The steamships ran aground on the Portuguese coast over a fortnight, due to thick fogs. One came ashore north of Cape St. Vincent before 5 August. The other came ashore south of Ericeira. |
