= William Miles (ship) =

Several vessels have borne the name William Miles.

- William Miles (1808 ship) was launched at Bristol in 1808 as a West Indiaman. In 1817 a new owner started sailing her to India, sailing under a licence from the East India Company (EIC). In 1828 she made a voyage transporting convicts to Van Diemen's Land. Thereafter she traded with Sierra Leone, Louisiana, and possibly other ports as well. She was broken up in 1846.
- William Miles (1816 ship) was launched at Bristol in 1816 as a West Indiaman. She remained a West Indiaman until 1846, though she did make some voyages to the Baltic. New owners from 1846 sailed her to Quebec and North America. She underwent lengthening in 1854. Thereafter, a sequence of owners sailed her India and the Mediterranean. She was wrecked on 9 August 1883 in the Bristol Channel.
- William Miles (1853 ship) was launched at Quebec in 1853. In the 1850s and 1860s she carried immigrants to Australia and New Zealand. She was wrecked on 20 May 1868 at Pensacola.
