= HMS Valorous =

HMS Valorous has been the name of four ships of the Royal Navy:

- HMS Valorous (1804) was a Combatant-class sixth-rate sloop. She was launched at Hull in 1804, became an army depot ship in 1810, and was sold in 1817.
- HMS Valorous (1816) was a Hermes-class sixth-rate sloop, launched at Pembroke Dockyard in Wales in 1816. She was broken up at Chatham in 1829.
- HMS Valorous (1851) was a 16-gun Magicienne-class paddle-frigate. She was launched at Pembroke Dockyard in 1851 and broken up in 1891. She was commanded in 1878 by Captain John A. Fisher (later Admiral of the Fleet Lord Fisher).
- HMS Valorous (L00) was an Admiralty V-class destroyer leader built by William Denny and Brothers and launched in 1917. She was sold for scrapping in 1947.
