= Governor Hastings =

Governor Hastings may refer to:

- Daniel H. Hastings (1849–1903), 21st Governor of Pennsylvania
- Hans Francis Hastings, 12th Earl of Huntingdon (1779–1828), Governor of Dominica from 1822 to 1824
- Warren Hastings (1732–1818), de facto Governor-General of India from 1774 to 1785
