= HMS Hermes (1811) =

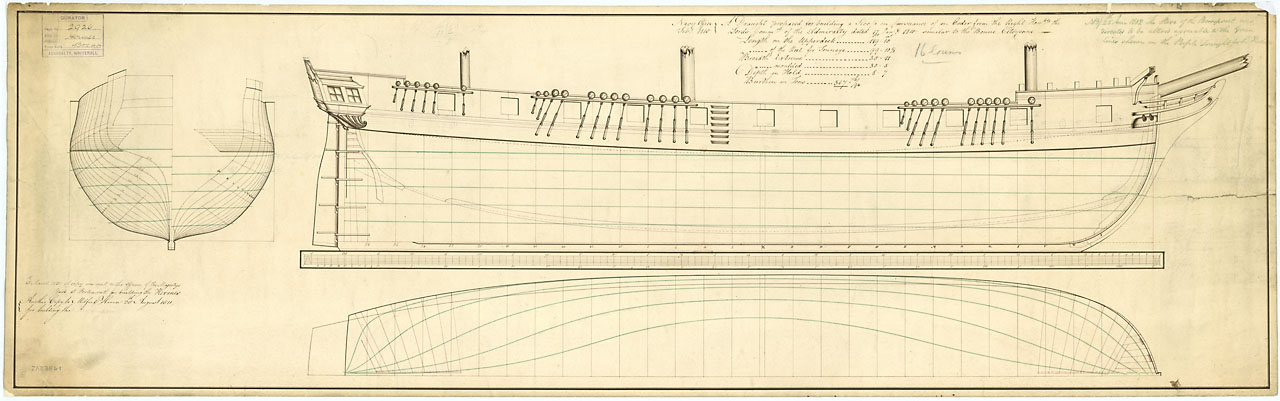
- Hermes

History

United Kingdom
- Name: HMS Hermes
- Ordered: 18 January 1810
- Builder: Milford Dockyard
- Laid down: May 1810
- Launched: 22 July 1811
- Completed: 7 September 1811
- Fate: Grounded in combat and burnt on 15 September 1814

General characteristics
- Class & type: 20-gun Hermes-class sixth-rate post ship
- Tons burthen: 5127/94 (bm)
- Length: 120 ft 1 in (36.6 m) (overall); 100 ft 2 1/8 in (30.5 m) (keel)
- Beam: 31 ft 0 in (9.4 m)
- Depth of hold: 8 ft 7 in (2.62 m)
- Sail plan: Full-rigged ship
- Complement: 135
- Armament: 2 × 9-pounder guns + 18 × 32-pounder carronades

HMS Hermes was a 20-gun Hermes-class sixth-rate flush-decked sloop-of-war built in Milford Dockyard to the lines of the ex-French Bonne Citoyenne. She was destroyed in 1814 to prevent her falling into American hands after grounding during her unsuccessful attack on Fort Bowyer on Mobile Point outside Mobile, Alabama.

== Napoleonic Wars ==
Captain Philip Browne (or Brauer) commissioned Hermes in July 1811. Under Browne, Hermes first captured an American vessel laden with stores for the Brest fleet and then two vessels from New York and Baltimore. On 24 September 1811, while near Cape La Hève (Le Havre), Hermes recaptured the Prussian brig Anna Maria which had been bound for London from Lisbon. A privateer managed to escape because of the nearness of the French coast.

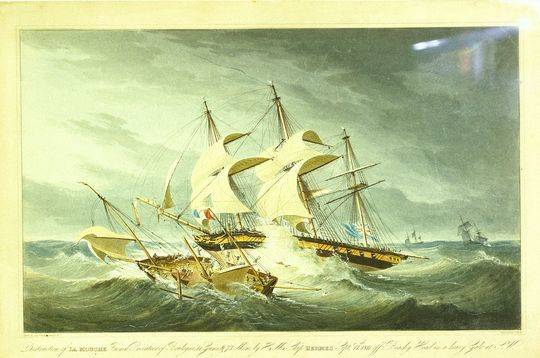
HMS Hermes crushing Mouche, by Capt. Phillip Brown

As the day continued, strong winds drove Hermes off station when near Beachy Head Browne discovered a large French lugger operating as a privateer in the midst of a number of English vessels. The privateer had already taken one prize and might have taken others had Hermes not arrived. After a chase of two hours, in which the lugger sustained some damage and had several men wounded, the privateer struck to Hermes. As Hermes slowed, the strong wind broke her maintop-sail-yard in the slings and her fore-sail split. The privateer immediately tried to escape on the opposite tack. Hermes managed to turn and by cramming on all sail caught up with the privateer although she had gotten a two-mile lead. Browne decided to run alongside, despite the gale to prevent the French vessel from escaping again. Unfortunately, as the lugger crossed Hermes's hawse a heavy sea caused Hermes to run over the lugger, sinking her. Hermes was unable to launch any boats and so was only able to save 12 out of the lugger's 51 men. (Another 10 men had been aboard the lugger's prize, which had escaped to France during the chase, taking with her the prize's crew.) The lugger turned out to be Mouche of Boulogne, under the command of M. Gageux. She had carried fourteen 12-pounder and 6-pounder guns.

== War of 1812 ==
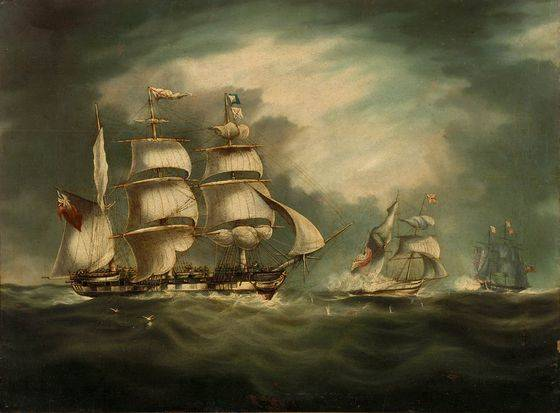
Left to right: HMS Belle Poule, the Gipsy, and HMS Hermes, by Thomas Buttersworth

On 11 February 1812 Hermes captured the American brig Flora. Then on 26 April Hermes captured the American brig Tigress.

Four days later, Hermes and Belle Poule captured the American letter of marque schooner Gipsy (or Gipsey). She was on her way from New York City to Bordeaux with a cargo worth £50,000 when the British vessels captured her in the mid-Atlantic after a three-day chase. Gipsey surrendered twice to Hermes and twice got away again before Belle Poule caught her. Gipsey was of 300 tons (bm) and was armed with twelve 18-pounder carronades and an 18-pounder gun on a pivot mount.

In late autumn 1812, Hermes was sailing off the Azores in the company of the 74-gun third rate Elephant, under the command of Francis Austen, the brother of the acclaimed novelist Jane Austen, together with the 36-gun fifth-rate frigate Phoebe. On 27 December Elephant and Hermes captured the American privateer schooner Sword Fish of Gloucester, John Evans, Master, and her crew of 82 men. During the 11-hour chase, which covered more than 100 miles, Sword Fish had thrown overboard ten of her sixteen 6-pounder guns. Sword Fish was 16 days out of Boston but had not captured anything. (Note: Swordfish, of 156 tons (bm), had first been commissioned on 8 August 1812 and on her first cruise had captured one prize. She was commissioned again on 12 November and it was on this, her second cruise, that she was captured.)

In April 1814, Captain the Hon. William Percy took command of Hermes. Edward Nicolls and his detachment, embarked aboard HMS Carron and Hermes, departed Bermuda, stopped at Havana and arrived at the mouth of the Apalachicola River eight days later on 13 August 1814. The Governor of West Florida requested the redeployment of British forces to Pensacola. (Note: Captain Percy to Admiral Cochrane: 'I assented to re-embark the marines and proceed to that place; acquainting him [Nicolls] at the same time with my firm determination, in the event of not receiving a request from the Governor to land them, immediately to return to the anchorage off the Apalachicola, as I had promised the Captain-General, at the Havannah, not to land on Spanish territory without being requested to do so.' 'On the 21st August I left Apalachicola, and arrived at this anchorage on the 23rd; having fallen in with, off the bar, and brought with me sloop Sophie. I fortunately found that a letter from the governor had been sent to me, requiring the naval force might be brought down, as he was threatened with an attack by the Americans: on the next morning I waited on the governor, when he requested me to disembark the detachment, ammunition, &c. which I immediately complied with. The fort San Miguel, the only one near the town, was put into the hands of Lieutenant-Colonel Nicolls; and the British colours were hoisted in conjunction with the Spanish, which he informed me was done with the governor's approbation.')

== Fate ==
In September 1814, Percy led her in an unsuccessful attack on Fort Bowyer. The Louisiana State Museum has a map of the battle.

The attack took place on 15 September at about 4:30pm. Two of the four British vessels could not get close enough to fire. The fort was more strongly armed than expected, the British fire was ineffective, and a parallel ground attack failed. Furthermore, as she tried to withdraw, Hermes grounded under the guns of the fort. Percy evacuated her crew on boats from Sophie and then set fire to Hermes, which blew up after the fire reached her magazine at around 10pm. In all, Hermes had lost 17 killed in action, five mortally wounded, and 19 wounded. (The medical journal of the Hermes has survived. )

On 18 January 1815, Percy faced a court martial on board Cydnus, off Cat Island on the coast of Mississippi. The court acquitted him of all blame, finding that the circumstances justified the attack and that all involved had behaved with great gallantry.
