= HMS Myrmidon (1813) =

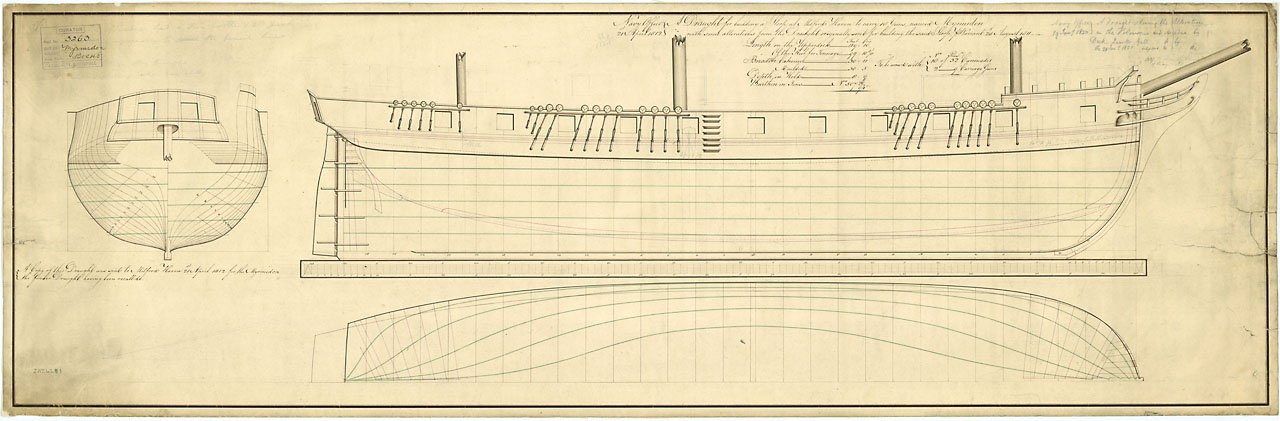
- Myrmidon

History

United Kingdom
- Name: Myrmidon
- Namesake: Myrmidons
- Ordered: 2 August 1811
- Builder: Milford Dockyard
- Laid down: July 1812
- Launched: 18 June 1813
- Completed: 6 February 1814
- Commissioned: August 1814
- Fate: Broken up by 10 January 1823

General characteristics
- Class & type: Hermes-class post ship
- Tons burthen: 509 25/94 bm
- Length: 119 ft 11 in (36.6 m) (gundeck); 99 ft 10 in (30.4 m) (keel)
- Beam: 31 ft (9.4 m)
- Draught: 10 ft 3 in (3.1 m)
- Depth: 8 ft 8 in (2.6 m)
- Sail plan: Full-rigged ship
- Complement: 135
- Armament: 18 × 32-pounder carronades; 2 × 9-pounder cannon

HMS Myrmidon was a 20-gun Hermes-class sixth-rate post ship built for the Royal Navy during the 1810s. She was commissioned in 1813 and was in the Mediterranean four years later. The ship was on the Africa Station in 1819 and was paid off three years later. Myrmidon was broken up in 1823.

== Description and construction ==
Myrmidon had a length at the gundeck of 119 feet 11 inches (36.6 m) and 99 feet 10 inches (30.4 m) at the keel. She had a beam of 31 feet (9.4 m), a draught of 10 feet 3 inches (3.1 m) and a depth of hold of 8 feet 8 inches (2.6 m). The ship's tonnage was 509 25/94 tons burthen. Myrmidon was armed with eighteen 32-pounder carronades and a pair of 9-pounder cannon as chase guns. The ship had a crew of 135 officers and ratings.

Myrmidon, the second ship of her name to serve in the Royal Navy, was ordered on 2 August 1811, laid down in July 1812 in Milford Dockyard, Wales, and launched on 18 June 1813. She was completed at Plymouth Dockyard on 6 February 1814.

== Service ==
The ship's first commission began in August 1813 under the command of Captain Valentine Gardner while she was still fitting out. He was relieved by Captain Henry Bourchier in October and then Captain William Patterson in 1814. Captain Robert Gambier assumed command on 25 April 1815; Myrmidon was paid off in October, but she was recommissioned with Gambier still in command. The ship was reclassified in February 1817 as a 20-gun sloop and was in the Mediterranean that year before paying off on 19 November 1818. She was recommissioned on 26 March 1818, under the command of Commander Henry John Leeke, for service on the Africa Station and was decommissioned at its end in October 1822. Myrmidon's demolition was completed on 10 January 1823 at Portsmouth Dockyard.
