= Thomas Noel Harris =

British Army officer

Sir Thomas Noel Harris
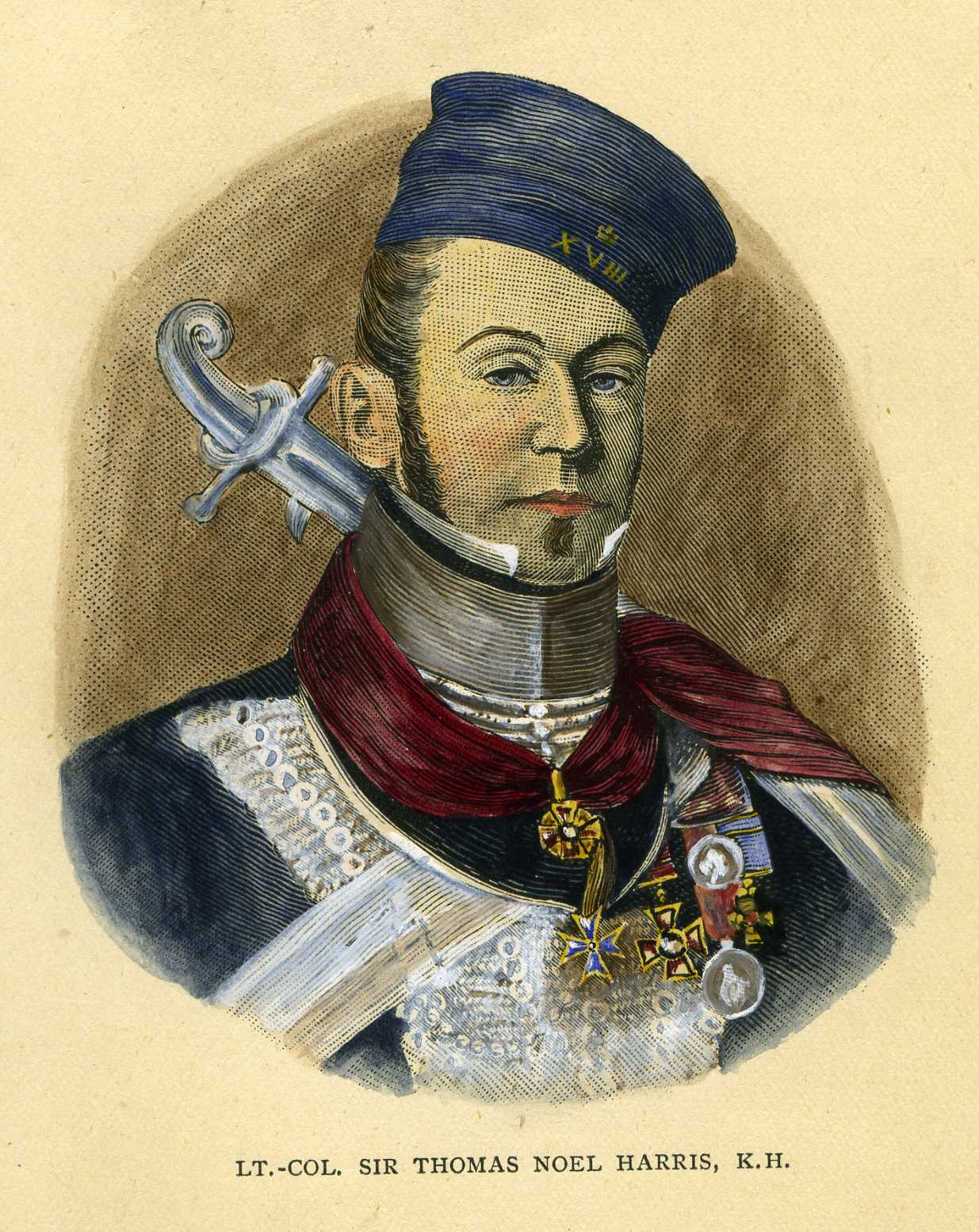
- Born: 9 October 1783; Whitwell, Rutland, England
- Died: 23 March 1860 (aged 76); Updown House, near Eastry, Kent
- Military career
- Allegiance: United Kingdom
- Branch: British Army
- Service years: 1801-1834
- Rank: Colonel
- Units: 87th Regiment of Foot; 52nd Regiment of Foot; 18th Hussars; 13th Light Dragoons
- Conflicts: Battle of Leipzig; Peninsular War; Quatre Bras; Waterloo
- Awards: KCH OMM (Prussia) KStA KStV

Colonel Sir Thomas Noel Harris KCH (9 October 1783 – 23 March 1860) was a British Army officer who fought during the Peninsular War and the Waterloo Campaign before finishing his career as Chief Magistrate of Gibraltar. He is notably the only British officers to be present at both Leipzig and Waterloo

== Early life ==
Harris was born in 1783 in Whitwell, Rutland, to rector Hamlyn Harris and Elizabeth Harris. Educated at Uppingham School, in 1801 he enlisted as an ensign in the 87th Regiment of Foot. He became a Lieutenant in the 52nd Regiment of Foot in 1802 and purchased a captaincy in the 18th Light Dragoons in 1807 before retiring through ill health having been refused a transfer to half-pay.

== Military career ==
In 1811 he joined the 13th Light Dragoons as a cornet, was promoted to a lieutenancy in the 18th Hussars and afterwards served in the Peninsular War from 1811 to 1813 as deputy assistant adjutant general attached to headquarters. From Spain he was sent to Germany where he served as aide-de-camp to Sir Charles Stewart (later Sir Charles Vane, 3rd Marquess of Londonderry).

He was present at the battles of Grossbergen, Dennewitz and Leipzig in October 1813. In his later narrative of the war Vane noted the gallantry displayed by Harris and his "efficient assistance". After the Battle of Leipzig he was presented with a fine sword by merchant and adventurer Edward Solly inscribed with the legend From Edward Solly To Thomas Noel Harris, In Commemoration Of Their Fellowship At The Memorable Battle Of Leipzig Of The 18th And 19th Of October 1813. In 2015, the sword was sold for £43,750 at a Bonham's auction.

From late 1813 until early 1814, Harris was attached to the staff of the Prussian General Blücher and at the end of his service received a gold ring and the feathers from Blücher's hat as a token of the latter's esteem.

On 30 March 1814, following the capitulation of Paris, Harris was sent to London by Stewart bearing dispatches with the news. He made the 400-mile (640 km) journey without rest while fending off attacks by supposedly friendly troops. He was taken to Carlton House to deliver dispatches to the Prince Regent.

In April 1815 he was appointed Brigade-Major to the 18th Hussars under Major-general Sir Hussey Vivian. On 15 June he attended the Duchess of Richmond's ball in Brussels. On receiving the order to join units, Harris left immediately in his red swallow-tailed court dress coat, which he subsequently wore at the battles of Quatre Bras and Waterloo.

He spent the eve of Waterloo with his cousin Lieutenant John Clement Wallington of the 10th Hussars. During the subsequent battle he had two horses shot from under him, but while charging in advance of one of the squadrons in his brigade his right arm was shattered by a musket ball. He was carried to the farmhouse of Hougoumont where his arm was amputated and was subsequently cared for by Wallington who took him to Brussels.

In October 1815 Harris returned to France and carried with him four swords voted by the Corporation of London for the commanders of the four allied armies.

Harris became a lieutenant-colonel in 1823 and was appointed Inspecting Field-Officer of Militia in Nova Scotia and then Surveyor-General at Halifax. In 1830 he retired on half-pay. On his return he was appointed Assistant Adjutant-General in Dublin.

He retired from the army in September 1834 and became Chief Magistrate in Gibraltar.

== Awards ==
He was rewarded for his military service with a knighthood from Queen Victoria and the Prussian Order of Military Merit, the Russian Orders of St. Anna and St. Vladimir as well as made a Knight Commander of the Royal Guelphic Order and a Groom of Her Majesty's Most Hon. Privy chamber. For his services in the Peninsular War he received the Gold Cross with four clasps.

== Family life ==
He married secondly, Eliza Mary, eldest daughter of Joseph Bettesworth of Ryde in the Isle of Wight, and widow of Hans Francis Hastings, 12th Earl of Huntingdon on 26 April 1838.

== Legacy ==
Harris' grandson published a biography of his grandfather in 1893:

- Harris, Clement B (1893). Brief Memoir of the Late Lt.-Col. Sir Thomas Noel Harris, K.H., Knight of the Royal Order of Military Merit of Prussia, and of the Imperial Orders of St. Anne and Vladimir of Russia Hazell. Watson and Viney.

These is a memorial to him in the nave of St Laurence's Church, Ramsgate, Kent, which states that he 'served and bled for his country'.
