= HMS Valorous (1816) =

History

United Kingdom
- Name: Valorous
- Ordered: 28 November 1812
- Builder: Pater Dockyard
- Laid down: March 1815
- Launched: 10 February 1816
- Completed: 26 March 1816
- Commissioned: February 1821
- Fate: Broken up by 13 August 1829

General characteristics
- Class & type: Hermes-class post ship
- Tons burthen: 513 53/94 bm
- Length: 121 ft 7 in (37.1 m) (gundeck); 100 ft 6 in (30.6 m) (keel)
- Beam: 31 ft (9.4 m)
- Depth: 8 ft 9 in (2.7 m)
- Sail plan: Full-rigged ship
- Complement: 135
- Armament: 18 × 32-pounder carronades; 2 × 9-pounder cannon

HMS Valorous was a 20-gun Hermes-class post ship sixth-rate post ship built for the Royal Navy during the 1810s. She was placed in commission in 1821 for service abroad in the Caribbean and Newfoundland. Two of her captains were forced to resign their commands during this time and the ship was placed in reserve in 1826 until she was broken up in 1829.

== Description ==
Valorous had a length at the gundeck of 121 feet 7 inches (37.1 m) and 100 feet 6 inches (30.6 m) at the keel. She had a beam of 30 feet 11 inches (9.4 m) and a depth of hold of 8 feet 9 inches (2.7 m). The ship's tonnage was 513 53/94 tons burthen. Valorous was initially armed with eighteen 32-pounder carronades on her gundeck and a pair of 9-pounder cannon as chase guns. The ship had a crew of 135 officers and ratings.

== Construction and career ==
Valorous, the second ship of her name to serve in the Royal Navy, was ordered on 28 November 1812, laid down in March 1815 in Pater Dockyard, Wales, and launched, together with her sister ship, Ariadne, on 10 February 1813. She was completed on 26 March 1816 at Plymouth Dockyard at the cost of £11,726 and placed in ordinary.

She was converted into a 26-gun post ship at Plymouth Dockyard in March 1820 – 4 July 1821. The ship's first commission began in February 1821 under the command of Captain James Murray for service on the Newfoundland Station. Murray was forced to resign his command the following year and Valorous recommissioned in August 1824 with Captain Hans Francis Hastings, 12th Earl of Huntingdon, in command for service in the Caribbean. He grew seriously ill in 1825 and was also forced to resign. The ship was placed in ordinary again at Chatham Dockyard in 1826–1829 and was broken up by 13 August 1829.
