= Hans Francis Hastings, 12th Earl of Huntingdon =

British Royal Navy officer and peer

Hans Francis Hastings, 12th Earl of Huntingdon (14 August 1779 – 9 December 1828) was a British Royal Navy officer and peer. He was sometimes known by his second Christian name, Francis, Earl of Huntingdon.

== Family background ==
Hastings was the youngest of the four sons of Lieutenant-Colonel George Hastings, a great-great-great-great-grandson of Sir Edward Hastings of Leicester Abbey, son of Francis Hastings, 2nd Earl of Huntingdon. During the lifetime of Francis Hastings, 10th Earl of Huntingdon, George's elder brother was regarded as heir-presumptive to the earldom, and a marriage was arranged between George and the Earl's younger sister Lady Selina Hastings (daughter of the 9th Earl and his wife Selina). However, Lady Selina died on 12 May 1763, and in 1769 George Hastings married instead Sarah Fowler, daughter of Sir Richard Fowler, 2nd Baronet, of Harnage Grange. The 10th Earl of Huntingdon died on 2 October 1789 and was succeeded in his estates and the baronies of Botreaux, Hungerford, de Moleyns and Hastings by his surviving sister Elizabeth, whose son Francis Rawdon-Hastings was created Marquess of Hastings in 1816. George Hastings' brother the Rev. Theophilus Henry Hastings, though assuming the style of 11th Earl of Huntingdon, took no steps to prove his right to the Earldom, which therefore became dormant.

== Early career and marriage ==
Hans Francis Hastings entered the Royal Navy in 1793 and was promoted lieutenant in 1799. He was severely wounded in an action in Quiberon Bay.

On 12 May 1803 he married Frances Cobbe, the daughter of the Rev. Richard Chaloner Cobbe, rector of Great Marlow. They had four sons:

- Francis Theophilus Henry Hastings, later 13th Earl, (31 July 1808 – 13 September 1875), married Elizabeth Anne Power, daughter of Richard Power, and had issue
- George Fowler Hastings (28 November 1814 – 21 March 1876), later a vice-admiral and CB, married Mathilde Alice Hitchcock and had issue; great-grandparents of actor Patrick Macnee.
- Edward Plantagenet Robin Hood Hastings (12 August 1818 – 17 October 1857), married Caroline Sarah Morris and had issue. He died in India on 17 October 1857, during the Indian Mutiny, at Ghazeepore, while serving as a Captain of the Bengal Army's 32nd Regiment, Native Infantry.
- Richard Godolphin Henry Hastings (26 March 1820 – 10 March 1865), later rector of Hertingfordbury, married Agnes Fynes-Clinton, daughter of Henry Fynes-Clinton, and had issue

and four daughters

- Frances Theophila Anne Hastings (28 June 1805 – 7 May 1851), married Captain Henry Parker RN and had issue
- Selina Arabella Lucy Hastings (15 May 1807 – 22 April 1885), married Rear-Admiral Charles Calmady Dent and had issue
- Arabella Georgiana Hastings (29 April 1811 – 29 January 1899), married George Augustus Frederick Brooke, son of Sir Henry Brooke, 1st Baronet, and had issue
- Louisa Hastings (January 1816 – 7 February 1868), married the Rev. John Lees, rector of Annaghdown, and had issue.

== Claim to the Earldom ==
For a distant kinsman (6th cousin) of the tenth Earl of Huntingdon, the successful pursuit of a claim to the peerage, which had fallen into abeyance, was an arduous affair which finally succeeded in 1819. A book was written on the subject.

He was descended from Edward Hastings, the fourth son of Francis Hastings, 2nd Earl of Huntingdon, as follows:

1. Sir Edward Hastings m. Barbara Devereux, granddaughter of Walter Devereux, 1st Viscount Hereford, through his son, Sir William Devereux
2. Sir Henry Hastings (d. after 18 Jun 1640) m. Mabel Faunt
3. Henry Hastings (d. abt 1654) m. 19 Jul 1641, in Long Clawson, Jane Goodall
4. Richard Hastings (bap 5 May 1645, Humberstone, bur 30 Oct 1714, Welford) m. 1 Oct 1697, in Frolesworth, Sarah Sleath (bur 7 Dec 1707, Lutterworth)
5. Henry Hastings (bap 22 May 1701, Lutterworth, bur 10 Oct 1786, Lutterworth) m. 7 Nov 1727, in Lutterworth, Elizabeth Hudson
6. Lt.-Col. George Hastings (bap 6 Jun 1735, Lutterworth, d. 6 Feb 1802) m. 2 Apr 1769, in Westminster St James, Sarah Hodges (d. 1807)
7. Hans Francis Hastings, 12th Earl of Huntingdon (b. 14 Aug 1779, d. 9 Dec 1828)

== Later life ==
On 31 March 1820, Huntingdon's wife Frances died, and on 28 September the same year, he married Eliza Mary, daughter of Joseph Bettesworth of Ryde and widow of Alexander Thistlethwayte.

He returned to his naval career, being promoted Commander on 7 March 1821. He served as Governor of Dominica between 1822 and 1824, and was made Post Captain on 29 May 1824. On 14 August the same year, he took over command of the Hermes class sixth-rate sloop HMS Valorous and sailed her to the West Indies. However, he became seriously ill, relinquished his command, and took a passage home by way of New York.

He died at Green Park, Youghal, at the age of 49, and was succeeded in the earldom by his eldest son, Francis Theophilus Henry Hastings. His widow remarried on 26 April 1838 to Colonel Sir Thomas Noel Harris KCH and died on 9 November 1846 in Boulogne, France.

Peerage of England
Vacant Dormant de jure holder Theophilus Hastings	Earl of Huntingdon; 1819–1828	Succeeded by Francis Hastings
