= John Wallington =

English cricketer

Lieutenant-Colonel John Clement Wallington
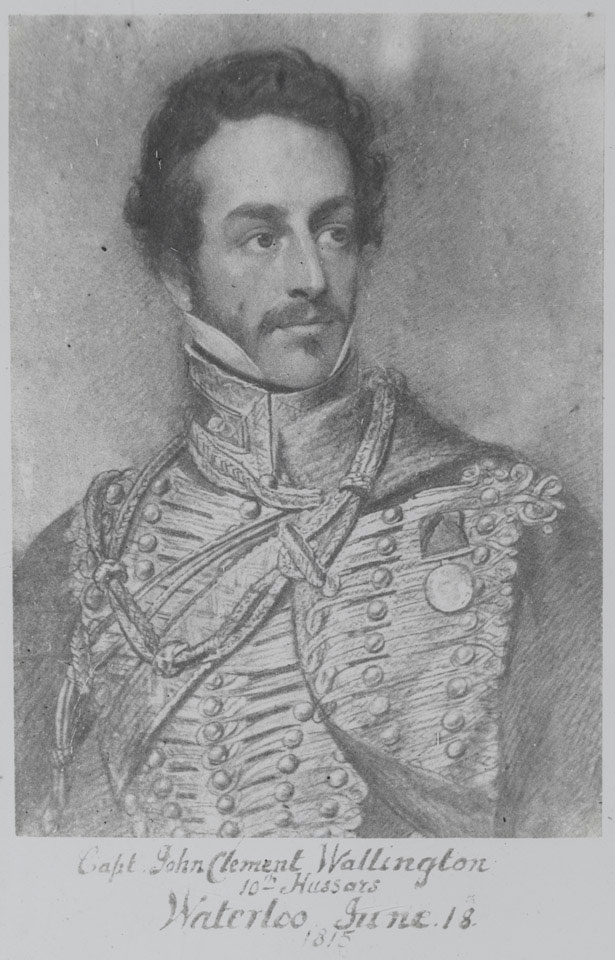
- Wallington as a captain in the 10th Hussars c. 1815
- Born: 25 July 1790; Ealing
- Died: 25 August 1872 (aged 82); Leamington Priors
- Burial place: Leamington Spa Cemetery
- Relatives: Thomas Noel Harris (cousin)
- Military career
- Allegiance: United Kingdom
- Branch: British Army
- Service years: 1813–1846
- Rank: Lieutenant-Colonel
- Commands: 10th Hussars
- Conflicts: Napoleonic Wars; Battle of Quatre Bras; Battle of Waterloo; Liberal Wars
- Awards: Waterloo Medal

Lieutenant-Colonel John Clement Wallington (25 July 1790 – 25 August 1872) was an English cricketer and soldier.

== Life ==
John Clement Wallington was born in Ealing, Middlesex, on 25 July 1790. Wallington joined the 10th Hussars, then known as the 10th (Prince of Wales's Own Royal) Regiment of Light Dragoons, on 21 October 1813, becoming a cornet. He was promoted to lieutenant on 27 December 1814, and fought at the battles of Quatre Bras and Waterloo in the Hundred Days campaign. At Waterloo his horse was killed by a cannonball which narrowly missed Wallington, going on to kill another officer nearby. The cannonball is now held by the Imperial War Museum. Also serving at Waterloo was Wallington's cousin, Major Thomas Noel Harris. Harris was badly injured and left on the battlefield, where Wallington found him the day afterward. He carried Harris to Hougoumont where the latter underwent surgery.

Wallington's regiment subsequently returned to England, where for several years it was based on the south coast fighting smuggling operations. Wallington then spent time with the regiment in Scotland before returning to their garrison at Brighton. He was promoted to captain on 16 December 1824, and as such served in Portugal during the Liberal Wars between 1826 and 1828. Wallington was subsequently promoted to major on 3 April 2833, and became commanding officer of the 10th Hussars as a lieutenant-colonel on 3 April 1846. He retired from the army soon afterwards.

Wallington died at Leamington Priors on 25 August 1872, age 82. He was buried in Leamington Spa Cemetery. His Waterloo Medal was sold at auction in 2004, raising £3,600.

== Cricket ==
Wallington played from 1817 to 1828. He was mainly associated with Hampshire and with Marylebone Cricket Club (MCC), of which he was a member. He made four known appearances in important matches.

== Bibliography ==
- Bromley, Janet; Bromley, David (2015). Wellington's Men Remembered. Vol. 2. Barnsley, South Yorkshire: The Praetorian Press. ISBN 978-1-84884-750-7.
- Haygarth, Arthur (1996) [1862]. Scores & Biographies, Volume 1 (1744–1826). Kennington: Frederick Lillywhite. ISBN 978-19-00592-23-9.
- Haygarth, Arthur (1997) [1862]. Scores & Biographies, Volume 2 (1827–1840). Kennington: Frederick Lillywhite. ISBN 978-19-00592-23-9.
