= Superior (schooner) =

History

United States
- Name: Superior
- Laid down: 1816
- Fate: Deliberately destroyed (1829)

General characteristics
- Type: Schooner
- Tonnage: 70.26 long tons (71.39 t)
- Tons burthen: 70 BOM
- Length: 62 ft (19 m)
- Beam: 18 ft 1 in (5.51 m)
- Depth: 7 ft 2 in (2.18 m)
- Decks: 1
- Propulsion: Sails

The Superior was a schooner that operated on the Great Lakes in the early 19th century.

== History ==
The wooden schooner was built in Ashtabula, Ohio, in 1816 from "the best materials". The following year it was enrolled at Presque Isle, Michigan. On April 13, 1824, it was purchased by a joint group of parties in Detroit. The following year, on May 17, it was sold to Reynold Gillet of Buffalo, New York. In 1825, an advert was placed with the Buffalo Emporium showing that the ship was to make voyage from Buffalo to Detroit on March 24, weather permitting. The advert invited interested travellers to apply to the captain "for freight or passage [with] good accommodations".

On May 9, 1825, the schooner ran aground near Cedar Point, Ohio on Lake Erie. Three years later, on January 29, 1828, it again ran aground on the lake near Buffalo.

=== Over the falls ===
In 1829, the Superior was purchased by businessmen for use in a stunt. A planned dive by Sam Patch into the base of the falls was advertised as a major public event, occurring on October 7. A side-attraction was to have the schooner sail over the falls and crash spectacularly in the lower Niagara River. However, on October 15 the Cleveland Weekly Herald reported that the Superior stunt "eventuated in a perfect failure". The story described how the ship should have "precipitated entire, into the gulf below", but that it became caught on a reef.

Over a month later, on November 23, the Fredonia Censor announced that a severe gale had dislodged the ship and that it went over the falls, having "reached the brink of the Falls without breaking".
