= HMS Ariadne (1816) =

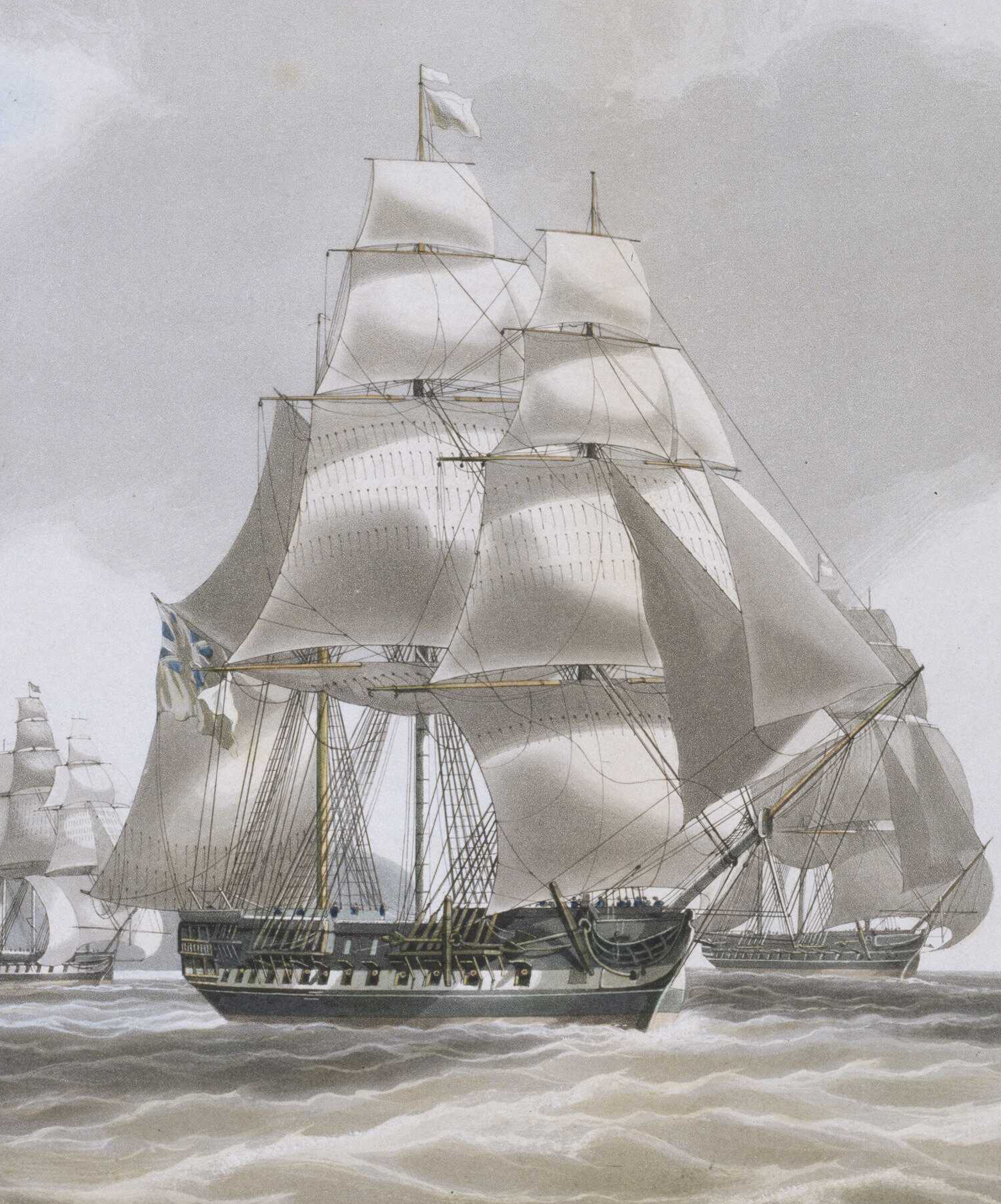
- Ariadne in July 1830

History

United Kingdom
- Name: Ariadne
- Namesake: Ariadne
- Ordered: 28 November 1812
- Builder: Pater Dockyard
- Laid down: April 1815
- Launched: 10 February 1816
- Completed: 21 March 1816
- Commissioned: April 1823
- Reclassified: As a coal hulk, 1836–1837
- Fate: Sold for scrap, 12 July 1841

General characteristics
- Class & type: Hermes-class post ship
- Tons burthen: 509 25/94 bm
- Length: 119 ft 11 in (36.6 m) (gundeck); 99 ft 10 in (30.4 m) (keel)
- Beam: 31 ft (9.4 m)
- Draught: 10 ft 3 in (3.1 m)
- Depth: 8 ft 8 in (2.6 m)
- Sail plan: Full-rigged ship
- Complement: 135
- Armament: 20 guns: Gundeck: 18 × 32-pdr carronades + 2 × 9-pdr guns; after 1820 conversion (26-guns): Gundeck: 18 × 32-pdr carronades; QD: 6 × 18-pdr carronades; Fc: 2 × 9-pdr bow chasers

HMS Ariadne was a 20-gun Hermes-class sixth-rate post ship built for the Royal Navy during the 1810s. The vessel was completed in 1816, modified in the early 1820s and only entered service in 1823. Ariadne was assigned to the Cape of Good Hope Station, followed by a stint in the Mediterranean Sea. The ship served on the North America and West Indies Station from 1829 to 1835. She was paid off in 1835, turned into a coal hulk the following year and sold for scrap in 1841.

== Description ==
Ariadne had a length at the gundeck of 121 feet 7 inches (37.1 m) and 100 feet 6 inches (30.6 m) at the keel. She had a beam of 30 feet 11 inches (9.4 m), a draught of 10 feet (3.0 m) and a depth of hold of 8 feet 9 inches (2.7 m). The ship's tonnage was 511 42/94 tons burthen. Ariadne was armed with initially eighteen, later twenty-four, 32-pounder carronades on her gundeck and a pair of 9-pounder cannon as chase guns. The ship had a crew of 135 officers and ratings.

== Construction and career ==
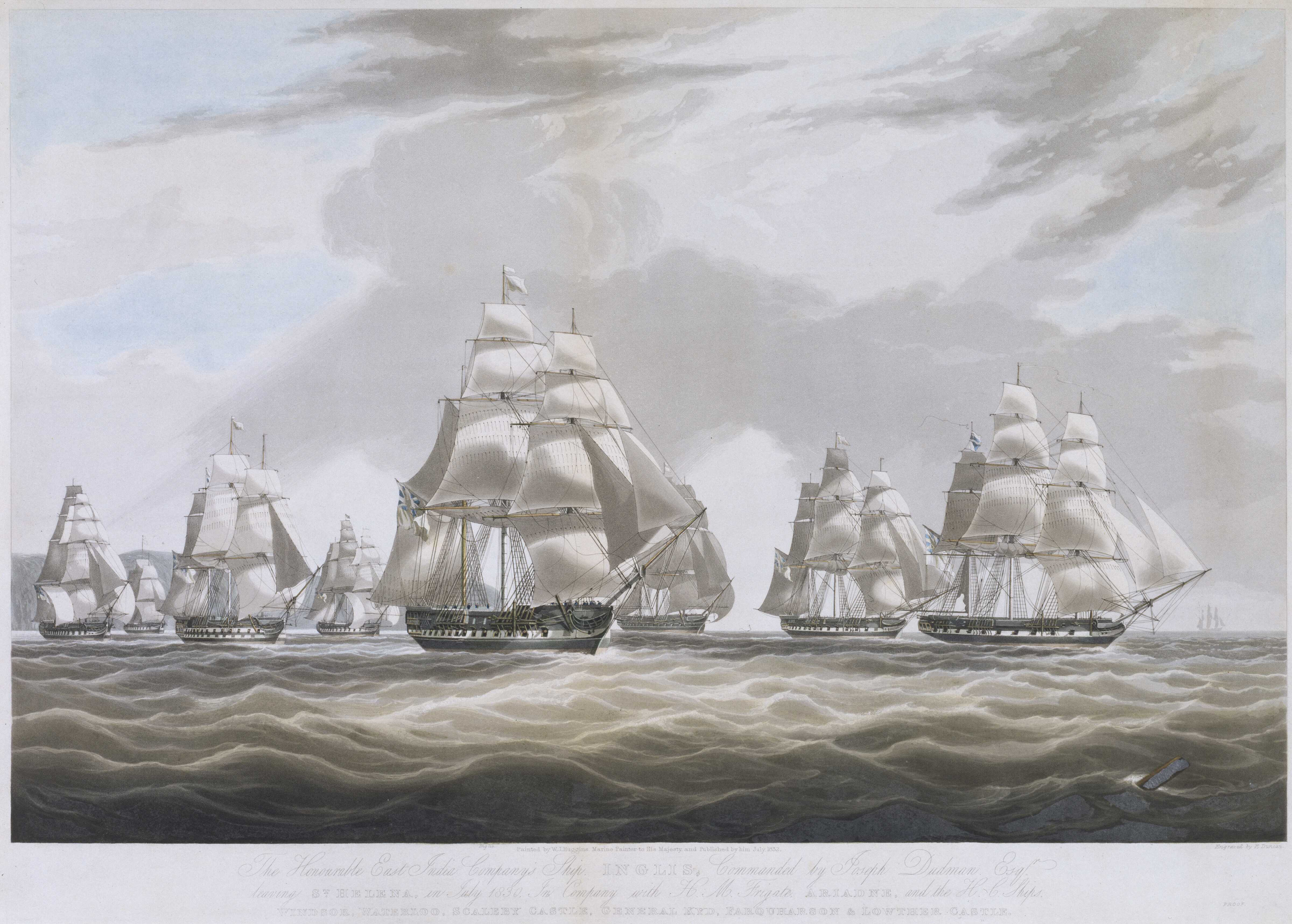
The Honourable East India Company's Ship Inglis - leaving St Helena in July 1830, in company with H.M. Frigate Ariadne and the H.C. Ships Windsor, Waterloo, Scaleby Castle, General Kidd, Farquharson & Lowther Castle. Ariadne is likely the ship on the far right (flying the White Ensign), leading the line to port.

Ariadne, the third ship of her name to serve in the Royal Navy, was ordered on 28 November 1812, laid down in April 1815 in Pater Dockyard, Wales, and launched, together with her sister ship, Valorous, on 10 February 1816 by John Campbell, Lord Cawdor. She was completed on 21 March 1816 and placed in ordinary. Ariadne cost £11,936 to build and a further £3,579 to fit out. She was converted into a 26-gun post ship at Plymouth Dockyard in January–May 1820 by the addition of quarterdeck, with further six carronades, and forecastle to the original flush-deck construction, and fitted for sea in March–August 1822.

The ship's first commission began in April 1823 under the command of Captain Robert Moorsom. He was relieved by Captain Isaac Chapman in December 1824 and Ariadne was assigned to the Cape of Good Hope Station. Chapman was court-martialed and dismissed from the service in June 1826 for having purchased a female slave and brought her aboard, but he had been relieved by Captain Lord Adolphus Fitzclarence earlier in February, by which time the ship was assigned to the Mediterranean Fleet. She was paid off at Plymouth at its end in May 1828, but began a refit in August that lasted until February 1829. Captain Frederick Marryat was appointed to her on 11 October 1828 for service in the Central Atlantic. Ariadne was paid off in November 1830, but recommissioned for service on the North America and West Indies Station that lasted until 1835. The ship was refitted as a coal hulk in November 1836–February 1837 for service at Alexandria, Egypt, and was sold for scrap there on 23 July 1841.
