= William Miles (1816 ship) =

UK merchant ship (1816–1883)

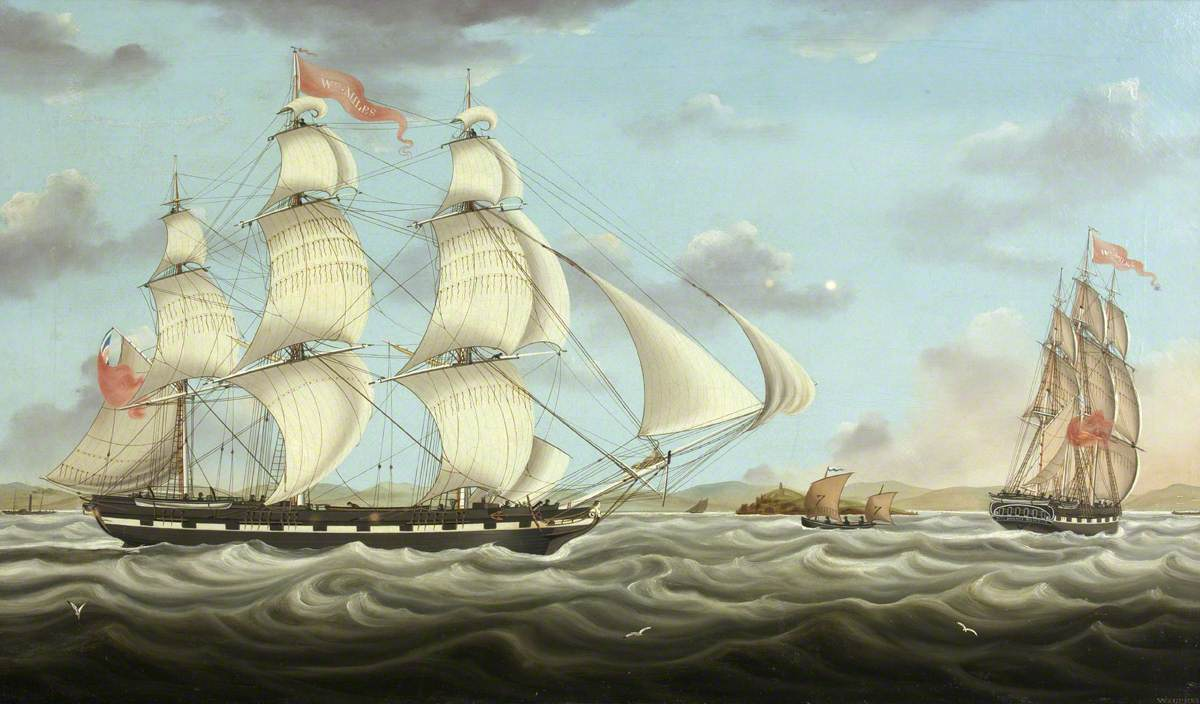
- Ship William Miles, of Bristol, in two positions. Miles Walters (1774–1849), Bristol Museum and Art Gallery

History

United Kingdom
- Name: William Miles
- Builder: George Hilhouse & Sons, Bristol
- Launched: 1816
- Fate: Wrecked 9 August 1883

General characteristics
- Tonnage: 572 GRT (post 1854)
- Tons burthen: 1816: 323 (bm); 1854: 634 (bm; new Act (post 1836), & post lengthening)
- Length: 1816: 105 ft 1 in (32.0 m); 1854: 134 ft 4 in (40.9 m)
- Beam: 1816: 26 ft 6 in (8.1 m); 1854: 28 ft 4 in (8.6 m)
- Depth of hold: 19 ft 2 in (5.8 m) (post 1854)

William Miles was launched at Bristol in 1816 as a West Indiaman. She remained a West Indiaman until 1846, though she did make some voyages to Archangel and to the Baltic. New owners from 1846 sailed her to Quebec and North America. She underwent lengthening in 1854. Thereafter, a sequence of owners sailed her to India and the Mediterranean. She was wrecked on 9 August 1883.

== Career ==
William Miles first appeared in Lloyd's Register (LR) in 1816.

| Year | Master | Owner | Trade | Source & Notes |
|---|---|---|---|---|
| 1816 | [Richard] Williams | Miles & Co. | Bristol–Jamaica | LR |
| 1822 | Williams; R[ees] Waters | Miles & Co. | Bristol–Jamaica | LR |
| 1823 | R. Waters; J[ohn] Escott | Miles & Co. | Bristol–Jamaica | LR |
| 1830 | Escott [Isaac] Reynolds | Miles & Co. | Bristol–Jamaica | LR |
| 1838 | [James] Pike | Miles & Co. | Bristol–Jamaica | LR: large repairs 1833 & 1835 |
| 1843 | [James] Cook[e] | Miles & Co. | Bristol–Trinidad; Bristol–Jamaica | LR; large repairs 1833 & 1835, & some repairs 1842 & 1843 |
| 1845 | Crow; Rowe | Miles & Co. Howell & Son | Bristol–Jamaica; Bristol–Quebec | LR; large repairs 1833 & 1835, & some repairs 1842 & 1843 |
| 1846 | [Thomas] Rowe | Howell & Son | Bristol–Quebec; Bristol–America | LR; large repairs 1833 & 1835, & some repairs 1842 & 1843 |
| 1850 | [James] Ayre | Howell & Co. | | LR |

Between 1851 and 1853, William Miles was not listed. In 1854 she reappeared, having undergone lengthening that under the pre-1836 method of calculation doubled her burthen.

| Year | Master | Owner | Trade | Source |
|---|---|---|---|---|
| 1854 | T.Creighton | J.DeWolf | Liverpool–Calcutta | LR; lengthened 1854 |
| 1860 | Silver | M.I.Wilson | London–India | LR; lengthened 1854 |

William Miles received sheathing with yellow metal.

| Year | Master | Owner | Trade | Source |
|---|---|---|---|---|
| 1864 | | W.N.de Mattos | Liverpool | LR; lengthened 1854 |
| 1865 | H.Hills | G.& J.Robinson | Liverpool; London–Mediterranean | LR; lengthened 1854 |
| 1869 | H.Hills | G.& J.Robinson | London–Mediterranean | LR; lengthened 1854 |
| 1883–1884 | R.Williams | G.&J.Robinson | London | LR; lengthened 1854 |

== Fate ==
William Miles stranded near Porthcawl in the Bristol Channel on 9 Aug 1883. The Royal National Lifeboat Institution lifeboat Chafyn Grove rescued all twelve people on board. William Miles was on a voyage from Le Havre to Swansea. The lifeboat first took off the mate's wife and a seaman; the rest of the crew refused to leave. When the winds increased the lifeboat came back and took off the remaining crew.

Her entry in Lloyd's Register for 1883 carried the annotation "Lost".
