= Hermes-class post ship =

Class overview
- Name: Hermes-class 20-gun ships
- Operators: Royal Navy
- Preceded by: Laurel class
- Succeeded by: Cyrus class
- Completed: 4
- Lost: 1
- Scrapped: 3

General characteristics
- Type: Post ship
- Tons burthen: 507 76/94 (as designed)
- Length: 119 ft (36.3 m) (gundeck); 99 ft 10.625 in (30.4 m) (keel)
- Beam: 30 ft 11 in (9.4 m)
- Depth: 8 ft 7 in (2.62 m)
- Sail plan: Full-rigged ship
- Complement: 135
- Armament: Hermes & Myrmidon (20-guns); Upperdeck: 18 × 32-pounder carronades + 2 × 9-pounder guns; Ariadne & Valorous (26-guns); Upperdeck: 18 × 32-pounder carronades; QD: 6 × 18-pounder carronades; Fc: 2 × 9-pounder bow chasers

The Hermes class were a series of four 20-gun ships, launched between 1811 and 1816. Two pairs of ships were produced, to slightly different designs – the first two had 20 guns and were unrated flush-decked ship-sloops, whilst the latter two were converted to 26-gun sixth-rates. The design was based on the ex-French 20-gun corvette Bonne Citoyenne, which the British had captured in 1796.

The first pair was built at Milford Dockyard on the north side of Milford Haven. Hermes was launched in 1811 and Myrmidon in 1813. Milford Dockyard was closed following their construction, and the second pair were built at the new Pater (later Pembroke Dock) Dockyard on the south side of Milford Haven.

The second pair – Valorous and Ariadne – were launched on the same date in 1816. They were modified at Plymouth Dockyard in 1820 and 1821 respectively, before their first commission, by the addition of quarterdecks and forecastle to what had originally been flush-deck vessels, and they were at that time re-classed as 26-gun sixth rate post ships.

The Cyrus class was based on the design of the Myrmidon of the Hermes class.

== Ships in class ==
- HMS Hermes
  - Builder: Milford Dockyard
  - Ordered: 18 January 1810
  - Laid down: May 1810
  - Launched: 22 July 1811
  - Completed: 7 September 1811
  - Fate: Grounded and burnt in action at Mobile in 1814.
- HMS Myrmidon
  - Builder: Milford Dockyard
  - Ordered: 2 August 1811
  - Laid down: July 1812
  - Launched: 18 June 1813
  - Completed: 6 February 1814 at Plymouth Dockyard
  - Fate: Broken up at Portsmouth in 1823.
- HMS Ariadne
  - Builder: Pater Dockyard
  - Ordered: 28 November 1812
  - Laid down: April 1815
  - Launched: 10 February 1816
  - Completed: 21 March 1816
  - Fate: Sold to break up at Alexandria in 1841.
- HMS Valorous
  - Builder: Pater Dockyard
  - Ordered: 28 November 1812
  - Laid down: March 1815
  - Launched: 10 February 1816
  - Completed: 26 March 1816 at Plymouth Dockyard
  - Fate: Broken up at Chatham in 1829.
