= Post ship =

Royal Navy designation for certain ships, used in the 18th and 19th centuries

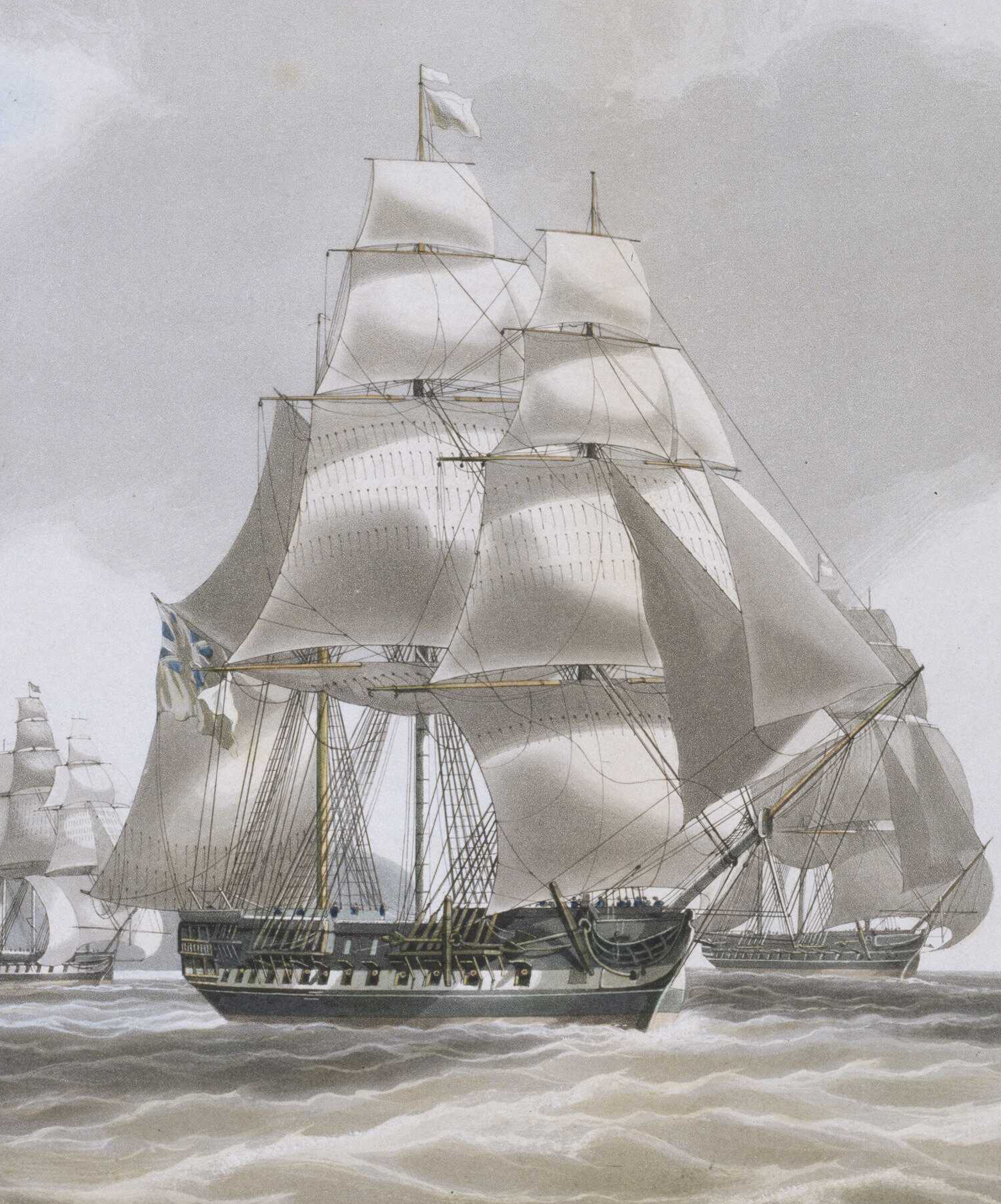
HMS Ariadne, A Hermes-class post ship

Post ship was a designation used in the Royal Navy during the second half of the 18th century and the Napoleonic Wars to describe a sixth-rate ship (see rating system of the Royal Navy) that was smaller than a frigate (in practice, carrying fewer than 28 guns), but by virtue of being a rated ship (with at least 20 guns), had to have as its captain a post-captain rather than a lieutenant or commander. Thus ships with 20 to 26 guns were post ships, though this situation changed after 1817. (See “1817 changes” in rating system of the Royal Navy.)

Sea officers often referred to the post ships as frigates though technically the Admiralty scrupulously never described them as such. The vessels were frigate-built, with traditional quarterdecks and forecastles (the defining characteristic of post ships, distinguishing them from 20-gun ship-sloops), but, unlike true frigates, they lacked an orlop platform amidships. They had a high centre of gravity, which made them slow and unweatherly, but they were seaworthy. In peacetime the Royal Navy frequently used them as substitutes for frigates, especially in distant foreign stations. In wartime their slowness meant they were used mostly as convoy escorts.

Unlike other uses of the term "ship" during this era, "post ship" in itself implies nothing as regards the rig of the vessel; however, all sixth rates were in practice ship-rigged, i.e. were square-rigged on three masts.

For an example of a post ship, see HMS Camilla. She was one of ten Sphinx-class post ships built during the 1770s.

The United States Navy termed ships of this type "third-class frigates."

== Sources ==
- Lyon, David (1993). The Sailing Navy List - all the Ships of the Royal Navy 1688-1860. Conway Maritime Press.
- Rodger, N. A. M. (2004). The Command of the Ocean, a Naval History of Britain 1649–1815. Allen Lane. ISBN 0-7139-9411-8.
- Winfield, Rif (2009). British Warships in the Age of Sail 1603–1714: Design, Construction, Careers and Fates. Seaforth Publishing. ISBN 978-1-84832-040-6.
- Winfield, Rif (2007). British Warships in the Age of Sail 1714–1792: Design, Construction, Careers and Fates. Seaforth Publishing. ISBN 978-1-84415-700-6.
- Winfield, Rif (2008) [2005]. British Warships in the Age of Sail 1793–1817: Design, Construction, Careers and Fates (2nd, revised ed.). Seaforth. ISBN 978-1-84415-717-4.
- Winfield, Rif (2014). British Warships in the Age of Sail 1817–1863: Design, Construction, Careers and Fates. Seaforth Publishing. ISBN 978-1-84832-169-4.
